= M32 (Johannesburg) =

Metropolitan route in Greater Johannesburg, South Africa

Metropolitan route M32

Route information
- Maintained by Johannesburg Roads Agency and Gauteng Department of Roads and Transport
- Length: 21 km (13 mi)

Major junctions
- West end: M39 at Cresslawn

- M92 at Spartan M84 at Kempton Park CBD M57 at Kempton Park CBD M96 at Kempton Park CBD M45 / M43 at Kempton Park AH; R21 at Pomona AH; R23 at Bredell

- East end: M44 at Petit

Location
- Country: South Africa

Highway system
- Numbered routes of South Africa
← M31	→ M33

The M32 is a short metropolitan route in Greater Johannesburg, South Africa. The entire route is in the City of Ekurhuleni Metropolitan Municipality. It goes from the western part of Kempton Park eastwards to the northern parts of Benoni.

== Route ==
The M32 begins at a junction with the M39 road (Isando Road) in the western part of Kempton Park, just east of the Spartan Extensions and just south of Esther Park. It begins by going east as Plane Road, forming the northern border of Cresslawn, Spartan and Rhodesfield Extension 1, to enter the Kempton Park CBD and reach a junction with the M57 road (Pretoria Road). The M32 joins the M57 and they are one road southwards for 400 metres up to the next junction, where the M32 becomes Petrus “Chilly” Magagula Road (formerly Albatross Street) towards the north-east and forms the northern border of the Rhodesfield suburb, separating it from the Kempton Park CBD. From the M57 junction north-eastwards, the M32 is parallel to the R21 freeway.

Shortly after splitting from the M57, the M32 flies over the M96 road (Voortrekker Street) to exit the Kempton Park CBD and bypass Kempton Park Extension 1. At Kempton Park AH, the M32 forms an interchange with the M45/M43 (Dann Road) before crossing the R21 freeway (no-longer parallel) to enter the suburb of Pomona.

Soon after the R21 interchange, the M32 forms a junction with the R23 road, turns to the east-south-east and passes through Bredell, the last suburb of Kempton Park, as 3rd Avenue before passing through the far northern parts of Benoni (passing through Benoni Farms) as Elm Road and Birch Road before reaching Petit, where it ends at a junction with the M44 road (Pretoria Road), just 1.5 kilometres south-east of the M44's junction with the R51.
