= M39 (Johannesburg) =

Metropolitan route in Greater Johannesburg, South Africa

Metropolitan route M39

Route information
- Maintained by Johannesburg Roads Agency and Gauteng Department of Roads and Transport
- Length: 39.6 km (24.6 mi)

Major junctions
- North end: R55 at Kyalami Gardens, Midrand
- N1 in Midrand; R101 in Midrand; M18 near Thembisa; R25 in Kempton Park West; M90 in Kempton Park West M88 in Esther Park M32 in Cresslawn M92 in Croydon; M16 in Croydon M99 in Isando M59 in Isando M44 in Elandsfontein M52 in Homestead M57 in Woodmere; R29 in Germiston Knights M46 near Germiston South M53 in Elsburg

- South end: M94 at Wadeville

Location
- Country: South Africa

Highway system
- Numbered routes of South Africa
← M38	→ M40

The M39 is a long metropolitan route in Greater Johannesburg, South Africa. It connects Kyalami with Germiston via Midrand, Kempton Park & Isando.

== Route ==
The M39 begins at a junction with the R55 road in Kyalami Gardens, at the entrance to the Kyalami Grand Prix Circuit. It goes east-south-east into the southern suburbs of Midrand as Allandale Road, bypassing Vorna Valley, to bypass the Mall of Africa and form an interchange with the N1 highway (Ben Schoeman Freeway) before meeting the R101 road (Old Pretoria Main Road).

The M39 continues south-east as Allandale Road, then as Chloorkop Road, bypassing the Austin View suburb of Midrand, to meet the southern terminus of the M18 road (Andrew Mapheto Drive) at a T-junction just south-west of the Thembisa Township. At this junction, the M39 turns southwards to be named Zuurfontein Avenue.

The M39 continues southwards as a dual carriageway, bypassing Chloorkop, to enter the western part of the city of Kempton Park, where it passes through Kempton Park West before forming an interchange with the R25 road (Modderfontein Road) and passing through Esther Park, where the street name changes to Isando Road.

As Isando Road, the M39 meets the western terminus of the M32 road just after Esther Park and bypasses the Cresslawn suburb before bypassing the Croydon suburb, where it meets the M16 road (Andre Greyvenstein Road; Barbazon Road) before flying over the R24 highway (Albertina Sisulu Freeway), meeting the M99 road (Electron Avenue; Herman Street) and entering the Isando Industrial Area. At the M16 junction, it ceases to be a dual carriageway.

Soon After, it meets the southern terminus of the M59 road and changes its street name to Lazarus Mawela Road (formerly Barbara Road). It enters the city of Germiston and continues southwards to bypass the Elandsfontein Industrial Area and meet the western terminus of the M44 road (North Reef Road) before flying over the N12 highway. Just after flying over the N12, the M39 meets the eastern terminus of the M52 road (North Reef Road) before meeting the M57 road (Ntemi Ncwane Road; which connects to the Germiston City Centre) and passing through the Woodmere suburb to reach a junction with the R29 road (Main Reef Road). The M39 joins the R29 westwards up to the 4th junction, where the M39 becomes Stanley Road southwards. After a few metres, it becomes Knights Road and turns to the south-east to reach a junction with the M46 road (Lower Boksburg Road), where it joins the M46 eastwards up to the next junction, where it becomes Simon Bekker Road southwards.

The M39 continues southwards into the Elsburg suburb, where it meets the M53 road (Elsburg Road) at a roundabout. The M53 joins the M39 and they are one road southwards up to the Voortrekker Street junction, where the M39 becomes Voortrekker Street south-eastwards. At the junction by Hoërskool Elsburg, the M39 becomes Brug street westwards up to the next junction, where it becomes Guthrie Road southwards and flies over the N17 highway. It ends shortly after at a junction with the M94 road (Dekema Road) in the suburb of Wadeville.
