= M45 (Johannesburg) =

Metropolitan route in Greater Johannesburg, South Africa

Metropolitan route M45

Route information
- Maintained by Johannesburg Roads Agency and Gauteng Department of Roads and Transport
- Length: 45.6 km (28.3 mi)

Major junctions
- North-west end: M57 at Kempton Park

- M91 in Kempton Park M43 in Kempton Park M32 in Kempton Park M43 in Kempton Park; R23 in Benoni M44 in Benoni; N12 in Benoni; R29 in Benoni M56 in Brakpan M46 in Brakpan; R554 in Brakpan; N17 in Brakpan M63 in Dunnottar
- South-east end: R51 near Dunnottar

Location
- Country: South Africa

Highway system
- Numbered routes of South Africa
← M44	→ M46

The M45 is a long metropolitan route in Greater Johannesburg, South Africa. It connects Kempton Park with Dunnottar (north of Nigel) via Benoni, Brakpan, KwaThema and Tsakane. The entire route is in the City of Ekurhuleni Metropolitan Municipality.

== Route ==
The M45 begins in Kempton Park, at a t-junction with the M57 road (Pretoria Road) in the suburb of Allen Grove (2 kilometres north of the Kempton Park CBD). It begins by going eastwards as Van Riebeeck Road (separating Allen Grove from Kempton Park Extension 4) to reach a junction with the M91 road (Monument Road). It continues eastwards, separating Aston Manor and Nimrod Park from Kempton Park Extension 4, to reach a junction with the M43 road (Dann Road).

The M45 joins the M43 and they are one road south-east, immediately forming an interchange with the M32 road (Pomona Road) and flying over the R21 highway, to reach a junction, where the M43 becomes its own road southwards (Atlas Road) while the M45 continues south-east as Great North Road to leave Kempton Park and enter the city of Benoni. The first suburb it passes through is Brentwood Park, where it forms a junction with the R23 road.

The R23 joins the M45 and they are one road southwards up to the next junction, where the M45 becomes its own road eastwards to enter the Rynfield suburb of Benoni. The M45 turns southwards, separating the Northmead and Rynfield suburbs, to reach a junction with the M44 road (Pretoria Road). The M45 joins the M44 and they are one road southwards up to the next junction, where the M44 becomes Fifth Avenue westwards while the M45 continues south.

Just after splitting with the M44, the M45 crosses the N12 highway (Johannesburg-eMalahleni highway) as Snake Road and enters the suburb of Kleinfontein (just east of the Benoni CBD), where it reaches a junction with the R29 road (Main Reef Road). The M45 joins the R29 and they are one road south-east, bypassing the Mackenzie Park suburb, to reach a junction, where the R29 becomes its own road eastwards while the M45 continues southwards to leave Benoni and enter the town of Brakpan.

It becomes Prince George Avenue in Brakpan, bypassing the Bosman Stadium before reaching a junction with the M46 road (Voortrekker Road) in the town centre. The M45 joins the M46 and they are one road westwards up to the junction adjacent to Brakpan Railway Station, where the M45 becomes Goods Street southwards. It continues up to the junction with the R554 road (Springs Road). The M45 joins the R554 and they are one road eastwards up to the junction with Ergo Road, where the M45 splits from the R554 to become Ergo Road southwards.

The M45 meets the N17 highway (westbound only) and leaves Brakpan to enter the town of KwaThema. It enters KwaThema in a south-easterly direction and turns south in the Vulcania South suburb to become 12th Road. Just after the White City suburb, the M45 becomes Vlakfontein Road to the south-east, bypassing the Langaville suburb to the north. It then turns southwards, still named Vlakfontein Road, to bypass the township of Tsakane to the east. It turns eastwards to leave Tsakane and cross Tonk Meter Road to enter Dunnottar, where it meets the M63 road (Nigel Road). It continues eastwards to reach its end at a junction with the R51 road (Nigel-Springs Road).
