= R25 (South Africa) =

Road in South Africa

Provincial route R25

Route information
- Maintained by GDRT, MDPWRT and RAL
- Length: 194 km (121 mi)

Major junctions
- Southwest end: M27 Jan Smuts Avenue, Saxonwold, Johannesburg
- N3 near Greenstone Hill; R23 near Kempton Park; R21 near Thembisa; R50 / R51 in Bapsfontein; R42 near Bronkhorstspruit; N4 in Bronkhorstspruit
- Northeast end: N11 / R33 in Groblersdal

Location
- Country: South Africa
- Major cities: Johannesburg; Kempton Park; Bapsfontein; Bronkhorstspruit; Groblersdal

Highway system
- Numbered routes of South Africa
← R24	→ R26

The R25 is a provincial route in South Africa that connects Johannesburg with Groblersdal via Kempton Park, Bapsfontein and Bronkhorstspruit.

== Route ==
Detailed Route

The R25 begins in the suburb of Saxonwold, just north of the Johannesburg Zoo, at an intersection with Jan Smuts Avenue, Johannesburg's M27 road. It heads eastwards, meeting Johannesburg's M9 road (Oxford Road) and meeting Johannesburg's M1 freeway (De Villiers Graaff Motorway; southbound access only), up to the junction with Louis Botha Avenue, Johannesburg's M11 road, where it joins the road northwards up to the next junction, where it continues by a right turn as Hathorn Avenue. It then becomes George Avenue and makes its way north-east through the suburbs of Sydenham, Fairmount and Sandringham, becoming Modderfontein Road and crossing the Jukskei River, bypassing Edenvale Hospital, before crossing the N3 highway (Johannesburg Eastern Bypass) as a dual carriageway and passing by Greenstone Hill, where Greenstone Shopping Mall is located.

It continues north-east as Modderfontein Road, with Greenstone Shopping Mall on the southern side and Longmeadow Business Estate on the northern side. After meeting the M37 municipal route from Edenvale and the M54 municipal route from Alexandra in Greenstone, the R25 bypasses Modderfontein to the south and crosses the border between the City of Johannesburg Metropolitan Municipality and the City of Ekurhuleni Metropolitan Municipality. It then goes through the western and northern suburbs of the city of Kempton Park.

In Kempton Park, it first passes by the area separating Kempton Park West from Esther Park, where it crosses the M39 municipal route (Zuurfontein Avenue), the road between Isando in the south and Midrand/Thembisa in the north. It then becomes the road separating Edleen and Van Riebeeck Park from Terenure. It then becomes the road separating Birchleigh from Norkem Park and Birchleigh North. It proceeds to reach a t-junction with the M57 municipal route, just north of the M57's junction with the R23 route from Benoni.

The R25 joins the M57 northwards for 800 metres, bordering Esselen Park, up to the next junction (a 4-way junction) near Thembisa, where the R25 becomes the road to the right (east). Right after, it crosses the R21 highway between Pretoria and Johannesburg International Airport and makes a direct line for Bapsfontein. The distance is 20 km between Kempton Park and Bapsfontein.

At Bapsfontein, the R25 meets the R50 from Pretoria and joins it going south-east for 1.6 km up until the junction with the R51 from Daveyton (the main four-way junction of Bapsfontein). At that junction, as the R51 is the road south-west to Daveyton, the R25 becomes the same road heading north-east from that junction towards Bronkhorstspruit while the R50 continues south-east to Delmas. While pointing towards Bronkhorstspruit, the R25 meets the eastern termini of the M30 and M6 municipal routes, which are coming from Garsfontein and Lynnwood in Pretoria East respectively, as well as the southern termini of the R515 and the R568.

The R25 meets the north-eastern terminus of the R42 just north of the Bronkhorstspruit Dam right before turning north and entering Bronkhorstspruit in the City of Tshwane Metropolitan Municipality. It intersects with the N4 highway (Maputo Corridor) and the R104 road (both coming from Pretoria in the west) and goes northwards through Bronkhorstspruit. The distance is 40 km between Bapsfontein and Bronkhorstspruit.

Afterwards, the R25 temporarily goes into Mpumalanga, where it bypasses Wolvenkop and intersects with the R544 from Witbank in the town of Verena, before proceeding into Limpopo province, where it passes through Dennilton before ending in the vicinity of the small farming town of Groblersdal, terminating at a junction with the N11 and the R33. The distance is 110 km between Bronkhorstspruit and Groblersdal.
