= R23 (South Africa) =

Road in South Africa

Provincial route R23

Route information
- Maintained by GDRT and SANRAL
- Length: 243 km (151 mi)

Major junctions
- North end: R25 near Kempton Park
- R21 near Kempton Park; N12 in Benoni; R29 in Benoni; N17 near Brakpan; N3 north of Heidelberg; R42 in Heidelberg; N3 south of Heidelberg; R51 in Balfour; R39 / R50 in Standerton
- South end: N11 in Volksrust

Location
- Country: South Africa
- Major cities: Kempton Park; Benoni; Brakpan; Heidelberg; Balfour; Standerton; Volksrust

Highway system
- Numbered routes of South Africa
← R22	→ R24

The R23 is a provincial route in South Africa that links Benoni with Volksrust via Brakpan, Heidelberg and Standerton.

== Route ==
Detailed Route

=== Gauteng ===
The R23 begins at the suburb of Birchleigh in the city of Kempton Park, Ekurhuleni, Gauteng at an intersection with the M57 metropolitan route (just south of the M57 route's intersection with the R25). It heads south-east, bypassing the Glen Marais suburb, before crossing the R21 freeway (Albertina Sisulu Freeway) as High Road. It then crosses the M32 metropolitan route and becomes the road separating the Pomona and Bredell suburbs, before leaving Kempton Park and entering Benoni. The first suburb it passes through is Brentwood Park, where it joins the M45 metropolitan route by way of a left turn onto Great North Road. At the next junction, the M45 becomes the road to the left (east) towards the Rynfield suburb, leaving the R23 as Great North Road south into Benoni central.

It crosses the N12 highway southwards as Tom Jones Street (and as Bunyan Street northwards; one-way streets) and enters Benoni central, bypassing Lakeside Mall. It intersects with the R29 in Benoni central and joins Range View Road southwards by way of a right turn at Mackenzie Park. Soon after, it becomes Heidelberg Road, bypassing Brakpan (co-signed with the M56 metropolitan route for a few metres), and crosses the N17 toll highway at Dalpark, next to where Carnival City is located. By Carnival City, it intersects with Elsburg Road (R554) from Brakpan and proceeds south, bypassing Tsakane, intersecting with the R550 and R103 roads, to cross the N3 toll freeway and enter Heidelberg (the distance from Benoni to Heidelberg is 45 km).

At Heidelberg, it becomes Heidelberg-Balfour Road and bypasses Heidelberg Central to the west, being like a highway passing under some roads. It intersects with the R42 (Nigel-Vereeniging road) at an off-ramp west of the Heidelberg town centre before crossing the Blesbokspruit and meeting the northern terminus of the R549 from Deneysville (Vaal Dam) at a t-junction south of the Heidelberg town centre. South of Heidelberg, it crosses back to the east of the N3 toll freeway and heads east-south-east for 35 km, crossing the Suikerbosrand River, towards Balfour in Mpumalanga.

=== Mpumalanga ===
Bypassing Balfour to the south, it intersects with the R51 road at a roundabout and continues south-east for another 75 km, through Greylingstad, to Standerton on the banks of the Vaal River, where it meets the south-eastern terminus of the R50 from Pretoria/Delmas and the south-western terminus of the R39 from Ermelo. At the same junction, it intersects with the R546 from Kinross/Evander. It is cosigned with the R546 for a few kilometres south-east, beginning southwards as Walter Sisulu Drive, then south-east as Nelson Mandela Drive, before they split. Just after crossing the Vaal River, in the suburb of Meyerville, the R546 becomes its own road southwards at the George Street junction while the R23 resumes south-east.

From Standerton, the R23 heads south-east for 85 km to reach its south-eastern terminus in the town of Volksrust, where it ends at a junction with the R543 and the N11.

== History ==
The R23 route from Heidelberg, Gauteng up to its junction with the N11 national route in Volksrust used to be part of the N3 national route, as part of the old National Route system (before 1970).
