= M57 (Johannesburg) =

Road in Gauteng Province, South Africa

Metropolitan route M57

Route information
- Maintained by Johannesburg Roads Agency and Department of Roads and Transport (Gauteng)
- Length: 42.2 km (26.2 mi)

Major junctions
- South end: R29 / M37 Shamrock Road, Primrose, Germiston

- M39 Lazarus Mawela Road, Woodmere, Germiston; N12, Elandsfontein, Germiston M44 Jet Park Road/North Reef Road, Elandsfontein, Germiston; M41 Griffiths Road, Jet Park, Boksburg M99 Electron Avenue, O.R. Tambo, Kempton Park; M16 Andre Greyvenstein Road, Rhodesfield, Kempton Park M32 Petrus "Chilly" Magagula Road, Kempton Park M32 Plane Road, Kempton Park M96 Long Street, Kempton Park; M90 C.R.Swart Drive, Kempton Park M45 Van Riebeeck Road, Kempton Park M89 Elgin Road, Birchleigh, Kempton Park M43 Vlei Street, Glen Marais, Kempton Park; R23 High Road, Esselen Park, Kempton Park; R25 Modderfontein Road, Esselen Park, Kempton Park; R562 Winnie Madikizela-Mandela Road, Tembisa; M31 Nellmapius Drive, Irene
- North end: M10 Solomon Mahlangu Drive, Waterkloof, Pretoria

Location
- Country: South Africa
- Major cities: Germiston, Kempton Park, Thembisa, Olifantsfontein, Pretoria

Highway system
- Numbered routes of South Africa
← M56	→ M59

The M57 is a major metropolitan route in Greater Johannesburg, South Africa. A north–south route, it connects Germiston with the south-eastern suburbs of Pretoria via Kempton Park and Olifantsfontein. For most of its length, it is an alternative route to the R21 freeway.

== Route ==
The M57 begins at a 4-way-junction with the R29 and M37 in Primrose (north of Germiston City Centre). It starts by heading east-north-east as Pretoria Road and meets the M39 (Lazarus Mawela Road) before crossing the N12 highway (Johannesburg-Witbank Highway) as Ntemi Ncwane Road (formerly Kraft Road). Just after the N12 junction, it reaches a junction with the M44 (North Reef Road) in the industrialised suburb of Elandsfontein. It joins the M44 road eastwards up to the next junction, where it becomes its own road northwards.

It heads northwards as Jet Park Road through Jet Park to meet the M41 (Griffiths Road) at a t-junction, with the M41 leading to the R21 freeway and to the South African Airways headquarters in the east.

From the M41 junction, it is parallel to the R21 freeway northwards, and it has the industrialised suburb of Isando to its left and the outskirts of O.R. Tambo International Airport to its right. It meets the M99 (Electron Avenue), which provides an entrance into the airport. It then, as a flyover, crosses the R24 freeway as Pretoria Road and immediately after, it meets the eastern terminus of the M16 (Andre Greyvenstein Road) as it enters the suburb of Rhodesfield in Kempton Park. Now, as Pretoria Road, it is the main road through Kempton Park's CBD and is intersected from the east by the M32 at Petrus “Chilly” Magagula Road (formerly Pomona Road) and the two are co-signed for 400 metres before the M32 becomes Plane Road westwards while the M57 continues northwards through the CBD of Kempton Park.

Crossing the M90 (C.R. Swart Drive) at Kempton Park Civic Center, it leaves the Kempton Park CBD and enters the city's northern suburbs, with Edleen to its left and Kempton Park extension 2, 3 and 4 to its right. After the M45 (Van Riebeeck Road) t-junction, it has Allen Grove to its right and Van Riebeeck Park to its left. After the Beukes Road t-junction, it has Glen Marais to its right and Birchleigh to its left. Just after, it meets the northern terminus of the M43 (Vlei Street) at a t-junction.

North-east of Birchleigh on the outskirts of Kempton Park, the M57 route meets the northern terminus of the R23 (High Road) from the east and then, at the next junction, meets the R25 (Modderfontein Road) from the west.

The R25 and M57 are co-signed northwards for 800 metres, with Esselen Park and the Witfontein extension to its left, before the R25 breaks-off and becomes the road eastwards towards Bapsfontein at a 4-way-junction, with the road westwards providing access to Thembisa South.

Continuing northwards, the M57 trails the Thembisa township to its west and the parallel R21 freeway to its east before intersecting the east/west R562 (Winnie Madikizela-Mandela Road) as Goedehoop Avenue just south-east of Clayville (also known as Olifantsfontein), where Winnie Madikizela-Mandela Road provides access to the Clayville CBD. The M57 continues northwards, passing through Clayville East and through rural agricultural suburbs before leaving Ekurhuleni and crossing the municipal border into Tshwane and reaching the outskirts of Irene, crossing to the other side of the R21 freeway as a flyover.

Crossing the M31 Nellmapius Drive, it enters Rietvallei Park and afterwards, it enters Elardus Park, becomes Boeing Street and the M57 ends shortly thereafter at a t-junction with the M10 Solomon Mahlangu Drive at Waterkloof in Pretoria.
