= M56 (Johannesburg) =

Metropolitan route in Greater Johannesburg, South Africa

Metropolitan route M56

Route information
- Maintained by Johannesburg Roads Agency and Gauteng Department of Roads and Transport
- Length: 25.8 km (16.0 mi)

Major junctions
- West end: M46 in Boksburg CBD

- M43 near Boksburg East Industrial; R23 near Benoni South M45 / M46 in Brakpan CBD; R29 / R51 in Rowhill, Springs
- East end: R555 in Everest, Springs

Location
- Country: South Africa

Highway system
- Numbered routes of South Africa
← M54	→ M57

The M56 is a short metropolitan route in Greater Johannesburg, South Africa. It connects Boksburg with the northern part of Springs via Brakpan.

== Route ==
The M56 begins at a junction with the M46 route (Leeuwpoort Street; Jubilee Road) in the Boksburg CBD, heading eastwards as Leeuwpoort Street. It turns towards the north-east and becomes Commissioner Street. It then reaches a junction with the M43 route (Van Dyk Road; Atlas Road) to leave Boksburg and immediately after, it turns right to become Lincoln Road to enter the Benoni South Industrial Area.

The M56 (Lincoln Road) reaches a t-junction with the Industry Road and becomes Industry Road southwards. At the next roundabout, the M56 becomes Lancaster Road eastwards and reaches a junction with the R23 route (Range View Road). Here, the M56 joins the R23 and they are one road southwards for 1.8 kilometres before the M56 becomes New Kleinfontein Road eastwards and enters the town of Brakpan adjacent to the Leachville suburb.

The M56 goes eastwards for 4.5 kilometres to reach a junction with the M45 route (Prince George Avenue) in the Brakpan CBD, adjacent to the Brakpan Indoor Sports Centre. It becomes Prince George Avenue southwards up to the junction with Voortrekker Street, where it meets the M46 route. Here, the M45 becomes Voortrekker Road westwards and the M56 becomes Voortrekker Road eastwards. It heads eastwards to reach a junction with Hospital Road adjacent to the Sherwood Retail Centre. Here, it becomes Hospital Road south-eastwards.

Just after the Far East Rand Hospital, the M56 turns to the north-east (still named Hospital Road) and then reaches a junction with the R29 and R51 (Kingsway Road) to enter the northern suburbs of Springs. The M56 continues eastwards as Cowles Street through the Rowhil suburb before becoming East Geduld Road southwards and Enstra Road eastwards. It ends shortly thereafter at a junction with the R555 route (Welgedacht Road) in the Everest suburb.
