= M46 (Johannesburg) =

Metropolitan route in Greater Johannesburg, South Africa

Metropolitan route M46

Route information
- Maintained by Johannesburg Roads Agency and Gauteng Department of Roads and Transport

Major junctions
- West end: M31 / M38 in Tulisa Park

- N3 / N12 near Tulisa Park M48 near Rand Airport M93 in Germiston M37 in Germiston M49 in Germiston M53 in Germiston M39 in Germiston M35 near Reiger Park; R21 in Boksburg M56 in Boksburg M43 near Brakpan; R23 in Brakpan M45 / M56 in Brakpan; R51 in Springs
- East end: R29 in Springs

Location
- Country: South Africa

Highway system
- Numbered routes of South Africa
← M45	→ M47

The M46 is a short metropolitan route in Greater Johannesburg, South Africa. It connects Tulisa Park in Johannesburg South with Springs via Germiston, Boksburg and Brakpan.

== Route ==
The M46 begins at a junction with the M31 road (Heidelberg Road) in the suburb of Tulisa Park in Johannesburg South. West of this junction, it is the M38 road. The M46 begins by going eastwards as Rand Airport Road, flying over the N17 highway and meeting the N3/N12 highway (Johannesburg Eastern Bypass) (northbound only), to enter the city of Germiston and meet the M48 road in the suburb of Gosforth Park.

The M48 joins the M46 and they are one road eastwards before the M48 becomes its own road eastwards just north of Rand Airport. The M46 continues east-north-east into the southern part of the Germiston City Centre as Power Street, meeting the M93 road (Refinery Road), the M37 road (Joubert Street), the M49 road (Webber Road) and the M53 road (Meyer Street; Victoria Street).

The M46 becomes Linton Jones Street and proceeds eastwards to meet the M39 road, where it becomes Lower Boksburg Road. It continues eastwards to enter the city of Boksburg and meet the northern terminus of the M35 road just north of the Reiger Park suburb, where it changes its name to Commissioner Street. It enters Boksburg Central in an easterly direction, passing under the R21 road (Rondebult Road). In Boksburg Central, it makes a right and left turn to become Leeuwpoort Street and at the eastern end of the CBD, it becomes Jubilee Street towards the south-east.

It crosses the M43 road (Van Dyk Road) to enter the town of Brakpan, first bypassing the Brakpan Airfield and passing through the Dalpark Suburb to meet the R23 road (Heidelberg Road). It enters the Brakpan Town Centre eastwards as Athlone Avenue and then reaches a junction, where it becomes Van Der Walt Road via a left turn. It then becomes Voortrekker Road eastwards, meeting the M45 road and the M56 road at the Prince George Avenue junction. The M46 becomes Prince George Avenue south-eastwards before becoming Olympia Road eastwards, where it enters the city of Springs. It becomes South Main Reef Road and meets the R51 road to enter the Springs City Centre. It passes through the Springs CBD eastwards and then enters the suburb of Cassledale, where it ends at a junction with the R29 road (Ermelo Road).
