= M90 (Johannesburg) =

Metropolitan route in Greater Johannesburg, South Africa

Metropolitan route M90

Route information
- Maintained by Johannesburg Roads Agency and Gauteng Department of Roads and Transport
- Length: 4.3 km (2.7 mi)

Major junctions
- West end: M39 / R25 at Kempton Park West

- M88 at Edleen M92 at Edleen M86 at Edleen M84 near Edleen M57 at Kempton Park CBD
- East end: M91 at Kempton Park CBD

Location
- Country: South Africa

Highway system
- Numbered routes of South Africa
| ← M89 | → M91 |

The M90 is a short metropolitan route in Greater Johannesburg, South Africa. It is made up of one street (CR Swart Drive) in the city of Kempton Park, connecting Kempton Park West with the CBD.

== Route ==
The M90 begins as an off-ramp of the M39 road (Zuurfontein Avenue; east southbound only) in Kempton Park West, adjacent to the M39's interchange with the R25 road (Modderfontein Road). It goes eastwards as CR Swart Drive, meeting the M88 road (Parkland Ave; Rienert Ave) at the next junction adjacent to Kempton Gate Shopping Centre and separating Edleen in the north from Esther Park in the south. It continues eastwards, meeting the M92 road (Green Avenue) just north of Dries Niemandt Park (Barnard Stadium) before meeting the southern terminus of the M86 road (Duvenhage Road).

It continues eastwards to reach a junction with the M84 road (Kelvin Street) adjacent to Festival Mall in Esther Park Extension 9. It continues eastwards to meet the M57 road (Pretoria Road) at the next junction adjacent to Kempton Park Civic Centre. It continues eastwards, separating Kempton Park Extension 2 from the Kempton Park CBD, to reach its end at a junction with the M91 road (Monument Road) adjacent to the Kempton Park Police Station.
