= M43 (Johannesburg) =

Metropolitan route in Greater Johannesburg, South Africa

Metropolitan route M43

Route information
- Maintained by Department of Roads and Transport (Gauteng)
- Length: 39.7 mi (63.9 km)

Major junctions
- South end: M53 Brickfield Road, Vosloorus

- N3 Exit 89 Vosloorus; R103 Vredebos; R21 Rondebult Road, Dawn Park; M46 Jubilee Road, Van Dyk Park; R29 / M56 Commissioner Street, Boksburg East; M44 North Rand Road, Lakefield; N12 Bardene; R21 Atlas Road, Bonaero Park; M45 Great North Road, Bonaero Park; M32 Pomona Road, Kempton Park AH; M45 Van Riebeeck Road, Kempton Park AH; M91 Monument Road, Glen Marais

- North end: M57 Pretoria Road, Birchleigh

Location
- Country: South Africa
- Major cities: Vosloorus, Boksburg, Benoni, Kempton Park

Highway system
- Numbered routes of South Africa
| ← M41 | → M44 |

The M43 is a metropolitan route, South Africa that connects Vosloorus with the Birchleigh suburb of Kempton Park via Boksburg.

It is an alternative route to the R21 route for travel between Kempton Park and Vosloorus.

== Route ==
The M43 begins in Vosloorus, at a junction with the M53 (Brickfield Road). It begins by going eastwards as Bierman Road to reach an interchange with the N3 freeway and enter the southern part of Boksburg. It continues by going north-east through Vredebos as Barry Marais Road to reach a junction with the R103. It continues north-east and flies over the M35 (Heidelberg Road) before passing through the suburb of Villa Liza and meeting the southern terminus of the R21 (Rondebult Road) in the suburb of Dawn Park.

It continues north-east as Barry Marais Road before turning north and flying over the R554 (North Boundary Road) in the suburb of Van Dyk Park and after a short distance crosses under the N17 freeway. At the junction with the M46 (Jubilee Street), it becomes Van Dyk Road northwards and is the road separating Boksburg to the west from Benoni to the east. It bypasses the townships of Wattville and Actionville to the west and Boksburg East to the east.

It continues northwards to reach a junction with Commissioner Street east of Boksburg Central and west of Benoni Central, where it forms an interchange with the R29 (Main Reef Road) via Commissioner Street. The M43 continues north as Atlas Road, intersecting with the M44 (North Rand Road; Lakefield Avenue) before forming an interchange with the N12 freeway.

It continues northwards, separating the suburbs of Impala Park to the west and Atlasville to the east before entering the city of Kempton Park, bypassing O. R. Tambo International Airport to the east. In Bonaero Park, the M43 reaches a junction, where the road northwards joins the R21 freeway. At this junction, the M43 turns eastwards and at the next junction with the M45, the M43 turns northwards onto Great North Road to be cosigned with it.

As Great North Road, the M43/M45 flies over the R21 freeway to enter the northern suburbs of Kempton Park and reach an interchange with the M32 (Pomona Road). At the next junction, the two roads split, with the M45 becoming Van Riebeeck Road westwards and the M43 becoming Dann Road northwards to pass through the Glen Marais suburb of Kempton Park, where it forms a large junction with the northern terminus of the M91 (Monument Road). Further north, at the Birchleigh AH suburb, the road turns left onto Veld street and after 100m, it turns right onto Vlei Street to head northwards. After 1 km, the M43 reaches its northern terminus at a t-junction with the M57 (Pretoria Road) just east of the suburb of Birchleigh.
