= M44 (Johannesburg) =

Metropolitan route in Greater Johannesburg, South Africa

Metropolitan route M44

Route information
- Maintained by Johannesburg Roads Agency and Gauteng Department of Roads and Transport
- Length: 25.6 km (15.9 mi)

Major junctions
- West end: M39 in Elandsfontein, Germiston

- M57 in Elandsfontein, Germiston; N12 in Witfield, Boksburg; R21 in Jansen Park, Boksburg; M41 in Jansen Park, Boksburg M43 in Lakefield, Benoni; R23 in Farrarmere, Benoni M45 in Northmead, Benoni M32 in Petit, Benoni
- East end: R51 in Petit, Benoni

Location
- Country: South Africa

Highway system
- Numbered routes of South Africa
| ← M43 | → M45 |

The M44 is a short metropolitan route in Greater Johannesburg, South Africa. It connects the Elandsfontein industrial suburb in the northern part of Germiston with Petit in the north-eastern part of Benoni.

== Route ==
The M44 begins in the industrialized suburb of Elandsfontein (south of Isando) in the northern part of Germiston, at a junction with the M39 road (Lazarus Mawela Road). It begins by going eastwards as North Reef Road to reach a junction with the M57 road (Ntemi Ncwane Road). The M57 joins the M44 and they are one road eastwards up to the next junction, where the M57 becomes its own road northwards towards Kempton Park. Here, the M44 turns to the south-east as Jet Park Road and proceeds to cross the N12 highway to enter the northern part of the city of Boksburg.

Just after crossing the N12, at the North Rand Road junction in the suburb of Witfield, the M44 becomes North Rand Road eastwards by way of a left turn. It proceeds eastwards to meet the R21 road (Rietfontein Road) adjacent to East Rand Mall in the Jansen Park suburb. Just after East Rand Mall, the M44 meets the M41 road (Rondebult Road). It proceeds eastwards, through the Bardene suburb, to reach a junction with the M43 road (Atlas Road), where it leaves the city of Boksburg and enters the city of Benoni.

In Benoni, the M44 passes through the Lakefield suburb before it crosses back to the northern side of the N12 highway and enters the Farrarmere suburb (just north of Benoni Central), where it meets the R23 road (Tom Jones Street; Bunyan Street). It continues eastwards as Fifth Avenue through the southern part of the Northmead suburb to reach a junction with the M45 road (Snake Road). The M44 joins the M45 and they are one road northwards up to the next junction, where the M45 becomes its own road to the north-west and the M44 turns to the north-north-east as Pretoria Road.

The M44 heads north-east for 10 kilometres, through the Rynfield and Rynpark suburbs, to reach the suburb of Petit, where it meets the eastern terminus of the M32 road (Birch Road). It goes for another 1.5 kilometres north-east to reach its end at a junction with the R51 road.
