= R21 (South Africa) =

Road in South Africa

Provincial route R21

Route information
- Maintained by SANRAL and GDRT
- Length: 67.6 km (42.0 mi)

Major junctions
- North end: M5 / M7 / M18 in Pretoria
- N1 in Centurion; R25 near Tembisa; R23 near Kempton Park; R24 at OR Tambo Int'l; N12 near Boksburg; R29 in Boksburg; N17 near Boksburg
- South end: N3 at Vosloorus

Location
- Country: South Africa
- Provinces: Gauteng
- Major cities: Pretoria; Centurion; Tembisa; Kempton Park; Boksburg; Vosloorus

Highway system
- Numbered routes of South Africa
← N21	→ R22

The R21 is a major north–south provincial route (with a freeway portion designated as a National Road) in eastern Gauteng Province, South Africa. Built in the early 1970s, it remains one of two freeways (the other being the N1) linking Pretoria with Johannesburg, via the R24. As the eastern of the two freeways, it links the Pretoria city centre with OR Tambo International Airport and Boksburg. Between the Solomon Mahlangu Drive on-ramp in Monument Park, Pretoria, and the N12 interchange in Boksburg, the R21 is an 8 lane highway and motorway (freeway), with 4 lanes in each direction. It has off-ramps leading to Irene, Olifantsfontein, Benoni, and Kempton Park. The route intersects the N1 highway (Eastern Pretoria Bypass; Danie Joubert Freeway) near Centurion, the R24 near the airport, the N12 and N17 in Boksburg, and the N3 near Vosloorus on the East Rand, where it ends. The section from the N12 to the N3 is not a freeway. The R21 is also designated as the P157.

The R21 is the lowest "R" designated route number in South Africa. The portion of the R21 where it exists as a freeway, from the M10 Solomon Mahlangu Drive off-ramp in Pretoria to the N12 Freeway in the East Rand was declared a National Road in 2008, as part of the Gauteng Freeway Improvement Project, when it was also transferred to the South African National Roads Agency. The improvement project increased the number of lanes (previously, the freeway portion had been a dual carriageway freeway, with 2 lanes in each direction, from the Rietfontein Interchange to Pretoria), and installed lighting along the length of the freeway section.

As a result of the Gauteng Freeway Improvement Project, the freeway section of the R21 was effectively declared as an e-toll highway (with open road tolling) from 3 December 2013 onwards. The South African government announced on 28 March 2024 that e-tolls in Gauteng would officially be shut down on 11 April 2024 at midnight, therefore returning the R21 to being a toll-free route.

== Route ==
Detailed Route

The R21 begins just north-east of Fountains Valley in Pretoria as Nelson Mandela Drive, at a roundabout intersection with the M18 Christina De Wit Avenue, M7 and M5 metropolitan roads of Pretoria, heading south-east. After Fountains Valley, the R21 passes by Monument Park. After Monument Park, the R21 becomes a freeway (separating the city of Centurion to the west from Pretoria East to the east), with the first off-ramp being the M10 (Solomon Mahlangu Drive) east of the Waterkloof Air Force Base.

Just after Solomon Mahlangu Drive, near the suburb of Pierre van Ryneveld Park, the R21 intersects with the N1 highway (Danie Joubert Freeway; Pretoria Eastern Bypass), which is the freeway between Johannesburg and Polokwane. The Interchange is named the Flying Saucer Interchange. After the N1 Interchange, the R21 freeway continues southwards and has 10 off-ramps and interchanges for the remaining 43 km length of its freeway section.

The R21 intersects with the M31 (Irene Off-ramp), R562 (Olifantsfontein Off-ramp), R25 (Birchleigh/Tembisa Off-ramp), R23 (Benoni Off-ramp), M32 (Pomona Off-ramp), M43 (Atlas Off-ramp), M96 (Kempton Park Central Off-ramp), R24 (O.R. Tambo International Airport Interchange), M41 (Jet Park Off-ramp) and N12 (Rietfontein Interchange).

After the M31 Irene off-ramp, the R21 leaves the City of Tshwane Metropolitan Municipality and enters the City of Ekurhuleni Metropolitan Municipality. From the M31 Irene off-ramp up to just after the O.R. Tambo International Airport, the R21 is followed by the M57 metropolitan route from north to south (which can be used as an alternative route when there are roadworks on the highway). From the R562 Olifantsfontein off-ramp to the R25 Birchleigh off-ramp, the R21 bypasses the township of Thembisa (forms its eastern boundary).

At the O.R. Tambo International Airport, south-east of Kempton Park Central, the R21 meets the R24 freeway, which connects the airport with Johannesburg Central in the west. Via the R24 (named the Albertina Sisulu Freeway), the R21 is the only freeway apart from the Ben Schoeman Freeway (designated as the N1) that links Pretoria with Johannesburg.

Entering Boksburg (just after the M41 Jet Park off-ramp), the R21 forms an interchange with the N12 highway to Johannesburg in the west and Witbank (eMalahleni) in the east at the Rietfontein Interchange, which marks the end of the R21 being a freeway. The R21 becomes Rietfontein Road when it junctions with the M44 road (North Rand Road) at the next junction by East Point Mall. Further south, at the suburb of Boksburg North, the R21 meets the M41 again and continues by way of a right turn to become Rondebult Road. The R21 then meets the R29 (Cason Road) and continues south, passing to the west of Boksburg Central.

After Boksburg Central, the R21 crosses the N17 highway at Elspark and continues south through Sunward Park. After Sunward Park, the R21 heads south-south-east, meeting the R554 (North Boundary Road) and intersects the M43 road (Barry Marais Road) for the second time at a t-junction in Dawn Park.

The R21 and the M43 are co-signed south-west. As Bierman Road, the R21/M43 pass over the M35 road (Germiston-Heidelberg Road), intersect with the R103, and reach an intersection with the N3 freeway just east of Vosloorus, which marks the end of the R21.

== Albertina Sisulu Freeway ==
In 2007, the Gauteng Provincial Government announced that it would name the R21 freeway between Pretoria and the O. R. Tambo International Airport as the Albertina Sisulu Freeway. The R24 route from OR Tambo International Airport south-west to Bedfordview was also named the Albertina Sisulu Freeway just before the 2010 FIFA World Cup and so, these two highways (the R21 from Pretoria to the airport and the R24 from the airport to Bedfordview) are together known as the Albertina Sisulu Freeway.
