= R548 (South Africa) =

Regional route in South Africa

Regional route R548

Route information
- Length: 52 km (32 mi)

Major junctions
- North end: R50 near Delmas
- R29 at Devon; N17 at Devon
- South end: R51 near Balfour

Location
- Country: South Africa
- Major cities: Devon

Highway system
- Numbered routes of South Africa
← R547	→ R549

The R548 is a Regional Route in South Africa that connects Delmas with Balfour via Devon.

== Route ==
=== Mpumalanga ===
Its northern terminus is the R50 east of Delmas, Mpumalanga. From there it first runs south, then south-east, crossing into Gauteng to reach Devon.

=== Gauteng ===
In Devon, it is briefly cosigned with the R29 when it intersects with it before leaving to the south-west. It gives off the west-south-westerly R550 and crosses the N17. It re-enters Mpumalanga and crosses the Suikerbosrand River to end its route at an intersection with the R51 just north of Balfour.
