= Bredell land occupation =

The Bredell land Occupation occurred on the East Rand, Johannesburg, in South Africa, in 2001 near to Johannesburg International Airport. It was quickly evicted but became a major national news story since a political party was accused of encouraging the action.

== Occupation ==
Spurred by the land invasions in Zimbabwe, the derelict Elandsfontein Farm No. 412 in Bredell, Kempton Park (outside Johannesburg) was squatted by 5,000 poor black people from a nearby overcrowded township called Tembisa in early 2001.

The 23 hectares of land were owned partly by the state and partly by private owners, including electricity supplier Eskom, state-owned transport company Transnet and a company called Groengras Eiendomme.

The Pan Africanist Congress of Azania (PAC), a small political party, encouraged the occupation by taking R25 ($3) from each squatter, which was designed to pay for legal assistance and water, but the squatters believed they were buying their plots with the money.

== Eviction ==
The state got a court order in July permitting them to evict the landgrab. The shacks built on occupied land were then destroyed between July and August. Women tried to resist by shaming the evictors with their nakedness but the eviction went ahead. It was carried out by the private security firm MacLegal.

Around 200 people were arrested by the police, with 90 released and 110 held in custody. Minister of Agriculture and Land Affairs Thoko Didiza said that if it could be proven that PAC took money for the occupation, they would be charged with various crimes including theft. PAC representatives denied they had organised the occupation.

== Aftermath ==
Many squatters had nowhere to go, some were housed in churches by the South African Council of Churches.

The Pretoria High Court confirmed its earlier verdict for eviction in November 2001. The state argued that the eviction was justified because of the lack of clean drinking water, and dangers posed by an underground petrol pipe and electric cables. The PAC stated that the government was obliged to rehouse the squatters since they had lived there more than six months.

Professor Gillian Hart described it as a "profound moral crisis for the post-apartheid state".
