= M63 (Johannesburg) =

Metropolitan route in Greater Johannesburg, South Africa

Metropolitan route M63

Route information
- Maintained by Johannesburg Roads Agency and Gauteng Department of Roads and Transport
- Length: 20.1 km (12.5 mi)

Major junctions
- South end: R550 in Nigel
- M45 in Dunnottar; N17 in Springs
- North end: R51 in Springs

Location
- Country: South Africa

Highway system
- Numbered routes of South Africa
← M61	→ M64

The M63 is a short metropolitan route in Greater Johannesburg, South Africa. It is an alternative route to the R51 road between Springs and Nigel.

== Route ==
The M63 begins in Springs, in the suburb of Pollak Park (just south of the town centre), at a junction with the R51 road (Springs Road). It begins by going southwards as Tonk Meter Road to cross the N17 highway and enter the Selcourt suburb, where it becomes Coaton Avenue eastwards before becoming Nigel Road southwards.

It enters the town of Nigel, first passing by the suburb of Dunnottar (where it meets the south-eastern terminus of the M45 road) before reaching its southern terminus at a junction with the R550 road about 2 kilometres west of the Nigel Town Centre.
