= M35 (Johannesburg) =

Metropolitan route in Greater Johannesburg, South Africa

Metropolitan route M35

Route information
- Maintained by Johannesburg Roads Agency and Gauteng Department of Roads and Transport
- Length: 14.1 km (8.8 mi)

Major junctions
- South end: R103 at Boksburg AH
- R554 at Rondebult
- North end: M46 at Martin du Preezville

Location
- Country: South Africa

Highway system
- Numbered routes of South Africa
← M34	→ M36

The M35 is a short metropolitan route in Greater Johannesburg, South Africa. The entire route is in the City of Ekurhuleni Metropolitan Municipality.

== Route ==
The M35 begins at a junction with the R103 east of Vosloorus in the far southern part of Boksburg. It begins by going north-east as Heidelberg Road and turns north to fly over the M43 road (Barry Marais Road). It bypasses the suburbs of Dawn Park and Rondebult and reaches a junction with the R554 road (Van Dyk Road; North Boundary Road). It continues northwards, separating the eastern suburbs of Germiston from the western suburbs of Boksburg.

From the R554 junction, the M35 goes northwards as Heidelberg Road, passing through the Elspark suburb, to fly over the N17 highway and reach a T-junction with Brug Street just east of the Elsburg suburb of Germiston. Via a right turn, the M35 continues northwards, separating the Reiger Park suburb of Boksburg from the eastern part of Germiston, to reach its northern terminus at a junction with the M46 road (Commissioner Street) near the Martin Du Preezville suburb.
