= M92 (Johannesburg) =

Metropolitan route in Greater Johannesburg, South Africa

Metropolitan route M92

Route information
- Maintained by Johannesburg Roads Agency and Gauteng Department of Roads and Transport
- Length: 6.1 km (3.8 mi)

Major junctions
- South end: M59 in Croydon

- M39 in Croydon M32 in Cresslawn; M90 in Edleen

- North end: M86 in Edleen

Location
- Country: South Africa

Highway system
- Numbered routes of South Africa
| ← M91 | → M93 |

The M92 is a short metropolitan route in Greater Johannesburg, South Africa. The entire route is within the city of Kempton Park.

== Route ==
The M92 begins at a junction with the M59 Road (Driefontein Road) in the suburb of Croydon. It begins by going north, then north-east, to reach a junction with the M39 road (Isando Road). It proceeds north-east, then north, as Green Avenue to separate Spartan to the east from Cresslawn in the west. It then reaches a junction with the M32 road (Plane Road) and proceeds northwards, bypassing Dries Niemandt Park (Barnard Stadium), to meet the M90 road (CR Swart Drive) at the next junction and enter the suburb of Edleen. In Edleen, it turns towards the north-east and reaches its end at a roundabout junction with the M86 road (Duvenhage Avenue) at a place known as the Edleen Circle (just south of Van Riebeeck Park).
