= M91 (Johannesburg) =

Metropolitan route in Greater Johannesburg, South Africa

Metropolitan route M91

Route information
- Maintained by Johannesburg Roads Agency and Gauteng Department of Roads and Transport
- Length: 3.6 km (2.2 mi)

Major junctions
- South end: M96 in Kempton Park CBD

- M90 in Kempton Park CBD M45 near Nimrod Park

- North end: M43 in Glen Marais

Location
- Country: South Africa

Highway system
- Numbered routes of South Africa
← M90	→ M92

The M91 is a short metropolitan route in Greater Johannesburg, South Africa. The entire route consists of one street (Monument Road) in the city of Kempton Park.

== Route ==
The M91 begins at a junction with the M96 road (Amon Ngulele Road; Long Street) in the Kempton Park CBD. It goes northwards, meeting the eastern terminus of the M90 road (CR Swart Drive), passing through Kempton Park Extension 2 and 4, to reach a junction with the M45 road (Van Riebeeck Road) east of Allen Grove and west of Nimrod Park. It continues northwards, forming the western border of the Aston Manor suburb, to end at a junction with the M43 road (Dann Road) in the Glen Marais suburb.
