= M59 (Johannesburg) =

Metropolitan route in Greater Johannesburg, South Africa

Metropolitan route M59

Route information
- Maintained by Johannesburg Roads Agency and Gauteng Department of Roads and Transport
- Length: 7.4 km (4.6 mi)

Major junctions
- North end: M37 near Edenvale CBD

- M78 at Eden Glen M92 at Croydon; M16 at Croydon; R24 near Isando M99 at Isando M78 at Isando

- South end: M39 at Isando

Location
- Country: South Africa

Highway system
- Numbered routes of South Africa
← M57	→ M60

The M59 is a short metropolitan route in Greater Johannesburg, South Africa. The entire route is in the western part of the City of Ekurhuleni Metropolitan Municipality, particularly in Kempton Park and Edenvale.

== Route ==
The M59 begins at a junction with the M37 road (Lungile Mtshali Road) in Edenvale (north of the town centre). It begins by going eastwards as Terrace Road, through the Eastleigh and Eden Glen suburbs, to reach a junction with the M78 road (Harris Avenue) and enter the industrial suburb of Sebenza.

In Sebenza, the M59 turns to the south-east as Lunik Drive, then as Driefontein Road, to separate the Isandovale suburb of Edenvale in the west from the Croydon suburb of Kempton Park in the east, where it meets the southern terminus of the M92 road (Serena Road). Immediately after Isandovale/Croydon, the M59 reaches a junction with the M16 road (Barbzon Road) and proceeds to meet and cross the R24 Highway (Albertina Sisulu Freeway) as Lazarus Mawela Road (formerly Barbara Road).

Immediately after crossing the R24, the M59 meets the M99 road (Electron Avenue; Herman Street) and separates Klopper Park (the northernmost suburb of Germiston) in the west from the Isando Industrial Area (the southernmost suburb of Kempton Park) in the east, where it meets the M78 road again. It ends shortly thereafter at a junction with the M39 road.
