= R549 (South Africa) =

Regional route in South Africa

Regional route R549

Route information
- Length: 52 km (32 mi)

Major junctions
- North end: R23 in Heidelberg
- R54 near Vaal Dam
- South end: R716 in Deneysville

Location
- Country: South Africa
- Major cities: Heidelberg, Deneysville

Highway system
- Numbered routes of South Africa
← R548	→ R550

The R549 is a Regional Route in South Africa that connects Heidelberg in Gauteng with Deneysville in the Free State.

== Route ==
Its northern terminus is a junction with the R23 in Heidelberg from which it heads south-west. It bypasses Ratanda, crosses the Suikerbosrand River and meets the R54 road before crossing the Vaal River west of the Vaal Dam into the Free State and reaching an intersection with the R716 in Deneysville, marking its end.
