= R550 (South Africa) =

Regional route in South Africa

Regional route R550

Route information
- Maintained by GDRT
- Length: 93 km (58 mi)

Major junctions
- East end: R548 in Devon
- R42 / R51 in Nigel; R23 near Tsakane; R103 near Heidelberg; N3 near Heidelberg; R59 near Garthdale
- West end: R82 / R554 near Kibler Park, Johannesburg South

Location
- Country: South Africa
- Major cities: Devon, Nigel, Tsakane, Katlehong, Johannesburg South

Highway system
- Numbered routes of South Africa
← R549	→ R551

The R550 is a Regional Route in Gauteng, South Africa that connects Johannesburg South with Devon via Katlehong and Nigel.

== Route ==
Its western terminus is a junction with the R82 and R554 roads in Johannesburg South, just south of Kibler Park and north of Walkerville (east of Lenasia). From there, the R550 goes south-east for 15 kilometres, following the Klip River, to reach a T-junction near the Klipriver Business Park. At this junction, the R550 turns eastwards and meets the R59 highway at an interchange just after.

From the R59 interchange, the R550 goes eastwards for 20 kilometres, crossing the Klip River, meeting the M61 metropolitan route and passing through Garthdale (Kliprivier), skirting the southern border of Katlehong and forming the northern border of the Suikerbosrand Nature Reserve, to reach an interchange with the N3 highway north of Heidelberg. Just after the N3 interchange, it meets the R103 and after another 8 kilometres, it meets the R23.

From the R23 junction, the R550 goes eastwards for 10 kilometres, forming the southern border of the townships of Tsakane and Duduza, to meet the southern terminus of the M63 metropolitan route at a T-junction in the town of Nigel. It becomes the road east-south-east for 2 kilometres up to the 4-way-junction before the Glenvarloch suburb, where it meets the R51 route coming from Springs in the north and the R42 route coming from Heidelberg in the south-west. The 3 routes become co-signed eastwards from this junction for 2 kilometres, forming the northern border of Nigel's CBD, up to the junction with Balfour Road, where the R51 & R550 split from the R42 to become Balfour Road towards the south-east. Just after crossing the Blesbokspruit in the Laversburg suburb of Nigel, the R550 leaves Balfour Road (R51) and becomes its own road eastwards.

From Nigel, the R550 continues east-north-east for 30 kilometres, crossing over the N17 just before reaching its eastern terminus in Devon, at an intersection with the R548, just south of the R548's intersection with the R29.
