= Ke-Ditselana Tourism and Multi-Cultural Village =

Ke-Ditselana Tourism and Cultural Village
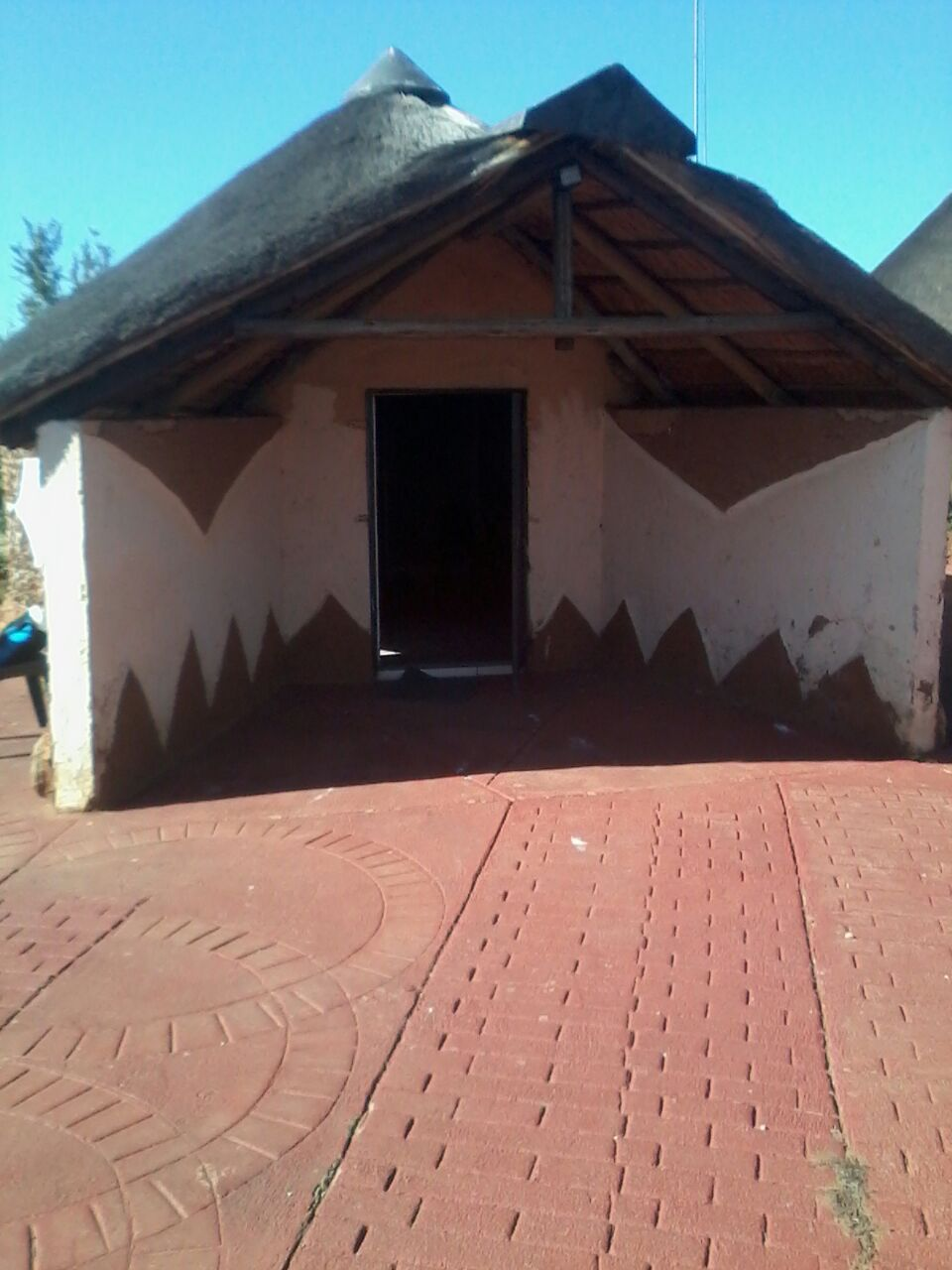

General information
- Status: Operational
- Type: Cultural site
- Location: 6672 Venus Dr, Vosloorus Extension 20 Ekurhuleni Johannesburg, South Africa
- Coordinates: 26°22′33″S 28°10′39.5″E

Ke-ditselana tourism and multi-cultural village is built in vosloorus extension 20 Ekurhuleni in 2004. Its main purpose is to teach tourists and local people about the South Africa culture.

== History ==
Ke-Ditselana tourism and multi-cultural village was originally built in 2004 in Vosloorus extension 20 and it was leased to the community for a period of 20 years. Mr Mashinini, the manager of Ke-Ditselana said that the aim of building this village is to teach tourists and the people in the community about the different types of cultures of South Africa and how people celebrate their own cultures. The village contains information and buildings of all of nine different cultures namely IsiZulu, SeSotho, Swati, IsiNdebele, IsiXhosa, SePedi, TshiVenda, SeTswana and Tsonga.

== Architecture ==
The architecture at Ke-Ditselana Cultural Village includes straw-thatched Roundavels which is representative of the cultural aspect of the site Even though the buildings are still there most of them have cracked and some have collapsed due to lack of maintenance.

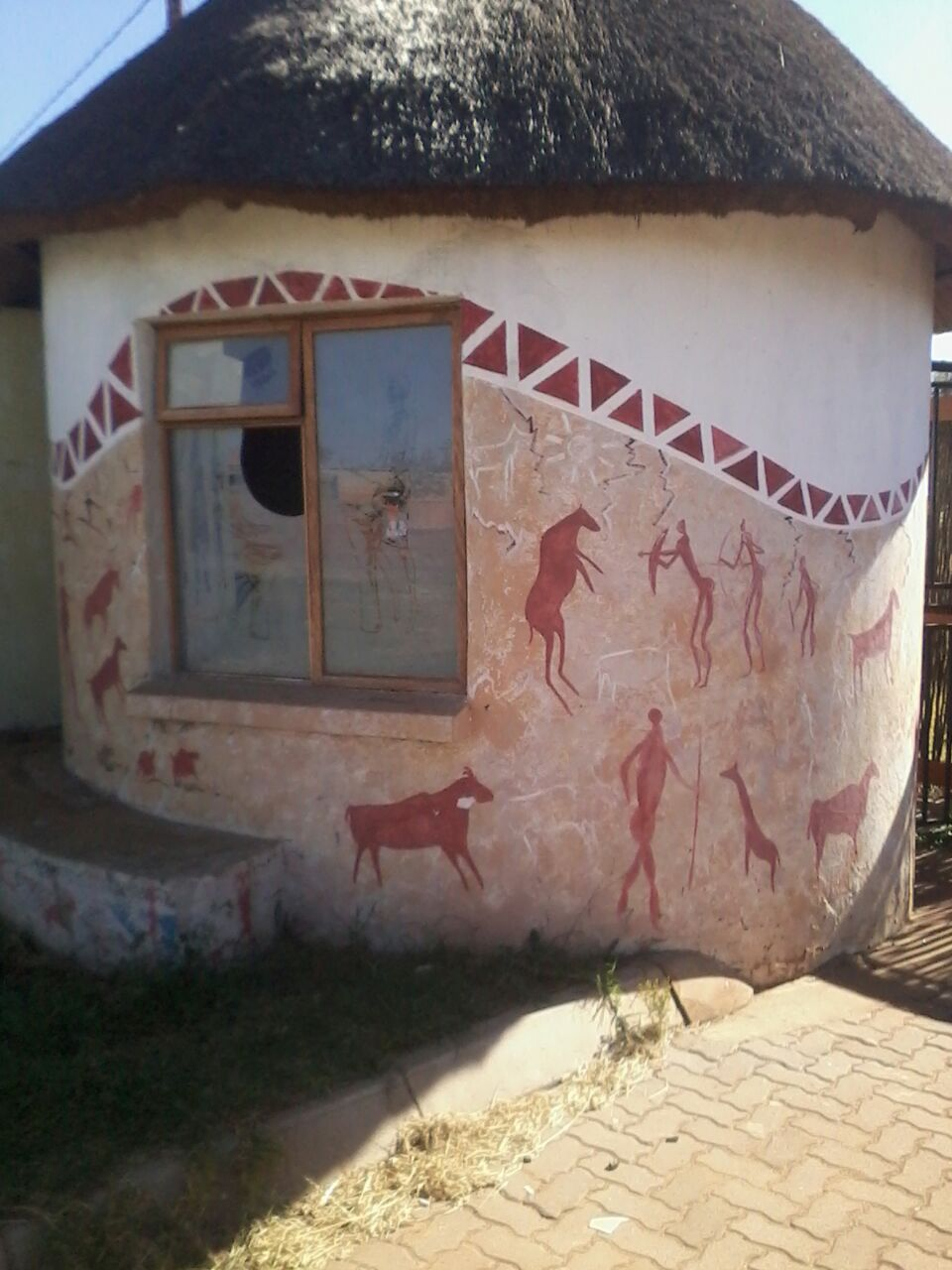
Ke-Ditselana Cultural Village hut

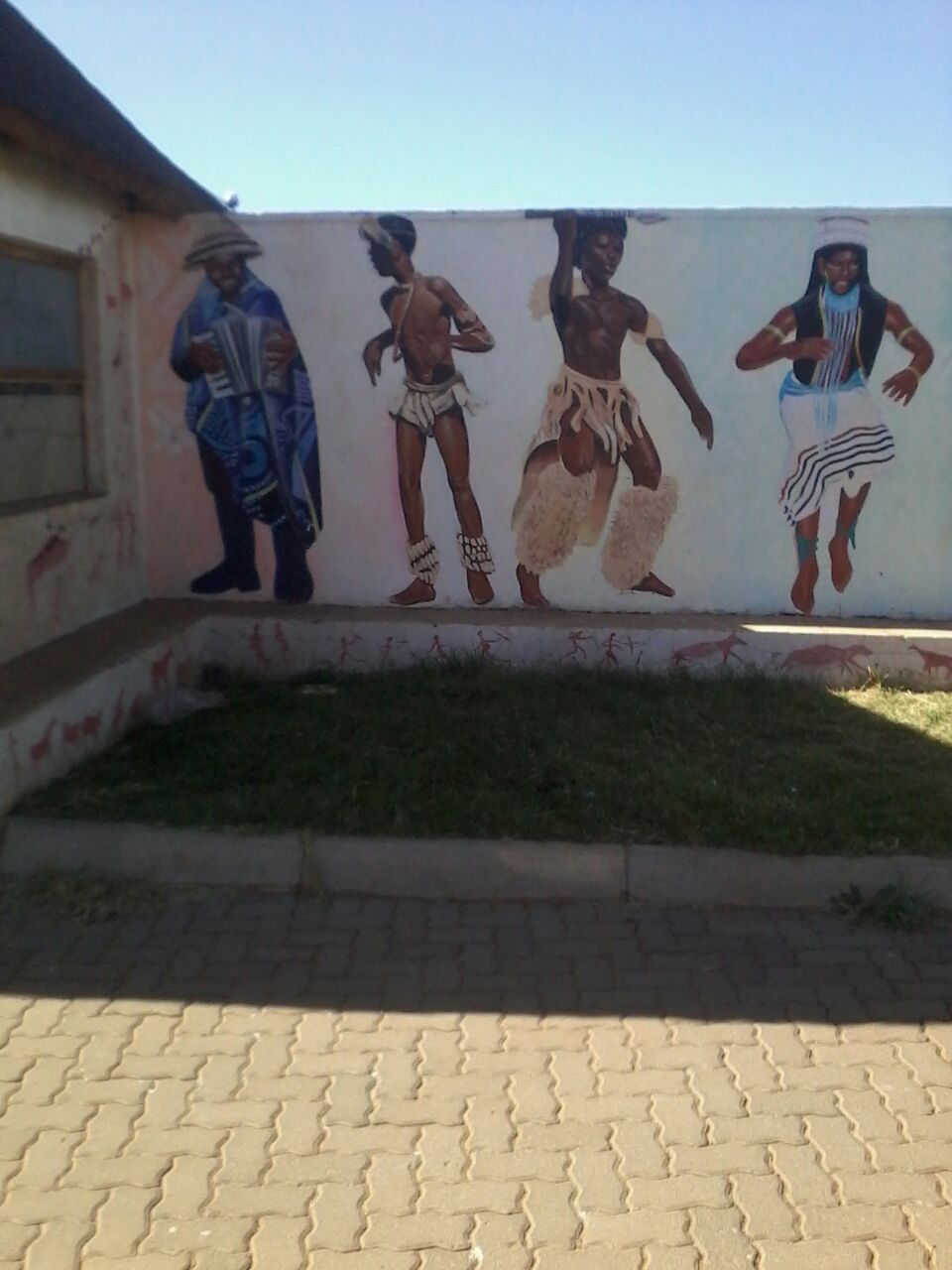
Ke-Ditselana Cultural Village wall mural

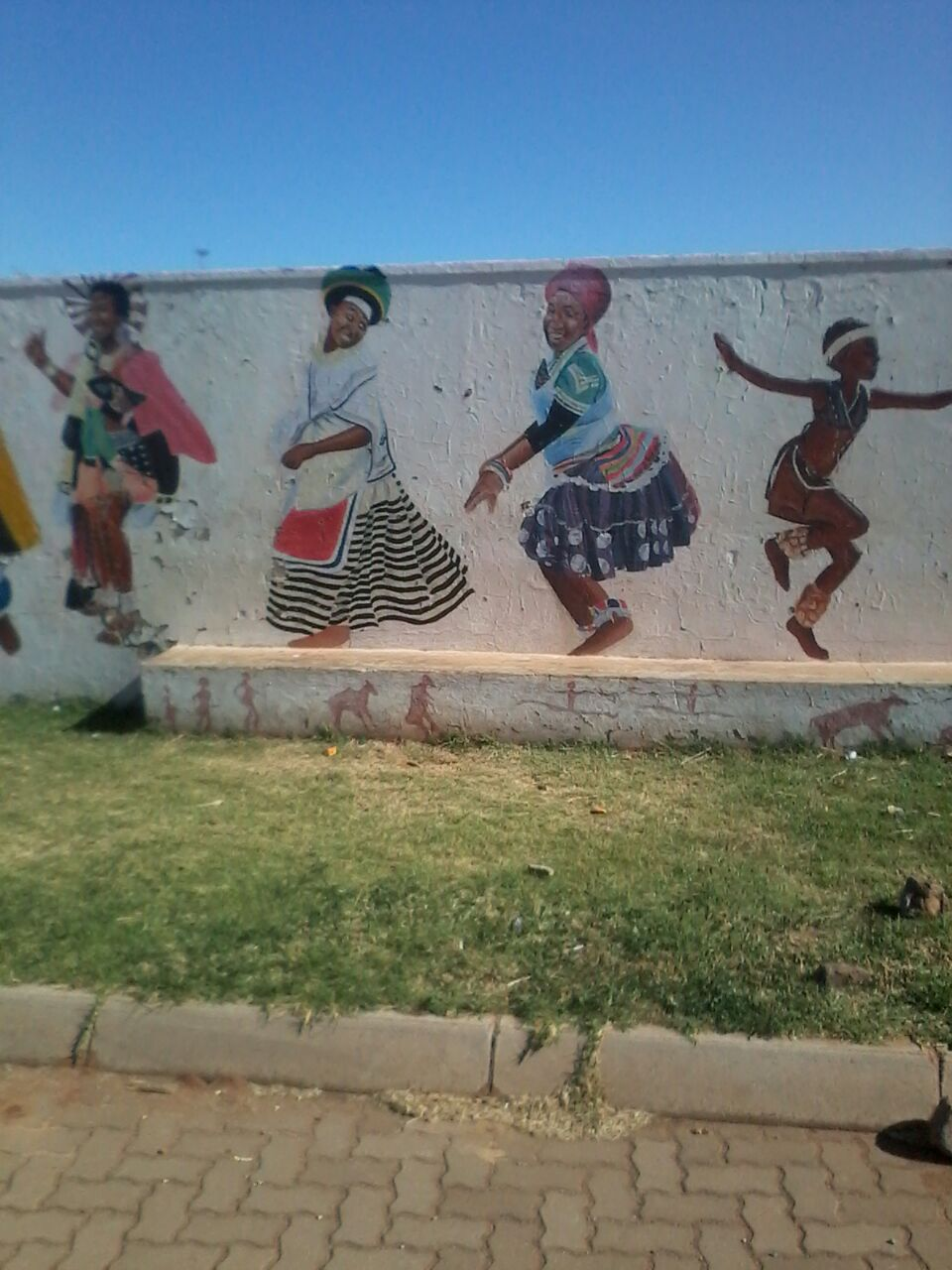
Ke-Ditselana Cultural Village wall mural

== Culture Groups ==
This cultural site represents all nine of South Africa's cultural groups.

== Other uses ==
Ke-Ditselana Cultural Village hosts events such as weddings, educational tours and conferences and people in the community celebrate the heritage day on 24 September. It is a home to a local youth organization called "THUSA BATJHA YOUTH ORGANISATION" (meaning help the youth in sesotho). The site also host the training programs, performing art, poetry and beat work which is done mostly by the local, it also provides the community with space for agriculture where they do farming and plantation.
