= M96 (Johannesburg) =

Metropolitan route in Greater Johannesburg, South Africa

Metropolitan route M96

Route information
- Maintained by Johannesburg Roads Agency and Gauteng Department of Roads and Transport
- Length: 1.7 km (1.1 mi)

Major junctions
- West end: M57 in Kempton Park

- M32 in Kempton Park; M91 in Kempton Park
- East end: R21 near OR Tambo Int'l

Location
- Country: South Africa

Highway system
- Numbered routes of South Africa
← M95	→ M97

The M96 is a short metropolitan route in Greater Johannesburg, South Africa. The entire route is within the CBD of Kempton Park and consists of two one-way streets (Amon Ngulele Road, formerly Voortrekker Road, westwards & Long Street eastwards).

== Route ==
The M96's eastern terminus is an interchange with the R21 highway adjacent to the freight entrance of O. R. Tambo International Airport. It goes westwards as Amon Ngulele Road through the Kempton Park CBD and passes under the M32 road (Petrus “Chilly” Magagula Road), intersecting with Monument Road (M91 road), bypassing the Kempton Square Shopping Centre, and ending at a junction with the M57 road (Pretoria Road) just south of the Kempton Park Civic Centre.

Amon Ngulele Road is a one-way street westwards from the R21 interchange to the M57 junction. Another one-way street is Long Street, which goes in the other direction from the M57 junction to the R21 interchange.
