= Rosemary Ndlovu =

South African serial killer (born 1978)

- Born: Nomia Rosemary Ndlovu; 1978 (age 47–48)
- Status: incarcerated
- Convictions: Murder, fraud
- Penalty: Life imprisonment

Details
- Victims: 6
- Span of crimes: 2012–2018
- Date apprehended: 2018

Nomia Rosemary Ndlovu (born 1978) is a South African convicted serial killer and former policewoman who was convicted in the deaths of six people – her live-in partner and five of her relatives – between 2012 and 2018. Her motive was to live off of their life and funeral insurance policies, having collected as much as R1.4 million (US$93,000) at the time of her arrest. In 2021 Ndlovu was sentenced to six concurrent life terms for the murders and a total of thirty years; ten years for four fraud counts, ten years for each of the seven incitement to commit murder charges and ten years for the attempted murder of her mother, Maria Mushawana.

== Early life ==
Nomia Rosemary Ndlovu was born in Bushbuckridge in Mpumalanga in one of the surrounding villages in around 1978. She attended primary and high school in Mpumalanga until she went to Johannesburg in search of greener pastures, where she later joined the South African Police Service. She later then went to training.

== Police career ==
Ndlovu entered the South African Police Service (SAPS) and was posted at the Tembisa police station, eventually being promoted to the rank of sergeant. While Ndlovu was regarded as a respected member of the police force, colleagues also recalled her as a gambling addict who sometimes bunked out of work to avoid loan sharks.

== Murders ==
Ndlovu's first victim was her cousin, Madala Witness Homu, who in March 2012 was found beaten to death in Olifantsfontein. For his death, Ndlovu would receive over R131 000 in insurance.

While staying at Ndlovu's house in June 2013, her sister Audrey was found murdered by a combination of poisoning and strangulation. Ndlovu received R717 421.17 in insurance from her death. The same month, Ndlovu's niece Zanele Motha was found murdered by beating; a death which Ndlovu would receive around R119,840 for.

In October 2015, Maurice Mabasa, her boyfriend and father of her child, was found murdered and dumped in Olifantsfontein with over 76 stab wounds. From Mabasa's death, Ndlovu would receive more than R131,000 in death policies which she had made in his name. In April 2017, her nephew Mayeni Mashaba was found murdered in Olifantsfontein, after having met up with Ndlovu the day before his murder.

Ndlovu's final victim was Brilliant Mashego, Ndlovu's nephew and Audrey's son, who was last seen alive in Ndlovu's company on 22 January 2018 in Bushbuckridge and found 2 days later on 24 January in Bushbuckridge. In court, Ndlovu admitted to having taken out funeral policies for Mashego.

== Arrest ==
Ndlovu's murder spree ended when she was arrested after being recorded trying to enlist an undercover police officer and another man, both posing as hitmen, to burn her sister Joyce and her five children to death inside her house.

== See also ==
- List of serial killers in South Africa
