= R51 (South Africa) =

Road in South Africa

Provincial route R51

Route information
- Maintained by GDRT and MDPWRT
- Length: 133 km (83 mi)

Major junctions
- North end: R25 / R50 near Bapsfontein
- N12 near Benoni; R29 in Springs; N17 in Springs; R42 in Nigel; R23 in Balfour
- South end: N3 / R54 north of Villiers

Location
- Country: South Africa
- Major cities: Bapsfontein, Springs, Nigel, Balfour

Highway system
- Numbered routes of South Africa
← R50	→ R52

The R51 is a provincial route in South Africa that connects Bapsfontein with the N3 north of Villiers, via Springs, Nigel and Balfour.

== Route ==
Detailed Route

=== Gauteng ===
The R51 begins at Bapsfontein, Ekurhuleni, Gauteng at the 4-way intersection with the R25 route and the R50 route (Delmas Road). As Pretoria Road, it heads south-south-west for 10 km up to Petit (east of Kempton Park and north-east of Benoni), where it meets the M44 metropolitan route and continues by way of a left turn to become Geldenhuys Street southwards. After 4 km, the R51 continues by way of a right turn at Aloe Road to become Kingsway Road, bypassing Benoni Farms.

As Kingsway Road, it makes up the western border of Daveyton, separating it from Benoni Farms, before crossing the N12 highway (Johannesburg-eMalahleni Highway). Just after the N12 crossing (by Kingsway), the R51 is joined by the R29 route from Benoni Central and they are one road southwards for 5 km before splitting in the vicinity of Springs (the R29 becomes 4th Avenue eastwards). By Wright Park, at the eastern terminus of the R554 route, the R51 turns eastwards to bypass the Springs town centre and by Springs Country Club, the R51 turns southwards.

From Springs, the R51 crosses the N17 highway and makes a 20 km journey south to Nigel. From Springs to Nigel, the R51 is followed by and is parallel to the M63 metropolitan route. In Nigel, at the main 4-way junction before the Glenverloch suburb, the R51 joins the road going east and is cosigned with the R42 route and the R550 route for 2 kilometres, making up the northern border of the Nigel CBD. At the Balfour Road junction, the R51 and the R550 split from the R42 road to become the road heading south-east. After the Laversburg suburb, just after crossing the Blesbokspruit, the R550 becomes its own road eastwards, leaving the R51 as Balfour Road southwards.

=== Mpumalanga ===
From Nigel, the R51 makes a south-south-easterly 33 km journey, crossing into Mpumalanga Province and crossing the Suikerbosrand River, meeting the R548, to Balfour. It enters Balfour southwards as Joubert Street, before turning east, then south at Dyer Street to cross the Balfour Railway southwards. After the Railway crossing, it makes a right turn at Johnny Mokoena Drive and then a left turn to become Joubert Street again.

South of Balfour, the R51 meets the bypassing R23 road (Heidelberg-Standerton Road) at a roundabout. From Balfour, The R51 makes a southward 40 km journey, passing Grootvlei and its power station, making a left turn, to end at a junction with the N3 freeway (In Mpumalanga, just north of the Vaal River, which separates it from the town of Villiers in the Free State Province on the other side). It meets the eastern end of the R54 route from Vereeniging at the same place.
