= Jill Trappler =

(b.1957) South African artist

- Born: 15 April 1957 (age 69); Benoni, Gauteng
- Occupation: Artist
- Years active: 30
- Known for: Painting; Weaving; Installations

Jill Trappler (born April 1957 in Gauteng, Benoni, South Africa) is a South African artist who works in several media, including painting, weaving, and installation.

Trappler's work is in various private, corporate, and public collections, including the National Museum of African Art, SANG, Vodacom, SABC, Investec, and Nandos UK. Trappler's work has been featured in several exhibitions including at the Association for Visual Arts Gallery in 2003, and the AVA Gallery in 2015, as well as on-line sites such as "Invaluable.com".

Trappler also trains aspiring artists in workshops such as the "Restructuring Two-dimensional Images" workshop at Kirstenbosch in 2019.
