= Tsietsi Mahoa =

South African soccer player

Personal information
- Date of birth: 9 February 1982 (age 44)
- Place of birth: Tembisa, South Africa
- Height: 1.70 m (5 ft 7 in)
- Position: Left-back

Youth career
- Tembisa Colchester
- Tembisa Young Movers
- Wits University

Senior career*
Years	Team	Apps	(Gls)
2001–2004	Wits University	43	(0)
2004–2010	Supersport United	117	(0)
2010–2014	Bloemfontein Celtic	71	(0)
2014–2015	Moroka Swallows	15	(0)

International career
2003	South Africa	1	(0)
- * Club domestic league appearances and goals

Tsietsi Mahoa (born 9 February 1982) is a South African former soccer player who played as a defender. He played for Wits University, Supersport United, Bloemfontein Celtic, Moroka Swallows and the South Africa national soccer team.
