= Olifantsfontein =

Olifantsfontein Clayville
- Location within Gauteng Location within South Africa Location within Africa
- Coordinates: 25.9581°S 28.2164°E
- Country: South Africa
- Province: Gauteng
- Municipality: Ekurhuleni

Area
  - Total: 14.05 km^{2} (5.42 sq mi)

Population (2011)
  - Total: 14,526
  - Density: 1,034/km^{2} (2,678/sq mi)

Racial makeup (2011)
  - Black African: 91.73%
  - White: 5.72%
  - Coloured: 1.77%
  - Indian/Asian: 0.32%
  - Other: 0.46%

First languages (2011)
  - Northern Sotho: 25.58%
  - Zulu: 18.07%
  - Sotho: 9.16%
  - Tsonga: 8.55%
  - Other: 38.64%
- Time zone: UTC+2 (SAST)
- Postal code (street): 1666
- PO box: 1665
- Area code: 011

Olifantsfontein, also known as Clayville, is a small town on the East Rand in the Gauteng Province of South Africa. It is located at the north-western corner of the City of Ekurhuleni Metropolitan Municipality, just north of the Thembisa township. As of the 2011 Census, the town has a population of 14,526 people.

Olifantsfontein is divided into 3 main suburbs, namely Clayville East (the entire area east of the passing Metrorail Line), Clayville Industrial (the entire area south of View Road, with many industrial operations) and Clayville CBD with its extensions (the area north of View Road).

The R562 road (Winnie Madikizela-Mandela Road; formerly Olifantsfontein Road) forms the boundary between Clayville and the Thembisa Township. Clayville also has the Irene Village to the north and Midrand to the west as its neighbours.

== History ==
While Olifantsfontein is currently part of the Ekurhuleni Metropolitan Municipality, it has close historical ties with Midrand in the neighbouring City of Johannesburg Metropolitan Municipality.

Olifantsfontein was established in the early 1840s by Frederik Andries Strydom as a farmland. It was only given the name Clayville in 1940.

It was believed that the railway between Pretoria in the north and the Witwatersrand in the south was going to pass through Halfway House (Midrand) but when it was built, it passed through Olifantsfontein instead of Midrand and when the Olifantsfontein Railway Station was opened in 1892, it was also treated as a station serving Midrand.

== Transport ==
=== Road ===
The R562 road (Winnie Madikizela-Mandela Road; formerly Olifantsfontein Road), which forms the boundary between Clayville and Thembisa, connects both towns to Midrand in the west.

The main north–south route through Clayville is the M18 route, which connects the Clayville CBD with Irene and Centurion in the north and with the Thembisa CBD in the south.

Clayville is bypassed to the east by two main routes, namely the M57 route and the R21 highway. Both roads connect Clayville with Kempton Park in the south and with Pretoria in the north.

=== Rail ===
Olifantsfontein has a station on the main Metrorail Route between Pretoria in the north and Johannesburg (via Kempton Park & Germiston) in the south. It was opened in 1892.
