= Xolani Khumalo =

South African television presenter and politician

Xolani Khumalo (born 16 May 1990) is a South African television presenter, media personality, and politician. He is best known as the host of the crime-focused television programme Sizok’thola and for his political affiliation with ActionSA, where he has served as the party's mayoral candidate for the City of Ekurhuleni Metropolitan Municipality.

== Early life and education ==
Xolani was born on 16 May 1990 in Johannesburg, South Africa, and grew up in Tembisa.

== Media career ==
Khumalo rose to national prominence as the presenter of Sizok’thola, a television programme that focused on community-based anti-drug initiatives and exposing criminal activity. The show attracted significant public attention for its confrontational approach and its close engagement with communities affected by drug abuse and crime.

== Legal issues ==
In July 2023, Khumalo and members of the Sizok’thola production team were arrested and charged with murder, robbery, and malicious damage to property following the death of Robert Varrie, an alleged drug dealer, during the filming of an episode in Katlehong, Gauteng. Varrie later died after being taken to hospital, prompting the South African Police Service to open a murder investigation.

Khumalo handed himself over to police and was released on bail. In April 2025, the National Prosecuting Authority provisionally withdrew the charges to allow for further investigation.

On 19 January 2026, Khumalo voluntarily surrendered to police in relation to separate assault allegations linked to a 2025 incident. ActionSA confirmed that he would cooperate with law enforcement.

== Political career ==
In October 2025, ActionSA announced Khumalo as its mayoral candidate for Ekurhuleni ahead of the 2026 local government elections. Party leader Herman Mashaba cited Khumalo's public profile and focus on crime as factors in his selection.

== Public image ==
Khumalo's public image has been shaped by both his high-profile media work and his legal controversies. Supporters describe him as a community-focused crime activist, while critics have raised concerns about the methods used on Sizok’thola and the implications of his legal cases. Independent media coverage has highlighted the polarizing nature of his career.

== See also ==
- ActionSA
- Politics of South Africa
