= M41 (Johannesburg) =

Metropolitan route in Greater Johannesburg, South Africa

Metropolitan route M41

Route information
- Maintained by Johannesburg Roads Agency and Gauteng Department of Roads and Transport
- Length: 7.5 km (4.7 mi)

Major junctions
- North end: M57 in Jet Park

- R21 in Jet Park: N12 near Bartlett; M44 in Jansen Park
- South end: R21 in Boksburg North

Location
- Country: South Africa

Highway system
- Numbered routes of South Africa
| ← M40 | → M43 |

The M41 is a short metropolitan route in Boksburg, South Africa. It is a very short route connecting Jet Park with Boksburg North.

== Route ==
The M41 begins in Jet Park, in the far northern part of Boksburg (south of Kempton Park), at a T-junction with the M57 road (Pretoria Road). It begins by going eastwards to cross the R21 highway and reach a T-junction with Jones Road south of O. R. Tambo International Airport, near the South African Airways headquarters.

The M41 becomes Jones Road southwards to enter the Bartlett suburb of Boksburg. In Bartlett, it turns east, then south as Taijaard Road, then east as Yaldwyn Road, then south as Rondebult Road, to cross the N12 highway. It then reaches a junction with the M44 road (North Rand Road) and bypasses East Rand Mall to the east. It ends shortly thereafter at another junction with the R21 road (Rietfontein Road) in the suburb of Boksburg North.
