= Brakpan =

- Town
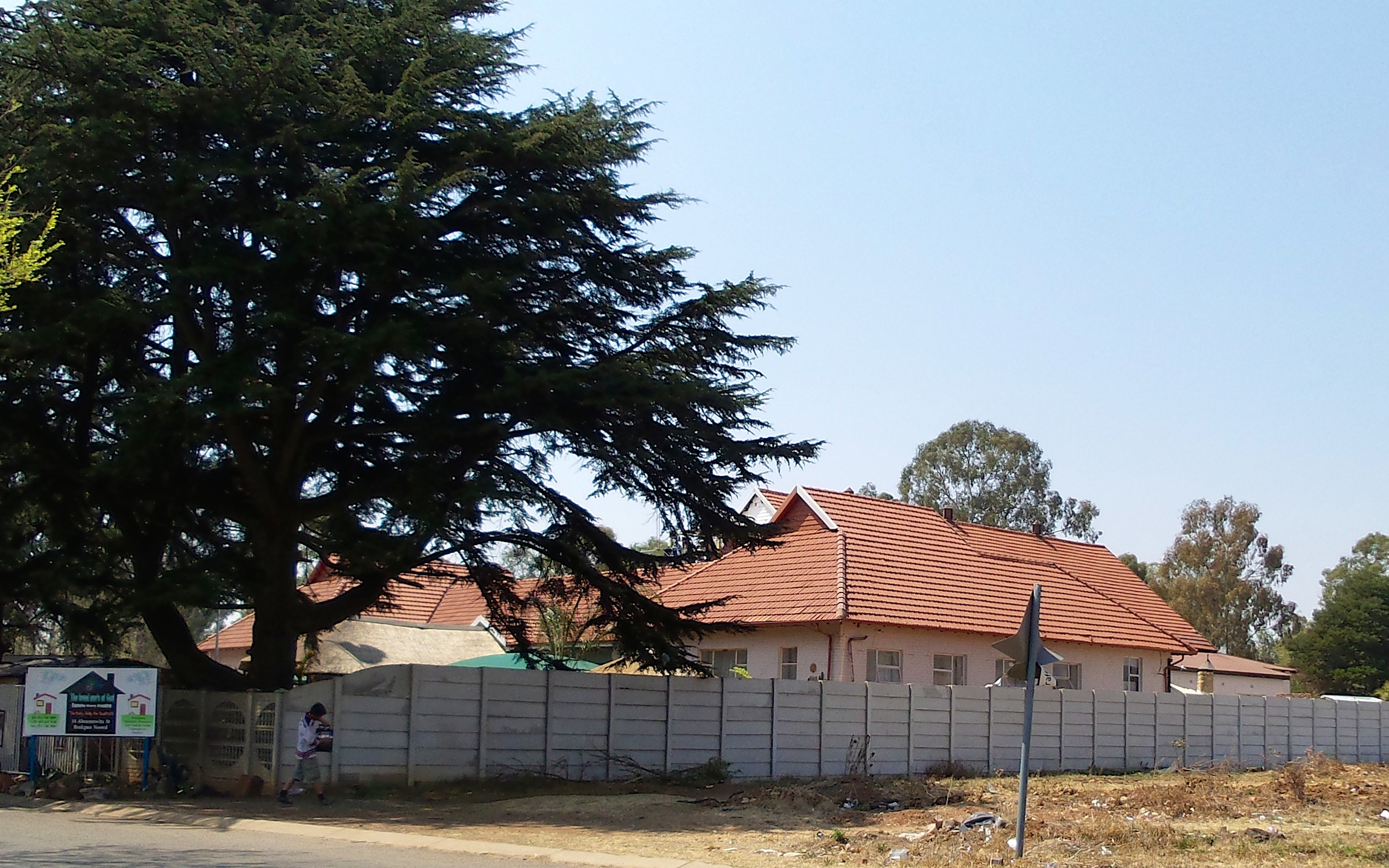
- Pentecost Protestant Church, Abramowitz Street, Brakpan

- Location within Gauteng Location within South Africa Location within Africa
- Coordinates: 26°14′07″S 28°22′12″E
- Country: South Africa
- Province: Gauteng
- Municipality: Ekurhuleni

Area
  - Total: 182.81 km^{2} (70.58 sq mi)
- Elevation: 1,631 m (5,351 ft)

Population (2011)
  - Total: 73,080
  - Density: 399.8/km^{2} (1,035/sq mi)

Racial makeup (2011)
  - Black African: 39.7%
  - Coloured: 2.5%
  - Indian/Asian: 4.1%
  - White: 53.3%
  - Other: 0.4%

First languages (2011)
  - Afrikaans: 47.2%
  - English: 16.5%
  - Zulu: 14.3%
  - Sotho: 4.8%
  - Other: 17.2%
- Time zone: UTC+2 (SAST)
- Postal code (street): 1540
- PO box: 1540
- Area code: 011
- Website: http://www.brakpan-online.co.za/

Brakpan is a historic and dynamic town on the East Rand of Gauteng, South Africa, approximately 38 kilometres (23.6 mi) east of Johannesburg. Established on a bedrock of mining history, Brakpan has evolved into a community celebrated for its residents and ideal geographic position. It merges the calmness of suburban life with the convenience of a metropolitan location, making it an attractive residential hub in the province.

While the town's roots are firmly planted in its mining past—a heritage that defines much of the architecture and character of the area—today, Brakpan acts as a central node on the East Rand, offering easy access to major commercial centres and transport links.

== History ==
The name Brakpan comes from a small pan on a farm called Weltevreden, which was filled with very brackish water and was probably referred to as the "brakpan", and it was near this pan that the first settlement started. In 1888, a coal seam was discovered and a coal mine under the name of Brakpan Collieries was started. When a railway line was constructed from Germiston to Springs, Brakpan became one of the stations along the route.

With gold fever running high on the Witwatersrand in the early years of the twentieth century, it was not long before gold was discovered. In 1905, Brakpan Mines Company sunk its first two gold mining shafts. One of its claims to fame was that it had the highest mine dump in the world at that time, 120 metres (390 ft) above ground level. This was higher than any of the pyramids of Egypt except the Pyramid of Cheops.

From 1905 the village grew rapidly, remaining a suburb of Benoni until 1912 when it was granted the status of a municipality and proclaimed as a town. Brakpan's central position makes it a good distribution centre for industry, especially engineering works and foundries. In the late 1990s the municipality approved the construction of a huge casino and entertainment complex, Carnival City, which opened the town to tourists and provided much-needed jobs for the people.

The first activity which drew people to the area was the British coal mining in 1888 and the large coal powered power station also built by the British. A tram line to Johannesburg was built at this time to service the power station.

The Main Reef Road (today part of the R29) linked Brakpan to all the other mining towns in the Witwatersrand. Brakpan was a suburb of Benoni from 1914–1919, when it was granted municipal status. The Brakpan miners were involved in the miners' strike of 1922. The town has gradually lost its importance as a gold mining area as the surrounding mines suffered from low yield over high cost. Many British residents emigrated during the apartheid era leaving a vacuum in the town which was filled by mostly Afrikaner farmers who had lost interest in farming.

Situated between Springs and Benoni, it forms part of the Ekurhuleni Metropolitan Municipality.

== Road/Infrastructure ==
Brakpan is mainly located along the N17 highway leading eastwards from Boksburg and Johannesburg to Springs and Secunda (102 km). In passing through Brakpan, the N17 gives access to the town via the exits at Heidelberg Road, Denne Road and Ergo Road.

Running parallel to the N17, the R554 (Elsburg Road; Springs Road) leads south-westwards to Alberton – 34 km and eastwards to Springs. The R23 (Heidelberg Road) skirts Brakpan to the west, leading northwards to Benoni and southwards to Heidelberg – 35 km.

The M45 leads north-westwards to Benoni and southwards to KwaThema. The M46 leads westwards from Brakpan to Boksburg and eastwards to Springs. In passing through Brakpan, the M46 holds several names such as Airport Road, Athlone Avenue, Voortrekker Road, Prince George Avenue and Olympia Road. Voortrekker Road is the main street through the Brakpan CBD.

== Healthcare ==
Healthcare services are readily available to Brakpan residents, ensuring easy access to quality medical care. The area is well-served by several hospitals and numerous medical centres. Life Dalview Private Hospital offers comprehensive private medical treatments, while the nearby Pholosong Hospital (formerly Far East Rand Hospital) provides extensive public healthcare services to the wider community. These key institutions, both of which provide urgent care, alongside various local clinics, guarantee that residents have rapid access to a full spectrum of medical amenities in and around the town.

== Education ==
Brakpan offers residents access to a selection of quality educational institutions that cater to various age groups and academic needs. Prominent local schools include the private facility Curro Helderwyk, along with public institutions like Brakpan High School, Dalpark Learning Academy, and Kenleaf Primary School. These schools are known for providing supportive learning environments, delivering excellent academic results, and offering diverse educational programs. The availability of strong public and private sector schooling options, complemented by a variety of extracurricular activities, makes Brakpan an appealing area for families with children.

== Location and Connectivity ==
Brakpan boasts a strategic location that offers excellent connectivity to the greater Gauteng province and beyond.The town is situated approximately 40 kilometres from the Johannesburg Central Business District (CBD), allowing residents easy access to the region's major business amenities, cultural attractions, and entertainment venues.

Furthermore, Brakpan is highly convenient for travel, lying just 25 kilometres from O.R. Tambo International Airport. This close proximity ensures that both domestic and international air travel is readily accessible to all inhabitants. This central positioning allows residents to enjoy the tranquillity of suburban life without sacrificing the metropolitan convenience of Johannesburg.

== Leisure and Attractions ==
Brakpan and its immediate surroundings offer a variety of scenic locations, cultural venues, and entertainment options. For culture and community events, the nearby Springs Civic Theatre hosts performances by local artists and serves as a major venue for regional functions. Outdoor enthusiasts can enjoy recreational activities at Brakpan Lake, which is popular for fishing and picnicking, or utilise the Brakpan Sports Grounds for various sports and games.

The town is also a hub for history and entertainment. Residents can delve into local heritage at institutions like the Brakpan Museum and the Jan Smuts House Museum, which chronicle the town's evolution. For entertainment, the major Carnival City Casino and Entertainment World complex is a primary attraction, featuring the Carnival City Gardens hotel. Excellent retail therapy is available at large centres such as Carnival Mall (or simply Mall@Carnival)
