= Thembisa =

Thembisa Tembisa
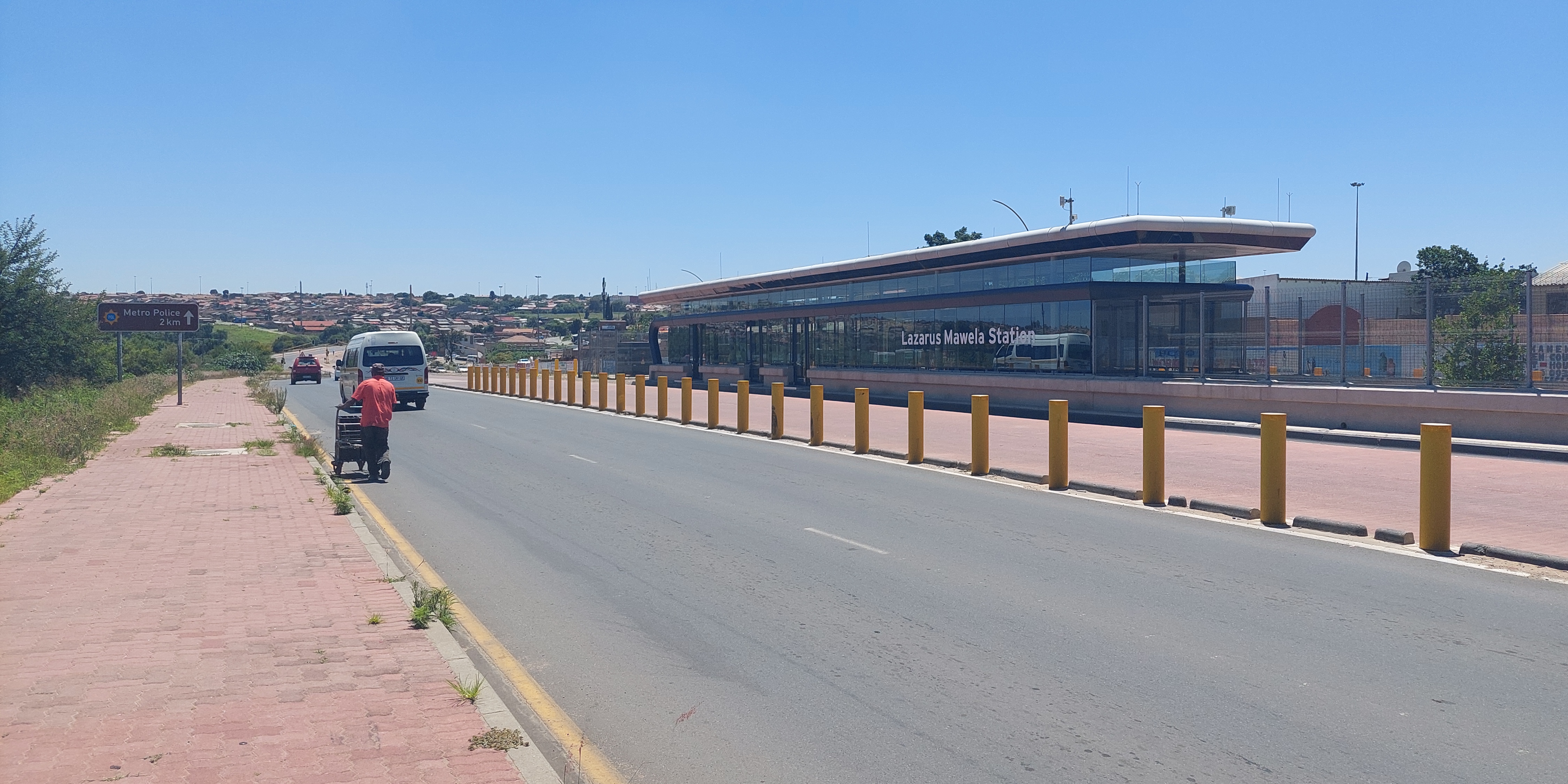
- Lazarus Mawela Station in Thembisa township

- Location within Gauteng Location within South Africa Location within Africa
- Coordinates: 26.0055°S 28.2102°E
- Country: South Africa
- Province: Gauteng
- Municipality: Ekurhuleni
- Established: 1957
  - Councillor: (ANC)

Area
  - Total: 42.80 km^{2} (16.53 sq mi)

Population (2011)
  - Total: 463,109
  - Density: 10,820/km^{2} (28,020/sq mi)

Racial makeup (2011)
  - Black African: 98.9%
  - Coloured: 0.2%
  - Indian/Asian: 0.1%
  - White: 0.1%
  - Other: 0.7%

First languages (2011)
  - Northern Sotho: 33.1%
  - Zulu: 21.7%
  - Tsonga: 13.3%
  - Xhosa: 7.0%
  - Other: 24.9%
- Time zone: UTC+2 (SAST)
- Postal code (street): 1632
- PO box: 1628
- Area code: 011

Thembisa, formerly Tembisa, is a large township situated to the north of Kempton Park on the East Rand, Gauteng, South Africa. It was established in 1957 when black people were resettled from Alexandra and other areas in Edenvale, Kempton Park, Midrand and Germiston.

== History ==
The township was formed in 1957, under the administration of the Germiston city council which oversaw the forced relocation of black people from locations deemed to be in white areas, such as Dindela, Tikkieline, Phelindaba, and Modderfontein which spanned Edenvale, Modderfontein and Kempton Park. It is the second largest township in Gauteng, following Soweto.

In 1977 the government initiated the Community Councils and in 1982 upgraded them to Town Councils, under the Black Local Authorities Act. The government vested limited powers on these councils but without financial muscle. Therefore, to raise revenue for purposes of developing the townships, the councils increased rent and service charges. This caused the residents in different townships, including Thembisa, to establish civic structures to resist the rent and service charge increases.

On 26 July 2016, residents were caught off guard when a tornado hit the area. The twister started in Kempton Park and moved over to Thembisa. Around 20 individuals were seriously injured, and more than 400 were left destitute. A standout amongst the most noticeable sights was the damage caused to the Phumulani Mall, where the rooftop crumbled after the tornado passed through it.

In early 2020, the township was renamed from "Tembisa" to "Thembisa", although the Minister of Arts had approved the rename earlier in 2016.

== Transport ==
=== Road ===
Thembisa is connected to Pretoria in the north and Kempton Park in the south via two main roads, namely the M57 metropolitan route and the R21 highway, both bypassing Thembisa to the east.

The northern part of Thembisa is connected to Midrand in the west by the R562 route (Winnie Madikizela-Mandela Road). The R562 forms the boundary between Thembisa and Olifantsfontein (Clayville).

The main route through the Thembisa town centre is the M18 route, which is formed by two roads (Andrew Mapheto Drive and Reverend RTJ Namane Drive). It connects Thembisa with Olifantsfontein and Centurion in the north and with Chloorkop (near Kempton Park West) in the south-west.

=== Rail ===
The main Metrorail route between Pretoria in the north and Johannesburg via Germiston in the south has a station in Thembisa east, namely the Oakmoor station. Just south of the Oakmoor station is a branch rail which heads north-west into the township, with the stations on the branch rail being Thembisa in the east, Limindlela in the center and Leralla in the west.

== Notable people ==
- Aymos - singer, songwriter
- Lerato Chabangu - soccer player
- Kane Keid - rapper, songwriter
- Xolani Khumalo - TV presenter
- Panyaza Lesufi - Premier of Gauteng
- Tsietsi Mahoa -soccer player
- George Maluleka - soccer player
- Xolani Maphanga - TV presenter
- Patrick Maswanganyi - soccer player
- Thabo Matlaba - soccer player
- Pearl Modiadie - TV presenter, radio DJ, producer
- Moses Taiwa Molelekwa - pianist
- Rosemary Ndlovu - serial killer
- Refiloe Nt'sekhe - Deputy Federal Chairperson of the Democratic Alliance (South Africa) (DA)
- Jerry Sikhosana - former soccer player, most famously for Orlando Pirates F.C., coach
- Tyler ICU, DJ and record producer
- Mthokozisi Yende - soccer player
- Lady Zamar - singer, songwriter
- Themba Zwane - soccer player
