= Bredell, Kempton Park =

Bredell
- Location within Gauteng Location within South Africa
- Coordinates: 26.0875°S 28.3050°E
- Country: South Africa
- Province: Gauteng
- Municipality: Ekurhuleni
- Main Place: Kempton Park

Area
  - Total: 12.39 km^{2} (4.78 sq mi)

Population (2011)
  - Total: 4,384
  - Density: 353.8/km^{2} (916.4/sq mi)

Racial makeup (2011)
  - White: 60.83%
  - Black African: 34.95%
  - Coloured: 1.67%
  - Indian/Asian: 0.59%
  - Other: 1.96%

First languages (2011)
  - Afrikaans: 45.77%
  - English: 22.75%
  - Other: 7.07%
  - Northern Sotho: 6.21%
  - Zulu: 4.47%
- Time zone: UTC+2 (SAST)

Bredell is one of the easternmost suburbs of Kempton Park, in Gauteng province, South Africa. It was the site of the Bredell land occupation in 2001.
