= Pomona, Kempton Park =

Pomona
- Location within Gauteng Location within South Africa
- Coordinates: 26.087438°S 28.271795°E
- Country: South Africa
- Province: Gauteng
- Municipality: Ekurhuleni
- Main Place: Kempton Park

Area
  - Total: 11.01 km^{2} (4.25 sq mi)

Population (2011)
  - Total: 6,677
  - Density: 606.4/km^{2} (1,571/sq mi)

Racial makeup (2011)
  - Black African: 33.7%
  - Coloured: 1.9%
  - Indian/Asian: 3.1%
  - White: 60.5%
  - Other: 0.7%

First languages (2011)
  - Afrikaans: 41.4%
  - English: 28.4%
  - Zulu: 3.2%
  - N/S Sotho: 11.0%
  - Other: 16%
- Time zone: UTC+2 (SAST)
- Postal code (street): 1619
- PO box: --

Pomona is a northerly suburb of Kempton Park, in Gauteng province, South Africa.

In the late 20th century Pomona functioned mainly as agricultural small holdings, producing fresh vegetables and fruit.

Since 2015, the area is reportedly rapidly becoming an industrial area with the presence of large warehouses of various international forwarding companies, because of its proximity of 5 km to OR Tambo International Airport on the R21 freeway and the suburb's distance from other residential suburbs of Kempton Park.
