= Bapsfontein =

- Location within Gauteng Location within South Africa Location within Africa
- Coordinates: 26°0′0″S 28°26′0″E
- Country: South Africa
- Province: Gauteng
- Municipality: Ekurhuleni

Area
  - Total: 4.28 km^{2} (1.65 sq mi)

Population (2011)
  - Total: 707
  - Density: 165/km^{2} (428/sq mi)

Racial makeup (2011)
  - Black African: 38.5%
  - Coloured: 1.6%
  - Indian/Asian: 0.4%
  - White: 59.3%
  - Other: 0.3%

First languages (2011)
  - Afrikaans: 43.7%
  - English: 17.4%
  - Zulu: 10.9%
  - Northern Sotho: 6.1%
  - Other: 21.9%
- Time zone: UTC+2 (SAST)
- Postal code (street): 1510
- PO box: 1510

Bapsfontein is a farming town in Ekurhuleni, South Africa, and falls into the Elandsvlei Conservancy area. It is situated at the intersection of the R25 and R50 roads. The area is known for its variety of birds as it is directly on the International Bird Route. The surrounding areas are made up of pristine grasslands and many pans are found in the area. Wetlands are protected in this area. Bapsfontein forms part of the catchment area for many essential rivers and dams.

Bapsfontein is approximately 16 km (10 mi) east-north-east of Kempton Park and approximately 25 km (16 mi) north-north-east of Benoni. It is zoned as an agricultural area, with a small peri-urban town. Nest Park falls within the Bapsfontein border. Nest Park is made up of approx 255 small farms and is a small village with friendly residents. Village life is although very peaceful also very active and there are annual potjiekos competitions, garden walks and other community events on the go during the year.

During the first half of 2004 various sinkholes appeared, as a result of too much groundwater being pumped out by vegetable farmers in the area.

Found in the area are approximated 19 sinkholes. The soil is dolomitic and high in lime, which makes it very fertile for crop farming. There are many horse owners in the area and there are many outrides and trails to explore.
