= R554 (South Africa) =

Regional Route in South Gauteng, South Africa

Regional route R554

Route information
- Maintained by GDRT
- Length: 67.6 km (42.0 mi)

Major junctions
- West end: M68 Abu Baker Asvat Drive, Protea South, Soweto
- N12 in Protea South, Soweto; R553 in Lenasia East; R82 / R550 near Kibler Park, Johannesburg South; R59 in Alberton; R103 in Alberton; N3 in Alberton; R103 in Roodekop, Germiston; R21 near Dawn Park, Boksburg; R23 near Dalpark, Brakpan
- East end: R51 Springs West Road, Springs

Location
- Country: South Africa
- Major cities: Springs, Brakpan, Alberton, Lenasia

Highway system
- Numbered routes of South Africa
← R553	→ R555

The R554 is a Regional Route in Gauteng, South Africa. The road connects the southern suburbs of Soweto with Springs on the East Rand via Lenasia, Alberton and Brakpan.

== Route ==
Its western terminus is an interchange with the M68 and the N12 Moroka Bypass, just south of Soweto (south of Protea Glen), as Abu Baker Asvat Drive. The route runs south to Lenasia and then turns east in the town centre. It intersects with the R553 and passes over the N1 adjacent to the Olifantsvlei Nature Reserve east of Lenasia. At a four-way intersection in Johannesburg South (north of Walkerville), the eastbound road becomes the R550. The R554 is then cosigned with the intersecting R82 for 800 metres northwards, crossing the Klip River, before the R554 becomes its own road eastwards.

The R554 heads east-north-east as Swartkoppies Road through Kibler Park, Mayfield Park and Patlynn to enter Alberton. In Alberton, it passes over the R59 Sybrand van Niekerk Freeway and reaches a junction with the R103 and the M31 south of Alberton CBD. It becomes co-signed with the R103, heading east-south-east as Heidelberg Road, meeting the N3 at an interchange just before Roodekop, where it changes its street name to the Nederveen Highway.

At Roodekop, the R554 splits from the R103 and proceeds eastwards. It passes through the southern part of Germiston and Boksburg, where it meets the R21 south of Sunward Park. It proceeds to meet the R23 at Carnival City before passing under the N17. It then goes through the southern part of Brakpan and then to Springs, where it reaches its eastern terminus at a junction with the R51 in the suburb of Wright Park (just south-west of the town centre).
