= Balfour, Mpumalanga =

Balfour
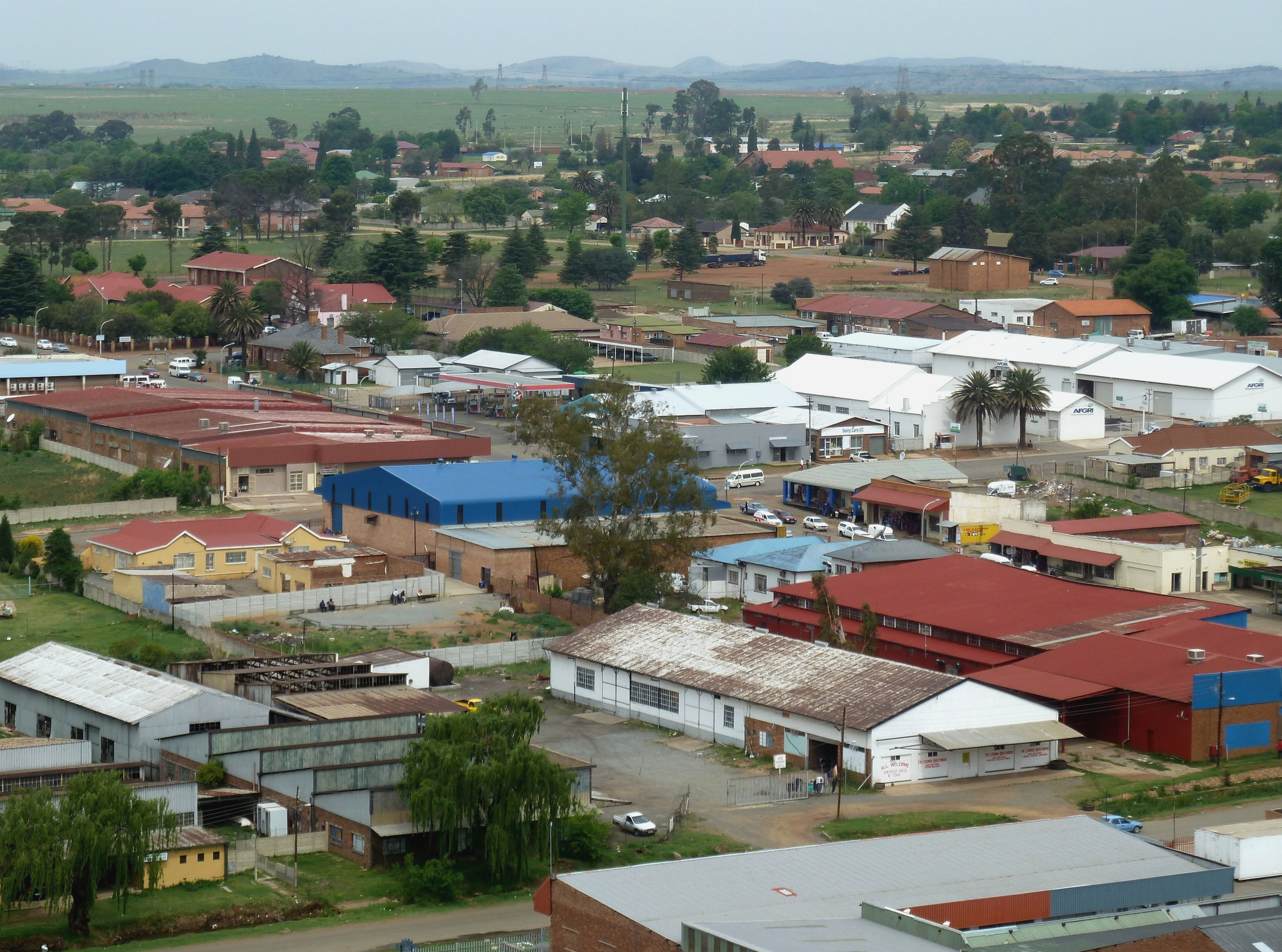
- Skyline photo of central Balfour

- Location within Mpumalanga Location within South Africa
- Coordinates: 26°39′S 28°35′E
- Country: South Africa
- Province: Mpumalanga
- District: Gert Sibande
- Municipality: Dipaleseng

Area
  - Total: 12.06 km^{2} (4.66 sq mi)

Population (2011)
  - Total: 3,201
  - Density: 265.4/km^{2} (687.4/sq mi)

Racial makeup (2011)
  - Black African: 50.2%
  - Coloured: 1.4%
  - Indian/Asian: 9.4%
  - White: 38.4%
  - Other: 0.6%

First languages (2011)
  - Afrikaans: 5.6%
  - Zulu: 60.7%
  - English: 15.4%
  - Sotho: 12.6%
  - Other: 10.7%
- Time zone: UTC+2 (SAST)
- Postal code (street): 2410
- PO box: 2410
- Area code: +27 17 773

Balfour is a developing gold mining and maize farming town in Mpumalanga, South Africa.

R160 Million Fine for Dipaleseng Local Municipality for Misconduct Spanning Five Years

Balfour – The Deputy Minister of Water and Sanitation, Sello Seitlholo, has commended the Balfour Magistrate’s Court for imposing a R160 million fine on the Dipaleseng Local Municipality. The municipality, based in Mpumalanga, was penalised for severe contraventions of environmental laws that harmed water resources, livestock, and community livelihoods.

The ruling, delivered on 15 November, found the municipality guilty under multiple statutes, including the National Environmental Management Act (NEMA) 107 of 1998 and the National Water Act 36 of 1998. Violations included pollution of water sources, failure to comply with remedial directives, and unauthorised disposal of wastewater.

Between December 2018 and August 2023, the municipality reportedly engaged in activities that devastated local ecosystems and communities. Evidence revealed the disposal of untreated sewage, including raw sludge laden with high levels of fecal coliform and E. coli, into water sources such as the Suikerbostant River and Gasteplaas Dam. Affected areas included Balfour Town, Kanini Township, Greylingstad, Grootvlei, Nthoarane, and Siyathemba Township.

Residents endured contaminated drinking water and ongoing sewer spills, with the mismanagement of the Balfour Wastewater Treatment Works exacerbating the crisis. Complaints from affected communities about polluted water, livestock deaths, and deteriorating living conditions spurred investigations by the Departments of Water and Sanitation, and Agriculture, Rural Development, Land, and Environmental Affairs.

Deputy Minister Seitlholo hailed the court’s decision as a pivotal moment in holding municipalities accountable for environmental negligence.

“This court ruling is a significant milestone in our efforts to hold polluters accountable,” Seitlholo said. “The R160 million fine should serve as a wake-up call to other municipalities that fail to comply with environmental and water management regulations. We will not hesitate to take firm action against any entity that disregards its legal obligations.”

The court’s judgment also emphasised the municipality’s admission of guilt on all charges, underscoring the gravity of the violations. “Municipalities must implement corrective measures to prevent further harm to our environment and communities,” Seitlholo added.

Of the R160 million fine, R40 million is suspended for five years, provided the municipality refrains from committing similar offenses during the suspension period. This condition aims to encourage improved compliance and discourage future violations.

The Department of Water and Sanitation has reaffirmed its commitment to ensuring municipalities adhere to compliance notices and prioritise sustainable environmental practices. The judgment marks a critical step in protecting South Africa’s natural resources and the well-being of its citizens.

“Enforcing environmental laws is not just about penalties; it is about safeguarding the lives and livelihoods of our communities,” Seitlholo concluded.

Residents of the affected areas, who have long endured the consequences of the municipality’s negligence, have welcomed the court’s decision, expressing hope that the ruling will bring much-needed accountability and change. Photo: Stock image.

== History ==
The town and post office, some 80 kilometres (50 mi) southeast of Johannesburg, was established on the farms Vlakfontein No. 101 and No. 108 which belonged to Frederick Stuart McHattie, and named McHattiesburg after him in 1897. Proclaimed on 16 February 1898, it was renamed Balfour on 15 February 1905, after Arthur James Balfour, Prime Minister of Great Britain, 1902–1905, who visited South Africa in that year.
