= Cresslawn =

- Location within Gauteng Location within South Africa
- Coordinates: 26°6′42″S 28°12′16″E
- Country: South Africa
- Province: Gauteng
- Municipality: Ekurhuleni
- Main Place: Kempton Park

Area
  - Total: 0.92 km^{2} (0.36 sq mi)

Population (2011)
  - Total: 2,308
  - Density: 2,500/km^{2} (6,500/sq mi)

Racial makeup (2011)
  - Black African: 53.2%
  - Coloured: 4.2%
  - Indian/Asian: 4.2%
  - White: 37.6%
  - Other: 0.8%

First languages (2011)
  - Afrikaans: 29.0%
  - English: 26.9%
  - Zulu: 10.6%
  - Northern Sotho: 6.6%
  - Other: 26.8%
- Time zone: UTC+2 (SAST)
- Postal code (street): 1619
- Area code: 010

Cresslawn is a suburb of Kempton Park, in Gauteng province, South Africa.
