= Benoni, South Africa =

Benoni
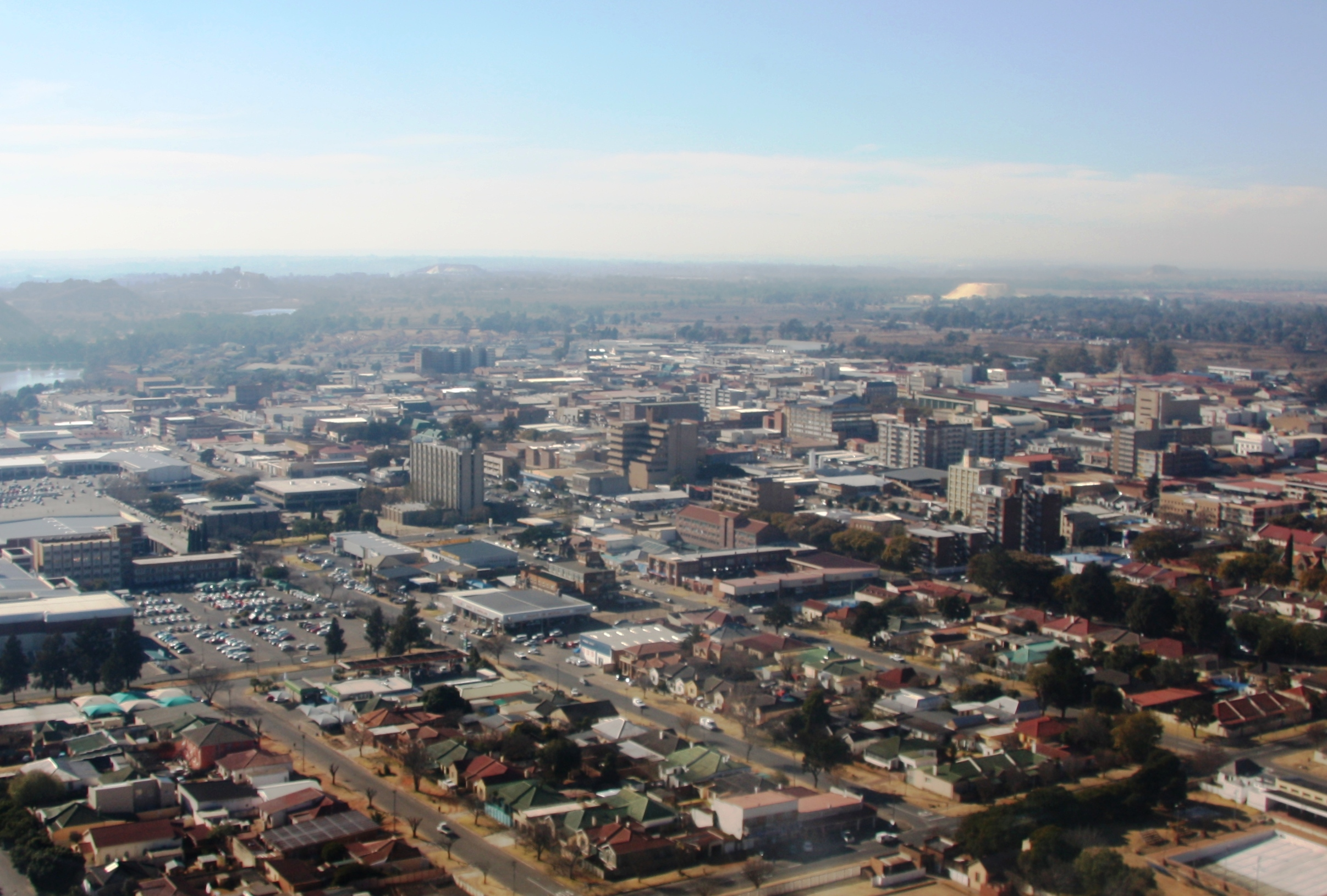
- The CBD of Benoni

- Location within Gauteng Location within South Africa Location within Africa
- Coordinates: 26°11′18″S 28°19′14″E
- Country: South Africa
- Province: Gauteng
- Municipality: Ekurhuleni
- Established: 1881

Area
  - Total: 175.55 km^{2} (67.78 sq mi)
- Elevation: 1,645 m (5,397 ft)

Population (2011)
  - Total: 158,777
  - Density: 904.45/km^{2} (2,342.5/sq mi)

Racial makeup (2011)
  - Black African: 45.2%
  - Coloured: 2.1%
  - Indian/Asian: 13.9%
  - White: 38.1%
  - Other: 0.8%

First languages (2011)
  - English: 53.89%
  - Afrikaans: 11%
  - Zulu: 17.1%
  - Northern Sotho: 5.3%
  - Other: 17.3%
- Time zone: UTC+2 (SAST)
- Postal code (street): 1501
- PO box: 1500
- Area code: 011

Benoni is a town on the East Rand, Gauteng, South Africa, some 26 kilometres (16 mi) east of Johannesburg, within the City of Ekurhuleni municipality.

Benoni was also the setting for the MTV-inspired movie Crazy Monkey: Straight Outta Benoni, released internationally in 2005.

== Geography ==
Benoni is situated towards the centre of the East Rand and lies on the urban fringe where the urban area dissolves into the smallholdings and farmland to the north. It borders on Kempton Park to the north-west, Boksburg to the west, Brakpan to the south and Daveyton to the east.

Benoni mainly encompasses a mixture of suburban areas and semi-rural acreage towards the north while the commercial central business district lies in the centre and a few industrial areas lie towards the south.

== Transportation ==
=== Rail ===
Benoni lies on the main railway line between Johannesburg and Springs and the main railway line between Johannesburg and Daveyton, both operated by Metrorail which has temporarily suspended services on these commuter lines since 2020 and have remained closed due to vandalism on these lines.

Prior to 2020, Metrorail operated services on the Johannesburg-Springs line from Benoni to Johannesburg, Germiston, Boksburg, Brakpan and Springs. Benoni is served by three Metrorail railway stations on the Johannesburg-Springs line including: Benoni station, New Kleinfontein station and Apex station.

Prior to 2020, Metrorail operated services on the Johannesburg-Daveyton line from Benoni to Johannesburg, Germiston and Boksburg. Benoni is served by three Metrorail railway stations on the Johannesburg-Daveyton line including: Avenue station, Northmead station and Van Ryn station.

=== Road ===
The N12 is the major freeway that runs through Benoni. It enters the town from Boksburg and Johannesburg in the west, bisecting the town and bypassing the CBD to its immediate north before heading east towards eMalahleni.

The R23 runs north-south from Kempton Park towards Brakpan and Heidelberg and runs through the CBD as Tom Jones Street (southbound) and Bunyan Street (northbound). The R29 runs east-west from Springs towards Boksburg and runs through the CBD as Ampthill Avenue (westbound) and Princess Avenue (eastbound). The R51 runs north-south from Bapsfontein, just outside Benoni towards Springs and barely by-passes Benoni to the east.

Benoni is also served by three metropolitan routes linking it to surrounding towns and cities in the East Rand. The M43 links Benoni with Kempton Park to the north-west and Vosloorus to the south-west. The M44 links Benoni with Boksburg to the west. The M45 links Benoni with Kempton Park to the north-west. The M53 links Benoni with Boksburg to the west and Brakpan to the south.

== People from Benoni ==
- Nomuzi Mabena, South African rapper
- Urzila Carlson, New Zealand based comedian
- R. Graham Cooks, chemist
- Charlene, Princess of Monaco (née Wittstock), swimmer, and consort of Prince Albert II of Monaco
- Bryan Habana, former Springboks rugby player
- Philip Holiday, IBF World Champion Boxer
- Morris Kahn, Israeli billionaire, founder and chairman of Aurec Group
- Denis Lindsay, cricketer
- Mildred Mangxola, singer and member of the Mahotella Queens
- Frith van der Merwe, schoolteacher at Benoni High and the most prolific female runner in the history of the Comrades Marathon
- Jessica Marais, actress
- Pops Mohamed, jazz musician
- Genevieve Morton, top model
- Grace Mugabe, former First Lady of Zimbabwe
- Bradley Player, cricketer
- Oliver Reginald Tambo, anti-apartheid politician
- Charlize Theron, Oscar-winning actress (Academy Awards: Best Actress Monster)
- Vic Toweel, former undisputed World bantamweight champion and South African boxing champion.
- Jill Trappler, visual artist
- Nibs van der Spuy, guitarist, singer, songwriter

== Arms ==
Coat of arms of Benoni, South Africa

Notes
Granted by the College of Arms, 6 March 1938.
Crest
In front of a sun rising Or an arm embowed the hand grasping a sledgehammer Proper.
Escutcheon
Or a turreted castle of three storeys Sable on a chief Sable three escallops Argent all within a bordure Gules charged with four bezants and four heraldic fountains alternately.
Supporters
Two springbok Proper each gorged with a collar Azure charged with three bezants.
Motto
Auspocium Melioris Aevi

== Jewish community ==
Benoni was previously home to a thriving Jewish community, peaking with 400+ Jewish families. Jewish residents were also widely involved in the greater community, with five Jewish mayors- with the most famous being Morris Nestadt.

The Benoni Shul congregation began with a synagogue located on Woburn Avenue in 1907, before relocating to a new, larger synagogue on Park Street in 1933. The synagogue served the community for 90 years, before closing in 2023. Rabbi Lionel Mirvis, father of Chief Rabbi, Ephraim Mirvis, previously served the congregation. The synagogue was designed in a modernist style by the English architect, Arthur Furner, a partner in Hermann Kallenbach's architectural firm, KKF.

The community was also served by Hillel, a Jewish day school, which closed in 1989, amid Jewish migration to Johannesburg's northern suburbs and emigration overseas.

A Jewish cemetery was also established in Benoni in 1912, it is administered by the Benoni Chevrah Kadisha.

Aura Herzog, the former First Lady of Israel, often spent shabbat in Benoni when she was a student in Johannesburg.
