= Suikerbosrand River =

Tributary of the Vaal River, South Africa

- Location within South Africa
- Etymology: Named after the Afrikaans word for the Protea flower, suikerbos (sugarbush)
- Native name: Suikerbosrandrivier (Afrikaans)

Location
- Country: South Africa
- Province: Gauteng

Physical characteristics
- Source: South of Leandra
  - location: Mpumalanga
  - coordinates: 26°25′03″S 28°51′50″E
- Mouth: Vaal River
  - coordinates: 26°40′13″S 27°58′37″E

The Suikerbosrand River (Afrikaans: Suikerbosrandrivier) is a tributary of the Vaal River that flows from Leandra in Mpumalanga, westwards through Gauteng to Vereeniging in South Africa. Its mouth is on the northern banks of the Vaal on the Gauteng / Free State border in Three Rivers.

== Ecology and water quality ==
The Suikerbosrand is impacted by the poor water quality of its main tributary, the Blesbokspruit; this is due to terrestrial runoff, point source pollution and mine water drainage.

== Tributaries ==
- Blesbokspruit
- Boesmanspruit
- Osspruit
