= Kempton Park West =

- Location within Gauteng Location within South Africa
- Coordinates: 26.0858°S 28.1869°E
- Country: South Africa
- Province: Gauteng
- Municipality: Ekurhuleni
- Main Place: Kempton Park

Area
  - Total: 0.92 km^{2} (0.36 sq mi)

Population (2011)
  - Total: 3,598
  - Density: 3,900/km^{2} (10,000/sq mi)

Racial makeup (2011)
  - Black African: 73.51%
  - White: 22.21%
  - Coloured: 2.33%
  - Indian/Asian: 1.45%
  - Other: 0.50%

First languages (2011)
  - Afrikaans: 21.62%
  - English: 18.40%
  - Zulu: 16.70%
  - Northern Sotho: 14.23%
  - Sotho: 6.48%
- Time zone: UTC+2 (SAST)

Kempton Park West is one of the westernmost suburbs of Kempton Park, in Gauteng province, South Africa.
