= Glen Marais =

- Location within Gauteng Location within South Africa
- Coordinates: 26.0742°S 28.2586°E
- Country: South Africa
- Province: Gauteng
- Municipality: Ekurhuleni
- Main Place: Kempton Park

Area
  - Total: 5.95 km^{2} (2.30 sq mi)

Population (2011)
  - Total: 13,569
  - Density: 2,280/km^{2} (5,910/sq mi)

Racial makeup (2011)
  - White: 76.0%
  - Black African: 18.6%
  - Indian/Asian: 2.9%
  - Coloured: 1.3%
  - Other: 1.2%

First languages (2011)
  - Afrikaans: 53.9%
  - English: 32.1%
  - Zulu: 2.7%
  - Northern Sotho: 2.2%
  - Other: 9.1%
- Time zone: UTC+2 (SAST)

Glen Marais is a suburb of Kempton Park, in Gauteng province, South Africa.
