= Esther Park, Kempton Park =

Esther Park
- Location within Gauteng Location within South Africa
- Coordinates: 26.100°S 28.190°E
- Country: South Africa
- Province: Gauteng
- Municipality: Ekurhuleni
- Main Place: Kempton Park

Area
  - Total: 5.28 km^{2} (2.04 sq mi)

Population (2011)
  - Total: 4,561
  - Density: 864/km^{2} (2,240/sq mi)

Racial makeup (2011)
  - Black African: 58.1%
  - Coloured: 4.1%
  - Indian/Asian: 6.2%
  - White: 31.3%
  - Other: 0.3%

First languages (2011)
  - English: 31.4%
  - Afrikaans: 23.2%
  - Zulu: 12.5%
  - Northern Sotho: 6.6%
  - Other: 26.3%
- Time zone: UTC+2 (SAST)

Esther Park, also spelt Estherpark, is a suburb of Kempton Park, in Gauteng province, South Africa. It is west of the city centre.
