= Birchleigh =

- Location within Gauteng Location within South Africa
- Coordinates: 26°3′25″S 28°14′16″E
- Country: South Africa
- Province: Gauteng
- Municipality: Ekurhuleni
- Main Place: Kempton Park

Area
  - Total: 4.46 km^{2} (1.72 sq mi)

Population (2011)
  - Total: 10,776
  - Density: 2,420/km^{2} (6,260/sq mi)

Racial makeup (2011)
  - Black African: 25.1%
  - Coloured: 1.6%
  - Indian/Asian: 2.4%
  - White: 70.0%
  - Other: 0.9%

First languages (2011)
  - Afrikaans: 59.3%
  - English: 21.5%
  - Zulu: 3.7%
  - Northern Sotho: 3.4%
  - Other: 12.1%
- Time zone: UTC+2 (SAST)
- Postal code (street): 1618
- PO box: 1621

Birchleigh is a northern suburb of Kempton Park, in Gauteng province, South Africa. The suburb has a population of 10,776 as of the 2011 census.
