= East Rand =

Eastern region of Gauteng, South Africa

Coordinates: 26°10′38″S 28°13′19″E

- Region
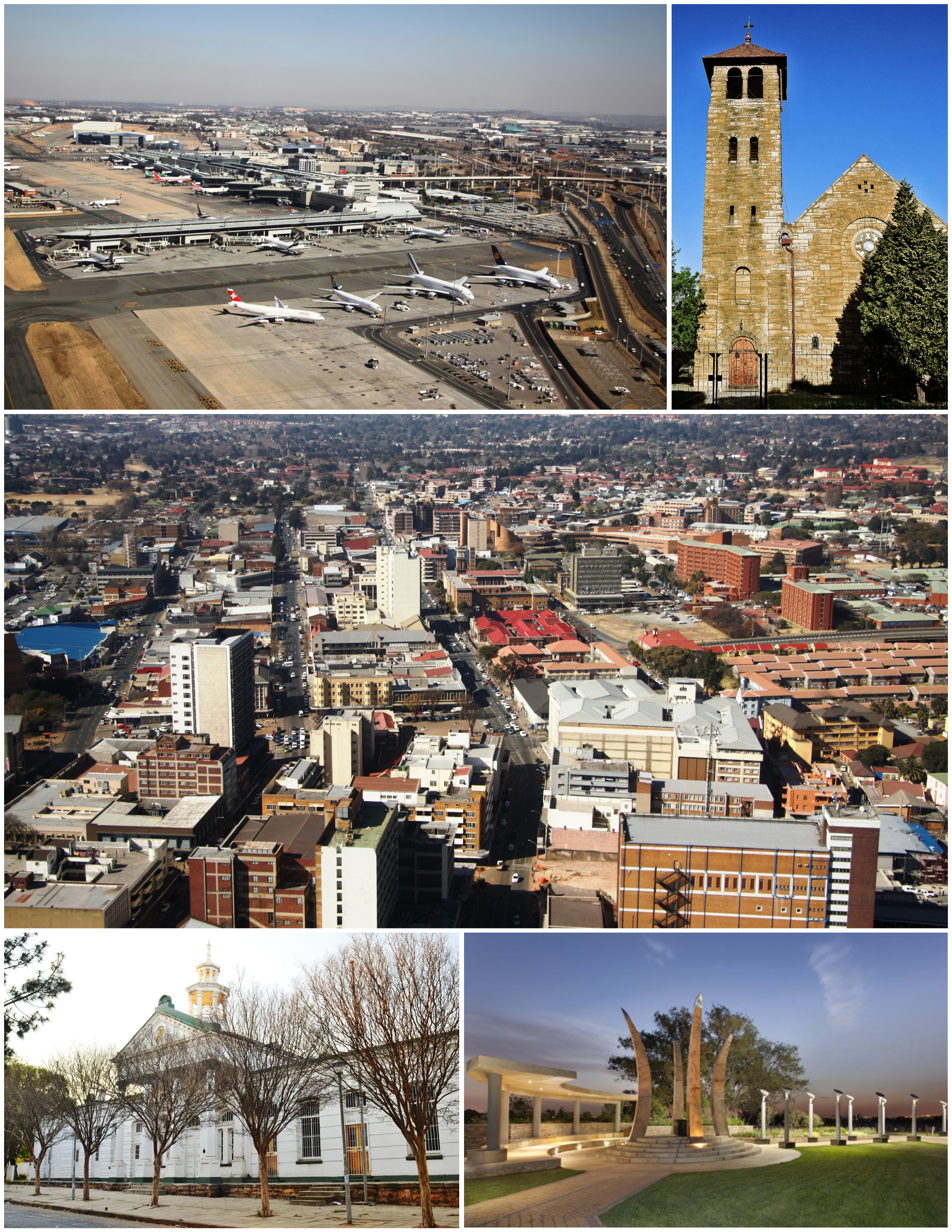
- From the top, left to right: O.R Tambo Int'l Airport, St Michael and All Angels Church, Germiston Central Business District, Old Boksburg Magistrates Office, Chris Hani Monument
- Interactive map of East Rand
- Country: South Africa
- Province: Gauteng
- Time zone: UTC+2 (SAST)

The East Rand is a major urban area located in the Gauteng province of South Africa. It is the urban eastern part of Witwatersrand that is functionally merged with the Johannesburg conurbation. The region extends from Alberton in the west to Springs in the east, and south down to Nigel. It includes the towns of Bedfordview, Benoni, Boksburg, Brakpan, Edenvale, Germiston, Kempton Park, Linksfield Modderfontein and Thembisa The East Rand is known as the transport hub of Johannesburg and includes Africa's largest and second busiest airport, OR Tambo International Airport.

After the end of apartheid, the municipal governments of the towns of the East Rand were combined (excluding Modderfontein and Linksfield), and eventually merged into a single administration: the City of Ekurhuleni Metropolitan Municipality.

== History ==
This area became settled by Europeans after a gold-bearing reef was discovered in 1886 and sparked the gold rush that gave rise to the establishment of Johannesburg. As part of the restructuring of municipalities in South Africa at the time, the local governments of the East Rand (excluding Modderfontein and Linksfield) were merged into a single municipality in 1999, called the City of Ekurhuleni Metropolitan Municipality (ekurhuleni meaning "place of peace" in Tsonga).

Despite having a separate municipal government, like the West Rand, the East Rand is included as part of the Witwatersrand urban area. To this end, the East Rand shares the same dialling code as Johannesburg (011 locally) and the same metropolitan route numbering system as Johannesburg (and the West Rand). It is not uncommon for residents of the East Rand to work in Johannesburg proper and vice versa.
