= Isando =

- Location within Gauteng Location within South Africa
- Coordinates: 26.144°S 28.207°E
- Country: South Africa
- Province: Gauteng
- Municipality: Ekurhuleni
- Main Place: Kempton Park
- Established: 1949

Area
  - Total: 6.21 km^{2} (2.40 sq mi)

Population (2011)
  - Total: 23
  - Density: 3.7/km^{2} (9.6/sq mi)

Racial makeup (2011)
  - Black African: 69.2%
  - White: 30.8%

First languages (2011)
  - Afrikaans: 45.5%
  - Zulu: 18.2%
  - Northern Sotho: 18.2%
  - English: 9.1%
  - Other: 9.1%
- Time zone: UTC+2 (SAST)
- Postal code (street): 1609
- PO box: 1600
- Area code: 010

Isando is a town in Ekurhuleni in the Gauteng province of South Africa.

== History ==
Industrial township south-west of Kempton Park, 22 km east of Johannesburg. It was laid out on the farm Witkoppie and proclaimed on 21 December 1949. The name is of Bantu origin and it is the Zulu name for a hammer.
