= Nigel, South Africa =

Nigel
- Location within Gauteng Location within South Africa
- Coordinates: 26°25′13″S 28°28′6″E
- Country: South Africa
- Province: Gauteng
- Municipality: Ekurhuleni

Area
  - Total: 139.07 km^{2} (53.70 sq mi)

Population (2011)
  - Total: 38,318
  - Density: 275.53/km^{2} (713.62/sq mi)

Racial makeup (2011)
  - Black African: 44.9%
  - Coloured: 16.7%
  - Indian/Asian: 3.9%
  - White: 33.4%
  - Other: 1.1%

First languages (2011)
  - Afrikaans: 43.5%
  - Zulu: 23.3%
  - English: 16.1%
  - Sotho: 5.3%
  - Other: 11.8%
- Time zone: UTC+2 (SAST)
- Postal code (street): 1491
- PO box: 1490
- Area code: 011

Nigel is a small gold mining town in Gauteng Province, South Africa, south-east of Johannesburg. The town is at the south-eastern edge of the City of Ekurhuleni Metropolitan Municipality and the East Rand.

== Background ==
A farmer, shopkeeper and prospector, Petrus Johannes Marais, having read Sir Walter Scott's The Fortunes of Nigel at the time (see Nigel), formed the Nigel Gold Mining Company after the discovery of gold on the farm Varkensfontein in 1886. The town, which grew around the mine, still bears names derived from Scott's book and its characters with the suburb of Glenvarloch and its streets derived from that source.

Today the town is focused primarily on mining and also has various heavy industries.

The town became known as the setting of the popular Afrikaans-sitcom Vetkoekpaleis, a sitcom that revolves around the daily lives of staff members of the Vetkoekpaleis (a Vetkoek-themed fast-food restaurant).

Nigel's municipal government became part of the much larger City of Ekurhuleni Metropolitan Municipality following the creation of new local government structures in 2000, along with most of rest of the East Rand.

On 1 August 2010, a fire at the Pieter Wessels old age home led to the deaths of 22 people.

Dennis Hardman, Olympic shooter for Zimbabwe, was born in Nigel in 1943.
