= Vosloorus =

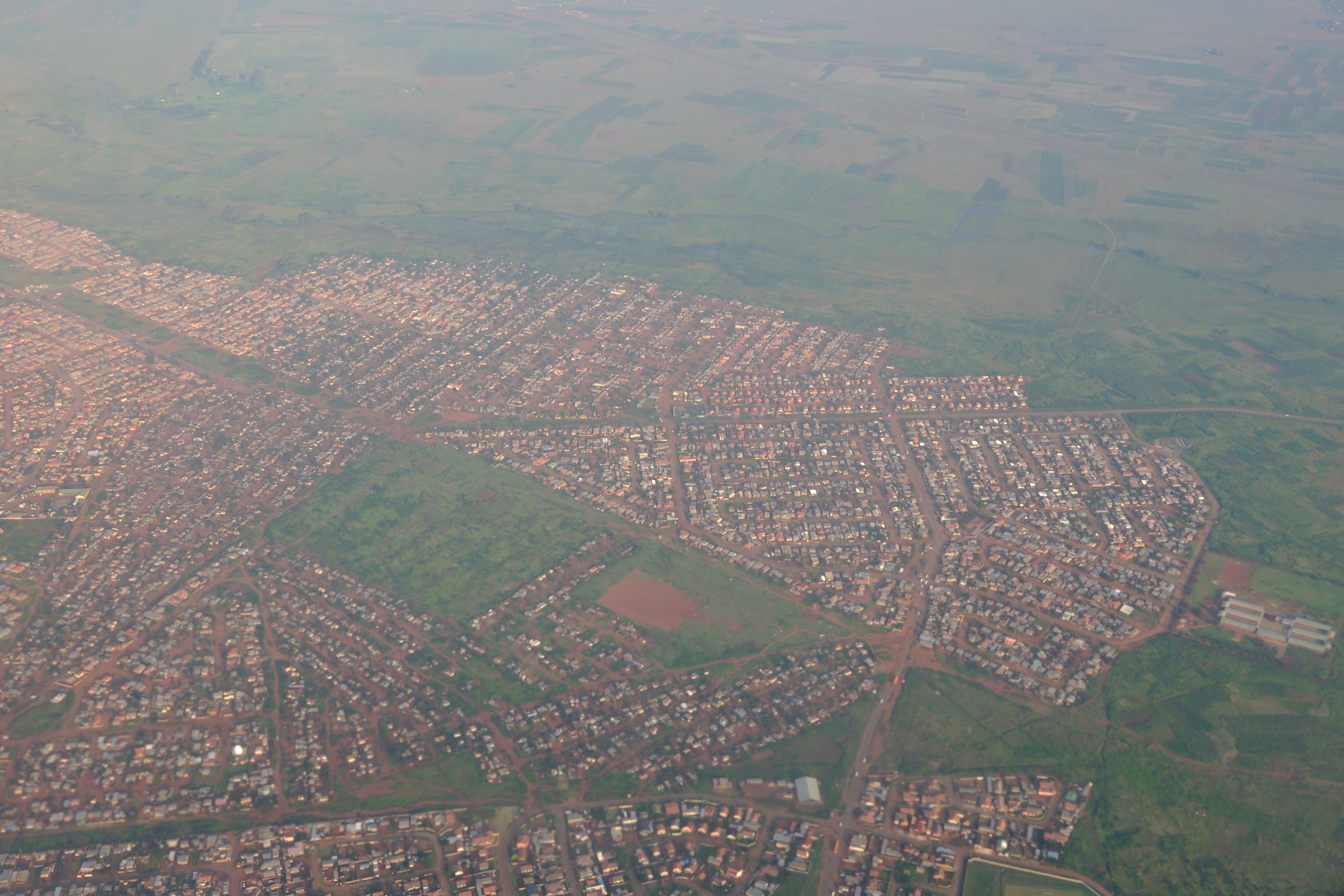
- Aerial view of Vosloorus

- Location within Gauteng Location within South Africa Location within Africa
- Coordinates: 26°21′30″S 28°12′27″E
- Country: South Africa
- Province: Gauteng
- Municipality: Ekurhuleni
- Main Place: Boksburg

Area
  - Total: 32.10 km^{2} (12.39 sq mi)

Population (2011)
  - Total: 163,216
  - Density: 5,085/km^{2} (13,170/sq mi)

Racial makeup (2011)
  - Black African: 99.3%
  - Coloured: 0.3%
  - Indian/Asian: 0.2%
  - White: 0.1%
  - Other: 0.1%

First languages (2011)
  - Zulu: 46.8%
  - Sotho: 18.0%
  - Xhosa: 8.2%
  - Northern Sotho: 7.3%
  - Other: 19.7%
- Time zone: UTC+2 (SAST)
- Postal code (street): 1475
- PO box: 1486

Vosloorus is a large township situated south of Boksburg and just east of Katlehong in Ekurhuleni, just 30 kilometres south-east of Johannesburg, Gauteng, South Africa. It was established in 1963 when Black Africans were removed from Stirtonville because it was considered by the government too close to a white town. Stirtonville, renamed Reiger Park, has since become home to Boksburg's coloured community. A local authority was established in 1983 when Vosloorus was given full municipal status.

== Notable residents ==
- Sol Phenduka - radio personality, music DJ and podcaster.
- Boohle - Amapiano singer-songwriter
- De Mthuda - record producer and DJ
- DJ Cleo - house music producer, DJ and recording artist.
- Moses Sithole - serial killer and rapist
- David Tlale - fashion designer
- Fortune Makaringe - soccer player
- Alfred Ntombela - actor
- DJ Clock - DJ and producer
- Naledi Chirwa - South African politician and former student activist
- Kelly Khumalo - South African Singer
