= Greater Johannesburg =

Metropolitan conurbation in Gauteng, South Africa

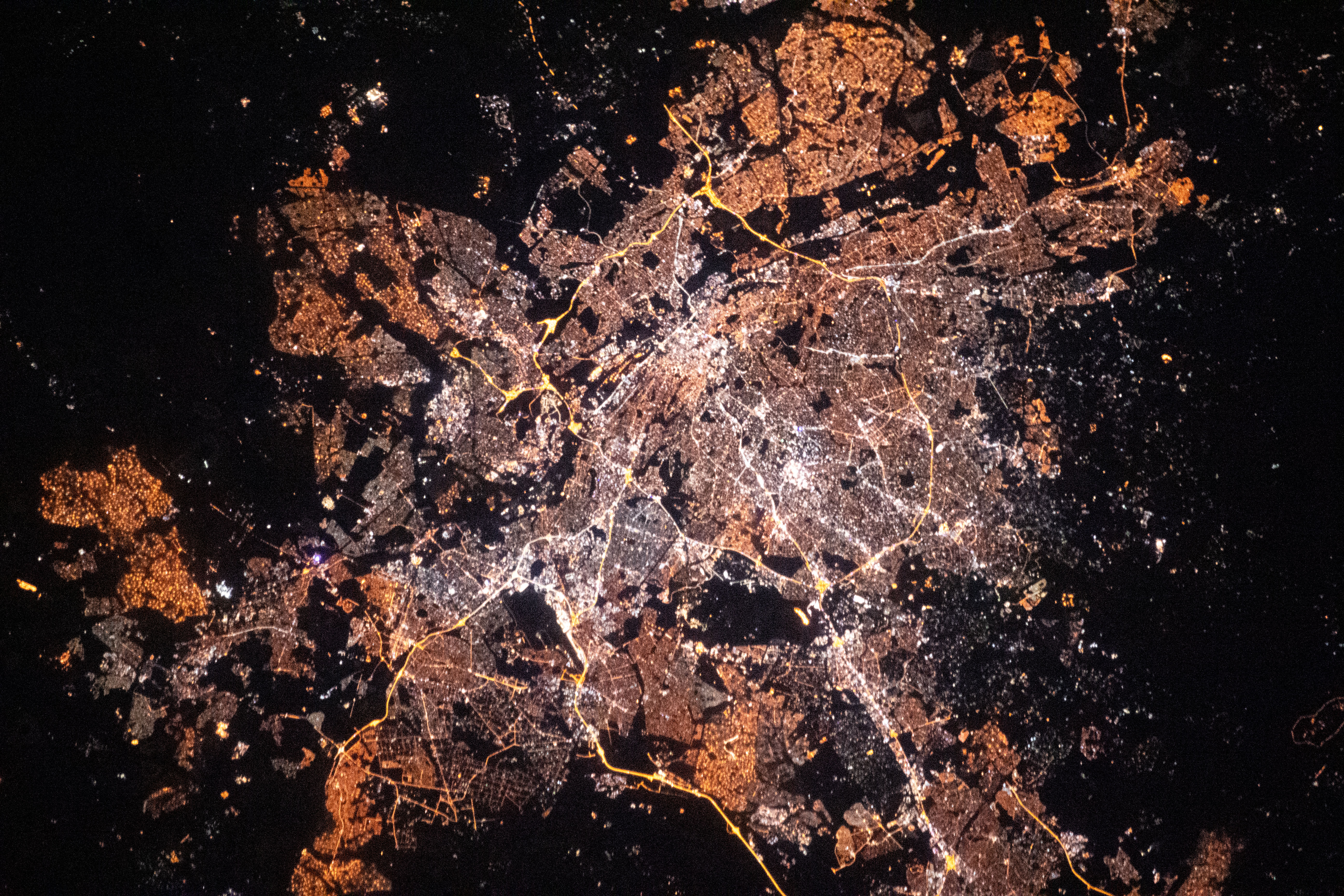
Aerial view of Greater Johannesburg at night in 2020

The term Greater Johannesburg may refer to:

- The area governed by the Greater Johannesburg Metropolitan Council (GJMC) from 1995 to 2000.
- The current City of Johannesburg Metropolitan Municipality, which superseded the GJMC in 2000 with the incorporation of much of Midrand and some of Modderfontein.
- The place itemised in the 1996 census, defined as the MLC's constituting the GJMC (i.e. Northern, Eastern, Western and Southern Johannesburg MLC's) plus Kempton Park/Tembisa MLC, Edenvale/Modderfontein MLC and Midrand/Rabie Ridge/Ivory Park. As of 2017 the name "Greater Johannesburg" has not been used in any subsequent census.
- The Johannesburg conurbation which includes Johannesburg and the areas of the East Rand, area under the Ekurhuleni Metropolitan Municipality and the West Rand. It is often referred to as the Witwatersrand, or Rand, after a low mountain range that runs through the area. Greater Johannesburg's growth was largely based initially on the discovery of gold, and the urban area runs the length of the gold-bearing reef from east to west. The case for including the East and West Rand in Johannesburg, as well as Soweto, is based on a number of factors:
  - The area shares the same dialling code, 011 and 010
  - The East Rand and Soweto campuses of the former Vista University are incorporated into the University of Johannesburg.
  - OR Tambo International Airport, which serves Johannesburg, is located in the East Rand.
  - Roodepoort, always traditionally part of the West Rand, was incorporated into the City of Johannesburg Metropolitan Municipality in 2000, while Soweto, always regarded as Johannesburg's sister city or major township during Apartheid, was administered as part of the West Rand in the past.
  - Residents from both the East and the West Rand often work in Johannesburg.
  - The areas are not only strongly linked economically, but existing transport axes have also created strong functional links between Johannesburg and its hinterland.
  - Eastgate Shopping Centre, Johannesburg, the second-largest in the metro area, straddles the border between Johannesburg and Ekurhuleni.
  - Vehicles of the Johannesburg Metro Police Department (JMPD) and the Ekurhuleni Metropolitan Police Department (EMPD) are identical in design, but JMPDs are orange and EMPDs are yellow. The JMPD and EMPD sometimes carry out joint operations.
  - Transport routes between Johannesburg, East and West Rand share the same metropolitan route numbering system.

== See also ==
- Witwatersrand
