= Discrimination against lesbians =

Irrational fear of, and aversion to, lesbians

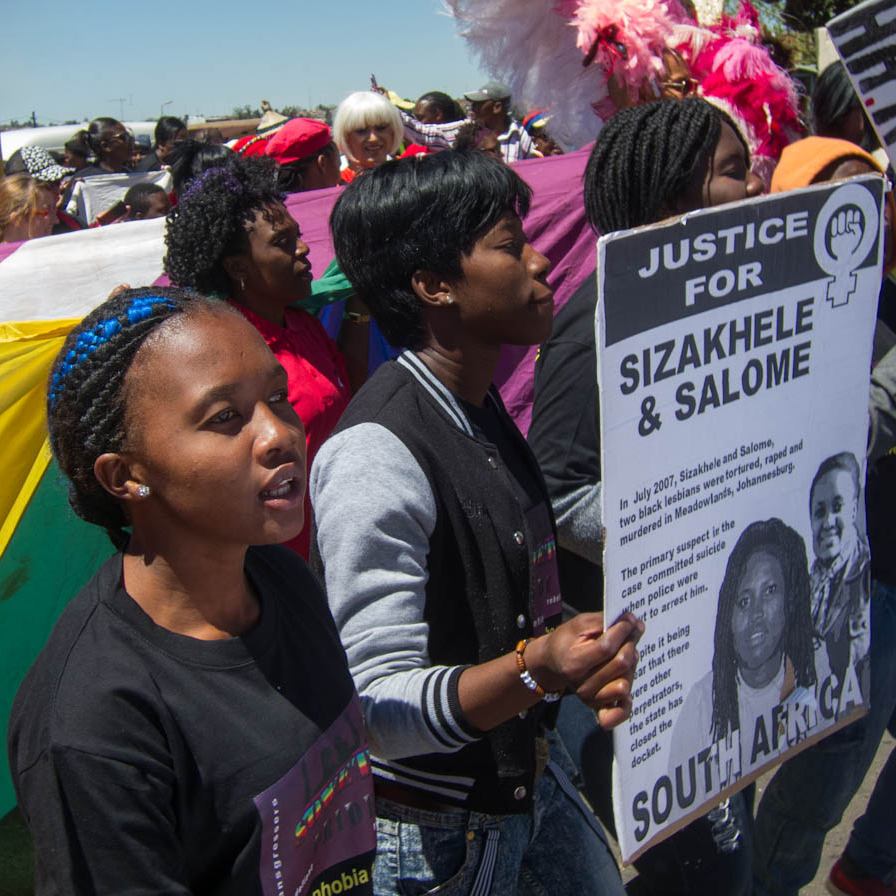
Soweto Pride 2012 participants remember lesbians raped and murdered in 2007.

Discrimination against lesbians, sometimes referred as lesbophobia or lesphobia, is a form of homophobia, often paired with misogyny, that comprises various forms of prejudice and negativity towards lesbians as individuals, as couples, as a group, or lesbianism in general.

Examples of discrimination against lesbians include, but are not limited to, discrimination in housing and employment, physical or sexual abuse, including corrective rape, lack of legal protections for lesbian couples to care for one another, removal of children from lesbian mothers, negative stereotypes and negative media representation, verbal harassment, legal persecution and imprisonment, government censorship, and familial and/or community rejection.

Lesbophobia is analogous to gayphobia, which is discrimination against male homosexuals.

== Terminology ==
The first usage of the term lesbophobia – a portmanteau of lesbo- (for lesbian) and -phobia (Greek for 'fear') – listed in the Oxford English Dictionary is in The Erotic Life of the American Wife (1972), a book by Harper's Bazaar editor Natalie Gittelson. It is defined as a form of prejudice and discrimination against lesbians, and is a part of homophobia. However, as homophobia has strong correlations with sexism, more specifically misogyny, acts of lesbophobia often are a mix of both; most notably including corrective rape, assault, harassment, bullying, murder, fetishization, and lesbian erasure.

== Types ==
=== Jurisdictional ===
As lesbians are female homosexuals, legal legislation against lesbians is generally bundled with other anti-homosexual legislation. According to Human Rights Watch, there are at least 67 jurisdictions that impose laws and penalties against same-sex sexual activity as of 2026; at least 38 of which having laws explicitly criminalizing lesbian sex. Penalties against lesbian sex vary by country, including imprisonment, caning, and flagellation.

=== Sexual ===
Many lesbian women report experiences of heterosexual men being obsessed with them, often portrayed in the form desiring to "fix or convert" lesbian women to straight women through sexual intercourse or romantic relationships with men. Additionally, women are often requested to perform acts of lesbian sex in front of a male audience to authenticate their sexuality, and further marginalizing them.

"Lesbian" ranks among some of the most popular search terms on popular pornography sites. In heterosexual pornography, there are many tropes including either straight men "fixing" lesbians, or lesbians hitting on straight women, perpetuating the stereotypes that lesbianism is something to be "fixed", that female sexuality is not to be taken seriously, and that lesbians are predatory.

=== Lesbian erasure ===
Lesbian erasure refers to the process of ignoring, discarding, or purposefully writing out the history and struggles of lesbians. This term can refer to writing lesbians out of history, such as writing out Stormé DeLarverie from starting the Stonewall riots.

=== Anti-lesbian beliefs and stereotypes ===
The idea that lesbians are dangerous—while heterosexual interactions are natural, normal, and spontaneous—is a common example of beliefs that are lesbophobic. Like homophobia, this belief is classed as heteronormative, as it assumes that heterosexuality is dominant, presumed, and normal, and that other sexual or relationship arrangements are abnormal and unnatural. Lesbians encounter lesbophobic attitudes not only from straight men and women, but also gay men. Lesbophobia in gay men is regarded as manifest in the perceived subordination of lesbian issues in the campaign for gay rights.

Lesbians have been stereotyped in often contradictory ways. Kim Emery, in discussing lesbians in the United States during the late-19th century, says:

It is a truism […] that lesbian existence is inflected and afflicted by apparently incompatible social stereotypes. Lesbians are assumed to be both men in women's bodies and women marked as masculine by physical anomaly. Lesbians are accused of hating men and of wanting to be men, of being both sexually predatory and essentially asexual [sic], of committing unspeakable sexual acts and of lacking the endowments necessary to perform any [sexual acts].

A stereotype that has been identified as lesbophobic is that female athletes are always or predominantly lesbians.

=== Corrective rape ===
Corrective rape is a hate crime in which lesbian women are raped by heterosexual men under the belief that penetrative sex will change or eliminate their sexual orientation. Perpetrators have been documented telling victims that they are curing them, doing them a favor, teaching them a lesson, or showing them how to be a real woman during these attacks.

The term was coined in South Africa following the rape and murder of Eudy Simelane in 2008, but the practice has also been documented internationally. In Jamaica, parents have reportedly hired men to rape their lesbian daughters. Cases have been documented in Zimbabwe, Uganda, and India, typically perpetrated by family members or acquaintances.

== Extent ==
=== Africa ===
In the late 2000s, men murdered and raped several lesbians in South Africa. The victims included Sizakele Sigasa (a lesbian activist living in Soweto) and her partner Salome Masooa, who were raped, tortured, and murdered in an attack that South African lesbian-gay rights organizations, including the umbrella-group Joint Working Group, said were driven by lesbophobia. In the Gauteng township of KwaThema, soccer player Eudy Simelane was gang-raped, beaten and stabbed to death, and LGBTQ activist Noxolo Nogwaza was raped and stoned before being stabbed to death. Zanele Muholi, community relations director of a lesbian rights group, reports having recorded 50 rape cases over the past decade involving black lesbians in townships, stating: "The problem is largely that of patriarchy. The men who perpetrate such crimes see rape as curative and as an attempt to show women their place in society." Corrective rape is an ongoing social problem in South Africa.

=== Americas ===
In 1995, lesbian couple and gay rights activists Roxanne Ellis and Michelle Abdill were murdered in Oregon. Their killer stated that their being lesbians made it easier to kill them. He also murdered a bisexual man for making a pass at him.

=== Europe ===
In its 2019 annual report, France's SOS Homophobie found that anti-lesbian violence increased 42 percent in France in 2018, with 365 attacks reported.

== See also ==
- Compulsory heterosexuality
- Discrimination
- Biphobia
- Heterosexism
- History of lesbianism
- Societal attitudes toward homosexuality
- Violence against LGBTQ people
- Violence against women
