= Noxolo Nogwaza =

South African LGBTQ activist

- Born: 1987
- Died: April 24, 2011 (aged 23–24)
- Citizenship: South Africa
- Occupation: Human rights defender
- Organization: Ekurhuleni Pride Organising Community

Noxolo Nogwaza (1987 – 24 April 2011) was a South African lesbian LGBTQ rights activist and member of the Ekurhuleni Pride Organising Committee. She was raped, then stoned and stabbed to death by assailants in KwaThema, Gauteng. Nogwaza had been with a friend at a bar the previous evening, and had a heated argument with a group of men who had propositioned her friend.

== Life and death ==
Police found used condoms, a beer bottle, and a large rock around Nogwaza's body, which was left in a drainage ditch.

The attack on Nogwaza appeared to be a corrective rape, a practice by which men sexually assault women believed to be lesbians in an attempt to "correct" their sexual preference. 31 women had been murdered during corrective rape in South Africa over the previous decade, and according to the rape survivor charity Luleki Sizwe, at least 10 lesbians per week were raped in the Cape Town area. Human Rights Watch described the attack as part of a hate crime "epidemic" against South African gays, comparing it to the rape and murder of footballer and lesbian activist Eudy Simelane in the same township three years before.

More than 2,000 people attended her funeral. At one point, some of the mourners sang that they would castrate the suspects with razor blades themselves if police failed to arrest them. 170,000 people worldwide signed a petition for authorities to crack down on corrective rape.

Noxolo left behind 2 young children. After her death, the US-based nonprofit GO Campaign stepped in to raise funds for the children's education and to promote a tolerance campaign for youth in the township.

Human Rights Watch and Amnesty International called the killing a hate crime. A police spokesperson refused to classify it as a hate crime, stating, "murder is murder" and that police did not consider a victim's sexual orientation. No arrests had been made in the case of as November 2012.

In November 2012, Amnesty International featured the case in its "Write for Rights" campaign, calling for a renewed investigation into the murder.
