= Sexual assault of LGBTQ people =

Sexual assault awareness is represented by the color teal.

Sexual assault of LGBTQ people is a form of violence against people in the LGBTQ community or sexual and gender minorities (SGM). While sexual assault and other forms of interpersonal violence can occur in all forms of relationships, sexual minorities experience it at rates that are equal to or higher than their heterosexual and cisgender counterparts. There is a lack of research on this specific problem for the LGBTQ population as a whole, but there does exist a substantial amount of research on college LGBTQ students who have experienced sexual assault and sexual harassment.

== Definition ==
There are varying definitions as to what sexual assault is defined as. According to the United States Department of Justice:

The term "sexual assault" means any nonconsensual sexual act proscribed by Federal, tribal, or State law, including when the victim lacks capacity to consent.

Definitions and laws of sexual assault vary from state to state. The website FindLaw allows users to click on their corresponding to state to read about how their state defines what sexual assault is, as well as what laws and limitations exist. Sexual assault of LGBTQ individuals refers to the act of sexual violence against persons who identify as lesbian, gay, bisexual, or transgender amongst other sexualities and sexual minorities.

== Social constructive theories ==
Sexual violence against LGBTQ people, also known as Sexual and Gender Minorities (SGM), occurs within the context of a misogynistic, homophobic and transphobic world. Prejudice and discrimination experienced by SGM populations contribute to their experience of minority stress.

Minority stress posits that prejudice and discrimination against SGM populations cause and maintain health disparities. SGM victims are less likely than heterosexual victims to find formal refuge from sexual violence and receive appropriate care due to historical biases in legislation and domestic violence shelters tailoring their services towards cisgender and heterosexual female victims. Despite the influence of group coalitions led by women of color, disabled women, and transgender survivors in activism against sexual assault, the Violence Against Women Act (VAWA) of 1994 centered a monolithic approach to supporting survivors, primarily who were white heterosexual cisgender women, and took a carceral approach to funding DV shelters (i.e., required survivors to report abusers to law enforcement in order to receive shelter). A systemic review stated that in 2011, 61% of SGM reported being turned away by domestic violence (DV) shelters. Although in 2013 the Violence Against Women Act explicitly barred discrimination on basis of race, gender, sexual orientation, and disability, no follow up research has been done to assess the compliance of DV shelters. The VAWA became so linked to law enforcement involvement, it did not match the approach to accountability and care desired by survivors holding marginalized intersectional identities whom have mistrust of law enforcement.

Additionally, older research on DV shelters have demonstrated a lack of competence and attunement to servicing SGM survivors, which often perpetuated harm towards these communities. Systemic erasure of SGM denies victims services that take into account their unique experiences with interpersonal and systemic harm and adds to their minority stress. Minority stress also relates to intersectionality. The theory of intersectionality explores how varied identities held by an individual (i.e., race, SES, gender identity, sexual orientation, etc.) may interact with one another within a given social and political context. The nature of the sexual assault is shaped by the way intersecting identities interact with their social context, often shaping the nature of the sexual assault, the outcomes, and access to services post-assault. For example, African American women experience high rates of sexual assault, often relating to the historic stigmatization and fetishization of African American women sexuality, however, research shows they are less likely to disclose survivorship and seek out support due to stigma.

== Statistics ==
=== Intersectionality within U.S. statistics ===
Discussions on sexual assault have often ignored intersectionality and primarily focused on heterosexual dynamics, much less has been explored on how sexual assault is experienced among sexual and gender minorities (SGM) and the intersections of marginalized identities (i.e., race, gender, incarcerated, SES, etc.).

==== Incarcerated SGM ====
For example, institutionalized racism within the criminal legal system and accounts of police brutality make it less likely for SGM victims to involve the criminal legal system in the aftermath of sexual assault. Reluctance to involve the legal system is particularly true for victims of color and sex workers. Within prisons, incarcerated gay (38%) and bisexual (33.7%) men are more likely than heterosexual men (3.5%) to be sexually violated by other inmates. Gay (11.8%) and bisexual men (17.5%) were sexually assaulted by prison staff compared to heterosexual men (5.2%). A different pattern is observed among incarcerated women. Incarcerated bisexual women (18.1%) are at a higher risk for sexual violation by other inmates than lesbian (12.1%) and heterosexual (13.1%) women. Compared to incarcerated heterosexual women, both lesbian and bisexual women are at higher risk for sexual violence victimization by prison staff. Transgender people are at a higher risk of sexual victimization within prisons compared to cisgender inmates. Transgender women incarcerated in men's prisons are at high risk of sexual violence.

==== Sexual minorities ====
Within the general sexual minority, population research has consistently shown that bisexuals experience sexual assault more commonly throughout their lifetime than gay and lesbian people. Additionally, sexual minorities are more likely to be sexually assaulted while being incapacitated from substance use than heterosexuals.

- Bisexual women (46.1%) experience sexual assault at higher rates than lesbian (13.1%) and heterosexual (17.1%) women.
- Among men, gay (40.2%) and bisexual (47.4%) men are twice as likely as heterosexual men (20.8%) to experience sexual abuse.
- 43.5% of asexual individuals have reported revictimization of sexual assault.

According to a 2010 findings on The National Intimate Partner and Sexual Violence Survey, put out by the Centers for Disease Control and Prevention, the CDC concluded that:

- For American lesbian women (118 lesbian women completed the survey):
  - 44% experienced rape, physical violence, and/or stalking by an intimate partner in their lifetime.
  - Approximately 1 in 8 (13%) have been raped in their lifetime.
- For American gay men (148 gay men completed the survey):
  - 26% experienced rape, physical violence, and/or stalking by an intimate partner in their lifetime.
  - 4 in 10 (40%) have experienced sexual violence other than rape in their lifetime.
- For American bisexual women (199 bisexual women completed the survey):
  - 61% experienced rape, physical violence, and/or stalking by an intimate partner at some point in their lifetime.
  - 1 in 5 (22%) have been raped by an intimate partner in their lifetime.
  - 46% have been raped in their lifetime.
- For American bisexual men (96 bisexual men completed the survey):
  - 37% experienced rape, physical violence, and/or stalking by an intimate partner in their lifetime.
  - 47% have experienced sexual violence other than rape in their lifetime.

In regard to lifetime sexual assault victimization, the estimated prevalence for lesbian and bisexual women was approximately 12.6 - 85%. For gay and bisexual men, it was 11.8-54.0%. Their paper used data from 75 different studies on lifetime sexual assault victimization in the United States. Research also shows that among self-identified lesbians in same-sex relationships sexual violence is the least common form of intimate partner violence, followed by physical violence, and psychological/emotional violence is the most prevalent. The previous findings emphasize the fact that sexual violence and its outcomes are influenced by the intersecting identities held by victims, and as a result, the prevalence and manifestation vary across intersecting identities.

==== Gender minorities ====
Gender minorities are at high risk for sexual assault. Transgender and gender-diverse individuals experience high rates of sexual assault; however, there are mixed reports about whether transgender women or transgender men experience more rates of sexual victimization. A meta-analysis suggested that transgender men (51%) and assigned female at birth (AFAB) nonbinary (58%) individuals are sexually victimized at higher rates than transgender women (37%) and assigned male at birth (AMAB) nonbinary (41%) individuals. The Rape, Abuse and Incest National Network, also known as RAINN found that 21% of TGQN (transgender, genderqueer, nonconforming) college students have been sexually assaulted.

==== SGM child sexual assault ====
Research also suggests that SGM youth are often targeted for childhood sexual assault. Among American transgender youth, restricted access to gendered facilities in schools (such as bathrooms and locker rooms) increased their likelihood of sexual harassment and sexual victimization by peers.

== Obstacles preventing LGBTQ people from reporting assault ==
Despite facing a higher rates of sexual assault than heterosexual and cisgender people, members of the LGBTQ community do not report sexual assault as much. Many are afraid of mistreatment due to their sexual or gender orientation, with 85% of victim advocates stating that LGBTQ victims they have worked with have been denied services due to their identities. Many also fear being outed in the process of reporting assault.

=== Stigma and stereotypes ===
Aside from systemic influence, minority stress also manifests in the form of stigma, stereotypes, and discrimination that shape the nature of sexual violence. The underlying issues of sexual assault against LGBTQ persons includes homophobia and transphobia among other forms of prejudice against sexual minorities. One barrier to help-seeking research has found for LGBTQ victims of sexual assault has been the minimization of their experience. Minimization refers to downplaying of the implications and consequences of sexual assault by either the victim or individuals whom they tell about the assault. A risk factor for sexual violence and IPV in same-sex relationships include homophobic stigma and internalized homophobic stigma. Common stereotypes assume that sexual violence is only experienced in heterosexual dynamics and that all same-sex relationships are egalitarian. Discrimination towards SGM may lead some individuals to conceal their sexual and gender orientation from those in their circle (i.e., family, friends, co-workers, etc.). SGM's decisions to conceal one's sexual or gender identity are known to be weaponized by same-sex partner's through "homophobic controlling behaviors," the act of threatening to disclose their partner's sexual orientation as a form of sexual coercion and emotional abuse. Some research has suggested that bisexual women are hypersexualized and targeted for sexual violence. Additionally, stigmas held within hypermasculine cultures associate femininity with weakness and submission often motivate sexual violence towards transgender women and cisgender women.

=== Transgender people ===
Transgender people and other gender minorities (non-binary people, etc.) are over four times more likely to experience sexual violence with one in two transgender people experiencing some form of sexual abuse or assault in their lives (about 47% of transgender people) than their cisgender counterparts. This number only increases for gender minorities of colour, that do sex work, are homeless, and have disabilities. About 57% of these victims, however, have reported feeling uncomfortable reporting their assaults to the authorities, and 58% reported mistreatment by law enforcement, including but not limited to misgendering and verbal, physical, and further sexual assault.

According to scholars Adam M. Messinger and Xavier L. Guadalupe-Diaz, sexual assault and intimate partner violence (IPV) against transgender people is distinct because of two societal norms: cisnormativity and transphobia. They expand upon this in their book, Transgender Intimate Partner Violence, where cisnormativity is defined as "the expectation that all people are cisgender, along with the privileging of cisgender experience and the pathologizing of transgender experience," and transphobia as "a strong dislike of or fear of transgender people." They argue that cisnormativity and transphobia put transgender people in a more vulnerable position that leads to more assault and IPV. Using a case study of a transgender boy referred to as Joe, Messinger and Guadalupe-Diaz state that Joe was too afraid to go to the police for assault and IPV for fear of being invalidated as a male victim, being discriminated against for being transgender, and for fear that the police would arrest him instead of his abuser, something that happens to transgender people more frequently than their cisgender counterparts due to a stereotype that transgender people are more violent or sexual.

== Survivorship self-disclosure ==
Self-disclosure on sexual violence varies across SGM. In regard to self-disclosure type (i.e., lifetime, child sexual assault, hate crime-related sexual assault), lesbian and bisexual women are more likely to report lifetime experiences of sexual violence and intimate partner sexual violence compared to gay and bisexual men. Gay and bisexual men are more likely than lesbian and bisexual women to disclose sexual violence victimization as a hate crime. 59% of gay and bisexual men disclose experiencing childhood sexual abuse.

Another facet of the disclosure includes the source type or the source to which the survivor divulges their sexual assault. SGM survivors more frequently disclose their SA experience to informal sources (i.e., family, friends, peers, partners, etc.) than formal sources (i.e., police, doctors, therapists, etc.); this is often related to individual and institutionalized stigma & discrimination.

Social responses to disclosure can potentially buffer or exacerbate (i.e., retraumatization) negative outcomes following sexual assault. Among SGM survivors, negative social response to self-disclosure of sexual assault relates to increased risk for PTSD and higher levels of distress. SGM survivors disclosing to formal sources are more likely to receive negative social responses than when disclosing to informal sources. Research shows that SGM survivors are met with mixed social responses to their sexual assault disclosure. Notably, bisexual women more commonly experience negative social reactions to their SA disclosure when compared to non-SGM women, and a similar parallel exists among transgender survivors when compared to cisgender.

== See also ==
- Corrective rape
- Forced marriage of LGBTQ people
- LGBTQ rights by country or territory
- Violence against LGBTQ people
