= Corrective rape =

Homophobic hate crime

Corrective rape, also called curative rape or homophobic rape, is a hate crime in which somebody is raped because of their perceived sexual orientation or gender identity. The common intended consequence of the rape, as claimed by the perpetrator, is to turn the person heterosexual.

The term was coined in South Africa after well-known cases of corrective rapes of lesbian women such as Eudy Simelane (who was also murdered in the same attack) and Zoliswa Nkonyana became public. Popularization of the term has raised awareness and encouraged LGBTQ+ people in countries across the world to come forward with their own stories of being raped as punishment for or in an attempt to change their sexual orientation or gender identity. Although some countries have laws protecting LGBTQ+ people, corrective rape is often overlooked. South African researcher Kylie Thomas offers a critique of the terms "corrective" and "curative" rape in her report, "Homophobia, Injustice and 'Corrective Rape' in Post-Apartheid South Africa".

== Definitions ==
Corrective rape is the use of rape against people who do not conform to perceived social norms regarding human sexuality or gender roles. The goal is to punish perceived abnormal behavior and reinforce societal norms. The crime was first identified in South Africa, where it is sometimes supervised by members of the woman's family or local community. One of the earliest known mentions of the term is by South African feminist activist Bernedette Muthien during an August 2001 interview by Human Rights Watch in Cape Town:

Lesbians are particularly targeted for gang rape. African lesbians are more likely to be raped as lesbians in the townships. To what extent are coloured lesbians also targeted for rape because of their sexual orientation? There are no statistics for this, and I don't know what percent of coloured lesbians are targeted for corrective rape action. Growing up, I never heard that lesbians were targeted in this way and so I want to know when that started happening. Gangsterism has always existed in the townships, so you can't attribute it to that. I don't know why black lesbians are targeted more, either. I'd like to know how many women are being raped by brothers, fathers, etc., in coloured townships. Why is no one studying this? Has it just been under-reported, not studied, or what?

The United Nations UNAIDS 2015 Terminology Guidelines suggests that the term corrective rape should no longer be used, as it gives off the perception that something needs to be fixed. The guidelines propose that the term homophobic rape should be used instead. The words "so-called 'curative' or 'corrective' rape" were mentioned in 2011 in the first UN report on discrimination and violence against LGBTQ+ people. A 2013 global study on HIV/AIDS suggested the term lesphobic rape to emphasize the fact that lesbians constitute the overwhelming majority of victims of this phenomenon. Others have emphasized that other members of the LGBTQ community can also be victims of corrective rape for similar reasons.

== Contributing factors and motivations ==
Corrective rape is a hate crime. A 2000 study suggested an atmosphere supportive of hate crimes against gay men and lesbians, reactions to hate crimes by the broader community, and responses by police and justice systems contribute to corrective rape.

Often corrective rape is framed as something that can "fix" people who do not conform to gender norms or who are not heterosexual. ActionAid reports that survivors remember being told that they were being taught a lesson. Some perpetrators of the hate crime are impelled by a sense of misogyny and chauvinism. Personal experiences have included female victims being told they were "being shown what they were missing" while male victims have related gang rape accounts "where the objective was to make the experience of being sexually receptive so violent and frightening that the victim would fear potential homosexual experiences afterward".

Some sources argue that many cases of corrective rape are caused by drawing moral conclusions from the nature–nurture debate. Despite the scientific community concluding that sexual orientation is the result of biology and environment, many people do not believe that homosexuality (or other forms of non-heterosexuality) has a genetic basis and instead believe it is only the result of one's environment. Because of this, some of these people believe sexual orientation can be changed or, as they see it, corrected.

== Intersectionality ==
Intersectionality is intersecting social identities and related systems of oppression, domination, or discrimination. In South Africa, Black lesbians may face homophobia, sexism, racism, and classism. Research in 2008 by Triangle Project, an LGBTQI rights group, revealed that Black lesbians were twice as afraid of sexual assault than white lesbians. Taking into account race and sexuality together is essential when examining corrective rape, as both subjects cross into each other and influence each other heavily.

Intersectionality plays a major role in corrective rape cases. Sexuality and gender especially, define the social and political rank of victims. Many are ostracized, and other abusive measures are taken in order to "cure" individuals of their sexuality. According to Sarah Doan-Minh, corrective rape is a type of "systemic, group-based violence", which is deeply tied to traditional gender and sexual norms, rather than simply being the result of interpersonal dynamics.

== Prevalence ==
Corrective rape has been reported in countries across the world including Ecuador, Haiti, India, Jamaica, Kenya, Kyrgyzstan, the Netherlands, Nigeria, Peru, South Africa, Thailand, Uganda, Ukraine, the United Kingdom, the United States, and Zimbabwe.

=== India ===
According to statistics from the Crisis Intervention Team of LGBT Collective in Telangana, India, in 2024 there had been 15 reported instances of corrective rape in the previous five years. Corrective rape in India typically happens in order to protect the family name, and to prevent abnormal perception by the surrounding community. In India, there is a generally negative attitude towards homosexuality and the fact is that individuals in India who identify as homosexual are victimized at a higher rate. There is also a high level of negativity towards the trans community in India.

=== Jamaica ===
Amnesty International has received reports of violence against lesbians in Jamaica, including rape and other forms of sexual violence. Lesbians reportedly have been attacked on the grounds of masculine physical appearance or other visible signs of sexuality. Some reports of abduction and rape come from inner-city communities, where local non-governmental organizations have expressed concerns about high incidents of violence against women.

=== Kenya ===
In Kenya, perpetrators and supporters of this form of violence claim that rape is a method "to straighten" LGBTQ people.

=== Nigeria ===
In Nigeria, lesbians are the major victims of corrective rape and this has roots in patriarchy. To many Nigerians, it is incomprehensible that women may seek relationships with people other than men.

=== South Africa ===
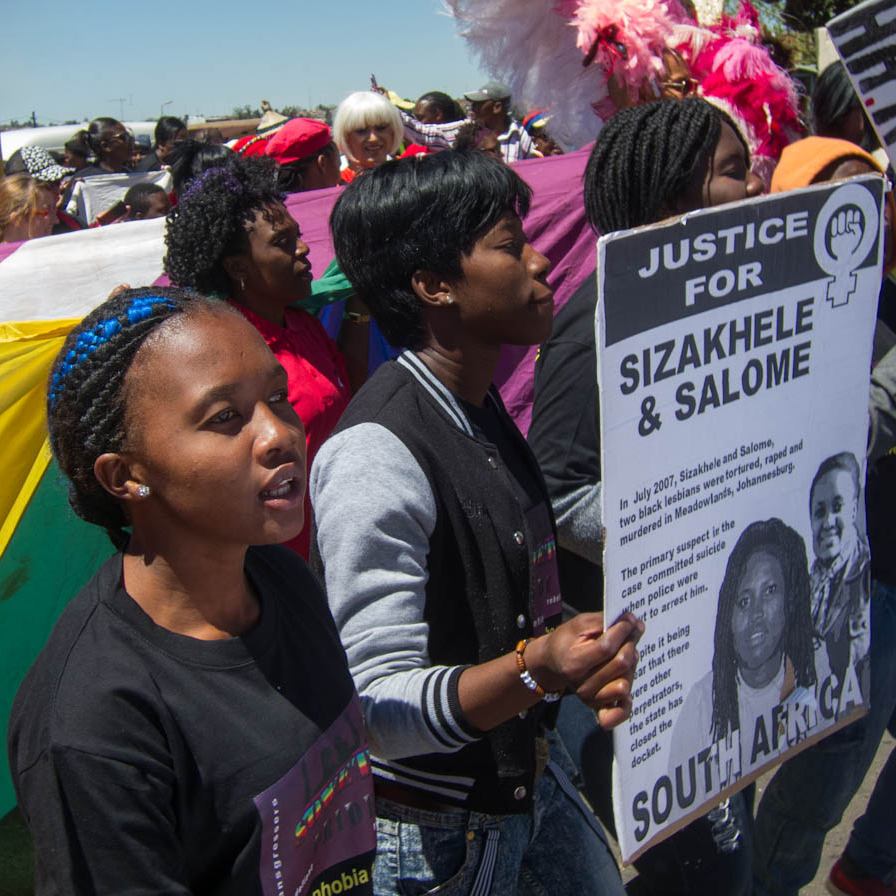
Soweto Pride 2012 participants remember two lesbians who were raped and murdered in 2007.

While South Africa is known to be one of the more LGBTQ-friendly nations in the southern parts of Africa, corrective rape is still reported in South Africa. Rape, including corrective rape, disproportionately affects Black women.

In South Africa, women are often seen as having less sexual and economic power than men. One of the factors associated with this inequality is strict gender roles, which have led to one of the highest rates of violence against women in the world. The South African government conducted a survey in 2009 on sexual assault. One in four men admitted to engaging in sexual activity with a woman who did not consent and nearly half of those men admitted to raping more than once. It is also estimated that a woman is raped every 26 seconds in South Africa. Corrective rape is used as a punishment for people who are gay or do not fit traditional gender roles, where often they are verbally abused before the rape. The perpetrator may claim to be teaching the women a lesson on how to be a "real woman". Because women have less control over their economic situation, which creates economic vulnerability, they have less control over their own sexual activities. Poor Black women who live in townships are more likely to become victims of corrective violence, and gay women are more likely to be isolated with little support, which increases their chances of being targeted.

The South African Constitution states that no person shall be discriminated against based on their gender, race, or sexual orientation. The Equality Act of 2000 specifically bans hate crimes, or crimes in which people are targeted because of one or more aspects of their identity. Although this technically includes crimes based on sexual orientation, in practice, such cases are not brought to trial. Crimes based on sexual orientation are not expressly recognized in South Africa; corrective rape reports are not separated from general rape reports. In December 2009, there had been 31 recorded murders of lesbians in South Africa since 1998, but only one had resulted in a conviction.

The reason for this discrepancy between the law and practice is a result of heteronormativity and homophobia in South Africa. Heteronormativity can be defined as "the institutions, structures of understanding, and practical orientations that make heterosexuality not only seem coherent—that is organised as a sexuality—but also privileged". Some historians believe the heteronormativity in South Africa can be attributed to the nation's postcolonial years of racism, and it appears that today many South Africans are recommitted to their traditional heritage. Black South African lesbians are not included in this social construction, and this leads back to the concept of intersectionality. Black lesbians in South Africa are not only excluded because of their sexual orientation but also because of their ethnicity. As displayed in the media, most homosexuality is displayed as white, leaving Black lesbians in South African even more marginalized. In South Africa, homosexuality is regarded as "un-African" by some. In 2004, the Human Sciences Research Council found that 78% of the respondents thought of homosexuality as unacceptable.

Corrective rape is on the rise in South Africa. More than 10 lesbians are raped weekly to "correct" their sexual preferences, as estimated by Luleki Sizwe, a South African nonprofit. It is estimated that at least 500 lesbians become victims of corrective rape every year and that 86% of black lesbians in the Western Cape live in fear of being sexually assaulted, as reported by the Triangle Project in 2008. Yet, victims of corrective rape are less likely to report it because of the negative social view of homosexuality. Under-reporting is high for sexually violent crimes, thus the number of corrective rapes are likely higher than what is reported.

Although it is thought to be uncommon, men also become victims of corrective rape. A study conducted by OUT LGBT Well-being and the University of South Africa Centre for Applied Psychology (UCAP) showed that "the percentage of black gay men who said they have experienced corrective rape matched that of the black lesbians who partook in the study". However, not all men admit to being victims of corrective rape.

One South African man stated, "Lesbians get raped and killed because it is accepted by our community and by our culture." Kekelesto explained that her experience as "where men try to turn you into a real African woman" and that she was being taught how to be a Black woman.

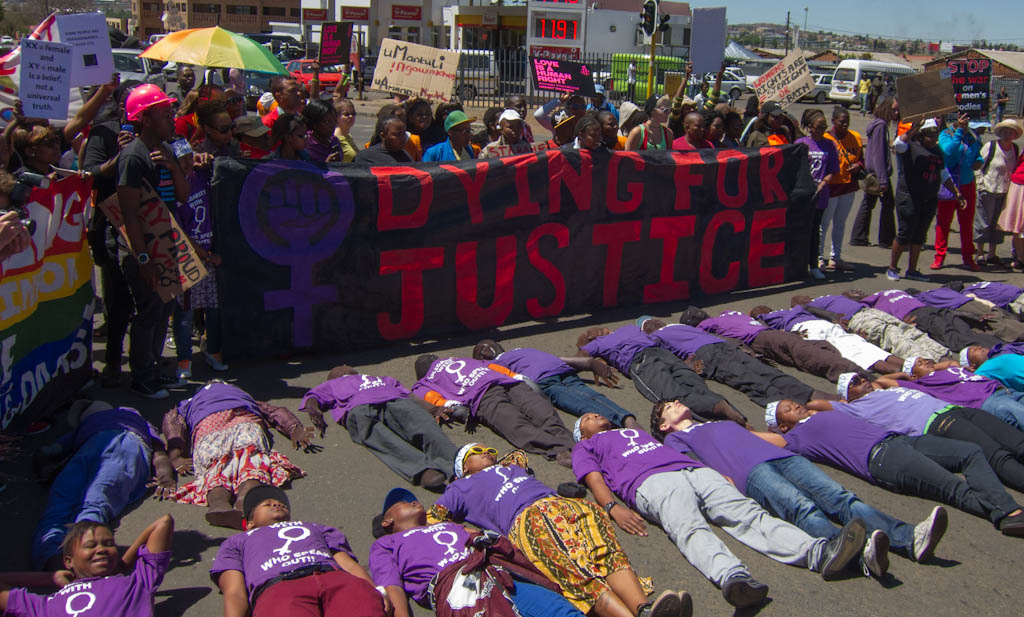
Soweto Pride 2012 participants protest against violence against lesbians with a "Dying for Justice" banner and T-shirts which read "Solidarity with women who speak out".

Galip Asvat, a successful hair salon business owner, is a gay man born in Klerksdorp. He moved to Hillbrow, which was a haven for the LGBTQ community, in the early 2000s. One early morning in 2007, Asvat was ambushed and raped by three men in his apartment building. On his attack, he said, "They thought I was a woman, and when they found out I was a man, that's when they became even more violent." His beating was brutal, and the gang of men nearly cut off his genitals.

Sizakele Sigasa, a lesbian activist living in Soweto, and her partner Salome Masooa were raped, tortured, and murdered in July 2007. South African lesbian-gay rights organizations, including the umbrella-group Joint Working Group, said the attack was driven by lesbophobia. Two other rape/murders of lesbians occurred in South Africa earlier in Summer 2007: Simangele Nhlapo, member of an HIV-positive support group was raped and murdered in June, along with her two-year-old daughter; and Madoe Mafubedu, age 16, was raped and stabbed to death.

On 28 April 2008, 31-year-old soccer player Eudy Simelane was abducted, gang-raped and killed in KwaThema, her hometown near Johannesburg. Simelane was a star of the South Africa's acclaimed Banyana Banyana national female football squad, an avid equality rights campaigner, and one of the first women to live openly as a lesbian in KwaThema.

On 24 April 2011, LGBTQ activist Noxolo Nogwaza was raped and murdered in KwaThema.

In 2013, two writers from South African men's magazine FHM were fired as a result of corrective rape jokes they made on Facebook. After a disciplinary hearing on Friday, 19 July 2013, FHM dismissed both men from their positions, calling their comments "entirely unacceptable".

South Africa is a signatory of the Convention on the Elimination of All Forms of Discrimination Against Women (CEDAW), which obligates states to remove discriminatory barriers from the full and free exercise of rights by women. The convention's duty to modify the conduct of private citizens to ensure equality for women covers attitudes that include the inferiority of women and stereotyped gender roles, which arguably encompass the animus toward gay women that motivates many men to commit corrective rape. 66% of South Africa women said they did not report their attack because they would not be taken seriously. Of these, 25% said they feared exposing their sexual orientation to the police and 22% said they were afraid of being abused by the police.

In August 2011, the Department of Justice established a National Task Team (NTT) to address the issue of hate crimes against LGBTQ people. In April 2014, then Minister of Justice Jeff Radebe launched a National Intervention Strategy for the LGBTI Sector developed by the NTT to address sex-based violence and gender-based violence against members of the community. The NTT has established a rapid response team to attend to unsolved criminal cases as a matter of urgency and produced an information pamphlet with frequently asked questions about LGBTI people. Radebe stated that the Department of Justice acknowledged the need for a specific legal framework for hate crimes and that the matter would be subjected to public debate.

In March 2011, there was an article published that stated that there are about 10 new cases of corrective rape a week in Cape Town. Cape Town, South Africa, specifically has 2.5 million people and since 2011, the prevalence of corrective rape has only increased.

According to gay-rights organization Triangle, the practice of "corrective rape" is widespread in South Africa. Research released in 2008 by Triangle, revealed that 86% of Black lesbians from the Western Cape said they lived in fear of sexual assault.

=== Uganda ===
Five corrective rape cases in which the victims were lesbians or transgender males were reported in Uganda between June and November 2011.

=== United States ===
In the United States, Brandon Teena (1972–1993) is a well-known victim of corrective rape (and thereafter murder) for being a trans man. The book All She Wanted (1996) and the two films The Brandon Teena Story (1998) and Boys Don't Cry (1999) were about him.

=== Zimbabwe ===
A U.S. State Department report on Zimbabwe states, "In response to social pressure, some families reportedly subjected their [LGBTQ] members to corrective rape and forced marriages to encourage heterosexual conduct. Such crimes were rarely reported to police. Women, in particular, were subjected to rape by male family members." Following the publication of an earlier report with similar wording, Zimbabwean journalist Angus Shaw said that lesbian women are raped by men to make them "enjoy" heterosexual acts and gay men are raped by women to "remove" their sexual orientation tendencies.

== Impact on victims ==
Corrective rape and other accompanying acts of violence can result in physical and psychological trauma, mutilation, unwanted pregnancy, and may contribute to suicide. Corrective rape is a major contributor to HIV infection in South African lesbians. In South Africa, approximately 10% of lesbians are HIV positive, with corrective rape being the most likely cause. HIV in South Africa is an epidemic, and due to homophobia, there is a lack of education about sexually transmitted diseases among lesbians. Homophobic laws and discrimination in South Africa contribute to the poor quality of health care for minorities.

The psychological effects of corrective rape on victims can be detrimental. Many victims in countries such as South Africa and India where corrective rape is most prevalent suffer from a strong sense of insecurity and disempowerment due to strong homophobia in their communities. However, violence against the LGBTQ community in South Africa is seldom reported. Many survivors of corrective rape suffer from triple discrimination for being women, Black, and homosexual. This is especially true in South African townships, where corrective rape is common for lesbian women. Corrective rape victims may suffer from depression, anxiety, and/or post-traumatic stress disorder. Due to racial and sexual discrimination in health care, victims must often deal with these issues on their own.

Again, in countries like Nigeria where the Same-Sex Marriage (Prohibition) Act, 2013 (SSMPA) "prohibits a marriage contract or civil union entered into between persons of the same sex...", lesbian, gay, bisexual, asexual and transgender people who are raped and targeted do not have the protection of the police and cannot report rape crimes done to them, as the police are likely to legitimize the abuse. Reports of corrective rape are cloaked in stigma and embarrassment so they remain largely underreported. Apart from this being a violation of the fundamental right to protection as stated in the Violence Against Persons (Prohibition) Act 2015, this sexual discrimination poses a threat to the general health of homosexual people who are victims of rape as they also fear the intolerance and disregard from medical providers, leaving them susceptible to STIs and HIV.

== Campaigning and activism ==
Child sponsorship charity ActionAid has published an article discussing corrective rape, and see ending violence against women as a pivotal part of their mission. The group joined with 26 gay and women's rights and community groups, to organize a campaign focused on South Africa but also aimed at the international community, to raise awareness of the issues. The campaign was dedicated to raising awareness about the rape and murder of two lesbian women in a Johannesburg township and called for sexual orientation to be specifically recognised as grounds for protection by police and justice systems.

Ndumie Funda, a South African Social Justice Activist, started her work to end corrective rape by launching a social campaign on Change.org in hopes to have the South African Government recognize hate crimes committed due to biases against sexual orientation and provide protection for victims. This particular petition ended up gathering almost 200 thousand signatures from individuals making up over 175 countries, forcing the government to recognize this issue. The government agreed to meet Funda and in 2014 South Africa passed its first law against hate crimes.

== See also ==
- Causes of sexual violence – Theories attempting to explain sexual violence
- Conversion therapy – Pseudoscientific attempts to change sexual orientation or gender identity
- Forced marriage of LGBTQ people
- Rape culture – Society in which rape is pervasive and normalised
- Rape statistics – Statistics on rape and other sexual assaults
- Sexual assault of LGBTQ persons
- Sex and the law – Regulation by law of human sexual activity
- Sexual violence in South Africa
- Transphobia – Anti-transgender prejudice
- Types of rape – Various types of this form of sexual assault
- V-coding – Causing rape of trans prisoners for social control
- Violence against LGBTQ people
