= Xipu =

Xipu may refer to:

- Xipu Town (Zhangzhou), town of Dongshan County, Fujian, China
- Rolly Xipu (born 1952), South African boxer
