= Ekurhuleni FM =

Community radio station based in South Africa

Ekurhuleni FM, previously known as East Rand Stereo was a community radio station based in Springs, Gauteng, South Africa. It was broadcasts on the 93.9 FM radio frequency across the East Rand and Ekurhuleni area.

The station was one of the first to go on air on 1 November 1995, during the birth of community radio in South Africa in the early 1990s.

== History ==
The station was founded as East Rand Stereo and initially broadcast from a studio in Casseldale Springs with a small reception area. Its first license was granted for three and a half days a week, sharing its 93.9 FM frequency with another community radio station.

It received a license in 1999 to broadcast seven days a week, 24 hours a day. In 2004 they became one of the first community radio stations to receive a permanent four-year license, and in 2009 the station received its new converted permanent class license under the new Electronic Communication Act, which replaced all previous broadcasting acts.

Its current studio in located in Springs Mall.

== Location ==
Ekurhuleni FM operates primarily from their studio offices in Springs Mall. The address is: Shop U18 Springs Mall, 19 Jan Smuts Rd, Selection Park, Springs, 1559

They also have a secondary studio in Emperors Palace, Kempton Park.

== Broadcast area ==
Ekurhuleni FM currently broadcasts from Springs and supplies local entertainment and news to most parts of Ekurhuleni, also known as the East Rand. Areas currently covered include Springs, Brakpan, Benoni, Parts of Boksburg, Parts of Kempton Park, Parts of Germiston and Parts of Alberton.

They also have various streaming services for listeners outside of this range.

== Music selection ==
Ekurhuleni FM is well known for its variety and fun-to-listen-to music selection, day and night and also broadcasts various focused programs such as Gospel, Country, Boeremusiek and Classical Music

== Outside Broadcast Units ==
Ekurhuleni FM is proud to be one of few community radio stations to operate an Outside Broadcast Unit. Their outside Outside broadcast studio is available for event and corporate promotions across Ekurhuleni, This unit is a well-known attraction in the area.

== Playout and transmission ==
In 2005 Ekurhuleni FM once again became a leader in the industry, when it became the first community radio station in South Africa to broadcast using RCS (Radio Computer Software), which was in the past only used by Larger Commercial Radio Stations.

Ekurhuleni FM utilizes G-Selector music scheduling and Zetta playout software from Radio Computing Services (RCS).

Ekurhuleni FM broadcasts on the 93.9 MHz Radio Frequency

== Awards ==
Ekurhuleni FM is the proud recipient of the 2007 VONK Music Award for its outstanding support towards the Afrikaans music industry of South Africa. They also won an award in 2007 from ABC Ulwazi for producing and broadcasting outstanding educational programming on HIV and AIDS and won a 2008 SABC News Award for its Afrikaans News.

== Broadcast time ==
- 24/7

== See also ==
- Lists of radio stations in Africa
- List of radio stations in South Africa
