= Haydn Smith =

South African cricketer

Personal information
- Full name: Haydn Michael Smith
- Born: 3 January 1973 (age 53); Springs, Transvaal, South Africa
- Batting: Left-handed
- Bowling: Slow left-arm orthodox

Domestic team information
- Years: Team
- 1992/93–1994/95: Western Transvaal
- 2004: Hertfordshire

Career statistics
Competition	First-class	List A
Matches	8	1
Runs scored	210	4
Batting average	16.15	4.00
100s/50s	–/–	–/–
Top score	37*	4
Balls bowled	510	0
Wickets	4	–
Bowling average	59.75	–
5 wickets in innings	–	–
10 wickets in match	–	–
Best bowling	2/63	–
Catches/stumpings	8/–	1/–
- Source: Cricinfo, 8 July 2019

Haydn Michael Smith (born 3 January 1973) is a South African former first-class cricketer.

Smith was born at Springs in Transvaal Province in January 1973. He made his debut in first-class cricket for Western Transvaal against Griqualand West at Potchefstroom in the 1992-93 UCB Bowl. He played first-class cricket for Western Transvaal until 1994, making a total of eight appearances. In these matches, he scored 210 runs at an average of 16.15, with a high score of 37 not out. With his slow left-arm orthodox bowling, he took 4 wickets with best figures of 2 for 63. Smith also made a single appearance in List A one-day cricket for Western Transvaal against Natal in the 1994–95 Benson and Hedges Series. He later played minor counties cricket in England for Hertfordshire in 2004, making four appearances in the Minor Counties Championship and a single appearance in the MCCA Knockout Trophy.
