= Springs, South Africa =

Place in Gauteng, South Africa

Springs Spriengs in Afrikaans orthography
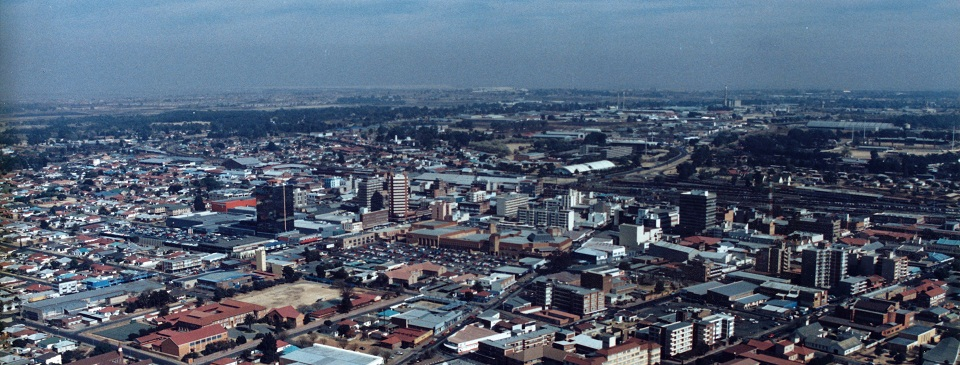
- Downtown Springs Skyline

- Location within Gauteng Location within South Africa
- Coordinates: 26°15′17″S 28°26′34″E
- Country: South Africa
- Province: Gauteng
- Municipality: Ekurhuleni
- Established: 1904

Area
  - Total: 183.50 km^{2} (70.85 sq mi)
- Elevation: 1,627 m (5,338 ft)

Population (2011)
  - Total: 121,610
  - Density: 662.72/km^{2} (1,716.4/sq mi)

Racial makeup (2011)
  - Black African: 57.5%
  - Coloured: 1.4%
  - Indian/Asian: 4.4%
  - White: 36.2%
  - Other: 0.5%

First languages (2011)
  - Afrikaans: 30.2%
  - Zulu: 20.6%
  - English: 15.7%
  - Northern Sotho: 8.0%
  - Other: 25.4%
- Time zone: UTC+2 (SAST)
- Postal code (street): 1559; 1576; 1578
- PO box: 1555–1559; 1560–1575; 1577–1579
- Area code: 011

Springs is a former independent city that is now part of the City of Ekurhuleni, based in the east of Johannesburg (East Rand), in Gauteng Province, South Africa. It lies 50 km (31 mi) east of Johannesburg and 72 km (45 mi) southeast from Pretoria. Its name is probably derived from the large number of springs in the area, and its estimated population is more than 121,610 in 2011. It is situated at 1,628 m (5,341 ft) above sea level.

During the apartheid-era, the city was racially segregated under the Group Areas Act. These consisted of middle and upper-income white suburbs around the city centre and the Indian area of Bakerton east of the CBD. A community of black Africans were living in a "black spot" of Springs known as Payneville. The Town Council ordered the creation of a new black township to relieve overcrowding in Payneville. In the 1950s, the residents were forcibly removed and relocated to the newly created, KwaThema, southwest of the CBD.

Springs has a high concentration of Art Deco architecture. After Miami in Florida, it has the highest number of small-scale Art Deco buildings in the world.

Nadine Gordimer (1923–2014), the first South African Nobel Laureate in Literature (1991), was born and raised in Springs.

== History ==
Springs is east of Johannesburg and on the East Rand, or what is now known as the Metropolitan area of Ekurhuleni, in the Gauteng Province. It was founded as a coal and gold mining town in 1904.

From about 1840, new settlers declared farms for themselves, especially after the Zuid-Afrikaansche Republiek (South African Republic, later Transvaal) became an independent republic with the signing of the Sand River Convention in 1852. These initial farms were large, but the measurements of the borders were inaccurate, and later, when the correct borders of the farms had to be documented, there were several extra or odd pieces of land that did not belong to any farm. These odd pieces of land then became state property. Three neighbouring farms on the Witwatersrand, namely Geduld (meaning 'patience'), De Rietfontein ('the reed fountain') and Brakpan (literally, 'small, brackish lake'), qualified.

The 685 ha odd piece was given the name 'The Springs' by the land surveyor James Brooks, probably because of all the fountains on the land. Another story is that he wanted to name it after himself, but because his name (Brooks) resembled the Afrikaans word 'broek' (trousers) so closely, he feared that the Afrikaans farmers in the area would mock it.

On 16 September 1884 the official map of The Springs was registered in Pretoria, the Republic's capital. Initially, the land's value was equal to R200, but the discovery of coal and gold and its subsequent mining increased the value considerably.

In 1888 the first contract was signed to mine coal in the Springs. Initially mining was on a small scale, but rose when the Great Eastern Mine was established. At that time there were a number of corrugated iron houses around the mine and a few small hotels and general dealers. In 1902 a health committee was appointed to look after the building and location of structures and hygiene in the growing township. In 1904 the Grootvlei Proprietary Mines were registered and shafts were sunk. This followed the discovery in 1899 of gold on the farm Geduld and the further discovery of the main reef in 1902.

In April 1904, The Springs was proclaimed a town, called Springs, the health committee replaced by a town council, and it flourished as a mining town. In 1962, Springs produced 10% of the country's gold and 9% of its uranium. However, by the end of the 1960s the last mine in town, the Daggafonteinmyn, (literally: Marijuana fountain mine) was emptied. In response, the town developed into an industrial centre.

The original 7 km^{2} farm on which the city of Springs was later to be built, The Springs, was surveyed in 1883. Coal was discovered in the area in 1887 and three years later in 1890–1891, the Transvaal Republic's first railway, the Randtram Line, was built by the Netherlands-South African Railway Company (NZASM) to carry coal from the East Rand coalfields to the gold mines of the Witwatersrand.

Gradually, especially after coal was discovered further east in South Africa in Witbank, the Springs collieries were closed. In the meanwhile, however, gold had also been discovered in the area. A village was laid out in 1904 and in 1908 the first gold mining began. Springs was granted municipal status in 1912. By the late 1930s, there were eight gold mines near Springs, making it the largest single gold-producing area in the world.

Springs is currently one of the industrial centers of the Witwatersrand and also the Eastern Gateway of Gauteng towards Mpumalanga and Northern Kwazulu Natal. Mining has been replaced by manufacturing and engineering industries of economic importance; products of the region include processed metals, chemicals, paper and foodstuffs.

== Geography ==
=== Communities ===
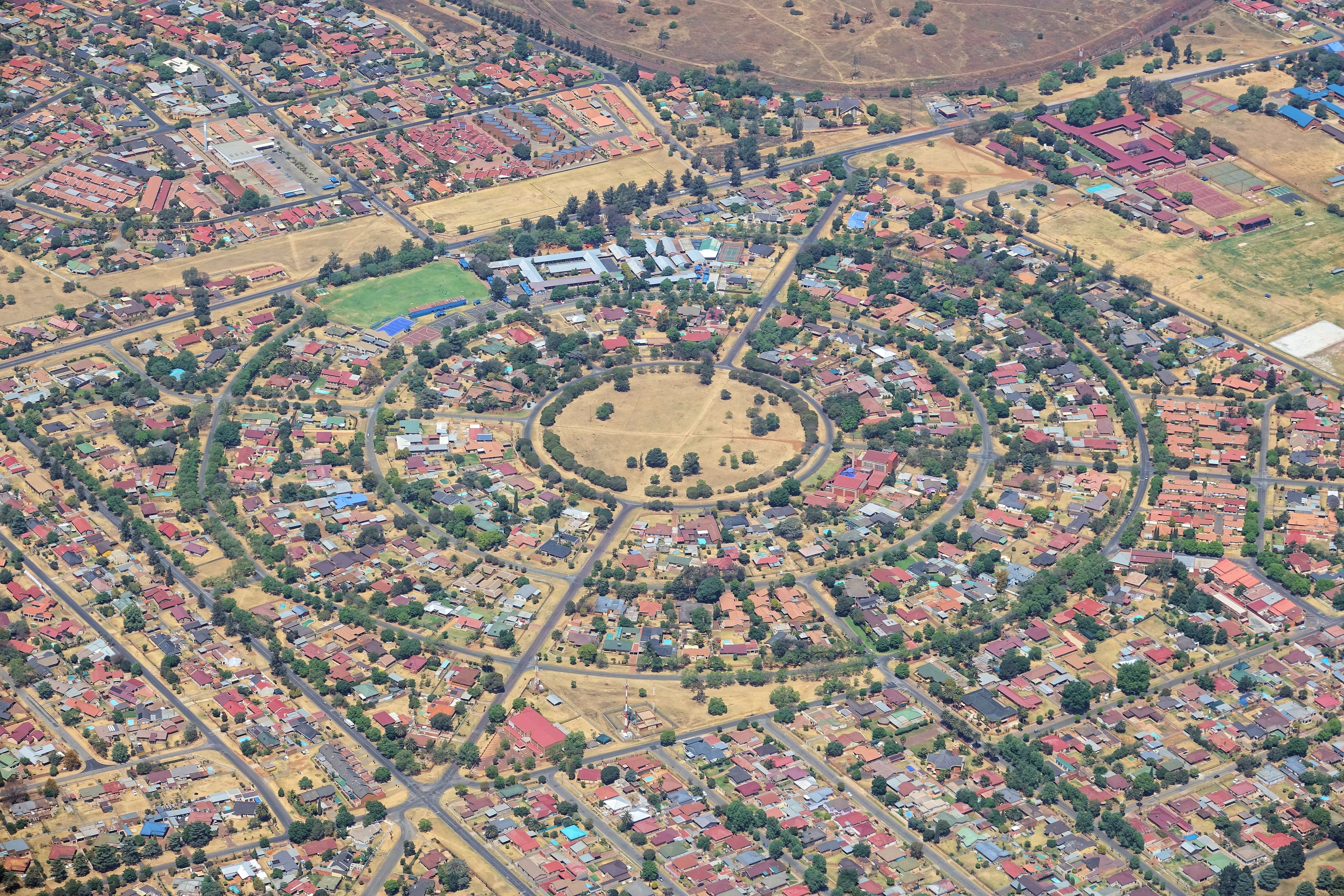
The centre of Geduld-Extension suburb

The following are the main suburbs of Springs:

- Modder East (Eastvale)
- Dersley
- Presidents Dam
- Presidents Ranch
- Krugersrus
- New State Areas
- Krugersrus Ext
- Rowhill
- Petersfield
- Petersfield Ext
- Paul Krugersoord
- East Geduld
- Geduld
- Geduld Ext
- Springs Ext
- Springs CBD
- Lodeyko
- Welgedacht
- Holfontein
- Persida
- Welgedag Small Holdings
- Everest
- Gugulethu
- Slovo Park
- Slovo Park East
- Bakerton
- Strubenvale
- Strubenvale Ext
- Grootvlei
- Great Valley
- Casseldale
- Palmiet Kuil
- Largo
- Aston Lake
- Edelweiss
- Edelweiss Ext
- Daggafontein
- Daggafontein Ext
- Selection Park North
- Selection Park South
- Selcourt
- Struisbult
- Pollak Park
- Wright Park
- Reedville
- Dal Fouche
- KwaThema
- Payneville

=== Architecture and monuments ===
Springs is known for its high concentration of Art Deco architecture, as it is home to the second-highest number of small scale Art Deco buildings in the world, after Miami, Florida. These Art Deco buildings were mostly constructed in the CBD during the interwar period, during the greatest growth period in the city. The style of architecture was employed to "counteract the incipient provincialism associated with a colonial city." In 1998, Micha Birch, then a member of the National Monuments Council, approached the municipality about arranging an exhibition of the city's Art Deco architecture. Art Deco examples include the Central Fire Station, built in 1938. A number are also known for their graphic artwork and letter work, notably seen in the Court Chambers, Renesta House, Palladium Cinema and Nureef House. In 2023, Barbara Adair published In the Shadow of the Springs I Saw, with photographs and stories of Art Deco buildings in Springs and their inhabitants.

Other landmarks include several monuments, including the War Monument, the war cemetery (for soldiers who died in the Second World War), the Old Springs Fire Station, and the now-derelict Dutch Windmill in the former Martiens Kotze (Pioneer) Park.

Other notable buildings include the Ken Gampu Theatre (formerly Springs Civic Theatre) and the now-demolished Mudhook Hall.

In 2021, a private initiative to restore various local military memorials was undertaken. The Springs War Memorial was one of those restored in the initiative. In 2023, the derelict MOTH (Men with Tin Hats) Memorial in 1st Avenue Geduld, under the direction of Tony da Cruz, was also restored.

A new Mine and Military Museum (MMM) was also founded in 2023 to restore and display South African historical artifacts. It exhibits artillery pieces, including ones from Joubert Park, Johannesburg, Ermelo and Durban, and airforce aircraft, such as Impala, Mirage and Puma helicopters.

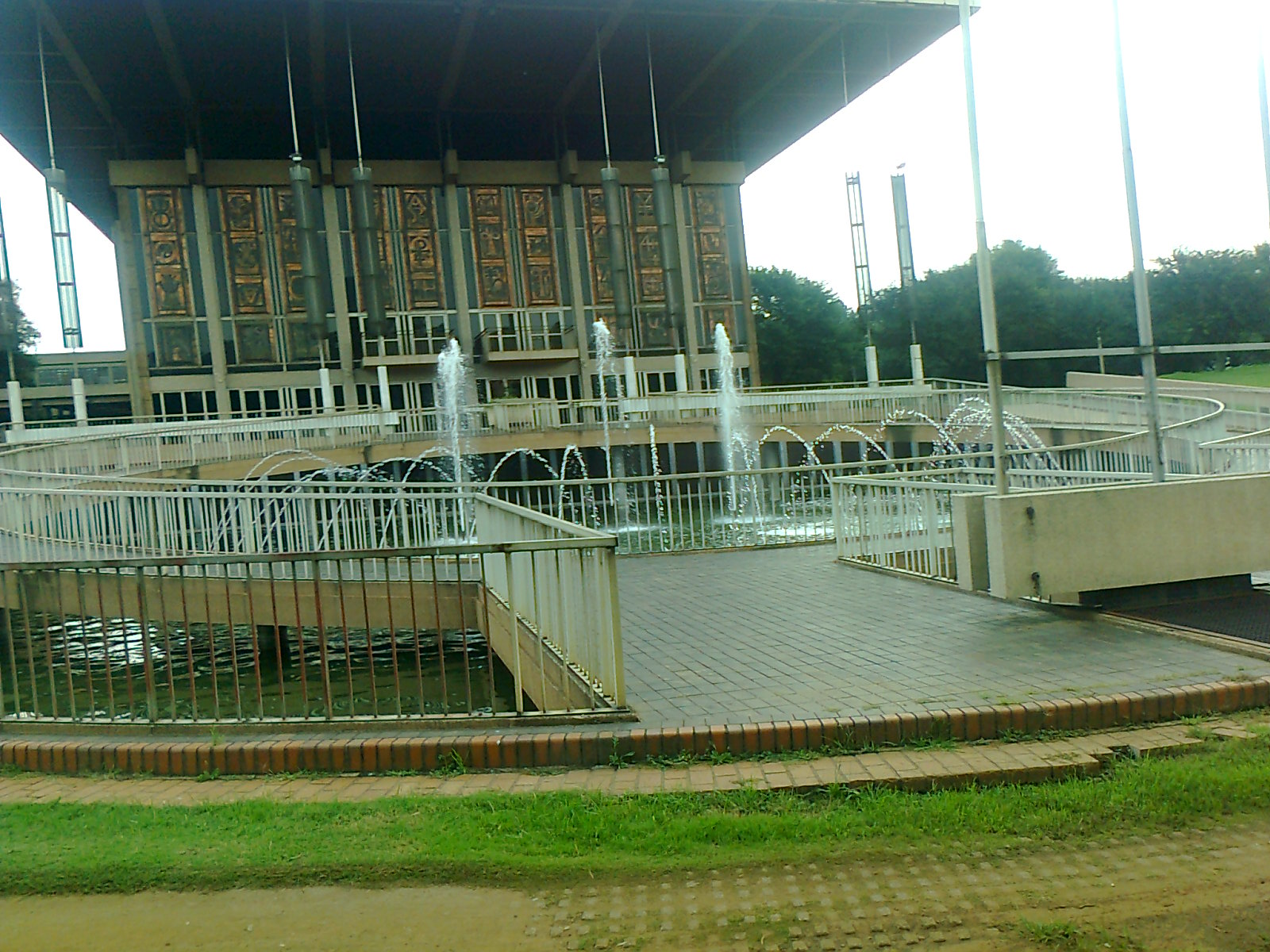
Front of City Hall

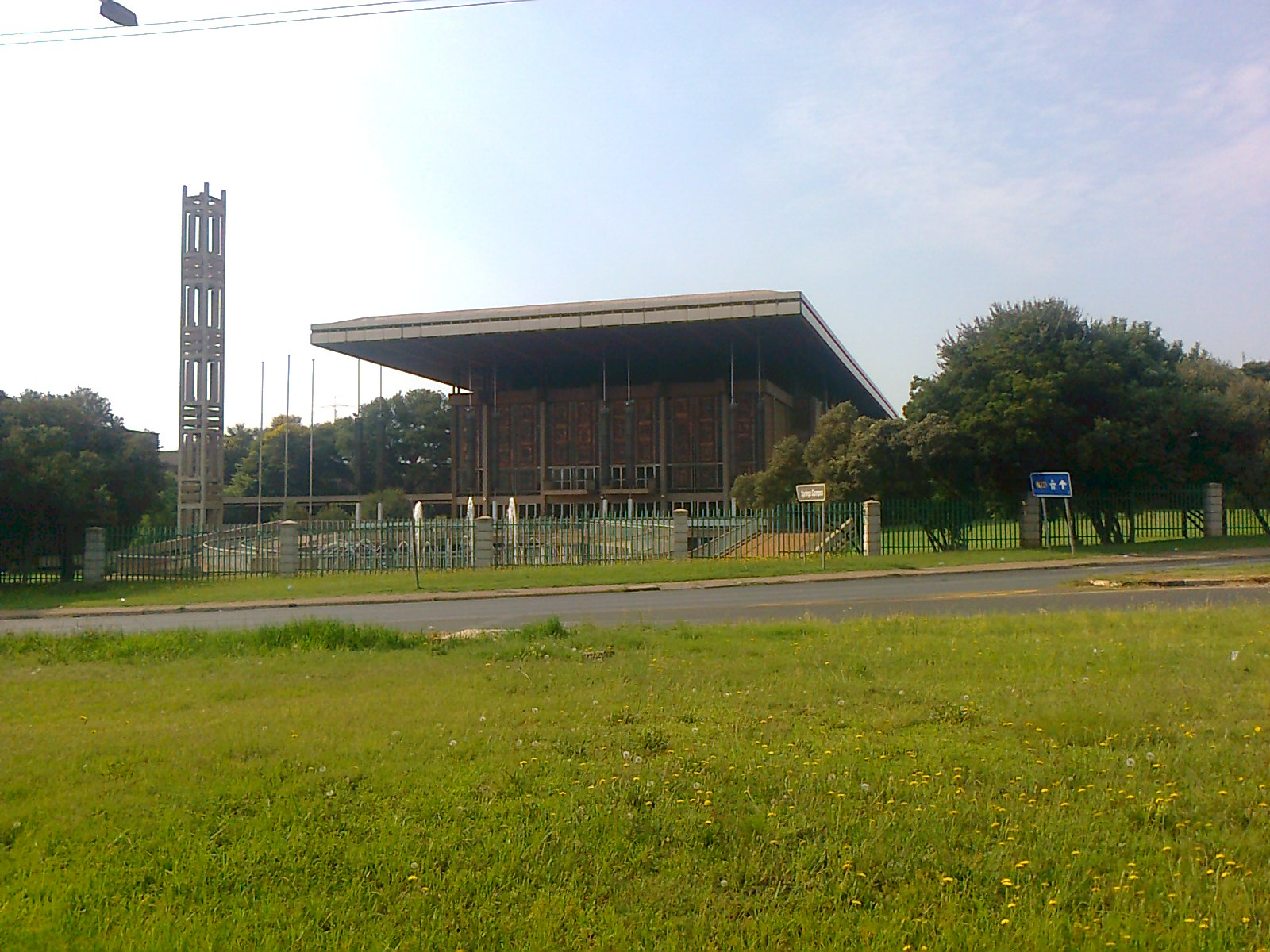
Side of City Hall

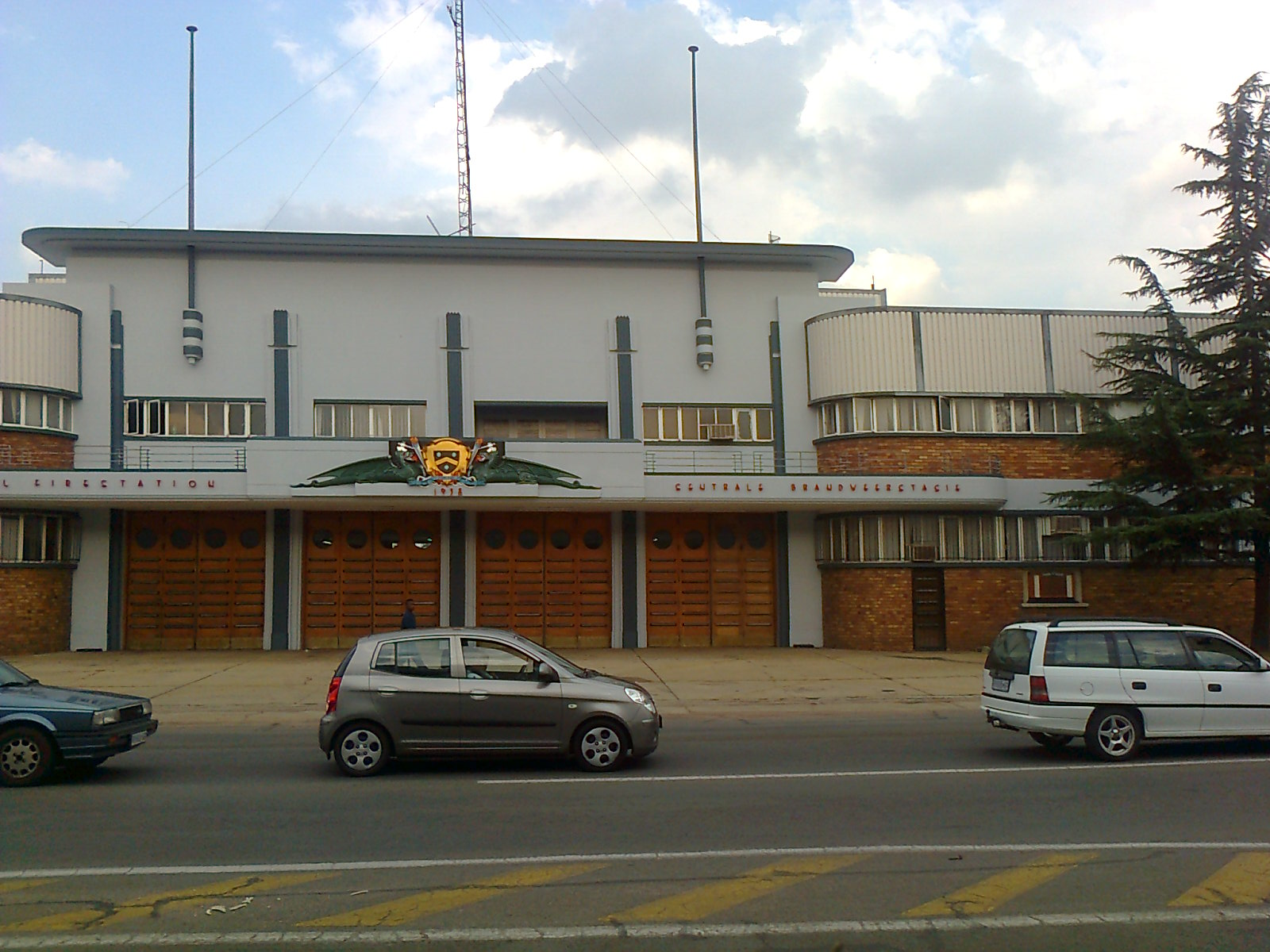
Art Deco Fire Station

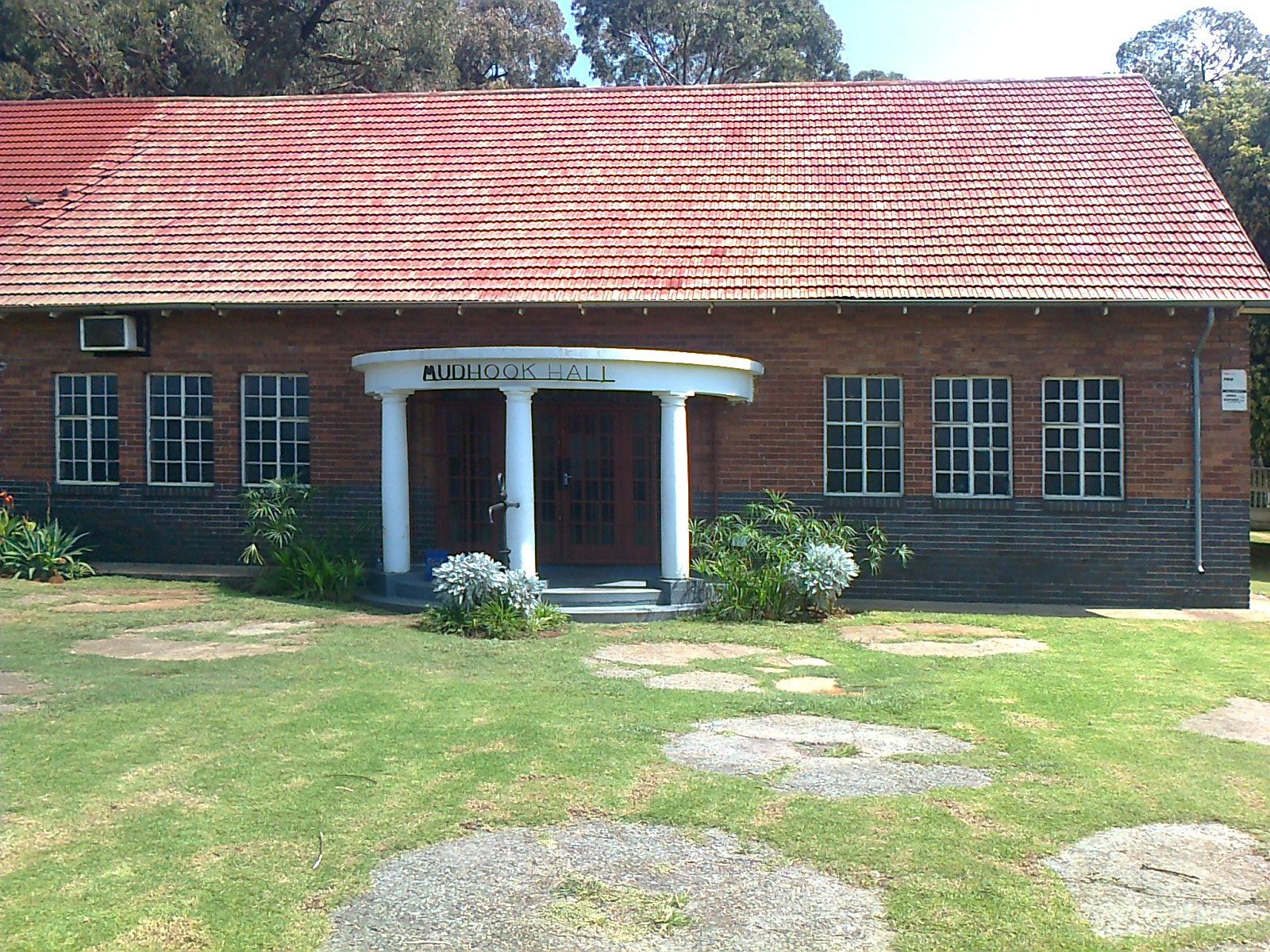
Mudhook Hall

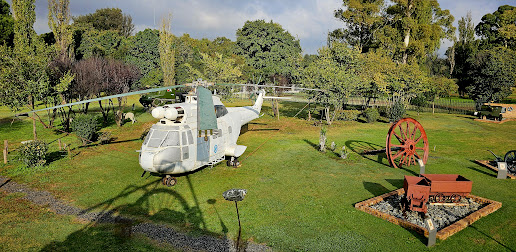
Puma military helicopter at the MMM

=== Climate ===
Springs has a typical sub-tropical climate with four distinct seasons.

Spring is warm to hot with some afternoon showers. Spring usually starts to show during the latter half of August, although it is officially springtime in September.

Summer is hot, with afternoon thunder showers early in the season, and drier during January and February, the two hottest months. The average high during summer is 32 °C (90 °F), and the average low is 15 °C (59 °F), although it can go as high as 37 °C (99 °F). A record high of 40 °C (104 °F) has been recorded.

Autumn is generally cooler, starting with late rains early in the season. Cold set in towards winter, with the first frost in late autumn. At times, the first signs of autumn can be seen in late February.

Winter is very cold, with severe frost and very occasional snow, the coldest months being July and August. August is usually a very windy month, continuing into early spring in September with sandstorms and strong winds. The average high during winter is 10 °C (50 °F), and the average low is – 5 °C (41 °F). Temperatures can drop to – 10 °C (50 °F), and a record low of −15 °C (5 °F) has been recorded.

The average rainfall in Springs is 450 mm (18 in) per annum.

=== Flora and fauna ===
Springs is part of the Highveld grassland vegetation area, which consists of the southern half of Gauteng, Western Mpumalanga, the southeastern parts of the Limpopo province, most of the Freestate, Northern Eastern Cape, and the southeastern parts of Northwest and Eastern Northern Cape.

Springs is mostly grassland, with short grass with some smaller succulent plants such as the aloe. The plough-breaker, which is unique on the Highveld, can also be found in the area. The wetland areas in Springs has an area of 17 km^{2} (6.6 sq mi), fed by the Blesbokspruit and Lesser Blesbokspruit, with concomitant water plants and trees growing nearby.

The Blesbokspruit Wetland Region in Springs draws over 300 species of birds, including the great flamingo, Egyptian Goose, barn owl, blue crane, guineafowl, secretary-bird and the ostrich. Water mammals such as the otter and lesser otter have been observed in less populated areas. The blesbok, mongoose, reed buck, read jackal, black wildebeest, springbok, mountain zebra, the porcupine and other mammals are to be found, but usually within reserve areas.

Various species of reptiles such as the rinkhals, puffadder brown house snake, aurora house snake and various lizards, including the giant girdled lizard, and the African bullfrog are also to be found in wetland areas of Springs.

== Demographics ==
=== Jewish community ===
Up until the late 1990s, Springs had a vibrant Jewish community. There were two synagogues, with a total of 300 families. By 2015, most of the community had left for Johannesburg, Cape Town, or further afield like Israel, Australia, the US and the UK. The community's last rabbi was the Manchester-born Rabbi Yossi Liberow. The synagogue building, Springs Shul, still stands, but by 2015 operated as an Acts Church.

The town's first synagogue, Springs Gates of Hope Synagogue, was consecrated on 3 May 1908 and extended in 1933. Due to the growing membership, the original synagogue was demolished and the new synagogue, known as the Springs Shul, opened in September 1951.

In the 1940s, a Reform synagogue, Temple Emeth, (later Temple Emet) was designed by the architect, Harold Le Roith. The synagogue closed in the 1990s.

The Nobel Prize-winning Jewish writer, Nadine Gordimer was raised in Springs. Her father was a member of a local synagogue and attended Yom Kippur services.

== Economy ==
Springs is an economic hub in Ekurhuleni, with industries including manufacturing, commerce, service, hospitality, mining and service providing companies.

=== Mining ===
Historically, Springs was known as a mining centre for gold and coal. Springs is still one of the gold mining centers in South Africa, which includes Gold One, Modder East Operation, the Geduld Mine, East Geduld Mine and the Daggafontein and East Daggafontein mines. New coal mines towards the east of the city are being developed.

=== Manufacturing ===
Springs is one of the industrial centres in Gauteng, and is served by four industrial suburbs: New Era, Nuffield, Enstra and Fulcrum. There are smaller industrial areas at Dersley, Daggafontein, Selection Park, Selcourt and Strubenvale. The only Kelloggs factory in South Africa is situated in Springs. Springs is also home to Impala Platinum's precious and base metal refineries as well as PFG Building Glass, the only producer of float glass on the continent. Zincor, the only zinc producer in Africa, was also located here; its refinery used to produce all South Africa's requirement of this metal, but ceased its production operations in 2011 due to various economic reasons. Springs is also home to Sappi Enstra Mill, the only paper mill plant in Southern Africa and only paper mill plant in the world that is not next to a river.

== Parks ==
Springs has about 120 parks, the most well-known being Presidents Park, where there is horse jumping, and Murray Park, which has a caravan site next to the Alexander Dam. There is also Frikkie Deysel Park in Petersfield, Butler Park in Geduld, George Sutter Park in Selection Park, and the Park of Dersley in Dersley Park. In Northeastern Springs, the Blesbokspruit Wetland Reserve has a great diversity of birds and plants. Springs also has a Game Reserve near the CBD and the Dutch-styled Pioneer Park next to the Springs CBD.

== Education ==
There are several schools, ranging from pre-primary to secondary schools, and a tertiary college in Springs.

=== Primary ===
- Bakerton Primary School
- Creative Education Centre (Nursery and Primary School)
- Job Maseko Primary School
- KwaThema Primary School
- Laerskool Christiaan Beyers
- Laerskool Jan van Riebeeck
- Laerskool Morester
- Laerskool PAM Brink
- Laerskool Selection Park
- Laerskool Welgedag
- Laerskool Werda
- Montessori School (nursery and grades 1–3)
- Pinegrove Primary School
- PLG Springs Academy (Pre-Primary and Primary School)
- Selcourt Primary School
- Selpark Primary School
- Strubenvale Primary School
- Umbila Primary Farm School
- Veritas College Preparatory School
- Vukucinge Primary Farm School
- Zithembeni Primary School

=== Secondary ===
- Eureka High School
- Hoërskool Dr Johan Jurgens High School
- Hoer Tegniese Skool Springs
- Hoerskool Hugenote
- Jameson High School
- Springs Boys' High School
- Springs Girls' High School
- Springs Secondary School
- Veritas College – Springs
- The Keep Learning Centre
- Kenneth Masekela Secondary School
- Zimisele High School

=== Further and higher ===
- Ekurhuleni East College, Springs Campus

=== Combined ===
Combined schools offer primary and secondary, and sometimes pre-primary reception.

- Olympia Park School
- Dr. WK. Du Plessis School
- Phelang
- Protea School
- Springs Muslim School
- Veritas College
- PLG Springs Academy

== Media ==
The Springs Advertiser (a newspaper) covers the whole of the greater Springs area, including KwaThema. The African Reporter, another newspaper, covers KwaThema, Tsakane in Brakpan, and Duduza. Springs is also served by a local radio station, the East Rand Stereo (on a frequency of 93.9 FM), which covers the whole of Ekurhuleni Metro, eastern parts of Johannesburg, Heidelberg, Delmas, Secunda in Mpumalanga, Leandra, and Devon in Eastern Gauteng; it has over 300,000 listeners. East Rand Stereo operates from its headquarters in Springs, following some satellite studios that had been opened in Brakpan, Benoni and Boksburg.

== Infrastructure ==
=== Transportation ===
==== Road transportation ====
Springs is served by two national highways, namely the N12 to the north and the N17 to the south.

The N12 is an east–west freeway passing north of Springs, connecting it with Witbank in the east and with Johannesburg in the west. The N17 is an east–west freeway passing just south of the Springs CBD, connecting it with Leandra, Bethal and Ermelo in the east and with Johannesburg in the west.

Springs is also served by four provincial and regional routes, namely the R29, R51, R554 and the R555. The R29 is an east–west provincial route which connects Springs with Benoni in the north-west and with Leandra in the east. The north–south R51 connects Springs with Daveyton and Bapsfontein in the north and with Nigel and Balfour in the south. The R554 regional route connects Springs with Alberton and Johannesburg South in the west and the R555 regional route connects Springs with Delmas, Witbank and Middelburg in the north-east.

==== Railway transportation ====
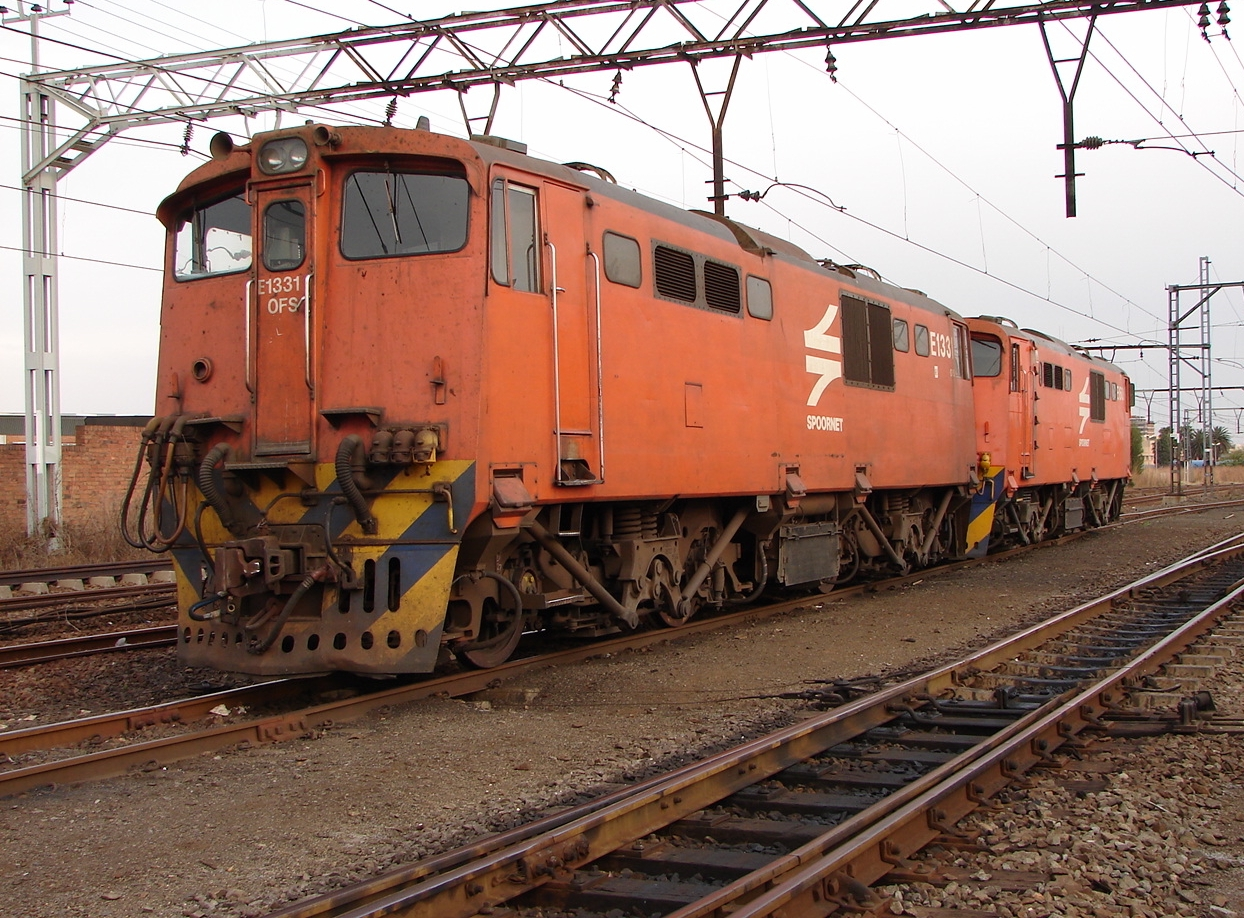
Transnet Freight Rail Station, Welgedag, Springs

Springs is a subhub for the Metrorail Gauteng, with the Springs-Johannesburg trains serving Springs, Brakpan, Benoni, Boksburg, Germiston and Johannesburg. Springs also have the Springs Nigel Line serving Springs and Nigel. Springs is also a major hub for Transnet Freight Rail with goods and cargo carriers trains from the Springs, Welgedag and Daggafontein stations connecting Springs with Johannesburg, Ermelo, Witbank, Nelspruit, Pretoria, Vereeniging, Klerksdorp, Richards Bay, Durban, Bloemfontein, Pietersburg, Lesotho and Rustenburg. Transported items include wood, coal, petroleum, ammonia, and cement.

=== Health systems ===
Springs is served by the Far East Rand Provincial Hospital and three private hospitals: N17 Hospital, St. Mary Women's Hospital, and Parkland Hospital. Springs has many clinics, including the White City and KwaThema clinics in KwaThema, the Painville clinic, and the Springs clinic, which is operated under the Springs Service Delivery as a municipal clinic under the Ekurhuleni Metropolitan Council. There is a medical laboratory at the Parklands Hospital, Springs.

== Notable people ==
- Brandon Auret (born 27 December 1972), an actor on stage (Winnie), television (Isidingo, Angel's Song, One Way, Breathe), and film (Catch a Fire, Hansie – The Movie, District 9, Night Drive, The Race-ist, Elysium), rock singer, and songwriter, was born and raised in Springs and attended the local CBC (now Veritas College).
- Ernest George Bock (17 September 1908 – 5 September 1961), a South African cricket player in one test (1935/1936), who once held one of the top Currie Cup bowling averages and was also a Griqualand West cricket and rugby player, relocated from Kimberley, Northern Cape, to Springs.
- Rudi Bryson (born 25 July 1968), a former South African cricketer who played seven One Day Internationals in 1997, and played for Northern Transvaal and Eastern Province cricket teams, was born and raised in Springs, and attended Springs Boys' High School.
- Roger Joyce Bushell, RAF (30 August 1910 – 29 March 1944), a Springs-born British lawyer and Auxiliary Air Force pilot, organised and led the famous escape from the Nazi prisoner of war camp, Stalag Luft III in 1944.
- Fiona Coyne (22 June 1965 – 18 August 2010), a theatre actress, playwright, writer, and television presenter (The Weakest Link, South Africa), was born, raised, and married in Springs, and attended the Springs Convent school (now Veritas College).
- Koos du Plessis (10 May 1945 – 15 January 1984), a South African singer-songwriter and poet, was born in Rustenburg, and grew up in Springs, attending PAM Brink Primary School and High School Hugenote.
- Angelique Gerber (born 16 April 1983), South African actress.
- Nadine Gordimer (20 November 1923 – 13 July 2014), the first South African Nobel Laureate in Literature (1991) and recipient of the 1974 Booker Prize, was born in Springs and attended the local Our Lady of Mercy Convent school (now known as Veritas College).
- Dean Hall (born 2 September 1977), a former Springbok rugby, Lions rugby, and Sharks rugby player (winger), and once dubbed "the white Jonah Lomu" by the New Zealand media, was born and raised in Springs and attended Springs Boys' High School.
- Penny Heyns (born 8 November 1974), double Olympic gold medallist in swimming (1996 Atlanta Olympic Games), holder of 14 swimming world records, and the only woman in history to complete the Olympic double of winning both the 100 and 200-metre breaststroke, was born in Springs and attended a local primary school.
- Job Maseko (died 7 March 1952), World War II prisoner of war and namesake of the Job Maseko Primary School in KwaThema, Springs. He was a member of the Native Military Corps and was awarded the Military Medal for sinking an enemy steamer that was moored in Tobruk Harbour.
- Frew McMillan (born 20 May 1942), former world tennis player and tennis commentator was born in Springs.
- Japie Mulder (Jacobus Cornelius Mulder) (born 18 October 1969), is a former South African rugby union player who played for South Africa between 1994 and 2001. He attended Hoërskool Hugenote, Springs.
- Madi Phala (2 February 1955 – 2 March 2007), well-known artist, designer, and educator, was born and raised in KwaThema, Springs.
- James Phillips (22 January 1959 – 31 July 1995), a South African rock singer, songwriter and performer, grew up in Springs.
- Justine Robbeson (born 15 May 1985), former world junior heptathlon champion (2004), current African record holder in the women's javelin (63.49m in February 2008), and participant in the 2008 Beijing Olympic Games, grew up in Springs and attended Springs Girls' High School.
- Lawrence Sephaka (born 8 August 1978), a Springbok rugby player (prop) from 2001 to 2006 gaining 24 caps and playing in the 2003 Rugby World Cup, former Lions rugby player, and current professional player for Rugby Pro D2, the second level of the French professional league, for Toulon, attended Hoer Tegniese Skool in Springs.
- Eudy Simelane (11 March 1977 – 28 April 2008), a well-known former South Africa women's national football team ("Banyana Banyana") midfielder, future South African Football Association referee, and gay rights activist grew up in and was murdered in KwaThema, Springs.
- Haydn Smith (born 1973), cricketer
- Rolly Xipu (born 12 January 1952), grew up in Payneville and was a South African boxer, who fought from 1972 to 1981. Xipu held the South African lightweight title.
