= Angelique Gerber =

South African actress (born 1983)

- Born: 16 April 1983 (age 42); Johannesburg
- Notable work: 7de Laan

Angelique Gerber (born 16 April 1983) is a South African actress who was born, lives and works in Johannesburg. She attended Hoërskool Hugenote in Springs and is best known for her part in 7^{de} Laan as Clara. In the South African soap opera 7^{de} Laan, she portrays Clara, a young girl from Bucharest, Romania, who speaks broken Afrikaans and sometimes struggles to express herself properly. She also had a significant role in the 2002 Canadian film Disposable Life playing the role of Emily.

She also hosted the latest series of Boer soek 'n vrou on KykNet.
