= Nelson Dladla =

South African soccer player and manager

Personal information
- Full name: Nelson Sunduza Tutu
- Date of birth: 10 June 1954 (age 72)
- Place of birth: KwaThema, South Africa
- Position: Midfielder

Youth career
- Pilkington Young Brothers

Senior career*
Years	Team	Apps	(Gls)
1976–1988	Kaizer Chiefs	408	(125)
- * Club domestic league appearances and goals

Nelson "Teenage" Dladla (born 10 June 1954) is a retired South African former soccer player who played as a midfielder for Pilkington Young Brothers and most notably Kaizer Chiefs. During his spell at Kaizer Chiefs he wore the legendary number 11. After retiring he also worked as a manager for his former club.

== Youth career ==
As a teenager he attended Tlakula High School in KwaThema, a township east of Johannesburg and he played for a local football club called Pilkington United Brothers, commonly known as PUBS.

== Recruitment ==
On 10 August 1976, straight after training session, Ewert Nene went to Kwa-Thema to negotiate Dladla's transfer. Upon arrival at the Dladla household, Nene, who was in the company of his newest recruit to Chiefs, Jan Lechaba, sent a youngster to call Teenage from the house. As the two waited in Nene's newly bought, white BMW 518, they were confronted by three men who came storming out of Dladla's household. According to reports, the men were there to deliver cash to Dladla's mother, following a match his then team (PUBS) played the weekend before. Nene allegedly tried to drive off but one of the men (a PUBS official named Mathebula) grabbed the car keys. Fearing for their lives, Nene and Lechaba jumped out of the car and ran in different directions. Nene was chased down the street by the three men. Once they caught up with him, a 17 year old team mate of Dladla's (named Solomon Ndlovu) who was part of the chasing group pulled out a knife and stabbed Nene. According to the two adults in the chasing group, the 17 year old's actions caught them by surprise, as they prepared to address their "grievance" with Nene. Following the stabbing, the trio (Mathebula, assailant Ndlovu and another) drove Nene to the Far East Rand Hospital, using Mathebula's car. Nene was certified dead on arrival. The 17 year old handed himself to the police. He was convicted and served a 4 year sentence for culpable homicide, due his youthfulness. Questions still remain today as to the extent to which the actions of the adult men in the group could have helped abate the 17 year old's actions. This was fueled by reports that one of the men in the group (Mathebula) carried a knob-kierie during the chase. Nene's killer (Ndlovu) would come back later in the early 80's to play for PUBS, with whom he faced Dladla led Chiefs on a number of occasions.
