= Luleki Sizwe =

LGBT nonprofit in South Africa

- Formation: 2008
- Founder: Nondumiso "Ndumie" Funda
- Type: Nonprofit organization
- Purpose: Support for lesbians who have survived homophobic violence and corrective rape
- Headquarters: Cape Town, South Africa
- Region served: South Africa
- Fields: LGBT rights in South Africa, Violence against women in South Africa

Luleki Sizwe is a South African organization that supports lesbians who have survived homophobic violence and so-called corrective rape. The organization is based in the Cape Town area and works with women in township communities.

== History ==
Luleki Sizwe was founded in 2008 by Nondumiso "Ndumie" Funda. Funda founded the organization after the deaths of her friend Luleka Makiwane and her fiancée Nosizwe Nomsa Bizana, both of whom had been attacked because of their sexuality.

The name Luleki Sizwe comes from the names of Makiwane and Bizana. Funda has said the name means "discipline the nation constructively".

In 2010, Luleki Sizwe launched a petition calling on the South African government to address corrective rape as a hate crime. The New Humanitarian reported in 2011 that the petition became the most popular petition on Change.org within weeks and led the South African Ministry of Justice to contact Funda to arrange a meeting.

In 2019 that Luleki Sizwe worked with lesbians across 10 township communities in South Africa.
