= Blinkwater, KwaZulu-Natal =

Blinkwater
- Location within KwaZulu-Natal Location within South Africa
- Coordinates: 27.405°S 30.929°E
- Country: South Africa
- Province: KwaZulu-Natal
- District: Zululand
- Municipality: eDumbe

Area
  - Total: 7.84 km^{2} (3.03 sq mi)

Population (2011)
  - Total: 8,810
  - Density: 1,120/km^{2} (2,910/sq mi)

Racial makeup (2011)
  - Black African: 99.6%
  - Coloured: 0.1%
  - Indian/Asian: 0.2%
  - White: 0.1%

First languages (2011)
  - Zulu: 96.3%
  - S. Ndebele: 1.2%
  - Other: 2.5%
- Time zone: UTC+2 (SAST)
- PO box: 0931

Blinkwater is a town in eDumbe Local Municipality in the KwaZulu-Natal province of South Africa.
