= KwaThema =

KwaThema last Town
- Location within Gauteng Location within South Africa
- Coordinates: 26°17′51″S 28°24′9″E
- Country: South Africa
- Province: Gauteng
- Municipality: Ekurhuleni

Area
  - Total: 13.93 km^{2} (5.38 sq mi)

Population (2001)
  - Total: 99,517
  - Density: 7,144/km^{2} (18,500/sq mi)

Racial makeup (2001)
  - Black African: 99.7%
  - Coloured: 0.2%

First languages (2001)
  - Zulu: 56.8%
  - Sotho: 8.7%
  - Northern Sotho: 8.6%
  - Xhosa: 8.6%
  - Other: 17.3%
- Time zone: UTC+2 (SAST)

KwaThema is a township south-west of Springs in the district of Ekurhuleni, Gauteng, South Africa. It was established in 1951 when Africans were forcibly removed from Payneville because it was considered by the apartheid government to be too close to a white town. The new township's layout was designed along modernist principles and became a model for many subsequent townships, although the envisaged social facilities were not implemented. The typical South African township house, the 51/9, was one of the plans developed for KwaThema. A black local authority with municipal status was established in 1984. In 1985 KwaThema experienced violent unrest and right-wing vigilante activity.

KwaThema is a multi-racial township where most of South Africa's eleven official languages are spoken but the predominant ones are Sotho and Zulu. KwaThema has given birth to many successful individuals who have helped in the development of the town.

== History ==
KwaThema was named after Selope Thema who was a South African political activist and leader.

== Notable residents ==
- Andries Maseko (1955–2013), South African footballer
- Nelson Dladla (b. 1954), South African footballer
- Joe Mzamane (1918–1993), an Anglican priest, mayor and father of Mbulelo Mzamane
- Mbulelo Mzamane (1948–2014), a South African author, poet, and academic
- Eudy Simelane (1977–2008), South African footballer and LGBT-rights activist, raped and murdered in the town
- Lucas Sithole (1931–1994), South African sculptor
- Madi Phala (1955–2007), South African artist and designer
- Hilda Tloubatla (b. 1942), South African mbaqanga singer
- Simon "Tsipa" Skosana (1957–2009), South African bantamweight champion
- Innocent Mayoyo, South African goalkeeper
- Joe Nina (b. 1974), South African musician and producer
- Rolly Xipu (b. 1953), South African Lightweight/ Junior Welterweight Boxing Champion

== More information ==
- The KwaThema Project
