= Madi Phala =

South African artist (1955–2007)

- Born: 2 February 1955; Kwa-Thema, Springs, South Africa
- Died: 2 March 2007 (aged 52); Langa, Cape Town

Madi Phala (2 February 1955 – 2 March 2007) was a South African artist. His later works were predominantly painting and collage and dealt with the theme of the African herd boy.

== Biography ==
Phala was born 2 February 1955 in Kwa-Thema, Springs, South Africa.

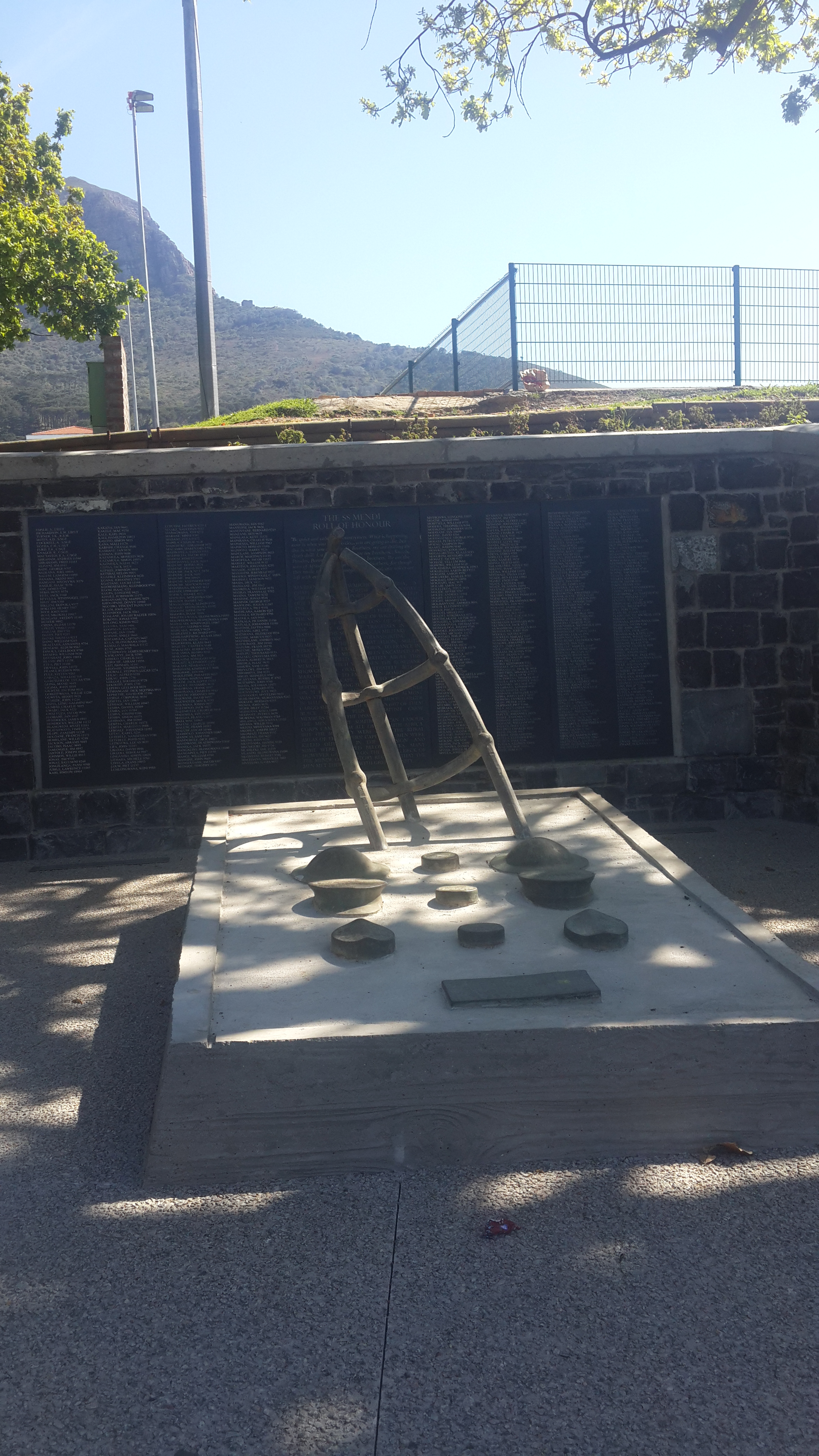
SS Mendi Memorial, University of Cape Town

Phala's work is represented in several private and corporate art collections, including the French Embassy; De Beers, London, as well as Minister Pallo Jordan and art historian Barbara Lindop. His sculpture SS Mendi Memorial, commemorating the sinking of troopship Mendi in 1917, was designated a national heritage site in 2016.

He was murdered outside his house at Langa, Cape Town on 2 March 2007 during a robbery.
