= Forced marriage of LGBTQ people =

Forced marriage of LGBTQ people occurs in many countries around the world. Unlike a lavender marriage, forced marriage of LGBTQ people is not mutually consented to. One or both of the participants are being married against their will. Forced marriage of LGBTQ people happens due to several reasons such as family pressure, honor-based abuse, and as a form of conversion therapy.

== Scope ==
According to the United Kingdom's Forced Marriage Unit, forced marriage is when a marriage is not freely entered. LGBTQ people may enter mutually beneficial marriages of convenience or choose to enter marriages arranged by their family, but these practices are not the same as forced marriage. Forced marriage is performed without the willingness and valid consent of one or both of the participants. Someone may be coerced into a forced marriage through emotional pressure, violence, threats, or other forms of abuse.

Forced marriage is a human rights abuse, domestic abuse, and a form of gender-based violence. It can also be a form of child abuse if one or both participants are not adults. Outright International describes forced marriage of LGBTQ people as "a mechanism of enforcing compulsory heterosexuality".

== Causes ==
=== Honor ===
Gay men and women can be forced to marry as a form of honor abuse, or abuse against someone seen as bringing shame to their community. Honor abuse is prevalent is some conservative Sihk, Muslim, and Hindu communities. Forced marriage is also performed in some South Asian communities due to homosexuality been seen as taboo, and those involved may be pressured into marrying out of fear for their family's reputation.

=== Control and conversion ===
Forced marriage is sometimes used by families in an attempt to control an LGBTQ person's sexuality or gender identity. South Asian Muslim families have used forced marriage to try to conceal their family member's LGBTQ+ identity. Forced marriage is sometimes used as a form of conversion therapy. There have been cases of parents in the United States forcing their LGBTQ child to get married in an attempt to change their sexual orientation or gender identity. There are reports of families in Guinea have arranging forced marriages of LGBTQ family members as a conversion practice. In Russia's North Caucas, queer women have been forced into marriage as an attempt to cure their sexual orientation.

=== Socio-economic disparities ===
In African countries, poor economic conditions may leave queer and transgender women feeling forced into entering cis-normative and heterosexual relationships. Some queer women in Africa may need to marry a man for safety since they could otherwise be at risk of violence or ostracization from their community.

In Iran, power structures that recognize women strictly as wives and mothers can leave lesbians at a disadvantage. This results in limited economic opportunities for lesbian women. Lesbians are left reliant upon their families, and thus more vulnerable to abuse and forced marriage.

Rules around divorce can make forced marriages difficult to leave. In Russia's North Caucasus, either the husband or another older man must initiate a divorce, thus preventing a lesbian woman from exiting a forced marriage.

=== Limited ability to consent ===
Sometimes LGBTQ people consent to marriages, but the validity of the consent is dubious due to their life circumstances. For instance, in Charedi Jewish communities, homosexuality is portrayed as an evil which will pass. People in this community grow up with no sex education until just before marriage and have no exposure to LGBTQ topics. As a result, some LGBTQ Charedi people enter marriages hoping it will cure them of their sexual orientation or gender identity. Eve Sacks, a trustee of the Jewish Orthodox Feminist Alliance UK, argues that this is forced marriage saying that "they give the normal legal definition of consent, but it's because of the circumstances in their life at that point that they have agreed to it".

== Practices ==
One method of forcing marriages involves having the person travel to a foreign country without knowing about the marriage. Once the person arrives, their family takes away their passport and tries to prevent them from leaving. Incidents tend to increase in the summer when people go on vacation abroad.

Lesbians may be prevented from escaping a forced marriage by having their ability to leave the home restricted. According to the U.S National Center for Lesbian Rights:

Her family may seek to control her even further, either as punishment or in a misinformed attempt to "cure" her lesbianism. To prevent a lesbian from developing a more independent life or to act on her attraction to other women, her family may restrict her movement, the challenges to successful lesbian asylum claims either by denying her permission to leave the house or simply by assigning her greater domestic responsibilities. Such a restricted life not only places practical limits on a lesbian's financial resources and support network outside of the home, but also may limit her awareness of ways to end or escape the persecution she currently suffers.

Forced marriages may be preceded by corrective rape of the victim. Corrective rape can be used to impregnate queer women so they are forced to get married. In Equatorial Guinea, corrective rape and forced marriage is seen as a curing homosexuality, which itself is perceived as European disease. Children born from this practice may be taken away from family members out of fear the woman's queerness will "contaminate" her child.

Forced marriages often continue to be abusive after the marriage is established. They can be physically, emotionally, and sexually abusive. These marriages can result in forced pregnancies and a lifelong denial of one's LGBTQ identity. Attempts to leave the forced marriage can be met with retaliation by the spouse or the person's family.

When the spouses have children voluntarily, it can still serve to further tether an LGBTQ person to the forced marriage by making it harder to leave the relationship. One transgender person raised in the Charedi community described how her parents would be happy every time her spouse had a child because she became further entangled into the marriage.

== Prevalence ==
Cases of forced marriage of LGBTQ people have occurred in a variety of countries including the United States, the United Kingdom, India, Pakistan, Iraq, Algeria, Senegal, Nigeria, Guinea, and Equatorial Guinea. When Human Rights Watch interviewed 66 LBQ+ (lesbian, bisexual, queer) advocates across different fields, they found that "Compulsory heterosexuality, the pressure to marry men, and coercive marriage practices were the most frequently reported abuses experienced by LBQ+ interviewees, including in Canada, Indonesia, Kenya, Kyrgyzstan, Lebanon, Malawi, Mexico, Poland, Sri Lanka, Tanzania, Tunisia, and Ukraine."

There is limited data on the forced marriage of LGBTQ people. Forced marriage is often framed as a women's rights or children's rights issue. The UK's Forced Marriage Unit identified five cases of forced marriages involving LGBTQ people 2022. However, the unit does not ask about the sexual orientation of their callers, so the actual amount of cases with an LGBTQ victim is unknown. In the case of child marriage, there is no data which categorizes LGBTQ and non-LGBTQ girls. Those in these marriages may fear reporting them and dishonoring their families. Gay men can be hesitant to ask for help since forced marriage of men is not as widely known of compared to forced marriage of women.
