= Rolly Xipu =

South African boxer

Rolly Sidima Xipu (born 12 January 1952) was a South African boxer, who fought from 1972 to 1981. Xipu held the South African lightweight title.

Rolly Xipu, became a political giant of the then greater Wits region. The comrades who started NUMSA 20 years ago needed to work clandestinely under the oppressive apartheid system. Among those who were there at the start, was Numsa Ekurhuleni regional organiser Rolly Xipu. Xipu was born in Payneville, Springs; his father was originally from the outskirts of Queenstown in the Eastern Cape. He grew up in church and played sport like any other growing youth becoming a professional boxer in South Africa.
