= Eudy Simelane =

South African footballer (1977–2008)

Personal information
- Date of birth: 11 March 1977
- Place of birth: KwaThema, South Africa
- Date of death: 28 April 2008 (aged 31)
- Place of death: KwaThema, South Africa
- Position: Midfielder

Senior career*
Years	Team	Apps	(Gls)
- Springs Home Sweepers F.C.

International career
- South Africa
- * Club domestic league appearances and goals

Eudy Simelane (11 March 1977 – 28 April 2008) was a South African footballer who played for the South African national team and was an LGBT rights activist. She was one of the first lesbian women to live openly in KwaThema, Springs, Gauteng. Because of this, she was gang raped—in what was called corrective rape—and murdered at the age of 31.

== Early life ==
Simelane was born on 11 March 1977, in Kwa-Thema, a township in the Gauteng province, southeast of Johannesburg. When she was only four years old, she became interested in Football. Bafana Simelane said that his sister was a very playful child who developed a love for soccer from following him around everywhere he went.

== Football ==
Nicknamed 'Styles' because she was left-footed, midfielder Simelane joined her local team, Kwa-Thema Ladies, now known as the Springs Home Sweepers. Simelane played several times for the national side, coached four local youth teams, and wanted to qualify to become her country's first female referee.

== Activism ==
Simelane used her status as a local soccer celebrity to further her LGBTQI+ activism.

== Death ==
Simelane's partially clothed body was found in a creek in KwaThema. She had been abducted, gang raped, beaten, and stabbed 25 times in the face, chest, and legs. She had been one of the first women to live openly as a lesbian in KwaThema. A report by the international NGO ActionAid, backed by the South African Human Rights Commission, suggested that her murder was a hate crime committed against her because of her sexual orientation.

According to local gay rights organization The Triangle Project, the practice of "corrective rape" is widespread in South Africa, whereby men rape lesbians purportedly to "cure" them of their sexual orientation.

The trial of four suspected attackers began on 11 February 2009 in Delmas, Mpumalanga. One of the four alleged attackers pleaded guilty to rape and murder and was sentenced to 32 years' imprisonment. In September 2009, another was convicted of murder, rape, and robbery, and sentenced to life plus 35 years, but the remaining two accused were acquitted.

== Eudy Simelane Memorial Lecture ==
This annual lecture is hosted by the University of KwaZulu-Natal’s School of Religion. The lecture typically focuses on issues related to LGBTQ+ rights, gender equality, and social justice, highlighting the struggles and contributions of the LGBTQ+ community in South Africa and beyond.

== Honors ==
A miniature bridge was erected in KwaThema, Springs, Gauteng, in her honor in 2009.
