= Bavumile Vilakazi =

South African politician (1955–2005)

Mayor of Ekurhuleni
- In office December 2000 – 2001
- Preceded by: Office established
- Succeeded by: Duma Nkosi

Member of the National Assembly
- In office 9 May 1994 – 6 December 2000
- Constituency: Gauteng

Personal details
- Born: Bavumile Herbert Vilakazi; 12 June 1955 Evaton, Transvaal; Union of South Africa
- Died: 21 April 2005 (aged 49) Kampala, Uganda
- Citizenship: South Africa
- Party: African National Congress

Bavumile Herbert Vilakazi (12 June 1955 – 21 April 2005) was a South African politician, diplomat and former anti-apartheid activist who was the inaugural Mayor of Ekurhuleni from 2000 to 2001. Before that, he represented the African National Congress (ANC) in the National Assembly from 1994 to 2000.

During apartheid, Vilakazi was a member of the United Democratic Front and a defendant in the Delmas Treason Trial. He also served as leader of the Vaal Civic Association on the East Rand. From 2002 until his death in 2005, he served as South African High Commissioner to Uganda.

== Early life and activism ==
Vilakazi was born on 12 June 1955 in Evaton in the former Transvaal; he was the fifth of five brothers. His family was living in Sharpeville at the time of the 1960 Sharpeville massacre, but they later moved to Residensia. As a young adult, he was a Sunday school teacher at the local African Methodist Episcopal Church, and in 1977 he was also elected president of the church's youth league.

From 1979 to 1982, he worked at the Vaal Transport Corporation, where he became active in the Transport and Allied Workers' Union as a shop steward and member of the union's Vaal branch executive. In 1982, he joined the Urban Training Project as an education officer with responsibility for the Vaal and Orange Free State regions; his mandate was to identify and fulfil unions' educational needs, and he specialised in occupational health and safety.

== United Democratic Front: 1983–1994 ==
In 1983, Vilakazi was a founding member of the Vaal Civic Association, an affiliate of the United Democratic Front (UDF), and he was elected as the area representative for Sebokeng. He was arrested in December 1984 for political offences and the following year was trialled with other UDF activists in the Delmas Treason Trial.

Upon his release, he became the leader of the Vaal Civic Association. In that capacity, he led a protest march from Sebokeng to Vereeniging on 26 March 1990; in what became known as the Sebokeng massacre, the police opened fire on the crowd, killing at least thirteen people, while Vilakazi was addressing them. The massacre led the ANC to withdraw temporarily from the negotiations to end apartheid. Also in the early 1990s, he served as deputy provincial secretary of the ANC's Gauteng branch.

== Post-apartheid political career: 1994–2001 ==
In the 1994 general election, South Africa's first under universal suffrage, Vilakazi was elected to represent the ANC in the National Assembly, the lower house of the new South African Parliament. He was re-elected in the 1999 general election and served the Gauteng constituency. He resigned from his seat on 6 December 2000, after the 2000 local elections, in which he was elected as the inaugural Mayor of the newly incorporated Ekurhuleni Metropolitan Municipality. His seat in Parliament was filled by Rita Ndzanga.

== Diplomatic career and death: 2001–2005 ==
In 2001, Vilakazi left the mayoral office and joined the diplomatic service. President Thabo Mbeki appointed him as South African High Commissioner to Uganda, a post he took up in March 2002. He died of a heart attack in Kampala, Uganda on 21 April 2005, shortly after receiving Deputy President Jacob Zuma at the Kampala Airport.

He was buried at Vanderbijlpark and Zuma, by then the President of South Africa, spoke at the unveiling of his tombstone in 2011. The M2–N3 interchange in Germiston, formerly known as the Geldenhuys Interchange, was renamed after him in 2021.

== Personal life ==
At the time of the Delmas Treason Trial, Vilakazi was married and had a toddler.
