= Nkosindiphile Xhakaza =

Mayor of Ekurhuleni (born 1977)

Mayor of Ekurhuleni
- Incumbent
- Assumed office 11 April 2024
- Preceded by: Sivuyile Ngodwana

Personal details
- Born: 1977 (age 48–49)
- Party: African National Congress

Nkosindiphile Doctor Xhakaza (born 1977) is a South African politician. He has served as the Executive Mayor of the City of Ekurhuleni Metropolitan Municipality since April 2024. He is a member of the African National Congress (ANC).

== Early life and career ==
Xhakaza is from the Lebeong Section of Thembisa in Gauteng. He studied at the Vaal University of Technology, where he obtained a National Diploma in Cost and Management Accounting, and later earned a Postgraduate Diploma in Public Management from Regenesys Business School. Before his political career, he held positions at Standard Bank and Siemens.

== Political career ==
Xhakaza was a member of the Congress of South African Students (COSAS) and later joined the South African Students Congress (SASCO) and the African National Congress Youth League (ANCYL). He was elected as an ANC proportional representation councillor in Ekurhuleni in 2011 and served as the Deputy Chief Whip for the ANC Caucus.

During the administration of Mzwandile Masina, Xhakaza was appointed Member of the Mayoral Committee (MMC) for Water and Energy, and later oversaw Finance and Economic Development. Under Mayor Sivuyile Ngodwana, he held the portfolio of MMC for Corporate and Shared Services.

In 2022, Xhakaza contested the position of ANC regional chairperson in Ekurhuleni, losing to Masina by 12 votes. The results were set aside by the Gauteng High Court in July 2023 due to irregularities. He ran again in August 2025 and was elected regional chairperson after defeating Sello Sekhokho.

=== Mayoral term ===
Xhakaza was elected mayor of Ekurhuleni on 11 April 2024. He stood unopposed following a motion of no confidence against Sivuyile Ngodwana.

In February 2026, Xhakaza reshuffled his mayoral committee, reducing the Economic Freedom Fighters (EFF) presence from five MMC positions to two. He offered a committee position to ActionSA, which the party declined. Following the reshuffle, the EFF withdrew from the coalition government. Xhakaza filled the vacancies with ANC councillors.

ANC regional secretary Jongizizwe Dlabathi resigned from the mayoral committee in February 2026, citing a lack of consultation regarding the reshuffle. However, the ANC National Executive Committee rejected the resignation and Dlabathi returned to his duties in March 2026.

== Controversies ==
In January 2026, reports emerged that Xhakaza was present during the September 2023 shooting of DJ Bongani Mfito in Kempton Park. He did not report his presence at the scene to authorities at the time of the incident. In a later affidavit, Xhakaza stated he knew Mfito socially but denied involvement in the crime.

In April 2026, councillors from the Democratic Alliance, EFF, and ActionSA walked out of a council meeting after Xhakaza failed to attend a sitting regarding fraud charges against City Manager Kagiso Lerutla.
