= Tania Campbell =

South African politician (born 1967)

Alderwoman Tania Campbell
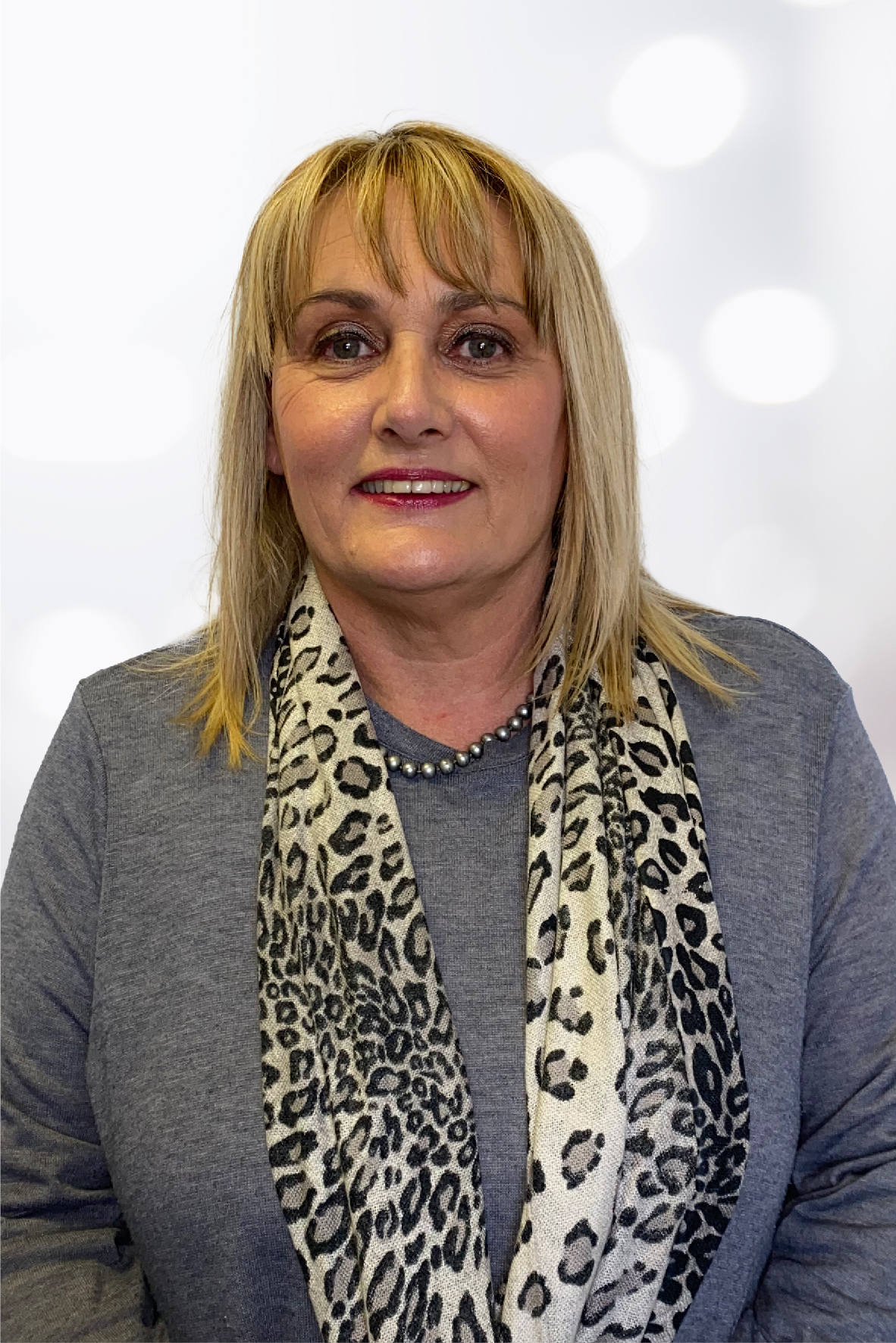
- Campbell in 2021

Mayor of Ekurhuleni
- In office 8 November 2022 – 30 March 2023
- Preceded by: Position vacant
- Succeeded by: Sivuyile Ngodwana
- In office 22 November 2021 – 26 October 2022
- Preceded by: Mzwandile Masina
- Succeeded by: Position vacant

Member of the Ekurhuleni City Council
- Incumbent
- Assumed office 5 December 2000

Leader of the Democratic Alliance Caucus in Ekurhuleni
- Incumbent
- Assumed office October 2020
- Preceded by: Phillip de Lange

Personal details
- Born: 1967 (age 58–59) Hillbrow, Transvaal Province, South Africa
- Party: Democratic Alliance (1997-present)
- Spouse: Dave Campbell
- Relations: Michéle Clarke (sister)
- Children: 1
- Education: Germiston Technical College
- Alma mater: University of Pretoria
- Occupation: Politician; legislator

Tania Lynette Campbell (born 1967) is a South African Democratic Alliance politician who served as the Mayor of Ekurhuleni twice, from November 2021 until her removal in a motion of no confidence in October 2022 and again from November 2022 until her removal in a second motion of no confidence in March 2023.

== Early life ==
Campbell attended Germiston Technical College. She went on to study human rights and executive municipal leadership with a focus on budgetary principles and performance management at the University of Pretoria.

== Political career ==
Campbell joined the Democratic Alliance in 1997 and became a councillor in 2000 when the City of Ekurhuleni Metropolitan Municipality was established. She was elected as the ward Councillor for Ward 21 (Primrose) in 2006 and retained the ward in the 2011 elections. In 2013, she was elected chairperson of the DA caucus in the metro and was also appointed as DA Chief Whip in 2016. Ald Campbell also served on numerous oversights in Ekurhuleni during her term of office. In October 2020, she was elected as DA caucus leader after the incumbent, Phillip de Lange, resigned after a motion of no confidence was brought against him by the caucus.

== Mayor of Ekurhuleni ==
=== Election ===
In the local elections held on 1 November 2021, no party obtained a majority of seats in the city council. The DA came in second with 28% of the vote behind the ANC with 38% of the vote. The DA mayoral candidate for the metro, Refiloe Nt'sekhe, withdrew her councillor candidacy on 8 November to instead continue serving as a member of the provincial legislature since she did not believe that she would be elected as Executive Mayor.

At the inaugural council meeting on 22 November, Raymond Dlamini of the DA was unexpectedly elected as speaker of the council with the help of smaller parties such as ActionSA and the Economic Freedom Fighters in a major upset. The DA then nominated Campbell as their candidate in the election for mayor against the incumbent Mzwandile Masina from the African National Congress (ANC). Campbell won with 116 votes over Masina's 105 votes, becoming the first DA member to serve as Executive Mayor of the metro. Campbell said in an interview with News24 that she was shocked that she was elected mayor and that her tenure as mayor would be "tough" as the DA does not hold a majority of seats in the council. She said in her inaugural address as mayor that she would be focusing on service delivery issues in the metro.

=== Tenure ===
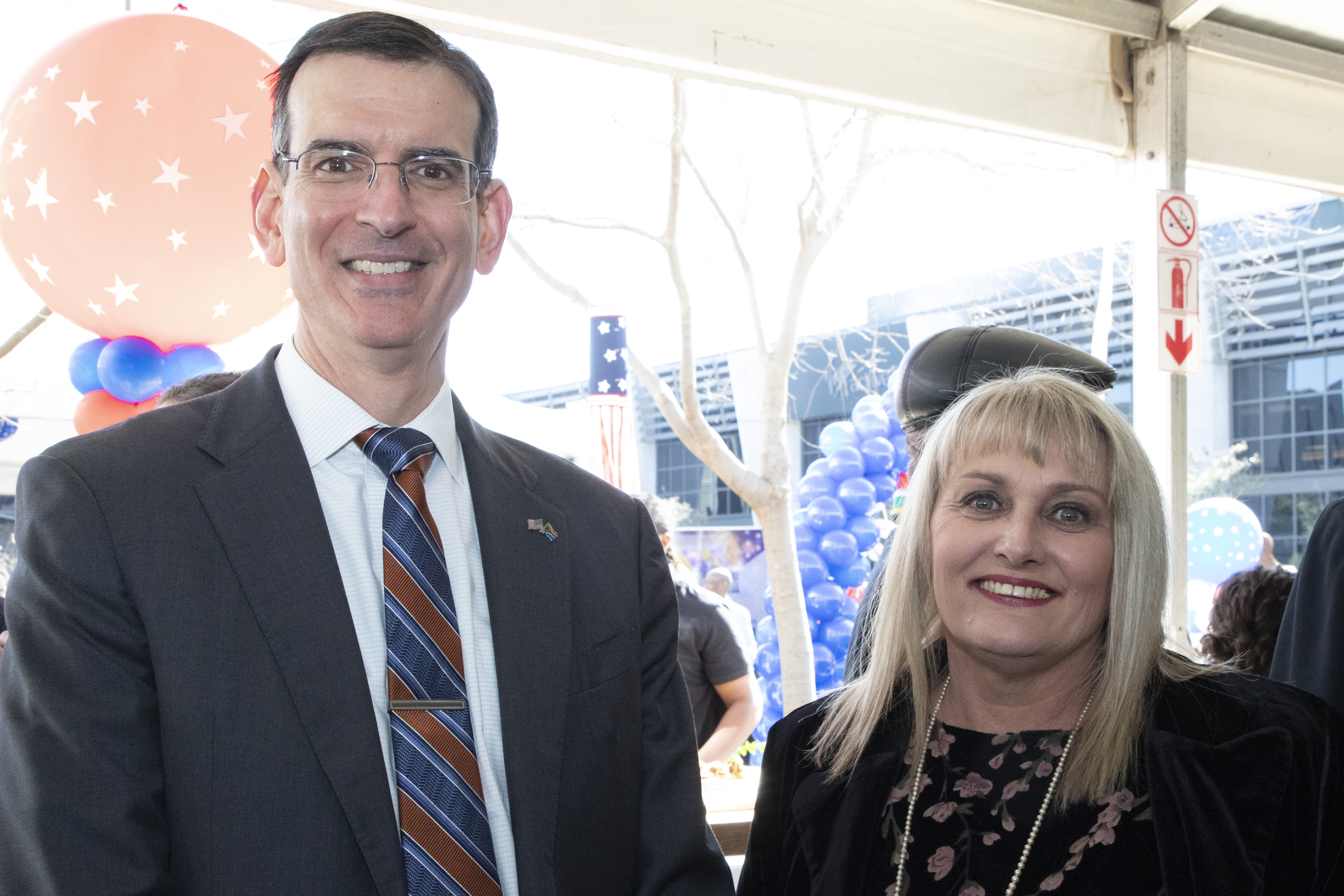
Campbell with the United States Consul-General in Johannesburg, Vincent Spera

On 11 December 2021, Campbell announced her 10-member mayoral committee. A majority of the portfolios have DA MMCs, while ActionSA secured two portfolios and the Inkatha Freedom Party and the Congress of the People received one portfolio each. Campbell said that her mayoral committee will begin to work to "charter a new path of renewed hope for the communities of Ekurhuleni". On 28 February 2022, Campbell reshuffled her mayoral committee to include two Patriotic Alliance councillors after the multi-party coalition signed a new agreement to bring the PA into the coalition.

On 2 March 2022, Campbell celebrated her first 100 days in office as mayor. She criticised the ANC's call for the City to write off 75% debt of all municipal accounts for households as "reckless" and "shortsighted" on 15 March. On 16 March, she denied ActionSA leader Herman Mashaba's claim that she had made a deal with the EFF that they would sit in on the panel that interviews head of departments and the city manager, in exchange for their support to pass the metro's adjustment budget in February.

On 26 October 2022, Campbell was voted out as mayor in an ANC-sponsored motion of no confidence. 100 councillors voted for her removal, while 93 voted against it. The Economic Freedom Fighters abstained from the vote. On 8 November 2022 Campbell was voted back in as mayor of Ekurhuleni after attaining 124 of the 224 votes. 1 ballot was spoilt. Notably, the EFF had voted with DA and its coalition partners to re-elect her. Coalition talks between the ANC and EFF had failed to reach an agreement, with the ANC's provincial executive committee rejecting a proposal for the election of an EFF mayor in the metro, paving the way for Campbell to return as mayor.

Campbell was again removed as mayor in a motion of confidence brought against her by the ANC-EFF coalition and seven other smaller parties. 126 councillors voted for the motion, while 91 councillors voted to keep Campbell as mayor. In the subsequent mayoral election, Campbell stood for mayor again, but was defeated by African Independent Congress councillor Sivuyile Ngodwana, receiving only 75 votes to Sivuyile Ngodwana's 129 votes.

== Personal life ==
Campbell's sister is Michéle Clarke, who is a Member of Parliament for the DA and the party's spokesperson on health.
