= Mzwandile Masina =

South African politician (born 1974)

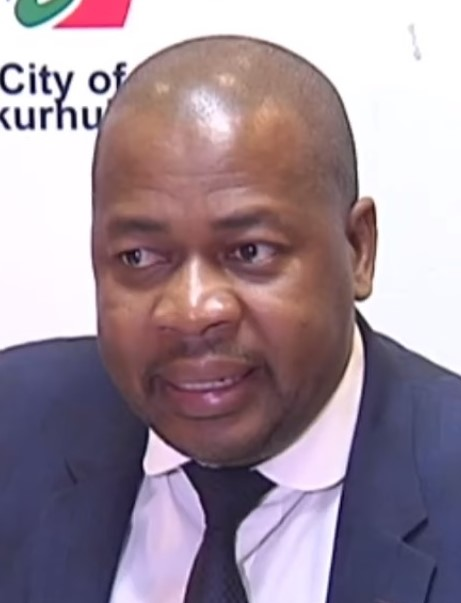
- Masina in July 2019

Member of the National Assembly
- Incumbent
- Assumed office 14 June 2024
- In office 21 May 2014 – 23 August 2016

Mayor of Ekurhuleni
- In office 23 August 2016 – 22 November 2021
- Preceded by: Mondli Gungubele
- Succeeded by: Tania Campbell

Deputy Minister of Trade and Industry
- In office 25 May 2014 – 23 August 2016
- President: Jacob Zuma
- Minister: Rob Davies
- Preceded by: Thandi Tobias; Elizabeth Thabethe
- Succeeded by: Bulelani Magwanishe

Personal details
- Born: Mzwandile Collen Masina; 2 September 1974 (age 51) East Rand, Transvaal; South Africa
- Party: African National Congress
- Spouse: Sinazo Masina (m. 2016)

Mzwandile Collen Masina (born 2 September 1974) is a South African politician from Gauteng who has represented the African National Congress (ANC) in the National Assembly since June 2024. He is the chairperson of Parliament's Portfolio Committee on Trade, Industry and Competition. He was formerly the Mayor of Ekurhuleni from 2016 to 2021 and the Deputy Minister of Trade and Industry from 2014 to 2016.

Born in Ekurhuleni, Masina entered politics as a student activist. He rose to prominence in 2013 when he was appointed as the interim national leader of the ANC Youth League. After that he joined the National Assembly in the May 2014 general election, and he served two years as a deputy minister in the government of President Jacob Zuma. He was a staunch political ally to Zuma throughout Zuma's presidency.

Pursuant to the August 2016 local elections, he was elected as Mayor of Ekurhuleni, a position he held for the next five years. He was also the chairperson of the ANC's regional branch in Ekurhuleni between 2014 and 2022. In December 2022 he was elected to a five-year term as a member of the ANC National Executive Committee.

== Early life and career ==
Born on 2 September 1974, Masina was born and raised on the East Rand in the Transvaal, an area that is now called Ekurhuleni. His family were active in the anti-apartheid movement, and he became politically active as a teenager, joining the African National Congress (ANC) and its Youth League. As a student he chaired a branch of the Congress of South African Students, and he was also a member of the South African Students Congress. He attended the University of the Witwatersrand and the University of Pretoria, where he completed a Master's degree in entrepreneurship.

Before he became a full-time politician, Masina worked in various public agencies, including as a chief director in the Department of Mineral Resources, director for economic empowerment in the Ekurhuleni Metropolitan Municipality, programme manager in the Ntsika Enterprise Promotion Agency, deputy director-general in the provincial Department of Sport, Arts, Culture and Recreation in Gauteng, director for business development in the Department of Trade and Industry, and general manager for empowerment at Uthingo Management. In 2012 he was appointed as chief executive officer of the Gauteng Film Commission.

Meanwhile he rose through the ranks of the ANC to become secretary of his local branch, as well as a member of the executive committee of the Ekurhuleni regional branch. He reportedly supported President Jacob Zuma's bid for re-election at the ANC's 53rd National Conference in December 2012; at the time this was an unpopular position in Gauteng.

In April 2013, the ANC's national leadership appointed Masina as the interim national convenor of the ANC Youth League. The league's elected leadership, previously headed by Julius Malema, had been disbanded for ill-discipline and Masina was tasked with leading the league until fresh elections could be held. During his tenure as convenor, his forthright criticism of public figures often caused controversy.

== Deputy Minister of Trade and Industry: 2014–2016 ==
In the May 2014 general election, Masina was elected to represent the ANC in the National Assembly, the lower house of the South African Parliament. He was ranked 109th on the ANC's national party list. Announcing his second cabinet on 25 May 2014, President Zuma named Masina as Deputy Minister of Trade and Industry. In that capacity he deputised Minister Rob Davies.

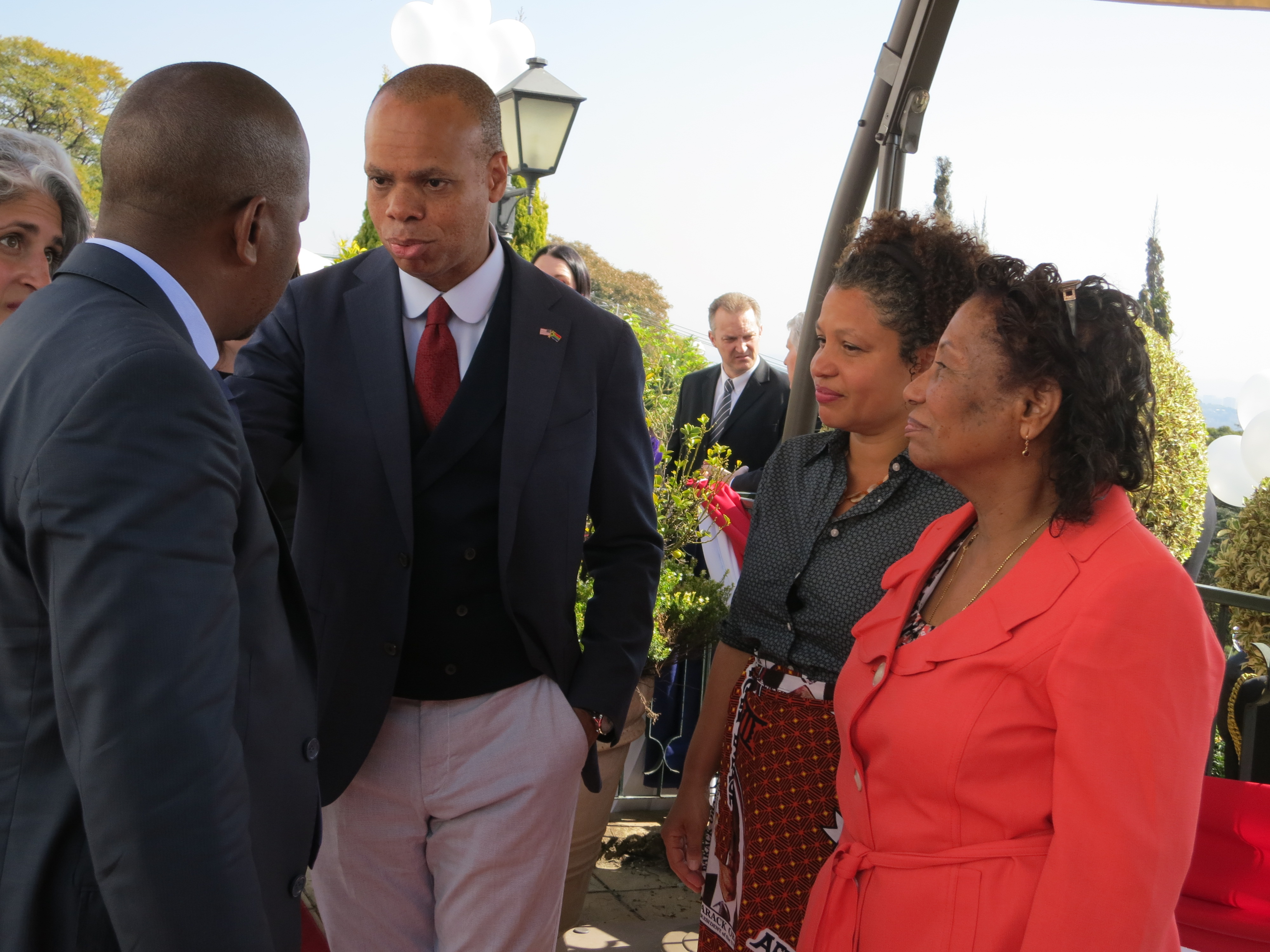
Masina (left) with American Ambassador Patrick Gaspard, July 2014

In early November 2014, a party elective conference elected Masina as chairman of the mainstream ANC's influential regional branch in the City of Ekurhuleni. Robert Mashego was elected as his deputy. In the early years of his term as chairman, Masina established himself as a rival of the incumbent provincial leadership of the party in Gauteng, which included Paul Mashatile and David Makhura; among other things, these provincial leaders did not share Masina's support of President Zuma.

== Mayor of Ekurhuleni: 2016–2021 ==
In June 2016, the ANC announced that Masina would be the party's candidate for election as Mayor of Ekurhuleni in the upcoming local elections. The Mail & Guardian reported that his candidacy had been supported by the ANC's national leadership over the objections of the ANC Provincial Executive Committee in Gauteng, which supported the incumbent mayor, Mondli Gungubele, for re-election. Some of his critics said that there had been electoral irregularities in the ANC's candidate selection process.

Masina's campaign platform included promises to build 100,000 houses, institute 24/7 service in public clinics in Tembisa, and establish a higher education institution in the city. When the election was held on 3 August 2016, the ANC lost its majority in the Ekurhuleni municipality. However, on 23 August, the newly constituted council voted to elect Masina as mayor; he received 117 votes, while Ghaleb Cachalia of the Democratic Alliance (DA) received 106 votes. His election was supported by two minor parties, the African Independent Congress and Pan Africanist Congress, which had signed a coalition agreement with the ANC.

Masina resigned from the National Assembly in order to take up the mayoral office. His policies as mayor included an inner-city renewal programme in Germiston.

=== RET faction ===
Throughout his mayoral term, Masina continued his advocacy on behalf of President Zuma, publicly opposing calls for Zuma to step down amid mounting corruption allegations. He was described as "a 'Zuma hardliner'" and as "Zuma's point person" in Gauteng.

Ahead of the ANC's 54th National Conference in December 2017, Masina backed Nkosazana Dlamini-Zuma, another Zuma ally, in her campaign to succeed Zuma as ANC president. Indeed, in October 2017, Masina told News24 that he would resign as ANC regional chairperson rather than serve under Dlamini-Zuma's opponent, Cyril Ramaphosa. Ramaphosa was nonetheless elected to the ANC presidency in December 2017, and thereafter Masina aligned himself with Ace Magashule, the newly elected ANC secretary-general who was regarded as Ramaphosa's foremost antagonist in the party leadership.

Masina was also noted for his close relationship with the opposition Economic Freedom Fighters (EFF): he was a personal friend of EFF leader Julius Malema and appeared sympathetic to many of the party's political and policy positions. In 2020 Masina was sanctioned by his own party after he Tweeted support for Malema's proposal that the "white economy should be allowed to collapse".

=== ANC chairmanship ===
Masina was re-elected to his second term as ANC regional chairperson in July 2018, now with Jongizizwe Dlabathi as his deputy. However, at the Gauteng ANC's provincial elective conference the following month, he launched a campaign to be elected to higher office as the party's provincial treasurer. He stood on a slate of candidates aligned to presidential challenger Lebogang Maile; Masina and Maile had been political allies since their time in the ANC Youth League. The conference elected Parks Tau as provincial treasurer, and Maile also failed to gain election to a leadership position; Masina continued as Ekurhuleni chairperson instead.

=== Car accident ===
In August 2020 Masina was involved in a fender bender on the N12 near Alberton while driving a city-owned car. AmaBhungane reported that he had not been authorised to drive the car – a BMW 540i – and that the accident had been covered up.

=== Removal from office ===
Ahead of the 2021 local elections, the ANC nominated Masina to stand for re-election as mayor. When the elections were held on 1 November 2021, the party again failed to gain a majority of council seats. Sitting for the first time on 22 November 2021, the newly elected council elected Tania Campbell of the DA to succeed Masina as mayor; Campbell received 116 votes against Masina's 105. The EFF supported Campbell over Masina, though Malema Tweeted that this decision was "nothing personal" and that Masina remained "my brother".

== Opposition leader in Ekurhuleni: 2021–2022 ==
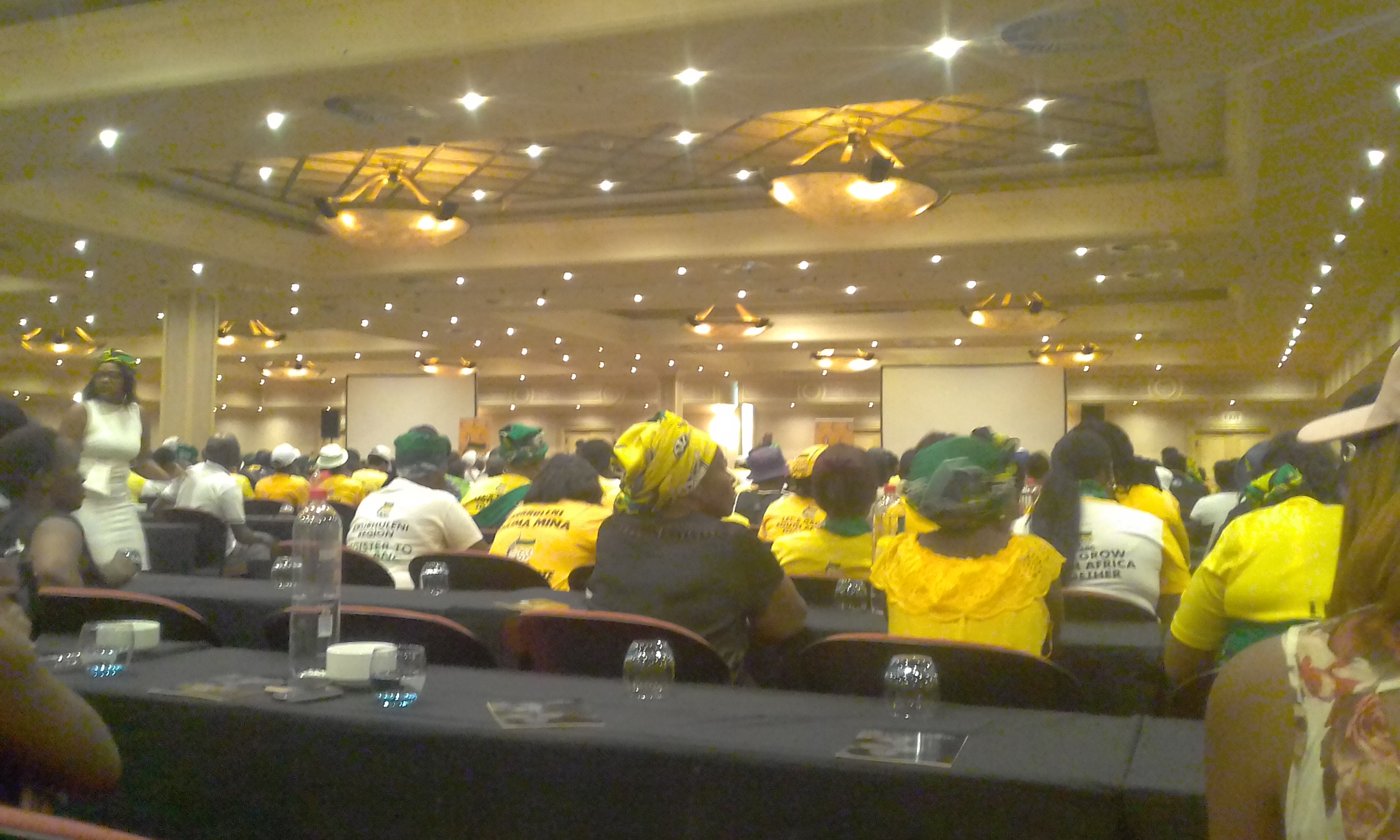
A meeting of the Ekurhuleni ANC in Kempton Park, March 2020

After his removal from the mayoral office, Masina remained in Ekurhuleni as an ordinary proportional-representation councillor and the leader of the ANC's opposition caucus. On 31 March 2022, police officers forcibly removed him from a council meeting, allegedly after he disrupted a debate on Campbell's State of the City address. He also continued to serve as ANC regional chairperson: at an elective conference in May 2022, he narrowly defeated a challenge to his incumbency, receiving 163 votes against Doctor Xhakaza's 151 in a contest marred by disruptions and allegations of electoral improprieties. Indeed, a court invalidated the election a year later.

In October 2022, Campbell was removed from the mayoral office by a motion of no confidence. Masina was reportedly instrumental in orchestrating the motion, and observers expected him to return to the mayoral office at the head of a new ANC–EFF coalition. However, within a fortnight, Campbell was reinstated as mayor with the support of the EFF. EFF leader Malema complained about Masina's conduct in an interview with Newzroom Afrika, alleging that ANC–EFF cooperation had fallen apart because Masina reneged on an agreement between the parties. Malema said of Masina that, "He behaves like a Bantustan leader. Masina has regional consciousness... he doesn’t have national consciousness."

Meanwhile, ANC provincial chairperson Panyaza Lesufi said that Masina had brought the motion of no confidence in defiance of the wishes of the party leadership; on these grounds he was accused of having undermined negotiations between the ANC and EFF, and Lesufi said that he would face internal disciplinary charges for bringing the ANC into disrepute. On 24 November 2022 the ANC announced that Masina would resign as a local councillor with effect from 30 November.

== 55th National Conference: 2022 ==
Ahead of the ANC's 55th National Conference in December 2022, Masina and his Ekurhuleni regional branch were staunch supporters of Zweli Mkhize's bid to oust Ramaphosa as ANC president. In addition, Masina himself was nominated to stand for the position of ANC treasurer-general. Other contenders for the office included Bejani Chauke, Pule Mabe, and Gwen Ramokgopa.

However, when the conference opened on 18 December, Masina withdrew from the race and endorsed Mabe, saying that he and Mabe had shared objectives – including shared support for Mkhize's campaign – and therefore wished to avoid splitting the vote. However, at the time of Masina's withdrawal, his name had already been printed on the ballot and voting had begun; despite his withdrawal, he received 281 votes. Mabe lost to Ramokgopa by a margin of just 157 votes.

However, the conference elected Masina to his first five-year term as an ordinary member of the ANC National Executive Committee. By popularity, he was ranked 31st of the 80 candidates elected, receiving 1,408 votes across the 4,029 ballots cast in total. After his election to the National Executive Committee, he stepped down as Ekurhuleni regional chairperson, as required by ANC rules.

== Return to the National Assembly: 2024–present ==
Masina stood as an ANC candidate in the May 2024 general election, ranked fifth on the ANC's regional party list for the Gauteng constituency. He was elected to return to the National Assembly. In addition, on 10 July 2024, he was elected as the chairperson of Parliament's Portfolio Committee on Trade, Industry and Competition.

== Personal life ==
Masina lives in Katlehong, Ekurhuleni. His wife is Sinazo Masina. They married in November 2016 at a ceremony in Stellenbosch and hosted a traditional ceremony at Masina's family home in Ekurhuleni in December.
