= Sivuyile Ngodwana =

South African politician

Councillor Sivuyile Ngodwana

Mayor of Ekurhuleni
- In office 30 March 2023 – 28 March 2024
- Preceded by: Tania Campbell
- Succeeded by: Nkosindiphile Xhakaza

Personal details
- Party: African Independent Congress
- Profession: Politician

Sivuyile Ngodwana is a South African politician who served as the mayor of Ekurhuleni from 30 March 2023 until 28 March 2024. He is a member of the African Independent Congress, a party that holds three seats in the Ekurhuleni city council.

== Mayoral career ==
After the Democratic Alliance's Tania Campbell was removed as mayor of Ekurhuleni in a motion of no confidence on 30 March 2023, a subsequent mayoral election was held to elect her successor hours later. Ngodwana stood in the mayoral election against Campbell and defeated her, receiving 129 votes to Campbell's 75 votes. Ngodwana's election as mayor was part of the African National Congress and Economic Freedom Fighters' calculated takeover of Gauteng metros with the help of the Patriotic Alliance and other parties where a councillor from a small party is elected as mayor or council speaker then the ANC/EFF/PA/minority bloc is given seats in the municipality's mayoral committee. The neighbouring City of Johannesburg Metropolitan Municipality is also governed this way.

In his inaugural address as mayor, Ngodwana said that he would prioritise service delivery issues in the metro, such as eliminating rolling blackouts, fixing potholes and cutting grass.

Ngodwana was voted out in a motion of no confidence on 28 March 2024 which saw 47 councillors voting for his removal with 32 voting against.
