= Mayor of Ekurhuleni =

- Incumbent; Nkosindiphile Xhakaza since 11 April 2024
- Style: The Honourable
- Seat: Ekurhuleni Head Office, Cnr Roses and Cross Streets, Germiston
- Appointer: City of Ekurhuleni Municipal Council
- Term length: Five years
- Formation: 2000
- First holder: Bavumile Vilakazi
- Website: Official website

The mayor of Ekurhuleni is the head of the local government of South Africa's City of Ekurhuleni Metropolitan Municipality, established in 2000.

== List of mayors of Ekurhuleni ==
Name	Term of office		Political party	Ref.
Bavumile Vilakazi	2000	2001	African National Congress	
Duma Nkosi	2001	2008	African National Congress	
Ntombi Mekgwe	2008	2010	African National Congress	
Mondli Gungubele	2010	2016	African National Congress	
Mzwandile Masina	2016	2021	African National Congress	
Tania Campbell	2021	2022	Democratic Alliance	
Tania Campbell	2022	2023	Democratic Alliance	
Sivuyile Ngodwana	2023	2024	African Independent Congress	
Nkosindiphile Xhakaza	2024	present	African National Congress	

== See also ==
- City of Ekurhuleni elections
