= Langaville =

- Location within Gauteng Location within South Africa
- Coordinates: 26°21′24″S 28°22′18″E
- Country: South Africa
- Province: Gauteng
- Municipality: Ekurhuleni

Area
  - Total: 10.10 km^{2} (3.90 sq mi)

Population (2011)
  - Total: 54,710
  - Density: 5,417/km^{2} (14,030/sq mi)

Racial makeup (2011)
  - Black African: 98.95%
  - Other: 0.41%
  - Coloured: 0.41%
  - Indian/Asian: 0.17%
  - White: 0.06%

First languages (2011)
  - Zulu: 46.17%
  - Northern Sotho: 11.90%
  - Tsonga: 10.41%
  - Xhosa: 8.95%
  - Sotho: 6.95%
- Time zone: UTC+2 (SAST)

Langaville is a township located near Tsakane, in Gauteng province, South Africa.
