= Etwatwa =

Etwatwa Holfontein Esthwathweni
- Location within Gauteng Location within South Africa
- Coordinates: 26.115°S 28.463°E
- Country: South Africa
- Province: Gauteng
- Municipality: Ekurhuleni
- Established: 1985

Government
  - Councillors: Masele Madihlaba, Mzwakhe Khumalo, Jerry Moimane, Siyabonga Moloi and Thamaga wa GaMathole (ANC)

Area
  - Total: 20.83 km^{2} (8.04 sq mi)

Population (2011)
  - Total: 151,866
  - Density: 7,291/km^{2} (18,880/sq mi)

Racial makeup (2011)
  - Black African: 99.3%
  - Coloured: 0.3%
  - Indian/Asian: 0.2%
  - White: 0.1%
  - Other: 0.2%

First languages (2011)
  - Zulu: 44.9%
  - Tsonga: 12.9%
  - Northern Sotho: 12.1%
  - Sotho: 7.3%
  - Other: 22.7%
- Time zone: UTC+2 (SAST)
- Postal code (street): 1519
- Area code: 011

Etwatwa, also known as Holfontein, is a township that 20 km away from Benoni, 24 kilometres away from springs in Ekurhuleni in the Gauteng province of South Africa. It is made up of the following sections: Etwatwa West, Quantum, Barcelona, Mkgoba, Bester Homes, Etwatwa Ext 7, Citicon, Etwatwa East, Etwatwa Ext 9, Etwatwa Ext 10, (these both known as Emaphupheni, which means land of dreams in Nguni) and Mandela. Etwatwa is also known as the last town, as it is not far from the Gauteng-Mpumalanga border to the east towards Delmas.

== History ==
Etwatwa was established as an extension of Daveyton to accommodate the overflow of people from the township, particularly those living in informal settlements.By 1985 Etwatwa was established under Benoni council and later absorbed Into the newly established Ekurhuleni Metropolitan municipality in 2000.

The area was divided into Etwatwa West and Etwatwa East, with varying levels of service provision. Over time, Etwatwa has seen the development of formal settlements since 1985 with the apartheid style houses and RDP houses after 1994.

== Recent history ==
Etwatwa has decent infrastructure such as Schools, Fire station, libraries, Parks, Clinics and shopping centre named Etwatwa Crossing Mall

Due to urban demands there been calls for greater integration such as Infrastructure developments to meet the large population size.

PRASA has made promises since the 1990s to connect it to Daveyton rail but has not been delivered .In its latest documents PRASA has made commitment to connect it in the long term
