= Helderwyk Extension 8 =

- Location in Gauteng Helderwyk Extension 8 (South Africa)
- Coordinates: 26.2747°S 28.2974°E
- Country: South Africa
- Province: Gauteng
- Municipality: Ekurhuleni
- Main Place: Brakpan
- Area code: 1541

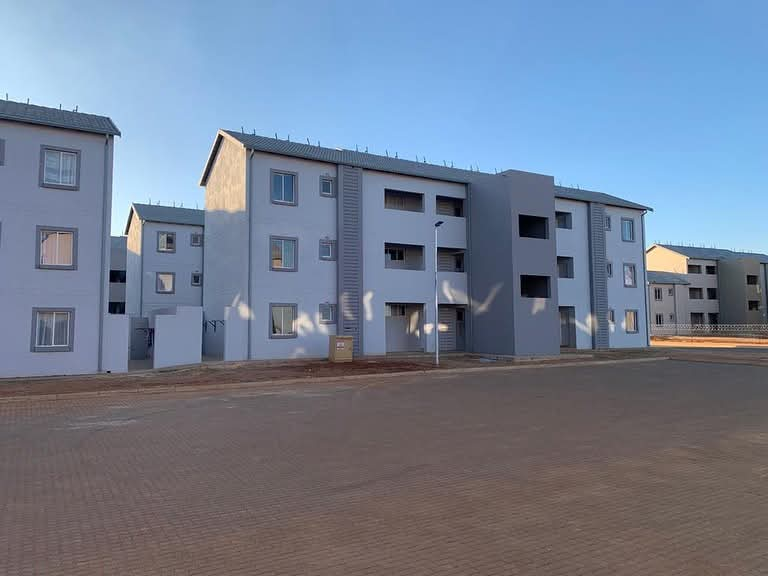
Helderwyk Extension 8 Apartment Complex

Helderwyk Extension 8 is a township complex comprising multiple apartment buildings, forming a secure and integrated apartment complex. It is located in the town of Brakpan, within Ekurhuleni Metropolitan Municipality, Gauteng, South Africa. It was developed as part of a government housing initiative within the broader Helderwyk Mega Housing Project managed by the Gauteng Provincial Government. It is situated near Carnival City Casino and Carnival Mall. It also situated near major transport routes, like the R554 which connects the southern suburbs of Soweto with Springs in Ekurhuleni via Lenasia, Alberton and Brakpan, the N17 which runs from Johannesburg to Oshoek (Ngwenya) on the border with Eswatini, and the M43 which connects Vosloorus with the Birchleigh suburb of Kempton Park via Boksburg.

== History ==
Helderwyk Extension 8 was created as part of the Gauteng Department of Human Settlements' Reconstruction and Development Programme housing roll-out. The project's overall goal is to deliver more than 13,000 housing units, encompassing a variety of housing types, including fully subsidised units, bonded houses, and serviced stands. In addition to housing, the development plan includes provisions for essential social amenities such as schools and clinics. The design emphasises the creation of an integrated community, aiming to prevent isolated housing developments by incorporating various economic and residential facilities.

The development proceeded in phases. Phase 1 commenced in 2022, focusing on the construction of the apartment complex. By the end of 2023, 273 units were delivered, followed by an additional 477 units completed in 2024. Phase 1 was formally completed in 2025, resulting in a total delivery of 76 apartment blocks and 903 units.

Phase 2 of the Helderwyk Mega Housing Project began shortly following the successful conclusion of Phase 1, with construction currently underway

== Geography and Climate ==
Helderwyk Extension 8 is situated on the Highveld plateau, the large inland plateau that characterises the geography of much of South Africa's Gauteng province. The town of Brakpan, within which the suburb is located, sits at an approximate elevation of 1,631 metres (5,351 ft) above sea level. This high altitude is a key factor influencing both the local topography, which is generally flat or gently undulating, and the regional climate. The area experiences a Subtropical Highland climate (classified as Cwb under the Köppen-Geiger system), which is typical of the Highveld region. This climate is characterised by warm, wet summers and cool, dry winters.

== Politics ==
In the 2024 South African national elections, Helderwyk Extension 8 (Voting District 33030672, Ward 105) recorded the following results:

- African National Congress (ANC): 36.58%
- uMkhonto weSizwe Party (MK Party): 22.49%
- Economic Freedom Fighters (EFF): 21.45%
- Democratic Alliance (DA): 9.43%
- ActionSA: 2.59%

These results reflect a diverse political landscape and shifting voter dynamics in the suburb.
