= Jakkals Keevy =

South African rugby union player

- Born: Albert Charles Keevy; 12 November 1917 Pretoria, South Africa
- Died: 9 February 1990 (aged 72) Vereeniging, South Africa
- Height: 1.75 m (5 ft 9 in)
- Weight: 73 kg (11 st 7 lb)
- Occupation: foreman plumber

Rugby union career
- Position(s): Fullback, Flyhalf
Amateur team(s)
Years	Team	Apps	(Points)
- Brakpan RFC
Provincial / State sides
Years	Team	Apps	(Points)
1942–45	Orange Free State		
1945–≥1951	Eastern Transvaal		
≤1953	Eastern Province		
International career
Years	Team	Apps	(Points)
1951	South Africa	0	(0)

Albert Charles Keevy (12 November 1917 – 9 February 1990), better known as Jakkals Keevy, was a South African rugby union player, most often playing as a fullback, though sometimes utilised at flyhalf. Keevy played club rugby for Brakpan and provincial rugby for both Orange Free State and Eastern Transvaal. Although he was never capped for the South African national team he is still considered a Springbok as he undertook the 1951–52 South Africa rugby tour of Great Britain, Ireland and France. He represented South Africa in thirteen games of the tour, which saw the Springboks lose only once in 31 matches.

== Personal history ==
Keevy was born in the Pretoria District of South Africa in 1917. Born Albert Charles Keevy, he was universally known as "Jakkals", though he preferred to be called Johnny. At the time of the 1951 tour he was married with one son, working as a foreman plumber with the Brakpan Municipality.

Keevy died in Vereeniging on 9 February 1990, at the age of 72.

== Rugby career ==
Keevy began playing club rugby at around the age of sixteen, his main club being Brakpan RFC. By 1942, at province level, he was representing the Orange Free State, remaining with them until 1945 when he switched to Eastern Transvaal. He trialed for the 1949 South Africa tour of New Zealand, and again for the 1951–52 tour of Great Britain, Ireland and France, for which he was successful. Although Keevy played in thirteen games of the tour, he failed to be chosen for a single international, with the fullback position for all five Test games going to Johnny Buchler. Keevy was not alone in failing to face an international team, as the South African managers kept to a strict 'A' team for the Tests, leaving 12 members of the tour to miss out on the five big games against Scotland, Ireland, Wales, England and France.

Keevy was the oldest member of the touring squad, and his body suffered through his years of playing rugby. When Keevy attended the 1949 Pretoria trials, he had just come out of a plaster after breaking a small bone in his neck. Later that same season he was knocked unconscious in the annual Brakpan-Springs club match, waking in hospital with two broken vertebrae. One of his eyes was permanently out of focus from another injury, from which he suffered poor night vision. Keevy had seen his nose broken on four occasions and he suffered from so many sprains and breaks to his ankles he was forced to strap both ankles in bandages before every match for support.

His first match as a member of the Springboks was on 13 October 1951 facing a combined South West Counties side; the South Africans won 17–8. Keevey then found himself in a three match rotation with Buchler and Basie Viviers, missing two, playing one. Keevy played in wins over Llanelli and North East Counties, when an injury to Buchler meant that Keevy and Viviers were called upon more often. Keevy then played in the wins over Cambridge University and a joint Neath/Aberavon side, but a recovered Buchler was back for the Scotland encounter.

The game against North of Scotland on 28 November saw Keevy score his first points of the tour, converting a try from Viviers, who had been brought in at centre. This was followed with wins over Munster and a Combined Services team. By this time the coaches were relying on just Buchler and Keevy for the fullback position, but a second injury to Buchler saw Keevy play in five of the last eight matches, though in four of those games he was utilised as a fly-half.

On returning to South Africa, Keevy continued to play rugby, and in 1953 he faced a touring Australian team but now playing for Eastern Province. Keevy scored nine points in the encounter, which saw Australia triumph 15–12. He was never capped for his country.

== Bibliography ==
- Billot, John (1974). Springboks in Wales. Ferndale: Ron Jones Publications.
- Griffiths, John (1987). The Phoenix Book of International Rugby Records. London: Phoenix House. ISBN 0-460-07003-7.
- Parker, A.C. (1970). The Springboks, 1891–1970. London: Cassell & Company Ltd. ISBN 0-304-93591-3.
- Stent, R.K. (1952). The Fourth Springboks 1951–1952. London: Longmans, Green and Co.
