= City of Ekurhuleni Metropolitan Municipality =

Metropolitan municipality in South Africa

Ekurhuleni East Rand
- Metropolitan Municipality
- City of Ekurhuleni Metropolitan Municipality
- Nicknames: The East, East Rand
- Motto: Prosper in Peace
- Location in Gauteng
- Coordinates: 26°10′S 28°18′E
- Country: South Africa
- Province: Gauteng
- Seat: Germiston
- Wards: 101

Government
  - Type: Municipal council
  - Executive Mayor: Nkosindiphile Xhakaza (ANC)

Area
  - Total: 1,975 km^{2} (763 sq mi)

Population (2022)
  - Total: 4,066,691
  - Density: 2,059/km^{2} (5,333/sq mi)

Racial makeup (2022)
  - Black African: 85.3%
  - Coloured: 2.5%
  - Indian/Asian: 1.8%
  - White: 10.3%

First languages (2011)
  - Zulu: 28.6%
  - English: 11.9%
  - Afrikaans: 11.8%
  - Sepedi: 2.4%
  - Other: 45.3%
- Time zone: UTC+2 (SAST)
- Municipal code: EKU
- GDP: US$ 82.6 billion
- GDP per capita: US$ 24,468
- Website: www.ekurhuleni.gov.za

The City of Ekurhuleni Metropolitan Municipality (Zulu: UMasipala weDolobhakazi laseKurhuleni; Afrikaans: Ekurhuleni Metropolitaanse Munisipaliteit; Northern Sotho: Mmasepala wa Toropokgolo ya Ekurhuleni; Sotho: Masepala wa Toropohadi ya Ekurhuleni) is a metropolitan municipality that forms the local government of the East Rand region of Gauteng, a large suburban region east of Johannesburg. Ekurhuleni means "place of peace" in XiTsonga. Ekurhuleni is one of the five districts of Gauteng and one of the eight metropolitan municipalities of South Africa. The seat of Ekurhuleni is Germiston and the most spoken language is Zulu at 28.6%. The city is home to South Africa's busiest airport, OR Tambo International Airport, which is in the Kempton Park area of Ekurhuleni.

== History ==
The municipality was established in 2000, the result of a merger between the Eastern Gauteng Services Council, the Khayalami Metropolitan Council, and the previous municipalities of Alberton, Benoni, Boksburg, Brakpan, Edenvale/Lethabong, Germiston, Kempton Park/Tembisa, Nigel and Springs. The planned expansion of Ekurhuleni through the abolition of the Lesedi Local Municipality, which includes Heidelberg, and its absorption into Ekurhuleni after the 2016 municipal elections, were blocked by the High Court of South Africa in 2015.

The name Ekurhuleni meaning place of peace alludes to the fact that the East Rand townships were the site of severe political violence between supporters of the Inkatha Freedom Party and the ANC in the early 1990s, prior to South Africa's first non-racial elections in 1994.

== Geography ==
Ekurhuleni lies on the highveld plateau at about 1600 metres in altitude above sea level (asl). The highest elevation is at the Gillooly's Ridge – Bill Stewart Side – Fisher's Hill at 1772 metres asl. The lowest point is at 1552 metres asl. The city is rich in wetlands, pans, streams and rivers. The city is highly urbanised; however, the north especially has high-potential agricultural land.

== Climate ==
Ekurhuleni has a subtropical highland climate (Cwb) according to the Köppen-Geiger Climate classification. This is a temperate climate of warm summers and dry winters. In the winter months (May - October) the city has a diurnal temperature pattern with a high amplitude, as temperatures can range from freezing at night to mid 20s °C in the day.

The main precipitation falls between October and March with a monthly average precipitation of up to 148 mm which falls usually in convective thundershowers. The daily maximum temperatures in October–March are on average 27 °C. The Winter is mostly dry with only a few cold fronts reaching the highveld from the southern Atlantic Ocean.

Climate data for Ekurhuleni
Month	Jan	Feb	Mar	Apr	May	Jun	Jul	Aug	Sep	Oct	Nov	Dec	Year
Record high °C (°F)	33.8 (92.8)	33.5 (92.3)	35.2 (95.4)	29.4 (84.9)	29.2 (84.6)	28.8 (83.8)	24.5 (76.1)	27.0 (80.6)	33.0 (91.4)	32.5 (90.5)	33.6 (92.5)	33.0 (91.4)	35.2 (95.4)
Mean daily maximum °C (°F)	32 (90)	32 (90)	30 (86)	27 (81)	25 (77)	22 (72)	22 (72)	26 (79)	30 (86)	32 (90)	32 (90)	32 (90)	28.5 (83.3)
Daily mean °C (°F)	27 (81)	27 (81)	26 (79)	23 (73)	21 (70)	18 (64)	18 (64)	21 (70)	25 (77)	26 (79)	27 (81)	27 (81)	24 (75)
Mean daily minimum °C (°F)	14 (57)	13 (55)	13 (55)	10 (50)	6 (43)	2 (36)	2 (36)	4 (39)	8 (46)	11 (52)	13 (55)	14 (57)	9 (48)
Record low °C (°F)	6 (43)	0 (32)	1 (34)	−1 (30)	−5 (23)	−7 (19)	−6 (21)	−7 (19)	−3 (27)	2 (36)	1 (34)	0 (32)	−7 (19)
Average rainfall mm (inches)	132 (5.2)	86 (3.4)	79 (3.1)	41 (1.6)	13 (0.5)	5 (0.2)	2 (0.1)	7 (0.3)	20 (0.8)	85 (3.3)	114 (4.5)	142 (5.6)	726 (28.6)
Average rainy days (≥ 1.0 mm)	21	16.5	14.8	7.5	2.9	1.5	0.6	1.9	5.3	15.5	19.1	22.9	129.5
Mean monthly sunshine hours	250.1	224.8	238.8	236.9	276.0	266.9	283.9	284.1	280.8	269.5	248.7	263.9	3,124.4
Source 1: meteoblue
Source 2: World Meteorological Organisation (UN)

== Main places ==
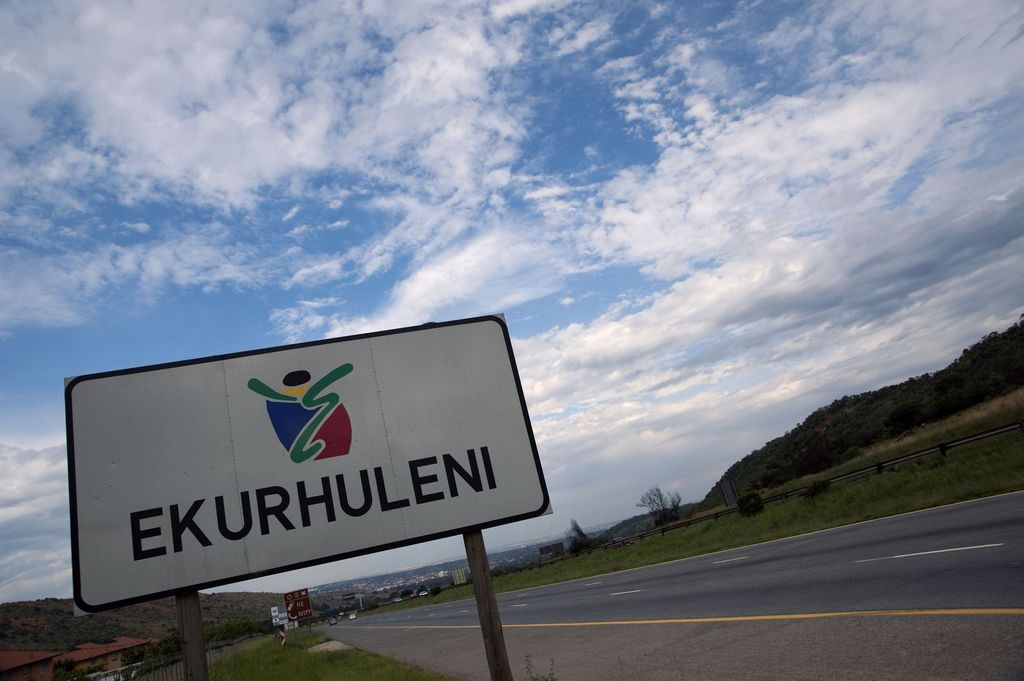
Road sign: Ekurhuleni

Ekurhuleni 2001 population density map

The 2011 census divided the municipality into inter alia the following main places:

Place	Area (km^{2})	Population	Most spoken languages
Alberton	77.16	121,536	Afrikaans 42%, English 34%, Zulu 6%, Sotho 5%, Xhosa 2%, foreign languages 2%
Benoni	175.55	158,777	English 41%, Afrikaans 19%, Zulu 17%, Pedi 5%, Sotho 3%, Tsonga 3%, foreign languages 3%, Xhosa 2%, Ndebele 2%
Boksburg	162.35	260,321	Afrikaans 28%, English 18%, Zulu 14%, Pedi 9%, Xhosa 8%, Sotho 7%, Tsonga 4%, foreign languages 3%
Brakpan	182.81	73,080	Afrikaans 47%, English 16%, Zulu 14%, Sotho 4%, Pedi 3%, foreign languages 2%, Tsonga 2%, Xhosa 2%, Tswana 2%
Daveyton	14.45	127,967	Zulu 37%, Pedi 13%, Xhosa 11%, Sotho 10%, Tsonga 9%, Tswana 5%, Ndebele 3%, English 2%, foreign languages 2%
Duduza	11.23	73,295	Zulu 64%, Sotho 16%, Xhosa 5%, Pedi 2%, Tswana 2%
Edenvale	20.03	49,292	English 72%, Afrikaans 11%, foreign languages 4%, Zulu 3%
Etwatwa	20.83	151,866	Zulu 44%, Tsonga 12%, Pedi 12%, Sotho 7%, Xhosa 6%, Ndebele 6%, Swazi 2%, Tswana 2%
Germiston	143.27	255,863	English 24%, Afrikaans 16%, Zulu 16%, Xhosa 9%, Pedi 7%, Sotho 7%, foreign languages 5%, Tsonga 4%, Venda 2%, Tswana 2%
Helderwyk Extension 8	0.00010977	3,613	Zulu 48%, Sotho 30%, Xhosa 12%, Tswana 6%, Afrikaans 4%
Katlehong	55.36	407,294	Zulu 37%, Sotho 22%, Xhosa 13%, Pedi 9%, Tsonga 6%, English 2%
Kempton Park	149.05	171,575	Afrikaans 34%, English 26%, Zulu 8%, Pedi 7%, foreign languages 4%, Sotho 4%, Tswana 3%, Xhosa 3%, Tsonga 2%
Kwa-Thema	14.70	103,727	Zulu 55%, Xhosa 8%, Sotho 7%, Pedi 7%, Tswana 6%, Ndebele 4%, Tsonga 2%, English 2%, Swazi 2%
Langaville	10.10	54,710	Zulu 46%, Pedi 11%, Tsonga 10%, Xhosa 8%, Sotho 6%, Ndebele 4%, Swazi 3%, English 2%, Tswana 2%
Nigel	139.07	38,318	Afrikaans 43%, Zulu 23%, English 16%, Sotho 5%, Xhosa 2%
Springs	183.50	121,610	Afrikaans 30%, Zulu 20%, English 15%, Pedi 8%, Xhosa 7%, Sotho 5%, Tsonga 3%, foreign languages 3%, Tswana 2%
Thembisa	42.08	463,109	Pedi 33%, Zulu 21%, Tsonga 13%, Xhosa 7%, Sotho 6%, Tswana 3%, Ndebele 3%, Venda 3%, foreign languages 2%, English 2%
Tokoza	9.43	105,827	Zulu 40%, Sotho 21%, Xhosa 18%, Pedi 5%, Tsonga 3%
Tsakane	19.75	135,994	Zulu 57%, Sotho 10%, Pedi 7%, Xhosa 6%, Tsonga 4%, Tswana 3%, Ndebele 3%, English 2%
Vosloorus	32.10	163,216	Zulu 46%, Sotho 17%, Xhosa 8%, Pedi 7%, Tsonga 5%, Tswana 4%, English 3%
Wattville	2.17	25,667	Zulu 47%, Sotho 13%, Pedi 10%, Xhosa 7%, Tswana 5%, Tsonga 5%, English 2%, foreign languages 2%, Ndebele 2%

== Parks and nature ==
Germiston Lake is a natural pan in the Elsburgspruit system and has a catchment area of 1174ha. It is fed mostly by surface runoff water and storm water drains. The lake is one of the cleanest bodies of water in South Africa. It has a size of 57.4 ha and a maximum capacity of 2839×$10^6 m^3$. Its depth is approximately 8 metres. On the banks of the lake are a recreational park with playground equipment and braai areas as well as a rowing club and golf club.

A wetland of note is the Blesbokriver wetland which stretches over an area of 1858ha.

The Bullfrog Pan is almost 10 hectares and is home to more than 150 bird species.

=== Landmarks ===
In 2017, the Chris Hani memorial at Thomas Nkobi Memorial Park in Boksburg was revealed during the 22nd commemoration of his death. The Chris Hani memorial site consists of the Monument, the Walk of Remembrance and the Wall of Remembrance which recognizes the historical events, places and people associated with the liberation struggle of South Africa.

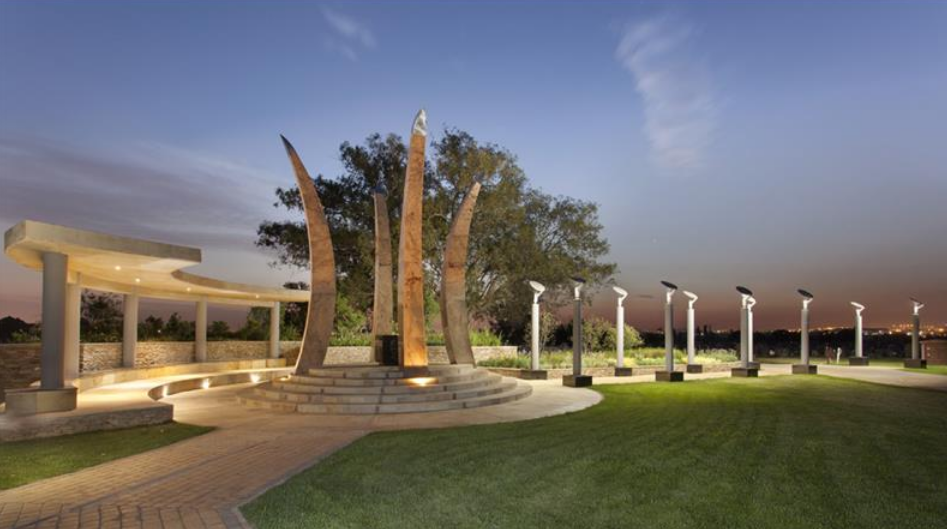
Chris Hani Monument in Boksburg, Ekurhuleni

The Thokoza Wall of Remembrance commemorates the people who died in the fight between the Inkatha Freedom Party and the residents.

== Arts and culture ==
In 2017, the Thami Mnyele Fine arts award had its 30th anniversary.

O.R. Tambo Narrative Centre tells visitors all about the lives and contributions of the Oliver Tambo and Adelaide Tambo towards the dismantling of Apartheid in South Africa. It is situated on the banks of the Leeupan Wetland. It also has an exhibition of environmental education aimed at children.

Since 2016, Ekurhuleni has hosted the Ekurhuleni International Film Festival.

== Demographics ==
In 2016, 3,379,104 people lived in Ekurhuleni, of whom 22.7% were under 15 years old, 71.2% were between the ages of 15-64 and 6.1% were older than 65 years old. Ekurhuleni had 1,299,490 households with an average people per household number of 2.6. 80.2% of people lived in formal dwellings and 52.9% owned housing.

The following statistics are from the 2001 census.

Ekurhuleni 2001 dominant language map

Population pyramid 2011
%	Males	Age	Females	%
0.53		75+		0.89
0.65		70–74		0.74
1.04		65–69		1.07
1.46		60–64		1.47
1.95		55–59		1.91
2.37		50–54		2.26
3.02		45–49		2.65
3.72		40–44		3.18
4.87		35–39		4.18
5.75		30–34		5.05
5.59		25–29		5.13
4.04		20–24		4.01
3.21		15–19		3.29
3.67		10–14		3.69
4.41		5–9		4.40
4.87		0–4		4.90

Language	Population	%
IsiZulu	908 002	28.81%
English	377 935	11.99%
Afrikaans	375 611	11.8%
Sepedi	359 245	11.40%
Sesotho	315 806	10.02%
IsiXhosa	252 757	8.02%
XiTsonga	208 865	6.63%
Setswana	90 307	2.87%
Other	81 878	2.60%
IsiNdebele	75 150	2.38%
Tshivenda	48 227	1.53%
SiSwati	44 967	1.43%
Sign Language	.	0.4%

=== Gender ===
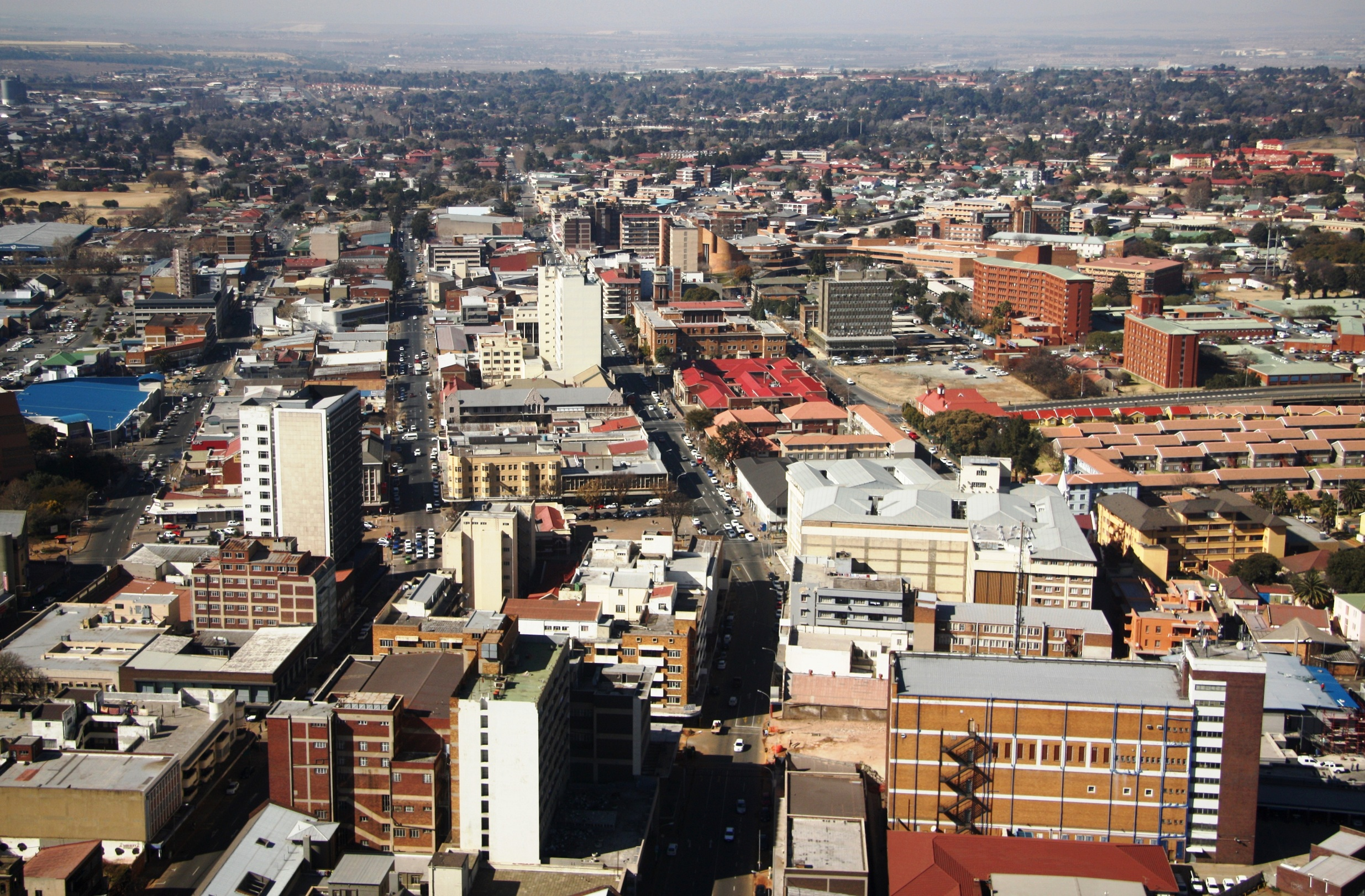
Germiston

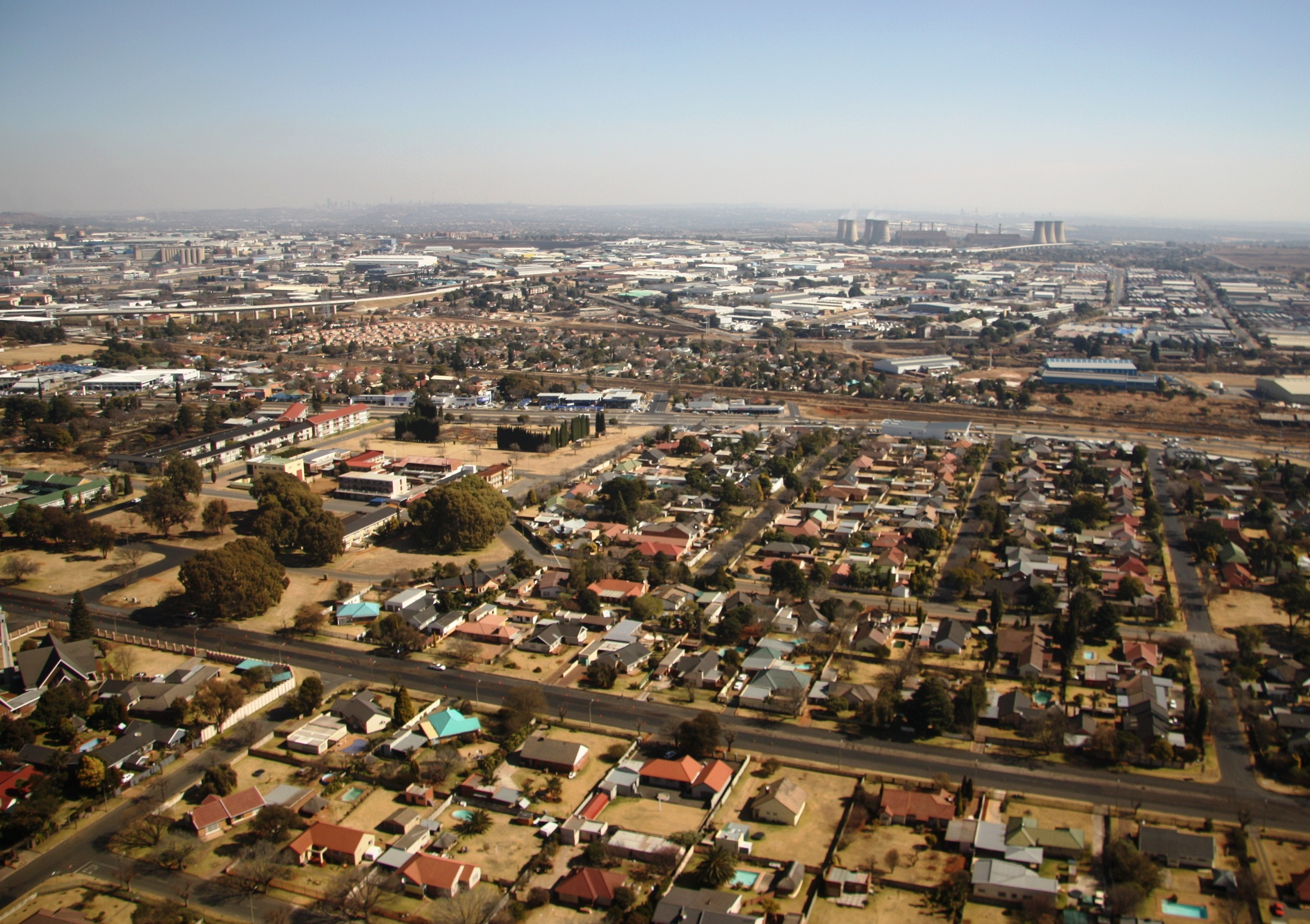
The Rhodesfield suburb of Kempton Park

Gender	Population	%
Male	1 627 724	52.21%
Female	1 550 747	47.79%

=== Ethnic groups ===
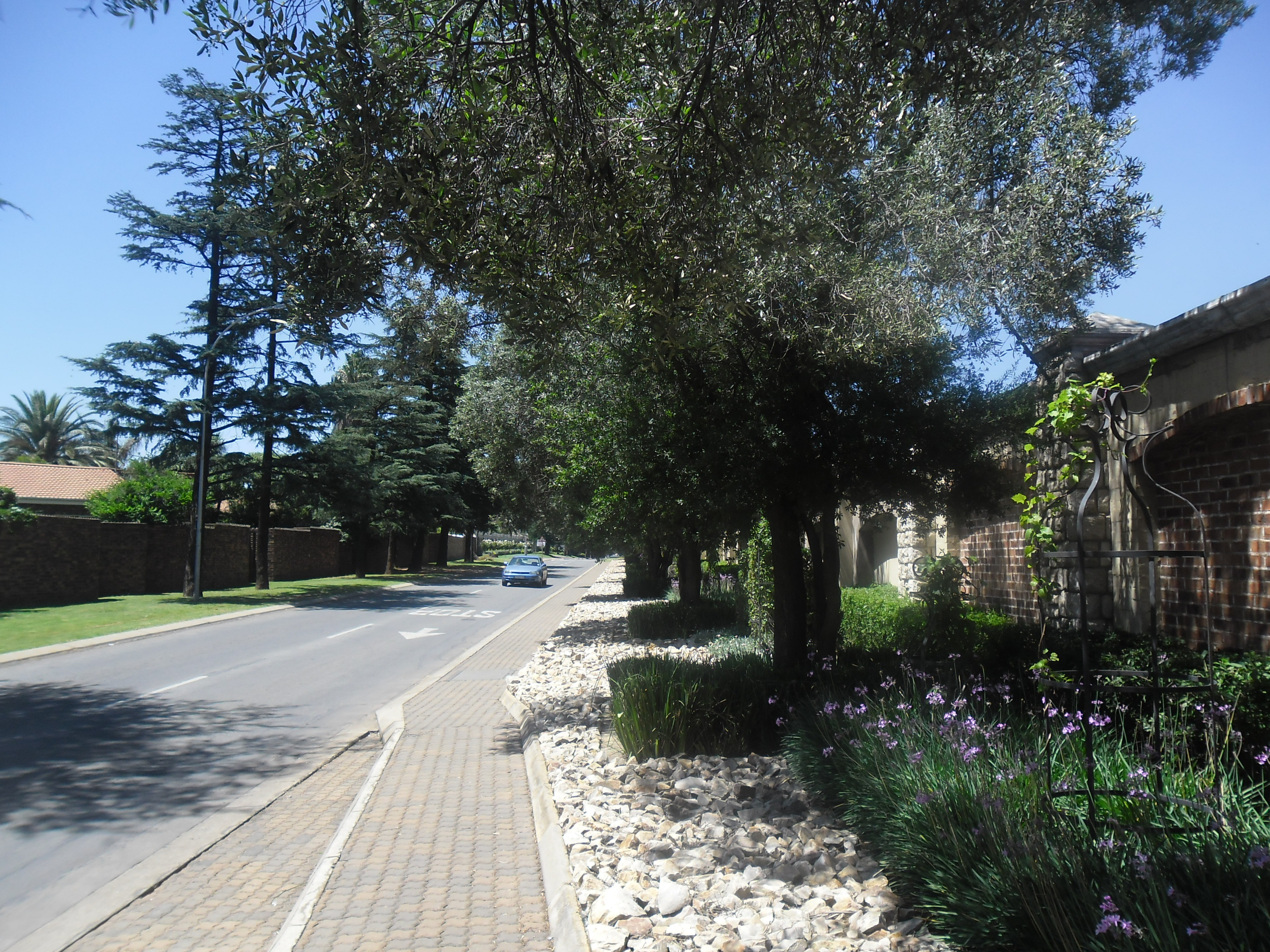
A street in Lakefield

Ethnic group	Population	%
Black African	2 502 769	78.74%
White	502 439	15.81%
Coloured	85 910	2.70%
Indian/Asian	68 058	2.14%

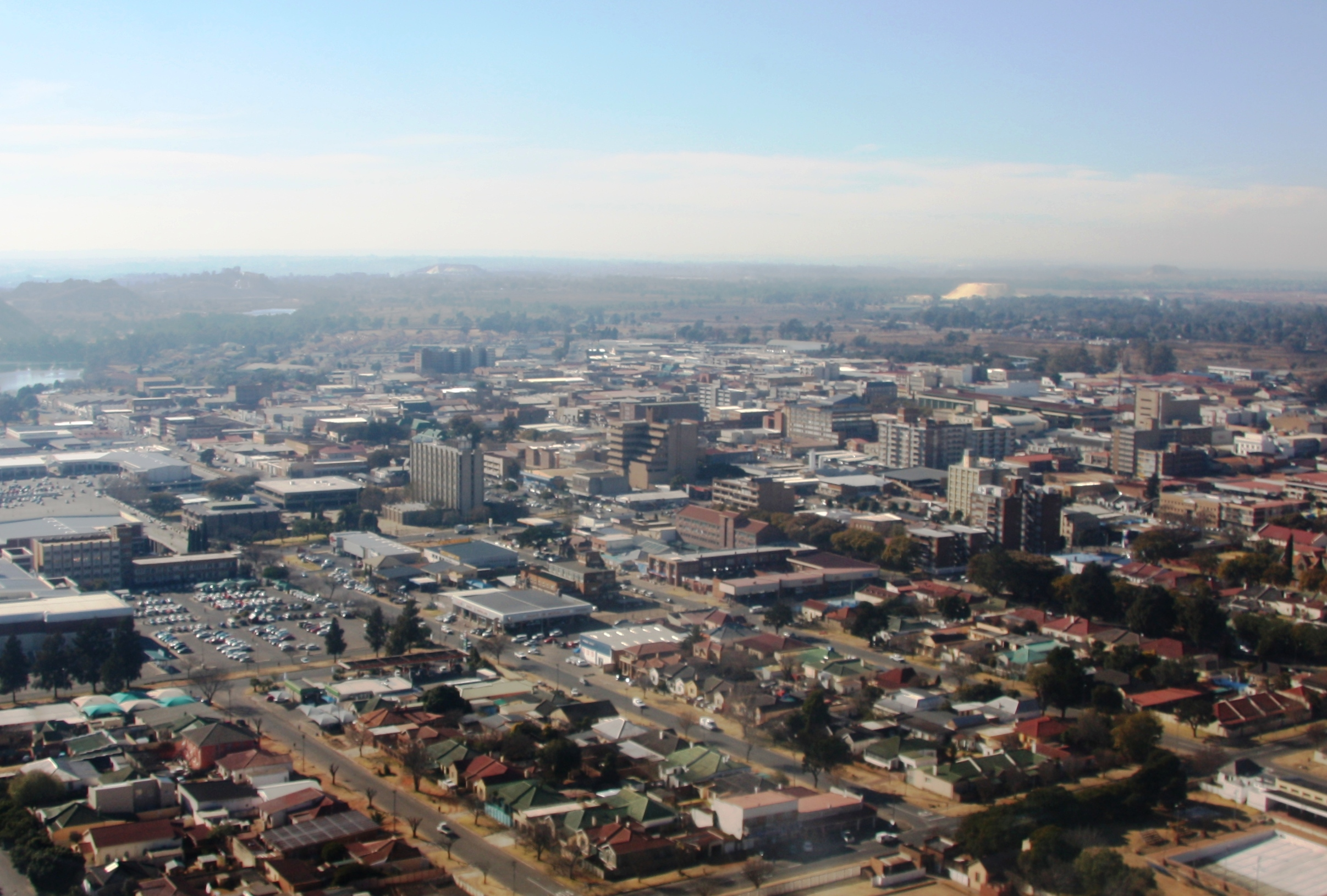
The CBD of Benoni

== Education ==
Ekurhuleni has two school districts: Ekurhuleni North and Ekurhuleni South. There are 671 schools in Ekurhuleni, of which 137 are independent. Ekurhuleni has two colleges of further education and training (FET) as well as two centres of adult education and training (AET). The municipal government under Executive Mayor Mzwandile Masina conducted a feasibility study and lobbied the national government to establish a university in Ekurhuleni which was formally announced by President Cyril Ramaphosa in the 2020 State of the Nation Address.

== Controversies ==
Police are investigating the R5.2 million paid for consultation work that was never done.

=== Ekurhuleni Metropolitan Police Department Crimes and Corruption ===
On 11 November 2025, acting Ekurhuleni Metropolitan Police Department head Julius Mkhwanazi was suspended following damning allegations at the Madlanga Commission. Witnesses from the EMPD testified and gave evidence that linked Mkhwanazi to a murder case and accused him of running a rogue unit allegedly involved in extortion, kidnapping, theft, and truck hijackings in and around Gauteng. Mkhwanazi was also mentioned to have played a major part in having Vusimuzi Matlala, a controversial businessman who is currently behind bars, sign an agreement between the EMPD and Matlala's security company, which did not follow the correct protocols.

Among others, allegations levelled against Mkhwanazi include being an accessory to a murder. This murder happened on 15 April 2022 in the Brakpan area. It is alleged that the victim was tortured on the scene was body was dumped in a dam on Mkhwananzi's instruction.

During the commission hearings, a video was shown of Mkhwananzi and the rogue unit raiding a factory in Meyerton, outside their operation boundaries. Mkhwanazi and these EMPD officers stole copper at a workshop in August 2022. Jaco Hanekom, a supervisor and whistleblower who exposed the EMPD operation at the said workshop, was later killed in March 2023 after the EMPD officers who were arrested were granted bail.

EMPD's specialised services unit, under Mkhwanazi's command is linked to a theft of a truck and its load in Putfontein, Benoni, and the kidnapping of the driver, in March 2023.

It is also alleged that Mkhwananzi and his rogue unit was involved in the Precious Stones case, which occurred in the Hillbrow-Kensington area in 2024, where police are accused of stealing precious stones worth R45-million.

== Governance and politics ==
The governance of Ekurhuleni is set out by Chapter 7 of the Constitution of South Africa which governs the operation and function of local government in South Africa. The Local Government: Municipal Structures Act 117 of 1998 states that the minister responsible for local government, namely the Minister of Cooperative Governance and Traditional Affairs, is responsible for the designation of municipalities. As per the act and regulations issued by the Minister, Ekurhuleni is designated as a category A municipality and is thus a metropolitan municipality. The external boundaries of the municipality and subsequently the remit of the jurisdiction of the metropolitan government is regulated by the Municipal Demarcation Board.

In April 2011, the council approved the separation of the legislative and executive functions of the metropolitan government. Under Section 56 of the Municipal Structures Act, the Executive Mayor is responsible for directing and monitoring, and presiding over Mayoral Committee. The Mayoral Committee comprises the administrative branch of the municipality and is responsible for bringing to effect the by-laws of the Municipal Council, administering the responsibilities designated by national and provincial legislation, as well as providing for the political oversight for the functioning of the city structures. A professional civil servant known as the City Manager, is responsible for the technical and managerial direction and oversight of the municipality.

In 2014/2015, the city ranked highest out of all metros in South Africa in the Business Day Index, measuring how well cities and towns spend resident's money.

The municipal council consists of 224 members elected by mixed-member proportional representation. Of these 224, 112 are elected by first-past-the-post voting in 112 wards, while the remaining 112 are chosen from party lists so that the total number of party representatives is proportional to the number of votes received. In the 2021 South African municipal election, no party obtained a majority of seats on the council.

The following table shows the results of the 2026 election.

Party	Ward			List			Total seats
Party	Votes	%	Seats	Votes	%	Seats	Total seats
Democratic Alliance	274,209	30.96	34	270,540	30.41	32	66
African National Congress	196,488	22.19	59	196,007	22.03	0	59
ActionSA	151,342	17.09	17	177,092	19.90	23	40
uMkhonto weSizwe Party	61,196	6.91	0	63,415	7.13	15	15
Economic Freedom Fighters	59,530	6.72	0	55,622	6.25	14	14
Freedom Front Plus	44,169	4.99	0	43,695	4.91	11	11
Patriotic Alliance	14,788	1.67	2	12,699	1.43	1	3
Inkatha Freedom Party	10,588	1.20	0	10,175	1.14	3	3
South African Communist Party	8,180	0.92	0	6,017	0.68	2	2
African Transformation Movement	5,872	0.66	0	6,809	0.77	2	2
Rise Mzansi	6,056	0.68	0	4,912	0.55	2	2
Afrika Mayibuye Movement	5,315	0.60	0	4,390	0.49	1	1
African Independent Congress	4,707	0.53	0	3,544	0.40	1	1
Pan Africanist Congress of Azania	4,009	0.45	0	2,985	0.34	1	1
African Christian Democratic Party	3,367	0.38	0	3,570	0.40	1	1
Independent candidates	4,949	0.56	0				0
Build One South Africa	2,858	0.32	0	2,081	0.23	1	1
The Movement for Social Justice	2,043	0.23	0	1,749	0.20	1	1
United Africans Transformation	1,533	0.17	0	2,145	0.24	1	1
64 other parties	24,445	2.76	0	22,295	2.51	0	0
Total	885,644	100.00	112	889,742	100.00	112	224
Valid votes	885,644	97.88		889,742	98.10		
Invalid/blank votes	19,195	2.12		17,203	1.90		
Total votes	904,839	100.00		906,945	100.00		
Registered voters/turnout	1,711,998	52.85		1,711,998	52.98		

== Economy ==
As of 2014, the GDP of Ekurhuleni was estimated at over US$55 billion (PPP), being US$17,361 per person. Ekurhuleni has an active workforce of 1.6 million people of whom 28.8% are unemployed. Ekurhuleni makes up 6.2% of national production.

Ekurhuleni is home to the Rand Refinery, the largest integrated single-site precious metals refining and smelting complex in the world and

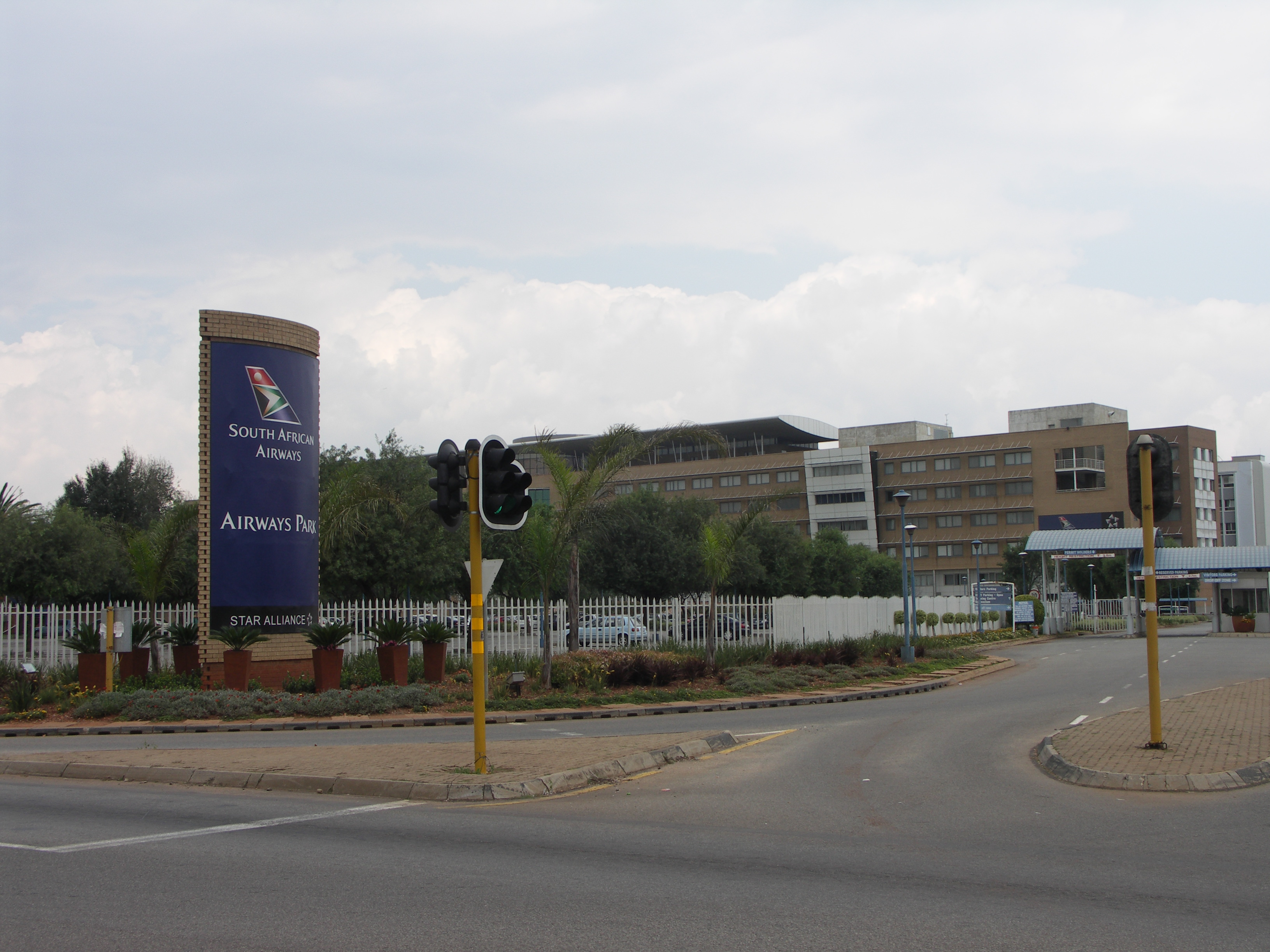
Airways Park, the head office of South African Airways

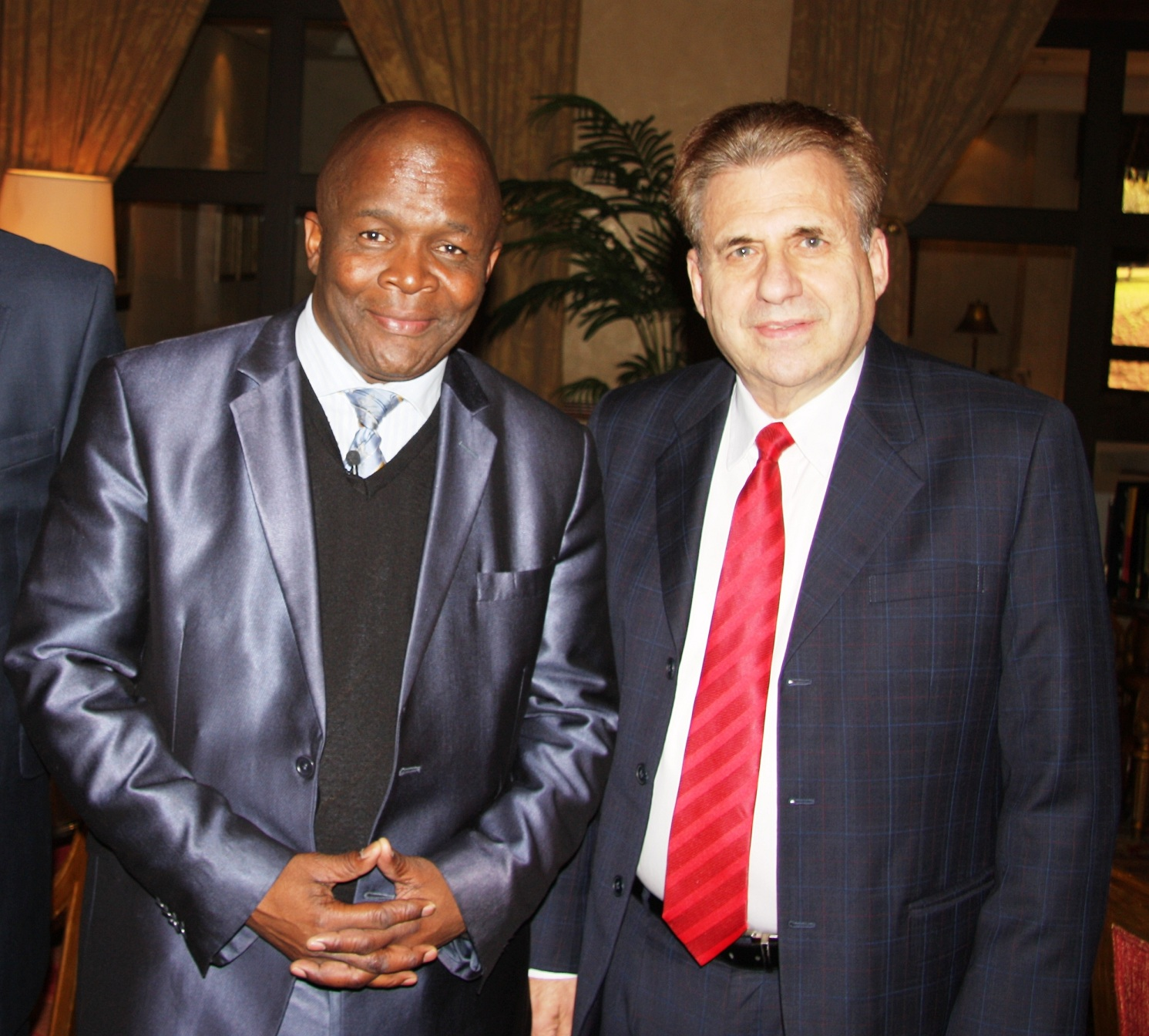
Professor John D. Kasarda.

=== Manufacturing ===
The city is an important manufacturing centre in South Africa, contributing 32% of manufacturing production. The city has been described as "the workshop of the country". It contributes 11% to the GVA of South Africa.

Ekurhuleni has held the "Manufacturing Indaba" Conference every year since 2014. This two-day conference provides contacts and networking between business owners, industry owners, capital providers, experts and the government.

== Infrastructure ==
=== Road network ===
Ekurhuleni is connected to the main motorways in South Africa via the M2, N3, N17, R21, R24 and R59 highways. As Ekurhuleni is part of the Johannesburg Conurbation, Transport routes in Ekurhuleni share the same metropolitan route numbering system as Johannesburg.

The road network in Ekurhuleni spans 8,024 km of paved roads and approximately 1,200 km of gravel road.

=== Public transport ===
Ekurhuleni is one of 13 cities and towns in South Africa to implement the bus rapid transit (BRT) system. Phase 1 of the project runs from Tembisa to Vosloorus via Kempton Park and the OR Tambo International Airport. New routes have been integrated from Katlehong to Rhodesfield, from Vosloorus to Rhodesfield, and from Reiger Park to Rhodesfield. Passengers are served by Metrorail which sustains the passenger rail network in the Western Cape, Gauteng, KwaZulu-Natal and the Eastern Cape. Seven train lines serve Ekurhuleni.

=== Rail ===
Ekurhuleni has the largest rail hub in South Africa used by Transnet.

=== Aviation ===
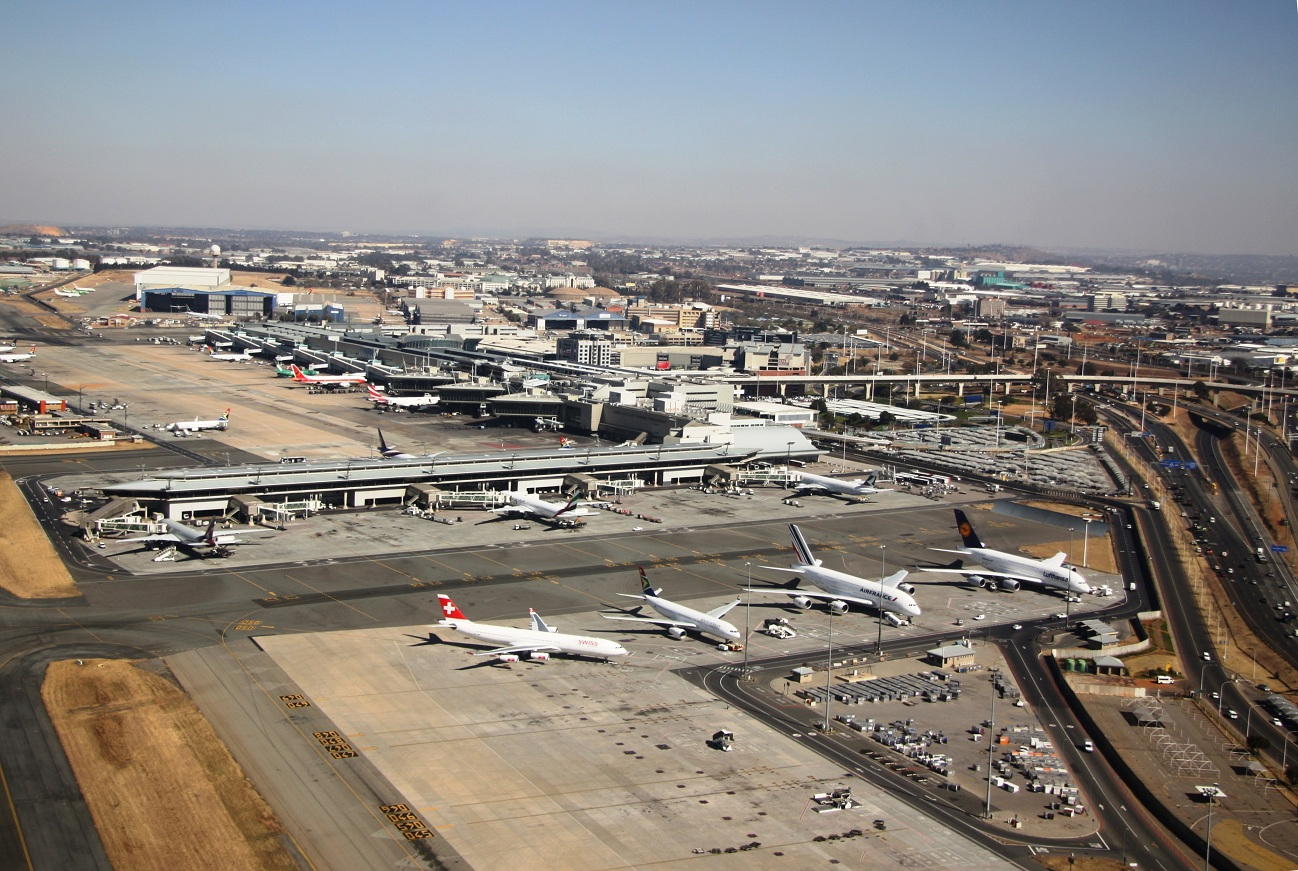
Ekurhuleni aerotropolis

Several airline companies are headquartered in the Kempton Park area of Ekurhuleni.

Ekurhuleni is Gauteng's first aerotropolis. This is a metropolis with an airport at its centre. One should be able to get to the airport from anywhere in Ekurhuleni in 25 min. The major aim will be logistics and connecting the local industry and agriculture to the world markets.

O.R. Tambo International Airport has two terminals handling domestic and international flights. Terminal A handles international traffic and Terminal B domestic flights. The airport services airlines from all five continents and plays a vital role in serving the local, regional, intra- and inter-continental air transport needs of South Africa and sub-Saharan Africa. It is the biggest and busiest airport in Africa. OR Tambo International handles more than 20 million passengers per year and employs more than 18,000 people.

South African Airways, the flagship air carrier of South Africa, had its head office in Ekurhuleni.

Federal Air has its headquarters on the OR Tambo International Airport grounds. Safair's head office is in Kempton Park.

Airports Company South Africa has its head office in Bedfordview, Ekurhuleni. TAAG Angola Airlines has an office in Bedfordview.

=== Stormwater systems ===
There are 11,318 storm water systems and a total lengths of pipes and channels of more than 3800 km.

== Sports and recreation ==
Ekurhuleni has at least 16 golf courses and is home to the international Golf Tournament the South African Open held at Glendower Golf Club.

There is an over 100 year old rowing club at the bank of Germiston Lake, and over 30 swimming pools can be found in the city.

Ekurhuleni United FC play in the fourth division of South African Football.

Ekurhuleni has the Ekurhuleni masters league, a soccer league of retired pros and talented players who did not make the cut.

38 eco "outdoor gyms" can be found in Ekurhuleni.

== Management ==
In 2021, Eskom identified Ekurhuleni as a municipality with a poor payment record, with its debt at the time amounting to R8 million.

In July 2025, a new taxi rank completed three months earlier for R17 million had not yet been used, with taxi operators claiming they had not been consulted.

== Notable people from Ekurhuleni ==
- Lood de Jager
- Ernie Els
- Chris Hani
- Jakkals Keevy
- Sibusiso Khumalo
- Kelly Khumalo
- Kwesta
- Rebecca Malope
- Lebo Mathosa
- Senzo Meyiwa
- Pearl Modiadie
- Nthati Moshesh
- Japie Mulder
- Emmanuel Asanda 'Scara' Ngobese
- Khethi Ngwenya
- Chris Rossouw (rugby union born 1969)
- Oliver Tambo
- Jaco Taute
- Charlize Theron
