= Jan Lotz =

South African rugby union player

- Born: Jan Willem Lotz; 26 August 1910 Krugersdorp, South Africa
- Died: 13 August 1986 (aged 75)
- Height: 1.83 m (6 ft 0 in)
- Weight: 92 kg (203 lb)
- School: Krugersdorp High School

Rugby union career
- Position: Hooker
Provincial / State sides
| Years | Team | Apps | (Points) |
| – | Transvaal | | |
International career
| Years | Team | Apps | (Points) |
| 1937–38 | South Africa | 8 | (3) |
| 1937 | South Africa (tour) | 18 | (3) |

Jan Willem Lotz (26 August 1910 – 13 August 1986) was a South African rugby union player.

== Playing career ==
Lotz played provincial rugby for the Transvaal in the South African Currie Cup competition. He played his first test matches for South Africa on 26 June 1937 against the Wallabies at the Sydney Cricket Ground. During 1937 and 1938 he played in all 8 test matches played by the Springboks and was a member of the 1937 Springbok touring team to Australia and New Zealand, which won the test series against both countries. He played his last test match against the British Isles on 10 September 1938 at Newlands in Cape Town.

== See also ==
- List of South Africa national rugby union players – Springbok no. 255
