= Khethi Ngwenya =

South African entrepreneur and philanthropist

- Born: Khethi Ngwenya; 25 March 1991 (age 34); Soweto, South Africa
- Occupations: Founder and Managing Director of SchoolMedia Co-Founder and Chairman of ContiLube SA

Khethi Ngwenya (born 25 March 1991 in Soweto) is a South African entrepreneur and businessman. He is the founder and managing director of SchoolMedia South Africa's largest Media and community upliftment company within Schools across South Africa. He is also the co-founder of Contilube-SA as well as the Acting Deputy Curator of the Johannesburg Global Shapers Forum.

== Early life ==
Khethi Ngwenya was born on 25 March 1991 in Soweto South of Johannesburg to Mapula and Jabu Ngwenya and spend most of his early years in Mofolo Soweto and in Witbank. At a young age he started selling hair products in his aunt’s salon to make extra money during school holidays. At 12 he decided to open his own stall selling firecrackers to the local community. At a later stage he moved with his family to Alberton and at 16 joined the Soweto Business Chamber’s organisation, Young Entrepreneurs of Soweto, becoming the CEO at 17.

== Significant events and achievements ==
An initiative with his company SchoolMedia has led to over 4 500 trees being planted across Gauteng, South Africa over a 4-year period. In 2012 he started another initiative with the support of Adidas and Orlando Pirates, which has placed 40 new football Goalposts in 20 schools and provided school children with opportunities to meet Orlando Pirates stars like Benni McCarthy and Daine Klate, or play a 5-a-side game with these professional athletes.

== Awards ==
In 2013 he was one of the finalist in the Talk Radio 702 Small business awards.

In 2017 he was listed the 41st most influential young South African.

== Personal life ==
Khethi is a polyglot; he speaks several languages including English, Zulu, Sotho, Tswana, Swati, Afrikaans and some Italian and Portuguese. He is a Christian and a member of the Catholic church. He is of Swati and Pedi ethnicity.

== See also ==
- List of South Africans
- Global Shapers
