= Zamani =

Zamani is a word with multiple uses across both Asia and Africa. It is often related to time and the past (Turkish: Zamanı; Persian: زمانی).

== Places ==
- Zamani, South African township near Memel, Free State

=== Iran ===
- Zahmani, small village in Horr Rural District in western Iran
- Zamani Mahalleh, small village in Asalem Rural District in north-western Iran
- Zamani, Iran, small village in Sedeh Rural District in eastern Iran
- Qaleh-ye Juq Zamani, village in Boghrati Rural District in western Iran
- Khan Jamal-e Zamani, village in Bavaleh Rural District in western Iran
- Hemmatabad-e Zamani, town in Takht-e Jolgeh Rural District in eastern Iran
- Aghcheh Kohal-e Zamani, small village in Ujan-e Sharqi Rural District in western Iran
- Chapar Pord-e Zaman, village in northern Iran
- Rudbar-e Mohammad-e Zamani Rural District, district in Qazvin Province

== People ==
- Zamani Lekwot (born 1944), former Military Governor of Rivers State, Nigeria
- Asifa Zamani, Indian scholar in Persian language
- Mahla Zamani, Iranian fashion designer and journalist
- Alireza Zamani (born 1994), Iranian arachnologist
- Malika-uz-Zamani (1703–1789), Empress of the Mughal Empire
- Mariam-uz-Zamani (1542–1623), Empress of the Mughal Empire
- Mahdi Zamani (born 1992), Scientific image specialist, science communicator & photographer
- Mehdi Zamani (born 1989), Iranian sprint athlete
- Mohammad Hashem Zamani (1928–2005), Afghan poet
- Mohammad-Reza Ali-Zamani (?–2010), executed Iranian political activist
- Mohd Norhafiz Zamani Misbah (born 1981), Malaysian soccer player
- Mosleh Zamani (1980s–2009), executed Iranian minor
- Mostafa Zamani (born 1982), Iranian actor
- Panshak Zamani (born 1986), Nigerian hiphop artist known as Ice Prince
- Roia Zamani, Afghan female taekwondo practitioner
- Saman Aghazamani (born 1989), Iranian soccer player
- Zamani Ibrahim (born 1971), Malaysian Singer

== Others ==
- Av Zamanı, 1988 Turkish drama film known in English as Hunting Time
- Sasha and Zamani, African time concept
- Shuwa-Zamani language, a Kainji language of Nigeria
- Zamani Project, African cultural heritage database

== See also ==
- Zaman (disambiguation)
- Zamania, city in Uttar Pradesh, India
- Zamanil, alternative name for Oxyphencyclimine
