= List of Ramsar sites in South Africa =

This list of Ramsar sites in South Africa are wetland environs that are considered to be of international importance, and protected under the Ramsar Convention. As of 2024, South Africa has 30 such sites covering 574 028 hectares.

For a complete list of all Ramsar sites worldwide, see the List of Ramsar wetlands of international importance.

== List of Ramsar sites ==
Name	Location	Description	Image	Area (km^{2})	Designated	Ref.
Barberspan	Delareyville 26°35′S 25°35′E	A 5 km long and 2.5km wide, permanent, alkaline, freshwater lake, surrounded by grassland.		31.18	12/03/1975	
Berg Estuary	Velddrif 32°51′S 18°15′E	Wetland mudflat vegetation in a flood plain that contains 127 waterbird species.		11.63	01/02/2022	
Blesbokspruit	Marievale Bird Sanctuary 26°18′S 28°30′E	Permanently inundated section of the Blesbokspruit River. Important for several locally migrant waterbird species and various mammals.		18.58	02/10/1986	
Bot - Kleinmond Estuarine System	Kleinmond 34°20′S 19°06′E	An estuarine lake recognised as one of the ten most important wetlands for waterbirds in South Africa; 86 species have been recorded here. It's also a nursery for 41 species of fish.		13.50	31/01/2017	
Dassen Island Nature Reserve	Dassen Island 33°25′S 018°05′E	Important Bird Area for 10 of the 15 endemic sea birds in Southern Africa; including the critically endangered African penguin and Cape cormorant.		7.37	29/03/2019	
De Berg Nature Reserve	Dullstroom 25°12′42″S 30°08′48″E	A high-altitude catchment area along the Dwars River that includes diverse and endemic ecosystems types. Classified as a Critical Biodiversity Area for endangered species such as the grey crowned crane, black harrier and southern bald ibis.		12.65	02/02/2024	
De Hoop Vlei	De Hoop Nature Reserve 34°27′S 020°23′E			7.5	12/03/1975	
De Mond	De Mond Nature Reserve 34°42′S 020°06′E			9.18	02/10/1986	
Dyer Island Nature Reserve Complex	Dyer Island / Geyser Island 34°41′S 019°24′E			2.88	29/03/2019	
False Bay Nature Reserve	Zeekoevlei 34°03′S 018°29′E			15.42	02/02/2015	
Ingula Nature Reserve	Ingula Pumped Storage Scheme 28°15′S 029°34′E			80.84	01/03/2021	
Kgaswane Mountain Reserve	25°43′S 027°12′E			49.52	29/03/2019	
Kosi Bay	Maputaland 27°01′S 032°49′E			109.82	28/06/1991	
Lake Sibaya	Maputaland 27°20′S 032°40′E			77.50	28/06/1991	
Langebaan Lagoon	Langebaan 33°09′S 018°04′E			60.00	25/04/1988	
Makuleke Wetlands	Kruger National Park 22°23′S 031°12′E	Flood plain at confluence of the Luvuvhu and Limpopo rivers that consists of riparian woodlands and floodplain grasslands. Important ecosystem for the vulnerable Mozambique tilapia, the critically endangered African longfin eel and white-backed vulture.		77.57	22/05/2007	
Middelpunt Nature Reserve	Dullstroom 25°32′S 030°07′E			5.10	15/03/2023	
Natal Drakensberg Park	uKhahlamba-Drakensberg Park 29°23′S 029°24′E			2428.13	21/01/1997	
Ndumo Game Reserve	Maputaland 26°52′S 032°15′E			101.17	21/01/1997	
Ntsikeni Nature Reserve	30°07′S 029°28′E			92.00	02/02/2010	
Nylsvley Nature Reserve	Mookgophong 24°38′S 028°41′E			39.70	07/07/1998	
Orange River Mouth	Alexander Bay 28°35′S 016°28′E			20.00	28/06/1991	
Prince Edward Islands	sub-Antarctic Indian Ocean 46°52′S 037°46′E			375.00	22/05/2007	
Seekoeivlei Nature Reserve	Memel 27°35′S 029°35′E			47.54	21/01/1997	
St. Lucia System	iSimangaliso Wetland Park 27°55′S 032°29′E			1555.00	02/10/1986	
Turtle Beaches / Coral Reefs of Tongaland	iSimangaliso Marine Protected Area 27°29′S 032°44′E			395.00	02/10/1986	
Verloren Valei Nature Reserve	Steenkampsberg, Mpumalanga 25°18′S 030°06′E			58.91	16/10/2001	
Verlorenvlei	Redelinghuys 32°20′S 018°25′E			15.00	28/06/1991	
Wilderness Lakes	Wilderness 33°59′S 022°40′E			13.00	28/06/1991	
uMgeni Vlei Nature Reserve	29°29′S 029°49′E			9.58	19/03/2013	

== See also ==
- Marine protected areas of South Africa
- List of protected areas of South Africa
