= Verkykerskop =

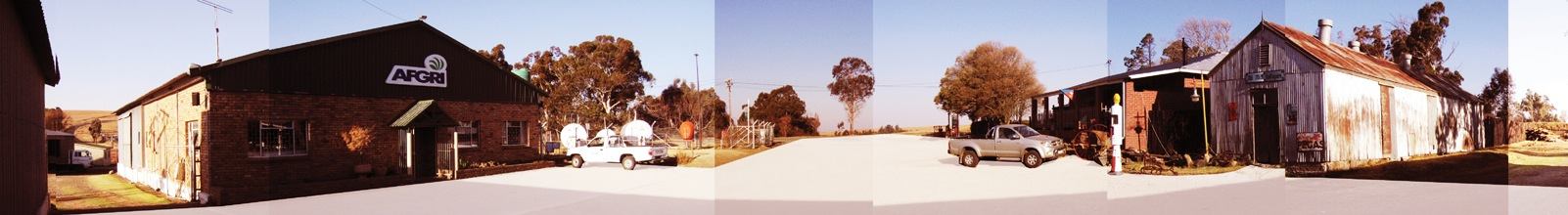
- The “uitspanning”, Verkykerskop

- Location within Free State (South African province) Location within South Africa
- Coordinates: 27.918°S 29.281°E
- Country: South Africa
- Province: Free State
- District: Thabo Mofutsanyane
- Municipality: Phumelela
- Time zone: UTC+2 (SAST)
- PO box: 9882
- Area code: 058

Verkykerskop is a town in Phumelela Local Municipality in the Free State province of South Africa, located on the R722. The town is 40 km from Harrismith, just off the N3.

Village some 35 km east-south-east of Warden and 40 km south-west of Memel. Afrikaans for 'spy hill', literally 'farlooker's hill', the name appears to have been taken over from Tafelkop, a hill 2,153 m high to the south-west of it.

Sitting on a hill on the Free State side of the border with KwaZulu-Natal, it is described as a tiny village with fewer than 20 residents in town, and a few hundred more living in surrounding villages. It is known for having one of the lowest crime levels in South Africa.
