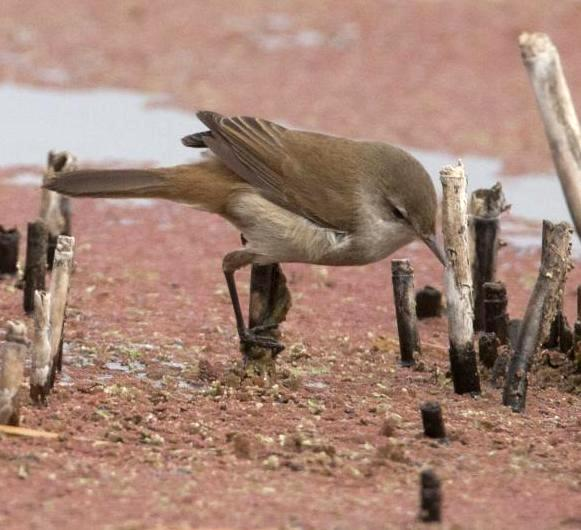
- At Marievale, Gauteng

Conservation status
- Least Concern (IUCN 3.1)

Scientific classification
- Kingdom: Animalia
- Phylum: Chordata
- Class: Aves
- Order: Passeriformes
- Family: Acrocephalidae
- Genus: Acrocephalus
- Species: A. gracilirostris

Binomial name
- Acrocephalus gracilirostris (Hartlaub, 1864)
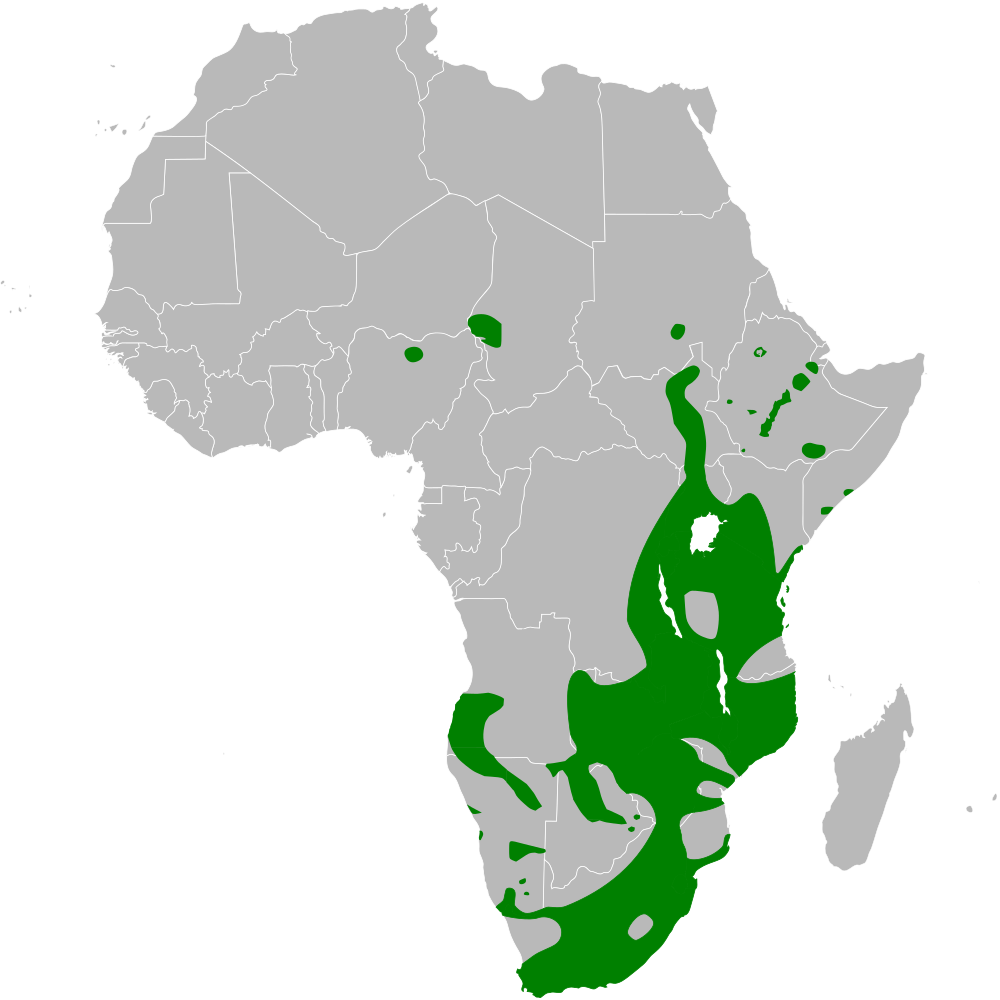

= Lesser swamp warbler =

Species of bird

The lesser swamp warbler or Cape reed warbler (Acrocephalus gracilirostris) is an Old World warbler in the genus Acrocephalus. It is sparsely present across sub-Saharan Africa, a common species of reedbeds in standing water.

== Description ==
The lesser swamp warbler is a plain-coloured smallish bird 14–16 cm long and weighing around 20 g. Its upperparts are rich brown, and it has a white supercilium. The underparts are white, with a rufous wash to the flanks. The long, strong bill has a slightly down-curved upper mandible; it is blackish-yellow with a yellower base. The legs are blue-grey and the eyes are brown. Adults of both sexes and juvenile birds are very similar in appearance.

The song is rich and melodious, a series of bubbly phrases that include trilling notes, cheerup chee trrreee and a large number of variations, with pauses between phrases.

== Behaviour ==
The lesser swamp warbler builds a deep, firm cup nest from strips of reed blades, grass and sedges, which is lined with finer grasses. It is always placed in reeds above water. It nests mainly from August to December, with the earliest nesters being those in the winter rainfall areas of the Western Cape Province. It lays two or three brown eggs. This species is monogamous, pairing for life.

The lesser swamp warbler is usually seen alone or in pairs, moving through wetland reedbeds, and clambering up and down reed stems. It eats insects and other small invertebrates.

== Conservation status ==
This common species has a large range, with an estimated extent of 5,700,000 km^{2}. The population size is believed to be large, and the species is not believed to approach the thresholds for the population decline criterion of the IUCN Red List (i.e. declining more than 30% in ten years or three generations). For these reasons, the species is evaluated as Least Concern.

== Subspecies ==
Acrocephalus gracilirostris includes the following subspecies:

- A. g. neglectus - (Alexander, 1908)
- A. g. tsanae - (Bannerman, 1937)
- A. g. jacksoni - (Neumann, 1901)
- A. g. parvus - (Fischer, GA & Reichenow, 1884)
- A. g. leptorhynchus - (Reichenow, 1879)
- A. g. winterbottomi - (White, CMN, 1947)
- A. g. cunenensis - (Hartert, 1903)
- A. g. gracilirostris - (Hartlaub, 1864)

== Gallery ==
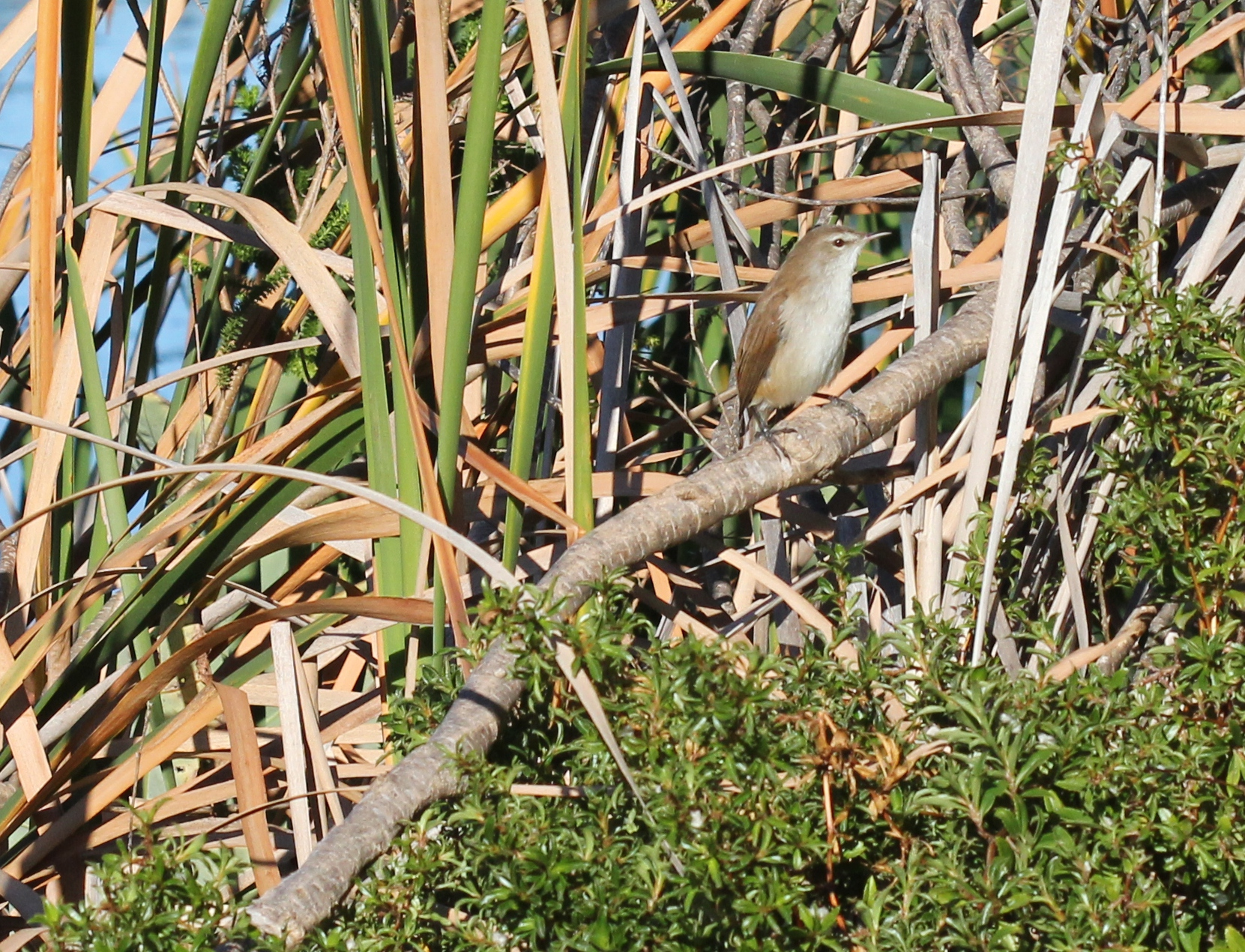
A. gracilirostris on perch in bulrush

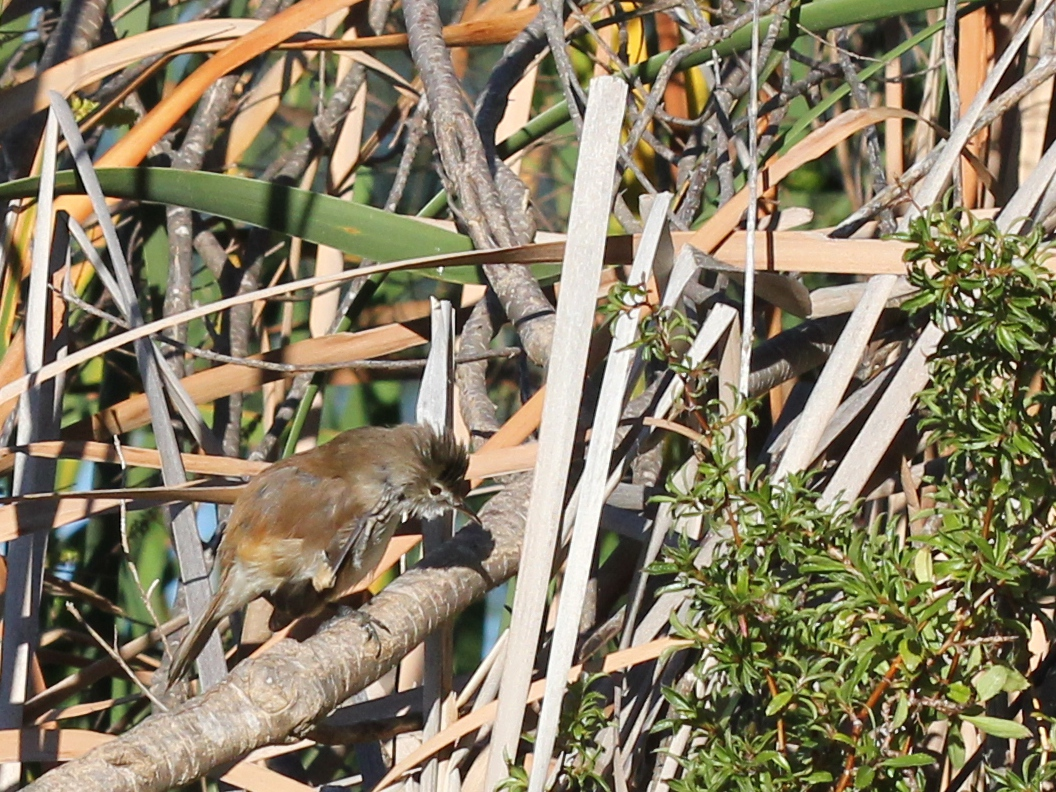
A. gracilirostris scratching itself while preening
