= R722 (South Africa) =

Regional route in South Africa

Regional route R722

Route information
- Length: 85.4 km (53.1 mi)

Major junctions
- South end: N3 at Harrismith
- North end: R34 at Memel

Location
- Country: South Africa

Highway system
- Numbered routes of South Africa
← R721	→ R723

The R722 is a Regional Route in Free State, South Africa that connects Memel with Harrismith.

== Route ==
Its north-eastern terminus is Memel at an intersection with the R34. It heads south-west to the town of Harrismith, its route ending at the N3. The road passes the small village of Verkykerskop.
