= Zamani (township) =

- Location within Free State (South African province) Location within South Africa
- Coordinates: 27°40′6″S 29°33′26″E
- Country: South Africa
- Province: Free State
- District: Thabo Mofutsanyana
- Municipality: Phumelela

Area
  - Total: 2.93 km^{2} (1.13 sq mi)

Population (2011)
  - Total: 6,523
  - Density: 2,230/km^{2} (5,770/sq mi)

Racial makeup (2011)
  - Black African: 99.56%
  - Other: 0.44%

First languages (2011)
  - Zulu: 63.55%
  - Sotho: 29.94%
  - Other: 6.51%
- Time zone: UTC+2 (SAST)
- Postal code (street): 2970
- PO box: 2970
- Area code: 058

Zamani is a township near Memel in the Thabo Mofutsanyana District Municipality in Free State province of South Africa.
