= Phumelela Local Municipality =

Coordinates: 27°25′48″S 29°09′36″E

Phumelela
- Local municipality
- Seal

- Location in the Free State
- Country: South Africa
- Province: Free State
- District: Thabo Mofutsanyane
- Seat: Vrede
- Wards: 8

Government
  - Type: Municipal council
  - Mayor: Tlokotsi John Motaung

Area
  - Total: 8,183 km^{2} (3,159 sq mi)

Population (2022)
  - Total: 52,224
  - Density: 6.382/km^{2} (16.53/sq mi)

Racial makeup (2022)
  - Black African: 91.2%
  - Coloured: 0.2%
  - Indian/Asian: 0.7%
  - White: 7.8%

First languages (2011)
  - Zulu: 56.0%
  - Sotho: 32.4%
  - Afrikaans: 7.5%
  - English: 1.2%
  - Other: 2.9%
- Time zone: UTC+2 (SAST)
- Municipal code: FS195

Phumelela Municipality (Zulu: UMasipala wase Phumelela; Sotho: Masepala wa Phumelela) is a local municipality within the Thabo Mofutsanyane District Municipality, in the Free State province of South Africa. Phumelela means "to succeed" in isiZulu.

== Main places ==
The 2001 census divided the municipality into the following main places:

Place	Code	Area (km^{2})	Population	Most spoken language
Memel	41601	6.56	469	Afrikaans
Thembalihle	41603	2.33	15,952	Zulu
Vrede	41604	54.69	1,482	Afrikaans
Warden	41605	11.84	1,063	Afrikaans
Zamani	41606	4.28	5,008	Zulu
Zenzeleni	41607	5.15	5,720	Zulu
Remainder of the municipality	41602	7,463.21	21,209	Zulu

== Politics ==
The municipal council consists of sixteen members elected by mixed-member proportional representation. Eight councillors are elected by first-past-the-post voting in eight wards, while the remaining eight are chosen from party lists so that the total number of party representatives is proportional to the number of votes received.

The African National Congress (ANC) lost its majority in the 2026 election, but remained the largest party, with eight seats.

The following table shows the results of the election.

Party	Ward			List			Total seats
Party	Votes	%	Seats	Votes	%	Seats	Total seats
African National Congress	5,513	43.91	8	5,652	45.41	0	8
Democratic Alliance	2,395	19.08	0	2,505	20.13	3	3
Freedom Front Plus	1,535	12.23	0	1,653	13.28	2	2
Service Delivery Party	686	5.46	0	856	6.88	1	1
Economic Freedom Fighters	705	5.62	0	830	6.67	1	1
African Transformation Movement	264	2.10	0	353	2.84	1	1
8 other parties	1,456	11.60	0	598	4.80	0	0
Total	12,554	100.00	8	12,447	100.00	8	16
Valid votes	12,554	96.74		12,447	95.92		
Invalid/blank votes	423	3.26		530	4.08		
Total votes	12,977	100.00		12,977	100.00		
Registered voters/turnout	25,999	49.91		25,999	49.91		
