= Zaman Mahalleh =

Village in Gilan, Iran

Zaman Mahalleh زمان محله
- Village
- Location within Iran
- Coordinates: 37°44′05″N 48°58′56″E
- Country: Iran
- Province: Gilan
- County: Talesh
- Bakhsh: Asalem
- Rural District: Asalem

Population (2006)
  - Total: 117
- Time zone: UTC+3:30 (IRST)
  - Summer (DST): UTC+4:30 (IRDT)

Zaman Mahalleh (Persian: زمان محله, also Romanized as Zamān Maḩalleh; also known as Zamānī Maḩalleh) is a village in Asalem Rural District, Asalem District, Talesh County, Gilan Province, Iran. At the 2006 census, its population was 117, in 28 families.
