= Seekoeivlei Nature Reserve =

Wetland reserve in the Free State, South Africa

- Location: Free State
- Nearest town: Memel, South Africa
- Coordinates: 27°37′36.01″S 29°34′58.01″E
- Area: 49.89 square kilometres (19.26 sq mi)
- Designated: 10 February 1978; 48 years ago

Ramsar Wetland
- Official name: Seekoeivlei Nature Reserve
- Designated: 21 January 1997
- Reference no.: 888

Seekoeivlei Nature Reserve is an expansive wetland spanning some 30 km^{2} (or 4,754 hectares) near the town of Memel in the Free State, South Africa. The area was declared a Ramsar site in 1999. It is unique for housing more than 250 species of birds, and the town of Memel is now a popular destination for bird enthusiasts, featuring bird hides and picnic facilities. It is also home to some hippopotamus, "seekoei" being the Afrikaans translation, as well as zebra. It lies nearly 2000 m above sea level near the Drakensberg escarpment and close to where the Free State, Mpumalanga, and KwaZulu-Natal meet.

Two parts of the Sneeuwberg Protected Environment connects with its south-western border.

== Wetland ==
Just north of Memel, the Pampoenspruit meets the Klip River, a tributary of the Tugela River, in a 25-km^{2} swamp with consisting of a myriad of marshes, pools, floodplains, lakes, and grasslands that often flood during the rainy season. It is the largest inland wetland in the Highveld.

== Flora and fauna ==
Many rare and endangered birds can be found there. The following birds are especially common there:

- Little bittern
- Yellow-billed stork
- White-winged flufftail
- Blue crane
- Hedgehog
- Heron
- Stork
- Ibis
- Cattle egret
- Southern masked weaver
- Common quail
- Whiskered tern
- Wattled crane
- Basra reed warbler
- Rudd's lark
- Botha's lark

Probably due to the cold temperatures at this altitude, snakes are not found here.
