= Zamani, Iran =

Zamani زماني
- Village
- Location within Iran
- Coordinates: 33°25′09″N 59°14′59″E
- Country: Iran
- Province: South Khorasan
- County: Qaen
- Bakhsh: Sedeh
- Rural District: Sedeh

Population (2006)
  - Total: 122
- Time zone: UTC+3:30 (IRST)
  - Summer (DST): UTC+4:30 (IRDT)

Zamani (Persian: زماني, also Romanized as Zamānī; also known as Zamīni) is a village in Sedeh Rural District, Sedeh District, Qaen County, South Khorasan Province, Iran. At the 2006 census, its population was 122, in 52 families.
