= Zahmani =

Zahmani زحماني
- Village
- Location within Iran
- Coordinates: 34°37′53″N 47°26′04″E
- Country: Iran
- Province: Kermanshah
- County: Sahneh
- Bakhsh: Dinavar
- Rural District: Horr

Population (2006)
  - Total: 220
- Time zone: UTC+3:30 (IRST)
  - Summer (DST): UTC+4:30 (IRDT)

Zahmani (Persian: زحماني, also Romanized as Zaḩmānī; also known as Zamāni) is a village in Horr Rural District, Dinavar District, Sahneh County, Kermanshah Province, Iran. At the 2006 census, its population was 220, in 45 families.
