= Blesbokspruit =

River in South Africa

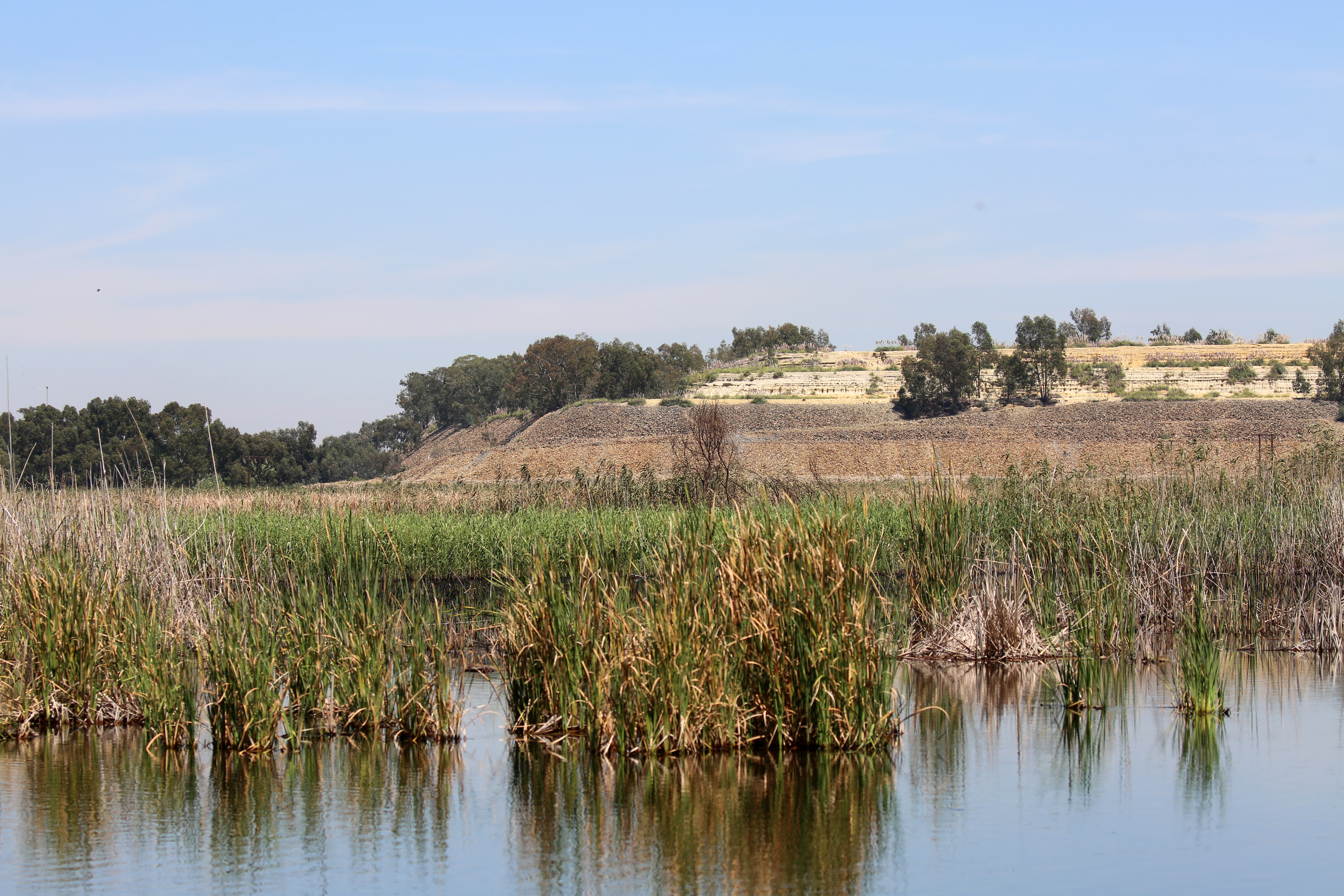

Location
- Country: South Africa
- Province: Gauteng

Physical characteristics
- Mouth: Suikerbosrand River
  - coordinates: 26°36′00″S 28°17′23″E

Basin features
- Protection status

Ramsar Wetland
- Official name: Blesbokspruit
- Designated: 2 October 1986
- Reference no.: 343

The Blesbokspruit is a river in Gauteng, South Africa that originates north of Daveyton, from where it runs south and then west past the towns of Springs, Nigel and Heidelberg before joining the Suikerbosrand River, a tributary of the Vaal River.

The Marievale Bird Sanctuary is situated in its upper reaches, established when roads and pipelines reached nearby mines in 1930. An area of 1,848 hectares has been declared a Ramsar site to guard against industrial pollution of the wetland, and has been designated as an Important Bird Area.

== Biodiversity ==
Among the plants and animals that can be found in the Bleksbokspruit wetland are heron, bulrushes, phragmites reeds, yellow-billed ducks, marsh mongoose and giant bullfrogs.

== See also ==
- List of rivers of South Africa
