= Marievale Bird Sanctuary =

Bird sanctuary reserve in Gauteng, South Africa

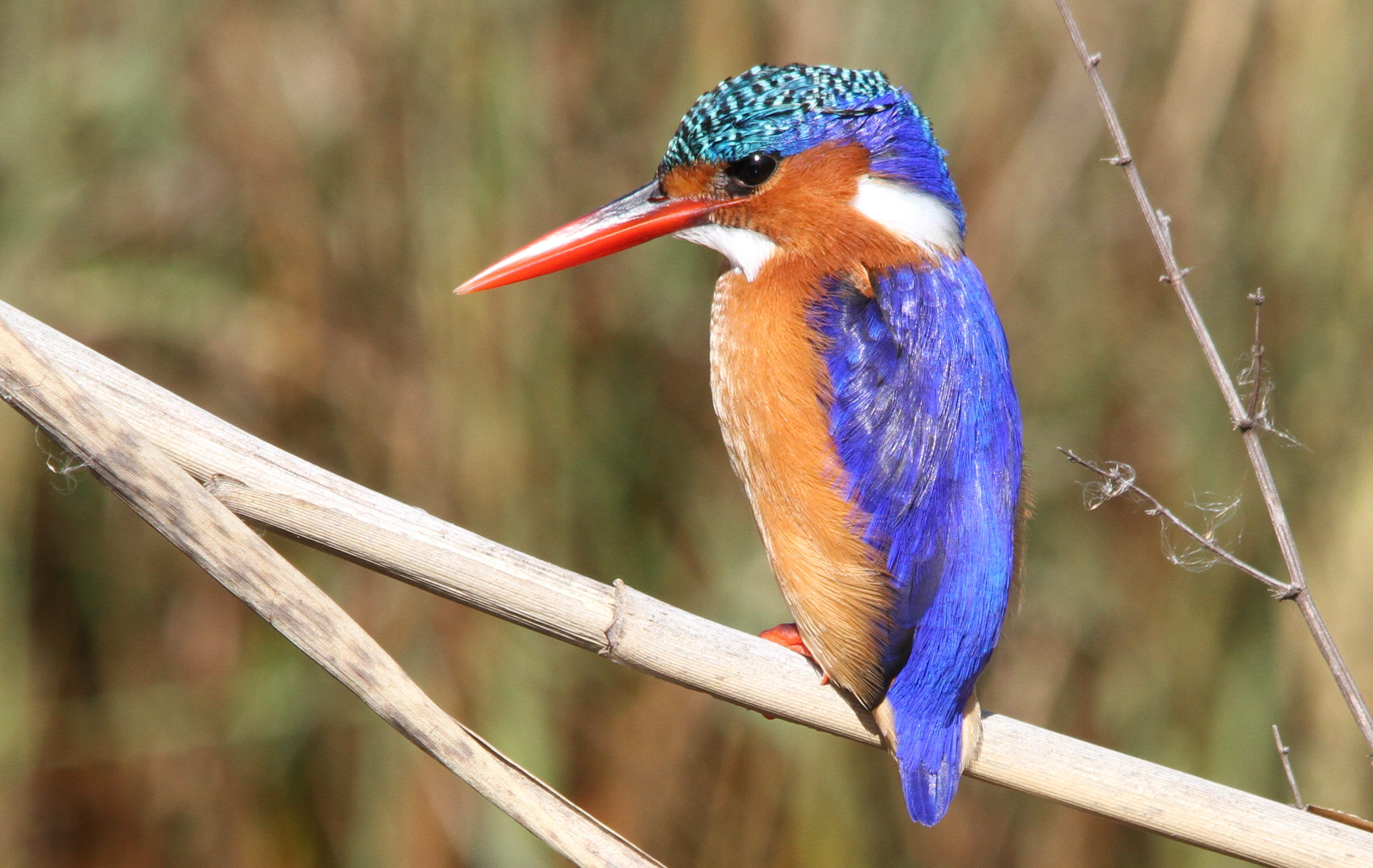
- Interactive map of Marievale Bird Sanctuary
- Location: Blesbokspruit
- Nearest city: Nigel
- Coordinates: 26°21′35″S 28°30′32″E
- Area: 1,526.01 ha (3,770.9 acres)
- Established: 26 April 1978
- Administrator: Department of Agriculture, Environment and Rural Affairs
- Camp sites: 2
- Website: Marievale Bird Sanctuary

Marievale Bird Sanctuary is a protected area in Gauteng, South Africa. It is a Ramsar site about 15 km^{2} in size, and situated on the East Rand on the southern half of the Blesbokspruit wetland. The Blesbokspruit is a major perennial river in Gauteng which is flanked by extensive floodplains on either side. Nearby is the Suikerbosrand Nature Reserve.

== History ==
In 1978, a reserve 524 ha in extent was established. This was further extended to 1,526.01 ha.

== Biodiversity ==
The Blesbokspruit wetland, in which the sanctuary is situated, is designated as an Important Bird Area. Almost 300 bird species frequent the wetland, according to the Wildlife and Environment Society of South Africa (WESSA), with the best time to visit being between spring and the start of summer.

=== Birds ===
Birds found at the wetland include:

- African grass owl
- African spoonbill
- Baird's sandpiper
- Baillon's crake
- Black heron
- Black-winged pratincole
- Black-tailed godwit
- Buff-breasted sandpiper
- Caspian tern
- Curlew sandpiper
- African snipe
- Fulvous whistling duck
- Great egret
- Goliath heron
- Marsh owl
- Pectoral sandpiper
- Purple heron
- Red-chested flufftail
- Sand martin
- Red-knobbed coot
- Reed cormorant
- South African shelduck
- Slaty egret
- Squacco heron
- Western yellow wagtail
- Yellow-billed duck

=== Mammals ===
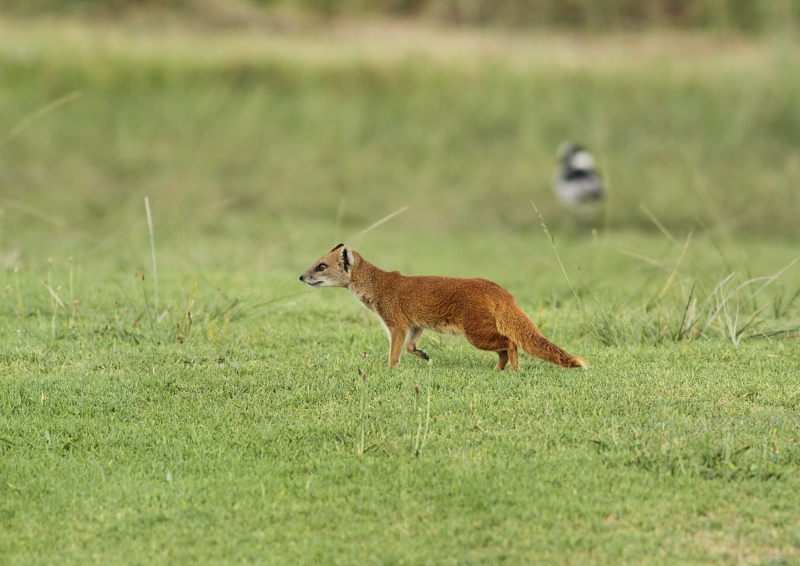
Yellow mongoose (Cynictis penicillata), a grassland carnivore, at Marievale in summer

In addition to birds, mammals have also been observed in the sanctuary:

- Blesbok
- Cape clawless otter
- Three species of mongoose
- Southern reedbuck
- Cape hare

=== Vegetation ===
Within the wetland phragmites, typha and juncus reeds can be found between the water pans. A grassland biome occurs near the eastern border.

== Activities ==
There is a conference centre and 2 chalets in the sanctuary. There are four bird hides at the water pans (named Flamingo, Hadeda, Duiker and Shelduck) and a public picnic site in the reserve.

== Threats ==
The flow of the Blesbokspruit has been hampered by the surrounding industries, i.e. gold mine tailings, sewage treatment plants, farmland expansion and urban development in some parts of the wetland, creating disjointed pans of water in the wetland. Previously the river had few reed beds and few open stretches of shallow water. With the profusion of vegetation like sedges, bulrushes, duckweed and reeds, and the dumping of several large sand embankments through urban expansion, the landscape has since changed, resulting in the reduction of suitable habitat on the river.

== Gallery ==
Selection of species from the Marievale Bird Sanctuary

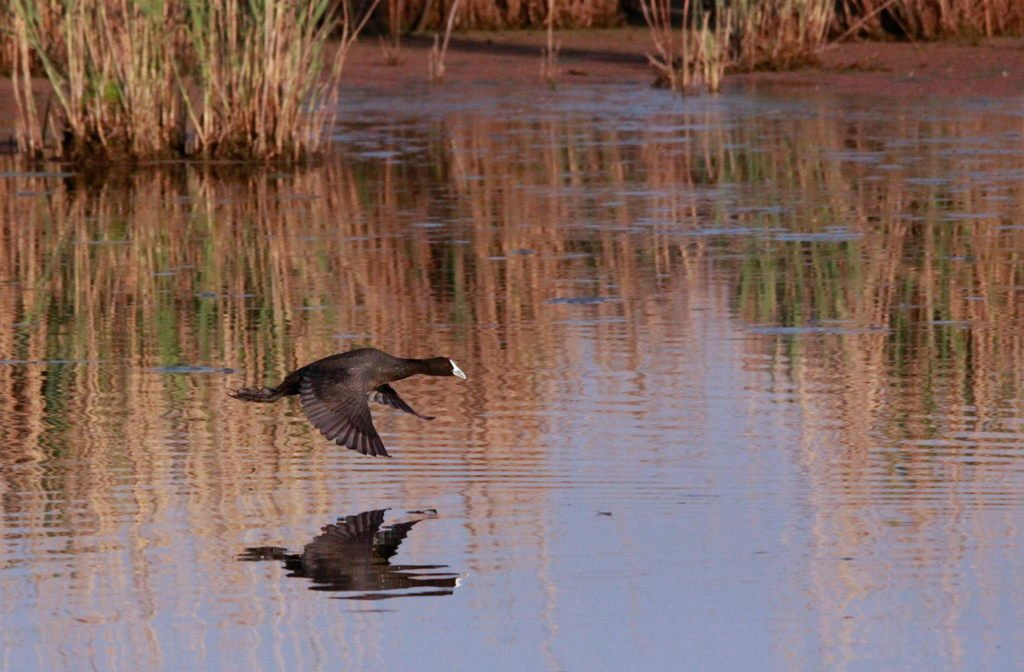
Red-knobbed coot

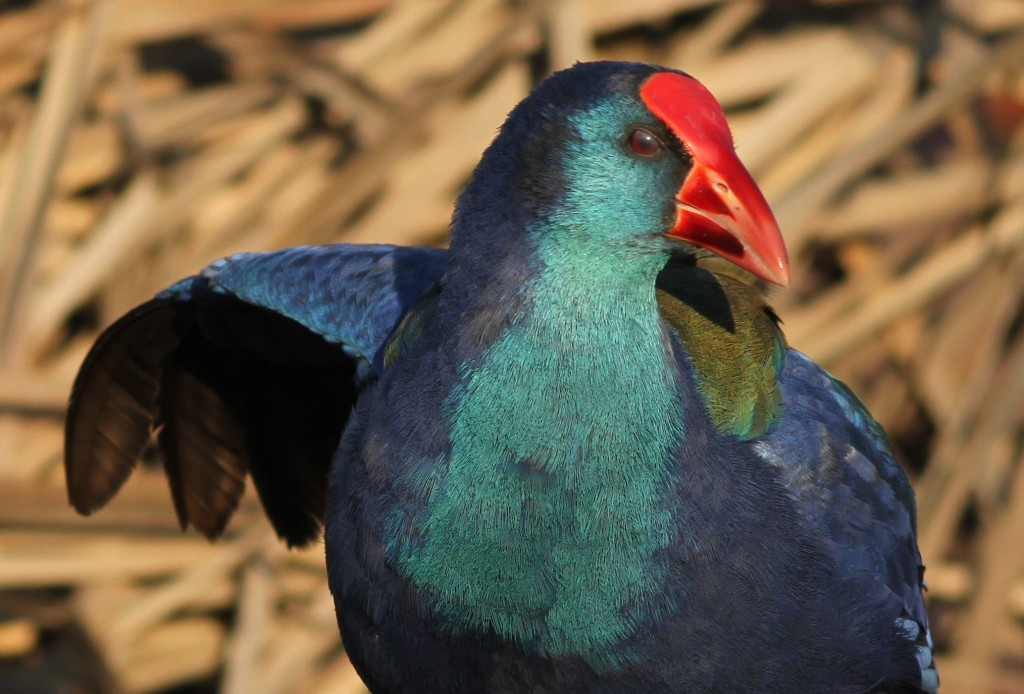
African swamphen

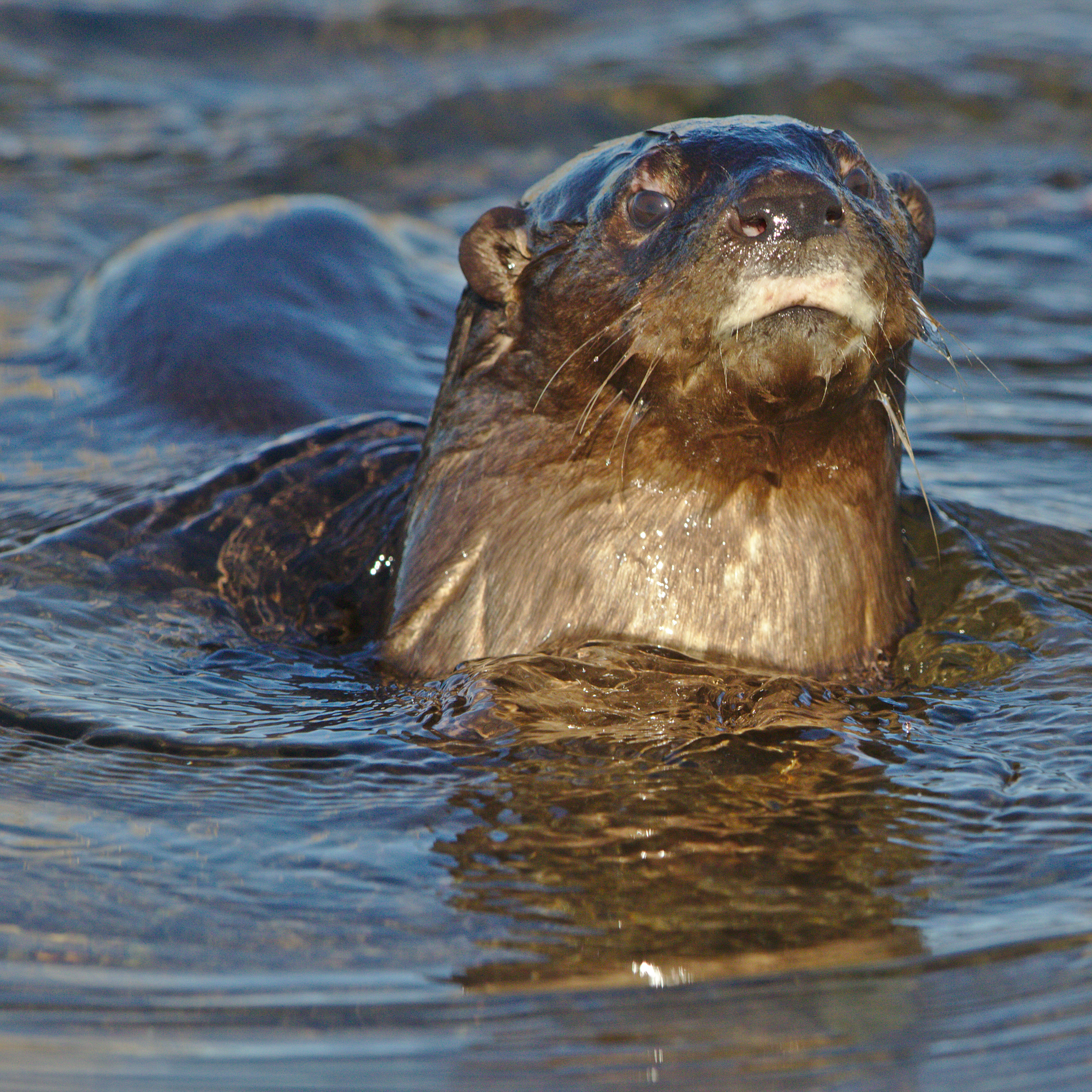
Spotted-necked otter

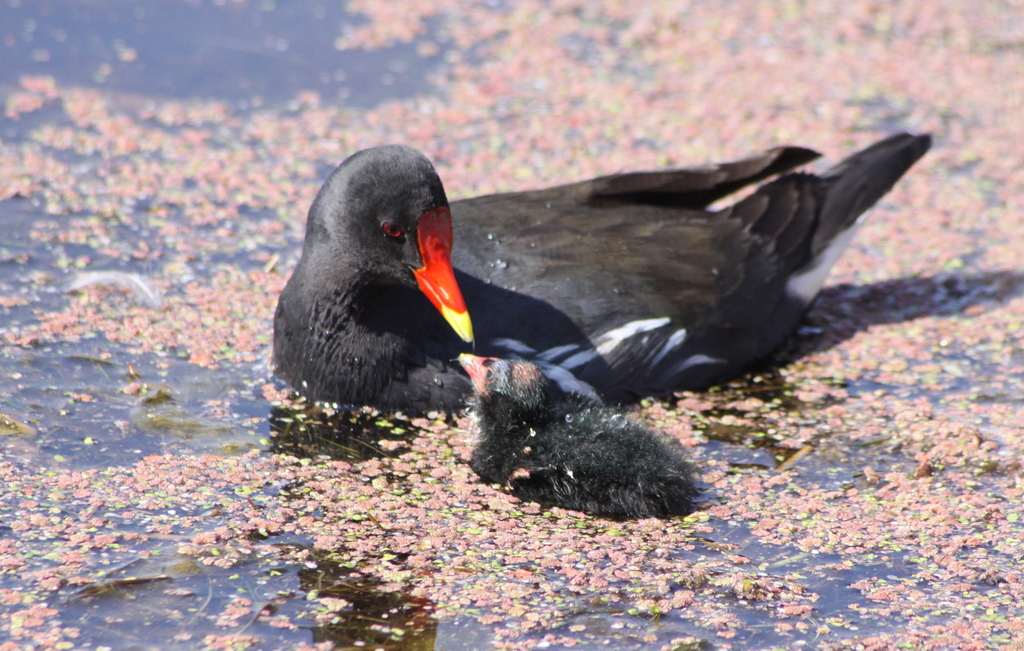
A moorhen family in the sanctuary

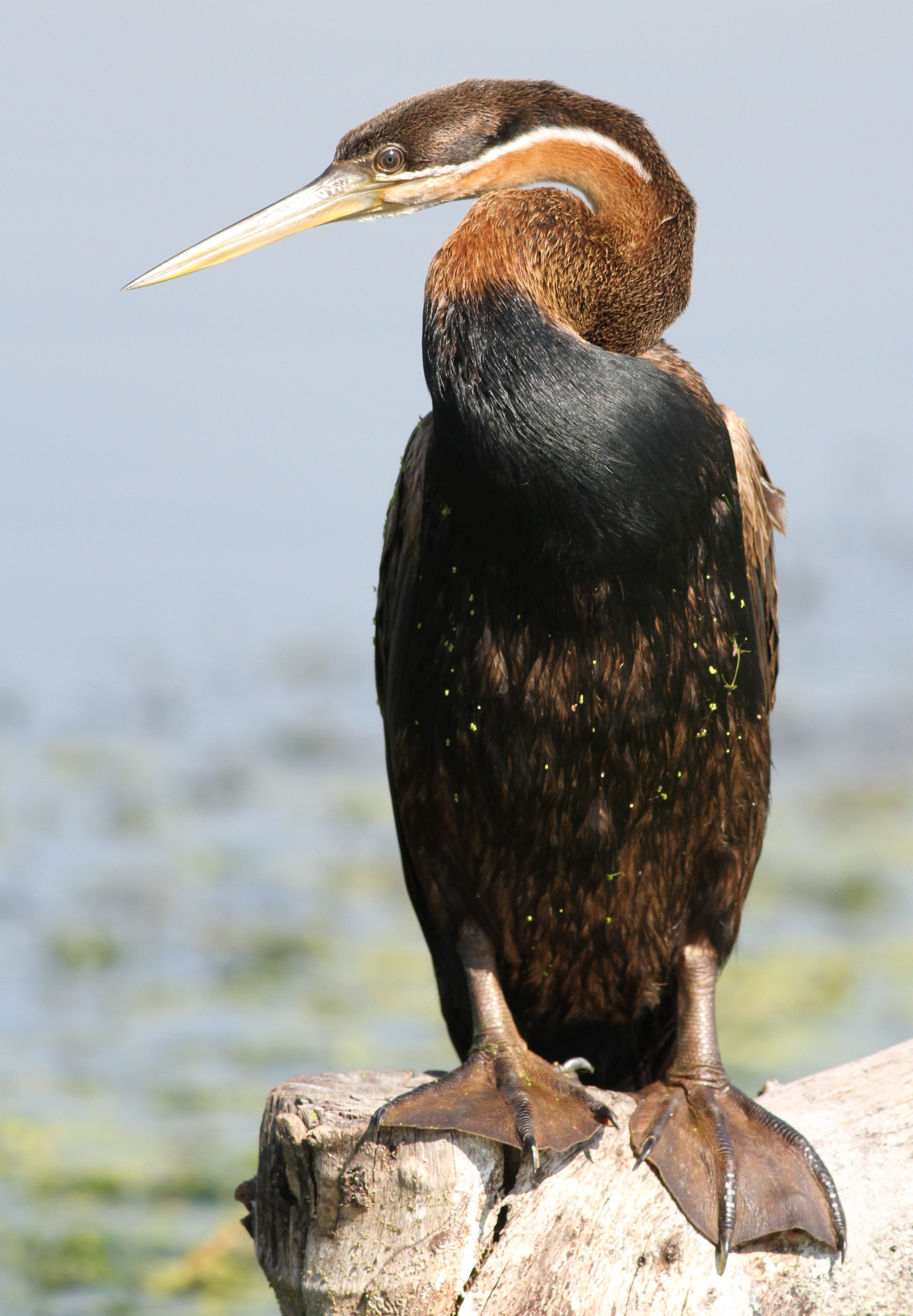
African darter

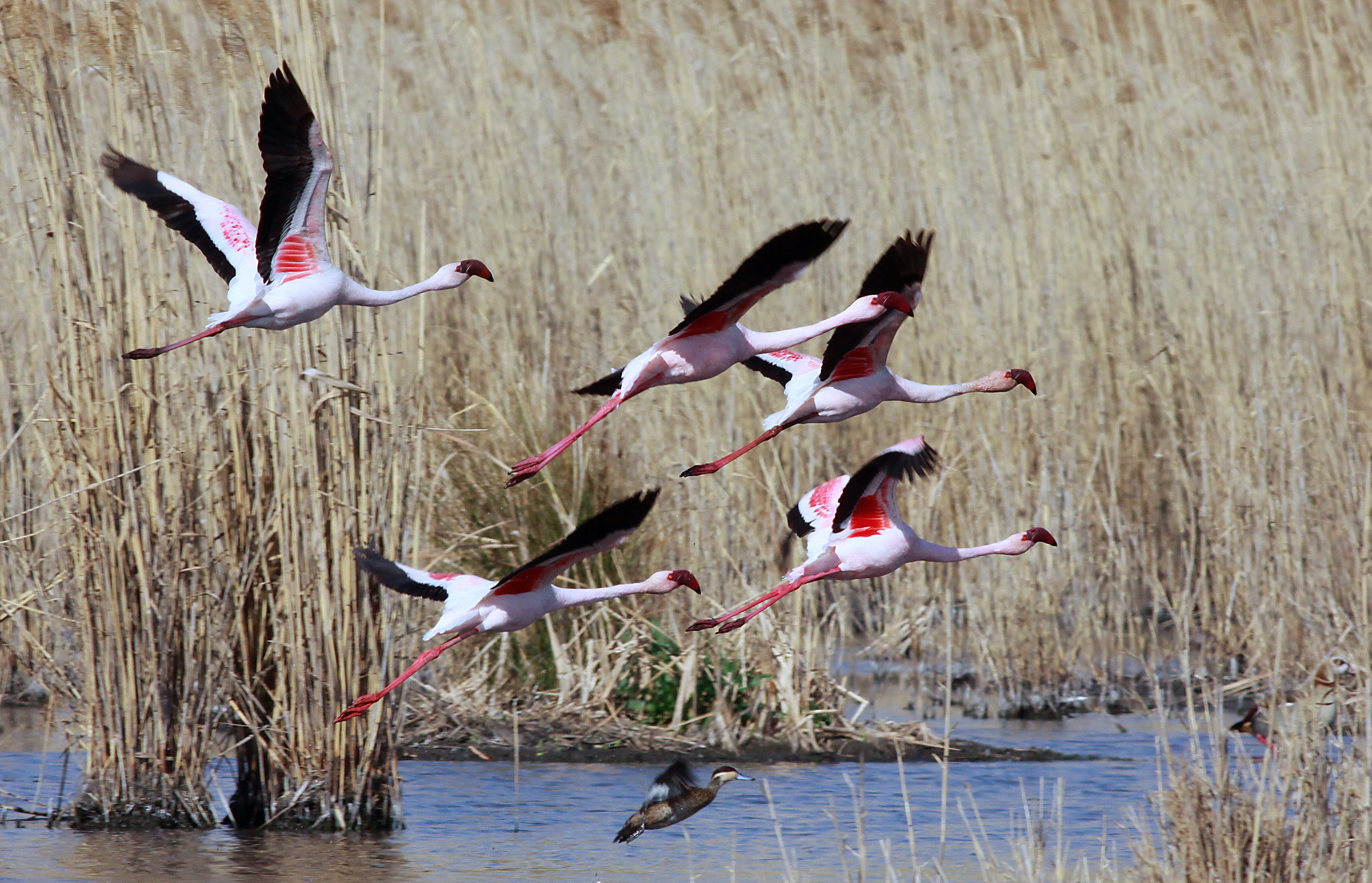
Lesser flamingo flock

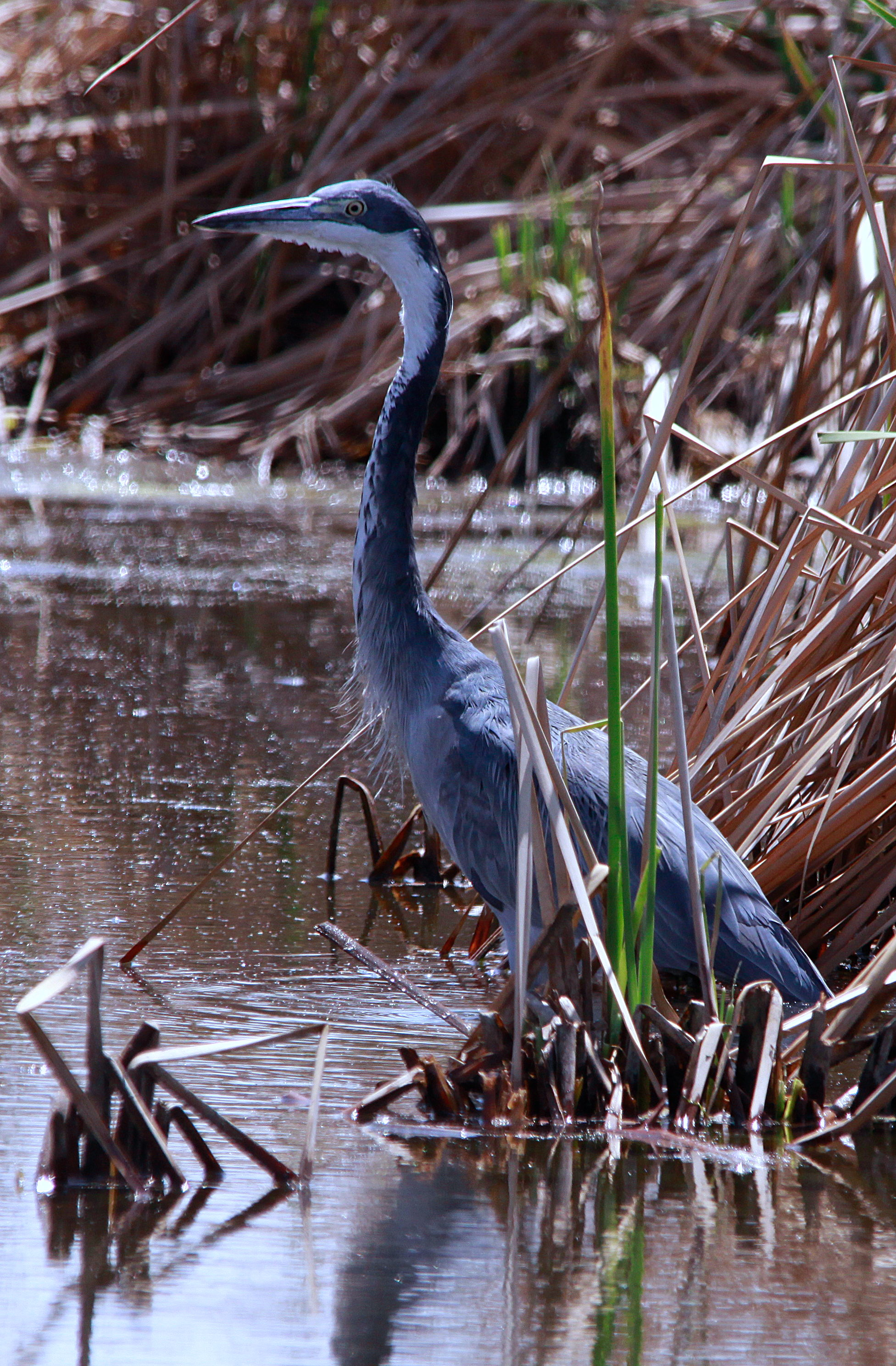
Black-headed heron

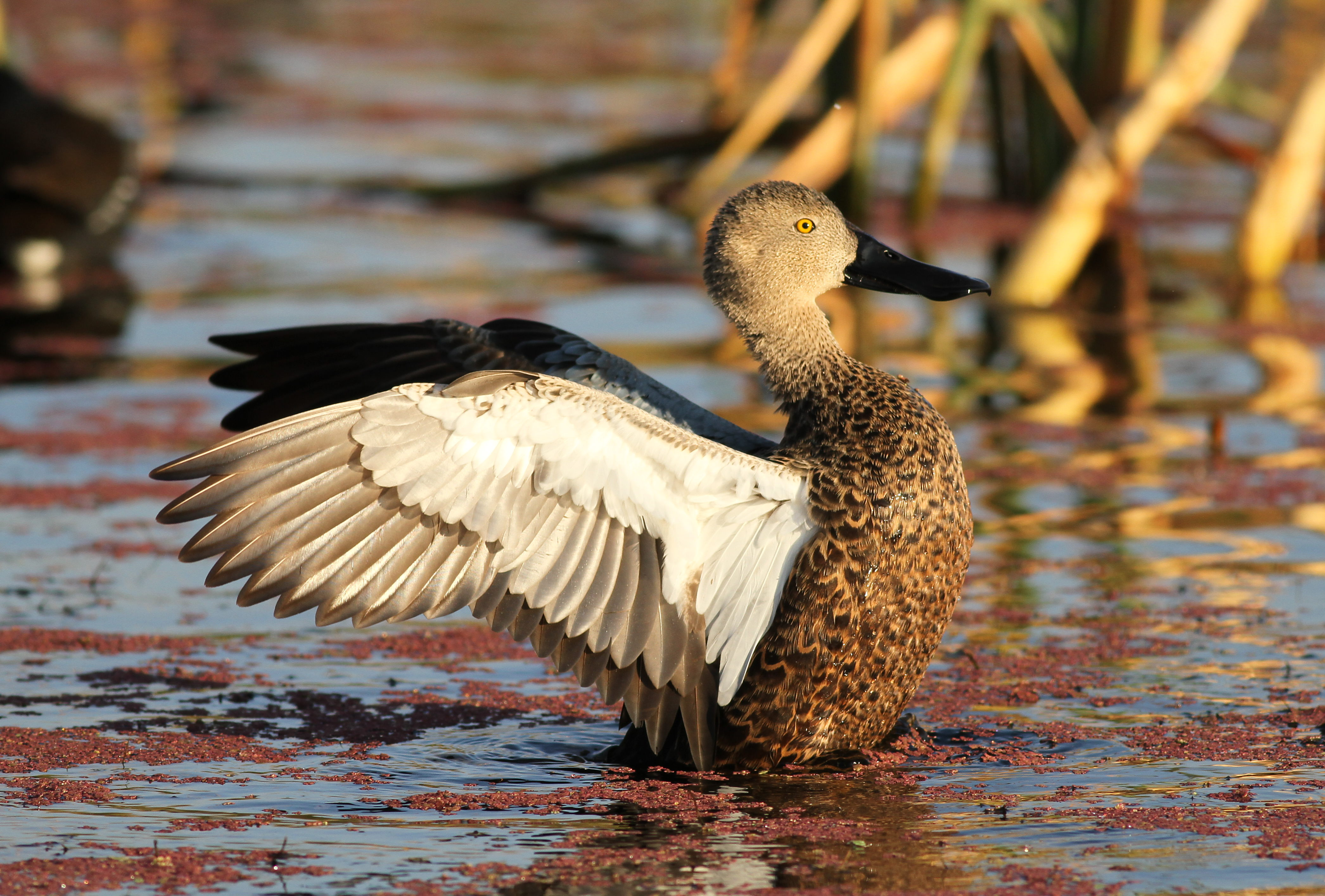
Cape shoveler

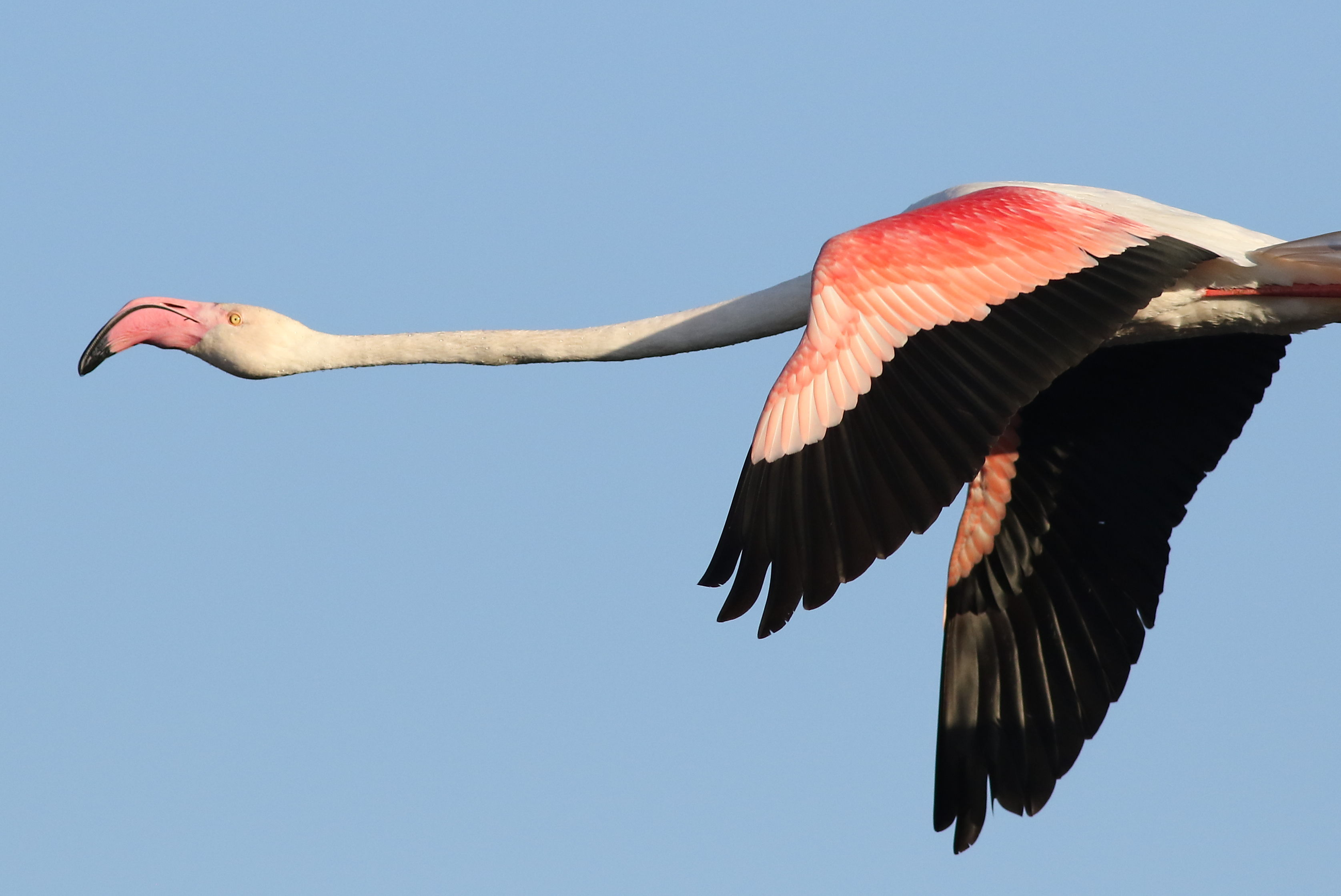
Greater flamingo

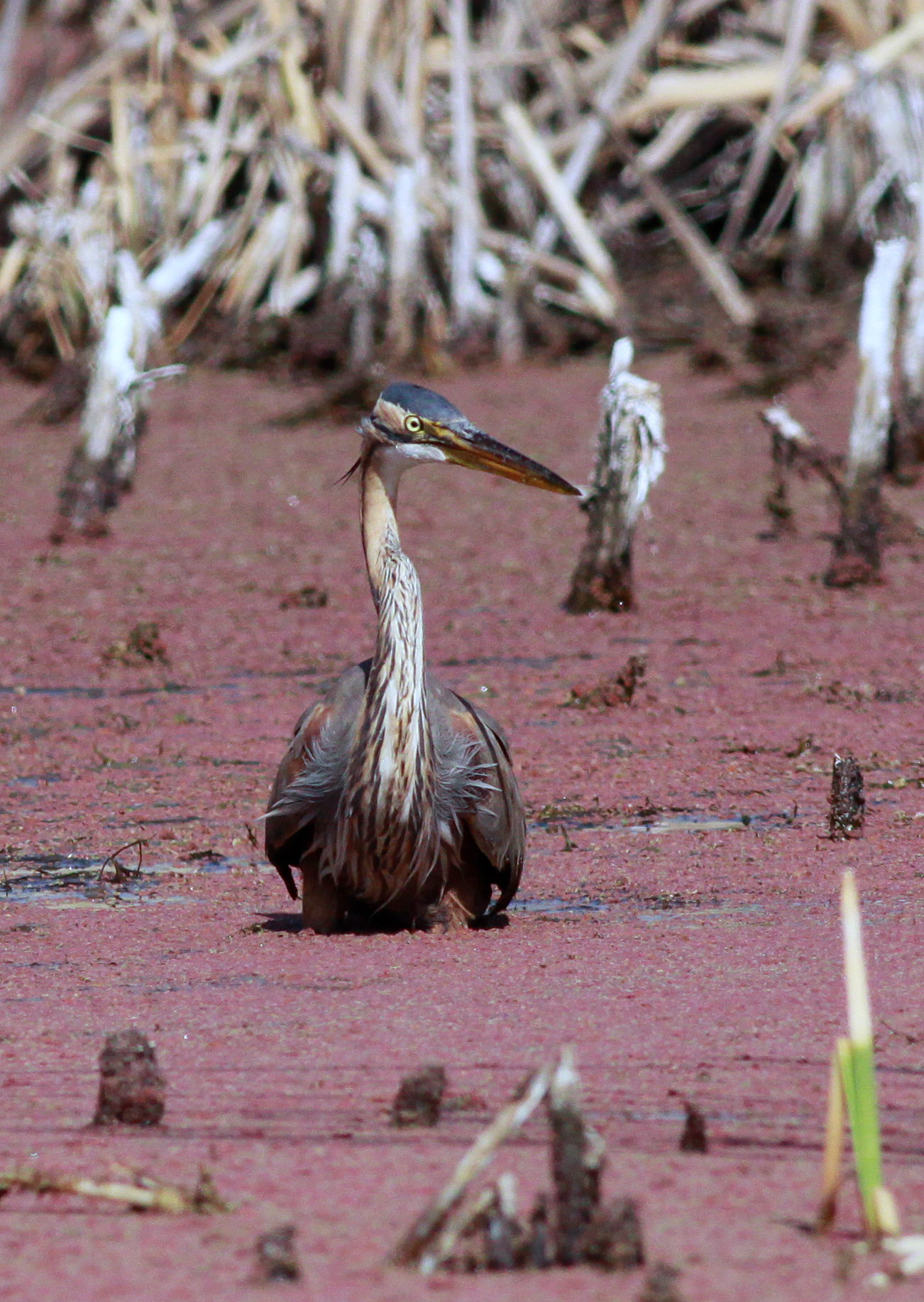
Purple heron

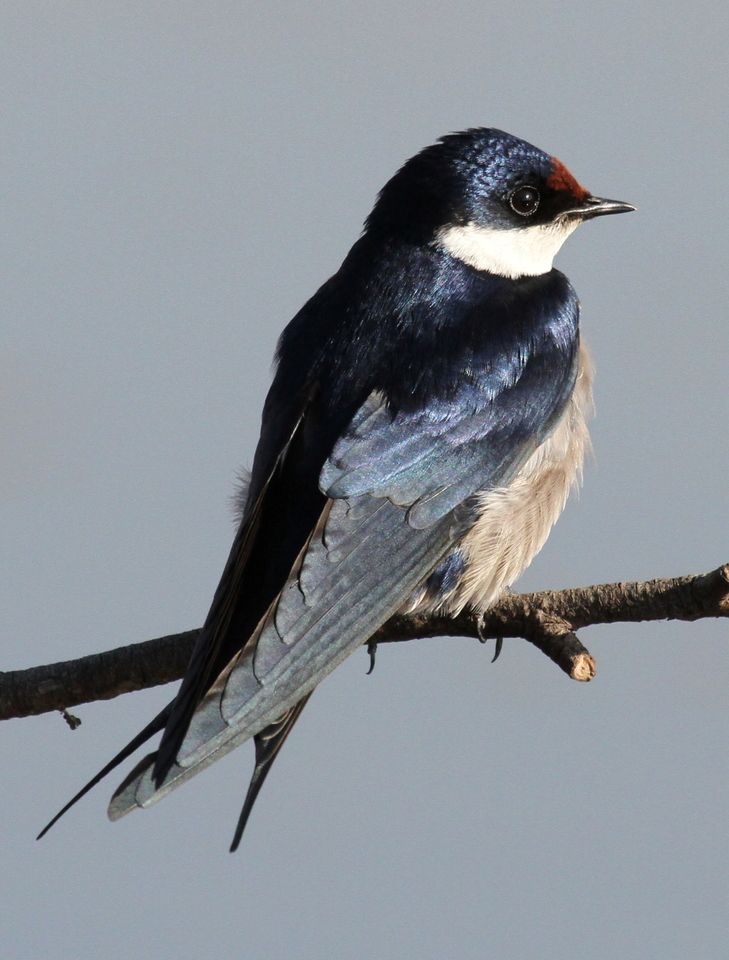
White-throated swallow

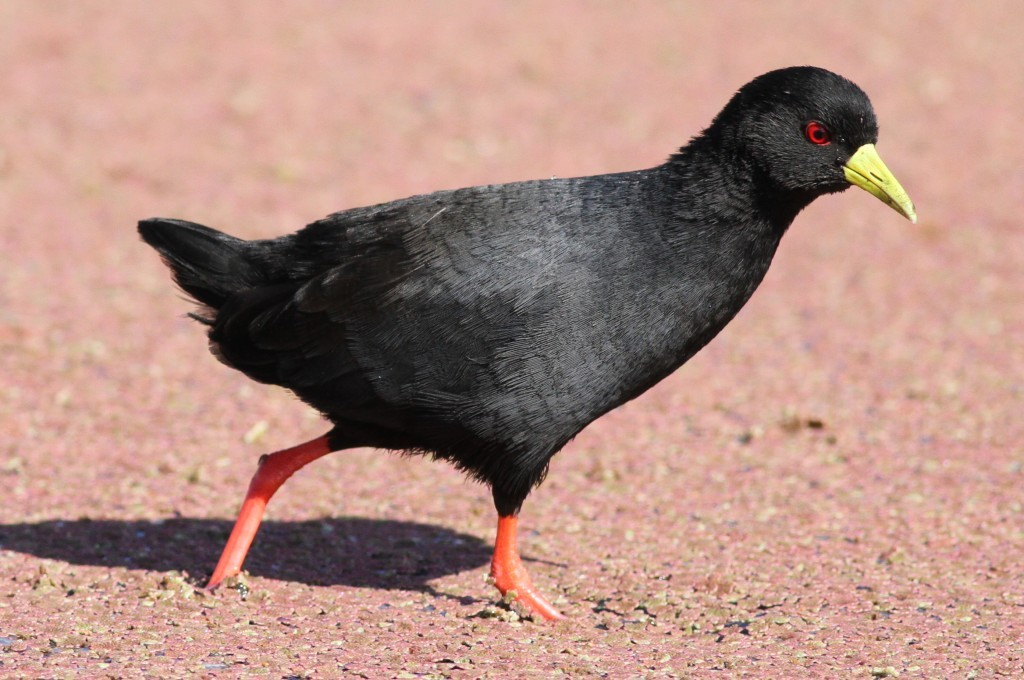
Black crake

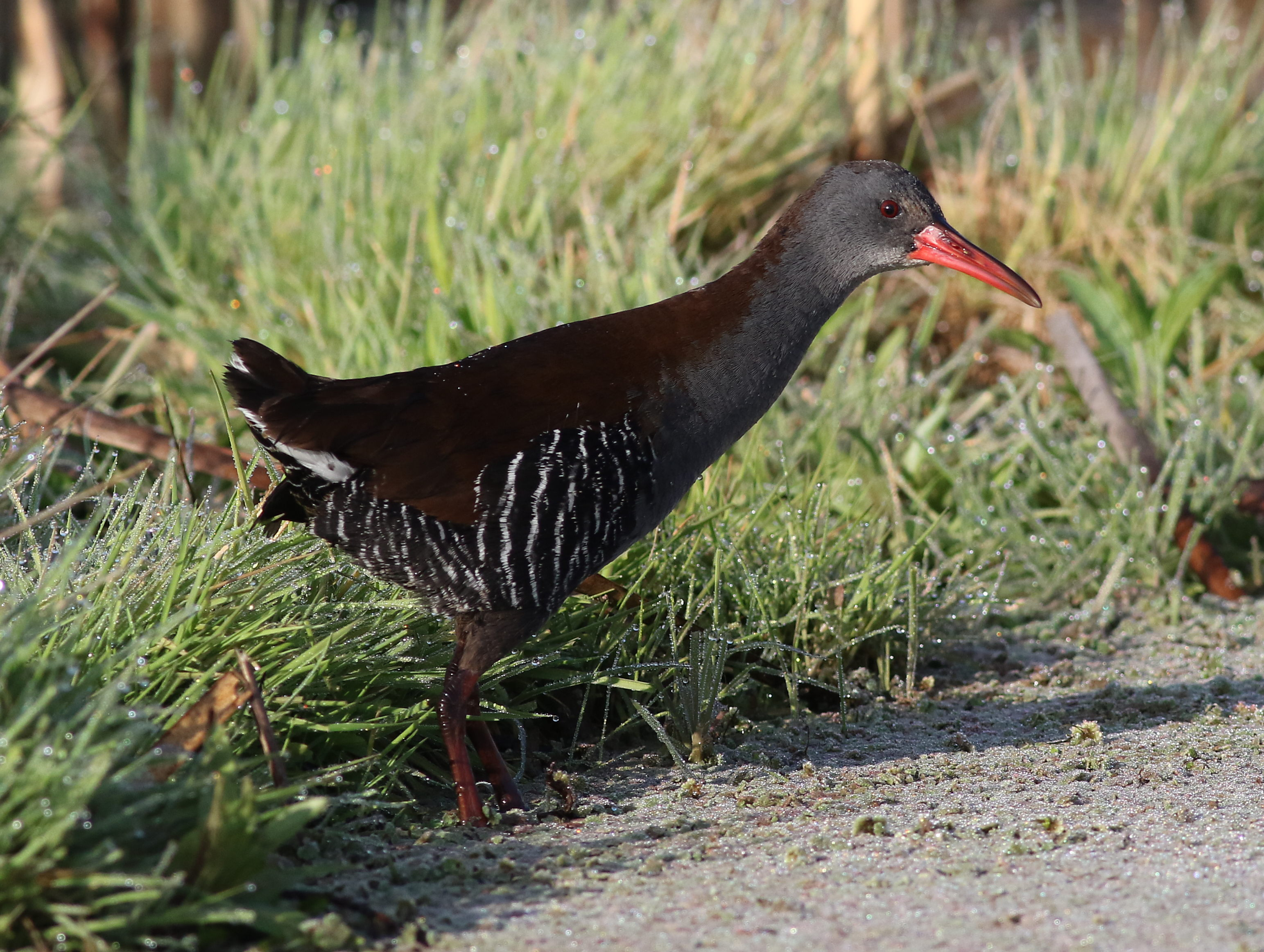
African rail

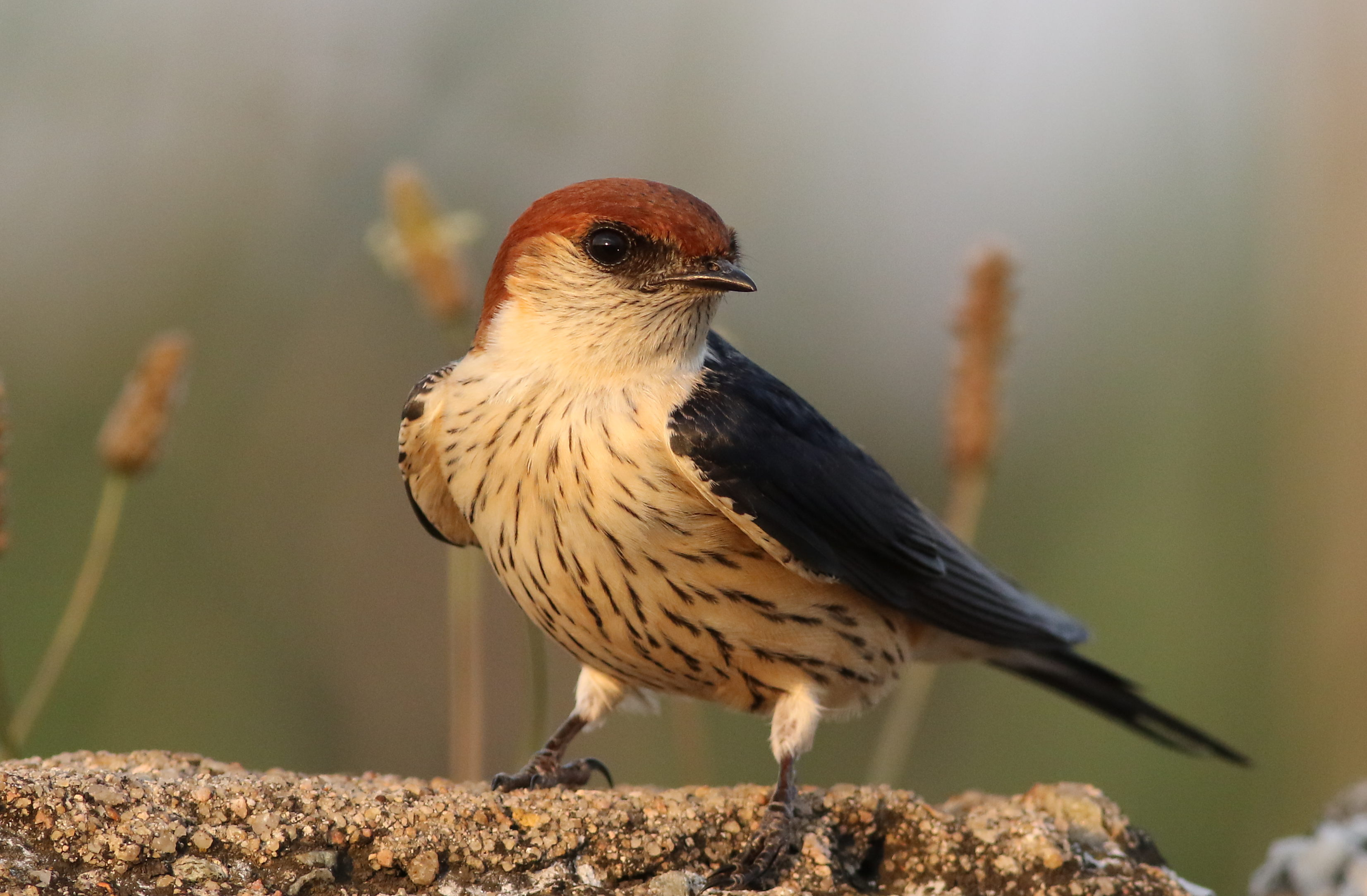
Greater striped swallow

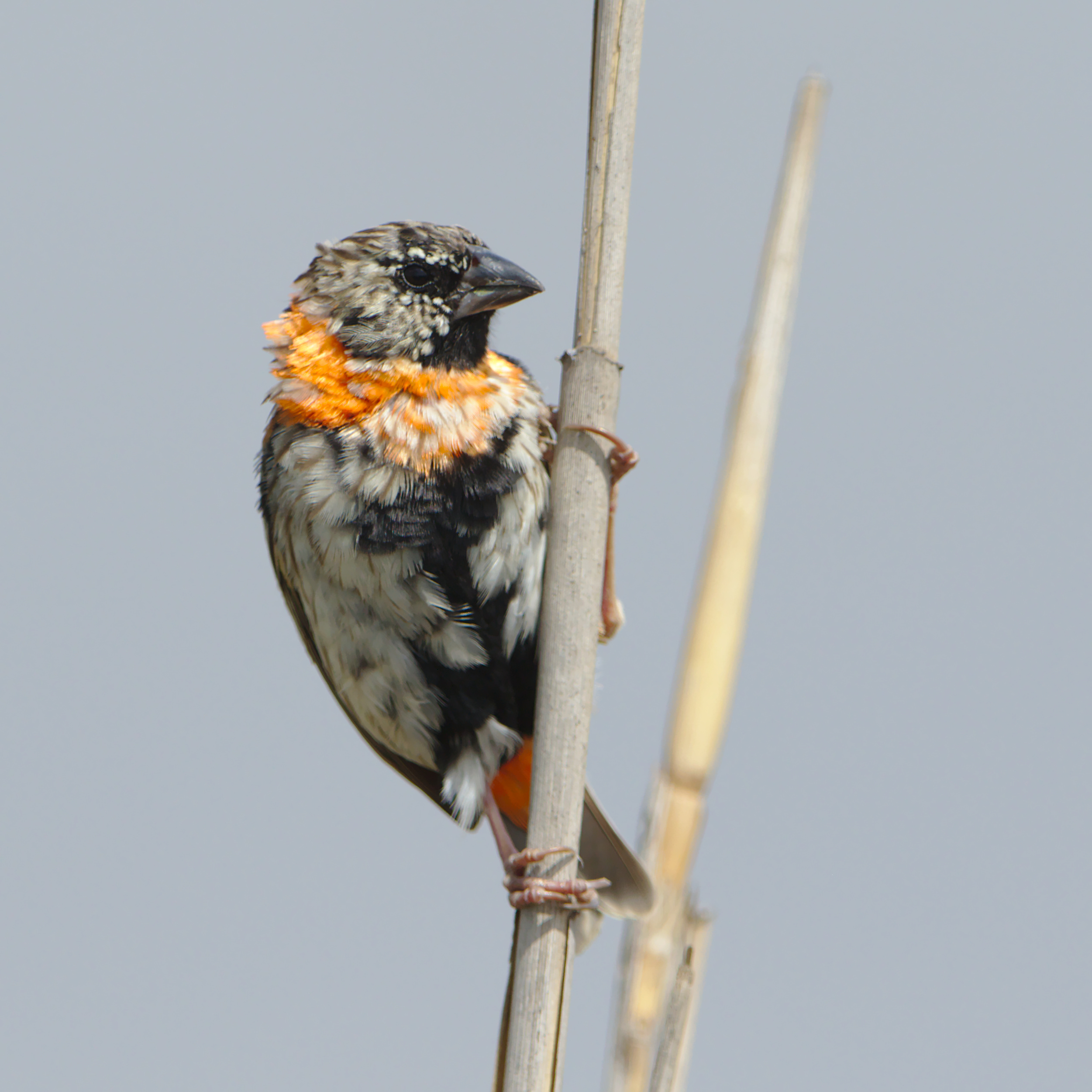
Juvenile male Southern red bishop
