= Memel, South Africa =

Memel
- Location within Free State (South African province) Location within South Africa
- Coordinates: 27°41′S 29°34′E
- Country: South Africa
- Province: Free State
- District: Thabo Mofutsanyane
- Municipality: Phumelela

Area
  - Total: 11.8 km^{2} (4.6 sq mi)
- Elevation: 1,720 m (5,640 ft)

Population (2011)
  - Total: 7,142
  - Density: 605/km^{2} (1,570/sq mi)

Racial makeup (2011)
  - Black African: 94.6%
  - White: 4.8%
  - Indian/Asian: 0.3%
  - Coloured: 0.2%
  - Other: 0.1%

First languages (2011)
  - Zulu: 63.3%
  - Sotho: 28.5%
  - Afrikaans: 3.9%
  - English: 1.1%
  - Other: 3.2%
- Time zone: UTC+2 (SAST)
- Postal code (street): 2970
- PO box: 2970
- Area code: 058

Memel is a town in the Free State province of South Africa, located close to the provincial boundaries of both KwaZulu-Natal and Mpumalanga, and is situated some 1,730 metres above sea level.

== Etymology ==
The town is perhaps named after the port city of Memel in former East Prussia by a settler with historical links to the Baltic, but there is no direct evidence of this. Today this Baltic city is called Klaipėda in Lithuania. In Lithuanian, Memel means mute, silent (mėmelis, mėmė) and this same name was adopted by speakers of German who later colonized that part of the Baltic. Whilst silence certainly remains one of the fine attributes of the surrounding rural area, it can be difficult to find within the town itself these days as the population of Memel continues to expand. There is also little evidence to support the alternate theory that Memel means surrounded by water, although that is an equally apt description.

The recent changes that swept across South Africa since the early 1990s have also brought about a change to the name of this town, Memel-Zamani now being the official name in recognition of the Zamani township - a settlement adjoining Memel to the west in which several thousand black Africans reside. During the apartheid era Zamani was separated from Memel by a golf course which acted as a buffer between the two, now however the golf course no longer exists, houses have been built on it and the buffer zone has disappeared. The town and township are now adjacent in one small location.

== Geography ==
Memel-Zamani lies in the west-facing lee of the Drakensberg escarpment, the escarpment functioning as the continental divide. Its high elevation and close proximity to the escarpment are the major reason for Memel's cold winters. Visitors are frequently surprised by just how cold winter can be in Memel. Added to this is the fact that the town sits in a depression in the land, this depression being surrounded by distant mountains. Memel-Zamani lies near to the Klip River from where the towns water supply is drawn.

== Flora and fauna ==
The flora of the area is dominated by high-altitude grasslands, with many exotic willow trees lining the river banks and numerous exotic species of tree being planted in the town. Chief among these is the exotic Chinese Stinkwood (Celtis sinensis), the winter climate being too cold to allow most indigenous trees to survive. Indigenous trees that can tolerate Memel's cold winters are the sage tree (Buddleija salvifolia), Kareeboom (Rhus lanceolata) and oldwood (ouhout in Afrikaans). Fauna (excluding farm stock) is seldom seen during the day, being largely nocturnal and including numerous species of buck as well as meerkats, aardvark, aardwolf, three species of medium-sized cats, porcupine, hare, mongooses and rarely leopard. The avifauna is plentiful and world-renowned.

== Climate ==
Memel's climate is extremely variable, mainly due to its altitude, Memel experiences cool to warm, moist summers and cold, dry winters. Frost is an almost daily occurrence between May and July with −10 °C (14 °F) sometimes being recorded. A temperature of −15 °C (5 °F) has been recorded on occasion. The weather is something of a joke amongst Memel's townsfolk, many people feel their town has been forgotten by the South African Weather Service which continually reports the town of Sutherland in the Northern Cape as being the coldest place in the country. Memel's thermometers often record lower temperatures than Sutherland. Strong prairie winds blow from the west during August and September and the first rains of summer can arrive from any direction anytime between September and December. Climatically speaking, Memel-Zamani is at its most predictable between January and April when the days are usually warm with regular thunderstorms.

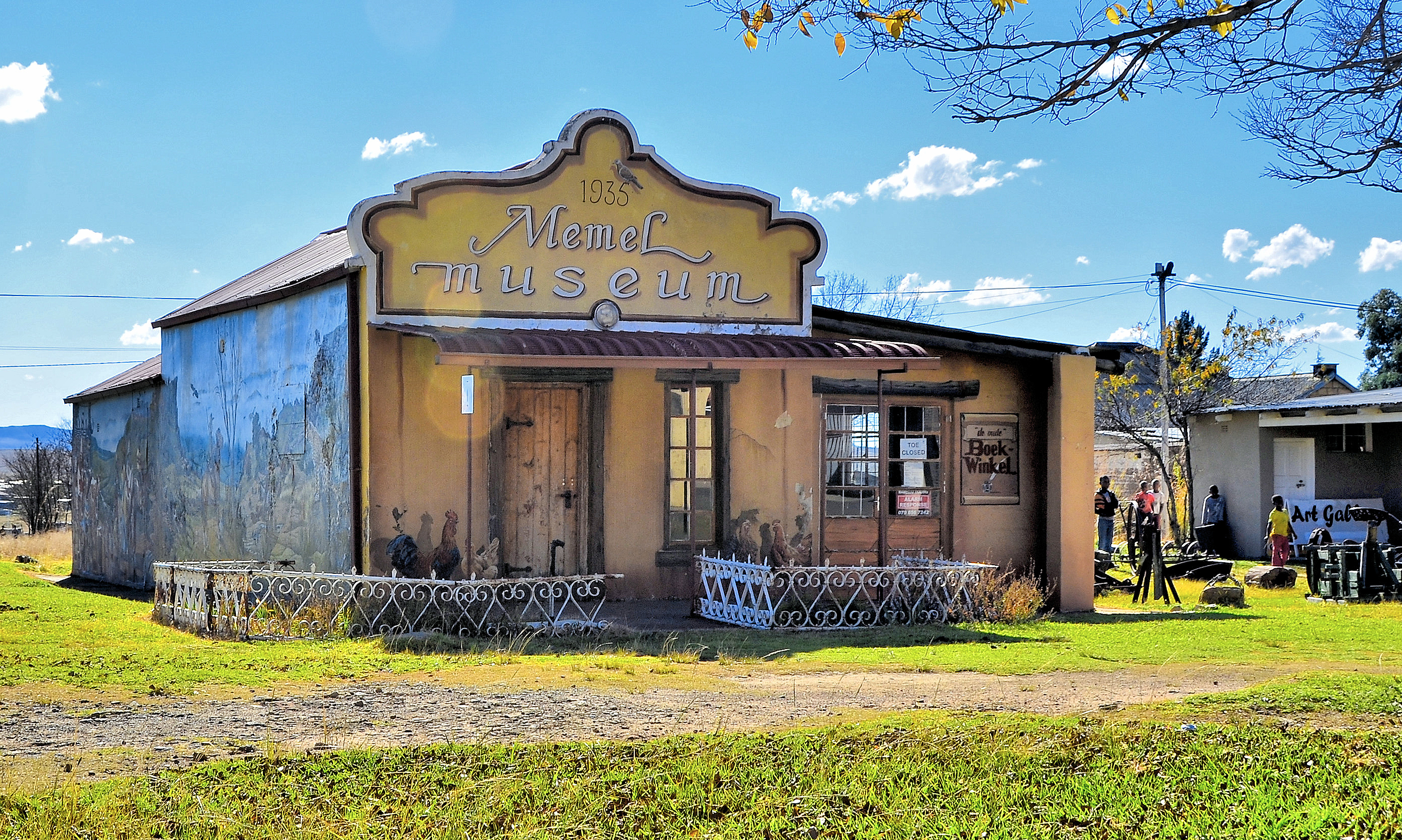
Memel Museum.jpg

== Seekoeivlei Nature Reserve ==
Seekoeivlei Nature Reserve, a massive wetland spanning some 30 km², lies to the north of the town and was declared a Ramsar site in 1999. It houses more than 250 species of birds, and the town is now a popular destination for bird enthusiasts. In the early 1990s, Birdlife South Africa identified the town of Wakkerstroom as the most important birding area in South Africa and located its field headquarters there. Some years later it became known that every bird species occurring there also occurs in Memel. Seekoeivlei is also home to some re-introduced hippopotamus, Seekoei being the Afrikaans translation for "hippo". The word "vlei" meaning wetland. Hippopotami were originally found in the wetland many years ago but were shot out and their habitat destroyed by large scale drainage for agriculture. Thus their successful re-introduction is regarded as a significant success. Tourist accommodation in the reserve was, for many years, dogged by the disappearance of funds which national government allocated for this purpose. As of 2015 however the tourist chalets have finally opened.

Early in the 20th-century farmers built numerous drainage canals to create arable farming land in the wetland. This dried the wetland out, and only in the 1990s Rand Water started a rehabilitation programme to restore the wetland. Part of their motivation was due to the realisation that clean water could be supplied more cost-effectively by forgoing chemical and mechanical treatment, and rather letting the wetland push its water back into the Vaal River where it augmented the water scheme already in place. The whole project cost over two million Rand and ongoing efforts continue to improve the situation. "Working for Wetlands" is a program supported by three separate government ministries (Water Affairs, Agriculture and Tourism). Headed in the Memel area by an engineer from Zimbabwe, Working for Wetlands annually employs between 30-90 unskilled workers who build gabions (rocks placed in wire retaining cages) and weirs to slow erosion and resurrect marshland.

== Demography ==
This part of South Africa was inhabited by the San people for thousands of years before the Bantu and European migrants arrived and it was inhabited by Bantu peoples for hundreds of years before Europeans arrived. When settlers of Dutch and British descent encountered the area in the nineteenth century, the year-round flow of the nearby Klip river and the plentiful game to be found in the area likely inspired their decision to establish a settlement there. This community gradually grew until the town of Memel was officially proclaimed in 1914. The character of Memel was, for most of its written history, that of a typical, isolated, agricultural community where apartheid and the Dutch Reformed Church were a dominant feature in peoples lives. While these are still evident today, the town has undergone a slow but sure metamorphosis since the birth of democracy in 1994.

Within the last fifteen years Zamani has expanded rapidly. This expansion, initially in the form of hundreds of shacks, is the result of people no longer being satisfied with the government's slow pace of the promised expansion beyond the original, apartheid boundaries of the township, and so, taking matters into their own hands, they gradually built new, small homes for themselves in the surrounding fields. Their direct action was successful, with the government surveying the area and officially proclaiming, at very low cost, plots on which people could build their homes. A minority of these shacks have been privately replaced by brick and concrete block construction.

Concerned philanthropists have built a model community (slated for completion early in 2015), based on some of Memel's eco-friendly developments, to show a way forward that can replace the remaining shacks.

Since 1994 dozens of people from outside, some from overseas, have moved to Memel, with many of them seeking a healthier lifestyle than that offered by the cities and lands from where they came.. As of 2019 this influx has slowed considerably.

The Zimbabwean diaspora has also had a significant impact on the town of Memel, with a large number of their people settling here. Bangladeshis, Pakistanis and Chinese have also recently settled here, many of them being shop-keepers.

In the census of 2001, the population of Memel consisted of 469 people living in 182 households. 76% of the people described themselves as "White" and 24% as "Black African". 75% spoke Afrikaans as their first language and 19% spoke Zulu. These figures are for the old town of Memel, which is populated mainly by inhabitants identifying as white. When including Zamani, the proportion of black South Africans, specifically those of the Zulus and Sotho people, form the majority in Memel-Zamani.

Memel / Zamani is populated by considerable numbers of free roaming cattle, impacting the town's gardens, streets, roadside verges, empty plots and even the athletics track. Having become accustomed to their presence, the town has simply turned to fencing to keep these newcomers out of gardens and properties.

== Health Issues ==
Diabetes, hypertension, cancer, malnutrition caused by poor diets of processed food, respiratory infections and aids further exacerbate the hardships that people live with.

== Current Issues ==
Poverty, lack of skills and lack of education continue to pose serious problems in Memel-Zamani. The Phumelela Municipality which provides basic municipal services in the area is greatly affected by this and thus it struggles to provide quality, basic services. Some manifestations of this are; the towns water supply frequently dries up, muddy water sometimes pumped into the towns water treatment facility and flowing out through taps in peoples houses, roads crumbling away, long grass growing in the streets, culverts being smashed by road-graders, water meters being misread, accounting errors and poor communication with the community.

In 2017 / 2018 a new primary school and a new library opened in Memel / Zamani, the library being equipped with covered parking, air conditioning, toilets, a play area for young children, numerous reading rooms and an excellent computer room. These developments were funded by government.

A library has also been established in one of Memel's three primary schools, with donations facilitated by the Rotary Clubs of South Africa and the United States.

A new community centre and police station are planned for the future.

A badly needed new health clinic has also been built, but as of May 2019 it is not yet equipped and not yet open.

For decades the main highway that bypasses Memel was dangerous due to a combination of its badly neglected state and speeding motorists. In 2015 work was finally completed and the road was resurfaced, making travel a safer experience. However, as of May 2019 large potholes are once more beginning to appear.

== Economy ==
The economy of the Memel-Zamani area is that of a typical rural community on South Africa's plateau where livestock farming and maize cultivation dominate.

Tourism is also important, with the bird life, the natural environment of the surrounding mountains and wetlands continuing to attract visitors.

In the early 2000s, with the influx of house-buyers from the cities and overseas, house prices moved from the R50 000 level to around the R600 000 mark but this trend has now slowed. Memel's estate agents reported little business after the worldwide recession of 2008.

Residents of the town have traditionally kept gardens and small orchards of fruit trees. Some newcomers have expanded that practice by developing permaculture gardens, based on rainwater and storm water run-off. Local organic gardens now produce dozens of vegetable varieties in summer, as well as butter, yoghurt and cheese. A Farmers Market takes place on some weeks during the growing season. Four separate houses have been constructed by methods of natural building, including rammed-earth and straw-bale. Solar and wind power are suited to the area and much new development aspires to be off-grid. Memel Organics have been the main proponent of sustainable living, having established extensive permaculture gardens. In November 2014, they opened Memel Organics Boutique Guest Houses much of which was built using rammed earth techniques and utilises solar water heaters for radiant hydronic underfloor heating.

Some of these developments have reached the adjoining township of Zamani, but still the overwhelming majority in Zamani live in poverty. Unemployment there is estimated to be between 50-75% with most people surviving on government benefits, small vegetable gardens and remittances sent by relatives employed in Gauteng province. Government has provided running water and solar powered streetlights.

== Media ==
The birth of democracy in South Africa also gave rise to a healthy democratic press in Memel-Zamani. As of 2013, two publications are printed and distributed in the town by local entrepreneurs, The Memel Chronicle and Memel News and Views. Typical of a society trying to emerge from a dark, authoritarian past, this birth of a free press in the town proved controversial with Memel News and Views being branded as dangerous and revolutionary by some, and the Memel Chronicle being regarded as attempting to maintain the old order. Things reached a head in 2012 with the towns post mistress refusing to allow the editor of Memel News and Views to use post office facilities for the distribution of the publication and other businesses in town following suit.

The 2015 movie "Free State" was filmed in and around Memel.
