= M84 (Johannesburg) =

Metropolitan route in the Greater Johannesburg, South Africa

Metropolitan route M84

Route information
- Maintained by Johannesburg Roads Agency and Gauteng Department of Roads and Transport
- Length: 7.5 km (4.7 mi)

Major junctions
- South end: M32 in Spartan

- M90 near Edleen M89 in Birchleigh; R25 in Norkem Park

- North end: M88 in Norkem Park

Location
- Country: South Africa

Highway system
- Numbered routes of South Africa
← M83	→ M85

The M84 is a short metropolitan route in Greater Johannesburg, South Africa. The entire route is within the city of Kempton Park.

== Route ==
The M84 begins at a junction with the M32 road (Plane Road) at the north-eastern corner of the Spartan suburb of Kempton Park. It begins by going northwards as Kelvin Street, through Esther Park Extension 9 (where Festival Mall is located; west of Kempton Park CBD), to reach a junction with the M90 road (CR Swart Drive).

It continues northwards as Kelvin Street, through the eastern part of the Edleen suburb, becoming Panorama Avenue, to cross into the eastern part of the Van Riebeeck Park suburb and bypass the Van Riebeeck Park Railway Station, where it becomes Soutpansberg Drive. It heads north, entering the Birchleigh suburb, meeting the M89 road (Elgin Road) and becoming Mooirvier Drive, to cross the R25 road (Modderfontein Road) and enter the suburb of Norkem Park. It continues north, through the western part of Norkem Park, to end at a junction with the M88 road (Pongolarivier Drive) east of the Birch Acres suburb.
