= M88 (Johannesburg) =

Metropolitan route in Greater Johannesburg, South Africa

Metropolitan route M88

Route information
- Maintained by Johannesburg Roads Agency and Gauteng Department of Roads and Transport

Major junctions
- West end: R25 in Esther Park
- M39 in Esther Park; M90 in Edleen; R25 in Terenure M86 in Birch Acres M84 in Norkem Park
- East end: R25 in Birchleigh North

Location
- Country: South Africa

Highway system
- Numbered routes of South Africa
| ← M86 | → M89 |

The M88 is a short metropolitan route in Greater Johannesburg, South Africa. The entire route is in the city of Kempton Park. It is made up of two disconnected sections.

== Route ==
=== First Section ===
The M88 begins at a junction with the R25 road (Modderfontein Road) at the western end of Esther Park Extension 1 in Kempton Park. It begins by going eastwards as Parkland Avenue, through Esther Park Extension 1, to cross the M39 road (Zuurfontein Road; Isando Road), enter Esther Park Proper and curve towards the north-east. It then meets the M90 road (CR Swart Drive) and heads northwards as Rienart Avenue, through the western part of the Edleen suburb (where Kempton Gate Shopping Centre is located), to meet the R25 road (Modderfontein Road) again and enter the Terenure suburb, where it ends at a junction with Orangerivier Drive.

=== Second Section ===
The M88's second section begins in the Birch Acres suburb at a junction with Paradysvink Avenue. It heads north-east as Pongolarivier Drive, meeting the northern terminus of the M86 road (Kwartel Road), to meet the northern terminus of the M84 road (Mooirivier Drive), where it crosses into the northern part of the Norkem Park suburb. It continues north-east to reach a junction with Mooifontein Road. It becomes Mooifontein Road southwards, separating Norkem Park to the west from Birchleigh North to the east, to reach its end at another junction with the R25 road (Modderfontein Road).
