= List of reportedly haunted locations in South Africa =

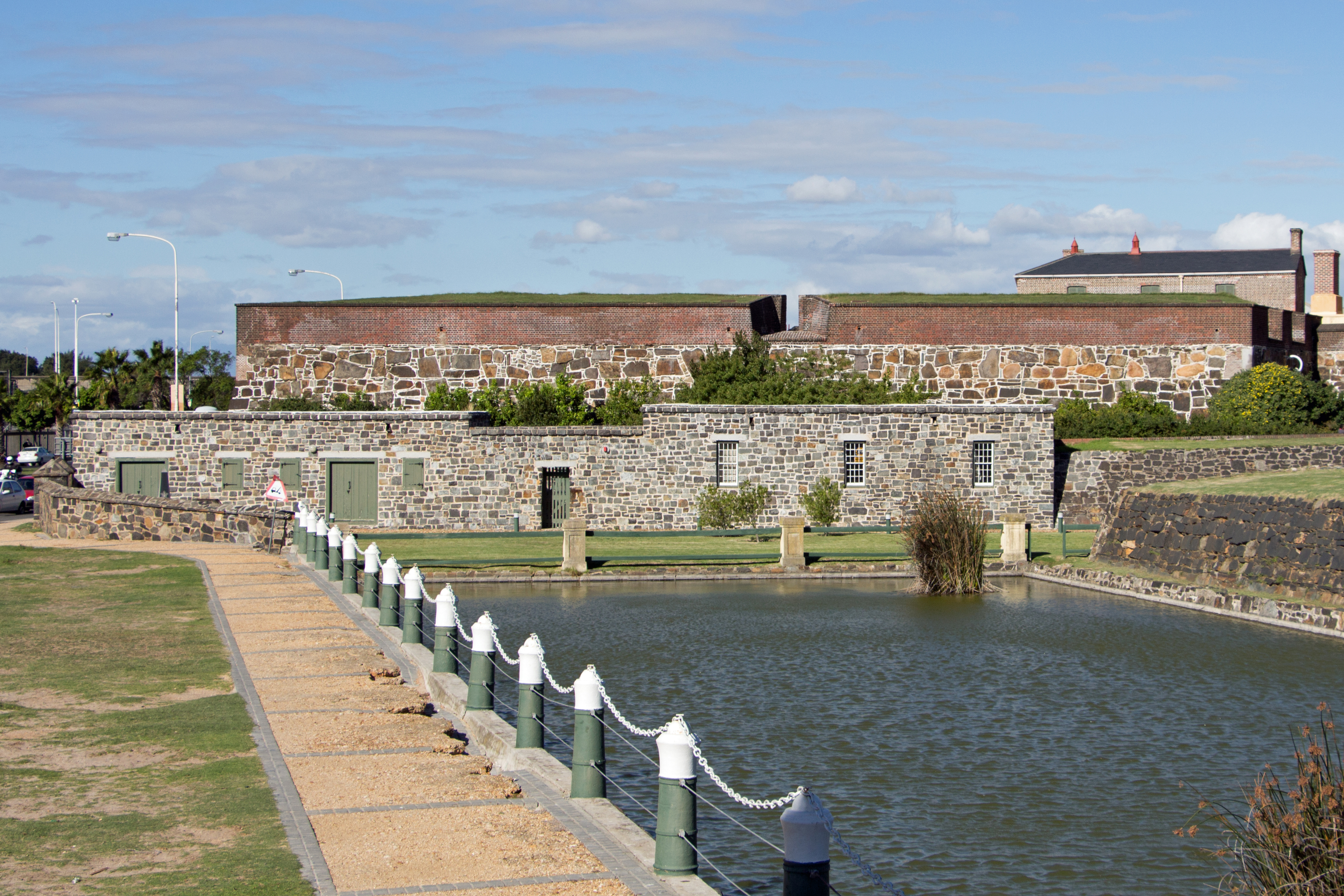
Castle of Good Hope

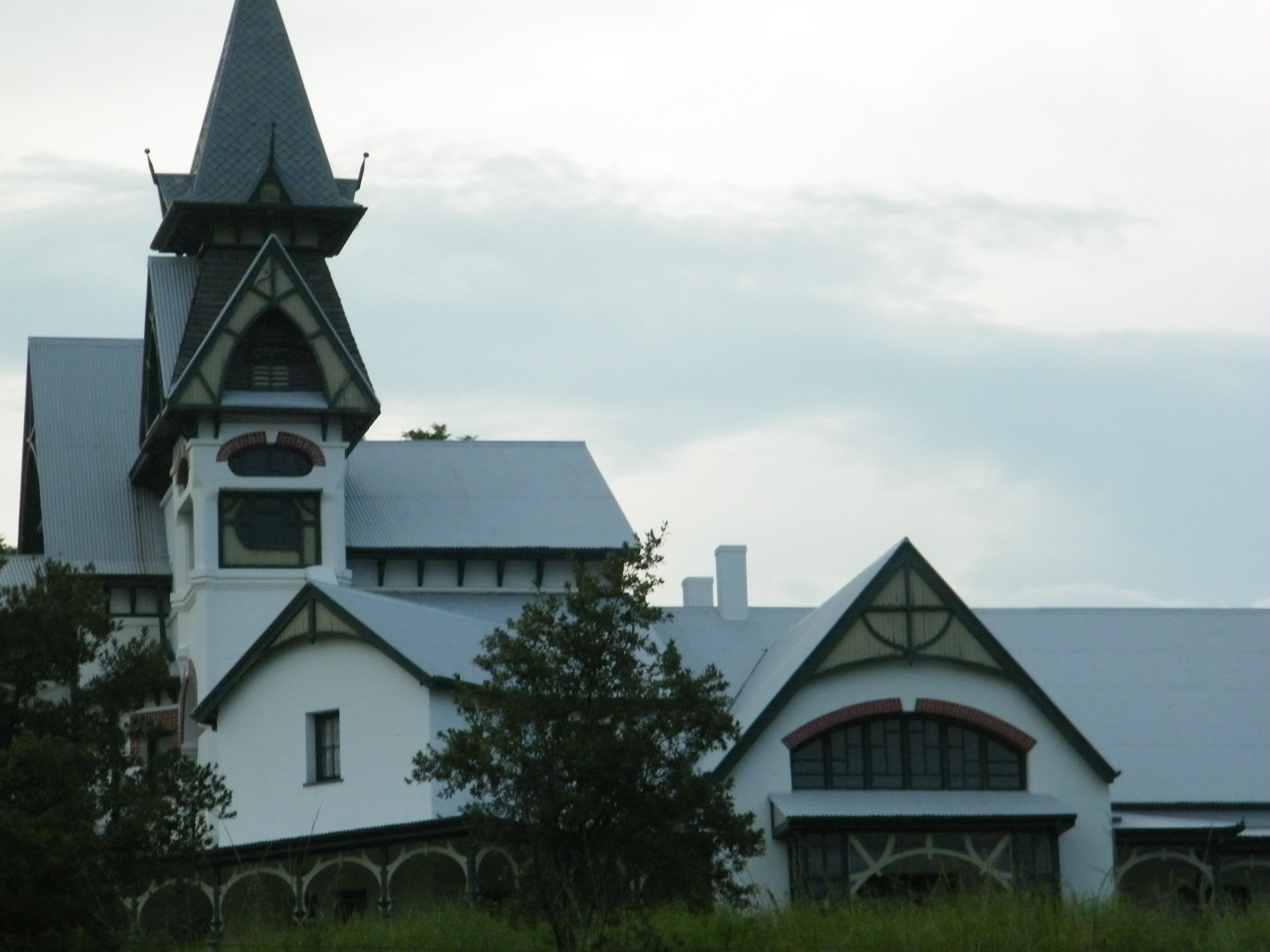
Erasmus Castle

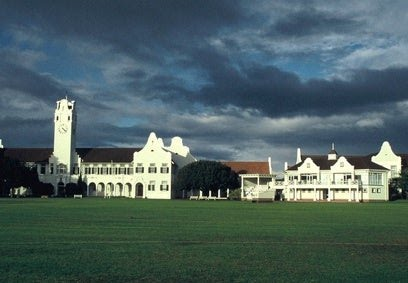
Grey High School

The following is a list of reportedly haunted locations in South Africa.

== Haunted locations ==
- Castle of Good Hope in Cape Town
- Erasmus Castle: in Pretoria 'Die Spookhuis' or Erasmus Castle has local residents often reporting strange noises and ghost sightings in and around the Victorian mansion. Paranormal activity includes lit windows in the uninhabited mansion, a residual apparition of a victorian lady in a black dress can be seen in the windows who pulls back the curtain and people hearing moaning at night.
- Hostel in Philippolis, Free State: On the right as you enter the oldest town of the Free State you will see this huge building. Today it is used as a hostel but in the 1800 it was known as the Castle of Philippolis. Rumor has it that there was a suicide in room 56 on the top floor and the ghost can still be seen. Children have reported someone touching them and seeing a cloud floating in the halls.
- Fort Frederick: In Eastern Cape, is a fort built by the British during 1799 in Algoa Bay that is reportedly haunted by theatrical ghosts of a Shakespearian play.
- Foxwood House in Johannesburg. Paranormal activity includes mysterious footsteps and visitors seeing an anonymous spectral woman with an anonymous child on the balcony of this building.
- Kempton Park Hospital: This abandoned hospital in Kempton Park, Gauteng is frequented by thrill-seekers and ghost hunters.
- St Catherine's School, Germiston: The first reported ghost sighting at St Catherine's occurred on 17 August 1972, when a janitor cleaning the school hall after hours claimed to have been chased into the quad by an amorphous grey apparition or "spook" with "glowing red eyes". From the beginning of 1977, a wave of sightings followed of a "grey, hooded figure swaddled in flowing robes", often accompanied by a "'wailing' sound". The ghost, said to haunt the school hall, the chapel, the basement and a number of classrooms in the eastern wing, was soon dubbed Patrick, after one of the school's houses, St Patrick's. After 1977, ghost sightings at St Catherine's mostly ceased, although stories of paranormal happenings at the school persist to the present.
- Nottingham Road Hotel: A hotel in KwaZulu-Natal, where the ghost of a former barmaid is said to still wander the hotel moving pots, light fixtures, and sheets, as well as ringing the service bell.
- Old Presidency: In Bloemfontein, was the official residence of the president of the former Orange Free State. The stables at the back of the building are thought to be haunted with several reports of people hearing carriages moving into the stables. The premises reportedly house the ghost of a dog with many people hearing ephemeral barking at night. There are also many stories of children being spotted within the building due to the buildings tenure as a school and hostel.
- The Old Gaol (Grahamstown): Built in Grahamstown in 1824, the Old Gaol was a prison when martial law ruled in the old town. “Dead men walking” - those sentenced to death - were led from the Old Goal to the military parade ground for public hanging. The last victim of such a death was Henry Nicholls, executed in 1862 after being convicted of rape. That this was not an offense punishable by death is, some say, the reason for his restlessness. Now his spirit is supposedly doomed to repeat the sombre walk - back and forth from gaol to gallows - perhaps for eternity.
- Somerset Hospital: South Africa's oldest hospital in Green Point, Cape Town, where resident ghosts reportedly include Sister Henrietta Stockdale, a blonde girl combing her hair and others that roam the corridors at night.
- Grey High School in Port Elizabeth is well known for its paranormal occurrences. Tales of the school's past rectors that wander the corridors at night and past matrons that haunt the boarding house are frequent and numerous.
- Old Jail in Philippolis: Found in the heart of the oldest town in the Free-State, the old jail of Philippolis is said to be one of the most haunted places in South-Africa. Once used as a barracks for military to a jail. Story goes that after a Giekwa got in a car accident they took his body to the jail and he died in one of the cells. Up until this day you can hear him play the violin.
- Kensington Sanatorium in Johannesburg: The staff sometimes have to go up into the tower to dig out very old archives, and in the archive room murmurs can be heard. The story goes that three holy family sisters who were led by Mother Odele would have there staff meetings with her senior staff in the now archive room. The apparition that appears in the window is a residual ghost and is believed to be Mother Adele.
- Die Ou Raadsaal in Pretoria: An Orb of light can be seen in the main chamber at the Ou Raadsaal. This historical building also has ties to Paul Kruger and the Kruger Millions.
- Sunnyside Park Hotel in Johannesburg: The Ball Room has an apparition of a lady that dances in front of the fireplace next to the grand piano. The Club Room has a corner that sometimes the sweet smell of pipe tobacco can be smelt. The third floor has a resident who never left the hotel and reportedly likes to disturb the night service trays left outside the rooms.
- Kensington Cave in Johannesburg: The Foster Gang took refuge in the Kensington cave that was surrounded by police and all three committed suicide in the cave. Reports of strange paranormal happenings have been heard by the residents who reside close the cave.
- Jeppe High School for Boys in Johannesburg: The story of Jeppe High School for Boys is the Af Kop Vrou who was a teacher at the school and whose son also attended the school. The son attended an athletics day at the school and tragically died in a freak javelin accident. The teacher subsequently committed suicide by hanging herself from the dead tree on the koppie with a piano wire. The apparition of the Af Kop Vrou can be seen at the dead tree and her son is said to sit on the stairs of Sable House late at night. The Payne Hall used to house a portrait painting that changed colour and photos of the Af Kop Vrou, these have all been removed due to superstition.
- The Old Gaol in Heidelberg: A full body apparition of Harry as everyone at the Gaol likes to call him has been documented and the front heavy door is also known to slam shut. A female prisoner has also been captured here.
- The Codfather Village in Johannesburg: A group of abandoned restaurants in Morningside known as the Codfather Village was the site of the Sandton Triple homicides. Three staff members were locked into the walk in fridge during a robbery on 27 January 2010. This location has paranormal activity, EVP's and a general eeriness that something is not right with this location.
- Africana Library in Kimberley: Supposedly haunted by its first librarian, Bertrand Dyer, who committed suicide after he was caught defrauding the library. It is said that Dyer haunts the special collection which includes examples of early printing dating from 1475 and manuscripts dating from the 17th century. Some have heard the librarian’s footsteps pacing between rooms.

== See also ==
- List of reportedly haunted locations
