= Hennops River =

River in South Africa

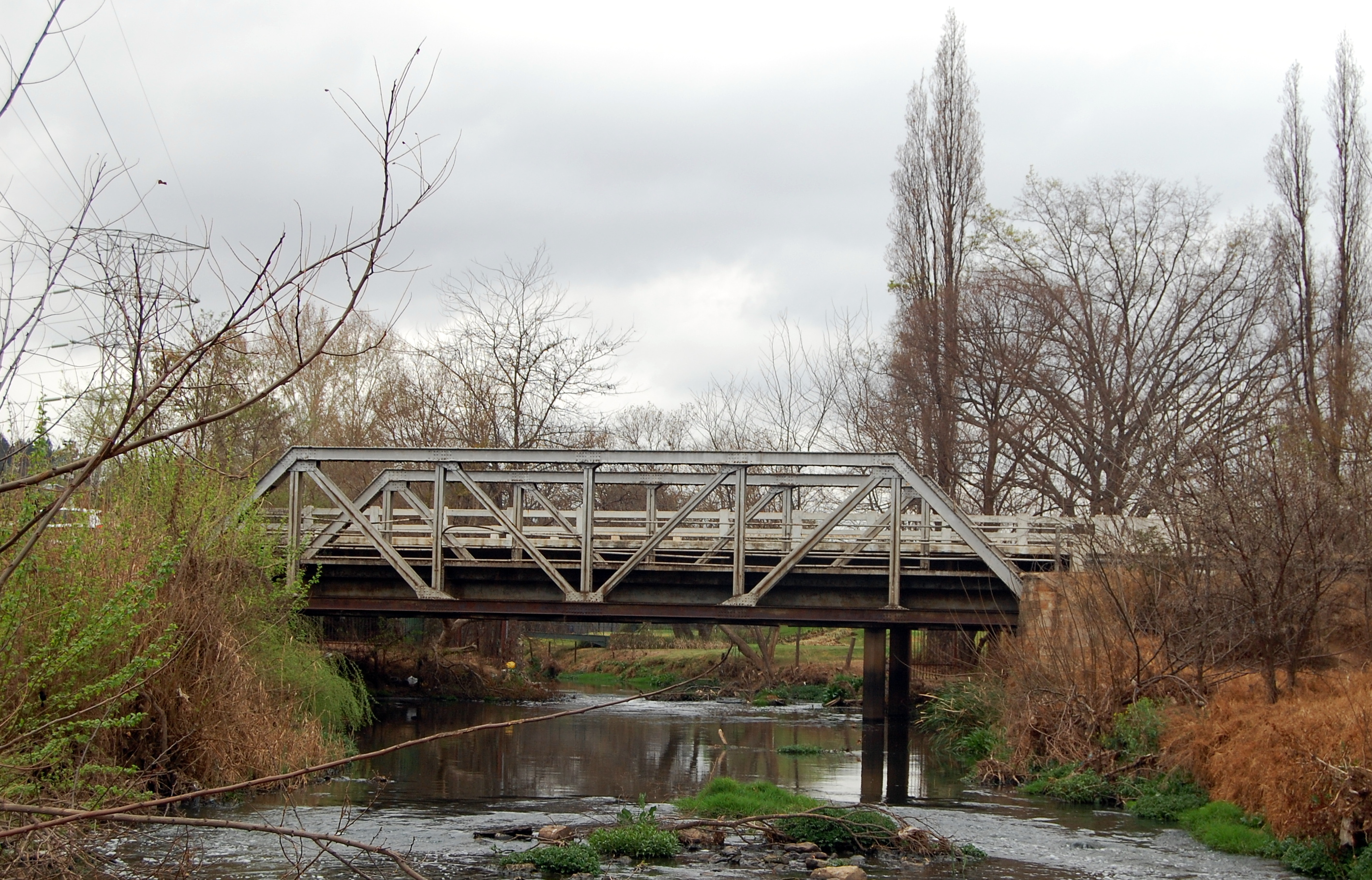
- The Wierda Bridge over the Hennops River

- Location of the Hennops River mouth

Location
- Country: South Africa
- Province: Gauteng

Physical characteristics
- Source
  - location: Kempton Park
- Mouth: Crocodile River
  - coordinates: 25°50′37″S 27°55′56″E
  - elevation: 1,212 m (3,976 ft)
- Length: 94 km (58 mi)

Basin features
- River system: Crocodile River (Limpopo)
- Tributaries
  - right: Rietvlei River

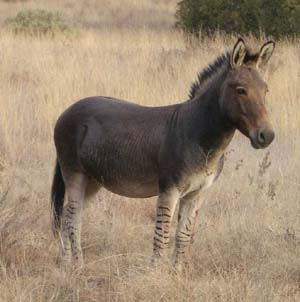
A Zonkey at the Hennops 4x4 trail, Gauteng, South Africa

The Hennops River is one of the larger rivers that drains Gauteng, South Africa. It has its source near Kempton Park, east of Johannesburg and meets the Crocodile River shortly before Hartbeespoort Dam. It is one of Gauteng's most polluted rivers.

== Course ==
The Hennops River starts in Terenure, Kempton Park, and flows in a northerly direction towards Tembisa township. It then flows past Olifantsfontein and meets the Sesmyl Spruit which flows out of the Rietvlei Dam. The river then turns north-west flowing through the centre of Centurion. The river continues in this direction flowing through the foothills of the Magaliesberg before flowing into the Crocodile River on its right bank near the Hartbeespoort Dam.

== Dams ==
The Rietvlei Dam, which provides water to City of Tshwane, as well as numerous farm dams are situated in the Hennops River Basin. Lake Centurion as well as numerous weirs are situated on the river.

== Pollution ==
The Hennops River is one of Gauteng's heavily polluted rivers. Insufficient and poorly maintained sanitation facilities in Tembisa, Ivory Park, Olifantsfontein and Erasmia have turned the river into an open sewer. AfriForum gathered water samples from the Hennops River and according to the results, more than one million units of the indicator microbe Escherichia coli were present per 100 ml of water. The health risk is high for people coming into full or partial contact with water having more than 2000 colony forming units per 100 ml.

Untreated or partially treated sewage also contains high concentrations of phosphate and nitrate, which contribute to the eutrophication problems in Hartbeespoort Dam. In 2020, the FRESH NGO installed litter traps at Clayville township in Tembisa, and locals were employed to remove the waste which soon accumulated.

== Incidents ==
In April 2025, three constables who went missing were discovered at the Hennops River along the N1 in Centurion. They had been missing for a week and were reportedly on their way from Bloemfontein in the Free State to Limpopo province, where they were deployed.Police also discovered two more bodies, one of that of the South African Police Services groundsman from Lyttleton police station and one of a civilian.

== Tourist attractions ==
The valley of the river is a weekend and holiday destination for residents of the nearby cities. The banks of the Hennops are a popular location for hiking, fishing, camping, and picnicking. It is crossed by two small suspension bridges, one at Centurion Mall, and the other at Hennops Pride . There are also resorts and a 4x4 trail.

== See also ==
- Magaliesberg
