= M89 (Johannesburg) =

Metropolitan route in Greater Johannesburg, South Africa

Metropolitan route M89

Route information
- Maintained by Johannesburg Roads Agency and Gauteng Department of Roads and Transport
- Length: 2.6 km (1.6 mi)

Major junctions
- West end: R25 / M86 at Van Riebeeck Park

- M84 at Birchleigh

- East end: M57 at Birchleigh

Location
- Country: South Africa

Highway system
- Numbered routes of South Africa
← M88	→ M90

The M89 is a short metropolitan route in Greater Johannesburg, South Africa. It consists of only one street (Elgin Road) in the city of Kempton Park.

== Route ==
The M89 begins at a junction with the M86 road (De Wiekus Rd) in the Van Riebeeck Park suburb, just south of the M86's junction with the R25 road. It goes eastwards as Elgin Road, passing by the old Kempton Park Hospital, meeting the M84 road (Mooiriver Drive; Soutpansberg Drive) and entering the Birchleigh suburb, to reach its end at a roundabout junction with the M57 road (Pretoria Road).
