= River End =

The River End is a name given to one end of many sports stadia. It may refer to:

- River End at the Adelaide Oval
- River End at the Bellerive Oval
- River End at Carrow Road
- River End at the County Cricket Ground, Chelmsford
- River End at the County Ground, Taunton
- River End at the Himachal Pradesh Cricket Association Stadium
- River End at the National Cricket Stadium, Grenada
- Hennops River End at SuperSport Park
- River Taff End at Sophia Gardens
- River End at Windsor Park, Dominica
