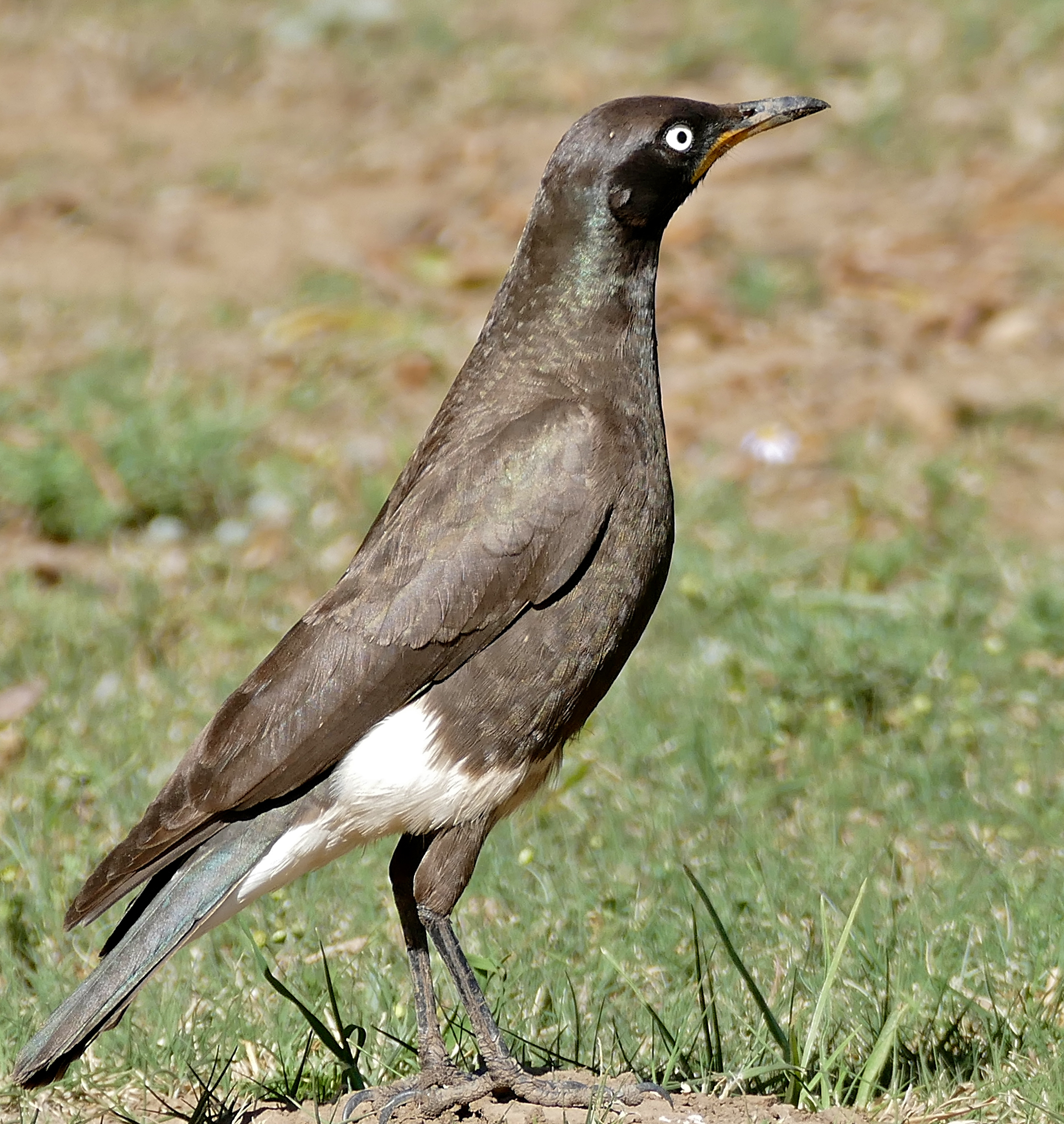
- An adult bird at Mountain Zebra N. P. in the Eastern Cape, South Africa

Conservation status
- Least Concern (IUCN 3.1)

Scientific classification
- Kingdom: Animalia
- Phylum: Chordata
- Class: Aves
- Order: Passeriformes
- Family: Sturnidae
- Genus: Lamprotornis
- Species: L. bicolor

Binomial name
- Lamprotornis bicolor (Gmelin, JF, 1789)
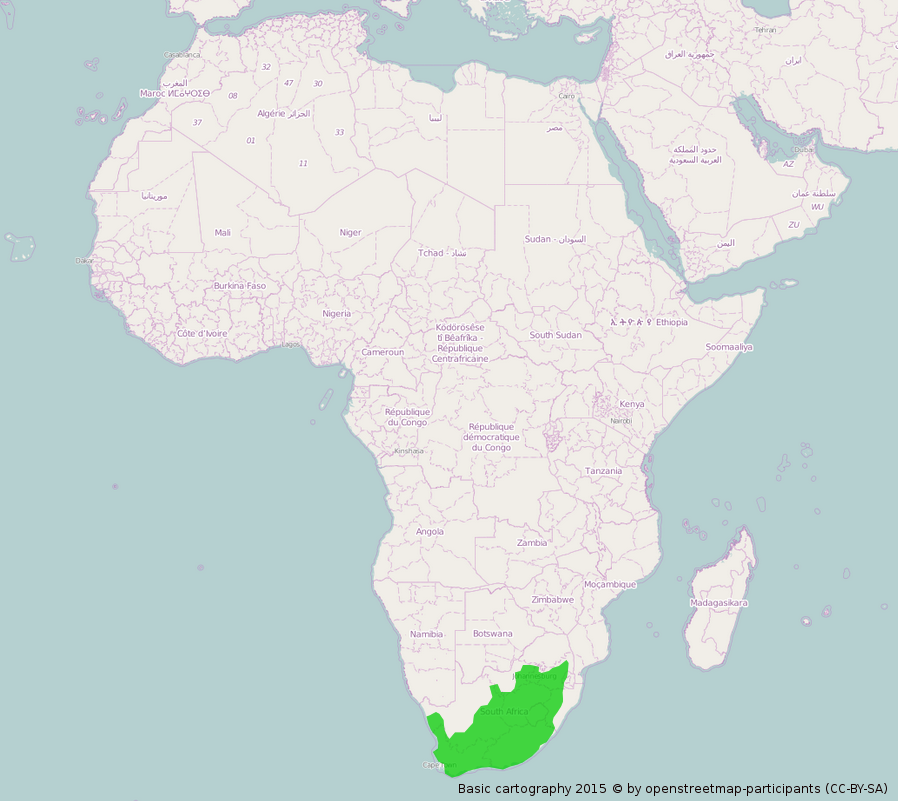
- native range

Synonyms
- Spreo bicolor

= Pied starling =

Species of bird

The pied starling or African pied starling (Lamprotornis bicolor) is a bird endemic to South Africa, Lesotho and Eswatini. It is common in most of its range, but largely absent from the arid northwest and the eastern lowlands of South Africa. It is found in open habitats such as grassland, karoo scrub, thornbush and agricultural land, and often associates with farm animals.

== Taxonomy ==
The pied starling was formally described in 1789 by the German naturalist Johann Friedrich Gmelin in his revised and expanded edition of Carl Linnaeus's Systema Naturae. He placed it with the thrushes in the genus Turdus and coined the binomial name Turdus bicolor. Gmelin based his description on "Le merle brun du cap de Bonne Espérance" that had been described in 1775 by the French polymath Georges-Louis Leclerc, Comte de Buffon in his book Histoire Naturelle des Oiseaux. The pied starling is now placed in the genus Lamprotornis that was introduced in 1820 by the Dutch zoologist Coenraad Jacob Temminck. The species is monotypic: no subspecies are recognised.

== Description ==
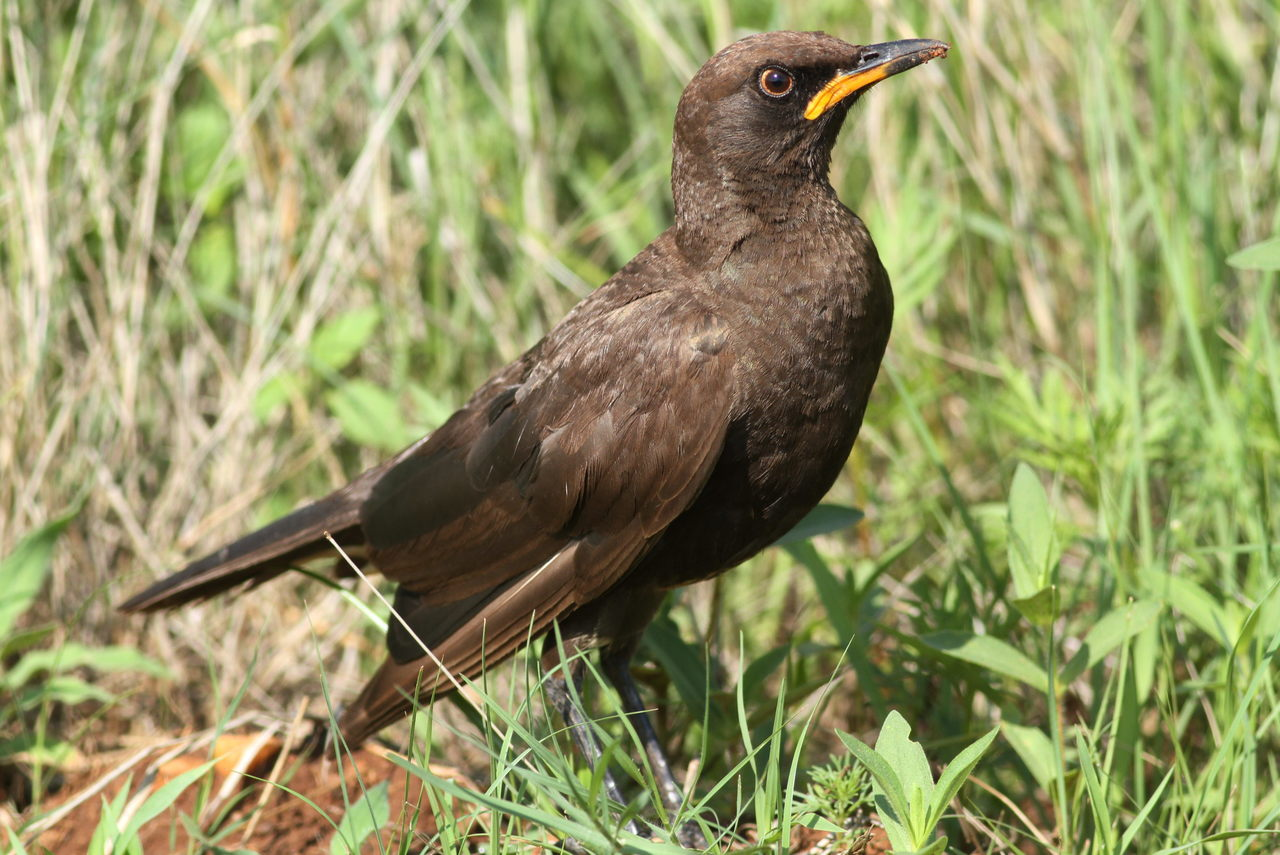
A juvenile at Rietvlei Nature Reserve, Pretoria

The adult of this 27–28 cm (11 in) long starling has mainly dully glossed black plumage except for a white lower belly and undertail. It has a white iris and yellow lower mandible. The sexes are alike, but the juvenile has unglossed plumage, a brown iris and a dull yellow lower mandible. There are no subspecies. This species has a number of calls, but the most familiar is a skeer kerrra kerrra. There is also a soft warbling song.

== Behaviour ==
=== Breeding ===
The pied starling usually nests in tunnels in river banks, but will use holes in buildings, straw bales or natural tree holes. There is a record of a nest being constructed in a wrecked ship 200 m (660 ft) from the shore. The nest is lined with a wide variety of plant material and items of human waste such as paper and rope. The female typically lays four eggs, though clutches of two to six are known. The eggs are blue-green, immaculate or with some red spots.

The female alone incubates for 14–16 days, and the chicks fledge in another 22–28 days. Both parents feed the chicks, assisted by helpers, which are typically subadult or unmated birds. This cooperative breeding is reinforced by mutual allofeeding between adults, behaviour reinforced by the bright gape, a feature normally lost in adults of most bird species.

This starling is commonly double-brooded. It may be parasitised by the great spotted cuckoo and greater honeyguide.

=== Roosting ===
The pied starling is gregarious and when not breeding will form large flocks, sometimes numbering more than 1000 birds. Its roosts may be shared by lesser kestrels or wattled starlings. It will feed with European starlings, but they rarely roost together.

=== Feeding ===
Like other starlings, the pied starling is an omnivore, taking a wide range of invertebrates, seeds and berries, but its diet is mainly insects, including many ants and termites. It will take figs from gardens and some human food discards. Foraging is frequently near livestock, with birds feeding on insects disturbed by the animals and also perching on cattle or sheep to remove ectoparasites.

The pied starling has sometimes been seen as a pest when it takes soft fruit such as grapes or figs, and was also itself considered good eating. However, it is little persecuted at present.

== Status ==
This species has a large range, estimated at 790,000 km^{2} (310,000 sq mi). The population size has not been quantified, but it is believed to be large as the species is described as 'common' in at least parts of its range. It is not believed to approach the thresholds for the population decline criterion of the IUCN Red List (i.e. declining more than 30% in ten years or three generations). For these reasons, the species is evaluated as Least Concern.
