= Nimrod Park =

- Location within Gauteng Location within South Africa
- Coordinates: 26°05′26″S 28°14′25″E
- Country: South Africa
- Province: Gauteng
- Municipality: Ekurhuleni
- Main Place: Kempton Park

Area
  - Total: 0.53 km^{2} (0.20 sq mi)

Population (2011)
  - Total: 1,061
  - Density: 2,000/km^{2} (5,200/sq mi)

Racial makeup (2011)
  - White: 72.1%
  - Black African: 23.9%
  - Indian/Asian: 2.1%
  - Coloured: 1.8%
  - Other: 0.1%

First languages (2011)
  - Afrikaans: 50.6%
  - English: 32.3%
  - Zulu: 3.3%
  - Northern Sotho: 1.7%
  - Other: 12.1%
- Time zone: UTC+2 (SAST)

Nimrod Park, also spelt Nimrodpark, is a suburb of Kempton Park, in Gauteng province, South Africa.
