= Croydon, Kempton Park =

Croydon
- Location within Gauteng Location within South Africa
- Coordinates: 26.1314°S 28.1971°E
- Country: South Africa
- Province: Gauteng
- Municipality: Ekurhuleni
- Main Place: Kempton Park

Area
  - Total: 2.01 km^{2} (0.78 sq mi)

Population (2011)
  - Total: 5,223
  - Density: 2,600/km^{2} (6,730/sq mi)

Racial makeup (2011)
  - White: 46.66%
  - Black African: 33.51%
  - Indian/Asian: 14.69%
  - Coloured: 5.39%
  - Other: 0.80%

First languages (2011)
  - English: 59.53%
  - Afrikaans: 16.14%
  - Zulu: 5.53%
  - Other: 4.29%
  - Northern Sotho: 3.83%
- Time zone: UTC+2 (SAST)

Croydon is a western suburb of Kempton Park, in Gauteng province, South Africa.
