= Aston Manor, Kempton Park =

Aston Manor
- Location within Gauteng Location within South Africa
- Coordinates: 26°5′12″S 28°14′44″E
- Country: South Africa
- Province: Gauteng
- Municipality: Ekurhuleni
- Main Place: Kempton Park

Area
  - Total: 0.96 km^{2} (0.37 sq mi)

Population (2011)
  - Total: 1,961
  - Density: 2,000/km^{2} (5,300/sq mi)

Racial makeup (2011)
  - Black African: 15.8%
  - Coloured: 1.0%
  - Indian/Asian: 1.1%
  - White: 80.6%
  - Other: 1.6%

First languages (2011)
  - Afrikaans: 56.0%
  - English: 34.6%
  - Northern Sotho: 1.7%
  - Southern Sotho: 1.6%
  - Other: 6.0%
- Time zone: UTC+2 (SAST)
- Postal code (street): 1619
- PO box: 1630
- Area code: 010

Aston Manor is a residential suburb of Kempton Park, in Gauteng province, South Africa.
