= Allen Grove, Gauteng =

Allen Grove
- Location within Gauteng Location within South Africa
- Coordinates: 26.082°S 28.232°E
- Country: South Africa
- Province: Gauteng
- Municipality: Ekurhuleni
- Main Place: Kempton Park

Area
  - Total: 1.28 km^{2} (0.49 sq mi)

Population (2011)
  - Total: 2,801
  - Density: 2,190/km^{2} (5,670/sq mi)

Racial makeup (2011)
  - Black African: 8.2%
  - Coloured: 1.2%
  - Indian/Asian: 1.3%
  - White: 88.3%
  - Other: 1.0%

First languages (2011)
  - Afrikaans: 60.8%
  - English: 32.6%
  - Northern Sotho: 1.2%
  - Other: 5.4%
- Time zone: UTC+2 (SAST)
- Postal code (street): 1619

Allen Grove is a residential suburb of Kempton Park, in Gauteng province, South Africa, just north of the CBD. In the 2011 census the population counted 2,800.
