= Kempton Park Hospital =

Defunct district hospital in Gauteng

- Gauteng Department of Health
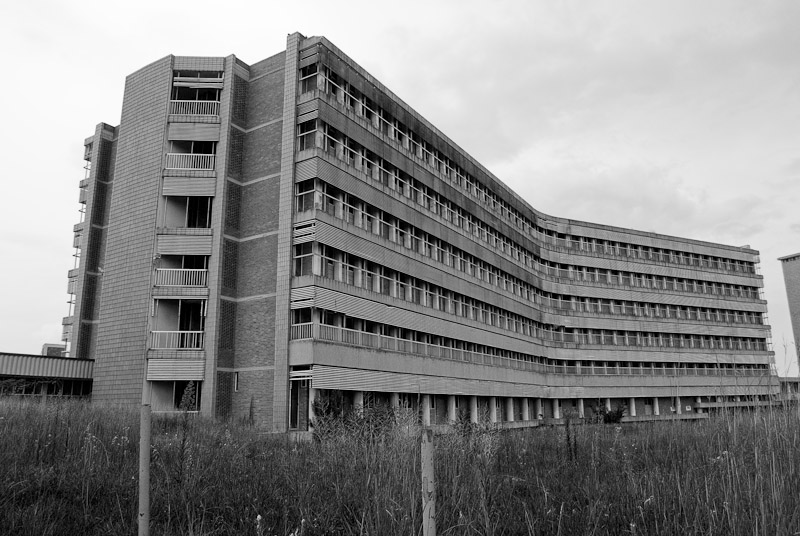
- Exterior view of Kempton Park Hospital

Geography
- Location: Elgin Road, Kempton Park, Gauteng, South Africa
- Coordinates: 26.073057°S 28.215981°E

Organisation
- Type: District

Services
- Beds: 300

History
- Opened: 1978
- Closed: 1996

Kempton Park Hospital was a public hospital located in Kempton Park, Ekurhuleni, Gauteng, South Africa. The facility served as a district-level hospital providing general medical and surgical services to residents in Kempton Park and the East Rand. It was operated by the Transvaal Provincial Health Department (now Gauteng Department of Health), primarily during apartheid, before its abrupt closure in 1996.

== History ==
The hospital was constructed in the late 1970s and opened in 1978 to serve the growing population of Kempton Park and surrounding areas. It was reported to have approximately 300 beds at the time it was operational.

The hospital was closed in 1996 after years of underuse and staffing challenges, leaving the facility unused for decades. When the hospital closed, medical equipment and hospital assets reportedly worth millions of rand remained on site. The continued abandonment of the facility, along with the loss of usable equipment, later became a point of criticism amid ongoing shortages in public healthcare infrastructure in Gauteng. Since its closure, the hospital building has fallen into a state of disrepair and has become derelict.

== Post-closure and current status ==
After its closure, the hospital remained empty for nearly three decades, becoming locally known as a "ghost hospital", largely abandoned and subject to vandalism and unauthorised access. The Gauteng Department of Health continued to pay for security to guard the derelict site, with the expense of millions of rand annually, despite no longer providing medical services there. In response to public and political pressure, the Gauteng Infrastructure Finance Agency was involved in exploring potential options for the site's future, including refurbishment, demolition, or redevelopment of a new hospital facility, possibly through a public-private partnership. Local and provincial politicians, including members of the Gauteng Provincial Legislature, have conducted oversight visits to the site and urged the provincial government to make definitive plans for the facility due to ongoing community need for healthcare services in the region.

== Future plans ==
There have been periodic announcements and proposals suggesting that a renovated or newly constructed hospital could be developed at the site to address the high demand for public health services in the area. These discussions include possible demolition of the old structure and construction of a new district hospital, although no final timetable or funding commitment has been confirmed.

== Controversies ==
During its operational years, Kempton Park Hospital was embroiled in a medical fraud case. Between 1982 and 1990, André Esterhuizen, who did not possess a medical degree and was a high school dropout, posed as a paediatrician at the hospital and treated paediatric patients. Esterhuizen had an extremely high IQ and claimed to have studied medical books for years. In 1992, Esterhuizen was convicted on multiple charges including impersonating a doctor, culpable homicide, and defrauding patients after admitting to having treated thousands of patients without proper qualifications, and later court proceedings establishing that several infants died while under his care. He was sentenced to 18 years imprisonment.
