= Rietvlei Nature Reserve =

Nature reserve in Pretoria, South Africa

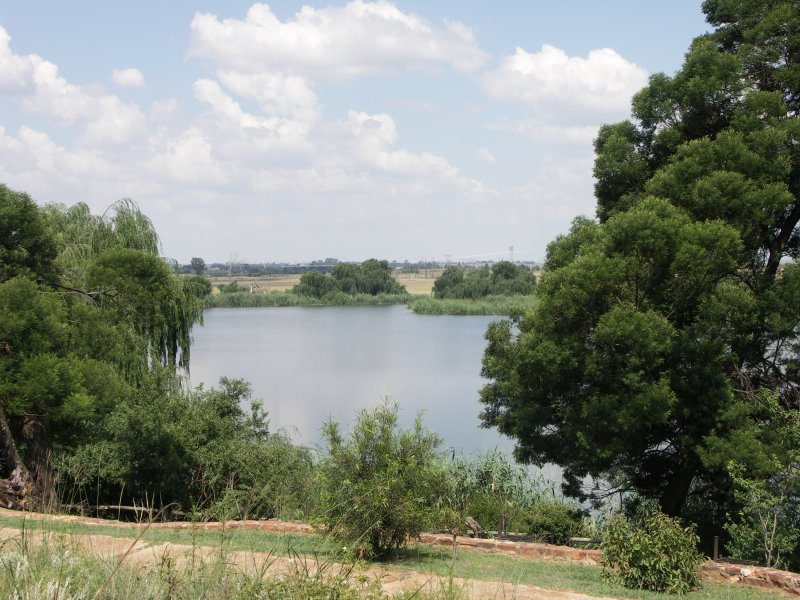
- View of the Rietvlei Dam from the picnic area
- Interactive map of Rietvlei Nature Reserve
- Type: Nature reserve
- Location: South Africa
- Nearest city: Pretoria, Gauteng
- Coordinates: 25°53′49″S 28°17′38″E
- Area: 4,000 hectares (40 km^{2})
- Established: 1929 - as a conservation area; 1948 - proclaimed; 5 March 2014 - Declaration of a Nature Reserve
- Administrator: City of Tshwane
- Hiking trails: Two: One 14 km day trail; One 21 km trail over three days
- Website: City of Tshwane page on Rietvlei

Rietvlei Nature Reserve, located in southern Pretoria, is about 4,000 hectares (40 km^{2}) in size, and includes the entirety of the Rietvlei Dam which impounds the Rietvlei River, in Gauteng, South Africa. The reserve is wedged between the R21 highway (OR Tambo Airport highway) on the western side and the R50 (Delmas-Bapsfontein) road on the north-east. The mean elevation above sea level is approximately 1,525 meters, with the highest point at 1,542 m and the lowest at 1,473 m, the dam’s outflow in Sesmylspruit. The reserve covers a surface area of approximately 4,003 ha or 40 km^{2}, of which the dam constitutes some 20ha. A network of roads criss-cross the entire area, which facilitates access to visitors and management.

== Flora and fauna ==
=== Trees ===
Both indigenous and exotic species of trees can be found in the reserve.

List of trees in the reserve

Indigenous

- Common hook thorn Acacia afra
- Sweet thorn Acacia karroo
- Sagewood Buddleja salviifolia
- White stinkwood Celtis africana
- River bushwillow Combretum erythrophyllum
- Highveld cabbage tree Cussonia paniculata
- Sicklebush Dichrostachys cinerea
- Bushveld bluebush Diospyros lycioides
- Puzzle bush Ehretia rigida
- Blue guarri Euclea crispa
- Pioneer spike-thorn Gymnosporia buxifolia
- Honeyscented protea Protea welwitschii
- Dogwood Rhamnus prinoides
- Nana-berry Searsia dentata
- Grassveld currant Searsia discolor
- Karee Searsia lancea
- Rock currant Searsia magalismontana
- Common wild currant Searsia pyroides
- Blue currant Searsia zeyheri
- Buffalothorn Ziziphus mucronata

Exotic

- Green wattle Racosperma decurrens
- Black wattle Racosperma mearnsii
- Red river gum Eucalyptus camaldulensis
- Bluegum Eucalyptus sp.
- Privet Ligustrum sp.
- Mulberry Morus sp.
- Ink berry Phytolacca octandra
- Platanus Platanus sp.
- White poplar Populus alba
- Oak Quercus sp.
- Black locust Robinia pseudoacacia
- Weeping willow Salix babylonica

=== Birds ===
Some 404 species of bird utilize the reserve. Birds commonly encountered include colonies of southern masked-weaver, the invasive common myna and conspicuous pied crow, buffy pipit, blacksmith and crowned lapwing on short or burnt grassland, and Cape longclaw and rufous-naped lark in denser grassland or shrubby areas. Amur falcon and barn swallow occur annually in summer. Black-shouldered kite, spotted thick-knee, cattle egret, helmeted guineafowl, Swainson's spurfowl, African palm-swift, southern red bishop, anteating chat, stone chat, capped wheatear, fork-tailed drongo and pied starling are resident or regularly seen species. Some special or less commonly seen species are Alpine swift in winter, African yellow warbler in shrubs along the flood plain, great crested grebe and maccoa duck at the dams, African cuckoo hawk, Peregrine falcon, red-throated wryneck and orange-breasted waxbill.

=== Mammals ===
The reserve carries around 1,600 individual large mammals. Cheetah, blesbuck, black wildebeest, red hartebeest, eland, common zebra, waterbuck, reedbuck, springbuck, mountain reedbuck, steenbok, grey duiker, oribi, leopard, buffalo, and hippopotamus can all be found in the reserve. There are also 4 lionesses and 2 male lions kept in a separate enclosure on the reserve. In October 2019, the Rietvlei lions were killed by poachers and since then, no lions have been kept at the reserve.

List of mammals in the reserve
- Aardvark Orycteropus afer
- Aardwolf Proteles cristatus
- African buffalo Syncerus caffer
- African civet civettictis civetta
- African clawless otter Aonyx capensis
- African pygmy mouse Mus minutoides
- African striped weasel Poecilogale albinucha
- African yellow bat Scotophilus dinganii
- Angoni vlei rat Otomys angoniensis
- Black-backed jackal Canis mesomelas
- Black rat Rattus rattus
- Black wildebeest Connochaetes gnou
- Blasius's horseshoe bat Rhinolophus blasii
- Blesbuck Damaliscus dorcas phillpsi
- Brown hyena Parahyaena brunnea
- Bushpig Potamochoerus larvatus
- Bushveld horseshoe bat Rhinolophus simulator
- Cape genet Genetta tigrina
- Cape hare Lepus capensis
- Cape porcupine Hystrix africaeaustralis
- Cape serotine Neoromicia capensis
- Caracal Caracal caracal
- Cheetah Acinonyx jubatus
- Chestnut climbing mouse Dendromus mystacalis
- Common duiker Sylvicapra grimmia
- Common eland Tragelaphus oryx
- Common genet Genetta genetta
- Common mole rat Cryptomys hottentotus
- Darling's horseshoe bat Rhinolophus darlingi
- Desert pygmy mouse Mus indutus
- Egyptian free-tailed bat Tadarida aegyptiaca
- Egyptian slit-faced bat Nycteris thebaica
- Forest shrew Myosorex varius
- Four-striped grass mouse Rhabdomys pumilio
- Geoffroy's horseshoe bat Rhinolophus clivosus
- Gray climbing mouse Dendromus melanotis
- Greater cane rat Thryonomys swinderianus
- Greenish yellow bat Scotophilus viridis
- Ground pangolin Manis temminckii
- Hartebeest Alcelaphus buselaphus
- Highveld gerbil Gerbilliscus brantsii
- Hippopotamus Hippopotamus amphibius
- House mouse Mus musculus
- Least dwarf shrew Suncus infinitesimus
- Leopard Panthera pardus
- Lesser dwarf shrew Suncus varilla
- Lesser gray-brown musk shrew Crocidura silacea
- Lesser red musk shrew Crocidura hirta
- Marsh mongoose Atilax paludinosus
- Mauritian tomb bat Taphozous mauritianus
- Meerkat Suricata suricatta
- Mohol bushbaby Galago moholi
- Mountain reedbuck Redunca fulvorufula
- Oribi Ourebia ourebi
- Plains zebra Equus quagga
- Reddish-gray musk shrew Crocidura cyanea
- Red rock rat Aethomys chrysophilus
- Rock hyrax Procavia capensis
- Rough-haired golden mole Chrysospalax villosus
- Scrub hare Lepus sexatilis
- Serval Leptailurus serval
- Slender mongoose Galerella sanguinea
- Southern African hedgehog Atelerix frontalis
- Southern multimammate mouse Mastomys coucha
- Southern reedbuck Redunca arundinum
- Springbok Antidorcas marsupialis
- Springhare Pedetes capensis
- Steenbok Raphicerus campestris
- Striped polecat Ictonyx striatus
- Swamp musk shrew Crocidura mariquensis
- Vervet monkey Chlorocebus pygerythrus
- Vlei rat Otomys irroratus
- Waterbuck Kobus ellipsiprymnus
- White rhinoceros Ceratotherium simum
- White-tailed mongoose Ichneumia albicauda
- White-tailed rat Mystromys albicaudatus

== Threats to the reserve ==
The reserve is situated in Gauteng, one of the highest population density areas in South Africa. As such it is constantly under threat by human expansion and development.

- The Ekurhuleni Metropolitan Municipality's proposed Benoni landfill site.
- Upstream pollution of the Rietvlei Dam and wetland areas.

== See also ==
- Rietvlei Dam
- Protected areas of South Africa
