= Rietvlei River =

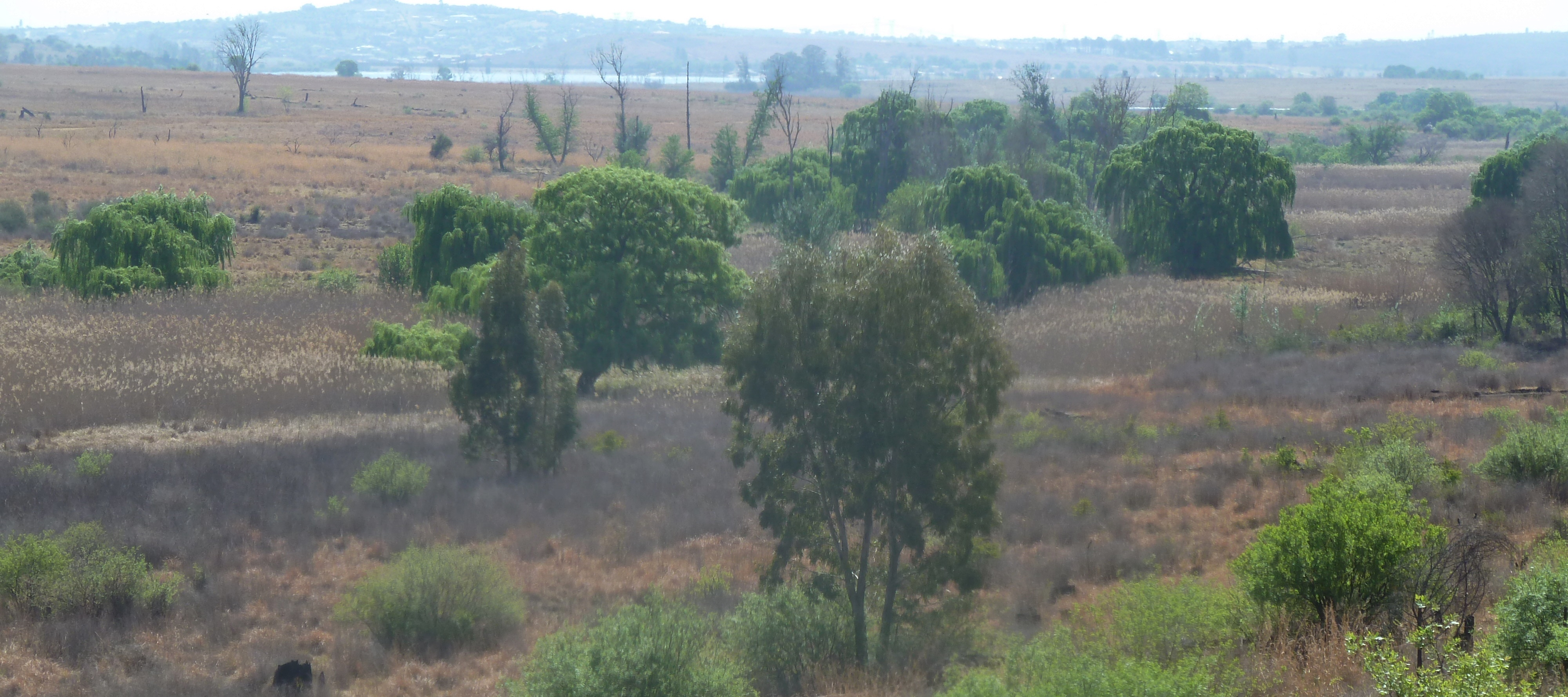
- Wetland of the Rietvlei River in Rietvlei N. R.

- Location of the Rietvlei River mouth
- Etymology: From the word for "reed" and vlei in the Afrikaans language

Location
- Country: South Africa
- Province: Gauteng

Physical characteristics
- Source: Witwatersrand
  - location: South of Pretoria
  - elevation: 1,540 m (5,050 ft)
- Mouth: Hennops River
  - coordinates: 25°52′54″S 28°17′40″E
  - elevation: 1,480 m (4,860 ft)

The Rietvlei River is a small river in central Gauteng Province, South Africa. It feeds the wetlands of the Rietvlei Nature Reserve, before it flows into Rietvlei Dam, which is one of the main sources of water for Pretoria. The river downstream of the dam, known as Sesmylspruit, is a tributary of the Hennops River and part of the Crocodile River (Limpopo) basin.

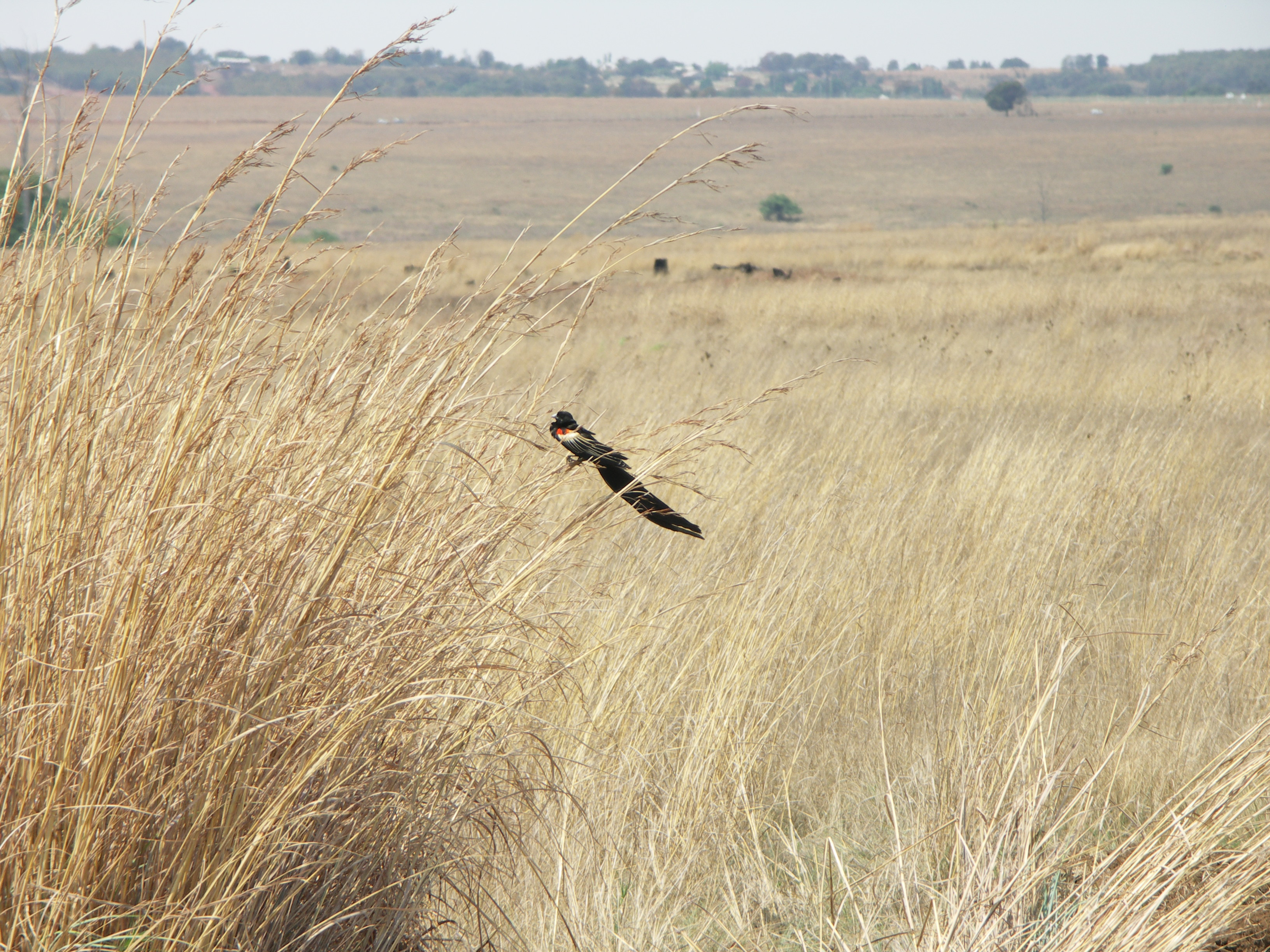
The Rietvlei river wetlands

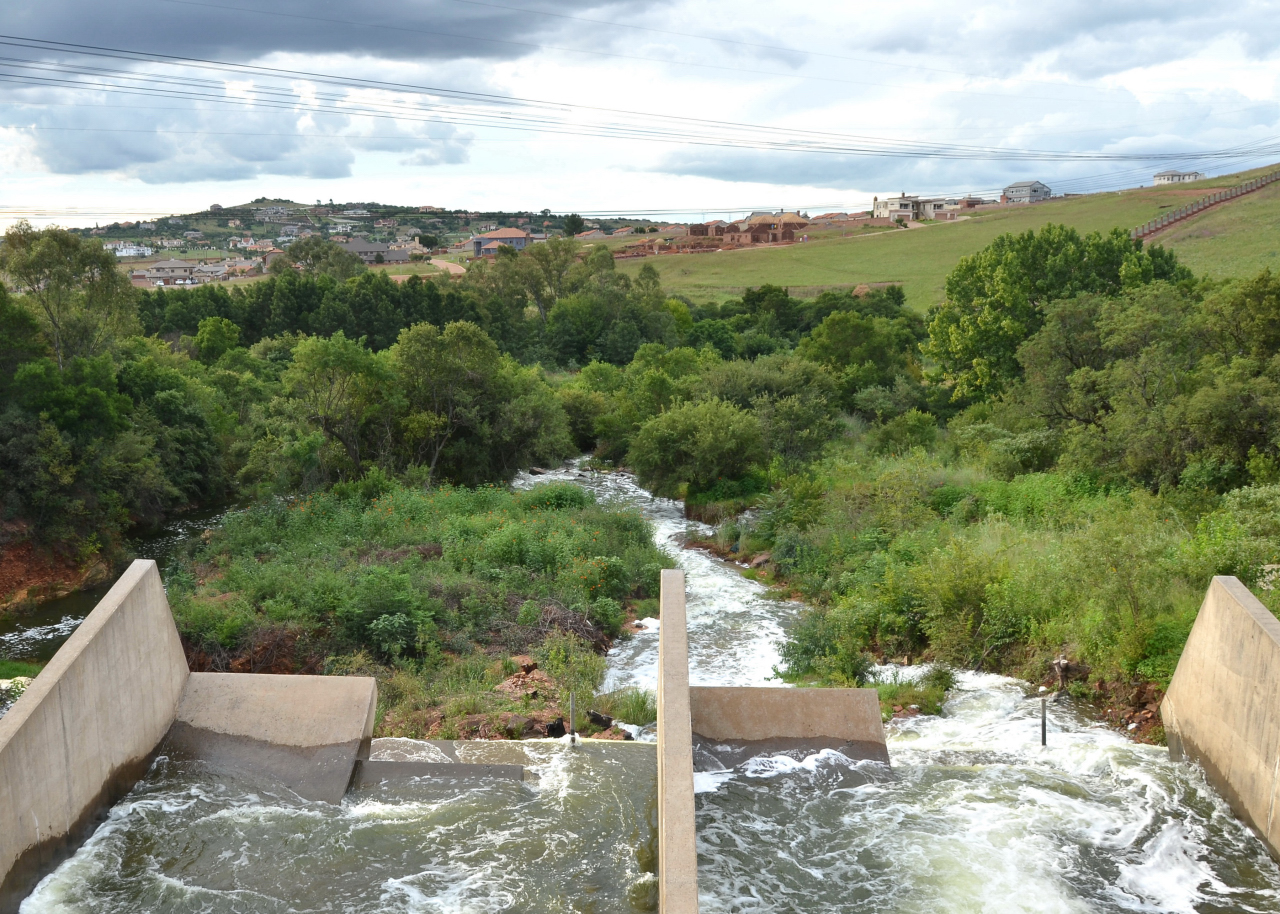
Water released from the dam into Sesmylspruit
