= Rietvlei Dam =

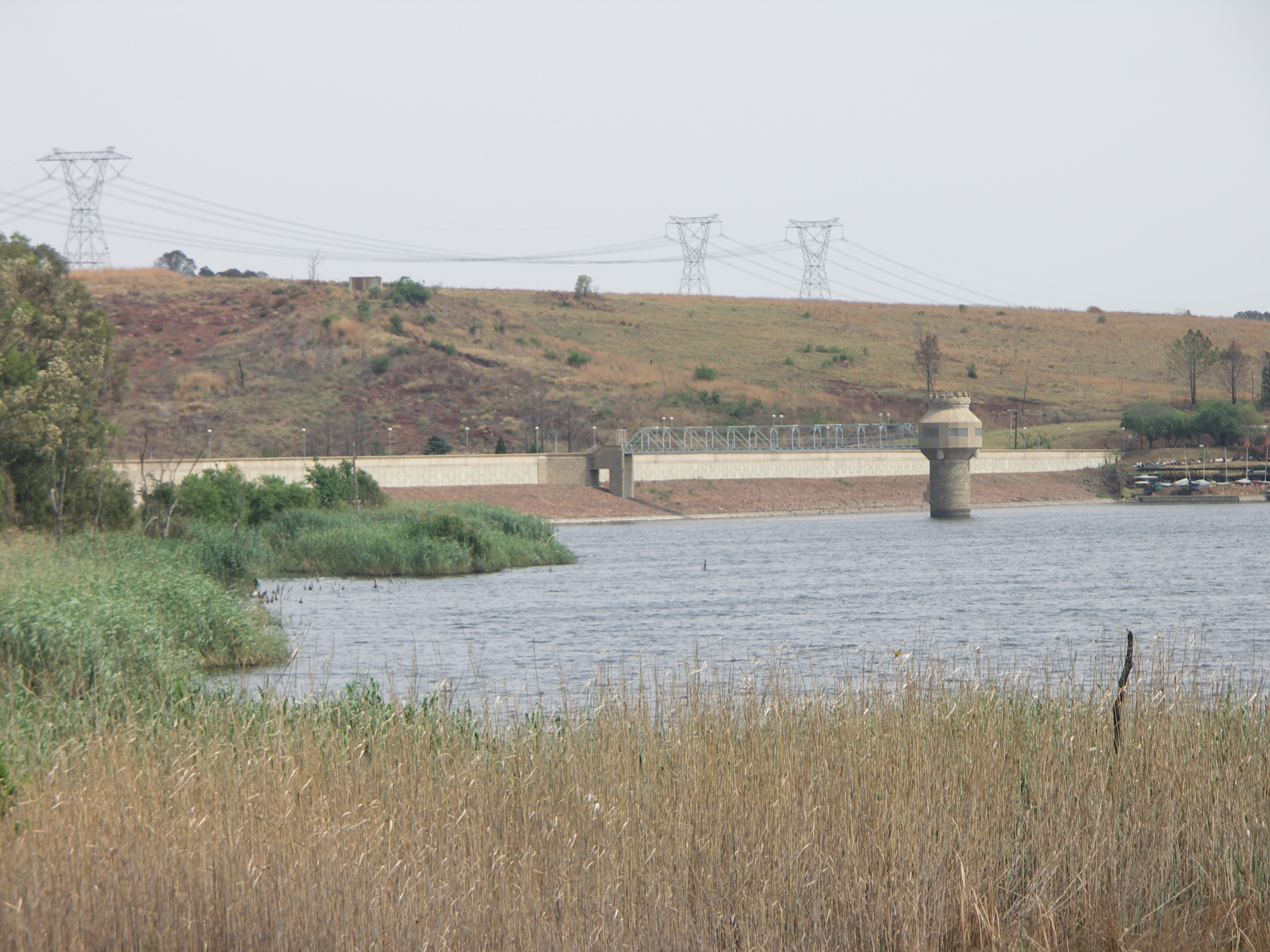

- Location within South Africa
- Official name: Rietvlei Dam
- Country: South Africa
- Location: Pretoria, Gauteng
- Coordinates: 25.8767°S 28.2658°E
- Construction began: 1932
- Opening date: 1934
- Owner: City of Tshwane

Dam and spillways
- Type of dam: earth-fill
- Impounds: Rietvlei River
- Height: 32 m
- Length: 350 m (1,150 ft)

Reservoir
- Creates: Rietvlei Dam Reservoir
- Total capacity: 12 377 m^{3}
- Catchment area: 0.4 km^{2}
- Surface area: 1.89 square kilometres (189 ha)

The Rietvlei dam is an earth-fill type dam and is one of a number of dams supplying water to the Pretoria region of South Africa. It supplies around 41 million liters of drinking water daily, about 5.9% of the water requirement of Pretoria. The dam mainly serves for municipal and industrial use. Its hazard potential has been ranked high (3).

Constructed as an earth-fill dam wall with a brick core in 1932/4, it was extended between 1988 and 1990 by raising the dam wall with the addition of a concrete wave wall and a reinforced earth barrier wall, as well as a surfaced roadway, on top of the original wall.

The dam is fed by the Rietvlei, a river of the Crocodile River (Limpopo) basin, as well as by five fountains and five boreholes.

The Rietvlei Nature Reserve occupies the area immediately surrounding the dam.

== See also ==
- Rietvlei Nature Reserve
