= Spartan, Kempton Park =

Spartan
- Location within Gauteng Location within South Africa
- Coordinates: 26°6′58″S 28°12′57″E
- Country: South Africa
- Province: Gauteng
- Municipality: Ekurhuleni
- Main Place: Kempton Park

Area
  - Total: 3.77 km^{2} (1.46 sq mi)

Population (2011)
  - Total: 236
  - Density: 62.6/km^{2} (162/sq mi)

Racial makeup (2011)
  - Black African: 88.1%
  - Coloured: 0.4%
  - Indian/Asian: 1.7%
  - White: 9.8%

First languages (2011)
  - Zulu: 24.2%
  - Northern Sotho: 17.8%
  - Ndebele: 12.7%
  - Afrikaans: 8.9%
  - Other: 36.4%
- Time zone: UTC+2 (SAST)
- Postal code (street): 1619
- PO box: --
- Area code: 011

Spartan is an industrial suburb of Kempton Park, in Gauteng province, South Africa. Many industries that deal with paint, automotive and general light machining have their operations here. The area's census figure is very low, only 236, as this accounts for mainly night security staff that sleep on their firms' property.
