= Birchleigh North =

- Location within Gauteng Location within South Africa
- Coordinates: 26.0424°S 28.2322°E
- Country: South Africa
- Province: Gauteng
- Municipality: Ekurhuleni
- Main Place: Kempton Park

Area
  - Total: 2.92 km^{2} (1.13 sq mi)

Population (2011)
  - Total: 7,998
  - Density: 2,740/km^{2} (7,090/sq mi)

Racial makeup (2011)
  - Black African: 54.40%
  - White: 40.41%
  - Indian/Asian: 2.76%
  - Coloured: 1.66%
  - Other: 0.74%

First languages (2011)
  - Afrikaans: 31.90%
  - English: 23.04%
  - Zulu: 11.77%
  - Northern Sotho: 8.55%
  - Sotho: 6.01%
- Time zone: UTC+2 (SAST)

Birchleigh North is the northernmost suburb of Kempton Park, in Gauteng province, South Africa.
