= Erasmus Castle =

Mansion in South Africa

Erasmus Castle Erasmuskasteel
- "Die f Spookhuis"
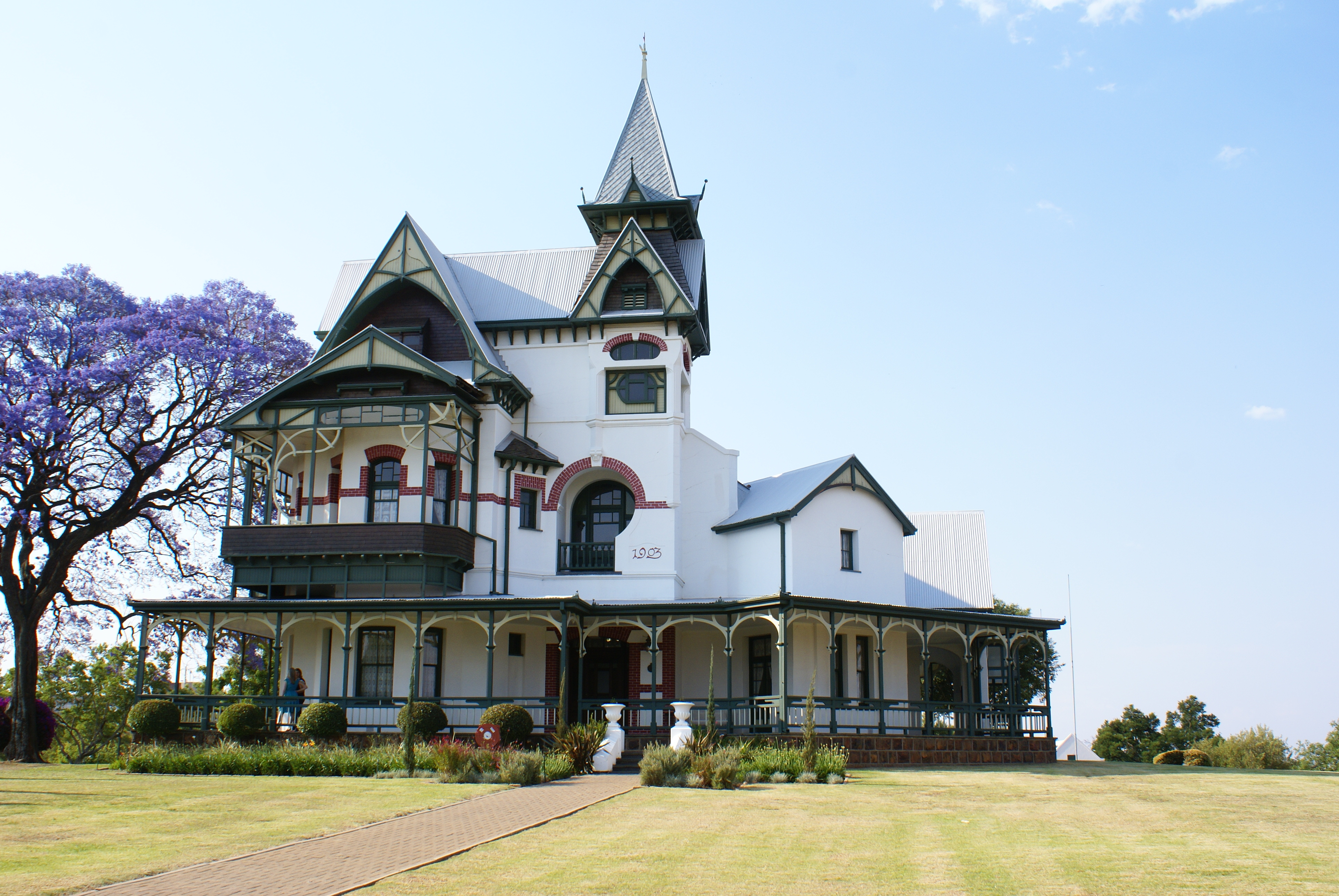
- The mansion in Erasmuskloof, Pretoria

- Location within South Africa

General information
- Type: Mansion/Manor House/Castle
- Architectural style: Victorian Art Nouveau
- Location: Erasmuskloof, Pretoria, South Africa
- Coordinates: 25°48′56″S 28°15′43″E
- Construction started: 1892
- Completed: 1903
- Renovated: 1989
- Cost: £7,500 (in 1892)
- Owner: Armscor

Height
- Top floor: Tower

Technical details
- Floor count: 3 excluding tower

Design and construction
- Architect: Van der Benn (assistant: St Clair)
- Main contractor: Monte Bello
- Known for: Tourism Destination, Haunted House

Website
- www.armscor.co.za/Default.asp

Erasmus Castle (Erasmuskasteel in Afrikaans), also known as "Die Spookhuis" or "The Haunted House", is an imposing mansion situated on a hill in the Erasmuskloof suburb of Pretoria, South Africa. Originally owned by George Dean Erasmus, it is a unique landmark in the city and rumours of ghosts and supernatural encounters in and around the residence are plentiful. Though the house and its grounds are privately owned by Armscor, public tours or cultural gatherings at the premises can be arranged. The mansion is said to be haunted, and paranormal activity is claimed to include lit windows in the uninhabited mansion, encounters with Dean Erasmus, and hearing disturbing moans at night.

== 19th and 20th centuries ==
Construction began in 1892 and it was completed in 1903 and owned by George Dean Erasmus. Early in the 20th century, the house had however fallen into disrepair and ruin. In the late 1960s, the Erasmus heirs were compelled to sell the farm "Garsfontein" to the Pretoria Municipality as new highways were being developed east of the city. These plans fell through and in 1975 Armscor acquired the property for the development of their new headquarters. In 1975 the board instructed Billy Nel, assisted by Dr Elise Labuschagne, Hannes Meiring and Anton Janson to restore the mansion to its original form. The two original farmhouses on the farm were moved closer to the mansion in order to clear space for the construction of Armscor's new headquarters. They were demolished stone by stone and then carefully re-erected closer to the castle, the vandalised Erasmus family cemetery was moved into the old cattle kraal area. In 1989 the construction firm A J Konstruksie (Edms) Bpk were contracted to make urgent restorations.

== 21st century ==
The mansion continues to sprout new and exciting tales and remains popular with ghost hunters and historical societies to this day.

== Historical importance ==
In a cave on the property, several pre-colonial artefacts were discovered. Chief amongst these were San artefacts dating from over 150,000 years ago, turquoise beads dating back to the traders from ancient Phoenicia. The site also contains a preserved early Voortrekker period home with a historically accurate cow dung floor.

== See also ==
- List of reportedly haunted locations
- Haunted House
- Ghost
- List of Castles and Fortifications in South Africa
