= Birch Acres =

- Location within Gauteng Location within South Africa
- Coordinates: 26.0540°S 28.2030°E
- Country: South Africa
- Province: Gauteng
- Municipality: Ekurhuleni
- Main Place: Kempton Park

Area
  - Total: 2.23 km^{2} (0.86 sq mi)

Population (2011)
  - Total: 6,732
  - Density: 3,020/km^{2} (7,820/sq mi)

Racial makeup (2011)
  - White: 49.31%
  - Black African: 41.30%
  - Indian/Asian: 5.32%
  - Coloured: 3.55%
  - Other: 0.52%

First languages (2011)
  - Afrikaans: 36.34%
  - English: 30.01%
  - Zulu: 8.85%
  - Northern Sotho: 6.04%
  - Sotho: 4.68%
- Time zone: UTC+2 (SAST)

Birch Acres is a suburb of Kempton Park, in Gauteng province, South Africa.
