= Norkem Park =

- Location within Gauteng Location within South Africa Location within Africa
- Coordinates: 26°3′S 28°13′E
- Country: South Africa
- Province: Gauteng
- Municipality: Ekurhuleni
- Main Place: Kempton Park

Area
  - Total: 4.27 km^{2} (1.65 sq mi)

Population (2011)
  - Total: 12,229
  - Density: 2,860/km^{2} (7,420/sq mi)

Racial makeup (2011)
  - Black African: 59.0%
  - Coloured: 2.3%
  - Indian/Asian: 3.7%
  - White: 34.6%
  - Other: 0.3%

First languages (2011)
  - Afrikaans: 25.3%
  - English: 23.5%
  - Zulu: 13.4%
  - Northern Sotho: 10.9%
  - Other: 27.4%
- Time zone: UTC+2 (SAST)
- Postal code (street): 1618
- PO box: 1631

Norkem Park is a suburb in northern Kempton Park, in Gauteng province, South Africa.
