= Edleen =

- Location within Gauteng Location within South Africa
- Coordinates: 26.093°S 28.206°E
- Country: South Africa
- Province: Gauteng
- Municipality: Ekurhuleni
- Main Place: Kempton Park

Area
  - Total: 1.82 km^{2} (0.70 sq mi)

Population (2011)
  - Total: 4,798
  - Density: 2,640/km^{2} (6,830/sq mi)

Racial makeup (2011)
  - Black African: 29.1%
  - Coloured: 2.9%
  - Indian/Asian: 4.4%
  - White: 62.4%
  - Other: 1.2%

First languages (2011)
  - Afrikaans: 46.7%
  - English: 35.0%
  - Zulu: 4.7%
  - Northern Sotho: 3.8%
  - Other: 9.8%
- Time zone: UTC+2 (SAST)
- Postal code (street): 1619
- PO box: 1625

Edleen is a suburb in western Kempton Park, in Gauteng province, South Africa.

== History ==
The suburb lies on part of an old Witwatersrand farm called Zuurfontein. It was named after the owners Edward and Eileen Vermaak. The original homestead was situated on stands 220, 221, 222, 223 and 224 situated between Green avenue, Ilex Avenue and Hawthorne Avenue. In the early 1960s this property was sold to Alec Louw and Eddy and Eileen Vermaak relocated to 36 Okkerneut avenue. This property was also purchased by Alec Louw about two years later and they then relocated to a plot in Pomona. The first six houses built in Edleen was Okkerneut Avenue 36, 32, 28 and 26 and two houses opposite the road from 36.
