= Van Riebeeck Park =

- Location within Gauteng Location within South Africa
- Coordinates: 26.078°S 28.217°E
- Country: South Africa
- Province: Gauteng
- Municipality: Ekurhuleni
- Main Place: Kempton Park
- Established: 1952

Area
  - Total: 3.90 km^{2} (1.51 sq mi)

Population (2011)
  - Total: 7,431
  - Density: 1,910/km^{2} (4,930/sq mi)

Racial makeup (2011)
  - Black African: 17.3%
  - Coloured: 1.1%
  - Indian/Asian: 2.1%
  - White: 78.1%
  - Other: 1.3%

First languages (2011)
  - Afrikaans: 56.1%
  - English: 30.6%
  - Zulu: 3.3%
  - Northern Sotho: 2.6%
  - Other: 7.4%
- Time zone: UTC+2 (SAST)
- Postal code (street): 1619
- PO box: 1629

Van Riebeeck Park is a residential suburb of Kempton Park, Gauteng, South Africa.

== History ==
Named in 1952, it obtained its name after the tercentennial anniversary of the landing of Jan van Riebeeck.

== Education ==
It has a high school named Jeugland Hoërskool and a primary school named Laerskool Van Riebeeckpark, just a few kilometers apart.
