= Terenure, Kempton Park =

Terenure
- Location within Gauteng Location within South Africa
- Coordinates: 26°05′00″S 28°11′47″E
- Country: South Africa
- Province: Gauteng
- Municipality: Ekurhuleni
- Main Place: Kempton Park

Area
  - Total: 3.05 km^{2} (1.18 sq mi)

Population (2011)
  - Total: 10,723
  - Density: 3,520/km^{2} (9,110/sq mi)

Racial makeup (2011)
  - White: 45.3%
  - Black African: 44.6%
  - Indian/Asian: 6.2%
  - Coloured: 3.2%
  - Other: 0.7%

First languages (2011)
  - English: 30.5%
  - Afrikaans: 29.6%
  - Sotho: 13.5%
  - Zulu: 8.6%
  - Other: 17.8%
- Time zone: UTC+2 (SAST)

Terenure is a suburb of Kempton Park, in Gauteng province, South Africa. According to the 2011 census, Terenure and Terenure Extension had a population of 4,144 and 6,579 respectively.
