= Kempton Park, Gauteng =

City in Gauteng, South Africa

Kempton Park
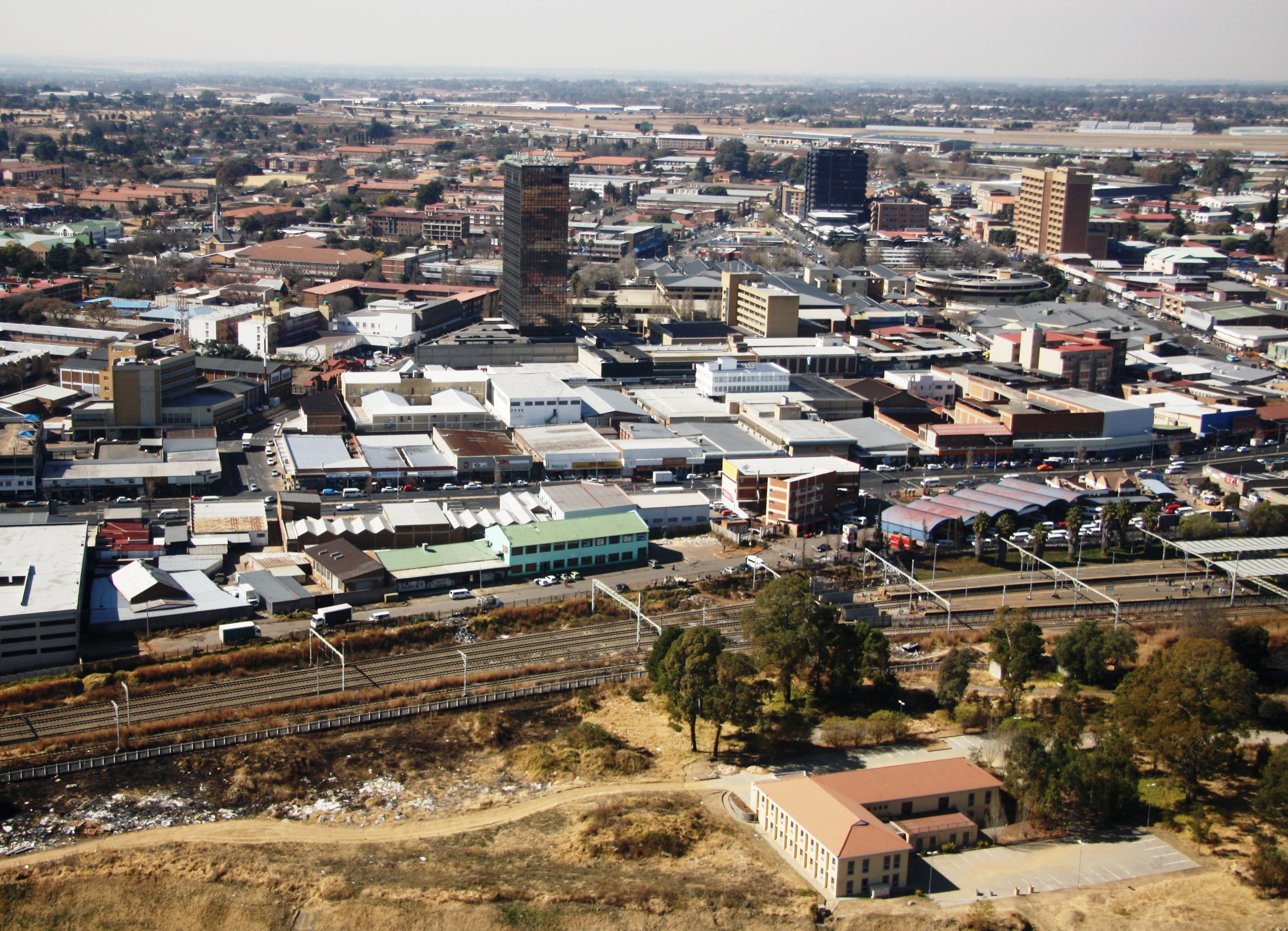
- The Central Business District of Kempton Park

- Location within Gauteng Location within South Africa Location within Africa
- Coordinates: 26°6′S 28°14′E
- Country: South Africa
- Province: Gauteng
- Municipality: Ekurhuleni
- Established: 1903

Area
  - Total: 149.05 km^{2} (57.55 sq mi)

Population (2011)
  - Total: 171,575
  - Density: 1,151.1/km^{2} (2,981.4/sq mi)

Racial makeup (2011)
  - Black African: 46.6%
  - Coloured: 2.3%
  - Indian/Asian: 3.3%
  - White: 46.9%
  - Other: 0.9%

First languages (2011)
  - Afrikaans: 35.0%
  - English: 26.2%
  - Zulu: 8.6%
  - Northern Sotho: 7.8%
  - Other: 22.4%
- Time zone: UTC+2 (SAST)
- Postal code (street): 1619
- PO box: 1620
- Area code: 010

Kempton Park is a city in the East Rand region of Gauteng province, South Africa. It is part of the City of Ekurhuleni Metropolitan Municipality. It is situated south of Thembisa, one of the largest townships in South Africa, which is also part of Ekurhuleni. South Africa's busiest airport, O. R. Tambo International Airport is located in Kempton Park.

The name of the city is sometimes written as "Kemptonpark" in Afrikaans.

== History ==
Kempton Park lies on what were two Boer farms in the South African Republic (ZAR). The first farm was Zuurfontein No 369 with the title deed issued to Johannes Stephanus Marais on 25 October 1859 and surveyed to be 3000 morgen on 12 December 1859. The second farm northwest of the first was registered to Cornelius Johannes Beukes in March 1865 and was called Rietfontein 32 IR.

After the discovery of gold in Johannesburg, 22 kilometres (14 mi) southwest of the farms in 1886, a railway connecting Pretoria to Vereeniging and to the Cape line was constructed in the early 1890s. The railway line did not go through Johannesburg, but passed to the east through the two farms with a station called Zuurfontein, which would be linked by a side-rail to the Zuid-Afrikaansche Fabrieken voor Ontplofbare Stoffen, a dynamite factory a few kilometres north west.

The city was established on 24 August 1903 when Karl Friedrich Wolff sub-divided a portion of his Zuurfontein farm into 216 residential stands and named the new town Kempten after the German town in Bavaria of his birth. The name was anglicised into Kempton Park.

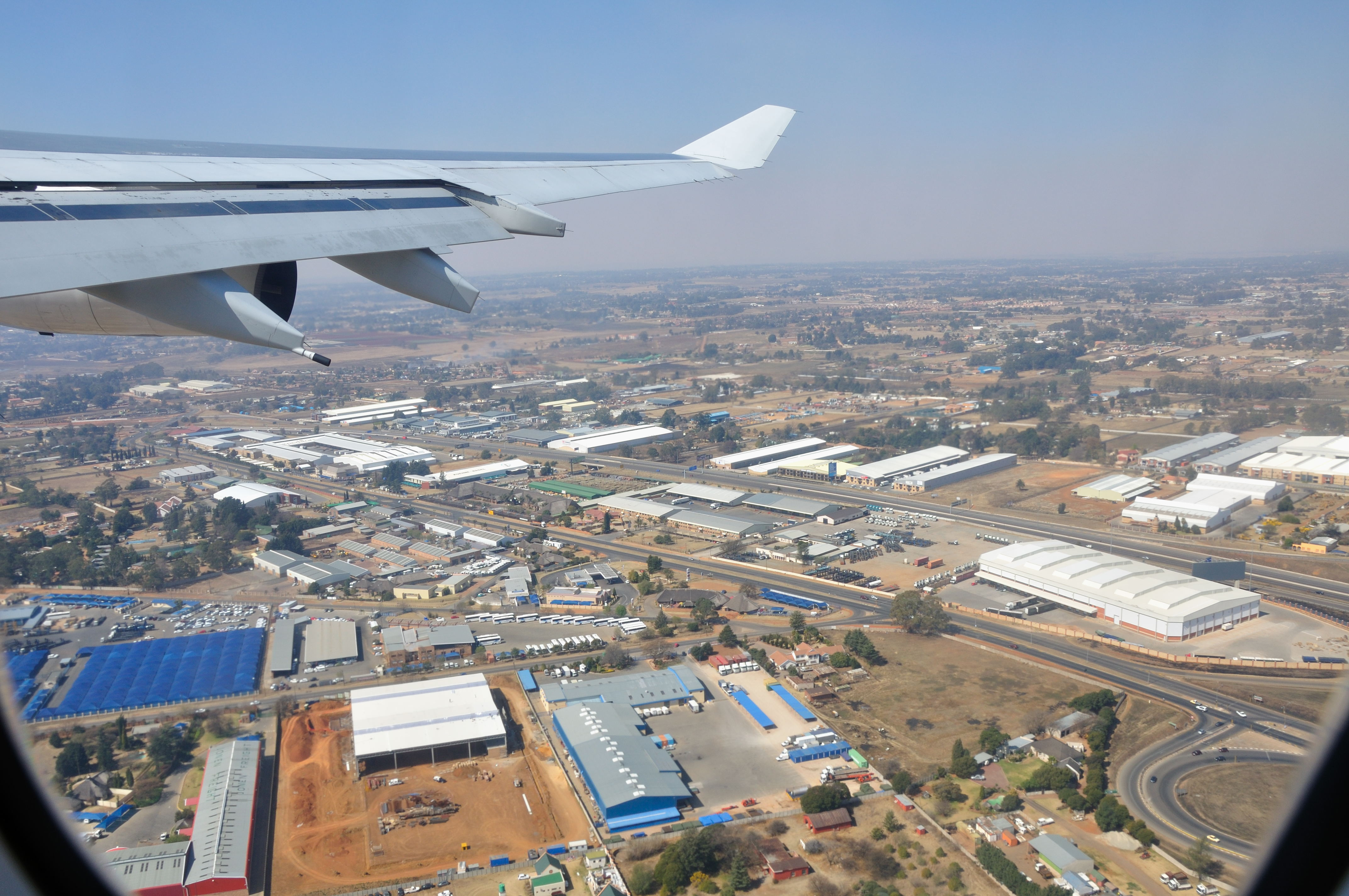
Kempton Park after takeoff from OR Tambo International Airport

O. R. Tambo International Airport (Africa's busiest airport) is located in Kempton Park. In 1952, the airport, then known as Jan Smuts International Airport, was built on land next to the community, and opened in 1953. The airport's name was changed to Johannesburg International Airport in the late 1990s and then to OR Tambo International Airport in 2006. Kempton Park has been part of the City of Ekurhuleni Metropolitan Municipality since 2000.

=== Storming of the Kempton Park World Trade Centre ===
The storming of Kempton Park World Trade Centre took place on 25 June 1993 when approximately three thousand members of the Afrikaner Volksfront (AVF), Afrikaner Weerstandsbeweging (AWB) and other paramilitary White Nationalist Afrikaner groups stormed the World Trade Centre in Kempton Park. At the time of the attack, the World Trade Centre was the venue for multi-party CODESA negotiations to end the apartheid system through the country's first multi-racial elections. These negotiations were strongly opposed by some White groups in South Africa.

== Geography ==
Kempton Park lies in the westernmost part of the East Rand and the City of Ekurhuleni, bordering with the City of Johannesburg to the west. The city is positioned on the urban fringe of the Greater Johannesburg metropolitan area abutting semi-rural smallholdings and the rural countryside to its north-east.

As a result of its integration into the conurbation, the boundaries of Kempton Park are now contiguous with Thembisa to the north, Boksburg to the south, Midrand to the north-west, Germiston and Edenvale to the south-west, Benoni to the east and Modderfontein to the west.

=== Communities ===
Kempton Park was declared a city in 1992 and has the following suburbs:

- Allen Grove
- Aston Manor
- Birch Acres
- Birchleigh
- Birchleigh North
- Bonaero Park
- Bredell
- Cresslawn
- Croydon
- Edleen
- Esther Park
- Glen Marais
- Isando
- Kempton Park West
- Nimrod Park
- Norkem Park
- Pomona
- Rhodesfield
- Spartan
- Terenure
- Van Riebeeck Park

== Demographics ==
In the census of 2011, the population of Kempton Park consisted of 171,575 people living in 53,777 households. 47% of the people described themselves as "White", 46% as "Black African" and 2% as "Coloured". 35% spoke Afrikaans as their first language and 26% spoke English.

== Economy ==
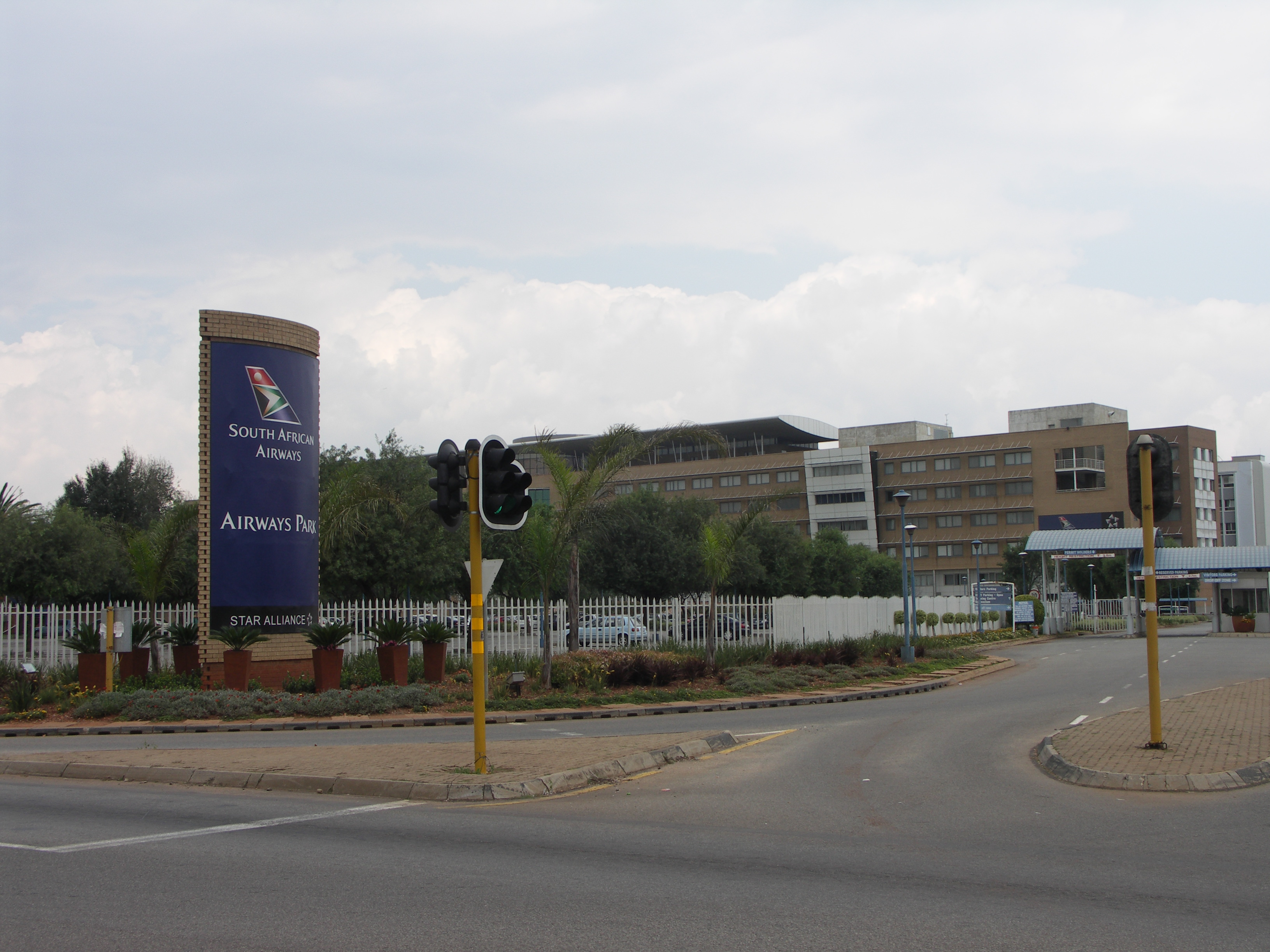
Airways Park, the head office of South African Airways

Spartan is a large industrial zone which houses many chemical manufacturing and other industrial sites. North-west of Kempton Park lies the heavy industry suburb of Modderfontein with one of the main companies there, the AECI Dynamite factory. Kempton Park also has a large coal power station named Kelvin power station which supplies power to the City of Johannesburg. The Emperor's Palace Casino is also located in Kempton Park, just south of the airport.

The international airport plays a dominant role in the local economy. Several airline and other aviation related companies are headquartered in Kempton Park. South African Airways, the flag carrier of South Africa, and subsidiary South African Express have their head offices in Kempton Park. Mango, a low cost airline, is headquartered on the grounds of OR Tambo. Federal Air has its headquarters on the OR Tambo grounds. 1time had its head office in the Isando Industrial Park. Safair's head office is in Kempton Park.

== Education ==
The city has ten major schools:

- Hoërskool Jeugland, Hoërskool Kempton Park, Rhodesfield High School, Hoërskool Birchleigh, Norkem Park High, Sir Pierre van Ryneveld, Shangri-La Academy, Sonrise Christian School, Cresslawn Primary School, and Maranatha Christian School.

== Sport and recreation ==
The Kempton Park Golf Course, first designed in 1965, in Spartan, is known as the club where Ernie Els learnt how to play golf.

== Transportation ==
=== Gautrain ===
The suburb of Rhodesfield just south of the city centre has got a station on the Gautrain rail, named the Rhodesfield station.

The O. R. Tambo International Airport has the eastern terminus of the Gautrain rail at the OR Tambo station.

The highspeed Gautrain Rail links the airport as well as Rhodesfield with the Sandton station in the west. This section from OR Tambo to Sandton opened on 8 June 2010, in time for the 2010 FIFA World Cup.

From Sandton, the railway connects either north to Midrand, Centurion and Pretoria or south to Rosebank and Johannesburg.

=== Road ===
The R21 is the major freeway that runs through Kempton Park. It enters the city from Boksburg in the south, bypassing the O.R. Tambo International Airport and Kempton Park CBD before heading north towards Pretoria. There are 2 offramps into Kempton Park being Voortrekker Road / Air Freight and Pomona Road which gives closer access to the Glen Marais and Bonaero Park suburbs. The R24 (Albertina Sisulu Freeway) is a freeway in the south of the city starting at an interchange with the R21 at the O.R. Tambo International Airport, and continues south-west towards Edenvale and Johannesburg. The R25 crosses Kempton Park’s northern suburbs from north-east to south-west linking the city with Bapsfontein and Bronkhorstspruit to the north-east and Johannesburg to the south-west.

Kempton Park is also served by a number of metropolitan routes linking it to surrounding towns and cities in the East Rand (City of Ekurhuleni). The M16 links Kempton Park with Edenvale to the south-west. The M32 links Kempton Park with Benoni to the east. The M43 links Kempton Park with Boksburg to the south. The M45 links Kempton Park with Benoni to the east. The M57 links Kempton Park with Thembisa and Olifantsfontein to the north, Boksburg to the south and Germiston to the south-west. The M59 passes in-between Kempton Park and Edenvale. The M99 links Kempton Park with Bedfordview and Germiston to the south-west.

The M39 connects Kempton Park with Midrand to the north-west and Germiston to the south. Kempton Park is also served internally by metropolitan routes including the M84, M88, M89, M90, M91, M92 and M96.

== Notable people ==
André Stander was a police officer in Kempton Park CID from 1963 to 1980, before being jailed for bank robberies.
