= N4 (South Africa) =

National road in South Africa

National route N4

Route information
- Maintained by SANRAL, Bakwena and TRAC
- Length: 718 km (446 mi)

Major junctions
- West end: A2 A2 at the Botswana border near Lobatse
- N1 in Pretoria; N12 in eMalahleni; N11 near Middelburg
- East end: EN4 EN4 at the Mozambican border near Ressano Garcia

Location
- Country: South Africa
- Provinces: North West; Gauteng; Mpumalanga
- Major cities: Zeerust; Rustenburg; Brits; Pretoria; Bronkhorstspruit; eMalahleni; Middelburg; Mbombela; Malelane; Komatipoort

Highway system
- Numbered routes of South Africa
← N3	→ N5

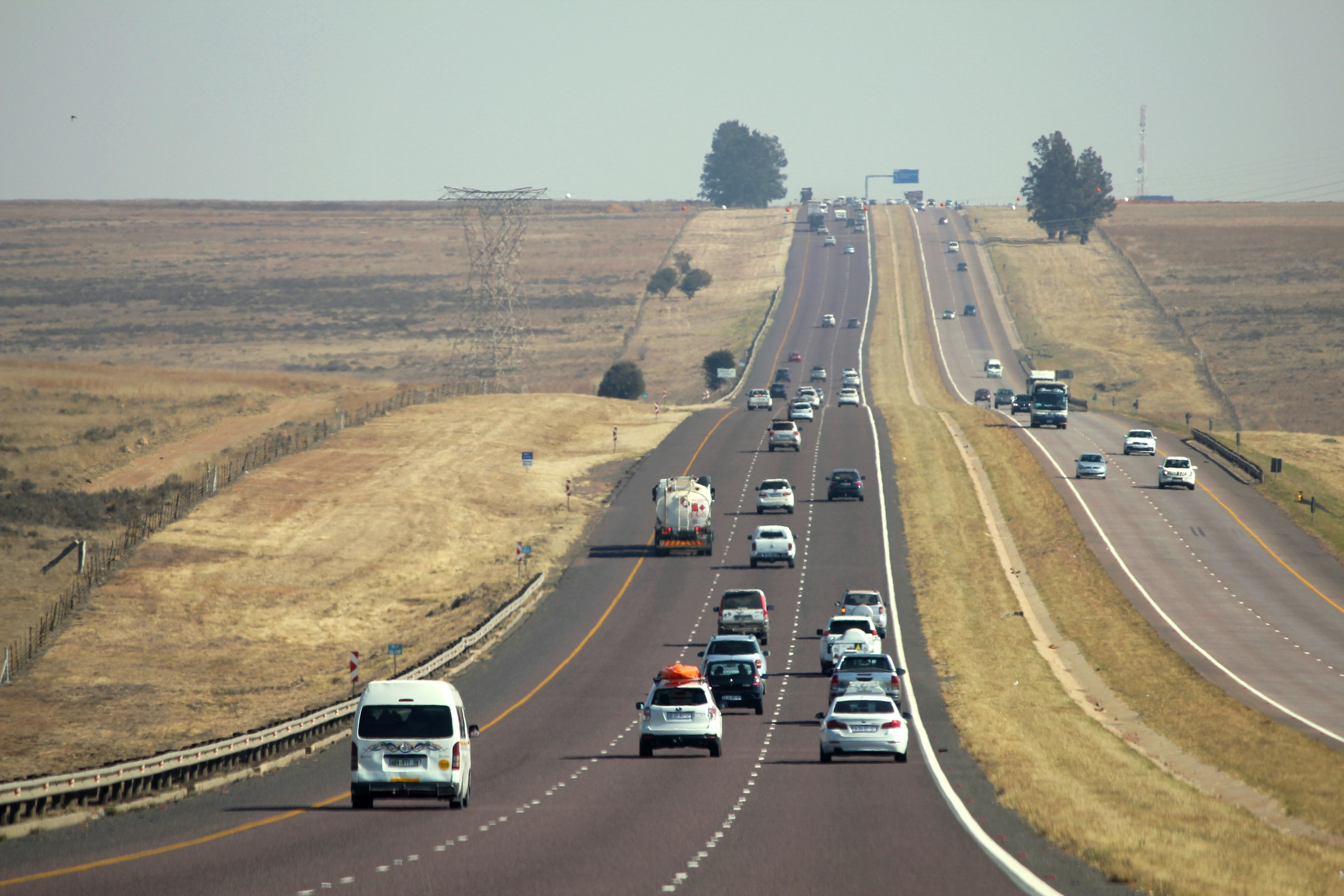
The N4 road westbound near Middelburg, Mpumalanga

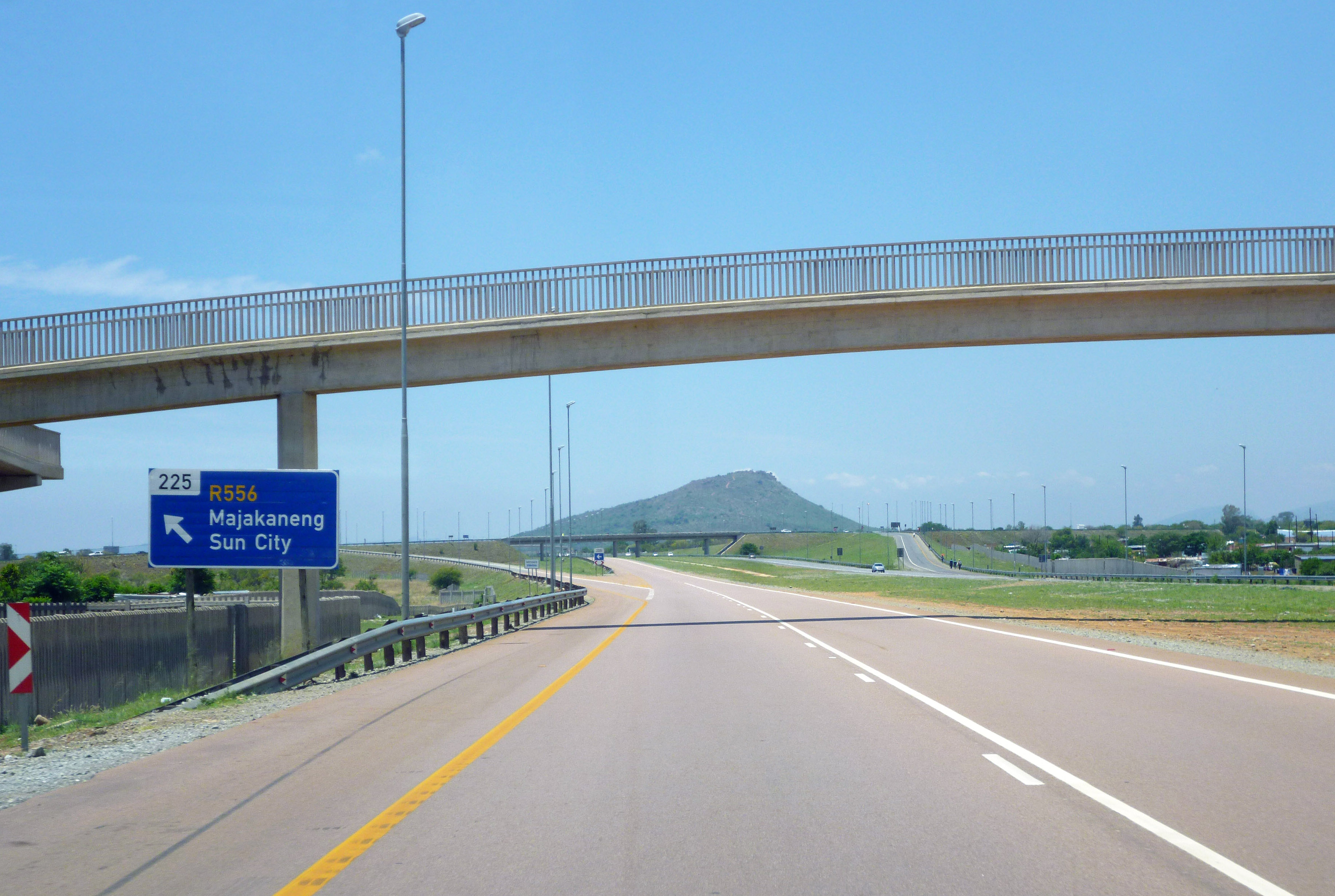
The N4 road eastbound at the interchange with the R556 road near Modderspruit in North West.

The N4 is a national route in South Africa that runs from Skilpadshek on the Botswana border, past Rustenburg, Pretoria, eMalahleni and Mbombela, to Komatipoort on the Mozambique border. The entire route is a toll road.

The N4 west of Pretoria, named the Platinum Highway, forms the South African section of the Trans-Kalahari Corridor, which runs from Walvis Bay to Pretoria, while the N4 east of Pretoria forms the Maputo Corridor, which runs from Pretoria to Maputo. Together, they link the east and west coasts of Southern Africa.

The eastern section from Pretoria to Wonderfontein (a distance of 168 km) is a four to six-lane dual-carriageway tolled freeway opened in 1968, with toll gates at Donkerhoek (Diamond Hill) and just west of Middelburg. The freeway from eMalahleni to Middelburg was one of the first concrete freeways built in South Africa and the Ultra City station on this section was the first service station built on the sides of a freeway. At eMalahleni (formerly Witbank), the freeway converges with the N12 from Johannesburg. An alternative route to the N4, known as the R104, runs between Pretoria and Wonderfontein (east of Middelburg). Between eMalahleni and Middelburg the alternative is the R555. After Wonderfontein the toll road runs along the old alignment of the N4 until the Lebombo Border Post. From Wonderfontein to eNtokozweni (formerly Machadodorp) the N4 is a single-carriageway highway with two lanes in both directions; thereafter, the N4 is a wide shouldered single-carriageway highway. The section east of Middelburg has been significantly improved, including a northern bypass of Mbombela, and now features some new grade-separated junctions.

== Route ==
Detailed Route

=== North West ===
The entire section of the N4 in the North-West Province is known as the Platinum Highway and is part of the Trans-Kalahari Corridor.

The N4 route begins at the Skilpadshek Border Post with Botswana, where it is designated as the A2 road on the Botswana side towards Lobatse. The border post on the Botswana side is known as Pioneer Gate. The N4 route begins by going south-east for 50 kilometres, through Dinokana and bypassing Lehurutshe, to reach a junction with the R49.

The N4 and the R49 are cosigned north-east as one road into the CBD of the town of Zeerust. Just before Zeerust Shopping Centre, the R49 becomes its own road northwards towards the Kopfontein (Tlokweng) border with Botswana, leaving the N4 as the main road through Zeerust eastwards (Church Street). The N4 proceeds eastwards for 67 kilometres, passing Groot Marico and the river of the same name, through the Swartruggens Toll Plaza, to the town of Swartruggens, where it passes through the central part of the town as Andries Pretorius Street and meets the northern terminus of the R53 and R509 roads.

From the junction with the R509, the N4 goes eastwards for 45 kilometres, through Moedwil, to reach the town of Rustenburg. Just before Rustenburg, the N4 meets the north-eastern terminus of the R52 road. Just west of Rustenburg, the N4 meets the R104 (eastbound off-ramp only), which is a road that is an alternative to the N4 and is sometimes designated to roads that were previously part of the N4.

As the R104 provides access to the Rustenburg Central Business District, the N4 turns south-east and bypasses the city centre to the south as a two-lane single carriageway freeway. Adjacent to the Waterfall Mall of Rustenburg, the N4 meets the R24 road, which provides access to the cities of Magaliesburg, Krugersdorp and Johannesburg in the south-east. From the R24 interchange, the N4 continues east-south-east for 6 kilometres to the town of Kroondal, where it meets the R104 road again.

From Kroondal, the N4 continues eastwards for 36 kilometres, encountering the Marikana Toll Plaza and becoming a four-lane dual carriageway, bypassing Mooinooi, to reach the town of Modderspruit (Bapong), where it meets the R556 road which provides access to the resort of Sun City next to the Pilanesberg. It proceeds eastwards for 8 kilometres to reach an interchange with the R512 road, which provides access to the city of Brits in the north and the city of Randburg (part of Johannesburg) via the western side of the Hartbeespoort Dam in the south.

The N4 proceeds eastwards for 7 kilometres to reach an interchange with the R511 road, which provides access to the cities of Brits and Thabazimbi in the north and the city of Sandton (part of Johannesburg) via Hartbeespoort central to the south. The N4 proceeds eastwards for 13 kilometres to encounter the Brits Toll Plaza and cross into the Gauteng Province just south of Ga-Rankuwa.

=== Gauteng ===
The N4 enters the City of Tshwane and becomes the northern section of the Pretoria Bypass.

From the Gauteng Province border, the N4 proceeds eastwards for 16 kilometres to reach an interchange with the R80 highway (Mabopane Highway), which connects Mabopane and Soshanguve in the north with Pretoria in the south. The N4 proceeds eastwards for 10 kilometres to meet the R566, which provides access to the Annlin Suburb and to Wonderboom Airport. The N4 continues for another 12 kilometres eastwards to pass through the Doornpoort Toll Plaza and reach an interchange with the N1 highway south of the N1's Pumulani Toll Plaza.

From this interchange, the N1 and the N4 are cosigned southwards on the eastern section of the Pretoria Bypass for 12 kilometres, bypassing Montana Park, up to the Proefplaas Interchange, where the road westwards from this interchange is Pretoria's M2 metropolitan route proceeding into the Pretoria CBD and the road eastwards is the N4 proceeding towards Mpumalanga Province while the Pretoria Eastern Bypass remains designated as the N1 southwards towards Johannesburg. The Proefplaas Interchange, where the N4 leaves the Pretoria Eastern Bypass, marks the end of the N4 being known as the Platinum Highway. It also marks the end of the Trans-Kalahari Corridor. (The N4 now continues eastwards as part of the Maputo Corridor)

From the Proefplaas Interchange, the N4 goes eastwards for 48 kilometres, meeting the R515 road & encountering a toll gate at Donkerhoek (Diamond Hill Toll Plaza), to reach the town of Bronkhorstspruit, where it meets the R25 road. The N4 proceeds eastwards for 25 kilometres to leave the City of Tshwane Metropolitan Municipality and reach the town of Balmoral in Mpumalanga Province, where it meets the northern terminus of the R545 road.

=== Mpumalanga ===
From Balmoral, the N4 proceeds eastwards for 25 kilometres to enter Witbank (eMalahleni). After the interchange with the R555 and R544 routes south of the eMalahleni city centre, the N4 continues eastwards, meeting the eastern end of the N12 national route from Johannesburg (westbound only), to bypass Middelburg to the south (where a tollgate is located just before the first Middelburg off-ramp), with the R575 and the R35 roads providing access to the city centre. South-east of Middelburg, the N4 meets the N11 national route, which provides access to Middelburg Central in the north and to Ermelo in the south.

From the N11 off-ramp, the N4 goes eastwards for 57 kilometres to meet the R33 road, which provides access to the town of Belfast (eMakhazeni) just to the north. At 264 km long, the section of the N4 from the Marikana Toll Plaza to Wonderfontein (just before eMakhazeni) is the second longest stretch of dual-carriageway freeway in South Africa (after the 265 km dual-carriageway freeway section of the N1 between the Vaal Toll Plaza and Modimolle). From eMakhazeni, the N4 continues eastwards for 22 kilometres to Machadodorp (eNtokozweni), where it meets the R36 route and crosses the Elands River. The R36 joins the N4 and they are cosigned north-east for 8 kilometres, with the Machado Toll Plaza on this stretch, before the R36 becomes its own road northwards. The N4 continues eastwards for 100 kilometres, through Waterval Boven (Emgwenya; where there is a short tunnel), Waterval Onder, Ngodwana and Alkmaar, to enter the city of Nelspruit (Mbombela). It is followed by the Crocodile River from the R539 (Schoemanskloof Pass) junction about 16 kilometres after Ngodwana.

As the old road through Nelspruit Central is designated as the R104 (Samora Machel Drive), the N4 bypasses the city to the north on a newer highway (opened on 13 June 2010), crossing to the northern side of the parallel Crocodile River, passing by Riverside (where it meets the R37) and through the Lowveld National Botanical Garden, before joining the old alignment east of the city and crossing back to the south of the Crocodile River. From Mbombela, the N4 continues eastwards for 100 kilometres, following the Crocodile River (which makes up the entire southern border of the Kruger National Park), meeting the north-eastern terminus of the R38 road at Kaapmuiden and passing by the Nkomazi Toll Plaza just east of Kaapmuiden, through Malalane, to reach the Lebombo Border Post with Mozambique at Komatipoort, where it crosses the Komati River and becomes the EN4 road which provides access to Maputo, the capital city of Mozambique (90 kilometres away). The border settlement on the Mozambique side is named Ressano Garcia.

== Alternative Route ==
The section from Rustenburg through Pretoria, Bronkhorstspruit, Witbank and Middelburg to Wonderfontein (approximately 50 km east of Middelburg) has a route running parallel to it, namely the R104 route. It passes through the town centres of every town while the N4 highway bypasses every town between Rustenburg and Wonderfontein. Only the alternative route between Witbank and Middelburg has a different designation (it forms part of the R555 route rather than the R104). The R104 can be used to avoid the tollgates located on the N4 highway between the mentioned towns.

As there is now a northern bypass in Mbombela (Nelspruit; opened on 13 June 2010), the old route through the city centre (Samora Machel Drive; 17 km) has also been re-designated as the R104.

== History and developments ==
Prior to 1990, the N4 was only the section from Mozambique to the Proefplaas Interchange with the N1. However, two western sections of the N4 have been made since then:

=== Old Route through Pretoria ===
Originally, the N4 ran westwards from the Proefplaas Interchange through the Pretoria CBD on regular city streets and then exited the CBD westbound on Vom Hagen Street towards Hartbeespoort Dam to become the Magalies Freeway, a 20 km tolled dual carriageway (two lanes in each direction; with a toll gate at either end of the freeway), completed in the early 1990s, before following the R511/R513/R512 regional routes over the Magaliesberg to meet the single-carriageway freeway built in the 1980s to a point northwest of Pretoria.

Firstly, the N4 ran through Pretoria's central area on regular city streets. It ran westwards from the Proefplaas Interchange as two one way-streets (Pretorius Street westwards from the N1 and Francis Baard Street, formerly Schoeman Street, eastwards to the N1) through Hatfield up to a junction in Arcadia, where it turned northwards as two one-way streets again (Steve Biko Street northwards and Hamilton Street southwards) before turning westwards as two one-way streets again (Johannes Ramokhoase Street, formerly Proes Street, westwards and Struben Street eastwards) to pass through the Pretoria CBD. Just after the Pretoria CBD (at the junction with Es'kia Mphahlele Drive), the N4 ceased to be one-way streets and became one street westwards named Vom Hagen Street and at the junction with Transoranje Road (R55) in Pretoria West, it became the Magalies Toll Freeway westwards towards Hartbeespoort.

The Magalies Toll Freeway, which is a tolled dual-carriageway motorway with two lanes in each direction, begins at the junction with the R55 in Pretoria West and heads westwards for 18 km (with one off-ramp junction north of Atteridgeville) before abruptly ending south-east of Hartbeespoort (east of Pelindaba) at an off-ramp junction, where the road southwards connects to Pelindaba and Broederstroom (7 km away) and the road northwards connects to the R511 road to Hartbeespoort (7 km away). It has the Quagga Toll Plaza just west of the R55 junction and the Pelindaba Toll Plaza just before the off-ramp junction near Hartbeespoort. It is clear from the geometry of the western terminus that the N4 Magalies Freeway was meant to continue further west, but the necessary link from the end of the freeway near Hartbeespoort to the N4 extension west of Hartbeespoort has not been completed, even though it had been planned since the 1980s. An anomaly is the bridge over Hartbeespoort Dam west of Broederstroom which has the R512 route number, and the two obvious deviations off the alignment at either end of the bridge where the N4 was clearly intended to continue onward.

Where the N4 used to run through Pretoria's central area, Pretorius Street and Francis Baard Street (east-west one way streets) are now designated as part of the M2 metropolitan route while Steve Biko Street and Hamilton Street (north-south one-way streets) are now designated as part of the M5 metropolitan route while Johannes Ramokhoase Street and Struben Street, together with Vom Hagen Street and the Magalies Freeway, are now designated as part of the M4 metropolitan route.

=== New Route ===
At the Proefplaas Interchange with the N1, the N4 now joins the N1 north (co-signed) up to just before the Pumulani Toll Plaza, where it splits off westward towards Rustenburg to become the Platinum Highway. The N4 now bypasses Pretoria through the east and the north as a four-lane dual-carriageway motorway (the Pretoria Bypass). After Rosslyn, the N4 becomes a single carriageway highway, and joins the old R27 alignment at the R512 junction south of Brits. Three new grade-separated junctions were built before Rustenburg, as well as a new single-carriageway bypass of Rustenburg to the south of the town. Thereafter the N4 rejoins the old alignment of the R27 just west of Rustenburg, and passes along the R27 alignment through the towns of Swartruggens and Zeerust. Just west of Zeerust, the N4 turns northwest towards the Botswana border. The toll gates can be bypassed between Rustenburg and Pretoria by following the old Rustenburg Road, now designated as the R104.

=== Extension of Old Route ===
As an extension of the old route from Pretoria Central through the Hartbeespoort area to the west, a new freeway has been built and opened on the western side of the Hartbeespoort Dam in the North West Province, named the Pampoen Nek Pass. This freeway was built as a dual carriageway in order for traffic coming from Pretoria West (and areas like Johannesburg) heading towards Brits, Sun City and Rustenburg to proceed without having to interfere with the local traffic of Hartbeespoort. A company named Zutari was called on in 2008 to do a geotechnical analysis to determine the approximate quantity of suitable material in the dyke of the cutting followed by a slope stability analysis, with the project being launched in April 2017 by Aveng-Lobocom Joint Venture.

The Pampoen Nek Pass is an extension of the R512 route, starting from the R512's interchange with the R560 route (just after the R512 bridge crossing over the Hartbeespoort Dam's western edge west of Broederstroom) and going north for 6 kilometres as a dual carriageway over a section of the Magaliesberg up to the R512's interchange with the N4 south of Brits, where the Pampoen Nek Highway joins the N4 Westbound. So, for motorists heading for Sun City or Rustenburg (or the western side of Brits), this route will not only save substantial time for motorists travelling from the south of Hartbeespoort, but will also alleviate traffic congestion in Hartbeespoort, especially on the R511 route and the routes around Damdoryn (just west of the Hartbeespoort Dam wall).

On 3 September 2020, the Minister of Transport, Fikile Mbalula, together with the South African National Roads Agency (SANRAL) and the Madibeng Local Municipality, officially opened the new road. During the opening of the freeway, SANRAL said that the second phase of the project will be to link the Pampoen Nek Highway to the M4 Freeway (Magalies Toll Route) to Pretoria. Road signs on the new road indicate that the newly-built 6-kilometre section of the Pampoen Nek Pass is designated as part of the R512 (from the R560 and R512 interchange to the interchange where the R512 turns northwards towards Brits). It cost R377 million to build.

Although this 6 km route is part of the R512 route, it was constructed and is officially registered as part of National Route 4 Section 12, indicating that it is part of the old alignment of the N4, which was the main route from Pretoria into the North West Province before the Platinum Highway (which is the northern section of the Pretoria Bypass) was constructed.

== Operations ==
=== Platinum Highway ===
The N4 West Platinum Highway toll route (west of Pretoria) is currently operated by the Bakwena consortium under license from the South African National Roads Agency Limited (SANRAL). They operate the entire route from the Doornpoort Interchange in Pretoria to the Skilpadshek border, amounting to 295 kilometres. In addition, they operate the section of the N1 from the Proefplaas Interchange in Pretoria to the R516 off-ramp near Bela-Bela, amounting to 90 kilometres.

Bakwena entered into this 30-year toll concession with SANRAL in October 2000, with the contract commencing on 28 August 2001.

Some of the projects done by Bakwena on the Platinum Highway include transforming the 31 km section of the freeway from the Buffelspoort interchange (east of the Marikana Toll Plaza) to the R512 Brits interchange into a dual carriageway from 2009 up to November 2014 and transforming the 32 km section of the freeway from the M17 off-ramp near Ga-Rankuwa up to the R512 Brits interchange into a dual carriageway from March 2018 to October 2021.

There is currently construction of a second carriageway on the Platinum Highway from the R52 intersection just west of Rustenburg to the Buffelspoort interchange after the Marikana Toll Plaza (due for completion in 2028), which will make the entire freeway from Rustenburg to Pretoria into a dual-carriageway freeway once completed.

=== Trans African Concessions ===
The N4 East toll route (Maputo Corridor; east of Pretoria) is currently operated by Trans African Concessions (TRAC) under license from SANRAL. They operate the entire route from the M10 (Solomon Mahlangu Drive) off-ramp approximately 10 kilometres east of the Proefplaas Interchange to the Lebombo border (amounting to 405 kilometres). TRAC also operates the 90 km continuation of the road from the Lebombo border post to Maputo (EN4).

Trans African Concessions entered into this 30-year public-private partnership toll concession with SANRAL in 1997. Initially, on the South African side, they were only given the section from Balmoral (20 km west of Witbank) to the Lebombo Border but they were later given the remaining section from Balmoral to Pretoria.

One of the projects done by TRAC on the Maputo Corridor is the Mbombela Northern Bypass (opened on 13 June 2010).

== Junctions ==
=== North West ===
Municipality	Location	km	mi	Exit	Destinations	Notes
A2 ends at Botswana–South Africa border; N4 begins
Ramotshere Moiloa	Skilpadshek	0	0	Skilpadshek Border Post		
Ramotshere Moiloa	Zeerust	0	0	—	R49 south, Ottoshoop, Mafikeng	At-grade intersection; Western end of concurrency with R49
Ramotshere Moiloa	Zeerust	0	0	—	R49 President Street/Gerrit Maritz Street north, Kopfontein, Gaborone (Botswana)	At-grade intersection; Eastern end of concurrency with R49
Kgetlengrivier	Swartruggens	0	0	SANRAL Swartruggens Toll Plaza		
Kgetlengrivier	Swartruggens	0	0	—	R53, Ventersdorp	At-grade intersection
Kgetlengrivier	Swartruggens	0	0	—	R509, Koster	At-grade intersection
Kgetlengrivier	Moedwil	0	0	—	R52, Koster	At-grade intersection
Rustenburg	Phokeng	0	0	169	R104 Swartruggens Road, Donkerhoek Road, Rustenburg, R565 Ottoman Highway, Phokeng, Sun City	
Rustenburg	Rustenburg	0	0	176	Dr Moroka Drive, Rustenburg Kloof, Rustenburg	
Rustenburg	Rustenburg	0	0	179	Helen Joseph Drive, Rustenburg	Westbound exit, eastbound entrance
Rustenburg	Rustenburg	0	0	182	R24, Rustenburg, Magaliesburg, Krugersdorp	
Rustenburg	Kroondal	0	0	188	R104, Kroondal, Buffelspoort	Tolled eastbound exit and westbound entrance
Rustenburg	Kroondal	0	0	SANRAL Marikana Toll Plaza		
Rustenburg	Marikana	0	0	207	Marikana Road, R104, Buffelspoort, Marikana	Tolled westbound exit and eastbound entrance
Madibeng	Mooinooi	0	0	214	Lonrho Drive, Mooinooi, Marikana	
Madibeng	Modderspruit	0	0	225	R556, Modderspruit, Bapong, Majakaneng, Sun City	
Madibeng	Brits	0	0	233	Pampoen Nek Pass, R104, Hartbeespoort, R512, Randburg	Eastbound exit, westbound entrance
Madibeng	Brits	0	0	238	R512, Brits, Randburg	
Madibeng	Hartbeespoort	0	0	245	R511, Hartbeespoort, Brits	
Madibeng	Mmakau	0	0	SANRAL Brits Toll Plaza		
Madibeng	Mmakau	0	0	255	M21 Kgware Road, Mmakau, Ga-Rankuwa	Eastbound exit, westbound entrance
N4 continues into Gauteng

=== Gauteng ===
Municipality	Location	km	mi	Exit	Destinations	Notes
Tshwane	Akasia	0	0	265	M17 Hornsnek Road, Ga-Rankuwa, Akasia, Pretoria (West)	Westbound exit, eastbound entrance
Tshwane	Akasia	0	0	272	R80 Mabopane Highway, Soshanguve, Pretoria	
Tshwane	Pretoria North	0	0	276	R566 Rosslyn Road, Pretoria North, Rosslyn	
Tshwane	Pretoria North	0	0	282	Wonderboom Connector, Annlin, Wonderboom National	
Tshwane	Pretoria North	0	0	286A	M29 Dr Swanepoel Road, Doornpoort, Montana	Tolled exit and entrance
Tshwane	Pretoria North	0	0	286B	Engen 1 Stop Service Area	
Tshwane	Pretoria North	0	0	SANRAL Doornpoort Toll Plaza		
Tshwane	Pretoria North	0	0	(156)	N1, Polokwane, Pretoria, Johannesburg	Northern end of concurrency with N1
Tshwane	Pretoria	0	0	(152)	R513 Sefako Makgatho Drive, Pretoria North, Cullinan	Tolled northbound exit and southbound entrance; Diverging diamond interchange
Tshwane	Pretoria	0	0	(148)	M8 Stormvoël Road, Gezina, Mamelodi	Tolled northbound exit and southbound entrance
Tshwane	Pretoria	0	0	(145)	M2 Pretorius Street/Francis Baard Street, Pretoria, N1, Johannesburg, O. R. Tambo International	Southern end of concurrency with N1
Tshwane	Pretoria	0	0	3	M14 Lynburn Road/Tambotie Avenue, Watermeyer Street, Val de Grace, Meyerspark	
Tshwane	Pretoria	0	0	5	M13 Rossouw Street, Murrayfield, Die Wilgers	
Tshwane	Pretoria	0	0	7	M12 Simon Vermooten Road, La Montagne, Equestria	
Tshwane	Pretoria	0	0	11	M10 Solomon Mahlangu Drive, Garsfontein, Mamelodi	
Tshwane	Rayton	0	0	18	Boschkop, Donkerhoek	Tolled eastbound exit and westbound entrance
Tshwane	Rayton	0	0	27	R515, Rayton, Cullinan	Tolled eastbound exit and westbound entrance
Tshwane	Rayton	0	0	SANRAL Diamond Hill Toll Plaza		
Tshwane	Bronkhorstspruit	0	0	37	Witfontein, Valtaki	Tolled westbound exit and eastbound entrance
Tshwane	Bronkhorstspruit	0	0	45	R568, Ekandustria, Bronkhorstspruit (West)	Tolled westbound exit and eastbound entrance
Tshwane	Bronkhorstspruit	0	0	50	R25, Bronkhorstspruit (East), Kempton Park	
Tshwane	Bronkhorstspruit	0	0	62	Bossemanskraal, Wilgerivier	
N4 continues into Mpumalanga

=== Mpumalanga ===
Municipality	Location	km	mi	Exit	Destinations	Notes
Emalahleni	Balmoral	0	0	75	R104, Balmoral, R545, Kusile, Ogies	
Emalahleni	KwaGuqa	0	0	86	R104, Highveld, Wakefield, Kromdraai	
Emalahleni	KwaGuqa	0	0	92	R104 Mathews Phosa Street, KwaGuqa, Clewer	
Emalahleni	Witbank	0	0	95	Schonland Drive, KwaThomas Mahlanguville, Ferrobank	
Emalahleni	Witbank	0	0	99	R555 Walter Sisulu Drive, Witbank, Ogies	
Emalahleni	Witbank	0	0	101	R544 O. R. Tambo Drive, Witbank, Bethal	
Emalahleni	Witbank	0	0	103	N12, Benoni, Johannesburg	Westbound exit, eastbound entrance
Emalahleni	Witbank	0	0	105	Mandela Drive, Witbank, Bankenveld	
Steve Tshwete	Middelburg	0	0	SANRAL Middelburg Toll Plaza		
Steve Tshwete	Middelburg	0	0	120	R575, Middelburg (West), Van Dyksdrift	
Steve Tshwete	Middelburg	0	0	126	R35 Samora Machel Street, Middelburg, Bethal	
Steve Tshwete	Middelburg	0	0	133	N11, Middelburg (East), Hendrina	
Steve Tshwete	Middelburg	0	0	148	R104, Pan, Woestalleen	
Steve Tshwete	Middelburg	0	0	153	R104, Arnot, Rietkuil	
Emakhazeni	Belfast	0	0	—	R104, Arnot	At-grade intersection
Emakhazeni	Belfast	0	0	190	R33 Bhekumuzi Masango Drive, Belfast, Dullstroom, Carolina	
Emakhazeni	Machadodorp	0	0	—	R36 Molen Street south, Machadodorp, Carolina	Western end of concurrency with R36
Emakhazeni	Machadodorp	0	0	SANRAL Machado Toll Plaza		
Emakhazeni	Waterval Boven	0	0	219	R36 north, Lydenburg	Signed as Exit 219 eastbound only; At-grade intersection; Eastern end of concurrency with R36
Mbombela	Alkmaar	0	0	283	R539 west, Schoemanskloof, Lydenburg	Western end of concurrency with R539
Mbombela	Alkmaar	0	0	—	R539 east, Hendriksdal, Sabie	Eastern end of concurrency with R539
Mbombela	Mbombela	0	0	320	R104 Samora Machel Drive, Mbombela, Barberton	Eastbound exit, westbound entrance
Mbombela	Mbombela	0	0	325	R37, Riverside, Lydenburg, R40, White River	
Mbombela	Mbombela	0	0	333	R104 Samora Machel Drive, Mbombela, Barberton	Westbound exit, eastbound entrance
Mbombela	KaNyamazane	0	0	340	R538, KaNyamazane, Kruger Mpumalanga International, R104, Steiltes	
Nkomazi	Matsulu	0	0	—	R38, Barberton	At-grade intersection
Nkomazi	Matsulu	0	0	SANRAL Nkomazi Toll Plaza		
Nkomazi	Malalane	0	0	—	R570, Kruger National Park (Malelane Gate), Schoemansdal, Jeppes Reef	At-grade intersection
Nkomazi	Komatipoort	0	0	—	R571 Rissik Street north, Komatipoort, Kruger National Park (Crocodile Bridge Gate)	At-grade intersection; Western end of concurrency with R571
Nkomazi	Komatipoort	0	0	—	R571 south, Tonga, Mananga	At-grade intersection; Eastern end of concurrency with R571
Nkomazi	Komatipoort	0	0	Lebombo Border Post		
N4 ends at South Africa–Mozambique border; EN4 EN4 begins
