= R539 (South Africa) =

Regional Route in Mpumalanga, South Africa

Regional route R539

Route information
- Length: 72.8 km (45.2 mi)

Major junctions
- West end: R36 at Bambi
- N4 at Montrose
- East end: R37 at Rosehaugh

Location
- Country: South Africa

Highway system
- Numbered routes of South Africa
← R538	→ R540

The R539 is a Regional Route in Mpumalanga, South Africa. It connects the R36 between eNtokozweni (Machadodorp) and Mashishing (Lydenburg) with the R37 between Sabie and Nelspruit.

== Route ==
Its western origin is a junction with the R36 at Bambi, approximately 26 kilometres north-east of eNtokozweni (Machadodorp). It runs east for 45 kilometres, through De Beersnek Pass, Patattanek, and Schoemanskloof pass to join the N4 (Maputo Corridor) approximately 16 kilometres north of Ngodwana. The R539 joins the N4 to be cosigned for 4 kilometres through the Montrose pass, crossing the Crocodile River. It leaves the N4 on the eastern side of the pass, heading north-north-east to end at a junction with the R37 at Rosehaugh, approximately 30 kilometres south of Sabie.

In August 2023, upgrades to the N4/Montrose/Schoemanskloof interchange were completed as part of the Maputo Corridor Development initiative. The project included four new interchange ramps and the widening of the existing Crocodile Bridge from two lanes to five lanes, improving the road infrastructure at the point where the R539 connects with the N4.
