= Pretoria Ring Road =

Road in South Africa

Pretoria Bypass

Route information
- Length: 67 km (42 mi)
- Existed: 2008–present

Major junctions
- Beltway around Pretoria
- N14 / N1 (Ben Schoeman Highway) at Brakfontein Interchange; N1 in to N4 (Platinum Highway) near Doornpoort; N4 at the Brits Toll Plaza

Location
- Country: South Africa

Highway system
- Numbered routes of South Africa

The Pretoria Ring Road, also known as the Pretoria Bypass, is a collection of two bypasses that together form a partial ring road around the city of Pretoria, South Africa. It consists of a section of the N1 highway (known as the Eastern Bypass) as well as a section of the N4 highway (known as the Northern Bypass). It is entirely in the City of Tshwane Metropolitan Municipality.

== Route ==
=== Eastern Bypass ===
The Pretoria Eastern Bypass is formed by the N1 highway, from the Brakfontein Interchange with the Ben Schoeman Freeway (N1; N14) in Centurion to the Doornpoort Interchange with the Platinum Highway (N4) in northern Pretoria, a length of approximately 30 km.

It heads north-east from Brakfontein (bypassing Centurion CBD) and then turns north after the Flying Saucer Interchange with the R21 highway, eventually reaching the Proefplaas Interchange east of Pretoria CBD, where it meets the N4 highway (Maputo Corridor) coming from eMalahleni and Mbombela in the east. Here, the N4 designation joins the N1 northwards to be co-signed for 12 km up to the Doornpoort Interchange, where the N4 becomes the Platinum Highway (Pretoria Northern Bypass) westwards towards Brits and Rustenburg while the N1 continues north on its present highway towards Mokopane and Polokwane.

The section of the Eastern Bypass from the Brakfontein Interchange to the Proefplaas Interchange, which is also known as the Danie Joubert Freeway, is a toll-free section while the remaining 12 km section to Doornpoort is a toll road with physical toll booths at the northbound ramp exits. At the Doornpoort Interchange is the Pumulani Toll Plaza on the N1 north and the Doornpoort Toll Plaza on the N4 west.

The section of the Eastern Bypass from the Brakfontein Interchange to the Proefplaas interchange was part of the Gauteng e-toll system and had open road tolling from 3 December 2013 onwards. On 12 April 2024, e-tolls were discontinued in Gauteng, effectively making this section of the road a toll-free section. SANRAL maintains the toll-free section while Bakwena maintains the N1/N4 section from the Proefplaas Interchange northwards.

At the Brakfontein Interchange, a highway links south-west to Krugersdorp (designated as the N14) while the Ben Schoeman Freeway links north to the Pretoria CBD (designated as the N14) and south to Midrand and Johannesburg (designated as the N1).

=== Northern Bypass ===
The Pretoria Northern Bypass is formed by the N4 highway, from the Doornpoort Interchange with the N1 highway (Eastern Bypass) to the Brits Toll Plaza, a length of approximately 36 km.

It heads west from the Doornpoort Toll Plaza, bypassing Wonderboom Airport and Onderstepoort, to reach an interchange with the R80 highway (Mabopane Highway; which connects with Mabopane and Soshanguve in the north) in Akasia. It continues westwards to reach the Brits Toll Plaza, where it leaves the City of Tshwane Metropolitan Municipality, enters the North West Province and proceeds to Brits and Rustenburg.

The Northern Bypass is part of the Platinum Highway maintained by Bakwena.

== Significance ==
Before the opening of the Northern Bypass, the N4 national route, which is coming from Witbank and Mbombela in the east, passed westwards through Pretoria from the Proefplaas Interchange on regular city streets (today designated as the M2 and M4 roads) and exited Pretoria westbound as the Magalies Toll Route, a 20 km tolled highway to Hartbeespoort.

This new realignment of the N4 (the Northern Bypass) means that both Hartbeespoort and Pretoria Central are now bypassed to the north for east–west traffic. Traffic coming from Rustenburg in the west and heading towards towns east (and south) of Pretoria no-longer has to pass through the city centre and interfere with local traffic.

Before the opening of the Eastern Bypass, the N1 national route, which is coming from Johannesburg in the south, passed northwards through Pretoria on regular city streets (today designated as the R101) and exited Pretoria northbound on Lavender Road/Old Warmbaths Road.

This new realignment of the N1 (the Eastern Bypass) means that Pretoria Central is now bypassed to the east for north–south traffic. Traffic coming from Polokwane in the north and heading towards towns south (and south-west) of Pretoria no-longer has to pass through the city centre.

== See also ==
- N1 (South Africa)
- N4 (South Africa)
- National Roads in South Africa
