= Schoemans Kloof =

Schoemans Kloof Pass
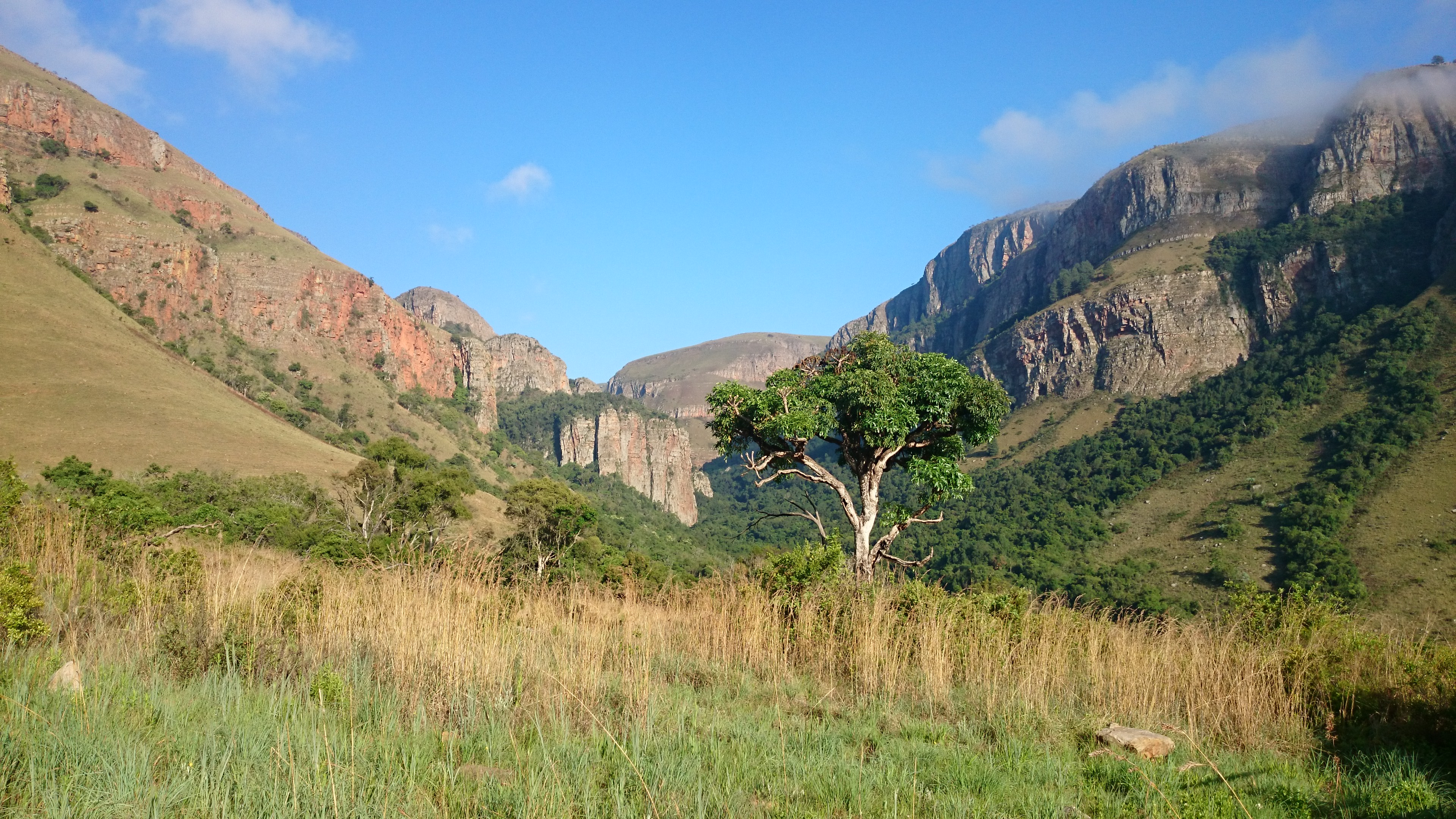
- Schoemans Kloof landscape

- Location within South Africa
- Elevation: 1,276 metres (4,186 ft)

Third Approach
- Location: Between Machadodorp and Nelspruit, South Africa
- Range: Drakensberg Mountains
- Coordinates: 25°27′16″S 30°25′18″E

Schoemans Kloof Pass, or simply Schoemanskloof, /ˈskuːmənzˈkluːf/ is situated in Mpumalanga province, on the R539 road between the junction with the R36 at Bambi (23 kilometres north of Machadodorp) and the junction with the N4 about 16 kilometres north of Ngodwana (South Africa). This scenic region is the access route that connects Gauteng to the warm Lowveld and Kruger National Park. The N4 highway is the pulse of this area as it runs along the Crocodile River. The agriculture in the area is dominated by citrus farming. Eco Tourism and hospitality in the Schoemanskloof is popular with travellers en route to the Kruger National Park with the first Mountain Links Golf Course set on the picturesque mountain range.

Schoemanskloof is rich in history named after the Schoeman Brothers who resided in the valley on the Groot Trek. Schoemanskloof main annual attraction is the Schoemanskloof Citrus festival held at the Wolwekrans Lodge. This annual festival attracts around 30,000 people every year.

Outdoor activities include mountain biking, quad biking, hiking, horse riding, and freshwater fishing.
