= West Acres, Mbombela =

Suburb of Mbombela, South Africa

West Acres
- Suburb
- Location within Mpumalanga Location within South Africa Location within Africa
- Coordinates: 25°28′48″S 30°57′25″E
- Country: South Africa
- Province: Mpumalanga
- District: Ehlanzeni
- Municipality: Mbombela
- Main Place: Mbombela

Area
  - Total: 4.28 km^{2} (1.65 sq mi)

Population (2011)
  - Total: 11 642
  - Density: 2.6/km^{2} (6.7/sq mi)

Racial makeup (2011)
  - White: 66.6%
  - Black African: 27.6%
  - Indian/Asian: 2.8%
  - Coloured: 2.3%
  - Other: 0.6%

First languages (2011)
  - Afrikaans: 56.4%
  - English: 25.1%
  - Swazi: 7.3%
  - Zulu: 2.8%
  - Other: 8.4%
- Time zone: UTC+2 (SAST)
- Postal code (street): 1200
- PO box: 1211
- Area code: 013

West Acres is a large suburb of Mbombela in Mpumalanga, South Africa and is situated just south-west of the Mbombela CBD.

== Retail ==
West Acres comprises i'Langa Mall, one of the largest shopping centres in Mbombela and Mpumalanga and is located along Samora Machel Drive.

== Roads ==
West Acres is bounded by two arterial routes, namely; to the north by the R104 (Samora Machel Drive) and the R40 (Madiba Drive) to the east. The R104 which passes through the Mbombela CBD provides access to the N4 highway (to eMalahleni and Malalane) while the R40 connects to White River in the north and Barberton in the south.

It is also intersected by Dr. Enos Mabuza Drive connecting to Sonheuwel and Steiltes in the east and Kaapschehoop Road connecting to Kaapschehoop and Hermannsburg in the south-west.
