= R569 road =

R569 road may refer to:

- R569 road (Ireland)
- R569 (South Africa)
