= R47 =

R47 may refer to:

- R47 (London Underground car)
- R47 (South Africa), a road
- R47: May cause birth defects, a risk phrase
