= Jacobsdal, North West =

Jacobsdal
- Location within North West (South African province) Location within South Africa
- Coordinates: 25.630°S 26.071°E
- Country: South Africa
- Province: North West
- District: Ngaka Modiri Molema
- Municipality: Ramotshere Moiloa
- Time zone: UTC+2 (SAST)
- Postal code (street): 8710
- PO box: 8710
- Area code: 018

Jacobsdal was a hamlet in South Africa 13 km south of Zeerust and 18 km north-east of Ottoshoop. It was laid out on the farm Vergenoegd 46 and named after its owner, David Jacobs. It declined after the establishment of Zeerust a short distance away.
