= Makhubung =

- Suburb
- Location within South Africa
- Coordinates: 25.8688196°S 25.4652478°E
- Country: South Africa

Makhubung is a small suburb along National Road R49 in the country of South Africa, situated near the border of the larger town of Mahikeng.

== See also ==
- Economy of South Africa
- History of South Africa
