= Skilpadshek =

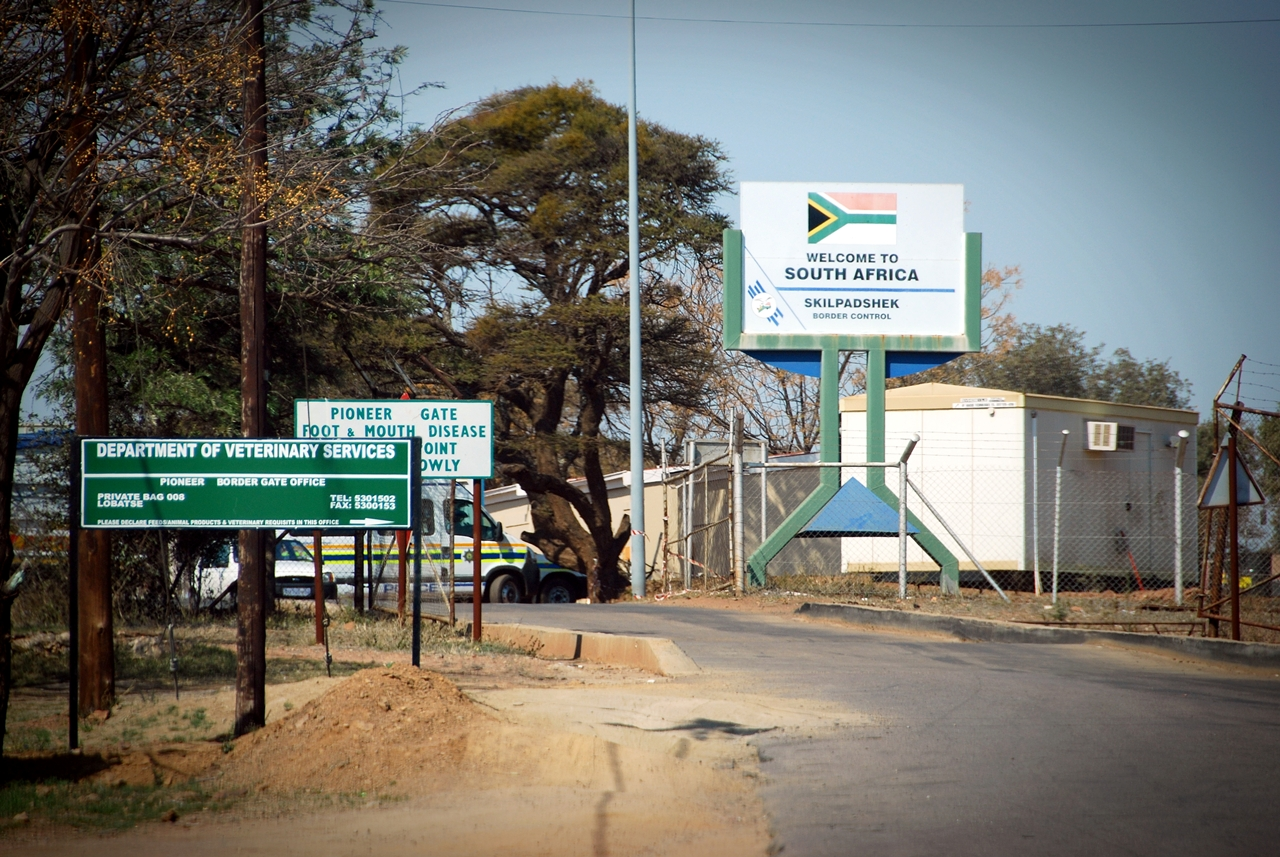
- Border gate at Skilpadshe

- Location within North West (South African province) Location within South Africa
- Coordinates: 25.2758°S 25.7142°E
- Country: South Africa
- Province: North West
- District: Ngaka Modiri Molema
- Municipality: Ramotshere Moiloa

Area
  - Total: 1.19 km^{2} (0.46 sq mi)

Population (2011)
  - Total: 188
  - Density: 158/km^{2} (409/sq mi)

Racial makeup (2011)
  - African: 97.9%
  - Coloured: 0.5%
  - White: 1.1%
  - Other: 0.5%

First languages (2011)
  - Tswana: 41.8%
  - Xhosa: 8.2%
  - Tsonga: 8.2%
  - Northern Sotho: 7.6%
  - Other: 34.1%
- Time zone: UTC+2 (SAST)

Skilpadshek (Afrikaans for tortoise gate) is a border checkpoint on the South African border with Botswana, located 52 kilometres (32 mi) north-west of Zeerust in North West province. The corresponding checkpoint on the Botswana side of the border is called Pioneer Gate. The Trans-Kalahari Corridor passes through Skilpadshek, and it is the western end of the N4 road (Platinum Highway), which continues in Botswana as the A2.

== See also ==
- List of Botswana–South Africa border crossings
