= Zeerust =

Town in North West Province, South Africa

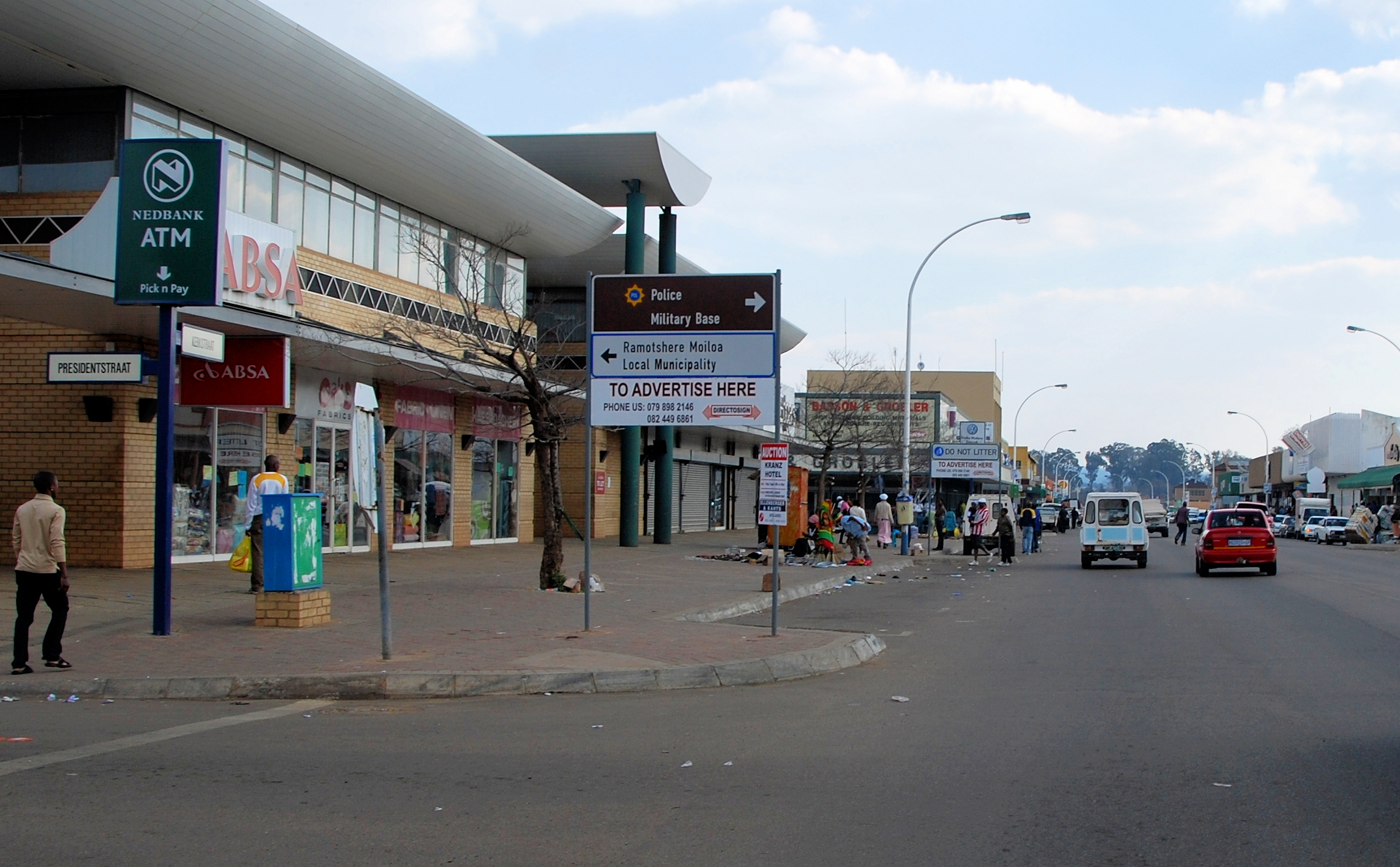
- Church street in Zeerust

- Location within North West (South African province) Location within South Africa
- Coordinates: 25°32′S 26°05′E
- Country: South Africa
- Province: North West
- District: Ngaka Modiri Molema
- Municipality: Ramotshere Moiloa

Area
  - Total: 57.09 km^{2} (22.04 sq mi)

Population (2011)
  - Total: 9,093
  - Density: 159.3/km^{2} (412.5/sq mi)

Racial makeup (2011)
  - Black African: 57.2%
  - White: 25.3%
  - Coloured: 8.5%
  - Indian/Asian: 7.4%
  - Other: 1.6%

First languages (2011)
  - Afrikaans: 35.1%
  - Tswana: 32.1%
  - English: 16.5%
  - Northern Sotho: 1.2%
  - Other: 15.1%
- Time zone: UTC+2 (SAST)
- Postal code (street): 2865
- PO box: 2865
- Area code: 018

Zeerust is a commercial town situated in the Ngaka Modiri Molema district of North West Province, South Africa. It lies in the Marico valley, approximately 240 kilometres northwest of Johannesburg. It lies on the N4, the main road link between South Africa and Botswana. There are large cattle ranches in the area, as well as wheat, maize, tobacco and citrus fruit farms. There are also fluorite and chromite mines in the vicinity. Tourism is also a developing industry.

== History ==
The original name of the farm on which the town was established was Sefatlhane/Sebatlani (meaning dusty place) belonging to Casper Hendrik Coetzee who bought it in 1858. The farm was later renamed Hazenjacht, and after that Hazia/Hazeah.

Casper Coetzee contracted Walter Seymore to build a church and a fort on this farm, but Casper died before this was completed. In 1866, the farm then came into the hands of Diederik Jacobus Coetzee, who saw the potential of developing a town on the farm. He measured out some erven with the idea of starting a town, using "Ox riems" to measure out the plots instead of the accepted surveyors chains.

On 20 March 1867, the first erven of the newly established Coetzee-Rust were sold per public auction in Potchefstroom, before official recognition of the request to start a town was granted. The village gained official recognition in 1868, and later gained a landdrost (magistrate) in November 1871.

The name Coetzee's Rust was later abbreviated to Zeerust. Municipal status was obtained on 18 March 1936. Zeerust however wasn't the first town in this area. That honour belongs to Jacobsdal, a small village about 10 km south of Zeerust situated on the farm Vergenoegd, near the Lucerne station. The popularity of Zeerust as trading centre caused the demise of Jacobsdal, and now it does not exist as a town anymore.

== Natural features ==
Two rivers flow through Zeerust, the Klein-Marico and the Karee spruit. Irrigation farming just outside the town relies on these water bodies.

== Development ==
=== Olienhout Park ===
In Zeerust there is also a small suburb named Olienhout Park, which is located before another suburb named Sandvlakte, with a population of about 250 residents, a few shops, a bar, a Lutheran church, and a school. There is a township nearby named Ikageleng with about 1000 people.

=== Mining ===
The Zeerust Chromium Mine was first developed in 1942. Today this mine is a surface and underground operation, consisting of four distinct surface and underground workings extending 750 hectares. The ore mined is composed of chromite and magnetite.

=== Access to Madikwe Game Reserve ===
Madikwe Game Reserve can be accessed through Zeerust about 90 kilometres north of the town.

=== Roads ===
The N4 road (Platinum Highway) connects westwards to the Skilpadshek border with Botswana near Lobatse (52 kilometres away) and eastwards to Swartruggens, Rustenburg and Pretoria.

The R49 road connects northwards to the Tlokweng border with Botswana near Gaborone (103 kilometres away) and south-west to Ottoshoop and Mafikeng.

== In popular culture ==
Zeerust has an entry in Douglas Adams' and John Lloyd's spoof dictionary The Meaning of Liff, in which place names are given humorous definitions. Zeerust is defined as an abstract noun, meaning the datedness of things that were originally meant to look futuristic.

== References and external links ==
- Pieter de Jager (2001). Die Korannafonteiners. Verlag: Privately published, Ottosdal, 2001.
- General information about Zeerust, tourismnorthwest.co.za. Accessed 6 August 2023.
