= Alkmaar, South Africa =

Alkmaar
- Location within Mpumalanga Location within South Africa
- Coordinates: 25.449°S 30.833°E
- Country: South Africa
- Province: Mpumalanga
- District: Ehlanzeni
- Municipality: Mbombela
- Time zone: UTC+2 (SAST)

Alkmaar is a hamlet on the Crocodile River some 18 km west of Nelspruit (now renamed to Mbombela), South Africa. It is named after Alkmaar in the Netherlands.

== Geography ==
Alkmaar is located in the middle of the Schagen Valley, between Nelspruit and Montrose along the N4. Alkmaar lies at an altitude of 696 meters and can also be reached by train.

== Nature ==
There is an ecotrail in Alkmaar that visitors can participate in to become aware of nature and the special environment. The Crocodile River flows nearby Alkmaar.
