= R49 (South Africa) =

Provincial route in South Africa

Provincial route R49

Route information
- Maintained by NWDPWRT
- Length: 166 km (103 mi)

Major junctions
- South end: N18 in Mahikeng
- N4 in Zeerust
- North end: A12 at the Tlokweng border with Botswana near Gaborone

Location
- Country: South Africa
- Major cities: Mahikeng, Zeerust

Highway system
- Numbered routes of South Africa
← R48	→ R50

The R49 (also sometimes known as the R47) is a provincial route in North West, South Africa that connects Mahikeng with the Botswana border at Kopfontein near Gaborone, via Zeerust.

== Route ==
Detailed Route

The R49 begins in the town centre of Mahikeng, at a junction with the N18 national route and the R503 road. It begins as Shippard Street, going eastwards to form the northern border of the Mafikeng Game Reserve. From the N18 junction, it goes east, then north-east, for 61 kilometres, through Ottoshoop, to meet the N4 national route (Platinum Highway) adjacent to the Zeerust Solar Power Station.

The N4 joins the R49 and they are one road north-east for 2 kilometres into the town of Zeerust as Church Street. In the Zeerust CBD, at the President Square junction (just before Zeerust Shopping Centre), the R49 leaves Church Street (N4; Platinum Highway) and becomes the road northwards. The R49 heads northwards for 103 kilometres to end at the Kopfontein Border Post west of the Madikwe Game Reserve and become the A12 road (Tlokweng Road) on the Botswana side, which connects westwards to Tlokweng and Gaborone (Capital of Botswana; 19 kilometres away).
