= R538 (South Africa) =

Regional route in South Africa

Regional route R538

Route information
- Length: 58.5 km (36.4 mi)

Major junctions
- South end: N4 / R104 near Mbombela
- R40 in White River; R569 near Phola
- North end: R40 near Hazyview

Location
- Country: South Africa

Highway system
- Numbered routes of South Africa
← R537	→ R539

The R538 is a Regional Route in Mpumalanga, South Africa. The route begins east of Mbombela and passes through White River to connect with Hazyview.

== Route ==
Its southern terminus is an interchange with the N4 and the R104 about 14 kilometres east of the Nelspruit (Mbombela) city centre. It begins by heading northwards for 11 kilometres, through Karino, to reach the Kruger Mpumalanga International Airport entrance. It proceeds north, then west, for 12 kilometres to enter the town centre of White River as Chief Mgiyeni Khumalo Drive and reach a junction with the R40. The R538 and the R40 join to be co-signed northwards as Theo Kleynhans Street. Just north of the town, at the Casterbridge shopping mall, the R538 splits from the R40 to become its own road north-north-east. It proceeds for 33 kilometres, passing through Phola and bypassing the Numbi Gate of the Kruger National Park (where the R569 provides access), to reach its northern terminus at an intersection with the R40 just south of Hazyview.
