= Brits Airfield =

Brits Airfield Brits Airport
- IATA: none; ICAO: FABS

Summary
- Airport type: Small Airport
- Serves: Brits
- Location: Brits
- Elevation AMSL: 3,740 ft / 1,140 m
- Coordinates: 25°31′56.4″S 27°46′29.45″E

Map
- Location in North West Province FABS (South Africa)

Runways
Direction	Length		Surface
Direction	m	ft	Surface
02/20	900	2,952	Asphalt
- Source :Our Airports.

Brits Airfield (ICAO-Code: FABS) is a small airfield located in Brits, South Africa. It mainly facilitates light and ultra-light aircraft as well as Gliders.

== Communication ==
- Communication Frequencies
  - Brits Airfield 124.20 MHz (Unmanned)

== Notes ==
- The airfield has Landing Lights. As these are not automated, arrangements need to be made in advance.
- The following fuel is available:
  - AVGAS 100 LL
  - MOGAS (only by arrangement)
