= Mooinooi =

- Location within North West (South African province) Location within South Africa
- Coordinates: 25°45′S 27°33′E
- Country: South Africa
- Province: North West
- District: Bojanala
- Municipality: Madibeng

Area
  - Total: 5.59 km^{2} (2.16 sq mi)

Population (2011)
  - Total: 4,733
  - Density: 847/km^{2} (2,190/sq mi)

Racial makeup (2011)
  - Black African: 38.0%
  - Coloured: 2.9%
  - Indian/Asian: 0.2%
  - White: 58.4%
  - Other: 0.5%

First languages (2011)
  - Afrikaans: 59.2%
  - Tswana: 13.1%
  - English: 5.7%
  - Sotho: 5.4%
  - Other: 16.6%
- Time zone: UTC+2 (SAST)
- Postal code (street): 0325
- PO box: 0325
- Area code: 014

Mooinooi is a platinum and palladium mining town in the North West province of South Africa, roughly halfway between Brits and Rustenburg.

Formerly a boomtown, the Great Recession caused the town to go bust. Former miners lost their jobs and local services had gone out of business.
