= Kroondal =

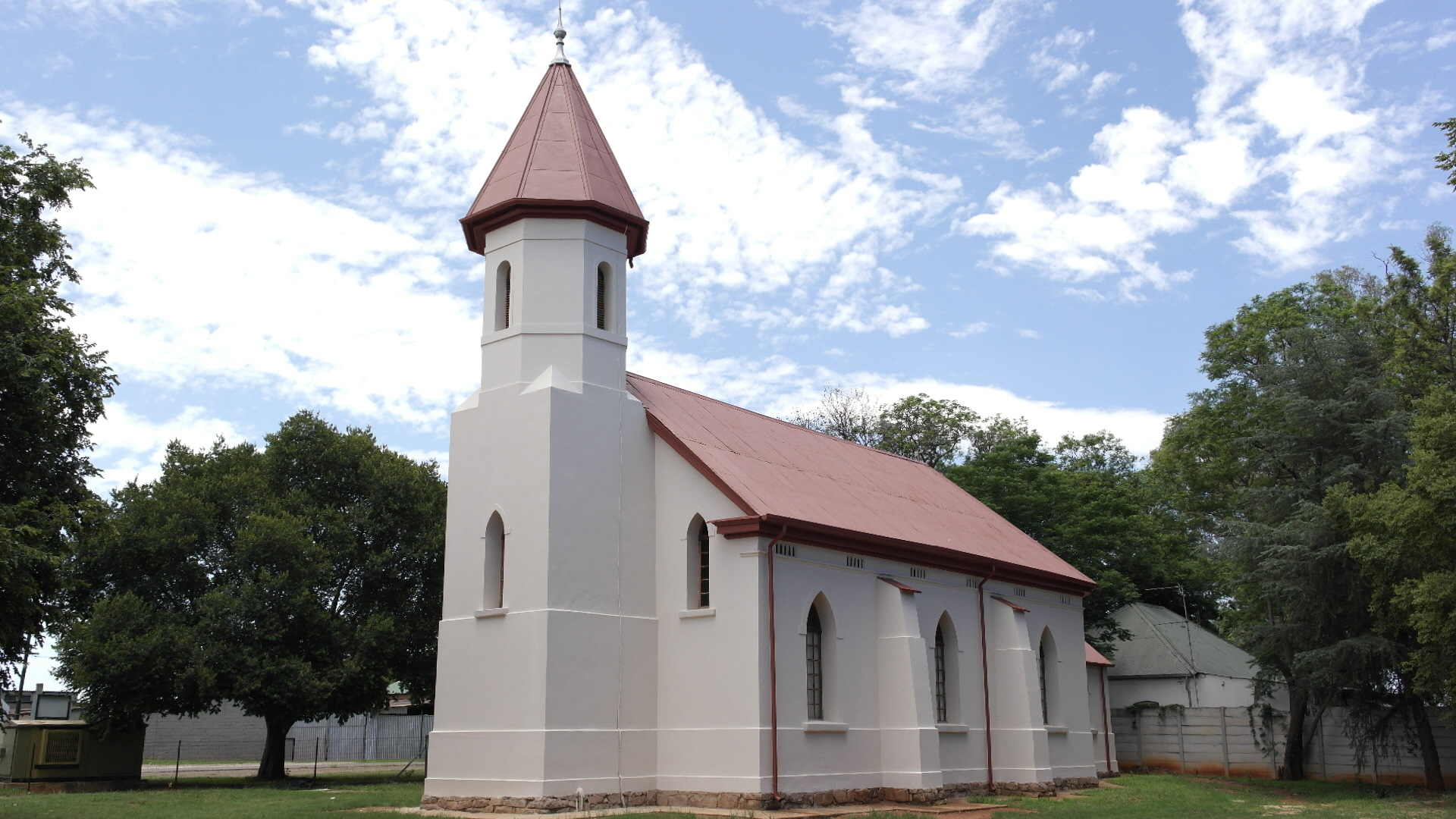
- Old Lutheran Church in Kroondal

- Location within North West (South African province) Location within South Africa
- Coordinates: 25°43′31″S 27°18′28″E
- Country: South Africa
- Province: North West
- District: Bojanala
- Municipality: Rustenburg

Population
  - Total: 3,195
- Time zone: UTC+2 (SAST)
- PO box: 0350

Kroondal is a village situated in North West Province of South Africa with a large German speaking community. It lies on the N4 road.

The village originated from a farm in existence since 1843, initially known as Kronendal, on which a mission was established - one of 22 German Lutheran missions in Natal and the former Transvaal. By 1889 a settlement was surveyed and divided into plots. The local school, established in 1892, is said to have been attended by Louis Botha, who would become South Africa's first prime minister, and Afrikaans poet JD du Toit. In fact both these men were pupils for brief periods at schools founded by missionaries of the Hermannsburg Mission Society – Botha at Hermannsburg, KwaZulu-Natal near Greytown, du Toit at Morgensonne near Rustenburg. The local church congregation counts about 400 members, and is 80% German-speaking, with most of the rest being Afrikaans speakers.

== Education ==
The town has a German secondary school, Deutsche Schule Kroondal.
