= Machadodorp =

Machadodorp eNtokozweni
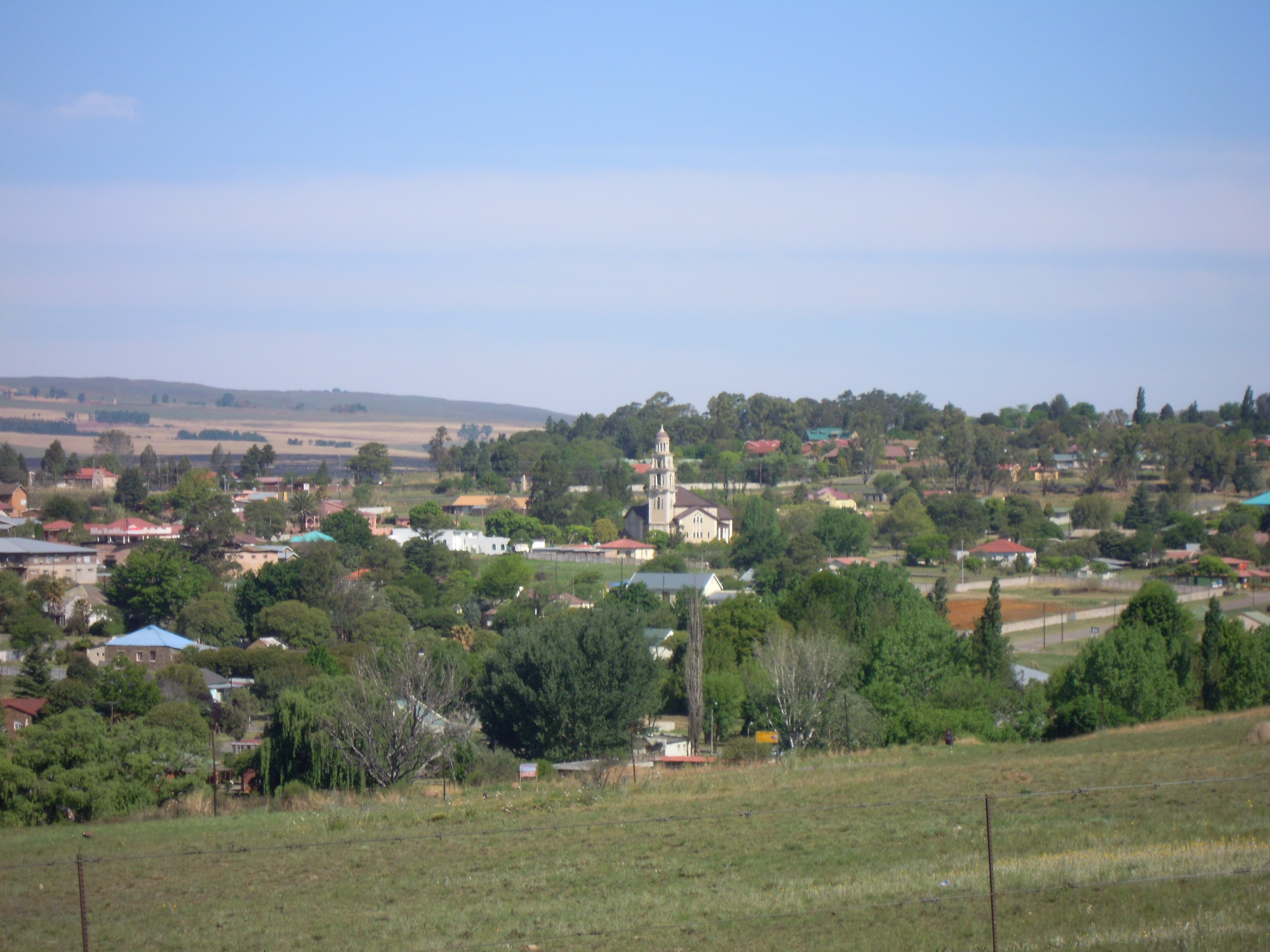
- View of the town

- Location within Mpumalanga Location within South Africa
- Coordinates: 25°40′S 30°15′E
- Country: South Africa
- Province: Mpumalanga
- District: Nkangala
- Municipality: Emakhazeni

Area
  - Total: 33.17 km^{2} (12.81 sq mi)
- Elevation: 1,550 m (5,090 ft)

Population (2011)
  - Total: 8,835
  - Density: 266.4/km^{2} (689.9/sq mi)

Racial makeup (2011)
  - Black African: 89.5%
  - Coloured: 1.4%
  - Indian/Asian: 0.7%
  - White: 8.1%
  - Other: 0.2%

First languages (2011)
  - Swazi: 45.3%
  - Zulu: 23.5%
  - Afrikaans: 8.8%
  - S. Ndebele: 7.5%
  - Other: 14.9%
- Time zone: UTC+2 (SAST)
- Postal code (street): 1170
- PO box: 1170
- Area code: 013

Machadodorp, also known by its official name eNtokozweni, is a small town situated on the N4 national highway, near the edge of the escarpment in the Mpumalanga province of South Africa. The Elands River runs through the town. There is a natural radioactive spring here that is reputed to have powerful healing qualities.

== History ==
The town grew around a station originally named Geluk, after the sheep farm it was built on, but in 1894 the name was changed to honour the Portuguese Major Joachim Machado, an engineer who had surveyed the land for the proposed Nelspruit-Delagoa Bay railway line through the Crocodile River gorge.

The settlement became a capital for a few months from 5 June 1900, but was only declared a municipal town in 1904. This quirk in history happened during the Second Boer War when the Transvaal Volksraad made the town their temporary seat, using railway carriages as their offices and mint after they had to evacuate Pretoria in the face of a British invasion.

A quick-thinking station master rescued a consignment of dying trout by dumping the fish in the Elands River, which formed the start of the town's subsequent role in Mpumalanga's trout tourism industry. With the demise of passenger trains in South Africa, the once-postcard-pretty station closed in 2001 and it is now a derelict ruin.

In the 21st century, Machadodorp's residents either work for the industries feeding a chrome smelter, or the logging industries based on the pine plantations surrounding the town. A large contingent of contract workers employed at the Nkomati mine about an hour's drive out of town also reside in Machadodorp, contributing a large part of the town's economy.

The Komati Gorge, notable for its considerable biodiversity and bluff habitats, forms a backdrop to the town.

=== Name change ===
In early 2010 the town (along with Nelspruit and Waterval Boven) had its name officially changed. The town was renamed from Machadodorp to eNtokozweni, meaning Place of Happiness. It is often still referred to as Machadodorp despite the name change.

=== baKoni ruins ===
The hills around the town are terraced with thousands of stone walls which form part of a vast complex of settlements, fields and roads. Some tour guides describe these as South Africa's "real" lost city. South of Machadodorp, on the lands of the farm Rietvlei lies the former Bokoni capital Moxomatsi.

Archaeologists and historians have described the ruins as settlements of the baKoni people. Oral records and historical evidence trace the baKoni to at least the early 18th century. The ongoing 500 Year Initiative to rewrite South Africa's history continues to deliver new insights into the extent and complexity of these settlements. An international group of researchers have placed the baKoni settlements in the context of numerous other cases of agricultural intensification, that took place in the precolonial era in different parts of Africa.

== Infrastructure ==
=== Rail ===
This town has a railway station for the loading and unloading of passengers and cargo on the Pretoria–Maputo railway.

=== Roads ===
eNtokozweni lies just off the N4 between Mbombela to the east and eMalahleni to the west. It can be accessed from the N4 by turning off the R36 S to Carolina.

==== Tolling ====
The N4, managed by Trans African Concessions (TRAC), involves payment of toll: Motorists heading on the N4 E (the direction of Mbombela) and N4 W (the direction of eMalahleni) must pass through the Machado Toll Plaza, approximately 7 km north of eNtokozweni.
