= R569 (South Africa) =

Regional route in South Africa

Regional route R569

Route information
- Length: 7.2 km (4.5 mi)

Major junctions
- West end: R538 near Phola
- East end: Numbi Gate of the Kruger National Park

Location
- Country: South Africa

Highway system
- Numbered routes of South Africa
← R568	→ R570

The R569 is a Regional Route in South Africa.

== Route ==
Its western origin is the R538. It heads east for about 8 kilometres, ending at the Numbi Gate of the Kruger National Park.
