= Ottoshoop =

- Location within North West (South African province) Location within South Africa
- Coordinates: 25.7502°S 25.965°E
- Country: South Africa
- Province: North West
- District: Ngaka Modiri Molema
- Municipality: Mahikeng

Area
  - Total: 4.95 km^{2} (1.91 sq mi)
- Elevation: 1,417 m (4,649 ft)

Population (2011)
  - Total: 2,043
  - Density: 413/km^{2} (1,070/sq mi)

Racial makeup (2011)
  - Black African: 93.1%
  - Coloured: 1.4%
  - Indian/Asian: 0.6%
  - White: 4.8%

First languages (2011)
  - Tswana: 86.0%
  - Afrikaans: 6.1%
  - English: 2.4%
  - Zulu: 2.4%
  - Other: 3.1%
- Time zone: UTC+2 (SAST)
- PO box: 2866
- Area code: 018

Ottoshoop is one of the small towns in the Mahikeng Local Municipality in the North West Province of South Africa, situated 20km from the city of Mahikeng on the way to the town of Zeerust. Residents serve the scanty needs of a few locals, underwater divers and railway users. During the town's boom years from 1879 to 1880, Ottoshoop was, however, the commercial capital of South Africa. This spirit of the town still lives on in today's commercial capital of Africa – Johannesburg. Before the Europeans' arrival in mid-1800, the area was populated by the baRalong tribe, who built extensive walls to steer game into traps.

== Historic places ==
Mzilikazi's Wall is a stone wall measuring some 1000 metres which was built by renegade Zulu general Mzilikazi in the 1830s along the Molemane River to act as a 'hopo' or animal trap.

Mosega was general Mzilikazi's military headquarters during the battle of Mosega on 17 January 1837.

Gopane (Mabotsa) was David Livingston's first mission station 1834–1846. There is a stone monument and ruins.

Molemane Farmhouse was owned by a former lawyer turned farmer and amateur historian, John Gaspard Gubbins (1877–1935), who named the farm after the original seTswana name of the area, "Molemane", which means "place of much water". The farmhouse contains the Gubbins Africana collection, parts of which formed the basis for the Africana collection at the University of Witwatersrand.

Molemane Store Ruins was where the men who arrived from Pitsane and (then named) Mafeking gathered before setting off on the ill-fated Jameson Raid, a prelude to the Anglo Boer War in which the disenfranchised English mining magnates, including Cecil John Rhodes tried to overthrow the government of the Transvaal Republic under President Paul Kruger.

Old Water Mill, The oldest water mill from the Old Transvaal is restored and in working condition.

Stinkhoutboom farm was where a young Irish ship-jumper-turned-farmer, M.J. Kelly, discovered gold in 1879. Kelly's discovery led to the first gold fields in South Africa, which President Paul Kruger visited under the guidance of the local magistrate, a Mr Otto. Otto reportedly said he hoped the gold fields would turn Melemani into a large town, upon which President Kruger was said to answer: "good, then we shall call it Ottoshoop".

== Boom years ==
Word of Kelly's find spread and soon thousands of immigrants arrived through the veld, some pushing their wheelbarrows for more than 1,400 km through the untamed African veld from Cape Town, Ottoshoop then proceeded to play host to the biggest claim-staking race in South Africa's mining history. Legends differ, but some have it that more than 100,000 men lined up in the flat, arid scrubland that characterizes this part of the North West province, each clutching a sharpened plank with a number painted on it with which to stake his personal little el Dorado, or claim.

Such was the gold fever at the time and so many were the punters hoping to strike it rich that Ottoshoop had seven flourishing honky-tonk hotels on Commissioner, its main street. To house all the miners, shopkeepers and their families, magistrate Otto commissioned surveyor Gilfallen to plan a proper town. They chose as street names for the centre of town Commissioner-, Myn-, Pretorius-, Market- and Church street, with Commissioner street being the route to Johannesburg. All the plots were sold within a few months.

Then irony struck: in this dry, arid scrub-land that borders the Kalahari desert, Otto's hope literally drowned in water. As the original seTswana name hinted, the town sat on top of what some old-timers describe as an underground river that is 25 kilometres wide in parts. During the summer rain season, the water level rose to fill every the mine shaft and pit with water faster than it could be pumped with the biggest pumps money could buy – then and now.

Otto's hope lives on as Johannesburg

After news of large finds of gold in Barberton’s Sheba Mine and in Witwatersrand was circulated, most of the miners left Ottoshoop. With their tents and mining gear on ox carts, these miners helped in the development of Barberton and Johannesburg.

As more and more prospectors arrived, a vast tented city burgeoned along the main reef of the Witwatersrand. Rising levels of crime and disease called for a town to be built quickly, and the pragmatic government decided to dust off Gilfallen's plans for Ottoshoop's to use as the blueprint for Johannesburg. They decreed only one small change to the plans: with no love lost between the taciturn President Kruger's government and the immigrants, the President instructed that the town's blocks must be made shorter in order to create more street-corner shops, which could be taxed, as recorded by T. V. Bulpin in Storm Over The Transvaal (1955).

== Modern activities ==
Wondergat for top dive training

Ottoshoop is the last town to restock before camping at the Wondergat, a large dolomite sinkhole that forms the deepest natural hole in southern Africa. Dive schools used it to train advanced scuba diving as well as instructors and technical divers. Veteran drivers boast that "you haven't dived until you've dived at Wondergat" and punt it as South Africa's best inland dive site. The sinkhole has never been dry in the local tribe's oral history.

Digging for bottles

The rubbish tip created by what is claimed to have been 100,000 miners has left a legacy of rare glass bottles which is still mined by locals in Ottoshoop. Bottle mining enjoyed its hey-day in the 1980s but as a rare bottle fetches several hundred US dollars on eBay, a few Ottoshoop residents still experience a glimmer of the gold fever that spurred so many people into digging for treasure from 1879 to 1945.
