= Balmoral, South Africa =

Balmoral
- Location within Mpumalanga Location within South Africa
- Coordinates: 25.861°S 28.977°E
- Country: South Africa
- Province: Mpumalanga
- District: Nkangala
- Municipality: Emalahleni
- Established: 1894
- Time zone: UTC+2 (SAST)
- PO box: 1037
- Area code: 013

Balmoral is a town in the Emalahleni Local Municipality in the Mpumalanga province of South Africa. The village was established as a railway station of the Oosterlijn from Pretoria to Maputo in 1894. The village and railway station were erected at the farm Eenzaamheid. For decades the village was nothing more than a railway stop with a primary school for the surrounding farms. During the Second Boer War, the British built a concentration camp near the railway station.

== Development plans ==
In 1997, several Afrikaner businessmen, including the chairman of the Boere-Republiek Koöperatief Beperk (Boers Republic Co-operative Limited), Fritz Meyer, bought three parts of the farm Eenzaamheid outside the village. Intended as a self-declared homeland for white Afrikaners, it was reputed to have been financed by American white supremacist politician David Duke. Prominent right-winger Willem Ratte owns a farm in Balmoral.

In May 2012 the Boere-Republiek Koöperatief Beperk (Boers Republic Co-operative Limited) was re-registered as Balmoral Vestigings Koöperatief Beperk (BVKB). The objective of the Co-operative is in line with Clause 3 of 19 of the Co-operative Act, 2005.

=== Graveyard and museum ===
The graveyard of the Balmoral concentration camp, dating back to the Second Boer War, lies at the property of the BVKB. In 1997 the BVKB-residents established the "Volksmoord Museum of Boer Genocide" next to the graveyard of the Balmoral concentration camp and petitioned the British High Commission in Pretoria for an apology for the concentration camp deaths.

In 2013, Willem Ratte removed his belongings from the museum, which decayed and repeatedly was vandalized. Later, Ratte refused to recollect its belongings from the place where he had stored them. In 2016, the empty and decayed museum burned down in a field fire.

In 2016, the BVKB sold the graveyard and the ruins of the museum to a new owner.

== See also ==
- Orania
- Kleinfontein
