= Modderspruit =

- Location within North West (South African province) Location within South Africa
- Coordinates: 25.722°S 27.656°E
- Country: South Africa
- Province: North West
- District: Bojanala Platinum
- Municipality: Madibeng

Area
  - Total: 4.68 km^{2} (1.81 sq mi)

Population (2011)
  - Total: 16,851
  - Density: 3,600/km^{2} (9,330/sq mi)

Racial makeup (2011)
  - Black African: 98.7%
  - Coloured: 0.5%
  - Indian/Asian: 0.4%
  - White: 0.2%
  - Other: 0.2%

First languages (2011)
  - Tswana: 56.5%
  - Tsonga: 11.1%
  - Xhosa: 7.8%
  - Zulu: 5.7%
  - Other: 18.9%
- Time zone: UTC+2 (SAST)
- PO box: 0274

Modderspruit is a town in Bojanala District Municipality in the North West province of South Africa.
