= Broederstroom =

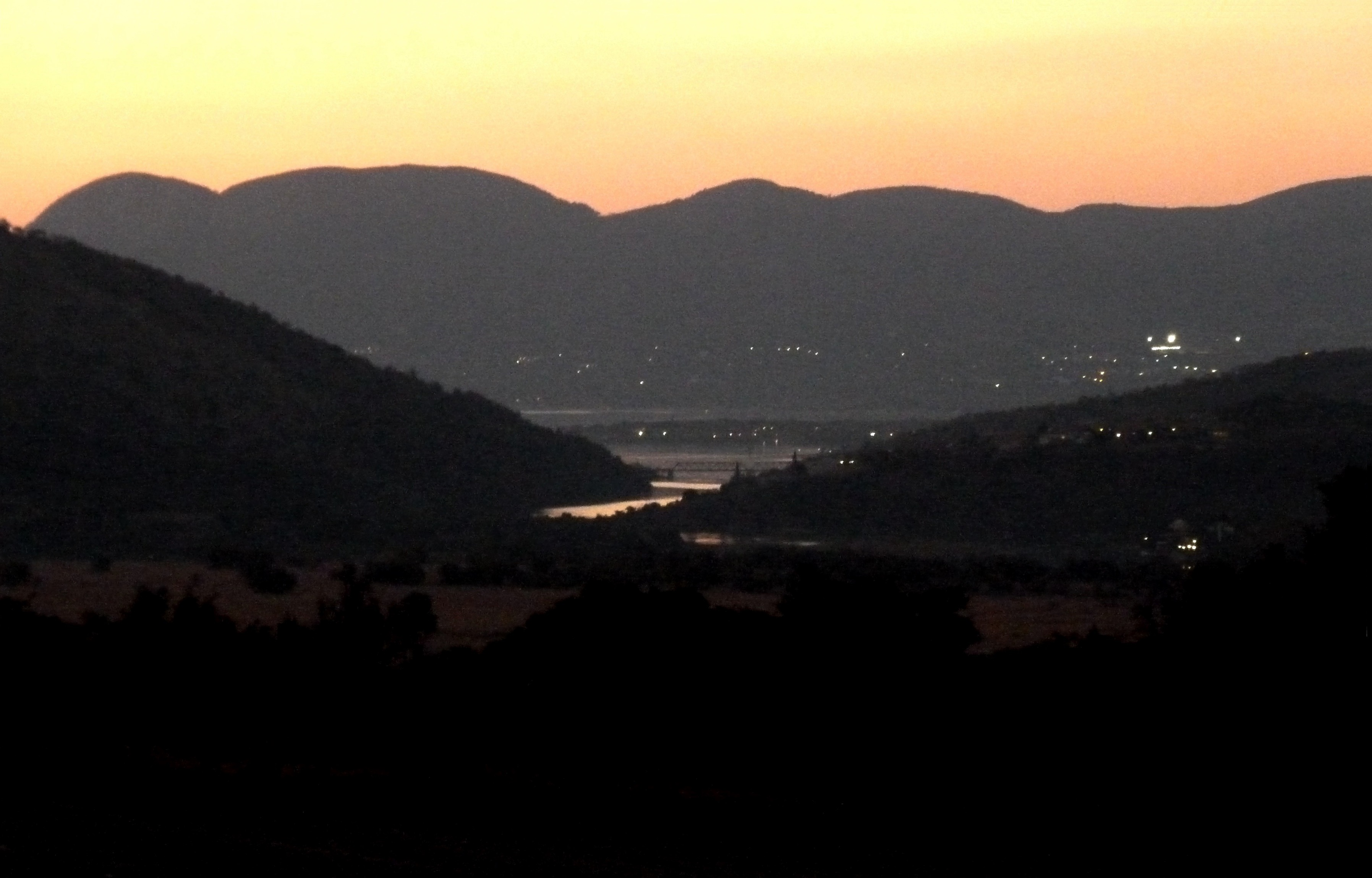
- Dusk near Broederstroom, a section of the Crocodile River

- Location within North West (South African province) Location within South Africa
- Coordinates: 25°48′49″S 27°52′17″E
- Country: South Africa
- Province: North West
- District: Bojanala Platinum
- Municipality: Madibeng
- Time zone: UTC+2 (SAST)
- PO box: 0240
- Area code: 012

Broederstroom is a village situated beside the R512 road on the Daspoortrand (former Pretoria district) in the Witwatersrand, the southern foothills of the Magaliesberg in North West Province, South Africa. It grew from a Voortrekker settlement which was established in the wake of Mzilikazi's depopulation of the region during the mfecane. Various small to medium-sized businesses, overnight facilities, farm houses and informal settlements are located beside or just off the R512 on the western bank of the Crocodile River. The loose aggregation of residences and businesses are bisected by Jalalpor road running west to east, and Bart Pretorius road running south to north. The sprawling Pecanwood Golf Estate is some 4 km to the north, on the shore of the Hartbeespoort Dam.

== History ==
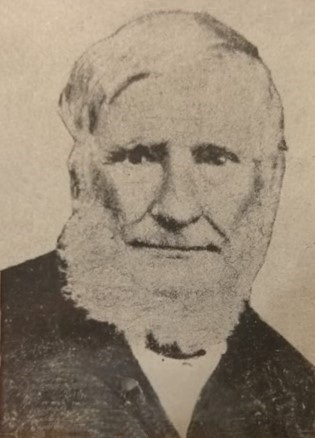
Bart Pretorius, younger brother of Andries Pretorius

Early Iron Age farmers were present here from the 6th century onwards, and the BaFokeng dominated the landscape from the start of 16th century. They suffered greatly during the mfecane of the 19th century, and the Voortrekkers entered the area immediately afterwards. The village is named after three brothers of General Andries Pretorius, namely Piet (H.P.N.), Bart (H.A.) and Wynand Pretorius, who established themselves here in the mid 19th century; the name is derived from Dutch broeder, meaning 'brother' and stroom, meaning 'stream'. Bart Pretorius built a house here around 1845. Andries Pretorius joined his younger brothers here in 1848, and his son M.W. Pretorius was likewise a resident. Well-known Afrikaans writer Sangiro was born in Broederstroom in 1894, and starting 1924, Afrikaner historian and language activist Gustav Preller visited the area, and eventually established him at nearby Pelindaba. Preller in turn was regularly paid visits by Eugène Marais, besides various artists and intellectuals.

== Pelindaba ==
Pelindaba is located some 5km east of Broederstroom, and houses two nuclear reactors for research purposes. Pelindaba is the southern section of former Welgegund farm, acquired from the state by Swart Martiens Pretorius before the end of the 19th century. The western section of Pelindaba, accessed via gate 3, is a conserved area which includes Preller's House, a National Monument since 1973. The Phalandingwe hiking trail starts at the house, follows the Crocodile River, and passes the historic grave yard.

== Lion Park ==
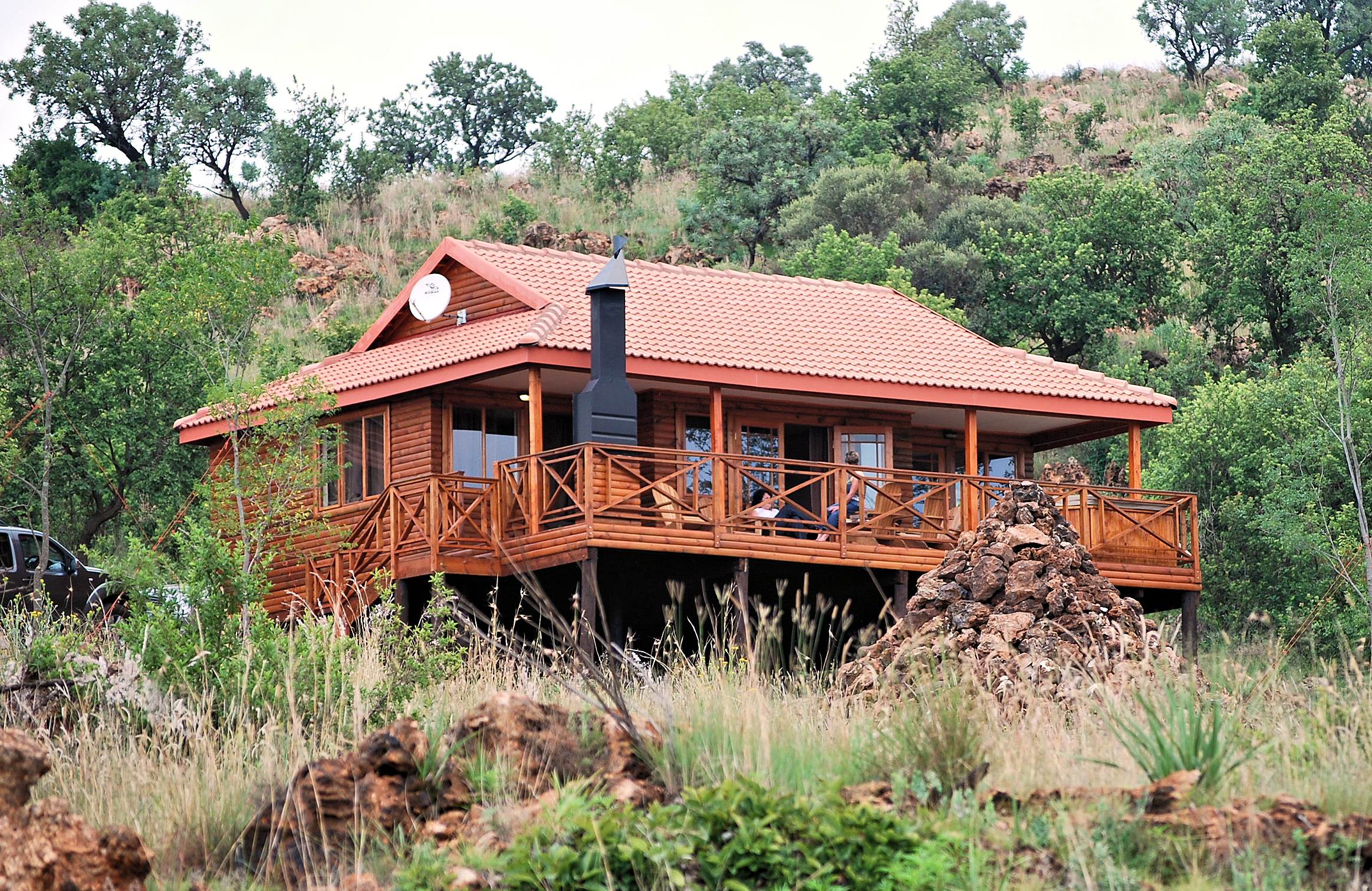
A log cabin in the Lion Park

The Lion Park was founded by the Chipperfields Circus in November, 1966. Located in the Gauteng-Tshwane complex, the climate is perfect for highveld fauna and the native animals found in this park. The Park is split into two areas. Herbivores and carnivores are separated and herbivores such as zebra, giraffe and other antelope are available for close-up viewing. The carnivores include three prides of lion and one clan of hyena. They are surrounded by barriers and fences to protect each pride from one another. Lions are extremely territorial and will attack if intruders enter their terrain. The lions housed here are indigenous to Mozambique, Zimbabwe, Limpopo, and Botswana. The Lion park is open all year from 08:30 to 17:00.
