= Ngodwana =

- Location within Mpumalanga Location within South Africa
- Coordinates: 25.569°S 30.678°E
- Country: South Africa
- Province: Mpumalanga
- District: Ehlanzeni
- Municipality: Mbombela

Area
  - Total: 12.20 km^{2} (4.71 sq mi)

Population (2011)
  - Total: 3,483
  - Density: 285.5/km^{2} (739.4/sq mi)

Racial makeup (2011)
  - Black African: 60.2%
  - Coloured: 1.7%
  - Indian/Asian: 1.2%
  - White: 36.7%
  - Other: 0.2%

First languages (2011)
  - Swazi: 35.0%
  - Afrikaans: 32.1%
  - English: 9.7%
  - Tsonga: 7.8%
  - Other: 15.4%
- Time zone: UTC+2 (SAST)
- PO box: 1209
- Area code: 013

Ngodwana is a town in Ehlanzeni District Municipality in the Mpumalanga province of South Africa.

The town is known for the large Sappi Ngodwana Mill, a major producer of paper pulp and paper products from forestry in the wider region.

The town is located within Legogote Sour Bushveld and has a high diversity of indigenous plants.

The Elands River flows through the Ngodwana valley.

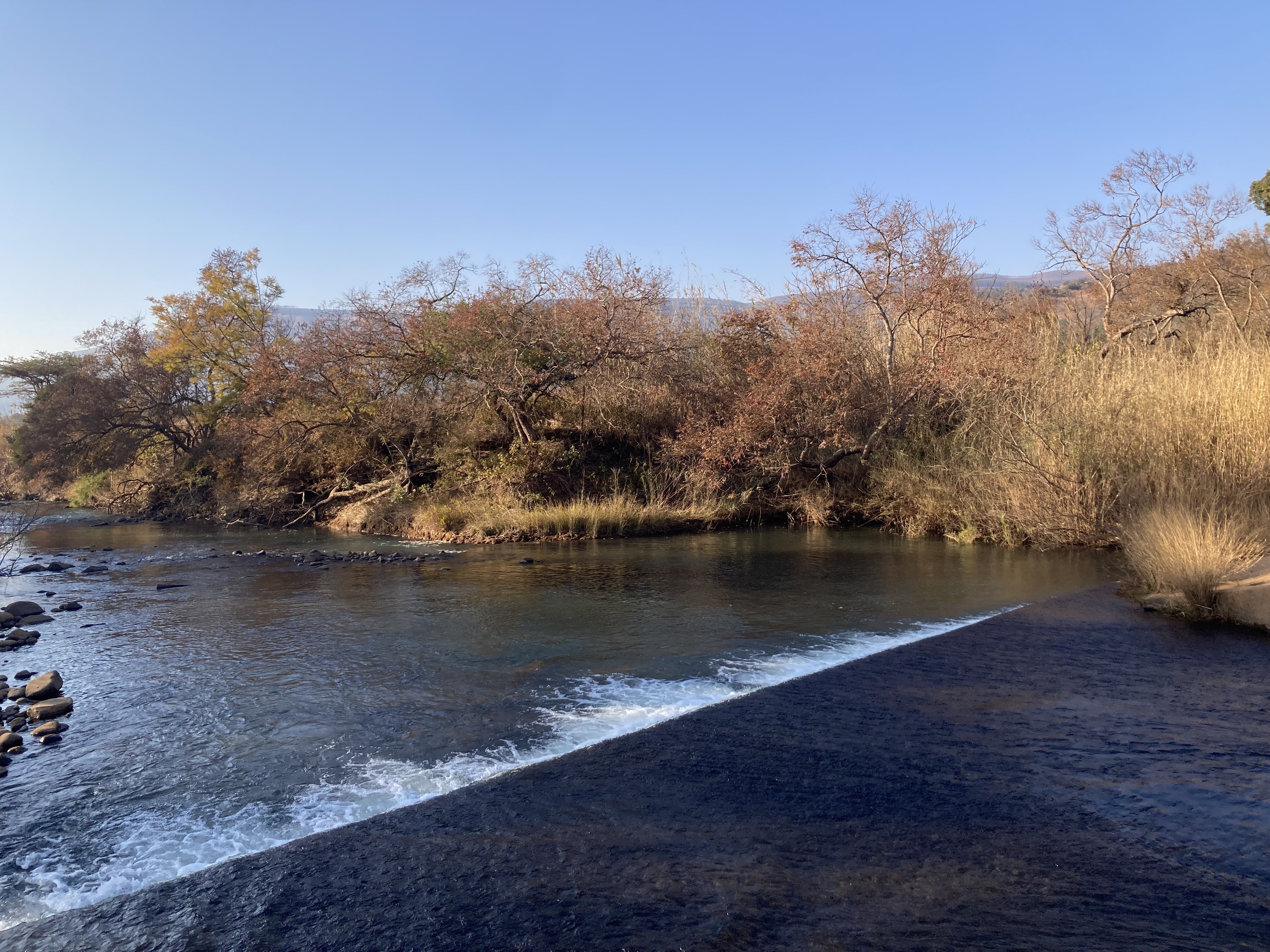
Elands River near Ngodwana

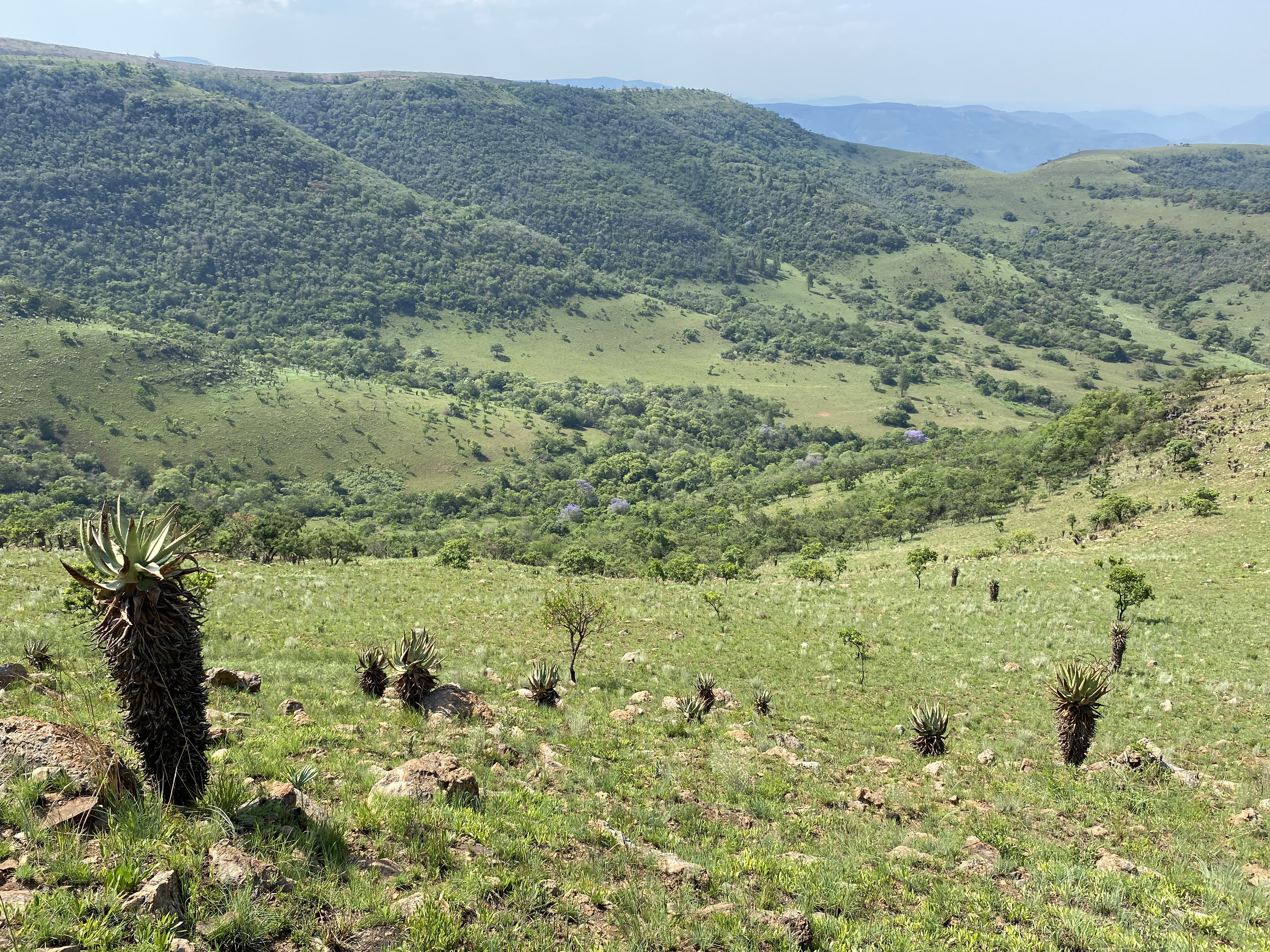
Veld near Ngodwana
