= Maputo Corridor =

The Maputo Corridor is a major trade corridor which connects the Gauteng, Limpopo, and Mpumalanga provinces of South Africa with Maputo, which is a port and the capital of Mozambique.

The corridor comprises roads - including the N4 toll road (from Pretoria to Komatipoort) - and railways, ports, and border facilities at Komatipoort, which connect the industrial areas around Gauteng, and mines and agricultural districts to the east, with ports on the Mozambique coast. Maputo and Matola are both deepwater ports.

Transport organisations and border control agencies are cooperating to improve transport and lower barriers to trade.

== History ==
The corridor was first planned in 1994, as a rehabilitation project for disused transport links. Since then, the project has broadened, new parties have become involved, and over $5 billion invested.

=== Rail Participants ===
- Caminhos de ferro do Moçambique
- The government of Eswatini has also joined the project.
- Transnet Freight Rail is a stakeholder, but has been criticised by other stakeholders and is reluctant to invest in the project.

== Road ==
Trans African Concessions manages the toll road from Pretoria to Maputo, inclusive of the N4 route (South African section from Pretoria via Witbank and Mbombela to Komatipoort; 405 km) and the EN4 route (Mozambican section from Ressano Garcia to Maputo; 90 km). They entered into a 30-year concession for the road with both governments in 1997.
