= Platinum Highway =

Road in South Africa

The Platinum Highway is part of the N4 route, and a major South African highway built under concessions with a private contractor. In 2001, the project was voted Infrastructure Deal of the Year by Project Finance International Magazine. It took eight years to complete. The highway is part of the Trans-Kalahari Corridor, which links Pretoria with Namibia via Botswana. The contract had tougher concession terms than were seen in previous contracts.

The Platinum Highway is the section of the N4 from the Skilpadshek Border with Botswana, through Zeerust, Swartruggens, Rustenburg and Brits, to the interchange with the N1 in Pretoria (Tshwane). The concessionaire responsible for this road is Bakwena and the entire route is a toll road. There are 4 tollgates on the route (one west of Swartruggens; one east of Rustenburg; one east of Brits; one at the N1 interchange).

== Background and developments ==
The Platinum Highway toll route is currently operated by the Bakwena consortium under license from the South African National Roads Agency Limited (SANRAL). They operate the sections of the N4 from the Doornpoort Interchange with the N1 in Pretoria to the Skilpadshek border with Botswana, amounting to 295 kilometres. In addition, they operate the section of the N1 from the Proefplaas Interchange in Pretoria to the R516 off-ramp near Bela-Bela, amounting to 90 kilometres.

Bakwena entered into this 30-year toll concession with SANRAL in October 2000, with the contract commencing on 28 August 2001.

Some of the projects done by Bakwena on the Platinum Highway include transforming the 31 km section of the freeway from the Buffelspoort interchange (east of the Marikana Toll Plaza) to the R512 Brits interchange into a dual carriageway from 2009 up to November 2014 and transforming the 32 km section of the freeway from the M17 off-ramp near Ga-Rankuwa up to the R512 Brits interchange into a dual carriageway from March 2018 to October 2021.

There is currently construction of a second carriageway on the Platinum Highway from the R52 intersection just west of Rustenburg to the Buffelspoort interchange after the Marikana Toll Plaza (due for completion in 2028), which will make the entire freeway from Rustenburg to Pretoria into a dual-carriageway freeway once completed.

== See also ==
- N4 (South Africa)
