= Brits, South Africa =

Brits
- Town
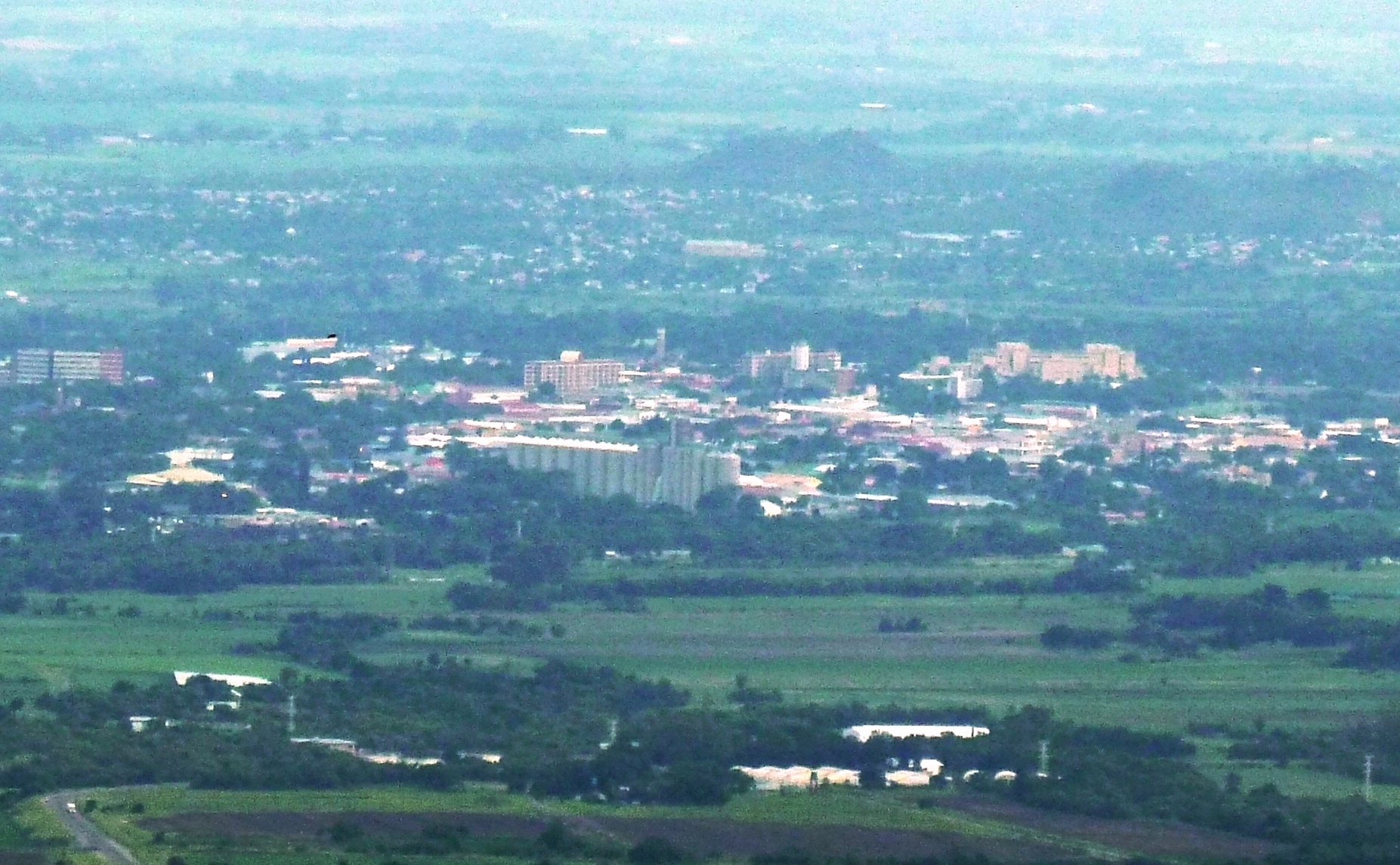
- Brits as seen from Dewetsnek in the Magaliesberg

- Location within North West (South African province) Location within South Africa Location within Africa
- Coordinates: 25°38′4″S 27°46′52″E
- Country: South Africa
- Province: North West
- District: Bojanala
- Municipality: Madibeng

Area
  - Total: 114.7 km^{2} (44.3 sq mi)

Population (2011)
  - Total: 53,511
  - Density: 466.5/km^{2} (1,208/sq mi)

Racial makeup (2011)
  - African: 41.1%
  - White: 46.6%
  - Indian/Asian: 5.5%
  - Other: 0.9% Coloured

First languages (2011)
  - Tswana: 28.6%
  - Afrikaans: 25.9%
  - Northern Sotho: 10.1%
  - Xhosa: 10.1%
  - Other: 25.3%
- Time zone: UTC+2 (SAST)
- Postal code (street): 0250
- PO box: 0250
- Area code: 012

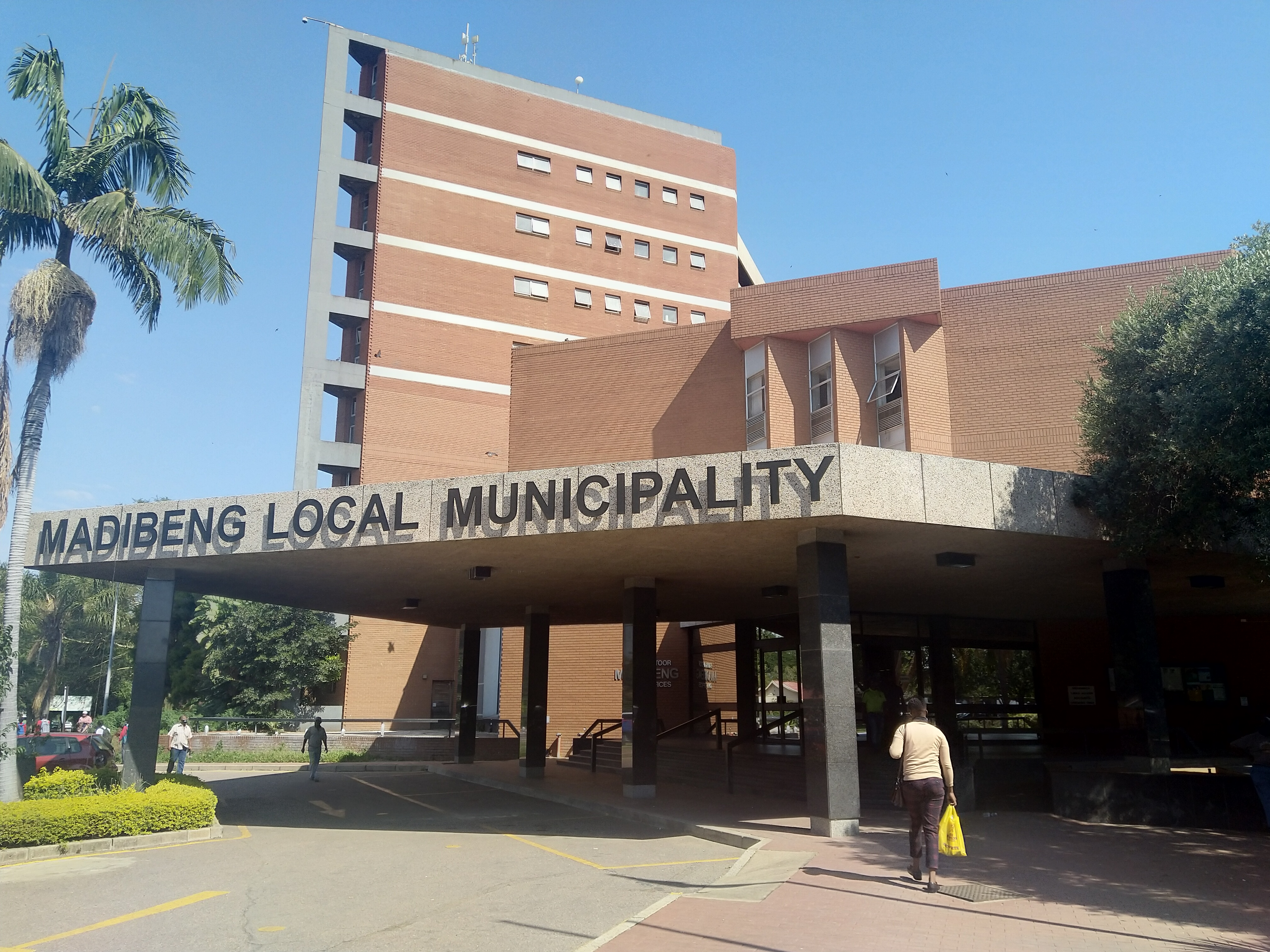
Madibeng Local Municipality - Brits, North West

Brits (/brəts/) is a town in the North West Province of South Africa. It is situated in a fertile citrus, vegetable and grain-producing area that is irrigated by the waters of the Hartbeespoort Dam. It is close to the City of Tshwane Metropolitan Municipality in Gauteng, which includes Pretoria, and it has the same dialling code as Pretoria. In addition to being a centre for agriculture, the city is home to several heavy industries.The city also plays an important role in the South African mining industry: 94% of South Africa's platinum comes from the Rustenburg and Brits districts, which together produce more platinum than any other single area in the world. In addition, there is a large vanadium mine in the district.

Mothotlung, Letlhabile, Maboloka, Bapong, Majakaneng, Tornado, Bethanie and Oukasie are the black townships, with Oukasie founded in 1931 being one of the oldest townships in South Africa.The Indian area in Brits is Primindia. Brits is part of the Madibeng Local Municipality.

Brits is linked to Sandton by the R511 and to Randburg by the R512, and to Pretoria by the R513, R514 & R566. Freeway access is by the N4 Highway (Bakwena Toll Route), which was constructed in the early 2000s.

== History ==
The first European to build a pioneer hut in the area was Albertus Venter circa 1840. He settled down with his wife and daughter on the farm which is today known as De Kroon and started farming. The Fourie family soon joined him and on 13 June 1846 the first white baby was born in this area north of the Magaliesberg. Phillipus Fourie eventually bought the farm from Venter and he put up the first permanent homestead that became known as the "Ou Werf".

The railway station called Brits was opened on 9 July 1906 and residents began putting up small businesses on the southern side of it. The station was built on the property of Johan Nicolaas Brits that owned part of the farm Roodekopjes. He was previously the first owner of the farm Bloemfontein which he sold to major Henry Douglas Warden. In 1918 a steam driven roller mill was built west of the station and served the farming community for many decades. Mail now arrived by train and it became the station master's job to sort out the people's mail. The first post office was built on the station in 1915, and the first postmaster was Haydon Thomas. It was in this little building that the first telephone was installed; it was operated by a Miss Theron. The first police station was established in 1921, with a Sergeant Prinsloo its first station commander.

A little village began to develop around the main road on the southern side of the station, which later became known as Tom Street. Unfortunately, no proper city planning was done, and this area had no access to running water. A businessman by the name of Louis Karovsky, bought the part of Hendrik Christiaan Brits' farm to the north of the rail road. This section was cut up into 940 stands and legally proclaimed as a township in October 1923. The area south of the railway station eventually become the Indian area of Primindia, with Tom Street as its primary business node. Brits was founded in 1924 on the farm Roode Kopjes (Red Hills) and was named after the owner, Johannes Nicolaas Brits. The armistice treaty for the Transvaal civil war was signed in 1864 beneath a karee tree just to the south of Brits. A speech by General Hertzog in 1912 at the nearby De Wildt railway station led to the formation of the National Party.

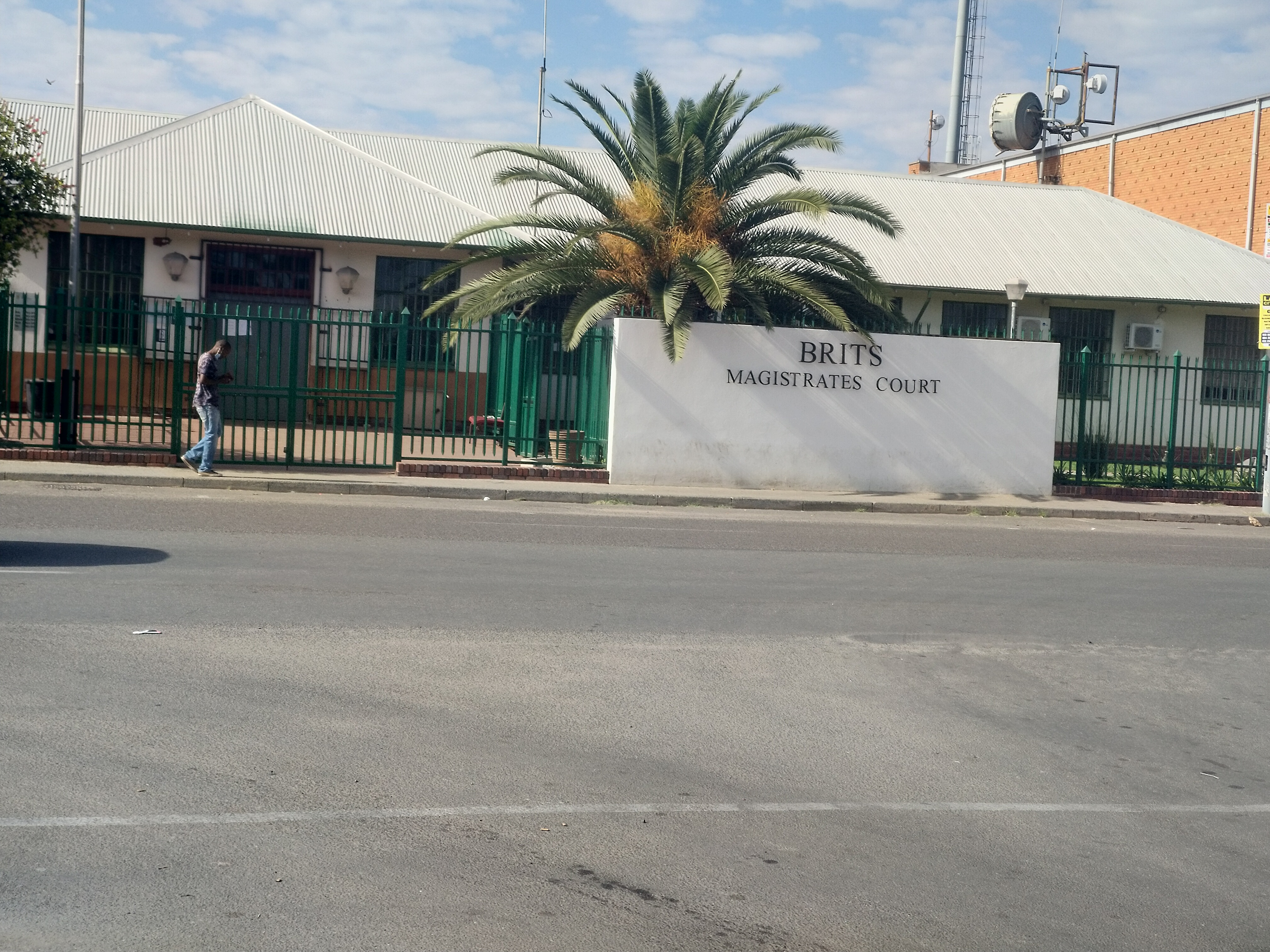
Brits Magistrate Court

== Animals ==
The De Wildt Cheetah and Wildlife Centre, renowned for its success in breeding and studying cheetah, king cheetah, brown hyena, suni, blue duiker and wild dogs is situated in the small town of De Wildt, just east of Brits.

Ukutula Lodge and conservation center is also based in Brits. Ukutula is home to a number of wild cat species and is a registered Wildlife Breeding and trading facility, as well as an animal rescue center.

Brits is also the birthplace of the first cloned animal in Africa, a cow.

== Transport ==
Brits Airfield is located a few miles north of the city. Communities from surrounding villages and townships make use of taxis, buses, private cars as well as bicycles as modes of transport to move from one point to another.

== Notable people ==
- Katlego Mphela (born 1984), footballer
- Bobby van Jaarsveld, singer and actor
- Corrie Sanders, boxer, former world champion
