= Witbank =

- City
- eMalahleni
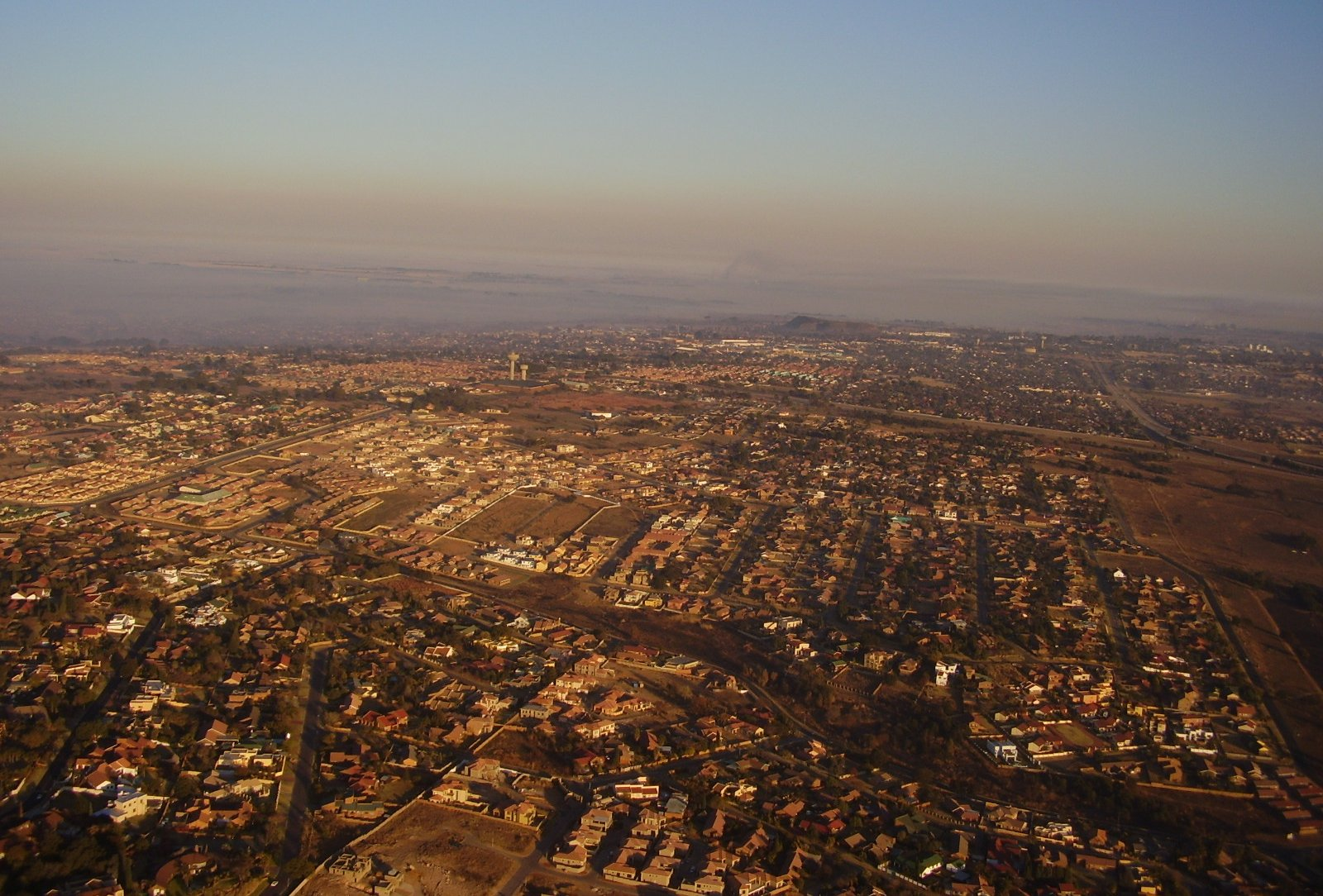
- Aerial view over the suburbs

- Location within Mpumalanga Location within South Africa Location within Africa
- Coordinates: 25.877°S 29.201°E
- Country: South Africa
- Province: Mpumalanga
- District: Nkangala
- Municipality: Emalahleni
- Established: 1890

Area
  - Total: 164.27 km^{2} (63.43 sq mi)

Population (2011)
  - Total: 108,673
  - Density: 661.55/km^{2} (1,713.4/sq mi)

Racial makeup (2011)
  - Black African: 48.1%
  - Coloured: 2.0%
  - Indian/Asian: 2.5%
  - White: 46.8%
  - Other: 0.6%

First languages (2011)
  - Afrikaans: 42.4%
  - Zulu: 17.6%
  - English: 13.7%
  - Northern Sotho: 7.6%
  - Other: 18.7%
- Time zone: UTC+2 (SAST)
- Postal code (street): 1035
- Area code: 013

Witbank (/wətbænk/), officially eMalahleni, is a city located on the Highveld of Mpumalanga, South Africa, within the Emalahleni Local Municipality. The name Witbank is Afrikaans for "white ridge", and is named after a white sandstone outcrop where wagon transport drivers rested. The city is known for its coal-mining in the surrounding region.

Witbank, which was founded in 1890, was renamed to eMalahleni meaning the place of coal in 2006 by the government of Mpumalanga, matching the municipality. Both names are used.

== History ==
Witbank was founded in 1890 and early attempts to exploit the coal deposits failed until the railway from Pretoria reached the area in 1894. It was proclaimed a town in 1903 and became a municipality in 1914.

There are many stories about the city and its origination but the top story would be the arrival of Winston Churchill at the nearby Transvaal and Delagoa Bay Colliery during his escape from Boer imprisonment in Pretoria, on his way to Delagoa Bay (later Lourenço Marques, and then Maputo, in Mozambique).

Some local residents, loyal to the Crown, assisted him in hiding and making the final leg of his escape, thus gaining Witbank the consequent credit once the details of these events could be made known. The town has grown since then from a farming community into a business destination where companies such as Anglo American, BHP, Evraz, Eskom, Exxaro, Komatsu, the Renova Group, SABMiller, and Xstrata, among many others have found substantial returns on their investments.

=== Name change ===
On 3 March 2006, Witbank was officially renamed to eMalahleni, meaning place of coal matching the name of the municipality that contains it. A large number of signs to the town have already changed, but many still remain. Some landmarks bearing the name Witbank have remained, while others (such as the Witbank/eMalahleni dam) have been renamed.

Despite attempts by governing bodies to establish the use of the name, Emalahleni, for the city as well as for the district, locals still tend to call the city by its original name. Similarly to the anglicised pronunciation of Johannesburg, English-speaking residents pronounce the name as “wit•bank” and not as “vit•bunk” as in the original Afrikaans pronunciation, nor as “vit•bank” as English-speaking visitors are prone to say.

== Climate ==
Climate data for Witbank (1994–2006)
Month	Jan	Feb	Mar	Apr	May	Jun	Jul	Aug	Sep	Oct	Nov	Dec	Year
Mean daily maximum °C (°F)	26.0 (78.8)	26.1 (79.0)	24.9 (76.8)	23.0 (73.4)	20.3 (68.5)	18.5 (65.3)	18.2 (64.8)	21.1 (70.0)	24.2 (75.6)	25.4 (77.7)	25.3 (77.5)	25.9 (78.6)	23.2 (73.8)
Mean daily minimum °C (°F)	15.1 (59.2)	14.9 (58.8)	13.5 (56.3)	10.6 (51.1)	7.0 (44.6)	4.8 (40.6)	4.0 (39.2)	6.5 (43.7)	9.4 (48.9)	11.9 (53.4)	13.4 (56.1)	14.5 (58.1)	10.5 (50.8)
Average rainfall mm (inches)	144 (5.7)	93 (3.7)	79 (3.1)	33 (1.3)	18 (0.7)	4 (0.2)	2 (0.1)	7 (0.3)	10 (0.4)	69 (2.7)	98 (3.9)	127 (5.0)	684 (27.1)
Average rainy days (≥ 0.1 mm)	13.2	11.2	9.5	5.4	2.7	1.8	0.7	2.2	2.4	8.5	11.5	14.1	83.2
Source: World Meteorological Organization

== Transport ==
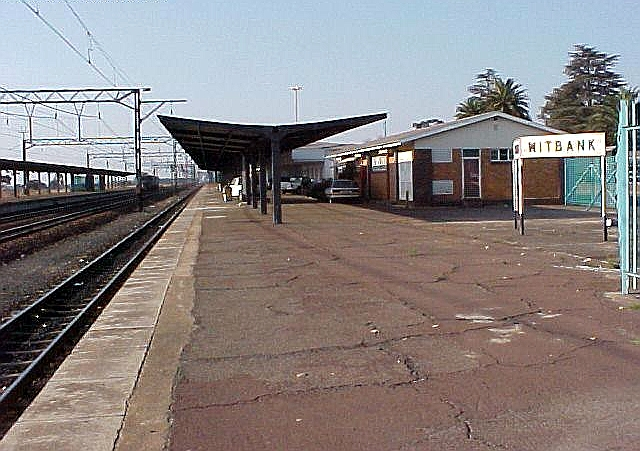
Witbank railway station

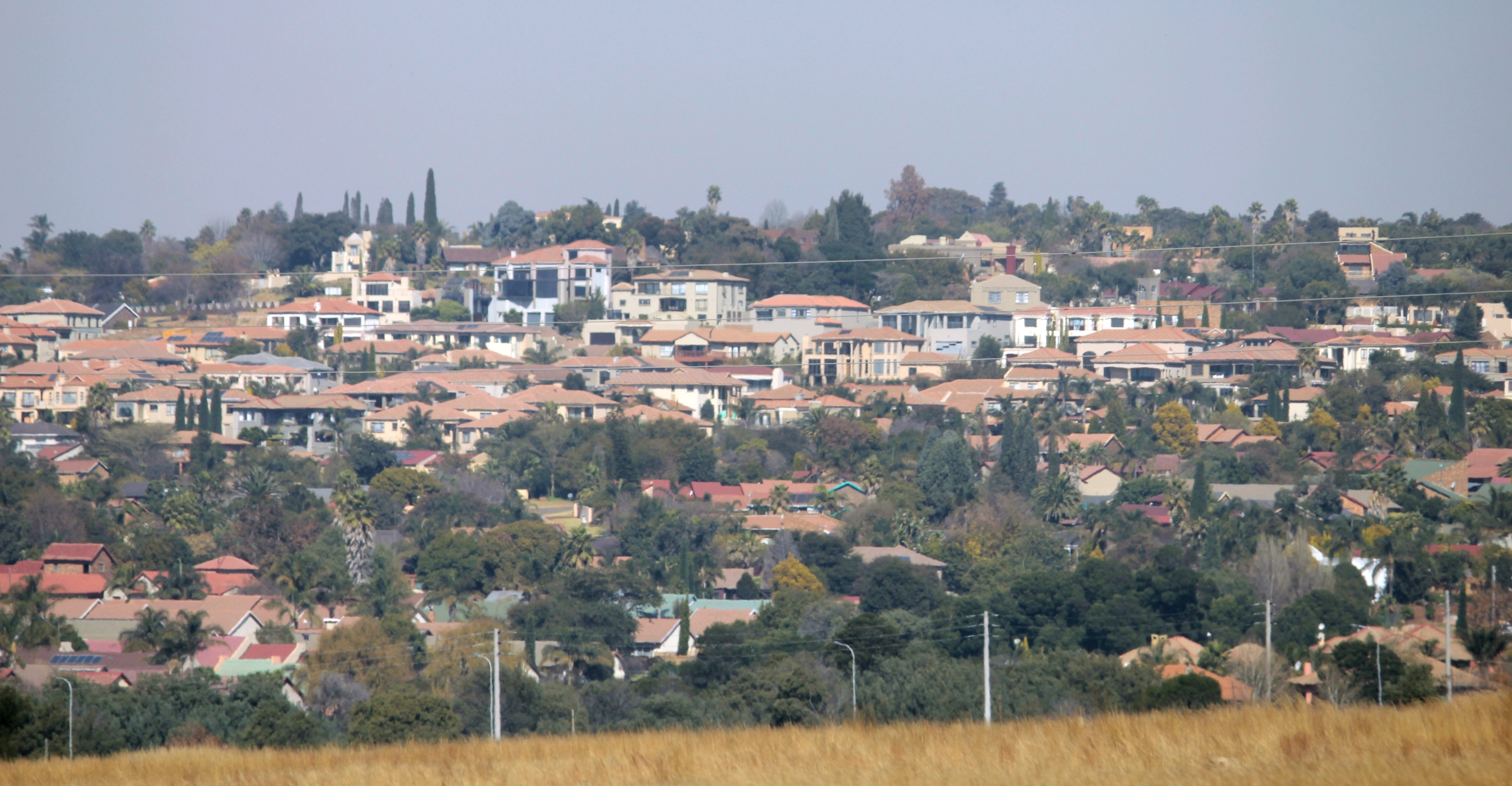
View of Reyno Ridge, a suburb in eastern Witbank

Witbank is located along the railway line linking Pretoria to Maputo and for many years served as the transport gateway to the Mozambiquean port. In recent years, this line has been under frequent threat of collapse due to underground coal fires in disused mines in the area.

Two national highways, the N4 from Pretoria and the N12 from Johannesburg, converge in eMalahleni and then continue to Mbombela and Komatipoort, on the border of Mozambique. Together, these routes form the Maputo Corridor, a strategically important alternative to the South African ports of Richards Bay and Durban on the Indian Ocean shores of the country.

== Economy ==
Witbank is in a coal mining area with more than 22 collieries in the municipal radius. There are a number of power stations (such as the Duvha Power Station), as well as a steel mill (Evraz Highveld Steel and Vanadium Limited) nearby which all require coal. The farm land surrounding Witbank is fast being bought by investors, coal mining companies and real estate developers to accommodate the rapid growth of the city which is good for local businesses and residents. The region has the dirtiest air in the world due to the coal mining and plant power stations.

Likewise, the sustained growth of the commercial areas and suburbs has presented significant challenges to the municipal government. Potable water supplies, sewage treatment, electricity distribution, refuse collection and road maintenance are particularly affected, arousing sustained ire amongst the local residents. Relatively high summer rainfall since 2008 has caused significant damage to municipal roads, creating large numbers of potholes and leaving large amounts of debris on the road surfaces.

== Demographics ==
The 2001 census found that Witbank had a population of 61,093, of which 50.6% were female and 49.4% male.

As of 2011 (Statistics South Africa) the city's population stood at 108,674 people.

=== Ethnic groups ===
According to the 2011 census the largest ethnic groups in Witbank were Black African at 48.1%, Whites at 46.8% and the remainder consisting of Coloureds (2.0%) and Asians (2.5%).

Ethnic groups in Witbank
Ethnic group	Percent
White	54.2%
Black	40.3%
Coloured	4.8%
Asian	0.7%

=== Language ===
Among the white population, Witbank (like the rest of Mpumalanga) is mainly Afrikaans speaking. The Black population speak mostly isiZulu, isiSwati, and isiNdebele, and Asians mostly English. According to the 2001 census the largest languages in Witbank were: Afrikaans (48.8%), Zulu (23.1%), English (11.7%), Northern Sotho (5.2%) and Swazi (3.0%).

Languages in Witbank
Language	Percent
Afrikaans	48.8%
Zulu	30.1%
English	11.7%
N. Sotho	5.2%
Swazi	3.0%
Ndebele	2.9%
S. Sotho	1.8%
Tsonga	1.0%
Xhosa	1.0%
Tswana	0.8%
Other	0.5%
Venda	0.2%

=== Communities ===
To the west of the city, two large communities, Vosman and Kwa-Guqa (“the Place of Kneeling” in Zulu), and two smaller communities, Lynnville, Ackerville and Schoongesicht, are home to approximately 440,000 (in 2005) residents, predominantly black. While many of these residents aspire to relocate to the more spacious suburbs around the city center, generally this has only been affordable to a few thousand, due to the prices of the suburban real estate. There are now communities on the northwest side of the city that have been established at Pine Ridge (consisting predominantly of Indian residents), Klarinet and Siyanqoba. Pressure to develop the city's suburbs has been exacerbated by the gradual de-population of the surrounding colliery villages as well as the continued development of new coal-fired power stations in the area.

== Tourism ==
As eMalahleni is en route to travellers from the Gauteng province to the Kruger National Park, attempts have been made to capture some of the potential tourist spend. Apart from a few hotels, there are many guest houses. These vary from the utilitarian to the luxurious, and also cater for many of the business travellers visiting eMalahleni as well as those travelling to Mbombela, eSwatini and Mozambique. A casino complex is accessible within a few hundred meters from the N4 highway, providing two hotels, cinemas, ten-pin bowling and restaurants as well as the traditional gambling facilities. The Highveld Mall is built immediately next to the casino and is a retail hub for locals as well as for many residents of towns in the vicinity.

== Notable people ==
- Kabza de Small, DJ and record producer
- Anneline Kriel, Miss World of 1974, was born and brought up in Witbank.
- Jackson Mthembu, South African politician born in Witbank
- Hugh Masekela, international jazz artist was born in Witbank.
- Lindiwe Ntshalintshali, MEC for the Mpumalanga Department of Culture, Sports and Recreation. Former Deputy President of the South African Local Government Association (SALGA)
- Francois Pienaar, Captain of 1995 Springbok rugby team who won the world cup.
- Percy Tau, (born 13 May 1994) in Witbank is a South African professional footballer
- Leon Labuschagne, para-Olympic gold medalist for discus and shotput
- Francois Botha, former professional boxer and kickboxer.

== Sport ==
Witbank was the home town of the Mpumalanga Black Aces who are dissolved football team and used to be the home town of the Pumas provincial rugby union which has since moved to Mbombela.

== See also ==
- Roman Catholic Diocese of Witbank
- Witbank Spurs F.C. – A football club based in Witbank
- Tshwane University of Technology - Witbank Campus (incl. Mabaleng Residence)
