= 1894 in South Africa =

- Decades: 1870s; 1880s; 1890s; 1900s; 1910s
- See also: List of years in South Africa

The following lists events that happened during 1894 in South Africa.

== Incumbents ==
- Governor of the Cape of Good Hope and High Commissioner for Southern Africa:Henry Brougham Loch.
- Governor of the Colony of Natal: Walter Hely-Hutchinson.
- State President of the Orange Free State: Francis William Reitz.
- State President of the South African Republic: Paul Kruger.
- Prime Minister of the Cape of Good Hope: Cecil John Rhodes.
- Prime Minister of the Colony of Natal: .

== Events ==
June

- 25 – Paul Kruger, President of the Transvaal Republic, meets British High Commissioner Sir Henry Loch in Pretoria to discuss the grievances of the Uitlanders.

August

- 22 – The Natal Indian Congress is founded by Mahatma Gandhi.

September

- Mahatma Gandhi becomes the first Indian to be enrolled as an Advocate of the Supreme Court of Natal.

October

- 1 – The Owl Club of Cape Town, a dining club, has its first formal meeting.
- 20 – The railway line between Lourenço Marques and Pretoria is completed at Balmoral.

November

- 18 – The railway line between Lourenço Marques and Pretoria is opened to traffic.

Unknown date

- The Glen Grey Act is passed in the Cape of Good Hope to control African labour and land.

== Births ==
- 12 March – Willem Lambertus van Warmelo, compiler of Afrikaanse Liedjies, born in the Netherlands. (d. 1976)
- 20 March – Jan Hofmeyr, Prime Minister of South Africa. (d. 1948)
- 1 May – Elizabeth Johanna Bosman, author under the pen name Marie Linde (d. 1963)
- 23 August – Andries Albertus Pienaar, author under the pen name Sangiro, born in Broederstroom. (d. 1979)
- 5 October – Bevil Rudd, South African athlete. (d. 1948)

== Railways ==
=== Railway lines opened ===
- 3 October – Cape Western – Vryburg to Mafeking, 96 miles (154.5 kilometres).
- 18 November – Transvaal – Airlie to Pretoria, 179 miles (288.1 kilometres).

=== Locomotives ===
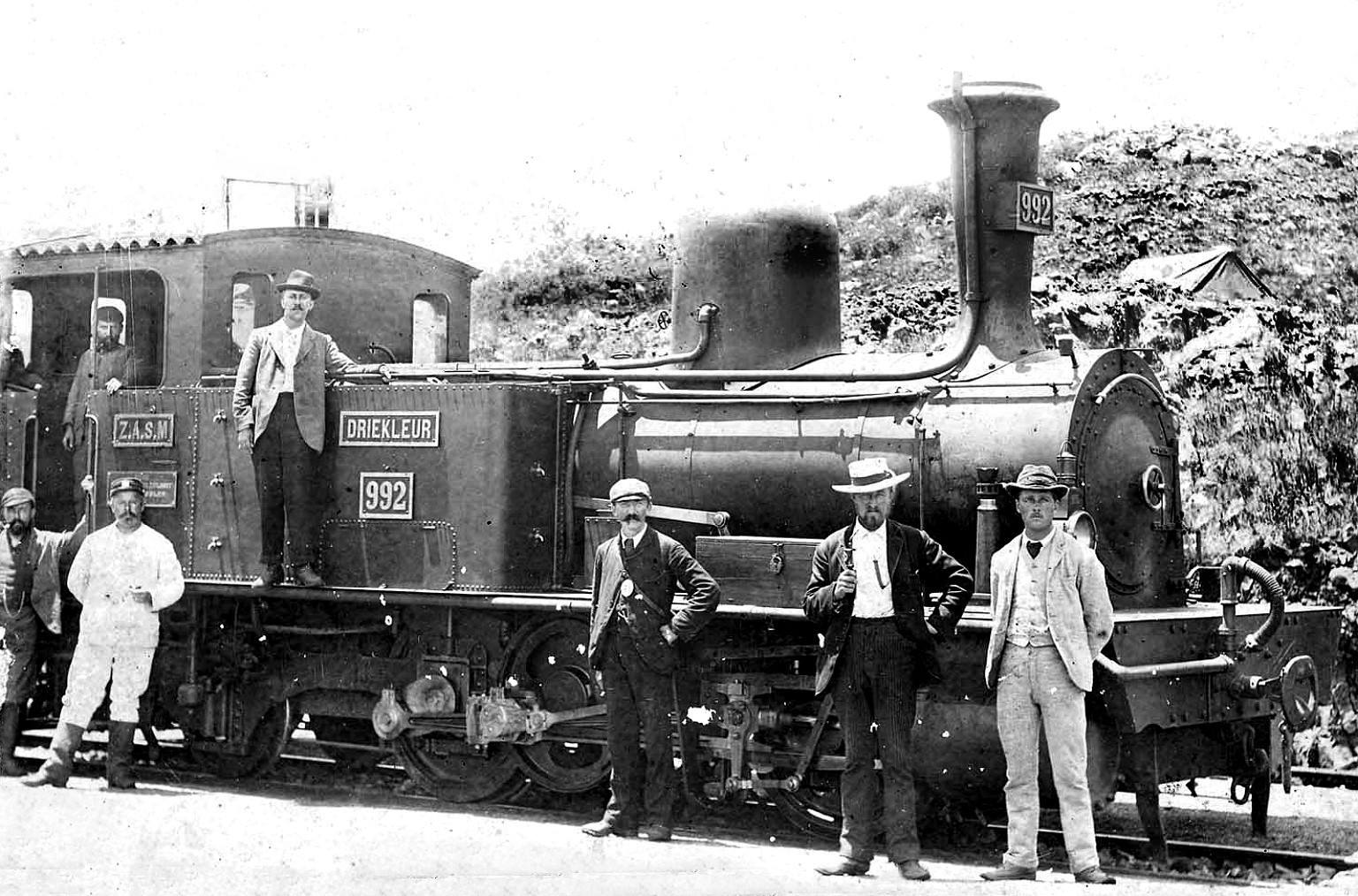
NZASM 32 Tonner 0-4-2 Rack Tank

Cape

- The Port Elizabeth Harbour Board places the first of eight 0-4-0 saddle-tank locomotives in shunting service at the Port Elizabeth Harbour.

Transvaal

- The Nederlandsche-Zuid-Afrikaansche Spoorweg-Maatschappij of the Zuid-Afrikaansche Republiek (Transvaal Republic) places three 32 Tonner rack tank locomotives in service on the rack section between Waterval Onder and Waterval Boven.
