= 1905 in South Africa =

- Decades: 1880s; 1890s; 1900s; 1910s; 1920s
- See also: List of years in South Africa

The following lists events that happened during 1905 in South Africa.

== Incumbents ==
- Governor of the Cape of Good Hope and High Commissioner for Southern Africa:Walter Hely-Hutchinson.
- Governor of the Colony of Natal: Henry Edward McCallum.
- Prime Minister of the Cape of Good Hope: Leander Starr Jameson.
- Prime Minister of the Orange River Colony: Alfred Milner (until 7 June), William Palmer, 2nd Earl of Selborne (starting 7 June).
- Prime Minister of the Colony of Natal: George Morris Sutton (until 16 May), Charles John Smythe (starting 16 May).

== Events ==
January

- 26 – The Cullinan Diamond, the largest diamond in the world at 3,106 carats (621.2 g), is discovered by Captain Frederick Wells at Cullinan.

Unknown date

- Non-whites are not given voting rights, except in the Cape Colony.
- The Cape Town City Hall in Darling Street is built.

== Births ==
- 3 February – Herman Charles Bosman, writer and journalist, is born at Kuilsrivier, Cape Town. (d. 1951)
- 8 April – Helen Joseph, activist, is born in Sussex, England. (d. 1992)
- 5 July – Jock Cameron, cricketer. (d. 1935)
- 9 August – Moses Kotane, anti-apartheid activist. (d. 1978)
- 2 September – Harry Hart, athlete. (d. 1979)
- 4 September – Eileen Mary Challans, writer is born in Essex, England. (d. 1983)

== Deaths ==
- 18 April – Enoch Sontonga, composer of Nkosi Sikelel' iAfrika, dies at age 32.

== Railways ==
=== Railway lines opened ===
- 1 February – Free State – Springfontein to Jagersfontein, 48 miles 13 chains (77.5 kilometres).
- 1 March – Free State – Aberfeldy to Bethlehem, 44 miles 10 chains (71.0 kilometres).
- 27 March – Transvaal – Rayton to Cullinan, 6 miles (9.7 kilometres).
- 1 May – Cape Western – Hutchinson to Pampoenpoort, 48 miles 28 chains (77.8 kilometres).
- 18 May – Cape Eastern – Xalanga to Elliot, 19 miles 27 chains (31.1 kilometres).
- 1 August – Transvaal – Klerksdorp to Vierfontein (Free State), 17 miles 15 chains (27.7 kilometres).
- 19 September – Cape Western – De Aar to Prieska, 112 miles 8 chains (180.4 kilometres).
- 1 November – Cape Eastern – Komga to Eagle, 27 miles 4 chains (43.5 kilometres).
- 1 November – Cape Midland – Humewood Road to Humansdorp (Narrow gauge), 68 miles 57 chains (110.6 kilometres).
- 1 November – Natal – Elandskop to Donnybrook, 42 miles 38 chains (68.4 kilometres).
- 2 November – Cape Eastern – Aliwal North to Lady Grey, 39 miles 65 chains (64.1 kilometres).
- 1 December – Cape Western – Cape Town to Sea Point, 3 miles 51 chains (5.9 kilometres).
- 16 December – Cape Western – Van der Stel to Strand, 2 miles 6 chains (3.3 kilometres).
- 16 December – Free State – Modderpoort to Ladybrand, 7 miles (11.3 kilometres).

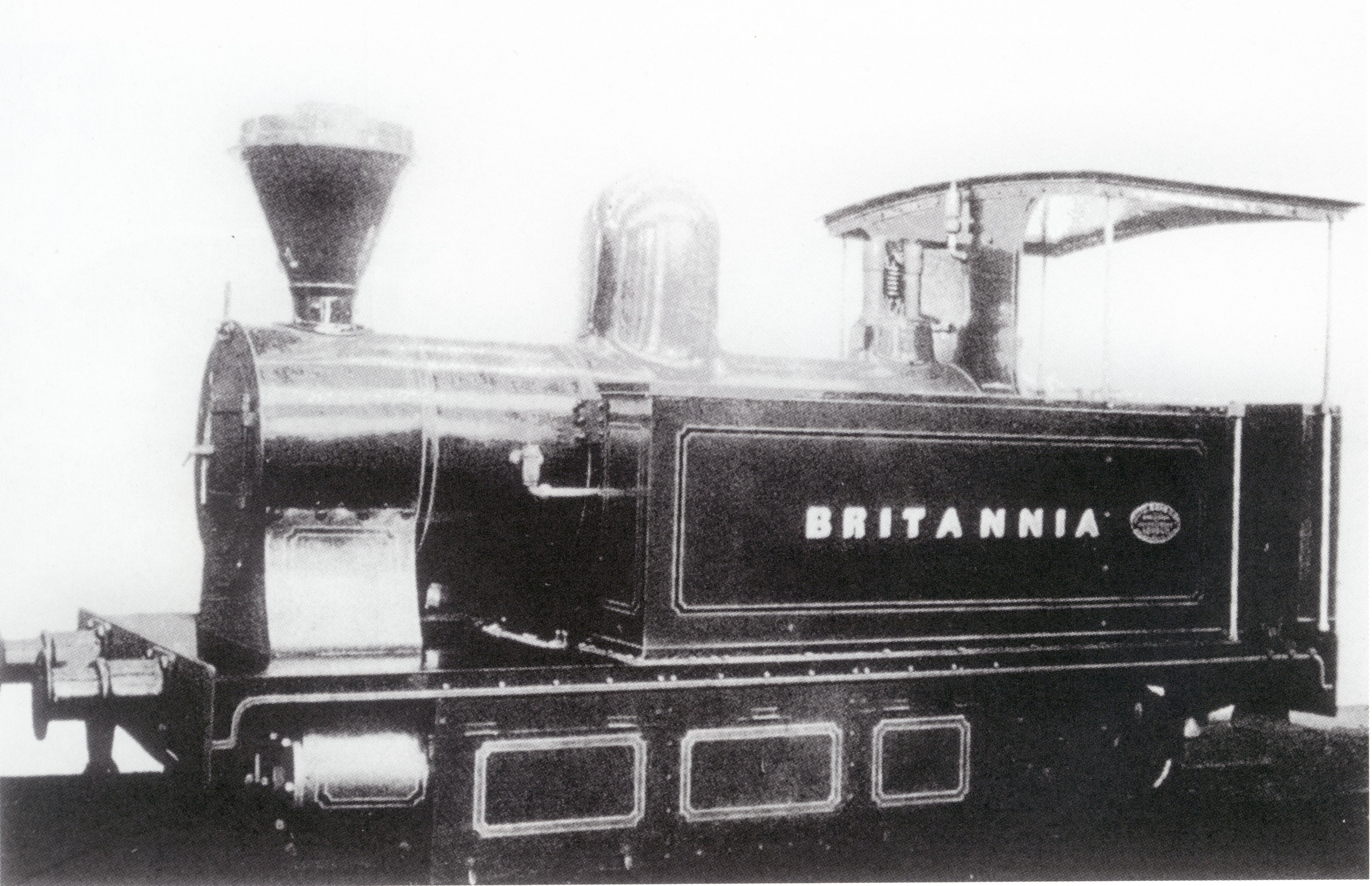
Namaqualand 0-4-2T Britannia

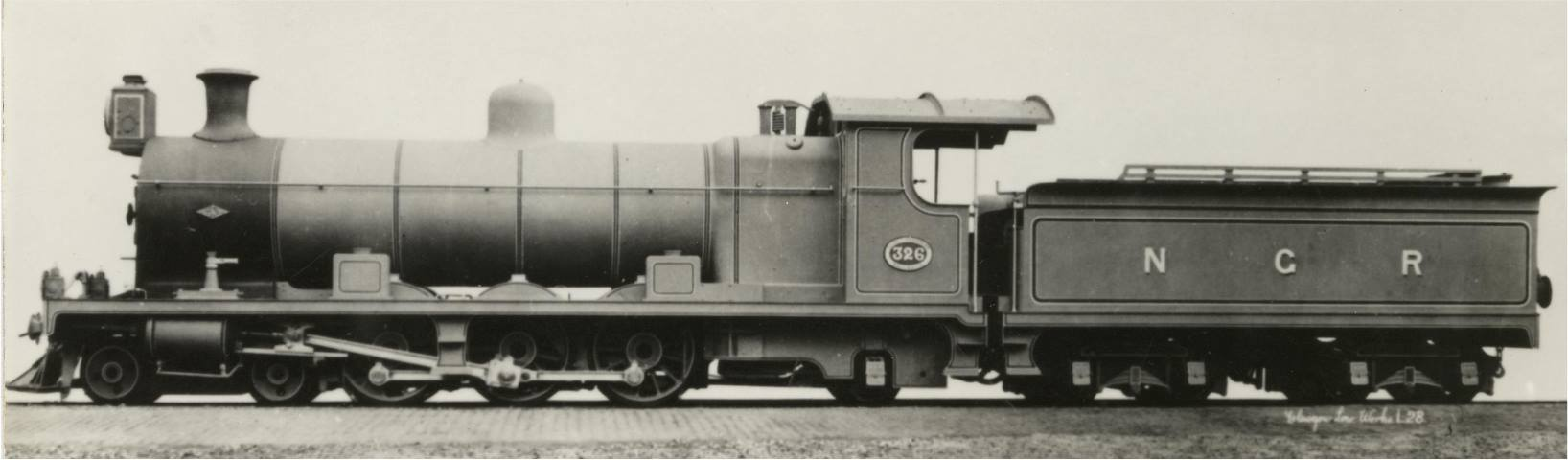
NGR Class A

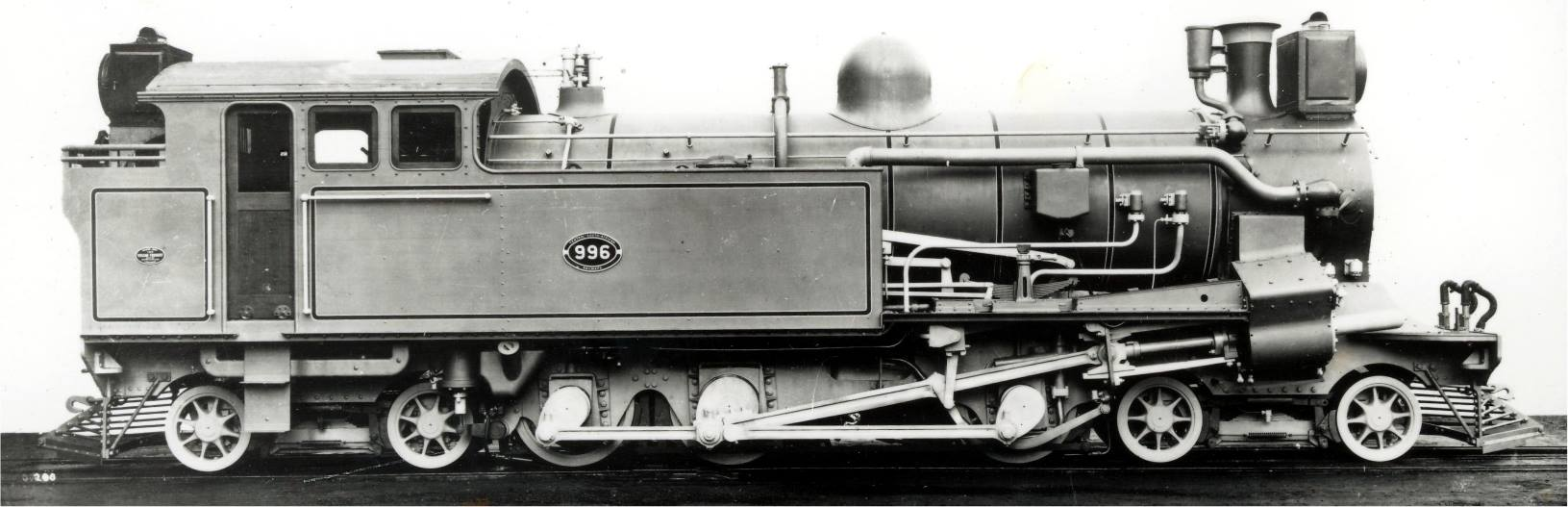
CSAR Rack 4-6-4RT

- 18 December – Free State – Marseilles to Maseru in Basutoland, 16 miles 32 chains (26.4 kilometres).
- 20 December – Transvaal – Springs to Breyten, 121 miles 78 chains (196.3 kilometres).
- 22 December – Free State – Dover to Parys, 20 miles 18 chains (32.5 kilometres).

=== Locomotives ===
Cape

- A single 0-4-2 tank locomotive named Britannia is placed in service by the Cape Copper Company as a shunting engine at Port Nolloth in the Cape Colony.

Natal

- The Natal Government Railways places two Class A 4-6-2 Pacific locomotives in service, designed by Locomotive Superintendent D.A. Hendrie for passenger traffic on the mainline between Ladysmith and Charlestown. In 1912 they will be designated Class 2 on the South African Railways (SAR).

Transvaal

- The Central South African Railways places two four-cylinder rack tank steam locomotives in service on the section between Waterval Onder and Waterval Boven, but they are underpowered and prove to be failures in rack service.
