= CSAR Rack 4-6-4RT =

Class of South African rack 4-6-4T locomotives

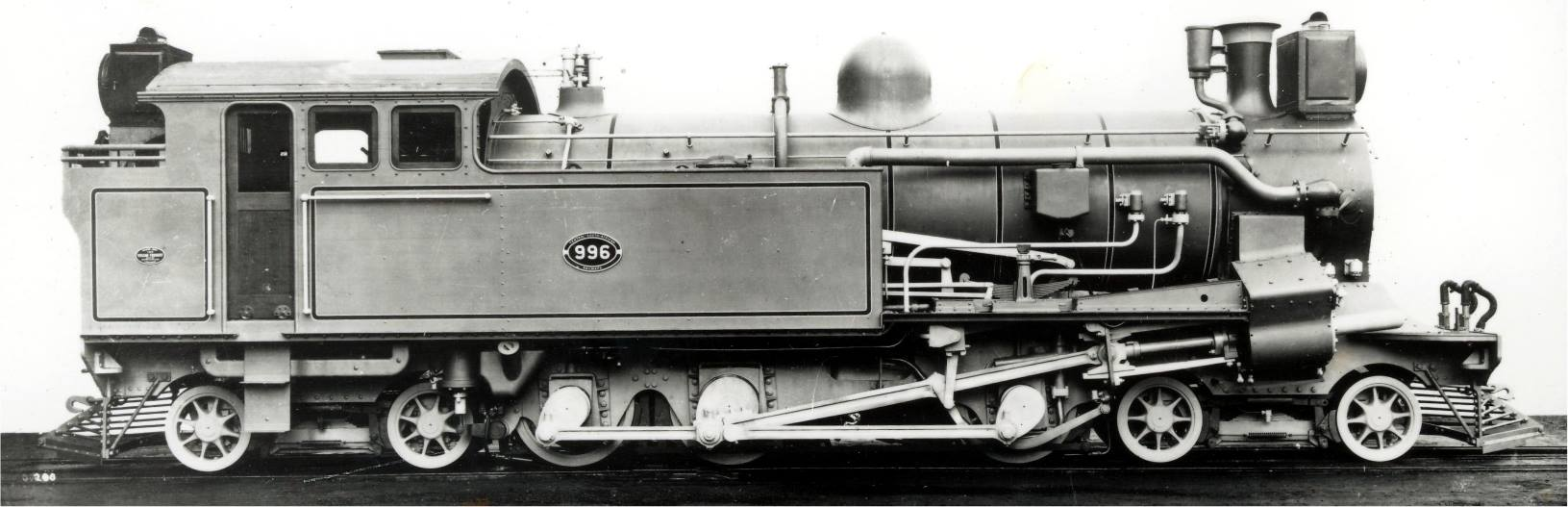
- CSAR rack locomotive no. 996, c. 1906
Type and origin
- Power type: Steam
- Designer: Central South African Railways (P.A. Hyde)
- Builder: Vulcan Foundry
- Serial number: 1942-1943
- Model: CSAR Rack
- Build date: 1905
- Total produced: 2
- Rebuilder: Central South African Railways
- Rebuild date: 1906
- Number rebuilt: 2
Specifications
- Configuration
  - Whyte: 4-6-4RT (Baltic)
  - UIC: 2′C2′ n4t as built 2′C2′ n2t modified
- Driver: 2nd coupled axle
- Gauge: 3 ft 6 in (1,067 mm) Cape gauge
- Leading dia.: 30 in (762 mm)
- Coupled dia.: 42 1/4 in (1,073 mm)
- Trailing dia.: 30 in (762 mm)
- Wheelbase: 33 ft 7 in (10,236 mm)
  - Axle spacing (Asymmetrical): 1-2: 8 ft 3 in (2,515 mm); 2-3: 4 ft 6 in (1,372 mm)
  - Leading: 6 ft 4 in (1,930 mm)
  - Coupled: 12 ft 9 in (3,886 mm)
  - Trailing: 6 ft 4 in (1,930 mm)
- Length
  - Over couplers: 41 ft 5 in (12,624 mm)
- Height: 13 ft (3,962 mm)
- Frame type: Plate
- Axle load: 15 LT 15 cwt (16,000 kg)
  - Leading: 18 LT (18,290 kg)
  - Coupled: 15 LT 15 cwt (16,000 kg)
  - Trailing: 19 LT (19,300 kg)
- Adhesive weight: 47 LT 5 cwt (48,010 kg)
- Loco weight: 84 LT 5 cwt (85,600 kg)
- Fuel type: Coal
- Fuel capacity: 96 cu ft (2.7 m^{3})
- Water cap.: 1,200 imp gal (5,500 L)
- Firebox
  - Type: Round-top
  - Grate area: 33.5 sq ft (3.11 m^{2})
- Boiler
  - Pitch: 7 ft 6 in (2,286 mm)
  - Diameter: 5 ft (1,524 mm)
  - Tube plates: 12 ft 7 in (3,835 mm)
  - Small tubes: 197: 2 in (51 mm)
- Boiler pressure: 200 psi (1,379 kPa)
- Safety valve: Ramsbottom
- Heating surface
  - Firebox: 140.2 sq ft (13.03 m^{2})
  - Tubes: 1,298.13 sq ft (120.600 m^{2})
  - Total surface: 1,438.33 sq ft (133.625 m^{2})
- Cylinders: Four as built, two modified
- Cylinder size: 18 in (457 mm) bore 20 in (508 mm) stroke
- Valve gear: Joy
- Valve type: Balanced slide
- Loco brake: Counter-pressure steam
- Train brakes: Vacuum
- Couplers: Johnston link-and-pin
Performance figures
- Tractive effort: 23,000 lbf (100 kN) @ 75%
Career
- Operators: Central South African Railways; South African Railways
- Class: CSAR Rack
- Number in class: 2
- Numbers: CSAR 995-996; SAR O995-O996
- Delivered: 1905
- First run: 1905
- Withdrawn: 1915

The Central South African Railways Rack 4-6-4RT of 1905 was a South African steam locomotive from the pre-Union era in Transvaal Colony.

In 1905, the Central South African Railways placed two four-cylinder rack tank locomotives with a 4-6-4 Baltic type wheel arrangement in service on the section between Waterval Onder and Waterval Boven. The locomotives were underpowered and proved to be failures in rack service, with the result that their rack mechanisms were removed in 1906 to convert them to ordinary two-cylinder tank locomotives.

== Manufacturer ==
In 1905, the Central South African Railways (CSAR) placed orders with Vulcan Foundry for the construction of two 4-6-4 Baltic type rack tank locomotives for use on the rack section between Waterval Onder and Waterval Boven. According to the designs and specifications of CSAR Chief Locomotive Superintendent P.A. Hyde, the CSAR Rack locomotive was to have a bar frame, two cylinders with 18 inches (457 millimetres) bore and 30 inches (762 millimetres) stroke, and was to use the same drive system as the Nederlandsche-Zuid-Afrikaansche Spoorweg-Maatschappij 32 Tonner, CSAR Class G, which had proven satisfactory in rack service. The two locomotives were delivered in 1905, numbered 995 and 996, following on from the number range of the Class G rack locomotives.

The builders chose not to adhere to the original designs and specifications. The cylinder stroke was reduced to 20 inches (508 millimetres) and two inner cylinders of the same dimensions were added to drive the rack mechanism independently. A plate frame was used instead of the specified bar frame. The main plate frames were 1 1/4 inches (32 millimetres) thick and were arranged outside the coupled wheels. The balanced flat slide valves were actuated by Joy valve gear.

The boiler capacity was not increased to compensate for the additional cylinders and, in service, trouble was experienced under working conditions. Tests showed that the locomotives could not maintain steam and had insufficient adhesive weight to prevent slipping on the steep gradient. The boiler had to generate the supply of steam while the engine passed through the tunnel at the head of the incline with the blast pipe not functioning, since the exhaust steam was diverted to the side tanks while the counter-pressure air brake system was in operation.

== Characteristics ==
Even though it turned out to be a failure in service, the locomotive design had several novel features at the time.

=== Rack mechanism ===
The outside cylinders drove the coupled wheels and the inside cylinders drove a coupled pair of rack wheels. The rack wheels were carried on a frame suspended from the widely separated leading and driving coupled wheel axles, which had an 8 feet 3 inches (2,515 millimetres) wheelbase.

Rather than the bar frame as specified, an outside plate frame was used to accommodate the inside cylinders. The connecting rods of the inside engine were not connected directly to the crank pins, but to projections on the coupling rods which actuated the rack gear. This method of coupling was unavoidable due to the restricted width of only 3 feet 3 inches (991 millimetres) between tyres.

To compensate for tyre wear on the coupled driving wheels, the rack axle bearings could be adjusted vertically, while the rack wheel teeth were of involute form to ensure correct action between adjustments. The inner cranks were of the disk type, with triangular circumferential grooves to take the cast-iron brake blocks of the rack engine hand brake.

=== Brake systems ===
The valve gear of the outside and inside sets of motion could each be separately reversed by its own screw gear, while each set also had its own independent regulators, injectors and feed pumps. The locomotive had steam brakes on all coupled wheels as well as both bogies, the first and last South African steam locomotive to be equipped with braked bogies. The coupled wheels and the rack engine's crank disks had separate hand brakes and the inside and outside piston pairs had separate counter-pressure air brakes. In addition, the locomotive had a combination ejector to work the train's vacuum brakes.

The Le Chatelier counter-pressure air brake system made use of the following:

- A valve in the base of the blastpipe isolated the cylinders from the smokebox to prevent the ingress of hot gases and cinders when the motion was reversed.
- Air was drawn from outside the smokebox through a pair of non-return valves into the exhaust ports, from where it was compressed into the steam chests.
- The compressed air was allowed to escape into the atmosphere through a graduating discharge valve and a silencer, mounted behind the chimney.
- To take up the heat of compression and prevent overheating of the cylinders, a small water jet delivered a cold spray into the exhaust passages.

=== Cab ===
To protect the crew from the smoke and gases in the tunnel, the large cab was totally enclosed and had side doors and windows.

== Service ==
=== Central South African Railways ===
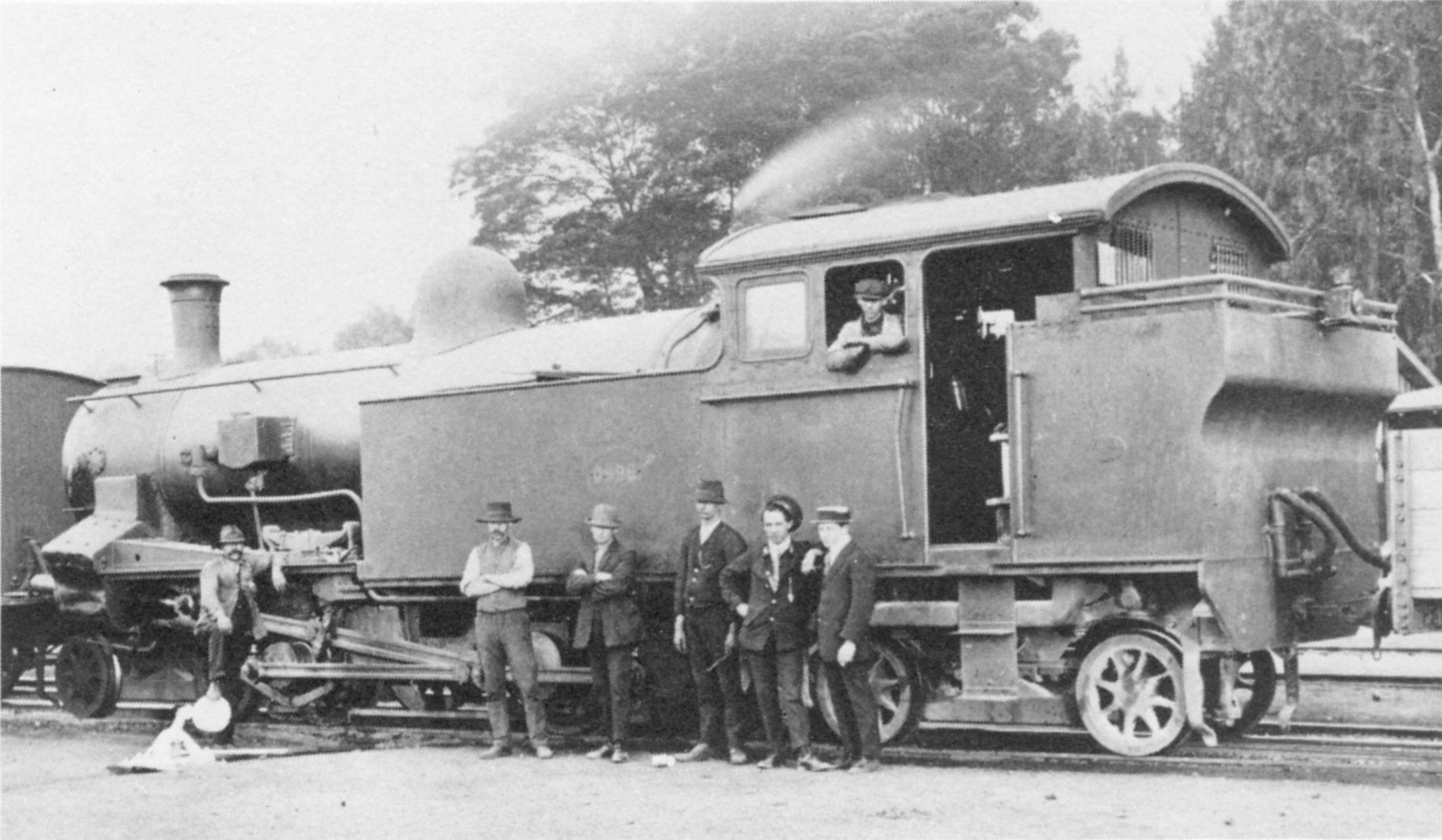
Converted rack no. 0995, c. 1912

In spite of its advanced features, the CSAR Rack locomotive was a failure and was outperformed by the older and much smaller predecessor Class G rack locomotive. As a result, the rack mechanisms of both locomotives were removed within a year of their entering service, converting them to ordinary two-cylinder tank locomotives. Owing to their failure, the old 32 Tonners remained in service until 1908, when a new alignment with easier gradients, including a new tunnel, was constructed and the rack section could be abandoned.

Their failure can be attributed directly to the fact that two additional cylinders were introduced by the builders while the boiler capacity remained the same, which resulted in a locomotive with an inadequate steaming ability. In addition, the complicated rack mechanism led to perpetual maintenance problems.

=== South African Railways ===
When the Union of South Africa was established on 31 May 1910, the three Colonial government railways (Cape Government Railways, Natal Government Railways and CSAR) were united under a single administration to control and administer the railways, ports and harbours of the Union. Although the South African Railways and Harbours came into existence in 1910, the actual classification and renumbering of all the rolling stock of the three constituent railways were only implemented with effect from 1 January 1912.

In 1912, the locomotives were considered obsolete and were not classified or renumbered, but instead only had the numeral "0" prefixed to their existing numbers. Both locomotives were withdrawn from service by 1915, a mere ten years after being built.
