= 1907 in South Africa =

- Decades: 1880s; 1890s; 1900s; 1910s; 1920s
- See also: List of years in South Africa

The following lists events that happened during 1907 in South Africa.

== Incumbents ==
- Governor of the Cape of Good Hope and High Commissioner for Southern Africa:Walter Hely-Hutchinson.
- Governor of the Colony of Natal: Matthew Nathan.
- Prime Minister of the Cape of Good Hope: Leander Starr Jameson.
- Prime Minister of the Colony of Natal: Frederick Robert Moor.
- Prime Minister of the Orange River Colony: Hamilton John Goold-Adams.
- Prime Minister of the Transvaal Colony: Louis Botha.

== Events ==
March

- 22 – The Transvaal Asiatic Registration Act is passed in parliament, sparking protests by Indians.

July

- 1 – The Orange River Colony gains autonomy as the Orange Free State.

Reggie walker winning gold in the Olympics

== Births ==
- 30 December – Geoffrey Cronjé founder of Apartheid

== Railways ==
=== Railway lines opened ===
- 1 January – Cape Western – Misgund to Avontuur (Narrow gauge), 21 miles 14 chains (34.1 kilometres).
- 13 March – Transvaal – Breyten to Ermelo, 18 miles 46 chains (29.9 kilometres).
- 18 April – Natal – Estcourt to Weenen (Narrow gauge), 28 miles 62 chains (46.3 kilometres).
- 15 May – Natal – Loskop to Winterton, 10 miles 60 chains (17.3 kilometres).
- 16 May – Cape Western – Mafeking to Buurman's Drift, 9 miles 20 chains (14.9 kilometres).

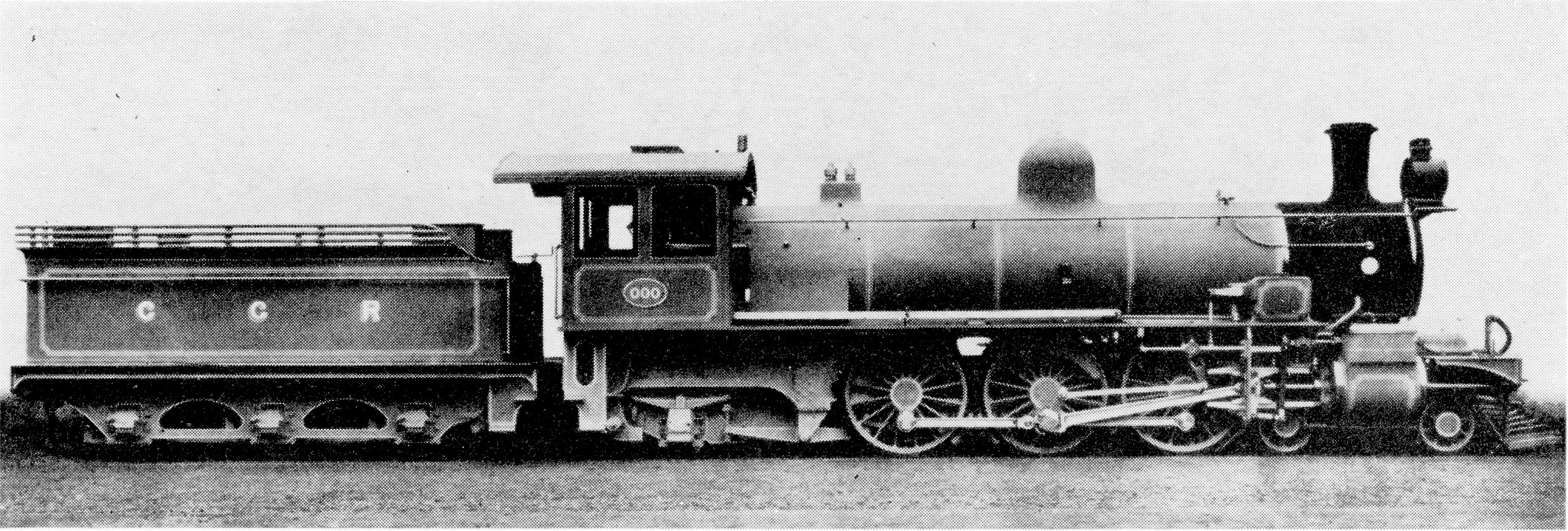
SAR Class Experimental 1

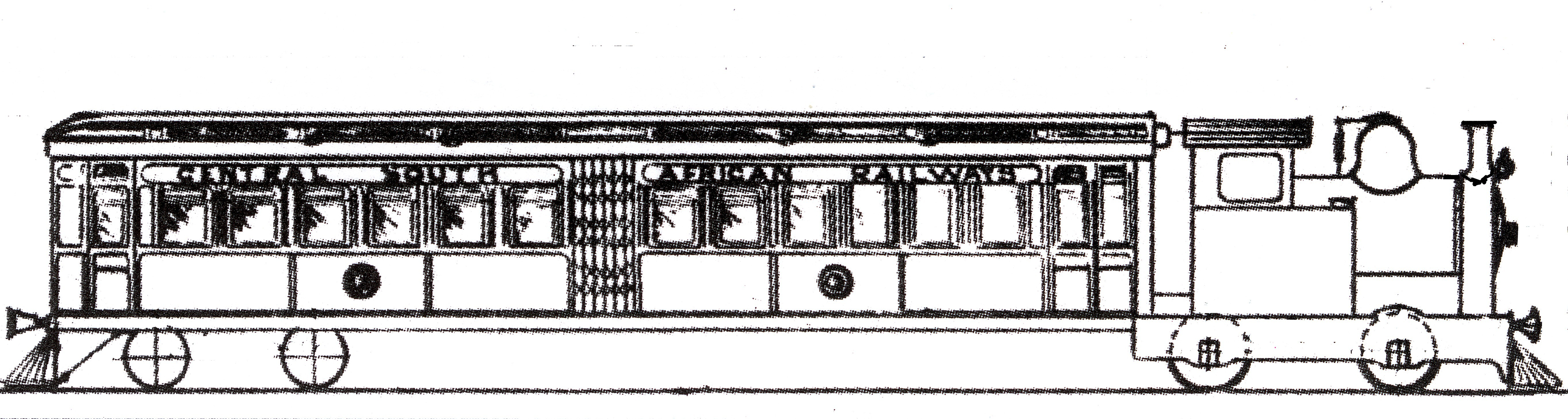
CSAR Railmotor

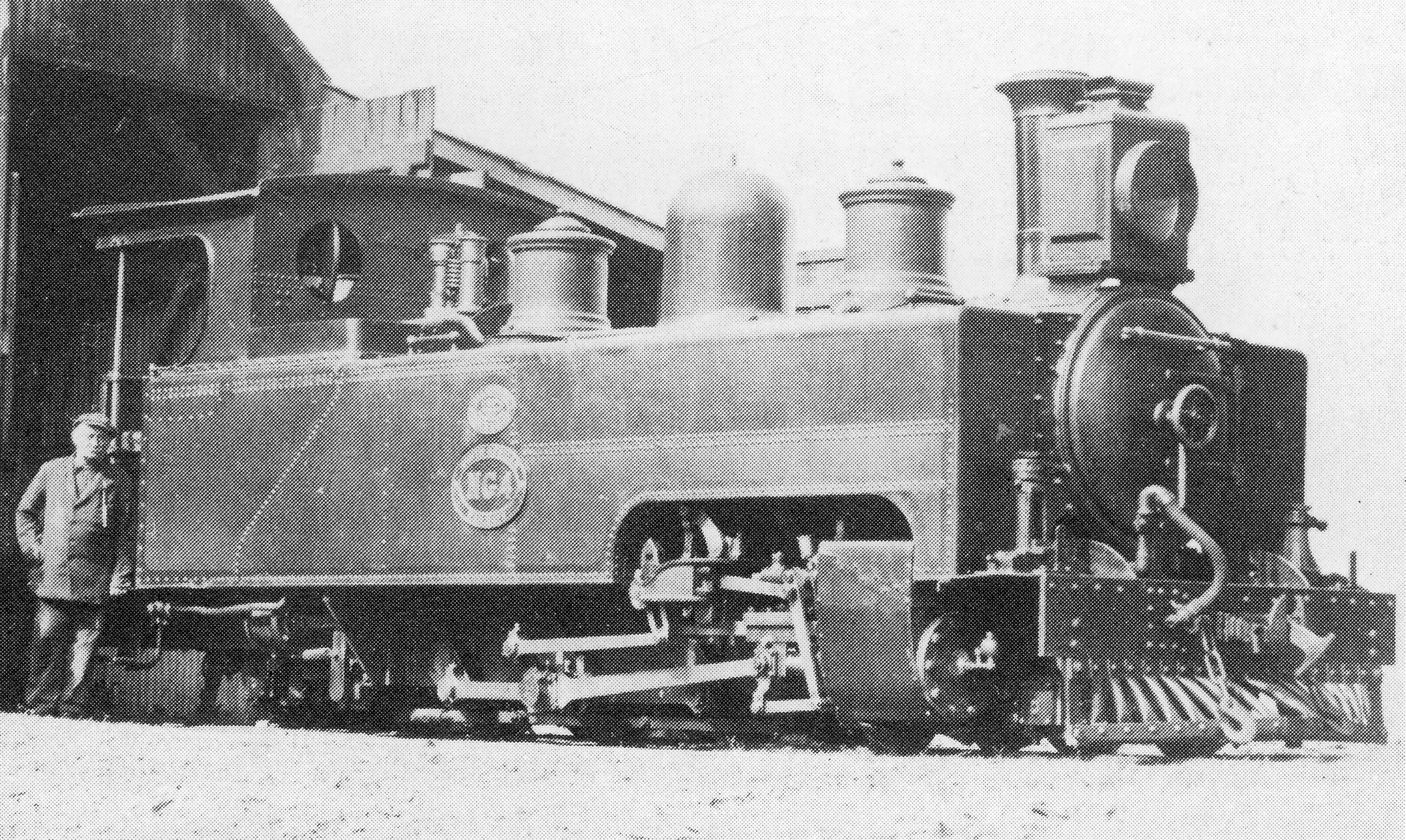
SAR Class NG3

- 2 July – Free State – Modderpoort to Bethlehem, 103 miles 64 chains (167.0 kilometres).
- 5 July – Transvaal – Krugersdorp to Zeerust, 127 miles 17 chains (204.7 kilometres).
- 14 July – Cape Midland – Knysna to Templeman, 21 miles (33.8 kilometres).
- 2 September – Natal – North Shepstone to South Shepstone, 2 miles 10 chains (3.4 kilometres).
- 25 September – Cape Midland – Mosselbaai to George, 32 miles 49 chains (52.5 kilometres).

=== Locomotives ===
- The Cape Government Railways places a single experimental 4-6-2 Pacific three cylinder compound steam locomotive in service, based on the second series of its Karoo Class locomotives. In 1912 it will be designated Class Experimental 1 on the South African Railways (SAR).
- The Central South African Railways acquires a single self-contained Railmotor, a passenger coach that is an integral part of the locomotive itself, for its railmotor passenger service that had been introduced in 1906.
- The Natal Government Railways places six 4-6-2 Pacific type narrow gauge tank steam locomotives in service. By 1930 they will be designated Class NG3 on the SAR.
