= Maximilianus Transylvanus =

16th century European writer

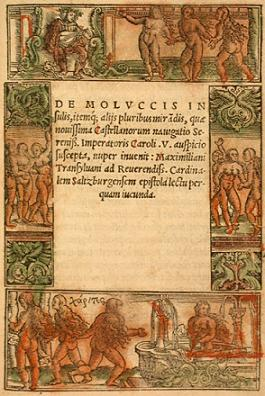
The first edition of Transylvanus' account

Maximilian van Sevenbergen, Latinized in Maximilianus Transylvanus (Transilvanus, Transylvanianus), also Maximilianus of Transylvania and Maximilian (Maximiliaen) von Sevenborgen (between 1485 and 1490 – 1538, Brussels), was a courtier of Emperor Charles V who is mainly known for having authored the earliest account published on the Magellan and Elcano expedition, the first circumnavigation of the world (1519–1522). Written after he interviewed the survivors of the Victoria, and being a relative of its sponsor Christopher de Haro, his account De Moluccis Insulis is a main source of information about the expedition along with those of Antonio Pigafetta and Peter Martyr.

== His family ==
Coat of arms of the van Sevenberghen family known as Transylvanus

I) Steven (Stephanus) van Sevenbergen (His family may have come from the village of Zevenbergen in North Brabant, which was also the native town of Erasmus's mother), married Joanna Meers.

II) Lucas van Sevenbergen, bourgeois of Brussels, goldsmith, living in Brussels, valet de chambre and engraver of seals of Maximilian king of the Romans, married Jeanne Meerte, born around 1466, daughter of the goldsmith Guillaume Meerte, from the Seven Noble Houses of Brussels, and Gertrude Schuelens. Lucas van Sevenbergen and Jeanne Meerte had three children:

1. Maximilian van Sevenbergen, according to Maximilanus Transylvanus, which follows under III.
2. Barbele van Sevenbergen, mentioned in 1521 as the wife of Master Alexander Schweis, former secretary of the Emperor of the Romans, secretary of the count of Nassau.
3. Anna van Sevenbergen, mentioned in 1513, died in June 1516.

III) Maximilian van Sevenbergen according to Maximilianus Transylvanus married in 1521 Françoise de Haro, daughter of Diego, Antwerp merchant and friend of Magellan, and Jeanne Pynapel, deceased in 1530. In 1531 he married Catherine de Mol, daughter of Roland, squire, lord of Loupoigne and of Grambais, alderman and burgermeister of Brussels, member of the Serroelofs lineage. With her he had two daughters:

- 1) Jeanne van Sevenbergen, lady of Loupoigne and of Bouchout, wife of Gérard van Veltwijck, knight, secretary and ambassador of Charles V, and in her second marriage married Francis Prosper de Genève general of the guards of the duke of Savoie.
- 2) Marie van Sevenbergen, lady of Grambais, married in 1558 Bernard de Merode, lieutenant of the guards of king Philippe II then one of the leaders of the uprising of the Low Countries.

He had two recognized natural children:

- 3) Maximilian van Sevenbergen, born around 1523, from his concubine Catherine Nijs or Catherine Mysnon. He was legitimized in August 1525.
- 4) Jeanne van Sevenbergen, born around 1527 of unknown mother, married in 1545 Henri van Heymbeke.

== The Transylvanus Palace in Brussels ==
Maximilianus Transylvanus had built a sumptuous Italian-style palace in Brussels opposite the Sablon church, which was celebrated in Latin verses by the poet Janus Secundus.

== His castle near Brussels ==
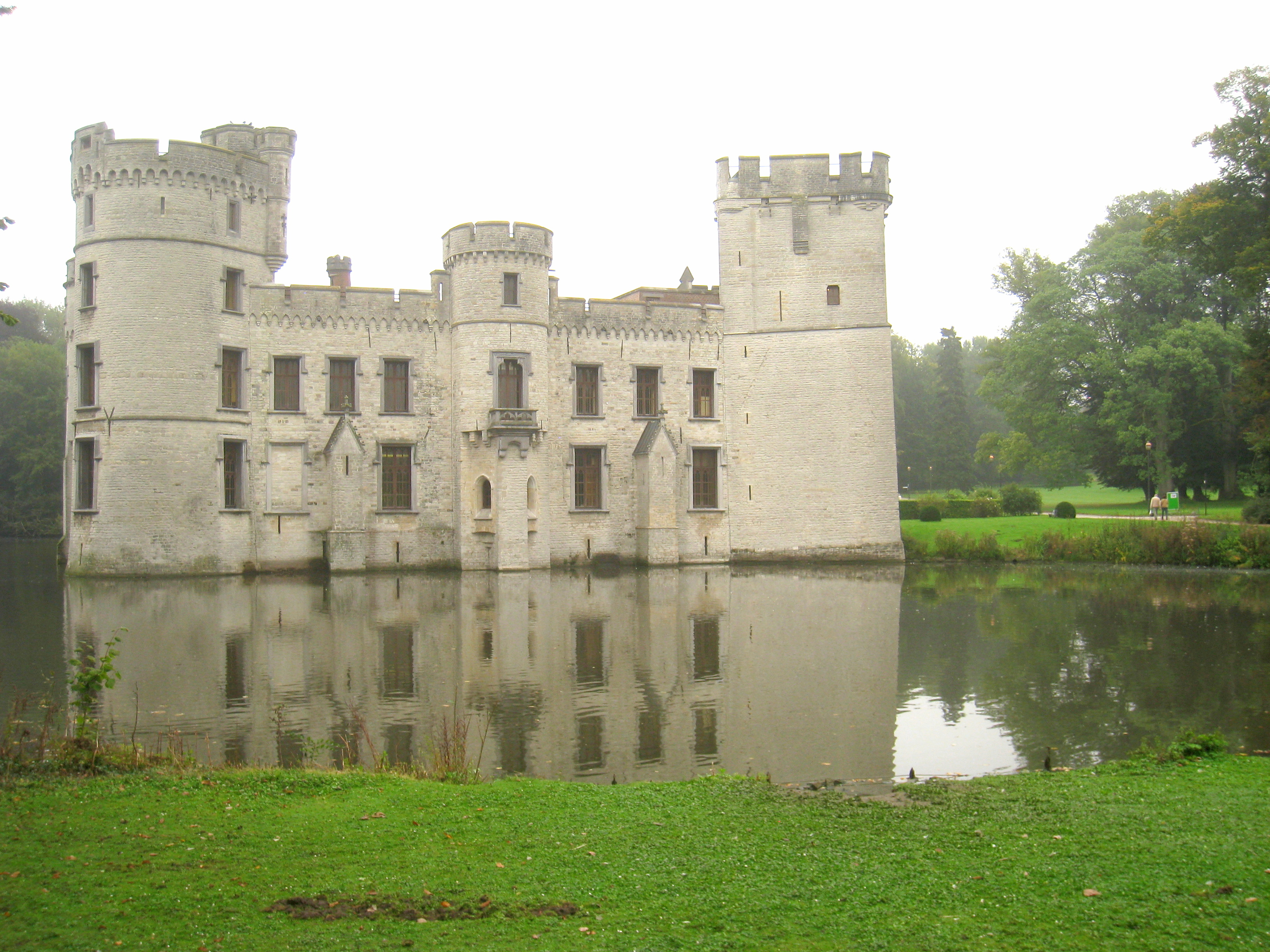
Bouchout Castle in Meise, near Brussels, acquired in 1537 by Maximilianus Transylvanus

He acquired in 1537 the Bouchout Castle in Meise, near Brussels.

== Legends about his origins and paternity ==
Maximilianus Transylvanus' origins and paternity are a matter of dispute among historians.

In spite of his surname, Transylvanus is said to have come from Flanders, not Transylvania, and to have been a natural or bastard son of Archbishop Lang von Wellenburg, which is impossible because when he was born in 1490, Mathäus Lang was a poor student in Tübingen, and the father of Transylvanus was then a wealthy goldsmith, living in Brussels. Lang von Wellenberg, born in 1469 to a burgher family, took holy orders much later in life (in 1519).

=== Flemish origins ===
Scholars point to a Flemish provenance due to the fact that:

- Transylvanus was married to Frances, who was a niece of Christopher de Haro, the Lisbon-based merchant who was a friend of Magellan's as well as his financial backer. She was the daughter of Jacob de Haro, the head of a commercial firm based in Antwerp.
- Transylvanus had many ties with Brussels. A piece of Latin poetry he wrote in Faria argues that Transylvanus received his surname from the fact that he was a member of one of the many diplomats sent to Transylvania, which was part of the Kingdom of Hungary.
- Transylvanus died in Brussels around 1538.
- Sigismund von Herberstein (1486–1566), the diplomat, writer, historian mentions him as Maximilian von Sibenpergen, while Konrad Peutinger (1465–1547) the humanists knows him as Maximilian Sybenberger, both clearly referring to his real surname "van Sevenbergen" which may have also derived from the Dutch town of "Zevenbergen" which is also the German name for Transylvania : Siebenbürgen. Both were also contemporaries and probably personal friends of Maximilianus.

=== The legend of a Transylvanian origin ===
In an 1891 letter to Notes and Queries, a scholar (identified only as "L.L.K.") wrote:

"I am anxious to trace the origin of the fable about the parentage of this writer. In several books and booksellers' catalogues, he is stated to be the natural son of Matthew Lang, Archbishop of Salzburg, (cf., e.g., The Life of Ferdinand Magellan, by Dr. Guillemard, p. 146). This is absolutely false. The father of Maximilian was a Transylvanian nobleman, who was killed in the battle of Mohács in 1526. Cf. the letter of Don Martin de Salinas to King Ferdinand, dated Valladolid, 11 March 1527, in Gayango's 'Spanish Calendar.' It has been suggested to me that a passage in Peter Martyr's Epistola DXLIII., dated "Guadaluppe III. Kal. Jan. 1515," might have given rise to the fable; but the passage is so clear that it is difficult to imagine how it could be mistranslated".

In 1916, the same scholar wrote in to state:

"The Catalogue of the fifth portion of the Huth Collection is still repeating that ancient myth that Maximilian had addressed his famous letter De Moluccis Insulis to 'his father, the Cardinal Archbishop of Salzburg.' His father was 'Maître Luc dit Transilvain ou de Transilvanie (Van Sevenborge)," according to a deed seen by the late M. Alphonse Wauters. Cf. Histoire des Environs de Bruxells (1855), vol. ii. p. 288."

Francis Henry Hill Guillemard, however, in the work referred to in the first letter, only wrote that "Maximilian was a natural son of the Archbishop of Salzburg," without naming the archbishop in question.

One of the main arguments in favor of Maximilianus' Transylvanian origin: The renowned humanist and Bishop of Pécs (later archbishop of Esztergom, Hungary) Nicolaus Olahus' 1534 dated letter mentions "noster Maximilianus Transylvanus", that is "our Transylvanian Maximilianus", with whom he became a close friend in Brussels bonded by the shared heritage: "Based on our common fatherland we are in great intimacy with one another, as he says, and I believe (pro ea, quae inter nos ob patriam communem intercedit familiaritas ut ipse dicit, ergo qouque ita credo, non vulgaris)". It is also well known that Nicolaus Olahus was born in Hermannstadt (in Hungarian: Nagyszeben; today in Rumanian: Sibiu) in Transylvania.

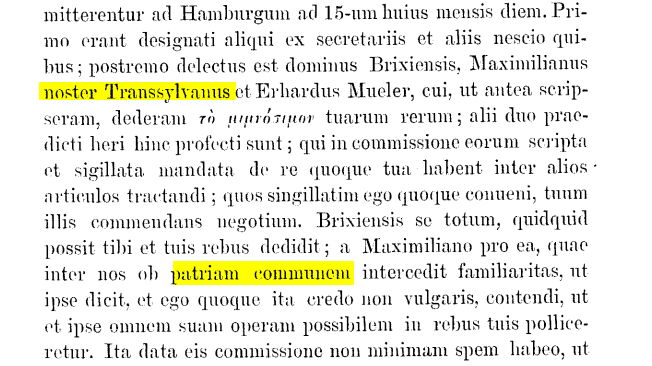
Fragment of the letter of Nicolaus Olahus (1534)

== Works ==
In 1520, Transylvanus had published, at Augsburg, a work in Latin that describes the reception that nominated Charles I, King of Spain, as Holy Roman Emperor in 1519 at Molins de Rei, in Spain. This is the Legatio ad sacratissimum ac invictum Caesarem divum Carolum .... ab reverendissimis et illustrissimis principibus ... qua functus est ...Federicus comes palatinus in Molendino regio vlt. Novembris Anno MDXIX (Augsburg: Sigismund Grimm und Marx Wirsung, 1520). At this point, Maximilianus seems to have already been serving as personal secretary to Charles V, as well as accompanying the monarch on his travels.

As Secretary to Charles V, the Holy Roman Emperor, for whom Magellan had sailed, Transylvanus interviewed the survivors of the voyage when Magellan's surviving ship Victoria returned to Spain in September 1522. This group included Juan Sebastián Elcano, Francisco Albo, and Hernando de Bustamante. The result was Maximiliani Transyluani Caesaris a secretis epistola, de admirabili & novissima hispanoru in orientem navigatione, que auriae, & nulli prius accessae regiones sunt, cum ipsis etia moluccis insulis, published in Cologne in 1523.

Maximilianus, a pupil of Peter Martyr Vermigli, interviewed the surviving members of the expedition when they presented themselves to the Spanish court at Valladolid in the fall of 1522. Eager to acquire fame as a writer, he produced his tract De Moluccis Insulis as a letter to Matthäus Lang von Wellenburg, the Cardinal-Archbishop of Salzburg, who had suggested that he perform the interviews in the first place. It may have also been Vermigli who suggested the project to the young courtier. Vermigli, was, after all, very interested in overseas exploration.

Maximilianus' letter is dated 24 October 1522, and his account was sent to Lang, whom he calls ambiguously domine mi unice ("my sole lord"), while the cardinal-archbishop was attending the Diet of Nuremberg. This diet was concerned with pacifying the first Protestants, which resulted in the sending of a letter of appeal to Pope Adrian VI.

Maximilianus' letter reached the hands of a Cologne printer, Eucharius Cervicornus (a Latinized rendering of "Hirtzhorn"), and the first edition of De Moluccis Insulis was printed in January 1523. Despite the war that had erupted between Charles V and Francis I of France (see Italian War of 1521), this first edition reached Paris, where it was printed anew by Pierre Viart in July 1523. A subsequent edition was printed at Rome by Minutius Calvus (Minizio Calvo), in November 1523.

== De Moluccis Insulis ==
Transylvanus had a lively interest in Magellan's expedition around the world. However, his information should not be entirely accepted at face value, as Transylvanus uncritically accepted the testimony he took down from the surviving crew members. He was also in a hurry to get his letter published.

The account written by Antonio Pigafetta, the expedition's official chronicler and one of the survivors of the voyage, did not appear in print until 1525, in Paris, and was not wholly published until the last year of the 18th century; this was the edition by Carlo Amoretti published in 1800. This edition is now famously called the Ambrosiana codex. It is through Transylvanus' account that Europe was informed of the first circumnavigation of the globe.

Transylvanus recorded gossip on board about the mutiny that occurred during Magellan's voyage, calling it a "shameful and foul conspiracy" among the Spanish officers and men. Pigafetta and Transylvanus differ on who was responsible for the massacre that occurred at Cebu in the Philippines. Transylvanus states that it was João Serrão who mistreated Enrique de Malacca, Magellan's former slave, thereby causing Enrique to plot the massacre; Pigafetta, who did not attend the banquet that served as the trap, blames Duarte Barbosa.

Transylvanus' text also includes a fairly accurate description of how spices were grown. "The natives share groves of this tree among themselves," he writes, "just as we do vineyards".

A surviving copy of the first edition of his work can be found in the Beinecke Library (Yale University). A second edition can be found at the Nederlands Scheepvaartmuseum (Amsterdam). Princeton University Library has copies of the Cologne and Rome printings. The National Library of the Philippines' Permanent Gallery has De Moluccis Insulis, a 1520s pocket-sized book with a black cover.

== Notes ==
1. Samuel Eliot Morison, The European Discovery of America: The Southern Voyages 1492-1616 (New York: Oxford University Press, 1974), 325.
2. "Maximilianus Transylvanus," Notes and Queries, 1891, Series 7, Volume XI, June 6, 1891, p. 448.
3. "Maximilianus Transylvanus," Notes and Queries, 1916, Series 2, Volume II, July 29, 1916.
4. Sigmund von Herberstein: Selbstbiographie. In Fontes rerumg Austricarum. Österreichische Geschichtsquellen. I. Abt: Scriptores, 1. Bd.Wien, 1855, Seite 192.
5. Please see: Menschendörfer: Siebenbürger - Der Name und seine Träger in Europa vom 13. bis 17. Jh., p. 70.
6. Arnold Ipoly: Oláh Miklós levelezése (Correspondence of Nicolaus Olahus), Monumenta Hungariae Historica., Diplomataria, vol. 25, 1875, Publ.: Budapest, a M. T. Akadémia könyvkiadó hivatala. p. 452.
7. Francisco Leite de Faria, "Primeiras relações impressas sobre a viagem de Fernão de Magalhães," in A Viagem de Fernão de Magalhães e a Questão das Molucas. Actas do II Colóquio Luso-Espanhol de História Ultramarina (Lisboa: Junta de Investigações Científicas do Ultramar, 1975), 479.
8. Tim Joyner, Magellan (Camden, Maine: International Marine, 1992), 349.
9. Morrison, European Discovery of America, 369.
10. Quoted in Morrison, European Discovery of America, 449.
