= NZASM 32 Tonner 0-4-2RT =

Type of steam locomotive

NZASM 32 Tonner 0-4-2RT CSAR Class G 0-4-2RT
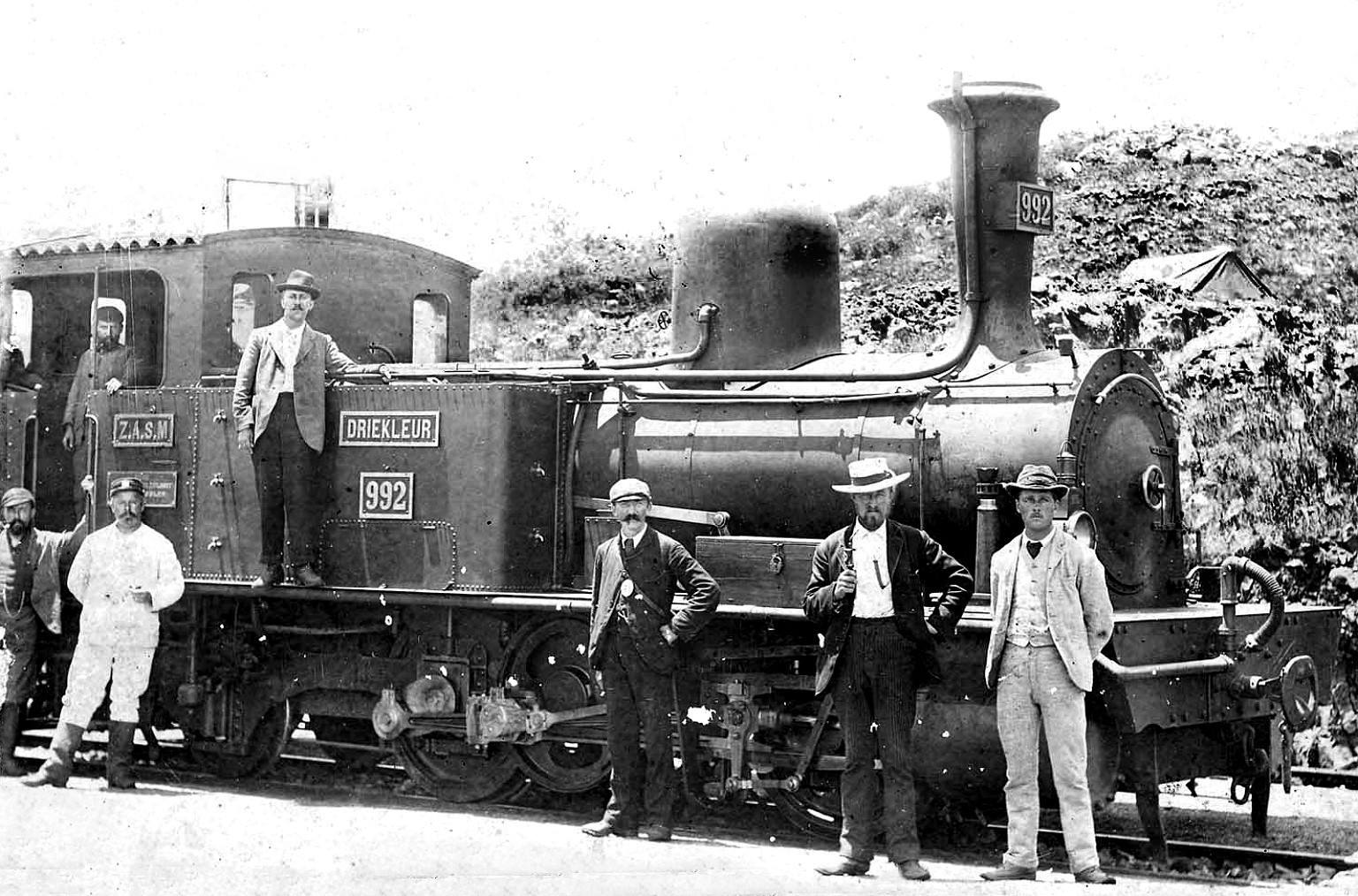
- NZASM 32 Tonner rack locomotive no. 992, c. 1895
Type and origin
- Power type: Steam
- Designer: Maschinenfabrik Esslingen
- Builder: Maschinenfabrik Esslingen
- Serial number: Esslingen 2642, 2643, 2655 & 2844
- Model: NZASM Rack
- Build date: 1894–1897
- Total produced: 4
Specifications
- Configuration
  - Whyte: 0-4-2RT (Olomana)
  - UIC: B1n2t
- Driver: 2nd coupled axle
- Gauge: 3 ft 6 in (1,067 mm) Cape gauge
- Coupled dia.: 38 7/8 in (987 mm)
- Trailing dia.: 31 7/8 in (810 mm)
- Wheelbase: 14 ft 1 5/16 in (4,301 mm)
  - Coupled: 8 ft 1 7/16 in (2,475 mm)
- Length
  - Over couplers: 29 ft 6 in (8,992 mm)
- Height: 12 ft 8 5/32 in (3,865 mm)
- Frame type: Plate
- Axle load: 11 LT 7 cwt (11,530 kg)
  - 1st coupled: 11 LT 6 cwt (11,480 kg)
  - 2nd coupled: 11 LT 7 cwt (11,530 kg)
  - Trailing: 7 LT 1 cwt (7,163 kg)
- Adhesive weight: 22 LT 13 cwt (23,010 kg)
- Loco weight: 29 LT 14 cwt (30,180 kg)
- Fuel type: Coal
- Fuel capacity: 1 LT (1.0 t)
- Water cap.: 550 imp gal (2,500 L)
- Firebox
  - Type: Round-top
  - Grate area: 14.2 sq ft (1.32 m^{2})
- Boiler
  - Pitch: 6 ft 1 7/32 in (1,860 mm)
  - Diameter: 3 ft 8 1/4 in (1,124 mm)
  - Tube plates: 10 ft 6 in (3,200 mm)
  - Small tubes: 156: 1 25/32 in (45 mm)
- Boiler pressure: 180 psi (1,241 kPa)
- Heating surface
  - Firebox: 73 sq ft (6.8 m^{2})
  - Tubes: 760 sq ft (71 m^{2})
  - Total surface: 833 sq ft (77.4 m^{2})
- Cylinders: Two
- Cylinder size: 18 29/32 in (480 mm) bore 24 13/16 in (630 mm) stroke
- Valve gear: Heusinger
- Valve type: Slide
- Couplers: Johnston link-and-pin
Performance figures
- Tractive effort: 27,154 lbf (120.79 kN) @ 75%
Career
- Operators: NZASM; Imperial Military Railways; Central South African Railways; South African Railways
- Class: NZASM 32 Tonner; CSAR Class G
- Number in class: 4
- Numbers: 991–994
- Official name: See table
- Delivered: 1894–1897
- First run: 1894

The NZASM 32 Tonner 0-4-2RT of 1894 was a South African steam locomotive from the pre-Union era in Transvaal.

In 1894 and 1897, the Nederlandsche-Zuid-Afrikaansche Spoorweg-Maatschappij of the Zuid-Afrikaansche Republiek (Transvaal Republic) placed four rack tank locomotives with a 0-4-2 wheel arrangement in service on the rack section between Waterval Onder and Waterval Boven. Since the railway classified its locomotives according to their weight, these engines were known as the 32 Tonners.

== Waterval Onder to Waterval Boven ==
The construction of the railway line from Delagoa Bay to Pretoria was beset with difficulties, both in terms of disease and engineering. Malaria claimed many lives among the construction crews and some of the terrain was mountainous. In the Elandspruit valley, where the Elands River formed a 295-foot-high (90-metre) waterfall, the adjacent cliffs presented a natural barrier to the continuation of the railway from the Eastern Transvaal Lowveld up to the Transvaal Highveld.

In terms of construction, the climb up the escarpment was arguably the most difficult section on the route to be encountered by the railway builders. When the line reached Waterval Onder, they had a choice between a lengthy detour with sharp curves and costly deep cuttings, embankments and viaducts to comply with the agreed upon gradient of 1 in 50 (2%), or a shorter 4 1/2-mile-long (7.2-kilometre) section, which would entail a gradient of 1 in 20 (5%) over a distance of 2.1 miles (3.4 kilometres) in one place, as well as a 233-yard-long (213-metre) tunnel.

The shorter and steeper route was selected. While a gradient of 1 in 20 (5%) is not insurmountable by light trains with orthodox adhesion locomotives, safety and economical considerations led to the decision to install a rack track on the steep section up the escarpment between Waterval Onder and Waterval Boven. The rack track was built to the Riggenbach system which was in use on European mountain railways, with the rack laid between the rails.

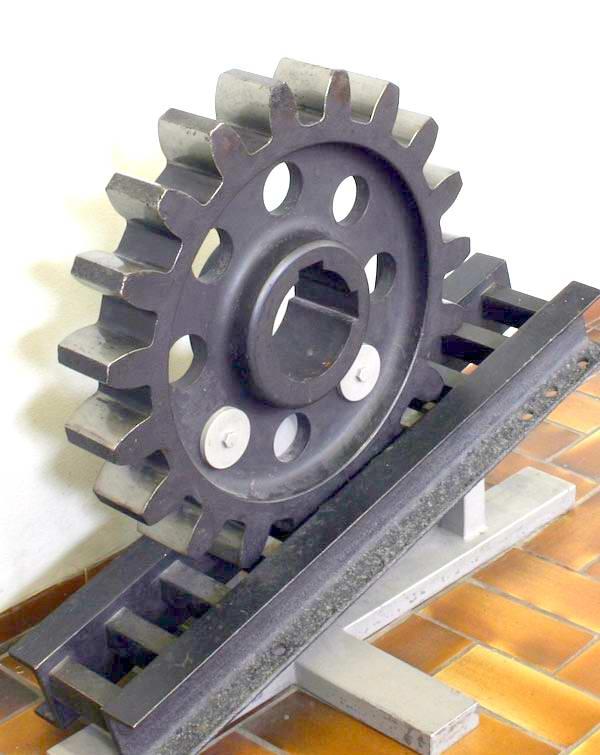
Riggenbach rack system

The Riggenbach rack system used a ladder rack, formed of steel channels connected by square rungs at regular intervals, to engage the pinion wheels of the rack engine. The rungs of the NZASM rack track were spaced 4 inches (102 millimetres) apart. To ensure correct meshing of the gears when entering the rack section, engaging pieces of special section, 6 feet 6 3/4 inches (2,000 millimetres) long and fitted with round-bar rungs, were hinged to each end of the rack, supported by a spiral spring underneath. When the rack engine made contact with the hinged section and the gear wheels did not mesh with the rack correctly, the engaging section would be pressed down until correct meshing was accomplished.

== Manufacturer ==
The line from Delagoa Bay and up the escarpment to Waterval Boven was completed on 20 June 1894. To work on the rack section, the Nederlandsche-Zuid-Afrikaansche Spoorweg-Maatschappij (NZASM) ordered three 0-4-2 rack tank locomotives from Emil Kessler's Maschinenfabrik Esslingen. The three locomotives were delivered in 1894, numbered in the range from 991 to 993. A fourth locomotive, no. 994, was ordered in 1897 and was identical to the other three, except that it had a coal bunker and water tanks with larger capacities, which made it heavier. Since the NZASM classified its locomotives according to their weight, the rack locomotives were known as 32 Tonners. In addition to being numbered, they were all named as well, with the names and numbers cast in brass and mounted on their tank sides.

== Characteristics ==
The rack locomotive had plate frames, arranged outside the coupled wheels, and was equipped with the Heusinger von Waldegg version of Walschaerts valve gear. The pinion for the rack was mounted between the coupled wheels, just forward of the driving axle. The pinion axle was coupled to the drivers through side rods, with the connecting rods coupled directly to crank disks which were mounted on the ends of the axle, outside the frames. These crank disks were grooved to act as brake drums.

A second free-turning pinion wheel which also meshed with the rack, was mounted on the leading driving axle. It had grooved brake drums bolted to each side and acted as a brake only, with the brakes being applied by a hand mechanism from the footplate. The brakes on the driving and free-turning pinion wheels were separately controlled, while the vacuum brake gear on the engine was only used to control the brakes of the train.

The main steam cylinders were also used as brakes on the rack section. During descents, the 32 Tonner would be put into reverse with the steam regulator closed and a three-way valve in the exhaust pipe under the smokebox would be closed when brake power was required. The exhaust passages would then be isolated from the blast pipe and air would be admitted to the steam chests. The air would enter the cylinders though the exhaust ports and therefore reversed operations in the cylinders. Used air would be exhausted through the steam inlet ports back into the steam pipe, from where it was led to the rear of the engine by a 1 1/2-inch diameter (38-millimetre) branch pipe. This branch pipe had another valve, by which the driver could regulate the amount of compression in the cylinders. Small amounts of water could be admitted into the cylinders to keep them cool.

== Service ==
=== NZASM ===
The four rack locomotives were all shedded at Waterval Onder. When working a train up to Waterval Boven, a 32 Tonner would be coupled to the rear end of a train as banking engine. When working a descending train, the order of assembly was reversed, with the train's locomotive at the rear end and the rack locomotive in front to act as brake. Loads of 120 to 140 long tons (122 to 142 tonnes) could be handled in this manner.

=== Imperial Military Railways ===
All railway operations in the two Boer Republics, the Zuid-Afrikaansche Republiek and the Orange Free State, were taken over by the Imperial Military Railways (IMR) in 1899, during the Second Boer War.

All four locomotives survived the war.

=== Central South African Railways ===
At the end of the war in 1902, when the IMR was transformed into the Central South African Railways (CSAR), the four 32 Tonners were designated Class G, but retained their original NZASM engine numbers. They remained in banking service on the section between Waterval Boven and Waterval Onder until 1908, when a new alignment with easier gradients, including a new tunnel, was constructed and the rack section could be abandoned.

The original tunnel's portal coordinates are 25.638170°S 30.346637°E (southeastern portal) and 25.636465°S 30.345353°E (northwestern portal). The new 1908 tunnel's portal coordinates are 25.633522°S 30.349168°E (eastern portal) and 25.634496°S 30.345066°E (western portal).

=== South African Railways ===
When the Union of South Africa was established on 31 May 1910, the three Colonial government railways (Cape Government Railways, Natal Government Railways and CSAR) were united under a single administration to control and administer the railways, ports and harbours of the Union. Although the South African Railways and Harbours came into existence in 1910, the actual classification and renumbering of all the rolling stock of the three constituent railways was only implemented with effect from 1 January 1912.

In 1912, these four locomotives were taken onto the SAR roster as unclassified engines, since they were considered obsolete. Since they were excluded from the SAR renumbering schedules, they retained their NZASM engine numbers until they were eventually scrapped.

== Names and works numbers ==
The 32 Tonner engine numbers, names, works numbers and years built are listed in the table.

NZASM 32 Tonner 0-4-2T
NZASM no.	Name	Year built	Works no.
991	Vierkleur	1894	2642
992	Driekleur	1894	2643
993	Republiek	1894	2655
994	Vaderland	1897	2844

== Illustration ==
The main picture shows no. 992 Driekleur while the following pictures serve to illustrate the larger coal bunker on the fourth engine.

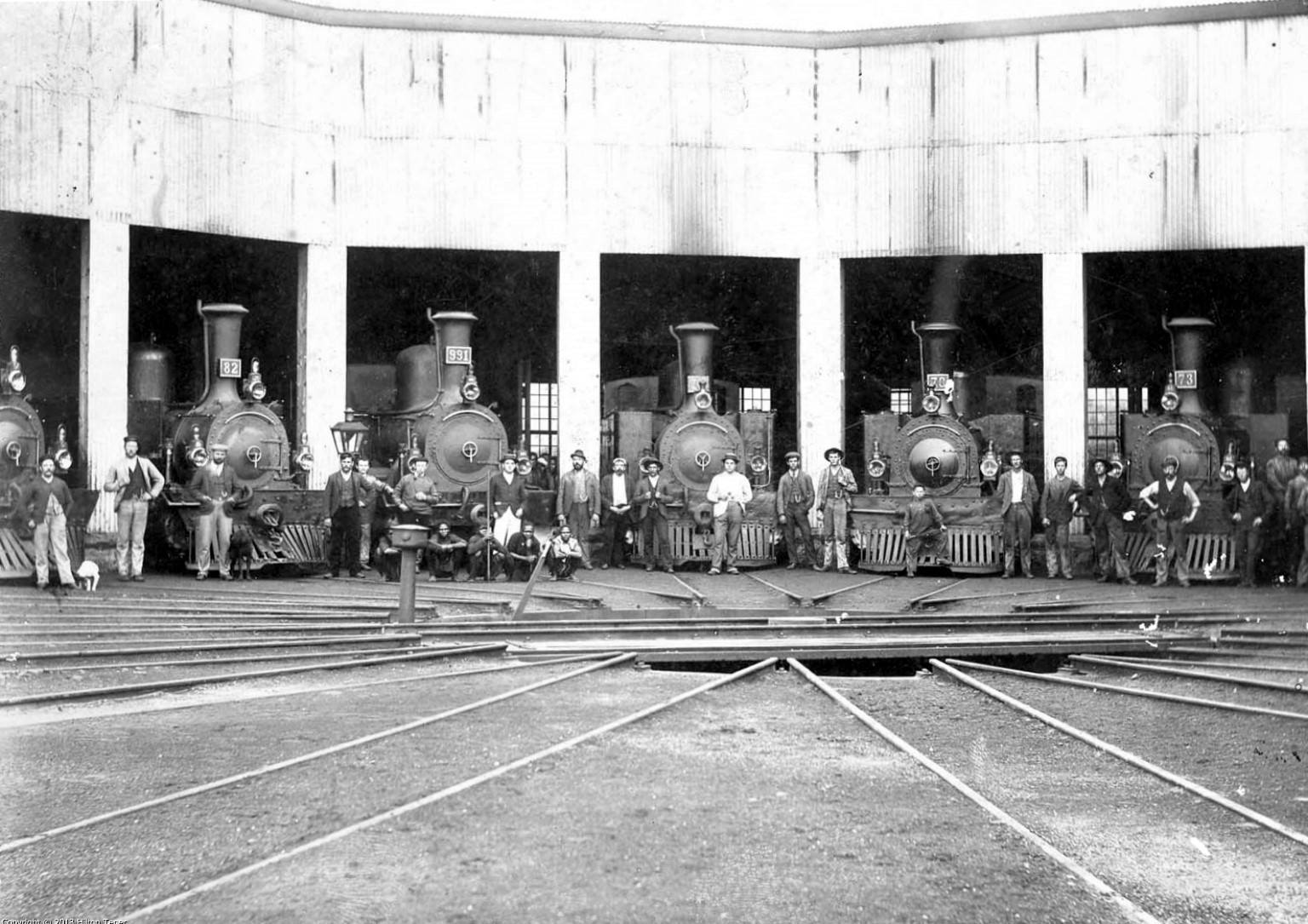
No. 991 in Waterval-Boven roundhouse with 46 Tonners, c. 1895

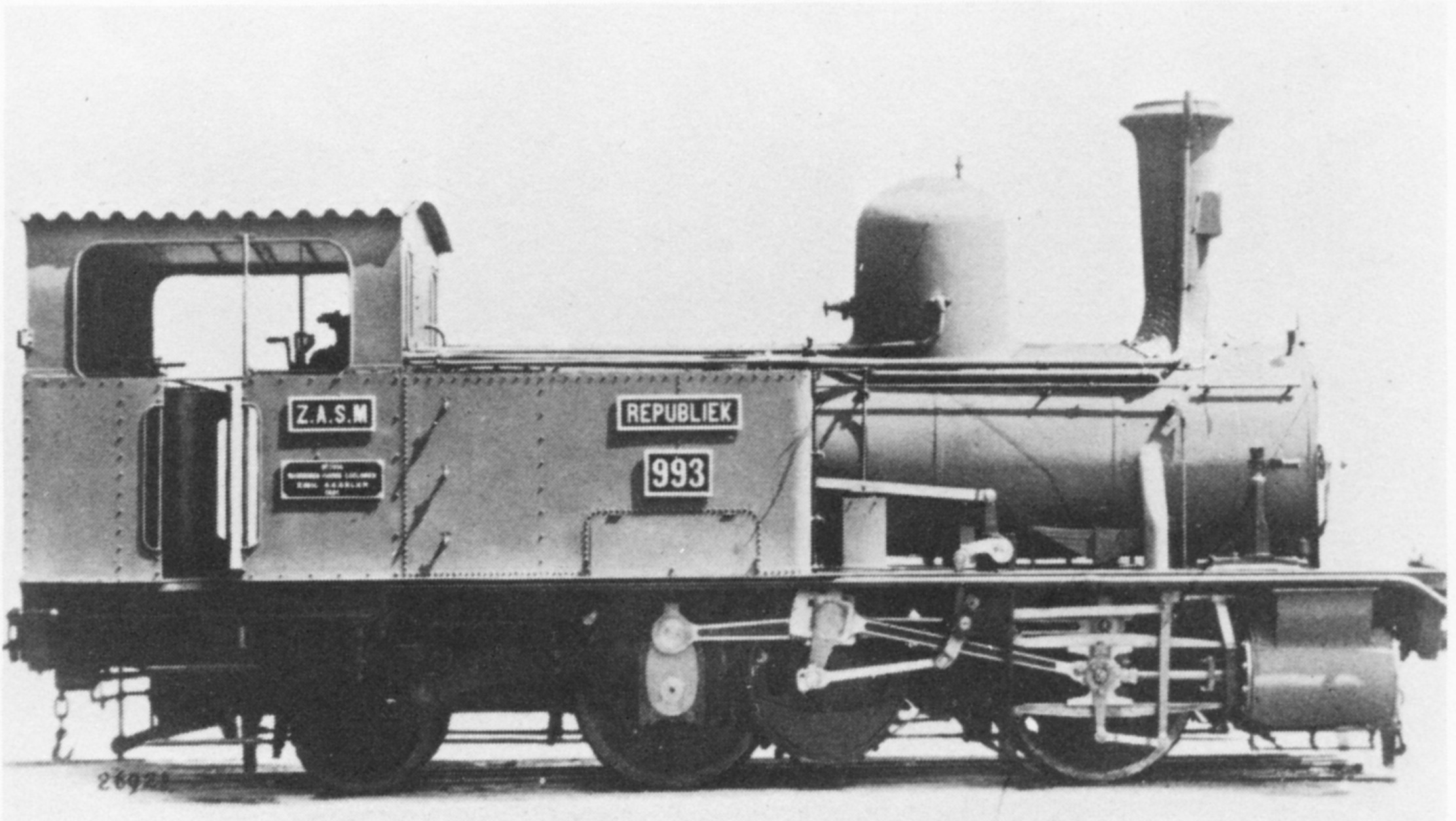
No. 993 Republiek with its small coal bunker and side-tanks, c. 1895

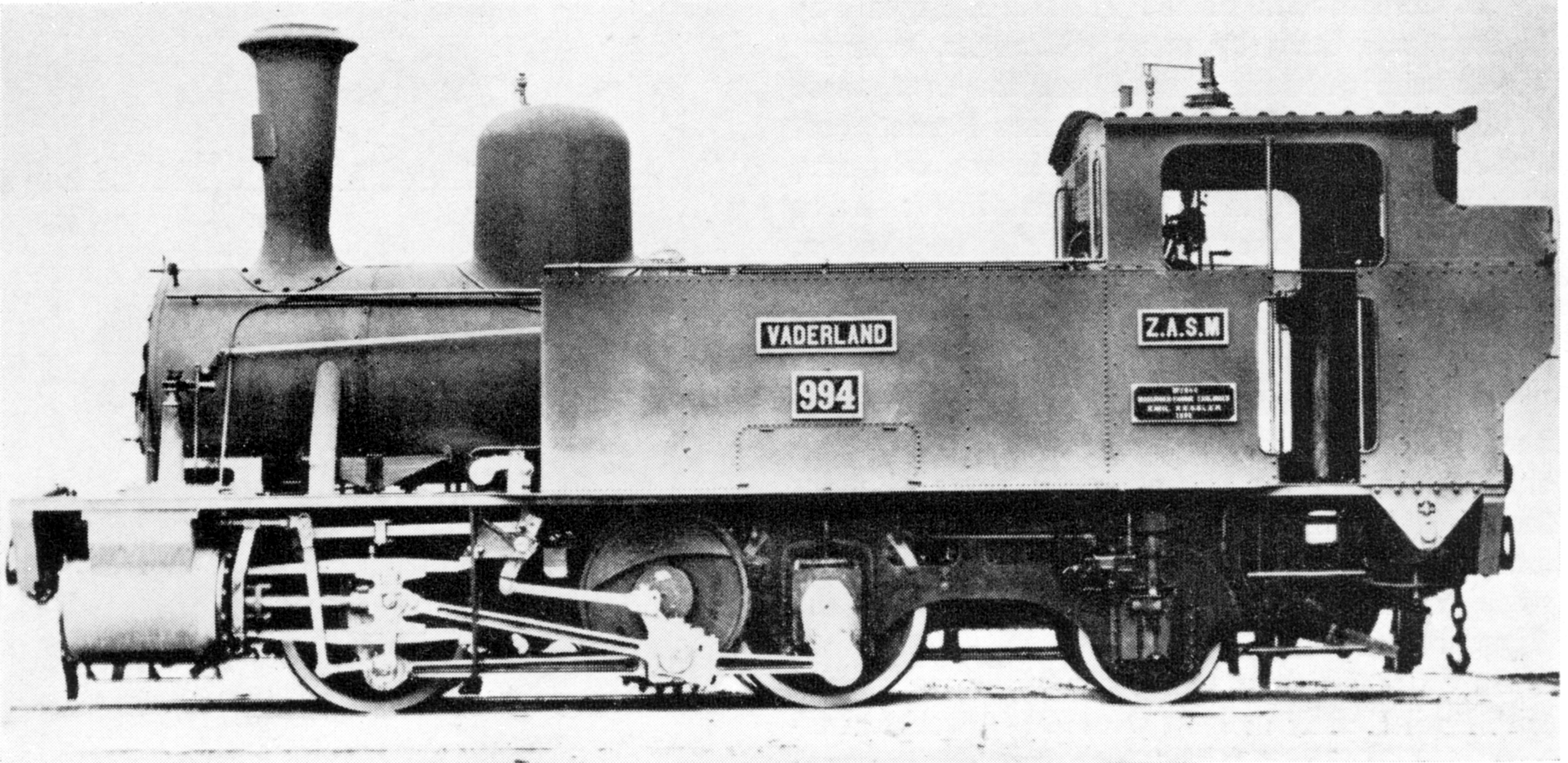
No. 994 Vaderland with a larger coal bunker and side-tanks, c. 1895
