= Cape Government Railways Karoo Class locomotives =

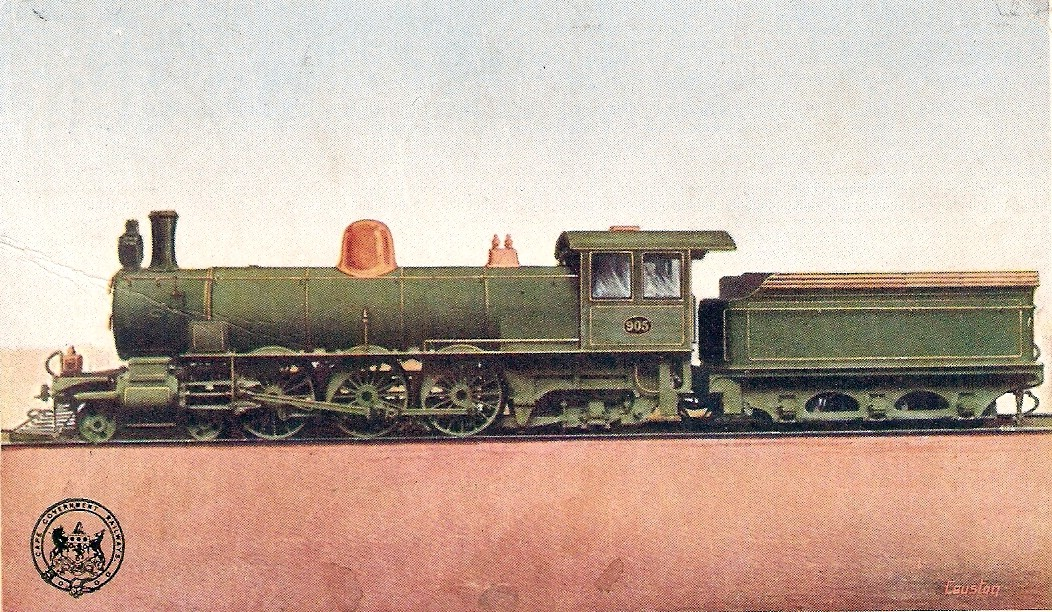
CGR Karoo Class 4-6-2 of 1904

The Cape Government Railways Karoo Class locomotives include three locomotive models, all designated Karoo Class, and one more which entered service shortly after the South African Railways renumbering and classification program came into effect in 1912.

When the Union of South Africa was established on 31 May 1910, the three Colonial government railways (Cape Government Railways, Natal Government Railways and Central South African Railways) were united under a single administration to control and administer the railways, ports and harbours of the Union. The Cape Government Railways Karoo Class locomotives were grouped into four different sub-classes on the new South African Railways.

- CGR Karoo Class 4-6-2 1903 (SAR Class 5A).
- CGR Karoo Class 4-6-2 1904 (SAR Class 5B).
- CGR Compound Karoo 4-6-2 Experimental (SAR Class Experimental 1).
- SAR Classes 5 and 5R.
