= Francis Henry Hill Guillemard =

Reader of geography at Cambridge University (1852–1933)

Francis Henry Hill Guillemard (12 September 1852 – 23 December 1933) was an English traveller, writer and naturalist. He was the first lecturer of geography at Cambridge, although he resigned without having ever lectured.

== Biography ==
Guillemard was born on September 12th, 1852 in Eltham, Kent, and was the fifth son of Anne Pierce Guillemard (née Upham) and Dr. Isaac Guillemard, a physician. His father died a few months after he was born. The Guillemard family had Huguenot origins, coming from Poitou and Bolbec and settling in the Greater London area following persecution in the seventeenth century.

He took an interest in natural history and travel at an early age, aspiring to be a traveller and a doctor in his youth and writing an article on pigeons published in the Boys' Weekly at age 14 in 1866. He was unable to attend Rugby School owing to poor health, and instead was educated by a private tutor between 1866 and 1868 before then attending cram schools in Richmond and Blackheath. Guillemard was admitted to Gonville and Caius College, Cambridge in 1870, where he studied medicine under lecturers such as Sir George Edward Paget. During his undergraduate career, he went on expeditions to Orkney to study birds and also traveled to the Balkans and Lapland in 1873. Guillemard graduated with a BA in 1874 and obtained his MA in 1877.

He attended natural history auctions regularly, particularly those at the auction house operated by the collector and agent Samuel Stevens, Stevens' Auction Rooms, where he encountered figures such as the zoologist Alfred Newton, ornithologist Howard Saunders, and other notable naturalists of the period. In 1876 he joined the Royal Geographical Society. The same year, he traveled to Central Africa, and in 1877 and 1878 embarked on an expedition to the Limpopo River and Elands River in South Africa, where he did ornithological work. He also traveled to Madeira and the Canary Islands. He served as a doctor in the First Boer War, publishing On the Endemic Haematoria of Hot Climates, caused by the Presence of Bilharzia haematobia as his thesis for his Doctor of Medicine degree upon his return in 1881.

In 1882, he served as the naturalist aboard the schooner yacht Marchesa, which embarked upon a three-year voyage to East Asia and Southeast Asia. Leaving England in January 1882, the Marchesa traveled for three years through Sri Lanka, Singapore, Taiwan, the Ryukyu Islands, Japan, the Kamschatka Peninsula, Bering Island, China, Hong Kong, New Guinea, and the Malay Archipelago. The ship arrived back in England in 1885 with zoological and botanical collections from these areas. Guillemard returned to Cambridge and wrote The Cruise of the "Marchesa" to Kamschatka and New Guinea with Notices of Formosa, Liu-Kiu, and Various Islands of the Malay Archipelago, a two-volume work about the voyage of the Marchesa, which was published in 1886 and became a popular travel book.

In 1887, Guillemard was a co-founder of the Cyprus Exploration Fund and inspected sites for archaeological excavation. He was elected to serve as the first reader in geography at Cambridge on June 12th, 1888 while collecting mammalogical specimens on an expedition to Cyprus with W.H. Mallock. While he reportedly made preparations for the position, he was ill-suited to the task of lecturing and departed to winter in Madeira. When he missed the beginning of the Michaelmas term and was asked to return and lecture, he instead resigned.

In 1890, Guillemard wrote a book on Ferdinand Magellan and his travels, The Life of Ferdinand Magelland, and the First Circumnavigation of the Globe, 1480-1521. In 1892, he accompanied British diplomat Charles Evan Smith on the British mission to the court of Morocco in 1892, later traveling through Europe before returning to Cambridge. He worked as general editor of the Cambridge University Press's county geography publications (Cambridge Geographical Series) and as an editor for several other naturalist and travel writers, most notably ethnographer Mary Kingsley's works on West Africa, Jonas Jonsson Stadling's Through Siberia, Odoardo Beccari's Wanderings in the Great Forests of Borneo, and geographer Clements Markham's Lands of Silence. He edited and rewrote the Malay Archipelago segments of the Stanford's Compendium.

He married his cousin Katharine Stephanie Guillemard on June 25th, 1890, but they separated after a dozen years and had no children. In 1898, he moved into the Old Mill House in Trumpington. He was known to be passionate about the property's garden and about his private art and archaeology collections. Guillemard died on December 23rd, 1933 at the age of 81 in Trumpington, Cambridge.
