= Christopher de Haro =

Castilian-Portuguese merchant known for backing Magellan and Elcano's voyages

Cristóbal de Haro was a Castilian financier and merchant from Burgos, famous for having provided funding for the Magellan-Elcano expedition.

Born in Burgos, Haro was based in Lisbon starting in 1505. After 1513, he became upset with the Portuguese crown and returned to Castile, plotting with Portuguese exiles Ferdinand Magellan and Ruy Faleiro and with the Spanish minister Juan Rodríguez de Fonseca an expedition to the Spice Islands sailing westward.

As a financier and representative of the Fuggers he provided a quarter of the financial backing to Magellan's 1519 voyage, which failed to conquer the Spice Islands but resulted in the first circumnavigation around the world by Juan Sebastián Elcano.

Cristóbal's brother Diego de Haro headed a commercial firm based in Antwerp. A daughter of Diego, Frances, was married to Maximilianus of Transylvania (Maximilianus Transylvanus), who wrote the first account of Magellan's voyage, published in 1523. Transylvanus pointed out that Cristóbal de Haro had assisted Magellan and Faleiro considerably in presenting their proposals before the Spanish royal counselors. Haro also helped finance subsequent Spanish expeditions to the Spice Islands: those commanded by Estevao Gomes in 1524, by Jofre de Loaysa in 1525 and by Diego García in 1528.

He was buried in the church of San Lesmes in Burgos, next to his wife Catalina de Ayala. The tomb is decorated with the coat of arms that King Charles granted him, with Magellan's five ships, the pillars of Hercules and spices.
