= Elands River =

Elands River may refer to any of the following rivers in South Africa:

- Elands River (Mpumalanga), a tributary of the Crocodile River (Mpumalanga), part of the Komati River basin, famous for its waterfalls
- Elands River (North West), a tributary of the Crocodile River, part of the Limpopo River basin
- Elands River (Olifants), a tributary of the Olifants River, part of the Limpopo River basin
- Elands River (Swartkops), a tributary of the Swartkops River in the Eastern Cape
- Elands River (Tsitsikamma), a small river in the Tsitsikamma Region
- Elands River (Umkomazi), a tributary of the Umkomazi River, KwaZulu-Natal
- Elands River (Western Cape), a tributary of the Riviersonderend River, part of the Breede River basin
- Elands River (Wilge), a tributary of the Wilge River, part of the Vaal River basin

Other uses:

- Battle of Elands River (1900), a battle fought by the Elands River (North West)
- Battle of Elands River (1901), fought at Elands River Poort, a mountain pass located in the Karoo, 24 km to the NNW of Tarkastad
