= Elands River (Mpumalanga) =

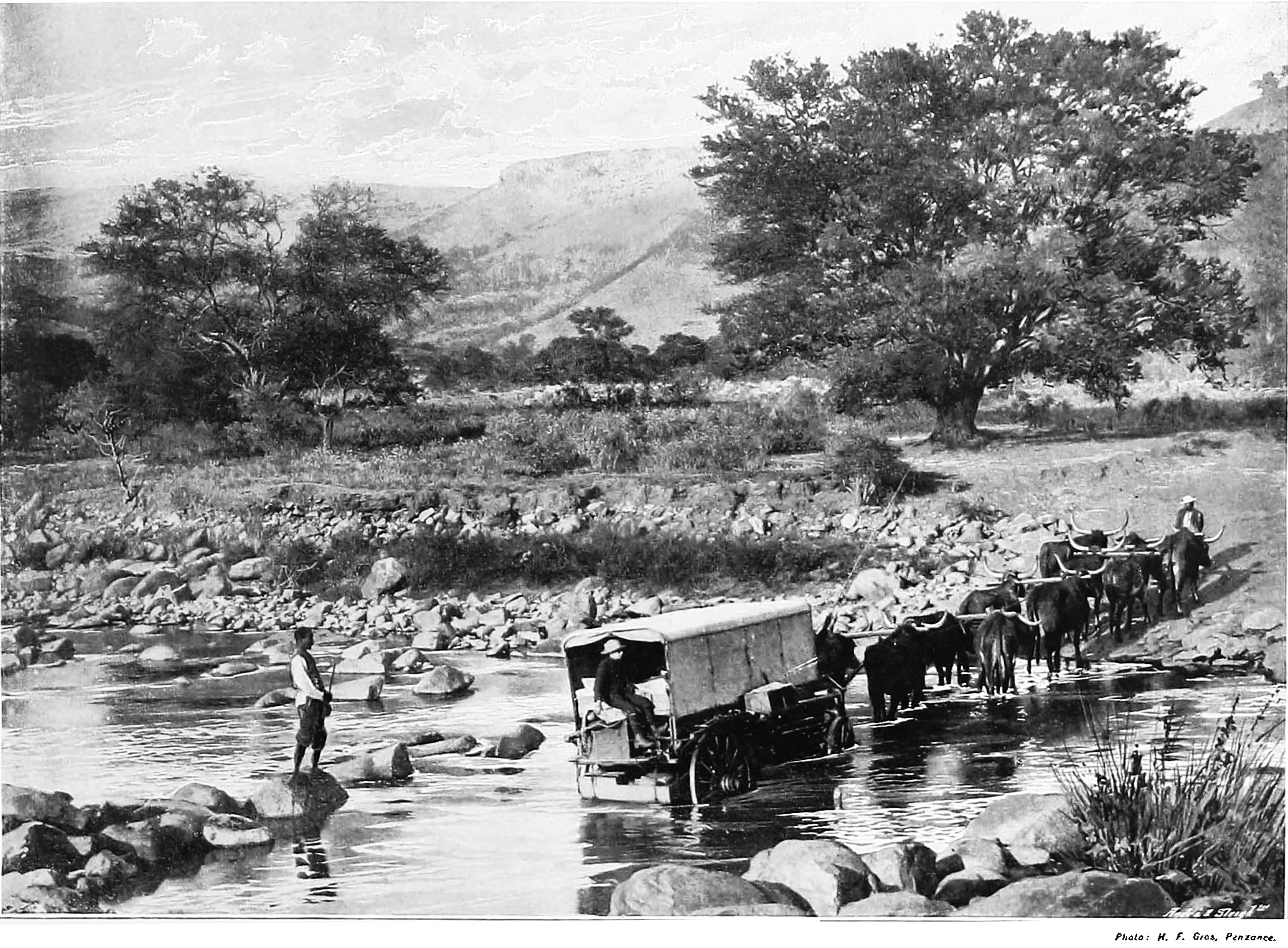
- Wagon fording a drift in the Elands, late 19th century

- Location of the Elands River mouth
- Etymology: Named after the Common Eland (Taurotragus oryx)

Location
- Country: South Africa
- Province: Mpumalanga

Physical characteristics
- Source
  - location: Near Machadodorp
  - elevation: 1,046 m (3,432 ft)
- Mouth: Crocodile River (Mpumalanga)
  - location: Near Montrose Falls
  - coordinates: 25°27′17″S 30°42′58″E
  - elevation: 772 m (2,533 ft)

Elands River is a river of the Komati River basin in Mpumalanga province, South Africa.

This river is known for the Elands River Falls, located between Waterval Boven and Waterval Onder. These fall 70 m in one drop, and are close to the NZASM tunnel. Also not far from another historical site called the Krugerhof, the last residence of President Stephanus Johannes Paulus Kruger in the South African Republic (ZAR), where there is a Museum.

The river originates near the town of Machadodorp, in the Highveld Zone of Mpumalanga, and after passing over a complex waterfall, joins the right bank of the Crocodile River.

== Song ==
Rhodesian folk singer John Edmond wrote the song "The Siege at Elands River" about the Second Boer War.

== See also ==
- List of waterfalls of South Africa
- List of rivers of South Africa
- Elands River (disambiguation)
