= Port Elizabeth Harbour 0-4-0ST =

Type of steam locomotive

Port Elizabeth Harbour 0-4-0ST CGR 0-4-0ST 1894 South African 0-4-0ST 1894
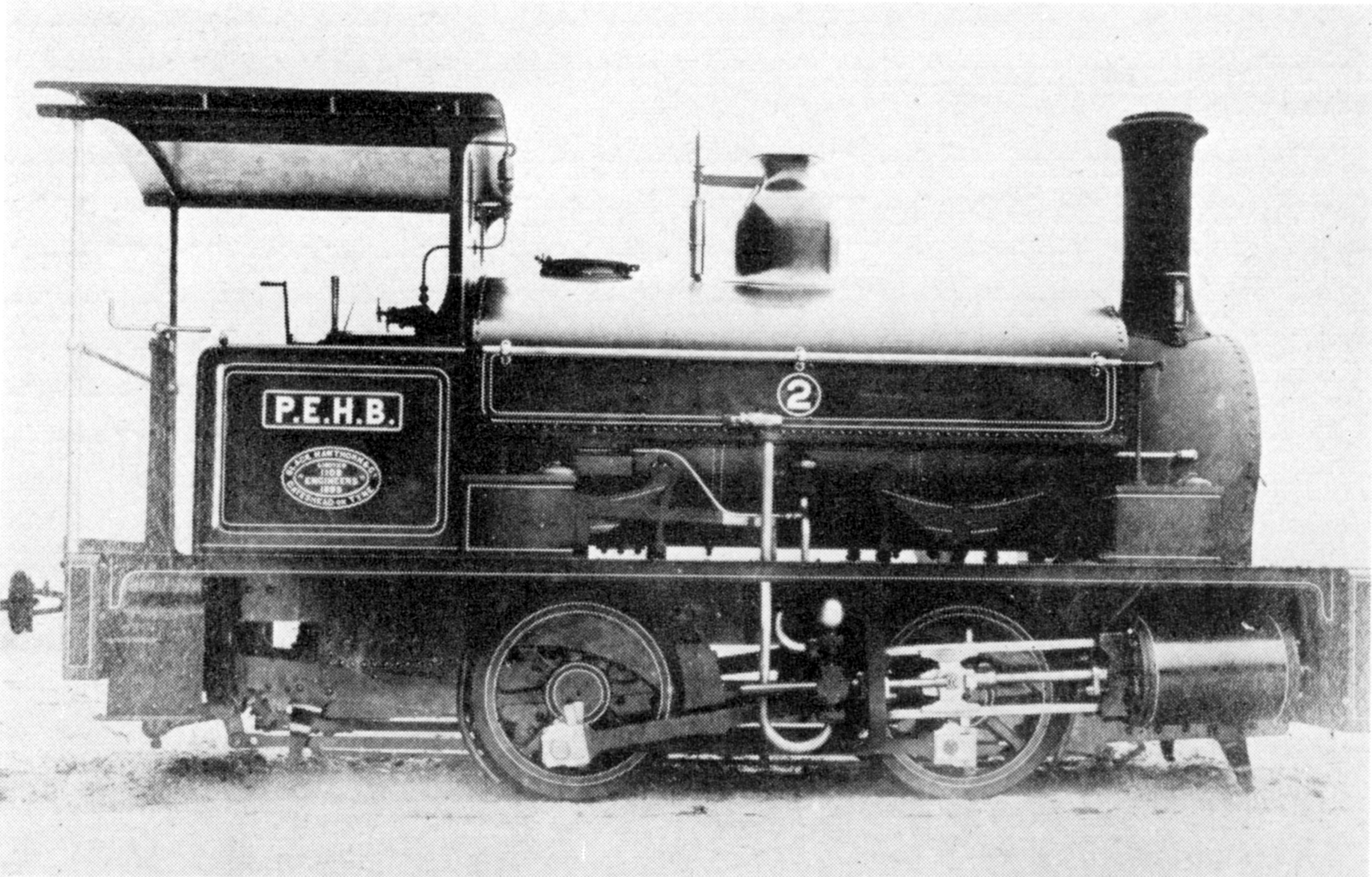
- Port Elizabeth Harbour's no. 2, CGR no. 1016, SAR no. 01016, c. 1894, built by Black, Hawthorn & Co.
Type and origin
- Power type: Steam
- Designer: Black, Hawthorn & Co
- Builder: Black, Hawthorn & Co; Chapman and Furneaux; Hudswell, Clarke & Co; Fox, Walker and Company; Lowca Engineering
- Serial number: BH 1104, 1108–1109, 1126; CF 1207–1208, 1213–1214; HC 616–617
- Build date: 1894–1902
- Total produced: 8
Specifications
- Configuration
  - Whyte: 0-4-0ST
  - UIC: Bn2t
- Driver: 2nd coupled axle
- Gauge: 3 ft 6 in (1,067 mm) Cape gauge
- Coupled dia.: 36 in (914 mm)
- Wheelbase: 5 ft 6 in (1,676 mm)
- Length
  - Over couplers: 21 ft 3 in (6,477 mm)
  - Over body: 16 ft 9 in (5,105 mm)
- Height: 10 ft 5 5/8 in (3,191 mm)
- Fuel type: Coal
- Fuel capacity: 1 LT (1.0 t)
- Water cap.: 400 imp gal (1,820 L)
- Firebox
  - Type: Round-top
  - Grate area: 6.2 sq ft (0.58 m^{2})
- Boiler
  - Pitch: 5 ft 3 in (1,600 mm)
  - Tube plates: 8 ft 5 1/2 in (2,578 mm)
  - Small tubes: 69: 2 in (51 mm)
- Boiler pressure: 130 psi (896 kPa)
- Safety valve: Salter
- Heating surface
  - Firebox: 39 sq ft (3.6 m^{2})
  - Tubes: 317 sq ft (29.5 m^{2})
  - Total surface: 356 sq ft (33.1 m^{2})
- Cylinders: Two
- Cylinder size: 12 in (305 mm) bore 18 in (457 mm) stroke
- Valve gear: Stephenson
- Couplers: Johnston link-and-pin
Performance figures
- Tractive effort: 7,020 lbf (31.2 kN) @ 75%
Career
- Operators: Port Elizabeth Harbour Board; Kowie Railway; Cape Government Railways; South African Railways; Rhodesia Railways
- Number in class: 8
- Numbers: PEHB 1-4 (D-G), K-N; CGR 1015-1022; SAR 01015-01022
- Delivered: 1894–1902
- First run: 1894

The Port Elizabeth Harbour 0-4-0ST of 1894 was a South African steam locomotive from the pre-Union era in the Cape of Good Hope.

Between 1894 and 1902, eight 0-4-0ST locomotives entered shunting service at the Port Elizabeth Harbour. They were taken onto the Cape Government Railways roster in 1908 and all of them were still in service when the South African Railways classification and renumbering was implemented in 1912.

== Manufacturers ==
In 1894 and 1895, four 0-4-0ST locomotives were delivered to the Port Elizabeth Harbour Board (PEHB) from Black, Hawthorn & Company. They were numbered in the range from 1 to 4 and placed in service as harbour shunters at Port Elizabeth Harbour. By 1901, their numbers 1 to 4 had been replaced by the letters D to G.

During 1896, the firm of Black, Hawthorn was taken over by Chapman and Furneaux, who delivered another two of these locomotives in 1901. Instead of being numbered, these were lettered K and L.

The firm of Chapman and Furneaux closed down in 1902. Two locomotives which had been ordered from them in February 1902, order numbers 1213 and 1214, were built instead by Hudswell, Clarke & Company, ex works in July 1902 with works numbers 616 and 617. These two were lettered M and N.

== Service ==
=== Kowie Railway ===
In 1904, one of these locomotives, ex no. 4/G, was sent to Port Alfred on loan to the Kowie Railway Company, who used it as yard engine in Port Alfred station. While there, the name plates from the then recently withdrawn 4 ft 8 1/2 in (1,435 mm) broad gauge engine Aid of 1878 were affixed to the saddle-tank of no. 4, and it became the engine Aid reincarnated. Many people erroneously believed that it was one-and-the-same locomotive, to the extent that it later became accepted as fact. The locomotive was returned to Port Elizabeth in 1910.

=== Cape Government Railways ===
In terms of Act 38 of 1908, the Cape Government Railways (CGR) became responsible for the administration of the three major harbours in the Cape of Good Hope with effect from 1 January 1909. The locomotives were therefore all taken onto the CGR roster and renumbered in the range from 1015 to 1022.

=== South African Railways ===
When the Union of South Africa was established on 31 May 1910, the three Colonial government railways (CGR, Natal Government Railways and Central South African Railways) were united under a single administration to control and administer the railways, ports and harbours of the Union. Although the South African Railways and Harbours came into existence in 1910, the actual classification and renumbering of all the rolling stock of the three constituent railways was only implemented with effect from 1 January 1912.

In 1912, these locomotives were considered obsolete by the South African Railways (SAR) and renumbered by having the numeral "0" prefixed to their existing numbers.

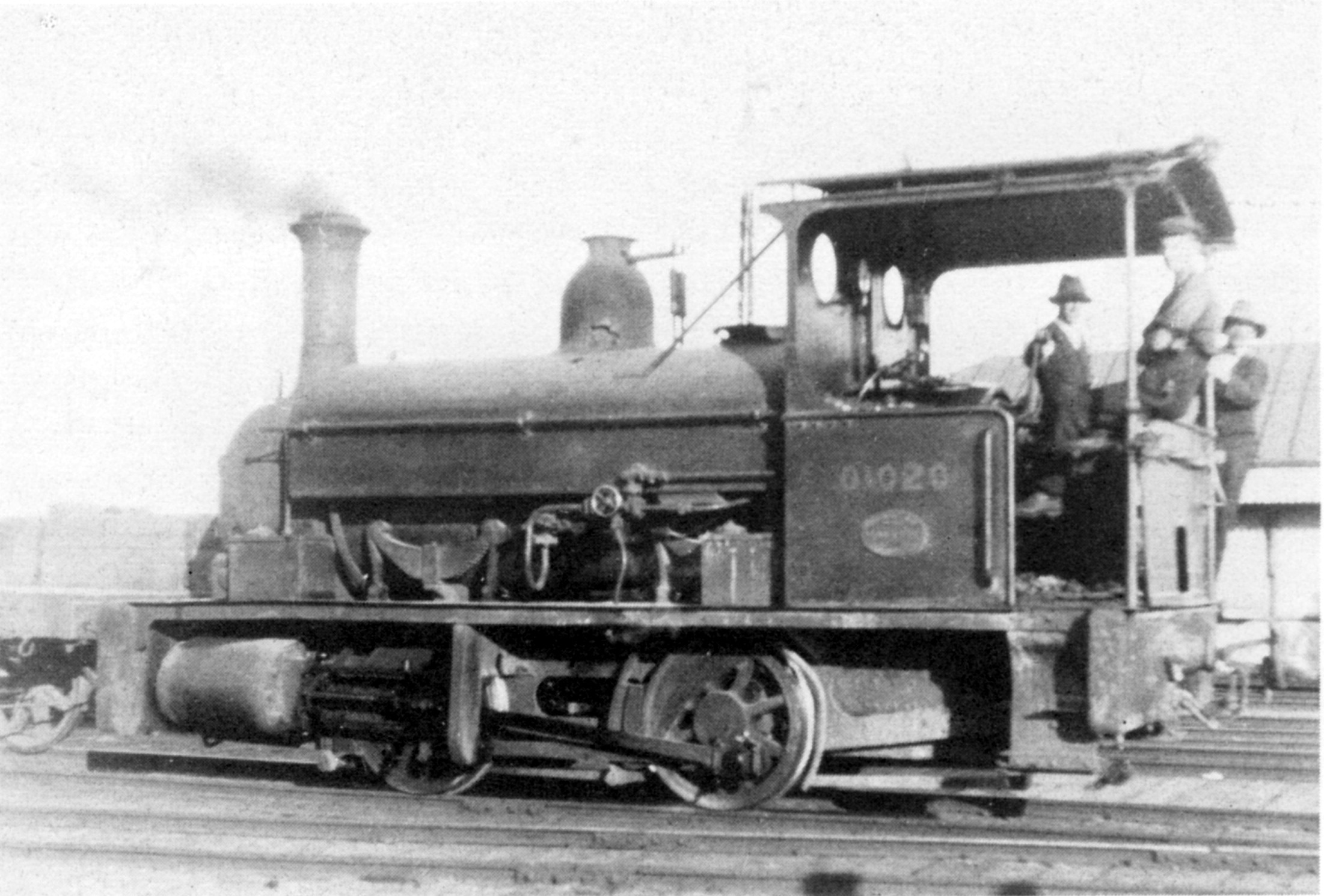
No. 01020, ex engine L, by Chapman & Furneaux

In June 1914, SAR no. 01017 was transferred to Mosselbaai Harbour. The rest remained in service in Port Elizabeth Harbour.

=== Rhodesia Railways ===
In July 1929, SAR no. 01021 was sold to Rhodesia Railways (RR), where it was given RR number 5. The locomotive never actually left South Africa, since it was purchased for use as shop engine at the RR's Mafeking Workshop, staffed by SAR personnel. The engine was eventually scrapped in 1940.

== Locomotives no. 1012 to 1014 ==
In the classification and renumbering lists of the SAR, published in 1912, three additional 0-4-0T locomotives of uncertain origin are listed as Port Elizabeth Harbour locomotives. Two of them are listed as CGR numbers 1012 and 1013, built by Peckett and Sons, while the third is listed as CGR no. 1014, built by Lowca Engineering Company. Also considered obsolete by the SAR, they were also renumbered with a numeral "0" prefixed to their CGR numbers.

These locomotives are shown here solely for the sake of completeness and because their PEHB letters and CGR and SAR numbers immediately precede those of the eight locomotives which are the subject of this article. It has since been discovered that the builder's details about the first two of these locomotives in the Rolling Stock Register was incorrect, possibly as a result of the locomotives getting equipped with replacement parts, such as new boilers bearing the markings of a manufacturer other than the original locomotive builder.

- The first locomotive, PEHB A, then CGR no. 1012, then SAR no. 01012, was built by Fox, Walker and Company, a predecessor of Peckett and Sons, as a Class W 0-4-0ST, ex-works in December 1876 and landed in Port Elizabeth in April 1877. Its erroneous description as a Peckett locomotive could possibly be as a result of the Peckett name appearing on replaced parts on the locomotive.

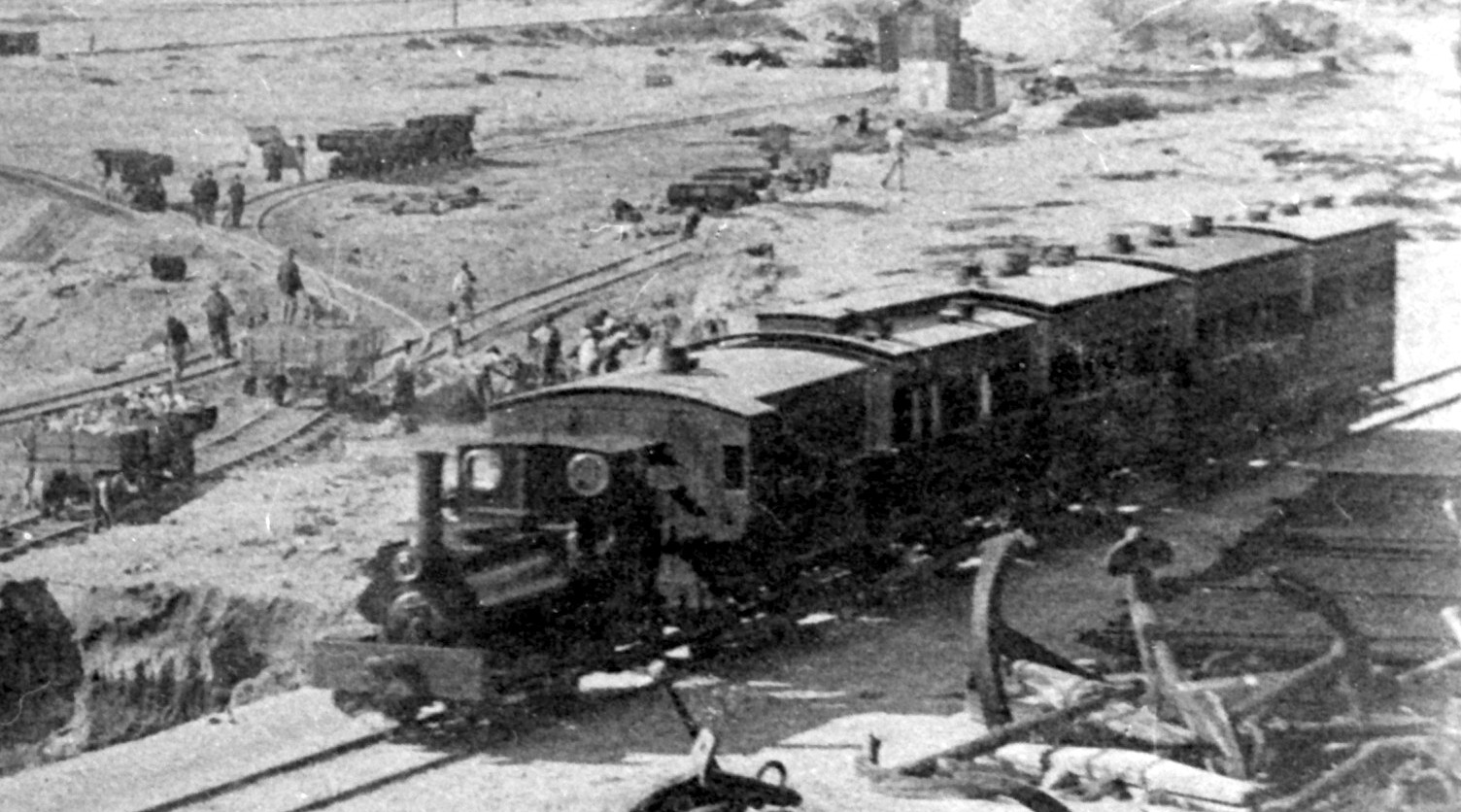
PEHB engine B, ex Despatch Brickmaking & Woolwashing Co.

- How the first two locomotives both came to be described as Peckett locomotives in the 1912 renumbering lists is not known, since no records have been found of another Fox, Walker or Peckett locomotive which could have ended up on the Port Elizabeth Harbour Board roster. The second locomotive, PEHB B, then CGR no. 1013, then SAR no. 01013, was more likely to be a 0-4-0ST engine that was originally delivered to the Despatch Brickmaking & Woolwashing Company in Port Elizabeth, built in 1881 by Andrew Barclay Sons & Co. The Port Elizabeth Harbour Board Report for 1903 refers to the purchase of a small tank locomotive from the Despatch Brick Works. Since Andrew Barclay occasionally employed Ogee shaped tanks and since no other tank locomotives of this shape ever came to South Africa, it can be safely assumed that the engine depicted is the Despatch engine.
- The third locomotive, PEHB C, then CGR no. 1014, then SAR no. 01014, is believed to be Lowca Engineering's works no. 232 of 1898, which initially went to the Table Bay Harbour Board (TBHB), where it is believed to have been the TBHB's second no. 3 which was probably transferred to Port Elizabeth before 1901.

== Works numbers ==
The builders, works numbers, order dates, original numbers and letterings, renumbering and disposition of the Port Elizabeth Harbour Board 0-4-0ST locomotives of 1894 are listed in the table. The Fox, Walker and Lowca locomotives are included in the table.

Port Elizabeth Harbour Board 0-4-0ST of 1894
Builder	Works no.	Order date	Loco no.	Loco letter	CGR no.	SAR no.	Transfer	sold or scrapped
Fox, Walker	330	1876–12		A	1012	01012		1918–01 Uitenhage
Andrew Barclay	234	1881		B	1013	01013	Ex Despatch Brickmaking & Woolwashing Co.	1912–05 Uitenhage
Lowca Engineering	232	1898		C	1014	01014	From TBHB pre-1901	1913–06 Uitenhage
Black, Hawthorn	1104	1894–08	1	D	1015	01015		1932–02 Uitenhage
Black, Hawthorn	1108	1894–11	2	E	1016	01016		1930–01 Uitenhage
Black, Hawthorn	1109	1894–11	3	F	1017	01017	1914–06 Mosselbaai	1920–12 Uitenhage
Black, Hawthorn	1126	1895–09	4	G	1018	01018	Port Alfred 1904–1910	1928–08 Uitenhage
Chapman & Furneaux	1207	1900–12		K	1019	01019		1921–08 Uitenhage
Chapman & Furneaux	1208	1900–12		L	1020	01020		1929–09 Uitenhage
Hudswell, Clarke	1213/616	1902–02		M	1021	01021		1929–07 to RR
Hudswell, Clarke	1214/617	1902–02		N	1022	01022		1919–03 Uitenhage
