= Owl Club =

The Owl Club of Cape Town, South Africa (formed in 1894), is a social meeting place for all those with an interest in the arts and sciences. The monthly meetings include an evening of fellowship, fine dining, stimulating conversation, talks by acclaimed speakers and musical entertainment.

== Background to the name ==
It was the wife of the first Secretary, C.G. Lowinger, who coined the name. Four founder members sat in the twilight, in the garden of the Lowinger's house in Cape Town, discussing what the Club should be called. And then: "… Into the gathered darkness came Mrs Lowinger with the natural inquiry, ‘Why are you all sitting here in the dark like a lot of owls?’ ‘The very name for our Club!’ they cried, and The Owl Club it was called and remains …”. The first formal meeting of The Owl Club took place in October 1894.

== Location of the Club ==
Down the years, The Owl Club has met in various venues in Cape Town. Between 1975 and 1998 it met at the Cape Town Club (formerly the City & Civil Service Club) in Queen Victoria Street. Since 1998, the venue for meetings has been the Kelvin Grove Club in Newlands, Cape Town.

== The Club today ==
The Owl Club maintains a tradition of monthly dinner meetings for members and their guests, with formal being the acceptable dress code. Each meeting comprises a talk by a guest speaker, a musical interlude, a shorter talk by a member which (because of its purposeful inconsequence) is nicknamed ‘The Wastepaper Basket’, followed by a second musical item and the close of the meeting. The proceedings of each meeting are written up in a monthly ‘Notice’ which is circulated to members.

== Membership ==
Members are classified into one (or more) of five "faculties" which best describe their main interest, i.e: Art, Drama, Literature, Music and/or Science. The category might mirror a member's profession, though there are many members who have an interest in one or more of the membership categories without engaging in it professionally. Membership of the Club is by invitation.

== Meeting hours and reciprocity ==
The Club meets on the third Tuesday of each month (with the exception of January). Unless otherwise notified, meetings commence with a dinner (6.30 p.m. for 7.00 p.m.) and end at about 10.30 p.m. The Owl Club enjoys reciprocity with the Savage Club and the Eccentric Club, both of London, and the Melbourne Savage Club in Australia.

== Further information ==
The origins and history of The Owl Club from 1894 to 1950 are recorded by W.E. Ranby in ‘The Owl Club 1894-1950’ (Cape Town: The Owl Club, 1952). Eric Rosenthal and other Owls continued the account for the years 1951 to 1981 in a collective history, ‘The Third Tuesday’ (Cape Town: The Owl Club, 1982). For its centenary publication, the Club decided to compile an anthology based on the addresses to Owl Club members during the period since 1981: ‘The Unjealous Years: An Owl Club Anthology, Selected And Edited By James A. Henry, with Illustrations By Tony Grogan, Joe Lister & Townley Johnson’ (Cape Town: The Owl Club, 1996) and, most recently, Tony Murray has contributed to the history of the Club with ‘The Glow of Brotherhood; The Owl Club 1994-2019’, illustrated by Tony Grogan (Cape Town, The Owl Club, 2019).
