= Geoffrey Cronjé =

South African sociologist and apartheid activist

- Born: 30 December 1907; Pretoria, South Africa
- Died: 23 January 1992 (aged 84)
- Known for: Founder of Apartheid

Geoffrey Cronjé (30 December 1907 – 23 January 1992) was a South African professor of sociology at the University of Pretoria and one of the founders of the apartheid system in South Africa.

Cronjé believed since Afrikaners lived as a minority in South Africa, blacks and whites could not peacefully co-exist. He considered this to be unjust and un-Christian and proposed an ideology called apartheid. Under apartheid, people of different races were strictly segregated.
