= South African Class Experimental 1 4-6-2 =

1907 design of steam locomotive

CGR Compound Karoo 4-6-2 South African Class Experimental 1 4-6-2
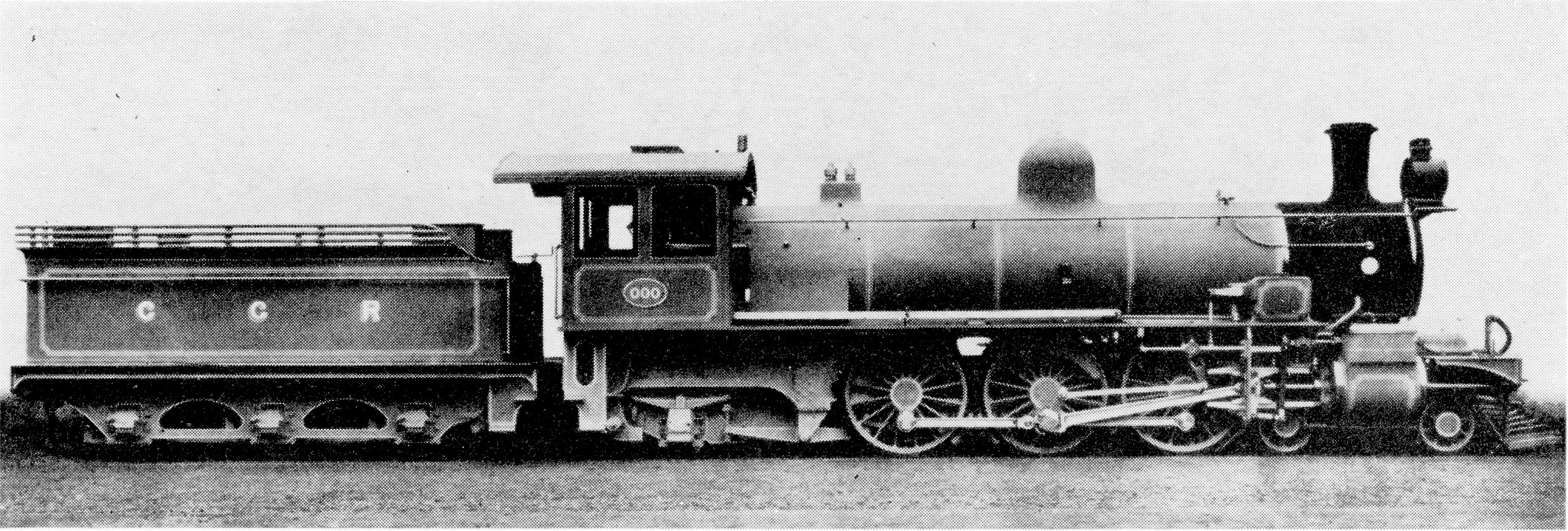
- CGR 3 Cylinder Compound Karoo no. 900; SAR Class Experimental 1 no. 764, c. 1907
Type and origin
- Power type: Steam
- Designer: Cape Government Railways (H.M. Beatty)
- Builder: North British Locomotive Company
- Serial number: 17600
- Model: CGR Compound Karoo
- Build date: 1907
- Total produced: 1
Specifications
- Configuration
  - Whyte: 4-6-2 (Pacific)
  - UIC: 2'C1'nv3
- Driver: 2nd coupled axle
- Gauge: 3 ft 6 in (1,067 mm) Cape gauge
- Leading dia.: 28 1/2 in (724 mm)
- Coupled dia.: 60 in (1,524 mm)
- Trailing dia.: 33 in (838 mm)
- Tender wheels: 37 in (940 mm)
- Wheelbase: 49 ft 7 5/8 in (15,129 mm)
  - Axle spacing (Asymmetrical): 1-2: 5 ft 2 in (1,575 mm); 2-3: 5 ft 3 in (1,600 mm)
  - Engine: 28 ft 9 in (8,763 mm)
  - Leading: 6 ft (1,829 mm)
  - Coupled: 10 ft 5 in (3,175 mm)
  - Tender: 11 ft (3,353 mm)
- Length
  - Over couplers: 58 ft 3 3/4 in (17,774 mm)
- Height: 12 ft 10 in (3,912 mm)
- Frame type: Bar
- Axle load: 14 LT 5 cwt (14,480 kg)
  - Leading: 12 LT 16 cwt (13,010 kg)
  - 1st coupled: 13 LT 12 cwt (13,820 kg)
  - 2nd coupled: 14 LT 5 cwt (14,480 kg)
  - 3rd coupled: 14 LT (14,220 kg)
  - Trailing: 10 LT 19 cwt (11,130 kg)
  - Tender axle: Axle 1: 11 LT 8 cwt (11,580 kg); Axle 2: 10 LT 11 cwt (10,720 kg); Axle 3: 11 LT 10 cwt (11,680 kg)
- Adhesive weight: 41 LT 17 cwt (42,520 kg)
- Loco weight: 65 LT 12 cwt (66,650 kg)
- Tender weight: 33 LT 9 cwt (33,990 kg)
- Total weight: 99 LT 1 cwt (100,600 kg)
- Tender type: 3-axle
- Fuel type: Coal
- Fuel capacity: 5 LT (5.1 t)
- Water cap.: 2,920 imp gal (13,300 L)
- Firebox
  - Type: Round-top
  - Grate area: 26.5 sq ft (2.46 m^{2})
- Boiler
  - Pitch: 7 ft 3 in (2,210 mm)
  - Diameter: 4 ft 9 in (1,448 mm)
  - Tube plates: 15 ft 6 in (4,724 mm)
  - Small tubes: 181: 2 in (51 mm)
- Boiler pressure: 200 psi (1,379 kPa)
- Safety valve: Ramsbottom
- Heating surface
  - Firebox: 114 sq ft (10.6 m^{2})
  - Tubes: 1,469 sq ft (136.5 m^{2})
  - Total surface: 1,583 sq ft (147.1 m^{2})
- Cylinders: Three
- High-pressure cylinder: 19 in (483 mm) bore 26 in (660 mm) stroke
- Low-pressure cylinder: 21 1/2 in (546 mm) bore 26 in (660 mm) stroke
- Valve gear: Walschaerts
- Valve type: Balanced slide
- Couplers: Johnston link-and-pin AAR knuckle (1930s)
Performance figures
- Tractive effort: 23,470 lbf (104.4 kN) @ 75%
Career
- Operators: Cape Government Railways; South African Railways
- Class: CGR Compound Karoo; SAR Class Experimental 1
- Number in class: 1
- Numbers: CGR 900, SAR 764
- Delivered: 1907
- First run: 1907
- Withdrawn: 1933

The South African Railways Class Experimental 1 4-6-2 of 1907 was a steam locomotive from the pre-Union era in the Cape of Good Hope.

In 1907, the Cape Government Railways placed a single experimental three-cylinder compound steam locomotive with a 4-6-2 Pacific type wheel arrangement in service between Beaufort West and De Aar. It was based on the second series of its Karoo Class locomotives. In 1912, when the locomotive was assimilated into the South African Railways, it was renumbered and designated Class Experimental 1.

== Manufacturer ==
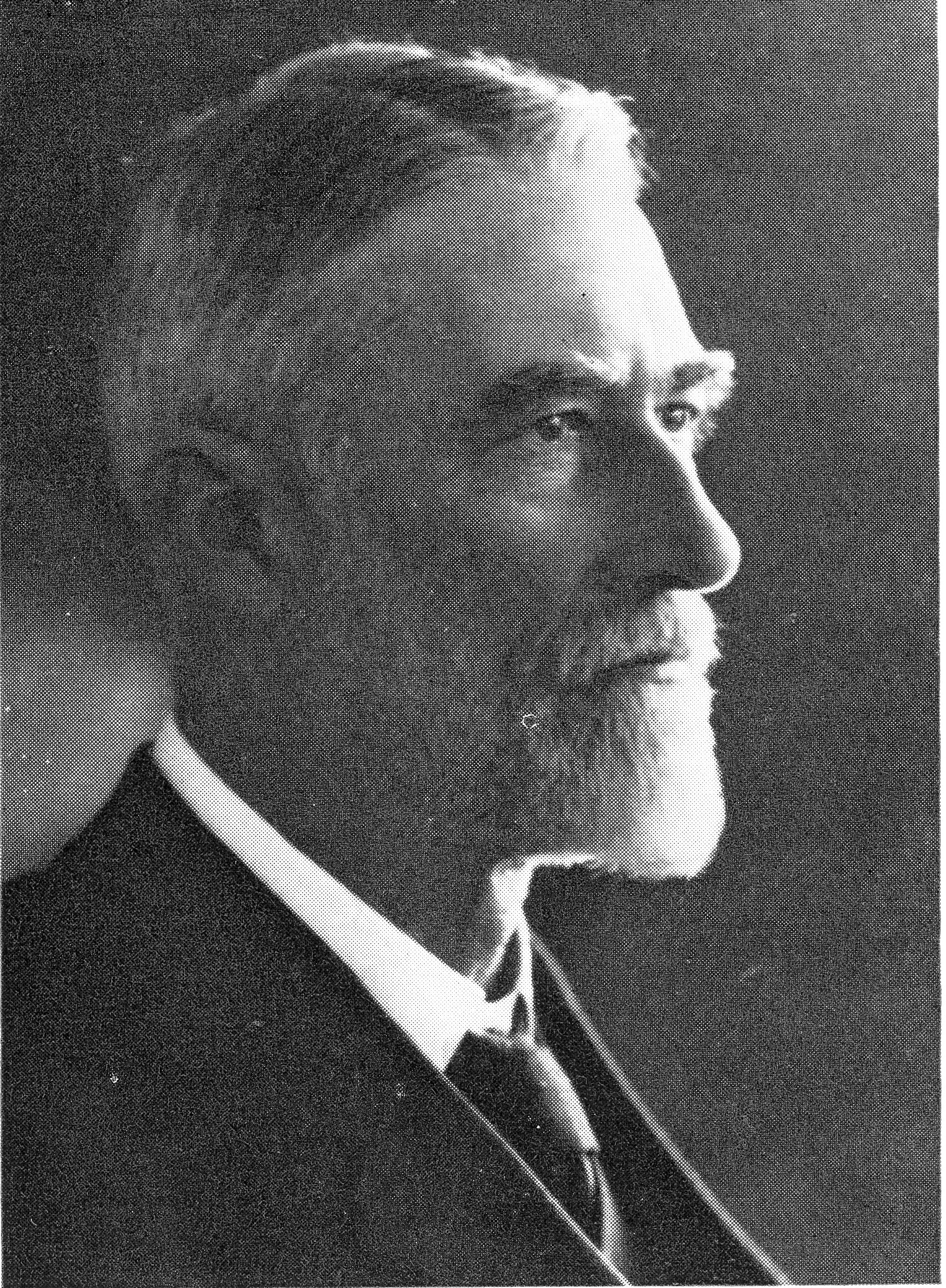
H.M. Beatty

In the first few years of the twentieth century, H.M. Beatty, Chief Locomotive Superintendent of the Cape Government Railways (CGR), experimented with various forms of compound steam locomotives. One of these engines was delivered by the North British Locomotive Company (NBL) in 1907. It was a three-cylinder compound locomotive, based on the second version of the CGR's Karoo Class. The locomotive was numbered 900, but it was not classified by the CGR and was simply referred to as the Compound Karoo.

== Compound expansion ==
=== Compound locomotive ===
In a compound locomotive, steam is expanded in phases. After being expanded in a high-pressure cylinder and having then lost pressure and given up part of its heat, it is exhausted into a larger-volume low-pressure cylinder for secondary expansion, after which it is exhausted through the smokebox. By comparison, in the more usual arrangement of simple expansion (simplex), steam is expanded just once in any one cylinder before being exhausted through the smokebox.

=== Three-cylinder compound ===
On the Compound Karoo, the cylinders were arranged in the "Smith" system of compounding, with a single high-pressure cylinder situated between the two low-pressure cylinders. The Smith system of compounding was developed from the two-cylinder Worsdell-von Borries compound system. Walter Mackersie Smith, a Scottish engineer, improved on this system by developing a three-cylinder compound system with one high-pressure cylinder inside and two low-pressure cylinders outside. It permitted the locomotive to be worked in either compound, semi-compound or simplex mode.

Compound mode

When working compound, the whole of the exhaust steam from the high-pressure cylinder passed into the low-pressure cylinders.

Semi-compound mode

Upon starting, semi-compound working allowed boiler steam to be admitted directly to the low-pressure cylinders through a reducing valve. This obtained greater tractive effort and avoided starting trouble due to the high-pressure crank being at or near dead centre.

Simplex mode

Non-return valves were fitted which, under certain conditions, caused both ends of the high-pressure cylinder to be in communication, with the result that the piston would be floating and the low-pressure cylinders would be receiving high-pressure steam, thus converting the engine to simplex working.

== Characteristics ==
The locomotive had a bar frame, Walschaerts valve gear and used saturated steam.

The inside high-pressure cylinder had a slide valve below, while the two outside low-pressure cylinders had balanced slide valves above. The cylinder ratio was 1 to 2.45. The outside cranks were placed 90 degrees apart, while the middle inside crank was placed at 135 degrees from each of the outer two. All three cylinders actuated the middle coupled axle and their valves were actuated from this axle by an eccentric for the inside cylinder and two return cranks for the outer cylinders. The exhaust from the high-pressure cylinder passed directly into a large steam chest common to both low-pressure cylinders, which eliminated the need for a receiver pipe.

== Performance ==
During 1907, extensive comparative tests were carried out with the Compound Karoo and a simplex two-cylinder locomotive, Karoo Class no. 907. Initial results showed that, while the compound locomotive displayed no marked economy of fuel over the simplex, it ran with remarkable steadiness and could take a heavy train up a long continuous grade at a much higher speed than the simplex. With the direct admission of boiler steam into the low-pressure cylinders in semi-compound mode, the engine started without difficulty, without fail.

After having been in service for two years, however, experienced drivers of the Compound Karoo reported that, if treated and handled properly, the compound locomotive could outperform the simplex in terms of power as well as fuel and water consumption. In 1909, Beatty could report that the engine showed a coal economy of 8% in comparison with the simplex, doing the same work. One driver described how the judicious use of semi-compound mode on heavy grades, injecting high-pressure steam in the low-pressure cylinders, enhanced the locomotive's performance, and how the life of the high-pressure big-end bearings, which initially proved troublesome, could be prolonged by mixing castor oil in with the regular oil which was used on all the bearings and the valve motion.

The long gradients in the Karoo did not allow the locomotive to be worked in simplex mode for extended periods, however, since the boiler's steaming capacity was insufficient. The difficulties regarding accessibility to the inside cylinder, inherent with the cramped space allowed for a third cylinder by the 3 feet 6 inches (1,067 millimetres) Cape gauge, probably also served as a deterrent and only the one locomotive was therefore built.

== Service ==
=== Cape Government Railways ===
The Compound Karoo was placed in service in the Karoo, on the section between Beaufort West and De Aar. It performed well, provided the centre high-pressure big-end bearings were given adequate care and frequent lubrication.

=== South African Railways ===
When the Union of South Africa was established on 31 May 1910, the three Colonial government railways (CGR, Natal Government Railways and Central South African Railways) were united under a single administration to control and administer the railways, ports and harbours of the Union. Although the South African Railways and Harbours came into existence in 1910, the actual classification and renumbering of all the rolling stock of the three constituent railways were only implemented with effect from 1 January 1912.

In 1912, the Compound Karoo was designated Class Experimental 1 on the South African Railways and renumbered 764. It continued to work passenger trains through the Karoo until it was withdrawn from service in 1933 and scrapped.
