= Waterval Onder =

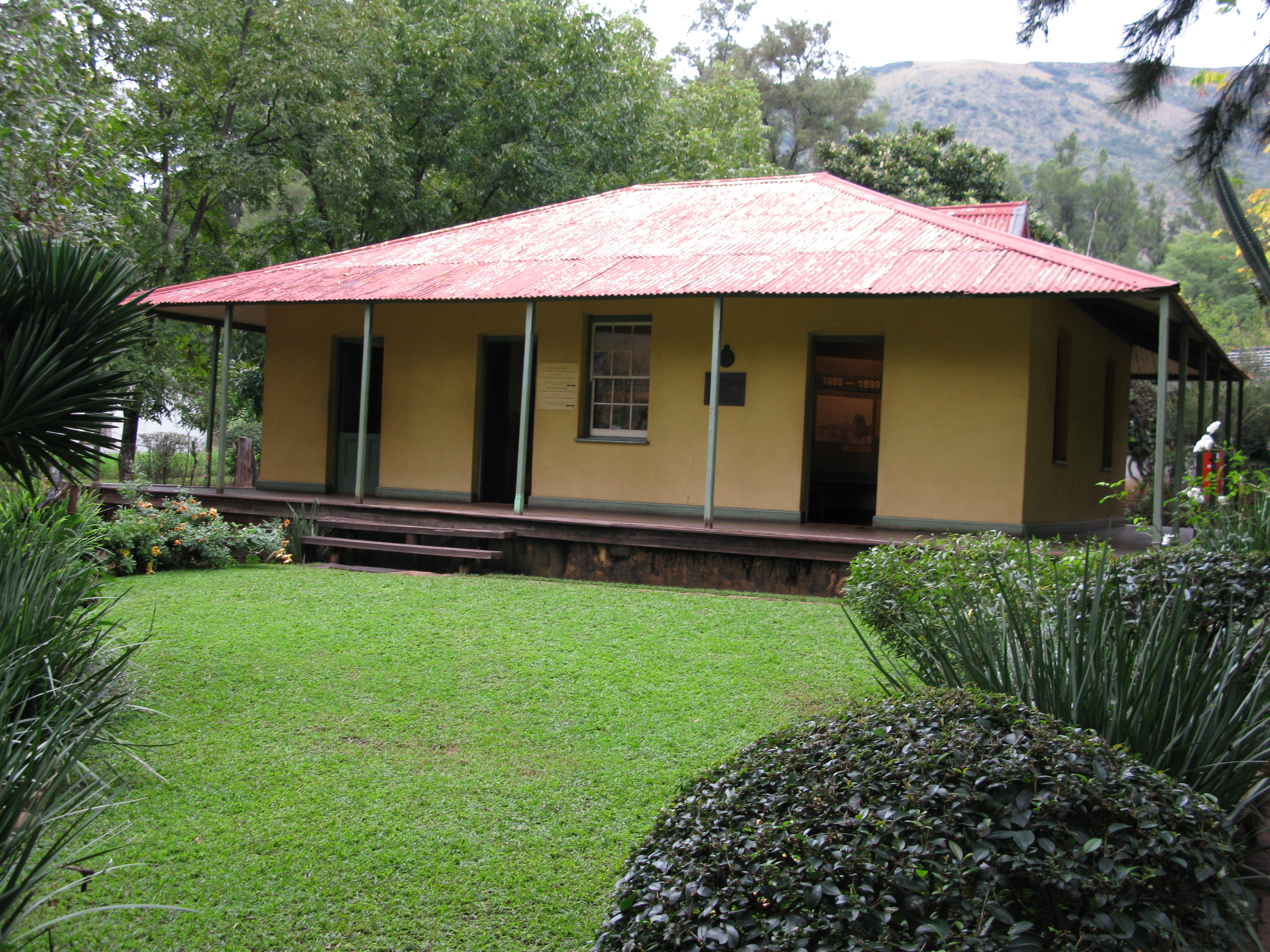
- Krugerhof house, now a museum

- Location within Mpumalanga Location within South Africa
- Coordinates: 25.647°S 30.382°E
- Country: South Africa
- Province: Mpumalanga
- District: Nkangala
- Municipality: Emakhazeni
- Time zone: UTC+2 (SAST)

Waterval Onder is a small village situated at the base of the escarpment on the banks of the Elands River in Emakhazeni Local Municipality, Mpumalanga, South Africa.

== History ==
The name means below the waterfall, due to its position below a 75 m waterfall (Elands River Falls). The village did not develop into a town like its sister town of Waterval Boven, which is above the waterfall. Both settlements were established in 1895 because of the building of the Pretoria - Delagoa Bay railway line built by the Netherlands-South African Railway Company (NZASM).

President Paul Kruger lived in Waterval Onder before he left South Africa via Mozambique during the Anglo-Boer war. His Krugerhof house was proclaimed a national monument.
