= Waterval Boven =

- Location within Mpumalanga Location within South Africa
- Coordinates: 25°39′S 30°20′E
- Country: South Africa
- Province: Mpumalanga
- District: Nkangala
- Municipality: Emakhazeni

Area
  - Total: 38.88 km^{2} (15.01 sq mi)

Population (2011)
  - Total: 6,178
  - Density: 158.9/km^{2} (411.5/sq mi)

Racial makeup (2011)
  - Black African: 83.3%
  - Coloured: 1.7%
  - Indian/Asian: 0.8%
  - White: 14.0%
  - Other: 0.2%

First languages (2011)
  - Swazi: 70.9%
  - Afrikaans: 13.8%
  - English: 3.4%
  - Zulu: 3.0%
  - Other: 9.0%
- Time zone: UTC+2 (SAST)
- Postal code (street): 1195
- Area code: 013
- Website: www.watervalboven.com

Waterval Boven (officially known as Emgwenya) is a small town situated on the edge of the Escarpment on the banks of the Elands River above the 75m Elands Falls on the railway line from Pretoria to Maputo in Mpumalanga, South Africa. Hence the name, which is Dutch for "above the waterfall".

It is the sister town of Waterval Onder which is at the base of the Escarpment below the waterfall. Both settlements were established in 1895 because of the building of the Pretoria - Delagoa Bay railway line, built by the Netherlands-South African Railway Company (NZASM).
