= Verulam, Mpumalanga =

Verulam
- Location within Mpumalanga Location within South Africa
- Coordinates: 25°44′31″S 31°3′29″E
- Country: South Africa
- Province: Mpumalanga
- District: Ehlanzeni
- Municipality: Mbombela

Area
  - Total: 1.40 km^{2} (0.54 sq mi)

Population (2011)
  - Total: 3,420
  - Density: 2,440/km^{2} (6,330/sq mi)

Racial makeup (2011)
  - Black African: 99.2%
  - Coloured: 0.1%
  - White: 0.7%

First languages (2011)
  - Swazi: 93.4%
  - Tsonga: 2.2%
  - Other: 4.4%
- Time zone: UTC+2 (SAST)
- Postal code (street): 1300
- PO box: 1300
- Area code: 013

Verulam is a township just north of Barberton in the Mpumalanga province of South Africa. It is situated in the De Kaap Valley and is fringed by the Makhonjwa Mountains. It is 43 kilometres (27 mi) south of Nelspruit and 360 kilometres (220 mi) to the east of Johannesburg.
