= Valencia Park, Mbombela =

Suburb of Mbombela, South Africa

Valencia Park Valencia
- Suburb
- Location within Mpumalanga Location within South Africa Location within Africa
- Coordinates: 25°28′3″S 30°59′48″E
- Country: South Africa
- Province: Mpumalanga
- District: Ehlanzeni
- Municipality: Mbombela
- Main Place: Mbombela

Area
  - Total: 0.51 km^{2} (0.20 sq mi)

Population (2011)
  - Total: 853
  - Density: 1,700/km^{2} (4,300/sq mi)

Racial makeup (2011)
  - Indian/Asian: 66%
  - Black African: 31.1%
  - Coloured: 21.1%
  - White: 0.2%
  - Other: 0.6%

First languages (2011)
  - English: 56.6%
  - Swazi: 21.1%
  - Zulu: 2.7%
  - Other: 19.8%
- Time zone: UTC+2 (SAST)
- Postal code (street): 1201
- PO box: 1200
- Area code: 013

Valencia Park is a suburb of Mbombela in Mpumalanga, South Africa. It is situated on the eastern outskirts of Mbombela and approximately 2 kilometres (1.2 mi) east of the CBD.

== History ==
Valencia Park was established in the early 1970s for the Indian population of Mbombela (then Nelspruit) as part of the Group Areas Act. It borders the suburb of Nelindia to the east, which was also established as an Indian suburb of Nelspruit during the Apartheid era.

== Main roads ==
Valencia Park is situated north of the R104 (Samora Machel Drive) connecting the Mbombela CBD and eMalahleni (via the N4) to the west with Maputo (via the N4) to the east. It is also situated south of the KaNyamazane Road connecting the R40 in Vintonia to the west with KaMagugu and KaNyamazane to the north-east.
