= Zwelisha, Mpumalanga =

Zwelisha
- Location within Mpumalanga Location within South Africa
- Coordinates: 25.377°S 31.168°E
- Country: South Africa
- Province: Mpumalanga
- District: Ehlanzeni
- Municipality: Mbombela

Area
  - Total: 4.58 km^{2} (1.77 sq mi)

Population (2011)
  - Total: 12,636
  - Density: 2,760/km^{2} (7,150/sq mi)

Racial makeup (2011)
  - Black African: 99.7%
  - Coloured: 0.2%
  - Other: 0.1%

First languages (2011)
  - Swazi: 91.8%
  - Tsonga: 5.2%
  - Other: 3.0%
- Time zone: UTC+2 (SAST)
- Postal code (street): n/a
- PO box: n/a
- Area code: 013

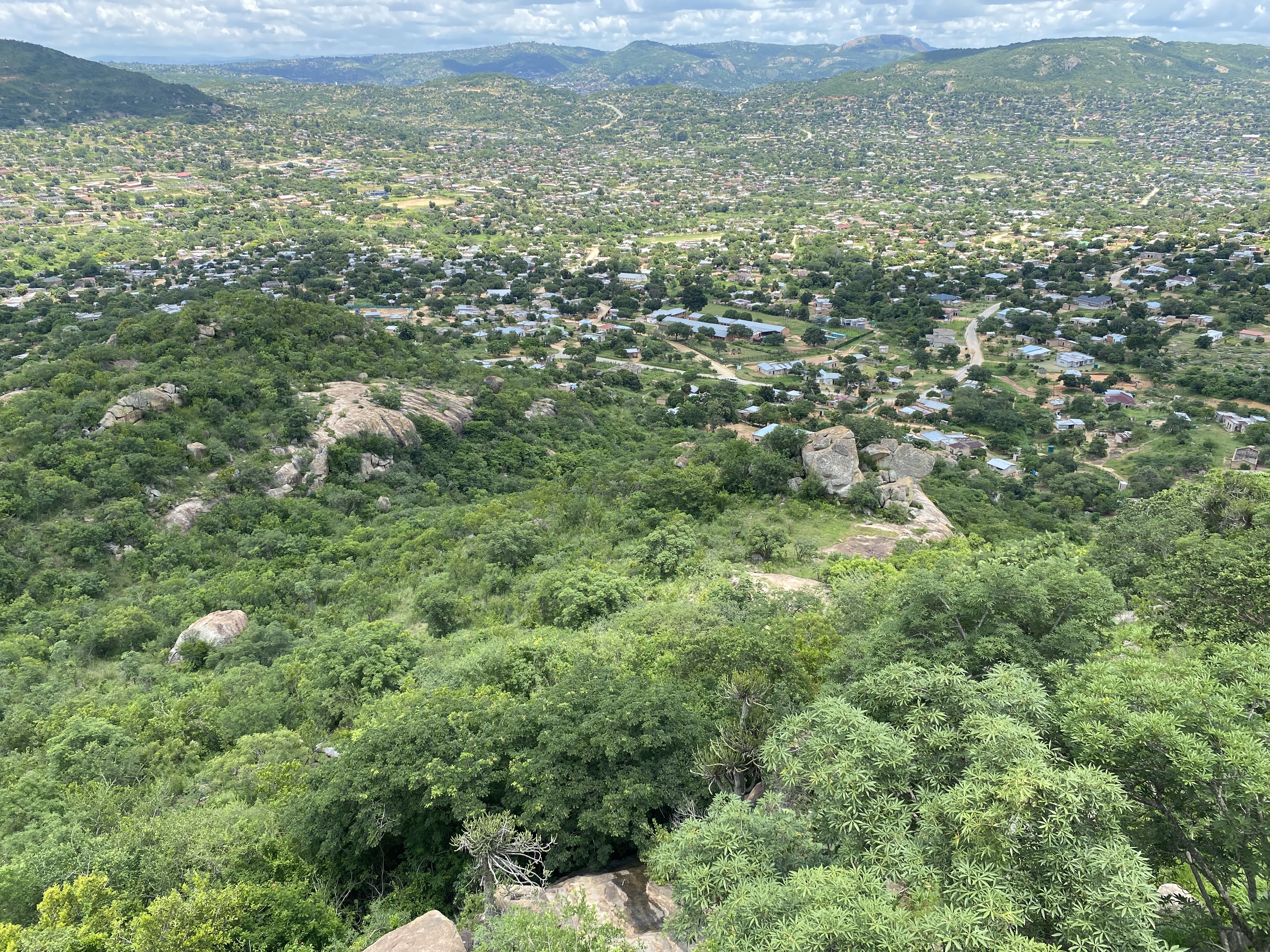
View of Zwelisha, Mpumalanga

Zwelisha is a rural settlement in Mbombela Local Municipality in Ehlanzeni District of the Mpumalanga province, South Africa.

It is located among granite boulders and among Pretorioskop Sour Bushveld, Malalane Mountain Bushveld and Crocodile Gorge Mountain Bushveld vegetation types.

The area is serviced by Zwelisha clinic, which provides Primary Health Care and Zwelisha Primary School which serves over 1100 children.

== History ==
The presence of rock paintings in the Zwelisha area indicates that hunter gathers have lived in the area for thousands of years.

Historically, Zwelisha was in the Nsikazi district, which became part of the KaNagwane bantustan in the 1960s.

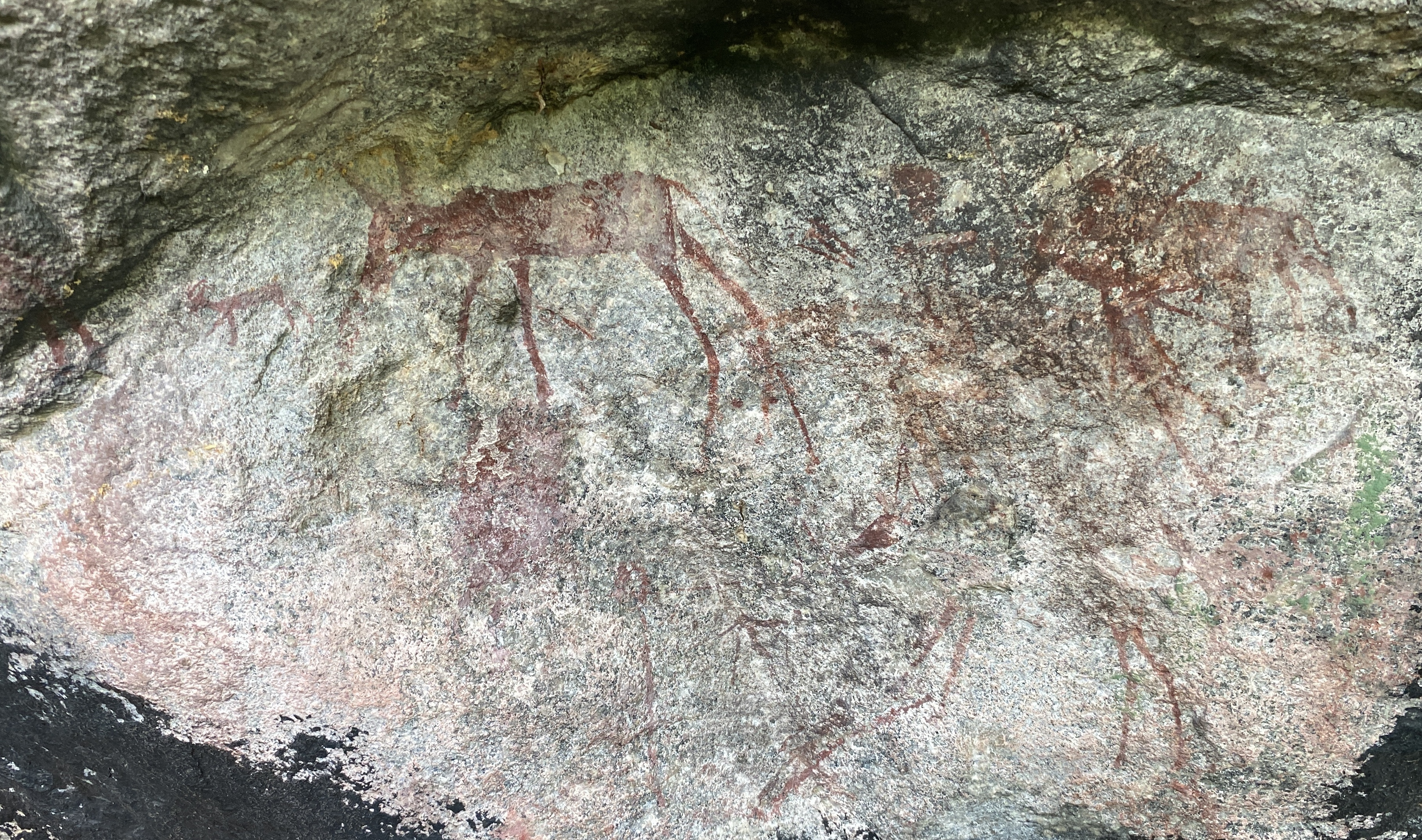
Rock paintings in Zwelisha, Mpumalanga

== Demography ==
During the national census of 2011 the 4.58 km^{2} village housed an estimated 12,636 inhabitants, of which 99,7% were Black South Africans with 92% speaking Seswati as their home language.

== Gallery ==
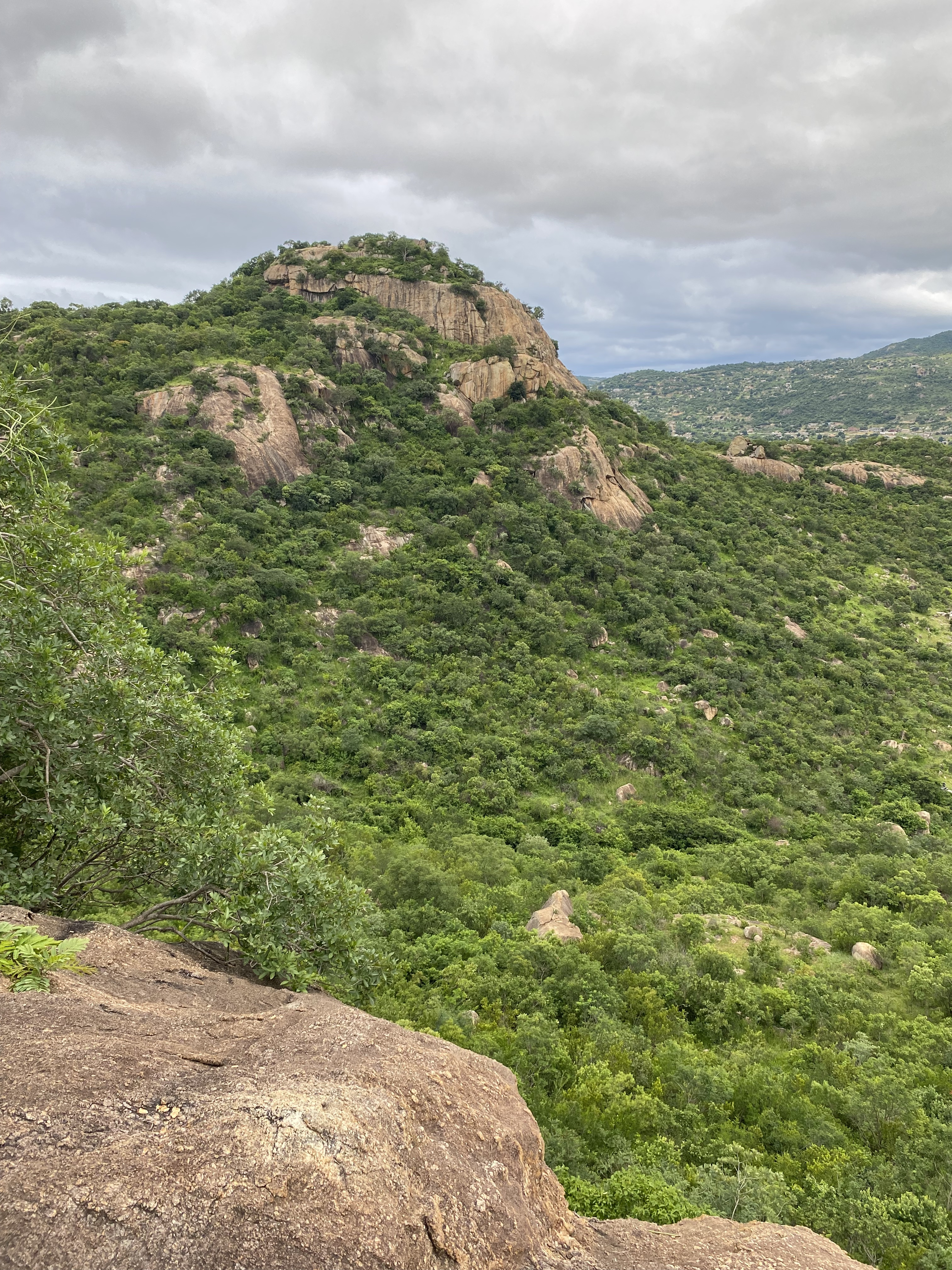
Landscape surrounding Zwelisha

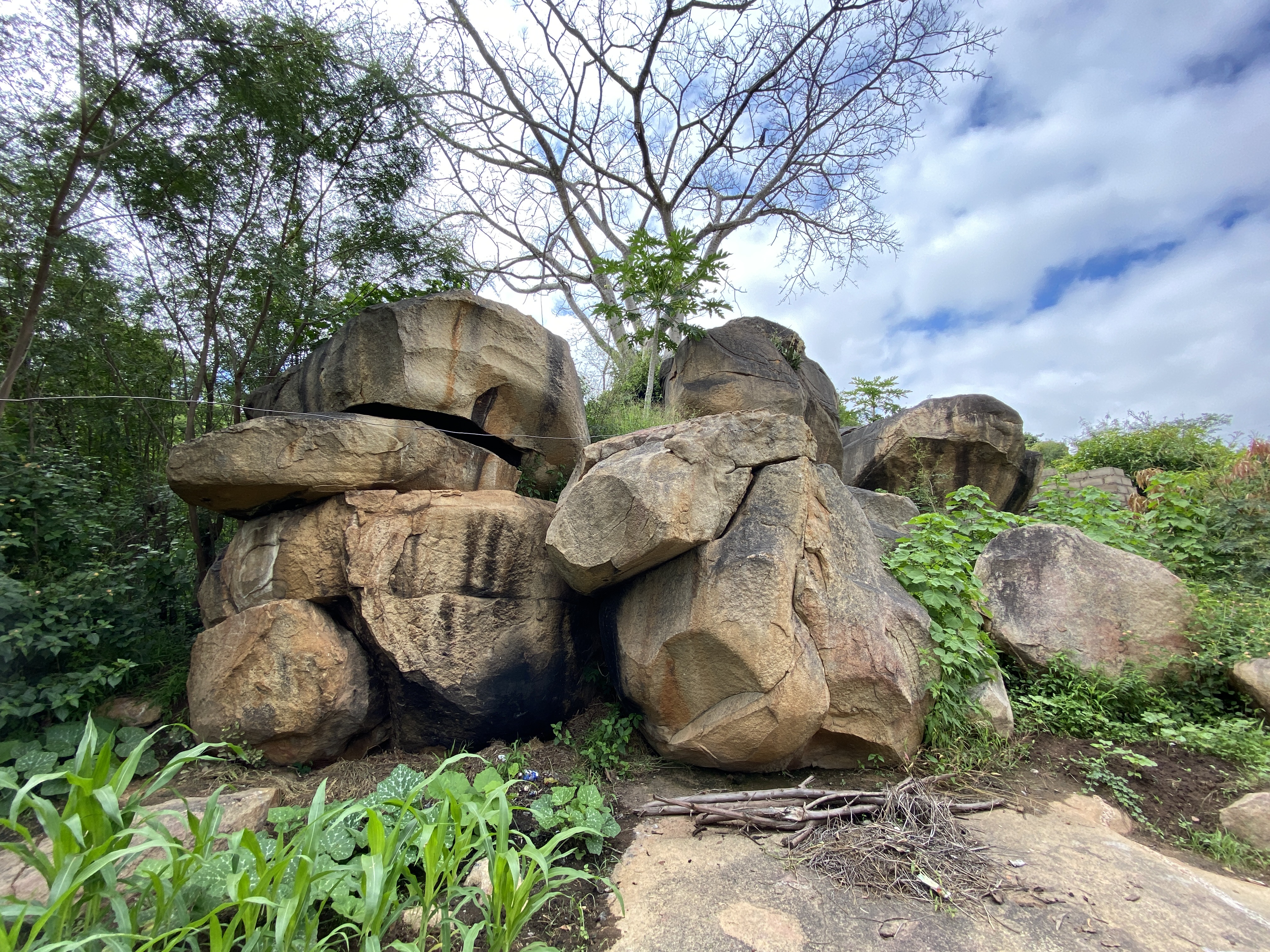
Granite rocks in Zwelisha

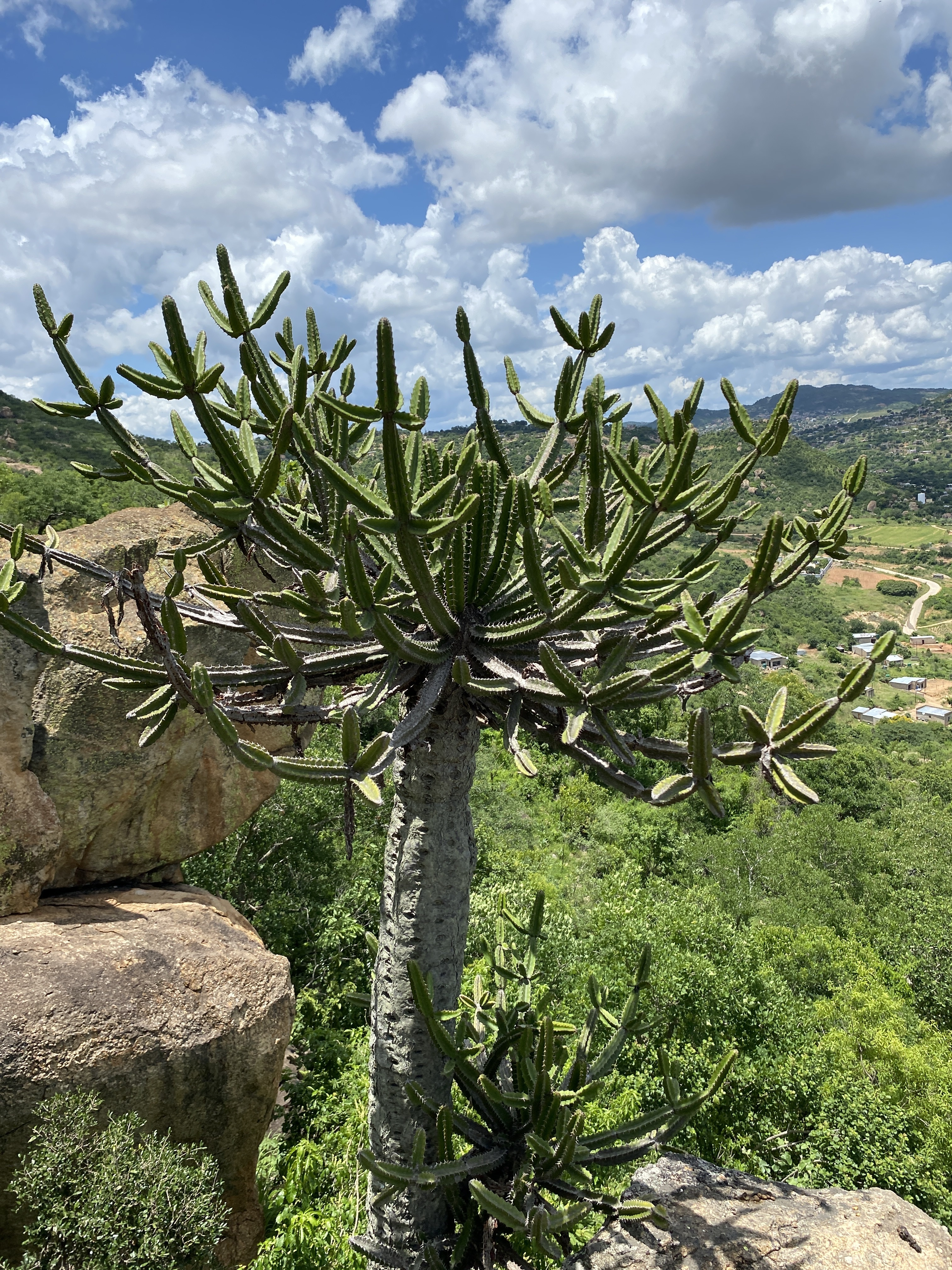
