= Mlondi =

Mlondi is a South African given name. Notable people with the surname include:

- Mlondi Mbanjwa (born 1998), South African soccer player
- Mlondi Mveli Mdluli (born 1998), South African economist, academic, and politician
- Mlondi Mdluli (1984–2006), Swazi footballer
- Mlondi Dlamini (1997–2017), South African professional footballer
