= Okkerneutboom =

Okkerneutboom Xikhusese
- Location within Mpumalanga Location within South Africa
- Coordinates: 24.595°S 31.139°E
- Country: South Africa
- Province: Mpumalanga
- District: Ehlanzeni
- Municipality: Bushbuckridge

Area
  - Total: 19.55 km^{2} (7.55 sq mi)

Population (2011)
  - Total: 13,324
  - Density: 681.5/km^{2} (1,765/sq mi)

Racial makeup (2011)
  - Black African: 99.8%
  - Indian/Asian: 0.1%
  - Other: 0.1%

First languages (2011)
  - Tsonga: 89.3%
  - Northern Sotho: 4.5%
  - Sotho: 3.3%
  - Other: 2.9%
- Time zone: UTC+2 (SAST)

Okkerneutboom is a town in Bushbuckridge Local Municipality in the Mpumalanga province of South Africa.
