= Swalala =

- Location within Mpumalanga Location within South Africa
- Coordinates: 25.183°S 31.117°E
- Country: South Africa
- Province: Mpumalanga
- District: Ehlanzeni
- Municipality: Mbombela

Government
  - Type: Ward 07

Area
  - Total: 4.19 km^{2} (1.62 sq mi)

Population (2011)
  - Total: 7,954
  - Density: 1,900/km^{2} (4,920/sq mi)

Racial makeup (2011)
  - Black African: 99.0%
  - Coloured: 0.4%
  - Indian/Asian: 0.1%
  - White: 0.1%
  - Other: 0.4%

First languages (2011)
  - Swazi: 92.3%
  - Sotho: 2.1%
  - Other: 5.6%
- Time zone: UTC+2 (SAST)
- PO box: 1254
- Area code: 013

Swalala is a rural settlement in Mbombela Local Municipality in Ehlanzeni District of the Mpumalanga province, South Africa.

During the national census of 2011 it was estimated that the 4.19 km^{2} village house almost 8,000 inhabitants, of which 99% were Black South Africans with 92% speaking Seswati as their home language.

Swalala is also a popular poem by Samike Ndisya that depicts Swalala as any remote place, mostly inhabited by a poor population.
