= Steenbok, Mpumalanga =

Steenbok
- Location within Mpumalanga Location within South Africa
- Coordinates: 25.742°S 31.896°E
- Country: South Africa
- Province: Mpumalanga
- District: Ehlanzeni
- Municipality: Nkomazi

Area
  - Total: 9.52 km^{2} (3.68 sq mi)

Population (2001)
  - Total: 10,467
  - Density: 1,100/km^{2} (2,850/sq mi)
- Time zone: UTC+2 (SAST)
- PO box: 1347

Steenbok is a rural settlement in Ehlanzeni District Municipality in the Mpumalanga province of South Africa.
