= Vlakbult =

- Location within Mpumalanga Location within South Africa
- Coordinates: 25.638°S 31.726°E
- Country: South Africa
- Province: Mpumalanga
- District: Ehlanzeni
- Municipality: Nkomazi

Area
  - Total: 7.99 km^{2} (3.08 sq mi)

Population (2011)
  - Total: 7,736
  - Density: 968/km^{2} (2,510/sq mi)

Racial makeup (2011)
  - Black African: 99.5%
  - Coloured: 0.3%
  - Indian/Asian: 0.2%

First languages (2011)
  - Swazi: 92.9%
  - Tsonga: 5.5%
  - Other: 1.6%
- Time zone: UTC+2 (SAST)

Vlakbult is a town in Ehlanzeni District Municipality in the Mpumalanga province of South Africa.
