= Cunningmoor =

- Location within Mpumalanga Location within South Africa
- Coordinates: 24.892°S 31.266°E
- Country: South Africa
- Province: Mpumalanga
- District: Ehlanzeni
- Municipality: Bushbuckridge

Area
  - Total: 3.85 km^{2} (1.49 sq mi)

Population (2011)
  - Total: 2,992
  - Density: 777/km^{2} (2,010/sq mi)

Racial makeup (2011)
  - Black African: 99.8%
  - Indian/Asian: 0.1%

First languages (2011)
  - Tsonga: 96.9%
  - Swazi: 1.4%
  - Other: 1.8%
- Time zone: UTC+2 (SAST)

Cunningmoor is a town in Bushbuckridge Local Municipality in the Mpumalanga province of South Africa.Cunningmoor was named after a white man who lived here before in the early 70s to 90s, the man also built a school now known as Cunningmoore Primary School which occupies many of the children of the area. Cunningmoor also known as Cunningmoore-A is mixed cultural town and one of the safest town in Mpumalanga.
