= Mphenyatsatsi =

- Location within Mpumalanga Location within South Africa
- Coordinates: 24°50′19″S 31°02′30″E
- Country: South Africa
- Province: Mpumalanga
- District: Ehlanzeni
- Municipality: Bushbuckridge

Area
  - Total: 2.41 km^{2} (0.93 sq mi)

Population (2011)
  - Total: 2,159
  - Density: 896/km^{2} (2,320/sq mi)

Racial makeup (2011)
  - Black African: 99.4%
  - Indian/Asian: 0.4%
  - White: 0.1%

First languages (2011)
  - Northern Sotho: 57.6%
  - Sotho: 20.0%
  - Tsonga: 10.7%
  - Zulu: 4.5%
  - Other: 7.1%
- Time zone: UTC+2 (SAST)
- Postal code (street): 1280
- PO box: 1280

Mphenyatsatsi is a village ("main place") in Bushbuckridge, Ehlanzeni District, Mpumalanga, South Africa.
