= Mncedisi Shabangu =

South African actor (1969–2022)

- Born: Mncedisi Baldwin Shabangu c. 1969; KwaMashu, Durban, Natal (now KwaZulu-Natal), South Africa
- Died: 24 July 2022 (aged 53); KaNyamazane, Mpumalanga
- Occupations: Actor; playwright; theatre director
- Years active: 1992–2022
- Awards: Standard Bank Young Artist Award

Mncedisi Baldwin Shabangu (c. 1969 – 24 July 2022) was a South African actor, playwright, and theatre director best known for his role as Khulekani Ngobese in a South African TV musical drama series Rhythm City. He was the winner of several awards including the 2004 Standard Bank Young Artist Award.

Shabangu died at his home in KaNyamazane, Mpumalanga on 24 July 2022.

== Early years ==
Shabangu was born in KwaMashu, Durban, KwaZulu-Natal. However, like most black families in South Africa in the 70s, he and his family were relocated to KaNyamazane near Mbombela, Mpumalanga (previously known as Nelspruit) at the behest of the South African government under the Group Areas Act.

While growing up in the townships, his passion for acting and interest in stage plays were ignited by the late South African playwright and producer, Gibson Kente. In 1995, he enrolled at Market Theatre Laboratory in Johannesburg, where he trained as an actor and theatre maker. In 1998, he studied theatre-making at the Royal National Theatre Studio in London, England.

== Career ==
Over the years, Shabangu has written and acted in numerous award-winning theatre, film and television performances.

== Awards ==
Shabangu received the following awards:

- FNB Vita for best supporting actor-Call us crazy (2000)
- FNB Vita for best director-Vuka Machel (2003)
- Fleur Du Cap for best actor-Tshepang (2003)
- Standard bank young artist award for drama (2004)
- Naledi Award for best supporting actor-The suitcase (2018)

== Filmography ==
=== Actor ===
- Secret Agenda (1992)
- Ways of Dying (1999)
- Call Us Crazy (2000)
- Best Wedding Ever (2004)
- The Head and the Load (2018)

=== Director ===
- Wangesheya Wangesheya
- The Barbershop
- Vuka Mashele

=== TV and film ===
- The Lab
- The other woman
- Home Sweet Home
- Rhythm City

== Explanatory notes ==
There is confusion over Shabangu's date of birth and age. Most sources including SABC News, Sunday Times, The Citizen, sowetan Live and the Daily Sun indicated that he was 53 at the time of his death. However other sources reported that he was 48 years old.
