= Ludlow, Mpumalanga =

Ludlow
- Location within Mpumalanga Location within South Africa
- Coordinates: 24.681°S 31.276°E
- Country: South Africa
- Province: Mpumalanga
- District: Ehlanzeni
- Municipality: Bushbuckridge

Area
  - Total: 7.06 km^{2} (2.73 sq mi)

Population (2011)
  - Total: 5,766
  - Density: 817/km^{2} (2,120/sq mi)

Racial makeup (2011)
  - Black African: 99.8%
  - Indian/Asian: 0.1%

First languages (2011)
  - Tsonga: 84.3%
  - Sotho: 8.4%
  - Northern Sotho: 5.8%
  - Other: 1.5%
- Time zone: UTC+2 (SAST)
- PO box: 1365

Ludlow is a town in Ehlanzeni District Municipality in the Mpumalanga province of South Africa. It is a famous landmark and historical place
