= Rebecca Malope =

South African gospel singer

Rebecca Malope OIS
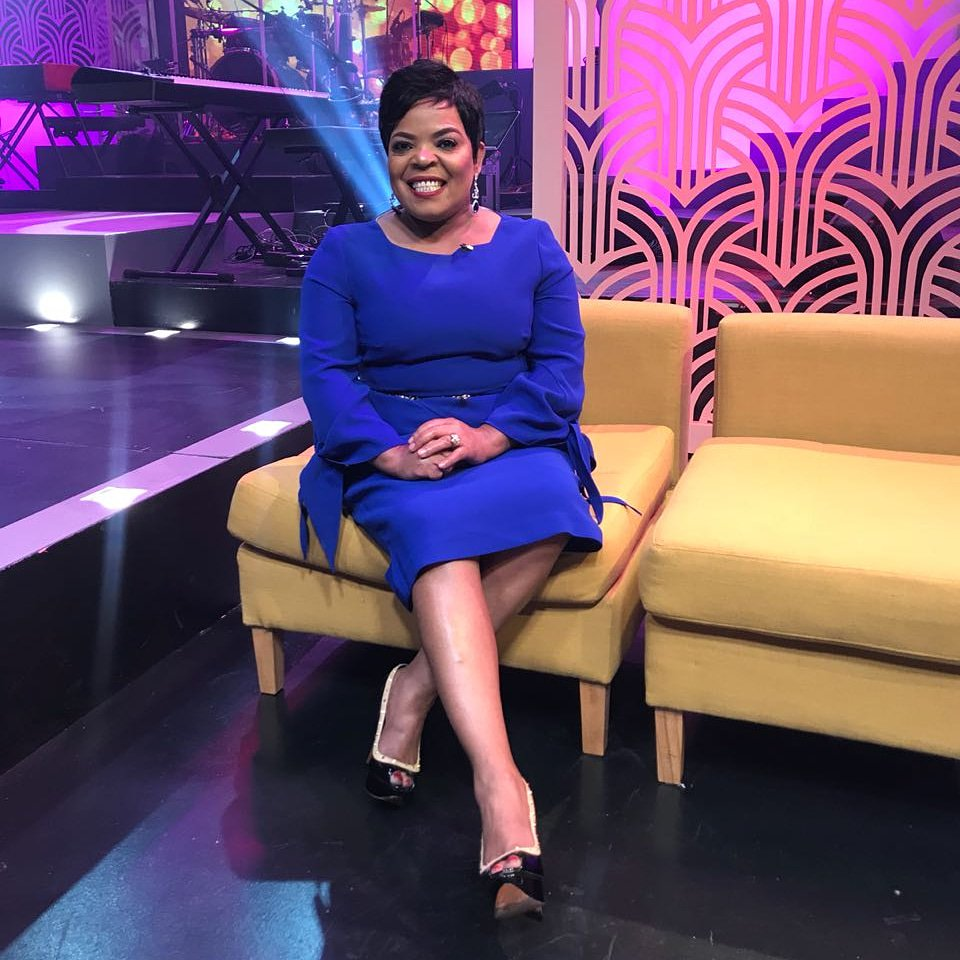

Background information
- Born: Batsogile Lovederia Malope; 30 June 1968 (age 57); Nelspruit, South Africa
- Origin: Lekazi, Mpumalanga, South Africa
- Genres: Gospel
- Occupation: Singer
- Years active: 1984–present

Batsogile Lovederia "Rebecca" Malope (born 30 June 1968) is a South African gospel singer. She is known as "The Queen of Gospel". Her music career spans more than three decades. She has sold at least 10 million albums worldwide, making her one of the best-selling gospel artists of all time. Most of the 36 albums she has released have reached multi-platinum status.

She hosted her own syndicated television show, It's Gospel Time, between 2004 and 2019. In 2013 she was one of the judges in Clash of Choirs South Africa.

In 2021, President Cyril Ramaphosa honoured her with the Order of Ikhamanga (OIS), for her distinguished contribution to South African music.

== Early life ==
Rebecca Malope was born in 1968 in Lekazi near Nelspruit (now Mbombela) in Mpumalanga. In her early age she used a wheelchair after an illness; doctors believed she would be unable to walk on her own. As a child, she and her sisters sang hymns in their local church. Later, as a teen, she joined a gospel group which eventually led her to Johannesburg, where she was brought to the attention of producer Sizwe Zakho.

== Career ==
Her musical career began in 1984. At the age of 16 she and her sister Cynthia left their home township of KaNyamazane, near Nelspruit, and hiked 400 km (250 mi) to Evaton, and then finally reached Johannesburg. In 1985, Malope entered the Shell Road to Fame television contest with the band she was with, but they were eliminated in the first round of the competition.

In 1986, she met Sizwe Zako at Gallo Studios. He remembered her from their unsuccessful auditions. Zako felt that with his guidance Malope could win the Shell Road to Fame where she was to enter the competition as a solo artist. In 1987, Malope did so and won Shell Road to Fame in the category of Female Vocalist with the gospel song "Shine On", dedicated to political unrest during Apartheid in South Africa.

Despite winning Shell Road to Fame, she struggled to find a record company. Finally she was given a recording contract by MFM but was told that gospel music was off-limits. She was pushed to perform disco songs to sell records to compete with Brenda Fassie, Yvonne Chaka Chaka and Mercy Phakela who were the biggest female artists at the time.

Sizwe Zako convinced the executives at MFM to include one gospel song on Malope's debut album Sthembile Kuwe. The song was more well received than the pop songs on the album. In 1989, Malope released two albums, Thank You Very Much and Woza Lovey. Both albums reached platinum status. In 1990, Malope released Buyani. The title track "Buyani" was dedicated to individuals she viewed as struggle heroes, particularly Nelson Mandela who was released from Robben Island prison the same year. The album achieved double platinum status and Malope won Best Female Vocalist at the OKTV Awards, beating Brenda Fassie. In 1991, she released her final pop album Saturday Nite. Like previous albums, she included three gospel songs.

In 1992, Malope released a full gospel album Rebecca Sings Gospel. The album was well received by music critics, media, and fans, and widened her fame. She was the first gospel artist whose songs were played along with mainstream music like pop and Afrikaans music. To this date the album has sold over one million copies and is regarded as one of the best gospel albums of all tie in South Africa.

Following the success of Rebecca Sings Gospel, in 1993 Ngiyekeleni was released, and followed the same success as her previous album. In 1994, she released Umoya Wam whose title track is known as Malope's signature song. The album surpassed her previous records in terms of sales. Malope won the Coca-Cola Full Blast Music Show Best Established Local Artist award with a record of 10 million votes by listeners. She won Best Contemporary Gospel Album at the first South African Music Awards in 1995. The album was dedicated to peace in South Africa as it transitioned to democracy in 1994. In 1996, she released Shwele Baba; it broke records at the time becoming the fastest-selling album in South Africa, selling 100 000 units within three weeks of release.

Malope has released 36 albums in a musical career spanning more than 30 years to date. In 2009, she released her 30th album, entitled My Hero, containing double CDs. In April 2010 she released her 31st album, Uzohamba Nami. On 14 March 2011, Malope released her 32nd album, Ukuthula (which means "Peace"). She was quoted in a local newspaper saying: "In Ukuthula people must expect rejuvenating sounds and I love the whole album. I decided on that name after thinking about the state the world is in today. People have no peace. There is war everywhere, even in churches. I want people to come together and more importantly have peace in their lives, so that we can have peace in the world."

== Personal life ==
Malope is married to businessman Themba Tshabalala.

Malope received an honorary doctorate from the University of KwaZulu-Natal and the University of California for her contribution to the music industry.

== Discography ==
- Rebecca (1987)
- Woza Lovey (1988)
- Thank You Very Much (1989)
- Six of the best (1989)
- Buyani (1990)
- Saturday Nite (1991)
- Rebecca Sings Gospel (1992)
- Ngiyekeleni (1993)
- Umoya Wam (1994)
- Shwele Baba (1995)
- Live at the State Theatre (1996)
- Uzube Nam (1996)
- Angingedwa (1997)
- Free at Last: South African Gospel (1997)
- Somlandela (1998)
- Ukholo lwam (1999)
- Siyabonga (2000)
- Christmas with Rebecca (2000)
- Sabel' Uyabizwa (2001)
- Christmas with Rebecca and Friends (2001)
- Iyahamba Lenqola (2002)
- Hlala Nami (2003)
- The Queen of Gospel and the Village Pope (2004)
- Qaphelani (2005)
- The Greatest Hits (2005)
- Umthombo (2006)
- Live in Soweto (DVD) (2006)
- Live in Soweto (CD) (2007)
- Amakholwa (2007)
- Ujehova Ungu'madida (2008)
- African Classics (2009)
- My Hero (2009)
- Live at the Lyric Theatre (DVD) (2010)
- Uzohamba Nami (2010)
- Ukuthula (2011)
- Rebecca Live Concert ft Tshwane Gospel Choir (CD) (2012)
- Rebecca Live Concert ft Tshwane Gospel Choir (DVD) (2012)
- Bayos' khomba (2013)
- AmaVIP (2014)
- Lord You Are Good (2019)

== Television ==
Malope is a South African gospel singer and television personality who rose to fame after winning the 1987 Shell Road to Fame Competition.

Show	Character
Clash of the Choirs South Africa – Seasons 1–3	Judge – Herself
eKasi: Our Stories – Season 6	Thembi
Gospel Alive – Seasons 1–16	Guest Artist – Herself
Rolling With... – Season 4 (Celeb Edition)	Herself
The South African Music Awards – Season 20	Performer – Herself
Zaziwa – Season 1	Herself
Idols SA Season 14	Guest Judge – Herself
Idols SA Season 15	Guest Judge – Herself
