= Afrirent Holdings =

South African investment company

- Type: Private
- Traded as: Afrirent Fleet (since 2003)
- Industry: Investment
- Founded: 2017; 9 years ago
- Founder: Senzo Tsabedze
- Headquarters: South Africa
- Key people: Senzo Tsabedze, Thenjiwe Tsabedze
- Services: Fleet management, logistics, hospitality
- Number of employees: 751

Afrirent Holdings is a South African investment company that was founded by Senzo Tsabedze.

== Background ==
Afrirent Holdings was founded in 2017 as a holding company for Afrirent Fleet. Afrirent Fleet formerly Indalo Fleet Solutions was founded in 2003 becoming the first black owned fleet management company in South Africa. Afrirent Holdings has several other subsidiaries in logistics, technology, car rental hospitality and other complementary industries.

== Member companies ==
Companies that make up Afrirent Holdings include but are not limited to:

=== Afrirent Mobility ===
- Afrirent Fleet Management
- Afrirent Refurb
- Afrirent Logistics
- Sobantu Rent-to-Own
- Afritracker
- Afrirent Logistics

=== Indalo Hotels and leisure ===
- Skukuza Golf Club
- Ba-phalaborwa Golf and Spa
- Fountains Hotel

=== Afrirent Energy ===
Afrirent Holdings was accused of using political influence in procuring a R 1.2 billion contract with the City of Johannesburg for Afrirent Fleet Pty Ltd in 2018, according to a media report. Following media allegations, the City of Johannesburg started a forensic inquiry to ascertain the veracity of the corruption claims. The City of Johannesburg exonerated the company after the investigation revealed that the allegations of corruption could not be supported.

== Corporate Social Investment ==
Afrirent Holdings actively participates in Corporate Social Investment through several projects in collaboration with other organisations and in 2022 Afrirent Holdings in association with Global Roofing Solutions and the Hicks-Roche, Brown/Moyes and Gibson families funded a "Raise the Roof" roofing initiative with the Uplands Outreach programme.
