= Mdluli =

Mdluli is an African surname that may refer to

- John Mdluli (born 1972), Swaziland football player
- Labotsibeni Mdluli (c.1859–1925), Queen Mother and Queen Regent of Swaziland
- Mlondi Mveli Mdluli (born 1998), South African politician
- Mlungisi Mdluli (born 1980), South African football midfielder
- Philippa Mdluli (1935/1936–1983), Swaziland businesswoman, child killer and cannibal
- Richard Mdluli (born 1958), head of Police Crime Intelligence in South Africa
- Siyabonga Mdluli (born 1986), Swaziland football player
- K.O (rapper) (born Ntokozo Mdluli), South African rapper
- Kaunda Mdluli (born 1990), Swaziland businessman
- Pat Mdluli (born 1989) a South African humanitarian

Ayanda Mdluli (born 1985), a South African journalist and newspaper editor
