= Mkhambathini Local Municipality elections =

Local elections in KwaZulu-Natal, South Africa

The Mkhambathini Local Municipality council consists of nineteen members elected by mixed-member proportional representation. Ten councillors are elected by first-past-the-post voting in ten wards, while the remaining nine are chosen from party lists so that the total number of party representatives is proportional to the number of votes received.

In the election of 4 November 2026, no party won a majority. The African National Congress (ANC) won the largest number of seats on the council, with eight.

== Results ==
The following table shows the composition of the council after past elections.

| Event | ANC | DA | EFF | IFP | MKP | Other | Total |
|---|---|---|---|---|---|---|---|
| 2000 election | 6 | 1 | — | 7 | — | — | 14 |
| 2006 election | 7 | 1 | — | 6 | — | 0 | 14 |
| 2011 election | 9 | 1 | — | 3 | — | 1 | 14 |
| 2016 election | 9 | 1 | 1 | 3 | — | 0 | 14 |
| 2021 election | 9 | 1 | 2 | 2 | — | 0 | 14 |
| 2026 election | 8 | 1 | 0 | 3 | 7 | 0 | 19 |

== December 2000 election ==
The following table shows the results of the 2000 election.

| Party | Ward | | | List | | | Total seats |
| Party | Votes | % | Seats | Votes | % | Seats | Total seats |
|---|---|---|---|---|---|---|---|
| Inkatha Freedom Party | 5,083 | 46.78 | 3 | 5,027 | 46.34 | 4 | 7 |
| African National Congress | 4,921 | 45.29 | 4 | 4,836 | 44.58 | 2 | 6 |
| Democratic Alliance | 862 | 7.93 | 0 | 985 | 9.08 | 1 | 1 |
| Total | 10,866 | 100.00 | 7 | 10,848 | 100.00 | 7 | 14 |
| Valid votes | 10,866 | 97.21 | | 10,848 | 97.05 | | |
| Invalid/blank votes | 312 | 2.79 | | 330 | 2.95 | | |
| Total votes | 11,178 | 100.00 | | 11,178 | 100.00 | | |
| Registered voters/turnout | 23,327 | 47.92 | | 23,327 | 47.92 | | |

== March 2006 election ==
The following table shows the results of the 2006 election.

| Party | Ward | | | List | | | Total seats |
| Party | Votes | % | Seats | Votes | % | Seats | Total seats |
|---|---|---|---|---|---|---|---|
| African National Congress | 6,519 | 53.34 | 5 | 6,478 | 53.18 | 2 | 7 |
| Inkatha Freedom Party | 4,834 | 39.55 | 2 | 4,795 | 39.36 | 4 | 6 |
| Democratic Alliance | 585 | 4.79 | 0 | 627 | 5.15 | 1 | 1 |
| African Christian Democratic Party | 155 | 1.27 | 0 | 155 | 1.27 | 0 | 0 |
| National Democratic Convention | 129 | 1.06 | 0 | 126 | 1.03 | 0 | 0 |
| Total | 12,222 | 100.00 | 7 | 12,181 | 100.00 | 7 | 14 |
| Valid votes | 12,222 | 97.70 | | 12,181 | 97.46 | | |
| Invalid/blank votes | 288 | 2.30 | | 317 | 2.54 | | |
| Total votes | 12,510 | 100.00 | | 12,498 | 100.00 | | |
| Registered voters/turnout | 25,049 | 49.94 | | 25,049 | 49.89 | | |

== May 2011 election ==
The following table shows the results of the 2011 election.

| Party | Ward | | | List | | | Total seats |
| Party | Votes | % | Seats | Votes | % | Seats | Total seats |
|---|---|---|---|---|---|---|---|
| African National Congress | 11,420 | 61.32 | 7 | 12,390 | 66.94 | 2 | 9 |
| Inkatha Freedom Party | 3,255 | 17.48 | 0 | 3,325 | 17.96 | 3 | 3 |
| National Freedom Party | 1,391 | 7.47 | 0 | 1,344 | 7.26 | 1 | 1 |
| Democratic Alliance | 1,370 | 7.36 | 0 | 1,326 | 7.16 | 1 | 1 |
| Independent candidates | 1,100 | 5.91 | 0 | | | | 0 |
| African Christian Democratic Party | 87 | 0.47 | 0 | 125 | 0.68 | 0 | 0 |
| Total | 18,623 | 100.00 | 7 | 18,510 | 100.00 | 7 | 14 |
| Valid votes | 18,623 | 97.38 | | 18,510 | 96.93 | | |
| Invalid/blank votes | 502 | 2.62 | | 586 | 3.07 | | |
| Total votes | 19,125 | 100.00 | | 19,096 | 100.00 | | |
| Registered voters/turnout | 28,882 | 66.22 | | 28,882 | 66.12 | | |

== August 2016 election ==
The following table shows the results of the 2016 election.

| Party | Ward | | | List | | | Total seats |
| Party | Votes | % | Seats | Votes | % | Seats | Total seats |
|---|---|---|---|---|---|---|---|
| African National Congress | 12,454 | 66.45 | 7 | 12,649 | 67.35 | 2 | 9 |
| Inkatha Freedom Party | 3,832 | 20.45 | 0 | 3,793 | 20.20 | 3 | 3 |
| Democratic Alliance | 1,565 | 8.35 | 0 | 1,512 | 8.05 | 1 | 1 |
| Economic Freedom Fighters | 593 | 3.16 | 0 | 553 | 2.94 | 1 | 1 |
| African People's Convention | 202 | 1.08 | 0 | 201 | 1.07 | 0 | 0 |
| Peoples Alliance | 43 | 0.23 | 0 | 72 | 0.38 | 0 | 0 |
| Independent candidates | 53 | 0.28 | 0 | | | | 0 |
| Total | 18,742 | 100.00 | 7 | 18,780 | 100.00 | 7 | 14 |
| Valid votes | 18,742 | 98.30 | | 18,780 | 98.42 | | |
| Invalid/blank votes | 324 | 1.70 | | 301 | 1.58 | | |
| Total votes | 19,066 | 100.00 | | 19,081 | 100.00 | | |
| Registered voters/turnout | 29,889 | 63.79 | | 29,889 | 63.84 | | |

== November 2021 election ==
The following table shows the results of the 2021 election.

| Party | Ward | | | List | | | Total seats |
| Party | Votes | % | Seats | Votes | % | Seats | Total seats |
|---|---|---|---|---|---|---|---|
| African National Congress | 7,825 | 63.77 | 7 | 7,794 | 63.61 | 2 | 9 |
| Economic Freedom Fighters | 1,670 | 13.61 | 0 | 1,647 | 13.44 | 2 | 2 |
| Inkatha Freedom Party | 1,405 | 11.45 | 0 | 1,447 | 11.81 | 2 | 2 |
| Democratic Alliance | 996 | 8.12 | 0 | 987 | 8.06 | 1 | 1 |
| African Transformation Movement | 249 | 2.03 | 0 | 264 | 2.15 | 0 | 0 |
| Abantu Batho Congress | 46 | 0.37 | 0 | 44 | 0.36 | 0 | 0 |
| National Freedom Party | 44 | 0.36 | 0 | 34 | 0.28 | 0 | 0 |
| African Christian Democratic Party | 35 | 0.29 | 0 | 35 | 0.29 | 0 | 0 |
| Total | 12,270 | 100.00 | 7 | 12,252 | 100.00 | 7 | 14 |
| Valid votes | 12,270 | 97.75 | | 12,252 | 97.61 | | |
| Invalid/blank votes | 282 | 2.25 | | 300 | 2.39 | | |
| Total votes | 12,552 | 100.00 | | 12,552 | 100.00 | | |
| Registered voters/turnout | 31,233 | 40.19 | | 31,233 | 40.19 | | |

=== By-elections from November 2021 ===
The following by-elections were held to fill vacant ward seats in the period from the election in November 2021.

| Date | Ward | Party of the previous councillor | Party of the newly elected councillor |
|---|---|---|---|
| 6 December 2023 | 7 | African National Congress | African National Congress |

The African National Congress (ANC) councillor for ward 7 was assassinated, leading to a by-election. The seat was retained by the ANC with an increased majority.

== November 2026 election ==
The following table shows the results of the 2026 election.

| Party | Ward | | | List | | | Total seats |
| Party | Votes | % | Seats | Votes | % | Seats | Total seats |
|---|---|---|---|---|---|---|---|
| African National Congress | 10,734 | 39.91 | 5 | 10,655 | 39.60 | 3 | 8 |
| uMkhonto weSizwe Party | 9,753 | 36.26 | 5 | 10,062 | 37.39 | 2 | 7 |
| Inkatha Freedom Party | 3,724 | 13.85 | 0 | 3,740 | 13.90 | 3 | 3 |
| Democratic Alliance | 935 | 3.48 | 0 | 951 | 3.53 | 1 | 1 |
| Economic Freedom Fighters | 599 | 2.23 | 0 | 568 | 2.11 | 0 | 0 |
| South African Communist Party | 404 | 1.50 | 0 | 339 | 1.26 | 0 | 0 |
| Independent Councillors | 346 | 1.29 | 0 | 343 | 1.27 | 0 | 0 |
| Independent candidates | 172 | 0.64 | 0 | | | | 0 |
| People's Freedom Party | 76 | 0.28 | 0 | 57 | 0.21 | 0 | 0 |
| Afrika Mayibuye Movement | 59 | 0.22 | 0 | 63 | 0.23 | 0 | 0 |
| African Christian Democratic Party | 46 | 0.17 | 0 | 50 | 0.19 | 0 | 0 |
| African Transformation Movement | 19 | 0.07 | 0 | 64 | 0.24 | 0 | 0 |
| Bumbana Mzansi | 27 | 0.10 | 0 | 16 | 0.06 | 0 | 0 |
| Total | 26,894 | 100.00 | 10 | 26,908 | 100.00 | 9 | 19 |
| Valid votes | 26,894 | 98.57 | | 26,908 | 98.39 | | |
| Invalid/blank votes | 391 | 1.43 | | 440 | 1.61 | | |
| Total votes | 27,285 | 100.00 | | 27,348 | 100.00 | | |
| Registered voters/turnout | 44,593 | 61.19 | | 44,593 | 61.33 | | |
