= Senzo Tsabedze =

South African businessman

- Born: Mpumalanga, South Africa
- Occupation: Entrepreneurship
- Known for: First black South African fleet management executive
- Spouse: Thenjiwe Tsabedze

Senzo Tsabedze is a South African entrepreneur. He is the chief executive of Afrirent Holdings. Senzo is the first black South African to own a fleet management company in post apartheid South Africa.

== Background ==
Senzo Tsabedze was born in 1977 in Mshayazafe village, Mpumalanga, South Africa where he grew up. He had his early education at Sithuthukile Primary and progressed to Ekulindeni High School.

Senzo started his business career in 1999 when he registered his first company which was called Siyenza Consulting. In 2002, he established Indalo Fleet Solutions which became the first black owned fleet management company in South Africa history and secured his first government contract at Bushbuckridge Local Municipality for fleet management worth around R37 million in 2006. Senzo was awarded District Entrepreneur of the year 2007 by Ehlanzeni District Municipality mayor. Indalo Fleet Solutions later changed to Afrirent Fleet Pty Ltd in 2003.

In 2015, Senzo established a philanthropy organisation called Tsabedze Foundation through which he does most of his family's philanthropic activities. In 2017, Senzo Tsabedze established Afrirent Holdings as a holding entity for investment interests in Fleet Management, Tourism and Leisure sectors.

In 2018 Senzo was accused in a media article of allegedly securing a R1.2 billion contract with the City of Johannesburg for his company Afrirent Fleet Pty Ltd. This was allegedly done through a relative of Economic Freedom Fighters (EFF) leader Julius Malema for Malema's influence. In 2019, the City of Johannesburg launched a forensic investigation to determine credibility of the corruption claims following the media reports. The company was cleared by the City of Johannesburg after the investigation showed that the corruption claims could not be proven.
