= Bushbuckridge Local Municipality =

Bushbuckridge Mapulaneng
- Local municipality
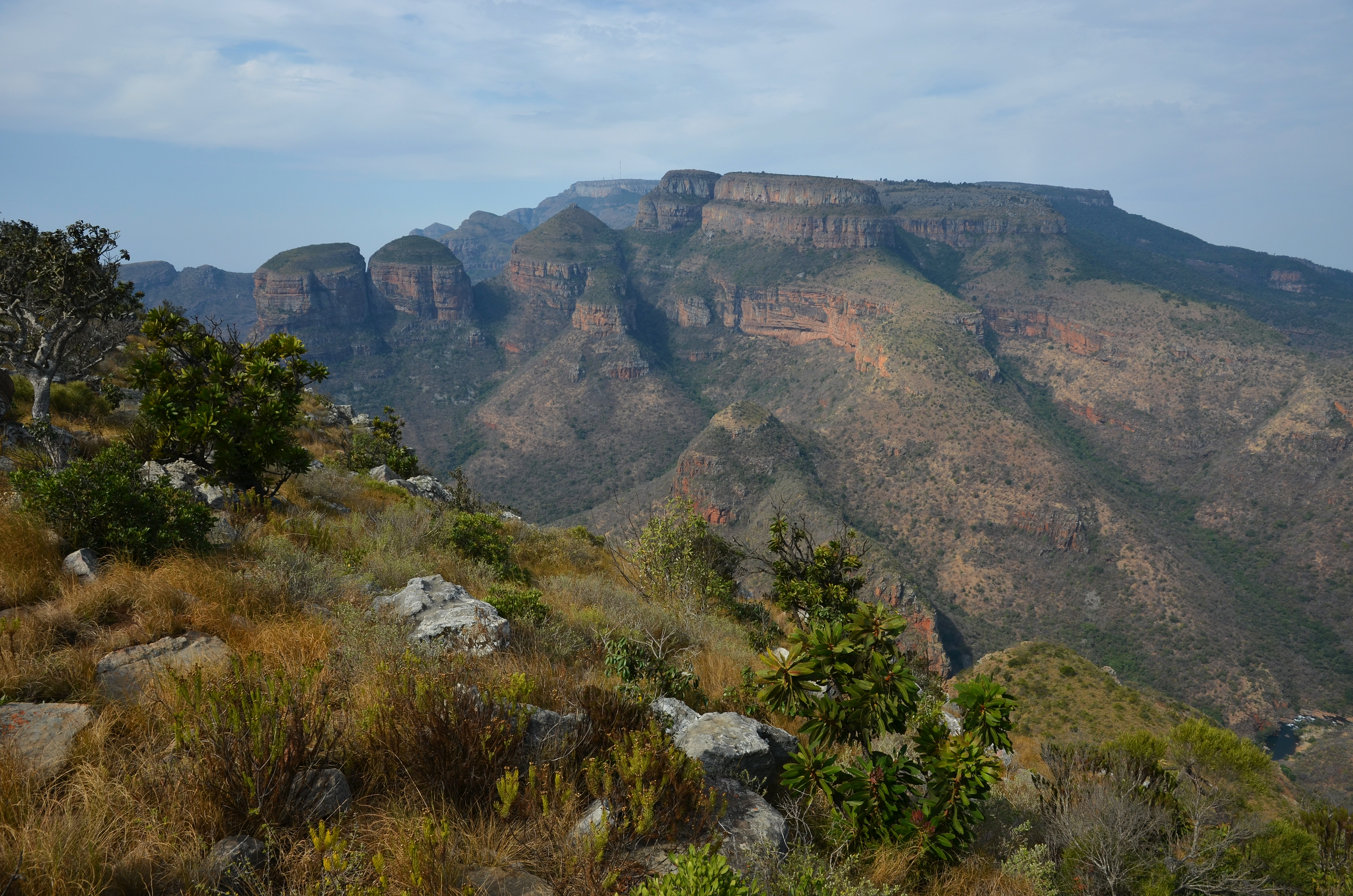
- Blyde River Canyon's Three Rondavels, located partly in Bushbuckridge Municipality

- Seal

- Location in Mpumalanga
- Coordinates: 24°28′S 31°32′E
- Country: South Africa
- Province: Mpumalanga
- District: Ehlanzeni
- Seat: Bushbuckridge
- Wards: 37

Government
  - Type: Municipal council
  - Mayor: vacant (ANC)

Area
  - Total: 10,250 km^{2} (3,960 sq mi)

Population (2011)
  - Total: 541,248
  - Density: 52.80/km^{2} (136.8/sq mi)

Racial makeup (2011)
  - Black African: 99.5%
  - Coloured: 0.1%
  - Indian/Asian: 0.1%
  - White: 0.2%

First languages (2011)
  - Tsonga: 56.88%
  - Northern Sotho: 24.52%
  - Swazi: 7.83%
  - Sotho: 5.42%
  - Other: 5.35%
- Time zone: UTC+2 (SAST)
- Municipal code: MP325

Bushbuckridge Municipality (Tsonga: Masipala wa Bushbuckridge; Northern Sotho: Mmasepala wa Bushbuckridge) is a local municipality within the Ehlanzeni District Municipality, in the Mpumalanga province of South Africa. Commercial farming, which consists of pine and bluegum plantations, tobacco, cotton, sub-tropical fruits and vegetables, is practised in the municipality's countryside. The municipality includes the southern part of Kruger National Park. Bushbuckridge is the largest local municipality in Mpumalanga in terms of land size.

== History ==
The name Bushbuck Ridge was given because of the large herds of bushbuck found there in the 1880s, and the prominent WNW-ESE ridge in the southeastern part of the municipality. The town of Bushbuckridge grew around a trading store that opened in 1884. Prior to the colonial and apartheid era, the land known today as Bushbuckridge and Hazyview was well known as Mapulaneng, it has been home to the Mapulana people for centuries before the Shangaan people and the Swazi people were allowed to settled in the area during the reign of Mapulana chief Maripe Mashile. Mapulaneng was replaced during the white conquest and named Bushbuckridge. Mapulaneng proper stretches from the Eswatini border to Ermelo in the south, Olifants River (Lepelle) in the north, Lebombo Mountains in the east and also includes the whole town of Hazyview, Nelspruit, Sabie, Graskop, Hoedspruit, Barberton, Lydenburg and Dullstroom in the west. In Sepulana, Mapulaneng means "Place of the Mapulana people"; the tribe derive their name from their founding leader, Lepulana who later changed his name to Chiloane. Mapulana are descendants of Morolong and their origin can be traced back to Kgalagadi before they settled in Thaba Chueu, in what is today eastern Lesotho and Shakwaneng (Carolina) in the 1500s. Mapulana of Matshwe I got their name from their leader Pulane and they are of Amazizi of Nguni origin and they join the other Mapulana of Mohlomi at Thaba Chueu after the death of their leader Tsosane. Mapulana successfully defended the area from Swazi armies who they annihilated at the battle of Moholoholo in December 1864.

=== 1995-1996 Protest ===
In 1994, when the Transvaal Province was dismantled and divided into four provinces, the area from Bushbuckridge to Hazyview was included in Limpopo province. The decision was based on the fact that most of the Bushbuckridge area had been part of three separate bantustans — Gazankulu, Lebowa and KaNgwane — but the bigger sector fell within Gazankulu, which was incorporated into Limpopo. The citizens of Bushbuckridge were unhappy with this arrangement, and became embroiled in a dispute with the government, demanding inclusion of the area in Mpumalanga province. They were concerned that should the area be included into Limpopo, they would be marginalised and suffer poor service delivery since Polokwane, the capital city of Limpopo Province, is more than 300 km away, whereas Nelspruit, the capital of Mpumalanga is only 94 km away. For more than two years the government refused to place Bushbuckridge under Mpumalanga, leading to violent protests and resistance from the community, which included stay-aways, road blocks with burning tyres and destruction of civil and government property.

A decision was taken at Cabinet level in 1998 to transfer the area to Mpumalanga. However, this was not done until 2000, when President Thabo Mbeki and his Cabinet amended the Constitution to legalise the transfer. Because of red tape, it was not until 2005 that Bushbuckridge was officially transferred to Mpumalanga.

== Geography ==
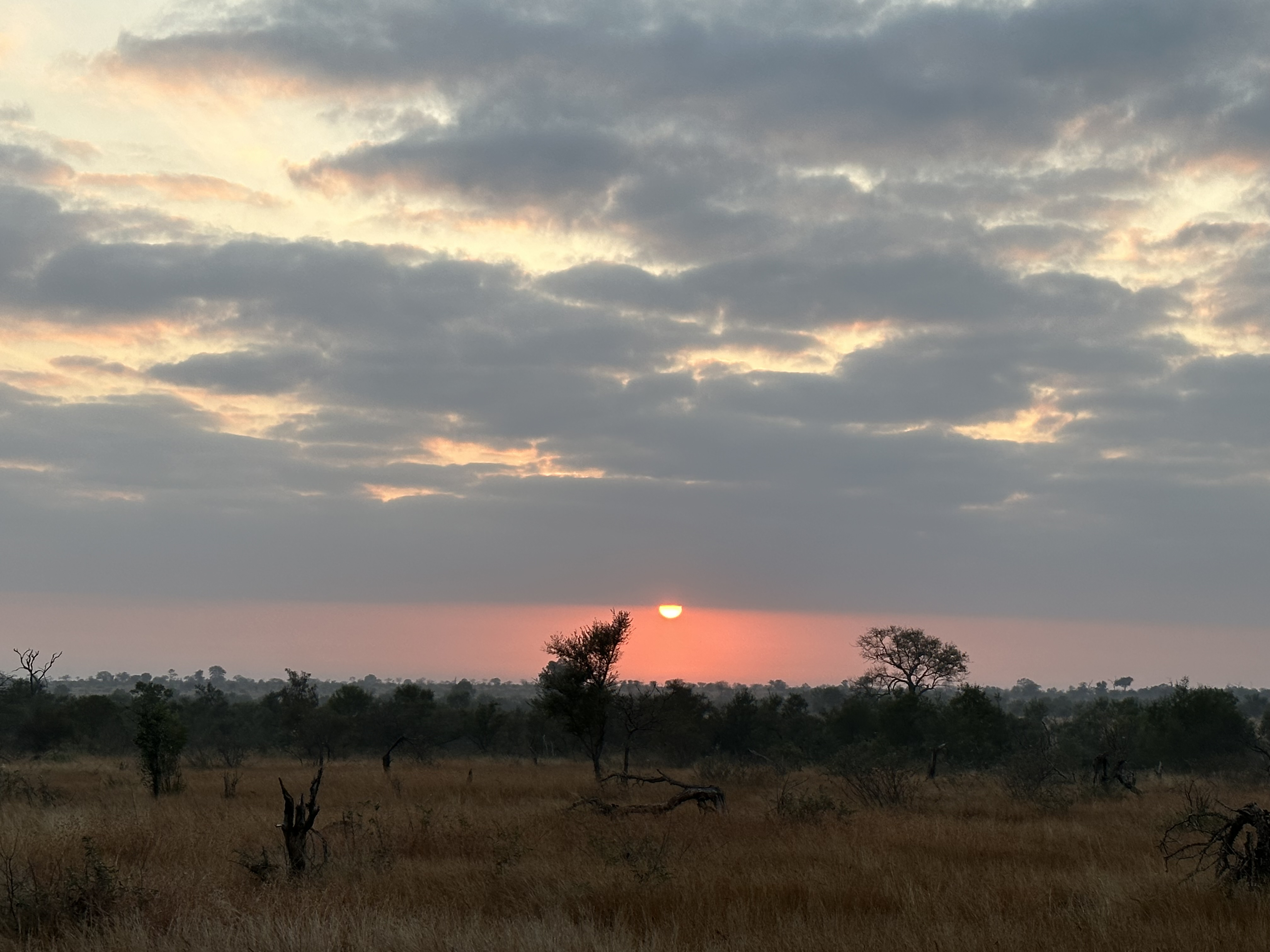
Kruger National Park's Orpen Gate

Bushbuckridge is bordered by Mopani District Municipality of Limpopo Province to the north, by Mozambique to the east, by Mbombela and Nkomazi Local Municipality to the south, and by Thaba Chweu and Maruleng Local Municipality to the west.

The 2013 proposal to adjust the border between the municipal area of Mbombela (MP322) and Bushbuckridge Local Municipalities (MP325) was approved for implementation in 2016.

== Demographics ==
The population of the municipality in the 2011 census was 541,248. The most-spoken first language is Tsonga with about 57%, followed by Northern Sotho language with about 25%.

== Administrative subdivisions ==
Bushbuckridge Local Municipality consists of 135 settlements and is divided into thirty-seven wards.

=== Main places ===
The 2001 census divided the municipality into the following main places:

Place	Code	Area (km^{2})	Population	Most spoken language
Amashangana	98601	84.12	10,877	Shangaan,
Bushbuckridge	98602	72.65	1,726	Northern Sotho,
College View	98603	1.78	1,927	Sotho
Hoxane	98604	53.19	39,617	Shangaan/Tsonga
Hoxani	98605	93.05	14,341	Shangaan
Jongilanga	98606	256.87	50,128	Shangaan
Malele	98607	16.08	11,637	Northern Sotho
Manyeleti	98608	185.69	114	Shangaan
Mapulaneng	98609	335.25	125000	Northern Sotho/Sepulana
Mathibela	98610	111.46	57,416	Swazi
Mnisi	98611	461.03	66,659	Shangaan
Moletele	98612	51.29	22,527	Northern Sotho
Moreipuso	98613	84.43	28,322	Northern Sotho
Sabi Sand Game Reserve	98614	4.70	134	English
Setlhare	98615	168.93	44,000	Northern Sotho
Thabakgolo	98616	100.14	53,624	Northern Sotho
Remainder of the municipality	88601	315.93	641	Northern Sotho

== Politics ==
The municipal council consists of seventy-six members elected by mixed-member proportional representation. Thirty-eight councillors are elected by first-past-the-post voting in thirty-eight wards, while the remaining thirty-eight are chosen from party lists so that the total number of party representatives is proportional to the number of votes received. In the election of 1 November 2021 the African National Congress (ANC) won a majority of fifty-three seats on the council.

The following table shows the results of the election.

Party	Ward			List			Total seats
Party	Votes	%	Seats	Votes	%	Seats	Total seats
African National Congress	65,486	63.28	37	69,546	68.33	16	53
Economic Freedom Fighters	10,119	9.78	0	11,183	10.99	8	8
Independent South African National Civic Organisation	5,876	5.68	1	6,628	6.51	4	5
Independent candidates	9,538	9.22	0				0
African People's Convention	2,527	2.44	0	2,974	2.92	2	2
Democratic Alliance	2,394	2.31	0	2,516	2.47	2	2
Better Residents Association	2,377	2.30	0	2,359	2.32	2	2
South Africa My Home Residents Association	1,686	1.63	0	1,715	1.69	1	1
Democratic Community Movement	979	0.95	0	987	0.97	1	1
Bushbuckridge Locals Movement	732	0.71	0	847	0.83	1	1
African Transformation Movement	558	0.54	0	604	0.59	1	1
10 other parties	1,214	1.17	0	2,418	2.38	0	0
Total	103,486	100.00	38	101,777	100.00	38	76
Valid votes	103,486	97.80		101,777	97.33		
Invalid/blank votes	2,333	2.20		2,791	2.67		
Total votes	105,819	100.00		104,568	100.00		
Registered voters/turnout	246,357	42.95		246,357	42.45		
