= Mlondi Mbanjwa =

South African soccer player

Personal information
- Date of birth: 21 July 1998 (age 28)
- Position: Defender

Team information
- Current team: AmaZulu
- Number: 15

Senior career*
Years	Team	Apps	(Gls)
2019–2022	Free State Stars	80	(5)
2022	Polokwane City	2	(0)
2023	Uthongathi	16	(3)
2023–	AmaZulu	13	(1)

International career^{‡}
2024–	South Africa	1	(0)
- * Club domestic league appearances and goals as of 27 March 2024 ‡ National team caps and goals as of 27 March 2024

Mlondi Mbanjwa (born 21 July 1998) is a South African soccer player who plays as a right back for AmaZulu in the Premier Soccer League.

He hails from Mariannhill. His career started modestly with Free State Stars, Polokwane City and Uthongathi in the National First Division. He was picked up by AmaZulu ahead of the 2023-24 South African Premier Division campaign, but did not start his first match until October 2023 against Orlando Pirates—where manager Pablo Franco Martin was forced to rotate the team because AmaZulu played their last match only two days prior. Nonetheless, Mbanjwa impressed enough into 2024 that he was called up to Bafana Bafana by Hugo Broos for the 2024 FIFA Series. Here, Mbanjwa made his international debut against Andorra, although South Africa only managed 1–1 against one of Europe's lowest ranked teams.
