= Mlambo =

Mlambo (Zulu pronunciation: [m̩lambo]) is a Zulu Xhosa, Swati and Ndebele surname. It can be related to the Zulu surnames Mtshali.

Notable people with this surname include:

- Dunstan Mlambo (born c. 1960), South African judge
- Johnson Mlambo (1940–2021), South African politician
- Lucas Mlambo (born 1959), Swazi painter
- Phumzile Mlambo-Ngcuka (born 1955), South African politician
- Sibongile Mlambo (born 1990), Zimbabwean actress
- Xolani Mlambo (born 1991), South African football player
