= Mlondi Mveli Mdluli =

South African politician

Member of the National Assembly of South Africa
- Incumbent
- Assumed office 14 June 2024

Personal details
- Born: 25 March 1998 (age 28)
- Party: Democratic Alliance
- Education: University of KwaZulu-Natal (MCom, BCom Honours (Cum Laude) and BCom)

Mlondi Mveli Mdluli (born 25 March 1998) is a South African economist, academic, and Member of Parliament (MP) for the Democratic Alliance. He is currently the youngest Member of Parliament in South Africa.

Mdluli was elected to the National Assembly of South Africa, following the 2024 South African general election, where he was 43rd on the national party list. He currently serves on the parliamentary Portfolio Committee on Trade, Industry and Competition. The committee focuses on scrutinising and reviewing legislation related to trade policies, industry regulations, and competitive practices to ensure alignment with national economic goals and the promotion of fair competition.

== Early life and education ==
Mdluli was born and raised in Durban. He is currently pursuing a Doctor of Philosophy (PhD) in Economics at the University of Reading, in the United Kingdom, on a privately funded scholarship. He holds a Master of Commerce (MCom) degree in Economics, for which he was awarded a scholarship by the University of KwaZulu-Natal. He also holds a Bachelor of Commerce Honours degree in Economics, which he completed cum laude with the support of a scholarship from the National Research Foundation (South Africa), as well as a Bachelor of Commerce (BCom) degree in Economics and Management, from the University of KwaZulu-Natal.

In his final year of undergraduate study, Mdluli's exceptional academic performance earned him a nomination for the prestigious Allan Gray Achievement Award.

He was the runner-up in the Association of Black Securities and Investment Professionals (ABSIP) National Budget Speech Competition in 2019.

In 2024, Mdluli was invited by Stellenbosch University to contribute an academic paper to its annual International Social Justice Conference, held in October that year and centred on the theme of food insecurity. He presented a paper titled "Factors Influencing Food Insecurity in South African Households: Insights from the 2023 General Household Survey."

Mdluli has maintained an ongoing association with the London School of Economics International Inequalities Institute (LSE III), contributing research and commentary across several years. In March 2025, he authored a column for the Institute titled: "Five things the G20 could do to help reduce inequality in South Africa". The column outlines how South Africa's historic G20 presidency, which it assumed in 2025, could help tackle inequality by fostering inclusive growth, promoting gender equality, and expanding opportunities for marginalised communities.

In May 2026, Mdluli was invited by the Institute to present, at a weekly seminar series, an academic paper he had authored as part of his PhD in Economics thesis, titled: "A post-apartheid analysis of intra-racial earnings inequality in South Africa". The following month, he authored a second column for the Institute titled: "Three decades after apartheid, South Africa's youth unemployment gap is still defined by race". The column reflects on the 50th anniversary of the Soweto Uprising and analyses the racial gap in youth unemployment that has widened over the past two decades, and what this means for South Africa's economic future.

== Early career ==
Upon completing a master's degree in economics, Mdluli joined the South African Institute of Race Relations as Campaign Manager. He was responsible for spearheading and managing campaigns on socio-economic issues affecting South Africa, with a primary goal to influence government policy.

In January 2024, Mdluli was appointed as a Senior Economic Researcher at the Centre for Risk Analysis, a leading South African think tank. During his time at the Centre for Risk Analysis, he notably developed the Maize Meal Porridge Index, a tool designed to illustrate the impact of food inflation on low-income households in South Africa.

Mdluli held his position at the Centre for Risk Analysis until his election to Parliament in June 2024.

== Parliamentary career ==
Mdluli was elected as a Member of Parliament, at the age of 26, following the 2024 South African general election. He is currently the youngest Member of Parliament in South Africa.

== See also ==
- List of National Assembly members of the 28th Parliament of South Africa
