= KaNyamazane =

Township in Mpumalanga, South Africa

KaNyamazane Lekazi
- Location within Mpumalanga Location within South Africa
- Coordinates: 25.284°S 31.103°E
- Country: South Africa
- Province: Mpumalanga
- District: Ehlanzeni
- Municipality: Mbombela

Area
  - Total: 10.81 km^{2} (4.17 sq mi)

Population (2011)
  - Total: 34,593
  - Density: 3,200/km^{2} (8,288/sq mi)

Racial makeup (2011)
  - Black African: 98.9%
  - Coloured: 0.5%
  - White: 0.4%
  - Other: 0.2%

First languages (2011)
  - SiSwati: 86.6%
  - Tsonga: 3.0%
  - Zulu: 2.9%
  - English: 2.5%
  - Other: 1.9%
- Time zone: UTC+2 (SAST)
- Postal code (street): 1214
- PO box: 1214
- Area code: 013

KaNyamazane, previously known as Lekazi, is a township in the City of Mbombela Local Municipality in Mpumalanga, South Africa and is situated approximately 26 kilometres (16.2 mi) east of its mother city, Mbombela.

It is bordered by the neighbouring townships of Msogwaba and Daantjie to the north and Tekwane to the west.

== History ==
It was established in 1978 as a labour reserve of Nelspruit (now renamed to Mbombela) and was recognised as a homeland township under the bantustan of KaNgwane. It was also formed as a result of a housing project for the employees of a mining processing company based in Nelspruit. The project, a joint initiative of the mining company and the Pretoria-based National Building Research Institute, allowed for several grades of home ownership. The project mainly encompassed basic types of housing which had to be completed by the owner, with supposed assistance from the company. The state also declared that it would make provision for semi-public and public land to be developed for communal use, by the community itself.

By 1980 a considerable number of families had settled in the houses built in KaNyamazane, but little or no communal activity had taken place, clearly displaying the limitations of self-assistance schemes for African citizens under apartheid conditions.

== Roads ==
KaNyamazane is mainly accessed by:

- KaNyamazane Road which connects directly with Mbombela via Tekwane and KaMagagu
- Turning off the N4 (to Mbombela and Malalane) onto Swan Street
- Chris Hani Street which connects with the neighbouring township of Daantjie
