= Nkomazi Local Municipality =

Nkomazi
- Local municipality
- Nkomazi Local Municipality
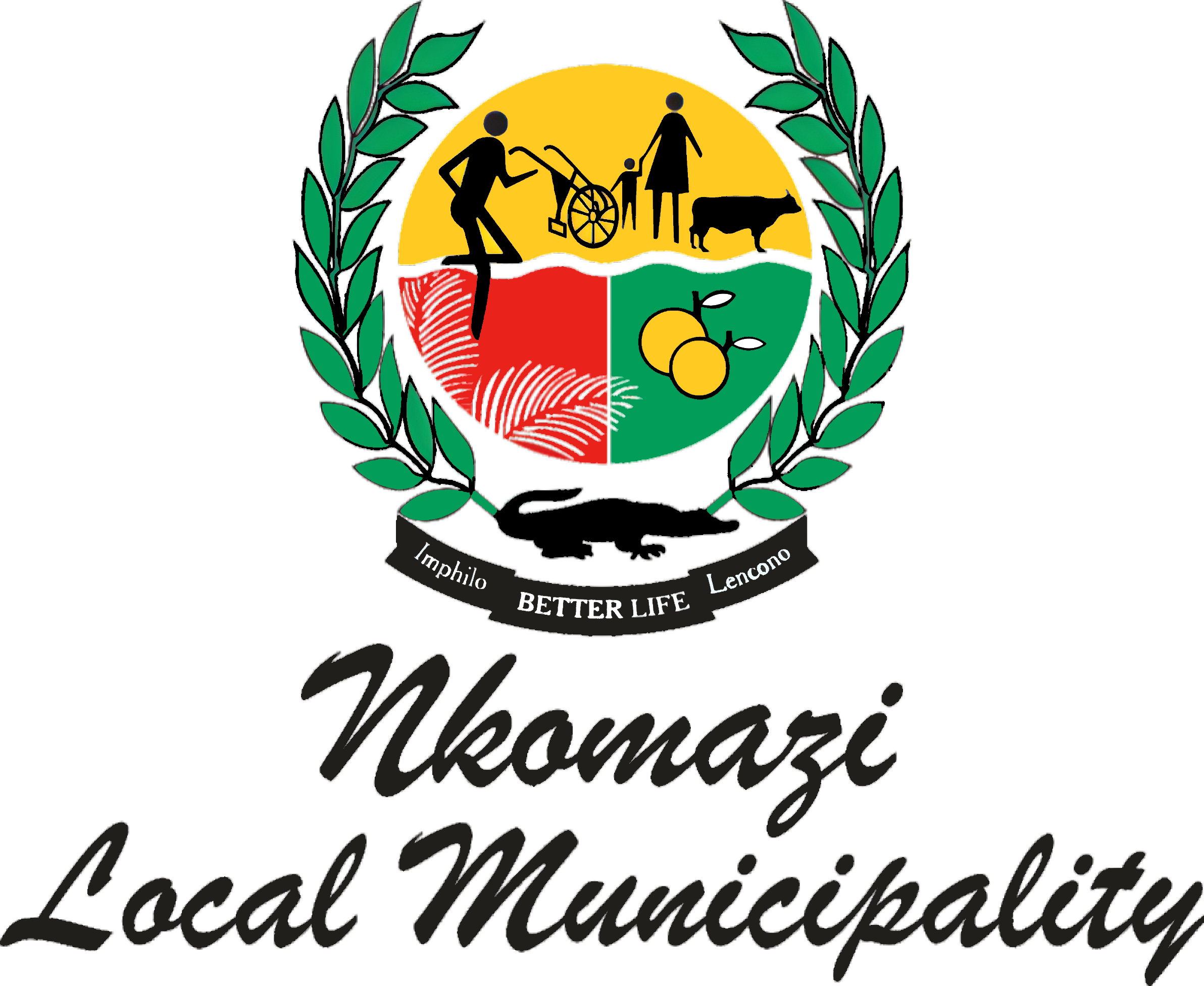
- Seal

- Location in Mpumalanga
- Coordinates: 25°40′S 31°40′E
- Country: South Africa
- Province: Mpumalanga
- District: Ehlanzeni
- Seat: Malalane
- Wards: 33

Government
  - Type: Municipal council
  - Mayor: Phindile Magagula (ANC)

Area
  - Total: 4,787 km^{2} (1,848 sq mi)

Population (2011)
  - Total: 390,610
  - Density: 81.60/km^{2} (211.3/sq mi)

Racial makeup (2011)
  - Black African: 97.7%
  - Coloured: 0.2%
  - Indian/Asian: 0.3%
  - White: 1.6%

First languages (2011)
  - Swazi: 88.5%
  - Tsonga: 6.8%
  - Afrikaans: 1.4%
  - English: 1.1%
  - Other: 2.2%
- Time zone: UTC+2 (SAST)
- Municipal code: MP324
- Website: https://www.nkomazi.gov.za/

Nkomazi Localal Municipality (Swazi: Masipaladi wase Nkomazi) is a local municipality within the Ehlanzeni District Municipality, in the Mpumalanga province of South Africa. Malalane is the seat of the municipality.

== Main places ==
The 2001 census divided the municipality into the following main places:

Place	Code	Area (km^{2})	Population	Most spoken language
Albertsnek	81701	0.02	108	Swazi
Hectorspruit	81703	2.97	309	Afrikaans
Hoyi	81704	57.13	10,777	Swazi
Inyoni	81705	0.13	748	Tsonga
Kamhlushwa	81706	0.61	2,078	Swazi
Komatipoort	81707	5.52	1,443	Afrikaans
Lugedlane	81708	123.79	29,816	Swazi
Malalane	81709	14.23	2,241	Afrikaans
Marloth Park	81710	17.70	469	Afrikaans
Matsamo Part 1	81711	392.15	105,277	Swazi
Matsamo Part 2	81718	1.11	3,659	Swazi
Mawewe	81712	238.62	21,038	Swazi
Mhlaba	81713	80.27	17,376	Swazi
Mlambo	81714	282.62	29,372	Swazi
Siboshwa	81716	160.58	71,719	Swazi
Strathmore Mine	81717	4.26	343	Swazi
Remainder of the municipality	81715	1,833.87	35,837	Swazi

== Politics ==
The municipal council consists of sixty-five members elected by mixed-member proportional representation. Thirty-three are elected by first-past-the-post voting in thirty-three wards, while the remaining thirty-two are chosen from party lists so that the total number of party representatives is proportional to the number of votes received. In the election of 1 November 2021 the African National Congress (ANC) won a majority of fifty seats on the council.

The following table shows the results of the 2021 election.

Party	Ward			List			Total seats
Party	Votes	%	Seats	Votes	%	Seats	Total seats
African National Congress	53,502	69.61	33	58,121	75.89	17	50
Economic Freedom Fighters	9,236	12.02	0	11,085	14.47	9	9
Democratic Alliance	4,191	5.45	0	4,283	5.59	4	4
Independent candidates	7,504	9.76	0				0
African Transformation Movement	724	0.94	0	773	1.01	1	1
Freedom Front Plus	630	0.82	0	682	0.89	1	1
8 other parties	1,069	1.39	0	1,640	2.14	0	0
Total	76,856	100.00	33	76,584	100.00	32	65
Valid votes	76,856	98.23		76,584	98.02		
Invalid/blank votes	1,388	1.77		1,550	1.98		
Total votes	78,244	100.00		78,134	100.00		
Registered voters/turnout	172,783	45.28		172,783	45.22		

=== By-elections from November 2021 ===
The following by-elections were held to fill vacant ward seats in the period from November 2021. A number of ANC councillors were expelled by the party after working with the Economic Freedom Fighters (EFF) to elect Johan Mkhatshwa, former mayor and the top-ranked ANC candidate on the proportional list, elected as mayor. The ANC candidates won both available seats in the August by-elections, although the party received less than 50% of the votes in ward 10. The EFF won the October by-election in ward 11, its first ward win in the province.

Date	Ward	Party of the previous councillor	Party of the newly elected councillor
31 August 2022	10	African National Congress	African National Congress
31 August 2022	13	African National Congress	African National Congress
19 October 2022	11	African National Congress	Economic Freedom Fighters

== Others ==
Nkomazi municipality is home to giant processors of sugar cane the Selati Company and to various coal mines.The municipality has a gate to the country's biggest National park, The Kruger National Park.

Nkomazi Municipality serve as a link between Mozambique and South Africa at the Lebombo border.There are also multiple border posts between South Africa and Swaziland.
