= Mbombela =

Capital of Mpumalanga province in South Africa

Mbombela Nelspruit
- City
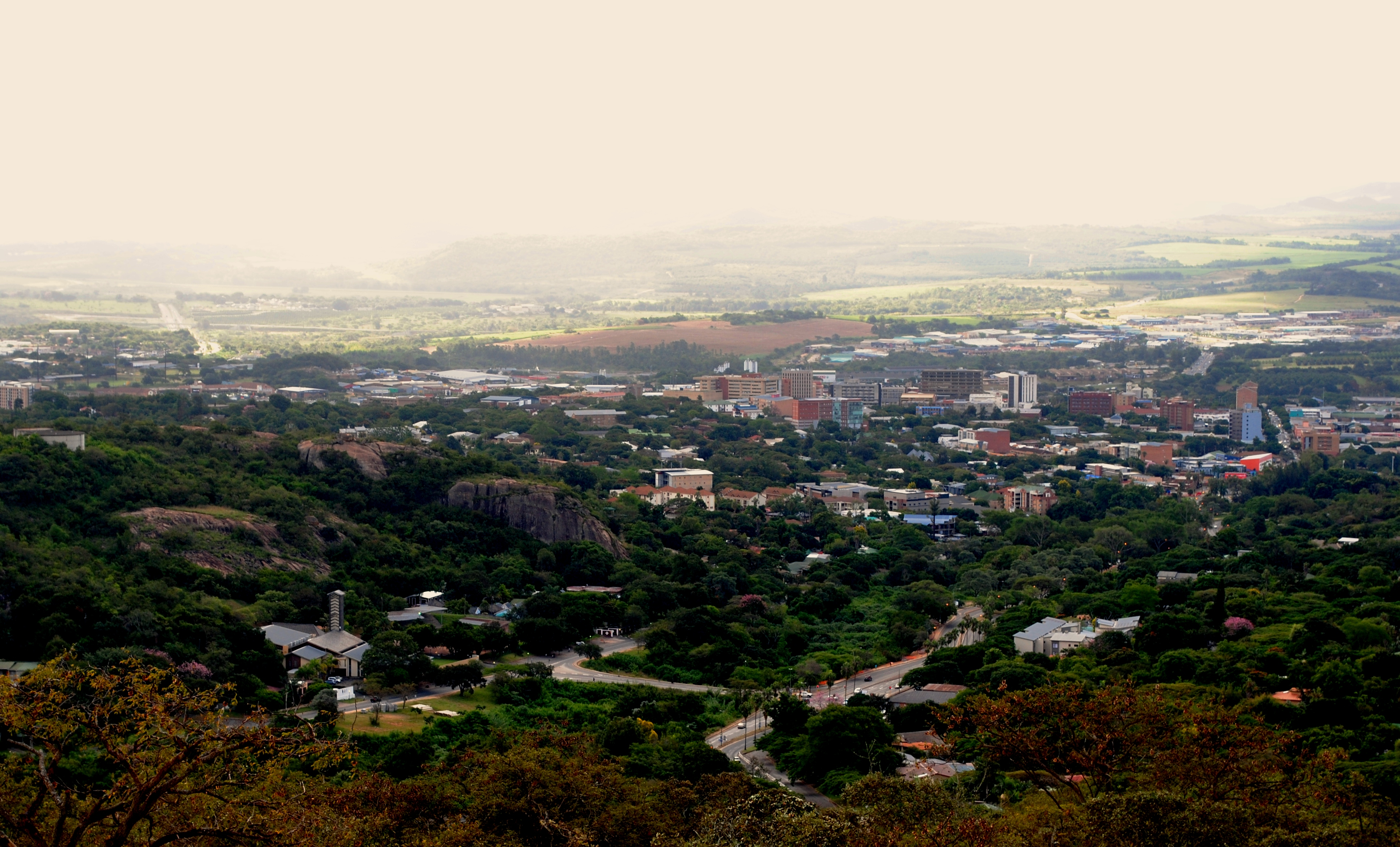
- A view of the CBD of the city as seen from the Steiltes suburb
- Nicknames: eNaspoti, Citrus City, Gateway to the Lowveld
- Motto: City of Excellence
- Location within Mpumalanga Location within South Africa Location within Africa
- Coordinates: 25°27′57″S 30°59′07″E
- Country: South Africa
- Province: Mpumalanga
- District: Ehlanzeni
- Municipality: Mbombela
- Established: 1905

Government
  - Executive Mayor: Sibusiso Mathonsi

Area
  - Total: 72.63 km^{2} (28.04 sq mi)

Population (2011)
  - Total: 58,672
  - Density: 807.8/km^{2} (2,092/sq mi)

Racial makeup (2011)
  - White: 49.3%
  - Black African: 41.1%
  - Indian/Asian: 4.9%
  - Coloured: 4.1%
  - Other: 0.6%

First languages (2011)
  - Afrikaans: 40.7%
  - English: 22.4%
  - Swazi: 20.2%
  - Tsonga: 4.7%
  - Other: 12.1%
- Time zone: UTC+2 (SAST)
- Postal code (street): 1200
- PO box: 1200
- Area code: 013

Mbombela, formerly Nelspruit, is a city in northeastern South Africa. It is the capital of the Mpumalanga province. Located on the Crocodile River, the city lies about 110 km (68 mi) by road west of the Mozambique border, 330 km (210 mi) east of Johannesburg and 82 km (51 mi) north of the Eswatini border. Mbombela was one of the host cities of the 2010 FIFA World Cup.

== History ==
San rock art and Iron Age archaeological evidence indicate the area has a long history of human habitation. Construction for the Mpumalanga legislature revealed farming settlements, storage pits, burial sites, and pottery ranging from the 6th to 17th century. The presence of cattle bones at the Riverside site is thought to be evidence that early Nguni practices of labola originated in eastern South Africa.

The city was founded in 1895 by three brothers of the Nel family who grazed their cattle around the site in the winter months; the name is pronounced [ˈnɛl.sprœy̯t], and derives from their surname and an Afrikaans term meaning, 'stream that is dry in the summer'. During the Boer War, Nelspruit served briefly as the seat of government for the South African Republic, an independent Boer republic.

The settlement was a key stopover for the Eastern Railway built by the Netherlands-South African Railway Company in the late 19th century which ran from the newly discovered Witwatersrand goldfields to Delagoa Bay in Portuguese East Africa (modern-day Maputo, Mozambique). The discovery of gold in Mpumalanga, such as at Pilgrim's Rest and Barberton, encouraged further development.

The history of Nelspruit occurred along segregated lines. Under apartheid's policy of separate development, Black people were forcibly removed from the town to Lekazi, Kanyamazane, and other outlying areas as menial labour reserve. In the early 1970s, Nelpark was formed as a Coloured district and Valencia Park as a South Asian area in the town. Youth centres, public amenities, and schools such as Nelspruit Laerskool were reserved for the town's white population.

=== Name change ===
In October 2009, the South African government renamed the city "Mbombela", the name of the local municipality. The Kruger Lowveld Chamber of Business and Tourism subsequently approached the High Court of South Africa to challenge the decision, citing a lack of both consultation and city funds available to pay for roadsign and website name changes. Ultimately, the name change was upheld in May 2014 by the North Gauteng High Court. Mbombela means "many people together in a small space" in Siswati.

== Education and research institutions ==
The city has four major public high schools and a TVET college (Ehlanzeni); more schools across all age groups are being built in response to overcrowding.

The city hosts the University of Mpumalanga (UMP). Established in 2014 with an intake of 140 students, it had over 4,300 students as of 2020. The Tshwane University of Technology has a satellite campus in the city with over 1,500 students, and UNISA has an office offering online courses.

The city is home to the Agricultural Research Council's Institute for Tropical and Subtropical Crops and the Lowveld National Botanical Garden. Citrus Research International (CRI) has a major facility in the city. The Lowveld College of Agriculture, located near UMP, also conducts research in the field of botany.

== Government ==
Mbombela is the capital of Mpumalanga, so hosts the Mpumalanga Provincial Legislature. The city is also the seat of the Ehlanzeni District Municipality, and the largest city within the Mbombela Local Municipality.

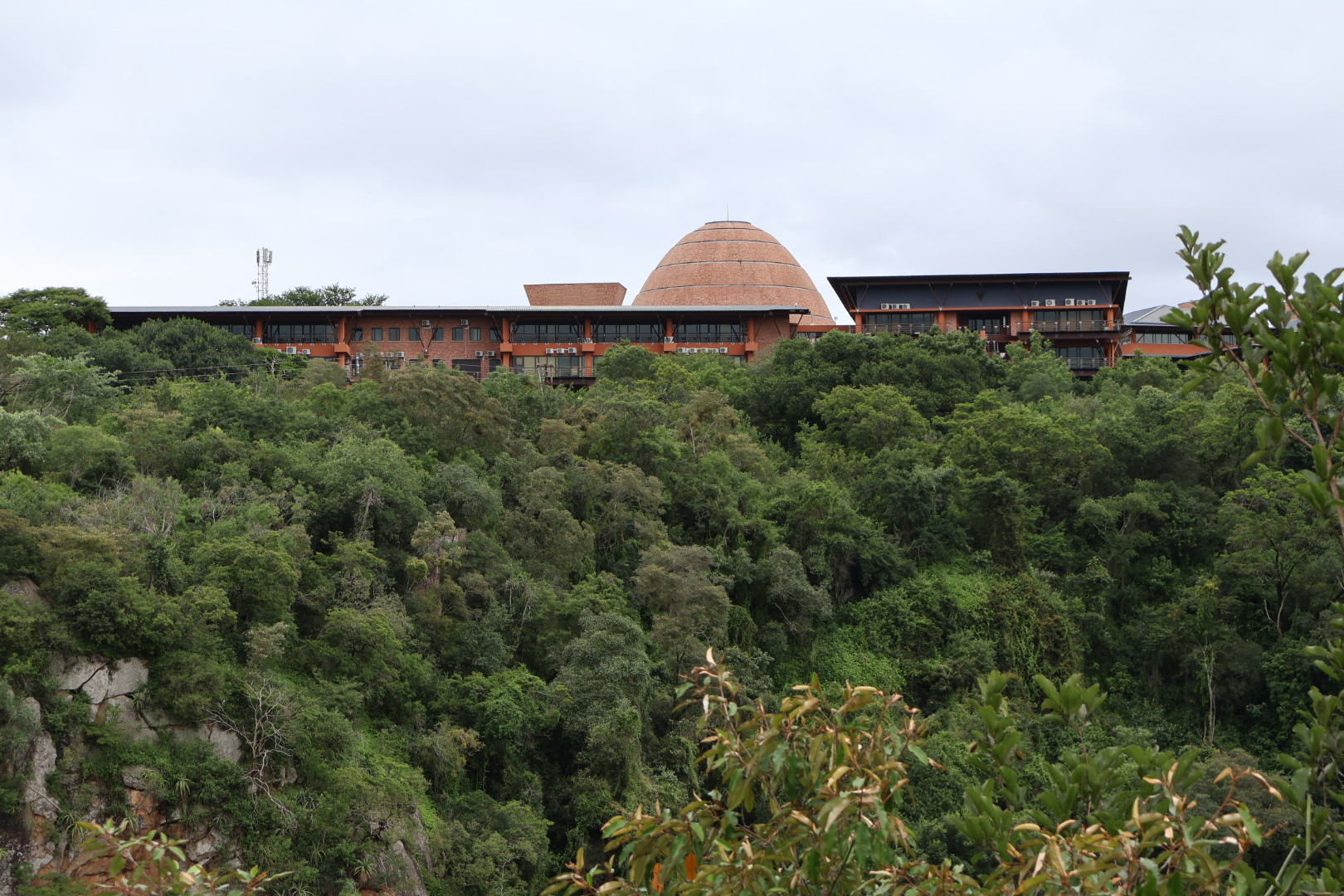
Mpumalanga Provincial Legislature, as viewed from the Lowveld National Botanical Gardens

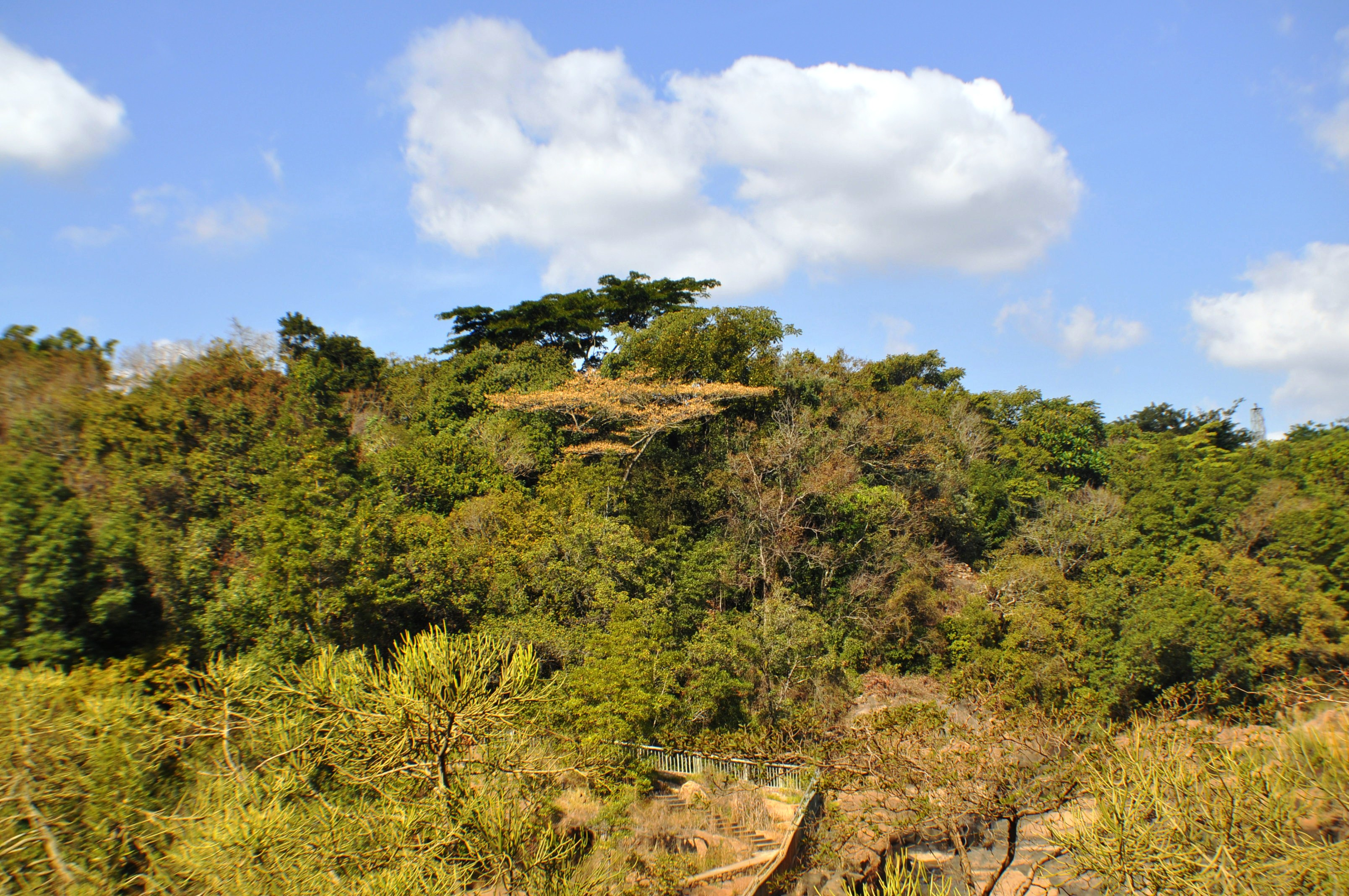
Lowveld National Botanical Garden

== Transport ==
=== Road ===
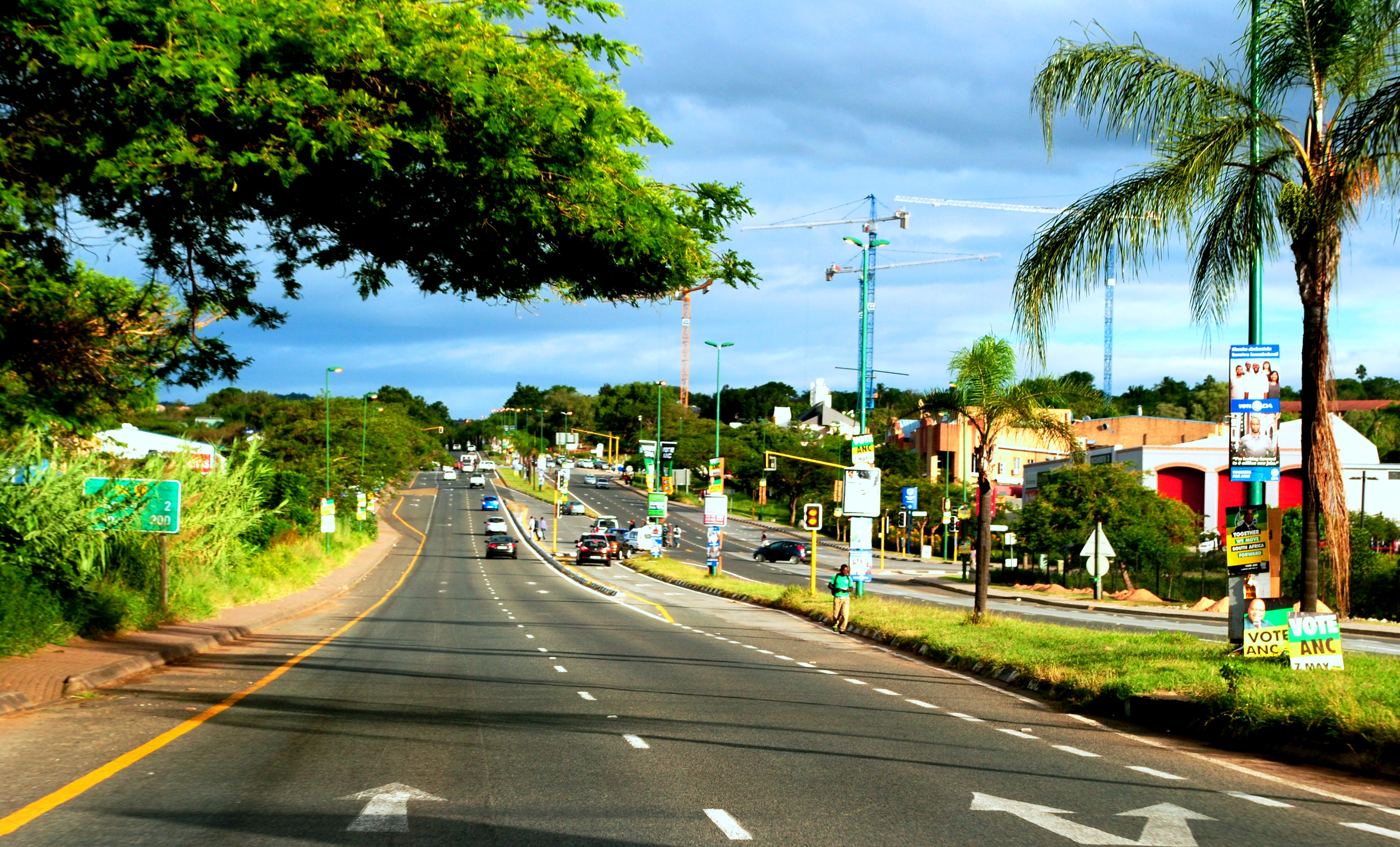
The Main Road (Old N4; now R104) entering the city

The city is on the Maputo Corridor, a major trade route linking Pretoria to Maputo in Mozambique which, with the Trans-Kalahari Corridor, forms a transport trunk that crosses the entire sub-continent from Walvis Bay in Namibia on the Atlantic Ocean to Maputo on the Indian Ocean. The N4 toll route is the main arterial route forming the Maputo Corridor, connecting to eMalahleni and Pretoria in the west with Maputo in the east.

A new Northern Bypass was built for the N4 toll route (opened on 13 June 2010) and the old road through the city centre (Samora Machel Drive) was redesignated as the R104 route. Other roads in the area include the R40 route (which connects to Barberton, a border with eSwatini in the south and with White River in the north) and the R37 route (which connects to Mashishing in the north-west).

Tolling

The N4, managed by Trans African Concessions (TRAC), involves payment of toll: Traffic heading on the N4 E (the direction of Maputo) must pass through the Nkomazi Toll Plaza, about 42 kilometres (26 mi) east of Mbombela, while traffic heading on the N4 W (the direction of eMalahleni) must pass through the Machado Toll Plaza, about 107 kilometres (66 mi) west of Mbombela.

=== Rail ===
Mbombela railway station lies on the Pretoria–Maputo railway.

=== Air ===
Kruger Mpumalanga International Airport, located about 27 km (17 mi) north east of the city, began operations in October 2002. Scheduled flights operate to locations within South Africa and abroad (to Zambia, Zimbabwe and Mozambique). The R 360,000,000 complex has a 3,100 m (10,000 ft) runway which can accommodate aircraft up to the size of a Boeing 747. The airport currently handles about 250,000 passengers per annum.

Nelspruit Airport, located about 9 km (6 mi) south west of the city, is the city's original airport owned and operated by the municipality. It primarily handles general aviation aircraft, and several aircraft maintenance, firefighting, charter and training companies are based at the airport.

== Suburbs and townships ==
This list includes suburbs within the city proper of Mbombela as well as surrounding satellite townships and villages:

- West Acres
- Steiltes
- Orchards
- Sonheuwel
- Riverside
- Alkmaar
- Nelsville
- Valencia Park
- Nelindia
- Stonehenge
- Kaapschehoop
- Kamagugu
- KaNyamazane
- Vintonia
- The Rest
- Mbombela Central
- Ngodwana
- Pumlanga
- Pienaar
- Schagen
- KaBokweni
- Matsulu
- Karino
- Masoyi
- KaMsogwaba

== Tourism ==
The city is a major stopover point for tourists travelling to Kruger National Park and to Mozambique. Other tourism attractions nearby include Sudwala Caves, and God's Window in the Blyde River Canyon Nature Reserve, a lookout point which provides a panoramic view over the famous Drakensberg Escarpment. The city is the nearest major South African city to Mozambique's capital, Maputo, and as such the city receives significant tourism from Mozambican locals. The city is also home to the Lowveld National Botanical Garden, set in 154 hectares of land along the eastern bank of the Crocodile River and containing around 500 species of plant species indigenous to the area.

== Sport ==
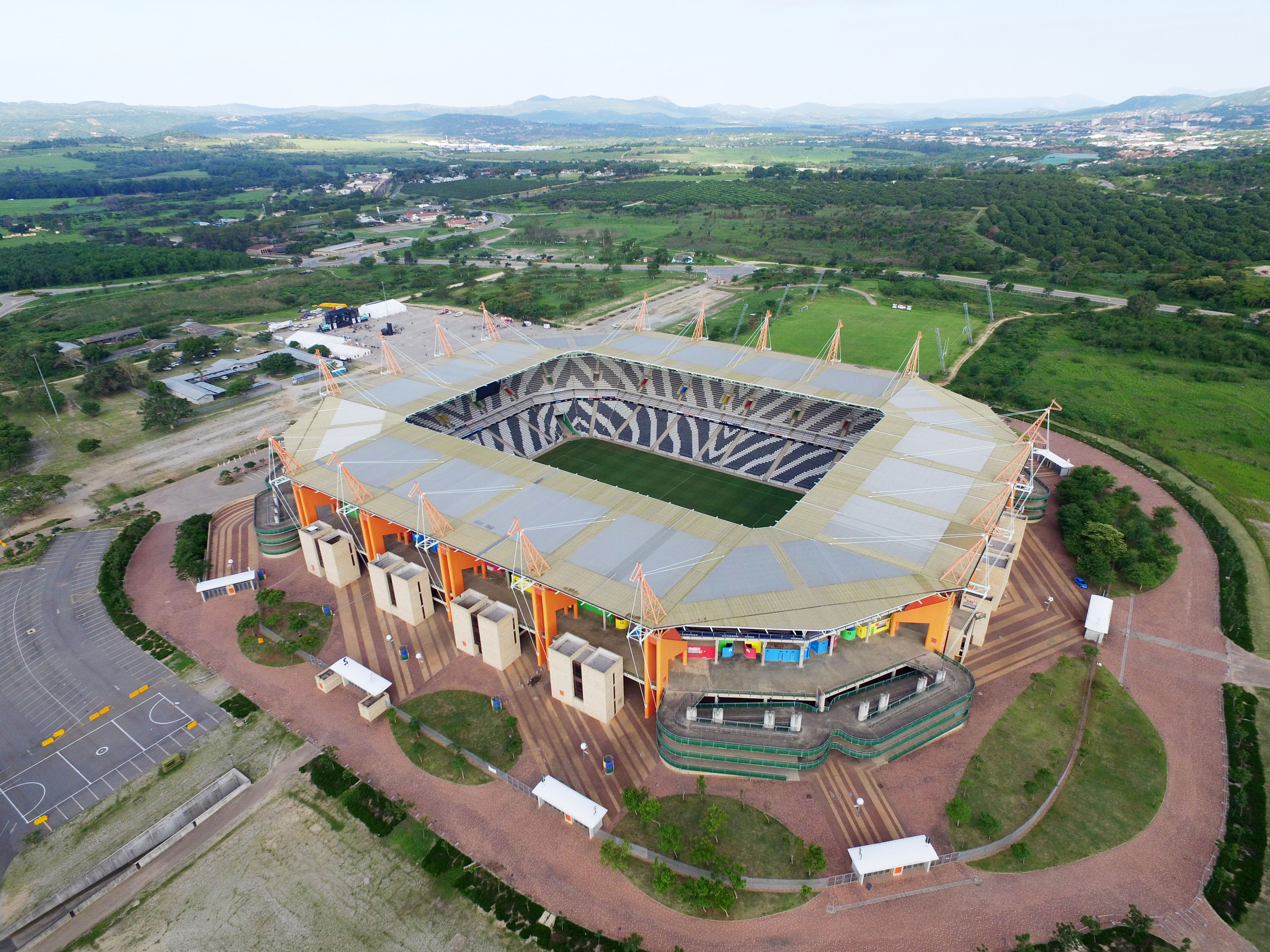
Mbombela Stadium

=== Alkmaar Raceway ===
The Alkmaar Raceway is a motocross track. It hosted the 2008 FIM Motocross World Championship South African Motocross Grand Prix.

=== Mbombela Stadium ===
Mbombela Stadium was built as an association football and rugby union stadium for the 2010 FIFA World Cup. Finished in November 2009 and costing R 1,200,000,000, it has a capacity of 43,500; and the construction process contained several controversies. The stadium hosted four 2010 FIFA World Cup matches and is the current home of the Pumas rugby team.

In 2013 it hosted two rugby test matches between Italy and Samoa, followed by South Africa and Scotland.

=== Mbombela Golf Club ===
Mbombela Golf Club was originally the Nelspruit Golf Club until 2017. Following an incident in which a black caddie was allegedly assaulted by four white golfers, the club's name was changed, alongside other commitments to increase the number of black staff and pay caddies a basic salary.

== Media ==
=== Print ===
Lowveld Media is a major printer and publisher of newsprint materials in the region. Major newspapers include the Lowvelder, Mpumalanga News and Nelspruit Post. African Eye News Service is an established news agency in the city which writes articles for national newspapers and websites.

=== Broadcasting ===
The SABC has a regional office in the city. Jacaranda FM operates a studio near the Emnotweni Casino.

Ligwalagwala FM is the largest SABC-owned radio station in the city and the Mpumalanga Province. It is a public broadcaster which primarily broadcasts in the Swazi language.

RISE FM (originally named MPowerFM before it was bought out by the Times Media Group) is an independent commercial radio station broadcasting in English from studios in the city and eMalahleni to the province of Mpumalanga, and the Afrikaans local community radio station Radio Laeveld 100.5fm broadcasts to the Lowveld area from the city.

The town is mentioned in the TV show The Chelsea Detective S2 E3.

== Culture ==
Mbombela Public Library

The city contains several entertainment venues, the most prominent being the Emnotweni Casino complex. The city has a civic centre (built in 1994) with a large theatre, which can be hired by both amateurs and professionals, but recently the centre has fallen into disrepair. Mbombela has its own version of concert in the park with annual performances by musicians in the Lowveld National Botanical Gardens.

Mbombela has several local public libraries including Mbombela Public Library, Valencia Park Public Library, Nelsville Public Library. Libraries offer free internet, computer and study space access, in addition to enabling library card holders to borrow books.

== Economy ==
In 2021, the average monthly household income in Mbombela was R11,089. In 2019, Mbombela had a Gini Coeffcient of 0.671.

=== Finance ===
The Mbombela's Gross Geographic Product is 7,3 billion. The city is the financial and banking capital of Mpumalanga.

=== Retail ===
The city has a strong consumer-based retail industry boosted significantly by neighbouring Mozambican and Swazi tourists. There are various major shopping centers, notably the Riverside and Ilanga malls. Recent developments include the Crossing Shopping Center and the City Center. The international grilled-chicken fast food restaurant chain Galito's was founded and is headquartered in the city.

=== Industry ===
The city is home to the Manganese Metal Company (MMC) and Delta EMD, which together form one of the largest manganese processing facilities in the world. There are several medium industries which support the agriculture and forestry sectors.

=== Agriculture ===
The city is a key agricultural processing hub for northeastern South Africa. The macadamia industry is centred within the city, with an annual production for the 2017/18 production year of 26,400 tons NIS (nut-in shell at 1.5% kernel moisture content). There are many citrus farms and the canning, juicing and extract of citrus fruit and other produce is a large business for the area. Fertile soils and the subtropical climate provide perfect conditions for the growing of citrus and tropical fruits, mainly mango, banana, avocado, papaya and macadamia nuts.

Sugar is also big business in the region. TSB, the producer of Selati sugar, is located a few kilometres east of the city. The low-lying areas in the region is dotted with sugarcane farms.

=== Forestry ===
The economy is heavily reliant on the forestry sector. SAPPI has a paper mill in the small town of Ngodwana, about 44 km south-west of the city which was recently upgraded to produce cellulose fibers for various applications. The city is the global headquarters of KISHUGU which is the parent company of Working on Fire. KISHUGU is also a major player in the forestry sector. The region has several timber-related industries such as lumber and saw mills as well as furniture, crate and carton manufacturing businesses.

== International relations ==
The city is twinned with:

- Maia, Portugal

Mozambique has a consulate in the city.

== Climate ==
The city features a humid subtropical climate (Köppen Cwa) with mild winters and hot summers. Summers are hot and somewhat humid complete with high precipitation. Winters in the city are dry, with relatively warm temperatures during the day and chilly temperatures at night.

Climate data for Nelspruit/Mbombela
Month	Jan	Feb	Mar	Apr	May	Jun	Jul	Aug	Sep	Oct	Nov	Dec	Year
Record high °C (°F)	40 (104)	39 (102)	38 (100)	36 (97)	35 (95)	32 (90)	32 (90)	35 (95)	38 (100)	40 (104)	38 (100)	38 (100)	40 (104)
Mean daily maximum °C (°F)	29 (84)	29 (84)	28 (82)	27 (81)	25 (77)	23 (73)	23 (73)	25 (77)	27 (81)	27 (81)	27 (81)	28 (82)	27 (81)
Mean daily minimum °C (°F)	19 (66)	19 (66)	18 (64)	14 (57)	10 (50)	6 (43)	6 (43)	9 (48)	12 (54)	14 (57)	17 (63)	18 (64)	13 (55)
Record low °C (°F)	11 (52)	11 (52)	10 (50)	5 (41)	2 (36)	−2 (28)	−1 (30)	−1 (30)	2 (36)	5 (41)	10 (50)	10 (50)	−2 (28)
Average precipitation mm (inches)	127 (5.0)	108 (4.3)	90 (3.5)	51 (2.0)	15 (0.6)	9 (0.4)	10 (0.4)	10 (0.4)	26 (1.0)	75 (3.0)	115 (4.5)	131 (5.2)	767 (30.2)
Average precipitation days	14	12	12	7	4	2	2	3	5	11	15	14	100
Source: South African Weather Service

== Nature Conservation ==
Mbombela includes several nature reserves in and around the city. These include:

- Nelspruit Nature Reserve
- Steiltes nature reserve
- Riverside Reserve
- Umhloti Nature Reserve
- Barberton Nature Reserve

== People ==
- Beth Diane Armstrong, sculptor
- Matthew Clay, swimmer, gold medallist in the 50m backstroke at the 2006 Commonwealth Games (representing England)
- Faf de Klerk, Springbok rugby player
- Cliff Drysdale, professional tennis player and television presenter
- Robert Gumede, businessman
- Anton Haig, professional golfer
- Janneman Malan, Proteas cricket team player
- Pieter Malan, South Africa national cricket team player
- Rebecca Malope, gospel music personality
- Mandisa Mashego, member of the Gauteng Provincial Legislature
- Heyneke Meyer, Springbok rugby coach
- Nicholas Nkuna, actor
- Ray Phiri, musician
- Monique Smit, professional golfer
- Renske Stoltz, South Africa national netball team player
- Lucas Thwala, South Africa national football team player
- Duane Vermeulen, Springbok rugby player
- Pedrie Wannenburg, Springbok rugby player
- Costa Titch, Hip Hop personality
