= Mbombela Local Municipality =

City of Mbombela Local Municipality
- Local municipality
- Seal

- Location in Mpumalanga
- Coordinates: 25°25′S 30°55′E
- Country: South Africa
- Province: Mpumalanga
- District: Ehlanzeni
- Seat: Mbombela
- Wards: 45

Government
  - Type: Municipal council
  - Mayor: Sibongile Makhushe-Mazibuko (African National Congress)

Area
  - Total: 5,394 km^{2} (2,083 sq mi)

Population (2011)
  - Total: 588,794
  - Density: 109.2/km^{2} (282.7/sq mi)

Racial makeup (2011)
  - Black African: 89.4%
  - Coloured: 0.9%
  - Indian/Asian: 0.7%
  - White: 8.7%

First languages (2011)
  - Swazi: 78.7%
  - Afrikaans: 6.8%
  - English: 4.6%
  - Tsonga: 4.1%
  - Other: 5.8%
- Time zone: UTC+2 (SAST)
- Municipal code: MP322

Mbombela Municipality (Swazi: Masipaladi wase Mbombela) is a local municipality within the Ehlanzeni District Municipality, in the Mpumalanga province of South Africa. Mbombela is a siSwati word meaning "a lot of people in a small space".

== Merger with Umjindi ==
At the time of the 2016 municipal elections, Umjindi Local Municipality was disestablished and merged into the Mbombela Local Municipality. So, the town of Barberton is now part of the Mbombela Local Municipality.

== Main places ==
The 2001 census divided the municipality into the following main places:

Place	Code	Area (km^{2})	Population	Most spoken language
Broedershoek	81501	0.60	265	Swazi
Gutshwa	81502	179.94	34,388	Swazi
Hazyview	81503	4.69	1,287	Afrikaans
KaBokweni	81504	4.49	12,949	Swazi
Kanyamazane	81505	15.33	36,020	Swazi
Khamagugu	81506	1.57	1,890	Swazi
Lomshiyo	81507	16.72	815	Swazi
Masoyi	81508	60.88	54,172	Swazi
Mataffin	81509	30.18	3,723	Swazi
Matsulu	81510	11.64	37,792	Swazi
Mbuyane	81512	88.69	57,213	Swazi
Mdluli	81513	21.22	2,753	Swazi
Mpakeni	81514	83.71	24,066	Swazi
Msogwaba	81515	37.83	82,509	Swazi
Nakambeni	81516	0.23	721	Swazi
Mbombela	81517	46.47	21,540	Afrikaans
Ngodini	81518	0.11	367	Swazi
Ngodwana	81519	1.14	759	Afrikaans
Nkambeni	81520	120.72	46,746	Swazi
Nsikazi Part 1	81521	42.35	1,411	Swazi
Nsikazi Part 2	81525	1.01	118	Swazi
Rocky Drift	81522	3.18	150	Afrikaans
Wendywood	81523	0.30	57	English
White River	81524	23.15	8,211	Afrikaans
Remainder of the municipality	81511	2,529.46	44,904	Swazi

== Politics ==
The municipal council consists of ninety members elected by mixed-member proportional representation. Forty-five councillors are elected by first-past-the-post voting in forty-five wards, while the remaining forty-five are chosen from party lists so that the total number of party representatives is proportional to the number of votes received. In the election of 1 November 2021 the African National Congress (ANC) won a majority of fifty-nine seats on the council.

The following table shows the results of the election.

Party	Ward			List			Total seats
Party	Votes	%	Seats	Votes	%	Seats	Total seats
African National Congress	82,923	64.50	41	84,658	65.92	18	59
Economic Freedom Fighters	18,780	14.61	0	18,948	14.76	14	14
Democratic Alliance	17,386	13.52	4	17,406	13.55	8	12
Freedom Front Plus	4,221	3.28	0	4,137	3.22	3	3
Independent candidates	2,596	2.02	0				0
African Christian Democratic Party	1,101	0.86	0	1,141	0.89	1	1
African Transformation Movement	947	0.74	0	1,001	0.78	1	1
5 other parties	609	0.47	0	1,126	0.88	0	0
Total	128,563	100.00	45	128,417	100.00	45	90
Valid votes	128,563	98.73		128,417	98.58		
Invalid/blank votes	1,655	1.27		1,844	1.42		
Total votes	130,218	100.00		130,261	100.00		
Registered voters/turnout	318,116	40.93		318,116	40.95		
