= Ehlanzeni District Municipality =

Ehlanzeni
- District municipality
- Seal

- Location in South Africa
- Coordinates: 25.450°S 30.983°E
- Country: South Africa
- Province: Mpumalanga
- Seat: Mbombela
- Local municipalities: List: Thaba Chweu; Mbombela; Umjindi; Nkomazi; Bushbuckridge

Government
  - Type: Municipal council
  - Mayor: Jesta Sidell (ANC)

Area
  - Total: 27,896 km^{2} (10,771 sq mi)

Population (2011)
  - Total: 1,688,615
  - Density: 60.533/km^{2} (156.78/sq mi)

Racial makeup (2011)
  - Black African: 94.0%
  - Coloured: 0.6%
  - Indian/Asian: 0.4%
  - White: 4.7%

First languages (2011)
  - Swazi: 54.5%
  - Tsonga: 21.8%
  - Northern Sotho: 10.3%
  - Afrikaans: 4.0%
  - Other: 9.4%
- Time zone: UTC+2 (SAST)
- Municipal code: DC32

Ehlanzeni is one of the 3 districts of Mpumalanga province of South Africa. The seat of Ehlanzeni is Mbombela. The majority of its 944 665 people speak SiSwati (2001 Census). The district code is DC32.

== Geography ==
=== Neighbours ===
Ehlanzeni is surrounded by:

- Mopani (DC33) to the north
- The republic of Mozambique to the east
- The kingdom of Eswatini to the south
- Gert Sibande (DC30) to the south
- Nkangala (DC31) to the south-west
- Sekhukhune (CBDC3) to the north-west

=== Local municipalities ===
The district contains the following local municipalities:

Local municipality	Population	%	Dominant language
Mbombela	528 550	55.95%	Swazi
Nkomazi	334 419	35.40%	Swazi
Thaba Chweu	81 238	8.60%	Northern Sotho
Bushbuckridge	495 000	0.05%	Tsonga

== Demographics ==
The following statistics are from the 2001 census.

Language	Population	%
SiSwati	737 534	78.07%
Xitsonga	64 987	6.88%
Sepedi	40 513	4.29%
Afrikaans	39 731	4.21%
English	18 103	1.92%
IsiZulu	16 311	1.73%
Sesotho	16 092	1.70%
Setswana	3 478	0.37%
IsiNdebele	2 411	0.26%
Other	2 407	0.25%
IsiXhosa	2 260	0.24%
Tshivenda	875	0.09%

=== Gender ===
Gender	Population	%
Female	491 212	52.00%
Male	453 453	48.00%

=== Ethnic group ===
Ethnic group	Population	%
Black African	889 436	94.15%
White	45 809	4.85%
Coloured	6 851	0.73%
Indian/Asian	2 569	0.27%

=== Age ===
Age	Population	%
000–004	108 898	11.53%
005–009	112 747	11.94%
010–014	116 683	12.35%
015–019	113 504	12.02%
020–024	93 023	9.85%
025–029	85 374	9.04%
030–034	68 929	7.30%
035–039	61 112	6.47%
040–044	44 885	4.75%
045–049	37 270	3.95%
050–054	27 034	2.86%
055–059	18 573	1.97%
060–064	18 662	1.98%
065–069	12 453	1.32%
070–074	11 883	1.26%
075–079	5 698	0.60%
080–084	5 132	0.54%
085–089	1 525	0.16%
090–094	804	0.09%
095–099	324	0.03%
100 plus	152	0.02%

== Politics ==
=== Election results ===
Election results for Ehlanzeni in the South African general election, 2004.

- Population 18 and over: 537 768 [56.93% of total population]
- Total votes: 333 737 [35.33% of total population]
- Voting % estimate: 62.06% votes as a % of population 18 and over

Party	Votes	%
African National Congress	298 810	89.53%
Democratic Alliance	20 523	6.15%
African Christian Democratic Party	3 087	0.92%
United Democratic Movement	3 006	0.90%
Freedom Front Plus	1 891	0.57%
Pan African Congress	1 460	0.44%
New National Party	1 216	0.36%
Independent Democrats	1 056	0.32%
Inkhata Freedom Party	1 038	0.31%
Azanian People's Organisation	348	0.10%
United Christian Democratic Party	282	0.08%
SOPA	172	0.05%
NA	136	0.04%
EMSA	130	0.04%
CDP	124	0.04%
PJC	118	0.04%
UF	118	0.04%
TOP	75	0.02%
KISS	62	0.02%
NLP	54	0.02%
Minority Front	31	0.01%
Total	333 737	100.00%
