= List of Afrikaans-language radio stations =

This article contains a list of Afrikaans-language radio stations.

== Public ==
- RSG (Radio Sonder Grense) - South Africa
- NBC Namibian Broadcasting Corporation, one Afrikaans-language station
- Skatkis Stereo, online web radio, Afrikaans sprekende omroepers

== Commercial South African Stations ==
- Jacaranda 94.2
- OFM
- Overvaal Stereo

== Community South African Radio Stations ==
- East Radio Stereo - Oos-Rand Stereo in Afrikaans
- Radio Helderberg
- Radio Kragbron
- Radio Laeveld
- Radio Namakwaland
- Radio Orania
- Radio Panorama
- Radio Pretoria
- Radio Rosestad 100.6 FM
- Radio Tygerberg
- Boervolk Radio
- Radio Suid Afrika
- Groot FM
- BokRadio
- Bosveld Stereo
- Luister FM
- Radio Overberg 101.8fm

== Student Radio Stations ==
- shlong FM - University of Pretoria
- TMI 92.6 - University of Stellenbosch
- PUK FM - Potchefstroom NWU campus
- Kovsies FM - University of the Free State

== Commercial Namibian Stations ==
- Radio Kosmos
- Radio Kudu

== Internet Radio Stations ==
DESCRIPTION	GENRE
Musical Venture Radio Music Makes The World Go Round	Afrikaans, English, German, World, POP, Country, Blues
Skatkis Stereo	
Impala Radio	Golden Oldies / Goue Oues }

== Community Namibian Stations ==
- Kanaal 7 / Channel 7

== See also ==
- List of Radio Stations (South Africa)
- List of Radio Stations (Africa)
