= Boers =

Descendants of Afrikaners beyond the Cape Colony frontier

Boere
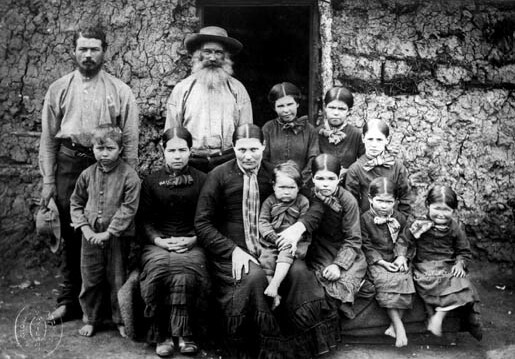
- Boer family in 1886

Total population
- c. 1.5 million

Languages
- Afrikaans

Religion
- Protestant Christianity

Related ethnic groups
- Other Afrikaners; Dutch; Flemish; French Huguenots; Germans; Cape Coloureds

Boers (/bʊərz/ BOORZ; Afrikaans: Boere; [ˈbuːrə]) are the descendants of the proto Afrikaans-speaking Free Burghers of the eastern Cape frontier in Southern Africa during the 17th, 18th, and 19th centuries. From 1652 to 1795, the Dutch East India Company controlled the Dutch Cape Colony, which the United Kingdom incorporated into the British Empire in 1806. The name of the group is derived from Trekbœr then later "boer", which means "farmer" in Dutch and Afrikaans.

In addition, the term Boeren also applied to those who left the Cape Colony during the 19th century to colonise the Orange Free State, and the Transvaal (together known as the Boer Republics), and to a lesser extent Natal. They emigrated from the Cape to live beyond the reach of the British colonial administration, with their reasons for doing so primarily being the new Anglophone common law system being introduced into the Cape and the British abolition of slavery in 1833.

The term Afrikaners or Afrikaans people is generally used in modern-day South Africa for the white Afrikaans-speaking population of South Africa (the largest group of White South Africans) encompassing the descendants of both the Boers, and the Cape Dutch who did not embark on the Great Trek.

According to a genetic study, 4.7% of their DNA is of non-European origin. 1.3% being Khoisan, 1.7% from South Asia, slightly less than 1% from East Asia and 0.8% from East and West Africa.

== Origin ==
=== European colonists ===
Flag of the Dutch East India Company

The Dutch East India Company (Dutch: Vereenigde Oostindische Compagnie; VOC) was formed in the Dutch Republic in 1602, and at this time the Dutch had entered the competition for the colonial and imperial trade of commerce in Southeast Asia. The end of the Thirty Years' War in 1648 saw European soldiers and refugees widely dispersed across Europe. Immigrants from Germany, Scandinavia, and Switzerland traveled to the Netherlands in the hope of finding employment with the VOC. During the same year, one of their ships was stranded in Table Bay near what would eventually become Cape Town, and the shipwrecked crew had to forage for themselves on shore for several months. They were so impressed with the natural resources of the country that on their return to the Dutch Republic, they presented to the VOC directors the advantages to be had for the Dutch Eastern trade from a properly provided for and fortified station at the Cape. In response, the VOC sent a Dutch expedition in 1652 led by Jan van Riebeek, who constructed a fort, laid out vegetable gardens at Table Bay, and took control over Cape Town, which he governed for a decade.

=== Free Burghers ===
VOC favored the idea of freemen at the Cape and many workers of VOC requested to be discharged in order to become free burghers. As a result, Jan van Riebeek approved the notion on favorable conditions and earmarked two areas near the Liesbeek River for the purpose of agricultural development in 1657. The two areas allocated to the freemen were named Greenfield and Dutch Garden. These areas were separated by the Amstel (Liesbeek) River. The best nine applicants were selected to settle the land. The freemen (free burghers, as they were called thereafter) thus became subjects of VOC and were no longer considered servants.

In 1671, the Dutch first purchased land from the indigenous Khoikhoi beyond the limits of the fort built by Van Riebeek; this marked the beginnings of the Dutch Cape Colony. As the result of the investigations of a 1685 commissioner, the government worked to recruit a greater variety of immigrants to develop a stable community. They formed part of the class of vrijlieden, also known as vrijburgers ('free citizens'), former VOC employees who remained at the Cape after serving their contracts. A large number of vrijburgers became independent farmers and applied for grants of land, as well as loans of seed and tools, from VOC administration.

=== Dutch free immigrants ===
VOC authorities had been endeavouring to induce gardeners and small farmers to emigrate from Europe to South Africa, but with little success. They were only able to attract a few families through the promise of wealth, but the Cape had little to offer. In October 1670, however, the Chamber of Amsterdam announced that a few families were willing to leave for the Cape and Mauritius the following December. Among the new names of burghers at this time were Jacob and Dirk van Niekerk, Johannes van As, Francois Villion, Jacob Brouwer, Jan van Eden, Hermanus Potgieter, Albertus Gildenhuis, and Jacobus van den Berg.

=== French Huguenots ===
During 1688–1689, the colony was greatly strengthened by the arrival of nearly two hundred French Huguenots, who were political refugees from the religious wars in France following the revocation of the Edict of Nantes. They joined colonies at Stellenbosch, Drakenstein, Franschhoek and Paarl. The Huguenots had a marked influence on the character of the colony, leading the VOC in 1701 to mandate that only Dutch be taught in schools. This resulted in the Huguenots assimilating by the middle of the 18th century, with a loss in the use and knowledge of French. The colony gradually spread eastwards, and by 1754 land as far as Algoa Bay was included in the colony.

At this time the European colonists numbered eight to ten thousand. They possessed numerous slaves, grew wheat in sufficient quantity to make it a commodity crop for export, and were famed for the good quality of their wines. But their chief wealth was in cattle. They enjoyed considerable prosperity.

Through the latter half of the 17th and the whole of the 18th century, troubles arose between the colonists and the government as the VOC administration was despotic. Its policies were not directed at development of the colony, but to profit the VOC. The VOC closed the colony against free immigration, kept the whole of the trade in its own hands, combined the administrative, legislative and judicial powers into one body, mandated the cultivation of certain crops, and demanded a large part of their produce as a kind of tax, among other exactions.

=== Trekboers ===
From time to time, indentured VOC servants were endowed with the right of freeburghers but the VOC retained the power to compel them to return into its service whenever they deemed it necessary. This right to force into servitude those who might incur the displeasure of the governor or other high officers was not only exercised with reference to the individuals themselves; it was claimed by the government to be applicable to their children as well.

The tyranny caused many to feel desperate and to flee from oppression, even before the 1700 trekking began. In 1780, Joachim van Plettenberg, the governor, proclaimed the Sneeuberge to be the northern boundary of the colony, expressing "the anxious hope that no more extension should take place, and with heavy penalties forbidding the rambling peasants to wander beyond". In 1789, so strong had feelings amongst the burghers become that delegates were sent from the Cape to interview the authorities at Amsterdam. After this deputation, some nominal reforms were granted.

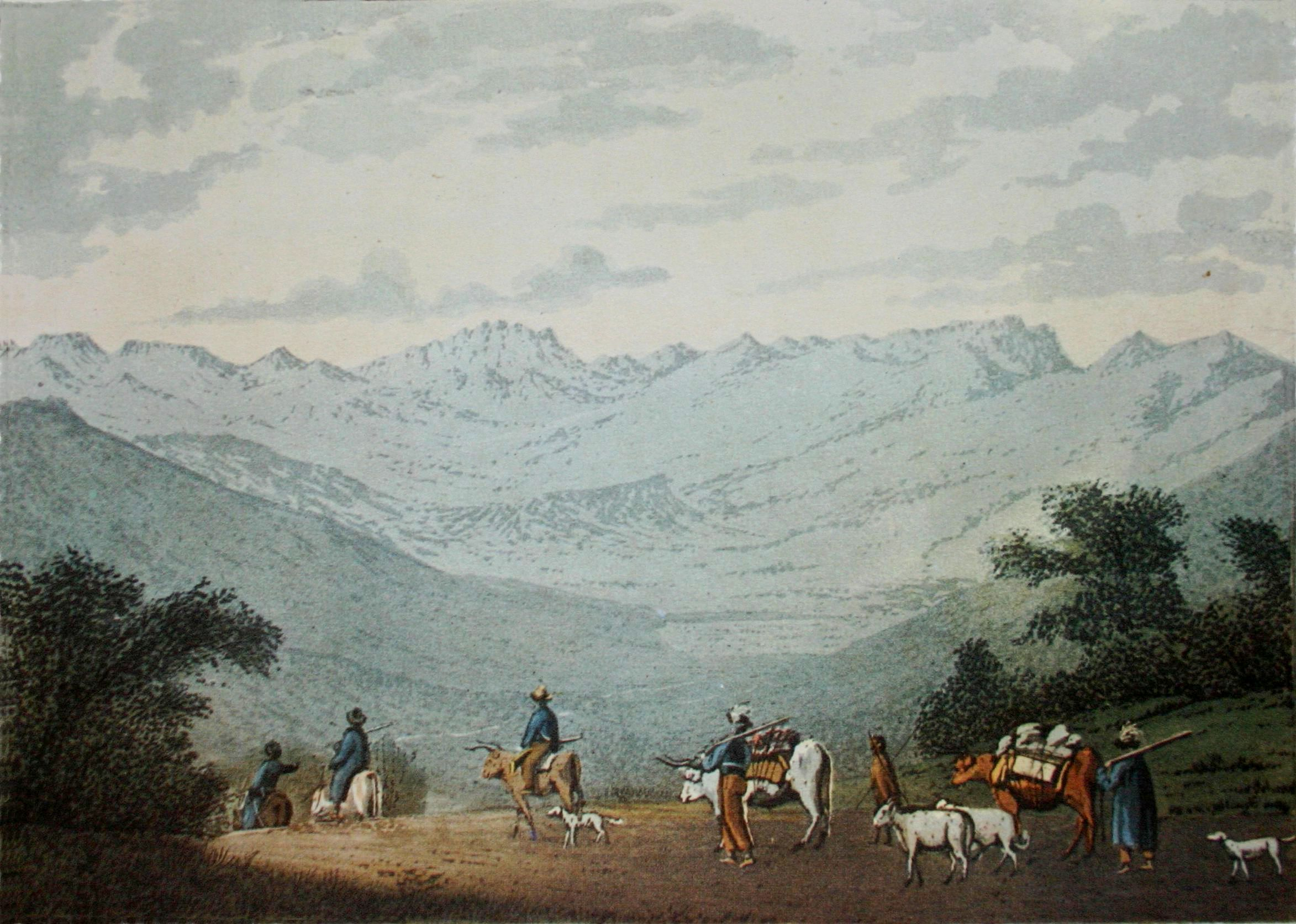
Descending from the Sneeuberge, a scene near Graaff-Reinet, by Burchell

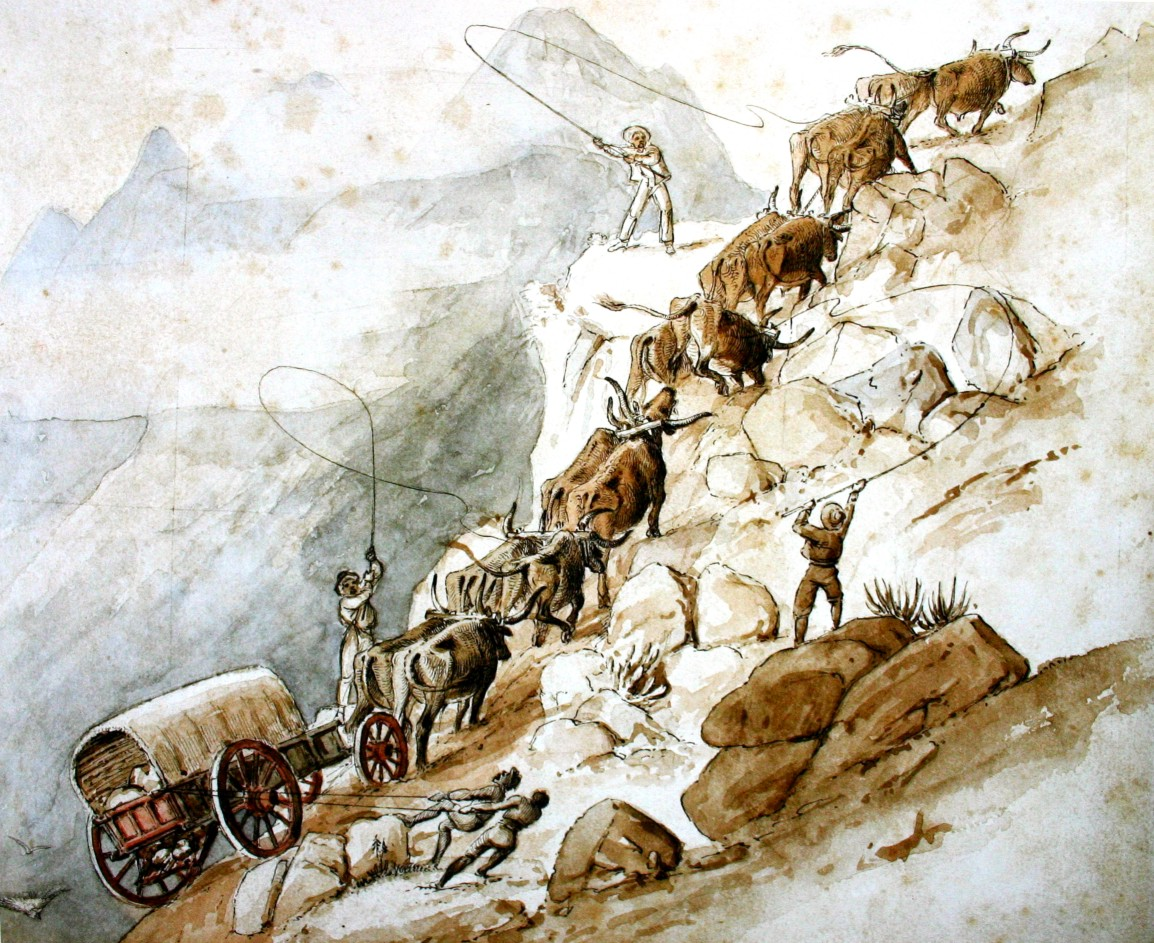
Passing Cradock Pass, Outeniqua Mountains, by Charles Collier Michell

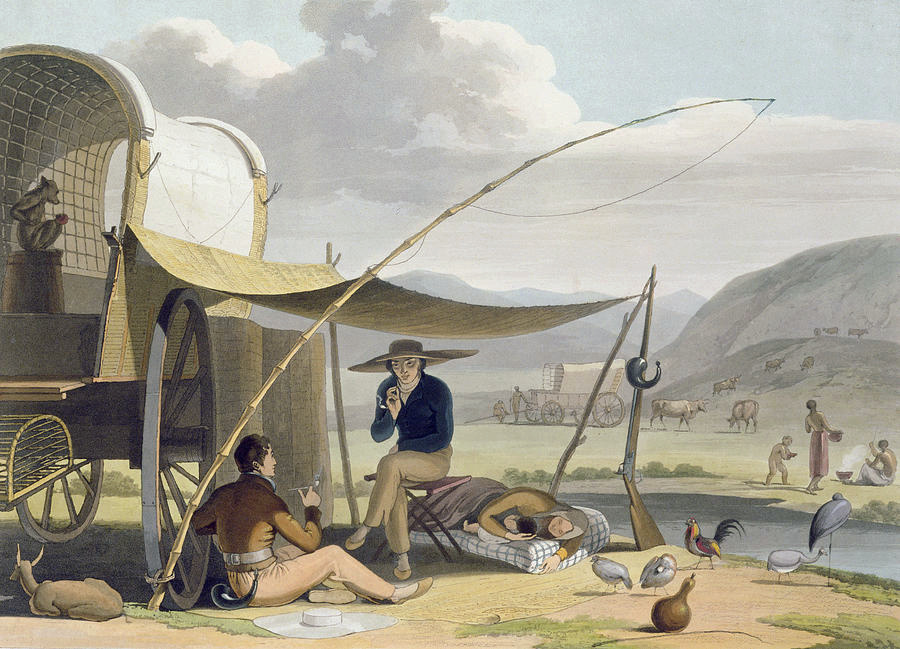
An aquatint by Samuel Daniell of Trekboers making camp

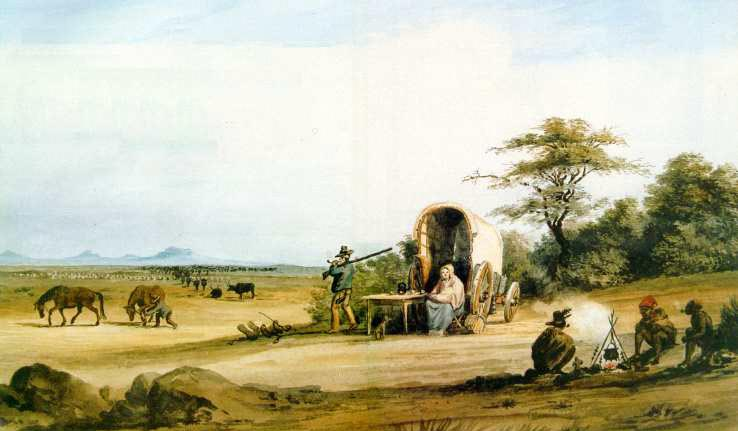
Trekboers crossing the Karoo by Charles Davidson Bell

It was largely to escape oppression that the farmers trekked farther and farther from the seat of government. VOC, to control the emigrants, established a magistracy at Swellendam in 1745 and another at Graaff Reinet in 1786. The Gamtoos River had been declared, c. 1740, the eastern frontier of the colony but it was soon passed. In 1780, however, the Dutch, to avoid collision with the Bantu peoples, agreed with them to make the Great Fish River the common boundary. In 1795 the heavily taxed burghers of the frontier districts, who were afforded no protection against the Bantus, expelled the VOC officials, and set up independent governments at Swellendam and Graaff Reinet.

The trekboers of the 19th century were the lineal descendants of the trekboers of the 18th century. The end of the 19th century saw a revival of the same tyrannical monopolist policy as that in the VOC government in the Transvaal. If the formula, "In all things political, purely despotic; in all things commercial, purely monopolist", was true of the VOC government in the 18th century, it was equally true of Kruger's government in the latter part of the 19th.

The underlying fact which made the trek possible is that the Dutch-descended colonists in the eastern and northeastern parts of the colony were not cultivators of the soil, but of purely pastoral and nomadic habits, ever ready to seek new pastures for their flocks and herds, possessing no special affection for any particular locality. These people, thinly scattered over a wide territory, had lived for so long with little restraint from the law that when, in 1815, by the institution of "Commissions of Circuit", justice was brought nearer to their homes, various offences were brought to light, the remedying of which caused much resentment.

The Dutch-descended colonists in the eastern and northeastern parts of the colony, as a result of the Great Trek, had removed themselves from governmental rule and become widely spread out. However, the institution of "Commissions of Circuit" in 1815 allowed the prosecution of crimes, with offences committed by the trekboers—notably including many against people they had enslaved—seeing justice. These prosecutions were very unpopular amongst the trekkers and were seen as interfering with their rights over the enslaved people they viewed as their property.

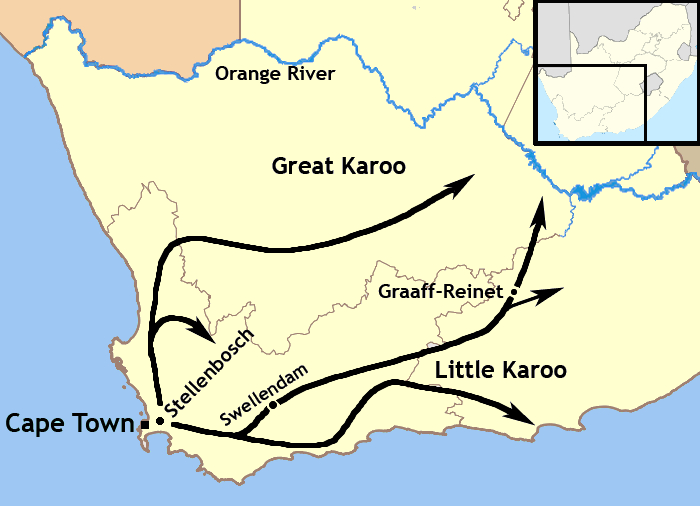
A map of the expansion of the Trekboers (1700–1800)

Evolution of the Dutch Cape Colony (1700–1800)

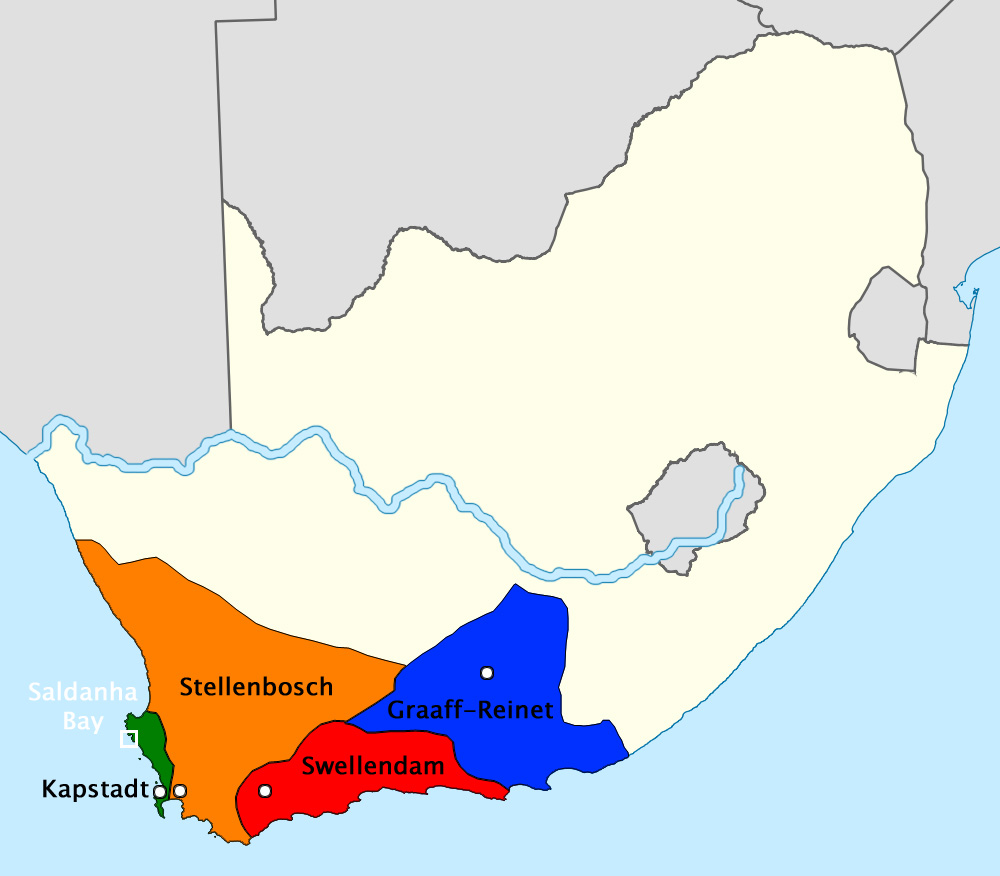
Administrative divisions of the Dutch Cape Colony

== Invasion of the Cape Colony ==
The Invasion of the Cape Colony was a British military expedition launched in 1795 against the Dutch Cape Colony at the Cape of Good Hope. The Netherlands had fallen under the revolutionary government of France and a British force under General Sir James Henry Craig was sent to Cape Town to secure the colony from the French for the Prince of Orange, a refugee in England. The governor of Cape Town at first refused to obey the instructions from the Prince, but when the British proceeded to land troops to take possession anyway, he capitulated. His action was hastened by the fact that the Khoikhoi, escaping from their former enslavers, flocked to the British standard. The burghers of Graaff Reinet did not surrender until a force had been sent against them; in 1799 and again in 1801 they rose in revolt. In February 1803, as a result of the peace of Amiens (February 1803), the colony was handed over to the Batavian Republic which introduced many reforms, as had the British during their eight years' rule. One of the first acts of General Craig had been to abolish torture in the administration of justice. The country still remained essentially Dutch, and few British citizens were attracted to it. Its cost to the British exchequer during this period was £16,000,000. The Batavian Republic entertained very liberal views as to the administration of the country, but had little opportunity to enact them.

When the War of the Third Coalition broke out in 1803, a British force was once again sent to the Cape. After an engagement (January 1806) on the shores of Table Bay, the Dutch garrison of Castle of Good Hope surrendered to the British under Sir David Baird, and in the 1814 Anglo-Dutch treaty the colony was ceded outright by The Netherlands to the British crown. At that time the colony extended to the line of mountains guarding the vast central plateau, then called Bushmansland (after a name for the San people), and had an area of about 120000 sq km and a population of some 60000, of whom 27000 were whites, 17000 free Khoikhoi and the rest enslaved people, mostly non-indigenous blacks and Malays.

=== Dislike of British rule ===
Although the colony was fairly prosperous, many of the Dutch farmers were as dissatisfied with British rule as they had been with that of the VOC, though their grounds for complaint were not the same. In 1792, Moravian missions had been established which targeted the Khoikhoi. In 1799 the London Missionary Society began work among both Khoikhoi and the Bantu peoples. As a result of the VOC turning the opportunity to restoke their vessels into a 3–4 week stay increasing the aller-retour time by 2 months and 16% of all time calculated. In 1812 British colonial lord signed an ordinance was issued which empowered magistrates to bind Khoikhoi children as apprentices under conditions which differed little from slavery. Simultaneously, the movement for the abolition of slavery was gaining strength in England but did not get passed and resolved until 25 years after this ordinance.

=== Slachter's Nek ===
A farmer named Frederick Bezuidenhout refused to obey a summons issued on the complaint of a Khoikhoi, and, firing on the party sent to arrest him, was killed by the return fire. This caused a small rebellion in 1815, known as Slachters Nek, described as "the most insane attempt ever made by a set of men to wage war against their sovereign" by Henry Cloete. Upon its suppression, five ringleaders were publicly hanged at the spot where they had sworn to expel "the English tyrants". The feeling caused by the hanging of these men was deepened by the circumstances of the execution, as the scaffold on which the rebels were simultaneously hanged broke down from their united weight and the men were afterwards hanged one by one. An ordinance was passed in 1827, abolishing the old Dutch courts of landdrost and heemraden (resident magistrates being substituted) and establishing that henceforth all legal proceedings should be conducted in English. The granting in 1828, as a result of the representations of the missionaries, of equal rights with whites to the Khoikhoi and other free coloured people, the imposition (1830) of heavy penalties for harsh treatment of enslaved people, and finally the emancipation of the enslaved people in 1834, were measures which combined to aggravate the farmers' dislike of government. Moreover, what the Boers viewed as the inadequate compensation for the freeing of the slaves, and the suspicions engendered by the method of payment, caused much resentment; and in 1835 the farmers again removed themselves to unknown country to escape the government. While emigration beyond the colonial border had been continuous for 150 years, it now took on larger proportions.

== Cape Frontier Wars (1779–1879) ==
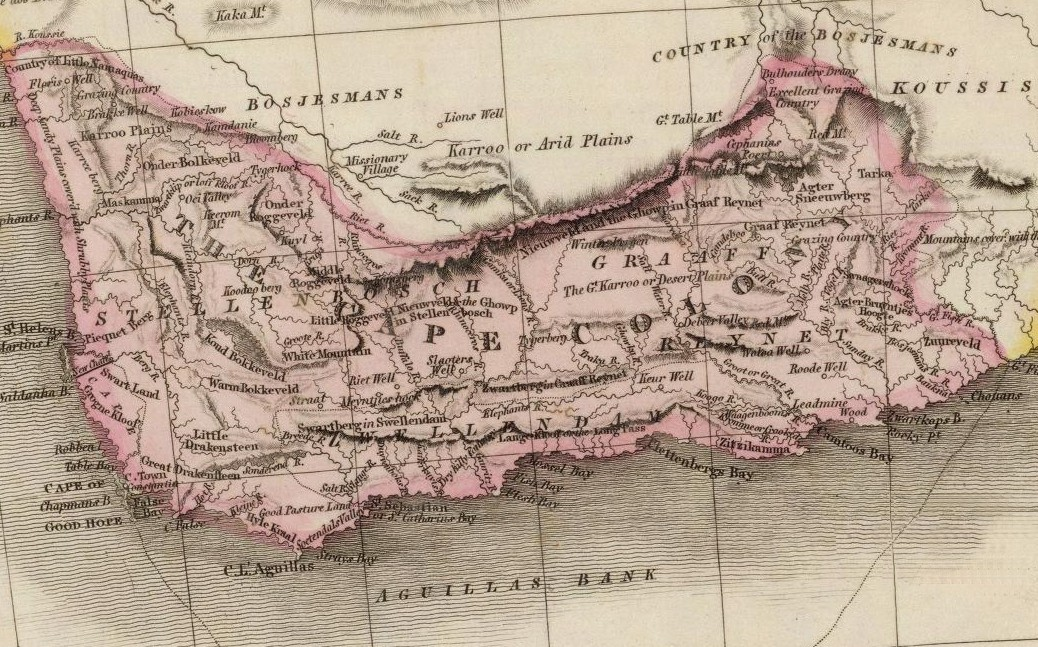
Map of the Cape Colony in 1809, early British rule

The migration of the trekboers from the Cape Colony into the Eastern Cape parts of South Africa, where the native Xhosa people had established settlements, gave rise to a series of conflicts between the Boers and the Xhosas. In 1775 the Cape government established a boundary between the trekboers and the Xhosas at the Bushmans and Upper Fish Rivers. The Boers and Xhosas ignored the boundary, with both groups establishing homes on either side of the frontier. Governor van Plettenberg attempted to persuade both groups to respect the boundary line without success. The Xhosas were accused of stealing cattle and in 1779 a series of skirmishes erupted along the border which initiated the 1st Frontier War.

The frontier remained unstable, resulting in the outbreak of the 2nd Frontier War in 1789. Raids carried out by Boers and Xhosas on both sides of the boundary caused much friction in the area which resulted in several groups being drawn into the conflict. In 1795, the British invasion of the Cape Colony resulted in a change of government. After the government takeover the British began to draw up policies with regards to the frontier resulting in a Boer rebellion in Graaff-Reinet. The policies caused the Khoisan tribes to join some Xhosa chiefs in attacks against British forces during the 3rd Frontier War (1799–1803).

Peace was restored to the area when the British, under the Treaty of Amiens, returned the Cape Colony to the Dutch Batavian Republic in 1803. In January 1806 during a second invasion, the British reoccupied the colony after the Battle of Blaauwberg. Tensions in the Zuurveld led the colonial administration and Boer colonists to expel many of the Xhosa tribes from the area, initiating the 4th Frontier War in 1811. Conflicts between the Xhosas on the frontier led to the 5th Frontier War in 1819.

The Xhosas, due to dissatisfaction with vacillating government policies regarding where they were permitted to live, undertook large-scale cattle thefts on the frontier. The Cape government responded with several military expeditions. In 1834 a large Xhosa force moved into the Cape territory, which began the 6th Frontier War. Additional fortifications were built by the government and mounted patrols were not well received by the Xhosas, who continued with raids on farms during the 7th Frontier War (1846–1847). The 8th (1850–1853) and 9th Frontier Wars (1877–1878) continued at the same pace as their predecessors. Eventually the Xhosas were defeated and the territories were brought under British control.

== Great Trek ==
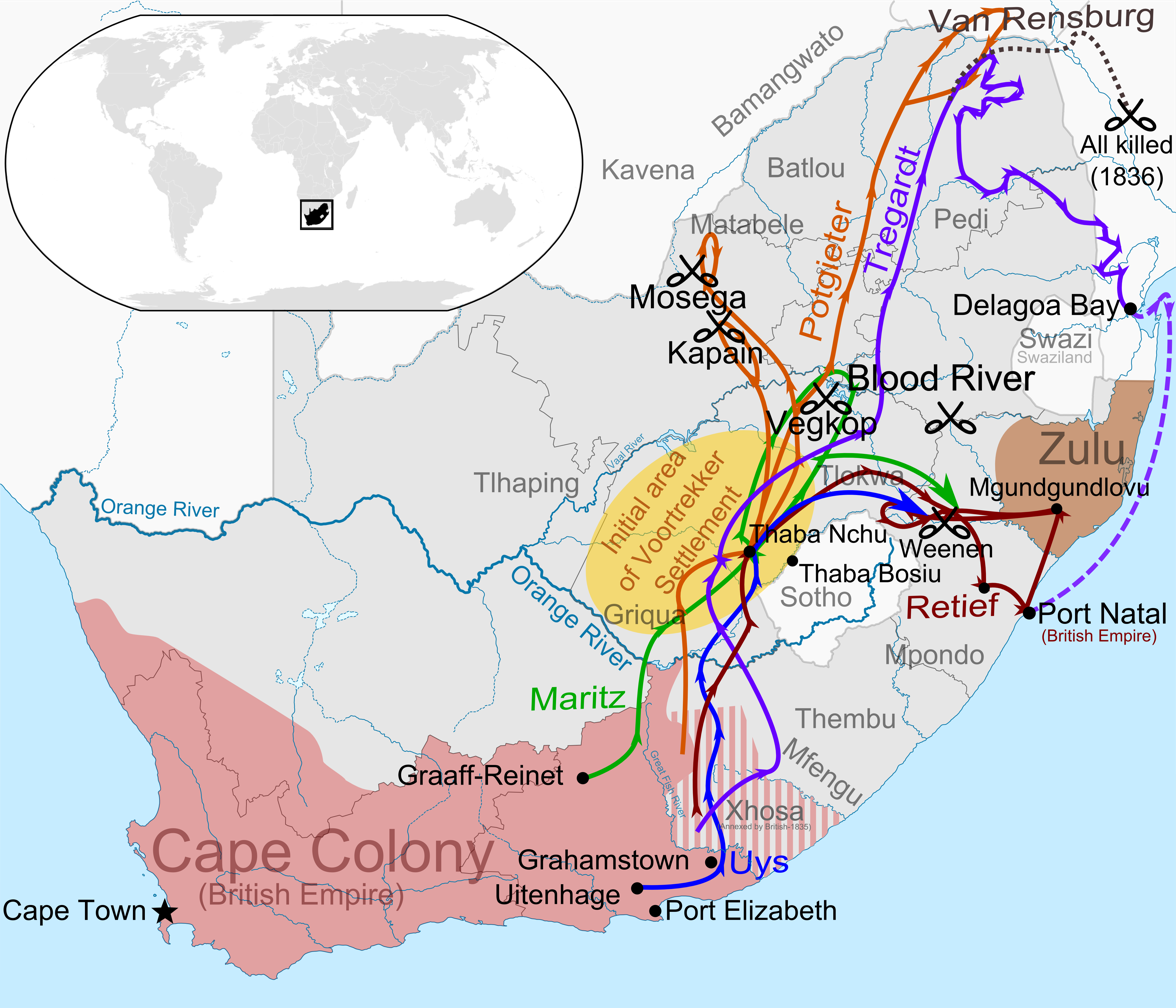
A map charting the routes of the largest trekking parties during the first wave of the Great Trek (1835–1840) along with key battles and events.

The Great Trek occurred between 1835 and the early 1840s. During that period some 12,000 to 14,000 Boers (including women and children), impatient with British rule, emigrated from Cape Colony into the great plains beyond the Orange River, and across them again into Natal and the vastness of the Zoutspansberg, in the northern part of the Transvaal. Those Trekboers who occupied the eastern Cape were semi-nomadic. A significant number in the eastern Cape frontier later became Grensboere ('border farmers') who were the direct ancestors of the Voortrekkers.

The Boers addressed several correspondence to the British Colonial Government before leaving the Cape Colony as reasons for their departure. Piet Retief, one of the leaders of the Boers during the time, addressed a letter to the government on 22 January 1837 in Grahamstown stating that the Boers did not see any prospect for peace or happiness for their children in a country with such internal commotions. Retief further complained that the severe financial losses had resulted from the emancipation of their enslaved people, for which the Boers considered the compensation provided by the British government to be inadequate. They also felt that the English church system was incompatible with the Dutch Reformed Church. By this time the Boers had already formed a separate code of laws in preparation for the great trek and were aware of the dangerous territory they were about to enter. Retief concluded his letter with "We quit this colony under the full assurance that the English Government has nothing more to require of us, and will allow us to govern ourselves without its interference in future".

== Boer states and republics ==
Boer and Griqua Republics

As the Voortrekkers progressed further inland, they continued to establish Boer colonies on the interior of South Africa.

Description	Dates	Area
Republic of Swellendam	17 June – 4 November 1795	Swellendam, Western Cape
Republic of Graaff-Reinet	1 February 1795 – November 1796	Graaff-Reinet, Eastern Cape
Zoutpansberg	1835–1864	Limpopo
Winburg	1836–1844	Free State
Potchefstroom	1837–1844	North West
Natalia Republic	1839–1902	Eastern Cape
Winburg-Potchefstroom	1844–1843	Potchefstroom, North West
Republic of Klip River	1847–1848	Ladysmith, KwaZulu-Natal
Lydenburg Republic	1849–1860	Lydenburg, Mpumalanga
Utrecht Republic	1852–1858	Utrecht, KwaZulu-Natal
South African Republic	1852–1877, 1881–1902	Gauteng, Limpopo
Orange Free State	1854–1902	Free State
Klein Vrystaat	1876–1891	Piet Retief, Mpumalanga
State of Goshen	1882–1883	North West
Republic of Stellaland	1882–1883	North West
United States of Stellaland	1883–1885	North West
New Republic	1884–1888	Vryheid, KwaZulu-Natal
Republic of Upingtonia/Lijdensrust	1885–1887	Namibia

== Anglo-Boer wars ==
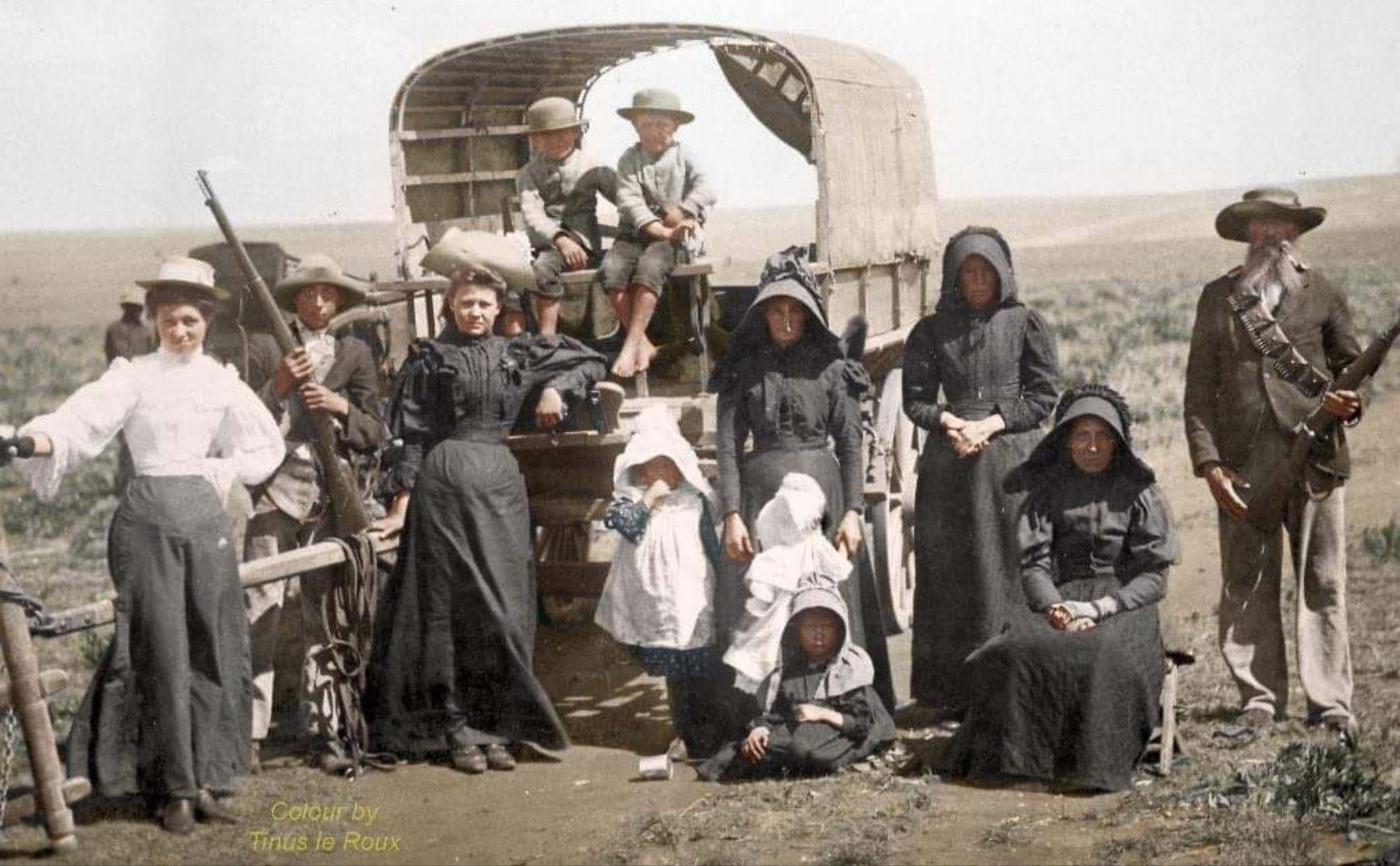
Boer family traveling by covered wagon circa 1900

Following the British annexation of the Transvaal in 1877, Paul Kruger was a key figure in organizing a Boer resistance which led to expulsion of the British from the Transvaal. The Boers then fought the Second Boer War in the late 19th and early 20th century against the British in order to ensure the republics of the Transvaal (the Zuid-Afrikaansche Republiek) and the Orange Free State remained independent but ultimately capitulated in 1902.

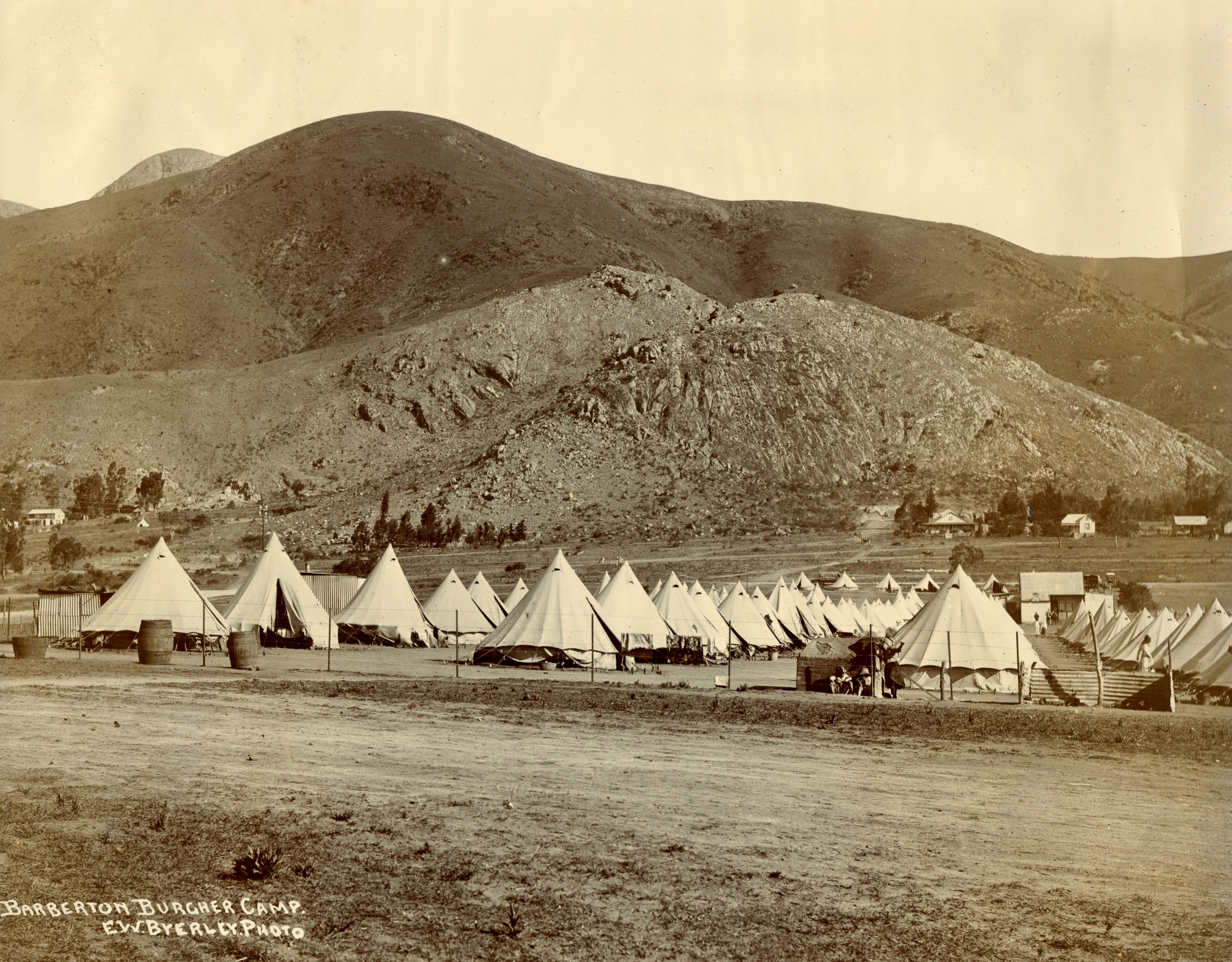
Tents in the British concentration camp of Barberton, c.1901

During the first Boer war, a Welsh clergyman, Rev. Owen Watkins lived in Transvaal for 13 years, and during his time he described how the Boers (people) were against the abolition of slavery and disliked the term 'slavery', that they preferred to use the term 'apprentices'. He described that the Boers 'looked upon the 'Kaffirs' as the cursed of God' and that 'the real cause of the hatred of the British by the Boers was the black man'.

=== Boer War diaspora ===
After the Second Boer War, a Boer diaspora occurred. Starting in 1903, the largest group emigrated to the Patagonia region of Argentina and to Brazil. Another group emigrated to the British colony of Kenya, from where most returned to South Africa during the 1930s, while a third group under the leadership of General Ben Viljoen emigrated to Mexico and to New Mexico and Texas in the southwestern United States.

== 1914 Boer Revolt ==
The Maritz Rebellion (also known as the Boer Revolt, the Five Shilling Rebellion or the Third Boer War) occurred in 1914 at the start of World War I, in which men who supported the re-creation of the Boer republics rose up against the government of the Union of South Africa because they did not want to side with the British against the German Empire so soon after the war with the British.

Many Boers had German ancestry and many members of the government were themselves former Boer military leaders who had fought with the Maritz rebels against the British in the Second Boer War. The rebellion was put down by Louis Botha and Jan Smuts, and the ringleaders received heavy fines and terms of imprisonment. One, Jopie Fourie, an officer in the Union Defence Force, was convicted for treason when he refused to take up arms alongside the British, and was executed by the South African government in 1914.

== Characteristics ==
=== Language ===
Afrikaans is a West Germanic language spoken widely in South Africa and Namibia, and to a lesser extent in Botswana and Zimbabwe. It evolved from the Dutch vernacular of South Holland (Hollandic dialect) spoken by the mainly Dutch colonists of what is now South Africa, where it gradually began to develop distinguishing characteristics in the course of the 18th century. Hence, it is a daughter language of Dutch, and was previously referred to as Cape Dutch (also used to refer collectively to the early Cape colonists) or kitchen Dutch (a derogatory term used in its earlier days). However, it is also variously (although incorrectly) described as a creole or as a partially creolised language. (Note: Afrikaans is a daughter language of Dutch; see Booij 1999, p. 2, Jansen, Schreuder & Neijt 2007, p. 5, Mennen, Levelt & Gerrits 2006, p. 1, Booij 2003, p. 4, Hiskens, Auer & Kerswill 2005, p. 19, Heeringa & de Wet 2007, pp. 1, 3, 5. Afrikaans was historically called Cape Dutch; see Deumert & Vandenbussche 2003, p. 16, Conradie 2005, p. 208, Sebba 1997, p. 160, Langer & Davies 2005, p. 144, Deumert 2002, p. 3, Berdichevsky 2004, p. 130. Afrikaans is rooted in seventeenth century dialects of Dutch; see Holm 1989, p. 338, Geerts & Clyne 1992, p. 71, Mesthrie 1995, p. 214, Niesler, Louw & Roux 2005, p. 459. Afrikaans is variously described as a creole, a partially creolised language, or a deviant variety of Dutch; see Sebba 2007, p. 116.) The term is ultimately derived from Dutch Afrikaans-Hollands meaning African Dutch.

=== Culture ===
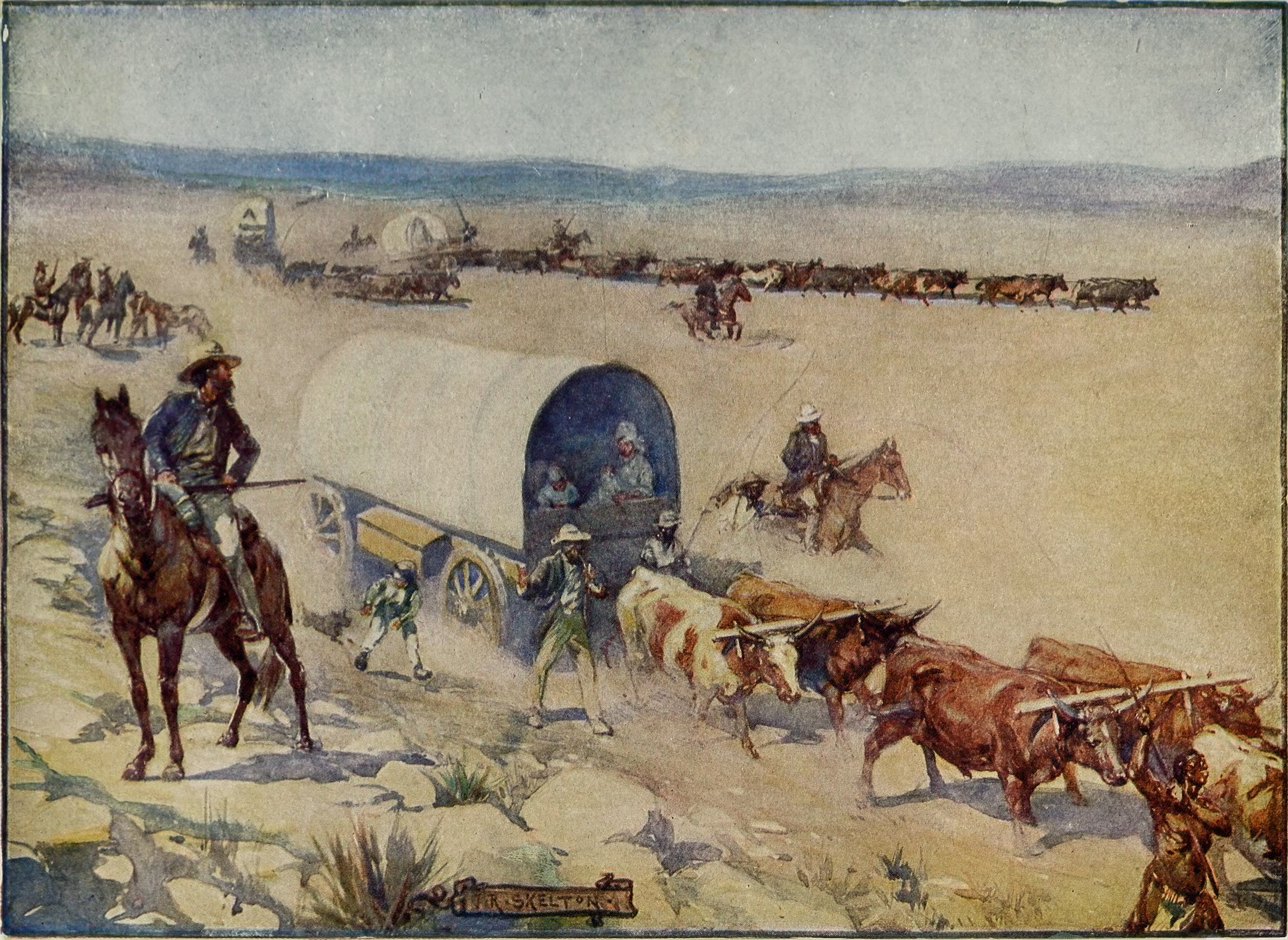
Painting depicting the Bullock wagons moving over the billowy plains, 2 January 1860

The desire to wander, known as trekgees, was a notable characteristic of the Boers. It figured prominently in the late 17th century when the Trekboers began to inhabit the northern and eastern Cape frontiers, again during the Great Trek when the Voortrekkers left the eastern Cape en masse, and after the major republics were established during the Thirstland ('Dorsland') Trek. One such trekker described the impetus for emigrating as, "a drifting spirit was in our hearts, and we ourselves could not understand it. We just sold our farms and set out northwestwards to find a new home". A rustic characteristic and tradition was developed quite early on as Boer society was born on the frontiers of white colonisation and on the outskirts of Western civilisation.

The Boer quest for independence manifested in a tradition of declaring republics, which predates the arrival of the British; when the British arrived, Boer republics had already been declared and were in rebellion from the VOC.

=== Beliefs ===
The Boers of the frontier were known for their independent spirit, resourcefulness, hardiness, and self-sufficiency, whose political notions verged on anarchy but had begun to be influenced by republicanism.

The Boers had cut their ties to Europe as they emerged from the Trekboer group.

The Boers possessed a distinct Protestant culture, and the majority of Boers and their descendants were members of a Reformed Church. The Nederduitsch Hervormde Kerk ('Dutch Reformed Church') was the national Church of the South African Republic (1852–1902). The Orange Free State (1854–1902) was named after the Protestant House of Orange in the Netherlands.

The Calvinist influence, in such fundamental Calvinist doctrines such as unconditional predestination and divine providence, remains present in a minority of Boer culture, who see their role in society as abiding by the national laws and accepting calamity and hardship as part of their Christian duty. Many Boers have since converted to other denominations and are now members of Baptist, Charismatic, Pentecostal or Lutheran Churches.

== Modern usage ==
During recent times, mainly during the apartheid reform and post-1994 eras, some white Afrikaans-speaking people, mainly with conservative political views, and of Trekboer and Voortrekker descent, have chosen to be called Boere, rather than Afrikaners, to distinguish their identity. They believe that many people of Voortrekker descent were not assimilated into what they see as the Cape-based Afrikaner identity. They suggest that this developed after the Second Anglo-Boer War and the subsequent establishment of the Union of South Africa in 1910. Some Boer nationalists have asserted that they do not identify as a right-wing element of the political spectrum.

They contend that the Boers of the South African Republic and Orange Free State republics were recognised as a separate people or cultural group under international law by the Sand River Convention (which created the South African Republic in 1852), the Bloemfontein Convention (which created the Orange Free State Republic in 1854), the Pretoria Convention (which re-established the independence of the South African Republic 1881), the London Convention (which granted the full independence to the South African Republic in 1884), and the Vereeniging Peace Treaty, which formally ended the Second Anglo-Boer War on 31 May 1902. Others contend, however, that these treaties dealt only with agreements between governmental entities and do not imply the recognition of a Boer cultural identity per se.

The supporters of these views feel that the Afrikaner label was used from the 1930s onwards as a means of politically unifying the white Afrikaans speakers of the Western Cape with those of Trekboer and Voortrekker descent in the north of South Africa, where the Boer Republics were established.

Since the Anglo-Boer war, the term Boerevolk ('farmer people') was rarely used in the 20th century by the various regimes because of the effort to assimilate the Boerevolk with the Afrikaners. A portion of those who are the descendants of the Boerevolk have reasserted use of this designation.

The supporters of the Boer designation view the term Afrikaner as an artificial political label which usurped their history and culture, turning Boer achievements into Afrikaner achievements. They feel that the Western-Cape based Afrikaners – whose ancestors did not trek eastwards or northwards – took advantage of the republican Boers' destitution following the Anglo-Boer War. At that time, the Afrikaners attempted to assimilate the Boers into the new politically based cultural label.

In contemporary South Africa, Boer and Afrikaner have often been used interchangeably. Afrikaner directly translated means African, and thus refers to all Afrikaans-speaking people in Africa who have their origins in the Cape Colony founded by Jan Van Riebeeck. Boer is a specific group within the larger Afrikaans-speaking population.

During apartheid, Boer was used by opponents of apartheid in various contexts, referring to institutional structures such as the National Party, or to specific groups of people, such as members of the Police Force (colloquially known as Boere) and Army, Afrikaners, or white South Africans generally. This usage is often viewed as pejorative in contemporary South Africa.

=== Politics ===
- Boere-Vryheidsbeweging
- Boerestaat Party
- Freedom Front Plus
- Front National
- Herstigte Nasionale Party
- National Conservative Party of South Africa

=== Education ===
The Movement for Christian-National Education is a federation of 47 Calvinist private schools, primarily in the Free State and the Transvaal, committed to educating Boer children from grade 0 through to 12.

=== Media ===
Some local radio stations promote the ideals of those who identify with the Boer people, like Radio Rosestad 100.6 FM (in Bloemfontein), Overvaal Stereo and Radio Pretoria. An internet-based radio station, Boervolk Radio, promotes Boer separatism.

=== Territories ===
Territorial areas in the form of a Boerestaat ('Boer State') are being developed a nation exclusively for both Boers and Afrikaners, notably Orania in the Northern Cape and Kleinfontein near Pretoria.

== Notable Boers ==
Voortrekker leaders

- Sarel Cilliers
- Andries Hendrik Potgieter
- Andries Pretorius
- Piet Retief

Great trek

- Racheltjie de Beer
- Dirkie Uys
- Marthinus Jacobus Oosthuizen

Participants in the Second Anglo-Boer War

- Koos de la Rey, general; regarded as being one of the great military leaders of the Second Anglo-Boer War
- Danie Theron, soldier
- Christiaan Rudolf de Wet, general
- Siener van Rensburg, considered a prophet by some

Politicians

- Louis Botha, first prime minister of South Africa (1910–1919) and former Boer general
- Petrus Jacobus Joubert, general and cabinet member of the Transvaal Republic
- Paul Kruger, president of the Transvaal Republic
- Martinus Theunis Steyn, 6th State President of the Orange Free State

Spies

- Robey Leibbrandt
- Fritz Joubert Duquesne, Boer captain known as the Black Panther who served in the Second Boer War

== Discrimination ==
South African farmers in rural areas, including many Boers, have faced violent attacks, including assault, murder, rape, and robbery. These incidents have led some White farmers and right-wing groups to claim that they are deliberately targeted due to their race. However, there are no reliable figures that suggest a higher risk of being murdered for White farmers.

The controversial song "Dubul' ibhunu" (translated as "shoot/kill the Boer", or "kill the farmer") has been sung among others by Julius Malema and his supporters during a political rally for the far-left political party Economic Freedom Fighters. Interpretations of the lyrics vary, with right-wing commentators claiming that they constitute a call for violence against white people, but historians as well as Malema himself pointing towards the origins of the song as an anti-apartheid chant that is not meant to be taken literally.

== In modern fiction ==
The history of the Cape Colony and the Boers in South Africa is covered at length in the 1980 novel The Covenant by American author James A. Michener.

The Boers appear as a civilization in the 'Scramble for Africa' scenario in Civilization V: Brave New World. Paul Kruger leads the civilization during the scenario. The Boers' unique unit is the foreign volunteer.

== See also ==
- Boerboel
- Boerehaat
- Dubul' ibhunu, shoot the Boer, kill the Boer, South African song
- Boer goat
- Boer music
- Settler colonialism
- South African farm attacks
- Transvaal civil war
- Transvaal Colony
