= Isobel Yeung =

British documentary correspondent (born 1986)

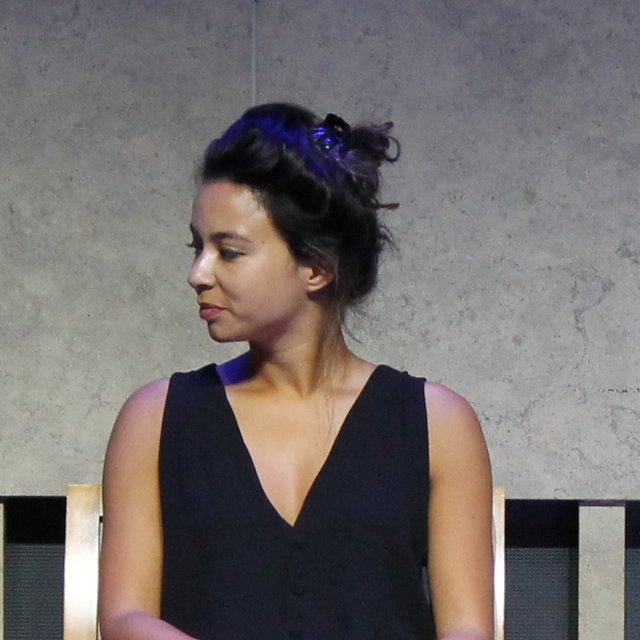
- Yeung in 2007
- Born: November 2, 1986 (age 40); Salisbury, England
- Education: University of Nottingham
- Occupation: Journalist
- Years active: 2014–present
- Employer(s): VICE News (until February 2024); CNN (since May 2024)
- Partner: Benjamin Zand (2017–present)
- Children: 1

Isobel Yeung (born 1986) is a British long-form documentary senior correspondent. She has covered a variety of stories concerning major global issues such as ongoing world conflicts, terrorism, mass detention, and genocide. She has also reported on social issues in developing countries such as gender roles, women's rights (e.g. in Afghanistan), mental health and corruption. Her work has earned her two Emmy Awards and a Gracie Award.

== Early life and education ==
Yeung was born in 1986 in Salisbury, England, to an English mother and a Chinese father from Hong Kong. She has a sister and a brother. She was raised and spent most of her early life in Salisbury.

== Career ==
After secondary school, Yeung spent a year abroad in Asia, funding her travels through modelling for fashion brands and as editor for lifestyle publications. Yeung graduated the University of Nottingham in 2009, having studied at both the UK and China campuses. Then she moved to China and freelanced for a number of print publications and TV channels, including International Channel Shanghai, and China Central Television.

As Yeung describes in interview, she pitched a documentary idea on the Hong Kong protests to Vice News in 2014 that resulted in her relocation to New York City to do such work full time; she proceeded to do so as a new employee of Vice. There, she was predominantly an on-air senior correspondent and producer for their flagship shows airing on HBO, specializing in long-form content and interviews. She is well-known for covering stories of human and political interest in areas of breaking and continuing international news (see examples and citations following), and on gender discrimination and sexual consent.

In May 2024, CNN announced that Yeung would join them as an international correspondent in the network’s London bureau.

=== Investigative reporting ===
==== In Afghanistan ====
In 2022, Yeung reported on the state of law and justice in Afghanistan following the 2021 Taliban takeover, the situation of women's rights under the governance of the Taliban, and the ongoing humanitarian crisis in the country stemming from a shortage of food and medical supplies and its collapsed economy.

==== In China ====
In 2019, Yeung went undercover in Xinjiang, China, to investigate the re-education camps for Uyghurs and other ethnic minorities in the Muslim-majority region, reporting on their mass detention, familial separation, and surveillance at the hands of Chinese authorities. Numerous times during her reporting, Yeung was followed, accosted, and had her camera footage deleted by Chinese police and security forces.

==== In Russia ====
In late April and early May 2023, Yeung travelled to Moscow to interview Presidential Commissioner for Children's Rights Maria Lvova-Belova, who is wanted by the International Criminal Court for unlawful deportation of children from Ukraine to Russia during Russia's invasion of Ukraine. In the interview, Lvova-Belova refuted claims that Russia forcibly deported Ukrainian children and subjected them to propaganda, saying that the children involved and their parents were Russian-speaking and wanted to be part of Russia. She also said that what Russia had done was purely out of compassion for the children and no politics or propaganda was involved, with the Ukrainian children brought into Russia reciprocating with gratitude for Russian soldiers who brought them to safety. The interview was criticized by Mykhailo Podolyak, adviser to the head of Office of the President of Ukraine, who described Lvova-Belova's remarks as "cannibalism" and that Russia is a "perfect model of hell".

==== In Ukraine ====
Yeung attended a 2018 Ukrainian presidential ceremony featuring President Petro Poroshenko that marked the Ukrainian Orthodox Church's split from the Russian Orthodox Church for the first time in 300 years. During her visit, she interviewed Ukrainian Crimeans who reported nine months of detention and torture by FSB officers for resisting the Russian occupation, the information blackout on the peninsula by Russian authorities, and the opening of the Kerch Strait Bridge.

During the 2022 Russian invasion of Ukraine, Yeung travelled to the southern Ukrainian city of Mykolaiv, between the strategic coastal cities of Kherson and Odesa during the Battle of Mykolaiv. While touring the damaged city with Mayor Oleksandr Syenkevych, Yeung met with family of soldiers and civilians killed in Russian bombings of the city and filmed remnants of apparent cluster munitions. In meeting with 25 year-old Mykolaiv resident Olya, Yeung interviews both Olya and her aunt Svetlana who resides in Russia about the ongoing war. While speaking with Yeung, Svetlana describes the war's filtered coverage in Russia and how Ukrainians aren't seeing how "the Nazis torture people [in Ukraine]" and how "the Russian forces are liberating Ukraine from Nazis." Yeung also toured the trenches of the Ukrainian 79th Brigade to the east of the city, attended the funeral of a deceased Ukrainian soldier, and spoke to refugees fleeing the conflict.

==== In the West Bank ====
In 2024, Yeung reported with the BBC on violence in the West Bank in the months following the October 7th Hamas attacks against Israel. The report included an investigation into a fatal shooting by IDF soldiers that led to the death of two children, Basil and Adam, aged 15 and 8 years old respectively. In response to the investigation, Professor Ben Saul, UN Special Rapporteur on Human Rights and Counter-Terrorism said that "For Adam, this appears to be a violation of the International Humanitarian Law prohibitions on deliberately, indiscriminately or disproportionately attacking civilians, a war crime, and a violation of the human right to life". The report questioned whether the IDFs use of lethal force against civilians was too routine, and raised concerns about disparities in the policing of violence committed by Israeli settlers compared to Palestinians.

==== In Yemen ====
In 2018, Yeung travelled to Aden, Yemen, to report on the situation of the country's women during the Yemeni Civil War. In her Vice News report "The Women Fighting to Protect Yemen", she interviewed female fighters, child brides, domestic abuse victims, widows of the conflict and female protestors, and chewed khat with government officials from the Yemeni Interior Ministry; their takes on the country's problems related to gender discrimination, gender violence and financial displacement of Yemeni women were covered. She also interviewed former child soldiers of the Houthi movement.

== Awards and recognition ==
In 2017, Yeung won a Gracie Award for TV National Reporter/Correspondent for her work on Afghan Women’s Rights for Vice on HBO, after appearing the year prior on Marie Claire's list of America's 50 Most Influential Women. In 2019, the Newswomen's Club of New York presented her with the Marie Colvin Front Page Award for Foreign Correspondence.

In 2022 Vice News and Yeung were two-time winners of awards from the Foreign Press Association (FPA) of London, Yeung and Belle Cushing‍ in the category of Financial/Economic Story of the Year (for "Undercover in Guyana‍"), and then Yeung again, receiving that year's Journalist of the Year Award. Yeung's video reports, "Yemen: The Forgotten War" and "Return of The Taliban", both for Vice News, won Emmy Awards in the News category in 2022. Yeung, Adam Desiderio, and others at Vice News received a Peabody Award for their reporting in the 2022 short documentary, "No Justice for Women in the Taliban's Afghanistan," which the award announcement describes the awards as being for their "bearing witness as a humanitarian crisis unfolds", and describes as "poignant and powerful" its reporting from "households gripped by poverty and food insecurity... [on] the country’s hunger problem and the dismal policies around women’s equality" following the U.S.' withdrawal in 2020-2021.

== Personal life ==
Yeung has been in a relationship with British-Iranian journalist and director Benjamin Zand since 2017. In June 2024, she gave birth to their first child. The family live in London.
