= Overvaal =

Overvaal may refer to:

- Overvaal Stereo
- Overvaal (House of Assembly of South Africa constituency)
- Regiment Overvaal
