= R515 road =

R515 road may refer to:

- R515 road (Ireland)
- R515 (South Africa)
