= Kleinfontein =

- Autonomous town
- Location within Gauteng Location within South Africa Location within Africa
- Coordinates: 25.832°S 28.501°E
- Country: South Africa
- Province: Gauteng
- Municipality: City of Tshwane
- Established: 1992

Area
  - Total: 8.6 km^{2} (3.3 sq mi)

Population
  - Total: 1,200
  - Density: 140/km^{2} (360/sq mi)

Racial makeup (2011)
  - White: 54.62%
  - Black African: 43.06%
  - Coloured: 0.29%
  - Other: 2.02%

First languages (2011)
  - Afrikaans: 50.00%
  - Northern Sotho: 13.87%
  - English: 7.23%
  - Southern Ndebele: 6.07%
  - Zulu: 5.20%
  - Other: 17.63%
- Time zone: UTC+2 (SAST)
- Website: http://www.kleinfontein.net/

Kleinfontein is a volkstaat culturally segregated whites-only Afrikaans-speaking settlement near Pretoria, South Africa that was founded in 1992. Members of the African National Congress and Democratic Alliance youth have denounced the settlement and the continued existence of Afrikaner-only settlements in post-Apartheid South Africa. Kleinfontein was founded by the Boere-Vryheidsbeweging after the 1992 South African apartheid referendum.

== History ==
The entrance to the town displays a bust of Paul Kruger, a monument that commemarates the Battle of Blood River, the day Jan van Riebeeck landed in South-Africa, Paardekraal and a bust of Hendrik Verwoerd, considered by some as the "father of Apartheid"; the community obtained the bust from a cultural group.

As of 2013, the population of Kleinfontein was about 900 Afrikaners during the day, of which about 650 were residents and about 400 were shareholders. Kleinfontein's area has grown from the original 500 hectares to the current 860 hectares, and stretches just off the N4 highway beyond the Boschkop road. As of November 2013, the Gauteng legislature recognised Kleinfontein as a cultural community. The City of Pretoria still refused to declare it a separate development or a formal township. Efforts to be recognized as a separate legal entity have not been successful. Following the legislature's investigation into Kleinfontein, there were 450 shareholders and 1,000 residents, living in around 300 homes. Article 185 of the South African Constitution allows citizens of a similar cultural, linguistic, or religious group to associate with each other.

The settlement consists of a single, undivided property. The ownership of individual residents is by a shareblock scheme similar to its sister town Orania. Van Wyk (2014) reports that two categories of inhabitants can be distinguished: older, retired people and younger middle-class professionals.

== Criticism ==
Kleinfontein has been criticised for its policy of prohibiting all non-Afrikaners from settling in the community. Protests were held in May 2013 when the Democratic Alliance and the ANC competed in local elections. The community has also been criticised by the South African government for engaging in practices that once led to a "divided South Africa." Residents of the community defend their practice by saying that they are defending their own separate cultural identity.

Some residents of the community have also objected to the "restricted" nature of the community which prevents them from selling their home to the buyer of their choice.

== Geography ==
The town is located roughly halfway between Pretoria and Bronkhorstspruit. It lies just south of the N4, just west of the R515, a few kilometers south of Rayton, on the Magaliesberg mountain range at the historical terrain where the Battle of Diamond Hill (Afrikaans: die slag van Donkerhoek) took place during the Second Boer War.

== Demographics ==
In the 2011 census, the town recorded a population of 347 in 135 households, representing a population density of 14.21 people and 5.53 households per square kilometre. The town reported having an older than average population, with the largest age group being 40 to 44-year-olds at 10.57%, though this was closely followed by children under four at 10.00%. The town also had an above-average male population, with 57.06% of the town's population being male and 42.94% being female.

Despite being referred to as a segregationist "Whites-only" settlement, the town has a multiracial and multilingual population. In 2011, 54.62% of the population reported being White, while 43.06% reported being Black, 2.02% belonging to other racial groups and 0.29% being Coloured. 50.00% of the town's population reported having Afrikaans as their first language, while 13.87% reported speaking Southern Sotho, 7.23% English, 6.07% Southern Ndebele, 5.20% Zulu, 4.34% Southern Sotho, 4.05% Tswana, 2.02% Venda, 2.02% Xhosa, 1.73% other languages and 0.87% South African Sign Language (SASL).

== In popular culture ==
The settlement has been featured in a documentary by British filmmaker Ben Zand.

== See also ==
- Orania, Northern Cape, another Afrikaner-based community
- Balmoral, Mpumalanga
