= Waterkloof Four =

Group convicted of murder in Pretoria, South Africa

The so-called Waterkloof Four consists of four boys, ages 14 to 16, who were found guilty and sentenced for the murder of an unidentified homeless man in Pretoria. They were also found guilty on a charge of assault with intent to do grievous bodily harm. The four members are: Christoff Becker, Frikkie du Preez, Gert van Schalkwyk and Reinach Tiedt. Three of them were learners at the Hoërskool Waterkloof at the time, while Becker was attached to the nearby Hoërskool Garsfontein.

== Conviction ==
In 2004, the four (then) schoolboys pleaded not guilty to a charge of murdering an unknown man who was found with serious injuries in a park in Moreleta Park. They also pleaded not guilty to a charge of assault with intent to do grievous bodily harm after another homeless man was assaulted that same night on December 2, 2001. Two of the boys were fifteen and the other two sixteen when the incident occurred.

In 2005 they were found guilty on both charges. In 2007 they were each sentenced to 12 years in prison. They appealed against their conviction, but this was dismissed by the Court of Appeal in 2008.

== Parole ==
Tiedt and Van Schalkwyk were released for eighteen months in December 2011, but were readmitted to prison after the Department of Correctional Services successfully appealed their early release.

On 11 February 2014, all four were released under strict parole conditions. They served five and a half years of their sentences and were eligible for a special sentence reduction of six months. Therefore, in terms of legislation, they served half of their sentence and were eligible for parole (until it expires in 2019). Tiedt and Van Schalkwyk were released from Zonderwater Prison near Cullinan and Becker and Du Preez from Kgosi Mampuru prison (Pretoria Central).

Five days later, on February 16, 2014, Becker and Du Preez were arrested again for the alleged use of alcohol and a party they captured on video in prison. Their parole was subsequently revoked, which would be reconsidered after a further year of imprisonment. Both were detained for a further ten months and released on parole in December 2014.
