= Zonderwater Prison =

Prison in South Africa

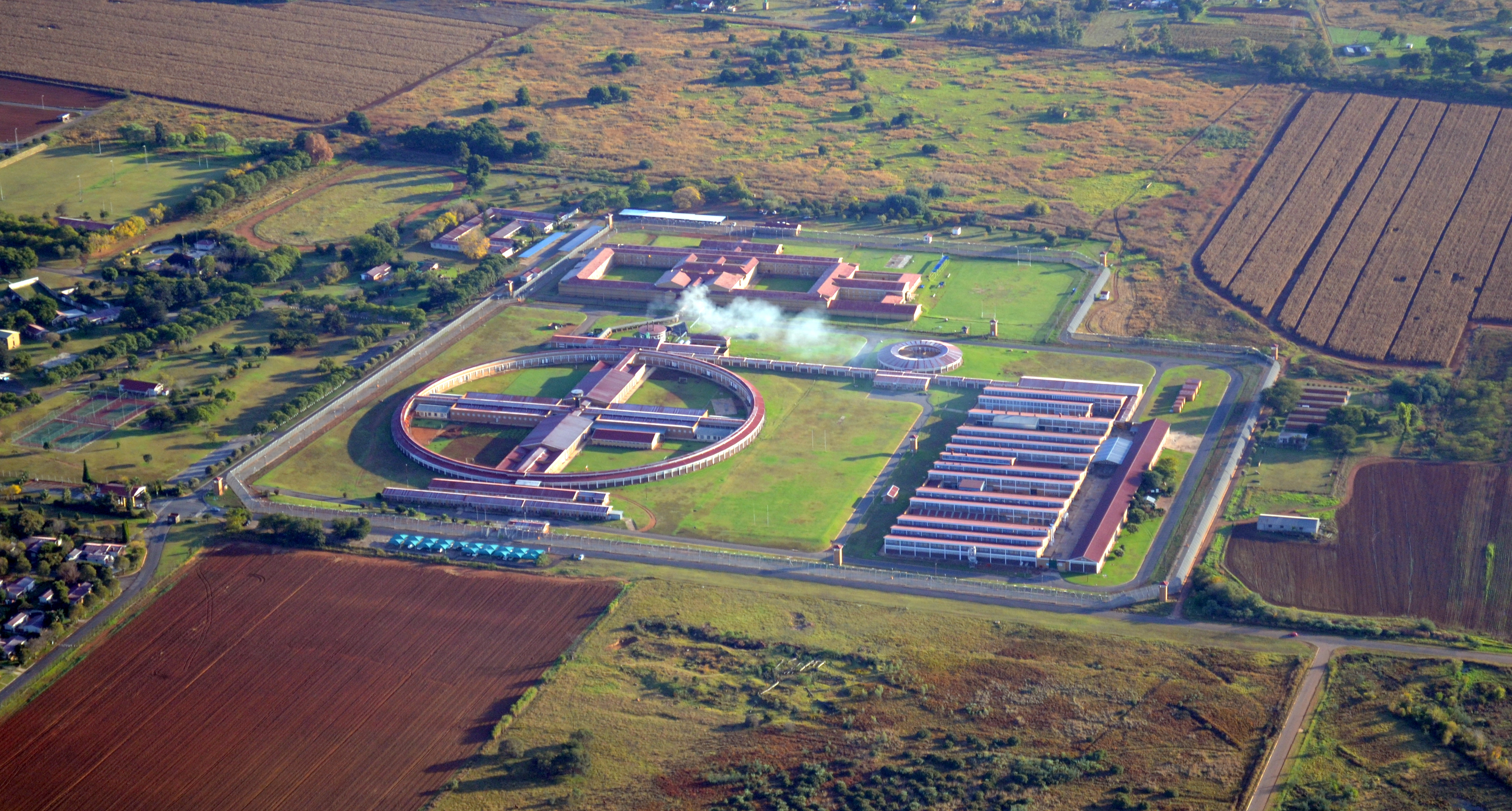
- Interactive map of Zonderwater Prison
- Location: Cullinan, Gauteng, South Africa; 25°41′2″S 28°32′50″E
- Status: Operational
- Security class: Low security
- Population: 3,641
- Opened: 1941
- Managed by: Department of Correctional Services

Zonderwater Prison, also known as Zonderwater Correctional Services, is a prison in Cullinan, 10 km outside Rayton in Gauteng, South Africa. It is managed by the South African Department of Correctional Services. Some of South Africa's most notorious prisoners in history were held here.

During World War II, Zonderwater housed tens of thousands of Italian POWs. These prisoners were actively engaged in cultural, sports, and manufacturing activities to maintain morale.

Some people detained here include:

- Dimitri Tsafendas, murderer who stabbed Hendrik Verwoerd to death on 6 September 1966;
- André Stander, South African police officer and a bank robber;
- Two members of the so-called Waterkloof Four;
- Members of the Boeremag.
