= RTV Panorama =

Radio Televizija Panorama (English: Radio Television Panorama) was a local broadcasting company based in Pljevlja, Montenegro. The programmes of Radio Panorama and TV Panorama could be heard and seen in the Pljevlja area.

They closed down in 2013, due to high debts for broadcasting.
