= Marthinus Jacobus Oosthuizen =

Voortrekker farmer

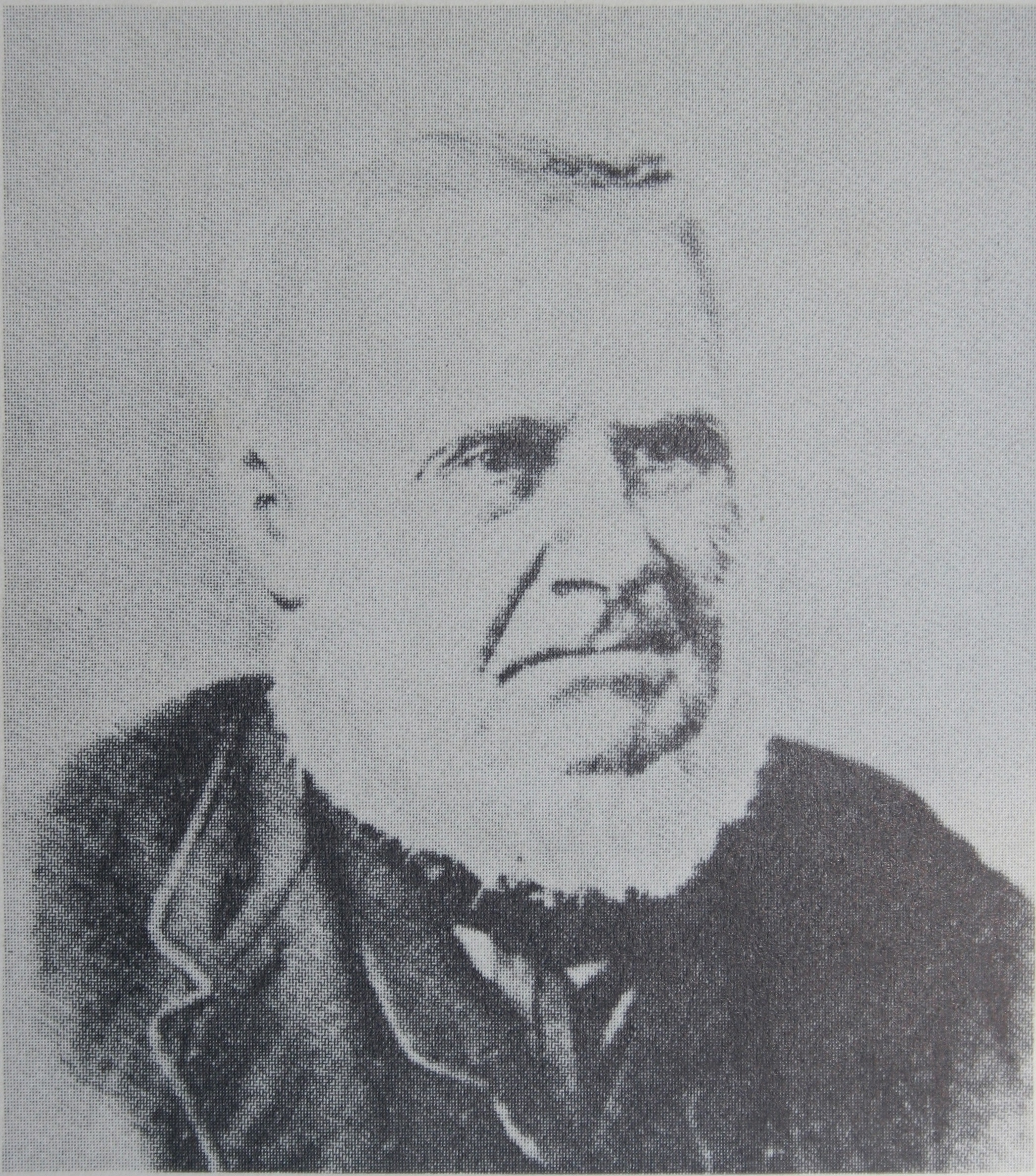

Marthinus Jacobus Oosthuizen (October 14, 1818 – April 2, 1897) was a Voortrekker farmer known for his heroism in battle.

He was born near Uitenhage and joined the "Groot Trek" (Great Trek). He became famous for his heroism during a battle on 16 February 1838 shortly after the murder of Piet Retief and his delegation, and the massacres of Weenen and Bloukrans. After taking his own family to safety, he joined other men of his "trek" to await the coming Zulu army. When they eventually ran out of ammunition, he mounted his horse and stormed right through the ranks of an estimated 1,500 Zulus, fetched gunpowder and bullets from one of the wagons, and then returned the same way right through the army of the surprised Zulus. He eventually settled on a farm in Natal where he died in 1897.
