= Boervolk Radio =

- Kempton Park, Gauteng; South Africa

Programming
- Format: Afrikaans music, talk shows

History
- First air date: 1998

Links
- Website: www.boervolkradio.co.za

Boervolk Radio presented by the Transvaal Separatists, is an internet-only radio station based in Kempton Park, South Africa.

== History ==
The station was established in 1998 by Theuns Cloete, one of three members of the Transvaal Separatists think tank. The mission of the station was to broadcast Afrikaans music and talk shows about Boer identity and culture, but also as mouthpiece for the Transvaal Separatists. It supports Afrikaans music from independent artists, as noted by Wildhorse Entertainment where songs are made freely available to listeners of Boervolk Radio.

The primary perspective of the Transvaal Separatists was that all individual tribes which were forcibly included first in the Union of South Africa and later the Republic of South Africa, should have the opportunity for self-determination within the southern African region. This view of devolution of power from the National Party (South Africa) controlled apartheid government was shared by the federalist solution proposed at the Kwazulu/Natal Indaba. At the Natal Indaba the traditional Zulu leaders acknowledged the interest of the Boer people in the northern part of Kwazulu-Natal. The Zulu people were and remain the majority people of the KwaZulu-Natal region.

The station has not supported any political parties or religious groups from its founding. This perspective remains unchanged to this day. The station prides itself in always urging listeners to research political, national and international affairs themselves as opposed to blindly following activist groups and political parties. It is known for speaking out against movements supporting violent protests and actions, specifically from right-wing groups. For this reason it has endured scorn from the right, contrary to some media reports that the think tank was a right-wing organisation itself.

The Transvaal Separatists strongly opposed violent protest prior to the 1994 elections in South Africa. It held meetings with various political parties to the right of the political spectrum in the 1980s and early 1990s in an attempt to convince these groups that joining open discussions with all relevant role players in South Africa was the only viable route towards transition from minority rule. The Transvaal Separatists had specific discussions with Eugène Terre'Blanche of the Afrikaner Weerstandsbeweging to convince him of the importance to join CODESA negotiations. These talks culminated in a meeting with the then State President of South Africa, FW de Klerk in 1989.

Boervolk Radio, represented by Theuns Cloete, was interviewed on 6 January 2007 by The Right Perspective, a talk show based in New York City, on the 150th anniversary of the Vierkleur flag. The interview was recorded and is available here together with a synopsis of the podcast. On 25 September 2012 Boervolk Radio was a guest of Deanna Spingola on the Spingola Speaks show of Republic Broadcasting Network.

the station is now referred to as ZAR Boervolk Radio.

== Interviews ==
The station has interviewed the following parties, groups and individuals:

- Afrikaner Weerstandsbeweging - Eugène Terre'Blanche
- Herstigte Nasionale Party - Andries Breytenbach
- Herstigte Nasionale Party - Jaap Marais
- Conservative Party (South Africa) - Andries Treurnicht
- Boerestaat Party - founder Robert van Tonder
- OASE - Cor Ehlers
- Steve Hofmeyr

== Presenters ==
- Theuns Cloete
