= Rayton =

- Location within Gauteng Location within South Africa
- Coordinates: 25°44′22″S 28°31′44″E
- Country: South Africa
- Province: Gauteng
- Municipality: City of Tshwane

Area
  - Total: 145.99 km^{2} (56.37 sq mi)

Population (2011)
  - Total: 8,166
  - Density: 55.94/km^{2} (144.9/sq mi)

Racial makeup (2011)
  - Black African: 37.5%
  - Coloured: 1.0%
  - Indian/Asian: 0.3%
  - White: 60.7%
  - Other: 0.5%

First languages (2011)
  - Afrikaans: 58.6%
  - Northern Sotho: 11.1%
  - English: 7.8%
  - S. Ndebele: 4.0%
  - Other: 18.5%
- Time zone: UTC+2 (SAST)
- Postal code (street): 1001
- PO box: 1001
- Area code: 012
- Website: www.rayton.co.za

Rayton is a town on the R515 road in the City of Tshwane Metropolitan Municipality in Gauteng, to the south of Cullinan. It started out as a tin shack mining town on the farm Elandshoek. During its boom days the town served the needs of thousands of diggers and prospectors working for the Schiller, Montrose and Dunmore mining companies. A mini diamond rush sparked by Sir Thomas Cullinan's discovery of a kimberlite diamond pipe (which has since been named Cullinan Diamond Mine) nearby is what caused the town to boom.

== History ==
The original Rayton Junction was laid out along a spur of the main NZASM railway line, which was completed in 1895 to connect the Republic of Transvaal's capital, Pretoria to the port in Delagoa Bay, Mozambique. Officials in the "Montrose Diamond Mining Company" did the town planning and named the hamlet after Lady Rachel Ray Williston, wife of the company's first manager, Colonel Balliston.

The town's first—and at the time the only—brick building was the original magistrate's office, which dates from this early time. During the Second World War Italian prisoners of war were interned at Zonderwater just north of town, and massive military logistics and supply depots were established between Cullinan and Rayton.

After the war, the Stella Diamond Mining Company bought the land around the town and declared a peri-urban municipality with relatively cheap properties. Rayton's proximity to Pretoria's expanding eastern suburbs allowed steady growth from the 1970s into the latter part of the 20th century. Today, Rayton is a thriving town that serves the need of prison wardens at the nearby Zonderwater Prison, staff at the Cullinan diamond mine as well as the surrounding farming community, with the Willem Prinsloo agricultural museum celebrating the area's rich agricultural history on the farm Kaalfontein. Many settled town residents have found employment in surrounding suburbs of Pretoria.

== Demographics ==
Historical population
Year	Pop.	±%
2001	2,964	—
2011	8,166	+175.5%
Source: Statistics South Africa

=== Racial makeup ===
Race	2001 Census		2011 Census	
	Number	%	Number	%
White	2,754	92.91%	4,959	60.73%
Black African	207	6.98%	3,062	37.50%
Coloured	3	0.10%	84	1.03%
Other	0	0	40	0.49%
Indian or Asian	0	0	21	0.26%

== Notable people ==
- Jan Ellis: Springbok loose forward who played 38 tests for South Africa until 1976.
- Bennie Labuschagne: 1992 Olympian, three-time African champion, Commonwealth Games medallist and named one of South Africa's six Wrestlers of the 20th Century, now Head Coach of University of Pretoria's wrestling club.
