= R515 (South Africa) =

Regional route in South Africa

Regional route R515

Route information
- Length: 27.5 km (17.1 mi)

Major junctions
- South end: R25
- R104 near Rayton; N4 near Rayton
- North end: R513 in Cullinan

Location
- Country: South Africa
- Major cities: Rayton, Cullinan

Highway system
- Numbered routes of South Africa
← R514	→ R516

The R515 is a Regional Route in the City of Tshwane Metropolitan Municipality in Gauteng, South Africa that connects Cullinan with Kleinfontein via Rayton.

== Route ==
Its northern terminus is a junction with the R513 in Cullinan. Heading south, it passes through Rayton and crosses the R104 and the N4 highway (Maputo Corridor) afterwards. It then bypasses Kleinfontein before reaching its end at a t-junction with the R25, midway between Bapsfontein to the south-west and Bronkhorstspruit to the north-east.
