= Ben Zand =

British filmmaker (born 1991)

- Born: Benjamin Zand; 2 February 1991 (age 35); Liverpool, Merseyside, England
- Citizenship: United Kingdom
- Occupations: documentarian; journalist
- Years active: 2016–present
- Children: 1
- Website: zand.land

Benjamin Zand (born 2 February 1991) is a British journalist and YouTuber. He has received a AIB award and an RTS award.

== Early life ==
Benjamin Zand grew up in Liverpool. He has referenced his upbringing as being in a "rough kind of aggressive environment". He attended Bowring Comprehensive School.

== Career ==
=== Television career ===
Zand has worked for Channel 4, Discovery Channel, and the BBC.

=== Journalism career ===
While at university, Zand worked for the Edinburgh Evening News and The Scotsman.

=== YouTube career ===
Since September 2025, YouTube has hosted Zand's show Humans.

=== Documentaries ===
Much of Zand's work focuses on the manosphere and toxic masculinity and incel-culture such as looksmaxxing and "gooning" (excessive pornography consumption). Other topics include serial killer Samuel Little, QAnon, whites-only settlement Kleinfontein and musician R Kelly.

=== Podcasts ===
With fellow journalist Stacey Dooley, Zand has launched the podcast Untangled. He also releases The Zandland Show.

== Awards ==
Year	Award	Category	Show	Result
2023	British Academy Television Awards	Television/short form	Kingpin Cribs	Nominated
2022	Association for International Broadcasting Awards	International affairs documentary	The Cult of Conspiracy: QAnon	Won
2016	Royal Television Society	Television Journalism Awards		Won

== See also ==
- Louis Theroux
- Stacey Dooley
