= Boere-Vryheidsbeweging =

South African political movement

Boere-Vryheidsbeweging (Farmers Freedom Movement) is a Boer Liberation Political Movement, advocating an independent homeland for Boer/Afrikaners based on the old Transvaal and Orange Free State Republics, which lost their independence to British colonialism after the Boer War.
