= Radio Laeveld =

South Africa
- Broadcast area: Mpumalanga, South Africa
- Frequency: 100.5 MHz

Programming
- Language: Afrikaans

History
- First air date: 31 May 2003

Links
- Website: http://www.radiolaeveld.co.za/

Radio Laeveld is an Afrikaans-language radio station broadcasting on 100.5 FM in the Lowveld area of Mpumalanga, South Africa. It received its first four-year broadcast licence on 1 March 2003 and began broadcasting 31 May 2003. Broadcasting mainly in Afrikaans and in English. The footprint covers roughly a 100km radius from Nelspruit in Mpumalanga. Listeners are from all walks of life and includes farmers, office bound workers, representatives and travelling sales people, tourists, small and medium enterprise owners & managers, teachers, municipal and local community care organizations. The targeted audience are in LSM 6-10, age group 35–55 and program content focused on family Life style.

== Current Team ==
Current Board Members: Kobus Bester (Chairman), Vanessa Roets (Public Relations), Jan-Frans Van Aard, Lasea Swift, Estelle Roe, Marilise Heyneke.

Current Management & Employees: Gerhardt Nel (Program Manager), Connie Moyana (Cleaning), Hein Van Den Berg (Sound Technician).

Current Presenters: Amanda Botha, Ludi Botha, Derek Wolf, Roelf Van Jaarsveld, Geraldine Scholtz, Helmi White, Tom Farmer, Charissa Du Toit, Anmané Eckard. Charles Gentle returned (in 2018) after a short distraction from broadcasting on 100.5FM.

Current Journalists: Mireilles de Villiers.

Current Sales People: Alichia Van Ee.

== Previous Team ==
The very first voice heard at 6h00 on 31 May 2003 was Pieter Rischmuller (on loan from Radio Pretoria), who at the time was asked to assist the station until it found its feet. After that various presenters from the community were part of the different shows on the radio:

Previous Board : Adam Van Deventer, Dalene Muller, Annemarie van Biljon, Christo Botha

Previous Management : Martin Jansen (first station manager), James Williams (also the first program manager and sound technician of the station), Gert Booysen (station manager), Robin Jansma (Station Manager)

Previous Office : Loretta Vorster (Reception), Donald Grey (Sound technician), Coenie van Deventer (Sound technician) Richard Bessinger (Sound technician).

Previous Sales Representatives : Yolande Calvert Louw Botes Jannie vd Bergh Ansie Botes Cornu Du Pisanie

Previous Presenters : Neels Kemp, Sanett Oosthuizen, Jan Prinsloo, Lappies Labuschagne (later acting-station manager), Denis Wales, Bokkie Taute, Bez Bezuidenhout, Andri Roodt, Endria Stronkhorst, Cindy Labuschagne (first teen-presenter), Dennis Wales, Sarie Saayman, Jannie van der Berg, Giep Van Zyl, Franswa Eloff, Theresa Schoeman, Jeanne Steyn, Jean Steyn, Sanette van Wyk (Mattheus), Frieda Rieger, Annemarie van Heerden, Anike vd Merwe, Pieter Malan, and more. (t.b.c.)

== History ==
It all started when the need for a local community radio station, focused on Afrikaans culture and language in the Lowveld of Mpumalanga was identified by a group like minded people known as 'Die Verkenners'. The idea was spearheaded, around two years before the license was awarded, by Albertus Van Zijl (a local business man and lawyer), who also later became the first Chairman. At that stage the frequency 100.5FM was in use by Radio Pretoria who were broadcasting from Pretoria. Negotiations centered around the fostering of Afrikaans language, believes and culture in the Lowveld through this broadcasting service. The original studios were in the White River Centre (from 31 May 2003 to 30 September 2005) and later moved to Nelspruit (1 August 2005) in the Sonpark centre (where it currently still is).

== Coverage ==
Radio Laeveld reaches the following towns:

- Nelspruit
- Witrivier
- Barberton
- Kaapchehoop
- Kaapmuiden
- Malelane
- Hectorspruit
- Komatipoort
- Skukuza
- Hazyview
- Sabie
- Graskop
- Lydenburg
- Machadodorp
- Dullstroom
- Belfast

== Shows ==
Monday to Friday

- 05h00-06h00 Landbouradio
- 06h00-09h00 Breakfast show
- 9h00-9h30 (Friday) WieleFM
- 09h00-10h00 Promotional Talks
- 10h00-12h00 Family Lifestyle
- 12h00-12h30 Vlooimark
- 12h30-15h00 Mid Day show
- 15h00-18h00 Afternoon Drive
- 18h00-20h00 (Monday) Gospel Music Program
- 18h00-19h00 (Tuesday & Friday) Young Gospel program
- 18h00-19h00 (Wednesday) Local Gospel Program
- 18h00-19h00 (Thursday) Youth Interest Program
- 19h00-22h00 (Friday) South African non-commercial Rock Program
- 19h00-20h00 (Wednesday) Afrikaans Literature & Culture
- 20h00-23h00 (Monday to Thursday) Late-night Music Requests
- 22h00-23h00 (Friday) Blues Music Program

Saturday

- 05h00-07h00 LandbouradioLandbouradio
- 07h00-09h00 Saturday Breakfast
- 09h00-10h00 Lowveld Experience
- 10h00-12h00 Magazine Show
- 12h00-13h00 Vlooimark Vlooimark
- 13h00-15h00 Top 20 Top 20 Music
- 15h00-18h00 Sport & Food
- 18h00-19h00 Boere Music
- 19h00-23h00 Re-broadcasts

Sunday

- 05h00-08h00 Thought Of The Day
- 08h00-09h00 Gospel & Religion
- 09h00-10h00 Magazine Show
- 10h00-11h00 Gospel & Religion
- 11h00-12h00 Focus on Elders
- 12h00-14h00 Sunday Requests
- 14h00-17h00 Golden Oldies Music Program
- 17h00-18h00 Radio Drama Omnibus
- 18h00-19h00 Gospel & Religion
- 19h00-20h00 Evening Service (Sermon)
- 20h00-23h00 Gospel & Religion
