= Radio Rosestad 100.6 FM =

Rosestad 100.6 FM
- Bloemfontein; South Africa
- Frequency: 100.6 FM

Ownership
- Owner: OVSUK TRUST

History
- First air date: 1994

Links
- Website: www.rosestad.co.za

Rosestad 100.6 FM is a South African community-based radio station based in Bloemfontein, South Africa of the Free State.

Formed in 1994, Rosestad 100.6 FM was one of the first community radio stations to receive a license from ICASA. Rosestad 100.6 FM broadcasts to an Afrikaans understanding community with shared Christian values aiming to entertain, educate and inform the broader community of Bloemfontein and surroundings as a whole.

Rosestad 100.6 FM's license to broadcast is owned by the community it serves, represented by the OVSUK Trust.

Rosestad 100.6 FM is the number one choice within its community for 24 hour entertainment, often compared with the top commercial stations in South Africa.

== Coverage areas ==
From its Bloemfontein studio, it reaches:

- Boshof
- Winburg
- Petrusburg
- Verkeerdevlei
- Tweespruit
- Dealesville
- Bultfontein
- Brandfort
- Reddersburg
- Edenburg
- Thaba Nchu
- Touches

== Broadcast languages ==
- Afrikaans 90%
- English 10%

== Broadcast time ==
- 24/7

== Target audience ==
- Bloemfontein community & in the central Free State
- LSM Groups 6 - 10
- Age Group 25 - 55

== Programme format ==
- 40% Talk
- 60% Music

== Listenership Figures ==
40% Market Share in footprint. RAMS figures not available due to flawed methodology.
