= Pretoria FM =

- Pretoria; South Africa
- Broadcast area: Gauteng, North West, Limpopo, Mpumalanga, KwaZulu-Natal
- Frequency: 104.2 FM

Programming
- Language: Afrikaans

Pretoria FM, formerly Radio Pretoria is an Afrikaans community-based radio station in Pretoria, South Africa. It broadcasts 24 hours a day in stereo on 104.2 FM in the greater Pretoria area. Various other transmitters (with their own frequencies) in South Africa broadcast the station's content further afield, while the station is also available on Sentech's digital satellite platform. The station was founded seven months before the 1994 elections. From the start, it identified itself as a radio station for the Afrikaans speaking community. For a brief period, it broadcast informally from a makeshift studio east of Pretoria. Broadcasts were made possible with the help of among others, retired SABC employees. Post-1994, Radio Pretoria struggled for years to secure a permanent broadcasting license from the ANC government.

== History ==
(Established in 1994, available in 6 out of 9 provinces)

Pretoria FM is an Afrikaans community radio station in Pretoria and was established on 18 September 1993. Pretoria FM has 12 board members who are appointed annually by members of the company. Any member of the public can apply for membership and thus also have a say in what happens over the air. A turnaround strategy was launched by the board of directors in 2011 with the aim of expanding Pretoria FM to a professional Afrikaans station in all areas and the outcome of this was very successful. Pretoria FM has one of the largest and strongest non-state broadcasting networks, which is further complemented by internet and satellite technology and which makes it a radio station with great potential.

== Rebranding to Pretoria FM ==
In May 2013 at the MTN Radio Awards, Radio Pretoria was crowned as the radio station with the most loyal listeners. This achievement was repeated in and once again in 2021. On 9 May 2015, it was reported that, following 17 months of negotiations between the Independent Communications Authority of South Africa (ICASA) and Pretoria FM, ICASA agreed to issue new community radio licences to Pretoria FM and eight other community radio stations which broadcast under the Pretoria banner in the five northern provinces of South Africa, being Radio Drakensberg, Radio Dagbreek, Radio Magaliesberg, Radio Tafelkop, Radio Naboom, Radio Kransberg, Radio Ysterberg and Radio Wolkberg.

On 20 July 2015, the erstwhile Radio Pretoria announced its renaming as Pretoria FM. The aforesaid eight community radio stations would also be broadcasting under the Pretoria FM brand. On 6 March 2021, Pretoria FM introduced a new transmitter on the frequency 107.9FM, servicing Rustenburg, Brits, Marikana, Mooinooi, Kroondal, Broederstroom and parts of Hartbeespoort.

The station's acting chief executive officer is Hennie Koortzen.

== Transmitters ==
Pretoria FM operates 8 transmitters in towns in Gauteng, Limpopo, Free State, Mpumalanga, North West and KwaZulu-Natal. On the farm Kleinfontein just east of Pretoria, there is a 100m mast transmitting on 104.2 MHz.

== Target audience ==
- Educated
- Working class
- LSM 6–10
- Age Group 25 to 50+
- Female 56%, Male 44%

== Format ==
- Music 70%
- Talk 30%
