= Overvaal Stereo =

South Africa
- Frequency: 96.1 FM

Links
- Website: www.overvaalstereo.co.za

Overvaal Stereo is a South African community radio station based in the Free State.

== Coverage areas ==
- Potchefstroom
- Klerksdorp
- Odendaalsrus
- Coligny
- Welkom
- Kroonstad
- Virginia
- Parys
- Vanderbijlpark
- Sasolburg

== Broadcast languages ==
- Predominantly Afrikaans
- With some English

== Broadcast time ==
- 24/7 (Monday - Sunday)

== Target audience ==
- Afrikaans-speaking communities
- LSM Groups 6–10
- Age Group 25–49

== Programme format ==
- 40% Talk
- 60% Music

== Listenership Figures ==
Estimated Listenership
	7 Day
Jun 2013	7 000
May 2013	7 000
Feb 2013	6 000
Dec 2012	7 000
