= 1904 in South Africa =

- Decades: 1880s; 1890s; 1900s; 1910s; 1920s
- See also: List of years in South Africa

The following lists events that happened during 1904 in South Africa.

== Incumbents ==
- Governor of the Cape of Good Hope and High Commissioner for Southern Africa:Walter Hely-Hutchinson.
- Governor of the Colony of Natal: Henry Edward McCallum.
- Prime Minister of the Cape of Good Hope: John Gordon Sprigg (until 22 February), Leander Starr Jameson (starting 22 February).
- Prime Minister of the Orange River Colony: Alfred Milner.
- Prime Minister of the Colony of Natal: George Morris Sutton.

== Events ==
=== February ===
- Pneumonic plague breaks out in Johannesburg.

=== June ===
- 22 – The first of 62,000 Chinese labourers arrive in South Africa to relieve the shortage of unskilled mine workers.

=== Unknown date ===
- Der shtral, a Yiddish-language newspaper is founded.
- The Social Democratic Federation (SDF) is established in Cape Town.

== Births ==
- 16 February – Philip Rabinowitz, South African record-breaking sprinter (d. 2008)

== Deaths ==
- 3 June – Vincent Tancred, South African cricketer (b. 1875)
- 14 July – Paul Kruger, exiled president of the South African Republic, dies in Clarens, Switzerland, at the age of 78.
- 1 November – Willem Eduard Bok, politician (b. 1846)

== Railways ==
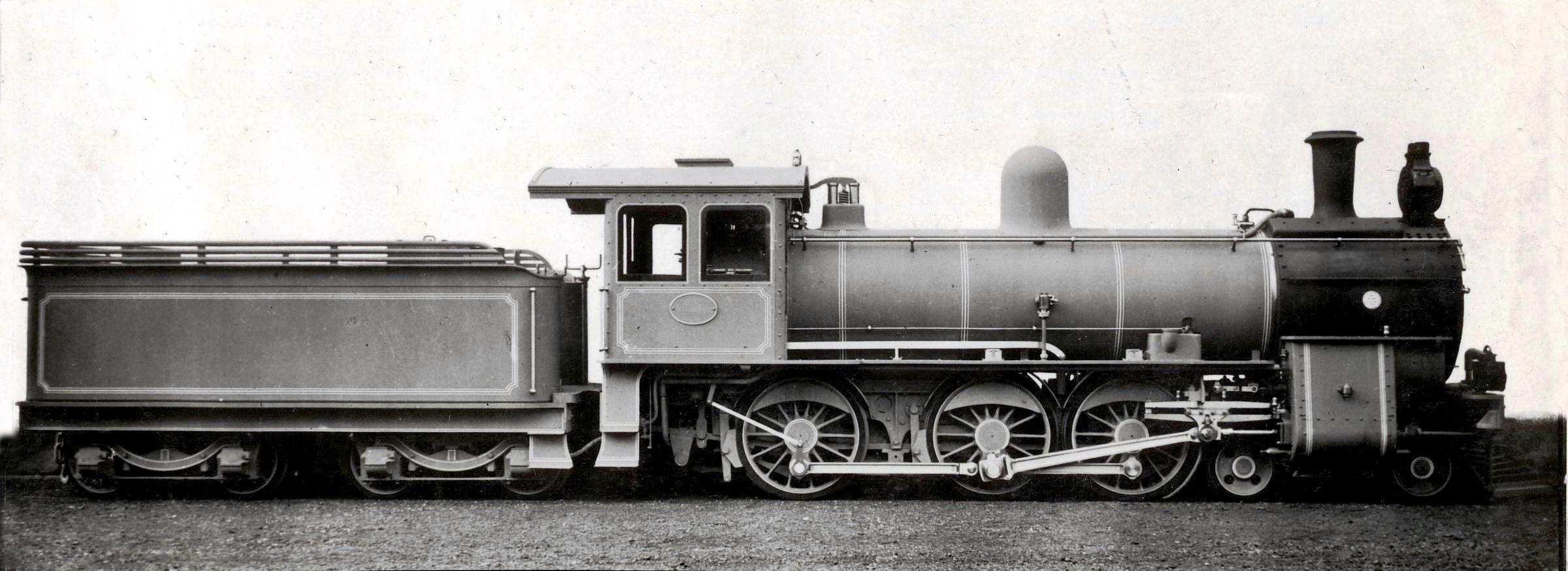
SAR Class 6L

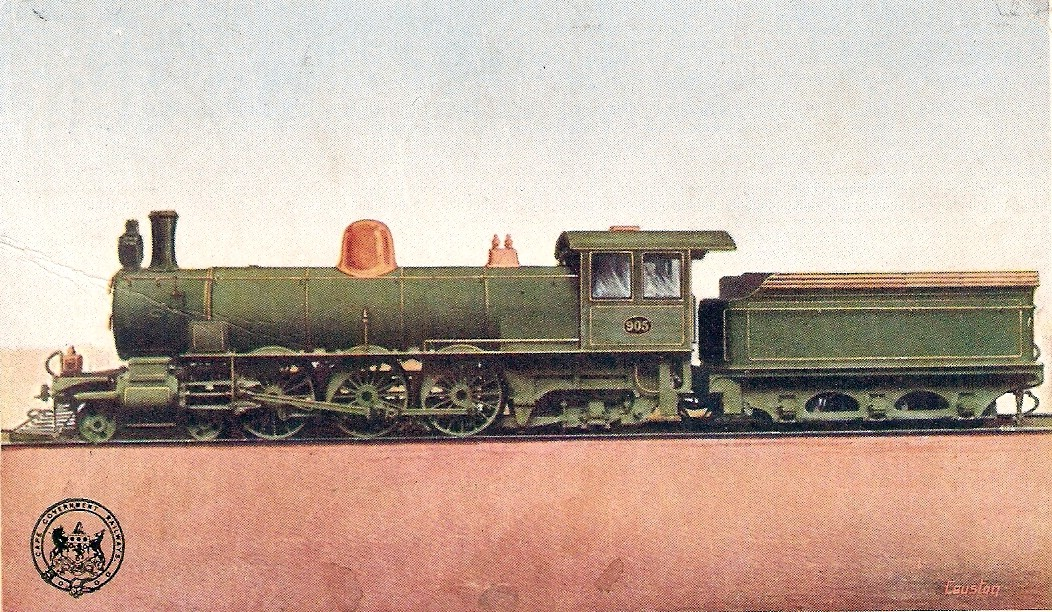
SAR Class 5B

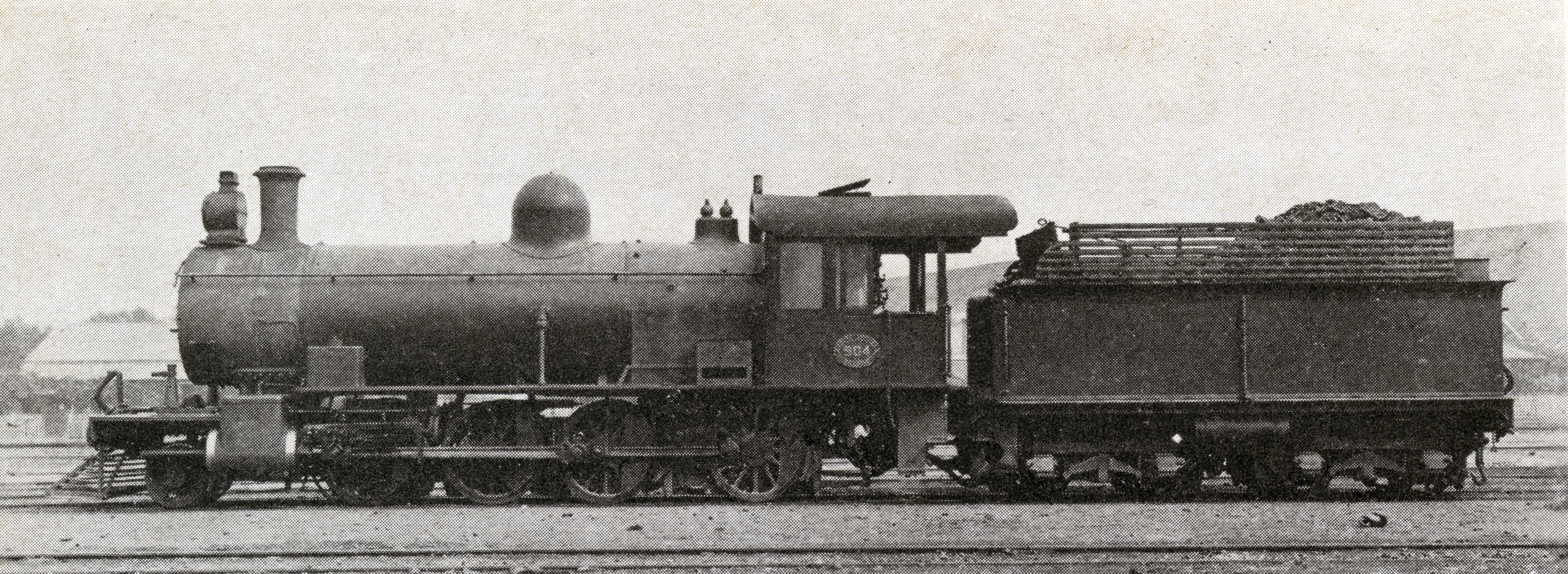
SAR Class 8Z

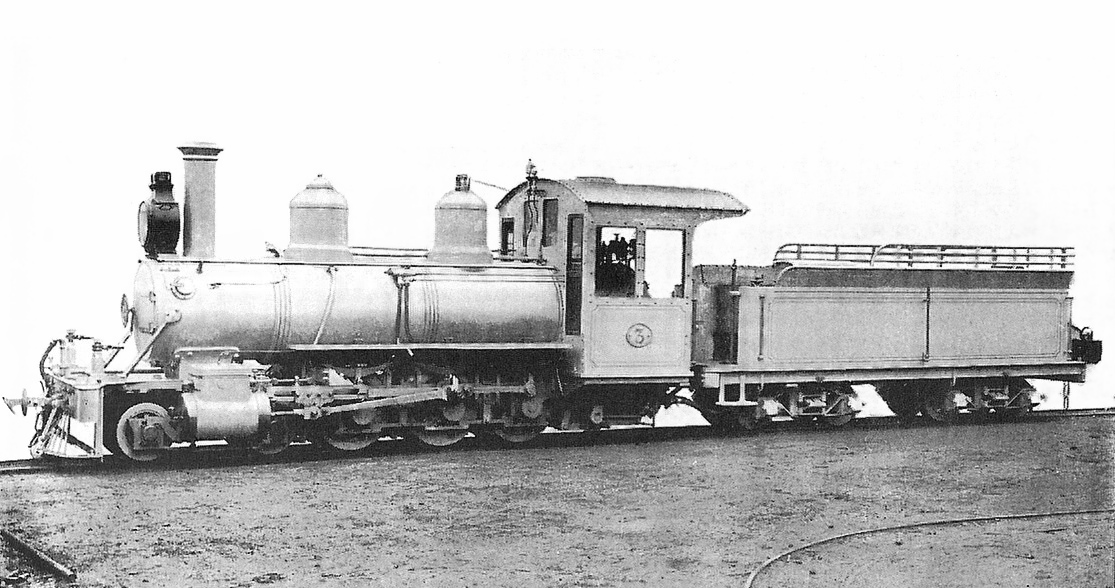
CGR Type B

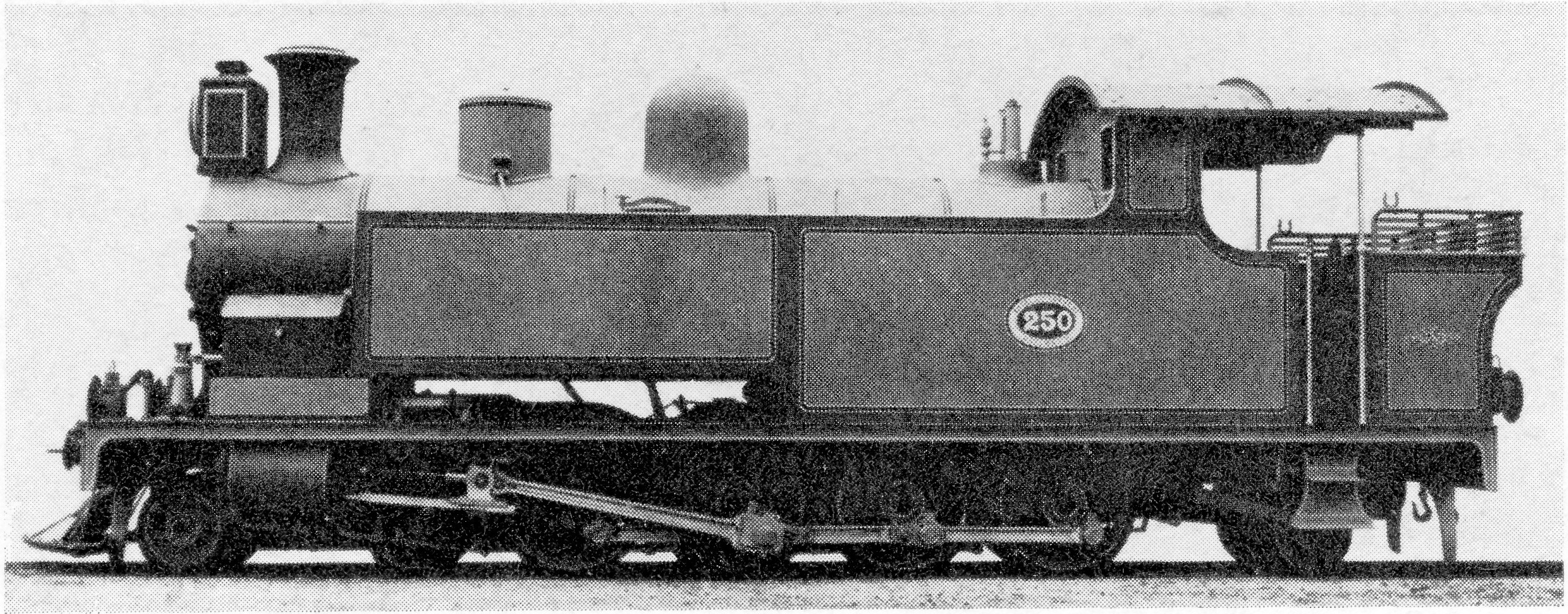
NGR Class E

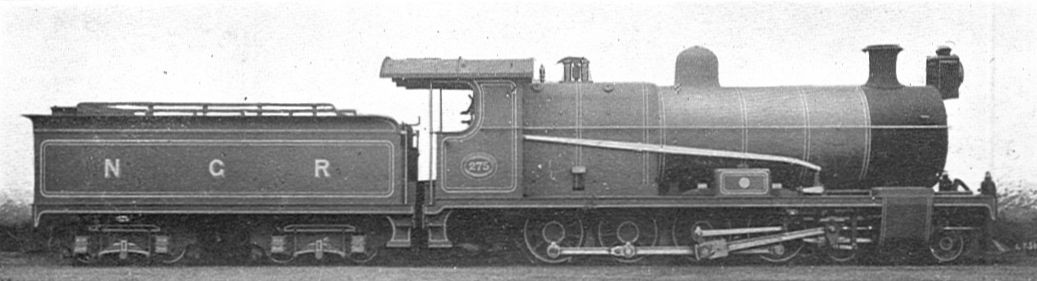
NGR Class B

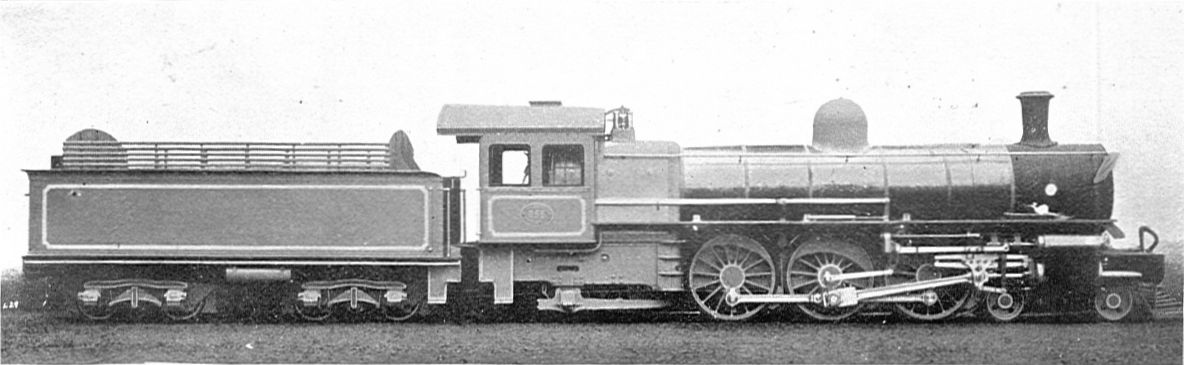
CSAR Class 10

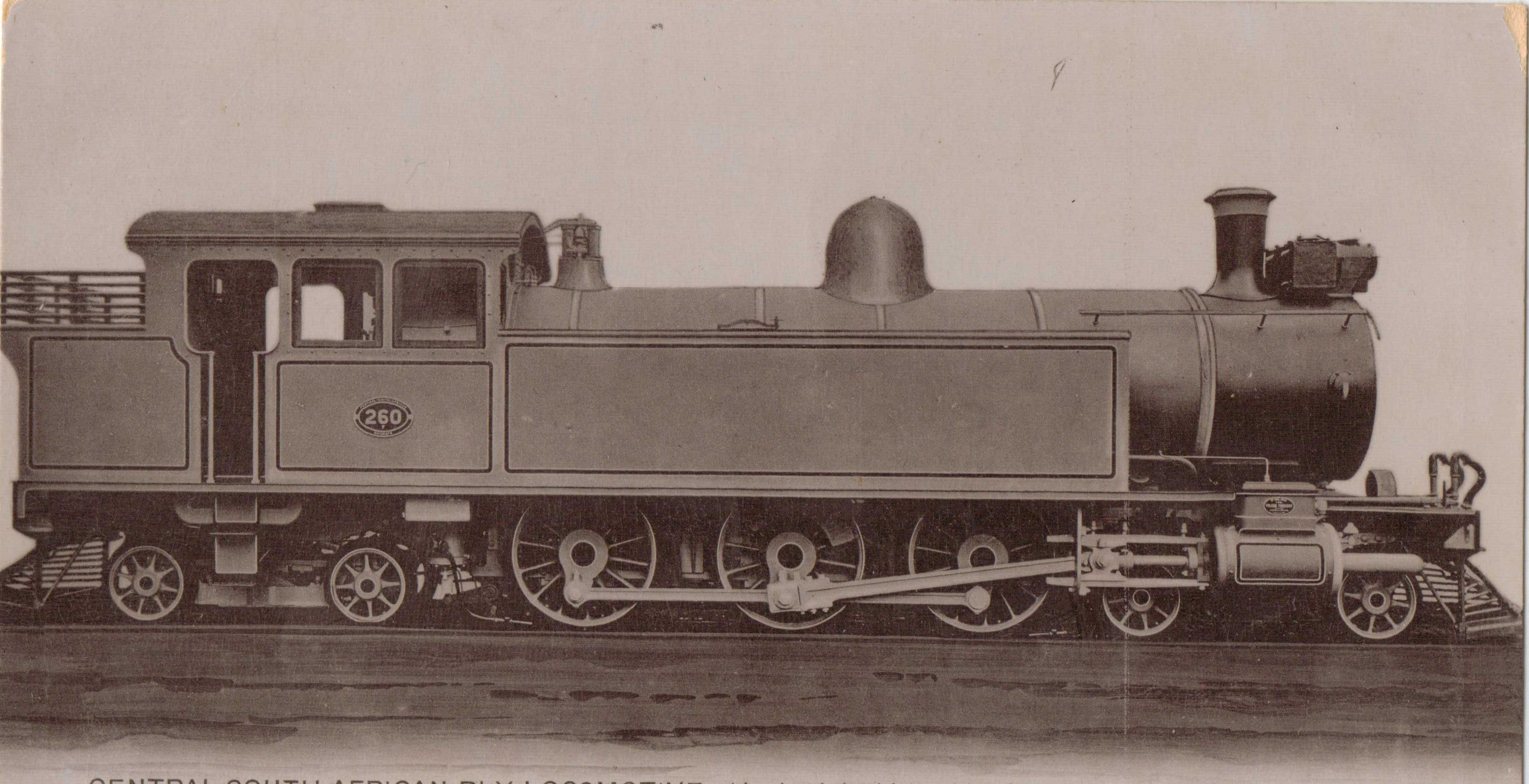
CSAR Class F

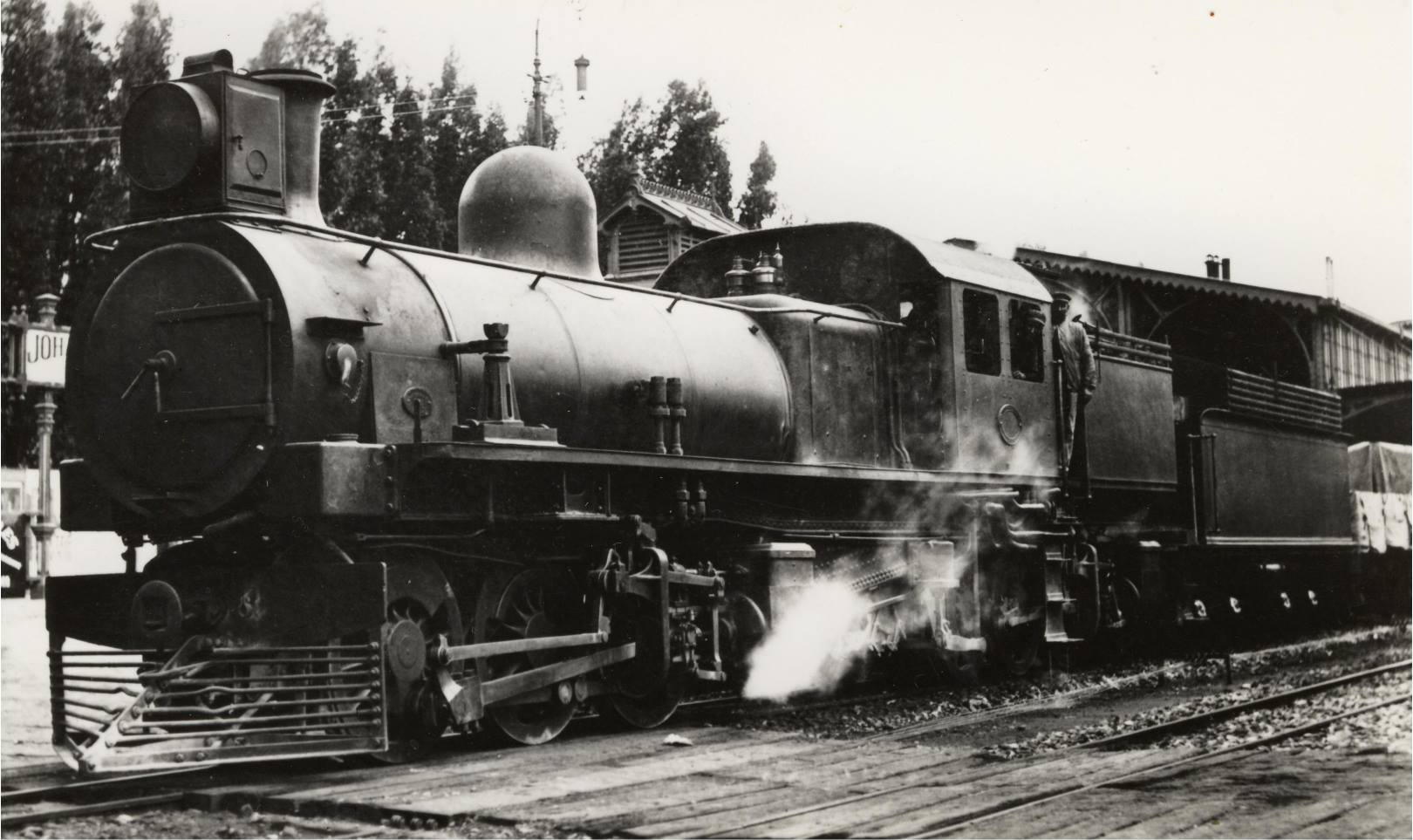
CSAR Class M

=== Railway lines opened ===
- 1 February – Cape Western – Maitland to Ottery, 7 miles (11.3 kilometres).
- 1 March – Cape Midland – Le Roux to Oudtshoorn, 16 miles 41 chains (26.6 kilometres).
- 7 June – Cape Western – Paarl to Franschhoek, 17 miles 10 chains (27.6 kilometres).
- 15 June – Free State – Thaba 'Nchu to Modderpoort, 45 miles 73 chains (73.9 kilometres).
- 17 August – Cape Eastern – Indwe to Xalanga, 31 miles 3 chains (50.0 kilometres).
- 1 September – Free State – Hamilton to Tempe, 4 miles (6.4 kilometres).
- 7 September – Cape Eastern – Amabele to Komga, 27 miles (43.5 kilometres).
- 17 October – Cape Eastern – Middledrift to Adelaide, 56 miles 64 chains (91.4 kilometres).
- 3 November – Natal – Pietermaritzburg to Elandskop, 35 miles 39 chains (57.1 kilometres).
- December – Cape Western – Artois to Ceres Road, 4 miles 38 chains (7.2 kilometres).
- 15 December – Transvaal – Langlaagte to Vereeniging, 44 miles 56 chains (71.9 kilometres).

=== Locomotives ===
Cape

- Four new Cape gauge locomotive types enter service on the Cape Government Railways (CGR):
  - Two experimental superheated 6th Class 4-6-0 locomotives. In 1912 they will be designated Class 6L by the South African Railways (SAR).
  - Four Karoo Class 4-6-2 Pacific passenger steam locomotives. In 1912 they will be designated Class 5B by the SAR.
  - The last eight 8th Class 2-8-0 Consolidation type locomotives. In 1912 they will be designated Class 8Z on the SAR.
  - The final batch of ten 8th Class 4-8-0 Mastodon type locomotives. In 1912 they will be designated Class 8F on the SAR.
- Six "Type B" 4-6-0 steam locomotives enter service on the Avontuur narrow gauge line in the Langkloof.
- A single 0-4-2 inverted saddle-tank locomotive named Caledonia is placed in service by the Cape Copper Company as a shunting engine at O'okiep in the Cape Colony.

Natal

- Two new Cape gauge locomotive types enter service on the Natal Government Railways (NGR):
  - Twenty-five Class E 4-8-2 Mountain type tank locomotives. In 1912 they will become the Class G on the SAR.
  - Fifty Class B 4-8-0 Mastodon type mainline steam locomotives. In 1912 they will be designated Class 1 on the SAR.
- The Natal Harbours Department places a single 0-6-0 saddle-tank locomotive named Sir Albert in service as dock shunter in Durban Harbour.

Transvaal

- Five new Cape gauge locomotive types enter service on the Central South African Railways (CSAR):
  - Five Class 9 4-6-2 Pacific type locomotives.
  - Fifteen Class 10 4-6-2 Pacific passenger locomotives.
  - Thirty-six Class 11 2-8-2 Mikado type locomotives.
  - Eight Class F 4-6-4T Baltic type tank locomotives in suburban service between Springs and Randfontein.
  - A single experimental 0-6-0+0-6-0 Class M Kitson-Meyer type articulated steam locomotive.
- The CSAR rebuilds most of its Reid Tenwheeler 4-10-2T tank locomotives to 4-8-0TT tank-and-tender locomotives. In 1912 these converted locomotives will be designated Class 13 on the SAR.
