= South African Class G 4-8-2T =

1904 design of steam locomotive

NGR Class E 4-8-2T South African Class G 4-8-2T
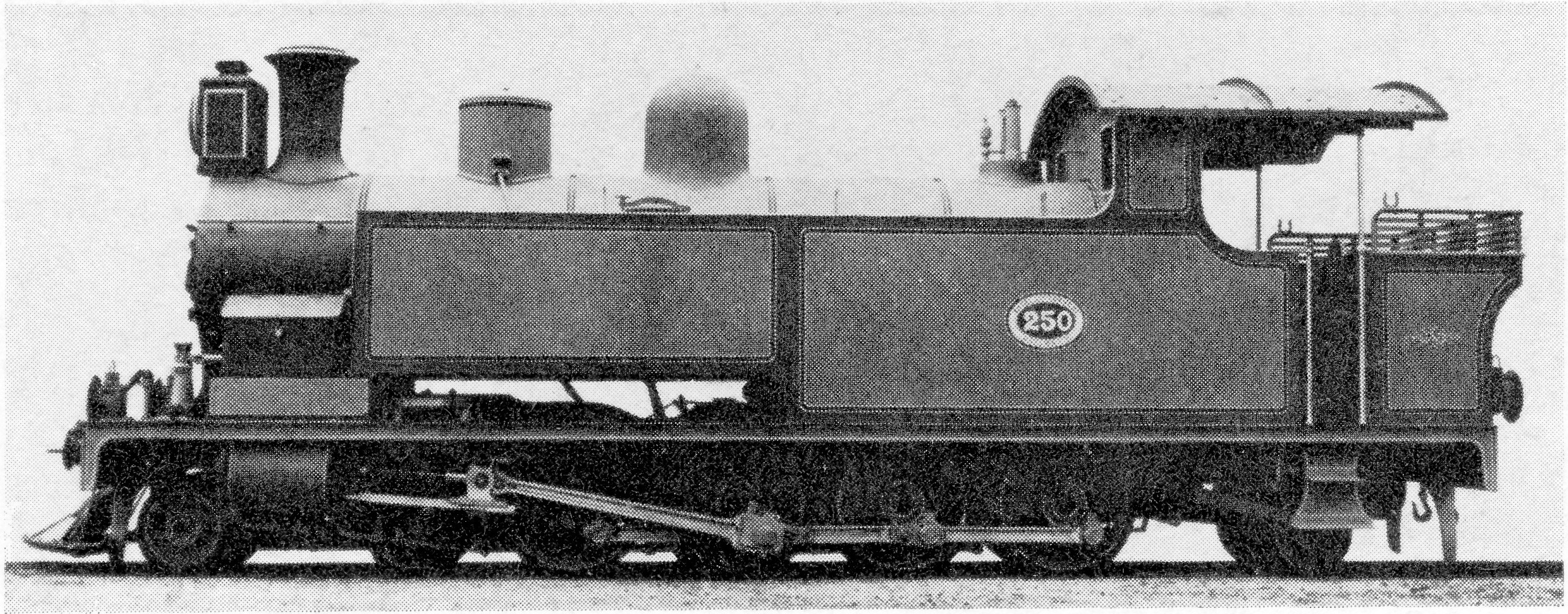
- NGR Class E no. 250, later SAR Class G no. 197
Type and origin
- Power type: Steam
- Designer: Natal Government Railways (D.A. Hendrie)
- Builder: North British Locomotive Company
- Serial number: 16060-16084
- Build date: 1904
- Total produced: 25
Specifications
- Configuration
  - Whyte: 4-8-2T (Mountain)
  - UIC: 2'D1'n2t
- Driver: 2nd coupled axle
- Gauge: 3 ft 6 in (1,067 mm) Cape gauge
- Leading dia.: 25 3/4 in (654 mm)
- Coupled dia.: 42 in (1,067 mm)
- Trailing dia.: 25 3/4 in (654 mm)
- Wheelbase: 26 ft 9 1/2 in (8,166 mm)
  - Leading: 5 ft 4 in (1,626 mm)
  - Coupled: 11 ft 9 in (3,581 mm)
- Length
  - Over couplers: 35 ft 5 in (10,795 mm)
- Height: 12 ft 5 5/8 in (3,800 mm)
- Frame type: Plate
- Axle load: 11 LT 10 cwt (11,680 kg)
  - Leading: 11 LT 12 cwt (11,790 kg)
  - 1st coupled: 10 LT 7 cwt 2 qtr (10,540 kg)
  - 2nd coupled: 11 LT 10 cwt (11,680 kg)
  - 3rd coupled: 10 LT 9 cwt (10,620 kg)
  - 4th coupled: 10 LT 6 cwt 2 qtr (10,490 kg)
  - Trailing: 6 LT 1 cwt (6,147 kg)
- Adhesive weight: 42 LT 13 cwt (43,330 kg)
- Loco weight: 109,080 lb (49,480 kg) empty 60 LT 6 cwt (61,270 kg)
- Fuel type: Coal
- Fuel capacity: 2 LT 10 cwt (2.5 t)
- Water cap.: 1,560 imp gal (7,090 L)
- Firebox
  - Type: Round-top
  - Grate area: 19 sq ft (1.8 m^{2})
- Boiler
  - Pitch: 7 ft (2,134 mm)
  - Diameter: 4 ft 4 7/8 in (1,343 mm)
  - Tube plates: 10 ft 4 in (3,150 mm)
  - Small tubes: 232: 1 3/4 in (44 mm)
- Boiler pressure: 175 psi (1,207 kPa)
- Safety valve: Ramsbottom
- Heating surface
  - Firebox: 125 sq ft (11.6 m^{2})
  - Tubes: 1,098 sq ft (102.0 m^{2})
  - Total surface: 1,223 sq ft (113.6 m^{2})
- Cylinders: Two
- Cylinder size: 18 in (457 mm) bore 22 in (559 mm) stroke
- Valve gear: Stephenson
- Valve type: Balanced slide
- Couplers: Johnston link-and-pin AAR knuckle (1930s)
Performance figures
- Tractive effort: 22,280 lbf (99.1 kN) @ 75%
Career
- Operators: Natal Government Railways; South African Railways
- Class: NGR Class E, SAR Class G
- Number in class: 25
- Numbers: NGR 250-274, SAR 197-221
- Delivered: 1904
- First run: 1904
- Withdrawn: 1962
- The leading coupled axle had flangeless wheels

The South African Railways Class G 4-8-2T of 1904 was a steam locomotive from the pre-Union era in the Colony of Natal.

In 1904, the Natal Government Railways placed 25 Class E 4-8-2T tank steam locomotives in service. In 1912, when these locomotives were assimilated into the South African Railways, they were renumbered and designated Class G.

== Manufacturer ==
The first locomotive to be designed for the Natal Government Railways (NGR) by D.A. Hendrie, who had succeeded G.W. Reid as Locomotive Superintendent of the NGR on 8 January 1903, was a 4-8-2 tank locomotive. It was built by the newly established North British Locomotive Company (NBL) in the former Dübs shops in Glasgow, Scotland.

Twenty-five of these locomotives were delivered in 1904, numbered in the range from 250 to 274. Until they were designated Class E at some stage between 1904 and 1908, they were known on the NGR as the Dübs B or Improved Dübs, even though Dübs and Company had already ceased to exist when the locomotives were built, having been merged into the NBL.

== Characteristics ==
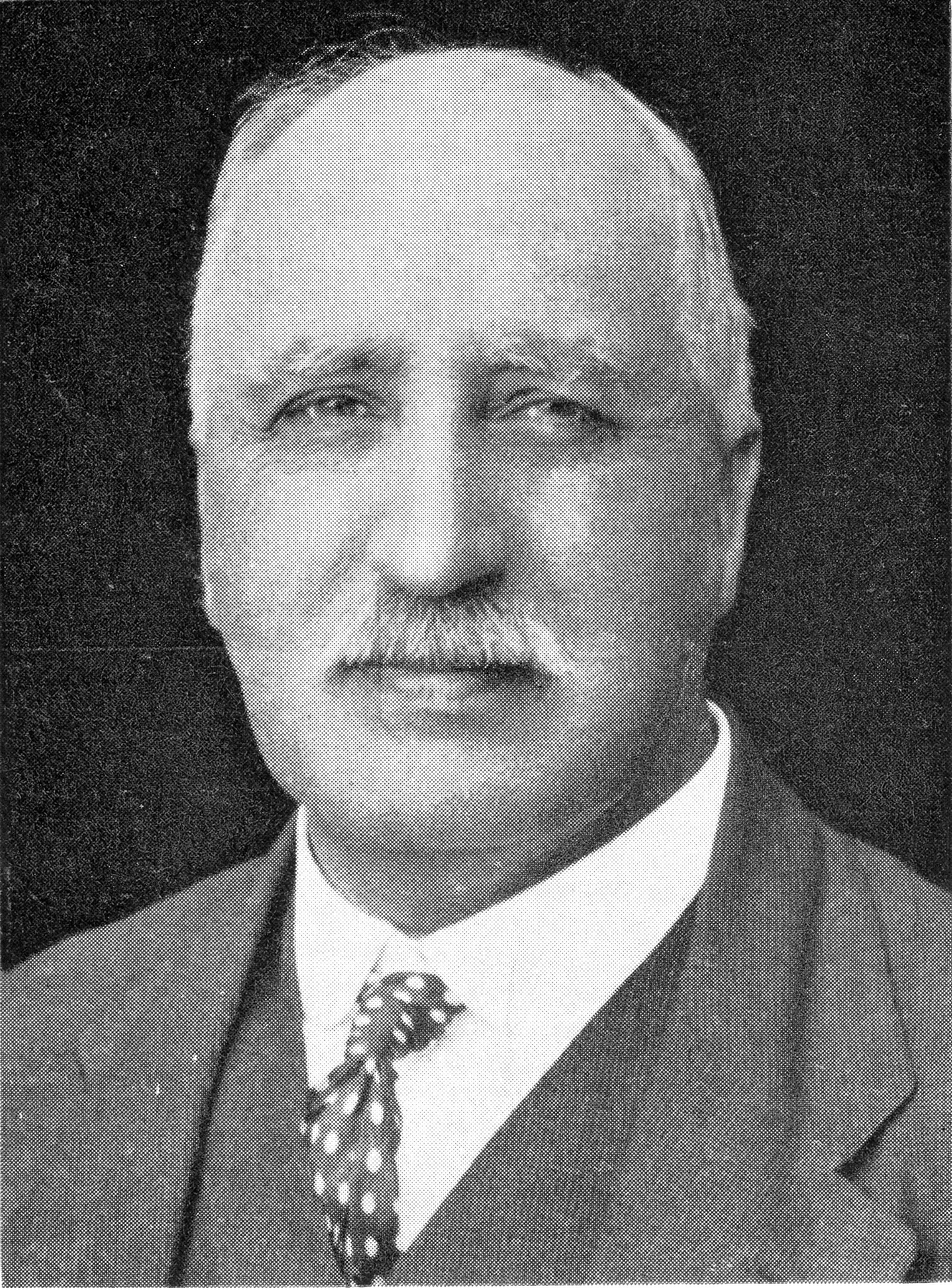
D.A. Hendrie

The locomotive was intended for use on mainline work and Hendrie used the Reid Tenwheeler (NGR Class C) and the Dübs A (NGR Class D) as basis for its design. The result was an engine which looked like a smaller version of the Reid Tenwheeler locomotive. With a larger boiler and working at a higher boiler pressure, the Class E was a more powerful locomotive than the NGR Class D, but Hendrie had made no radical changes in the basic design to the work of his predecessors.

The engine had inclined cylinders, arranged outside the plate frames. Its balanced slide valves were arranged above the cylinders and were actuated by Stephenson link motion through rocker shafts. The locomotives were the first in South Africa to have "H" section coupling rods and connecting rods.

== South African Railways ==
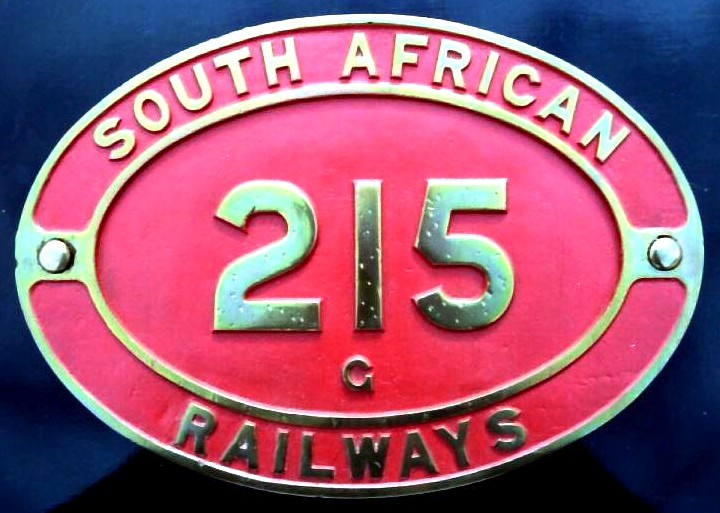

When the Union of South Africa was established on 31 May 1910, the three Colonial government railways (Cape Government Railways, NGR and Central South African Railways) were united under a single administration to control and administer the railways, ports and harbours of the Union. Although the South African Railways and Harbours came into existence in 1910, the actual classification and renumbering of all the rolling stock of the three constituent railways were only implemented with effect from 1 January 1912.

In 1912, these locomotives were designated Class G on the South African Railways (SAR) and renumbered in the range from 197 to 221.

== Service ==
The locomotives entered service working the mainline passenger Corridor Trains out of Durban, but they were soon replaced by the NGR Class B 4-8-0 tender locomotives, Hendrie's second locomotive design, which entered service later in 1904. They were then used as banking engines from Ladysmith up the Van Reenen Pass on the rail connection between Natal and Harrismith in the Orange River Colony. They remained in use there as well as in general service on some of the heavier branch lines until the loads became too heavy for them.

By 1944, six of them were still working in light shunting at various marshalling yards in the Union. The last pair were withdrawn from shunting service around Pietermaritzburg in 1962. Several were sold to mines and other industrial concerns.

== Preservation ==
The last of the Class to be built, ex NGR no. 274, SAR no. 221, was moved from Millsite in Krugersdorp to the Outeniqua Transport Museum in George during August 2014. another G class NLC 2 survives at Witbank Loco Depot.

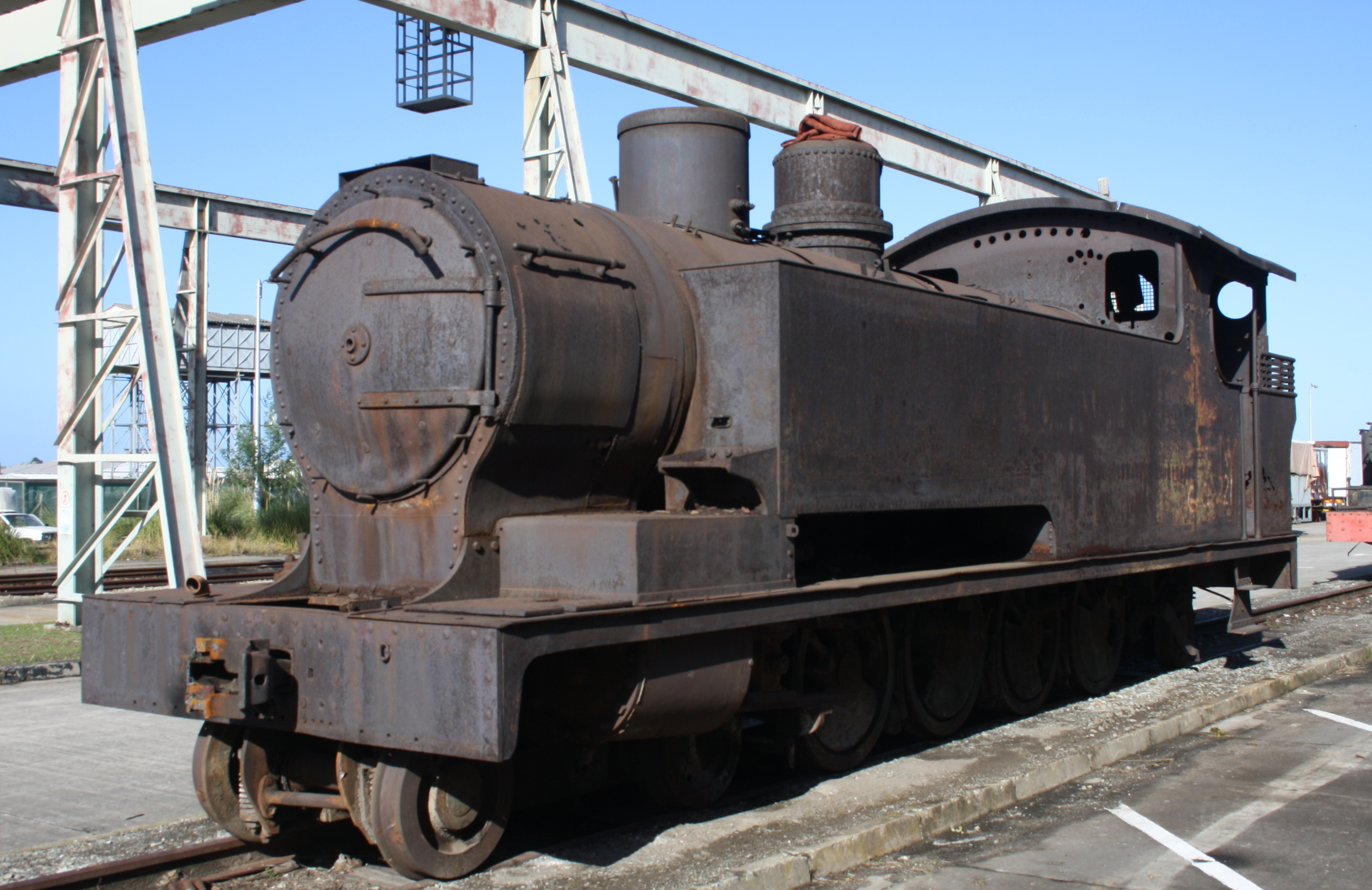
No. 221 upon delivery to the Outeniqua Transport Museum in August 2014
