= South African Class 6L 4-6-0 =

1904 design of steam locomotive

CGR 6th Class 4-6-0 1904 Experimental South African Class 6L 4-6-0
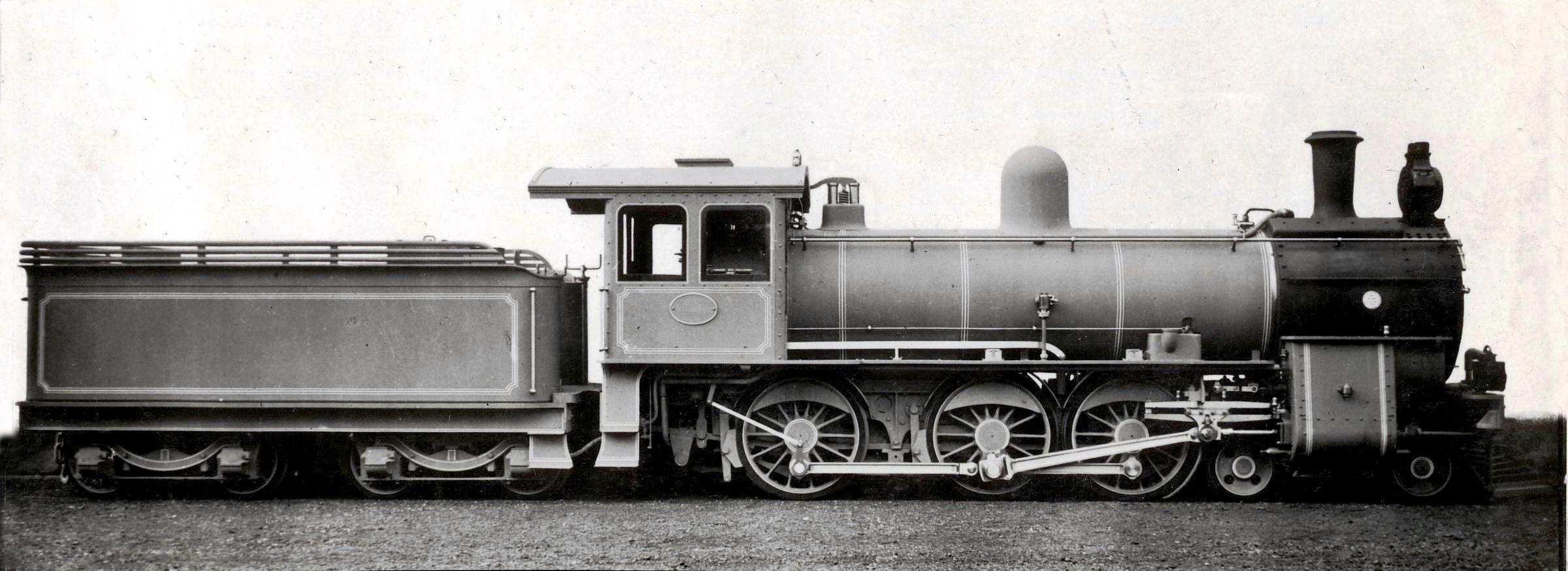
- CGR 6th Class, SAR Class 6L, as built with Schmidt superheater and piston valves
Type and origin
- ♠ – Locomotive with superheater ♥ – Locomotive without superheater
- Power type: Steam
- Designer: Cape Government Railways (H.M. Beatty)
- Builder: North British Locomotive Company
- Serial number: Neilson, Reid 6324 & 6323; NBL 15889 & 15888
- Model: CGR 6th Class
- Build date: 1903
- Total produced: 2
Specifications
- Configuration
  - Whyte: 4-6-0 (Tenwheeler)
  - UIC: ♠ 2'Ch2 – ♥ 2'Cn2
- Driver: 2nd coupled axle
- Gauge: 3 ft 6 in (1,067 mm) Cape gauge
- Leading dia.: 28 1/2 in (724 mm)
- Coupled dia.: 54 in (1,372 mm)
- Tender wheels: 33 1/2 in (851 mm)
- Wheelbase: 45 ft 5 1/2 in (13,856 mm)
  - Axle spacing (Asymmetrical): 1-2: 4 ft 9 in (1,448 mm); 2-3: 6 ft 7 in (2,007 mm)
  - Engine: 21 ft 2 in (6,452 mm)
  - Leading: 6 ft (1,829 mm)
  - Coupled: 11 ft 4 in (3,454 mm)
  - Tender: 15 ft (4,572 mm)
  - Tender bogie: 5 ft (1,524 mm)
- Length
  - Over couplers: 52 ft 3 1/4 in (15,932 mm)
- Height: ♠ 12 ft 10 in (3,912 mm) ♥ 12 ft 8 in (3,861 mm)
- Frame type: Bar
- Axle load: ♠ 13 LT 9 cwt (13,670 kg) ♥ 13 LT 3 cwt (13,360 kg)
  - Leading: ♠ 13 LT 14 cwt (13,920 kg) ♥ 11 LT 15 cwt (11,940 kg)
  - 1st coupled: ♠ 12 LT 8 cwt (12,600 kg) ♥ 12 LT 1 cwt (12,240 kg)
  - 2nd coupled: ♠ 13 LT 9 cwt (13,670 kg) ♥ 12 LT 19 cwt (13,160 kg)
  - 3rd coupled: ♠ 12 LT 16 cwt (13,010 kg) ♥ 13 LT 3 cwt (13,360 kg)
  - Tender bogie: Bogie 1: 17 LT 5 cwt (17,530 kg); Bogie 2: 18 LT 15 cwt (19,050 kg)
- Adhesive weight: ♠ 38 LT 13 cwt (39,270 kg) ♥ 38 LT 3 cwt (38,760 kg)
- Loco weight: ♠ 52 LT 7 cwt (53,190 kg) ♥ 49 LT 18 cwt (50,700 kg)
- Tender weight: 36 LT (36,580 kg)
- Total weight: ♠ 88 LT 7 cwt (89,770 kg) ♥ 85 LT 18 cwt (87,280 kg)
- Tender type: 2-axle bogies
- Fuel type: Coal
- Fuel capacity: 5 LT 10 cwt (5.6 t)
- Water cap.: 3,200 imp gal (14,500 L)
- Firebox
  - Type: Round-top
  - Grate area: ♠♥ 18.75 sq ft (1.742 m^{2})
- Boiler
  - Pitch: ♠♥ 6 ft 11 in (2,108 mm)
  - Diameter: ♠♥ 4 ft 7 in (1,397 mm)
  - Tube plates: ♠♥ 11 ft 2 1/8 in (3,407 mm)
  - Small tubes: ♠ 158: 2 in (51 mm) ♥ 176: 2 in (51 mm)
  - Large tubes: ♠ One: 10 3/4 in (273 mm)
- Boiler pressure: ♠♥ 180 psi (1,241 kPa)
- Safety valve: ♠♥ Ramsbottom
- Heating surface
  - Firebox: ♠ 109.5 sq ft (10.17 m^{2}) ♥ 109 sq ft (10.1 m^{2})
  - Tubes: ♠ 924.87 sq ft (85.923 m^{2}) ♥ 1,030 sq ft (95.690 m^{2})
  - Flues: ♠ 33.75 sq ft (3.135 m^{2})
  - Total surface: ♠ 1,068.12 sq ft (99.232 m^{2}) ♥ 1,139 sq ft (105.817 m^{2})
- Superheater: ♠ Schmidt
- Cylinders: Two
- Cylinder size: ♠ 18 1/2 in (470 mm) bore ♥ 17 1/2 in (444 mm) bore ♠♥ 26 in (660 mm) stroke
- Valve gear: Stephenson
- Valve type: ♠ Piston – ♥ Slide
- Couplers: Johnston link-and-pin
Performance figures
- Tractive effort: ♠ 22,250 lbf (99.0 kN) @ 75% ♥ 19,910 lbf (88.6 kN) @ 75%
Career
- Operators: Cape Government Railways; South African Railways
- Class: CGR 6th Class, SAR Class 6L
- Number in class: 2
- Numbers: CGR 909-910; SAR 659-660
- Delivered: 1904
- First run: 1904
- Withdrawn: 1934

The South African Railways Class 6L 4-6-0 of 1904 was a steam locomotive from the pre-Union era in the Cape of Good Hope.

In 1904, the Cape Government Railways placed its last two 6th Class 4-6-0 bar-framed steam locomotives in service. In 1912, when they were assimilated into the South African Railways, they were renumbered and designated Class 6L.

== Manufacturer ==
The Cape Government Railways (CGR) placed its last order for two 6th Class locomotives with Neilson, Reid and Company in 1903. In that same year, Scottish locomotive builders Sharp, Stewart and Company and Dübs and Company merged with Neilson, Reid to form the North British Locomotive Company (NBL). The two locomotives, Neilson, Reid works numbers 6324 and 6323 and built at the Hyde Park works of the former Neilson, Reid, were therefore delivered with NBL works numbers 15889 and 15888.

== Characteristics ==
The two locomotives in this order were experimental and were the first South African locomotives to be built with superheaters and piston valves with internal admission. Like other second generation 6th Class locomotives with bar frames, they had high running boards with no need for driving wheel fairings. The two locomotives were delivered in 1904, numbered 909 and 910 for the Western System of the CGR.

=== Cylinders ===
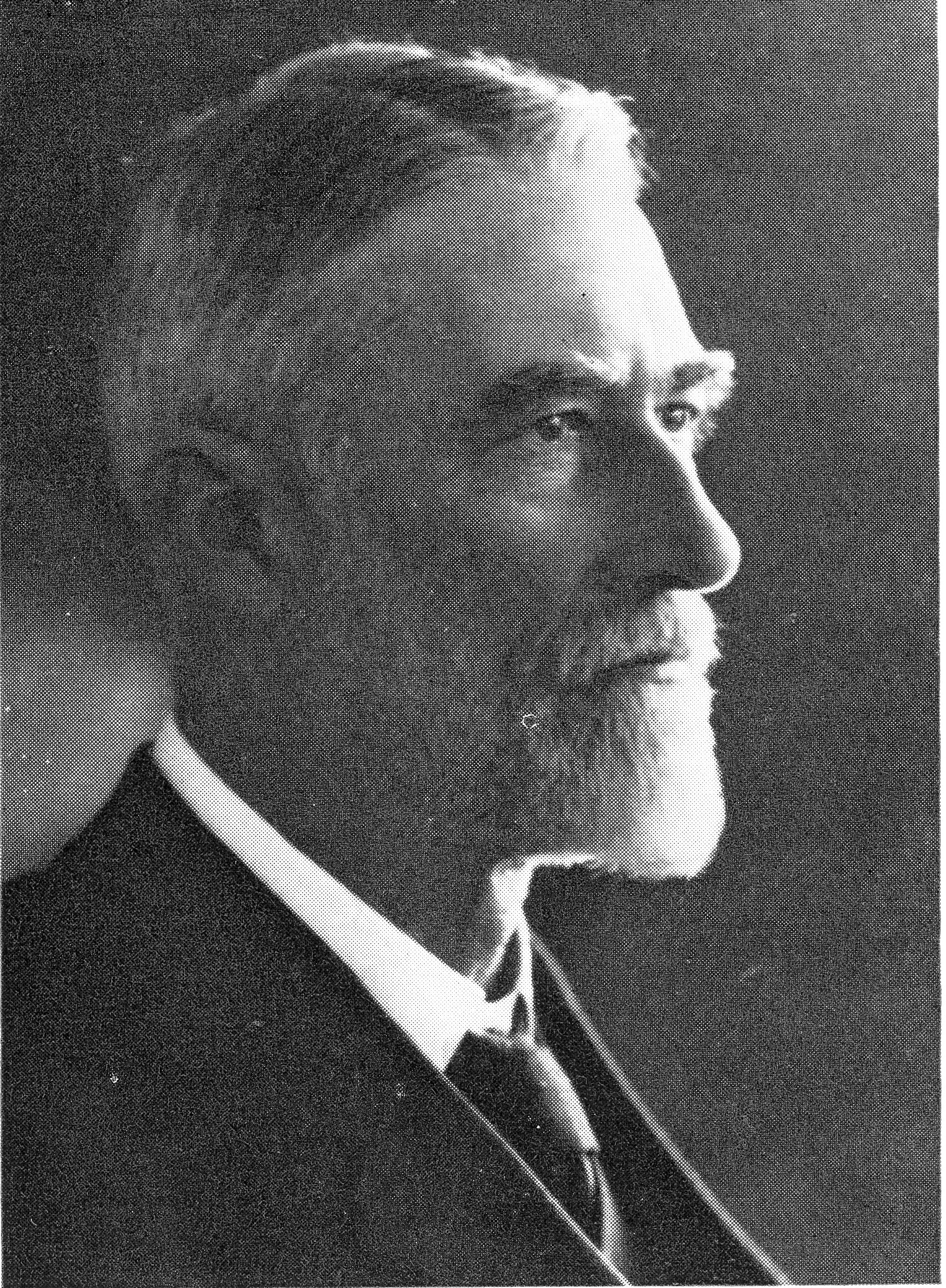
H.M. Beatty

The pistons, with a bore of 18.5 inches (470 millimetres), were the largest yet used on the 6th Class. The piston valves, arranged above the cylinders, were cast iron, 6 inches (152 millimetres) in diameter and actuated by Stephenson Link motion through rocking shafts. The balance weight was replaced by a compression spring encased in a cast-steel cylinder.

A pressure relief valve was fitted to the cylinder covers and snifting valves were fitted to the steam chests. Lubrication of the cylinders and piston valves was by means of a Ritter six-piston oil press, which was arranged in the cab at the right hand side of the engine and actuated from the trailing crank pin.

=== Firebox ===
The boiler barrel was telescopic in form, with the larger diameter adjacent to the firebox. The front portion of the firebox was supported from the shell by means of partial girder stays, fitted with expansion links. The remaining portion was supported by through stays, each partially encased in an iron tube filled with cement. The stays in the sides, the tubeplates and backplate were copper, while the 158 tubes were iron.

=== Schmidt superheater ===
These locomotives were the first engines to be built in Britain with a Schmidt superheater, which was of the smokebox type and consisted of 61 solid drawn-steel tubes. The superheater tubes were encased in a box which was built up of thin steel plates, adapted to the shape of the outer series of tubes, and ended at the steam collector box in two narrow vertical dampers. The whole superheater occupied two-thirds of the total length of the smokebox. To ensure that the superheater tubes received ample heat, a large flue of 10 3/4 inches (273 millimetres) diameter was installed in the lower part of the boiler between the firebox and the front tube plate, where it connected to the casing of the superheater.

The 61 tubes were bent into concentric rings and arranged in vertical planes about 1 inch (25 millimetres) apart, each plane containing alternately two rings and one ring, with the one ring of a diameter intermediate between that of the other two rings. The first nine rings nearest the tubeplate, however, were arched in decreasing radii from the front of the flue to form a chamber between the inner and two outer rings into which the gases from the large flue first passed.

The inner series of tubes were bent up at the ends and expanded into two cast-steel collector boxes, attached to the smokebox on each side of the chimney. The right hand side box was divided into two chambers by a central partition, with half the superheater tubes expanding into each of the chambers. The partition on the tube plate side of this box was connected to the regulator pipe, while the front partition was connected through the steam pipes to the cylinders. The left hand side steam collector box had no partition.

The action of the superheater was simple. Upon opening of the regulator, saturated steam was admitted to the rear chamber of the right hand side steam collector box, from where it passed through the tubes to the left hand side box in a slightly superheated condition. From there it passed back to the front chamber of the right hand side box through the other half of the tubes, and then, in a superheated condition, to the cylinders.

The rate of flow of the gases was controlled by the driver by means of dampers placed at the top of the superheater box. These dampers were connected to the lever to actuate the blower in such a manner that they were automatically closed when the blower was in operation.

In the smokebox, it was necessary to provide a clearing chute beneath the smokebox where the flue joined the casing, to prevent it from becoming clogged with cinders. Just forward of the blast pipe, another chute was installed to clear cinders from the smokebox.

In later superheater designs the superheater elements were passed down the boiler flues.

== Class 6 sub-classes ==
When the Union of South Africa was established on 31 May 1910, the three Colonial government railways (CGR, Natal Government Railways and Central South African Railways) were united under a single administration to control and administer the railways, ports and harbours of the Union. Although the South African Railways and Harbours came into existence in 1910, the actual classification and renumbering of all the rolling stock of the three constituent railways were only implemented with effect from 1 January 1912.

When these two locomotives were assimilated into the SAR in 1912, they were renumbered 659 and 660 and reclassified to Class 6L.

The rest of the CGR's 6th Class locomotives, together with the Central South African Railways (CSAR) Classes 6-L1 to 6-L3 locomotives which had been inherited from the Oranje-Vrijstaat Gouwerment-Spoorwegen (OVGS) via the Imperial Military Railways (IMR), were grouped into thirteen more sub-classes by the SAR. The 4-6-0 locomotives became SAR Classes 6, 6A to 6H, 6J and 6K, the 2-6-2 locomotives became Class 6Y and the 2-6-4 locomotives became Class 6Z.

== Modification ==
The superheater arrangement was extremely complicated and did not prove to be a success. The two engines were comparatively tested against two similar saturated steam locomotives, but did not achieve any appreciable economy. The piston valves were found to be too small in diameter and the additional complications in boiler and smokebox details led to the decision in 1915 to reboiler the two locomotives with boilers similar to those used by the standard Class 6 locomotive, thus converting them to saturated steam locomotives. The piston-valve cylinders were also removed and replaced with smaller 17 1/2 inches (444 millimetres) bore slide-valve cylinders. In this form, the locomotives were practically identical to the bar-framed Class 6J locomotives which had been built by Neilson, Reid and Company in 1902, except that they still had cylinders with a 1/2 inch (13 millimetres) larger bore.

== Service ==
The Class 6 family of locomotives were introduced primarily as passenger locomotives, but when the class became displaced by larger and more powerful locomotive classes, it literally became a Jack-of-all-trades which proved itself as one of the most useful and successful locomotive classes ever to be designed at the Salt River shops. It went on to see service in all parts of the country, except Natal, and was used on all types of traffic.

In SAR service, the two Class 6L locomotives worked on the Cape mainline until they were withdrawn and scrapped in 1934.
