= Der shtral =

Yiddish newspaper in South Africa

- Type: Weekly newspaper
- Editor: Lazarus Manfried
- Founded: 1904
- Language: Yiddish
- Country: South Africa

Der shtral was a weekly Yiddish-language newspaper published in Cape Town, South Africa in 1904. Lazarus Manfried was the editor and publisher of the newspaper.
