= South African Class F 4-6-4T =

1904 design of steam locomotive

CSAR Class F 4-6-4T South African Class F 4-6-4T
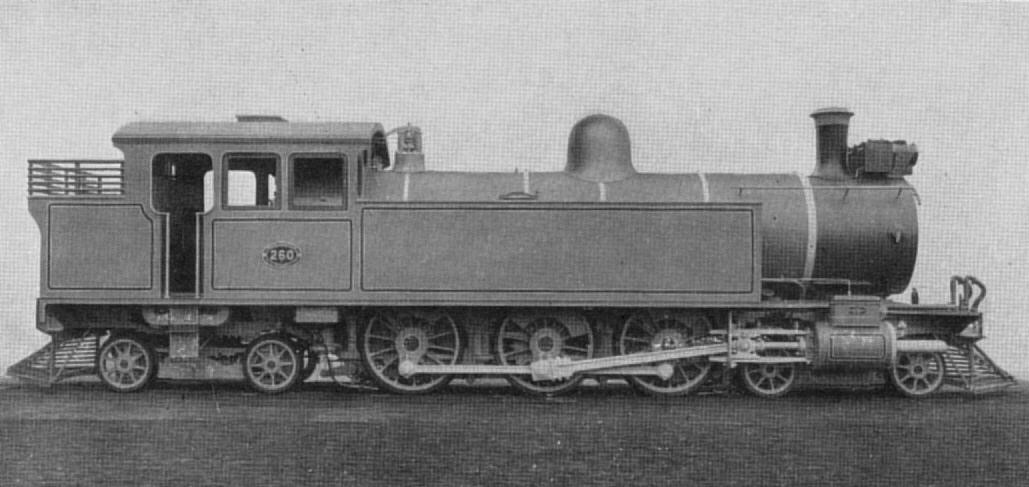
- CSAR Class F no. 260, SAR Class F no. 78
Type and origin
- Power type: Steam
- Designer: Central South African Railways (P.A. Hyde)
- Builder: Vulcan Foundry
- Serial number: 1908–1915
- Model: CSAR Class F
- Build date: 1904
- Total produced: 8
Specifications
- Configuration
  - Whyte: 4-6-4T (Baltic)
  - UIC: 2'C2'n2t
- Driver: 2nd coupled axle
- Gauge: 3 ft 6 in (1,067 mm) Cape gauge
- Leading dia.: 30 in (762 mm)
- Coupled dia.: 54 in (1,372 mm)
- Trailing dia.: 30 in (762 mm)
- Wheelbase: 34 ft 1 in (10,389 mm)
  - Axle spacing (Asymmetrical): 1-2: 5 ft 3 in (1,600 mm); 2-3: 5 ft 9 in (1,753 mm)
  - Leading: 6 ft 4 in (1,930 mm)
  - Coupled: 11 ft (3,353 mm)
  - Trailing: 6 ft 4 in (1,930 mm)
- Length
  - Over couplers: 41 ft 5 3/4 in (12,643 mm)
- Height: 12 ft 7 9/16 in (3,850 mm)
- Frame type: Bar
- Axle load: 13 LT (13,210 kg)
  - Leading: 18 LT 14 cwt (19,000 kg)
  - Coupled: 13 LT (13,210 kg)
  - Trailing: 21 LT 6 cwt (21,640 kg)
- Adhesive weight: 39 LT (39,630 kg)
- Loco weight: 79 LT (80,270 kg)
- Fuel type: Coal
- Fuel capacity: 3 LT (3.0 t)
- Water cap.: 1,800 imp gal (8,180 L)
- Firebox
  - Type: Round-top
  - Grate area: 21.75 sq ft (2.021 m^{2})
- Boiler
  - Pitch: 7 ft 1/2 in (2,146 mm)
  - Diameter: 5 ft (1,524 mm)
  - Tube plates: 12 ft 7 in (3,835 mm)
  - Small tubes: 205: 2 in (51 mm)
- Boiler pressure: 200 psi (1,379 kPa)
- Safety valve: Ramsbottom
- Heating surface
  - Firebox: 131 sq ft (12.2 m^{2})
  - Tubes: 1,350 sq ft (125 m^{2})
  - Total surface: 1,481 sq ft (137.6 m^{2})
- Cylinders: Two
- Cylinder size: 18 in (457 mm) bore 26 in (660 mm) stroke
- Valve gear: Stephenson
- Couplers: Johnston link-and-pin
Performance figures
- Tractive effort: 23,410 lbf (104.1 kN) @ 75%
Career
- Operators: Central South African Railways; South African Railways
- Class: Class F
- Number in class: 8
- Numbers: CSAR 260-267, SAR 78-85
- Nicknames: Chocolate Box
- Delivered: 1904
- First run: 1904
- Withdrawn: 1931

The South African Railways Class F 4-6-4T of 1904 was a steam locomotive from the pre-Union era in Transvaal Colony.

In 1904, the Central South African Railways placed eight Class F tank steam locomotives with a 4-6-4 Baltic type wheel arrangement in service. In 1912, when these locomotives were assimilated into the South African Railways, they were renumbered but retained their Class F classification.

== Manufacturer ==
The first two locomotive types to be designed for the Central South African Railways (CSAR) by P.A. Hyde, who had been appointed as Chief Locomotive Superintendent of the CSAR upon its inception on 1 July 1902, were placed in service in 1904. These were the Class 9 Pacific type passenger locomotive and the Class F 4-6-4 Baltic type tank steam locomotive.

Orders for these two classes were placed simultaneously with Vulcan Foundry of Newton-le-Willows in England. The eight Class F locomotives were delivered in 1904, numbered in the range from 260 to 267.

== Characteristics ==
Since the Class F and the Class 9 were designed and built simultaneously, there were many similarities between them. Apart from the tank locomotive's slightly smaller coupled wheels of 54 inches (1,372 millimetres) diameter compared to 57 inches (1,448 millimetres) on the Class 9, many parts were made interchangeable, including their boilers, cylinders and valve motion. They had bar frames, Stephenson valve gear and used saturated steam.

The locomotive had electric headlights, powered by a steam turbine and generator which were fitted between the chimney and the headlight on top of the smokebox.

In common with the CSAR's Classes 8 and 9, the Class F suffered from fractures in the bar frames, particularly between the cylinders and the leading coupled wheels. The problem was overcome by fitting 1/2 inch (13 millimetres) thick flitch plates on each side of the frame at this point.

== Renumbering ==
When the Union of South Africa was established on 31 May 1910, the three Colonial government railways (Cape Government Railways, Natal Government Railways and CSAR) were united under a single administration to control and administer the railways, ports and harbours of the Union. Although the South African Railways and Harbours came into existence in 1910, the actual classification and renumbering of all the rolling stock of the three constituent railways were only implemented with effect from 1 January 1912.

In 1912, these locomotives retained their Class F designation, but were renumbered in the range from 78 to 85.

== Service ==
At the time when the Class F locomotives were ordered, the suburban services on the Reef were being worked by 46 Tonner Class B tank locomotives which had been inherited from the Nederlandsche-Zuid-Afrikaansche Spoorweg-Maatschappij (NZASM) via the Imperial Military Railways (IMR). Since the loads were fast becoming too heavy for them, the Class F was designed and ordered as a replacement, intended for the suburban passenger services between Springs and Randfontein.

Hyde considered the Class F and the Class 9 as two of his most successful designs for the CSAR. The tank locomotives were very attractive in appearance, with double red lining on their black livery. The IMR tradition of polished copper-capped chimneys, brass domes and boiler bands was continued on the CSAR. The locomotives were always maintained in immaculate condition while in service and became affectionately known as the Chocolate Boxes.

The last of the Class F was withdrawn from service by 1931.

== Illustration ==
The main picture is a Vulcan Foundry builder's photograph of Class F no. 260. The following pictures show the locomotive in service.

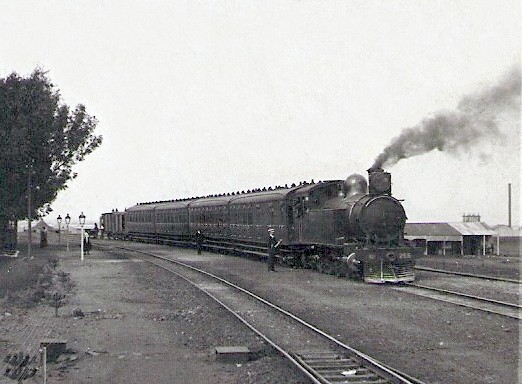
CSAR Class F no. 266, SAR no. 84, on a suburban, c. 1910

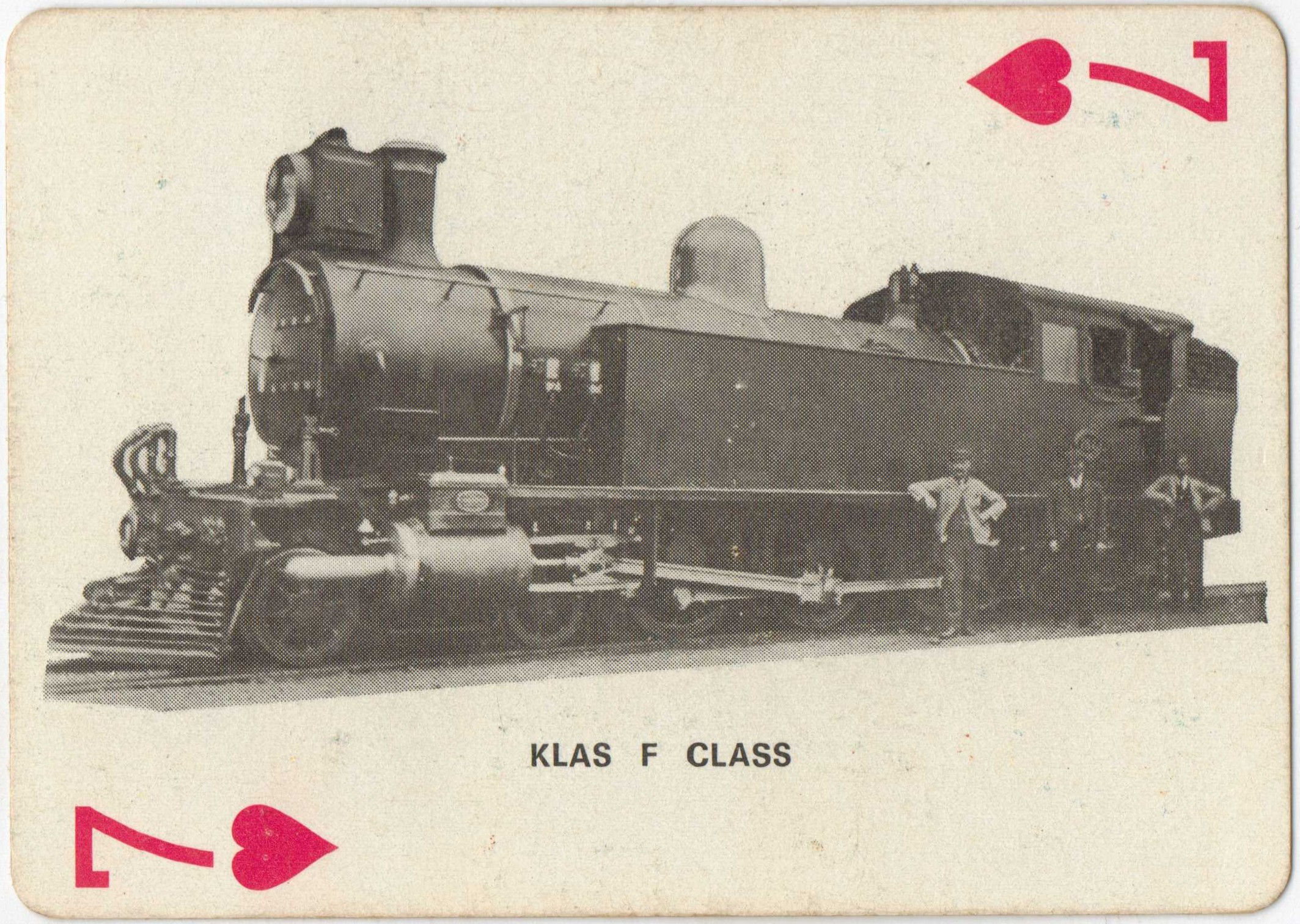
SAR Class F no. 81, as depicted on a SAR Museum Playing Card
