= Johannesburg =

Largest city in South Africa

Johannesburg: Xhosa: eGoli; Zulu: iGoli; Tsonga: Joni; Khoekhoe: !Huni ǁhÄb
- City
- City of Johannesburg
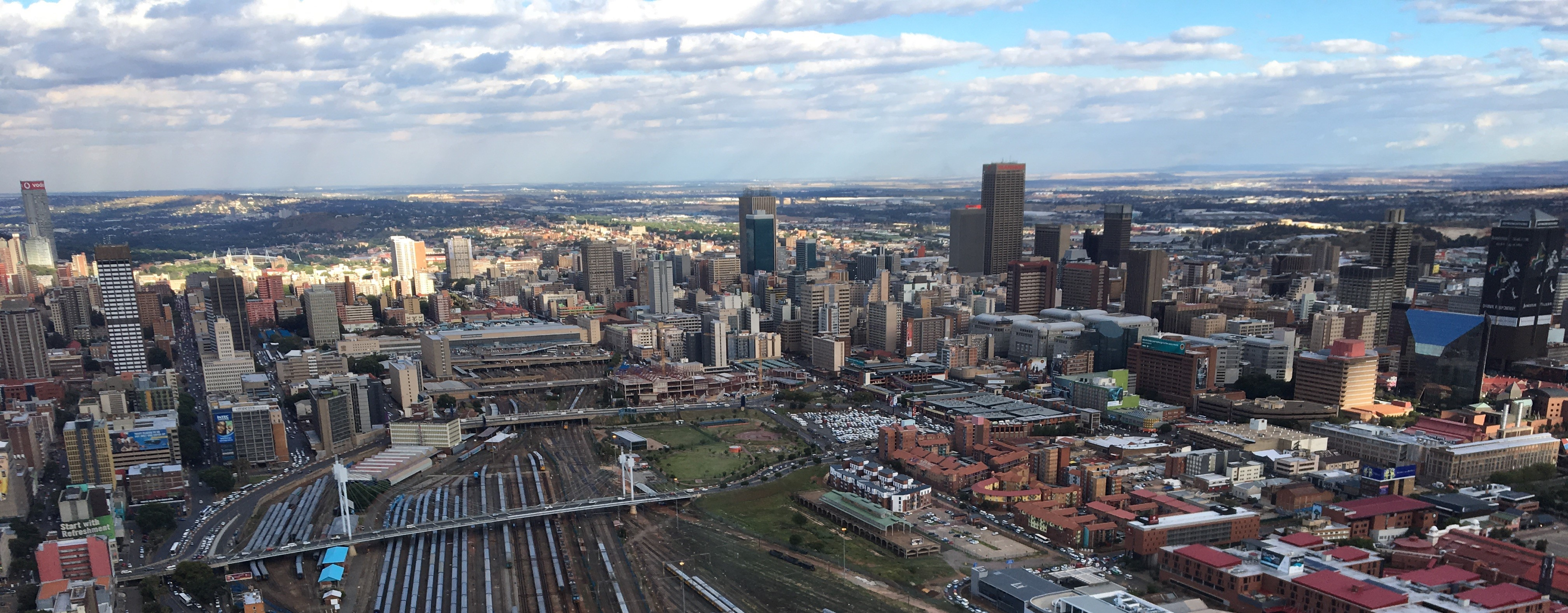
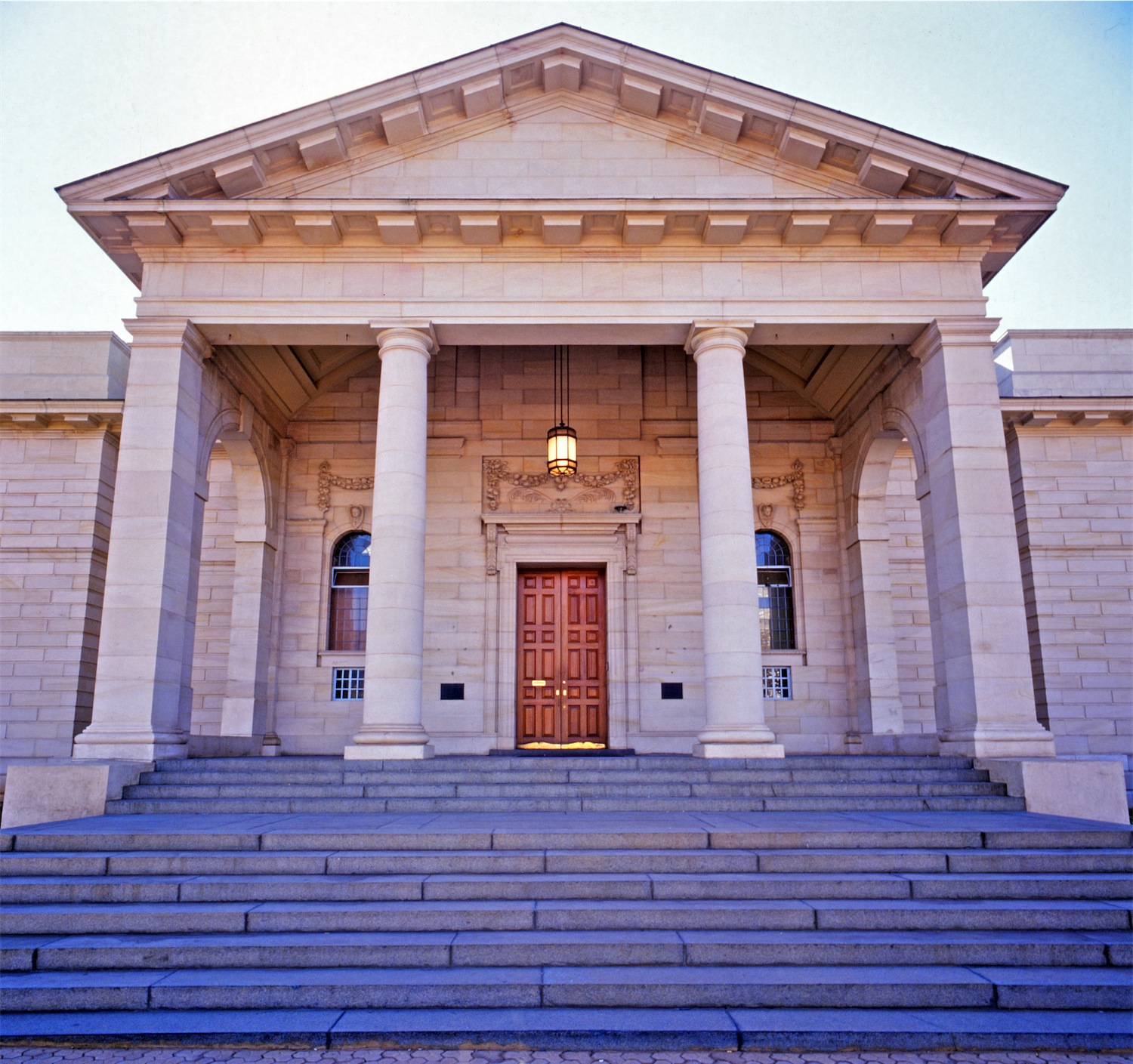
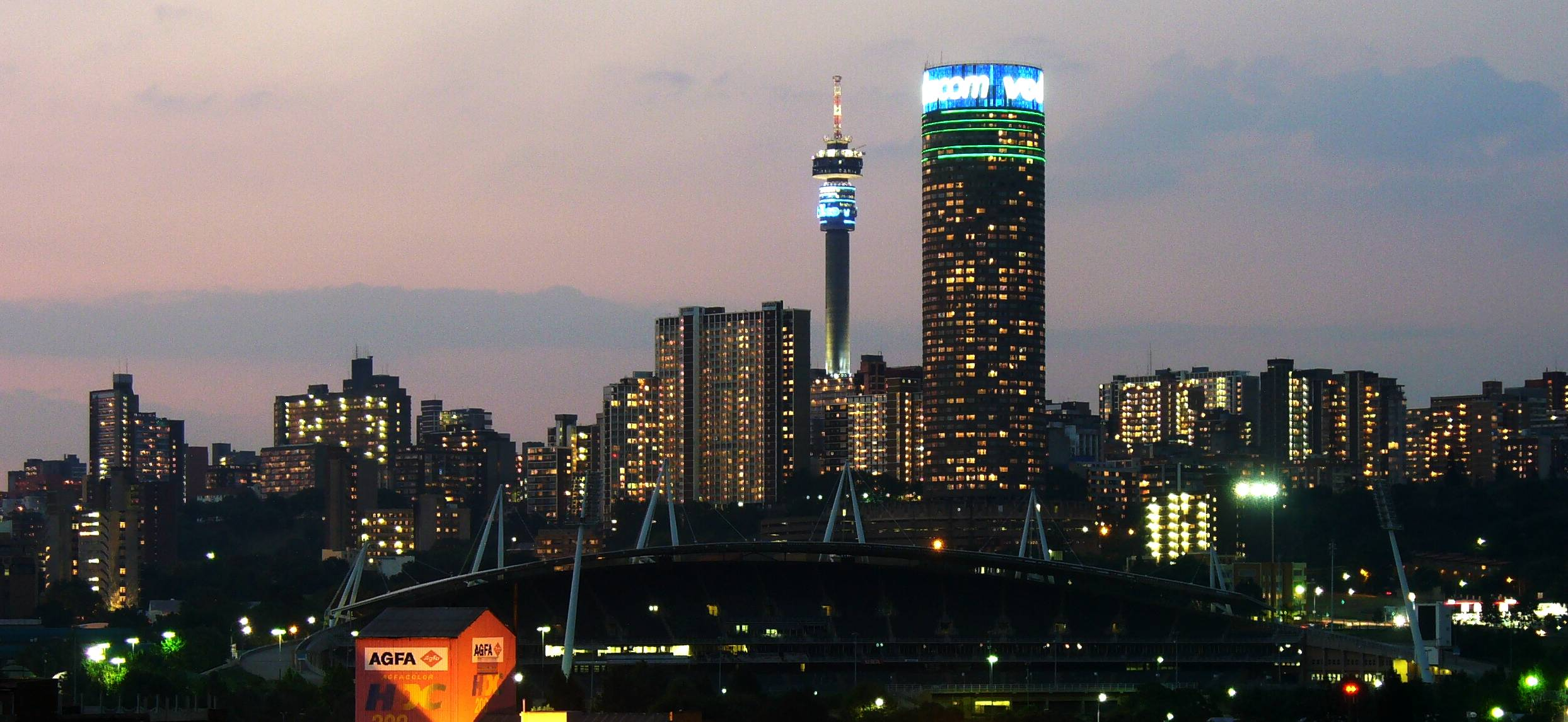
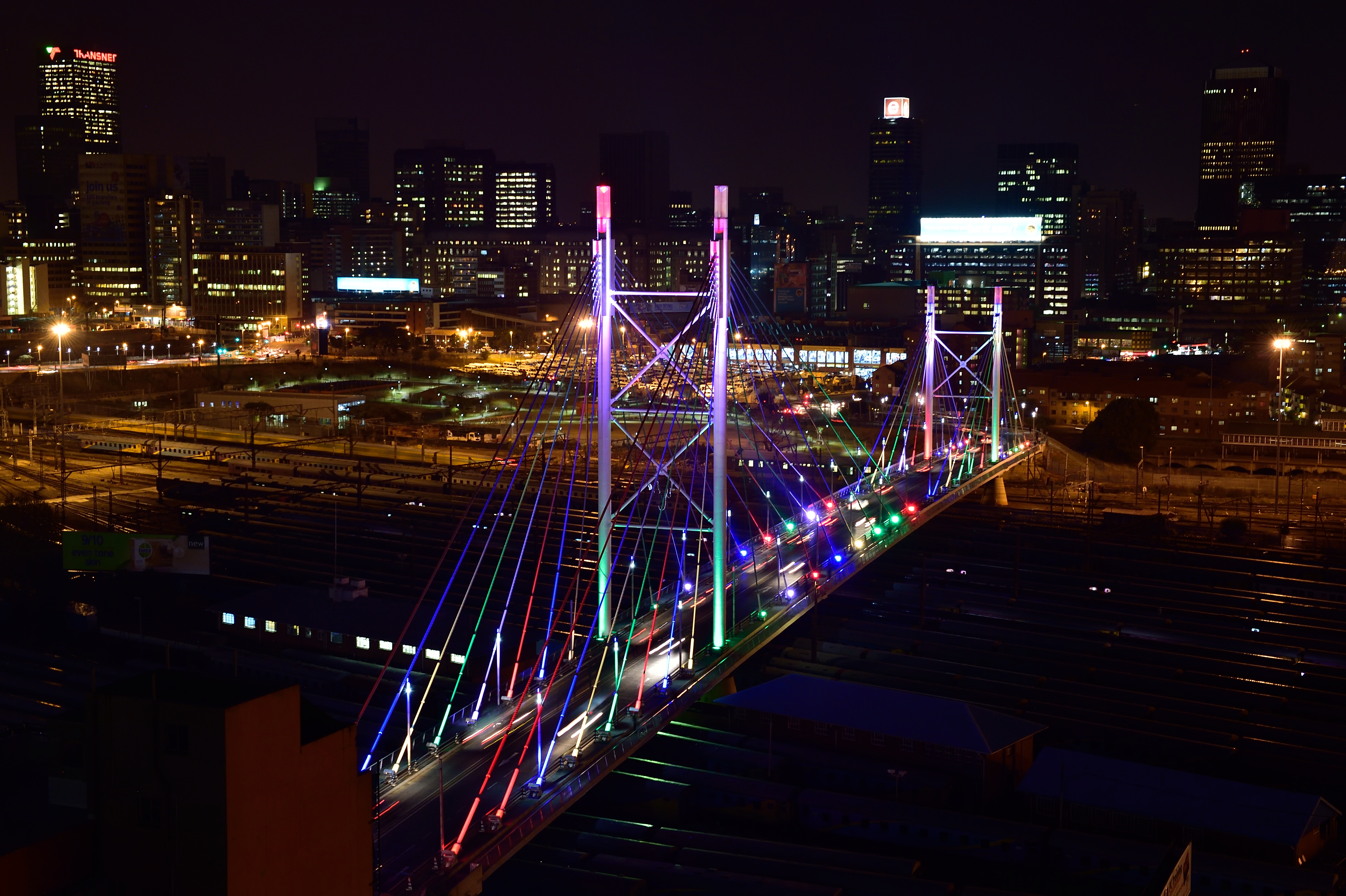
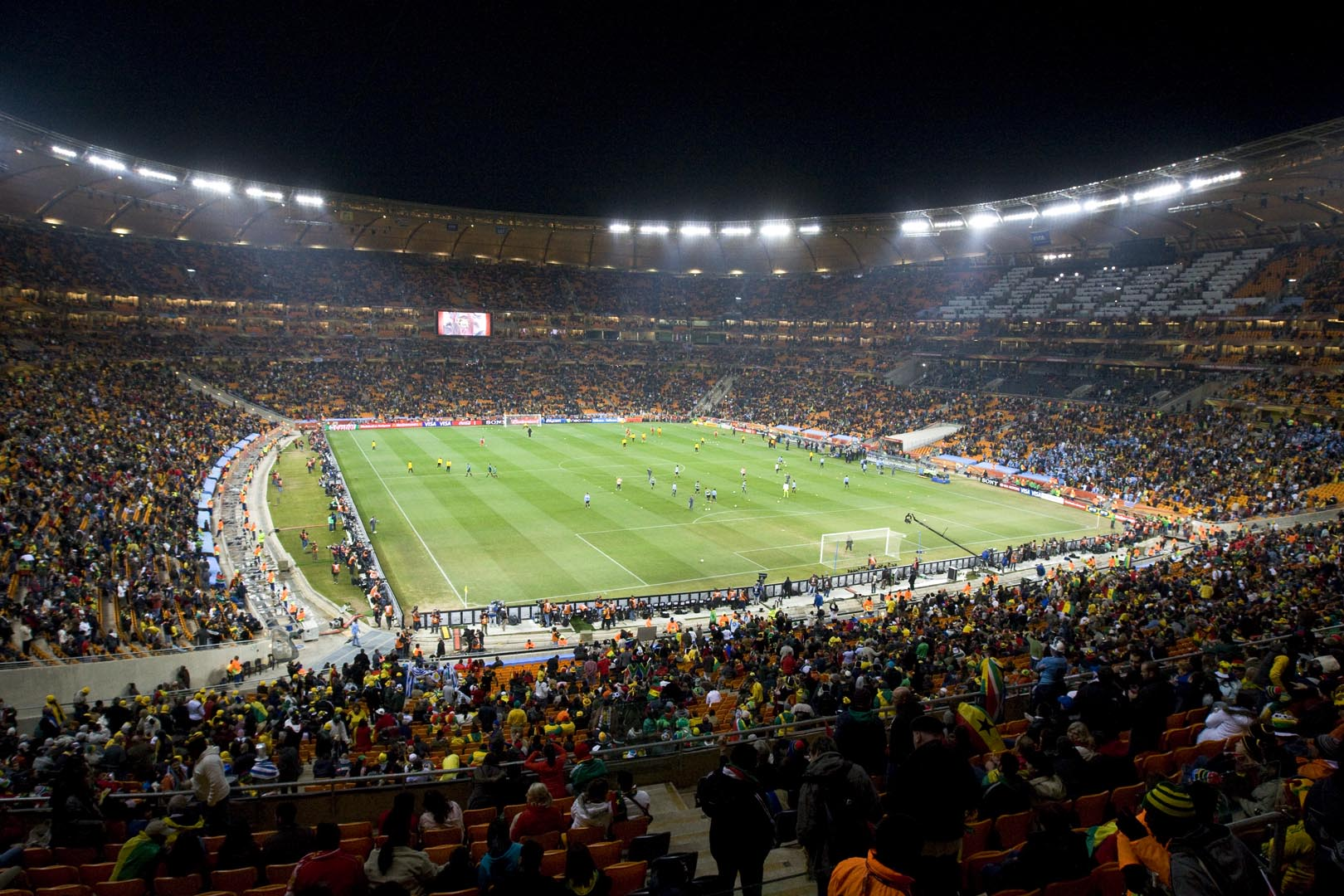
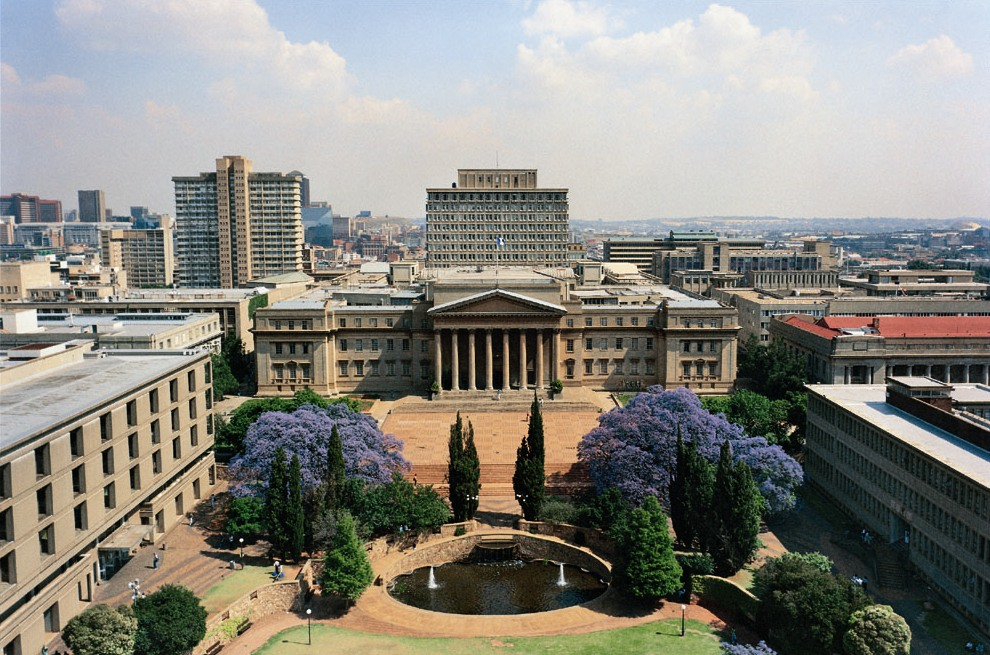
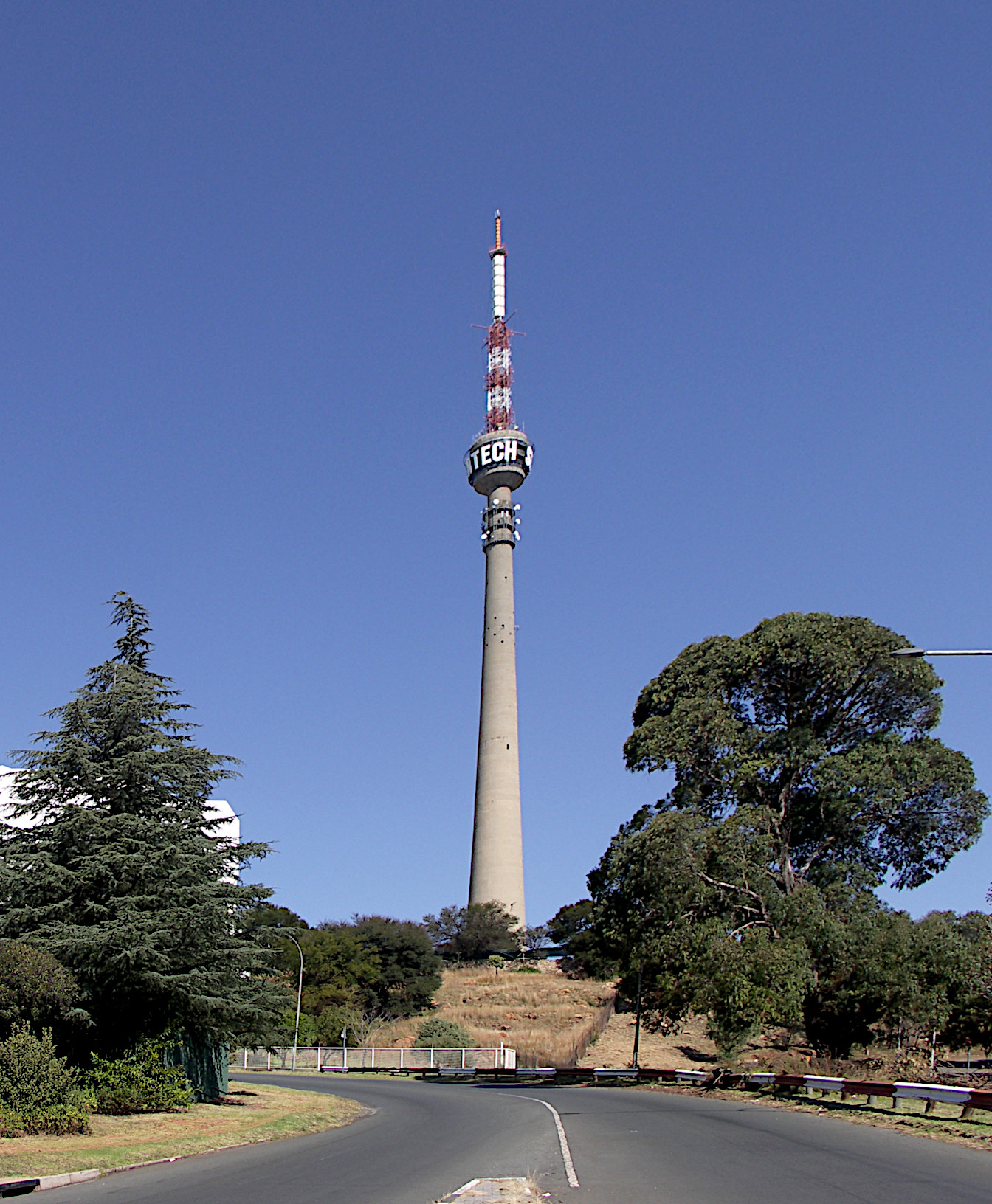
- Johannesburg CBD Johannesburg Art Gallery Hillbrow Tower and Ponte City Nelson Mandela Bridge FNB Stadium University of the Witwatersrand Brixton Tower

- Flag Coat of arms
- Nicknames: Jo'burg; Jozi; Joni (Tsonga version), Muḓi Mulila Ngoma (Venda version); Jobhag (Bhojpuri version); eGoli ("Place of Gold"); Gauteng ("Place of Gold")
- Motto: "Service with Pride"
- Interactive map of Johannesburg
- Location within Gauteng Location within South Africa Location within Africa
- Coordinates: 26°12′16″S 28°2′44″E
- Country: South Africa
- Province: Gauteng
- Municipality: City of Johannesburg
- Established: 1886; 140 years ago

Government
  - Type: Metropolitan municipality
  - Mayor: Dada Morero (ANC)
  - Deputy Mayor: Loyiso Masuku (ANC)

Area
  - City: 334.81 km^{2} (129.27 sq mi)
  - Metro: 1,642.6 km^{2} (634.2 sq mi)
- Elevation: 1,753 m (5,751 ft)

Population (2022)
  - City: 957,441
  - Rank: 8th in Africa; 1st in South Africa
  - Density: 2,859.7/km^{2} (7,406.5/sq mi)
  - Metro: 4,803,262
  - Metro density: 2,924.2/km^{2} (7,573.6/sq mi)
- Demonym: Joburger

Racial makeup (2019)
  - Black African: 76.4%
  - White: 12.3%
  - Coloured: 5.6%
  - Indian/Asian: 4.9%
  - Other: 0.8%

First languages (2011)
  - Zulu: 23.41%
  - English: 20.10%
  - Sesotho: 9.61%
  - Setswana: 7.68%
  - Afrikaans: 7.28%
  - Other: 18.10%
- Time zone: UTC+2 (SAST)
- Postal code (street): 2001
- PO box: 2000
- Area code: 010 and 011
- HDI: ▲0.75 High (2012)
- GDP: US$131 billion (2020)
- GDP per capita (PPP): US$16 370 (2014)
- Website: www.joburg.org.za

Johannesburg (/dʒoʊˈhænɪsbɜːrɡ/ joh-HAN-iss-burg, US also /-ˈhɑːn-/ -HAHN-, Afrikaans: [jʊəˈɦanəsbœrχ]; Xhosa: eGoli [ɛˈɡɔːli]; Zulu: iGoli [îˈɡóːli]), colloquially known as Jozi, Joburg, or "the City of Gold", is the capital city of the province of Gauteng and the largest city in South Africa. In 2022 (the year of the most recent census), the City of Johannesburg Metropolitan Municipality had a population of 4,803,262, and had a wider metropolitan area of 15,099,422, making it one of the 100 largest urban areas in the world. Despite not being the country’s official judicial capital (Bloemfontein), it is the seat of the country's highest court, the Constitutional Court. Situated on the mineral-rich Witwatersrand, the city has long been at the epicentre of the international mineral and gold trade. The richest city in Africa by GDP and private wealth, Johannesburg functions as the economic capital of South Africa and is home to the continent's largest stock exchange, the Johannesburg Stock Exchange.

Johannesburg was established in 1886, following the discovery of gold, on what was once farmland. Within a decade, the population surged to over 100,000, driven by the large gold deposits found along the Witwatersrand. Modern Johannesburg is an amalgamation of formerly separate cities, townships and settlements, reflecting apartheid-era spatial segregation policies. Soweto ("South-Western Townships"), designated a "blacks only" city until 1994, is one of the most historically significant areas for modern South Africa. Home to key anti-apartheid leaders, including Nelson Mandela and Desmond Tutu, it became the epicenter of the 1976 Soweto Uprising, where peaceful student protests were met with brutal force. In contrast, Lenasia is predominantly populated by English-speaking Indo-South Africans (people of Indian and South Asian descent). Formerly "white-only" areas include Sandton, known as "Africa's richest square-mile", Randburg and Roodeport.

== Etymology ==
Controversy surrounds the origin of the name. There were quite a number of people with the name "Johannes" who were involved in the early history of the city. Among them was the principal clerk attached to the office of the surveyor-general Hendrik Dercksen, Christiaan Johannes Joubert, who was a member of the Volksraad and was the Republic's chief of mining. Another was Stephanus Johannes Paulus Kruger (better known as Paul Kruger), president of the South African Republic (ZAR) from 1883 to 1900. Johannes Meyer, the first government official in the area, is another possibility.

Precise records for the choice of name were lost. Johannes Rissik and Johannes Joubert were members of a delegation sent to England to obtain mining rights for the area. Joubert had a park in the city named after him, and Rissik has his name for one of the main streets in the city where the historically important, albeit dilapidated, Rissik Street Post Office is located. The City Hall is also located on Rissik Street.

== History ==
The region surrounding Johannesburg was originally inhabited by San hunter-gatherers who used stone tools. There is evidence that they lived there up to ten centuries ago.

By the mid-18th century, the broader region was largely settled by various Sotho–Tswana communities (one linguistic branch of Bantu-speakers), whose villages, towns, chiefdoms and kingdoms stretched from the Bechuanaland Protectorate (what is now Botswana) in the west, to present day Lesotho in the south, to the present day Pedi areas of the Limpopo Province. More specifically, the stone-walled ruins of Sotho–Tswana towns and villages are scattered around the parts of the former Transvaal province in which Johannesburg is situated.

Many Sotho–Tswana towns and villages in the areas around Johannesburg were destroyed and their people driven away during the wars emanating from Zululand during the late 18th and early 19th centuries (the mfecane or difaqane wars), and as a result, an offshoot of the Zulu kingdom, the Ndebele (often referred to as the Matabele, the name given them by the local Sotho–Tswana), set up a kingdom to the northwest of Johannesburg around modern-day Rustenburg.

=== Gold rush and naming of the city ===
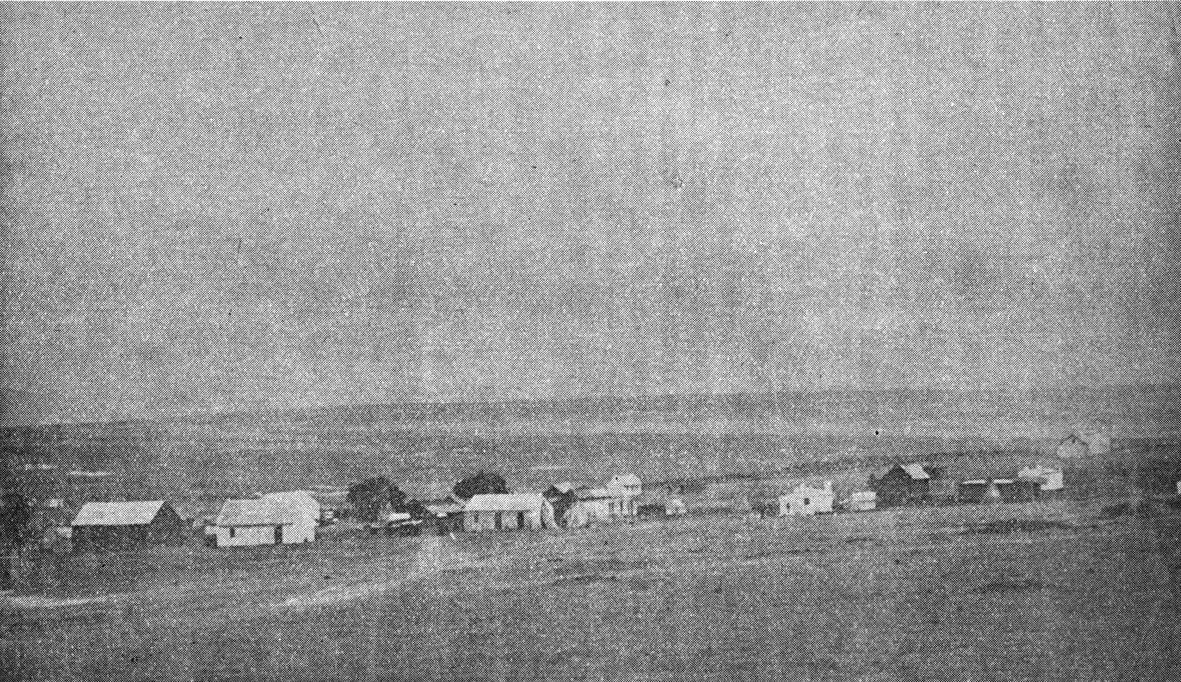
The Langlaagte farm near Paarlshoop, on the Witwatersrand – site of the first discovery of gold in 1886.

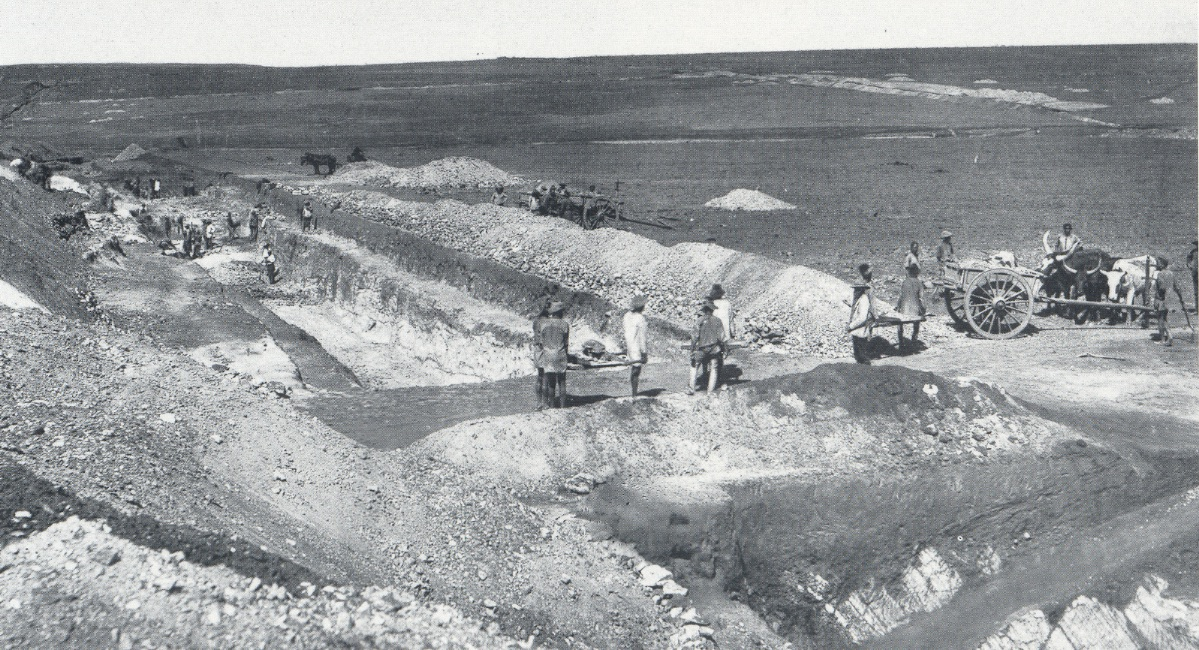
Ferreirasdorp gold mine in 1886, the oldest part of Johannesburg and where the first gold diggers initially settled.

The main Witwatersrand gold reef was discovered in June 1884 on the farm Vogelstruisfontein by Jan Gerritse Bantjes, son of Jan Bantjes. This triggered the Witwatersrand Gold Rush and the founding of Johannesburg in 1886. The discovery of gold rapidly attracted people to the area, making necessary a name and governmental organisation for the area. Jan, Johan and Johannes were common male names among the Dutch of that time; two men involved in surveying the area for the best location of the city, Christian Johannes Joubert and Johann Rissik, are considered the source of the name by some. Johannes Meyer, the first government official in the area is another possibility. Precise records for the choice of name were lost. Within ten years, the city of Johannesburg included 100,000 people.

In September 1884, the Struben brothers discovered the Confidence Reef on the farm Wilgespruit near present-day Roodepoort, which further boosted excitement over gold prospects. The first gold to be crushed on the Witwatersrand was the gold-bearing rock from the Bantjes mine crushed using the Struben brothers stamp machine. News of the discovery soon reached Kimberley and directors Cecil Rhodes and Sir Joseph Robinson rode up to investigate the rumours for themselves. They were guided to the Bantjes camp with its tents strung out over several kilometres and stayed with Bantjes for two nights.

In 1884, they purchased the first pure refined gold from Bantjes for £3,000. Incidentally, Bantjes had from 1881 been operating the Kromdraai Gold Mine in the Cradle of Humankind together with his partner Johannes Stephanus Minnaar where they first discovered gold in 1881, and which also offered another kind of discovery—the early ancestors of all mankind. Some report Australian George Harrison as the first to make a claim for gold in the area that became Johannesburg, as he found gold on a farm in July 1886. He did not remain in the area.

On 3 October 1886 the name Johannesburg was first used. Surveyor Jos de Villiers surveyed Johannesburg's first neighborhood, Randjeslaagte, between 19 October and 3 November that year.

Gold was earlier discovered some 400 kilometres (249 miles) to the east of present-day Johannesburg in Barberton. Gold prospectors soon discovered the richer gold reefs of the Witwatersrand offered by Bantjes. The original miners' camp, under the informal leadership of Col Ignatius Ferreira, was located in the Fordsburg dip, possibly because water was available there, and because of the site's proximity to the diggings. Following the establishment of Johannesburg, the area was taken over by the Transvaal government who had it surveyed and named it Ferreira's Township, today the suburb of Ferreirasdorp. The first settlement at Ferreira's Camp was established as a tented camp and which soon reached a population of 3,000 by 1887. The government took over the camp, surveyed it and named it Ferreira's Township. By 1896, Johannesburg was established as a city of over 100,000 inhabitants, one of the fastest growing cities ever.

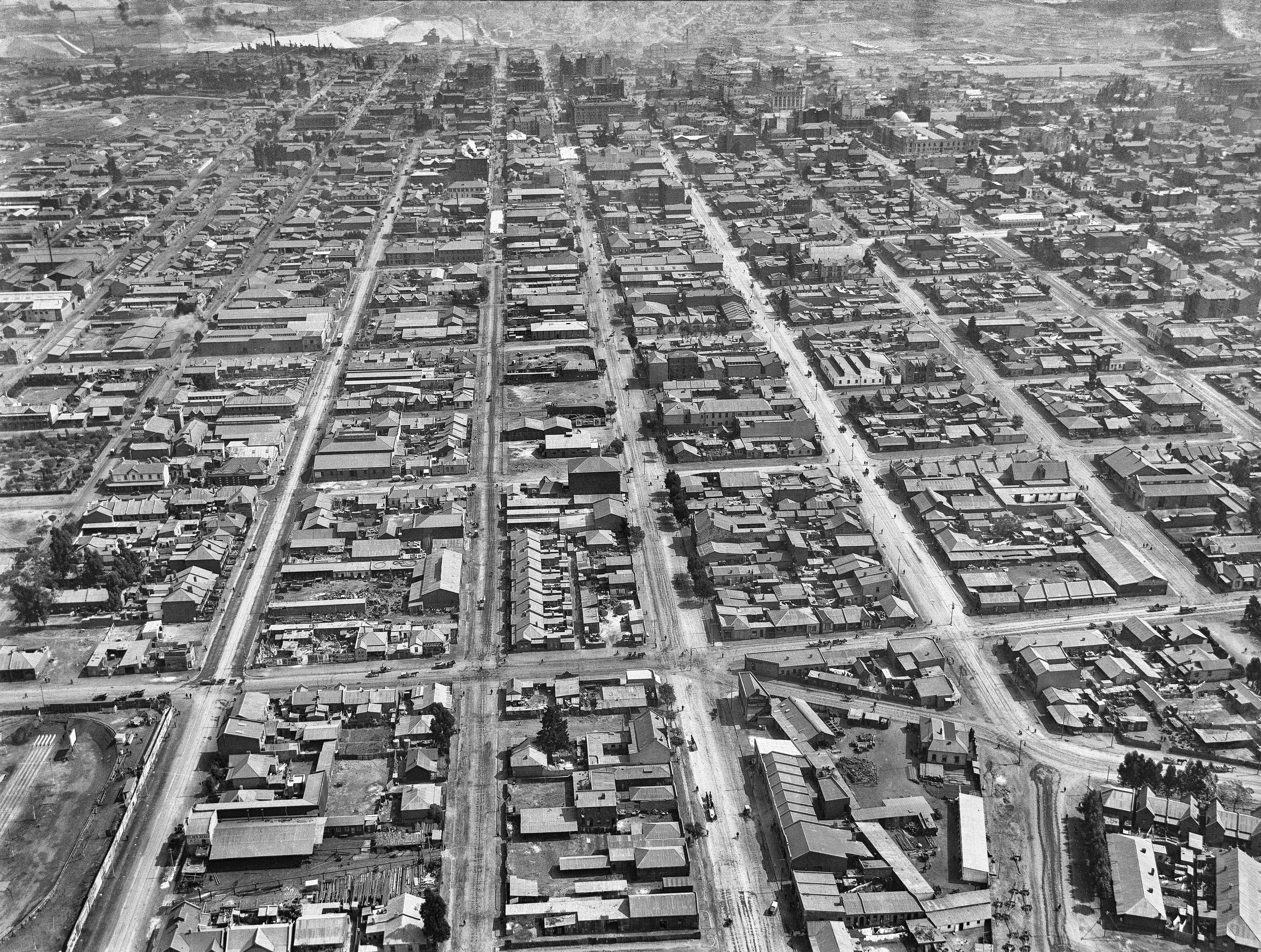
Part of the batch of the first commercial aerial photographs of South Africa, showing Johannesburg, captured from a balloon by Swiss photographer and balloonist Spelterini (1911). In the background goldmining activity can be seen.

Mines near Johannesburg are among the deepest in the world, with some as deep as 4,000 metres (13,000 ft).

=== Rapid growth, Jameson Raid and the Second Boer War ===
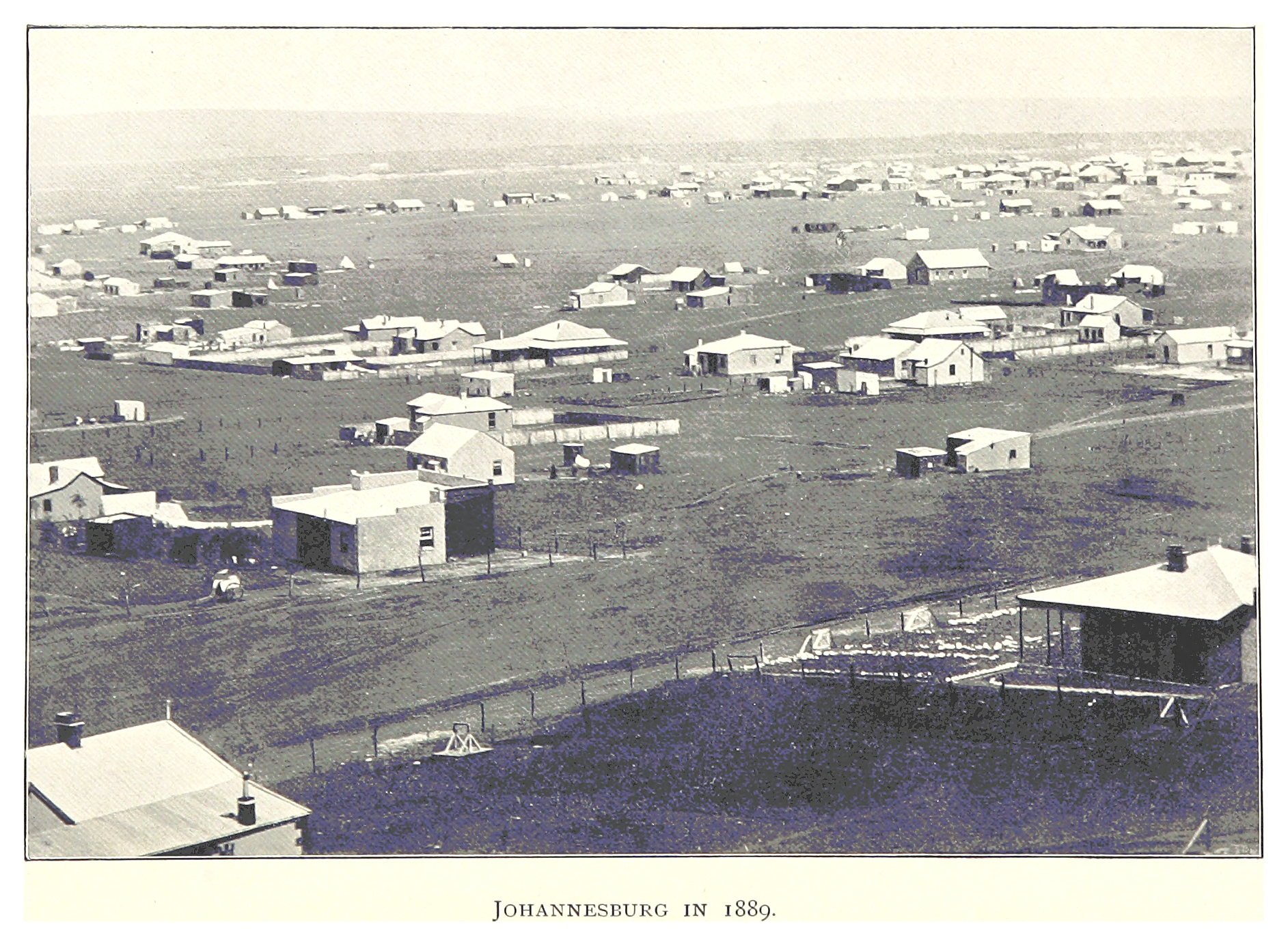
Johannesburg in 1889

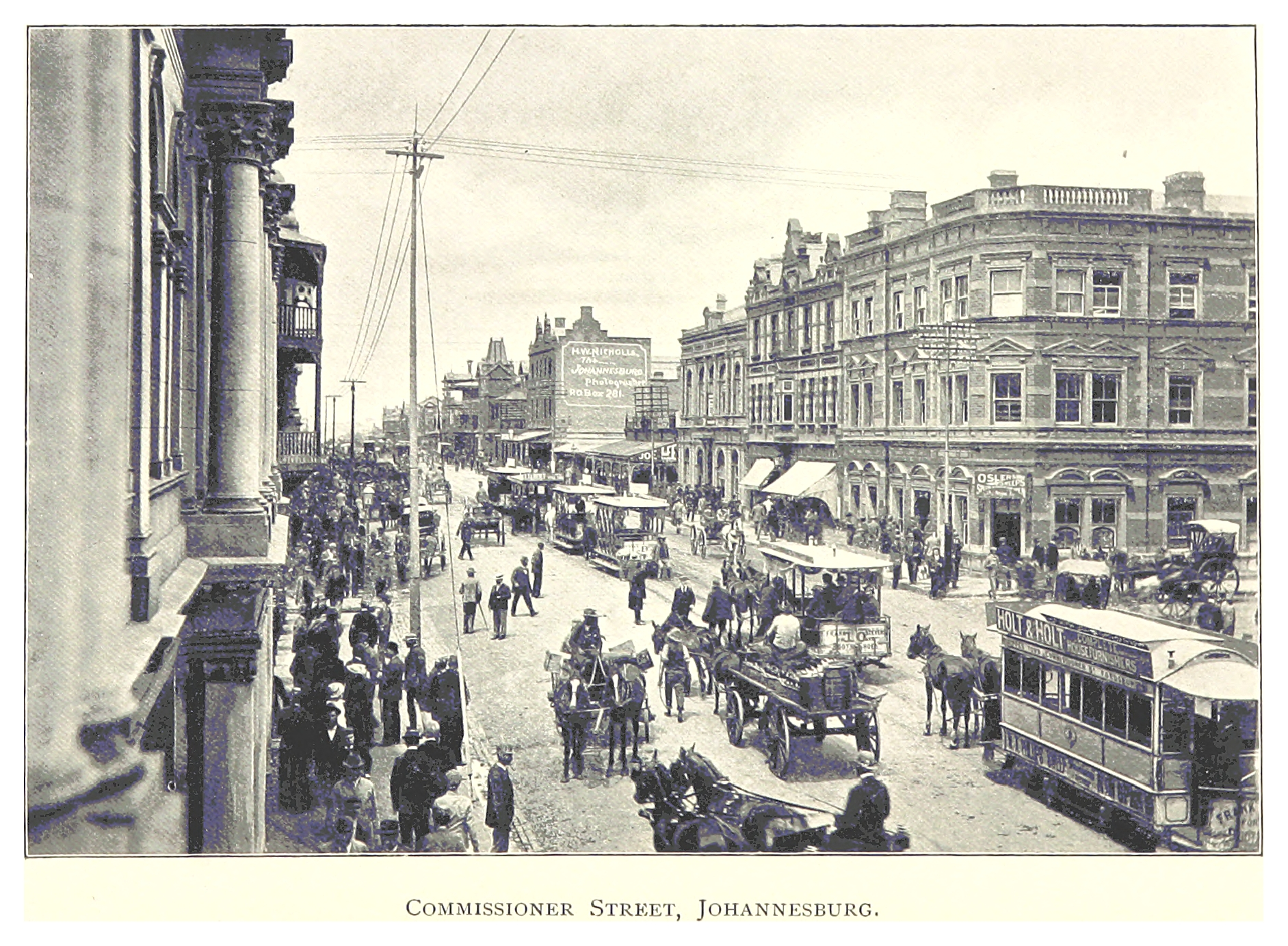
Commissioner Street in 1895

Like many late 19th-century mining towns, Johannesburg was a rough and disorganised place, populated by white miners from all continents, African tribesmen were recruited to perform unskilled mine work, African women beer brewers cooked for and sold beer to the black migrant workers, a very large number of European prostitutes, gangsters, impoverished Afrikaners, tradesmen, and the "AmaWasha", Zulu men who surprisingly dominated laundry work. As the value of control of the land increased, tensions developed between the Boer–dominated Transvaal government in Pretoria and the British, culminating in the Jameson Raid that ended in fiasco at Doornkop in January 1896. The Second Boer War (1899–1902) saw British forces under Field Marshal Frederick Sleigh Roberts, 1st Earl Roberts, occupy the city on 30 May 1900 after a series of battles to the south-west of its then-limits, near present-day Krugersdorp.

Fighting took place at the Gatsrand Pass (near Zakariyya Park) on 27 May, north of Vanwyksrust—today's Nancefield, Eldorado Park and Naturena—the next day, culminating in a mass infantry attack on what is now the waterworks ridge in Chiawelo and Senaoane on 29 May.

During the Boer war, many African mineworkers left Johannesburg creating a labour shortage, which the mines ameliorated by bringing in labourers from China, especially southern China. After the war, they were replaced by black workers, but many Chinese stayed on, creating Johannesburg's Chinese community, which during the apartheid era, was not legally classified as "Asian", but as "Coloured". The population in 1904 was 155,642, of whom 83,363 were whites.

=== Post-Union history ===
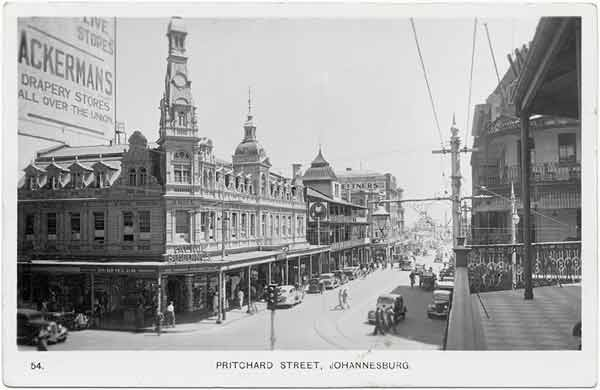
Pritchard Street c. 1910

In 1917, Johannesburg became the headquarters of the Anglo-American Corporation founded by Ernest Oppenheimer which ultimately became one of the world's largest corporations, dominating both gold-mining and diamond-mining in South Africa. Major building developments took place in the 1930s, after South Africa went off the gold standard. In the late 1940s and early 1950s, Hillbrow went high-rise. In the 1950s and early 1960s, the apartheid government constructed the massive agglomeration of townships that became known as Soweto. New freeways encouraged massive suburban sprawl to the north of the city. In the late 1960s and early 1970s, tower blocks (including the Carlton Centre and the Southern Life Centre) filled the skyline of the central business district.

The system of apartheid, a comprehensive system of racial separation was imposed upon South Africa starting in 1948. For its growth, the economy of Johannesburg depended upon hundreds of thousands of skilled white workers imported from Europe and semi- and un-skilled black workers imported from other parts of Southern Africa. Though they worked together they were forced by the government to live separately. Work was considered to be an exception to apartheid in order to keep Johannesburg functioning as South Africa's economic capital.

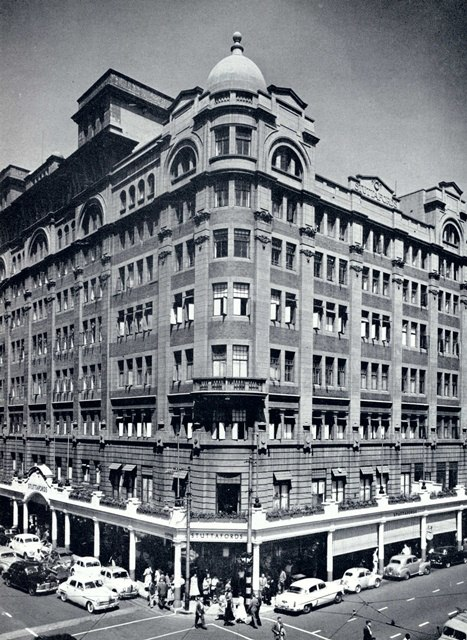
Stuttafords department stores in Johannesburg in 1957

In the 1950s, the government began a policy of building townships for black families (prior to this unskilled workers were asked to work on "single status" in male-only hostels at the mines and had to commute to see their families in whatever province they originated) outside of Johannesburg to provide workers for Johannesburg. Soweto, a township founded for black workers coming to work in the gold mines of Johannesburg, was intended to house 50,000 people, but soon was the home of ten times that number as thousands of unemployed rural blacks came to Johannesburg for employment and an income to send back to their villages. It was estimated that in 1989, the population of Soweto was equal to that of Johannesburg, if not greater.

In March 1960, Johannesburg witnessed widespread demonstrations against apartheid in response to the Sharpeville massacre. On 11 July 1963, the South African Police raided a house in the Johannesburg suburb of Rivonia where nine members of the banned African National Congress (ANC) were arrested on charges of planning sabotage. Their arrest led to the famous Rivonia Trial. The nine arrested included one Indo-South African, one coloured, two whites and five blacks, one of whom was the future president Nelson Mandela. At their trial, the accused freely admitted that they were guilty of what they were charged with, namely of planning to blow up the hydro-electric system of Johannesburg to shut down the gold mines, but Mandela argued to the court that the ANC had tried non-violent resistance to apartheid and failed, leaving him with no other choice. The trial made Mandela into a national figure and a symbol of resistance to apartheid.

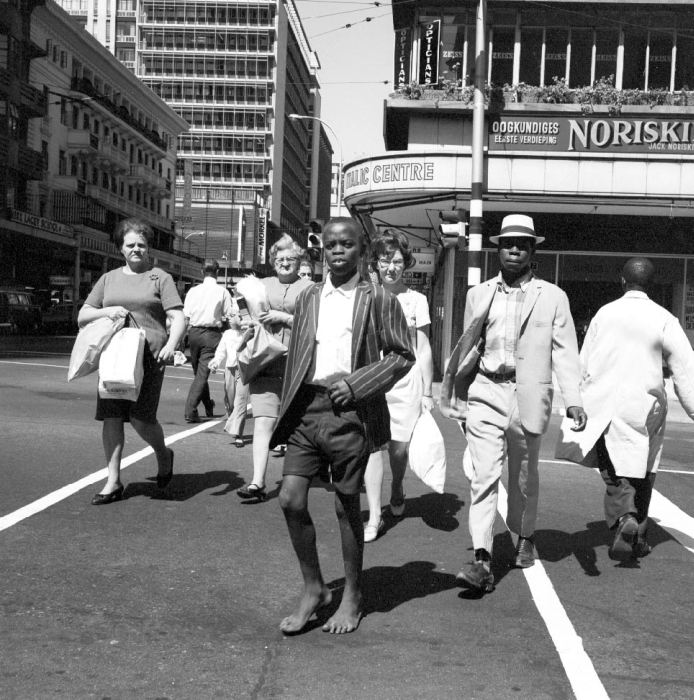
Street scene in Johannesburg in 1970

On 16 June 1976, demonstrations broke out in Soweto over a government decree that black school-children be educated in Afrikaans instead of English, and after the police fired on the demonstrations, rioting against apartheid began in Soweto and spread into the greater Johannesburg area. About 575 people, the majority of whom were black, were killed in the Soweto uprising of 1976. Between 1984 and 1986, South Africa was in turmoil as a series of nationwide protests, strikes and riots took place against apartheid, and the black townships around Johannesburg were scenes of some of the fiercest struggles between the police and anti-apartheid demonstrators.

The central area of the city underwent something of a decline in the 1980s and 1990s, due to the high crime rate and when property speculators directed large amounts of capital into suburban shopping malls, decentralised office parks, and entertainment centres. Sandton City was opened in 1973, followed by Rosebank Mall in 1976, and Eastgate in 1979.

During the 1990s, the city faced rapid growth of crime throughout large parts of the city. Some areas of skyscrapers were abandoned, many residents left their homes, and businesses moved out. Some historical buildings in central areas were destroyed by fires that spread relentlessly.

=== Twenty-first century ===
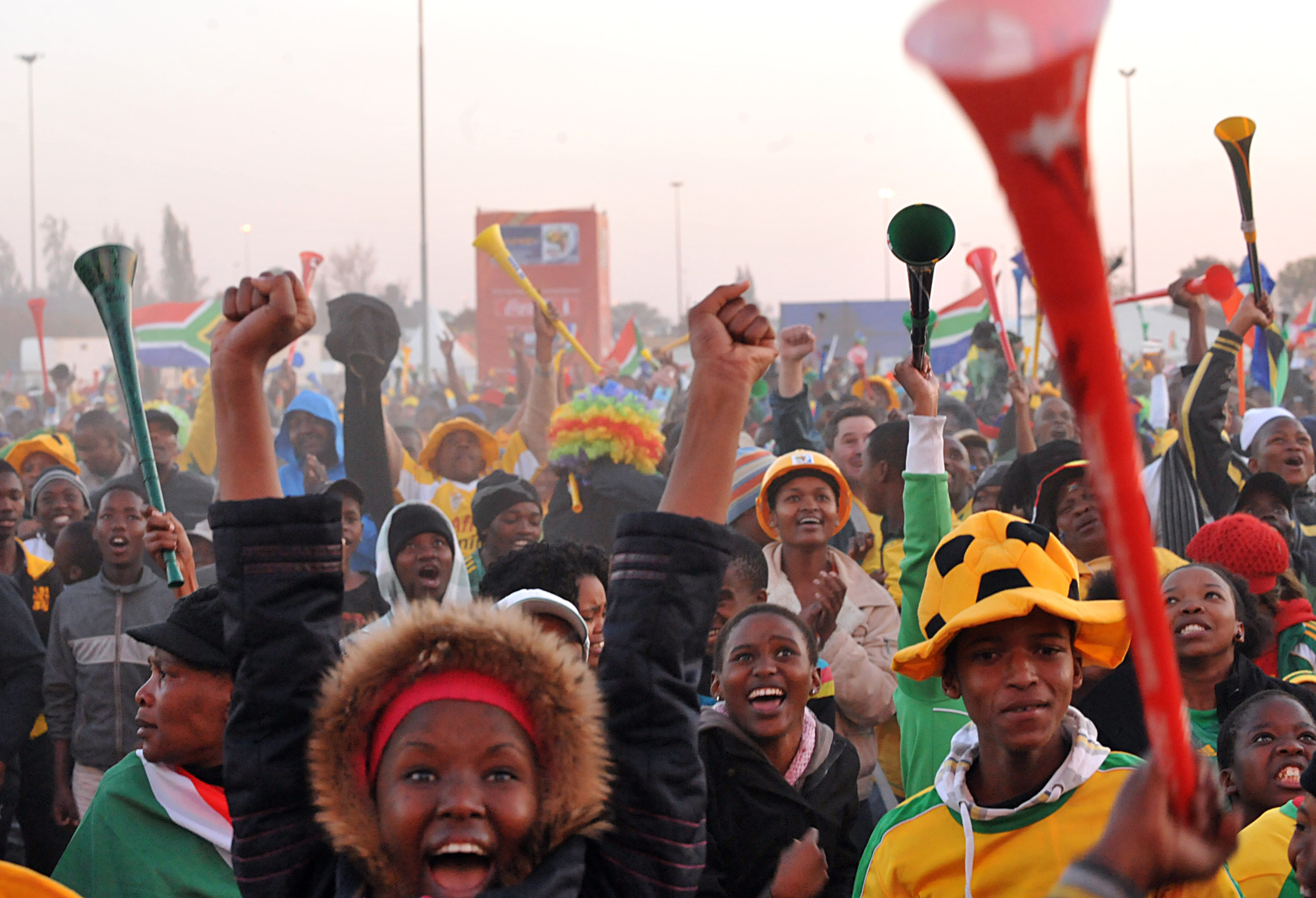
Fans of South Africa national soccer team watching the 2010 FIFA World Cup with vuvuzelas in the township of Soweto, a suburb of Johannesburg.

The end of apartheid saw the administrative unification of Johannesburg's apartheid-era city proper with surrounding townships and settlements into the City of Johannesburg Metropolitan Municipality. However, the spatial legacy of apartheid has proven difficult to overcome and Johannesburg remains among the most unequal cities in the world.

In 2025, Johannesburg remained the world's fifth most dangerous city by crime rate. Attempts to revive Johannesburg's CBD, most notably in the Maboneng District, have failed to halt the rising crime rate and infrastructure deterioration in the inner city. Abandoned buildings in the city's Hillbrow district have been increasingly captured by gangs and on 31 August 2023, at least 76 people died when a hijacked building caught fire in Johannesburg. In March 2025, South African President Cyril Ramaphosa launched a rescue plan to address the city's "rapidly declining infrastructure".

Since 1994, Johannesburg has further seen increased incidents of xenophobic violence against migrants from other African countries. On 12 May 2008, a series of riots started in the township of Alexandra, in the north-eastern part of Johannesburg, when locals attacked migrants from Mozambique, Malawi and Zimbabwe, killing two people and injuring 40 others. These riots sparked the nationwide xenophobic attacks of 2008, which saw 60 more killings and widespread destruction of immigrant properties. The 2015 and 2019 Johannesburg riots similarly displayed outbreaks of mass violence against migrants.

Modern Johannesburg has hosted a number of international summits and sport events. The 2010 FIFA World Cup final took place at FNB Stadium, the largest stadium in Africa, while the World Cup closing ceremony on the next day saw the final public appearance of Nelson Mandela. In 2015, Johannesburg hosted the African Union Summit, which sparked international outrage as South Africa aided the arrival and escape of Omar al-Bashir despite an international arrest warrant for war crimes by the International Criminal Court. In 2018, Johannesburg hosted the 10th BRICS Summit and in 2023 the 15th BRICS summit. The 2025 G20 Johannesburg Summit saw heads of state and government convene for the first G20 Presidency of an African country.

=== Infrastructure degradation and mismanagement in the 2020s ===
In recent years, the City of Johannesburg has been severely mismanaged. The City's old municipal headquarters was abandoned, and planning documents were left behind. The metro's infrastructure is widely reported to be failing, including that of water and electricity supply, and road maintenance. Bills for services are overdue, with service providers threatening to cut off the city's supply. Physical infrastructure has not been adequately maintained, and basic municipal services like attending to potholes, repairing sidewalks, fixing malfunctioning traffic signals, and collecting garbage, have not been properly fulfilled. This is despite residents paying rates to the City.

In April 2026, national Finance Minister Enoch Godongwana wrote to Joburg Mayor and member of the African National Congress (ANC) Dada Morero, stating that the City had violated the Municipal Finance Management Act numerous times. Godongwana also said that Joburg's upcoming budget was unfunded and said it should not be passed. Finally, the Minister instructed Mayor Morero to fix the City's finances, or have its national transfer of funds (worth around R8 billion) cut off.

The Democratic Alliance threatened to take legal action against the Minister of Finance if he did not intervene with Joburg's financial situation. Godongwana set a deadline in June 2026 to receive a written explanation from the Mayor of Joburg about the matter, but this was not met. As such, the Minister said he would proceed with cutting off the City's national funds transfer.

== Geography ==
=== Topography ===
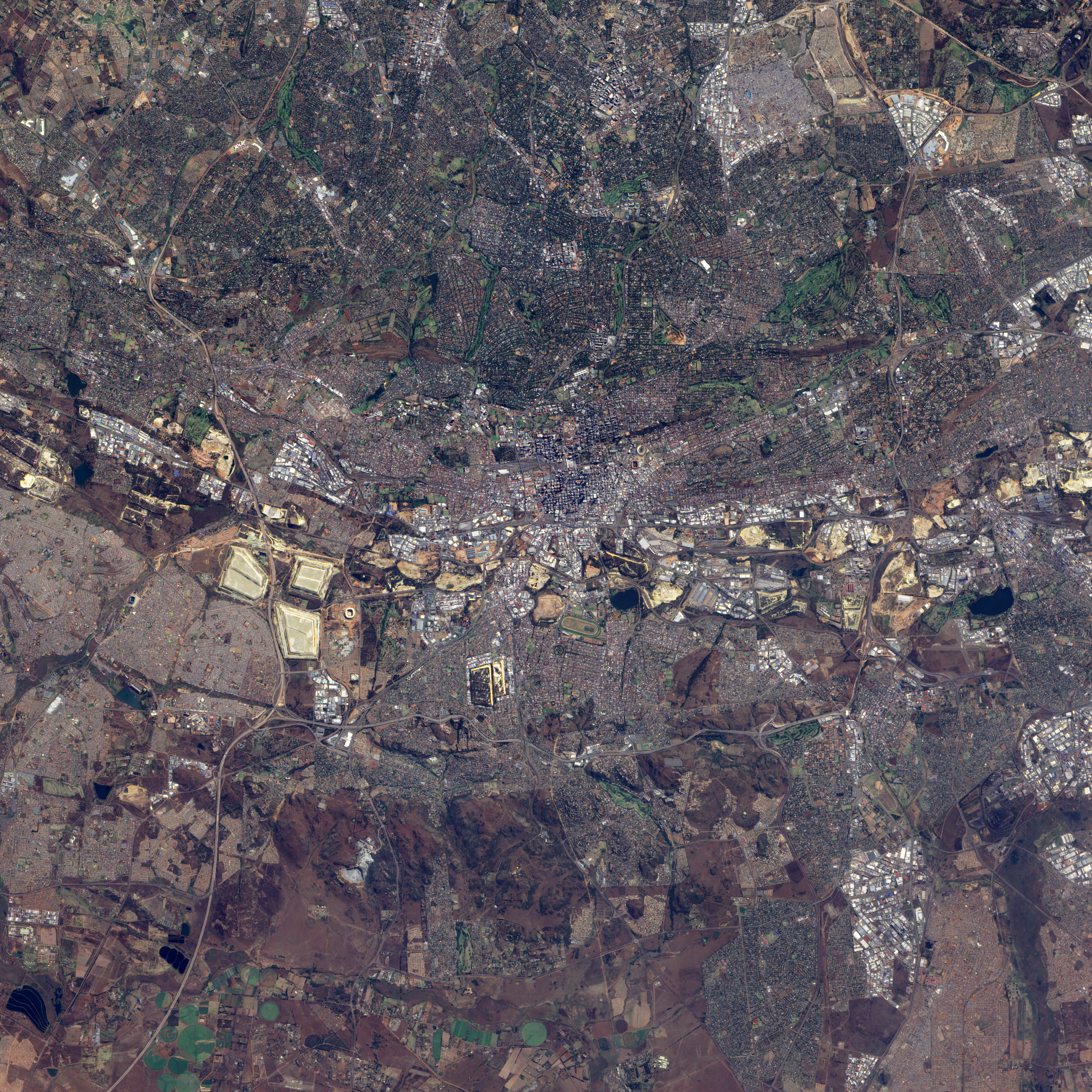
Satellite image of Johannesburg

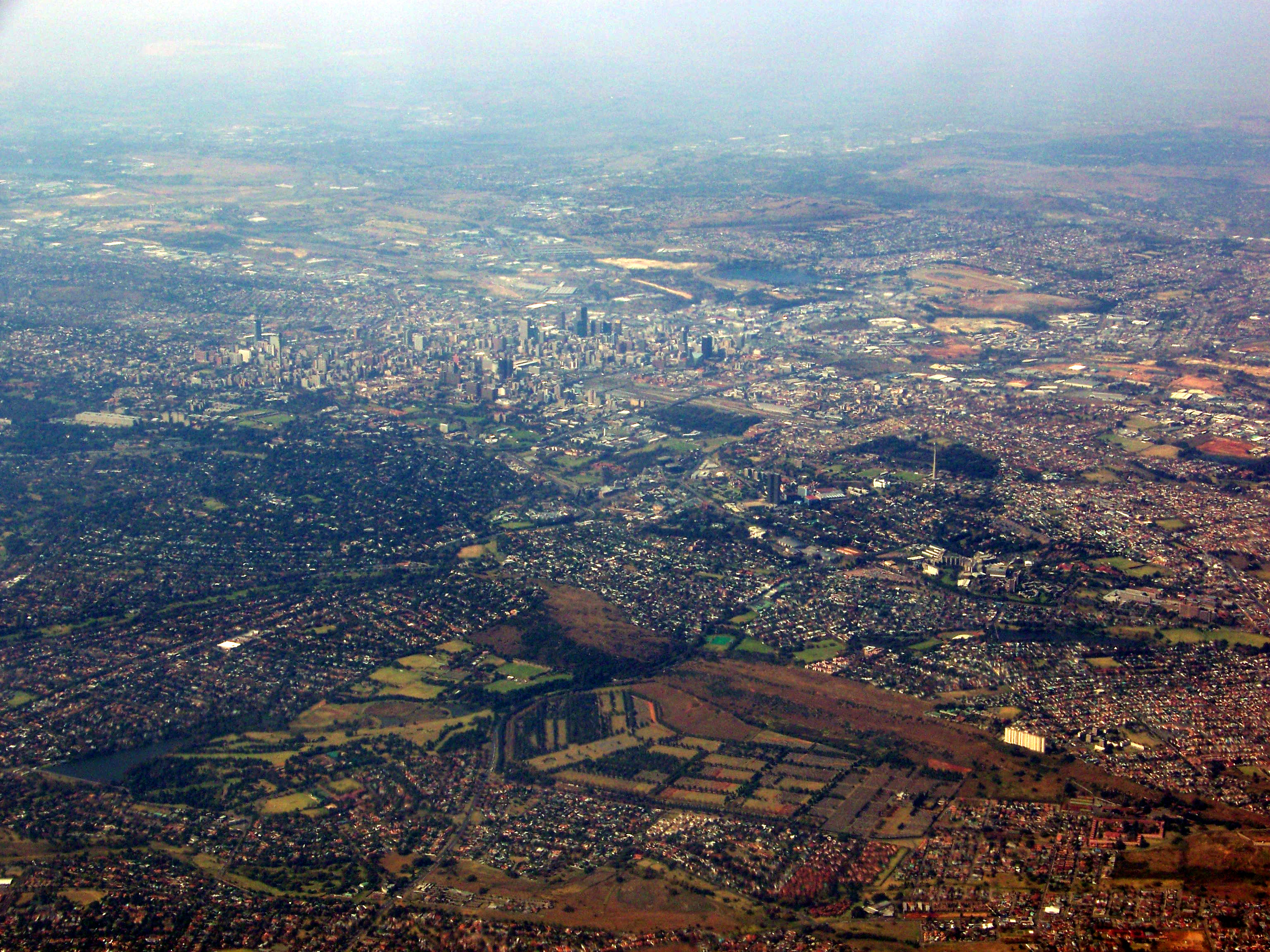
January 2008 Johannesburg aerial view looking towards the south-east

Johannesburg is located in the eastern plateau area of South Africa known as the Highveld, at an elevation of 1,753 metres (5,751 ft). The former Central Business District is located on the southern side of the prominent ridge called the Witwatersrand (English: White Water's Ridge) and the terrain falls to the north and south. By and large the Witwatersrand marks the watershed between the Limpopo and Vaal rivers as the northern part of the city is drained by the Jukskei River while the southern part of the city, including most of the Central Business District, is drained by the Klip River. The north and west of the city has undulating hills while the eastern parts are flatter.

Johannesburg may not be built on a river or harbour, but its streams contribute to two of southern Africa's mightiest rivers, the Limpopo and the Orange. Most of the springs from which many of these streams emanate are now covered in concrete and canalised, accounting for the fact that the names of early farms in the area often end with "fontein", meaning "spring" in Afrikaans. Braamfontein, Rietfontein, Zevenfontein, Doornfontein, Zandfontein and Randjesfontein are some examples. When the first white settlers reached the area that is now Johannesburg, they noticed the glistening rocks on the ridges, running with trickles of water, fed by the streams—giving the area its name, the Witwatersrand, "the ridge of white waters". Another explanation is that the whiteness comes from the quartzite rock, which has a particular sheen to it after rain.

The site was not chosen for its streams, however. The main reasons the city was founded where it stands today was because of the gold. Indeed, the city once sat near massive amounts of gold, given that at one point the Witwatersrand gold industry produced forty per cent of the planet's gold.

=== Parks and gardens ===
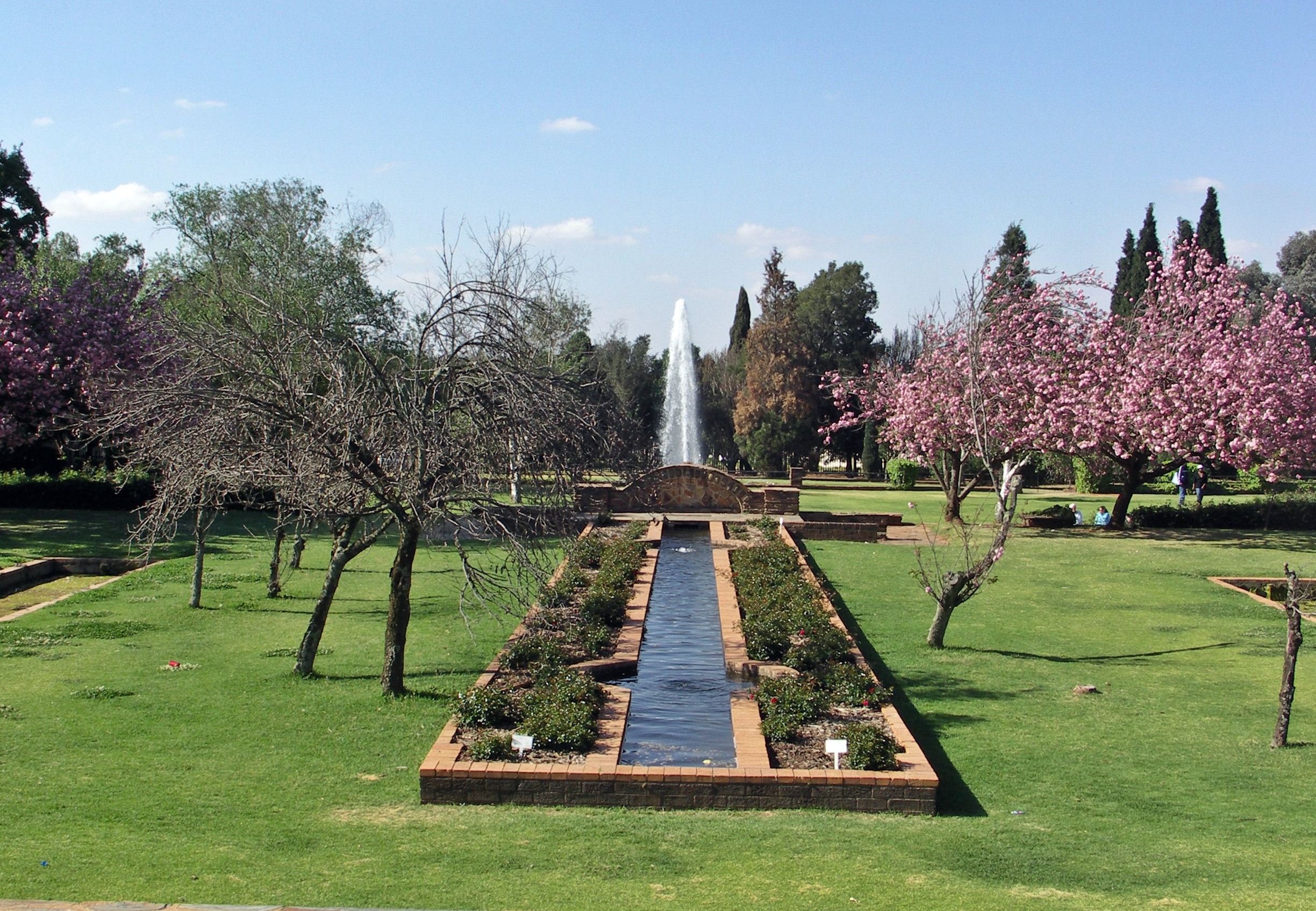
Johannesburg Botanical Garden

Parks and gardens in Johannesburg are maintained by Johannesburg City Parks and Zoo. City Parks is also responsible for planting the city's many green trees, making Johannesburg one of the 'greenest' cities in the world. It has been estimated that there are six million trees in the city with the number growing every year—1.2 million on pavements and sidewalks, and a further 4.8 million in private gardens. City Parks continues to invest in planting trees, particularly those previously disadvantaged areas of Johannesburg which were not positive beneficiaries of apartheid Johannesburg's urban planning. Johannesburg Botanical Garden, located in the suburb of Emmarentia, is a popular recreational park.

Johannesburg and environs also offer various options to visitors wishing to view wildlife, in addition to the Johannesburg Zoo, one of the largest in South Africa. The Lion Park nature reserve, next to Lesedi Cultural Village, is home to over 80 lions and various other game, while the Krugersdorp Nature Reserve, a 1500 ha game reserve, is a forty-minute drive from the city centre. The De Wildt Cheetah Centre in the Magaliesberg runs a successful breeding program for cheetah, wild dog and other endangered species. The Rhino & Lion Nature Reserve, situated in the "Cradle of Humankind" on 1200 ha of "the typical highveld of Gauteng" also runs a breeding programme for endangered species including Bengal tigers, Siberian tigers and the extremely rare white lion. To the south, 11 kilometres (6.8 miles) from the city centre, is the Klipriviersberg Nature Reserve home to large mammals and hiking trails. Separating Lenasia and the Soweto suburbs is the Olifantsvlei Nature Reserve protected area.

=== Climate ===
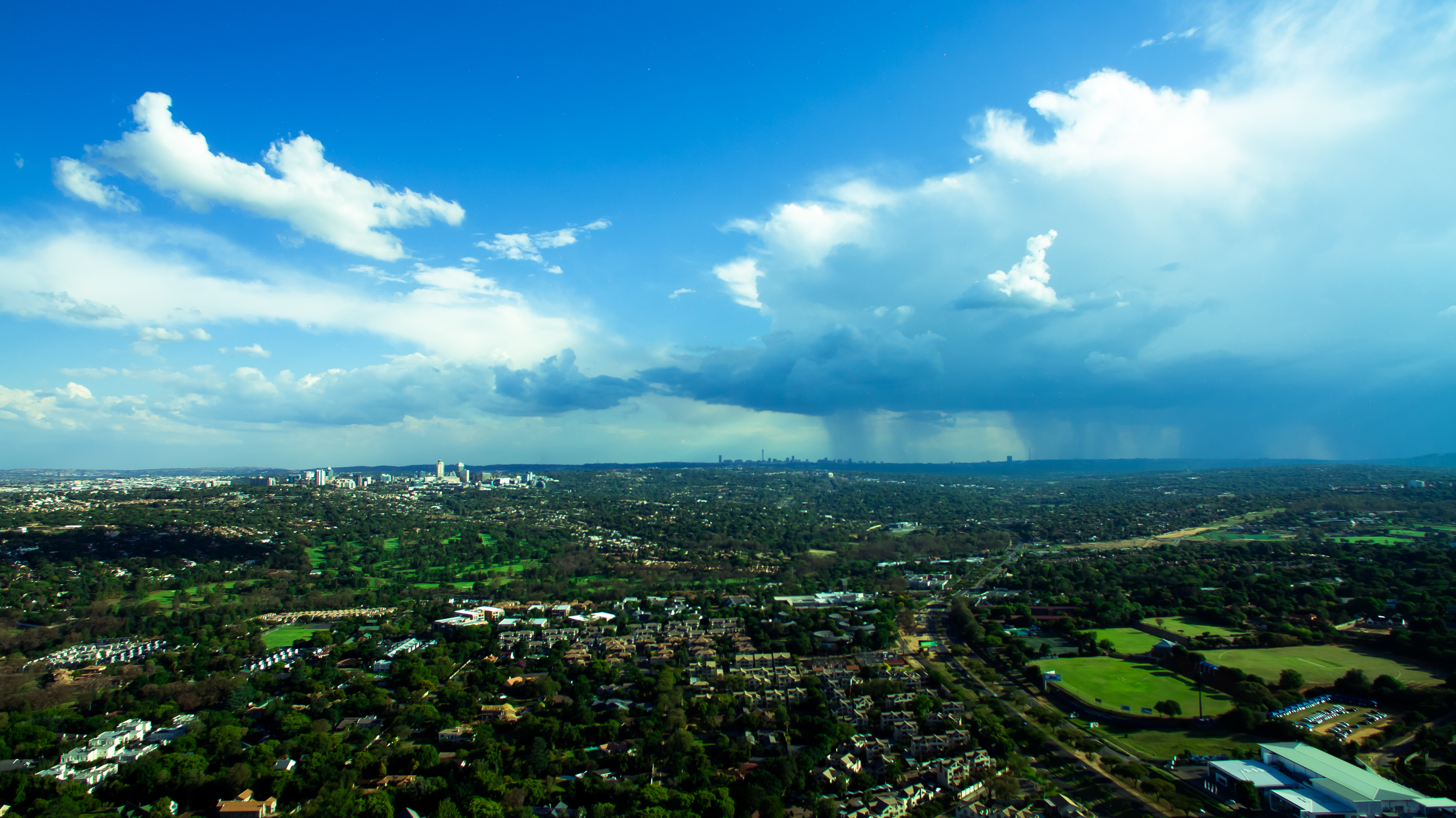
An aerial photograph of summer rain clouds over Johannesburg. The city's climate experiences regular daily thunderstorms from November to March in the afternoons.

Johannesburg is situated on the highveld plateau, and has a subtropical highland climate (Köppen: Cwb, Trewartha: Cwbk). The city enjoys a sunny climate, with the summer months (October to April) characterised by hot days followed by afternoon thundershowers and cool evenings, and the winter months (May to September) by dry, sunny days followed by cold nights. Temperatures in Johannesburg are usually fairly mild due to the city's high elevation, with an average maximum daytime temperature in January of 25.6 °C (78.1 °F), dropping to an average maximum of around 16 °C (61 °F) in June. The UV index for Johannesburg in summers is extreme, often reaching 14–16 due to the high elevation and its location in the subtropics.

Winter is the sunniest time of the year, with mild days and cool nights, dropping to around 4.1 °C (39.4 °F) in June and July. The temperature occasionally drops to below freezing at night, causing frost. Snow is a rare occurrence, with snowfall having been experienced in the twentieth century during May 1956, August 1962, June 1964 and September 1981. In the 21st century, there was light sleet in 2006, as well as snow proper on 27 June 2007 (accumulating up to 10 centimetres or 4 inches in the southern suburbs), 7 August 2012, and 10 July 2023.

Regular cold fronts pass over in winter bringing very cold southerly winds but usually clear skies. The annual average rainfall is 713 millimetres (28.1 in), which is mostly concentrated in the summer months. Infrequent showers occur through the course of the winter months. The lowest nighttime minimum temperature ever recorded in Johannesburg is −8.2 °C (17.2 °F), on 13 June 1979. The lowest daytime maximum temperature recorded is 1.5 °C (34.7 °F), on 19 June 1964.

Climate data for Johannesburg (O. R. Tambo International Airport), elevation 1,695 m (5,561 ft), (1991–2020 normals, extremes 1951–present)
Month	Jan	Feb	Mar	Apr	May	Jun	Jul	Aug	Sep	Oct	Nov	Dec	Year
Record high °C (°F)	38.0 (100.4)	33.5 (92.3)	31.9 (89.4)	29.3 (84.7)	26.4 (79.5)	23.1 (73.6)	24.4 (75.9)	30.0 (86.0)	34.5 (94.1)	32.2 (90.0)	36.5 (97.7)	35.5 (95.9)	38.0 (100.4)
Mean daily maximum °C (°F)	25.5 (77.9)	25.6 (78.1)	24.4 (75.9)	21.7 (71.1)	19.6 (67.3)	17.3 (63.1)	15.8 (60.4)	20.1 (68.2)	23.6 (74.5)	25.0 (77.0)	25.1 (77.2)	25.5 (77.9)	22.4 (72.4)
Daily mean °C (°F)	20.0 (68.0)	19.8 (67.6)	18.6 (65.5)	16.1 (61.0)	13.5 (56.3)	10.7 (51.3)	9.7 (49.5)	13.1 (55.6)	16.7 (62.1)	17.1 (62.8)	17.9 (64.2)	19.0 (66.2)	15.5 (59.9)
Mean daily minimum °C (°F)	14.9 (58.8)	14.7 (58.5)	13.4 (56.1)	10.7 (51.3)	7.6 (45.7)	4.7 (40.5)	3.5 (38.3)	6.5 (43.7)	9.8 (49.6)	11.8 (53.2)	13.1 (55.6)	14.5 (58.1)	10.4 (50.8)
Record low °C (°F)	7.2 (45.0)	6.0 (42.8)	2.1 (35.8)	0.5 (32.9)	−2.5 (27.5)	−8.2 (17.2)	−7.0 (19.4)	−5.0 (23.0)	−3.3 (26.1)	0.2 (32.4)	1.5 (34.7)	3.5 (38.3)	−8.2 (17.2)
Average precipitation mm (inches)	131.7 (5.19)	102.0 (4.02)	94.8 (3.73)	42.1 (1.66)	20.0 (0.79)	6.6 (0.26)	1.7 (0.07)	5.4 (0.21)	16.2 (0.64)	68.4 (2.69)	101.1 (3.98)	130.0 (5.12)	720.0 (28.35)
Average precipitation days (≥ 1.0 mm)	10.2	8.4	8.1	4.7	1.8	1.1	0.3	0.8	1.8	7.0	10.4	12.6	67.2
Average relative humidity (%)	69	70	68	65	56	53	49	46	47	56	65	66	59
Average dew point °C (°F)	14.1 (57.4)	14.2 (57.6)	12.6 (54.7)	9.5 (49.1)	4.9 (40.8)	1.5 (34.7)	−0.5 (31.1)	1.7 (35.1)	5.3 (41.5)	8.2 (46.8)	11.2 (52.2)	12.5 (54.5)	7.9 (46.3)
Mean monthly sunshine hours	250.1	224.8	238.8	236.9	276.0	266.9	283.9	284.1	280.8	269.5	248.7	263.9	3,124.4
Mean daily daylight hours	13.6	13.0	12.2	11.5	10.8	10.5	10.7	11.2	12.0	12.7	13.4	13.8	12.1
Average ultraviolet index	14	14	12	9	6	5	5	7	9	12	14	14	10
Source 1: NOAA (humidity and sun 1961–1990)Starlings Roost Weather
Source 2: South African Weather Service Weather Atlas

== Demographics ==
Johannesburg population
Year	Pop.	±% p.a.
1886	3,000	—
1904	99,052	+21.44%
1908	180,687	+16.22%
1985	1,783,000	+3.02%
1990	1,898,000	+1.26%
2000	2,745,000	+3.76%
2001	3,326,055	+21.17%
2005	3,272,600	−0.40%
2011	4,474,829	+5.35%
2022	4,803,262	+0.65%

According to the 2022 South African National Census, the population of Johannesburg is 4,803,262 people, making it the most populous city in South Africa (it has been the most populous city in South Africa since at least the 1950s). From the 2001 census, the people live in 1,006,930 formal households, of which 86% have a flush or chemical toilet, and 91% have refuse removed by the municipality at least once a week. 81% of households have access to running water, and 80% use electricity as the main source of energy. 29% of Johannesburg residents stay in informal dwellings. 66% of households are headed by one person.

Johannesburg's urban agglomeration spreads well beyond the administrative boundary of the municipality. The population of the whole area has been estimated to be variously at 7,860,781 in 2011 by "citypopulation.de" and as high as 15,026,000 in 2025 by Demographia (which thusly classifies it as a megacity). Johannesburg's suburbs are the product of urban sprawl and are regionalised into north, south, east and west, and they generally have different personalities. Greater Johannesburg consists of more than five hundred suburbs in an area covering more than two hundred square miles (520 square kilometres). Although black Africans can be found throughout Johannesburg and its surrounding area, greater Johannesburg remains highly racially segregated.

Within the Metropolitan Municipality, the old centre, established in 1886 and given city status in 1928, has been listed in recent censuses as a "main place". As of 2011, this main place had a population of 957,441 and an area of 334.81 km^{2}. Some authors consider the metropolitan area to include most of Gauteng province. The UN's Population Division in 2016 estimated the metropolitan area population to be 9,616,000.

Blacks account for 73% of the population, followed by whites at 18%, coloureds at 6% and Asians at 4%. 42% of the population is under the age of 24, while 6% of the population is over 60 years of age. 37% of city residents are unemployed. 91% of the unemployed are Black African. Women comprise 43% of the working population. 19% of economically active adults work in wholesale and retail sectors, 18% in financial, real estate and business services, 17% in the community, social and personal services and 12% are in manufacturing. Only 0.7% work in mining.

Ethnic make-up of Johannesburg, 1948
Race	Number	Percent
Black	510,160	56%
White	364,400	40%
Coloured	27,330	3%
Indian	9,110	1%

Ethnic make-up of Johannesburg
Year	1996		2001		2011		2019	
Race	Number	Percent	Number	Percent	Number	Percent	Number	Percent
Black	1,814,760	71%	2,354,475	73%	3,361,600	76.60%	4,130,000	80.17%
White	587,880	23%	516,049	16%	541,000	12.30%	504,000	9.79%
Coloured	102,240	4%	193,518	6%	246,400	5.60%	272,000	5.27%
Indian	51,120	2%	129,012	4%	215,600	4.90%	245,000	4.76%

=== Religion ===
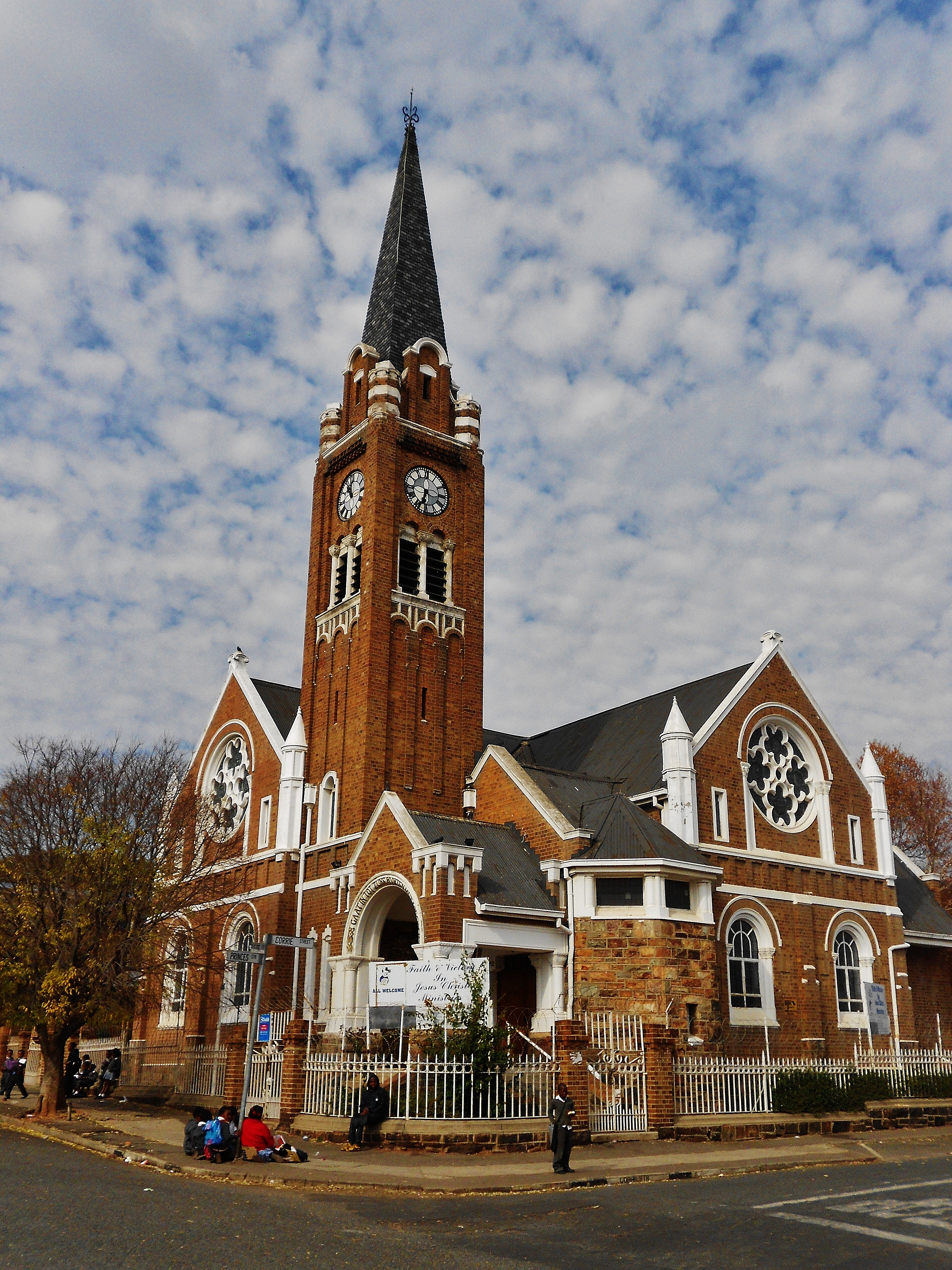
Dutch Reformed Church in Jeppestown

53% belong to mainstream Christian churches, 24% are not affiliated with any organised religion, 14% are members of African Independent Churches, 3% are Muslim, 1% are Jewish and 1% are Hindu. There are Muslim mosques, Hindu temples, a Sikh Gurudwara (Sikh Temple) in Sandton and a large number of synagogues.

==== Christianity ====
Places of worship in Johannesburg are predominantly Christian churches: Serbian Orthodox Church, Zion Christian Church, Apostolic Faith Mission of South Africa, Assemblies of God, Baptist Union of Southern Africa (Baptist World Alliance), Dutch Reformed Church in South Africa (NGK), Methodist Church of Southern Africa (World Methodist Council), Anglican Church of Southern Africa (Anglican Communion), Presbyterian Church of Africa (World Communion of Reformed Churches), Roman Catholic Archdiocese of Johannesburg (Catholic Church) and the Johannesburg South Africa Temple (Church of Jesus Christ of Latter-day Saints).

Albert Street Methodist Church, in central Johannesburg, is historically significant for its role as a refuge for anti-apartheid activists, including Albertina Sisulu.

==== Judaism ====
Most of Johannesburg's estimated 50,000 Jews live in the north-eastern suburbs: Glenhazel, Raedene Estate, Kew, Norwood, Highlands North, Sandringham, Savoy Estate, Waverley, Orchards, Oaklands and Fairmount. There are many Orthodox synagogues in the city including Great Park Synagogue, Oxford Shul and Doornfontein Synagogue. There is a smaller number of synagogues serving the city's Reform Jews, including Temple Israel and Beit Emanuel.

=== Languages ===
Geographical distribution of home languages in Johannesburg Afrikaans English Ndebele Xhosa Zulu Northern Sotho Sotho Tswana Venda Tsonga No language dominant

32% of Johannesburg residents speak Nguni languages at home, 24% speak Sotho languages, 18% speak English, 7% speak Afrikaans and 6% speak Tshivenda.

Gender	Population	%
Female	473,148	49.42
Male	484,293	50.58

Race	Population	%
Black African	614,793	64.21
White	133,379	13.93
Coloured	133,029	13.89
Asian	63,918	6.68
Other	12,320	1.29

First language	Population	%
Zulu	1,022,747	23.41
Sotho	420,117	9.61
Xhosa	298,523	6.83
Afrikaans	318,063	7.28
Tswana	335,713	7.68
Sepedi	317,277	7.26
English	878,230	20.10
Tsonga	287,625	6.58
Swazi	35,926	0.82
Venda	141,435	3.24
Ndebele	126,587	2.90
Other	168,566	3.86
Sign language	18,793	0.43

=== Education ===
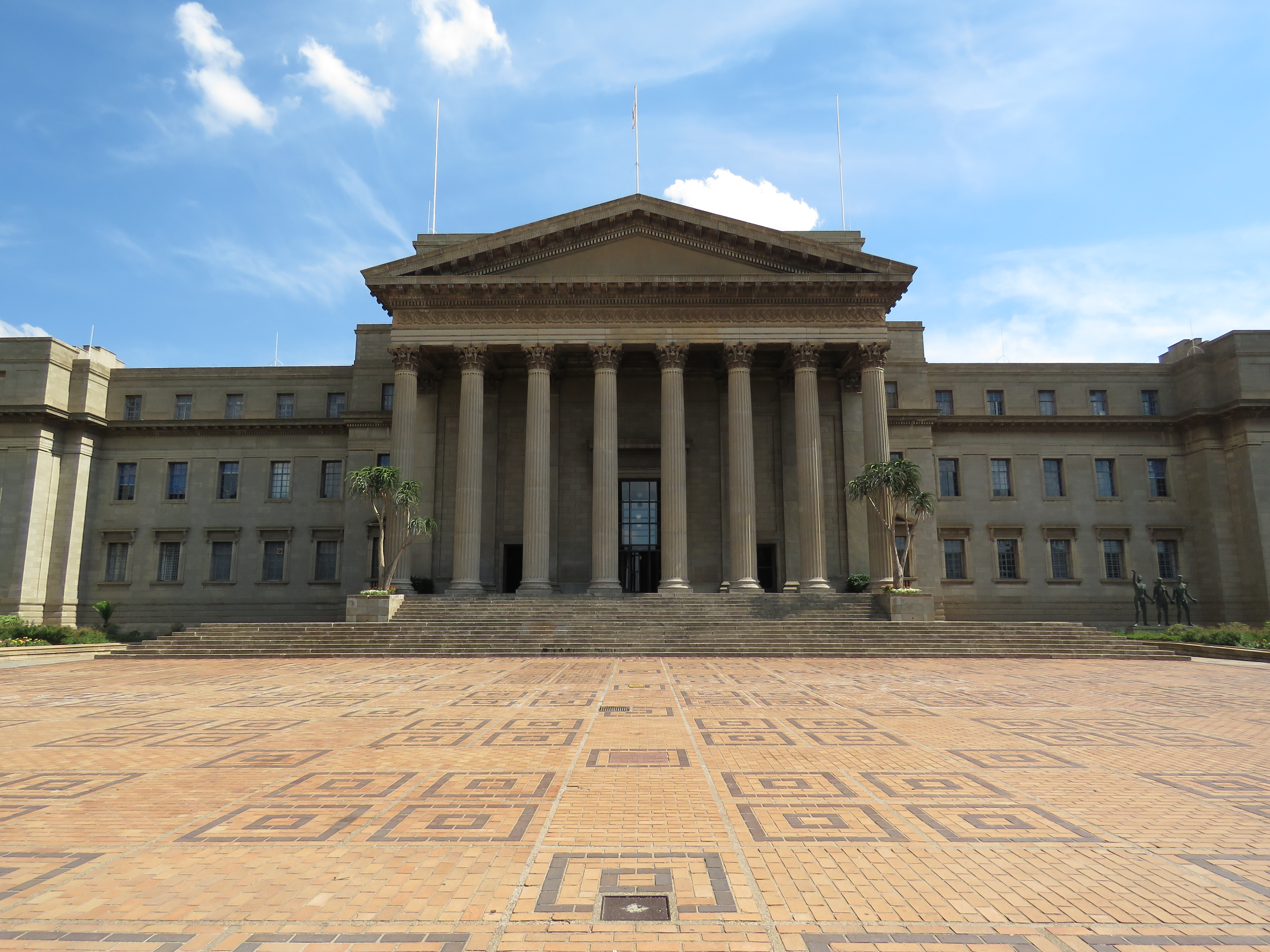
The University of the Witwatersrand

Johannesburg has a well-developed higher education system of both private and public universities. Johannesburg is served by the public universities University of the Witwatersrand and the University of Johannesburg.

University of Johannesburg was formed on 1 January 2005, when three separate universities and campuses—Rand Afrikaans University, Technikon Witwatersrand, and the Johannesburg campuses of Vista University—were merged. The new university offers education primarily in English and Afrikaans, although courses may be taken in any of South Africa's official languages.

The University of the Witwatersrand is one of the leading universities in Africa, and is famous as a centre of resistance to apartheid. It is attached to one of the world's largest hospitals, the Chris Hani Baragwanath Hospital, located in Soweto.

The University of Pretoria's business school the Gordon Institute of Business Science is located in Illovo, Johannesburg.

Many private colleges are also situated in Johannesburg, such as Damelin, CTI, Lyceum College and the South African campus of Monash University (six of the other campuses are in Australia, while the eighth is in Malaysia), as well as the Midrand Graduate Institute which is located in Midrand.

Johannesburg also has one of several film schools in the country, one of which has won an Academy Award for Best Foreign Student Film in 2006. The South African School of Motion Picture and Live Performance, or AFDA for short, is situated in Auckland Park.

Johannesburg also has three teacher-training colleges and a technical college. There are numerous kindergartens, primary schools and high schools in the region.

== Economy ==
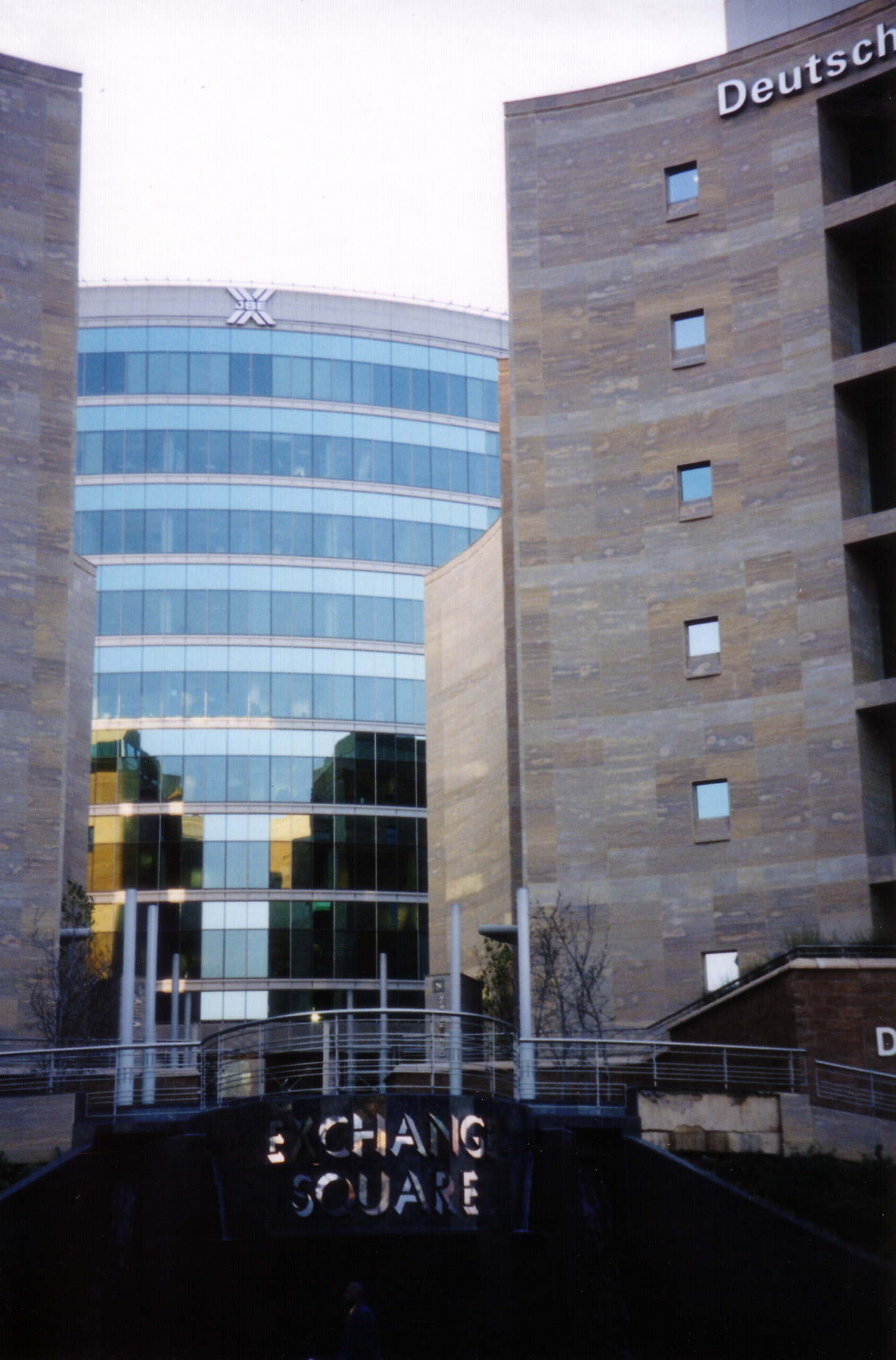
The Johannesburg Stock Exchange

Johannesburg is the economic and financial hub of South Africa, producing 16% of South Africa's gross domestic product, and accounts for 40% of Gauteng's economic activity. In a 2008 survey conducted by Mastercard, Johannesburg ranked 47 out of 50 top cities in the world as a worldwide centre of commerce (the only city in Africa).

Mining was the foundation of the Witwatersrand's economy, but its importance is gradually declining due to dwindling reserves and service and manufacturing industries have become more significant to the city's economy. While gold mining no longer takes place within the city limits, most mining companies still have their headquarters in Johannesburg. The city's manufacturing industries extend across a range of areas and there is still a reliance on heavy industries including steel and cement plants. The service and other industries include banking, IT, real estate, transport, broadcast and print media, private health care, transport and a vibrant leisure and consumer retail market. Johannesburg has Africa's largest stock exchange, the JSE although it has moved out of the central business district. Due to its commercial role, the city is the seat of the provincial government and the site of a number of government branch offices, as well as consular offices and other institutions.

The Witwatersrand urban complex is a major consumer of water in a dry region. Its continued economic and population growth has depended on schemes to divert water from other regions of South Africa and from the highlands of Lesotho, the biggest of which is the Lesotho Highlands Water Project, but additional sources will be needed early in the 21st century.

The container terminal at City Deep is known to be the largest "dry port" in the world, with some 50% of cargo that arrives through the ports of Durban and Cape Town arriving in Johannesburg. The City Deep area has been declared an IDZ (industrial development zone) by the Gauteng government.

=== Retail ===
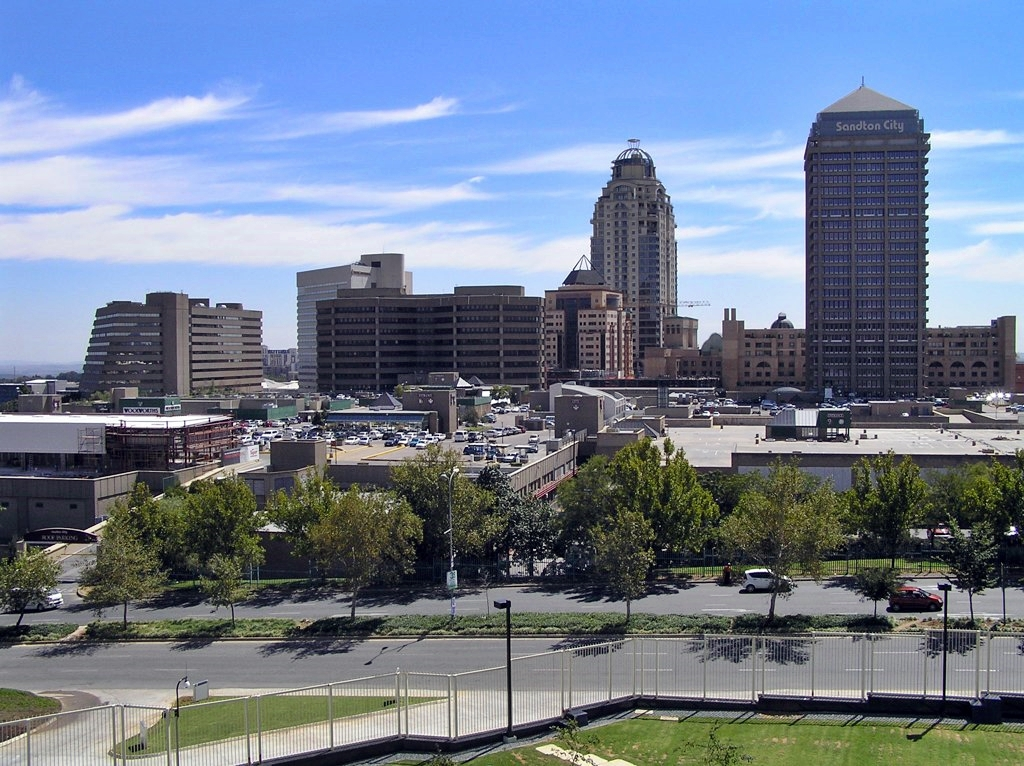
Sandton City shopping mall in Sandton, Johannesburg.

Johannesburg's largest shopping centres, measured by gross leasable area (GLA, the uniform measure of centre size as determined by the International Council of Shopping Centers) are Sandton City, Eastgate, Mall of Africa, Westgate and Cresta. Melrose Arch is one of its most prestigious. Other centres include Hyde Park Corner, Rosebank, Southgate, The Glen Shopping Centre, Johannesburg South, and Clearwater Mall. There were also plans to build a large shopping centre, known as the Zonk'Izizwe Shopping Resort, in Midrand, but these have been indefinitely delayed due to the opening of Mall of Africa. "Zonk'Izizwe" means "All Nations" in Zulu language, indicating that the centre will cater to the city's diverse mix of peoples and races. Also a complex named Greenstone in Modderfontein has been opened. Cradlestone Mall is a new mall named for its location which is close to the Cradle of Humankind, a World Heritage Site.

== Law and government ==
=== Government ===
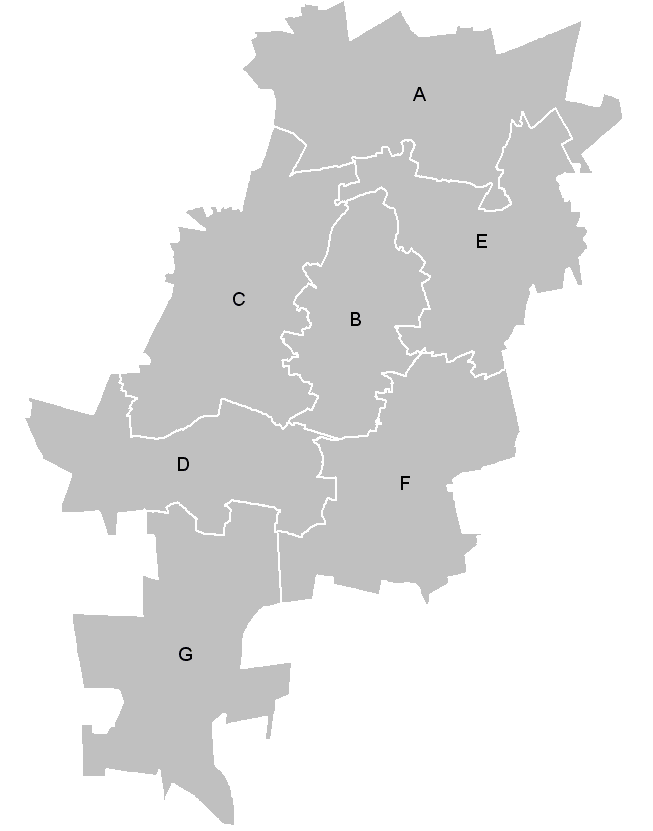
The seven regions of the city

Upon the creation of the Metropolitan Municipality in 2000 the city was subdivided into eleven regions, simply named Region 1 to Region 11. These were reorganised in 2006 into the current seven regions named alphabetically Region A to Region G, as shown on the nearby map.

As of 2006 the seven regions are:

- Region A: Diepsloot, Kya Sand;
- Region B: Randburg, Rosebank, Emmarentia, Greenside, Melville, Northcliff, Rosebank, Parktown, Parktown North;
- Region C: Roodepoort, Constantia Kloof, Northgate;
- Region D: Doornkop, Soweto, Dobsonville, Protea Glen;
- Region E: Alexandra, Wynberg, Sandton;
- Region F: Inner City;
- Region G: Orange Farm, Ennerdale, Lenasia.

In the 2016 municipal elections, the ruling party, the ANC, lost their majority in Johannesburg for the first time since taking power in 1994, claiming only 44.12% of the vote. The Economic Freedom Fighters and Democratic Alliance both agreed to vote for the DA mayoral candidate, Herman Mashaba, who was sworn into power as the first Democratic Alliance mayor of Johannesburg on 22 August 2016. The ANC returned to the city's executive on 4 December 2019 following the election of its regional chair, Geoff Makhubo, to the mayoralty. Makhubo died on 9 July 2021 and Eunice Mgcina was appointed acting mayor. A new mayor, Jolidee Matongo, was elected unopposed on 10 August 2021. Matongo died in a car accident in September 2021 and Mpho Moerane was elected to succeed him.

=== Crime ===
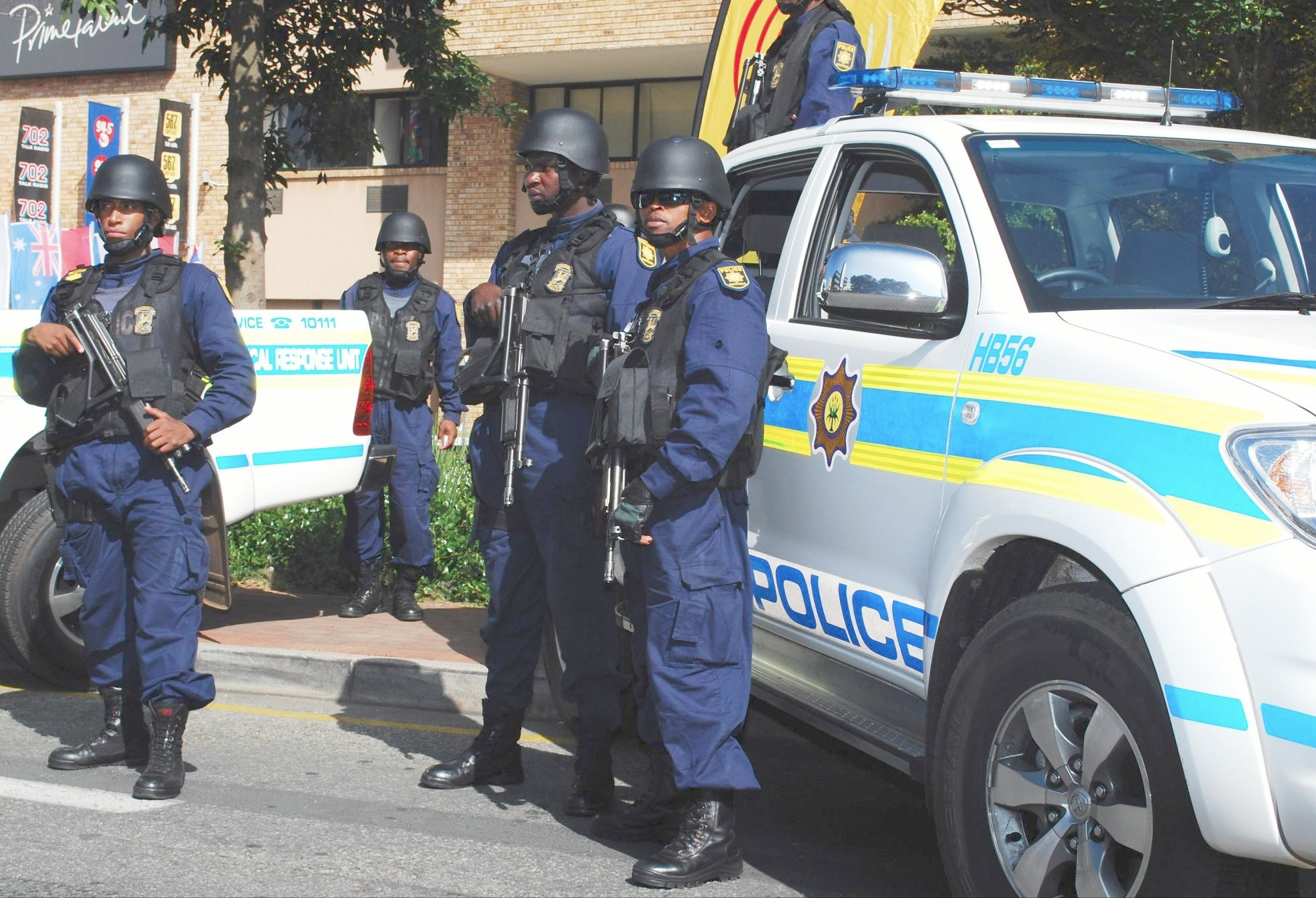
Officers of the South African Police Service with Vektor R5 rifles on parade in Johannesburg, 2010

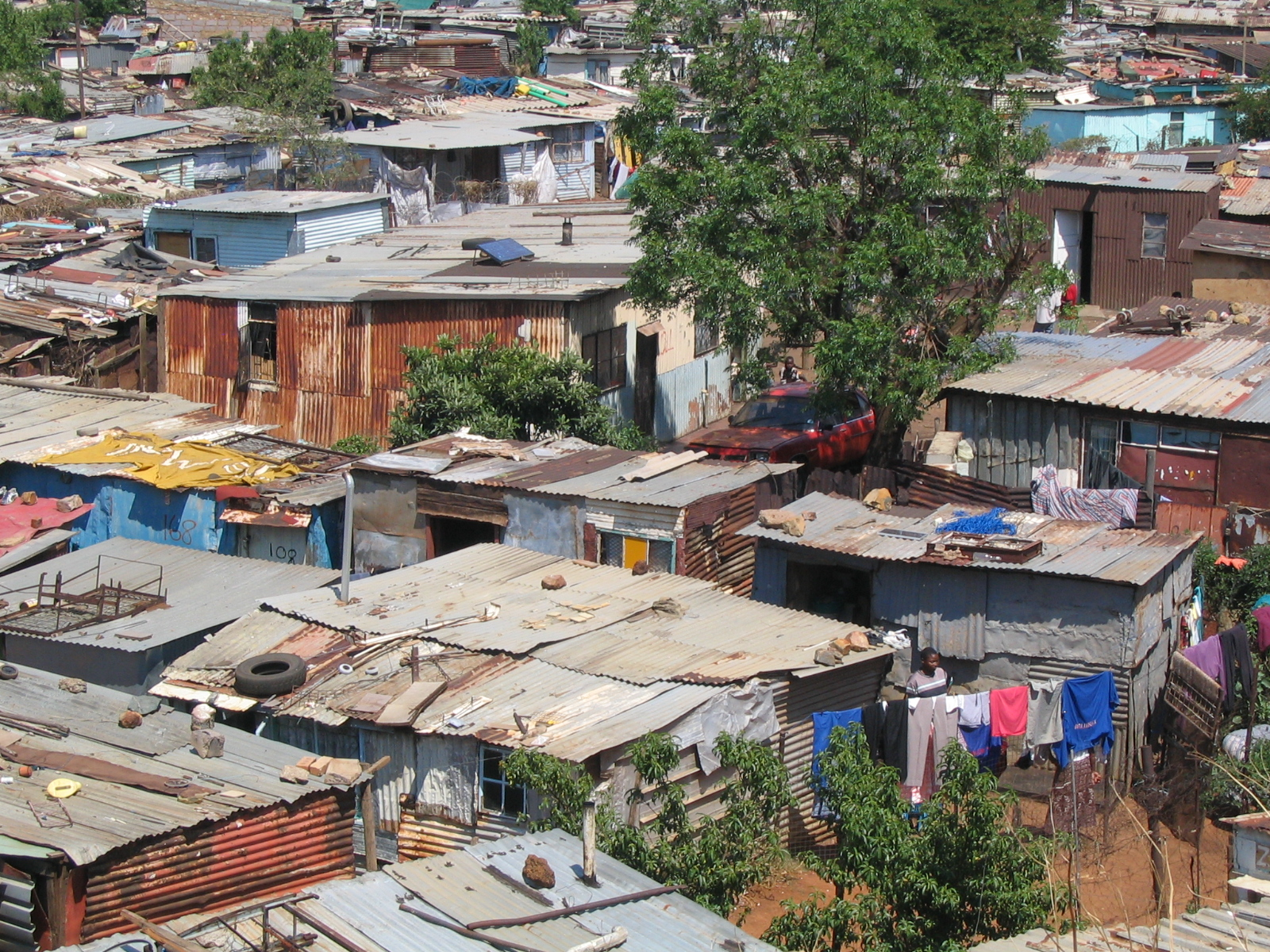
A shanty town in Soweto township

After the Group Areas Act was scrapped in 1991, Johannesburg was affected by urban blight. Thousands of poor black people, who had been forbidden to live in the city proper, moved into the city from surrounding black townships like Soweto and many immigrants from economically beleaguered and wartorn African nations flooded into South Africa. Many buildings were abandoned by landlords, especially in high-density areas, such as Hillbrow. Many corporations and institutions, including the stock exchange, moved their headquarters away from the city centre, to suburbs like Sandton.

Reviving the city centre is one of the main aims of the municipal government of Johannesburg. Drastic measures have been taken to reduce crime in the city. These measures include closed-circuit television on street corners. As of 11 December 2008, every street corner in Johannesburg central is under high-tech CCTV surveillance. The CCTV system, operated by the Johannesburg Metropolitan Police Department (JMPD), is also able to detect stolen or hijacked vehicles by scanning the number plates of every vehicle travelling through the central business district (CBD), then comparing them to the eNaTIS database. The JMPD claims that the average response time by police for crimes committed in the CBD is 60 seconds.

Crime levels in Johannesburg have dropped as the economy has stabilised and begun to grow. Between 2001 and 2006, R9-billion (US$1.2 billion) has been invested in the city centre. Further investment of around R10-billion (US$1.5 billion) is expected in the city centre alone by 2010. This excludes development directly associated with the 2010 FIFA World Cup. In an effort to prepare Johannesburg for the 2010 FIFA World Cup, local government enlisted the help of Rudy Giuliani, former Mayor of New York City, to help bring down the crime rate, as the opening and closing matches of the tournament were played in the city.

Murders in the Johannesburg municipality amounted to 1,697 in 2007 according to the South African Medical Research Council, a rate of 43 per 100,000 inhabitants. In 2016 that number had sharply declined to 29.4 per 100,000 inhabitants, placing the murder rate at more than half of that of Cape Town and even below the national average. However, by 2024, the murder rate per 100,000 inhabitants had risen to 49.02.

== Arts and culture ==
Johannesburg is a cultural hub in South Africa and has a wide variety of cultural venues, making it a prominent area for many creative and cultural industries. Johannesburg is home to the National School of Arts, The University of Witwatersrand's School of the Arts and the South African Ballet Theatre, as well as cultural precincts such as Mary Fitzgerald Square and numerous other museums, theatres, galleries and libraries. The Johannesburg City Library is located in the Central Business District of Johannesburg.

=== Museums and galleries ===
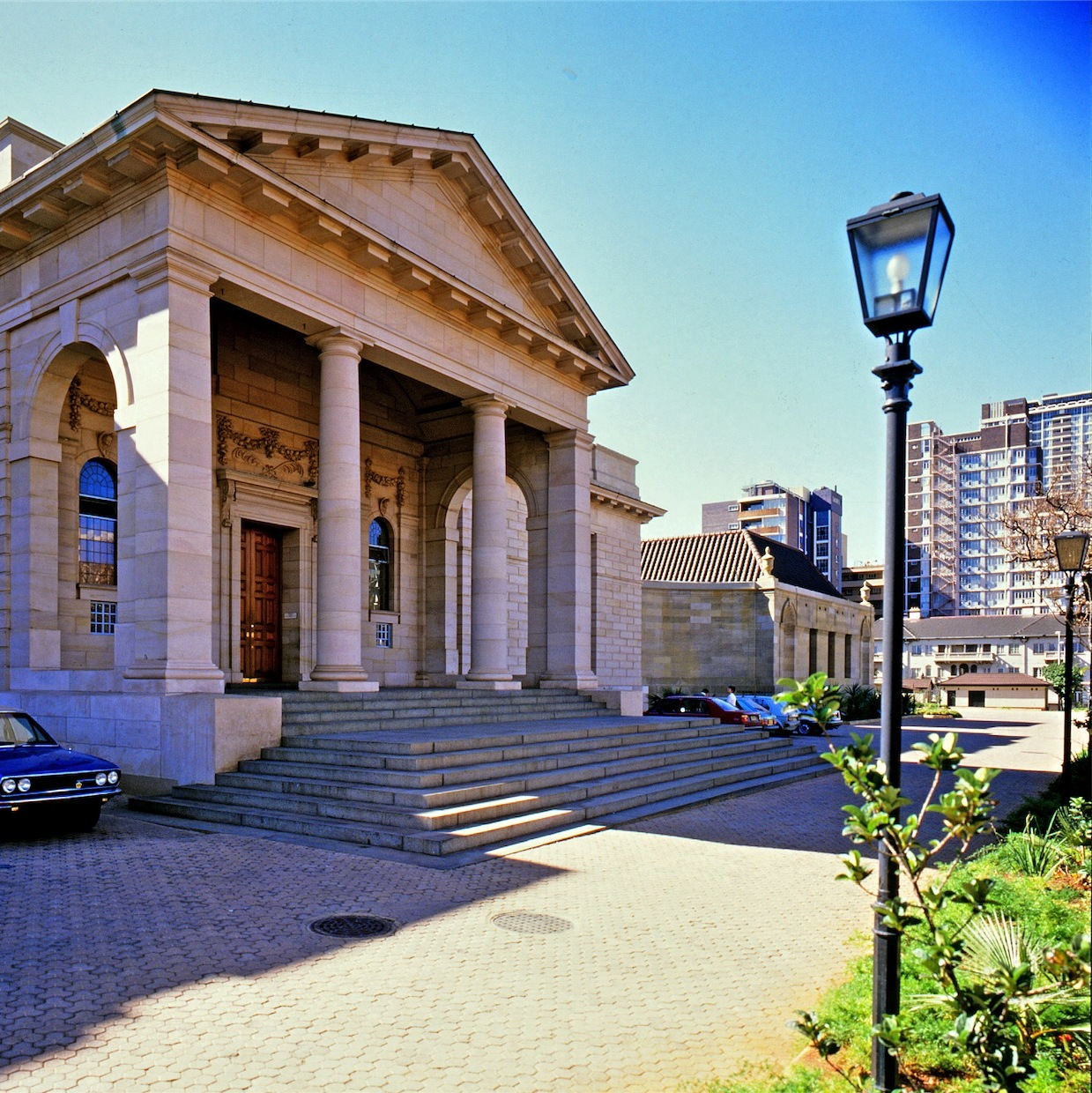
Johannesburg Art Gallery

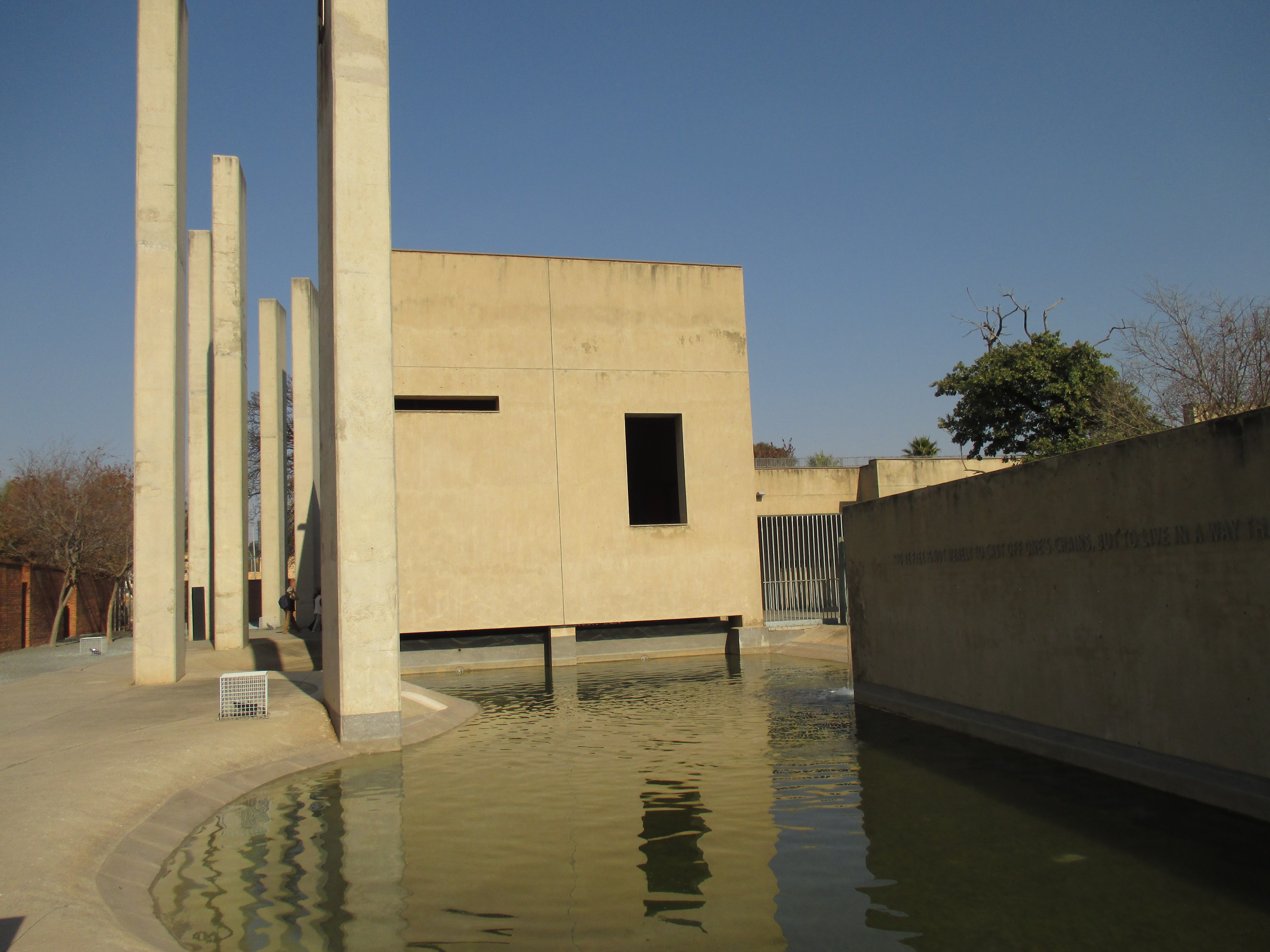
Apartheid Museum

The Johannesburg Art Gallery (JAG) is widely considered among the most notable collections of fine art on the African continent, featuring European and African art from the 15th century to the present. Wits Art Museum in Braamfontein specializes in historic and contemporary African art. Johannesburg is also home to an array of noteworthy private collections and art galleries, largely located in the northern suburbs. These include the Joburg Contemporary Art Foundation (JCAF), Goodman Gallery, Gallery MOMO and the Standard Bank Art Gallery.

Several museums were established since 1994 to remember and educate on South Africa's political history. These include the Apartheid Museum, Constitution Hill, Hector Pieterson Museum and Mandela House. Further, Museum Africa is dedicated to showcasing the continent's history through its Africana collection. Other historical museums include the South African National Museum of Military History, the Johannesburg Holocaust and Genocide Centre and the Workers Museum. The Origins Centre at the University of the Witwatersrand explores the history of humankind and features exhibitions on African sand and rock art.

Specialist museums and collections cover subjects such as Africana, costume, design, fossils, geology, military history, medical, pharmacy, photography and transportation networks such as railways. Notably, the James Hall Museum of Transport features the largest collection on the topic in Africa. Other specialist collections include the AECI Dynamite Factory Museum, the Adler Museum of Medicine, the Credo Mutwa Cultural Village, Madiba Freedom Museum, Bernberg Fashion Museum, and the Zoology Museum.

=== Entertainment and performing arts ===
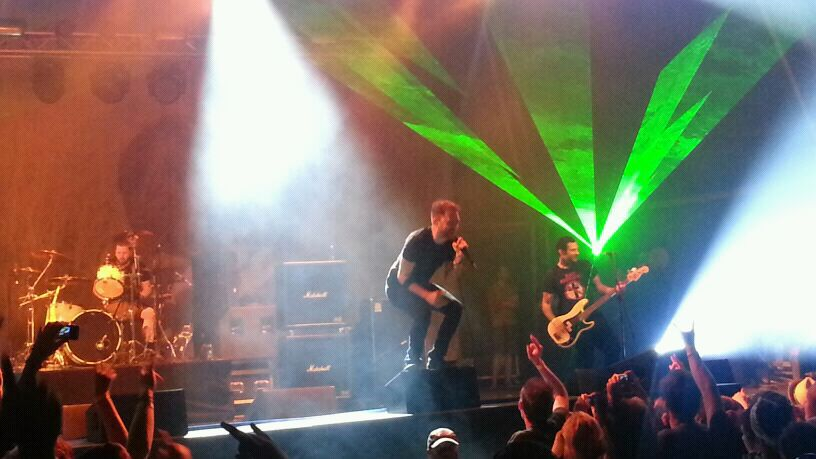
Rise Against performing live in Johannesburg, South Africa, as part of RAMFest 2013

Johannesburg hosts many of South Africa's premier music events, such as RAMFest's Johannesburg leg, In The City and many international tours from bands and artists around the world. Several critically acclaimed musical acts come from Johannesburg, such as Kongos, Johnny Clegg, Trevor Rabin, Zebra & Giraffe, Man As Machine, The Parlotones, and ShortStraw.

The Joburg Theatre complex hosts drama, opera and ballet.

The Market Theatre Foundation houses the historic Market Theatre in Newtown with various sized stages holding performances from theatre to music and dance. The foundation also oversees the Market Theatre Laboratory and The Market Photo Workshop – run training programmes for young creatives and presenting work to the public.

=== Public art ===
Public art ranges from sculptures to murals to pieces by artists like William Kentridge and Gerhard Marx's Fire Walker. Many pieces are developed through community workshops, such as the Vilakazi Street sculptures. Others are functional, such as street furniture found in Hillbrow and the city centre.

As part of the Johannesburg Development Agency's (JDA) policy to make city areas desirable to potential investors, the organisation has identified public art as a way to improve the urban experience of the city. The JDA spends 1 percent of all projects of over R10-million on public art.

=== Architecture and urbanism ===
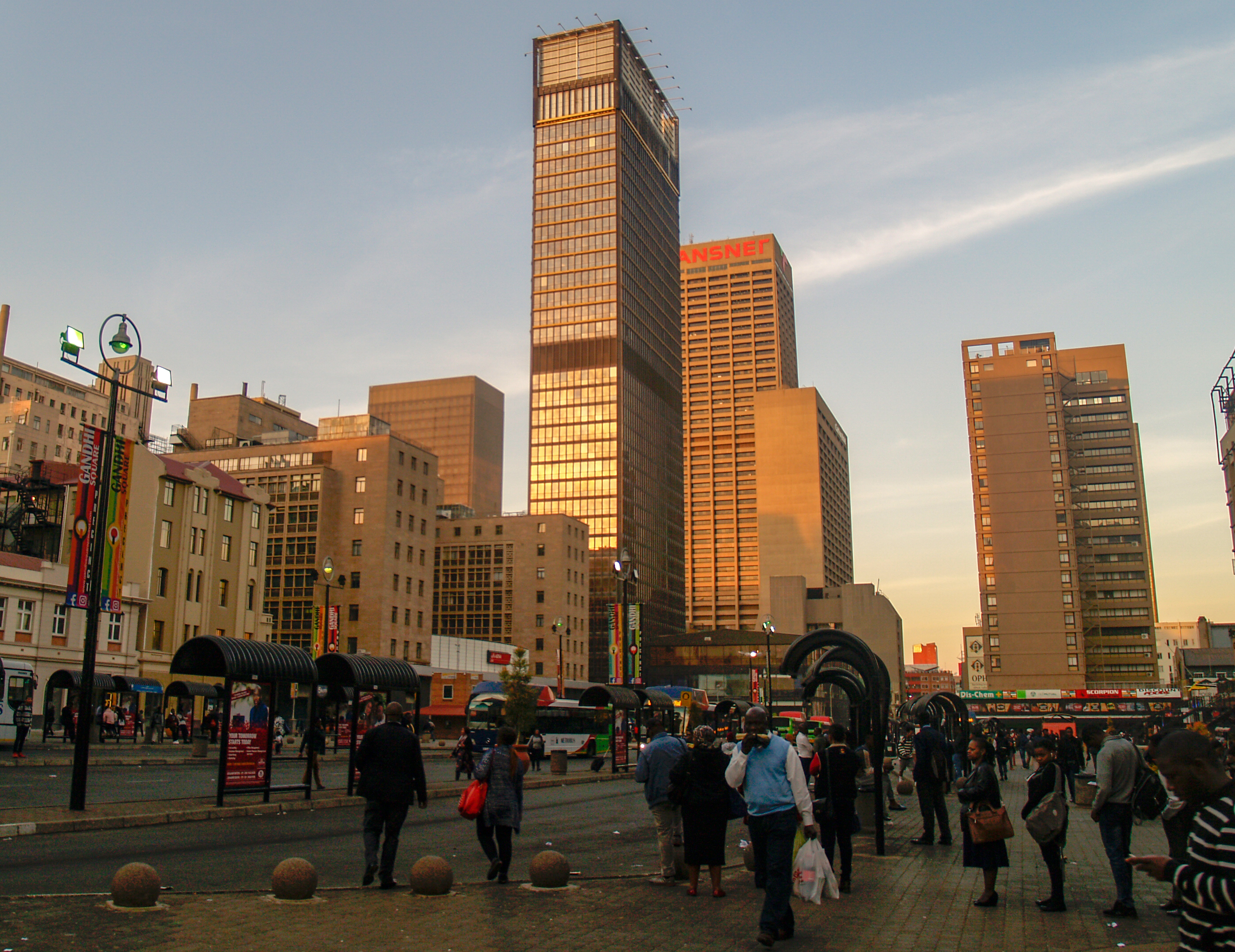
Trust Bank Building in 2018

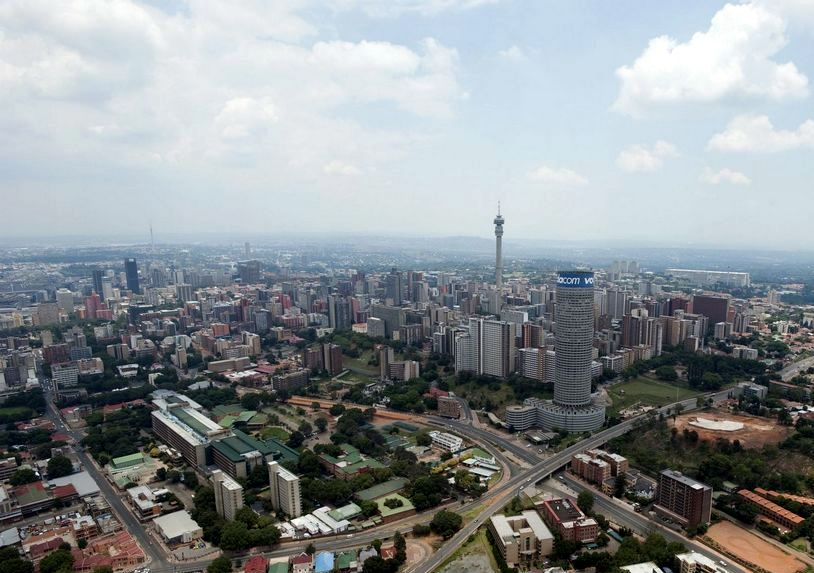
Johannesburg Central Business District

Johannesburg is home to some of Africa's tallest structures, such as the Sentech Tower, Hillbrow Tower, the Carlton Centre and Ponte City Apartments. The Johannesburg city skyline has most of the tallest buildings on the continent and contains most international organisations such as IBM, Absa, BHP, Willis Group, First National Bank, Nedbank and Standard Bank. Many of the city's older buildings have been demolished and more modern ones built in their place. North of the CBD is Hillbrow, the most densely populated residential area in southern Africa. Northwest of the CBD is Braamfontein, a secondary CBD housing many offices and business premises. The CBD is predominated by four styles of architecture, being Victorian Colonial, Edwardian Baroque, Art Deco and Modernism.

The city is often described as Africa's economic powerhouse, and contentiously as a modern and prosperous African city. Johannesburg, like many metropolises, has more than one central business district (CBD), including, but not limited to, Sandton, Rosebank and Roodepoort in addition to the original CBD. Some tend to include Benoni and Germiston as well.

Due to its many different central districts, Johannesburg would fall under the multiple nuclei model in human geography terms. It is the hub of South Africa's commercial, financial, industrial, and mining undertakings. Johannesburg is part of a larger urban region. It is closely linked with several other satellite towns. Randburg and Sandton form part of the northern area. The east and west ridges spread out from central Johannesburg. The Central Business District covers an area of 6 square kilometres (2 sq mi). It consists of closely packed skyscrapers such as the Carlton Centre, Marble Towers, Trust Bank Building, Ponte City Apartments, Southern Life Centre and 11 Diagonal Street.

Johannesburg's city centre retains its elements of a rectangular grid pattern that was first officially recorded in 1886. Streets are narrow and filled with high rises built in the mid- to late 1900s. Old Victorian–era buildings first built in the late 1800s have been torn down long ago. The 1900s brought along with it the introduction of many different architectural styles and structures. The Johannesburg Art Gallery and Supreme Court Building being two examples. These were important Beaux-Arts structures, with the style put in place by (at the time) colonial parent, the British Empire. South Africa did not borrow architectural techniques exclusively from Britain, however. They were also inspired by American models and styles, having built several structures like the ESKOM Building and the Corner House to emulate the prowess of New York City, located in the United States.

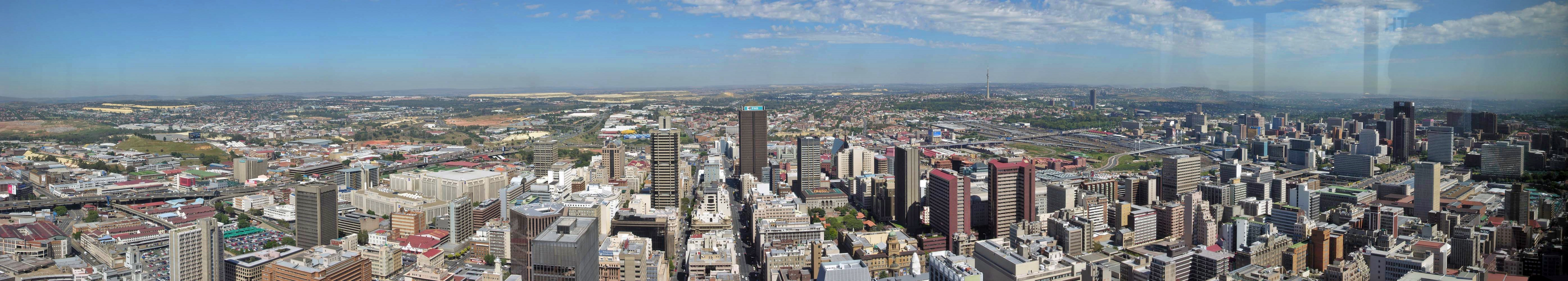
Panoramic view of the Johannesburg Central Business District

=== Sports ===
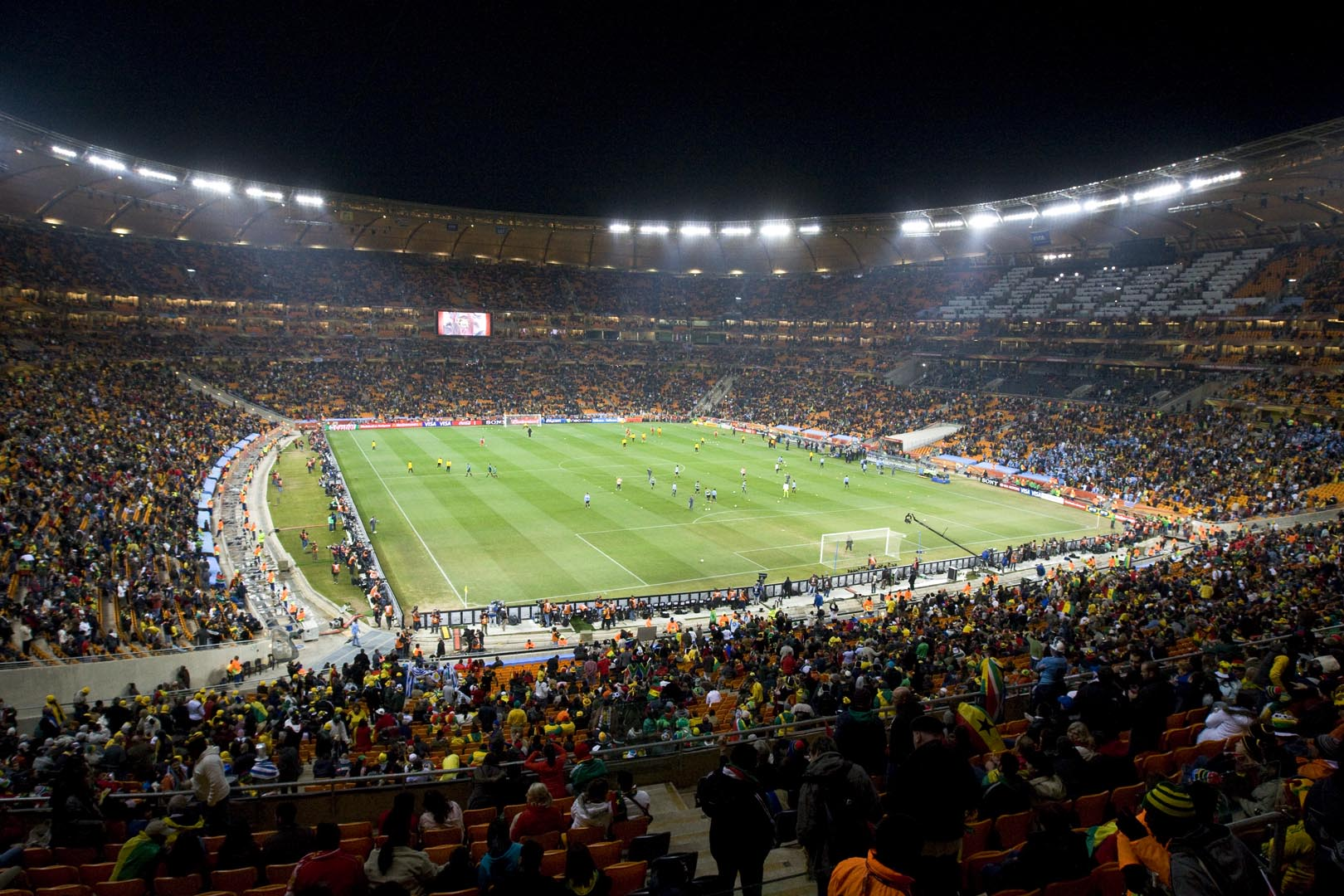
Uruguay vs. Ghana at the FNB Stadium, during the 2010 FIFA World Cup

Johannesburg's most popular sports by participation are association football, cricket, rugby union, and running. Early each Sunday morning, tens of thousands of runners gather to take part in informal runs organised by several athletic clubs.

The city has several football clubs in the Premiership and the National First Division. In the Premiership, the top Johannesburg teams are all fierce rivals and include Kaizer Chiefs (nicknamed Amakhosi) and Orlando Pirates (nicknamed the Buccaneers). They are based at the city's FNB and Orlando stadiums. Several large-scale league and cup games are played at Soccer City the venue of the 2010 FIFA World Cup final. First Division teams are Jomo Cosmos and FC AK. Katlehong City and Alexandra United, play at Alexandra and Reiger Park stadium respectively.

Cricket is one of the more popular sports. In cricket, the Highveld Lions represent Johannesburg, the rest of Gauteng as well as the North West at the Wanderers Stadium which was the venue for the 2003 Cricket World Cup Final in which Australia successfully defended their title against India. Wanderers Stadium hosted what many cricket fans consider the greatest ever ODI match in which South Africa successfully chased down 434 runs. They take part in the first class SuperSport Series, the one-day MTN Domestic Championship and the Twenty20 Ram Slam T20 Challenge. Johannesburg also hosted matches from and the final of the 2007 ICC World Twenty20, in which India beat Pakistan in the final.

The Lions, formerly the Cats, represent Johannesburg, North West and Mpumalanga in the United Rugby Championship competition, which includes teams from South Africa, Ireland, Italy, Scotland and Wales. The Golden Lions compete in the Currie Cup, which they have won on ten occasions. They are housed at Ellis Park Stadium, which also hosted the 1995 Rugby World Cup final, in which the South African Springboks defeated the New Zealand All Blacks.

The city's Ticketpro Dome and the Ellis Park Arena hosted two of the three NBA Africa Games.

== Infrastructure ==
=== Transportation ===
Johannesburg is a developing city, with its public transportation built in its infancy, geared towards private motorists, and lacks a convenient public transportation system. The City though has invested a large percentage of its budget toward an integrated public transportation system. A significant number of the city's residents are dependent on the city's informal minibus taxis.

==== Roads ====
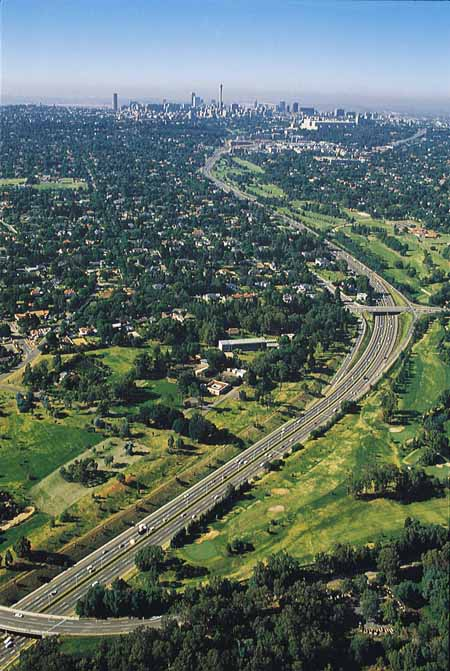
The M1 is a major freeway in Johannesburg

Johannesburg shares a network of metropolitan routes with Krugersdorp and Ekurhuleni. The fact that Johannesburg is not near a large navigable body of water has meant that ground transportation has been the most important method of transporting people and goods in and out of the city. One of Africa's most famous "beltways" or ring roads/orbitals is the Johannesburg Ring Road. The road is composed of three freeways that converge on the city, forming an 80-kilometre (50 mi) loop around it: the N3 Eastern Bypass, the N1 Western Bypass and the N12 Southern Bypass. The N3 was built exclusively with asphalt, while the N12 and N1 sections were made with concrete, hence the nickname given to the N1 Western Bypass, "The Concrete Highway". In spite of being up to 12 lanes wide in some areas, the Johannesburg Ring Road is frequently clogged with traffic. The Gillooly's Interchange (renamed George Bizos Interchange in 2021), built on an old farm and the point at which the N3 Eastern Bypass and the R24 Airport Freeway intersect, is the busiest interchange in the Southern Hemisphere. It is claimed that the N1 is the busiest road in South Africa.

Johannesburg has a lot of freeways connected to it. The N1 connects northwards to Pretoria and Polokwane and southwards to Bloemfontein and Cape Town. The N3 connects south-east to Durban. The N12 connects westwards to Potchefstroom and Kimberley and eastwards to eMalahleni. The N14 passes at the north-western corner of the Johannesburg Municipality, connecting Pretoria with Krugersdorp. The N17 connects eastwards to Ermelo and Eswatini. The R21 connects the East Rand and O. R. Tambo International Airport with Pretoria. The R24 connects the Johannesburg CBD with the airport. The R59 connects southwards to Vereeniging and Sasolburg. The M1 connects the Johannesburg CBD with the northern suburbs and the southern suburbs. The M2 connects the Johannesburg CBD with the Germiston CBD to the east. The M1 and M2 freeways are congested due to mass urbanisation.

Johannesburg also has a lot of non-freeway routes that connect to other towns and cities. The R24 connects the Johannesburg city centre with Roodepoort, Krugersdorp and Rustenburg to the west. The R25 connects Johannesburg's northern suburbs with Modderfontein and Kempton Park to the north-east. The R29 connects the city centre with Germiston, Boksburg and Benoni to the east. The R41 connects the city centre with Roodepoort and Randfontein to the west. The R55 connects Sandton with Pretoria West to the north. The R82 connects Johannesburg with Vereeniging to the south. The R101 connects Sandton with Midrand, Centurion and Pretoria to the north. The R511 connects Sandton with Diepsloot and Hartbeespoort to the north. The R512 connects Randburg with Lanseria International Airport and Hartbeespoort to the north.

==== Bus and taxi transit ====
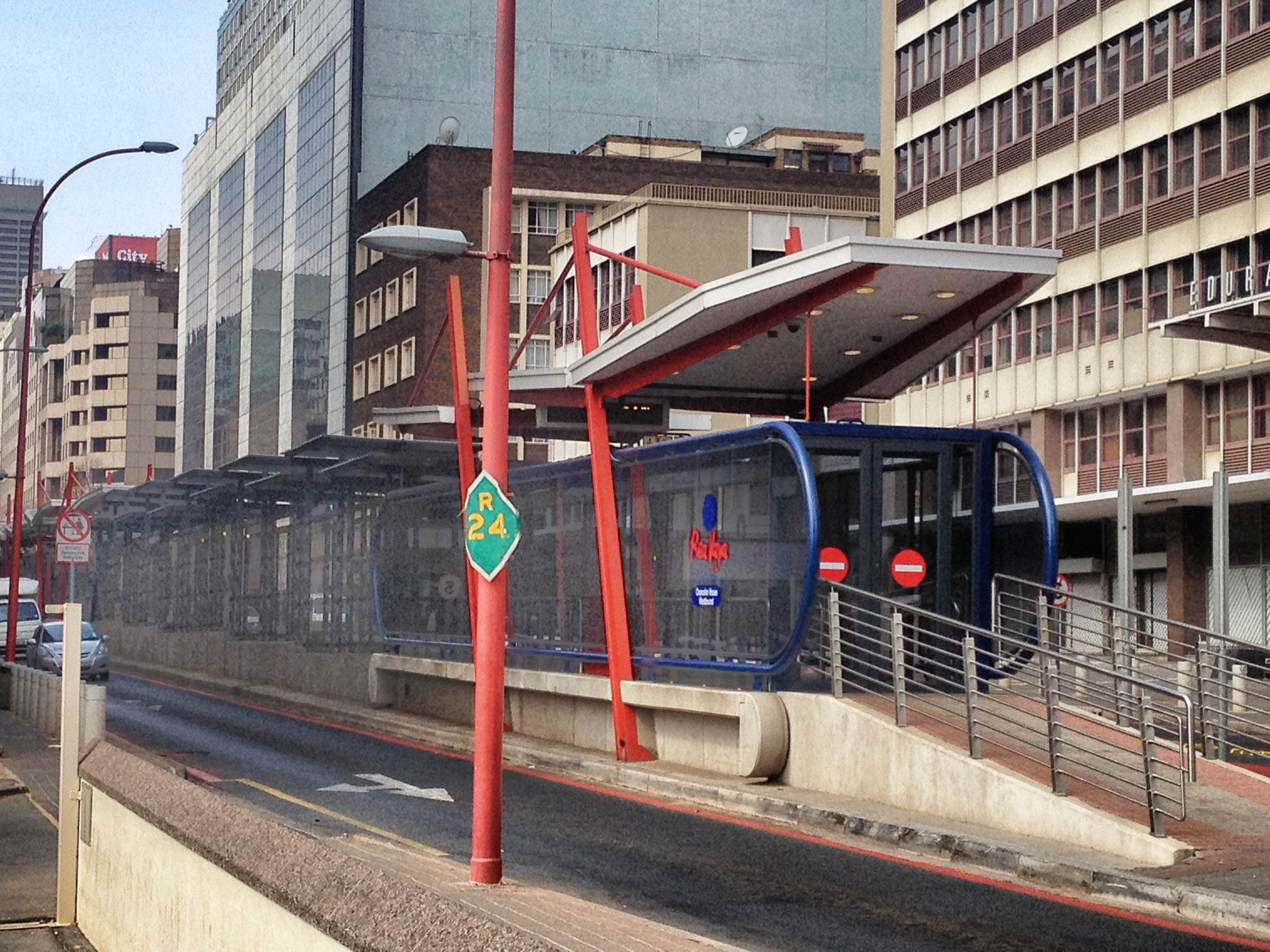
Rea Vaya bus stop in Johannesburg CBD in Commissioner Street at Ntemi Piliso Street

Johannesburg is served by a bus fleet operated by MetroBus, a corporate unit of the City of Johannesburg. It has a fleet consisting of approximately 550 single and double-decker buses, plying 84 different routes in the city. This total includes 200 modern buses (150 double-deckers and 50 single-deckers), made by Volvo, Scania AB and Marcopolo/Brasa in 2002. Metrobus' fleet carries approximately 20 million passengers per annum. In addition, there are a number of private bus operators, though most focus on the inter-city routes, or on bus charters for touring groups. The city's main bus terminus is situated in Gandhi Square, where passengers can also obtain information regarding the Metrobus service from the walk-in customer information desk.

In 2010, in order to create an efficient public transport system, the Rea Vaya bus rapid system was developed/built. The buses run on their own dedicated bus lanes on the main trunk and complementary routes. The buses also have large feeder routes that run on ordinary roads. The Rea Vaya works on a smartcard payment system. Upon entering the station or bus, the passenger taps his/her smartcard onto the validator/scanner and taps out at the next station with the calculated amount. The routes cover both the southern and northern suburbs with the main trunk route running from Soweto to Sandton and Rosebank, and the feeder and complementary routes covering most of Johannesburg, with the notable exceptions of Midrand and Centurion. A subsequent expansion (phase 1-C;1-D) will cover these areas. In 2017, the Rea Vaya bus rapid transit was recorded to be making huge losses recovering only about 40 per cent of the operating costs and relying heavily on government subsidies.

Johannesburg has two kinds of taxis, metered taxis and minibus taxis. Unlike many cities, metered taxis are not allowed to drive around the city looking for passengers and instead must be called and ordered to a destination. The Gauteng Provincial Government has launched a new metered taxi programme in an attempt to increase the use of metered taxis in the city.

The minibus "taxis" are the de facto standard and essential form of transport for the majority of the population. Since the 1980s, the minibus taxi industry has been severely affected by turf wars.

==== Airports ====
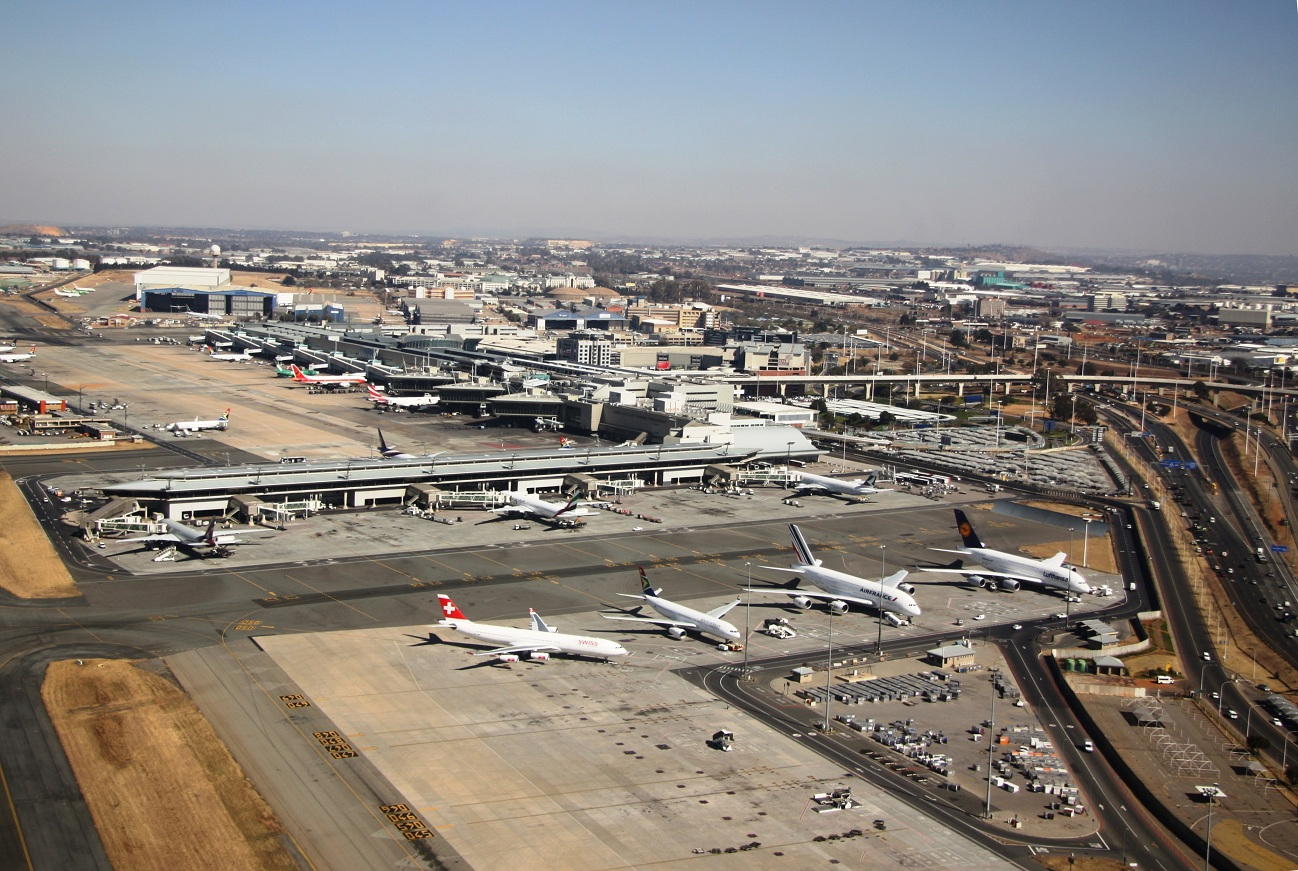
O. R. Tambo International Airport

Johannesburg is served principally by O. R. Tambo International Airport (formerly Johannesburg International Airport and before that Jan Smuts Airport) for both domestic and international flights. Lanseria Airport, located to the north-west of the city and closer to the business hub of Sandton, is used for commercial flights to Cape Town, Durban, Port Elizabeth, Botswana, and Sun City. Other airports include Rand Airport and Grand Central Airport. Rand Airport, located in Germiston, is a small airfield used mostly for private aircraft and the home of South African Airways' first Boeing 747–200 ZS-SAN and also 747SP ZS-SPC and now serves as an aviation museum. Grand Central is located in Midrand and also caters to small, private aircraft.

==== Rail ====
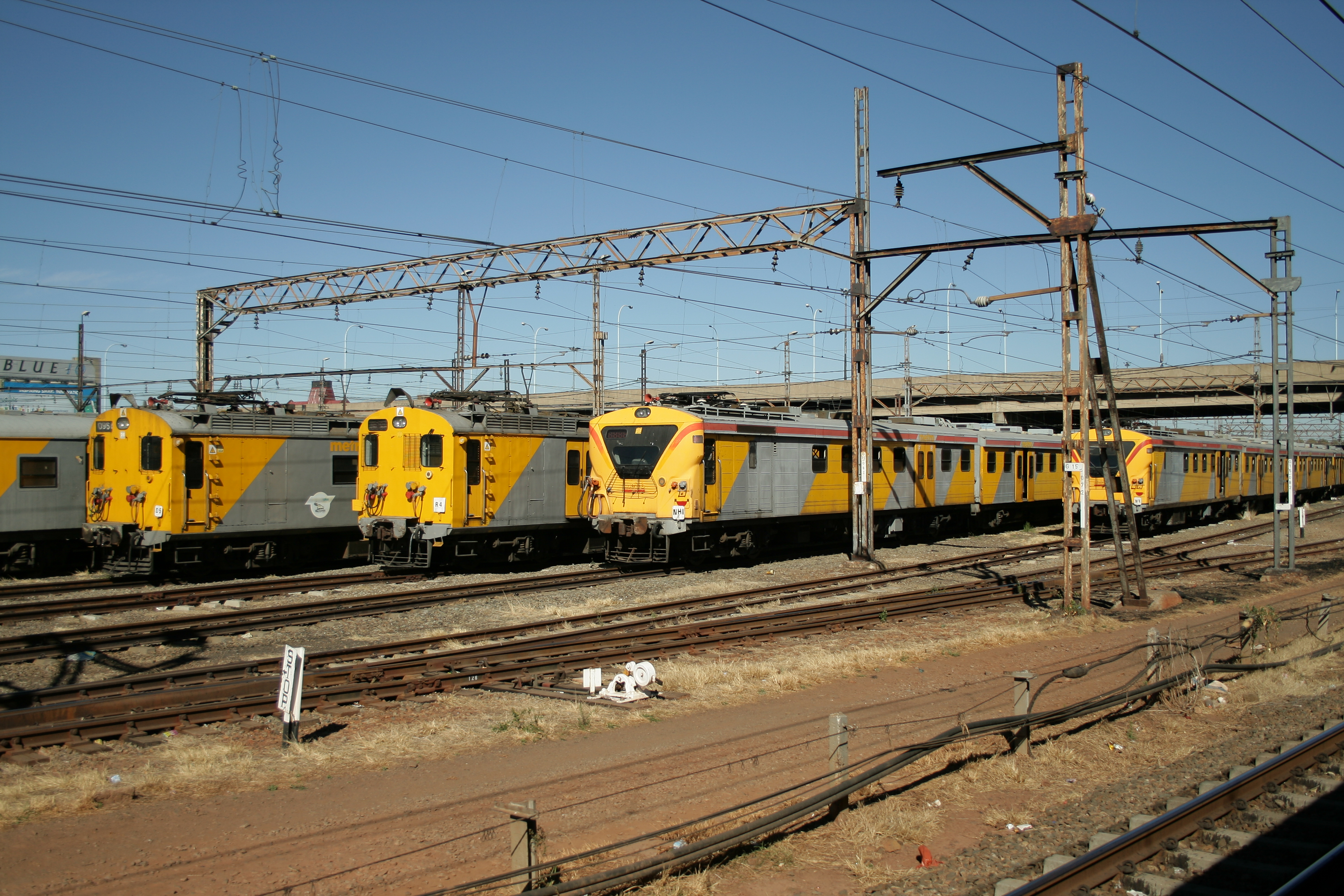
Metrorail Gauteng at Braamfontein, Johannesburg

The Metrorail Gauteng commuter rail system connects central Johannesburg to Soweto, Pretoria, and most of the satellite towns along the Witwatersrand. The railways transport huge numbers of commuters every day. However, the Metrorail infrastructure was built in Johannesburg's infancy and covers only the older areas in the city's south. The northern areas, including the business districts of Sandton, Midrand, Randburg, and Rosebank, are served by the rapid rail link Gautrain.

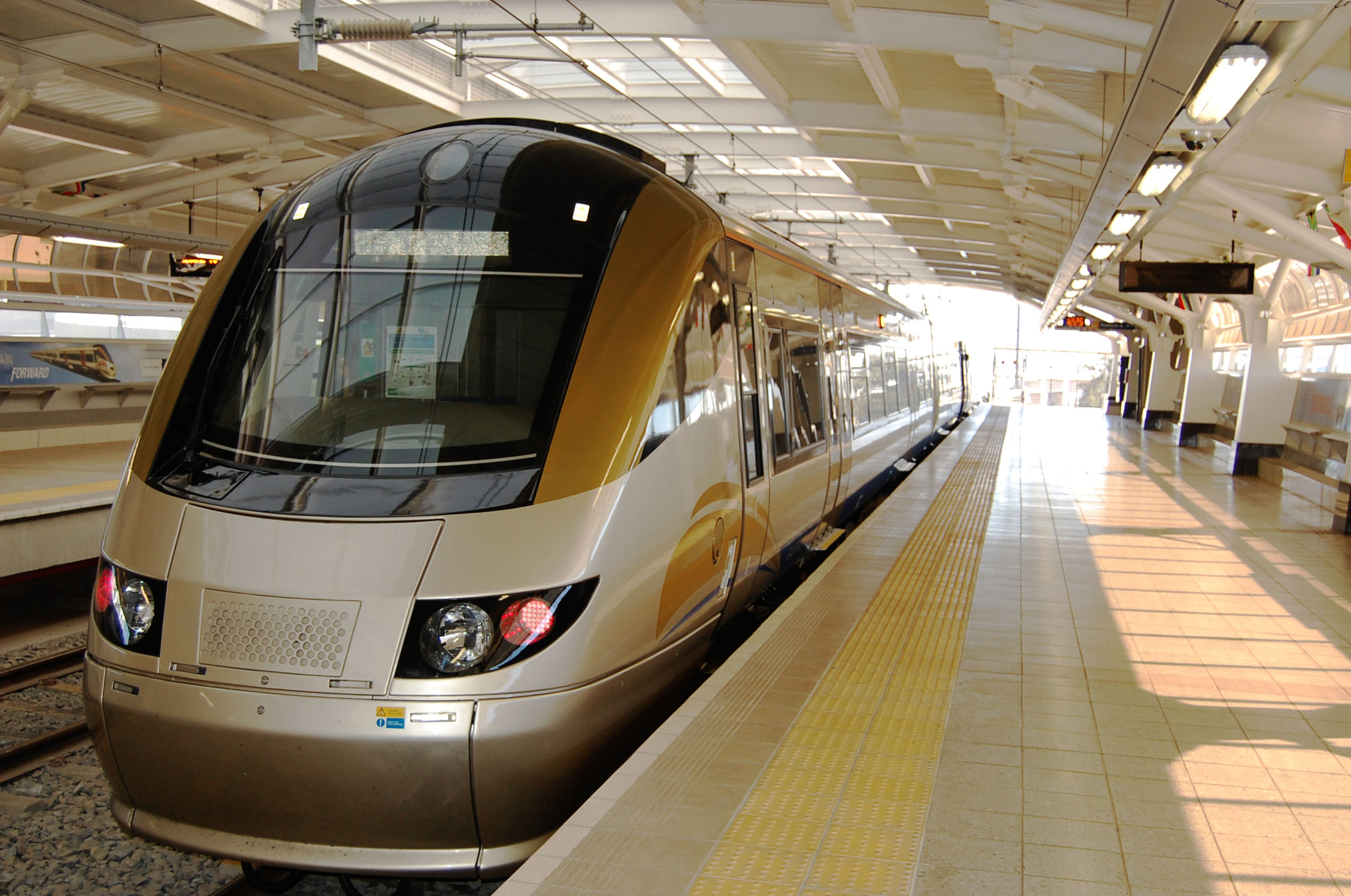
Gautrain station at OR Tambo Airport

A part of the Gauteng Provincial Government's Blue IQ Project, Gautrain has made provision for a rapid rail link, running north to south, between Johannesburg and Pretoria, and west to east between Sandton and the OR Tambo International Airport. Construction of the Gautrain Rapid Rail started in October 2006 and was completed in June 2012. It consists of a number of underground stations, as well as above-ground stations. Stations on the north–south line include Johannesburg's Park Station (underground), Rosebank (underground), Sandton (underground), Marlboro (above-ground and raised), Midrand, Pretoria Station and Hatfield. There is also a line from the O.R. Tambo International Airport (above-ground and raised) travelling to Sandton via Rhodesfield (raised) and Marlboro. A 200-kilometre expansion is underway and will consist of 3 new lines and 18 new stations, and is expected to cost R18 billion and one-lines (Soweto Mamalodi) could take 4 years to build, most of the new stations will be in the Johannesburg Metropolitan Municipality. Several lines will be added including a line running from Marlboro to Soweto station at Sandton, as well as new stations at Randburg, Cosmo City, Little Falls, Roodepoort and Jabulani in between.

The east–west line from the airport to Sandton opened in June 2010 in time for the 2010 FIFA World Cup, while the north–south line opened on 2 August 2011, except for Park Station, which opened in 2012.

The rail system was designed to alleviate traffic on the N1 freeway between Johannesburg and Pretoria, which records vehicle loads of up to 300,000 per week day. An extensive bus feeder system has also been implemented, which allows access to the main stations from the outer suburbs, but is limited to a five-kilometre radius, which neglects the rest of the suburbs. This is the first new major railway system that has been laid in South Africa since 1977.

In 2010, a high-speed rail link was proposed between Johannesburg and Durban.

==== Freight ====
City Deep Terminal is the name of Africa's largest dry port and was officially opened by the South African Railways Services (SARS) in 1977. The container terminal is connected to the Port of Durban, Port of Ngqurha, Port of Cape Town, as well as Southern Africa by road and rail. At least forty percent of container export/imports run on the Natal Corridor (Natcor) which is directly linked by rail to City Deep.

=== Telecommunication ===
Johannesburg has 4 major cellular telecommunications operators: Vodacom, MTN, Cell C, and Telkom Mobile. Vodacom's global headquarters is located in Midrand. It was formed in 1994, just after the South African elections of 1994.

=== Media ===
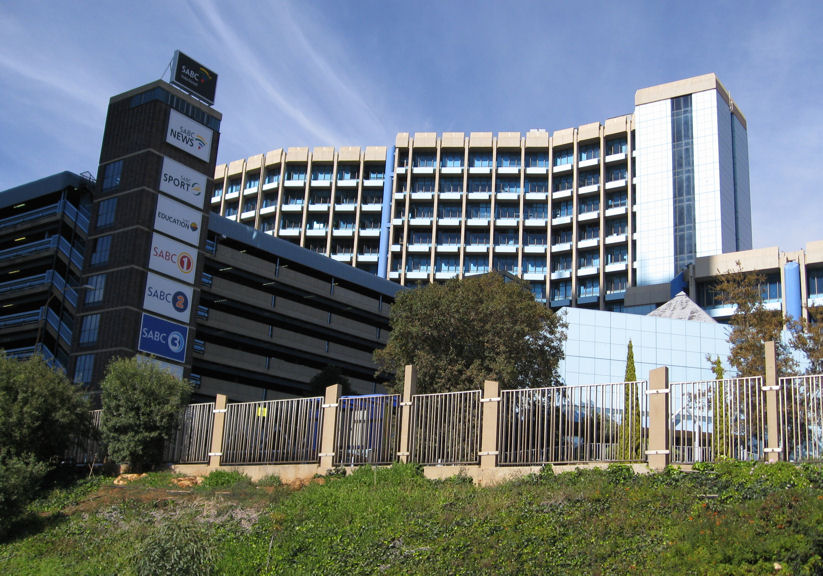
South African Broadcasting Corporation headquarters in Uitsaaisentrum, Johannesburg

Johannesburg has a number of regional radio stations such as 94.7 Highveld Stereo, Radiokansel / Radio Pulpit, Kaya FM, Radio 2000, YFM, Metro FM, 5FM, Jacaranda FM, SAfm, Phalaphala FM, Radio 702 and UJFM.

Johannesburg is also the headquarters of state-owned broadcaster South African Broadcasting Corporation and pay-broadcast network Multichoice which distributes M-Net and DStv a digital satellite service, while eTV also has a presence in the city. The city has two television towers, the Hillbrow Tower and the Sentech Tower.

== International relations ==
=== Twin towns – sister cities ===
Johannesburg is twinned with:

- Addis Ababa, Ethiopia
- Biratnagar, Nepal
- Beijing, China
- Birmingham, United Kingdom
- Montreal, Canada
- New York City, United States
- Ramallah, Palestine
- Rio de Janeiro, Brazil
- Shanghai, China
- Windhoek, Namibia

=== Partner cities ===
Johannesburg is cooperating with:

- Accra, Ghana
- (Democratic Republic of the Congo) Kinshasa, DR Congo
- Matola, Mozambique
- Saint Petersburg, Russia
- Val-de-Marne, France
