= Rhodesfield (Gautrain station) =

Railway station near Johannesburg, South Africa

General information
- Coordinates: 26.128112°S 28.225046°E
- System: Gautrain rapid transit station Metrorail commuter rail station
- Line: East–West Line Johannesburg–Pretoria
- Platforms: 2 side platforms
- Tracks: 2

Construction
- Accessible: yes

History
- Opened: 8 June 2010

Services
Preceding station	Gautrain	Following station
Marlboro towards Sandton	East–West Line	OR Tambo Terminus
Preceding station	Metrorail Gauteng	Following station
Isando towards Johannesburg	Johannesburg–Pretoria	Kempton Park towards Pretoria or Leralla
Location

Rhodesfield is a metro station on the Gautrain rapid transit and Metrorail systems in Rhodesfield, Kempton Park, Gauteng, to the east of Johannesburg. It opened on 8 June 2010 with service to Sandton.

== Location ==
Rhodesfield station is located in the suburb of the same name in Kempton Park, a city in Ekurhuleni in eastern Gauteng. Specifically, it is at the corner of Anson and Valencia Streets, north of the nearby R24 highway.

== Station layout ==
Rhodesfield station uses a simple side platform layout with two tracks.

== Services ==
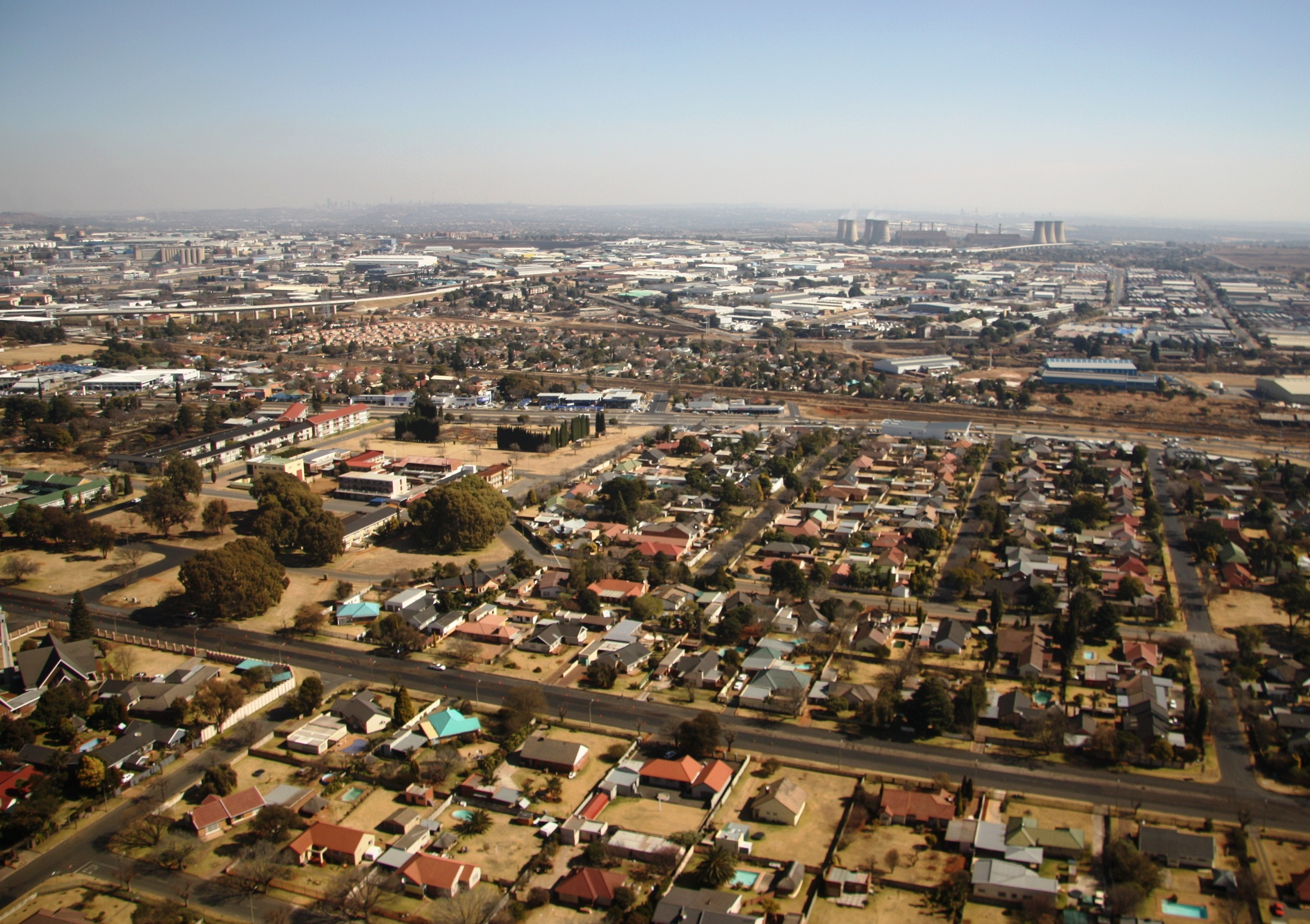
The Rhodesfield suburb of Kempton Park

=== Rail service ===
Rhodesfield is one of the two eastern termini of the Airport Line. Essentially, it acts as the commuter rail variant of the close by OR Tambo International Airport station. Trains from the airport stop at Rhodesfield, but the carriages holding passengers from the preceding station do not open their doors.

One of four stations to have a connection to the Johannesburg Metrorail system, Rhodesfield acts as a transfer point, with PRASA having built a new Rhodesfield station. However, the Gautrain and PRASA stations are physically separate, with the former requiring smart-card entry for fare and security reasons.

=== Bus service ===
Similar to other Gautrain stations, Rhodesfield is served by an integrated feeder bus route. Known as RF1, the bus travels in a circular route around southern Kempton Park.
