= Rhodesfield =

- Location within Gauteng Location within South Africa
- Coordinates: 26°7′42″S 28°13′30″E
- Country: South Africa
- Province: Gauteng
- Municipality: Ekurhuleni
- Main Place: Kempton Park

Area
  - Total: 2.33 km^{2} (0.90 sq mi)

Population (2011)
  - Total: 5,215
  - Density: 2,240/km^{2} (5,800/sq mi)

Racial makeup (2011)
  - Black African: 56.1%
  - Coloured: 4.3%
  - Indian/Asian: 4.0%
  - White: 35.2%
  - Other: 0.4%

First languages (2011)
  - Afrikaans: 31.3%
  - English: 26.3%
  - Zulu: 9.4%
  - Northern Sotho: 6.2%
  - Other: 26.8%
- Time zone: UTC+2 (SAST)
- Postal code (street): 1619
- PO box: --
- Area code: 011

Rhodesfield is a suburb central to Kempton Park, in Gauteng province, South Africa, just south of the CBD. It houses the last station on the Gautrain route to OR Tambo International Airport from Sandton.

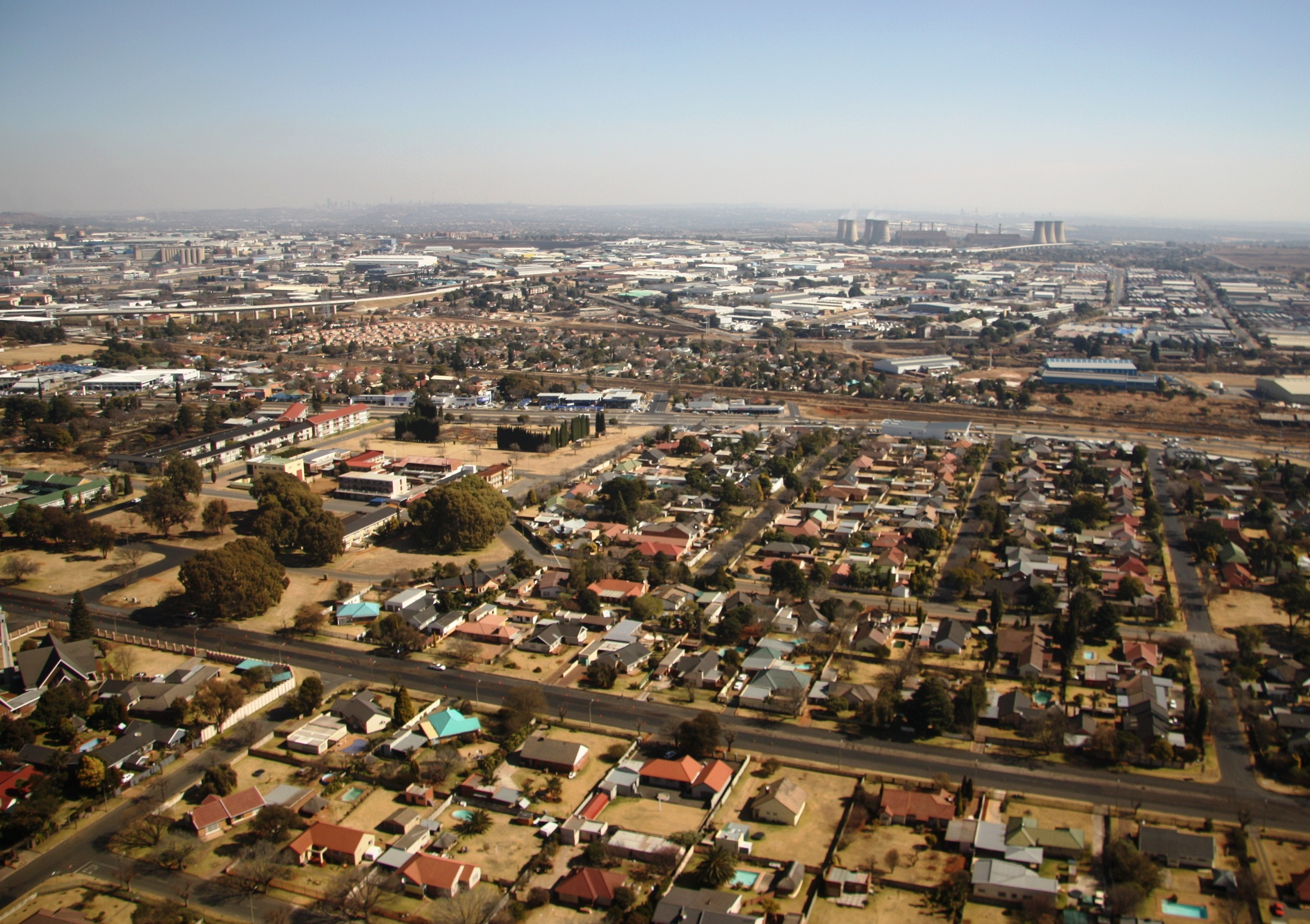
Rhodesfield

== Rail service ==
Rhodesfield is one of the two eastern termini of the Gautrain Airport Line, at the corner of Anson Street and Valencia Street. Essentially, it acts as the commuter rail variant of the close by OR Tambo International Airport station. Trains from the airport stop at Rhodesfield, but the carriages holding passengers from the preceding station do not open their doors.

One of four stations to have a connection to the Johannesburg Metrorail system, Rhodesfield acts as a transfer point, with PRASA having built a new Rhodesfield station. However, the Gautrain and PRASA stations are physically separate, with the former requiring smart-card entry for fare and security reasons.

== Bus service ==
Similar to other Gautrain stations, Rhodesfield is served by an integrated feeder bus route. Known as RF1, the bus travels in a circular route around southern Kempton Park.
