= Centurion (Gautrain station) =

Railway station in Gauteng, South Africa

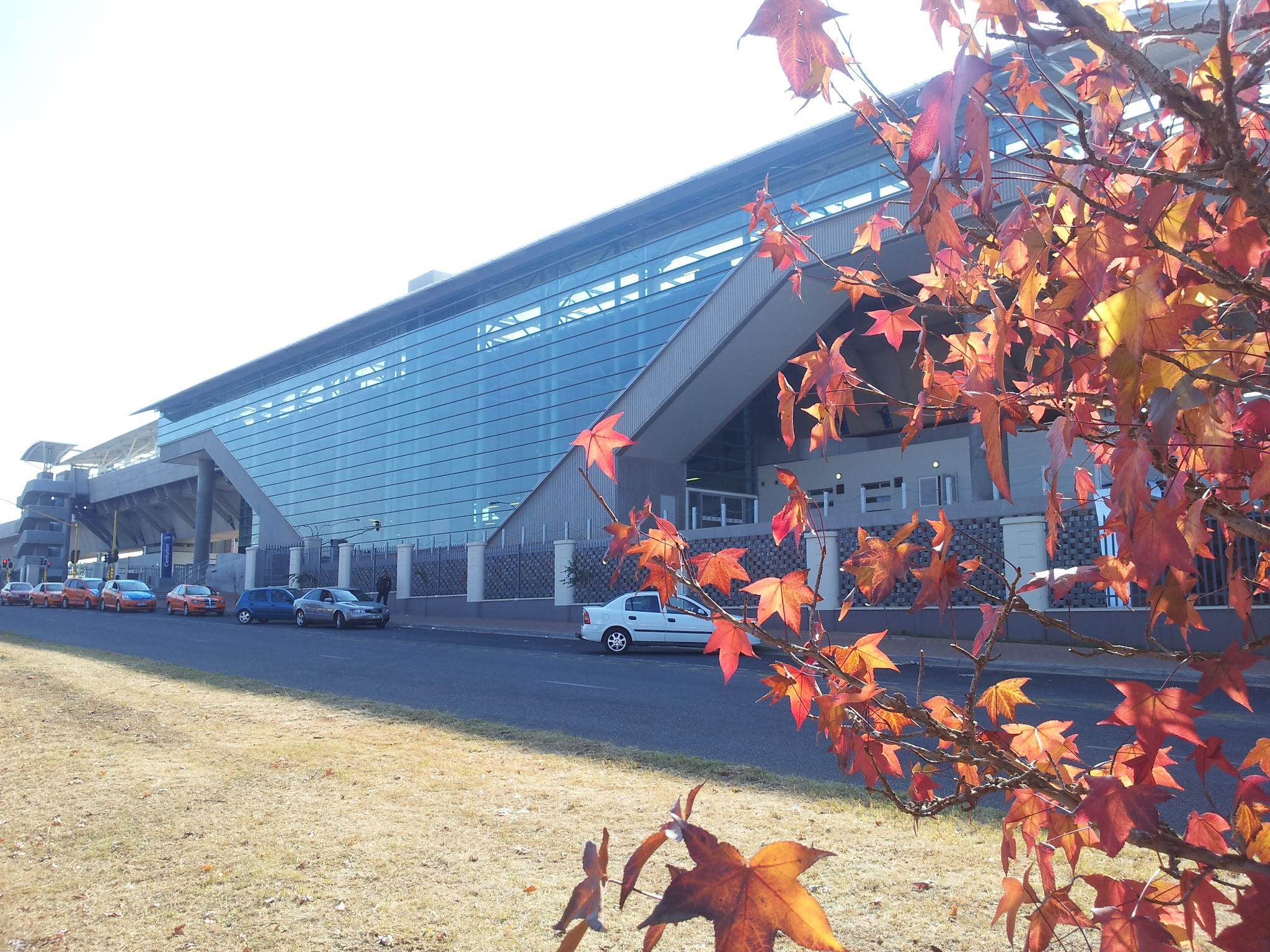
- The Centurion station as viewed from West Avenue

General information
- Location: Corner of West Avenue and Hendrik Verwoerd Drive; Centurion, Gauteng
- Coordinates: 25.851210°S 28.18957°E
- System: Gautrain rapid transit station
- Line: North–South Line
- Platforms: 2 side platforms
- Tracks: 2

Construction
- Accessible: yes

History
- Opened: 2 August 2011

Services
Preceding station	Gautrain	Following station
Midrand towards Park Station	North–South Line	Pretoria towards Hatfield
Location

Centurion is a metro station on the Gautrain rapid transit system in Centurion, Gauteng. The station opened on 2 August 2011 as part of the second phase of the Gautrain project.

== Location ==
Centurion station is located in the town of Centurion, in the southern part of the City of Tshwane Metropolitan Municipality. The station is located adjacent to West Avenue which runs along the northern bank of Centurion Lake.

=== Transit-oriented development ===
In common with other Gautrain stations, Centurion station acts as the focal point of transit-oriented development. The most prominent of the initiatives near the station is the Centurion Symbio-City development, which aims at developing the highest skyscraper in Africa in the middle of Centurion Lake.

== Station layout ==
Centurion station has two tracks with two side platforms and parking for 2000 cars. Due to high demand for parking and a lot of rail users having to park outside the station, the Bombela Consortium purchased additional land to build additional parking in Von Willich Avenue on the Northern side of the station.

== Services ==
Trains on the North-South Line of the Gautrain system serve Centurion station, running northbound to Pretoria and Hatfield and southbound to Midrand, Sandton and Johannesburg Park Station. In addition, Centurion has four integrated feeder bus routes to Highveld (CEN1), Rooihuiskraal (CEN2), Wierdapark (CEN3), and Southdowns (CEN4).
