= Rosebank Public Library =

Public library in Rosebank

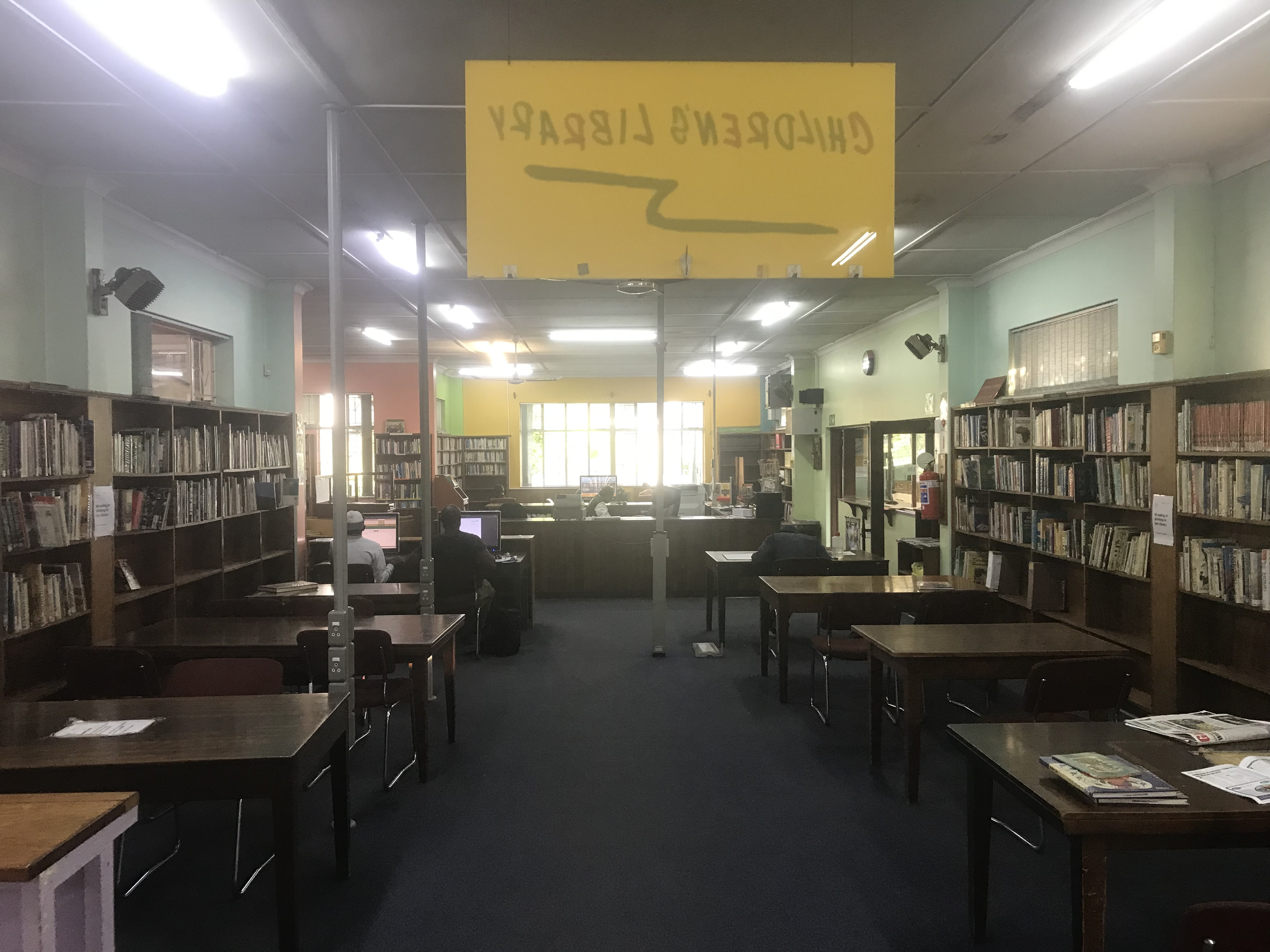
Interior of Rosebank Public Library

Rosebank Public Library is a public library in Rosebank, South Africa, at the southern end of Keyes Art Mile. It is situated near the Rosebank Mall and the Rosebank Gautrain station. Among other services, the library offers free access to the Internet, including wifi. During the school holidays, Rosebank Library hosts regular programs and events aimed at children. The Friends of the Rosebank Public Library raises money for the library.

== History ==
The City of Johannesburg Engineers Department established Rosebank library in 1955.

It was earmarked for demolition in 2018 by the Johannesburg Property Company, which manages an R8,6 billion property portfolio, on behalf of the city. The proposed demolition was part of a bigger project known as Rosebank Linear Park Development.
