= Rosebank (Gautrain station) =

Railway station in Johannesburg, South Africa

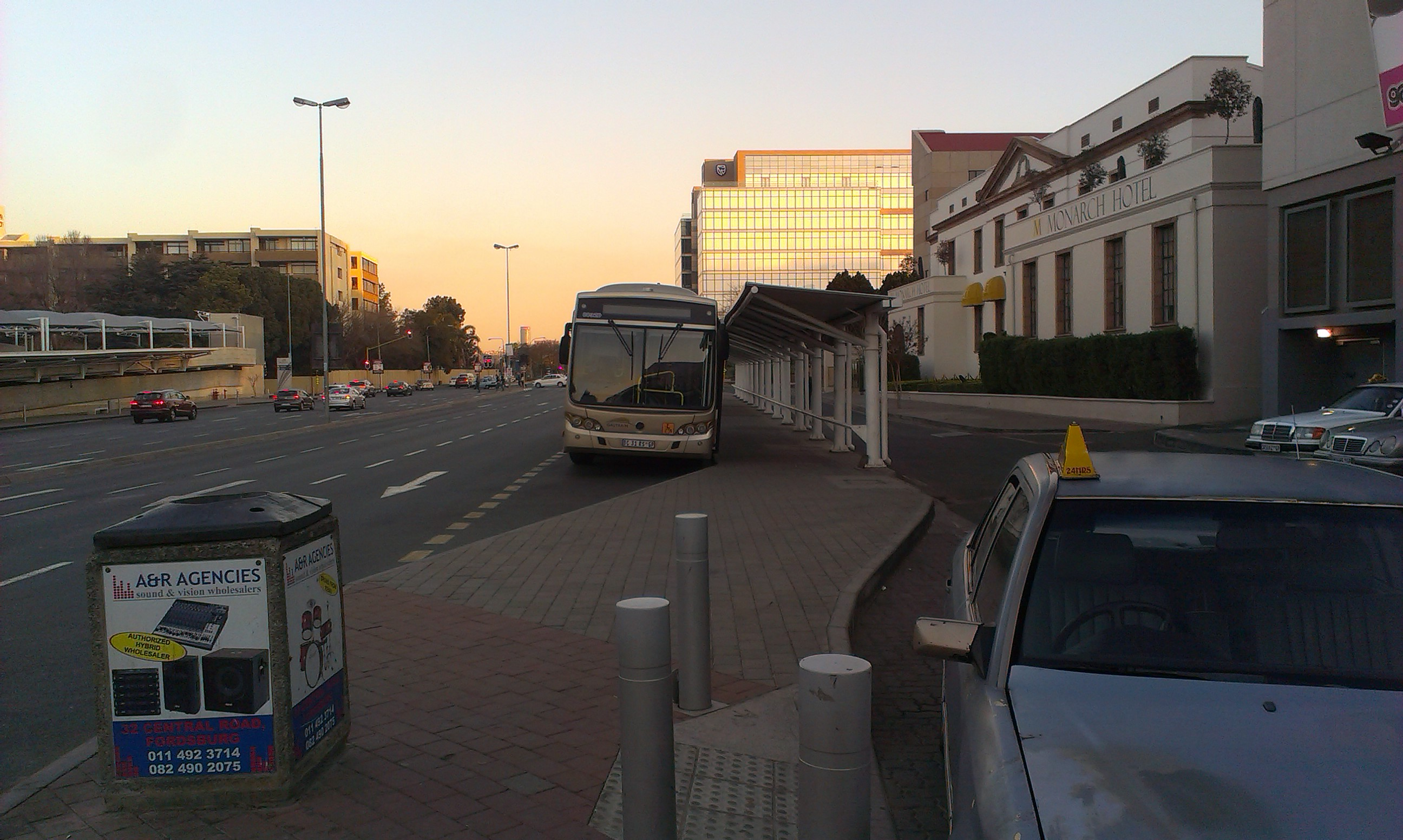
- Rosebank station at the Gautrain bus stops

General information
- Coordinates: 26.146644°S 28.044693°E
- System: Gautrain rapid transit station
- Line: North–South Line
- Platforms: 2 side platforms
- Tracks: 2

Construction
- Accessible: yes

History
- Opened: 2 August 2011

Services
Preceding station	Gautrain	Following station
Park Station Terminus	North–South Line	Sandton towards Hatfield
Location

Rosebank is a metro station on the Gautrain rapid transit system in Rosebank, Johannesburg, Gauteng. It opened for passenger services on 2 August 2011 as part of the second phase of the Gautrain project.

== Location ==
Rosebank station is located in the eponymous suburb, in the northwestern section of the City of Johannesburg, near the intersection of Oxford Road and Jellicoe Avenue. Unlike its northern neighbor, Sandton, Rosebank is a smaller, albeit equally affluent, business district in the city, characterized by low-density expensive real estate with elements of mixed-use, but lacking in basic infrastructure.

=== Transit-oriented development ===
As with other Gautrain stations, Rosebank is being used as a tool to promote transit-oriented development within the area. To do this, planners created a road-related masterplan to create a road hierarchy within the study area, in doing so creating a pedestrian grid while reducing traffic within the core. Zoning regulations were changed so as to create a dense core, with building heights restricted further as the distance from the station increases. The intersection of the Oxford Road corridor, specifically near Jellicoe Avenue, has a maximum allowance of twenty stories, while the southern section of the corridor is restricted to fifteen. The western section of the study area has a ten-story height restriction, while outlying areas are capped at three.

== Station layout ==
One of three underground stations in the Gautrain system, Rosebank station has two side platforms with two tracks.

== Services ==
Rosebank is served by trains on the North–South line, running northbound to Pretoria and Hatfield and southbound to Park Station in the Johannesburg central business district.
