= Rosebank, Gauteng =

Rosebank
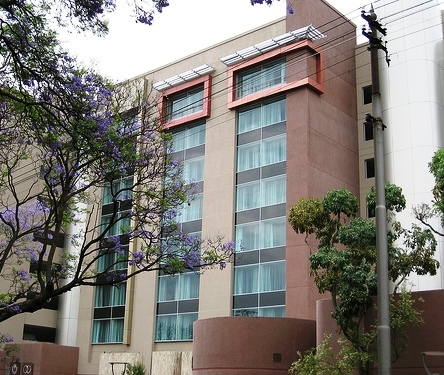
- A hotel in Rosebank, Johannesburg

- Location within Gauteng Location within South Africa
- Coordinates: 26°8′43″S 28°2′26″E
- Country: South Africa
- Province: Gauteng
- Municipality: City of Johannesburg
- Main Place: Johannesburg

Area
  - Total: 1.42 km^{2} (0.55 sq mi)

Population (2011)
  - Total: 1,085
  - Density: 764/km^{2} (1,980/sq mi)

Racial makeup (2023)
  - Black African: 35%
  - Coloured: 4%
  - Indian/Asian: 12%
  - White: 45%
  - Other: 4%

First languages (2023)
  - English: 63%
  - Zulu: 9%
  - Afrikaans: 5%
  - Tswana: 3%
  - Sesotho: 4%
  - isiXhosa: 6%
  - Other: 3-4%
- Time zone: UTC+2 (SAST)
- Postal code (street): 2196
- Area code: 011

Rosebank is an affluent suburb in the City of Johannesburg Metropolitan Municipality, 6.8 km to the north of Johannesburg CBD. It is located in Region B and is the location of a Gautrain station.

It began as a farm, before it was developed into a village and then a mixed residential and commercial suburb. During the apartheid era, it was classed as a "whites only" area only under the terms of the Group Areas Act.

During the final years of apartheid and in its aftermath, creative hubs and commercial businesses relocated from the Johannesburg CBD to Rosebank and other northern suburbs. Rosebank Mall was established in 1976. The Everard Read Art Gallery also relocated to the suburb, along with the national headquarters of several major South African banks and companies, as well as the local headquarters of Anglo American. In recent years, the Keyes Art Mile, an arts precinct, has been established in Rosebank.

== Geography ==
Oxford Road runs north–south through the suburb and connects it to Johannesburg's broader metropolitan area. Oxford Road and Jan Smuts Avenue (M27) are the primary road corridors, allowing access to neighbouring suburbs and the Johannesburg CBD.

Rosebank is generally bounded by Parkwood to the west, Melrose and Melrose Estate to the east, Parktown North to the north, and Saxonwold and Killarney to the south.

== History ==
The suburb was originally a farm, Rosemill Orchards. In 1986, plots on the farm were sold by auctioneer Richard Currie and it later developed into a village. In 1919, the City Council renamed the streets to honour World War I British Admirals.

Development had begun to accelerate by 1945, and it became one of the first areas in Johannesburg to introduce a trolley-bus transport system.

The area was historically classed as a "whites only" area only during the apartheid era under the terms of the Group Areas Act, a series of South African laws that restricted urban areas according to racial classifications.

A number of buildings in Rosebank have heritage protections, such as the Rosebank Fire Station, built in 1939, in the Art Deco style.

In 1990, Stephen Le Roith, son of Harold Le Roith designed 21 Cradock Avenue, a celebrated building in the Modernist style.

== Economy ==
Rosebank is home to a number of corporate offices including Nu Metro Cinemas, Sasol, TotalEnergies (TOTAL House) Bank of Taiwan, Car Track, Internet Solutions, State Bank of India, Standard Bank, Sappi, PepsiCo, BP, Coca-Cola SA, Anglo American plc, Universal Music Group and Sony Music Entertainment.

Rosebank has been a beneficiary of northwards drift of capital and corporations from Johannesburg CBD during the final years of the apartheid era, followed by an acceleration in the post-apartheid era. Rosebank Mall was established in 1976 and has remained a focal point of the suburb.

== Transport ==
Rosebank has a dedicated Gautrain metro station, Rosebank. It opened for passenger services on 2 August 2011 as part of the second phase of the Gautrain project. It links Rosebank to Sandton, Pretoria, and O. R. Tambo International Airport.

== Education ==
Rosebank is home to St Teresa's School, a private girls' primary and high school, which was first established in 1930 by Sisters of Mercy and it was known as Rosebank Convent and later St Teresa's Convent.

Rosebank also shares a border to the east with Kingsmead College, a private girls' primary and high school, in Melrose.

== Places of interest ==
=== Arts precinct ===
In 2016, Keyes Art Mile, was conceived as a new arts precinct in Rosebank. was ultimately established as a recognised precinct in 2024 and situated in lower Rosebank with the Trumpet building beside Circa Gallery. The precinct has expanded to include St Teresa's School and Everard Read Art Gallery on Jellico Avenue. The gallery was established in 1913 and is Africa's oldest commercial art gallery. After over 50 years in the Johannesburg CBD, it relocated in the late 1970s to its present location, a purpose-built gallery in Rosebank. Keyes Art Mile 2.0 was launched in April 2026, the second phase of the arts precinct.

=== Churches ===
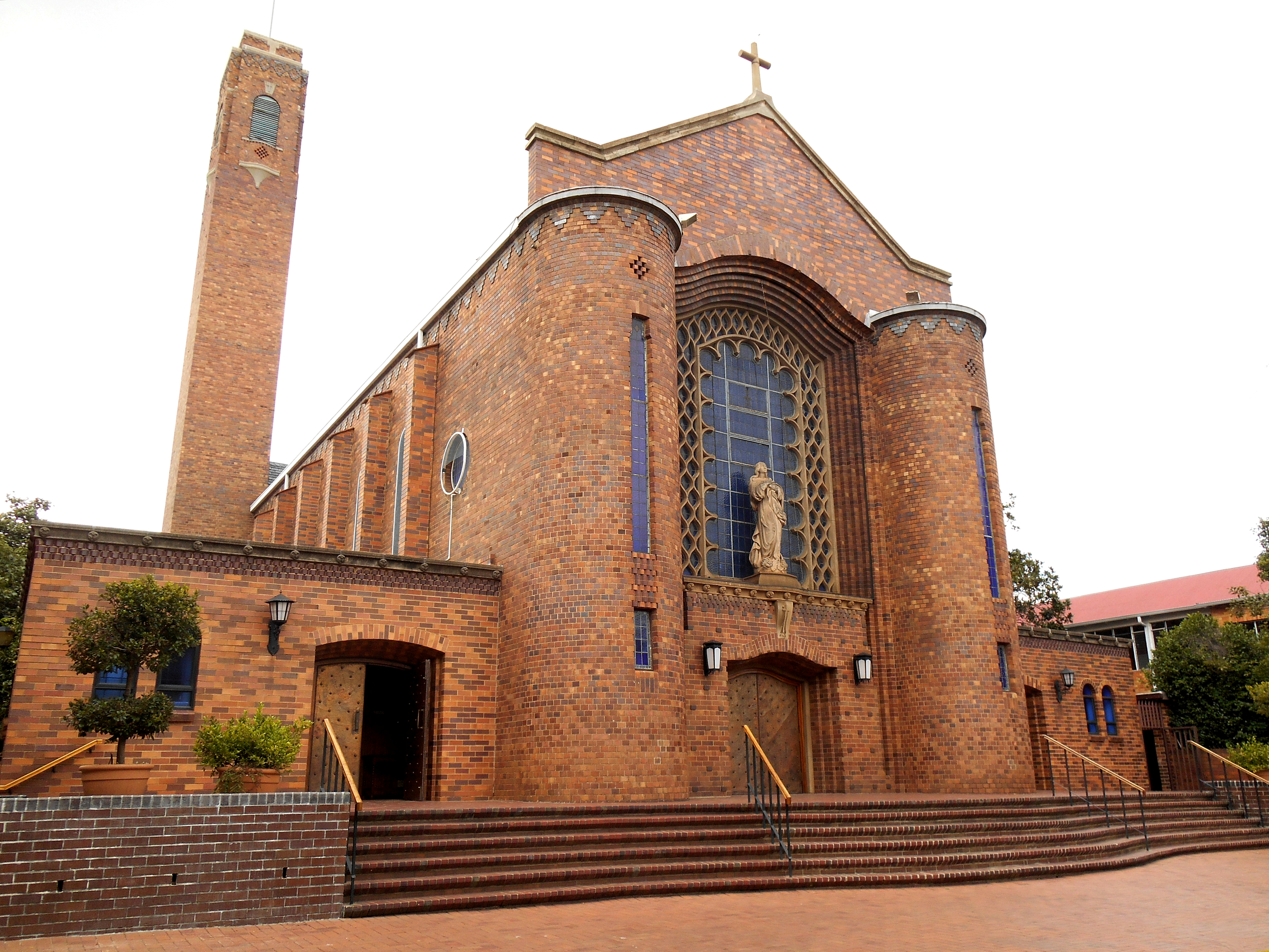
Rosebank Catholic Church

Rosebank Catholic Church, a Catholic Church on Keyes Avenue was built in 1935 and designed by the Irish-South African architect, Brendan Joseph Clinch.

St Martin's in-the-Veld Anglican Church is an Anglican Church on Cradock Avenue. The congregation's first building was completed on this location in 1912.
