= Sandton (Gautrain station) =

Train station near Johannesburg, South Africa

Coordinates: 26.1078°S 28.0572°E

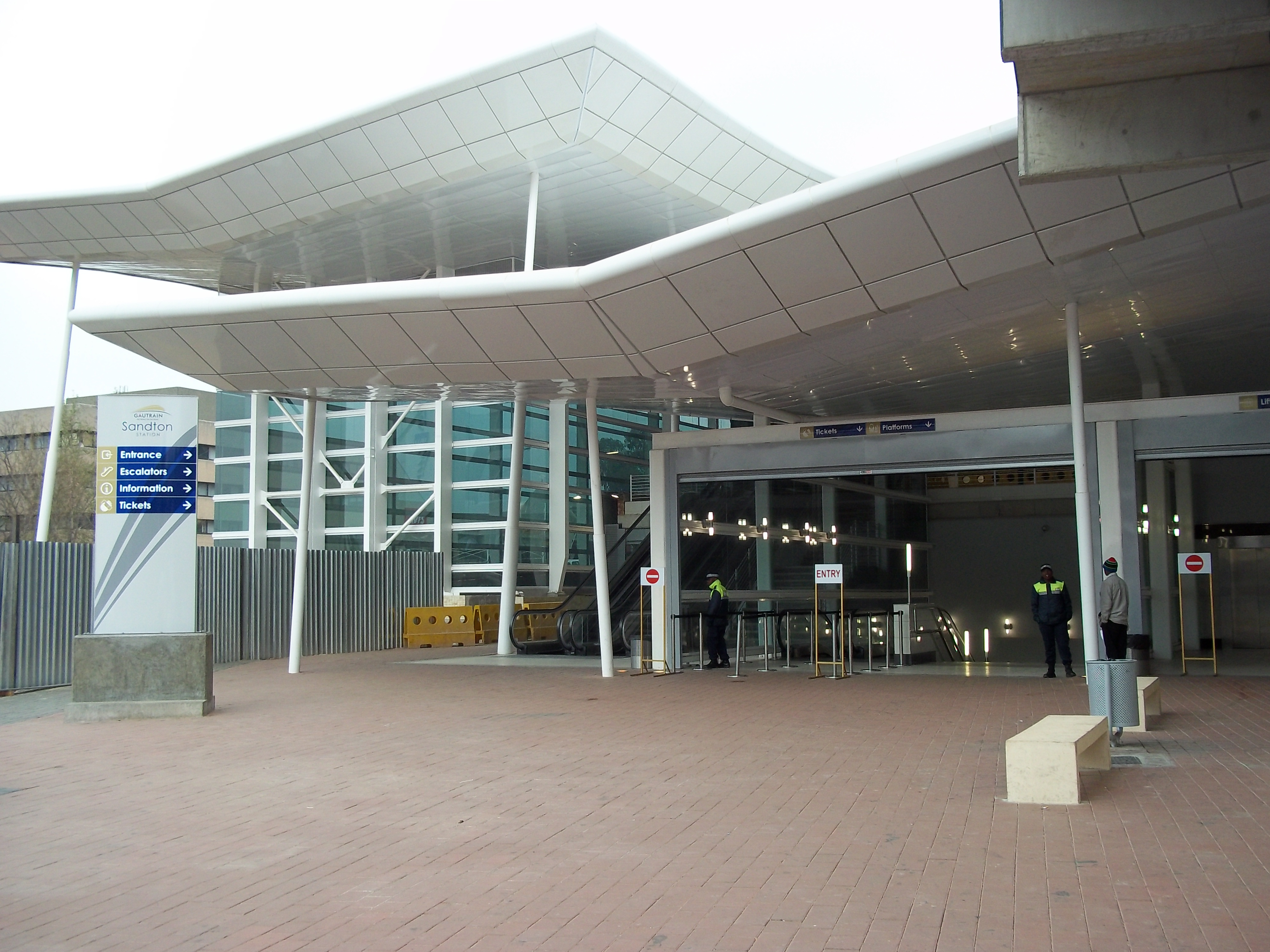
- Outside view of Sandton Station

General information
- System: Gautrain rapid transit station
- Line: East–West Line North–South Line
- Platforms: 1 island platform (upper level); 1 side platform (lower level)
- Tracks: 3

Construction
- Depth: 45 m (148 ft)
- Accessible: yes

History
- Opened: 8 June 2010

Services
Preceding station	Gautrain	Following station
Terminus	East–West Line	Marlboro towards OR Tambo
Rosebank towards Park Station	North–South Line	Marlboro towards Hatfield
Location

Sandton is a metro station on the Gautrain rapid transit system in Sandton, Gauteng. It opened to traffic on 8 June 2010 with service to OR Tambo International Airport.

== Location ==
Sandton station is located in the neighbourhood of the same name in northern Johannesburg, specifically near the Sandton City/Nelson Mandela Square developments at the intersection of Rivonia and West Streets.

=== Transit-oriented development ===
Developers and the Gauteng government aimed to make Sandton station the centre of one of the first transit-oriented development projects in South Africa. Because of the area's financial importance, with the Johannesburg Stock Exchange being a major focal point, and location near a number of important roads, such development also required an upgrade of the arterial road network in the surrounding area.

The area surrounding Sandton station was divided into six management areas, which cover land use, development density, and pedestrian accessibility. Management Area 1, bounded by Sandton Street, Katherine Street, Rivonia Road, and Fredman Drive, encircles Nelson Mandela Square and the immediate vicinity of the station and is planned to contain buildings of up to 40 storeys with a development density of 110 units per hectare, thus categorising it as high-density and mixed-use. In addition, a series of pedestrian corridors traverse the district, creating a grid to enable more pedestrian-friendly development and to encourage walking and sustainability. Subsequent and more distant management areas have lower height restrictions of ten to fifteen storeys while maintaining the 110 units per hectare density requirement, which centralises development towards a defined central business district.

== Station layout ==
Architecturally, Sandton is unique amongst Gautrain stations. Although it is not the only underground station, it is the only one with a two-level platform arrangement. The upper level serves trains on the north–south axis of the system, with trains heading southbound to Park Station in central Johannesburg and northbound to Pretoria, while the lower level has only one platform and acts as the terminus for OR Tambo International Airport-bound trains.

== Services ==
Sandton station is the operational hub of the Gautrain system. Along with Marlboro, it is one of only two stations in the entire network to be served by all trains on the Airport and north–south lines. In addition, Sandton also has six additional feeder bus routes bringing passengers from more distant areas to the station. Numbered S1 to S6, the buses travel to/from Wendywood (S2), Rivonia (S3), Randburg (S4), Fourways (S5), and Rosebank (S6), as well as a Sandton CBD loop (S1).
