= Metrorail Gauteng =

South African commuter rail network

Metrorail Gauteng Region

Overview
- Owner: PRASA
- Transit type: Commuter rail
- Annual ridership: 19 million (2023)
- Headquarters: 30 Wolmarans St, Braamfontein, Johannesburg, 2017
- Website: www.metrorail.co.za

Operation
- Operator: Metrorail

Technical
- Track gauge: 1,067 mm (3 ft 6 in)
- Electrification: Overhead lines

Metrorail Gauteng is a network of commuter rail services in Gauteng province in South Africa, serving the Johannesburg and Pretoria metro areas. It is operated by Metrorail, a division of the Passenger Rail Agency of South Africa (PRASA).

Metrorail routes spread out across the province from three main hubs: Park Station in Johannesburg, Germiston Station on the East Rand, and Pretoria Station. Routes serve central Johannesburg, the East Rand, Soweto, the Vaal Triangle, the West Rand, central Pretoria, and suburbs to the north, east and west of Pretoria.

Significant areas not served by Metrorail are the northern and western suburbs of Johannesburg, including Sandton and Randburg, and the south-eastern suburbs of Pretoria. Some of the northern suburbs of Johannesburg are now served by the new Gautrain rapid-rail system.

== Routes ==
Metrorail Gauteng consists of the following routes:

- Johannesburg–Springs: serves Johannesburg, Germiston, Boksburg, Benoni, Brakpan and Springs
- Springs–Nigel: serves Springs and Nigel
- Germiston–Kwesine: serves Germiston and Katlehong
- Germiston–Kliprivier–Vereeniging: serves Germiston, Katlehong, Meyerton and Vereeniging
- Germiston–New Canada: serves Germiston and the Reef south of central Johannesburg
- Johannesburg–New Canada–Vereeniging: serves Johannesburg, Orlando, Lenasia, Sebokeng and Vereeniging
- Johannesburg–Oberholzer: serves Johannesburg, Orlando, Westonaria and Carletonville
- George Goch–Johannesburg–Naledi: serves Johannesburg and Soweto
- Johannesburg–Randfontein: serves Johannesburg, Roodepoort, Krugersdorp and Randfontein
- Johannesburg–Leralla/Pretoria: serves Johannesburg, Germiston, Kempton Park, Tembisa, Centurion and Pretoria
- Pretoria–Saulsville: serves Pretoria, Pretoria West and Atteridgeville
- Pretoria/Belle Ombre–De Wildt/Mabopane: serves Pretoria, Pretoria North, Ga-Rankuwa and Soshanguve
- Pretoria–Pienaarspoort: serves Pretoria, Hatfield and Mamelodi
- Hercules–Capital Park–Pienaarspoort: serves Pretoria North and Mamelodi

== Maps ==
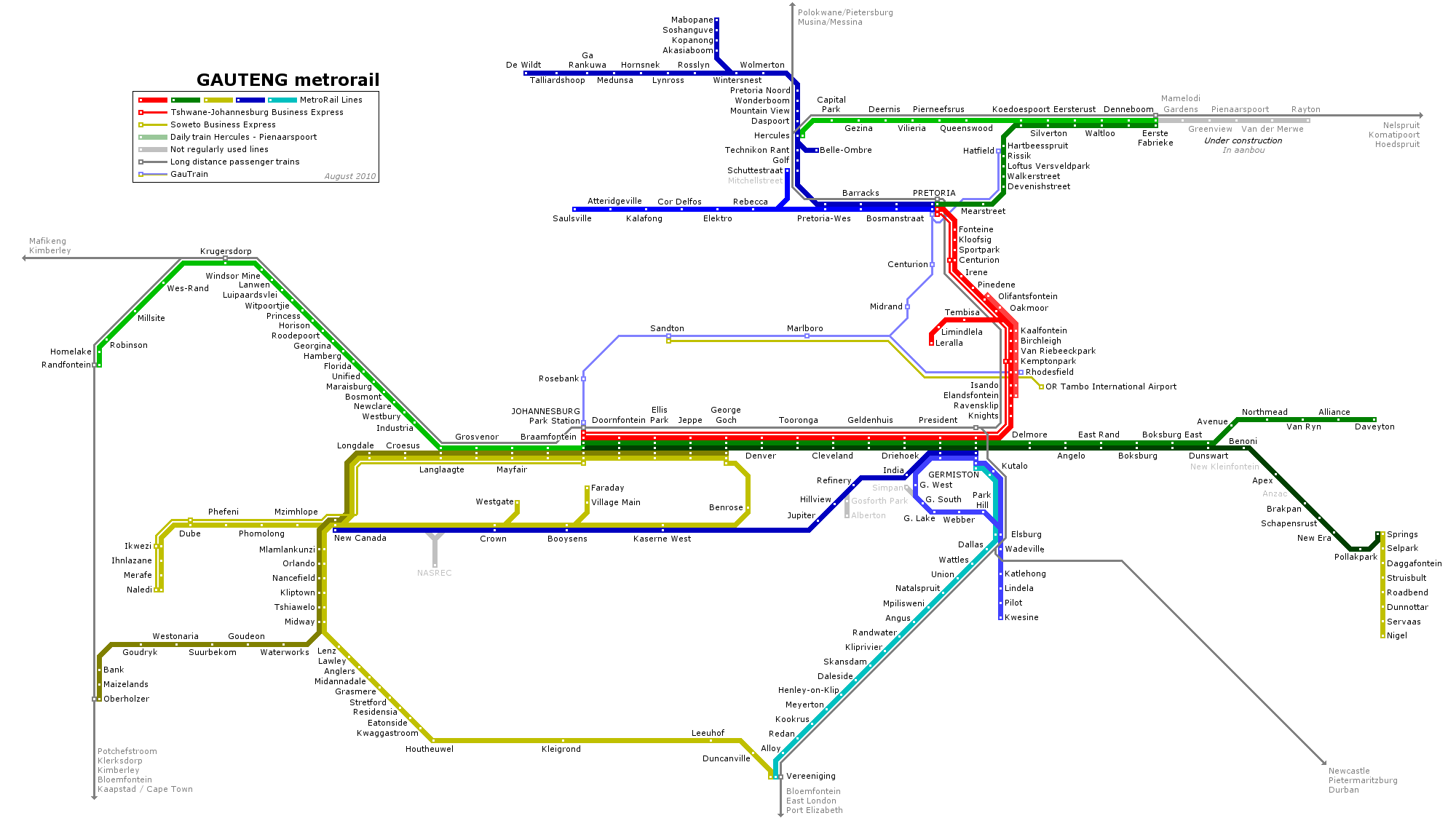

== See also ==
- Gautrain
