= Hatfield, Pretoria =

Hatfield
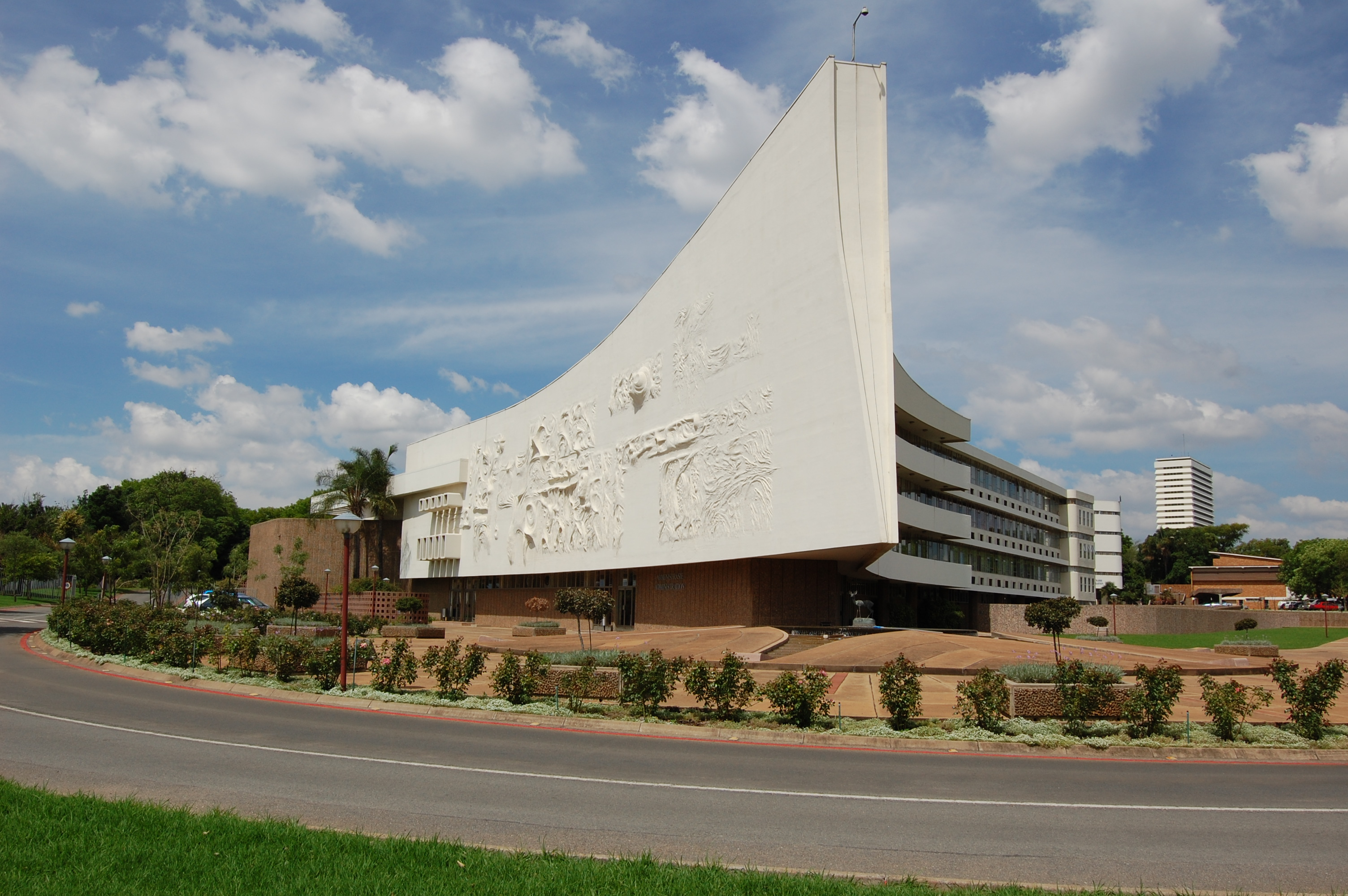
- University of Pretoria's Administration building ("Die skip") on its Hatfield campus

- Location within Gauteng Location within South Africa Location within Africa
- Coordinates: 25.748°S 28.238°E
- Country: South Africa
- Province: Gauteng
- Municipality: City of Tshwane
- Main Place: Pretoria

Area
  - Total: 1.97 km^{2} (0.76 sq mi)

Population (2011)
  - Total: 9,274
  - Density: 4,710/km^{2} (12,200/sq mi)

Racial makeup (2011)
  - Black African: 50.8%
  - Coloured: 2.5%
  - Indian/Asian: 5.3%
  - White: 43.9%
  - Other: 1.4%

First languages (2011)
  - English: 33.1%
  - Afrikaans: 28.9%
  - Tswana: 7.0%
  - Zulu: 6.0%
  - Other: 25.0%
- Time zone: UTC+2 (SAST)
- Postal code (street): 0002
- PO box: 0028
- Area code: 012

Hatfield is a suburb in Pretoria, South Africa with a high density of students as well as student accommodation due to its close proximity to the University of Pretoria's main campus.

== History ==
The suburb was proclaimed on a portion of land previously belonging to Koedoespoort, which was owned by Lourens Cornelius Bronkhorst in the nineteenth century. An heir to Bronkhorst's estate sold the farm in 1885 to the Wesleyan Methodist Society. The land was sold again in 1903, after the Second Boer War. It was purchased by the Colonial Secretary of the Transvaal, Patrick Duncan. The suburb is named after Hatfield House, an estate in Hertfordshire, England that belonged to William Palmer, 2nd Earl of Selborne, who became Governor of the Transvaal in 1905.

The first business in Hatfield was the Hatfield Bakery, which was opened by Sakkie Andrews in 1932. This was later followed by the Rissik Station Stores and the multi-storey Hatfield Galleries on Burnett Street. Since the late 1980s, the character of Hatfield has changed rapidly as more and more businesses have been established in the area and today it is a mixed-use neighborhood with only 18% of the surface area still residential in nature.

== Transport ==
The suburb is served by the Gautrain. The Hatfield Gautrain station is located within the Hatfield Business Node east of the Pretoria CBD.

== Education ==
The suburb is served by a number of educational institutions;

- University of Pretoria, the Hatfield campus is the main university campus, houses six of the nine faculties. The campus, was built over 24 hectares (59 acres) and has more than 60 buildings of historical value.
- Hatfield Montessori Pre-School, a pre-school, located on South Street

== Amenities ==
=== Parks ===
There are three parks situated in the suburbs;Richard Street Park, Belgrave Square and Springbokpark.

=== Sports ===
The area is also home to the Pretoria East Bowling club on Burnett Street. It is the oldest sports club in Hatfield and was established in 1923. There is also a tennis club, Belgrave Tennis Club, also located on Burnett Street.

The area is also home to Tuks Cricket Oval, which has 6 cricket fields, 3 Football fields, one rugby, and two hockey fields.
