= Pretoria railway station =

Railway station in Pretoria, South Africa

Pretoria
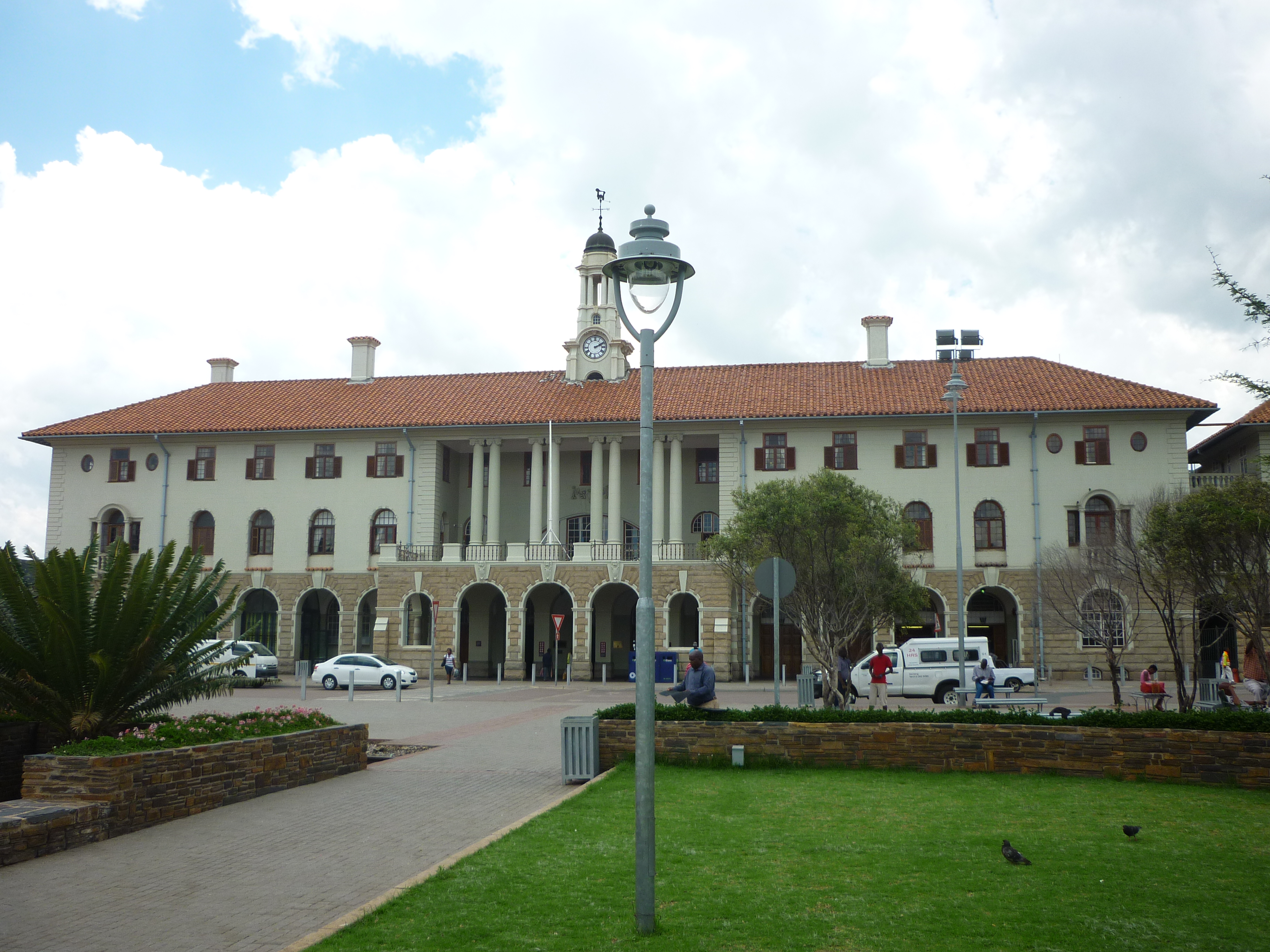

General information
- Location: Scheiding Street, Pretoria
- Coordinates: 25°45′29″S 28°11′21″E
- System: Railway station
- Owner: PRASA
- Line: Shosholoza Meyl: Johannesburg–Komatipoort Johannesburg–Musina Gautrain: North–South Line Metrorail: Johannesburg–Pretoria Pretoria–Mabopane/De Wildt Pretoria–Pienaarspoort Pretoria–Saulsville

Construction
- Structure type: At-grade

History
- Opened: 1892
- Rebuilt: 1910
Location
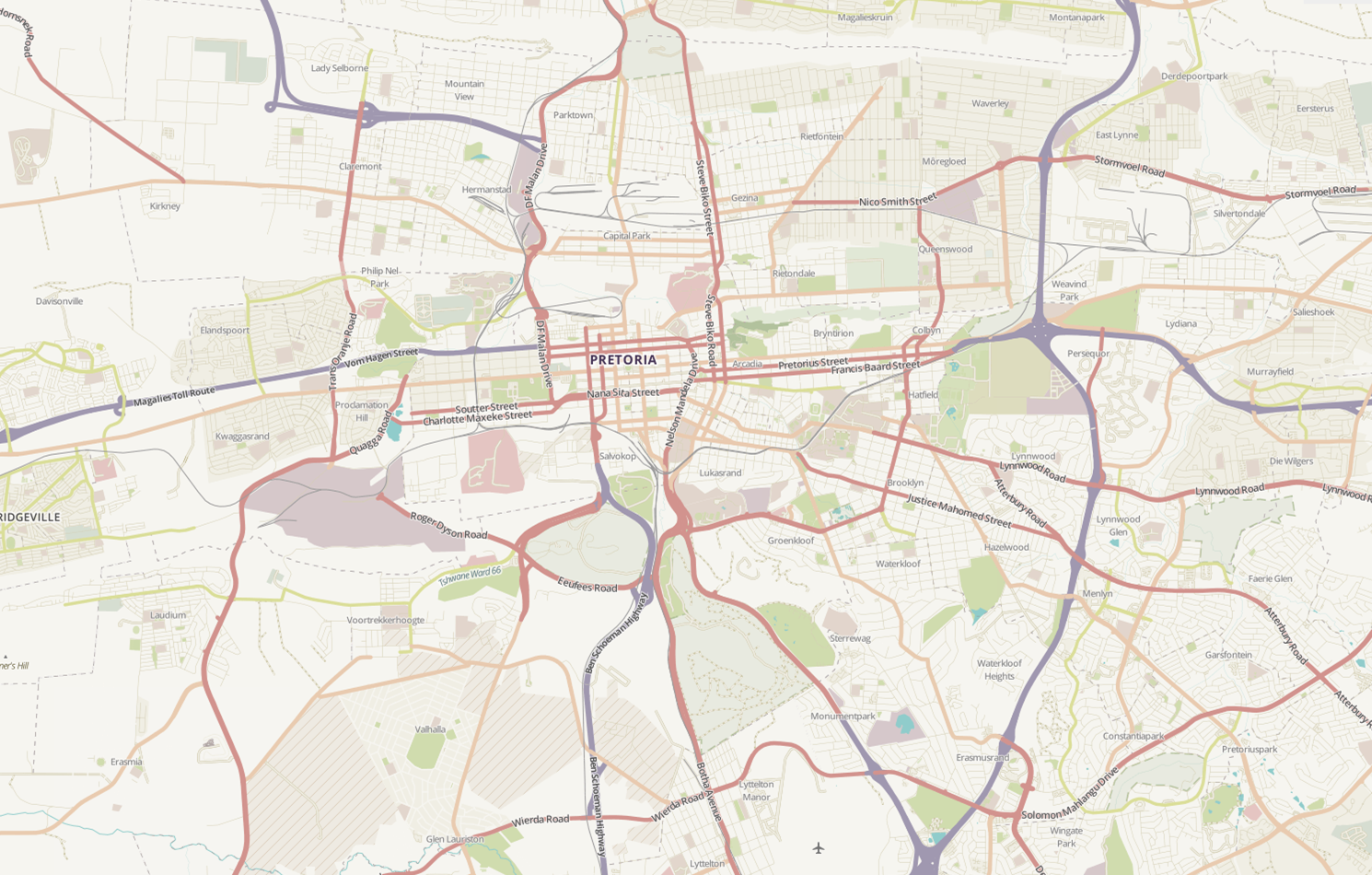
- Location within Pretoria Location within Gauteng Location within South Africa

Pretoria railway station is the central station in Pretoria, the executive capital of South Africa. It is located between Pretoria's central business district and Salvokop, in a 1910 building designed by Herbert Baker. It is the terminus of various Metrorail commuter rail services in the northern part of Gauteng, and a stop on Shosholoza Meyl inter-city services from Johannesburg to Polokwane and Nelspruit. Pretoria is also the northern terminus of the luxury Blue Train service from Cape Town. Platforms and tracks for the Gautrain rapid-rail service are adjacent to the main-line station.

== History ==
The first railway station in Pretoria was built in 1892 by the Netherlands-South African Railway Company (NZASM) as the western terminus of its line to the harbour of Delagoa Bay (now Maputo). In 1910, shortly before the creation of the Union of South Africa, the government of the Transvaal Colony decided to spend excess funds on constructing a new station for Pretoria, rather than surrendering the money to the new national government. The new station was the first public building designed by Sir Herbert Baker.

On 19 February 2001, a signalling failure led to major delays to Metrorail services in Pretoria. Angered by the delays, some commuters set a fire in a waiting room which spread to the roof of the building, which caved in. Almost all of the roof was destroyed, although the structure itself was saved. The restoration, which cost 18 million rand, started in June 2001 and finished in February 2002.

== Services ==
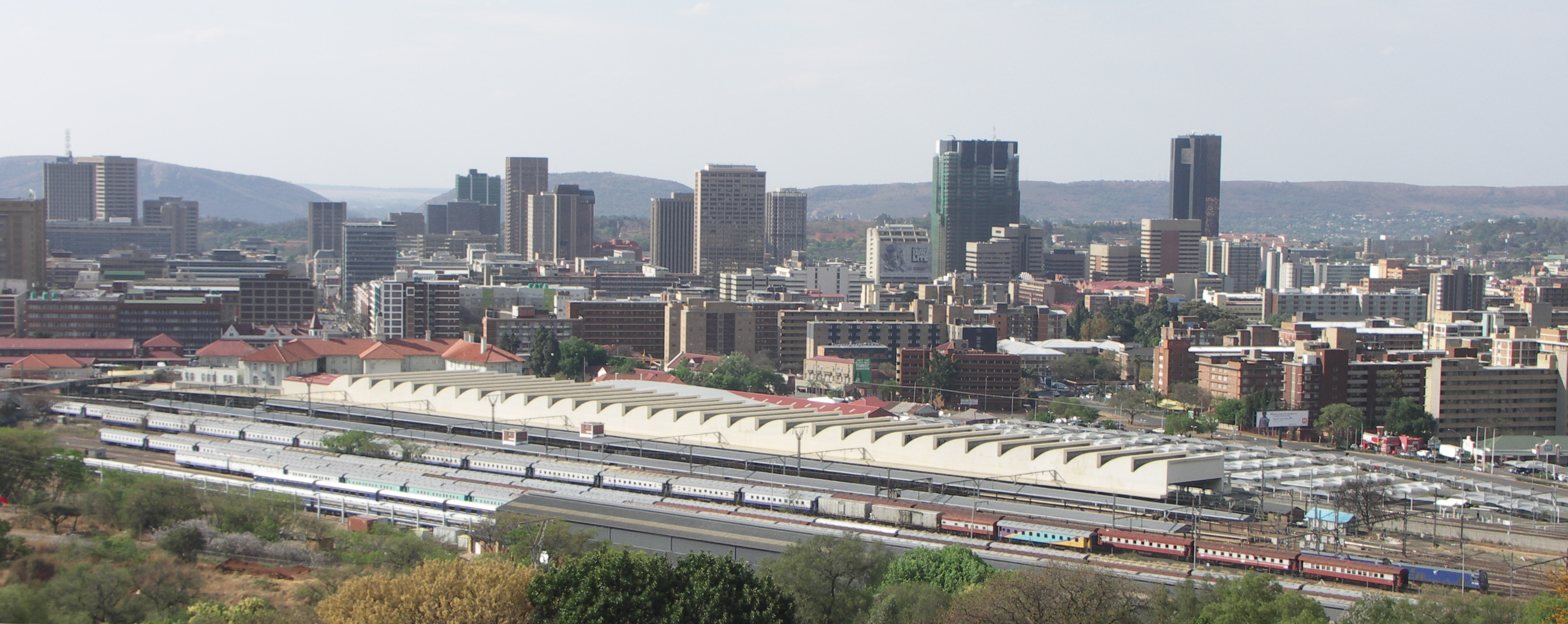
View of the station from Salvokop

Shosholoza Meyl inter-city services originating from Johannesburg pass through Pretoria en route to Musina via Polokwane and Komatipoort via Nelspruit. Metrorail commuter services operate from Pretoria west to Atteridgeville, north to Soshanguve and Ga-Rankuwa, east to Mamelodi, and south to Johannesburg Park Station.

The Gautrain connects Pretoria station to Park Station, also running eastward in Pretoria to the line's terminus at Hatfield.

Preceding station	Shosholoza Meyl	Following station
Germiston towards Johannesburg	Johannesburg–Komatipoort	Eerste Fabrieke towards Komatipoort
Germiston towards Johannesburg	Johannesburg–Musina	Pyramid towards Musina
Preceding station	Gautrain	Following station
Centurion towards Park Station	North–South Line	Hatfield Terminus
Preceding station	Metrorail Gauteng	Following station
Fonteine towards Johannesburg	Johannesburg–Pretoria	Terminus
Terminus	Pretoria–Saulsville	Bosman Street towards Saulsville
Terminus	Pretoria–Mabopane/De Wildt	Bosman Street towards Mabopane or De Wildt
Terminus	Pretoria–Pienaarspoort	Mears Street towards Pienaarspoort
