= Johannesburg Park station =

Central railway station in Johannesburg, South Africa

Johannesburg Park Station
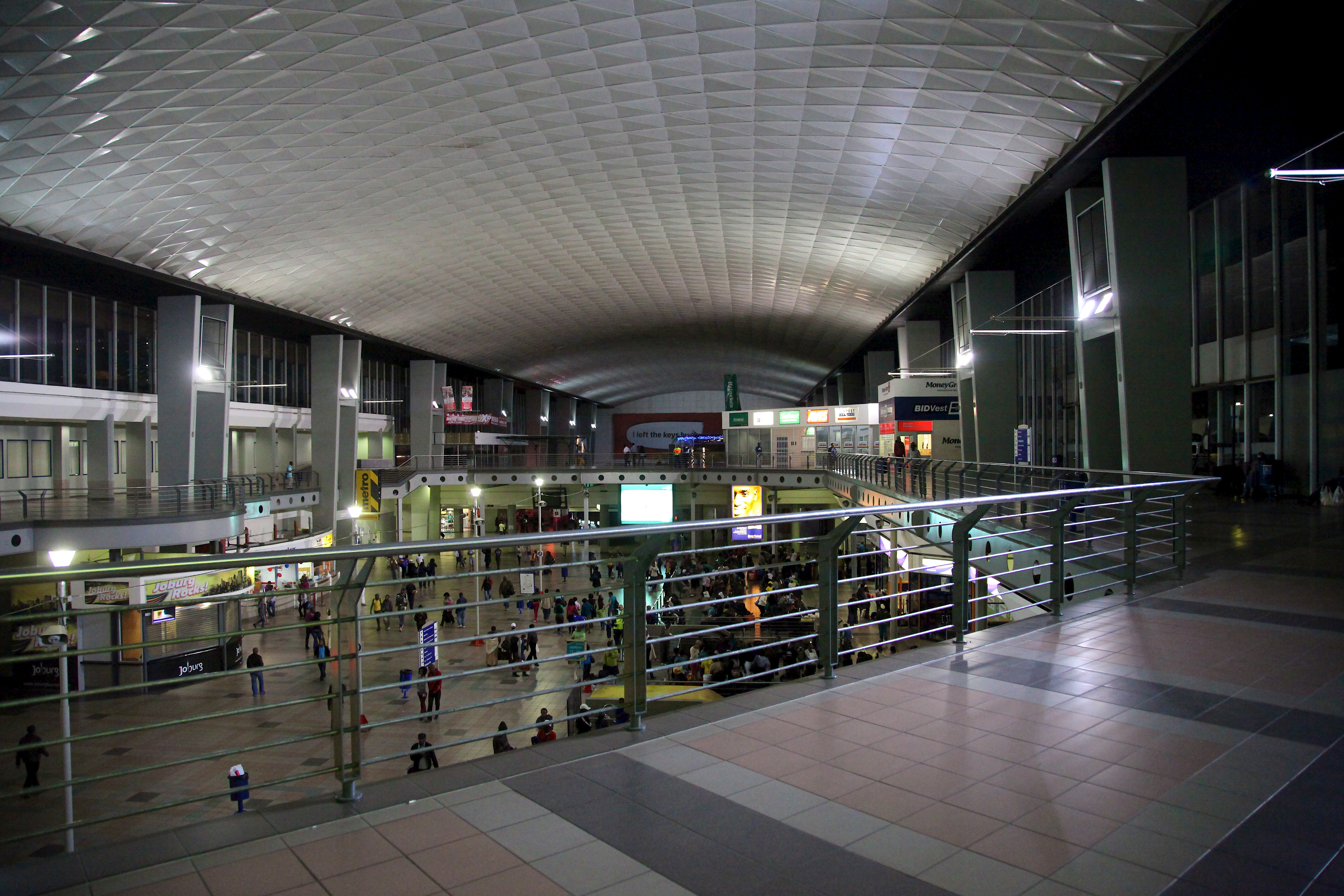

General information
- Location: Rissik Street, Johannesburg
- Coordinates: 26°11′50″S 28°2′31″E
- System: Railway station
- Owner: PRASA
- Line: Shosholoza Meyl: Johannesburg–Port Elizabeth Johannesburg–Durban Johannesburg–Cape Town Johannesburg–East London Johannesburg–Komatipoort Johannesburg–Musina Premier Classe: Johannesburg–Cape Town Johannesburg–Durban Gautrain: North–South Line Metrorail: Johannesburg–Naledi Johannesburg–Daveyton Johannesburg–Pretoria Johannesburg–Vereeniging Johannesburg–Oberholzer Johannesburg–Randfontein Johannesburg–Springs
- Connections: Rea Vaya BRT

Construction
- Architect: Gordon Leith

History
- Opened: 1897
- Rebuilt: 1946
Location

Johannesburg Park Station is the central railway station in the city of Johannesburg, South Africa, and the largest railway station in Africa. It is located between the Central Business District and Braamfontein, in the block bordered by Rissik, Wolmarans, Wanderers, and Noord Streets. Park Station lies on the main Witwatersrand railway line that runs East-West from Krugersdorp to Germiston. The first four stations to the east are Doornfontein, Ellis Park, Jeppe and George Goch Stations.

Park Station is the centre of the Witwatersrand Metrorail network, with daily commuter rail services running west to Carletonville, Randfontein and Soweto; east to Springs, Nigel and Daveyton; north to Pretoria and south to Vereeniging. Park Station is also the terminus of Shosholoza Meyl long-distance services to Cape Town, Durban, Port Elizabeth, East London, Bloemfontein via Kimberley, Komatipoort via Nelspruit and Musina via Polokwane.

The southern terminus of the Gautrain rapid-rail service is located underground, in a separate station adjacent to the existing main-line station.

== History ==
A year after the surveying of a settlement on the waste land at Randjeslaagte near the new Witwatersrand goldfields, later to be called Johannesburg, in 1887 the South African Republic (ZAR) government set aside a strip of land north of Noord Street for a railway line, effectively dividing the future city's CBD in two though at this time only land south of Noord Street had been survey as building plots.

By 1888, an early railway line from Boksburg to Braamfontein would pass a tin shed at a station spot that would be called Park, named after the Krugers Park just north of the stop. Krugers Park would later be known as Old Wanderers. By 1889/1890 the stop was now called Park Halt on the Boksburg/Braamfontein line. The line was run by the De Nederlandsche Zuid-Afrikaansche Spoorweg Maatschappy (NZASM) and was known as the Rand Steam Tram which transported coal from the collieries at Boksburg to the yards at Braamfontein. It would later be extended westwards to Krugersdorp and eastwards from Boksburg to Springs.

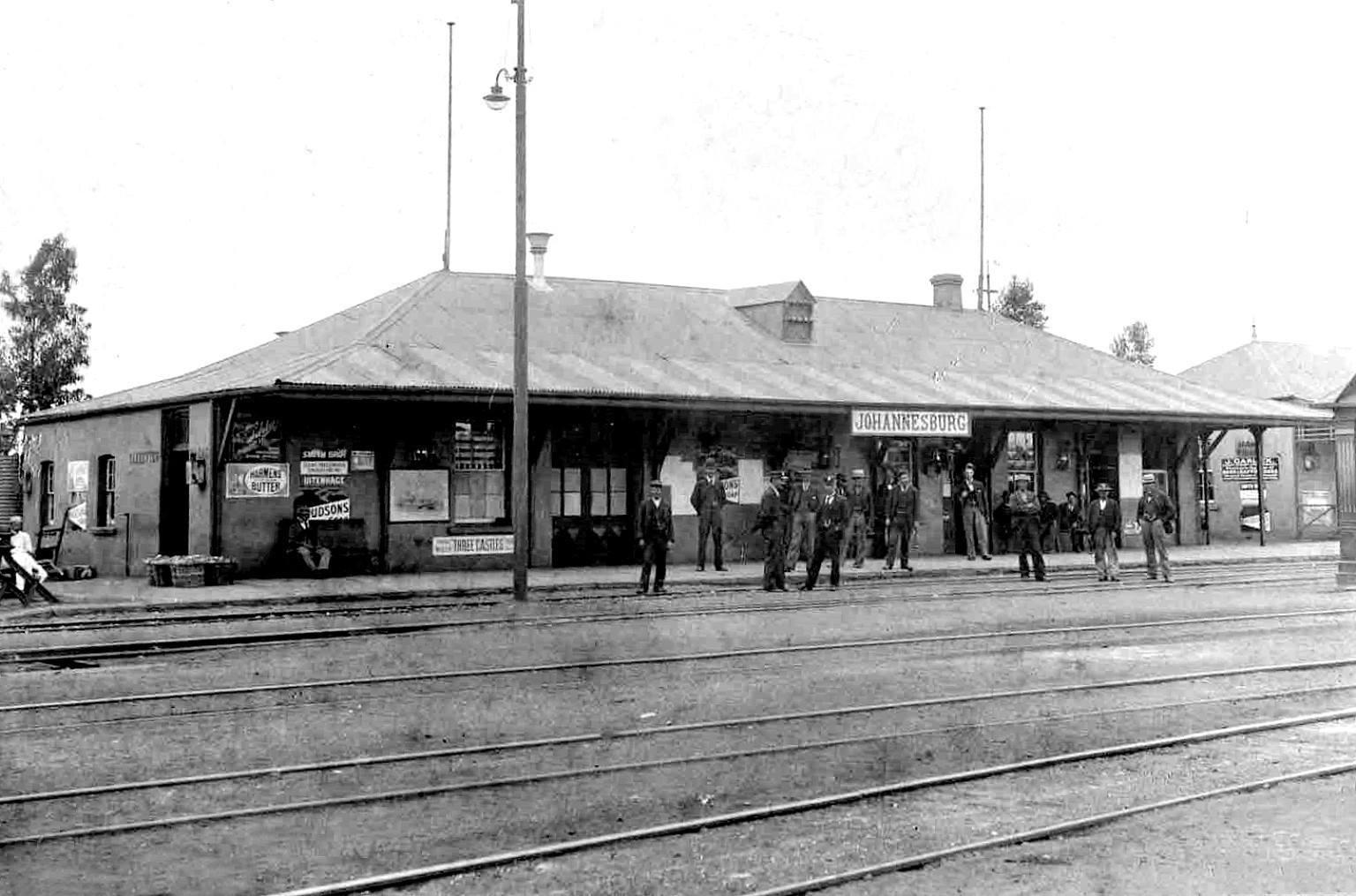
Park Halt c.1893

The NZASM was a railway monopoly granted by the South African Republic (ZAR) government for construction and management of railways in the Transvaal and was formed on 21 June 1887. The backers were Labouchere Oyens in the Netherlands and Robert Warschauer and Berliner Handels-Gesellschaft of Berlin, Germany. The NZASM planned to build a railway from Pretoria to the border of Portuguese East Africa (now Mozambique), the aim being to have an independent link to the Indian Ocean, bypassing British territory in the Cape and Natal. The project fell short of funding, and after money was loaned to the ZAR by the Cape government, they were able to obtain a further loan from Rothchilds, but with the condition the Cape rail authorities were allowed to continue the Cape line through the Orange Free State to Johannesburg and set the rate for a period of three years.

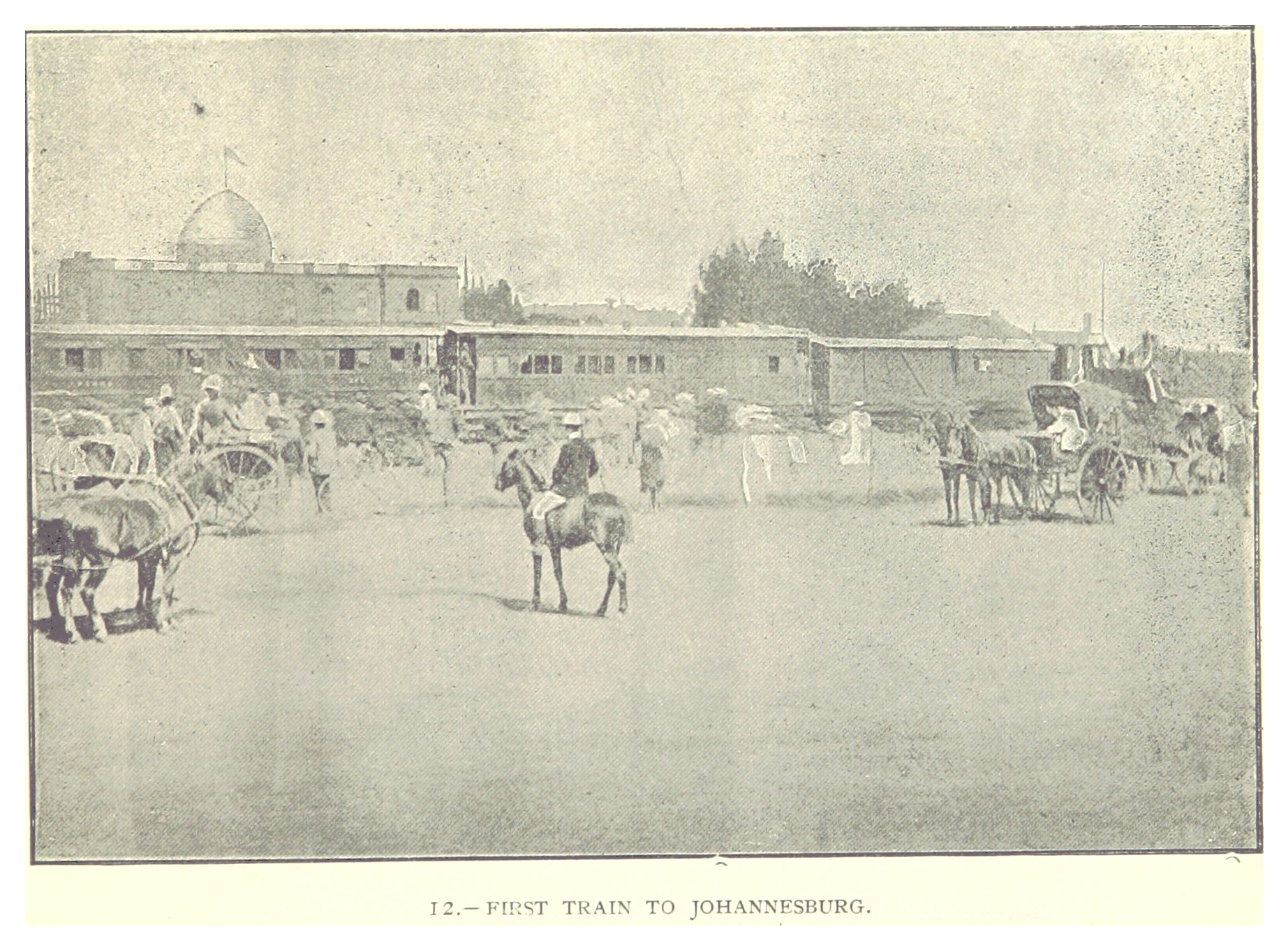
First train from Cape Town

The second train line to reach Johannesburg was therefore from Cape Town with the first train arriving on 15 September 1892. In 1893, Pretoria was finally connected to Johannesburg via a railway with the lines lowered from ground level closer to the station for public safety while to improve the connection to northern part of the town. A road bridge was constructed over the lines at King Georges Street and a pedestrian bridge built at the north end of Twist Street. This was soon followed by the ZAR's project to connect Pretoria to Delagoa Bay, with the first train arriving in Johannesburg from Lourenco Marques (Maputo) on 2 November 1894. The Colony of Natal would be connected to the goldfields on 2 January 1896 when the first train arrived in Johannesburg from Durban.

=== 1897 station ===
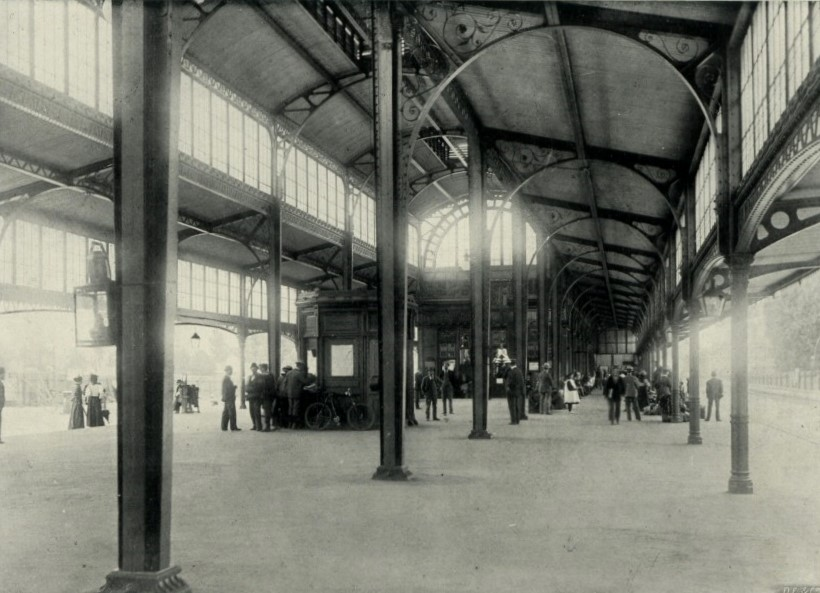
Interior of the 1897 Park Halt station

With the increase in passenger numbers, there was need for a new station. In May 1897 the ZAR upgraded Park Halt after they had purchased a steel and glass building from the Netherlands. The building had been part of the Amsterdam Exhibition, built in 1895 in Rotterdam and designed by architect Jacob Klinkhammer. Its erection begun in 1896 and was 154m long and 17m wide consisting of offices and passenger facilities with a restaurant. It was designed with cast iron pillars, ornate olive coloured iron work and a glass domed roof while the offices and restaurant walls were made of carved oak wood.

There was a restaurant with oak printed Dutch proverbs, some of which were transferred to the coffee shop in the new 1932 station. During 1906, in order to improve traffic in Johannesburg CBD, in Twist Street, a concrete bridge was built across the railway lines and a subway constructed at the railway lines for Harrison Street.

On the night of 5 July 1913, Park Station was damaged by fire during looting and rioting, after rioters cut open the fire-brigades hoses. The previous day, martial law had been declared after thousands of miners had gathered at Market Square and where the gathering had been broken up by the army and police. Rioting then ensued. The cause of the unrest was the firing of miners at Kleinfontein Gold Mine and a sympathy strike had spread to sixty-three other mines.

=== 1932 station ===
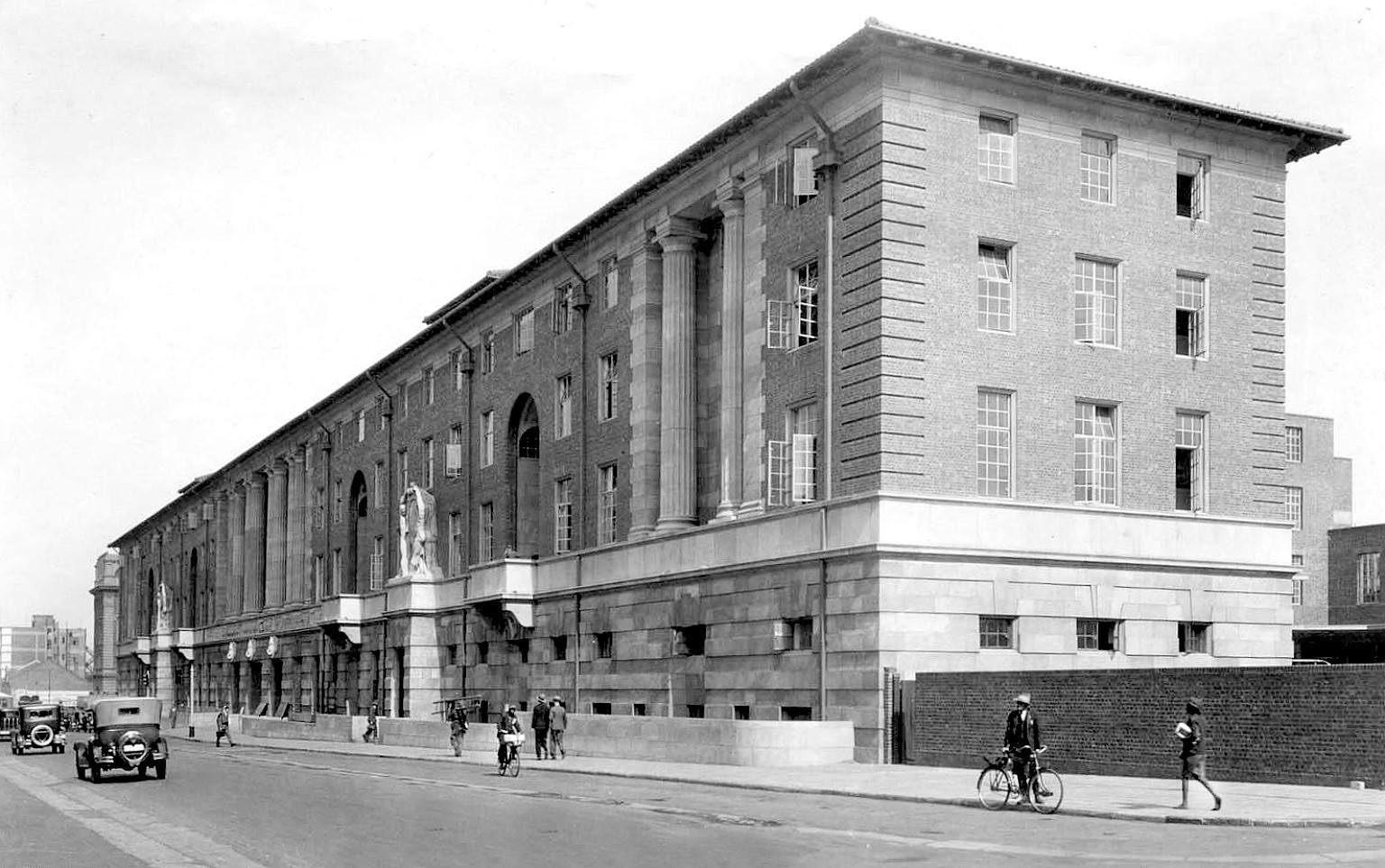
The new 1932 Park Station - De Villiers Street

By the late 1920s, the station passenger numbers had again outgrown its facilities. £650,000 was raised for a new concourse and eight platforms and four railway lines. The new facilities would need additional land which was only available to the north and was part of the Old Wanderers ground. There was opposition to the idea by the people of Johannesburg when a 100 ft strip of the Wanderers ground was proposed with the South African Railways offering £31,000 and the club wanting the amount doubled. The amount was settled on £35,000 and on 11 December 1928, a foundation stone was laid by the Minister of Railways, C.W. Malan. The architects were Gordon Leith and Partners who were associated with the architectural firm of Gerhard Moerdyk & Watson. The new station opened in 1932 with the concourse entrance on De Villiers Street facing Eloff Streets north end, the main shopping strip in the Johannesburg CBD. The frontage was decorated with Tuscan colonnades and the concourse had its interior walls decorated with twenty-eight painted panels by the artist Jacobus Hendrik Pierneef. In one restaurant there are blue and white hand painted tiles decorating the walls and pillars.

The station's design preserved racial segregation by allocating superior amenities to white users and inferior amenities to non-white users.

The old steel and glass train station structure would be dismantled in 1954 and moved to Esselen Park in Kempton Park where it was re-erected as a South African Railways training centre. In 1995, it was again dismantled and re-erected in Newtown just over 500 metres west of the current station with the aim eventually to house a museum.

=== 1965 station ===
By 1945, Park Station had reached a capacity of 130,000 passengers a day and there was a need to expand the station's infrastructure with a new station, administrative buildings and a newer bridge over the railway lines and so the ideal land for the project was the Wanderers ground. Transport Minister F. C. Sturrock would attempt to sell the project to the public while it was countered by the Wanderers Club and Johannesburg Publicity Association, representing about fifty other bodies.

The South African government would expropriate the Wanderers ground and after a legal appeal by those who disagreed, on 30 March 1946, the Appellate Division of the Supreme Court upheld the government's decision. The Government would pay the Wanderers Club £500,000 in compensation and the Johannesburg Council £1,000,000 in the form of land at Plein Square, New Kazerne and a small amount of land in Braamfontein and offset £300,000 owed by the council. Wanderers would move to their new grounds at Kent Park, Illovo, on 22 October 1946 where the club remains to this day.

The new station would be constructed in four stages between 1948 and 1965, designed by the architects Kennedy, Furner, Irvine-Smith & Joubert with civil engineering consultant firm A.S. Joffe. The first stage saw the new station moved northwards and the tracks dropped a further 4m and the station entrance was aligned with Joubert Street and completed in 1951. This stage also saw the construction of the Johan Rissik Bridge in 1952 slightly west of the station entrance, as well as other bridges over the tracks. By February 1954, the old station was lowered and new platforms and tracks constructed. The new part became the station for the main train lines, while the "older" station would house the suburban tracks. Later stages involved concrete covers over the platforms and the concourses built on top with the slabs over the suburban station completed in 1956 and main lines by 1961. When it officially opened in 1965, with ten suburban lines and six main lines.

== Crime ==
On 24 July 1964, Frederick John Harris of the African Resistance Movement planted a bomb on a whites-only platform of the Station. The bomb later exploded, killing a 77-year-old woman and injuring 23 others. Harris, a school teacher, was convicted of murder, and hanged on 1 April 1965.

It was revealed in 2018 that Park Station had become a hub for abduction of women and children who commute or work in the area, who then become victims of human trafficking.

== In popular culture ==
- In the episode "Sugar Water" of the 1st season of the South African Netflix series Queen Sono, Park Station is bombed by the fictional terrorist group Watu Wema.

== Gautrain station ==
Park Station is also the site of the southern terminus of the Gautrain, a high-speed rail link to Pretoria and the OR Tambo airport. The Gautrain station is adjacent to the existing main-line station, beneath Smit and Wolmarans streets, but with separate access. The station is modern and secure, with tight security and visible policing. Services run at 10-minute intervals during peak time, and access to services is via a pre-paid contactless Gautrain card. The station is underground, being connected via 9 miles of tunnel to Marlboro station. The line is fully electrified and built to the international standard 1,435 mm (4 ft 8 1/2 in) gauge, broader than the 'standard' 1,067 mm (3 ft 6 in) Cape gauge. The station opened for operation in June 2012.

== Services ==
| Preceding station | Shosholoza Meyl | Following station |
|---|---|---|
| Terminus | Johannesburg–Cape Town | Krugersdorp towards Cape Town |
| Terminus | Johannesburg–Durban | Germiston towards Durban |
| Terminus | Johannesburg–Port Elizabeth | Germiston towards Port Elizabeth |
| Terminus | Johannesburg–East London | Germiston towards East London |
| Terminus | Johannesburg–Komatipoort | Germiston towards Komatipoort |
| Terminus | Johannesburg–Musina | Germiston towards Musina |
| Preceding station | Premier Classe | Following station |
| Terminus | Johannesburg–Cape Town | Potchefstroom towards Cape Town |
| Terminus | Johannesburg–Durban | Germiston towards Durban |
| Preceding station | Gautrain | Following station |
| Terminus | North–South Line | Rosebank towards Hatfield |
| Preceding station | Metrorail Gauteng | Following station |
| Doornfontein towards George Goch | Johannesburg–Naledi via Park Station | Braamfontein towards Naledi |
| Doornfontein towards George Goch | Johannesburg–Vereeniging via Park Station | Braamfontein towards Vereeniging |
| Terminus | Johannesburg–Pretoria | Doornfontein towards Pretoria or Leralla |
| Terminus | Johannesburg–Oberholzer | Braamfontein towards Oberholzer |
| Terminus | Johannesburg–Randfontein | Braamfontein towards Randfontein |
| Terminus | Johannesburg–Springs | Doornfontein towards Springs |
| Terminus | Johannesburg–Daveyton | Doornfontein towards Daveyton |
