= Hatfield (Gautrain station) =

Metro station in Pretoria, South Africa

General information
- Location: cnr. Arcadia and Grosvenor Streets; Hatfield, Pretoria, Gauteng, 0083
- Coordinates: 25.7477°S 28.2384°E
- System: Gautrain rapid transit station
- Line: North–South Line
- Platforms: 2 side platforms
- Tracks: 2

Construction
- Accessible: yes

History
- Opened: 02 August 2011
- Electrified: 2011

Services
Preceding station	Gautrain	Following station
Pretoria towards Park Station	North–South Line	Terminus
Location

Hatfield is a metrorail station on the Gautrain rapid transit system in the suburb of Hatfield in Pretoria, Gauteng. It was opened on 2 August 2011 as part of the second phase of the Gautrain project.

== Location ==
The above- and underground station area is located east of the centre of Pretoria between Grosvenor Street and Jan Shoba Street (M7). The Hatfield station forms the northern terminus on the north–south route of the Gautrain and allows passengers to pass to the PRASA rail network.

Passengers travelling to OR Tambo International Airport change trains at Marlboro station for a direct 15-minute transit to the airport.

== Connections with other modes of transport ==
The station can be reached by various modes of transport. These include the Gautrain bus service for Gautrain passengers, a dedicated feeder system at the stations. Not far from the station is the station Hartbeesspruit of PRASA, whose tracks run parallel to the Gautrain. Short-term car parking spaces are available in the vicinity of the Gautrain station.

Gautrain passengers can reach the station's platforms via stairs and escalators/elevators.

== Urban functional areas and attractions near the station ==
- University of Pretoria, other educational institutions,
- University sports facilities and the Loftus Versfeld Stadium,
- Shopping and business centers Hatfield and Brooklyn Mall,
- Diplomatic missions for most countries.
