= Gautrain =

Rapid rail transport system in Gauteng, South Africa

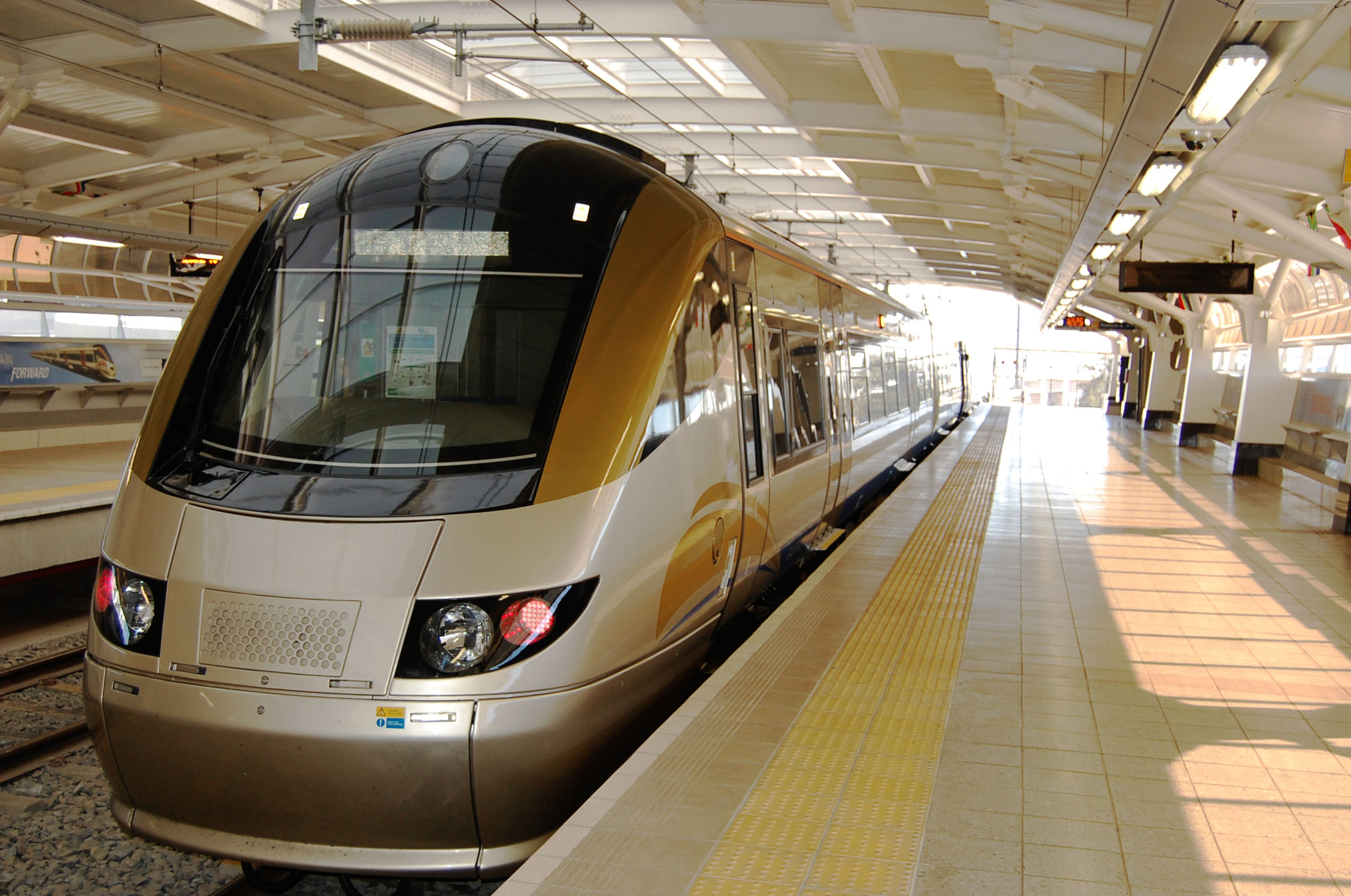
- Bombardier Electrostar at O. R. Tambo International Airport

Overview
- Owner: Gauteng province
- Locale: Gauteng, South Africa
- Transit type: Commuter rail
- Number of stations: 10
- Annual ridership: 7,860,068 (2024/25)
- Website: www.gautrain.co.za

Operation
- Began operation: 8 June 2010 (Sandton to O.R. Tambo International Airport); 7 June 2012 (Full service)
- Operator: RATP Dev
- Number of vehicles: 24 Bombardier Electrostars

Technical
- System length: 80 km (50 mi)
- Track gauge: 1,435 mm (4 ft 8 1/2 in) standard gauge
- Electrification: 25 kV 50 Hz AC
- Top speed: 160 km/h (100 mph)
System map
Gautrain Rapid Rail Link

Gautrain is an 80-kilometre (50-mile) higher-speed express commuter rail system in Gauteng, South Africa, which links Johannesburg, Pretoria, Kempton Park and O. R. Tambo International Airport. It takes 15 minutes to travel from Sandton to O. R. Tambo International Airport on the Gautrain and 35 minutes from Pretoria station to Park Station in Johannesburg. The Gautrain has 10 stations.

Buses, shuttles and midibus services are available for passengers travelling to and from all stations except the O. R. Tambo International Airport Station.

== Background ==
The Gautrain is implemented as a public–private partnership (PPP) in terms of Treasury Regulation 16 of the Public Finance Management Act (PFMA). The Gauteng Provincial Government (GPG) is the public partner and the primary promoter of the project. The concessionaire is the Bombela Concession Company (Pty) Ltd, which holds a 19½-year concession for the design, construction, financing, operation and maintenance of the Gautrain.

BCC is responsible in terms of the Concession Agreement (CA) for the design, build and part-finance of the Gautrain. The concession also includes the operations of the Gautrain. It is a private, ring-fenced company with three shareholders:

- Murray & Roberts is a construction company listed on the Johannesburg Stock Exchange, which operates in Southern Africa, the Middle East, Southeast Asia, Australasia and North and South America;
- SPG Concessions is a broad-based Black Economic Empowerment company represented in all of the concessionaire sub-contracts;
- J&J Group is a South African broad-based investment holding and management company.

== Lines in operation ==
=== Rail ===
The Gautrain system officially features three lines in operation. In practice, two of the three lines represent the same infrastructure and vehicles: on the East/West line, while travelling in the direction of O. R. Tambo International Airport, the commuter and airport passenger flows are separated in different cars. At Rhodesfield station, doors of airport labelled cars are inaccessible, while commuter cars are not accessible at the airport station. The Gautrain has, in the past, experienced periodical suspensions and reduced services during periods of national electricity load shedding, relying on backup power systems to maintain limited operations.

Line	Terminals		Commencement	Newest Extension	Length (km)	Stations
North/South Commuter Service	Hatfield	Park	26 August 2011	7 June 2012		8
East/West Commuter Service	Rhodesfield	Sandton	8 June 2010	—		3
Airport Service	O. R. Tambo International Airport	Sandton	8 June 2010	—		3
Total					80	10

=== Bus ===
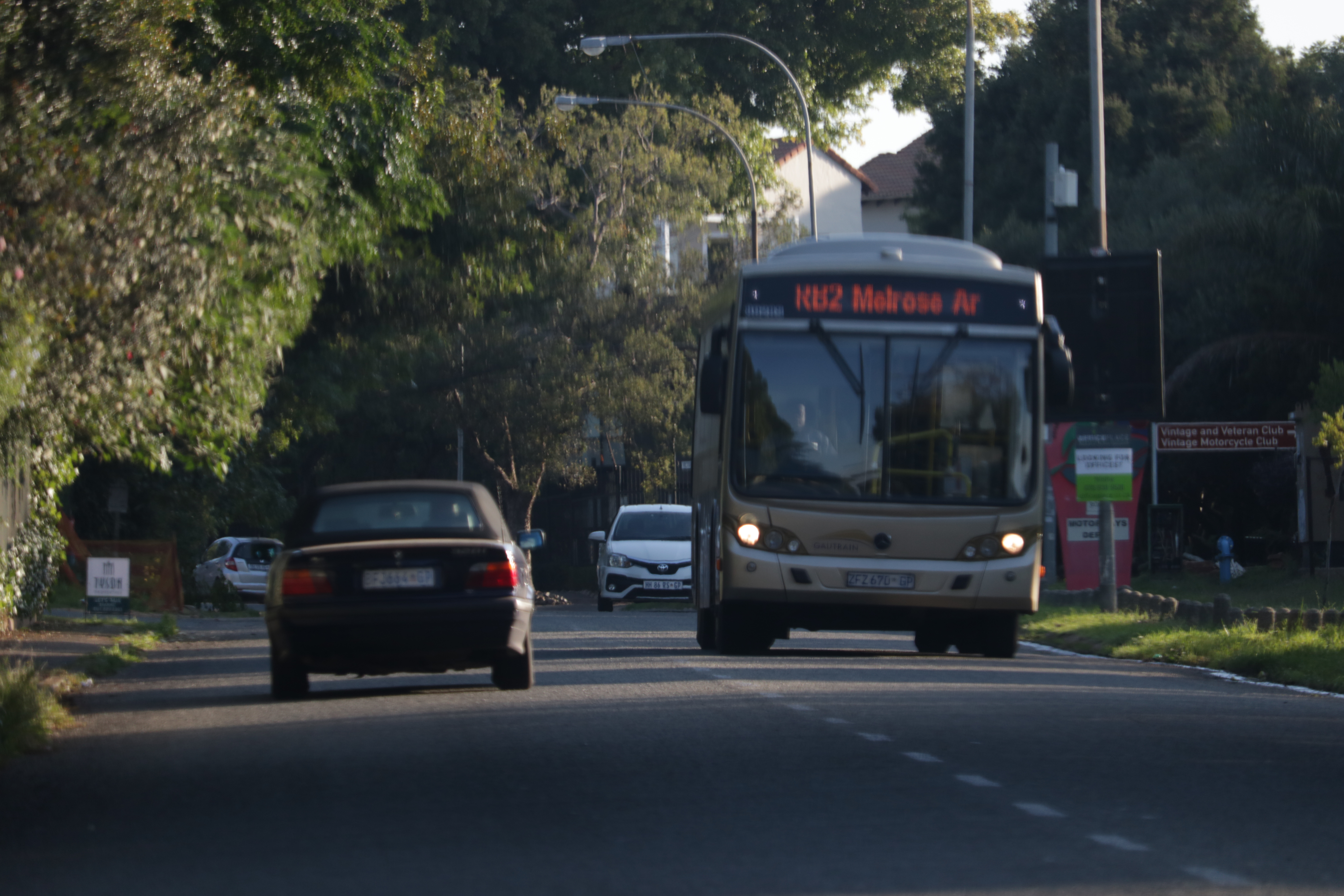
Gautrain buses shuttle taking passengers to Midrand.

The Gautrain system features an extensive network of feeder buses. Some routes are served by regular full-sized buses while others are served by so-called midibuses which are van-like vehicles. There are a total of 6 routes serving Centurion station, 4 routes serving Midrand station, 3 routes serving Rhodesfield station, 4 routes serving Sandton station, 5 routes serving Hatfield station, 6 routes serving Marlboro station, 2 routes serving Park station, 2 routes serving Pretoria station, and 4 routes serving Rosebank station.

== History ==
The project was announced in 2000 before South Africa won the rights to host the 2010 FIFA World Cup.

The Gauteng Department of Transport obtained environmental authorisation and conducted an Environmental Impact Assessment (EIA) for this purpose. The authorisation was granted on 25 April 2004. On 7 December 2005, the South African government gave the go-ahead for the project, expected to cost more than R 24 billion.

In February 2006, Finance Minister Trevor Manuel announced the allocation of R 7.1 billion from the National Fiscus for Gautrain. On 16 February 2006 then Gauteng Premier Mbhazima Shilowa announced that the Gauteng Province had reached commercial close with the Bombela Consortium, the preferred bidder and that negotiations to reach financial close commenced.

In 2006 the Province signed a 20‑year PPP contract with the Bombela Concession Company, which included Murray & Roberts, empowerment organisation Strategic Partners Group, Bombardier Transportation, Bouygues, and various minority shareholders.

Construction started on 28 September 2006, and investors, developers, small businesses, and entrepreneurs are starting new ventures such as office blocks, shopping malls, entertainment, and residential developments along Gautrain's network. The demand for land as well as property prices in these areas increased dramatically.

=== Construction ===
The rail system was built by Bombela Concession Company, a partnership between Bombardier, Bouygues, Murray & Roberts, the Strategic Partners Group and RATP Group, the J&J Group, and Absa Bank.

Initial civil works for the Gautrain started in May 2006 and construction commenced after the signing of the Concession Agreement between the GPG and the Bombela Concession Company on 28 September 2006. The main civil contractor was Murray & Roberts.

The project was constructed simultaneously in two phases. The first phase involved the section between O. R. Tambo International Airport, Sandton and Midrand, and the second was the remainder. The construction of the first phase was scheduled to take 45 months, and the second was for 54 months, with completion in 2010 and 2011.

Construction

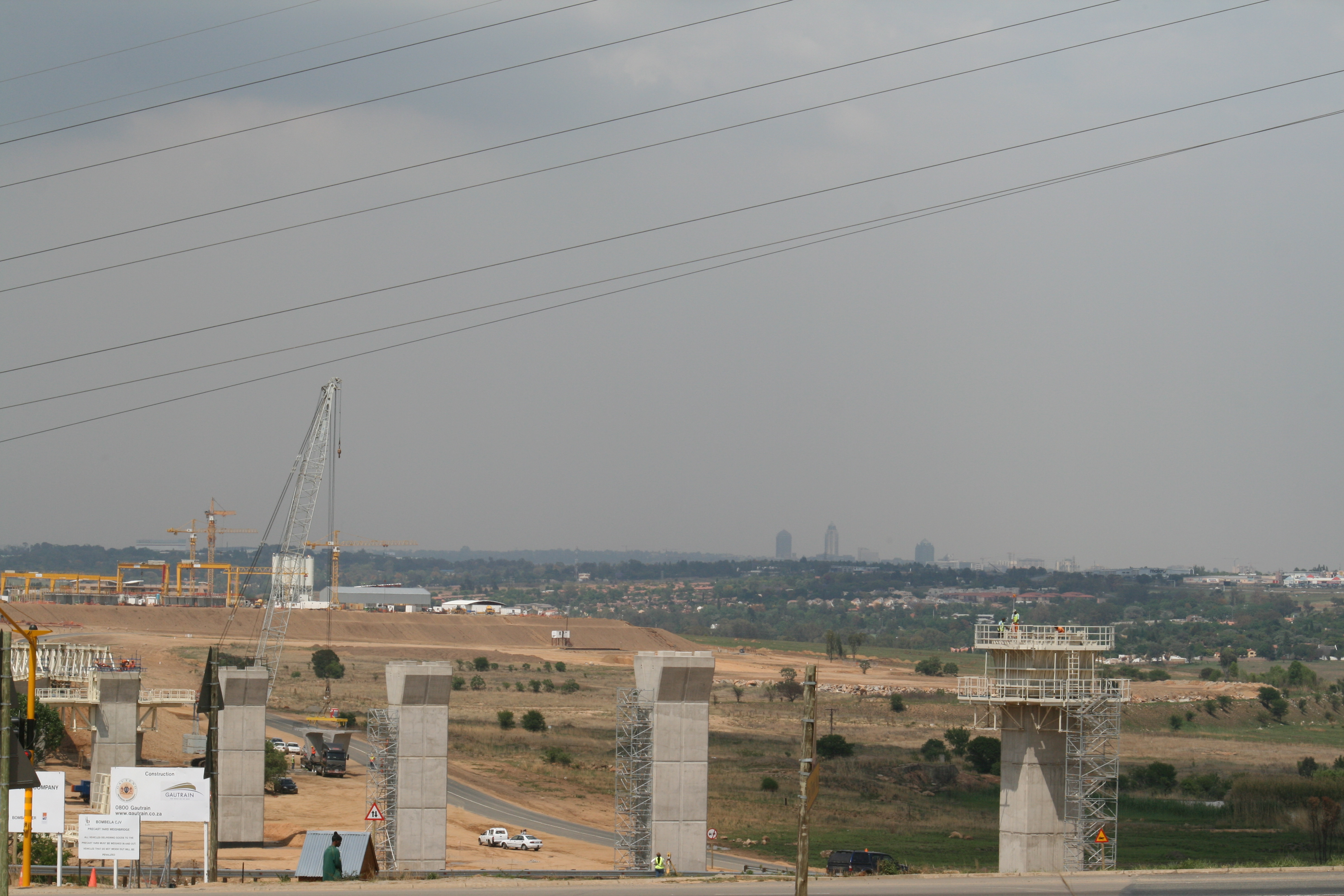
Viaduct support pilons, Midrand in November 2007

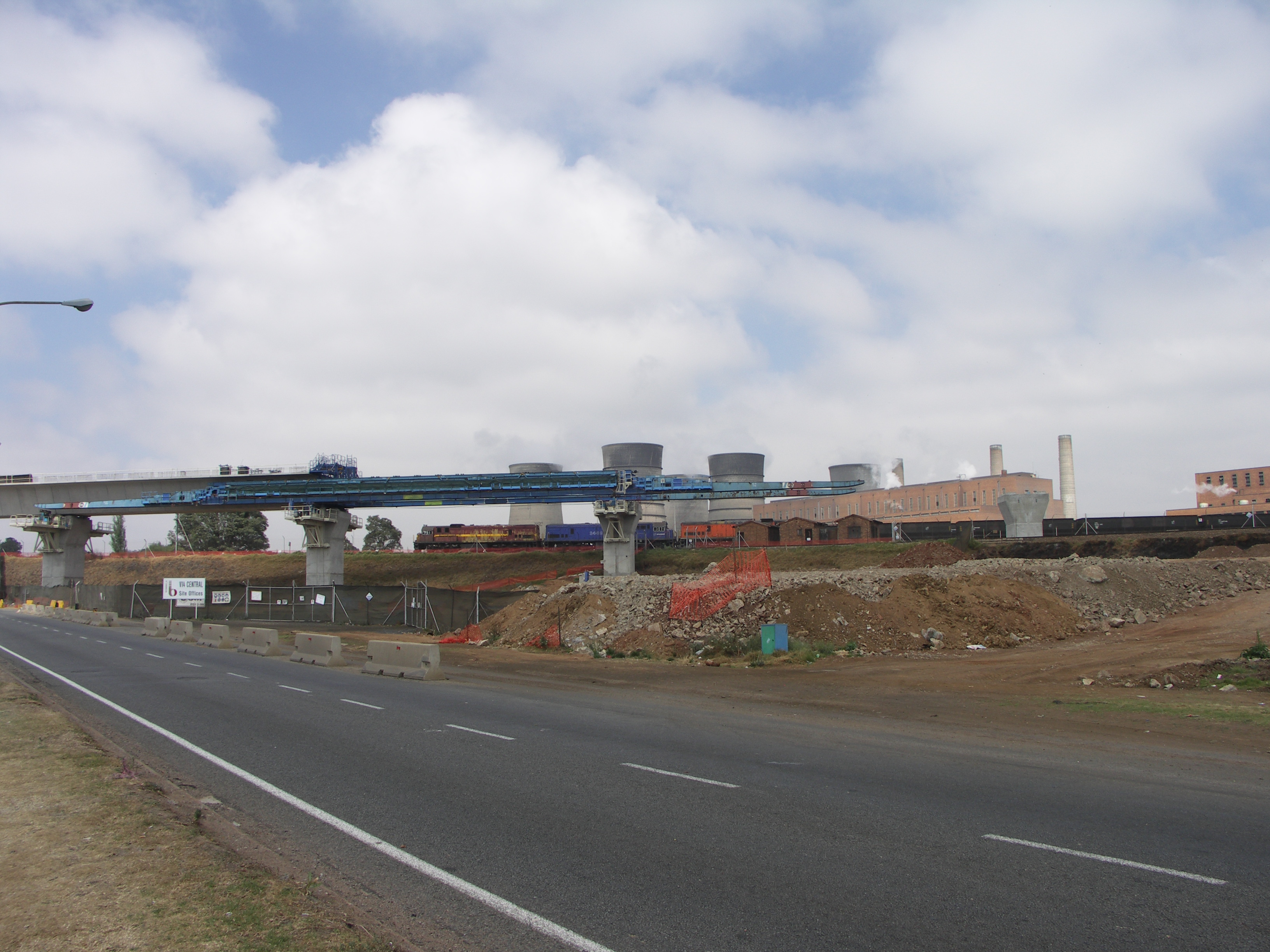
Viaduct in Spartan in September 2008

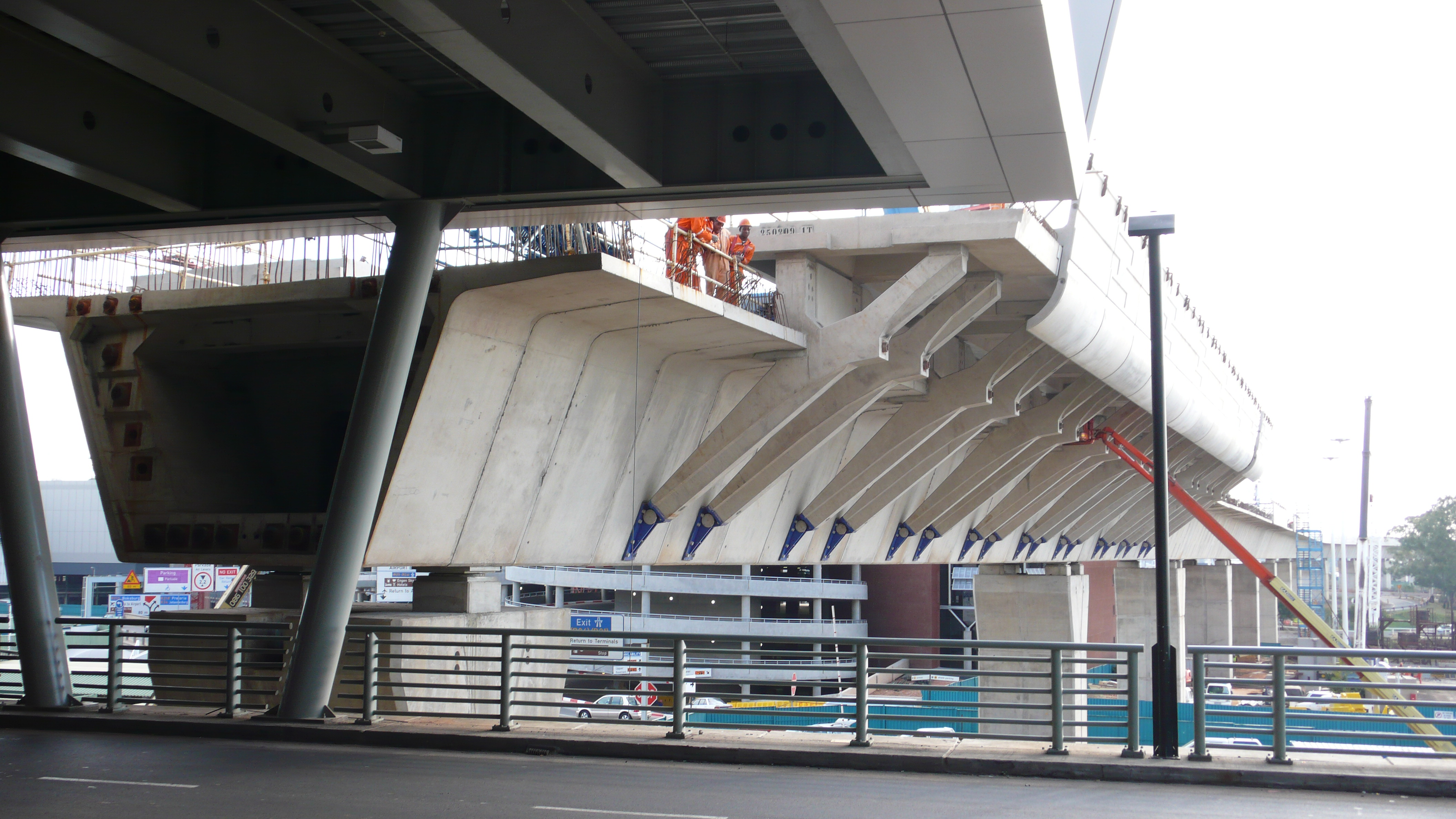
Viaduct at O. R. Tambo International Airport in April 2009

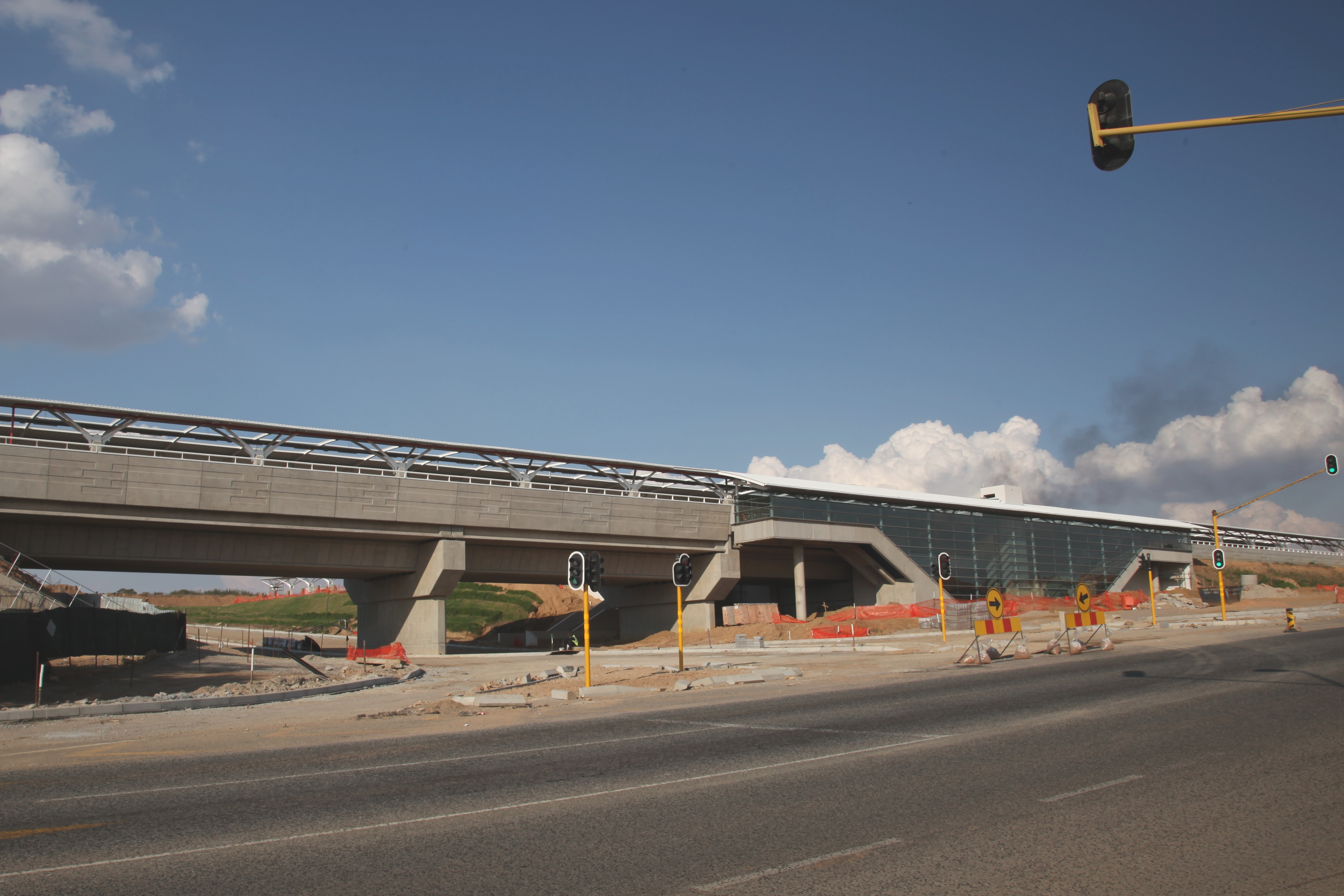
Construction at Midrand station in May 2010

==== Construction technology ====
By the end of May 2008, nearly a third of the tunnelling was completed, and the excavation of the tunnels was completed on 11 September 2009.

A mixed-face Earth Pressure Balance Shield Tunnel Boring Machine (TBM) was designed and built in Germany by Herrenknecht specifically to cope with complex underground conditions and was the first such machine employed in South Africa. The TBM, named Imbokodo (meaning "rock"), installs pre-cast concrete tunnel lining segments behind it as it moves forward. It leaves behind a watertight and smooth lining to the 6.8 m (22 ft 4 in) diameter tunnel.

=== Opening to passenger traffic ===
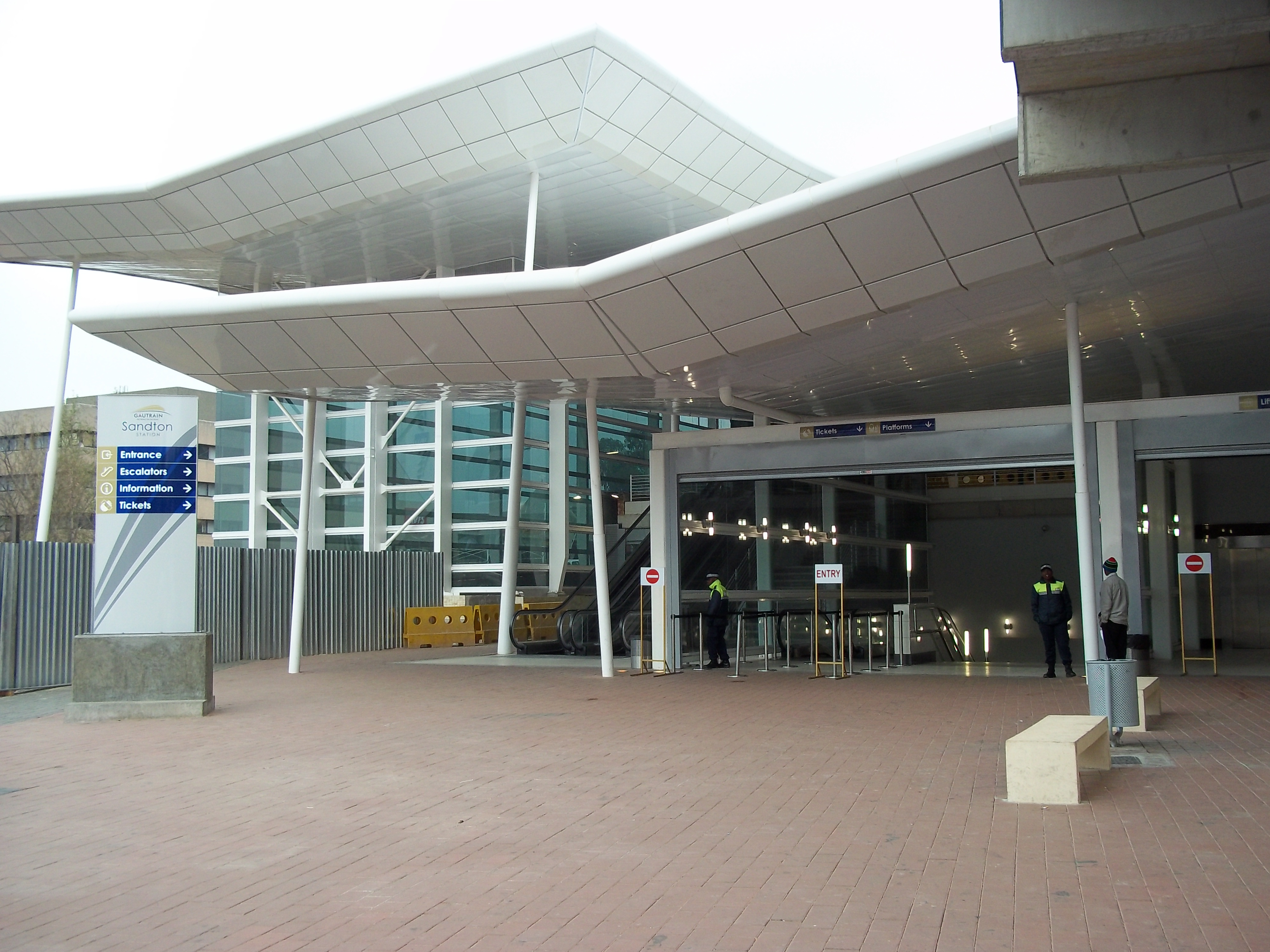
Sandton station in August 2010

The first public passenger trip was made on 3 February 2009 by 150 people on a 3 km (1.9 mi) test track at the depot.

The first part of the System, between Sandton and O. R Tambo International Airport, opened to the public on 8 June 2010, in time for the 2010 FIFA World Cup. The route from Rosebank to Pretoria and Hatfield commenced operations on 2 August 2011, while the remaining section from Rosebank south to Johannesburg Park Station opened on 7 June 2012, due to higher than anticipated underground water ingress into the railway tunnel.

For the first time since its opening to the public in 2010, the Gautrain system had been put to a halt on 27 March 2020 as part of the lockdown measures taken by the South African government during the COVID-19 pandemic. Passenger services started to progressively resume on 4 May 2020.

=== Reconcessioning ===
Anticipating the initial PPP concession expiring in March 2026, the Gautrain Management Agency (GMA) launched a competitive procurement process in November 2023, aiming to select a new "delivery partner" to "operate, maintain, modernise, innovate, and upgrade the current Gautrain system" for a further 15 years. The construction of new network sections are not part of the procurement. The procurement process was still under way as of November 2025, due to extensive regulatory and governance reviews, both at national and provincial government levels. In October 2024, the GMA announced having received bids from the following entities:

- The Jubane consortium, including amongst others Netherlands-based Intertoll Europe, Strategic Partners Group, Sound Plans Trading, Keolis, and the Crowie Holdings Group through its subsidiary Enza Construction
- The Sihamba Sonke Mobility consortium, including amongst others African Infrastructure Investment Managers (AIIM), Alstom, AIH, GIBB-Crede, Motseng Investment Holdings, Nozala, RATP Dev, and Unitrans
- WRIC Concession Company

Given the additional time required to finalise the procurement process for the reconcessioning of the Gautrain system, the GMA appointed Bombela Operating Company (BOC) to continue operating and maintaining the system under a direct six-month holdover arrangement after the end of the original concession period in March 2026, while negotiations with the preferred bidder progressed.

In September 2026, the GMA announced it appointed the Sihamba Sonke Mobility consortium as the winning bidder to manage the Gautrain for the next 15 years through 2041.

As part of the consortium, day-to-day delivery of rail, bus and midibus services will be provided by RATP Dev, while Alstom will provide for eight new locally-manufactured four-car electric multiple units, expanding the total fleet from 24 to 32 trains, as well as the deployment of a new signalling system. Both RATP Dev and Alstom were key partners in the original Gautrain concession as well.

== Infrastructure ==
- Total route length – 80 km (50 mi) (including 15 km (9.3 mi) underground)
- Off-peak frequency – 1 train per 20 min
- Peak frequency – 1 train per 10 min

=== Network ===
The rail network is 80 kilometres (50 miles) long and is connected to other forms of public transport like taxis, buses and the Metrorail public train system. Commuters can also use several Gautrain buses and midibuses to destinations within a 15-kilometre (9.3-mile) radius.

Fares on the Johannesburg/Pretoria route vary according to the peak, shoulder peak and off-peak times, depending on the distance. The fare on the Gautrain Bus Link for a rail user varies from R9 during peak and R2 during off-peak times; for the midibuses, the fare is a standard R10 per trip. The method of payment on Gautrain buses uses the same personalized electronic ticket as for train travel, requiring a minimum balance of R20.00 for boarding a bus. To board the midibuses, tickets are bought at the midibus counter at the station. Special discounts apply on the purchase of weekly and monthly passes as well as the use of the train during off-peak periods. Tickets can only be purchased at stations and selected retail outlets and not on any bus. Commuters can now use contactless bank cards to tag in and out of the Gautrain Stations.

=== Tracks ===
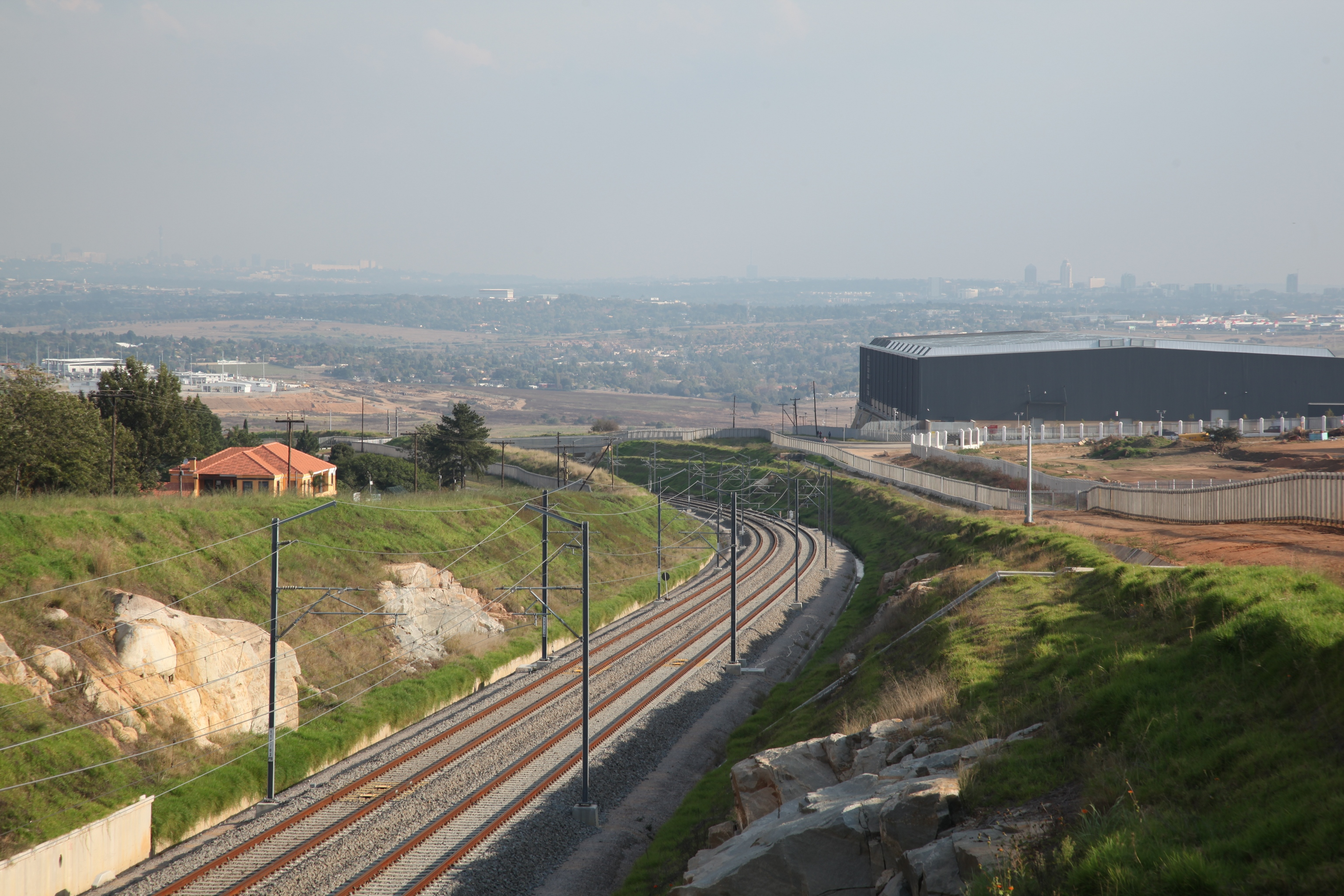
Gautrain tracks in Midrand

Although the national railway network in South Africa uses the 1,067 mm (3 ft 6 in), Gautrain is built with the wider international standard gauge of 1,435 mm (4 ft 8 1/2 in) standard gauge. According to the Gautrain planning and implementation study, this is done for several reasons, including that a broader gauge is safer and more comfortable for passengers. The rolling stock is also easier, quicker and less expensive to obtain than Cape gauge rolling stock, and is also less expensive to maintain, as it is more tolerant of track imperfections than Cape Gauge. The 1,435 mm (4 ft 8 1/2 in) allows for travel at Gautrain's required speed of 160 km/h (99 mph). The overhead line voltage is 25 kV 50 Hz AC as is standard in many countries.

=== Stations ===
Security cameras are operational and security guards patrol all the stations and parking areas. Only passengers who have an electronic ticket have access to Gautrain's stations and the parking areas. Motorists can travel to the stations and leave their cars at the safe parking bays that are next to the train stations. Parking at the stations costs R24 a day for a rail user, however, if a passenger does not remove their vehicle within an hour after arriving at the station, they will be charged R100. Car rental offices are also planned at the stations.

Ten stations are in operation:

- Hatfield (at grade)
- Pretoria (at grade)
- Centurion (elevated)
- Midrand (at grade)
- Marlboro (at grade)
- Sandton (underground)
- Rosebank (underground)
- Park Station (underground)
- Rhodesfield (elevated)
- O. R. Tambo International Airport (elevated)

Various South African and international engineering disciplines and engineering firms collaborated in the design of the system as a whole. Midrand, Centurion and Pretoria stations was designed by Terry Farrell of England. Each platform is 160 metres in length. Marlboro, Rhodesfield and OR Tambo International Airport Station's internal fit-out and platform envelope were designed by Jaco Groenewald and GAJV team. The OR Tambo International Airport Station envelope was designed by Izi Martinez during the OR Tambo International Airport upgrade. Rosebank and Johannesburg Park stations were designed by Atkins – Urban Edge architects joint venture.

=== Ticketing ===
A cash-free ticketing system and the use of reloadable smart cards, the Gautrain Card makes travelling on the Gautrain quick and convenient. Passengers can buy their Gautrain Cards at any Gautrain Station as well as approved service outlets. Europay, Mastercard and Visa contactless cards are also usable on Gautrain.

=== Rolling stock ===
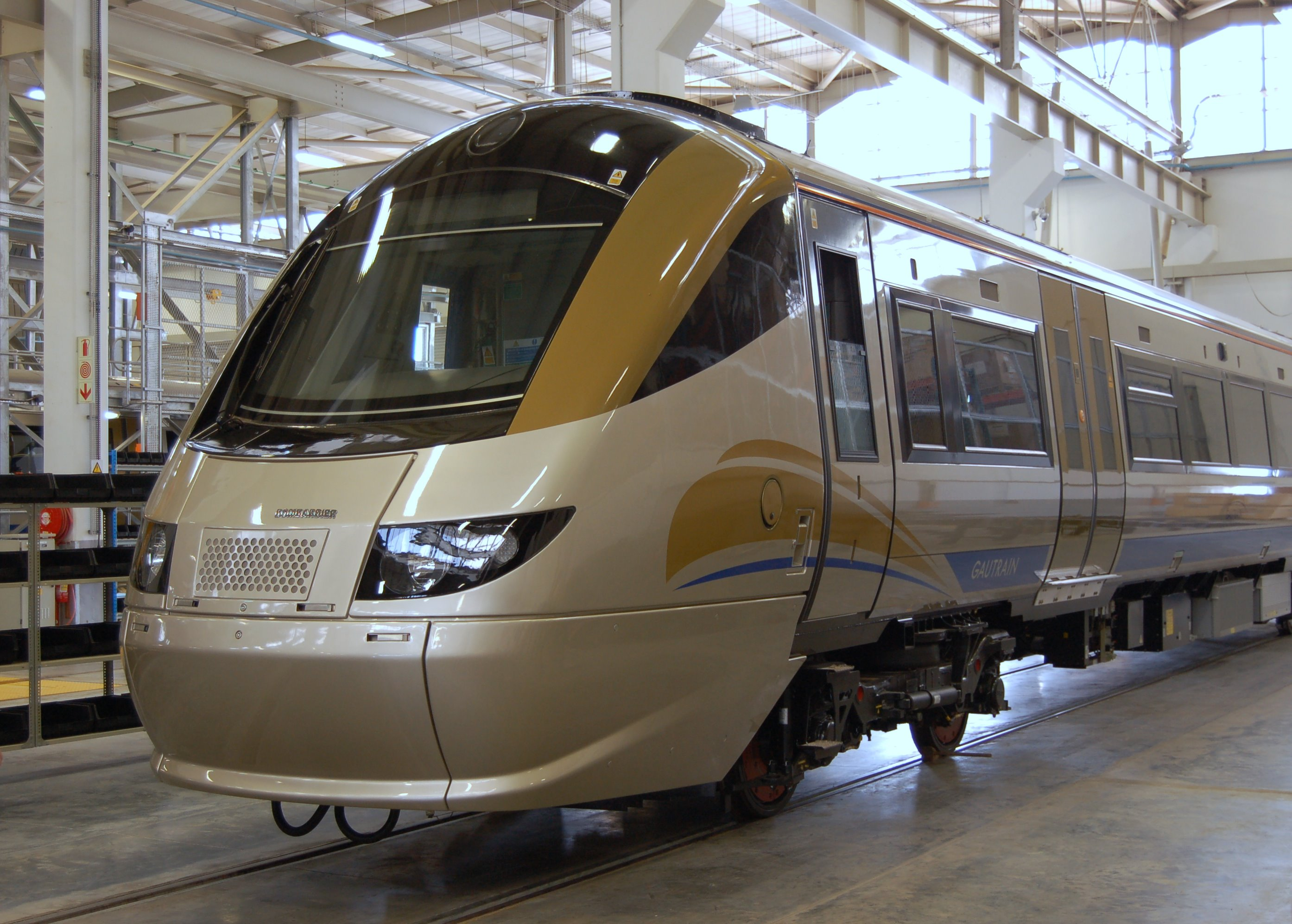
A Bombardier Electrostar at the depot

The Bombardier Electrostar, a model of a train common in South East England, was selected for the system. Fifteen cars were manufactured and assembled by Bombardier's Derby Litchurch Lane Works in England, with the remaining cars assembled by the Union Carriage & Wagon in South Africa using structural components made in England. Gautrain has 24 trains, each made up of four cars: 19 trains service the commuter network and five the airport link; the latter consists of forward rail cars especially adapted for the airport link; with storage area for luggage and more luxurious seating.

On 8 July 2008, the first train was handed over to the Gauteng Premier Mbhazima Shilowa in a ceremony in Derby. The last was delivered in December 2010.

There were plans for the acquisition of additional trains. In 2019, Gautrain investigated purchasing some second-hand Electrostars from England. The project entailed the development of new depot facilities and the upgrading of the existing Gautrain signaling system. The additional train project was expected to have a significant and positive socio-economic impact in the Province as the Gauteng Provincial Government said it would insist on at least 65 percent local content by the successful bidder. The plans were cancelled due to the COVID-19 pandemic and have not been revived since then.

== Criticism ==
Much of the criticism is that money is being spent on the rich at the expense of the poor. Critics contend that it does not serve any of the townships of Gauteng where the transport problem is severe and where the majority of the people live. However, supporters maintain that the train was never meant to be an alternative to mass public transport; instead, it was intended to reduce pressure on Johannesburg's overloaded highway system. Figures released by the Gauteng provincial government in 2003 indicated that the project would do little to relieve traffic on the over-used Ben Schoeman Highway (one of the major motivations for the project), as traffic volumes would be higher when the Gautrain was completed and operating at full capacity in 2010. Leftist political groupings like the SACP and labour movements like COSATU branded the Gautrain as a train for the rich and called on the government not to proceed with the project. A national parliamentary oversight body, the Transport Portfolio Committee, held public hearings in November 2005 and subsequently advised Cabinet to scrap or postpone the project. However, National Cabinet decided on 7 December 2005 to financially support Gautrain.

=== Ridership ===
Critics have questioned ridership estimates, stating that government officials almost always overestimate ridership to gain political approval for projects, and cite numerous international examples where similar projects operate at massive losses or were aborted. However, by October 2010, passenger numbers were in line with previous predictions and growing. Within 100 days of opening the first phase of the system for the public, 1 million passengers were recorded. As of February 2013, passenger volume was around 40,000 per day by train and 12,000 by bus. This is lower than expected in terms of passenger numbers, but this is partially offset by a longer average trip length (50 km vs the expected 30 km). Peak volumes are higher than expected, though, which can be addressed by adding more coaches during peak times, and reducing the headway between trains from 12 to 10 minutes ahead of the intended 2015 schedule. Tolling on Gauteng highways (which was discontinued on 12 April 2024) was also expected to lead to higher passenger numbers.

=== Alternative transportation projects ===
Critics pointed out that the project would use the majority of available national and provincial transport funds in a context where massive amounts were needed to deal with widespread traffic congestion and commuter transport problems nationally and in the province. The existing railway system in the province, under national rather than provincial control, which serves the majority of the population, was severely underfunded and large-scale and violent public unrest caused by inadequate and old trains had manifested in the province. Critics alleged that options like rapid bus transit could achieve similar levels of service at a fraction of the costs, however, the estimated 62,000 daily riders require a capacity unfeasible by BRT. These matters were never submitted to a public debate as the project was designed and launched within the confines of the Gauteng Government bureaucracy.

=== Cost ===
The project is the largest and costliest transport infrastructure project ever proposed by the provincial government but was never discussed in the Gauteng Provincial Legislature or submitted to any significant public debate before it was approved and put out to tender. Initial cost estimates came in at some R3.5 – 4 billion in 2000 when the project was announced by Premier Shilowa. This figure was revised upwards to R7 billion for the EIA process in 2003 and was finally revealed as being R20 billion (US$3.7 billion) in 2005 after the successful bidder for the project was announced and a contract came into existence. National and provincial governments will contribute R20 billion in equal proportions and Bombela will contribute the balance of direct project costs. Loan funding will constitute a large part of these amounts but the financing costs involved have not been stated. The sunk costs for the project will be more than R20 billion. In March 2008, Jeremy Cronin, chairman of the National Assembly's transport portfolio committee and deputy secretary-general of the SACP, complained that the cost had quietly crept up to R35 billion. Cronin has long opposed the project and told the SA Parliament's lower house during a budget debate that his information was that the project's cost was escalating "quietly and below the radar screen", though MPs "were told, hand on heart, here in Parliament just a few years ago, what the written-in-stone absolute upper limit was [R20 billion]". The Gautrain management agency CEO, Jack van der Merwe, has subsequently denied this, stating that the project is a fixed-price, fixed-scope and fixed-period contract and that the price will only increase if the consumer price index increases above the South African Reserve Bank's prediction, if the Gauteng Province were in breach of contract, or if the project's scope were to change.

==== Cost estimates and timeline ====
Year	Estimated Cost
2002	R3.5 billion
2003	R7 billion
2005	R20 billion
2006	R25.2 billion, approved
2010	R26 billion
2011	R25.4 billion ($3.66 billion)

==== Cash flow ====
Hatfield station in Pretoria stopped paying its municipal property rates and taxes in 2020. By February 2022 they were R10 million in arrears and their power was disconnected.

== Future ==
=== Modernisation ===
The concession agreement signed with the Sihamba Sonke Mobility consortium in September 2026, which covers a 15-year operations and maintenance term, includes, according to the GMA, plans for progressive investment and modernisation across the Gautrain system, among which:

- Increased train frequency during weekday off-peak periods and extended operating hours
- Expansion of the fleet from 24 to 32 four-car electric multiple units
- Improved integration between Gautrain trains and feeder bus services
- Additional feeder routes and midibuses
- Upgrades to stations, facilities and depots
- Improved security and passenger information systems
- Full backup power provision for stations
- A planned 30% renewable energy contribution across stations and depots
- The progressive introduction of account-based ticketing and an integrated Mobility-as-a-Service digital platform

=== Network expansion ===
In 2016, the GMA completed various feasibility studies for network extensions, and submitted those proposals to National Treasury in 2017. Approvals are still pending and no further progress has been made with regard to network extensions.

The 2016 feasibility studies identified the following potential corridors:

- Marlboro to Soweto with stations at Sandton, Randburg, Cosmo City, Little Falls, Roodepoort, and Jabulani
- Jabulani to Mamelodi with stations at Roodeport, Little Falls, Cosmo City, Fourways, Sunninghill, Olievenhoutsbosch, Samrand, Irene, Tshwane East, Hazeldean, Mamelodi
- Rhodesfield to Boksburg with a station at East Rand Mall
- Cosmo City to Lanseria with a station at Cradle

According to those studies, the preferred first extension is the first leg of the link between Marlboro and Soweto, with stations at Cosmo City, Little Falls, Randburg, and Sandton.

In August 2024, the Gauteng Premier Panyaza Lesufi announced an R120 billion expansion of the network to extend service to Soweto, Mamelodi, Atteridgeville, Lanseria, and Springs.
