= M38 (Johannesburg) =

Metropolitan route in the City of Johannesburg, South Africa

Metropolitan route M38

Route information
- Maintained by Johannesburg Roads Agency and Gauteng Department of Roads and Transport
- Length: 16.9 km (10.5 mi)

Major junctions
- West end: R553 near Diepkloof
- M68 at Southgate; M5 near Ridgeway; M17 at Ridgeway; M7 at Gillview; M11 at Oakdene; M19 at The Hill; R59 at Tulisa Park

- East end: M46 / M31 at Tulisa Park

Location
- Country: South Africa

Highway system
- Numbered routes of South Africa
← M37	→ M39

The M38 is a short metropolitan route in Johannesburg, South Africa. The entire route is in the Johannesburg South area, connecting Southgate with Tulisa Park via Ridgeway. It is parallel to the Johannesburg Southern Bypass (N12 highway) for its entire route.

There is also a short route in the eastern part of Midrand that is designated as the M38.

== Route ==
The M38 begins at a junction with the R553 road in the Eikenhof suburb of Johannesburg South. It begins by going north-east as Main Road through Meredale to meet the M68 road in the Southgate suburb, bypassing the Southgate Shopping Centre. It passes under the N12 highway (Johannesburg Southern Bypass) and meets the southern terminus of the M5 road (Nasrec Road) before turning eastwards to pass under the M1 highway.

It passes through the suburb of Ridgeway eastwards as Rifle Range Road and meets the M17 road (Xavier Street) before passing through the Gillview suburb and meeting the M7 road (Kliprivier Drive). It continues eastwards to become Veroma Road and meet the M11 road (Prairie Street) at Oakdene (south of Rosettenville). It becomes South Rand Road and proceeds eastwards, meeting the M19 road at The Hill, to enter the suburb of Tulisa Park, where it meets the northern terminus of the R59 highway (Sybrand van Niekerk Freeway) before reaching its end at a junction with the M31 road (Voortrekker Road). The road continuing eastwards becomes the M46 road towards Rand Airport and Germiston.

== M38 (Midrand) ==
There is a short 13 km road in Midrand that is designated as the M38. It starts at a T-junction with the M18 road at the south-western corner of the Thembisa Township, heading northwards as Modderfontein Road. It passes through the far eastern suburbs of Midrand, first passing by Commercia, then Rabie Ridge (where it junctions with Dane Road), then President Park (west of Ebony Park/Kaalfontein/Ivory Park; where it junctions with Republic Road), then Glen Austin (where it becomes Allan Road), to reach its end at a junction with the R562 road (Winnie Madikizela-Mandela Road) south of Randjesfontein Agricultural Holdings (east of Randjespark).
