= R55 (South Africa) =

Road in South Africa

Provincial route R55

Route information
- Maintained by GDRT (Woodmead past Laudium), City of Tshwane Metropolitan Municipality
- Length: 43.8 km (27.2 mi)

Major junctions
- South end: M11 / R101 near Woodmead
- M1 near Woodmead; R564 near Woodmead; R562 near Bridle Park; N14 near Olievenhoutbosch; R114 in Centurion; R104 in Pretoria West; R514 in Claremont, Pretoria
- North end: R80 in Daspoort, Pretoria

Location
- Country: South Africa
- Major cities: Sandton, Centurion, Midrand, Pretoria

Highway system
- Numbered routes of South Africa
← R54	→ R56

The R55 is a north-south provincial route in Gauteng, South Africa that connects Sandton with Pretoria. It passes Woodmead, Kyalami, Olievenhoutbosch, Heuweloord, Sunderland Ridge, Erasmia, Laudium/Claudius, West Park, the Daspoort Tunnel and Danville. It connects with the M1, N14, and R80 highways. It also has dual carriageway sections designated as the P66-1 and K71 by the Gauteng Department of Roads and Transport.

== Route ==
Detailed Route

The southern terminus of the R55 is a t-junction with the M11/R101 Pretoria Main Road south of Buccleuch. It then crosses and interchanges the M1 De Villiers Graaff motorway/Ben Schoeman Highway as it heads northwards through Woodmead. Leaving Woodmead, it crosses under the N1 highway (Western Bypass) before interchanging with the R564 (Maxwell Drive) in Sunninghill. It continues into Barbeque Downs before crossing the Jukskei River into Kyalami where it intersects the M39 Allandale Road. Leaving the Kyalami Estate, the M71 Main Road t-junctions the route and they are co-signed for a few metres up to Crowthorne, where the M71 becomes the road eastwards towards Grand Central Airport and the Midrand CBD. Continuing north-east, it passes through the Blue Hills agricultural holdings, crossing the R562 (Summit Road) and entering Centurion, passing through the suburb of Olievenhoutbosch, where it becomes a dual carriageway. It then intersects the N14 highway at Junction 317.

Shortly after crossing the N14, it intersects the R114 in the Heuweloord suburb of Centurion. Heading northwards, the M10 intersects the route from the east close to Sunderland Ridge and later the M24 from the west, close to the Zwartkops Raceway. Continuing to Laudium, the M26 intercepts the route just south of the suburb. Leaving Laudium towards the northeast, it enters Pretoria as Quagga Road and reaches an intersection, where Quagga Road becomes the M22 and the R55 turns north as Transoranje Road, passing in-between West Park and Proclamation Hill before crossing the R104 and the M4 Magalies Toll Freeway. The R55 Transoranje Road heads north through Danville where it passes through the Daspoort Tunnel.

Leaving the tunnel, it continues north through Claremont, Daspoort and Booysens, crossing the R80 Mabopane Highway intersection and after a short distance ends as a t-junction with Denyssen Avenue in Suiderberg, Northern Pretoria.

== History/Future ==
Although parts of the road in Johannesburg were widened in 2005, other single-lane sections of the route, especially in Centurion, were in a dangerous state, due to the high volumes of traffic and presence of heavy vehicles causing the road surface to deteriorate.

Renovation of a section in Centurion between the N14 and M10/Wierda Road intersection near Sunderland Ridge began in 2007, with construction largely completed by September 2010. The large Monavoni Circle was replaced with traffic lights, and a dual carriageway was built in this section, with surfaced shoulders to replace the existing narrow two-lane single carriageway.

Also, as a result of a fatal accident the existing N14 offramp from Centurion was converted into a four-way stop temporarily, and traffic lights were later installed.

Extension of the 4 lane dual-carriageway, to replace the section between the M10/Wierda Road intersection and Erasmia, a narrow two-lane single carriageway, passing over the Hennops River, which was overloaded and had severely deteriorated, began in late 2010, and was largely completed by late 2012, along with the installation of lighting on the newly constructed sections, including the previously rebuilt section between Weirda Road and the N14. The remaining provincially maintained (existing) dual-carriageway stretch beyond Erasmia, and part of the municipality-owned section beyond Laudium to the Maunde Street entrance to Atteridgeville was rehabilitated in 2014.
