= R562 (South Africa) =

Regional route in South Africa

Regional route R562

Route information
- Maintained by Gauteng Department of Roads and Transport
- Length: 27 km (17 mi)

Major junctions
- West end: N14 / R511 in Diepsloot
- R55 in Midrand; N1 in Midrand; R101 in Midrand
- East end: R21 near Thembisa

Location
- Country: South Africa
- Major cities: Diepsloot; Midrand; Clayville; Thembisa

Highway system
- Numbered routes of South Africa
← R561	→ R563

The R562 is a Regional Route in Gauteng, South Africa that connects Diepsloot with Olifantsfontein (Clayville) and Thembisa via Midrand.

== Route ==
Its western terminus is an intersection with the R511 road (Winnie Mandela Drive) and the N14 highway at Diepsloot. It heads east as Summit Road, passing by Bridle Park and crossing the R55 (Main Road) to enter Midrand.

At the junction with the R55, the R562 changes its street name to Olifantsfontein Road and continues eastwards, separating the Country View and Noordwyk suburbs of Midrand. Just after Noordwyk, the R562 meets the N1 highway (Ben Schoeman Highway) and crosses it to enter the suburb of Randjespark.

Just after the N1 interchange, the R562 forms an intersection with the R101 (Old Pretoria Main Road). The R562 joins the R101 northwards for 1.6 km before it becomes its own road eastwards, named Winnie Madikizela-Mandela Drive (previously Olifantsfontein Road), to form the northern border of the Glen Austin suburb. Just after the Randjesfontein suburb of Midrand, the R562 leaves the City of Johannesburg Metropolitan Municipality and enters the City of Ekurhuleni Metropolitan Municipality.

In Ekurhuleni, the R562 forms the southern border of the town of Olifantsfontein (Clayville) and the northern border of the township of Thembisa. It forms a junction with the M57 metropolitan route just south of Clayville East before reaching its eastern terminus at an interchange with the R21 highway.
