= Midrand (Gautrain station) =

Railway station near Johannesburg, South Africa

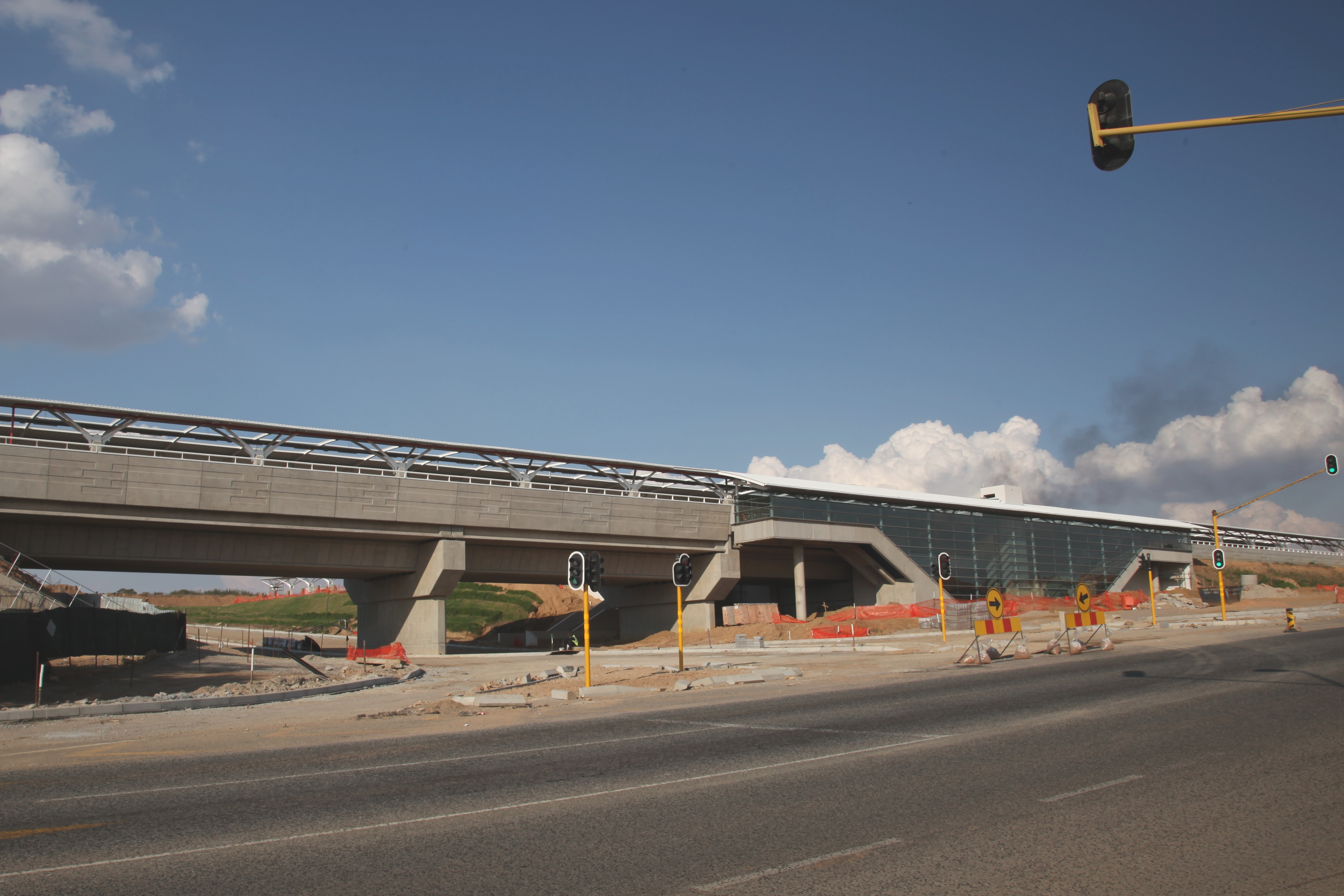
- Midrand station under construction in May 2010

General information
- Location: Old Pretoria Main Road; Midrand, Gauteng 1685
- Coordinates: 25.9954°S 28.1348°E
- System: Gautrain rapid transit station
- Line: North–South Line
- Platforms: 2 side platforms
- Tracks: 2

Construction
- Accessible: yes

History
- Opened: 02 August 2011

Services
Preceding station	Gautrain	Following station
Marlboro towards Park Station	North–South Line	Centurion towards Hatfield
Location

Midrand is a metro station on the Gautrain rapid transit system in Midrand, Gauteng. It opened on 2 August 2011 as part of the second phase of the Gautrain project.

== Location ==
Midrand station is located in the area of the same name within Region A of the City of Johannesburg. One of the city's metropolitan nodes, of secondary importance within the metropolitan area, the Midrand district is expected to become the hub of activity in far north Johannesburg, near the border with the City of Tshwane, which contains the administrative capital city of Pretoria. Near the station are the well-known Gallagher Convention Centre and Kyalami race track. Further, the station lies adjacent to Grand Central Airport, one of Gauteng's secondary airports; the opening of Gautrain's second phase links the airport to the busier OR Tambo International Airport, albeit with a transfer at Sandton.

=== Transit-oriented development ===
In common with other Gautrain stations, Midrand station acts as the focal point of transit-oriented development. The most prominent of the initiatives near the station is the Zonk'izizwe development, which will be situated on the eastern side of the railway alignment and will have a town centre, commercial, and residential precincts surrounding Grand Central Airport. Further south is the Waterfall Estate development, which will encompass a far larger undeveloped site along the N1 between Allandale Road and the N3. Waterfall will include standard residential and commercial districts but will also contain a retirement centre, cemetery, Islamic centre, and industrial zones an SD the new shopping centre Mall of Africa

== Station layout ==
Midrand station has two tracks with two side platforms and parking for 800 cars.

== Services ==
After its opening in 2011, trains on the North-South Line of the Gautrain system serve Midrand station, running northbound to Pretoria and Hatfield and southbound to Sandton and Johannesburg Park Station. In addition, Midrand has four integrated feeder bus routes to Vorna Valley (MID1), Randjespark (MID2), Noordwyk (MID3), and Kyalami Estates (MID4).
