= Grand Central Water Tower Midrand =

Midrand / Grand Central Water Tower Midrand
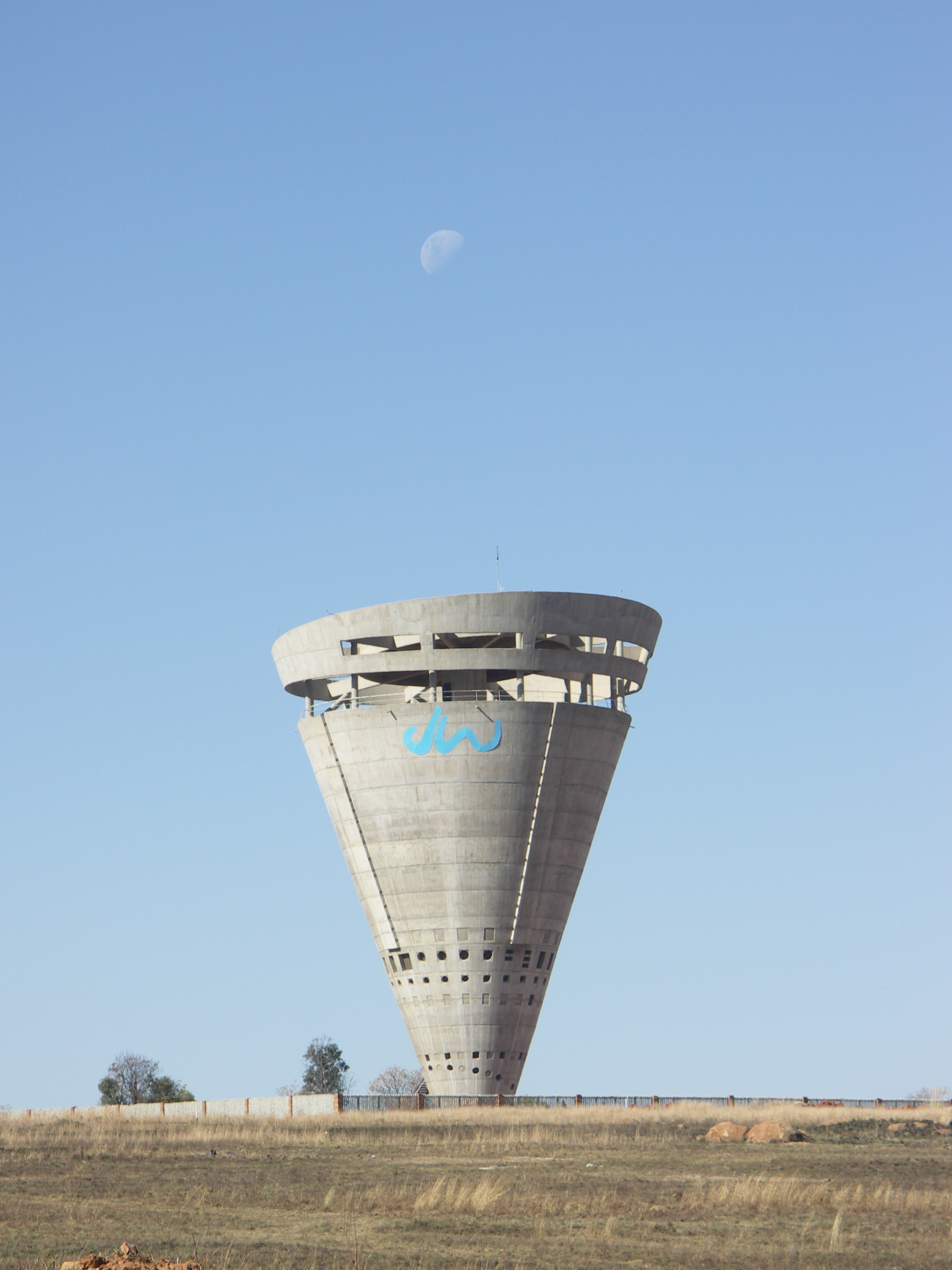
- Grand Central Water Tower, Midrand, Gauteng

- Location within South Africa

General information
- Type: Water tower
- Location: Midrand, Gauteng
- Coordinates: 25°59′37.4″S 28°08′19.5″E
- Construction started: 1997

Height
- Tip: 40 m (131 ft)

Design and construction
- Architecture firm: GAPP Architects & Urban Designers

The Grand Central Water Tower Midrand near Johannesburg in South Africa is an exceptional water tower, both considering its design as a concrete container in the shape of an inverted cone, and also considering the volume of the tower: 6500 m³. It was built in 1997 and is located near Grand Central Airport in Midrand.
