= CTI Education Group =

- Motto: You're Made For Life
- Type: Education
- Established: 1979
- Location: Fourways, Gauteng, South Africa
- Campus: Bedfordview, Bloemfontein, Cape Town, Durban, Durbanville, East London, Nelspruit, Port Elizabeth, Potchefstroom, Pretoria, Randburg, Vanderbijlpark, Midrand
- Colours: Black, White and Red
- Website: http://www.cti.co.za

The CTI Education Group (CTI) was a registered, private higher education institution in South Africa. Full-time and part-time students can study within the fields of Information Technology, Psychology & Counselling, Creative Arts & Graphic Design, Commerce and Law on campuses spread throughout South Africa.

== History ==
CTI was incepted in 1979 and formed a partnership with the private university, Midrand Graduate Institute (MGI) in 2006. CTI, formerly known as the Computer Training Institute broadened its horizons with this and various other partnerships to include, not only computer related education, but other fields such as Graphic Design, Commerce, Accounting, Law and Psychology. CTI grew from one campus situated in Randburg, to having 13 remote campuses located across South Africa (this also includes the MGI campus situated in Midrand)

In November 2010, an education organisation, Pearson Education, acquired 75% stake in CTI Education Group, with regulatory approval in 2011. CTI fully became part of Pearson in 2013 and in 2019, all CTI and MGI campuses were rebranded as the Pearson Institute of Higher Education (PIHE). in November 2020, Pearson announced the disposal of its interests in the PIHE and the NetEd Group purchased the institution and rebranded it as Eduvos.

CTI was also an official UNISA licensee for tuition support, offering on-campus lectures, support and examination for the UNISA LLB degree.

== International Educational Relationship ==
With the launch of the new Higher Education Quality Committee (HEQC) accredited degrees, CTI established a partnership with the Cardiff Metropolitan University which supports the quality-assurance of the degrees according to international standards and ensures that the quality is of equivalent standing to a UK degree. Graduates will have the opportunity to apply for postgraduate studies at many other UK universities abroad. Students, who have successfully completed the CTI Higher certificates, moderated and quality assured by Cardiff Metropolitan University may be considered for direct entry to Cardiff Metropolitan University's bachelor's or master's degrees, provided they meet all other necessary entry criteria. Students could also benefit from Cardiff Metropolitan University's outward mobility programme, which involves the exchange of students between CTI in South Africa and Cardiff Metropolitan University in the UK.

== Locations ==
CTI had 12 campuses around South Africa, which included Bedfordview, Bloemfontein, Cape Town, Durban, Durbanville, East London, Nelspruit, Port Elizabeth, Potchefstroom, Pretoria, Randburg, Vanderbijlpark, as well as the MGI campus in Midrand. CTI's Head Office and International Students Office was located in Fourways.
