= Transport in Johannesburg =

Johannesburg has several public transport options.

== Heavy rail ==
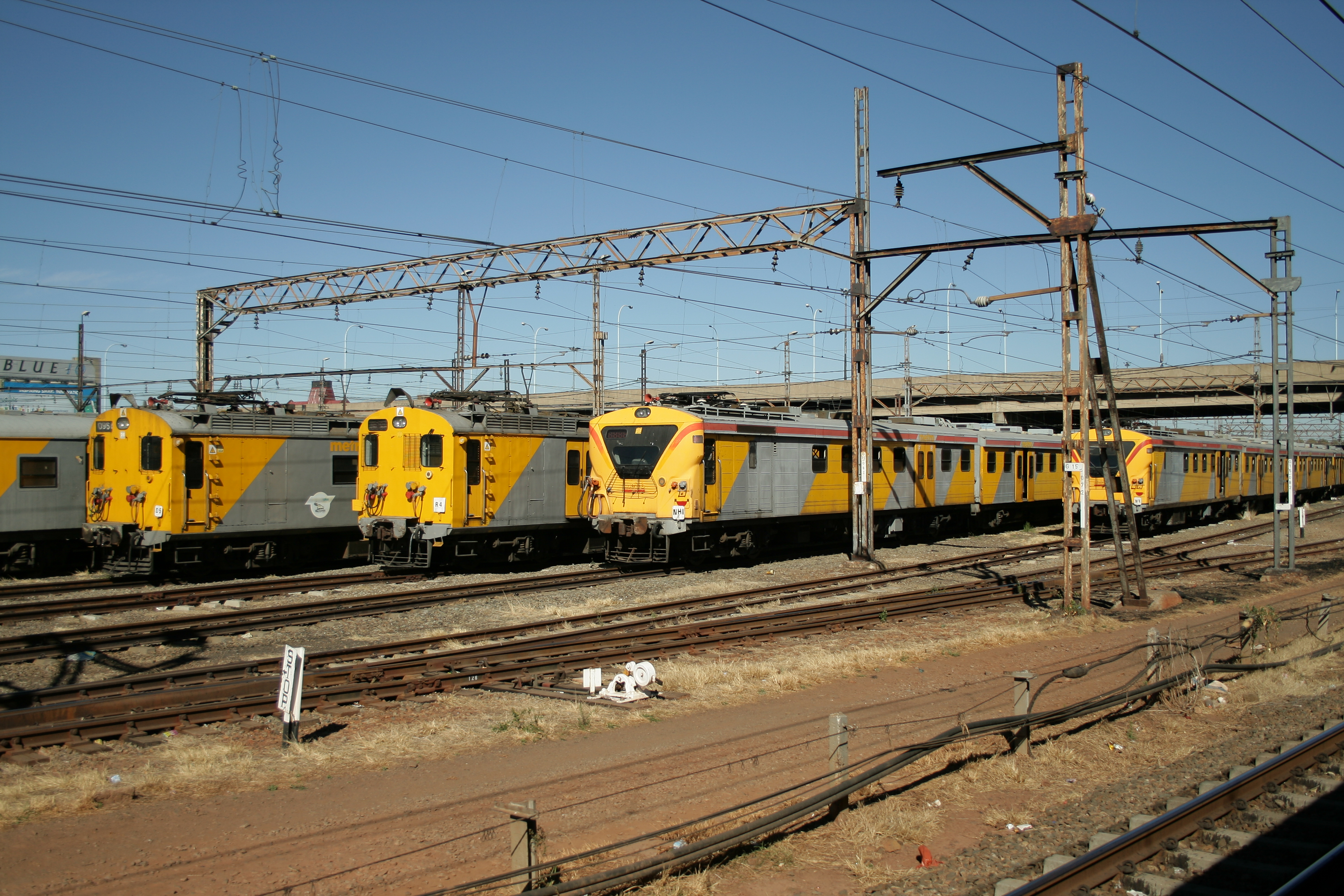
Johannesburg's heavy-rail system

Johannesburg's Metro-rail system is run by the PRASA. However, due to years of under-investment, it has fallen into disrepair, with most of the fleet being over 50 years old. Multiple concerns have been raised about its safety and PRASA, along with the government, has acknowledged these issues. There has been R172 billion (approximately $9.3 billion) put towards the modernization of the entire system including the fleet. Over the next 25 years, this plan will be implemented with 60% of the units manufactured locally. However, the routes only cover the southern area of Johannesburg.

== Suburban Rail ==
New Metrorail fleet

Gautrain route. The striped section is underground.

Johannesburg does not have a light rail system, but it has a commuter rail system known as the Gautrain. The Gautrain was built in 2010 to provide a reliable and efficient rail to the northern suburbs that do not have a heavy rail or a metro system, and to alleviate traffic on the N1 (Ben Schoeman Highway) between Johannesburg and Pretoria. The N1 Ben Schoeman highway is said to be the busiest highway in the Southern Hemisphere. Completed in 2012, the Gautrain has grown to become a huge success, transporting so many people a day, that it had to expand its fleet to keep the wait times manageable. Some believe that the R24 billion (the equivalent of $1.7 billion) could have been spent on other more essential projects, such as housing, water, etc.

A 149 km-long expansion project is currently underway, including 19 stations on 3 new lines. However, the extension project is currently on hold due to the impact that the COVID-19 pandemic and various lockdowns have had on passenger demand for the Gautrain and is only likely to commence in 2024. The Gautrain works on a smartcard system, where the passenger taps in at the starting station and taps out at the station of their destination. The system also runs a feeder bus system that uses the same smartcard system as the trains with your average trip costing about $0.65. However, the routes only cover a 5–8 km radius neglecting many areas, most notably the areas around Rosebank.

=== Gautrain Routes ===
(as of March 2016)

==== North-south line ====
Hatfield – Pretoria – Centurion – Midrand – Sandton – Marlboro – Rosebank – Johannesburg Park Station

==== East-west line ====
Sandton – Marlboro – Rhodesfield – O. R. Tambo International Airport

== Buses ==
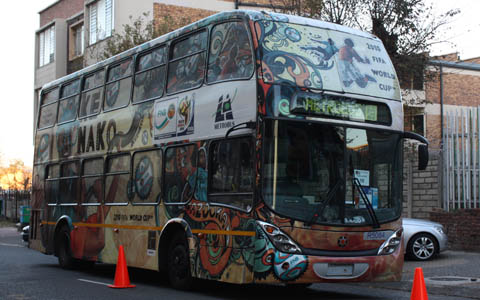
Decorated bus in Johannesburg, 2010

=== Metrobus ===
Metrobus is Johannesburg's primary and largest bus service operating an extensive number of routes covering most of the Metropolitan Municipality with many focusing on schools.

==== Payment system ====
The fees are determined according to a zonal system with the fee increasing with every zone crossed. and are ranged from R7/$0.5 a maximum of R40/$3.5 (e.g. park station to Midrand, 8 zones crossed, a total of 30 km) Fees are paid with cash/hard money or a pre-loaded card (cheaper than cash) similar to a subway system, with discounts to scholars and pensioners.

==== Fleet condition ====
The fleet is in a generally good condition with new buses that have been purchased and are steadily phasing out the old ones. A new eco-friendly fleet has recently been purchased, with some of the features including tinted windows that are said to save fuel on air conditioning and eco-friendly fuel, along with comfortable plush seats. A fleet which was purchased even more recently is co-branded with the Rea Vaya showing the city's efforts to integrate public transport.

=== Bus Rapid Transit ===
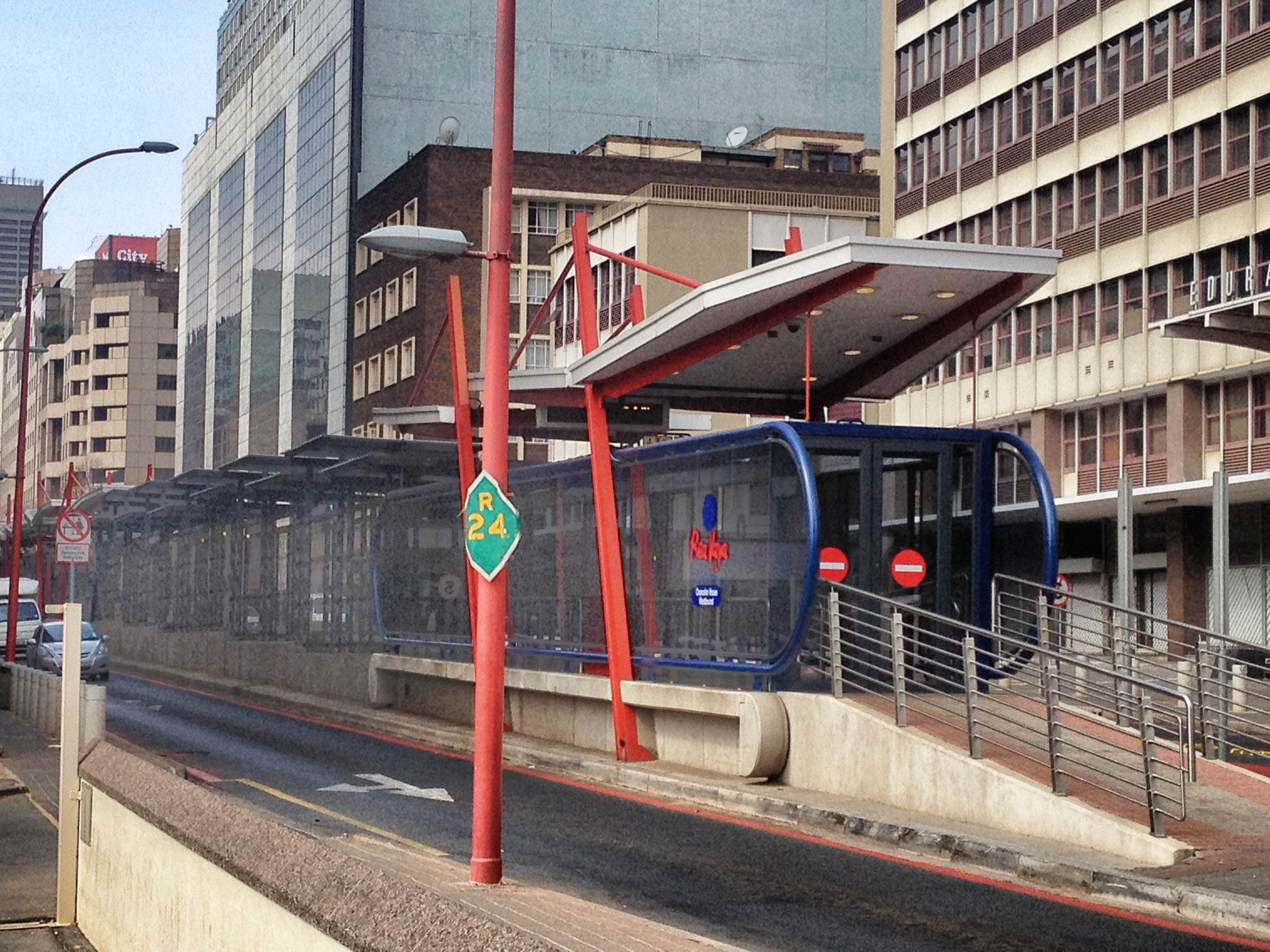
Rea Vaya station

Johannesburg is known in South Africa and Africa for having bumper-to-bumper traffic. Taking this into consideration, the city designed an affordable way to build an efficient system in 2010 to get people that are far away to the city center. This was done to avoid the notorious taxi industry, and the best option was a BRTS, the first in Africa, named the Rea Vaya which means "we are going". The project aims to make the entire city accessible to at least 80% of residents. At the time of writing the system is safe, cheap, and effective. The trunk and complementary routes run on their own lanes avoiding the infamous Joburg traffic jams and the feeder routes run on roads like normal buses.

==== Fee/payment system ====
The system works on a smartcard system with the passenger "taping in" (touching the smartcard onto the reader at the station or bus, depending on the route, Feeder routes have no stations. Instead they have buses and trunk and complementary routes have large stations) and taping out at the destination station/bus stop. The fee is determined according to distance traveled, approximately R5/$0.4 per kilometer. This is a cheap and affordable option competing with the minibus taxi industry.

==== Safety and effectiveness ====
The system is safe and clean, with CCTV cameras at all stations along with security guards, this not only keeps the stations and system safe but also the area around it. The system provides a safe and efficient transport option to those who do not want to use minibus taxis. The system also integrates the minibus taxi industry with many stations being nearby taxi ranks declared by the city of Johannesburg (where all the minibus taxis collect and where routes start).

==== Routes ====
(as of March 2018)

===== Trunk Route =====
Runs from Soweto to central Johannesburg. By the end of 2017, the route will run to Sandton and Rosebank in the north and by 2022 it will run to Midrand as well a huge distance of 150 km. The route to Sandton is largely complete, though is not yet operational.

== See also ==
- Rea Vaya
- Gautrain
- Johannesburg freeways
