= Volvo B7R =

Rear-engined single-deck coach chassis

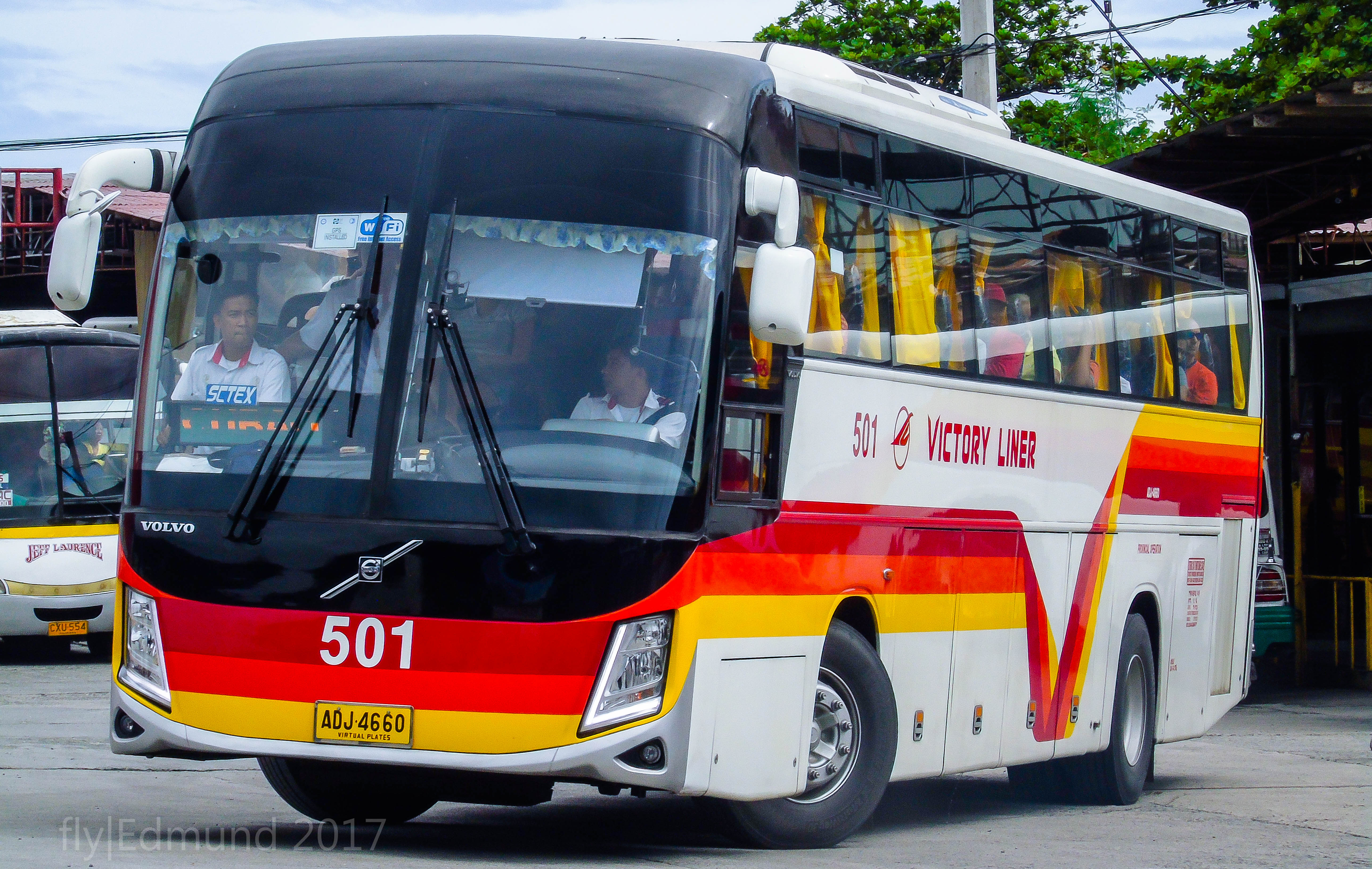
- Victory Liner B7R Bus operating in the Philippines

Overview
- Manufacturer: Volvo
- Production: 1997–2019
- Assembly: Sweden: Borås (CBU); Brazil: Curitiba (CBU); Philippines: Subic, Zambales and Muntinlupa (CKD)

Body and chassis
- Class: Single-deck coach chassis
- Doors: 1 or 2 in most markets; 3 in Malaysia including the driver's door; 4 in Indonesia including the driver's door and an emergency exit
- Floor type: Step entrance
- Related: Volvo B7RLE; Volvo B7L

Powertrain
- Engine: Volvo D7A/D7B/D7C/D7E
- Power output: 230 hp (170 kW) (D7A); 260 hp (190 kW) (D7B); 290 hp (220 kW) (D7E)
- Transmission: Voith DIWA D863.3 3-speed automatic; Volvo G8-EGS/MGS 8-speed manual; ZF 4HP500 4-speed automatic; ZF S6-85 6-speed manual; ZF 6AP 1400B 6-speed automatic

Dimensions
- Length: 10.5–12.5 m (34–41 ft)
- Width: 2.5 m (8 ft 2 in)
- Curb weight: 18,000 kilograms (40,000 lb)

Chronology
- Predecessor: Volvo B10M; Volvo B58
- Successor: Volvo B8R

The Volvo B7R is a rear-engined lightweight coach chassis available with a range of bodies. Marketed mainly for tourist and long-distance duties, the B7R is also manufactured in China, Brazil, Hungary, India and Iran for use in regional transport services.

== Design ==
Launched in South Africa in early 1997, the Volvo B7R was marketed as a cheaper alternative to the versatile but elderly mid-engined Volvo B10M and aimed at 'niche' sectors in worldwide operating markets, such as intercity coach services. The B7R could be offered with Volvo's D7 six-cylinder Euro II diesel engine range, derived from the TD70 engine used in the Volvo Ailsa B55 double-decker bus, commonly equipped with a turbocharger and intercooler; at launch, the D7B variant of the engine produced a power output of 260 horsepower (190 kW) with 1,100 newton-metres (810 lbf⋅ft) of torque, while the D7E variant produced a power output of 290 horsepower (220 kW) with 1,200 newton-metres (890 lbf⋅ft) of torque.

A range of Voith DIWA, Volvo or ZF manual synchromesh or automatic transmissions, incorporated with torque converters and Telma retarders and either parabolic leaf springs or air suspension, could be specified depending on operating market; for the United Kingdom coaching market, B7Rs were equipped with an air-sprung chassis mated with a ZF manual or automatic gearbox, fitted with Telma retarders, as standard.

Volvo B7Rs were built with a steel frame and typically offered at a length of between 12.0 metres (39.4 ft) to 12.5 metres (41 ft), though at launch, they could be offered in 'transit chassis' form, cut down to 10.5–11.0 metres (34.4–36.1 ft) with shorter rear overhangs for bodying by local manufacturers. Additionally, the B7R was also available as an integral product: integral B7Rs included the Volvo 7350 for Mexican operators, the Volvo 9400 for Indian operators, and Volvo 8700. Volvo also developed a low-floor variant of B7R, known as the Volvo B7RLE, for intercity and city operations.

== Operators ==
=== Africa ===
==== South Africa ====
South Africa's first Volvo B7R was launched at the Volvo global launch event for the B7R in 1997, featuring a coach body built by local Volvo importer Swedish Truck Distributors.

Metrobus of Johannesburg took delivery of 50 Marcopolo Viale bodied B7Rs in 2002, alongside an order for 150 Volvo B7TL double decker buses with Marcopolo bodies. These were the first low-floor buses to enter service in South Africa as part of a major company modernisation scheme. Golden Arrow Bus Services of Cape Town additionally took delivery of 35 Marcopolo bodied Volvo B7Rs in 2010.

=== Asia ===
==== India ====
After a six-month demonstration period using two intercity-specification B7Rs loaned from Hong Kong and Singapore, the Volvo B7R was launched in 2001 for India's intercity and tourist bus market. The B7R soon became the most popular 'deluxe' long-distance air-conditioned bus in India, with the chassis being locally manufactured at Volvo's Hoskote plant in Karnataka.

A fleet of Volvo B7R intercity coaches were delivered to Raj Travels of Mumbai and Neeta Travels of Pune in 2002 for use on a route travelling via the Mumbai–Pune Expressway. Over 100 B7Rs coaches were later delivered to Raj Travels between 2005 and 2006, India's largest order for Volvo buses at the time.

==== Indonesia ====
The Volvo B7R was only offered to Indonesian bus and coach operators from 2003 to 2004, however operators who purchased the B7R included PO. Harapan Jaya and PO. Nusantara, among others, for dual-purpose use as either a regular service or tourist shuttle bus. Due to the high power output from the B7R's D7E engine, many of Indonesia's Volvo B7R operators either sold the bus or replaced the D7E engine with Fuso 6D16, Nissan FE6B or Hino J08E diesel engines in order to reduce running costs.

==== Philippines ====
In the Philippines, the B7R launched in 2016 with bus bodies from Autodelta Coach Builders and Del Monte Motor Works, both of them had a Volvo 9800-styled front fascia.

==== Singapore ====
The Volvo B7R has a high-floor configuration and two doors raised platform. these small batch buses was running on Sentosa and supplied by Liannex Corporation bodywork. they were fitted with a 5-speed ZF Ecomat 5HP 502C automatic transmission with coupling to engine components and powered by Volvo D7C-290 Euro 3 compliant engine. These B7R Liannex buses were retired and scrapped by 2020.

=== Europe ===
==== United Kingdom and Ireland ====
Volvo B7Rs in the United Kingdom were first launched with Plaxton Prima bodywork in late 1997, marketed as a cheaper alternative to the Plaxton Premiere on Volvo B10M body and chassis combination. The first operator to take delivery of a B7R in the United Kingdom was James Bevan Coaches of Lydney, Gloucestershire in early 1998.

=== South America ===
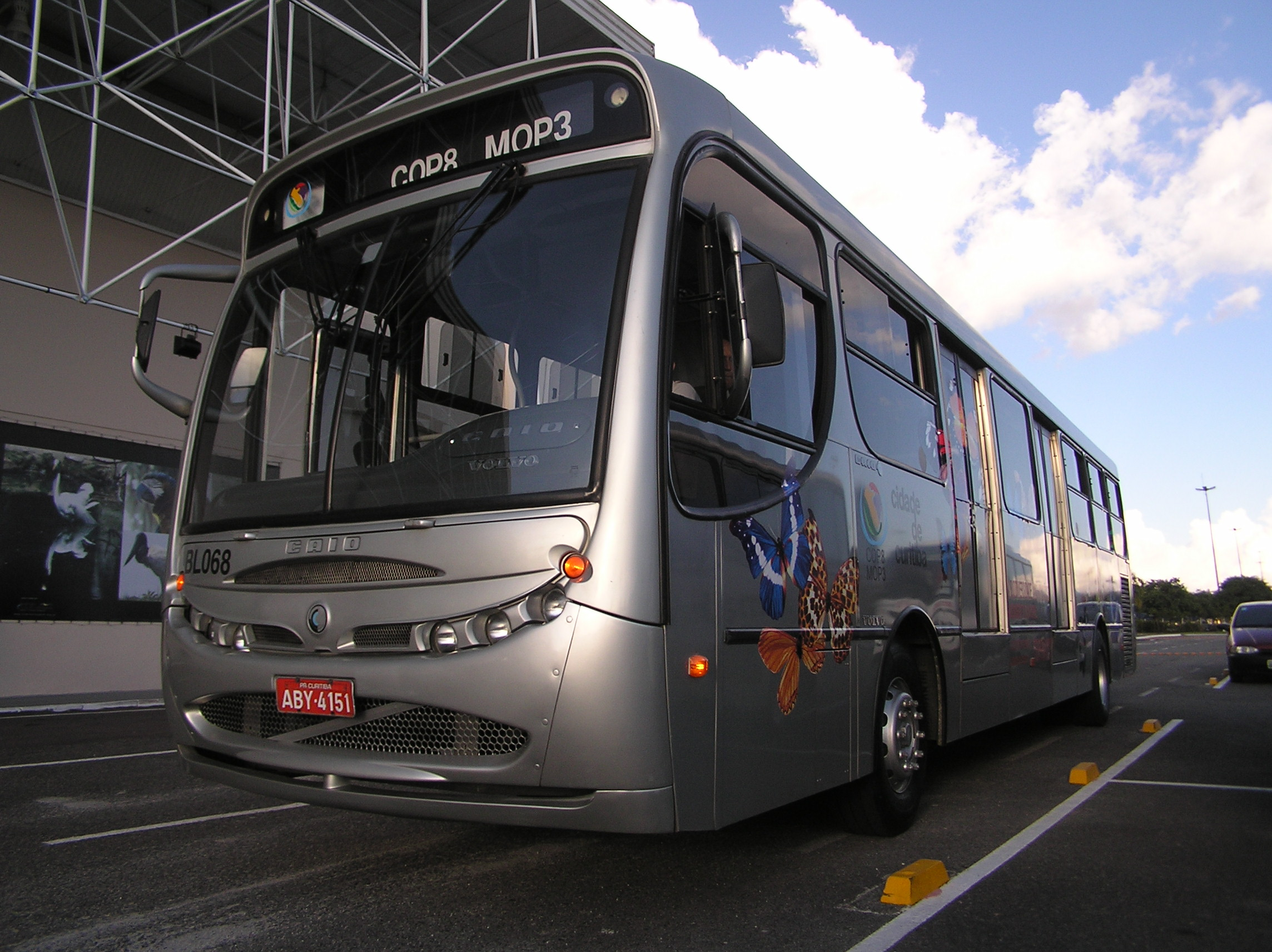
CAIO Induscar Apache VIP bodied Volvo B7R in Curitiba

In Brazil, the B7R is produced in Curitiba, since 1998. The first B7R in the country was imported from Sweden and operated in Curitiba's public transportation as a Direct Line Bus. In 2012, Volvo renamed the Brazilian market's B7R to the Volvo B290R, commonly employed in Brazilian bus rapid transit services.

==== Uruguay ====
Uruguay's first Volvo B7Rs entered service in the capital Montevideo in 2001, with UCOT, one of three major bus operators in the city, taking delivery of 48 with Busscar Urbanuss Plus bodies; UCOT took delivery of nine further B7Rs in 2007 with Comil Campione Vision 3.25 bodies for suburban and interurban use.

In 2004, transport co-operative COETC took delivery of fifteen Marcopolo Grand Viale bodied B7Rs between 2004 and 2005. Ten B7Rs with Marcopolo Torino VIP Class bodies were delivered to COETC in 2008 following the company's merger with Las Piedras co-operative CODET, with a further 70 delivered in 2010 with Marcopolo Gran Via II bodies. RAINCOOP additionally took delivery of eight B7Rs in 2007 with Marcopolo Allegro G6 bodies, as well as nine with CAIO Induscar bodies in 2008.

Elsewhere in Uruguay, Empresa Tala Pando Montevideo took delivery of 10 Volvo B7Rs with Busscar El Buss 340 bodywork, and further quantities being acquired by interdepartmental operators such as CITA SA, Grupo Carminatti and Cromin/"Rutas del Sol".

== Gallery ==
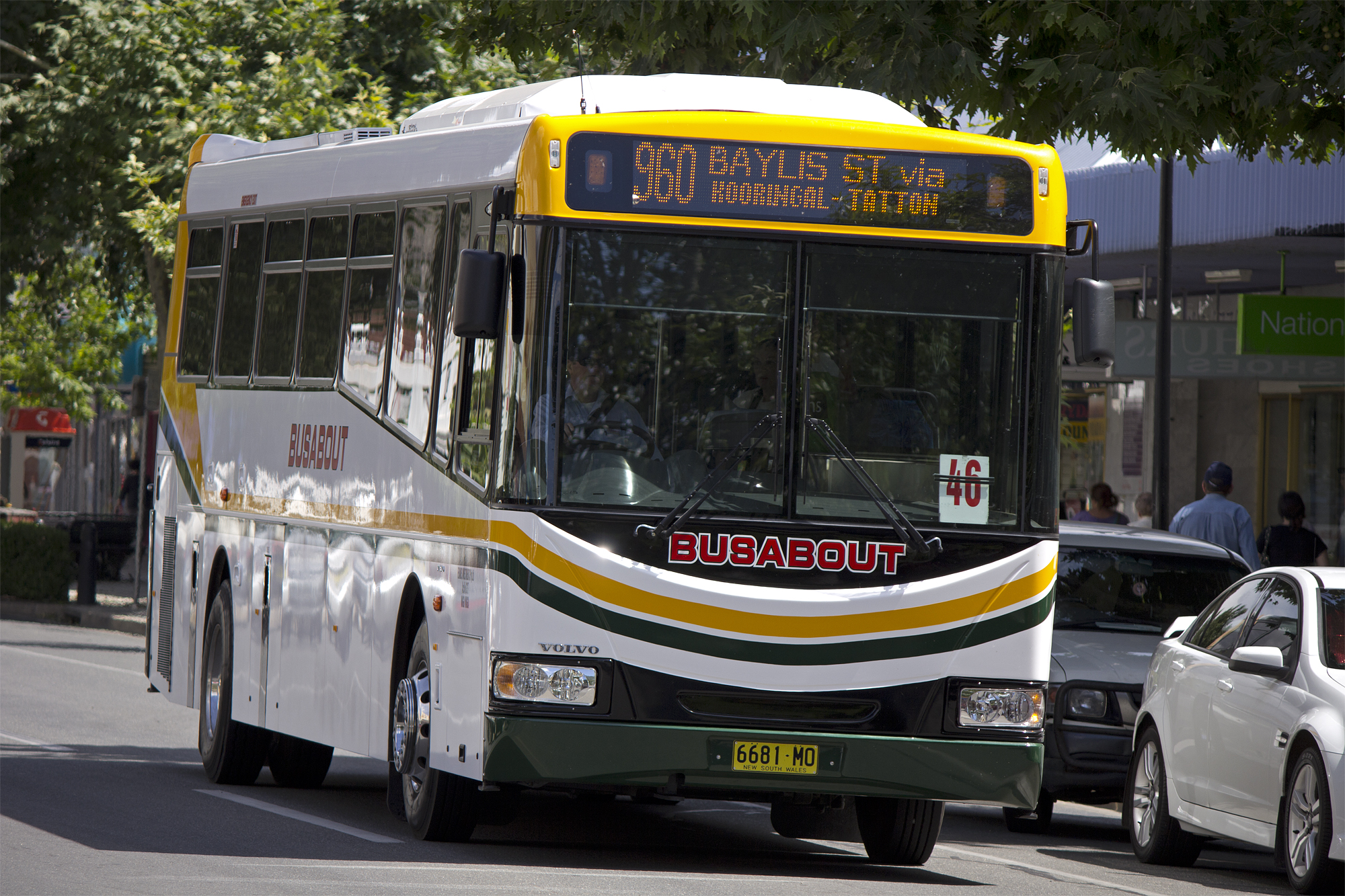
Bustech "SBV"-bodied Volvo B7R with Euro 5 specific engine, operated by Busabout Wagga Wagga

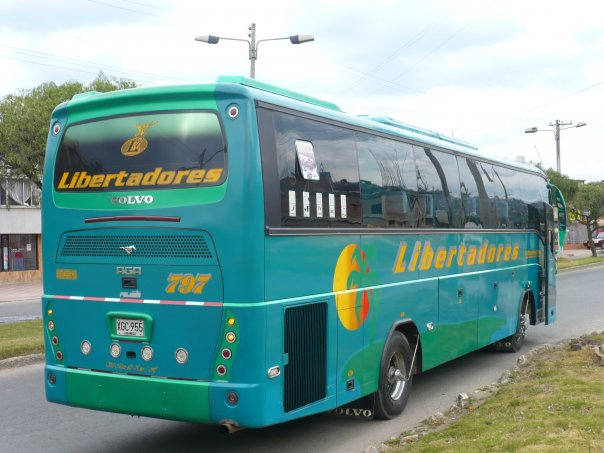
Coflonorte LTDA 'Libertadores' Volvo B7R with an AGA Polaris body in Colombia

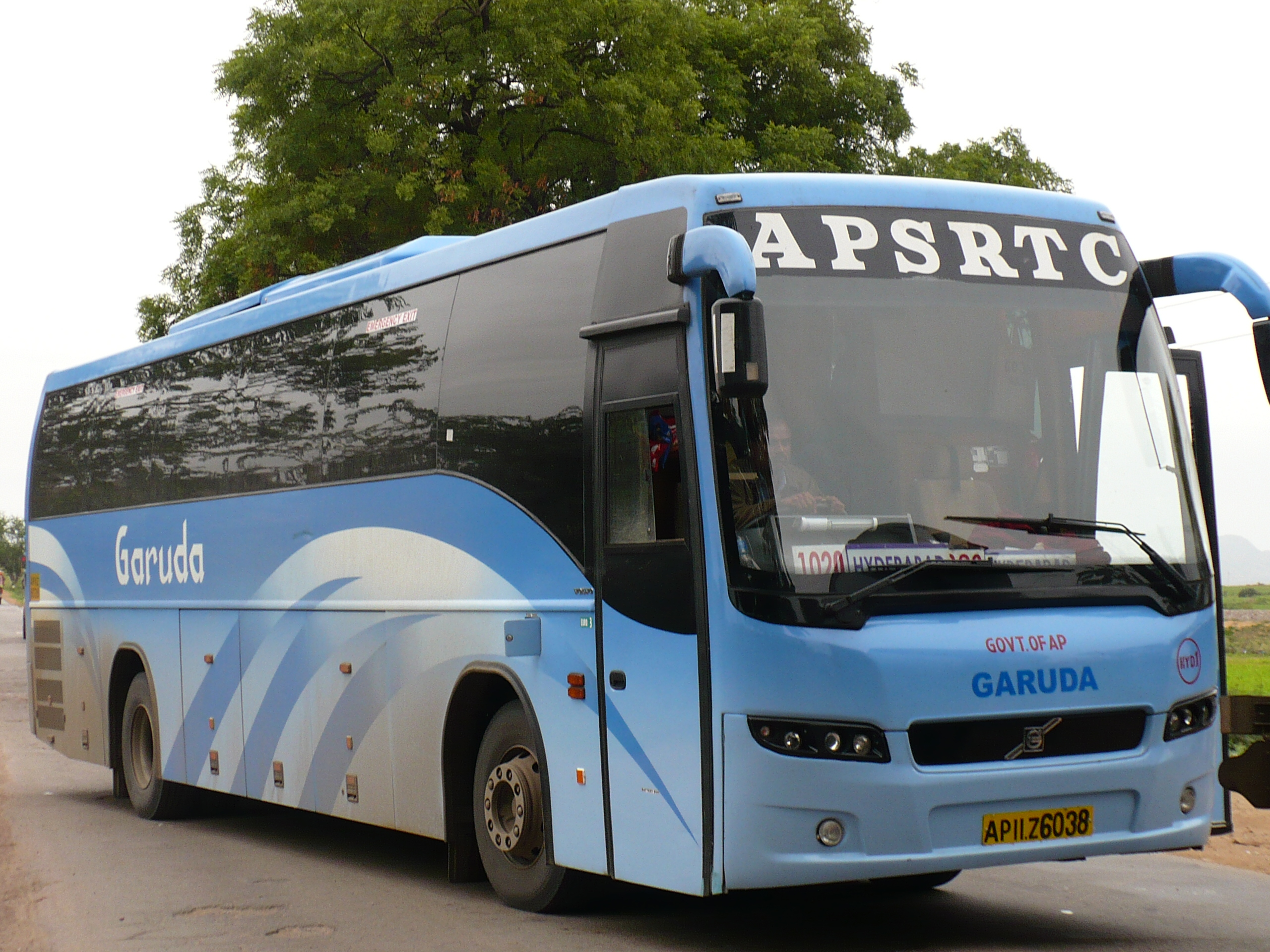
APSRTC Garuda Volvo B7R in Andhra Pradesh, India

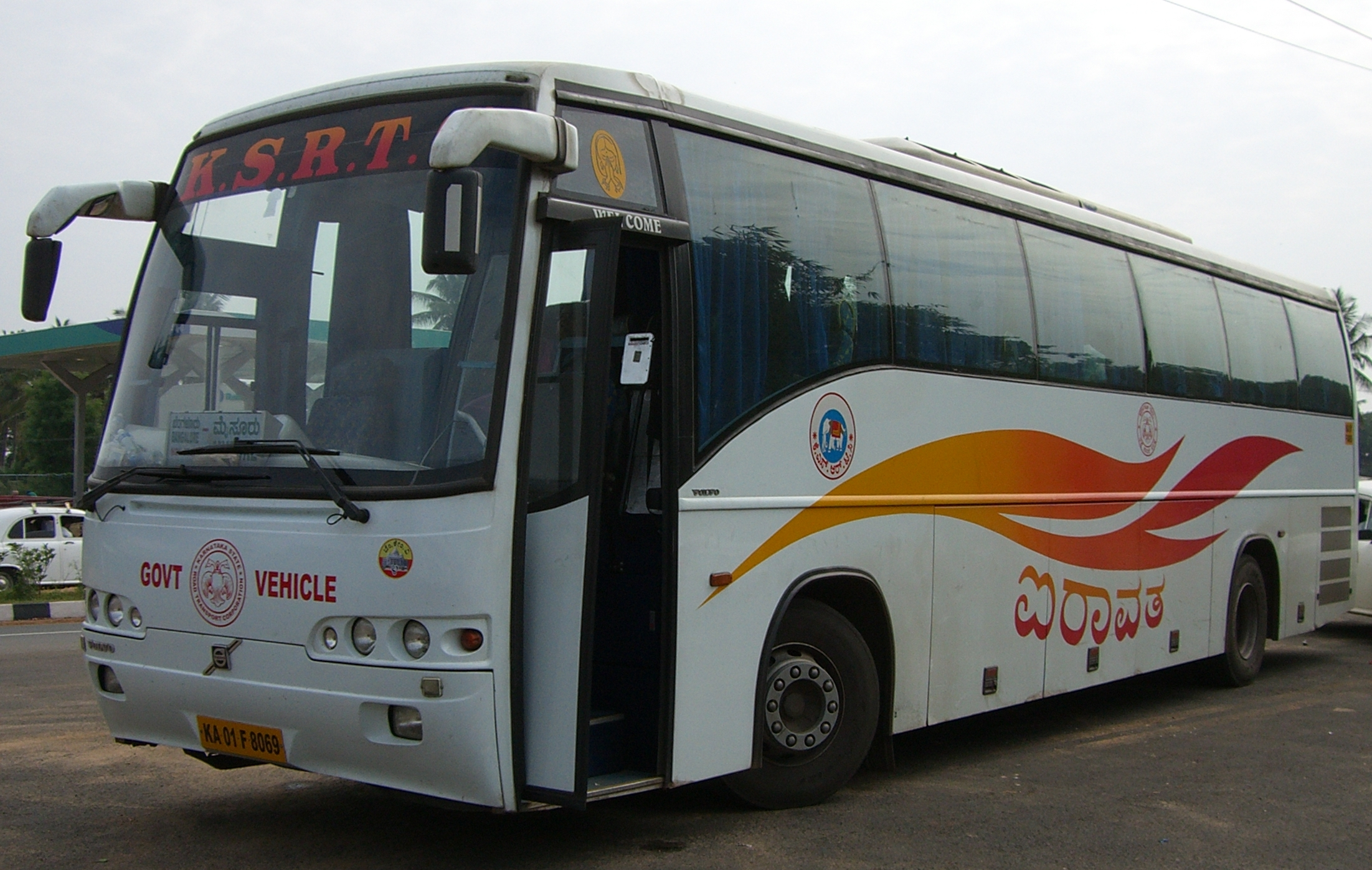
A Volvo B7R of the Karnataka State Road Transport Corporation

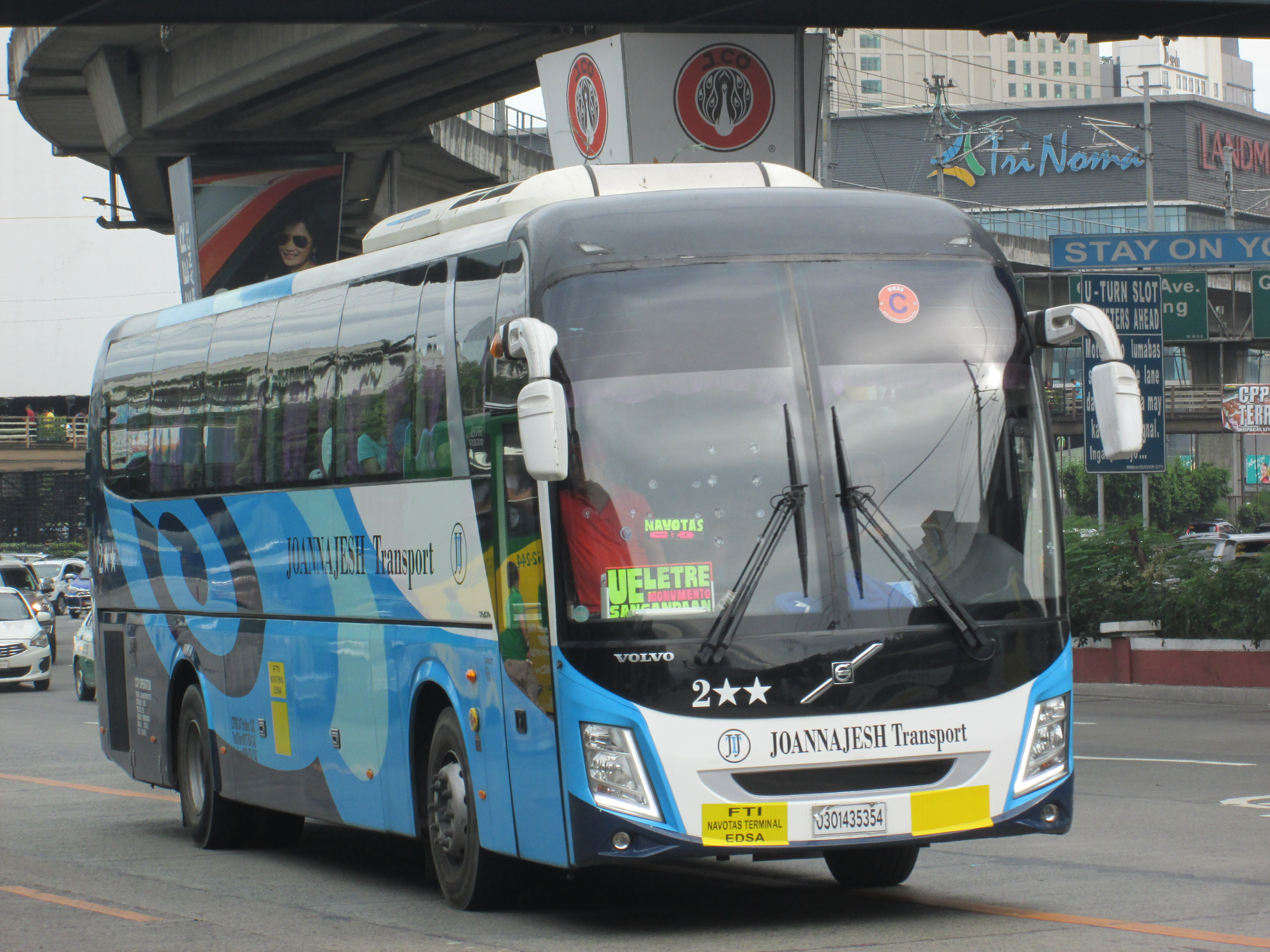
Volvo B7R operated by Joanna Jesh Transport Corporation in the Philippines

== See also ==
- List of buses
