= Barbeque Downs Agricultural Holdings =

- Location within Gauteng Location within South Africa
- Coordinates: 26°00′35″S 28°04′29″E
- Country: South Africa
- Province: Gauteng
- Municipality: City of Johannesburg
- Main Place: Midrand

Area
  - Total: 0.71 km^{2} (0.27 sq mi)

Population
  - Total: 1,559
  - Density: 2,200/km^{2} (5,700/sq mi)

Racial makeup (2011)
  - White: 46.6%
  - Black African: 25.9%
  - Indian/Asian: 21.2%
  - Coloured: 3.3%
  - Other: 3%

First languages (2011)
  - English: 68.9%
  - Afrikaans: 11.8%
  - Zulu: 5.7%
  - Xhosa: 2.6%
  - Other: 11%
- Time zone: UTC+2 (SAST)

Barbeque Downs Agricultural Holdings is a suburb of Midrand, South Africa. It is located in Region A of the City of Johannesburg Metropolitan Municipality.
