= Willaway =

- Location within Gauteng Location within South Africa
- Coordinates: 25.996°S 28.083°E
- Country: South Africa
- Province: Gauteng
- Municipality: City of Johannesburg
- Main Place: Midrand

Area
  - Total: 0.37 km^{2} (0.14 sq mi)

Population (2011)
  - Total: 658
  - Density: 1,800/km^{2} (4,600/sq mi)

Racial makeup (2011)
  - Black African: 31.0%
  - Coloured: 2.4%
  - Indian/Asian: 13.4%
  - White: 52.9%
  - Other: 0.3%

First languages (2011)
  - English: 73.6%
  - Afrikaans: 9.4%
  - Zulu: 4.7%
  - Xhosa: 2.3%
  - Other: 10.0%
- Time zone: UTC+2 (SAST)

Willaway is a suburb of Midrand, South Africa. It is located in Region A of the City of Johannesburg Metropolitan Municipality.
