= Plooysville =

- Location within Gauteng Location within South Africa
- Coordinates: 26.011°S 28.079°E
- Country: South Africa
- Province: Gauteng
- Municipality: City of Johannesburg
- Main Place: Midrand

Area
  - Total: 0.17 km^{2} (0.066 sq mi)

Population (2011)
  - Total: 328
  - Density: 1,900/km^{2} (5,000/sq mi)

Racial makeup (2011)
  - Black African: 17.7%
  - Coloured: 3.0%
  - Indian/Asian: 19.8%
  - White: 58.8%
  - Other: 0.6%

First languages (2011)
  - English: 75.0%
  - Afrikaans: 10.7%
  - Zulu: 3.4%
  - Xhosa: 2.7%
  - Other: 8.2%
- Time zone: UTC+2 (SAST)

Plooysville is a suburb of Midrand, South Africa. It is located in Region A of the City of Johannesburg Metropolitan Municipality.
