= POLAF =

Political Africa Initiative
- Formation: 2012
- Type: NGO
- Legal status: Organisation
- Purpose: promote and advance elective political leadership for Africa’s younger generation
- Headquarters: Midrand, Johannesburg, South Africa
- Location: South Africa
- Region served: South Africa, Nigeria, Ghana and Kenya
- Website: www.polaf.org

POLAF (Political Africa Initiative) is a not-for-profit, non-governmental organisation, initiated to promote and advance elective political leadership for Africa's younger generation. Its stated aim is to "engage, educate and alert teens and young adults alike to the importance and urgency of seeking elective political offices in their respective countries. We want young people to get involved in the political process, for it is only by taking power politically that we can effect meaningful change and liberate Africa."

POLAF was founded in 2012 and has its head office in Midrand, Johannesburg, South Africa. It also has presence in Nigeria, Ghana and Kenya. POLAF focuses on young highly educated Africans in Africa and the African diaspora. POLAF delegation have attended, participated and spoken in conferences and summits organised by the United Nations, Africa 2.0, Africa Leadership Network, King's College London, and others, in Nairobi, London, Accra, New York, San Francisco, Geneva, Lagos, Abuja, and Johannesburg.
