= Woodmead =

- Location within Gauteng Location within South Africa
- Coordinates: 26.046°S 28.066°E
- Country: South Africa
- Province: Gauteng
- Municipality: City of Johannesburg
- Main Place: Sandton

Area
  - Total: 6.50 km^{2} (2.51 sq mi)

Population (2011)
  - Total: 4,225
  - Density: 650/km^{2} (1,680/sq mi)

Racial makeup (2011)
  - Black African: 28.3%
  - Coloured: 1.7%
  - Indian/Asian: 7.8%
  - White: 60.5%
  - Other: 1.7%

First languages (2011)
  - English: 69.3%
  - Afrikaans: 7.6%
  - Zulu: 5.6%
  - Northern Sotho: 2.7%
  - Other: 14.7%
- Time zone: UTC+2 (SAST)
- Postal code (street): 2191

Woodmead is mostly a commercial suburb in the northern part of Johannesburg, Gauteng, South Africa. Four highways meet here, the N1 Western Bypass, N1 Ben Schoeman Freeway, N3 Eastern Bypass, and the M1. The southern terminus of the R55 road is also located here. Access is off the Woodmead offramp to the M1. Several large business are located in Woodmead, including 3M, Ericsson, Accenture, Aspen Pharmacare and SAP.

The 94.7 Cycle Challenge starts at the intersection of Woodmead Drive and Van Reenen in Woodmead. This is a 94.7 kilometre cycle race that is held every year and is sponsored by 94.7 Highveld Stereo, a popular regional radio station. Woodmead is also the site of two large 18-hole golf courses, which opened in 1968. Both courses are known as the Johannesburg Country Club and have previously hosted the South African Open and Johannesburg Open golf events.
