= Midridge Park =

- Location within Gauteng Location within South Africa
- Coordinates: 25.975°S 28.122°E
- Country: South Africa
- Province: Gauteng
- Municipality: City of Johannesburg
- Main Place: Midrand

Area
  - Total: 0.62 km^{2} (0.24 sq mi)

Population (2011)
  - Total: 385
  - Density: 620/km^{2} (1,600/sq mi)

Racial makeup (2011)
  - Black African: 66.5%
  - Coloured: 3.6%
  - Indian/Asian: 26.2%
  - White: 2.1%
  - Other: 1.6%

First languages (2011)
  - English: 49.9%
  - Zulu: 12.2%
  - Xhosa: 6.8%
  - Northern Sotho: 6.8%
  - Other: 24.4%
- Time zone: UTC+2 (SAST)

Midridge Park is a suburb of Johannesburg, South Africa. It is located in Region A of the City of Johannesburg Metropolitan Municipality.
