= Erand =

- Location within Gauteng Location within South Africa
- Coordinates: 25.988°S 28.113°E
- Country: South Africa
- Province: Gauteng
- Municipality: City of Johannesburg
- Main Place: Midrand

Area
  - Total: 2.03 km^{2} (0.78 sq mi)

Population (2011)
  - Total: 4,728
  - Density: 2,330/km^{2} (6,030/sq mi)

Racial makeup (2011)
  - Black African: 76.8%
  - Coloured: 2.8%
  - Indian/Asian: 15.3%
  - White: 4.1%
  - Other: 0.9%

First languages (2011)
  - English: 28.9%
  - Zulu: 14.6%
  - Xhosa: 12.0%
  - Tswana: 10.0%
  - Other: 34.5%
- Time zone: UTC+2 (SAST)
- Area code: 010

Erand is a suburb of Midrand, South Africa. It is in located in Region A of the City of Johannesburg Metropolitan Municipality.

== History ==
Originally an agricultural holding near Halfway House, it was named after the owner Erasmus of the farm Randjiesfontein.
