= Kaalfontein =

- Location within Gauteng Location within South Africa
- Coordinates: 26°2′7″S 28°15′16″E
- Country: South Africa
- Province: Gauteng
- Municipality: City of Johannesburg

Area
  - Total: 4.96 km^{2} (1.92 sq mi)

Population (2011)
  - Total: 46,147
  - Density: 9,300/km^{2} (24,100/sq mi)

Racial makeup (2011)
  - Black African: 97.6%
  - Coloured: 0.7%
  - Indian/Asian: 0.1%
  - White: 0.1%
  - Other: 1.5%

First languages (2011)
  - Northern Sotho: 30.5%
  - Zulu: 21.2%
  - Tsonga: 10.4%
  - Xhosa: 8.2%
  - Other: 29.6%
- Time zone: UTC+2 (SAST)
- Postal code (street): 1685
- PO box: 2498

Kaalfontein is a township east of Midrand, South Africa. It is located in Region A of the City of Johannesburg Metropolitan Municipality. It is usually treated as one suburb with Ebony Park.
