= Kyalami Agricultural Holdings =

- Location within Gauteng Location within South Africa
- Coordinates: 25.9700°S 28.0500°E
- Country: South Africa
- Province: Gauteng
- Municipality: City of Johannesburg
- Main Place: Midrand

Area
  - Total: 18.07 km^{2} (6.98 sq mi)

Population (2011)
  - Total: 3,299
  - Density: 182.6/km^{2} (472.8/sq mi)

Racial makeup (2011)
  - Black African: 39.6%
  - Coloured: 0.6%
  - Indian/Asian: 1.0%
  - White: 57.6%
  - Other: 1.2%

First languages (2011)
  - English: 58.8%
  - Zulu: 11.0%
  - Afrikaans: 8.2%
  - Southern Ndebele: 3.6%
  - Other: 18.4%
- Time zone: UTC+2 (SAST)

Kyalami Agricultural Holdings is a suburb of Midrand, South Africa. It is located in Region A of the City of Johannesburg Metropolitan Municipality.
