= Barbeque Downs =

- Location within Gauteng Location within South Africa
- Coordinates: 26°0′11″S 28°4′31″E
- Country: South Africa
- Province: Gauteng
- Municipality: City of Johannesburg
- Main Place: Midrand

Area
  - Total: 0.73 km^{2} (0.28 sq mi)

Population (2011)
  - Total: 27
  - Density: 37/km^{2} (96/sq mi)

Racial makeup (2011)
  - Black African: 18.5%
  - White: 81.5%

First languages (2011)
  - English: 81.5%
  - Zulu: 11.1%
  - Afrikaans: 3.7%
  - Tswana: 3.7%
- Time zone: UTC+2 (SAST)
- PO box: 1684

Barbeque Downs is a suburb of Midrand, South Africa. It is located in Region A of the City of Johannesburg Metropolitan Municipality.
