= M24 (Pretoria) =

Road in Pretoria, South Africa

Metropolitan route M24

Route information
- Maintained by City of Tshwane Metropolitan Municipality
- Length: 9 km (5.6 mi)

Major junctions
- West end: R55 near Claudius
- R101 in Valhalla; N14 near Kloofsig
- East end: M10 in Lyttelton Manor

Location
- Country: South Africa

Highway system
- Numbered routes of South Africa
← M23	→ M25

The M24 road is a metropolitan route in the City of Tshwane in Gauteng, South Africa. It is in the city of Centurion, connecting Valhalla with Lyttelton.

== Route ==
The M24 route begins at a junction with the R55 route (Quagga Road) just south of Claudius and north of Sunderland Ridge. It begins by heading north-east as Stephanus Schoeman Road before turning to the east as Alaric Road to pass in-between the suburbs of Thaba Tshwane to the north and Valhalla to the south. It reaches a junction with Paul Kruger Road at the South African Air Force College and becomes Paul Kruger Road eastwards to cross the R101 route (Old Johannesburg Road). It turns to the south-east, bypassing the Air Force Base Swartkop, to fly over the N14 highway (Ben Schoeman Highway) as Snake Valley Road and reach its end at a junction with the M10 route (Wierda Road; Trichard Road) just west of Kloofsig (north of Lyttelton Manor).
