= Olievenhoutbosch =

Olievenhoutbosch Olieven
- Location within Gauteng Location within South Africa
- Coordinates: 25°54′34″S 28°5′34″E
- Country: South Africa
- Province: Gauteng
- Municipality: City of Tshwane
- Main Place: Centurion
- Founder: Chief Andries Zonke Choba

Government
  - Councillor: Mogauwane Kenneth Masha

Area
  - Total: 11.39 km^{2} (4.40 sq mi)

Population (2011)
  - Total: 70,863
  - Density: 6,222/km^{2} (16,110/sq mi)

Racial makeup (2011)
  - Black African: 98.0%
  - Coloured: 0.6%
  - Indian/Asian: 0.2%
  - White: 0.1%
  - Other: 1.2%

First languages (2011)
  - Northern Sotho: 32.6%
  - Zulu: 14.2%
  - S. Ndebele: 8.0%
  - Xhosa: 7.1%
  - Other: 38.1%
- Time zone: UTC+2 (SAST)
- Postal code (street): 0187
- PO box: 0175
- Website: www.olievenhoutbosch.co.za

Olievenhoutbosch (also known as 'Olieven"/ 'Stop12") is a township in Centurion, Gauteng, South Africa on the R55 route. It was established in the 1990s. It is densely populated and is one of the fastest-growing townships in the province.
