= Heuweloord =

- Location within Gauteng Location within South Africa
- Coordinates: 25°53′S 28°6′E
- Country: South Africa
- Province: Gauteng
- Municipality: City of Tshwane
- Main Place: Centurion

Area
  - Total: 2.00 km^{2} (0.77 sq mi)

Population (2011)
  - Total: 3,861
  - Density: 1,930/km^{2} (5,000/sq mi)

Racial makeup (2011)
  - Black African: 36.9%
  - Coloured: 5.6%
  - Indian/Asian: 32.0%
  - White: 24.6%
  - Other: 0.9%

First languages (2011)
  - English: 44.3%
  - Afrikaans: 21.3%
  - Northern Sotho: 7.0%
  - Tswana: 5.7%
  - Other: 21.8%
- Time zone: UTC+2 (SAST)
- Postal code (street): 0157
- PO box: 0173

Heuweloord is a suburb in Centurion, South Africa. The suburb is at the intersection of the R55 route and the R114 route.
