= Mall of Africa =

Shopping mall in Midrand, South Africa

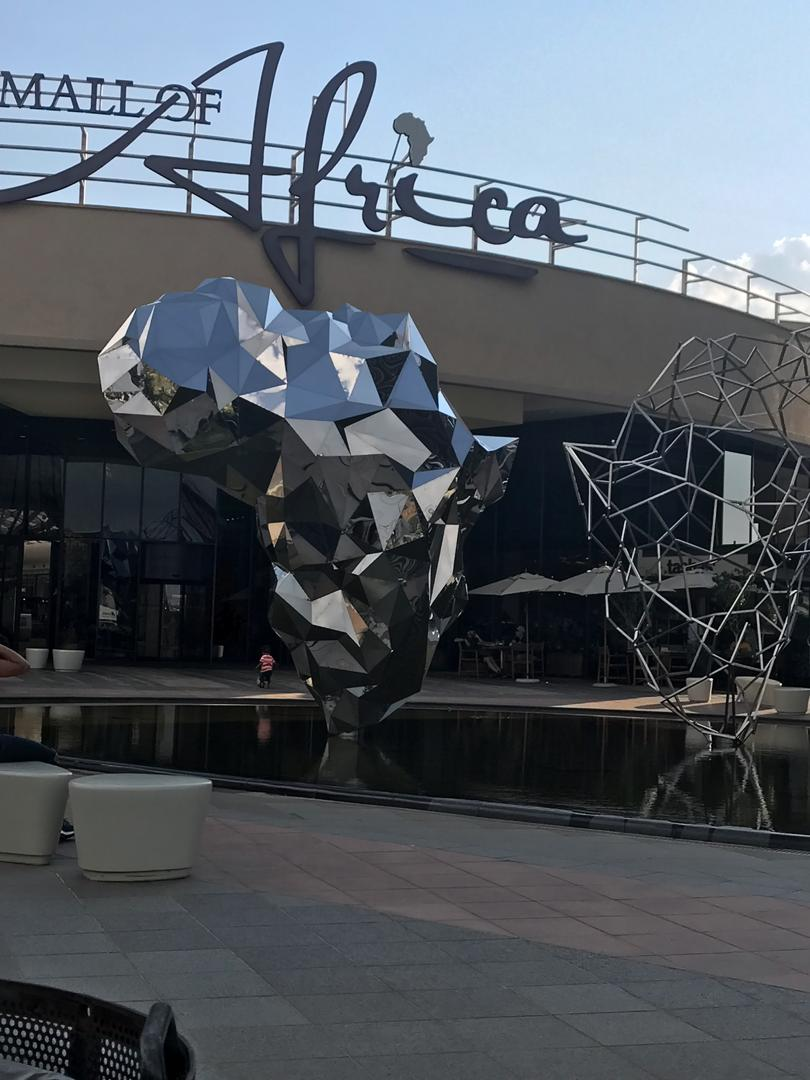
- Interactive map of the Mall of Africa area
- Alternative names: MoA

General information
- Status: Completed
- Type: Shopping Mall
- Architectural style: Africa's geology
- Location: Midrand, Gauteng, South Africa
- Coordinates: 26°00′53.3″S 28°06′23.5″E
- Construction started: 28 October 2012; 13 years ago
- Opened: 28 April 2016; 9 years ago
- Cost: R3.5 Billion
- Owner: Attacq Ltd

Technical details
- Lifts/elevators: 50

Other information
- Parking: 6,000 bays

Website
- http://www.mallofafrica.co.za/

Mall of Africa is a shopping mall located in Waterfall City, Midrand, Gauteng. It is the third largest single-phase shopping mall to be built in Africa.

The mall has 130,000 square meters of total retail area. Mall of Africa has two main levels for retail, as well as an outdoor restaurant plaza that connects directly to the Waterfall City Park.

== History ==
Mall of Africa was incepted to be the centrepiece of Waterfall City, an upcoming mixed-use development located in Midrand, Gauteng. Located between Johannesburg and Pretoria the Mall and Waterfall is easily accessible to most of Gauteng. Construction began in 2012 and was originally planned to open in March 2016, but was later slated to April 2016.

=== Opening day events ===
The mall was opened to the public on 28 April 2016 and resulted in heavy traffic congestion along the N1 and N3 highways as well as most roads leading towards the Midrand area. Some stores had opening day sales that drew hundreds of shoppers into queues extending around the corners of the shops entrance, this led to some shoppers questioning if the shops were prepared for the opening.

== Tenants ==
Mall of Africa has anchor tenants including departmental store Woolworths and hypermarkets Game and Checkers Hyper. The shopping mall also has house flagship stores in South Africa for international brands such as H&M, Cotton On and Forever 21. As well as introducing new brands to South Africa like Starbucks, Mango Man, The Kooples, Boutique Adela, Zara Home, Armani Exchange, Under Armour and Interoptika.

== Design ==
The mall design was inspired by Africa's geological features, as evident by its courts. The Crystal Court is located in the Northern Section of the mall, representing Southern Africa's mineral wealth with sharp geometric patterns.

The Great Lakes Court is located in the Eastern Section of the mall, representing the Great Lakes mostly of East Africa and has calm and gentle materials used. The Desert Court is located in the Southern Section of the mall, representing the Sahara Desert of North Africa and has calm motifs used in traditional Berber carpets.

The Oleum Court is located in the Western Section of the mall, representing West Africa's Oil wealth. The Forest Walk Court is in the center of the shopping mall, representing Central Africa and its rain forests.
