= Halfway Gardens =

- Location within Gauteng Location within South Africa
- Coordinates: 25.993°S 28.110°E
- Country: South Africa
- Province: Gauteng
- Municipality: City of Johannesburg
- Main Place: Midrand

Area
  - Total: 3.07 km^{2} (1.19 sq mi)

Population (2011)
  - Total: 10,500
  - Density: 3,420/km^{2} (8,860/sq mi)

Racial makeup (2011)
  - Black African: 46.9%
  - Coloured: 4.2%
  - Indian/Asian: 29.7%
  - White: 18.3%
  - Other: 1.0%

First languages (2011)
  - English: 61.1%
  - Zulu: 8.6%
  - Afrikaans: 6.2%
  - Sotho: 4.9%
  - Other: 19.3%
- Time zone: UTC+2 (SAST)
- Postal code (street): 1686
- PO box: 1685

Halfway Gardens is a suburb of Midrand, South Africa. It is located in Region A of the City of Johannesburg Metropolitan Municipality.
