= Country View =

- Location within Gauteng Location within South Africa
- Coordinates: 25°56′42″S 28°07′37″E
- Country: South Africa
- Province: Gauteng
- Municipality: City of Johannesburg
- Main Place: Midrand

Area
  - Total: 0.93 km^{2} (0.36 sq mi)

Population (2011)
  - Total: 3,313
  - Density: 3,600/km^{2} (9,200/sq mi)

Racial makeup (2011)
  - Black African: 77.8%
  - Coloured: 3.0%
  - Indian/Asian: 15.1%
  - White: 3.3%
  - Other: 0.8%

First languages (2011)
  - English: 33.7%
  - Zulu: 14.6%
  - Tswana: 12.0%
  - Northern Sotho: 10.8%
  - Other: 28.9%
- Time zone: UTC+2 (SAST)
- Postal code (street): 1687
- PO box: 1687

Country View is a suburb of Midrand, South Africa. It is located in Region A of the City of Johannesburg Metropolitan Municipality.
