= Kyalami Estates =

- Location within Gauteng Location within South Africa
- Coordinates: 25.9900°S 28.0828°E
- Country: South Africa
- Province: Gauteng
- Municipality: City of Johannesburg
- Main Place: Midrand

Area
  - Total: 1.68 km^{2} (0.65 sq mi)

Population (2011)
  - Total: 4,196
  - Density: 2,500/km^{2} (6,470/sq mi)

Racial makeup (2011)
  - Black African: 26.5%
  - Coloured: 1.5%
  - Indian/Asian: 8.3%
  - White: 61.3%
  - Other: 2.4%

First languages (2011)
  - English: 70.1%
  - Afrikaans: 6.2%
  - Zulu: 4.3%
  - Sotho: 3.3%
  - Other: 16.1%
- Time zone: UTC+2 (SAST)
- Postal code (street): 1684
- PO box: 1684

Kyalami Estates is a gated residential suburb of Midrand, South Africa. It is located in Region A of the City of Johannesburg Metropolitan Municipality. The suburb has a total of 994 houses with an average of about 4 people living in each house, although it can be varying.

Kyalami Estates was built in around 1988 when Anglo American Properties conceived the idea of building a safe and secure residential accommodation for all residents.
