= Eduvos =

South African private tertiary education institution

- Motto: Your Education. Your Future.
- Type: Private
- Established: 1979; 47 years ago
- Parent institution: Neted Group
- Head: Mandi Joubert (Executive Head of Academics); Siegie Brownlee (CEO)
- Students: 23,000+ (2026)
- Location: Midrand, Gauteng, South Africa; 26.0205°S 28.1343°E
- Campus: 12 suburban campuses
- Language: English
- Colors: Navy and turquoise
- Nickname: Vossies
- Website: www.eduvos.com

Eduvos that is formerly Pearson Institute of Higher Education and Midrand Graduate Institute (MGI) and Computer Training Institute (CTI) is a South African private higher education institution that is headquartered in Midrand, Gauteng.

As of 2026, Eduvos operates 12 campuses across South Africa, and has a total enrolment of over 23,000 students.

== History ==
In 1979, Computer Training Institute (CTI) was founded.

In 2006, the institution partnered with the Midrand Graduate Institute (MGI), which was founded in 1989. MGI later became known as Midrand University.

In 2011, CTI and MGI merged to form the Pearson Institute of Higher Education (PIHE). Over time, the institution grew to have 12 campuses across South Africa.

In November 2020, Pearson announced the disposal of its interests in PIHE, and in 2021, the institution was sold to a consortium led by Stellenbosch Graduate Institute (SGI) and EXEO Capital. The new company registered as the NetEd Group. After the sale, PIHE rebranded as Eduvos.

In 2023, Eduvos welcomed a record number of 9,800 new first-year students.

== Campuses ==
Eduvos has 12 campuses located across South Africa, namely the Midrand, Pretoria, Bedfordview, Vanderbijlpark, Potchefstroom, Mbombela, Durban, East London, Nelson Mandela Bay, Tyger Valley (Bellville), Mowbray and Bloemfontein campuses. Each campus offers different student activities and clubs.

Eduvos also offers online and distance learning options. Eduvos Online is a national structure that virtually provides support to enrolled students attending remotely, online, or distance.

== Academics ==
Eduvos offers over 20 accredited qualifications across five faculties; Applied Science, Commerce, Humanities, Information technology, and Law.

The institution offers bachelor's degrees in commerce, information technology, law, social sciences, creative arts, communications, and bio sciences. Eduvos also offers a number of postgraduate qualifications.

== Accreditation and affiliations ==
Eduvos is registered with the Department of Education as a Higher Education Institution (No.2001/HE07/008) in accordance with the Higher Education Act, and its bachelor's degrees are accredited by the Council on Higher Education's Higher Education Quality Committee. All of Eduvos' qualifications are registered on the National Qualifications Framework by the South African Qualifications Authority. A number of qualifications are also accredited by local, international, professional, and industry bodies such as the Association of Chartered Certified Accountants in the UK. However, it is not registered with the Health Professions Council of South Africa, though it is with the Design Education Forum of Southern Africa, the Chartered Institute of Management Accountants, the Midrand Tourism Association, the Computer Society of South Africa and the Information Technology Association.

Eduvos is accredited by the British Accreditation Council (BAC).

The institution was also the first private tertiary education institution in South Africa to become affiliated with the Golden Key Society. As of 2026, 1,088 Eduvos students have joined the institution's chapter of Golden Key.
