= Halfway House Estate =

- Location within Gauteng Location within South Africa
- Coordinates: 25.993°S 28.132°E
- Country: South Africa
- Province: Gauteng
- Municipality: City of Johannesburg
- Main Place: Midrand

Area
  - Total: 3.74 km^{2} (1.44 sq mi)

Population (2011)
  - Total: 541
  - Density: 145/km^{2} (375/sq mi)

Racial makeup (2011)
  - Black African: 77.1%
  - Coloured: 6.7%
  - Indian/Asian: 4.8%
  - White: 10.2%
  - Other: 1.3%

First languages (2011)
  - English: 26.6%
  - Zulu: 12.9%
  - Northern Sotho: 8.9%
  - Tswana: 8.1%
  - Other: 43.5%
- Time zone: UTC+2 (SAST)

Halfway House Estate is a suburb of Midrand, South Africa. It is located in Region A of the City of Johannesburg Metropolitan Municipality.

It is a suburb approximately 27 km north of Johannesburg and 18 km north-west of Kempton Park. It was laid out in 1890 and called thus because it was the stop halfway between Johannesburg and Pretoria for the Zeederberg coach service.
