= Marlboro (Gautrain station) =

Railway station near Johannesburg, South Africa

Coordinates: 26.0836°S 28.1114°E

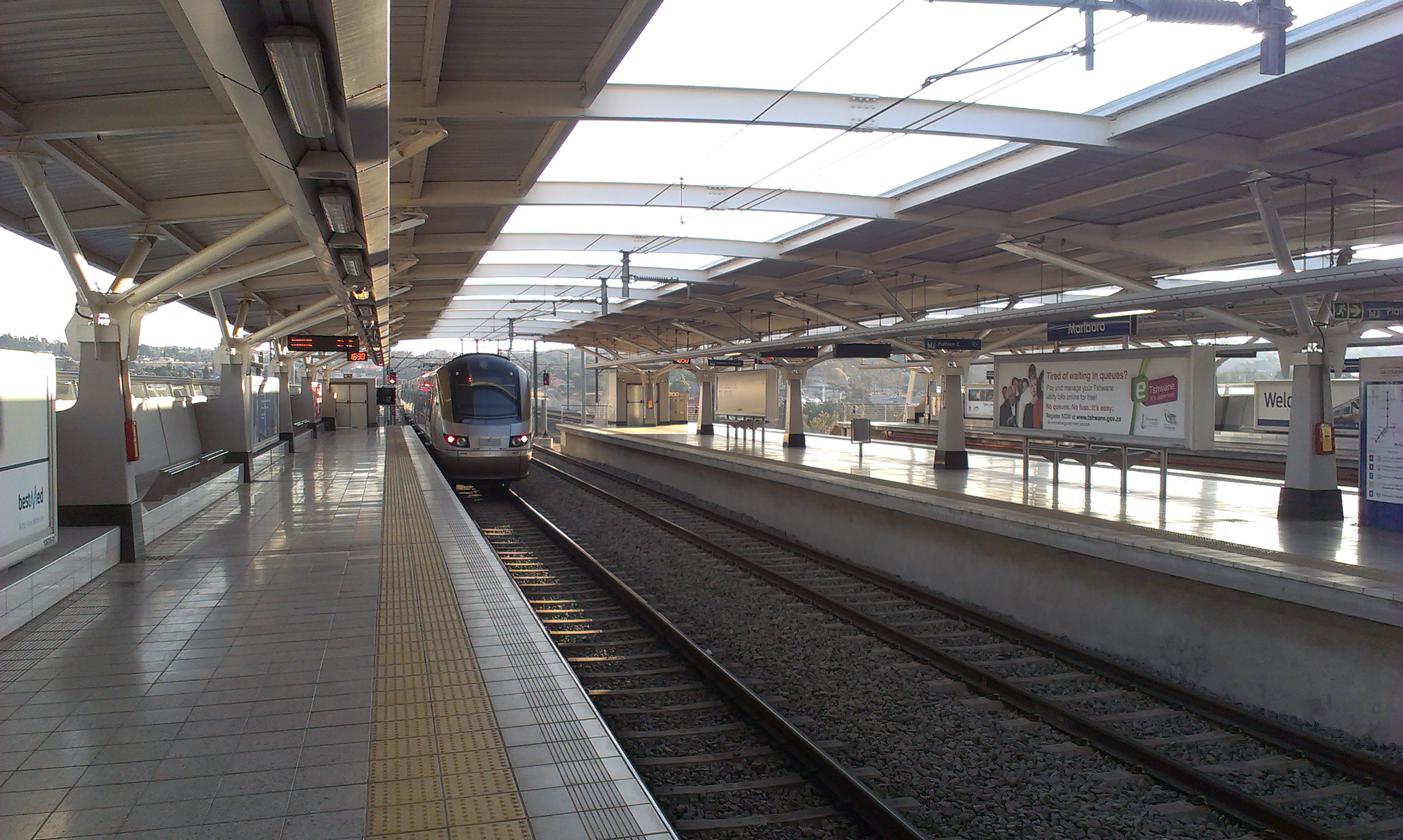
- A Gautrain arriving in the early evening at Marlboro st.

General information
- System: Gautrain rapid transit station
- Line: East–West Line North–South Line
- Platforms: 1 island platform 2 side platform
- Tracks: 4

Construction
- Parking: 1,200 spaces
- Accessible: yes

History
- Opened: 8 June 2010

Services
Preceding station	Gautrain	Following station
Sandton Terminus	East–West Line	Rhodesfield towards OR Tambo
Sandton towards Park Station	North–South Line	Midrand towards Hatfield
Location

Marlboro is a metro station on the Gautrain rapid transit system in Marlboro, Gauteng. It opened on 8 June 2010 with service to OR Tambo International Airport.

== Location ==
Marlboro is located near the southwestern corner of the interchange between the N3 Eastern Bypass and Marlboro Drive (M60) in the suburb of the same name. The surrounding area is mainly residential and includes the well-known township of Alexandra.

=== Transit-oriented development ===
One of the major aims of the Gautrain project is to reduce car dependency and its associated congestion through transit-oriented development (TOD). At Marlboro, this is accomplished by connecting the fragmented surrounding area with a pedestrian bridge across Marlboro Drive. Further, the TOD plan subdivides the Marlboro precinct into a number of areas, in particular Frankenwald and the Far East Bank.

== Station layout ==
Marlboro station has four tracks with an island platform and side platforms. As the station is the last before the north–south line to Pretoria and the Airport Line to OR Tambo International Airport split, a cross-platform interchange is facilitated by the use of an island platform.

== Gallery ==
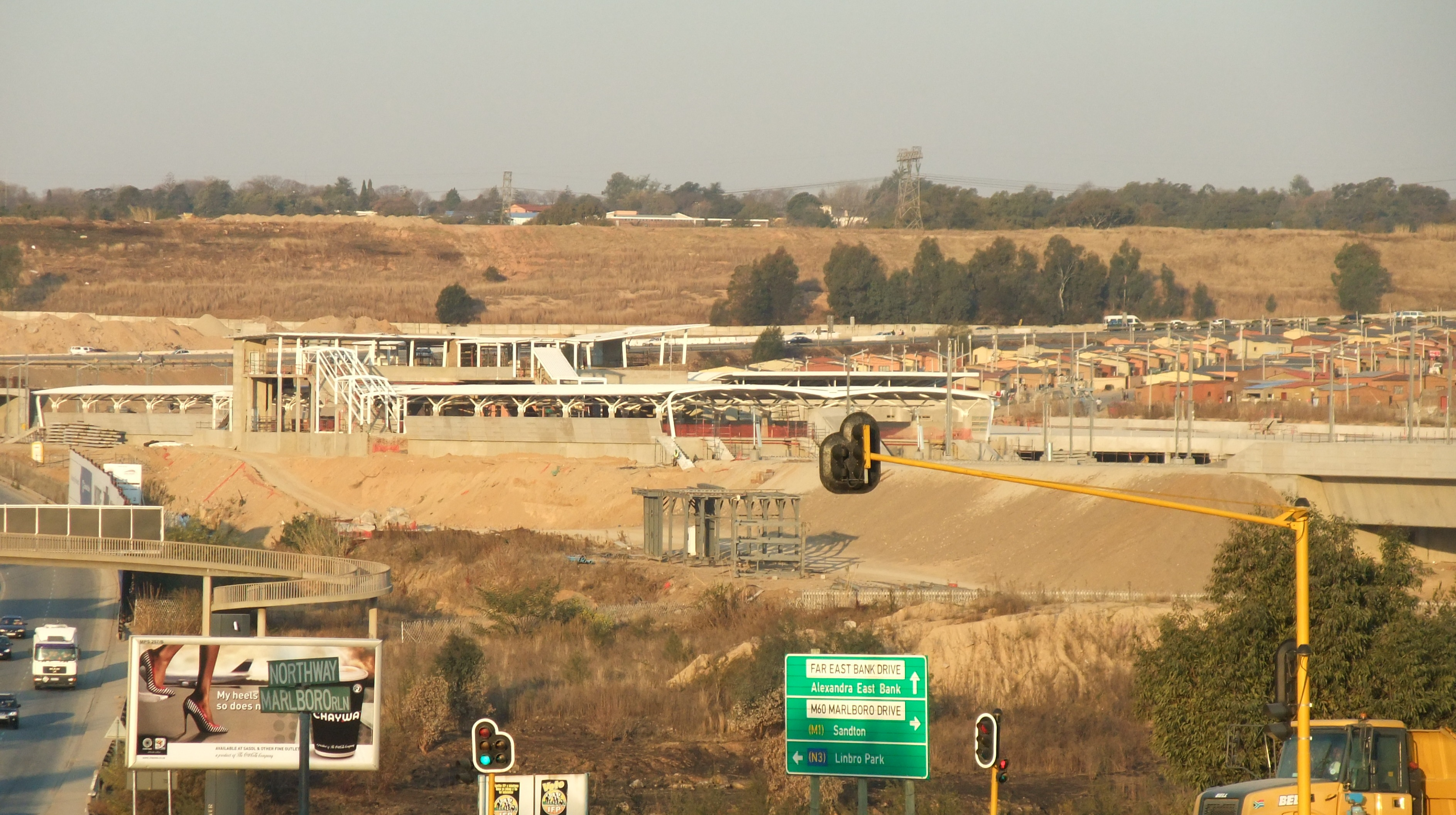
Marlboro station under construction
