= Crowthorne, Gauteng =

Crowthorne
- Location within Gauteng Location within South Africa
- Coordinates: 25°58′25″S 28°5′10″E
- Country: South Africa
- Province: Gauteng
- Municipality: City of Johannesburg
- Main Place: Midrand

Area
  - Total: 2.68 km^{2} (1.03 sq mi)

Population (2011)
  - Total: 653
  - Density: 244/km^{2} (631/sq mi)

Racial makeup (2011)
  - Black African: 57.6%
  - Coloured: 0.3%
  - Indian/Asian: 1.8%
  - White: 40.0%
  - Other: 0.3%

First languages (2011)
  - English: 32.8%
  - Zulu: 10.6%
  - Afrikaans: 10.1%
  - Southern Ndebele: 8.9%
  - Other: 37.6%
- Time zone: UTC+2 (SAST)
- Postal code (street): 1685
- PO box: 1684
- Area code: 011

Crowthorne is a suburb of Midrand, South Africa. It is located in Region A of the City of Johannesburg Metropolitan Municipality, between Pretoria and Johannesburg on the previously known Carlswald Agricultural Holdings. The region is surrounded by plots, horse breeding societies and agricultural activities; neighbouring areas like Beaulieu, Kyalami (and Waterfall Estate), Blue Hills etc.

Most of the residential roads are still dirt roads, contributing to a rural atmosphere. The Denneboom chicken farm is situated between the Carlswald Meadows estate and the Carslwald North estate in Crowthorne.

The R55 (Woodmead Rd extension) and Main Rd (which originates from Bryanston in Sandton) gives access to the Suburb as well as New Road when travelling from Pretoria side.
