= Blue Hills, Gauteng =

Blue Hills
- Location within Gauteng Location within South Africa
- Coordinates: 25.9492°S 28.0844°E
- Country: South Africa
- Province: Gauteng
- Municipality: City of Johannesburg
- Main Place: Midrand

Area
  - Total: 13.82 km^{2} (5.34 sq mi)

Population (2011)
  - Total: 4,906
  - Density: 355.0/km^{2} (919.4/sq mi)

Racial makeup (2011)
  - Black African: 50.0%
  - Coloured: 1.4%
  - Indian/Asian: 12.5%
  - White: 35.5%
  - Other: 0.6%

First languages (2011)
  - English: 49.2%
  - Afrikaans: 10.5%
  - Zulu: 9.4%
  - Tswana: 5.9%
  - Other: 25.0%
- Time zone: UTC+2 (SAST)
- Postal code (street): 1685
- PO box: 1685

Blue Hills is a suburb of Midrand, South Africa. It is located in Region A of the City of Johannesburg Metropolitan Municipality.
