= Vorna Valley =

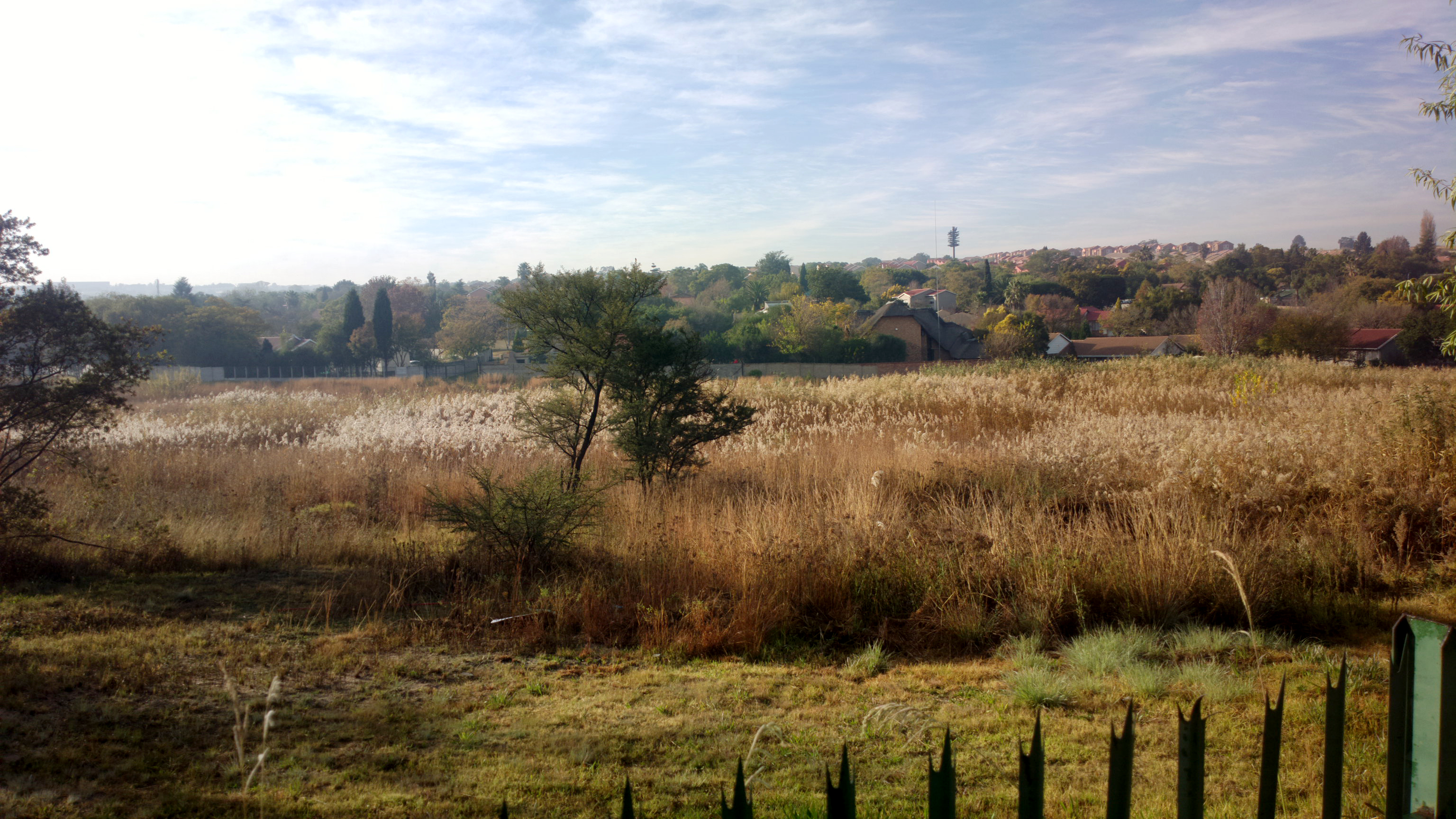

- Location within Gauteng Location within South Africa
- Coordinates: 25.99833°S 28.10722°E
- Country: South Africa
- Province: Gauteng
- Municipality: City of Johannesburg
- Main Place: Midrand

Government
  - Councillor: Annette Deppe

Area
  - Total: 3.44 km^{2} (1.33 sq mi)

Population (2011)
  - Total: 12,446
  - Density: 3,620/km^{2} (9,370/sq mi)

Racial makeup (2011)
  - Black African: 53.4%
  - Coloured: 4.2%
  - Indian/Asian: 25.0%
  - White: 16.3%
  - Other: 1.1%

First languages (2011)
  - English: 54.8%
  - Zulu: 9.3%
  - Afrikaans: 5.4%
  - Tswana: 5.0%
  - Other: 25.5%
- Time zone: UTC+2 (SAST)
- Postal code (street): 1686
- PO box: 1686

Vorna Valley is a suburb of Midrand, South Africa. It is located in Region A of the City of Johannesburg Metropolitan Municipality.

== History ==
Vorna Valley derives its name from the Galaun family's home village of Varniai (Vornia), Lithuania. Jacob and Michle, father and mother of brothers Joseph, Israel, Louis, Harry, Abe, and sisters Leah, Malka and Tzira, lived in Lithuania. Jacob owned a butchery and leased a piece of land on which they kept cattle. Michle came from a cheese-making family. The Galaun family sold cheese as well as milk to supplement their income from their butchery.

Many Jewish youths from Lithuania emigrated due to the military conscription, poverty and anti-semitism. Harry Galaun moved to South Africa where he established himself as an established property developer and owned a bottle store and land known as Halfway House. Harry eventually established the township of Vorna Valley in the 1970s.

The main arterial road was named after Harry Galaun while other streets in the suburb were named after mainly South African artists, poets, writers, performers and influential people in the world of arts at that time.
