= Tulisa Park =

- Location within Gauteng Location within South Africa
- Coordinates: 26.249°S 28.100°E
- Country: South Africa
- Province: Gauteng
- Municipality: City of Johannesburg
- Main Place: Johannesburg
- Established: 1952

Area
  - Total: 1.09 km^{2} (0.42 sq mi)

Population (2011)
  - Total: 1,737
  - Density: 1,590/km^{2} (4,130/sq mi)

Racial makeup (2011)
  - Black African: 39.5%
  - Coloured: 6.8%
  - Indian/Asian: 5.3%
  - White: 48.0%
  - Other: 0.5%

First languages (2011)
  - English: 45.0%
  - Afrikaans: 26.3%
  - Zulu: 9.9%
  - Sotho: 3.5%
  - Other: 15.3%
- Time zone: UTC+2 (SAST)

Tulisa Park is a suburb of Johannesburg, South Africa. It is located in Region F of the City of Johannesburg Metropolitan Municipality.

== History ==
The suburb was established by mining group Gold Fields of South Africa on 24 December 1952.

== Economy ==
The area is the site of manufacturing facilities for heavy mining equipment including bottom dump off-highway trucks.
