= Ridgeway, Johannesburg =

Ridgeway
- Location within Gauteng Location within South Africa
- Coordinates: 26.2646°S 27.9962°E
- Country: South Africa
- Province: Gauteng
- Municipality: City of Johannesburg
- Main Place: Johannesburg

Area
  - Total: 2.98 km^{2} (1.15 sq mi)

Population (2011)
  - Total: 8,723
  - Density: 2,930/km^{2} (7,580/sq mi)

Racial makeup (2011)
  - Black African: 45.4%
  - Coloured: 11.8%
  - Indian/Asian: 23.9%
  - White: 17.2%
  - Other: 1.7%

First languages (2011)
  - English: 51.2%
  - Zulu: 11.4%
  - Afrikaans: 11.0%
  - Tswana: 6.3%
  - Other: 20.1%
- Time zone: UTC+2 (SAST)
- Postal code (street): 2091
- PO box: 2099

Ridgeway is a suburb of Johannesburg, South Africa. It is located in Region F of the City of Johannesburg Metropolitan Municipality.

== History ==
The suburb is situated on an old farm of Kroonheuwel. It had several names over the years such as Greenfields Park, Ridgebourne (after owners JM Beveridge and R Osbourne) before obtaining its current name in 1959.

== Religion ==
Ridgeway has a growing Muslim population due to a mosque that was built in 2008.
