= Ebony Park =

- Location within Gauteng Location within South Africa
- Coordinates: 25.999°S 28.177°E
- Country: South Africa
- Province: Gauteng
- Municipality: City of Johannesburg

Area
  - Total: 1.63 km^{2} (0.63 sq mi)

Population (2011)
  - Total: 22,309
  - Density: 13,700/km^{2} (35,400/sq mi)

Racial makeup (2011)
  - Black African: 98.9%
  - Coloured: 0.6%
  - Indian/Asian: 0.1%
  - White: 0.1%
  - Other: 0.3%

First languages (2011)
  - Northern Sotho: 29.9%
  - Zulu: 23.3%
  - Tswana: 7.9%
  - Tsonga: 7.7%
  - Other: 31.2%
- Time zone: UTC+2 (SAST)
- Postal code (street): 1682
- PO box: 1690

Ebony Park is a suburb in Midrand, north-east of Johannesburg, South Africa. It is located in Region A of the City of Johannesburg Metropolitan Municipality, adjacent to Ivory Park.
