= Bridle Park =

- Location within Gauteng Location within South Africa
- Coordinates: 25°56′00″S 28°03′40″E
- Country: South Africa
- Province: Gauteng
- Municipality: City of Johannesburg
- Main Place: Midrand

Area
  - Total: 2.09 km^{2} (0.81 sq mi)

Population (2011)
  - Total: 276
  - Density: 132/km^{2} (342/sq mi)

Racial makeup (2011)
  - Black African: 56.4%
  - Indian/Asian: 1.5%
  - White: 42.2%

First languages (2011)
  - English: 43.3%
  - Zulu: 13.4%
  - Northern Sotho: 6.1%
  - Afrikaans: 5.4%
  - Other: 31.8%
- Time zone: UTC+2 (SAST)

Bridle Park is a suburb of Midrand, South Africa, just east of Diepsloot. It is located in Region A of the City of Johannesburg Metropolitan Municipality.
