= Rabie Ridge =

- Location within Gauteng Location within South Africa
- Coordinates: 26.022°S 28.174°E
- Country: South Africa
- Province: Gauteng
- Municipality: City of Johannesburg
- Established: 1994

Area
  - Total: 3.33 km^{2} (1.29 sq mi)

Population (2011)
  - Total: 41,204
  - Density: 12,400/km^{2} (32,000/sq mi)

Racial makeup (2011)
  - Black African: 90.3%
  - Coloured: 8.8%
  - Indian/Asian: 0.2%
  - White: 0.1%
  - Other: 0.5%

First languages (2011)
  - Northern Sotho: 32.0%
  - Zulu: 16.2%
  - Tsonga: 9.7%
  - Afrikaans: 8.9%
  - Other: 33.1%
- Time zone: UTC+2 (SAST)
- Postal code (street): 1632
- PO box: 1688
- Area code: 1685

Rabie Ridge is a township near Johannesburg, South Africa. It is located in Region A of the City of Johannesburg Metropolitan Municipality and is located east of Midrand (adjacent to Tembisa). It is a township formed due to forced removals of the coloured community from Alexandra and is named after Jack Rabie.

Rabie Ridge has a vast majority of people living there which speak different South African languages like Afrikaans, isiZulu, Sesotho and others.
