= Gillview =

- Location within Gauteng Location within South Africa
- Coordinates: 26.264°S 28.026°E
- Country: South Africa
- Province: Gauteng
- Municipality: City of Johannesburg
- Main Place: Johannesburg
- Established: 1963

Area
  - Total: 0.32 km^{2} (0.12 sq mi)

Population (2011)
  - Total: 1,027
  - Density: 3,200/km^{2} (8,300/sq mi)

Racial makeup (2011)
  - Black African: 29.8%
  - Coloured: 20.9%
  - Indian/Asian: 24.2%
  - White: 24.1%
  - Other: 1.0%

First languages (2011)
  - English: 65.8%
  - Afrikaans: 6.4%
  - Sotho: 6.3%
  - Zulu: 5.9%
  - Other: 15.6%
- Time zone: UTC+2 (SAST)
- Postal code (street): 2091

Gillview is a suburb of Johannesburg, South Africa. It is located in Region F of the City of Johannesburg Metropolitan Municipality.

== History ==
The suburb is situated on an old Witwatersrand farm of Turffontein. It was proclaimed as a suburb on 27 November 1963 and is named after the lands developer, Gilbert 'Gill' Tunmer and view of the valley.
