= Glen Austin =

- Location within Gauteng Location within South Africa
- Coordinates: 25°58′S 28°9′E
- Country: South Africa
- Province: Gauteng
- Municipality: City of Johannesburg

Area
  - Total: 12.09 km^{2} (4.67 sq mi)

Population (2001)
  - Total: 3,703
  - Density: 306.3/km^{2} (793.3/sq mi)
- Time zone: UTC+2 (SAST)
- Postal code (street): 1685
- PO box: 1685

Glen Austin is a suburb of Midrand, South Africa. It is located in Region A of the City of Johannesburg Metropolitan Municipality. The stands within Glen Austin are all classed as Agricultural Holdings, with none being smaller than 8500 square meters.

== History ==
In the 19th century a Voortrekker named Daniel Erasmus pegged out the area known today as Midrand as his land. On his death, Daniel's granddaughter, Anne Erasmus, as part of her inheritance, was willed land which included the Glen Austin area. In 1920 Anne married Mr Eustace Gain Austin and from that union came the name Glen Austin.
