= Randjesfontein Agricultural Holdings =

- Location within Gauteng Location within South Africa
- Coordinates: 25.9403°S 28.1651°E
- Country: South Africa
- Province: Gauteng
- Municipality: City of Johannesburg
- Main Place: Midrand

Area
  - Total: 11.77 km^{2} (4.54 sq mi)

Population (2011)
  - Total: 1,523
  - Density: 129.4/km^{2} (335.1/sq mi)

Racial makeup (2011)
  - Black African: 44.6%
  - Coloured: 1.2%
  - Indian/Asian: 2.0%
  - White: 52.2%

First languages (2011)
  - English: 45.2%
  - Afrikaans: 17.6%
  - Xhosa: 9.4%
  - Zulu: 5.4%
  - Other: 22.4%
- Time zone: UTC+2 (SAST)

Randjesfontein Agricultural Holdings is a rural settlement in Gauteng, South Africa. It is located in Midrand, Region A of the City of Johannesburg Metropolitan Municipality.
