= Ivory Park =

- Location within Gauteng Location within South Africa
- Coordinates: 25.999°S 28.196°E
- Country: South Africa
- Province: Gauteng
- Municipality: City of Johannesburg

Area
  - Total: 9.21 km^{2} (3.56 sq mi)

Population (2011)
  - Total: 184,383
  - Density: 20,000/km^{2} (51,900/sq mi)

Racial makeup (2011)
  - Black African: 98.8%
  - Coloured: 0.2%
  - Indian/Asian: 0.1%
  - White: 0.1%
  - Other: 0.8%

First languages (2011)
  - Northern Sotho: 23.3%
  - Tsonga: 22.5%
  - Zulu: 21.4%
  - Xhosa: 7.4%
  - Other: 25.4%
- Time zone: UTC+2 (SAST)
- Postal code (street): 1693
- PO box: 1689

Ivory Park is a densely populated residential suburb of Midrand in the Gauteng province of South Africa. It is located in Region A of the City of Johannesburg.

Ivory Park is occupied by more than 182 000 black people and is located in the town of Midrand in the City of Johannesburg Metropolitan Municipality. It is situated adjacent to the township of Tembisa in the neighbouring City of Ekurhuleni Metropolitan Municipality and is usually but inaccurately treated as being part of it. Services in Ivory Park have improved since the early 1990s. It has five clinics, eight schools, a police station, two libraries and is served by the popular Voice of Tembisa FM community radio station.
