= Noordwyk =

- Location within Gauteng Location within South Africa
- Coordinates: 25.955°S 28.119°E
- Country: South Africa
- Province: Gauteng
- Municipality: City of Johannesburg
- Main Place: Midrand

Area
  - Total: 4.36 km^{2} (1.68 sq mi)

Population (2011)
  - Total: 11,514
  - Density: 2,640/km^{2} (6,840/sq mi)

Racial makeup (2011)
  - Black African: 62.7%
  - Coloured: 4.4%
  - Indian/Asian: 20.2%
  - White: 12.2%
  - Other: 0.6%

First languages (2011)
  - English: 45.6%
  - Zulu: 12.0%
  - Tswana: 6.8%
  - Xhosa: 6.8%
  - Other: 28.7%
- Time zone: UTC+2 (SAST)
- Postal code (street): 1687
- PO box: 1687

Noordwyk is a suburb of Midrand, South Africa. It is located in Region A of the City of Johannesburg Metropolitan Municipality.
