= Ben Schoeman Freeway =

Road in South Africa

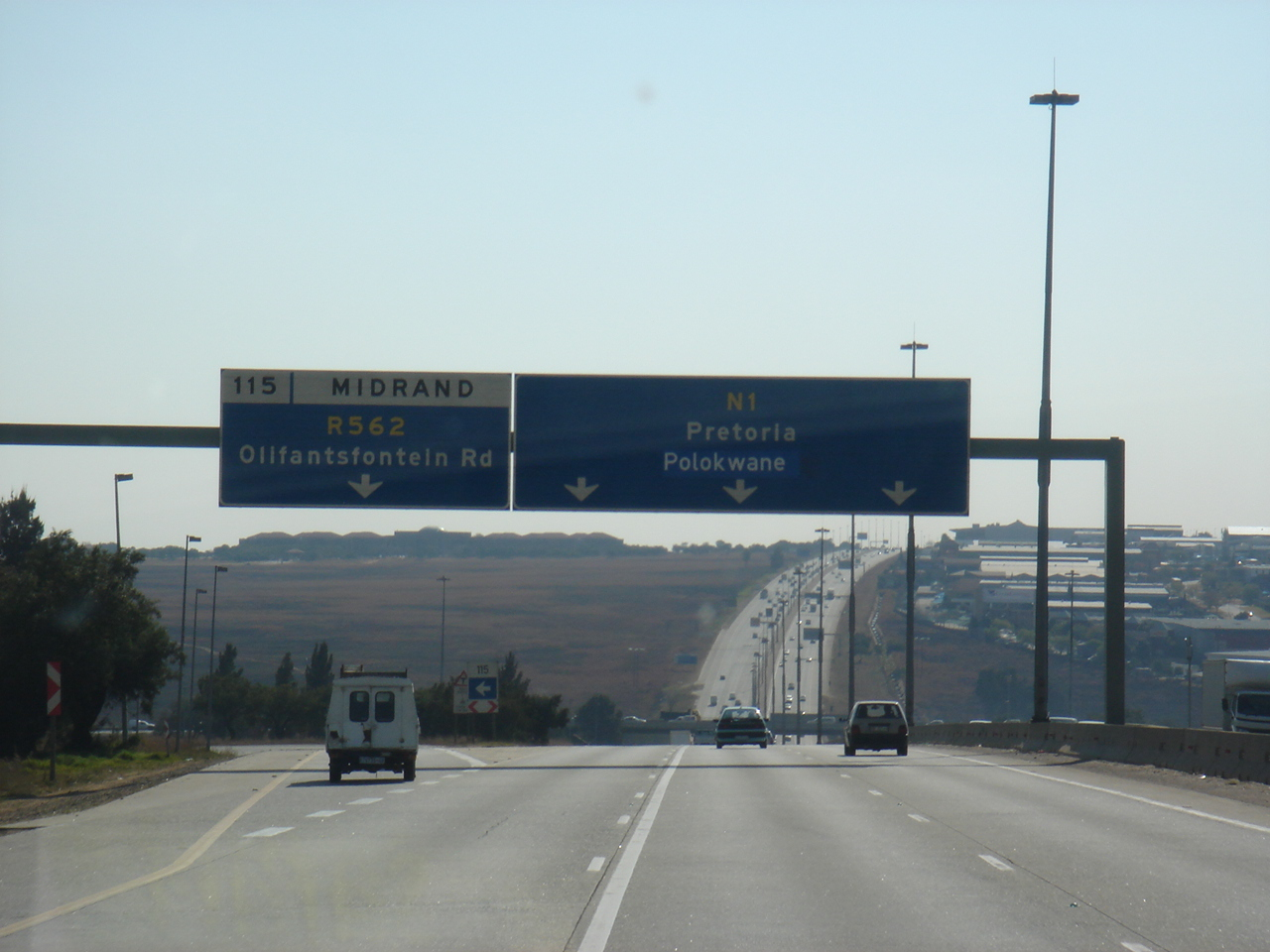
The Ben Schoeman Highway heading in the direction of Pretoria

The Ben Schoeman Freeway or Ben Schoeman Highway is the main freeway between Johannesburg and Pretoria, and consists of portions of the M1, N1, and N14. Opened in 1968, it is named after former Minister of Transport Ben Schoeman, and is undoubtedly the busiest road in South Africa.

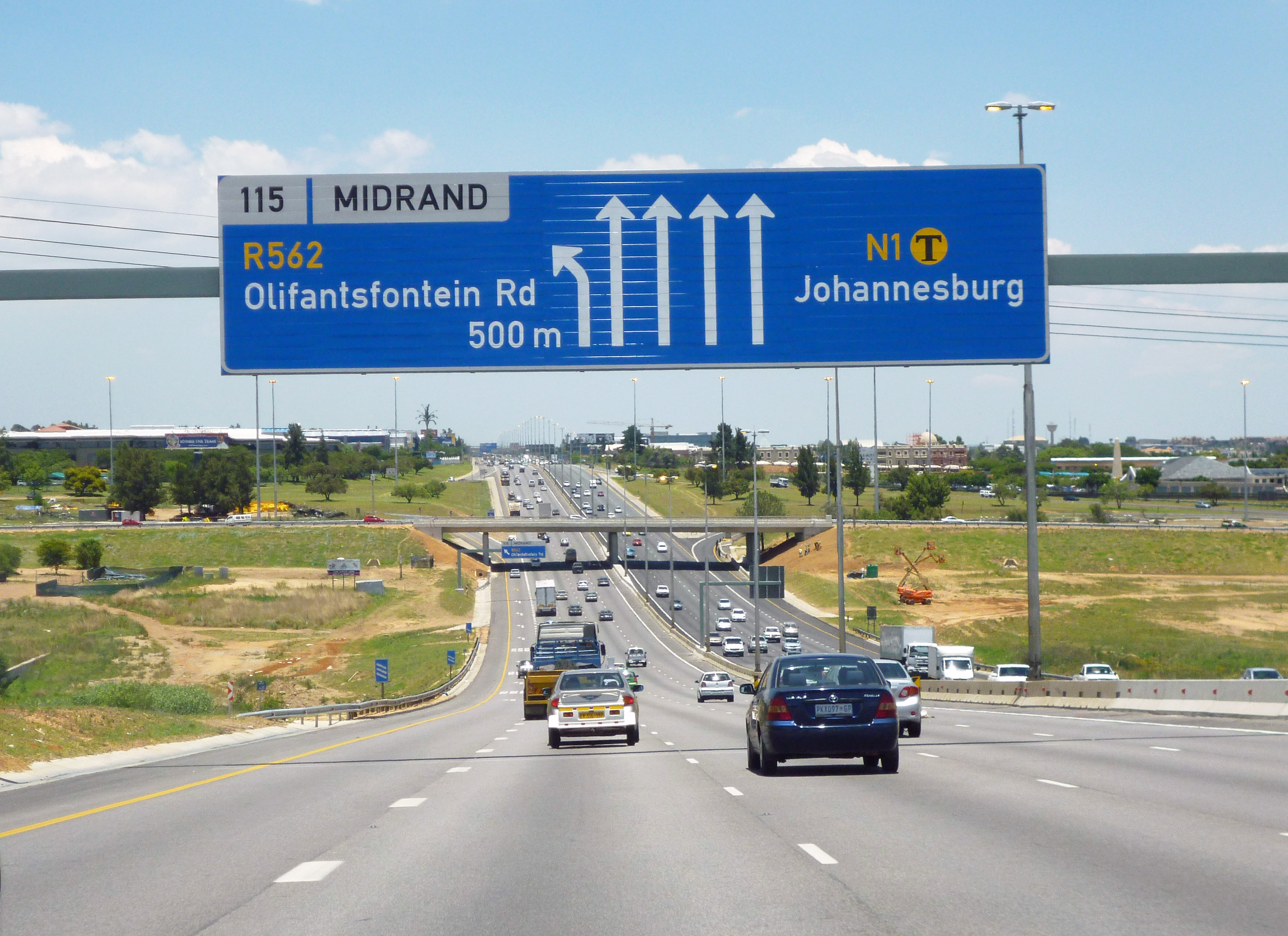
The Ben Schoeman Highway heading in the direction of Johannesburg (2011).

== Route ==
The Ben Schoeman Highway begins under the designation of the M1, just north of the Corlett Drive exit, where the M1 is no longer under the maintenance of the Johannesburg Roads Agency. South of Corlett Drive, the M1 is known as the De Villiers Graaff Motorway.

The M1 ends at the Buccleuch interchange with the N3 and N1 highways (Johannesburg Ring Road). The Ben Schoeman Highway then becomes the N1 and passes through Midrand and Centurion.

In Centurion, at the Brakfontein interchange, the N1 meets the N14 and they switch highways, with the N1 becoming the eastwards highway (Pretoria Bypass), heading to the eastern suburbs of Pretoria and to Polokwane. The N14 leaves the eastwards highway and becomes the Ben Schoeman Highway northwards.

The entire N1 section, from the Buccleuch Interchange to the Brakfontein Interchange, was a toll road from 3 December 2013 as part of the Gauteng e-toll system (with open road tolling). On 12 April 2024, e-tolls were discontinued in Gauteng, making the Ben Schoeman Freeway a toll-free road.

From the Brakfontein Interchange, the Ben Schoeman Highway continues northwards as the N14 directly into Pretoria, ending where it meets the R101 at Kgosi Mampuru Street (formerly Potgieter Street) in Salvokop, south of Pretoria Central.

The highway was in fact opened in the reverse order, beginning in 1968 with the section from Potgieter Street to just south of Brakfontein. The second section to be opened ran from Brakfontein to just south of the then Halfway House. The final section linked up the highway to the Buccleuch Interchange and Old Pretoria Main Road.

== Maintenance and upgrades ==
The M1 and N1 sections of the Ben Schoeman Highway, that is from the Corlett Drive (M30) off-ramp to the Brakfontein Interchange, are maintained by SANRAL. However, only the N1 section, which is the portion between the Buccleuch and Brakfontein interchanges, was tolled as part of the e-toll system. The N14 section, which is from the Brakfontein Interchange to Potgieter Street (R101) in Pretoria, is maintained by the Gauteng Provincial Government.

Two major upgrades have been done on the Ben Schoeman Highway, which was initially 2 lanes in each direction from Potgieter Street to Corlett Drive.

a) The first upgrade in the late 1980s saw the section between Buccleuch and Brakfontein Interchanges upgraded to a minimum of 3 lanes in each direction. The highway was completely rebuilt using concrete. New interchanges were added at the New Road and Samrand Avenue.

b) The second major upgrade of the highway, also from Buccleuch interchange to the Brakfontein Interchange was part of the Gauteng Freeway Improvement Project. The highway was upgraded from 3 lanes to 4 - 5 lanes in each direction, although between the Buccleuch Interchange and the M39 Allandale Road Interchange this has been increased to 6 lanes. Although concrete underlies some of the lanes for heavy/slow traffic, the road surface is now tar for the entire length of the Ben Schoeman Highway.

The highway has also been upgraded between Corlett Drive and the Buccleuch Interchange and consists of 3/4 lanes in each direction. Lighting is found along the highway from Brakfontein Interchange to Corlett Drive. The highway now includes upgraded overhead signage as well as electronic signage.

The northern section of the highway between Brakfontein Interchange and Potgieter Street has not been upgraded, although the road has been resurfaced at times. It remains 2 lanes in each direction, does not have central lighting, and does not have any overhead signage. As a result of the Gautrain route, the diamond interchange at Trichardt Street was changed, and so southbound traffic now exits to Snake Valley Road and no longer Trichardt Street.

== Major interchanges ==
The two main interchanges on the Ben Schoeman highway northwards are the Buccleuch Interchange (with the N3 Eastern Bypass and N1 Western Bypass), where the Ben Schoeman Highway changes from M1 to N1 designation, and the Brakfontein Interchange (with the N1 Danie Joubert Freeway - Pretoria Eastern Bypass - and N14 to Krugersdorp), where the highway changes from N1 to N14 designation.

The interchange between the N1 and M39 (formerly the R561), known as the Allandale Interchange, was completely redesigned as part of the Gauteng Freeway Improvement Project and is the only other free flowing interchange on the Ben Schoeman Highway.
