= Grand Central Airport =

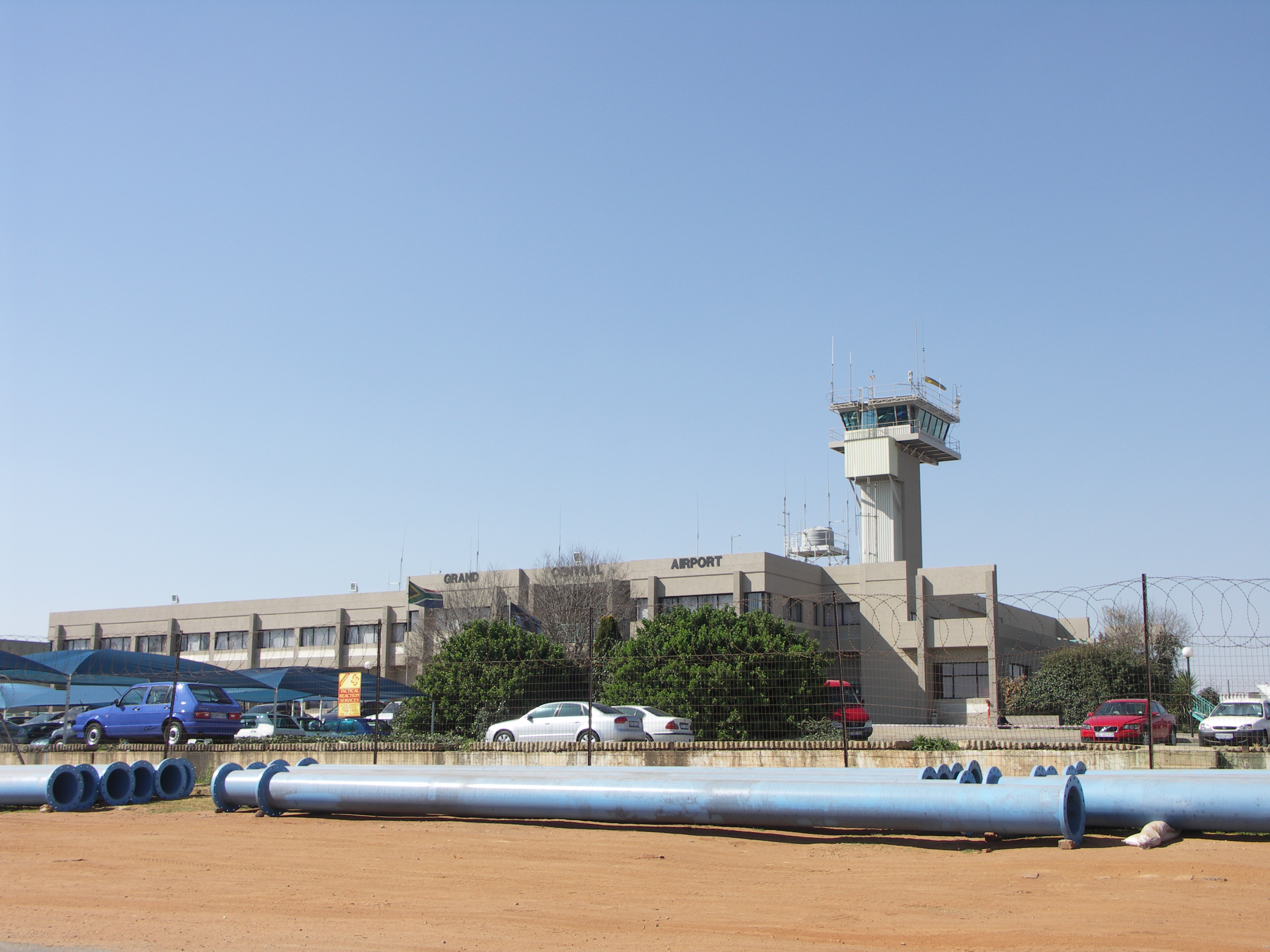
- IATA: GCJ; ICAO: FAGC

Summary
- Airport type: Public
- Owner: Old Mutual Life Assurance Company of South Africa since 2016
- Operator: Private
- Serves: City of Johannesburg
- Location: Midrand, South Africa
- Elevation AMSL: 5,327 ft / 1,624 m
- Coordinates: 25°59′11″S 028°08′24″E
- Website: Grand Central Airport

Map
- Location in the Johannesburg area

Runways
Direction	Length		Surface
Direction	m	ft	Surface
17/35	1,830	6,004	Asphalt
- Source: DAFIF

Grand Central Airport (IATA: GCJ, ICAO: FAGC) is a privately owned and licensed airport which is open to public air traffic. It is located in Midrand, halfway between Johannesburg and Pretoria in South Africa. Prior permission to land at Grand Central is not required for light aircraft pilots; a radio call is sufficient.

The airfield was started in the 1930s by a group of motor racing enthusiasts who were also interested in flying. Their old race track, although no longer in use, can be seen from the air on the north west side of the airfield.

Grand Central is a fully equipped airfield and is open 24 hours a day. The complex incorporates a modern terminal building (although it lacks Customs facilities). It is also the base of numerous flying schools for both fixed-wing aircraft and helicopters. There are 2 or 3 fixed-base operators on the airfield which provides maintenance and repair facilities for light aircraft.

This is a small airfield that is restricted to light aircraft only.

== Aviation ==
- Non-directional beacon - GC372.5
