= Randjespark =

- Location within Gauteng Location within South Africa
- Coordinates: 25.958°S 28.136°E
- Country: South Africa
- Province: Gauteng
- Municipality: City of Johannesburg
- Main Place: Midrand
- Time zone: UTC+2 (SAST)

Randjespark is a suburb of Midrand, South Africa. It is located in Region A of the City of Johannesburg Metropolitan Municipality.

The area has been subject to several power outages and disconnected services. In 2023, the area gained attention after a car dealership in the locality had their power cut for refusal to settle past bills. In January 2025, unplanned outages took place across the neighborhood. In June 2025, power was cut to allow network maintenance.
