= Midrand =

Town in Gauteng, South Africa

- Location within Gauteng Location within South Africa Location within Africa
- Coordinates: 25°59′57″S 28°7′35″E
- Country: South Africa
- Province: Gauteng
- Municipality: City of Johannesburg

Area
  - Total: 152.87 km^{2} (59.02 sq mi)

Population (2011)
  - Total: 87,387
  - Density: 571.64/km^{2} (1,480.5/sq mi)

Racial makeup (2011)
  - Black: 54.5%
  - Coloured: 3.3%
  - Indian/Asian: 17.0%
  - White: 24.2%
  - Other: 1.0%

First languages (2011)
  - English: 50.1%
  - Zulu: 10.2%
  - Afrikaans: 6.9%
  - Xhosa: 5.4%
  - Other: 27.4%
- Time zone: UTC+2 (SAST)
- Postal code (street): 1682

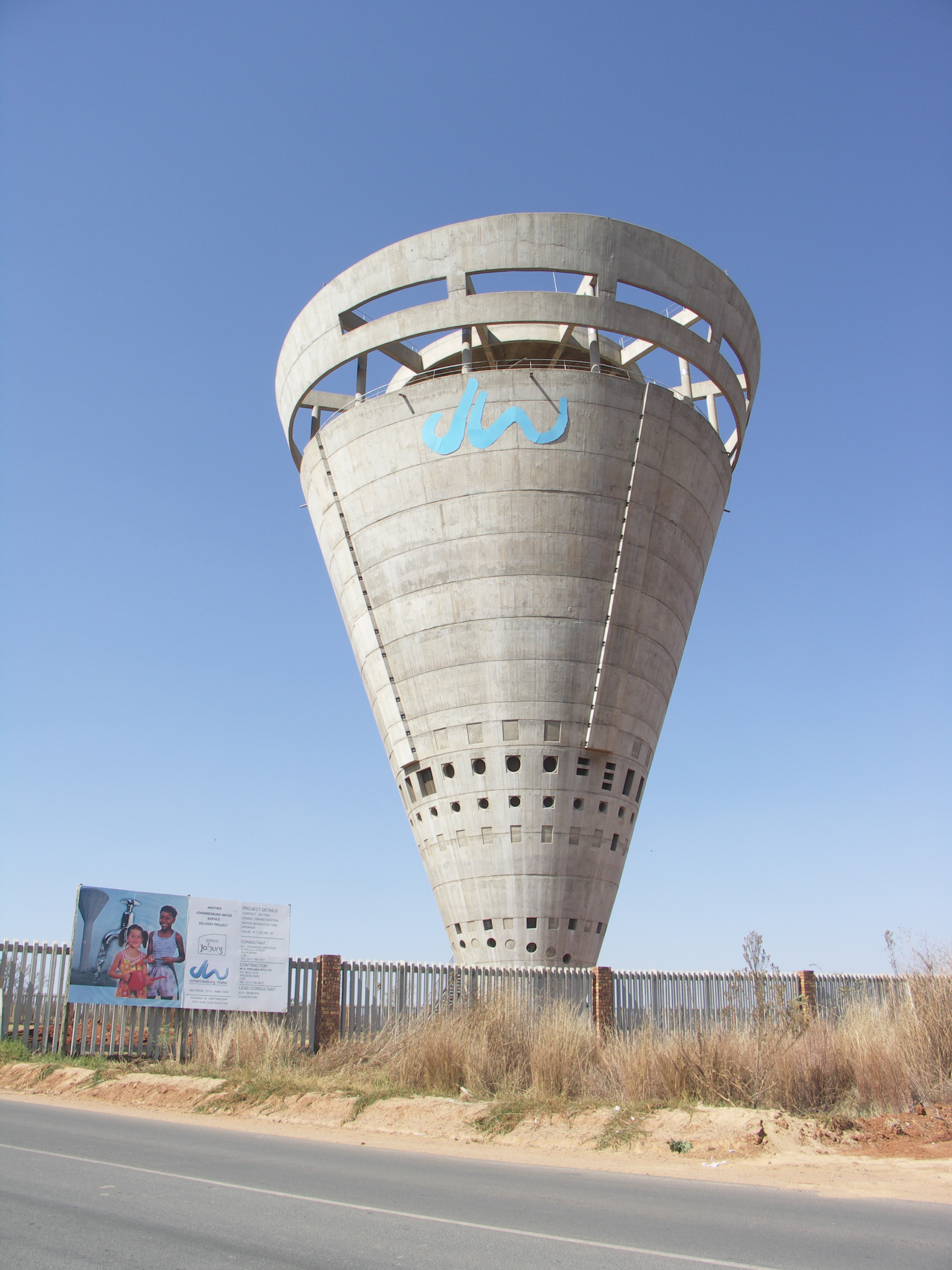
Johannesburg Water-Midrand Tower

Midrand is an area in central Gauteng, South Africa. It is situated in-between Centurion and Sandton. Formerly an independent municipality, Midrand now forms part of the City of Johannesburg Metropolitan Municipality.

== History ==
Midrand was established as a municipality in 1981 (in an area known as Halfway House, named after its position between Pretoria and Johannesburg), but ceased to be an independent town in the restructuring of local government that followed the end of apartheid in 1994. It was incorporated in the City of Johannesburg Metropolitan Municipality in 2000. It was made part of Region 2 and, as of 2006, when the number of regions were reduced to seven, it forms part of Region A of the City of Johannesburg.

Though no longer an independent town, the name Midrand is still in common use to denote the suburbs around the N1 highway north of the Jukskei River up to the border with the City of Tshwane Metropolitan Municipality (this portion of the N1 highway is also known as the Ben Schoeman Highway). Suburbs that are generally regarded as being in Midrand include among others: Country View, Carlswald, Crowthorne, Ebony Park, Glen Austin, Ivory Park, Kaalfontein, Rabie Ridge, Halfway House, Halfway Gardens, Vorna Valley, Noordwyk, Randjesfontein, Randjespark, Blue Hills, Kyalami Agricultural Holdings and Waterfall City.

In 2010, it was reported that the Tshwane Metropolitan Municipality wished to annex Midrand from the City of Johannesburg, reportedly to boost its income, which was severely strained.

The city is relatively modern, having experienced much growth in recent decades. Many businesses have relocated there due to its proximity to good highway links and its location in the economic centre of Gauteng Province. The development of Midrand has resulted in little break between the outskirts of Johannesburg and those of Pretoria.

== Government ==
The South African Civil Aviation Authority is headquartered in Midrand, as is the Railway Safety Regulator (RSR), and the National Credit Regulator. Midrand is also the location of the African Union's Pan-African Parliament and of the NEPAD secretariat.

== Geography ==
As the name suggests, Midrand lies centrally within the Gauteng province positioned halfway between Johannesburg to the south (27 km) and Pretoria to the north (30 km). It forms the northernmost part of the City of Johannesburg Metropolitan Municipality, bordering two other metropolitan municipalities within Gauteng namely the City of Tshwane to the north and the City of Ekurhuleni to the east. Midrand is flanked by Centurion to the north, Sandton to the south and Thembisa to the east.

== Landmarks ==
Midrand has the largest conference centre in South Africa which is known as Gallagher Estate which was built on the former site of Halfway House Primary School, which subsequently moved to new grounds near the fire station.

A landmark of Midrand is the Nizamiye Mosque, opened in 2012, the largest mosque in South Africa. The Classical Turkish-style mosque was personally funded by Turkish-born construction tycoon Ali Katircioglu at a cost of R210 million.

The largest single-phase shopping mall built in Africa, The Mall of Africa, is located in the Waterfall City precinct of the town.

It is now also home to the new headquarters for a multinational auditing-finance company, PWC. (Constructed by WSP) Visible, as currently (2018) the only skyscraper in Midrand. It will however be rivaled by its upcoming twin, The Falcon Building. Both the Falcon and PWC are in the same complex as Mall of Africa. Other landmarks include the Boulders Shopping centre, so named after the heritage site housing huge granite rocks which are approximately 3.5-billion years old.

== Business ==
Midrand is a thriving business node, home to the offices of major corporations such as Vodacom, Microsoft, Neotel, and Altech Autopage as well as an array of small and medium enterprises. Major South African tire retail and fitment chain store Tiger Wheel & Tyre has its headquarters in Midrand. The South African seafood restaurant franchise Ocean Basket also has its HQ in Midrand.

In 2013, Atterbury Properties announced plans to build the Mall of Africa, which would be one of the continent's largest. The Mall of Africa is located within the green, mixed-use Waterfall City precinct. The N1 Business Park and International Business Gateway are among the commercial developments in Midrand. The latest industrial development is called Waterfall Logistics Precinct.

== Education ==
The University of South Africa's Graduate School of Business Leadership is located in Midrand. The Pearson Institute of Higher Education formerly known as Midrand Graduate Institute, was officially opened on 9 May 1990. A Varsity College campus was established in 2012. Macmillan Education South Africa relocated their offices in June 2017 from Melrose Arch. There are primary and high schools located in several areas.

== Sports ==
Kyalami, an international renowned racetrack is in Midrand and is the venue for many of South Africa's premier motor racing events. The South African Lipizzaners riding academy is situated in the smallholdings of Kyalami.

== Transport ==
Midrand lies along the N1 (Ben Schoeman Freeway) which runs through the town in a northerly direction from Johannesburg to Pretoria. Midrand is connected to the N1 by the M39 Allandale Road, M71 New Road, R562 Olifantsfontein Road and the M36 Samrand Road in Centurion. The N3 (Eastern Bypass) lying just south of Midrand, intersects the N1 at the Buccleuch Interchange and runs southwards to Germiston and Durban.

Midrand is intersected by three regional routes, namely; the R101 (Pretoria Main Road) from Sandton to Centurion and Pretoria, the R55 from Sandton to Centurion and Pretoria and the R562 from Thembisa to Diepsloot. Metropolitan routes within the Greater Johannesburg metropolitan region that intersect in Midrand include the M38 (Modderfontein Road; Allan Road) and M39 (Allandale Road), both connecting the town with Kempton Park to the south-east.

Midrand is the home of Grand Central Airport and also to one of the stations in the Gautrain rapid rail system on the route from Pretoria to Sandton.

== Climate ==
Köppen-Geiger climate classification system classifies its climate as subtropical highland (Cwb).

Climate data for Midrand
Month	Jan	Feb	Mar	Apr	May	Jun	Jul	Aug	Sep	Oct	Nov	Dec	Year
Mean daily maximum °C (°F)	26.4 (79.5)	26.1 (79.0)	25.1 (77.2)	22.8 (73.0)	20.7 (69.3)	17.9 (64.2)	18.1 (64.6)	21 (70)	23.9 (75.0)	25 (77)	25.4 (77.7)	26.1 (79.0)	23.2 (73.8)
Daily mean °C (°F)	20.5 (68.9)	20.2 (68.4)	19 (66)	16.1 (61.0)	13.2 (55.8)	10.2 (50.4)	10.3 (50.5)	13 (55)	16.2 (61.2)	18.1 (64.6)	19.1 (66.4)	20 (68)	16.3 (61.4)
Mean daily minimum °C (°F)	14.6 (58.3)	14.3 (57.7)	12.9 (55.2)	9.5 (49.1)	5.7 (42.3)	2.5 (36.5)	2.6 (36.7)	5 (41)	8.6 (47.5)	11.3 (52.3)	12.9 (55.2)	14 (57)	9.5 (49.1)
Average precipitation mm (inches)	140 (5.5)	91 (3.6)	83 (3.3)	55 (2.2)	15 (0.6)	8 (0.3)	6 (0.2)	7 (0.3)	23 (0.9)	74 (2.9)	111 (4.4)	110 (4.3)	723 (28.5)
Source: Climate-Data.org (altitude: 1,587 m)
