= M27 (Pretoria) =

Road in Pretoria, South Africa

Metropolitan route M27

Route information
- Maintained by City of Tshwane Metropolitan Municipality
- Length: 13.2 km (8.2 mi)

Major junctions
- West end: M37 in Rooihuiskraal North

- R101 in Rooihuiskraal North; M19 in Centurion CBD M34 in Die Hoewes; M18 in Lyttelton Manor
- East end: M28 near Pierre van Ryneveld Park

Location
- Country: South Africa

Highway system
- Numbered routes of South Africa
← M26	→ M28

The M27 road is a short metropolitan route in the City of Tshwane in Gauteng, South Africa. It is in the city of Centurion, connecting Rooihuiskraal with Pierre van Ryneveld Park via the Centurion CBD and Lyttelton.

== Route ==
The M27 begins in Rooihuiskraal North, at a junction with the M37 route (Rooihuiskraal Road). It begins by heading eastwards as Theuns van Niekerk Street for a few metres before becoming Estcourt Avenue eastwards and reaching a junction with the R101 route (Old Johannesburg Road) in Hennopspark. The M27 continues eastwards as Lenchen Avenue to fly over the N14 highway (Ben Schoeman Freeway) and pass through the Zwartkop suburb to enter the Centurion CBD, where it temporarily becomes two one-way streets and meets the M19 route (John Vorster Drive).

It heads east-north-east, bypassing Centurion Mall before crossing the Hennops River on the south-eastern side of Centurion Lake (where it ceases to be one-way streets) and entering Die Hoewes, where it meets the M34 route (Jean Avenue). It continues east-north-east, still named Lenchen Avenue, then becoming River Road, to meet the M18 route (Botha Avenue; via an access road) in Lyttelton Manor. Just after meeting the M18, the M27 turns to the south-east as Theron Street for 1.7 kilometres before bending towards the north-east (bypassing the southern boundary of the Waterkloof Air Force Base) and heading another 2 kilometres to reach its end at a junction with the M28 route (Van Ryneveld Avenue) just north of Pierre van Ryneveld Park.
