= M34 (Pretoria) =

Road in Pretoria, South Africa

Metropolitan route M34

Route information
- Maintained by City of Tshwane Metropolitan Municipality
- Length: 9 km (5.6 mi)

Major junctions
- North-west end: M10 in Eldoraigne
- R114 in Eldoraigne; R101 in Eldoraigne; N14 near Clubview; M19 in Die Hoewes; M25 in Die Hoewes; M27 in Die Hoewes
- South-east end: M36 in Irene

Location
- Country: South Africa

Highway system
- Numbered routes of South Africa
← M33	→ M35

The M34 road is a metropolitan route in the City of Tshwane in Gauteng, South Africa. It is in the city of Centurion, connecting Eldoraigne with Irene via Clubview, Die Hoewes and Doringkloof.

== Route ==
The M34 begins in the suburb of Eldoraigne (south of Valhalla), at a junction with the M10 route (Wierda Road). It begins by going southwards as Saxby Avenue before bending eastwards and reaching a junction with the R114 route (Ruimte Road). It proceeds eastwards to reach a junction with the R101 route (Old Johannesburg Road) before crossing the Hennops River and entering the suburb of Clubview as Lyttelton Road.

Just after Clubview, the M34 crosses the N14 highway (Ben Schoeman Highway) as Jean Avenue and enters Die Hoewes, where it meets the M19 route (Rabie Street). It heads south-east, meeting the M25 route (Gerhard Street) and the M27 route (Lenchen Avenue), through the suburb of Doringkloof, to fly over the N1 highway (Pretoria Eastern Bypass; Danie Joubert Freeway) and reach its end at a junction with the M36 route (Alexandra Road; Olievenhoutbosch Avenue) in Irene.
