= M18 (Pretoria) =

Road in Gauteng

Metropolitan route M18

Route information
- Maintained by City of Tshwane Metropolitan Municipality and City of Ekurhuleni Metropolitan Municipality
- Length: 41.7 km (25.9 mi)

Major junctions
- North end: R101 / M22 in Pretoria CBD
- M4 in Pretoria CBD; R104 at Church Square; M2 in Pretoria CBD; M6 in Pretoria CBD; M11 in Pretoria CBD; M3 in Pretoria CBD; R21 / M5 / M7 at Fountains Valley; M7 at Fountains Valley; M10 in Lyttelton; M25 in Lyttelton; M19 in Lyttelton; M27 in Lyttelton; N1 in Doringkloof M36 in Irene; M31 in Irene M38 near Thembisa

- South end: M39 near Chloorkop

Location
- Country: South Africa
- Major cities: Pretoria, Centurion, Olifantsfontein, Thembisa

Highway system
- Numbered routes of South Africa
← M17	→ M19

The M18 road is a long metropolitan route in Gauteng, South Africa. It connects Pretoria with Thembisa via Centurion and Olifantsfontein.

It is an alternative route to the R21 freeway for travel between Pretoria and Thembisa.

== Route ==
The M18 begins in Pretoria, just north of the city centre, at a junction with the two one-way streets of the M22 route (Boom Street & Bloed Street). It begins as two one-way streets (Thabo Sehume Street, formerly Andries Street, southwards from the M22 and Bosman Street northwards to the M22), heading southwards. It meets the M4 road (Struben Street; Johannes Ramokhoase Street) before passing on either side of Church Square, where it meets the R104 road (Helen Joseph Street; WF Nkomo Street). It then meets the M2 road (Nana Sita Street) and the M6 road (Visagie Street).

At the junction with the M11 road (Jeff Masemola Street; Schieding Street), the M18 becomes one road south-south-east (no-longer one-way streets), becoming 3 lanes in each direction, to meet the southern terminus of the M3 road (Nelson Mandela Drive). The M18 becomes Nelson Mandela Drive southwards, being 4 lanes in each direction, and reaches a major junction north of Fountains Valley (known as Fountains Circle), where it meets the M7 road (George Storrar Drive), the southern terminus of the M5 road (Elandspoort Street) and the northern terminus of the R21 road (which connects to O. R. Tambo International Airport).

The M7 joins the M18 and they become one road south-west named Christina De Wit Avenue. After a kilometre, the M7 becomes its own road westwards while the M18 remains as Christina De Wit Avenue southwards to enter the city of Centurion. It passes through Kloofsig and the eastern suburb of Lyttelton as the main road (Botha Avenue), meeting the M10 road (Trichardt Road) before meeting the M19 road (Cantonments Road), the M25 road (Gerhard Street; which connects to the Centurion CBD) and the M27 road (Lenchen Avenue).

The M18 continues southwards to cross the N1 highway (Danie Joubert Freeway; Pretoria Eastern Bypass) and pass through the suburb of Irene, where it meets the M31 road (Nellmapius Drive). After the Irene suburb of Centurion, the M18 leaves the City of Tshwane Metropolitan Municipality and enters the City of Ekurhuleni Metropolitan Municipality. It enters the town centre of Clayville (Olifantsfontein) as Glen Road.

Just south of the Clayville town centre (adjacent to Olifantsfontein Railway Station), the M18 leaves Glen Road and becomes South View Road westwards. At the next junction, the M18 becomes Industry Road southwards. It passes through Clayville Industrial before crossing the R562 road (Winnie Madikizela-Mandela Road) as an underpass and leaving Olifantsfontein to enter the township of Thembisa.

It bypasses Tembisa Hospital southwards as Reverend RTJ Namane Drive. In the Moriting suburb, the road curves to the west and reaches a junction with Andrew Mapheto Drive, where the M18 becomes Andrew Mapheto Drive towards the south-west. It passes through the Thembisa CBD as the main road before passing in-between the Birch Acres suburb of Kempton Park and the Phomolong suburb of Thembisa. It then meets the southern terminus of the M38 road (Modderfontein Road) and reaches its end at the next junction, where it meets the M39 road (Chloorkop Road; Zuurfontein Avenue).
