= M25 (Pretoria) =

Road in Pretoria, South Africa

Metropolitan route M25

Route information
- Maintained by City of Tshwane Metropolitan Municipality
- Length: 8.7 km (5.4 mi)

Major junctions
- West end: M37 in Wierdapark

- R101 in Hennopspark; M19 in Centurion CBD M34 in Die Hoewes
- East end: M18 in Lyttelton Manor

Location
- Country: South Africa

Highway system
- Numbered routes of South Africa
← M24	→ M26

The M25 road is a short metropolitan route in the City of Tshwane in Gauteng, South Africa. It is in the city of Centurion, connecting Wierdapark with Lyttelton via the Centurion CBD.

== Route ==
The M25 begins in Wierdapark, at a junction with the M37 route (Rooihuiskraal Road) adjacent to Reds Shopping Centre. It begins by heading eastwards as Hendrik Verwoerd Drive for 2.7 kilometres, passing in-between Wierdapark and Rooihuiskraal North, to reach a junction with the R101 route (Old Johannesburg Road) in Hennopspark.

The M25 continues eastwards to fly over the N14 highway (Ben Schoeman Freeway) and enter the Centurion CBD, where it meets the M19 route (John Vorster Drive). It heads east-north-east, bypassing Centurion Mall before crossing the Hennops River on the north-western side of Centurion Lake and entering Die Hoewes, where it meets the M34 route (Jean Avenue). It continues east-north-east as Gerhard Street, then Station Street, to reach its end at a t-junction with the M18 route (Botha Avenue) in Lyttelton Manor adjacent to the Centurion Railway Station.
