= M26 (Pretoria) =

Road in Pretoria, South Africa

Metropolitan route M26

Route information
- Maintained by City of Tshwane Metropolitan Municipality
- Length: 14.1 km (8.8 mi)

Major junctions
- South-west end: R511 near Diepsloot
- North-east end: R55 in Claudius

Location
- Country: South Africa

Highway system
- Numbered routes of South Africa
← M25	→ M27

The M26 road is a metropolitan route in the City of Tshwane in Gauteng, South Africa. It is in the city of Centurion, connecting the R511 north of Diepsloot with Claudius via Erasmia.

== Route ==
The M26 route begins at a junction with the R511 route approximately 4 kilometres north of Diepsloot. It heads north-east for 12 kilometres to cross the Hennops River and enter the suburb of Erasmia. It proceeds north-east for 2 kilometres to end at a junction with the R55 route (Quagga Road) in Claudius.
