= M31 (Pretoria) =

Road in Pretoria, South Africa

Metropolitan route M31

Route information
- Maintained by City of Tshwane Metropolitan Municipality
- Length: 17 km (11 mi)

Major junctions
- East end: R50 near Moreleta Park
- M57 near Rietvlei Nature Reserve; R21 in Irene; M28 in Irene; M18 in Irene; M19 in Highveld; M36 near Highveld; R101 in Rooihuiskraal

- West end: M37 at Rooihuiskraal

Location
- Country: South Africa
- Provinces: Gauteng
- Major cities: City of Tshwane

Highway system
- Numbered routes of South Africa
← M30	→ M33

The M31 road is a metropolitan route in the City of Tshwane in Gauteng, South Africa. It connects the southern suburbs of Centurion, from the Rietvlei Nature Reserve to Rooihuiskraal via Irene and Highveld.

== Route ==
The M31 route begins just south-west of the Moreleta Park suburb in southern Pretoria, at a junction with the R50 route (Delmas Road). It begins by heading south-west for 4.5 kilometres, forming the northern border of the Rietvlei Nature Reserve and bypassing the Rietvlei Dam, to reach a junction with the M57 route (Goedehoop Avenue). It proceeds westwards as Nellmapius Drive to cross the R21 highway and enter the southern suburbs of Centurion. It enters the Irene Village and reaches the Irene Village Mall just after the R21 interchange, where it meets the southern terminus of the M28 route (Van Ryneveld Avenue).

The M31 proceeds westwards to reach a junction with the M18 route (Main Road) in Irene before crossing the Hennops River south of the Centurion Country Club and entering the Highveld suburb, where it meets the southern terminus of the M19 route (John Vorster Drive, which connects to the Centurion CBD). Still named Nellmapius Drive, the M31 proceeds westwards from Highveld to meet the M36 route before flying over the N1 highway (Ben Schoeman Freeway) and entering the Rooihuiskraal suburb.

Just after the N1 overbridge, the M31 reaches a junction with the R101 route (Old Johannesburg Road). It proceeds westwards through Rooihuiskraal as Uitsig Drive for 2 kilometres to reach its end at a junction with the M37 route (Rooihuiskraal Road).
