= M28 (Pretoria) =

Road in Pretoria, South Africa

Metropolitan route M28

Route information
- Maintained by City of Tshwane Metropolitan Municipality
- Length: 6.2 km (3.9 mi)

Major junctions
- South end: M31 in Irene
- M27 near Pierre van Ryneveld Park
- North end: M10 near Monument Park

Location
- Country: South Africa

Highway system
- Numbered routes of South Africa
← M27	→ M29

The M28 road is a metropolitan route in the City of Tshwane in Gauteng, South Africa. It connects Irene with Monument Park via Pierre van Ryneveld Park. For its entire route, it is named Van Ryneveld Avenue.

== Route ==
The M28 route starts at a junction with the M31 route (Nellmapius Drive) in Irene, adjacent to the Irene Village Mall. It heads northwards as Van Ryneveld Avenue to pass through the suburb of Pierre van Ryneveld Park before passing under the N1 highway (Danie Joubert Freeway; Pretoria Eastern Bypass) and reaching a junction with the eastern terminus of the M27 route (Theron Street). It continues northwards, passing to the east of the Air Force Base Waterkloof, to pass under the R21 highway and reach its end at a junction with the M10 route (Solomon Mahlangu Drive) just south of Monument Park.
