= M37 (Pretoria) =

Road in Pretoria, South Africa

Metropolitan route M37

Route information
- Maintained by City of Tshwane Metropolitan Municipality
- Length: 11 km (6.8 mi)

Major junctions
- North end: R114 in Wierdapark
- M25 in Wierdapark; M27 in Rooihuiskraal North; M31 in Rooihuiskraal M36 in Kosmosdal
- South end: R562 in Midrand

Location
- Country: South Africa

Highway system
- Numbered routes of South Africa
← M36	→ M39

The M37 road is a short metropolitan route in the City of Tshwane in Gauteng, South Africa. It is in the city of Centurion, connecting Wierdapark with the Noordwyk suburb of Midrand via Rooihuiskraal and The Reeds. For much of its route, it is named Rooihuiskraal Road.

== Route ==
The M37 begins in Wierdapark, at a junction with the R114 route (Ruimte Road). It begins by heading southwards as Rooihuiskraal Road to meet the western terminus of the M25 route (Hendrik Verwoerd Drive; which connects to the Centurion CBD) and form the boundary between Amberfield to the west and Rooihuiskraal North to the east. It meets the western terminus of the M27 route (Theus van Niekerk Street) and passes by the Rooihuiskraal Historical Terrain before flying over the N14 highway and entering Rooihuiskraal.

Still named Rooihuiskraal Road, it passes in-between Rooihuiskraal and The Reeds, where it meets the western terminus of the M31 route (Uitsig Drive). It passes through the southern part of The Reeds before entering Kosmosdal, where the M37 meets the south-western terminus of the M36 route (Samrand Avenue). It continues southwards as Rooihuiskraal Road, then as Lever Road, to enter Midrand in the City of Johannesburg Metropolitan Municipality, where it ends at a junction with the R562 route (Summit Road) in the Noordwyk suburb.
