= M19 (Pretoria) =

Road in Pretoria, South Africa

Metropolitan route M19

Route information
- Maintained by City of Tshwane Metropolitan Municipality
- Length: 8.3 km (5.2 mi)

Major junctions
- North end: M18 in Lyttelton Manor
- M34 in Lyttelton Manor; M25 in Centurion CBD; M27 in Centurion CBD; N1 near Centurion CBD M36 in Highveld
- South end: M31 in Highveld

Location
- Country: South Africa

Highway system
- Numbered routes of South Africa
← M18	→ M20

The M19 road is a short metropolitan route in the City of Tshwane in Gauteng, South Africa. It is in the city of Centurion, connecting Lyttelton with Highveld via the Centurion CBD.

== Route ==
The M19 begins in Lyttelton Manor, at a junction with the M18 route (Botha Avenue). It begins by heading south-west as Cantonments Road, then as Rabie Street, meeting the M34 route (Jean Avenue) adjacent to the Jean Crossing Mall, to enter the Centurion CBD, where it crosses the Hennops River, bends to the south and becomes John Vorster Drive.

The M19 reaches a junction with the M25 route (Hendrik Verwoerd Drive) and continues south-south-east as a dual carriageway (John Vorster Drive). It meets the M27 route (Lenchen Avenue) and passes through the eastern part of Zwartkop before crossing the N1 highway (Danie Joubert Freeway; Pretoria Eastern Bypass). It proceeds to meet the M36 route (Olievenhoutbosch Avenue) before separating the Highveld suburb in the west from the Centurion Country Club in the east and reaching its end at a junction with the M31 route (Nellmapius Drive) just north of the Southdowns Residential Estate.
