= Yusuf Abramjee =

South African journalist and activist

- Born: 1963 or 1964 (age 62–63); Lady Selborne, Pretoria, South Africa
- Occupations: Journalist and activist

Yusuf Abramjee GCOB is a South African journalist and anti-crime activist. He has won numerous awards for his journalism, and activism, and serves as a social cohesion ambassador for the South African government.

== Biography ==
=== Early life and education ===
Yusuf Abramjee was born and grew up in Lady Selborne, an area north west of the Pretoria CBD. Abramjee's father Ebrahim "Boetie" Abramjee later served in the House of Delegates as an MP. Abramjee's family was the last to leave Lady Selborne, in 1984, as a consequence of the Group Areas Act, moving to Laudium, an Indian township in Pretoria.

Abramjee attended Laudium Secondary School, where he edited the school paper, matriculating in 1982, and then studied at the Transvaal College of Education, a teacher's training college Laudium.

=== Career ===
After graduating in 1985, Abramjee taught Afrikaans at Laudium Secondary School, before taking a job with the House of Delegates as a spokesman, and then joining the SABC. He later owned and edited a local newspaper, the Laudium Sun.

Abramjee freelanced for Radio 702 ahead of South Africa's first non-racial election in 1994. He joined 702 on a permanent basis as a crime reporter in 1995, becoming crime editor in 1996 for Radio 702 and 567 Cape Talk, another station owned by Primedia. He won several awards for his reporting, and was eventually promoted to station manager of 702, before becoming Primedia's head of news and talk programming. He was chairman of the National Press Club on a few occasions.

Among his many accolades, Abramjee added a feather to his cap when he became the first non-white person to be elected chairman of the National Press Club (NPC) in its 22-year history. He was re-elected chairman in July 2001 and in May 2002. He took over the reins at the NPC again from 2010 to 2012. Abramjee was also a member of the South African National Editors’ Forum (Sanef). To top his journalism, career he took the salute from the National Ceremonial Guard in May 2001 at Church Square, Pretoria for his contributions to the media.

=== Activism ===
Abramjee was a founder of Crime Line in South Africa, a crime tip-off line, in collaboration with the government. He was a prominent opponent of South Africa's "Secrecy Bill". He helped found LeadSA, which "aims to celebrate efforts of ordinary South Africans to do good". He was reappointed as a social cohesion ambassador by the Arts and Culture Minister in 2019. He also helped coordinate private relief efforts during the COVID-19 pandemic.

=== Illicit tobacco trading ===
Since 2019, Abramjee has been exposing the illicit tobacco trading and criminal networks in South Africa. Gold Leaf Tobacco Corporation filled a 50 million rand lawsuit in 2019 following his criticism and failed.

In July 2026, Abramjee was mentioned at the Madlanga Commission through WhatsApp chats between suspended Crime Intelligence boss Major-General Feroz Khan and businessesman Mohammed "Mo" Sayed. The threatening and vulgar texts directed at him, forms part of evidence being examined by the commission investigating allegations of corruption, criminal infiltration, and misconduct within South Africa's law enforcement structures.

=== Personal life ===
Abramjee is married, with two adult sons, and lives in Erasmia.

== Criticism ==
Abramjee was accused of self-promotion in 2015 by journalist, and former editor of the Cape Times, Ryland Fisher, who nonetheless described Abramjee as a patriot. Fisher was responding to a controversy involving Abramjee when he penned an open letter to then-president Jacob Zuma, calling for the government to act on the crime problem in South Africa.

== Honours, decorations, awards and distinctions ==
- Order of the Baobab, 2014
