= M36 (Pretoria) =

Road in Pretoria, South Africa

Metropolitan route M36

Route information
- Maintained by City of Tshwane Metropolitan Municipality
- Length: 13.3 km (8.3 mi)

Major junctions
- North-east end: M18 in Irene
- M34 in Irene; M19 in Hiighveld; M31 near Highveld; R101 in near Brakfontein; N1 in Kosmosdal

- South-west end: M37 in Kosmosdal

Location
- Country: South Africa

Highway system
- Numbered routes of South Africa
← M35	→ M37

The M36 road is a metropolitan route in the City of Tshwane in Gauteng, South Africa. It is in the city of Centurion, connecting Irene with Kosmosdal via Highveld.

== Route ==
The M36 begins in Irene, at a junction with the M18 route (Botha Avenue). It begins by heading westwards as Alexandra Road to meet the south-eastern terminus of the M34 route (Jean Avenue), where it becomes Olievenhoutbosch Avenue. It continues west-south-west, passing north of the Centurion Country Club, to reach a junction with the M19 route (John Vorster Drive) and enter the suburb of Highveld.

The M36 continues west-south-west, through Highveld and the Eco-Park Estate, to reach a junction with the M31 route (Nellmapius Drive), where it turns to the south. It parallels the N1 highway (Ben Schoeman Highway) for 4.5 kilometres as Olievenhoutbosch Avenue before turning to the west to cross the R101 route (Old Johannesburg Road) and the N1 highway as Samrand Avenue. From the N1 interchange, it heads westwards to enter the suburb of Kosmosdal, where it ends at a junction with the M37 route (Rooihuiskraal Road).
