= Hoërskool Eldoraigne =

Public school in Gauteng, South Africa

Coordinates: 25.843°S 28.147°E

Location
- 26 Christopher Street, Eldoraigne; Centurion, Gauteng; South Africa

Information
- School type: Public
- Motto: Vervul jou roeping (Fulfill your calling)
- Religious affiliation: Christianity
- Established: 1974; 52 years ago
- School number: +27 (012) 660 2066
- Headmaster: Retief Smith
- Staff: 100 full-time
- Grades: 8–12
- Gender: Boys & Girls
- Age: 14 to 18
- Enrollment: 1,300 pupils
- Language: Afrikaans
- Schedule: 07:20 - 14:00
- Campus: Urban
- Campus type: Suburban
- Colours: Green; White
- Nickname: Eldo's
- Rivals: Die Hoërskool Menlopark; Hoërskool Zwartkop; Sutherland High School
- Accreditation: Gauteng Department of Education
- Newspaper: The Eldo Info
- School fees: R41,800 (tuition)
- Feeder schools: Laerskool Bakenkop; Laerskool Hennopspark; Laerskool Wierdapark; Laerskool Swartkop; Laerskool Rooihuiskraal; Laerskool Hennopspark; Laerskool Louis Leypoldt
- Website: http://www.hseldo.co.za

Hoërskool Eldoraigne is a public Afrikaans medium co-educational high school situated in the suburb of Eldoraigne in Centurion in the Gauteng province of South Africa. It is one of the most academic schools in Gauteng and its learners are known as Eldo's.

== History ==
Situated on the corner of Christopher street and Dordrecht street, Eldoraigne was founded in 1974 as an Afrikaans secondary school. The first principal was Mr G. Visagie, previously vice-principal at Hoërskool Menlopark.

=== Frank Roos ===
Mr Frank Roos became the headmaster in 1996 and served in that position up to his retirement, 19 years later. Roos was formerly a teacher at HTS Witbank (1973-), department head at Hoërskool Ben Viljoen in Groblersdal, vice principal at Hoërskool Verwoerdburg (current Hoërskool Centurion), and senior vice principal at Hoërskool Gerhard Maritz. Mr Roos majored in Entomology as student, and Biology remained his favourite subject subsequently. He was a writer of text books for the Education Department, served on its biology research committee, and served as head examinator for the National Education Department. Mr Roos was succeeded in 2015 by Dr Anton Prinsloo.

=== Dr Anton Prinsloo ===
At the time of his appointment Prinsloo expressed the hope that the school's brand could be improved from "fifth" to first place nationally, but his tenure was noted for heightened tensions and a very high turnover of staff. Prinsloo was previously a teacher at Hoërskool Vorentoe (87-88) and Hoërskool Helpmekaar (89-), before he served as vice principal at Hoërskool Riebeekrand and Hoërskool Noordheuwel (-98) respectively. By 1997 he had obtained his M.Ed. and D.Ed. from RAU, and was headmaster at Hoërskool Bastion from 1998 to 2014.

In April 2018 an Eldoraigne pupil paid Hoërskool Waterkloof a visit, intending to ask a Waterkloof girl to his prom dance. The visit however devolved into a scuffle between the boy and two of Waterkloof's staff members, and Prinsloo's office subsequently informed the media that the boy was "not enrolled at the school since the incident". In 2021 the Gauteng Education Department temporarily relieved Prinsloo of his duties at Eldoraigne, after fellow staff accused him of victimization and bullying, and some parents allegedly signed a petition to remove him. His deputy, Mr Dave du Plessis, was appointed as acting principal during his three months long absence.

When the department moved to charge Prinsloo with misconduct, his accusers however decided to "stand their ground" by refusing to testify in a disciplinary hearing. The department consequently dismissed their complaints, and reinstated Prinsloo in his former position. Prinsloo resumed his duties on August, 17th, and claimed that he was inundated with messages in support. A week later some 40 parents and pupils however gathered to hand over a petition to the South African Teachers' Union (SAOU) which was signed by hundreds of respondents. They expressed their concern and dissatisfaction with Prinsloo's return, and the impact they believed it would have on staff and pupils. The school's governing body indicated that it was reserving its options, before the department relented and once again recalled Prinsloo. Prinsloo was cleared of misconduct after a disciplinary hearing in 2022, but not immediately reinstated. His lawyer commented that the accusations were preposterous and devoid of truth.

=== National history ===
SA Schools Rugby

- Deon Schürmann- 1984

=== Provincial history ===
Blue Bulls Rugby Union invites:

- 10 learners in 2007
- 5 learners in 2008
- 4 learners in 2009
- 3 learners in 2010

== Headmasters ==
The headmasters (up to 2021) were:

Name	Started	Finished
Mr Frank Roos	1996	2015
Dr Anton Hugo (Dok) Prinsloo	2015	2021
Mr Dave du Plessis	2021	
Dr Anton Hugo (Dok) Prinsloo	2021	2025
Mr Retief Smith	2025	present

== Communication ==
Eldoraigne has a weekly newsletter called Eldo Info which contains the school's highlights of the week. It also contains a letter for the students written by the principal, invitations to social events, weekly sports results, upcoming sport matches, and opportunity for extra tutoring classes.

== Sport ==
Hoërskool Eldoraigne encourages its students to take part in any form of sport they are interested in, although this doesn't count for extra credit. Types of sport done at the school include

- Athletics
- Chess
- Cricket
- Cross country
- e-Sports
- Golf
- Hockey
- Netball
- Rugby
- Sqaush
- Softball
- Swimming
- Table tennis
- Tennis

== Academics ==
Academic pass rates for grades 8 through 11 for the past ten years.

- 2004 - 98.2%
- 2005 - 98.2%
- 2006 - 98.2%
- 2007 - 98.1%
- 2008 - 98.1%
- 2009 - 97.9%
- 2010 - 98.1%
- 2011 - 98.5%
- 2012 - 98.7%
- 2013 - 96.6%

The pass rates for matric has been 100% for the first 9 years and 99.68% for 2013. Matric pass rates:

- 2016 - 100%
- 2017 - 100%
- 2018 - 100%

== Events ==
Hoërskool Eldoraigne has multiple cultural events learners can participate in including

- Eldo Idols
- Drama
- Singing
- Dancing
- Music
- Art
- Choir
- Carnivals

Facilities include:

- Laboratory
- IT labs
- La Doraigne Restaurant
- Gymnasium
- Sports fields
- Music centres
- Cricket Academy
- Astro Hockey field
- Drama Theatres
- Dance Theatres
- Elektronika laboratoriums

== Notable alumni ==
List of Hoërskool Eldoraigne matriculants are in alphabetical order:

- Pierre Joubert (Class of 1996), South African professional cricketer
- Robbie Coetzee (Class of 2007), South African professional rugby player
- Stephan Lewies (Class of 2010), South African professional rugby player
- Natasha Joubert (Class of 2015), South African model and Miss South Africa 2023
- Mornay Smith (Class of 2016), South African rugby player
- Shayne Bolton (Class of 2018), South African professional rugby player
