= Woman Against Rape =

- Founded: 2000
- Founder: Janine Rowley
- Type: Non-governmental Organisation
- Purpose: Women's Rights
- Location: Johannesburg, Gauteng, South Africa
- Region served: South Africa
- Method: Sexual Assault Rehabilitation and Prevention
- Key people: Janine Rowley,
- Website: womanagainstrape.co.za

Woman Against Rape is a registered non-governmental organisation based out of Johannesburg, South Africa. The organisation operates throughout South Africa, with the main centers being in Johannesburg and Cape Town. Woman Against Rape or "W.A.R." focuses on the rehabilitation of sexual assault survivors through the distribution of "comfort packs" throughout the country, as well as raising awareness about the issues of sexual assault across South Africa.

== History ==
Woman Against Rape was founded in March 2000 by Janine Rowley, a former runway model turned activist who began to focus on the issues of rape and sexual assault after experiencing them herself. The organisation began by delivering "comfort packs" to rape survivors at local police stations around Pretoria, South Africa. The organisation has rehabilitation and awareness operations throughout the country. Rowley has been honored with a Paul P. Harris Award for her work and contribution.

== Outreach Efforts ==
=== Comfort Packs ===
W.A.R. focuses on the immediate rehabilitation aspect of sexual assault with the delivery of "Comfort Packs" to South African Police Stations. These packs are distributed to women and girls upon arrival at a partner police station after experiencing a sexual assault. The packs contain clean underwear, sanitary towels, various toiletries, a teddy bear and a chocolate; and are intended to help instill a sense of self-worth back into the survivor.

=== Awareness ===
Another aspect of W.A.R.'s missions is to raise awareness about the frequency of sexual assault and rape in South Africa. Speaking in local communities throughout South Africa such as churches, schools, the South African Business Woman’s Association, Ambassadors Club and Constantia Woman’s Club. The organisation aims to create awareness surrounding this ever-increasing rate of sexually based crimes, as well as providing practical strategies on how to best avoid dangerous situations.

=== Trauma Centers ===
W.A.R. works directly with trauma centers in Laudium, Wolmer, and Tshwane, South Africa . W.A.R. directs rape survivors to their nearest trauma center and works closesly with each center to provide comfort packs, as well as scheduling regular "up-liftment programs" where they work to rehabilitate the women living in the centers.

== Partnerships ==
=== Kuros! ===
In 2015, W.A.R. partnered with Kuros! to become an official Kuros! partner in South Africa. Kuros! is a conscious business based in Austin, Texas that partners with non-governmental organisations to provide pepper spray to women in developing countries around the world. Through their partnership with W.A.R. they provide and distribute pepper spray to women throughout South Africa who do not have access to it for self-defense.
