= Cornwall Hill =

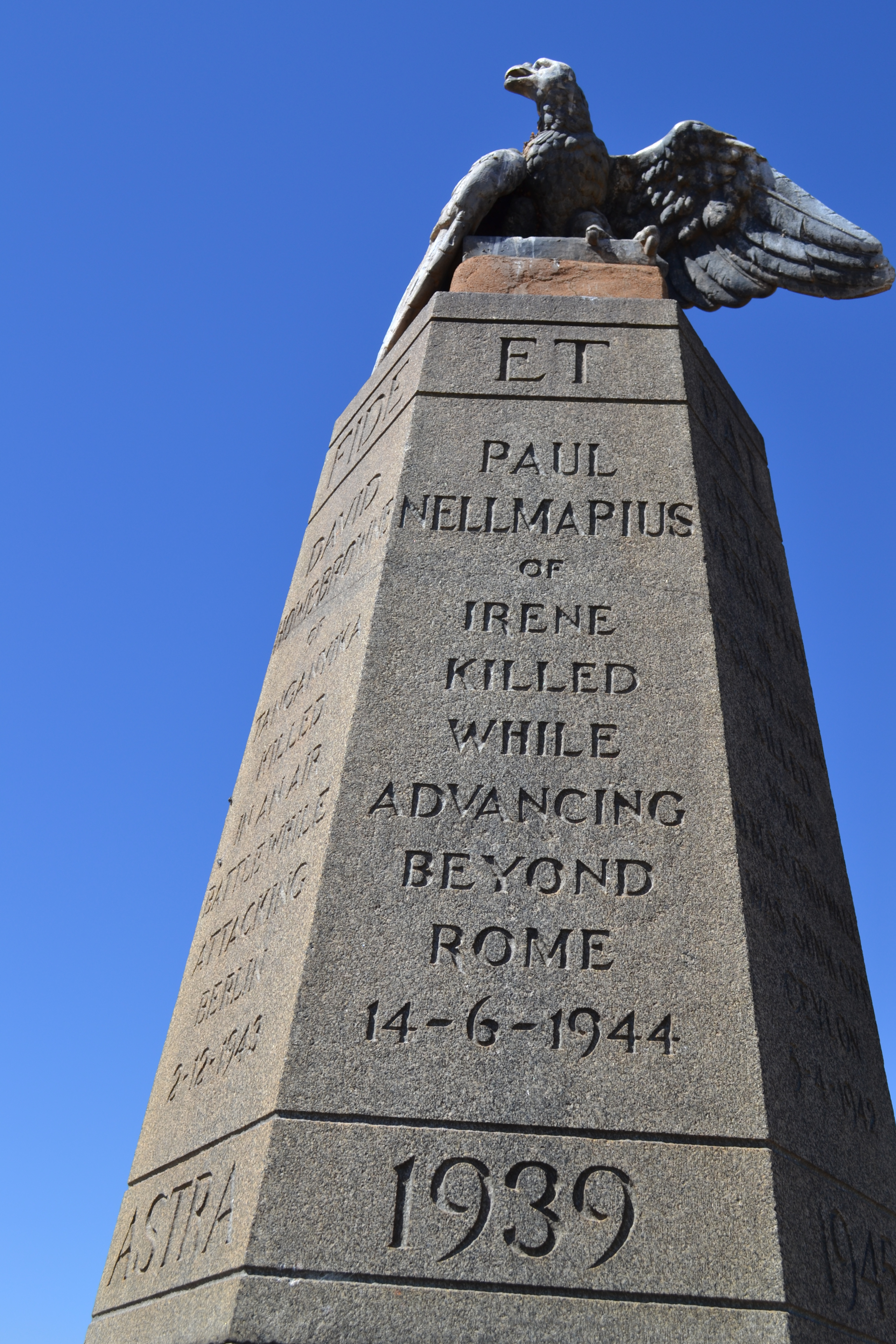
- Cornwall Hill Military Memorial to the fallen.

- Location within Gauteng Location within South Africa
- Coordinates: 25°52′34″S 28°14′22″E
- Country: South Africa
- Province: Gauteng
- Municipality: City of Tshwane
- Main Place: Centurion
- Established: 1998

Area
  - Total: 2.30 km^{2} (0.89 sq mi)

Population (2011)
  - Total: 628
  - Density: 273/km^{2} (707/sq mi)

Racial makeup (2011)
  - Black African: 30.10%
  - Coloured: 0.96%
  - Indian/Asian: 1.43%
  - White: 67.52%

First languages (2011)
  - English: 44.75%
  - Afrikaans: 40.13%
  - Sotho: 3.03%
  - Tswana: 2.39%
  - other: 9.7%
- Time zone: UTC+2 (SAST)
- Postal code (street): 0157
- PO box: 0178

Cornwall Hill is a small suburb south of Pretoria, Gauteng, South Africa, It borders the suburb of Irene. Cornwall Hill takes its name from the Duke of Cornwall's Light Infantry brigade that was stationed here during the Anglo-Boer war.

== Anglo-Boer War ==
During the Anglo-Boer War, at the time of the British occupation of Pretoria, over a thousand Mounted Infantry, two companies of the 2nd Duke of Cornwall's Light Infantry and 350 Northumberland Fusiliers guarded the section of railway line at Irene. Cornwall Hill takes its name from the Duke of Cornwall's Light Infantry brigade. These Cornish men, camped on the western slopes of the highest hill in the vicinity of the Irene Station, built a rough stone fort to protect the railway line linking Johannesburg to Pretoria, and thus the hill became known as Cornwall Hill.

== World War II Monument ==
A memorial was erected on Cornwall Hill to fallen members of the South African Air Force of the Union Defence Force who died during the Second World War. It consists of an obelisk with a bronze eagle on top. The memorial contains the following inscriptions:

- "Paul Nellmapius of Irene killed while advancing past Rome 15-6-1944"
- "Peter Versveld of Constantia killed when H.M.S. Cornwall was sunk off Ceylon 5-4-1942"
- "Andrew Duncan of Pretoria killed in an air battle over Libya 31-5-1942"
- "Ulrich van Rooyen van Worcester gesneuweld in 'n lugaanval teen Ploesti 26-7-1944"
- "David Howe-Browne of Tanganyika killed in an air battle while attacking Berlin 2-12-1943"
