= Jacqueline Mofokeng =

South African politician (1959–2021)

Member of the National Assembly of South Africa
- In office 22 May 2019 – 22 April 2021

Member of the Gauteng Provincial Legislature
- In office 1999–2019

Personal details
- Born: 25 October 1959
- Died: 22 April 2021 (aged 61) Irene, Gauteng, South Africa
- Party: African National Congress
- Spouse: Dan Mofokeng
- Children: 1
- Education: Institute of Vocational Studies; Union College; Credo Business College; Newport University; University of South Africa; Stellenbosch University; University of the Witwatersrand

Jacqueline Motlagomang Mofokeng (25 October 1959 – 22 April 2021) was a South African politician. A member of the African National Congress, she served in the Gauteng Provincial Legislature from 1999 to 2019. In the 2019 national elections, she was elected to the National Assembly of South Africa.

== Early life and education ==
Mofokeng was born on 25 October 1959. She participated in the 1976 youth uprisings. She earned a personnel management diploma at Union College and an advanced personnel management diploma at the Institute of Vocational Studies. She held a public relations practitioner diploma and was registered at the Public Relations Institute of South Africa.

She obtained a bachelor's degree in human behaviour at Newport University and achieved a Business Management Diploma from the Credo Business College in Pretoria. She also completed an advanced diploma in adult basic education and early childhood development training at the University of South Africa. From UNISA, she also earned a Bachelor of Education Honours specialising in adult basic education and a local government and administration certificate.

Mofokeng was a tutor at UNISA's Adult Institute under Professor Veronica McKay. She also achieved a project management and policy development certificate from Stellenbosch University. She completed a paralegal studies Certificate at the South African School of Paralegal Studies. At the time of her death, she was studying towards a master's degree in Development Studies. Mofokeng also did some media and communication short courses at the University of the Witwatersrand.

== Politics ==
A member of the African National Congress, she served on the provincial executive committee of the party's women league in Gauteng and was the PEC's spokesperson. She was regional chairperson and regional secretary of the ANC women's league in Tshwane.

She was a member of the ANC's regional executive and the first woman to be regional deputy chairperson of the ANC in Tshwane. Mofokeng also served on the provincial executive committee of the South African National Civic Organization in Gauteng. She was a member of the ANC's Bronkhorstspruit branch executive committee, serving as secretary and chairperson of the branch's women's league. At the time of her death in 2021, she was a branch executive committee member.

=== Gauteng Provincial Legislature ===
In 1999, Mofokeng was elected to the Gauteng Provincial Legislature as an ANC representative. She was then appointed chairperson of the oversight committee on the premier office and the legislature. After the 2004 election, she became chairperson of the community safety committee. Mofokeng was appointed deputy chief whip of the ANC caucus, chairperson of the women's caucus and chairperson of media and communication following the 2009 election. She was also named to the Rules Committee, the Members Affairs, the Political Office Bearers Fund and the Human Resource Committee. She served as chairperson of the Commonwealth Parliamentary Association in Gauteng from 2009 to 2014.

In the aftermath of the 2014 election, she was elected as chairperson of the Standing Committee on Scrutiny of Subordinate Legislation. Mofokeng was also appointed to serve as a member of the sports, arts and culture portfolio committee.

In her capacity as a member of the provincial legislature, she attended the trial of Oscar Pistorius to support the mother of Reeva Steenkamp, June Steenkamp.

=== Parliamentary career ===
Mofokeng stood as an ANC parliamentary candidate from Gauteng in the 2019 national elections, and was subsequently elected to the National Assembly and sworn in on 22 May 2019.

In parliament, she served on the Portfolio Committee on Justice and Correctional Services, the Joint Standing Committee on Intelligence, the Constitutional Review Committee, and the Portfolio Committee on Police. After the death of fellow ANC MP Hisamodien Mohamed in 2020, she took over as the whip of the Portfolio Committee on Justice and Correctional Services.

== Personal life ==
Mofokeng was married to Dan Mofokeng. They had one daughter, Thato. In 2012, Dan was put on trial after Mofokeng alleged that he had attacked her and threatened to kill their daughter. He was acquitted of the charges.

== Death ==
Mofokeng died due to COVID-19 complications at her home in Irene, Gauteng on 22 April 2021 during the COVID-19 pandemic in South Africa. Her death came a day after her daughter Thato had died from COVID-19. ANC chief whip Pemmy Majodina described Mofokeng as "an advocate and champion of women and children's rights".

== See also ==
- List of members of the National Assembly of South Africa who died in office
