= Dan Mofokeng =

South African politician

Member of the Gauteng Executive Council for Housing
- In office 1994–1999
- Premier: Tokyo Sexwale; Mathole Motshekga
- Preceded by: Position established
- Succeeded by: Paul Mashatile

Personal details
- Born: 27 January 1960
- Died: 28 April 2022 (aged 62) Johannesburg, South Africa
- Party: African National Congress
- Other political affiliations: South African Communist Party
- Spouse: Geraldine Nomasonto Mofokeng (divorced)

Dan Mofokeng (27 January 1960 – 28 April 2022) was a South African politician and businessman who was Gauteng's inaugural Member of the Executive Council for Housing from 1994 to 1999. He was a member of the African National Congress and rose to prominence during apartheid as a leader of the South African National Civic Organisation in the Transvaal. After he was dropped from the Gauteng Provincial Legislature in 1999, he pursued a career in business.

== Career ==
Mofokeng was born on 27 January 1960 and was from Katlehong in the former Transvaal. His father was a construction worker. After attending the University of the North at Turfloop, Mofokeng rose to prominence during apartheid as a regional leader of the South African National Civic Organisation. He joined the African National Congress (ANC) and South African Communist Party in the 1990s. Pursuant to South Africa's first democratic elections in 1994, he was appointed to the Executive Council of Gauteng by the province's inaugural Premier, Tokyo Sexwale; he remained in the office during the brief tenure of Sexwale's successor, Mathole Motshekga, from 1998. According to the Mail & Guardian, he was strongly aligned to Motshekga in the factionalism of the Gauteng ANC of the period. Mofokeng's tenure in the Housing portfolio was controversial and the ANC dropped him from its party list in the 1999 general election.

He later pursued a career in business. In March 2011, he and three others were arrested by the Hawks during a police investigation into the alleged abuse of the state-sponsored AgriBEE fund. R14-million had been transferred from the fund to a firm of attorneys, and an investigative report by the Sunday Times had claimed to uncover that the money was embezzled for the personal use of Mofokeng and his co-accused – according to the newspaper, Mofokeng bought a Mercedes-Benz and a R2-million house.

== Personal life and death ==
He was married to fellow ANC politician Jacqueline Mofokeng, In 2011, Mofokeng was charged in Pretoria's Domestic Violence Court in relation to an incident at their house in Irene, Pretoria in February 2010, while the couple were estranged and undertaking divorce proceedings. Jacqueline alleged that she had a protection order against him at the time, which she said he had contravened by storming into the house and physically assaulting her. He pled not guilty to assault and contravention of a protection order, after various other charges were dropped. Mofokeng was acquitted on 9 February 2012.

Both his ex-wife and his stepdaughter died in April 2021. He died on 28 April 2022 in a Johannesburg hospital at the age of 62.
