= Jody Kollapen =

Justice of the Constitutional Court of South Africa (born 1957)

The Honourable Jody Kollapen

Justice of the Constitutional Court
- Incumbent
- Assumed office 1 January 2022
- Appointed by: Cyril Ramaphosa

Judge of the High Court
- In office 11 May 2011 – 31 December 2021
- Appointed by: Jacob Zuma
- Division: Gauteng

Chairperson of the South African Human Rights Commission
- In office October 2002 – October 2009
- Appointed by: Thabo Mbeki
- Preceded by: Barney Pityana
- Succeeded by: Lawrence Mushwana

Personal details
- Born: Narandran Kollapen; 19 May 1957 (age 69) Lady Selborne, Pretoria; Union of South Africa
- Spouse: Rani Kollapen
- Children: 3
- Education: University of the Witwatersrand

Narandran "Jody" Kollapen (born 19 May 1957) is a South African judge who joined the Constitutional Court of South Africa on 1 January 2022. He was appointed to the apex court by President Cyril Ramaphosa after a decade of service in the High Court of South Africa. He is also a former chairperson of the South African Human Rights Commission.

Kollapen rose to prominence in the 1980s as a human rights lawyer in his hometown of Pretoria, especially as instructing attorney in several high-profile apartheid-era political trials. He served as the national director of Lawyers for Human Rights in 1995 and 1996, and thereafter he joined the Human Rights Commission as an ordinary member. On the appointment of President Thabo Mbeki, he went on to serve as the commission's second chairperson from October 2002 to October 2009. He was an acting High Court judge in 2010 and joined the bench in the Gauteng Division permanently in May 2011. Following two unsuccessful nominations to the Constitutional Court in 2017 and 2019, Ramaphosa announced his elevation on 24 December 2021.

== Early life and education ==
Kollapen was born on 19 May 1957 at the Holy Cross Health Care Centre in Lady Selborne, a suburb of Pretoria. The son of working-class Tamil South African parents, he was classified as Indian under apartheid. His family lived in Marabastad in central Pretoria until 1968, when he was 12 years old, at which time they were forcibly relocated under the Group Areas Act. They moved to Laudium, a recently established Indian township, which Kollapen later characterised as "the District 6 of Pretoria, with a mixed-race community, and in many ways a glorified slum".

Kollapen's father, Kanabathy "Billy" Kollapen, was a waiter, and his mother, Rajanbal "Thanga" Kollapen, was a machinist at a clothing factory. He later said that he inherited "a sense of justice" from his mother, who was twice jailed in Pietermaritzburg for participating in anti-apartheid passive resistance campaigns. She was pregnant with Kollapen in August 1956 when she attended the Women's March. Inspired by his mother and by his uncle – a "kind of paralegal" who, though lacking legal qualifications, provided legal advice to community members – Kollapen decided to pursue law as a teenager.

After matriculating at Laudium High School in 1974, he moved from the Transvaal to Natal to pursue a law degree at the University of Durban-Westville. At the outset of his third year of university study, the Extension of University Education Act was relaxed, providing non-white students with greater access to higher education institutions, and he was permitted to transfer to the University of the Witwatersrand in Johannesburg. He was a member of the Black Students Society and obtained a Baccalaureus Procurationis (BProc) in 1978 and an LLB in 1981.

== Legal career ==
After his graduation, Kollapen returned to Laudium and began his legal career as an articled clerk at the firm of Savage, Jooste and Adams in Pretoria. In 1982, he opened his own practice with only R200 capital, no secretary, and no car. During his subsequent decade in practice as an attorney, he often worked closely with Priscilla Jana, a prominent human rights lawyer. He appeared as counsel in high-profile human rights matters including the trial of the Sharpeville Six and the South African Medical and Dental Council's suit against the medical practitioners who failed to prevent Steve Biko's death in police custody.

He also became involved in the Political Prisoner Release programme of the non-profit Lawyers for Human Rights, in which capacity he was the instructing attorney in other famous political trials, including the Delmas Treason Trial. In 1991, he joined the permanent staff of Lawyers for Human Rights, and he became the organisation's national director in January 1995, succeeding Brian Currin; he held that position until the end of 1996.

In 1997, President Nelson Mandela appointed him as a member of the South African Human Rights Commission, where he served until 2009. For the last seven years of his tenure, he was the commission's chairperson, appointed to that position by Mandela's successor, President Thabo Mbeki, in October 2002. In January 2010, shortly after his departure from the commission, he accepted appointment as an acting judge in the Gauteng Division of the High Court of South Africa.

== Gauteng High Court: 2011–2022 ==
In 2011, President Jacob Zuma appointed Kollapen to the bench permanently as a judge of the Gauteng High Court. During his decade of service in the High Court, Kollapen also served as chairperson of the South African Law Reform Commission from April 2016, and he was an acting judge in the Constitutional Court of South Africa for two terms in 2017. He was an extraordinary lecturer at the University of Pretoria's Centre for Human Rights in 2011. He was also an acting judge in the Land Claims Court.

On two occasions, Kollapen was unsuccessfully nominated for permanent elevation to the Constitutional Court. Both in April 2017 and in April 2019, he was interviewed and endorsed by the Judicial Service Commission, but, on both occasions, the President opted to select another candidate (Leona Theron in 2017, and Zukisa Tshiqi and Steven Majiedt in 2019). In February 2021, the Judicial Service Commission shortlisted him for elevation for a third time, this time as one of ten candidates for two vacancies, and his third interview took place in April 2021. He was again recommended as suitable for elevation, but the results of the selection process were nullified following a challenge by the Council for the Advancement of the South African Constitution.

== Constitutional Court: 2022–present ==
In October 2021, the Judicial Service Commission re-ran its April 2021 interviews; commentator Eusebius McKaiser said that, despite offering "occasional stylised little soliloquies", Kollapen made a strong impression. The Judicial Service Commission again recommended the same five candidates, including Kollapen, for appointment to the Constitutional Court, and he and Rammaka Mathopo were the pair whom President Cyril Ramaphosa selected for appointment in December. They took office in the apex court on 1 January 2022.

== Personal life ==
He is married to Rani Kollapen and has three daughters. He inherited his parents' Hindu religion.
