= Sutherland High School, Centurion =

Coordinates: 25°50′29″S 28°08′36″E

Sutherland High School

Location
- 1333 Willem Botha Ave, Eldoraigne, Centurion, Gauteng; South Africa

Information
- Other name: Sutherland High School (Pty) Ltd.
- Type: Public School
- Motto: Ad astra Our school Our Pride (To the stars)
- Established: 1987; 39 years ago
- School number: 012 650 5880
- Principal: Mr Andre Van Der Merwe
- Staff: 50 full-time
- Grades: 8–12
- Gender: Boys & Girls
- Age: 14 to 18
- Enrollment: 1,200–1,500 pupils
- Language: English
- Schedule: 07:30 - 14:00
- Campus: Urban Campus
- Campus type: Suburban
- Houses: 8
- Colours: Blue; Red; White
- Nickname: Suthies
- Rival: Hoërskool Eldoraigne; Hoërskool Zwartkop
- Accreditation: Gauteng Department of Education
- Website: www.sutherlandhs.co.za

Sutherland High School is a public English medium co-educational high school situated in the suburb of Eldoraigne, Centurion in the Gauteng province of South Africa, It is one of the top academic schools in the Gauteng province. The school was established in 1987.

== School houses ==
Upon registration at Sutherland High School, students are divided among the following eight houses:

- Argyll
- Bays
- Cameron
- Dunrobin
- Freskin
- Lindley
- Roberts
- Seaforth

These houses compete in various sporting and cultural competitions throughout the year.

== Leadership programmes ==
The School of Leadership is a youth leadership development initiative.

=== Red blazer programme ===
Learners at Sutherland High School can sign up for the "Red Blazer" programme. The main characteristics of a red blazer recipient are respect, integrity and accountability.

=== Desert walk ===
Desert walk is the first event that the School of Leadership offered. Learners are expected to endure a walk through the desert through challenging physical activities and limited food and sleep.

== Sports activities ==
Sutherland High School is part of the Pretoria English Medium High School Athletics Association (PEMHSAA), and has won the association's inter-highschool events 20 consecutive times from 1991 to 2011.

The sports that are offered in the school are:

- Archery
- Athletics
- Chess
- Cricket
- Cross country
- Equestrian
- Golf
- Hockey
- Netball (Girls)
- Rugby (Boys)
- Shooting
- Football (soccer)
- Swimming
- Table tennis
- Tennis
- Water polo

== Notable alumni ==
- Gareth Cliff
- Nicole Flint, Miss South Africa 2009

== Accolades ==
In September 2011, the school set a world record for the most solved Rubik's Cubes in one hour: 711, exceeding the previous record of 300 in an hour. Five years later in 2016, this record was surpassed by nine students in India–2,454 in one hour.
