= Lady Selborne, Pretoria =

District in South Africa

Lady Selborne
- Location within Gauteng Location within South Africa
- Coordinates: 25°42′11″S 28°7′13″E
- Country: South Africa
- Province: Gauteng
- Time zone: UTC+2 (SAST)

Lady Selborne is a settlement located near Pretoria, in the province of Gauteng. It was established in 1905 as an area where anyone could buy and own land. As apartheid took hold the authorities eventually found a rationale for removing the residents and the houses were bulldozed in 1963.

In 2017 the place was being reformed and former residents were claiming reparation of their lands.

== History ==
Since 1905 Lady Selborne had been an area where the native people were allowed to legally own land. It was named for Maud Palmer, Countess of Selborne. The suburb was useful as it supplied cheap labour to Pretoria's white residents. In 1942 22,000 people were living there. However the area was too popular for the liking of the authorities, but they struggled to find a legal basis under the Group Areas Act for seizing the land as the residents had freehold properties. The last family to leave was in 1984. Lady Selborne was bulldozed away during the apartheid era in 1963.

The Restitution of Land Rights Act 22 became law in 1994 and this entitles former owners to reclaim their property. Reparations have seen some of the historic occupants reclaiming their land despite local opposition. Many however have taken compensation, as they lack the funds to build on the land.

In 2019, 150 people claimed that they were owners of property in the former town. They took the authorities to court demanding that they should each be allowed to buy a plot for 43,000 Rand. The judge ordered the court be adjourned for two months while the evidence associated with each of their cases could be tested.

== Notable residents ==
- Ebrahim "Boetie" Abramjee MP lived
- Yusuf Abramjee was born here in 1963/4
- Jody Kollapen, judge was born here on 19 May 1957
- William Frederick Nkomo practiced in Lady Selborne
- Seputla Sebogodi actor and singer was born here in 1962.
- Hannah Stanton was at the women's mission here before her arrest
- Lefifi Tladi, the artist and musician was born here in 1949.
