= Stephan Lewies =

South African rugby union player

- Full name: Joseph Stephanus Theuns Lewies
- Born: 27 January 1992 (age 34) Pretoria, South Africa
- Height: 1.98 m (6 ft 6 in)
- Weight: 113 kg (17 st 11 lb; 249 lb)
- School: Hoërskool Eldoraigne

Rugby union career
- Position(s): Lock, Flanker
- Current team: Harlequins
Youth career
- 2011–2013: Sharks
Senior career
Years	Team	Apps	(Points)
2012–2018	Sharks XV	5	(0)
2012–2016	Sharks (Currie Cup)	17	(5)
2014–2018	Sharks	63	(5)
2017–2018	Kamaishi Seawaves	9	(5)
2019	Lions	13	(5)
2019–present	Harlequins	80	(45)
- Correct as of 15 February 2025
International career
Years	Team	Apps	(Points)
2014	South Africa	1	(0)
2016	South Africa 'A'	1	(0)
2023	Barbarian F.C.	1	(0)
- Correct as of 28 April 2024

Joseph Stephanus Theuns Lewies (born 27 January 1992) is a South African rugby union player for the Harlequins in the Premiership in England. His regular position is lock.

== Career ==
=== Youth ===
He played for the Sharks U19 side in 2011 and for the Sharks U21s in 2012 and 2013, starting 33 matches for those sides.

=== Sharks ===
He was included in the Sharks XV Vodacom Cup side in 2012 and made a late substitute appearance in their match against the Boland Cavaliers in Malmesbury to make his first class debut. Another substitute appearance followed in the 2013 Vodacom Cup, this time in a home match against the Free State XV.

His Currie Cup debut came during the 2013 Currie Cup Premier Division season, when he started in their match against the Golden Lions. He remained in the side for the rest of the season, starting two matches in total and making three substitute appearances, including coming on in the Currie Cup final, where he contributed to the Sharks beating Western Province 33–19.

Lewies was also included in the Sharks squad for the 2014 Super Rugby season and made his debut in a 31–16 victory against the Bulls in Durban.

=== Harlequins ===
On 20 March 2019, Lewies would travel to England to join Harlequins in the Premiership Rugby from the 2019-20 season.

Ahead of the 2020-2021 season and with England international Chris Robshaw approaching the end of his career, Lewies was named club captain. He joined other club legends to have assumed the role including former World Player of the Year Keith Wood, Rugby World Cup winner Jason Leonard and former England Captain Will Carling.

He started in the Premiership final against Exeter on 26 June 2021 as Harlequins won the game 40-38 in the highest scoring Premiership final ever and went on to lift the trophy alongside 2nd captain Alex Dombrandt and departing Quins legend Mike Brown.

In April 2024, he captained Harlequins as they beat Glasgow Warriors to record their first ever knockout stage victory in the European Champions Cup. The following weekend he captained the side to their first ever Champions Cup semi-final beating Bordeaux Begles 42-41 away in the quarter finals. Lewies scored a try, prevented another one and got a try assist in 41-32 victory over league leaders Northampton Saints in the Big Summer Kick Off fixture hosted at Twickenham Stadium.

Ahead of the 2024-25 season he relinquished the captaincy after four years to Alex Dombrandt. In December 2024, he signed an extension to his contract with Harlequins to keep him at the club for at least a seventh season. During this time he revealed he had nearly retired from rugby the season prior after a sustaining a series of injuries. In February 2025, he scored his first try of season during a Premiership Cup against Saracens.

In January 2026, he signed for United Rugby Championship club the Sharks ahead of the following season.

=== International ===
After Bakkies Botha became unavailable and Flip van der Merwe got injured, Springbok coach Heyneke Meyer called up Lewies for the Test match against Scotland. Lewies made his test debut on 28 June 2014, replacing stand-in captain Victor Matfield in the 55–6 thump over Scotland in Port Elizabeth.

In 2016, Lewies was included in a South Africa 'A' squad that played a two-match series against a touring England Saxons team. He was named in the starting line-up for their first match in Bloemfontein, but ended on the losing side as the visitors ran out 32–24 winners.
