= Pierre van Ryneveld Park =

- Location within Gauteng Location within South Africa
- Coordinates: 25.841389°S 28.243611°E
- Country: South Africa
- Province: Gauteng
- Municipality: City of Tshwane
- Main Place: Centurion

Area
  - Total: 5.47 km^{2} (2.11 sq mi)

Population (2011)
  - Total: 12,083
  - Density: 2,210/km^{2} (5,720/sq mi)

Racial makeup (2011)
  - Black African: 15.4%
  - Coloured: 1.7%
  - Indian/Asian: 1.6%
  - White: 80.6%
  - Other: 0.7%

First languages (2011)
  - Afrikaans: 67.9%
  - English: 18.9%
  - Tswana: 2.4%
  - Northern Sotho: 2.2%
  - Other: 8.6%
- Time zone: UTC+2 (SAST)

Pierre van Ryneveld Park is a suburb of Centurion in Gauteng Province, South Africa. It is named after Sir Pierre van Ryneveld. It is bisected by the N1 freeway and is bordered by Pretoria's South Eastern suburbs Waterkloof Ridge, Elardus Park and Monument Park.
