= Kloofsig =

- Location within Gauteng Location within South Africa
- Coordinates: 25.8131°S 28.2050°E
- Country: South Africa
- Province: Gauteng
- Municipality: City of Tshwane

Area
  - Total: 0.29 km^{2} (0.11 sq mi)

Population (2011)
  - Total: 863
  - Density: 3,000/km^{2} (7,700/sq mi)

Racial makeup (2011)
  - Black African: 11.6%
  - Coloured: 1.0%
  - Indian/Asian: 1.4%
  - White: 84.7%
  - Other: 1.3%

First languages (2011)
  - Afrikaans: 74.5%
  - English: 16.5%
  - Tswana: 1.7%
  - Northern Sotho: 1.4%
  - Other: %
- Time zone: UTC+2 (SAST)
- Postal code (street): 0157
- Area code: 012

Kloofsig is one of the northernmost suburbs of Centurion in Gauteng Province, South Africa, bordering the city of Pretoria.
