= Clubview =

- Location within Gauteng Location within South Africa
- Coordinates: 25.8386°S 28.1739°E
- Country: South Africa
- Province: Gauteng
- Municipality: City of Tshwane
- Main Place: Centurion

Area
  - Total: 4.33 km^{2} (1.67 sq mi)

Population (2011)
  - Total: 5,985
  - Density: 1,380/km^{2} (3,580/sq mi)

Racial makeup (2011)
  - Black African: 15.5%
  - Coloured: 1.7%
  - Indian/Asian: 2.9%
  - White: 78.8%
  - Other: 1.1%

First languages (2011)
  - Afrikaans: 64.3%
  - English: 22.7%
  - Tswana: 2.0%
  - Northern Sotho: 1.8%
  - other: 9.2%
- Time zone: UTC+2 (SAST)
- Postal code (street): 0157
- PO box: 0178

Clubview is a small residential suburb in Centurion, Gauteng, South Africa.
