= Zwartkop =

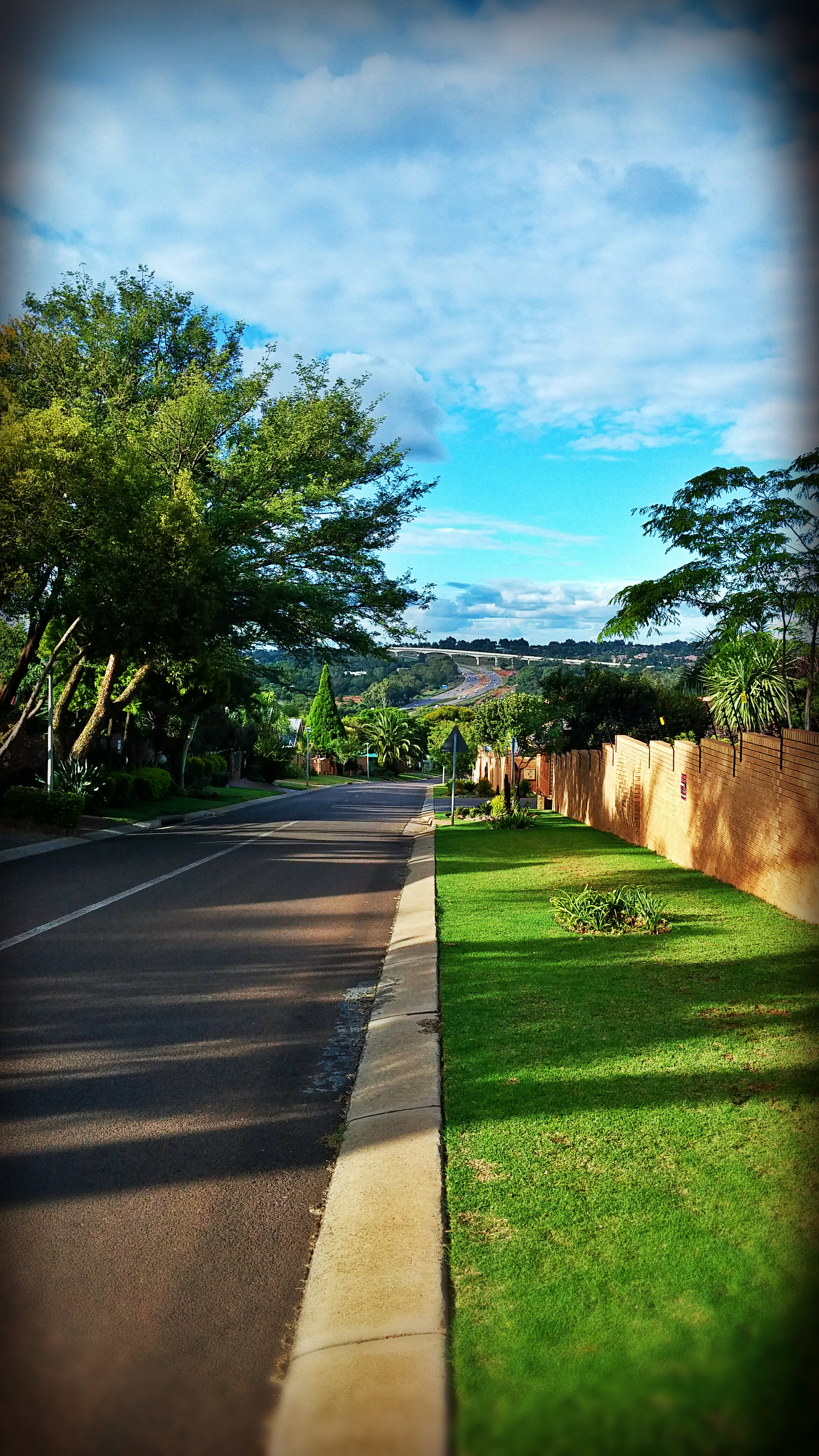
- A view from Duiker Ave in Zwartkop

- Location within Gauteng Location within South Africa
- Coordinates: 25.8677°S 28.1780°E
- Country: South Africa
- Province: Gauteng
- Municipality: City of Tshwane
- Main Place: Centurion

Area
  - Total: 3.74 km^{2} (1.44 sq mi)

Population (2011)
  - Total: 8,568
  - Density: 2,290/km^{2} (5,930/sq mi)

Racial makeup (2011)
  - Black African: 25.4%
  - Coloured: 2.6%
  - Indian/Asian: 5.3%
  - White: 65.8%
  - Other: 0.9%

First languages (2011)
  - Afrikaans: 56.4%
  - English: 23.4%
  - Tswana: 3.6%
  - Zulu: 1.9%
  - Other: 14.7%
- Time zone: UTC+2 (SAST)
- Postal code (street): 0157
- PO box: 0051

Zwartkop is a residential suburb next to Centurion lake in Centurion, South Africa. Historically the suburb was part of the town of Centurion. The suburb is located on a cluster of hills south-west of the Centurion lake. The suburb contains multiple security areas which have been closed off and is monitored by independent security companies. All residential properties in Zwartkop remains free-standing houses with the exception of Zwartkop Extension 7 which has multiple apartments and town-house complexes.

There is a large shopping complex in the suburb called Centurion gate which can be found on the corner of the N1 highway and the M19 metropolitan road (John Vorster Drive). The headquarters for OUTsurance, a large well-known short term insurance company is located in the north of Zwartkop.

== History ==
A prominent family living in the area, the Erasmus family purchased the land in 1841 which is today the greater Centurion and three different farms were established. Daniel Jacobus Erasmus settled on the farm Zwartkop, Daniel Elardus Erasmus on the farm Doornkloof and Rasmus Elardus Erasmus developed the farm Brakfontein. Several of the suburbs like Erasmia, Elardus Park, Zwartkop and Doornkloof were named after the original owners of the land and their properties. The suburb of Zwartkop lies within the boundaries of the original farm by the same name.

== Transport ==
Zwartkop is bordered by both the N1 and N14 highways allowing quick access by car. The suburb is also serviced by Gautrain bus feeder routes (C2 as well as C3 runs through the suburb).
