= Wierdapark =

- Location within Gauteng Location within South Africa
- Coordinates: 25.8605°S 28.1445°E
- Country: South Africa
- Province: Gauteng
- Municipality: City of Tshwane
- Main Place: Centurion

Area
  - Total: 9.47 km^{2} (3.66 sq mi)

Population (2011)
  - Total: 6,348
  - Density: 670/km^{2} (1,740/sq mi)

Racial makeup (2011)
  - Black African: 13,49%
  - Coloured: 1.37%
  - Indian/Asian: 3.75%
  - White: 82.37%

First languages (2011)
  - Afrikaans: 70.45%
  - English: 19.05%
  - Northern Sotho: 2.14%
- Time zone: UTC+2 (SAST)
- Postal code (street): 0157
- PO box: 0149

Wierdapark is a suburb of Centurion, Gauteng, near Pretoria, and is located in the province of Gauteng, South Africa.

== History ==
Wierdapark was named after the chief architect of the Transvaal Republic, Sytze Wopkes Wierda, who engineered the Wierda Bridge. The area in which the suburb is located was once part of a farm known as Cyferfontein.
