= Doringkloof =

- Location within Gauteng Location within South Africa
- Coordinates: 25.8559°S 28.2115°E
- Country: South Africa
- Province: Gauteng
- Municipality: City of Tshwane
- Main Place: Centurion

Area
  - Total: 2.40 km^{2} (0.93 sq mi)

Population (2011)
  - Total: 4,901
  - Density: 2,040/km^{2} (5,290/sq mi)

Racial makeup (2011)
  - Black African: 16.5%
  - Coloured: 2.7%
  - Indian/Asian: 1.7%
  - White: 78.4%
  - Other: 0.7%

First languages (2011)
  - Afrikaans: 61.3%
  - English: 25.9%
  - Northern Sotho: 2.2%
  - Zulu: 1.9%
  - other: 8.7%
- Time zone: UTC+2 (SAST)
- Postal code (street): 0157
- PO box: 0157

Doringkloof is a residential suburb in Centurion, Gauteng, South Africa, just east of the CBD.
