= Monument Park, Pretoria =

Monument Park
- Location within Gauteng Location within South Africa Location within Africa
- Coordinates: 25°48′S 28°14′E
- Country: South Africa
- Province: Gauteng
- Municipality: City of Tshwane
- Main Place: Pretoria

Area
  - Total: 3.28 km^{2} (1.27 sq mi)

Population (2011)
  - Total: 5,692
  - Density: 1,740/km^{2} (4,490/sq mi)

Racial makeup (2011)
  - Black African: 19.1%
  - Coloured: 1.7%
  - Indian/Asian: 2.6%
  - White: 74.2%
  - Other: 2.4%

First languages (2011)
  - Afrikaans: 61.6%
  - English: 23.4%
  - Tswana: 2.8%
  - Northern Sotho: 2.6%
  - Other: 9.6%
- Time zone: UTC+2 (SAST)

Monument Park (Afrikaans: Monumentpark) is a suburb of Pretoria, South Africa. It is at the start of the R21 Highway.

== Education ==
Monument Park houses a primary school only as Laerskool Monumentpark as an Afrikaans speaking school.
