= Erasmia =

- Location within Gauteng Location within South Africa
- Coordinates: 25°48′51″S 28°5′35″E
- Country: South Africa
- Province: Gauteng
- Municipality: City of Tshwane
- Established: 26 January 2019

Area
  - Total: 2.93 km^{2} (1.13 sq mi)

Population (2011)
  - Total: 6,932
  - Density: 2,370/km^{2} (6,130/sq mi)

Racial makeup (2011)
  - Black African: 12.6%
  - Coloured: 1.8%
  - Indian/Asian: 77.0%
  - White: 7.0%
  - Other: 1.6%

First languages (2011)
  - English: 75.3%
  - Afrikaans: 12.5%
  - Northern Sotho: 2.5%
  - Tswana: 1.2%
  - Other: 8.5%
- Time zone: UTC+2 (SAST)
- Postal code (street): 0183
- PO box: 0023

Erasmia is a suburb in the northern outskirts of Centurion in the City of Tshwane Metropolitan Municipality, South Africa. Originally a whites-only area under apartheid, increasing numbers of Indians from neighbouring Laudium moved in, following the abolition of segregation in the early 1990s, and the construction of a direct link road between the two areas. Erasmia lies west of the R55 route. In 2001, 65.72% of the population was Indian, and by 2011, Indians made up 77.03% of the population. The area called Christoburg is for census and other purposes usually treated as part of Erasmia.

== History ==
It became a suburb on 4 September 1946 and was named after WFE Erasmus. It was created out of the farms Mooiplaas No. 69 and Zwartkop No. 476.
