= Eldoraigne =

- Location within Gauteng Location within South Africa Location within Africa
- Coordinates: 25.8417°S 28.1593°E
- Country: South Africa
- Provinces: Gauteng
- Municipality: City of Tshwane
- Main Place: Centurion

Area
  - Total: 2.05 km^{2} (0.79 sq mi)

Population (2011)
  - Total: 3,647
  - Density: 1,780/km^{2} (4,610/sq mi)

Racial makeup (2011)
  - Black African: 12.9%
  - Coloured: 1.2%
  - Indian/Asian: 7.1%
  - White: 76.8%
  - Other: 1.6%

First languages (2011)
  - Afrikaans: 65.8%
  - English: 23.3%
  - Northern Sotho: 1.9%
  - Tswana: 1.7%
  - other: 8.5%
- Time zone: UTC+2 (SAST)
- Postal code (street): 0157
- PO box: 0171

Eldoraigne is a residential suburb east of Centurion, Gauteng, South Africa.
