= Laudium =

- Location within Gauteng Location within South Africa
- Coordinates: 25°47′17″S 28°06′24″E
- Country: South Africa
- Province: Gauteng
- Municipality: City of Tshwane
- Established: 1961

Area
  - Total: 6.07 km^{2} (2.34 sq mi)
- Elevation: 1,445 m (4,741 ft)

Population (2011)
  - Total: 19,102
  - Density: 3,150/km^{2} (8,150/sq mi)

Racial makeup (2011)
  - Black African: 16.1%
  - Coloured: 2.4%
  - Indian/Asian: 79.9%
  - White: 0.4%
  - Other: 1.1%

First languages (2011)
  - English: 77.4%
  - Afrikaans: 11.9%
  - Northern Sotho: 2.1%
  - S. Ndebele: 1.1%
  - Other: 7.4%
- Time zone: UTC+2 (SAST)
- Postal code (street): 0037
- PO box: 0037
- Area code: 12

Laudium (/ˈlɔːdiəm, ˈloʊ-/) is an Indian township southwest of central Pretoria, in the City of Tshwane Metropolitan Municipality. Claudius is a residential suburb that is effectively an extension of Laudium.

== History ==
Older aerial photographs show remains of circular type dwellings to the west of Laudium, built by its earliest inhabitants.

The original name for Laudium was Claudius, and it was initially planned as a white area, named after Claudius Marais de Vries who owned a farm called Mooiplats and was a former mayor of Pretoria.

Laudium was created by the Apartheid government as part of their policy aimed at moving ethnic groups out of Marabastad and central Pretoria, which were zoned as 'White Areas' following the passage of the Group Areas Act. Laudium was proclaimed as an Indian township in 1961.

The eastern portion of the original Claudius retained its name and white population for a time, but the white population of Claudius has been displaced by Indians (it was eventually also declared an Indian area by the Apartheid government, to reduce housing shortages in Laudium), and Claudius had effectively become an extension of Laudium by 1980.

Claudius straddles the R55 (Quagga Road), and parts of Second Avenue, Third Avenue, and Cuprene Street technically are part of Claudius, along with Sunrise School , however this smaller part of Cladius, west of the R55 is often regarded as part of Laudium, with the R55 being commonly thought of as the dividing line.

Extensions 2 and 3 are hilly and lie north of a railway line that linked the PPC dolomite quarry near Erasmia with Iscor's Pretoria Works. The railway line was abandoned by the mid-2000s, however, the railway right-of-way is still clearly visible, and it limits the road linkages between the upper and lower parts of Laudium to a bridge connecting Bengal Street to First Avenue, and a link between 19th Avenue and 33rd Avenue that was constructed in the early 1990s. In 1981, an Umkhonto weSizwe rocket attack on the Voortrekkerhoogte (now Thaba Tshwane) military base was launched from Laudium. The homes of local politicians who supported Apartheid were also bombed in the 1980s.

In 2012, Claudius east of the R55 had a wall and security gate system (road closure) installed, which residents have free access to as every resident paid a small portion of the cost of building the wall however, visitors have to fill out an entry/visitors book before entering, making it a gated community.

Although Laudium was initially part of Pretoria, it was incorporated into Centurion following the end of apartheid. Centurion, including Laudium, was incorporated into the City of Tshwane Metropolitan Municipality in 2000.

Dolomitic sinkholes occasionally cause significant damage to property and streets in Laudium. The dolomite risk area extends southwards from the railway line. Decaying water, sewerage and storm-water infrastructure has seen a rise in sinkhole formations.

== Demographics ==
Laudium has a large number of Hindu and Muslim residents, with a large number of temples and mosques, the oldest temple being the Shree Pretoria Hindu Seva Samaj and mosque PMT Jumma Masjid in Jewel Street. Many of the Hindu residents are Gujarati (mostly from Gujarat) or Tamils (from South India). Many of the Muslim residents are Memons, Kokanis or Surtis. There are also many recent South Asian (Indian and Pakistani) residents, who immigrated to South Africa after the end of Apartheid. Probably due to its visible Muslim population, it is also a destination for many Muslim refugees from other African countries.

Laudium was a relatively wealthy area (which was unusual for a township), with very large mansions visible from the R55 road. However, due to the crime in the area many residents have abandoned the area for the safer greener southern or eastern gated communities in the suburbs of Centurion. Most of the large bungalows are subdivided and rented out to immigrants (Indian, Pakistani, Egyptians, Moroccans and Somalians). The area is in decline, mainly due to crime, unemployment and drugs.

An economically deprived area of Laudium (described in an academic paper as a "ghetto"), informally called White Blocks (named after their paint colour), with single and multi-family government-built dwelling units is situated in the western part of Laudium. However, the Indian township of Lotus Gardens was established in the early 1990s, north of Church Street, and many Indian families from White Blocks were relocated there, and some old units were torn down. Lotus Gardens developed into a multiracial suburb. White Blocks continues to exist though the units are no longer exclusively painted white. The Laudium Police Station is in White Blocks, in a converted unit.

Another public housing development, in Extension 2, consisting of council flats, was later sold to residents and is now called Himalaya Heights and Bangladesh Heights.

After the end of Apartheid, many residents of Laudium moved to the neighbouring (formerly whites-only) suburbs of Erasmia and Christoburg which lie directly south of Laudium, relieving housing pressure caused by segregation, and, eventually, a link road was constructed, and later tarred, allowing for direct travel between the suburbs (previously, the only way to travel between Laudium and Erasmia was a circuitous route via the R55 and M26), and by the time of the 2001 census, Indians made up almost 66% of the population of Erasmia and Christoburg, having largely displaced their white residents in the preceding ten years. Significant numbers of more affluent Indian residents began relocating out of Laudium, to newly established nearby security estates in western Centurion in the late 2000s. Indians who reside in these areas often maintain religious, commercial and educational ties to Laudium itself.

The black township of Atteridgeville lies directly north of Laudium, although the two areas are separated by a series of hills, and no direct tarred road link exists between the two.

Laudium has 3 extensions which were completed in 1976, 1978 and 1983, respectively. Extension 1 consists of the western part of White Blocks, Extension 2 lies on the eastern portion of the hills north of the original suburb, and Extension 3 is west of Extension 2. The municipal Geographic Information System also lists and Extension 4, which is west of the suburb, and consists of non-residential land, including the Laudium Cemetery, the Laudium Stadium, Hindu Seva Samaj school, and Tshwane Muslim School.

A squatter camp established post-apartheid, called Itireleng lies south of the area called Kathmandu, a part of Extension 3.

== Education ==
Laudium has a large number of government schools. However, since the end of Apartheid, most Indian children from Laudium have begun attending newly established private religious schools, or schools in formerly white areas ("ex-model C schools" and private schools). While the government schools continue to be staffed mostly by Indian teachers, most of the pupils in these schools are black and commute daily from black townships.

=== Public Schools ===
- Andrew Anthony Primary School
- Hillside Primary School
- Himalaya Secondary School
- Jacaranda Primary School
- Laudium Heights Primary School
- Laudium Primary School
- Laudium Secondary School (Laudium High)
- Rosina Sedibane Sports School
- Sunrise School

=== Private schools ===
- Pretoria Hindu School (now Amity International School, Erasmia)
- PMT Sunni School
- Central Islamic School
- Pretoria Muslim School
- Al Ghazali College (in Erasmia)
- Al-Asr Educational Institute (in Claudius)

There are many Islamic educational institutes which specializes in teaching Islamic Sciences namely the Sunni Darul Uloom Pretoria

The Transvaal College of Education, which trained Indian teachers in the former Transvaal province was moved to a large campus in Laudium. However, after the end of apartheid, the college was deemed redundant and closed down (Indian teachers were no longer barred from colleges formerly used by white teachers). The college campus is now used by the Rosina Sedibane Sports School.

== Healthcare ==
The Laudium Hospital, a state hospital created under apartheid for Indians from Laudium and surrounding areas, closed down, and is now the Laudium Community Health Centre. This is controlled by the provincial department of health. Most if not all of the residents of the informal settlement (Itirileng) make use of the community health care centre. The facility is staffed mainly by foreign Cuban, Nigerian or Congolese doctors. In addition to the community healthcare centre a clinic operates at the heart in the CBD of Laudium which is a municipal clinic controlled by the municipality. This clinic offers primary healthcare. It has no beds and is strictly a day clinic. Laudium has a number of private medical practitioners and pharmacies. Laudium does not have a healthcare facility with radiological services (x-ray, CT scan, MRI or ultrasound).

== Religion ==
Multiple religions are followed in Laudium. This includes Christianity, Hinduism and Islam.

== Media ==
The Laudium Sun has been serving the area since 1984 and remains the only community newspaper in Laudium & surrounds.

== Transport ==
=== Roads ===
As with most townships under apartheid, road access was limited to allow for easy control by the security forces. Laudium also had only one entrance west of the R55 road, which links Laudium to central Pretoria as well as Centurion. It now has four access points. A dual carriageway, which is part of the R55, links Laudium with central Pretoria, while the deteriorated single-carriageway link to Centurion, which is also part of the R55, was upgraded to a dual carriageway by 2013. Freeway access is served by the N14, which is accessed via the R55 a few kilometers south. The N14 westbound from the R55 connects Laudium and surrounding areas to the West Rand, and the eastbound lanes are used to access the N1 to Johannesburg, via the Brakfontein interchange in Centurion.

Road links to the economically and academically important eastern suburbs of Pretoria are poor, usually requiring drivers to traverse the city centre or rat run across the Thaba Tshwane military base.

Although not a strict street grid, Laudium's street names follow a pattern, with north–south streets being numbered "Avenues" (with a few exceptions in Extension 3 where some avenues are named after cities in South Asia), while east–west streets are named, often after minerals and gemstones, colours (Extension 1, white blocks) or South Asian geographical features (Extensions 2 and 3).

=== Public transport ===
Public transport links are limited, and, although limited municipal bus services were introduced following the end of apartheid, minibus taxis remain the primary mode of public transport. Bus services to Johannesburg were available during the apartheid era (The Laudium Bus Service), but are no longer available. Tuktuks are also available at relatively low prices.

== Economics ==
Laudium originally had shops with limited items. Most of the shopping was done outside of Laudium. Post 1994, possibly coinciding with the rise of new residents, the increase in formal and informal retail has been noticeable. Many residences around the CBD have been converted to commercial.

Prior to 1994, there were no sit-down restaurants in Laudium. The few that attempted, including Nawab's eventually closed down. As of 2017, there were at least five restaurants and a number of fast food franchise outlets. Almost all of the restaurants are foreign Pakistani, Indian or Bangladeshi restaurants. This is also reflected in the majority of businesses in Laudium which are by far foreign owned. Again this is a further reflection of the greater picture in the country in which the majority of small business in all suburbs, townships and metropolitan areas are foreign owned..
