= Rooihuiskraal =

- Location within Gauteng Location within South Africa Location within Africa
- Coordinates: 25.899°S 28.155°E
- Country: South Africa
- Province: Gauteng
- Municipality: City of Tshwane
- Main Place: Centurion

Area
  - Total: 9.47 km^{2} (3.66 sq mi)

Population (2011)
  - Total: 17,337
  - Density: 1,830/km^{2} (4,740/sq mi)

Racial makeup (2011)
  - Black African: 21%
  - Coloured: 2.4%
  - Indian/Asian: 2.1%
  - White: 74.5%

First languages (2011)
  - Afrikaans: 66%
  - English: 22%
  - Northern Sotho: 1.9%
  - Tswana: 1.7%
  - Other: 8.4%
- Time zone: UTC+2 (SAST)
- Postal code (street): 0157
- PO box: 0154

Rooihuiskraal is a residential suburb on the southern outskirts of Centurion, Gauteng, South Africa.
