= Lyttelton, Gauteng =

Lyttelton
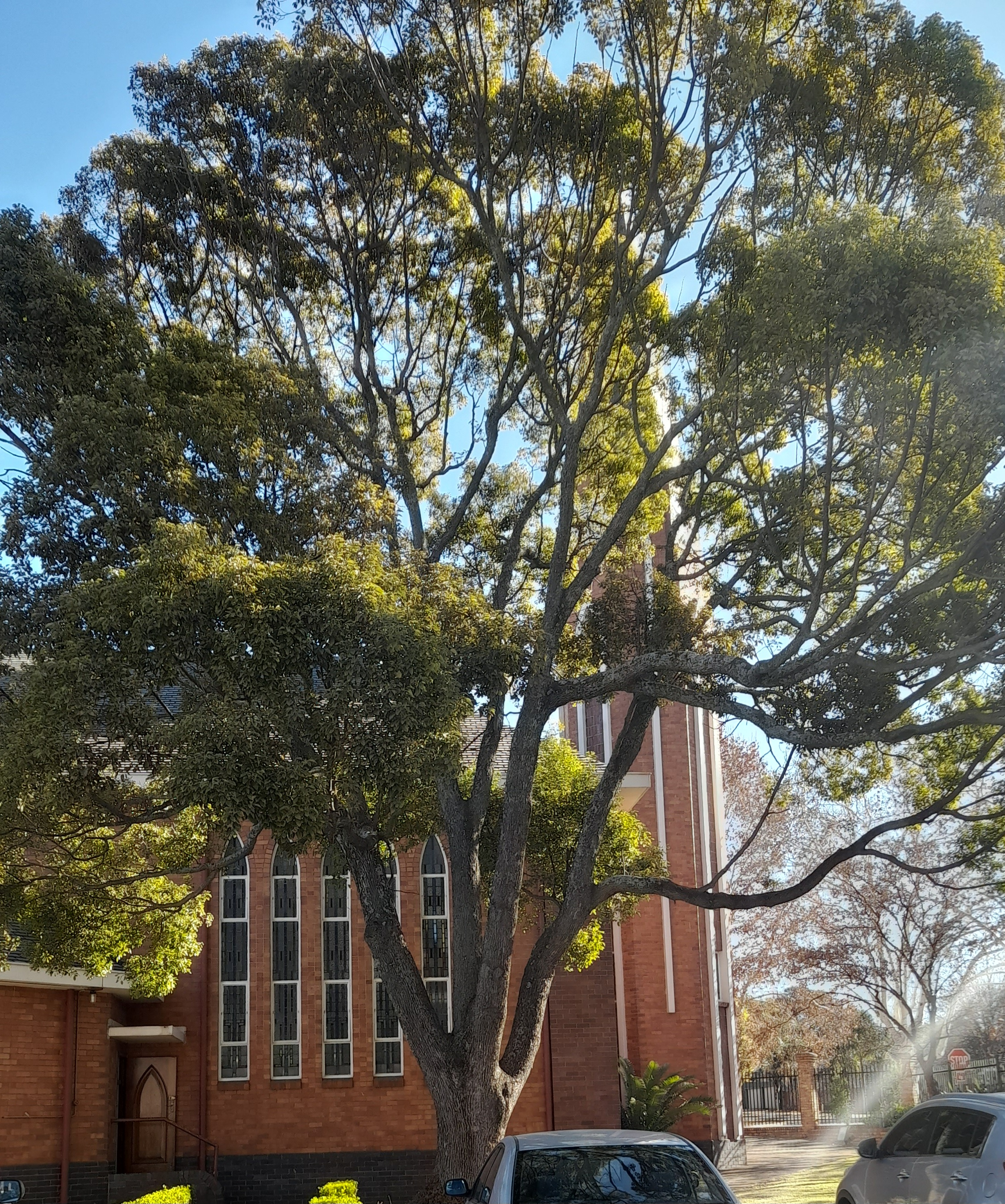
- Dutch Reformed Motherchurch of Lyttelton

- Location within Gauteng Location within South Africa
- Coordinates: 25°49′44″S 28°12′26″E
- Country: South Africa
- Province: Gauteng
- Municipality: City of Tshwane
- Main Place: Centurion

Area
  - Total: 7.97 km^{2} (3.08 sq mi)

Population (2011)
  - Total: 12,372
  - Density: 1,550/km^{2} (4,020/sq mi)

Racial makeup (2011)
  - Black African: 21.4%
  - Coloured: 2.6%
  - Indian/Asian: 2.6%
  - White: 72.4%
  - Other: 1.0%

First languages (2011)
  - Afrikaans: 62.0%
  - English: 20.3%
  - Northern Sotho: 4.1%
  - Tswana: 2.6%
  - Other: 11.0%
- Time zone: UTC+2 (SAST)
- Postal code (street): 0157
- PO box: 0140

Lyttelton is a suburb of Centurion in Gauteng Province, South Africa.
