= Irene, Gauteng =

Irene
- Location within Gauteng Location within South Africa Location within Africa
- Coordinates: 25°52′S 28°13′E
- Country: South Africa
- Province: Gauteng
- Municipality: City of Tshwane
- Main Place: Centurion

Area
  - Total: 1.74 km^{2} (0.67 sq mi)

Population (2011)
  - Total: 2,684
  - Density: 1,540/km^{2} (4,000/sq mi)

Racial makeup (2011)
  - Black African: 19.8%
  - Coloured: 1.5%
  - Indian/Asian: 0.9%
  - White: 76.8%
  - Other: 1.0%

First languages (2011)
  - English: 55.4%
  - Afrikaans: 32.5%
  - Northern Sotho: 2.9%
  - Zulu: 1.8%
  - Other: 7.4%
- Time zone: UTC+2 (SAST)
- Postal code (street): 0157
- PO box: 0062

Irene (/aɪˈriːniː/ eye-ree-nee) is a small village on the eastern outskirts of Centurion, Gauteng, South Africa.

== Prehistoric inhabitants ==
Though they left no historical writings of their own, records from other sources in the early 19th century refer to the Bakwena tribe, also known as the Crocodile people, who lived in the area. When Mzilikazi (whose people became known as the Matabele) came to the area in 1825, they killed many of the Crocodile people and drove the rest away.

== European settlement ==
In the 1830s, a Boer Voortrekker named Daniel Elardus Erasmus left the Cape Colony and settled in the area near present-day Irene. Seeking economic and political independence in the hinterland, Erasmus built a farm that became known as Doornkloof. Doornkloof became known as the "kerkplaas" of the district. When Daniel died in 1875 he left the farm to his three sons.

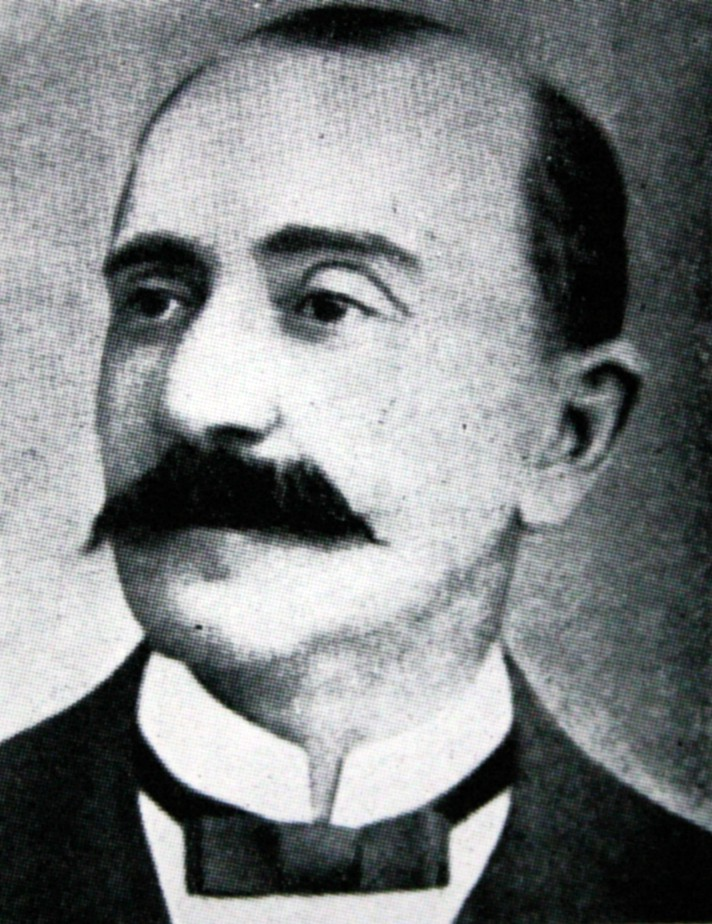
Alois Hugo Nellmapius renamed the farm 'Irene Estate' after his daughter Irene Violet Nellmapius.

In 1889 a controlling interest (2/3) of Doornkloof was purchased by Alois Hugo Nellmapius, a businessman. Nellmapius had previously established a transport business between Lourenço Marques and Pilgrim's Rest, as well as several industrial concerns (a gin and whisky factory, South Africa's first gunpowder factory, and the Irene lime works).

Nellmapius renamed the farm Irene Estate, after his daughter Irene Violet Nellmapius. Irene is derived from the Greek word meaning peace. She used to pronounce her name with three syllables: Ireenee, it is still pronounced like this today. Nellmapius often entertained at the Irene Estate in a grand style; a frequent guest was Transvaal president, Paul Kruger.

Nellmapius employed experts on his farm, including a Mr. Fuchs, who laid out the farmhouse gardens. Another of the authorities consulted by Nellmapius was Sir Arnold Theiler, the founder of Onderstepoort Research and Veterinary College.

== Irene ==
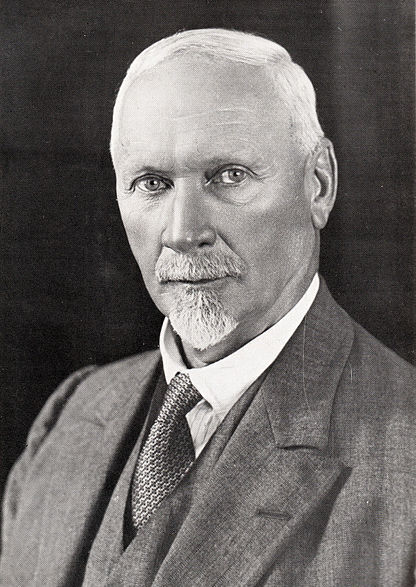
The ashes of Genl. Jan Smuts were scattered on a koppie in Irene after his death in 1950.

Irene was first proclaimed a township in 1902 by Johannes Albertus van der Byl (better known as Bertie), who had bought the Irene Estate in 1895. Bertie was first in the line of the Irene-born van der Byls, and who are now in their fifth generation.

In 1908, General Jan Christiaan Smuts—needing a home for his growing family—bought a third of the original Doornkloof farm. He paid £300 for the wood and iron building which had served as the officers' mess of the British forces in Middelburg during the Anglo-Boer War, and transported it to the site at Doornkloof. After his death, Smuts' ashes were scattered on Smuts Koppie, the longtime site of the Smuts' family home, near Doornkloof. Today, the Smuts House Museum on the site illustrates the life-style and multi-faceted career of one of South Africa's most prominent historical figures.

Irene was the site of one of the more than forty concentration camps where the British imprisoned the Boer (Afrikaner) women and children, whose homes had been destroyed as part of the British Army's 'scorched earth' policy during the Second Anglo-Boer War (1899–1902). More than 1,200 people, most of them children, died at the Irene Camp. Today, the names of those who died here are memorialized at the Irene Concentration Camp Cemetery and Memorial.

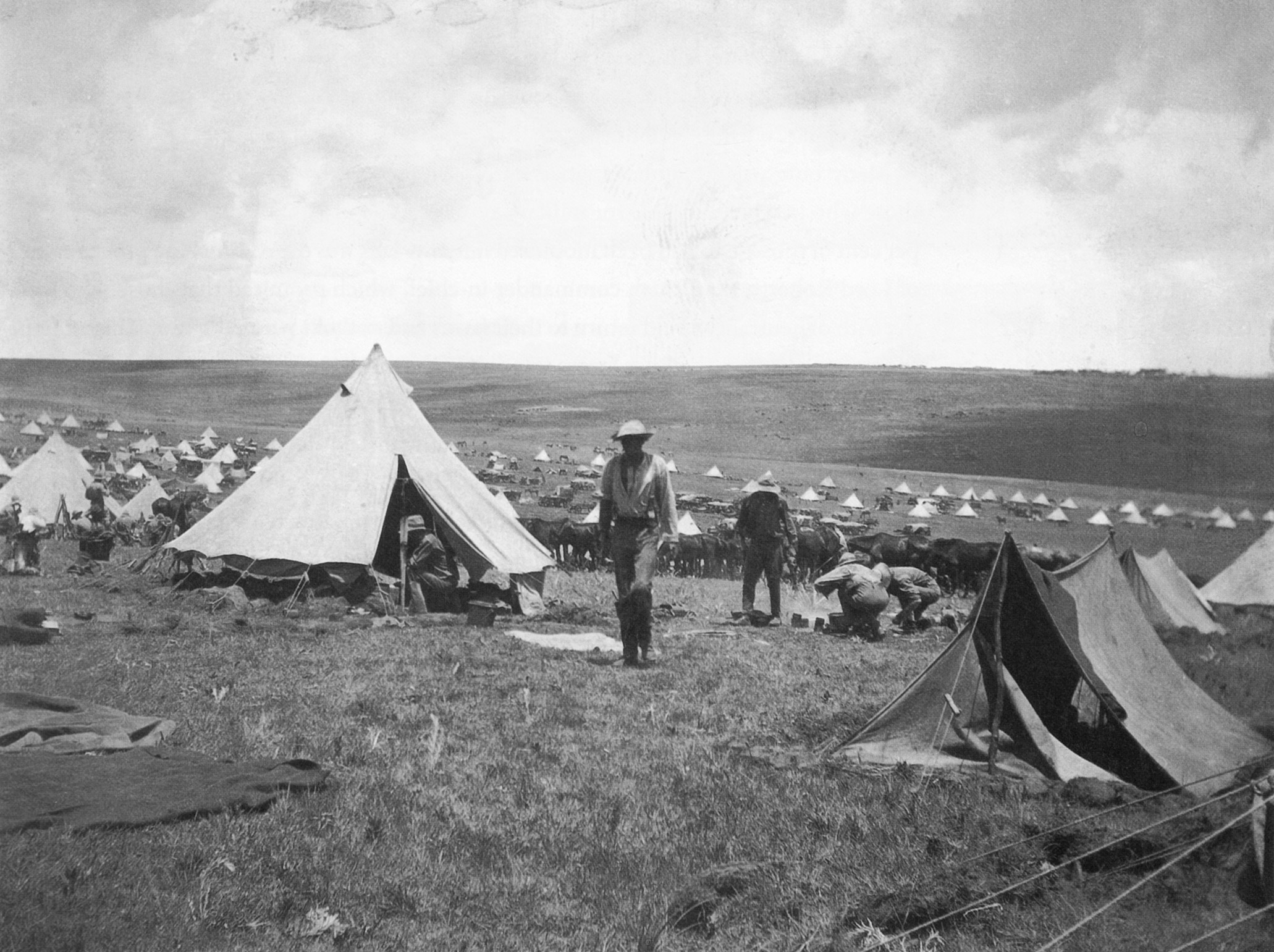
Tents of the British concentration camp for Whites of Irene.

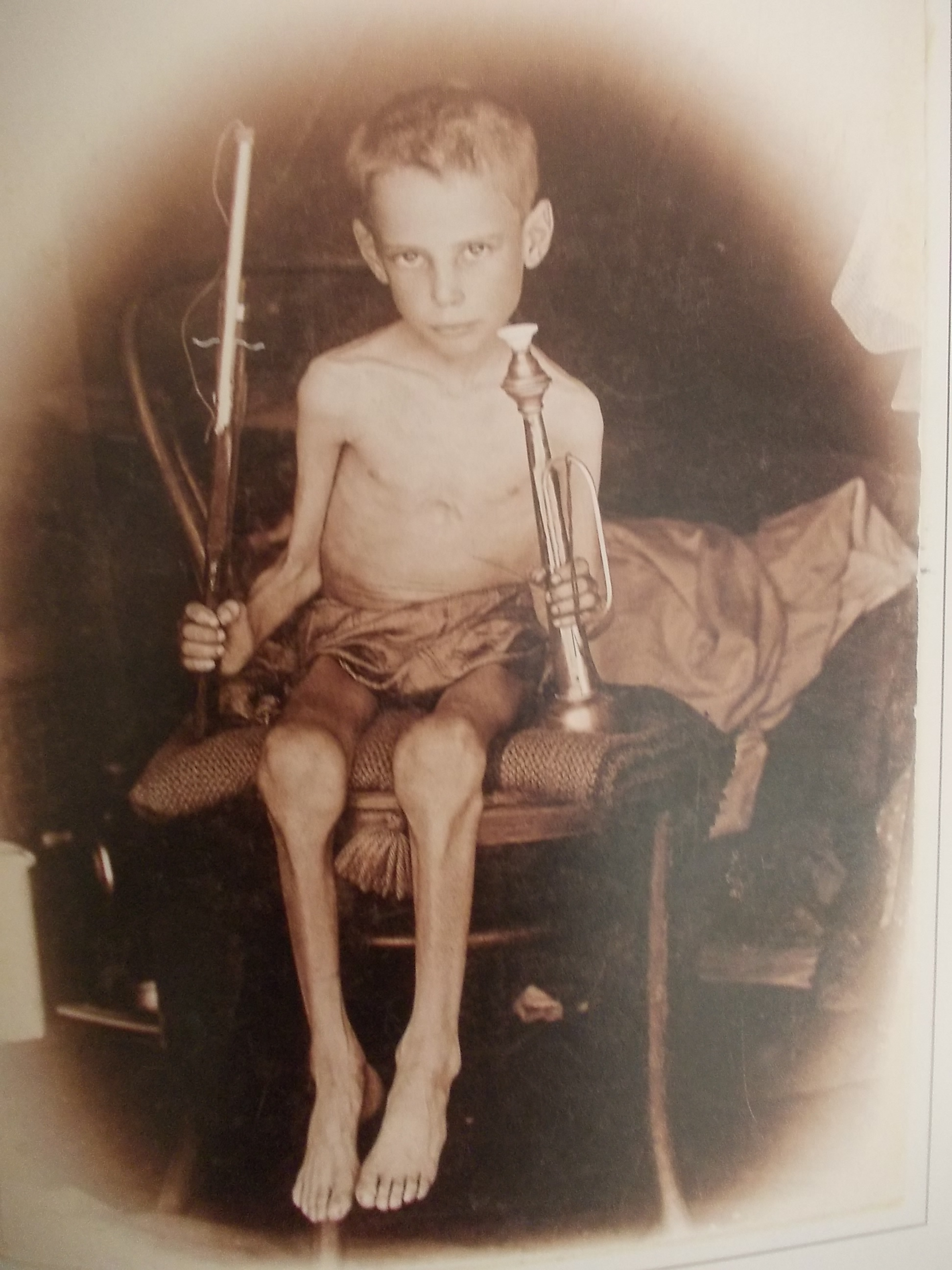
A malnourished Boer boy in the camp at Irene.

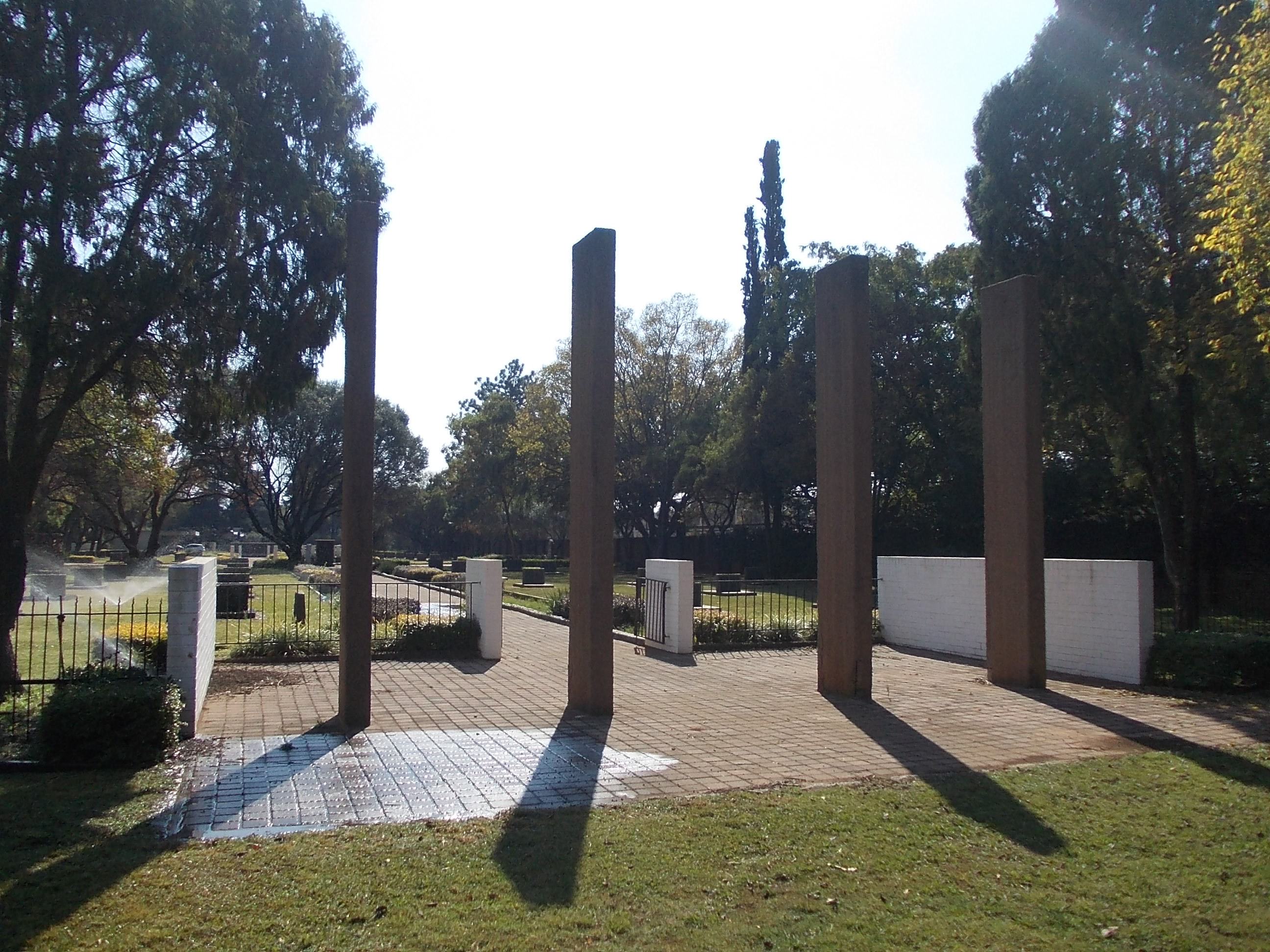
Irene Concentration Camp Cemetery's Pillars of remembrance.

In 1921 9th Irene Scout troop was founded, the 9th to open in Pretoria. The current Scout grounds were donated by the van der Byls in 1958, at a time when they still owned most of the land in Irene.

== Today ==
Irene lies within the town of Centurion; in 2000, along with the rest of Centurion, Irene was incorporated, into the City of Tshwane Metropolitan Municipality. It is situated next to the R21 and N1 highways, and has seen increased development in recent years. During the 2010 FIFA World Cup, the United States men's national soccer team based its training camp in the township and were stationed at the Irene Country Lodge.
