= Centurion, South Africa =

Area in Gauteng Province, South Africa

Centurion
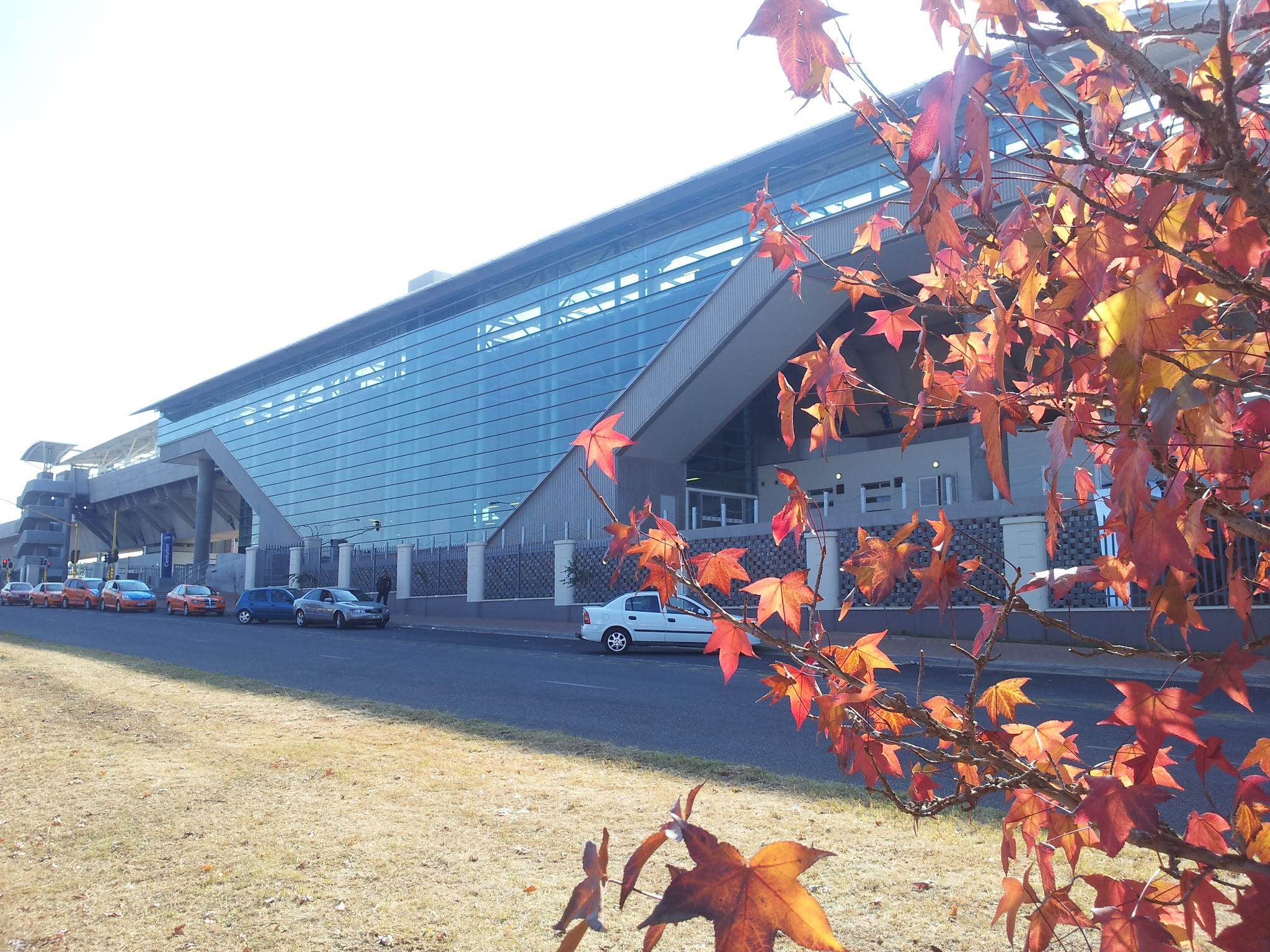
- The Centurion Gautrain station

- Location within Gauteng Location within South Africa Location within Africa
- Coordinates: 25°51′37″S 28°11′22″E
- Country: South Africa
- Province: Gauteng
- Municipality: City of Tshwane

Area
  - Total: 394.88 km^{2} (152.46 sq mi)
- Elevation: 1,453 m (4,767 ft)

Population (2011)
  - Total: 236,580
  - Density: 599.12/km^{2} (1,551.7/sq mi)

Racial makeup (2011)
  - Black African: 29.3%
  - Coloured: 2.3%
  - Indian/Asian: 8.4%
  - White: 59.0%
  - Other: 1.0%

First languages (2011)
  - Afrikaans: 49.4%
  - English: 26.0%
  - Northern Sotho: 5.2%
  - Tswana: 3.7%
  - Other: 15.6%
- Time zone: UTC+2 (SAST)
- Postal code (street): 0157
- PO box: 0046
- Area code: 012

Centurion (previously known as Verwoerdburg and before that Lyttelton) is an area with 236,580 inhabitants (2011 census) in the Gauteng Province of South Africa, between Pretoria and Midrand. Formerly an independent municipality, with its own town council, it has been part of the City of Tshwane Metropolitan Municipality since 2000. Its heart is at the intersection of the N1 and N14 freeways. The R21 freeway also passes through the eastern part of Centurion.

The Waterkloof Air Force Base, as well as the Swartkop Air Force Base (which includes the South African Air Force Museum), are in Centurion.

== History ==
=== Prehistoric ===
Fossils discovered at the Sterkfontein Caves show that hominids lived in the vicinity of Centurion between 2 and 3 million years ago. The Sterkfontein Caves, a World Heritage Site, is less than 50 km from Centurion, near Mogale City and Krugersdorp.

However, the earliest evidence of modern human habitation in the Centurion area does not go this far back. It dates back to 1200 AD when black African communities settled in this area. They cultivated lands, grazed their cattle, made earthenware containers and melted iron.

=== 19th century ===
In 1841, the Erasmus family arrived and settled in the area. Daniel Jacobus Erasmus settled on the farm Zwartkop, Daniel Elardus Erasmus on the farm Doornkloof and Rasmus Elardus Erasmus developed the farm Brakfontein. Several of the suburbs – such as Erasmia, Elardus Park, Zwartkop and Doornkloof – were named after these 19th-century owners of the land and their properties.

In 1849, Rev. Andrew Murray visited the farm Doornkloof and christened 129 babies, heard the profession of faith of 29 new members of the Reformed Church and the next day, 29 December 1849, celebrated communion.

In 1889, Alois Hugo Nelmapius bought the northern and north-eastern portions of the farm Doornkloof and named it after his daughter Irene (who died in 1961).

==== First Anglo-Boer War ====
As part of the First Boer War, the battle for Rooihuiskraal (Afrikaans for "Red House Kraal") took place in 1881 here. A Boer commando under the leadership of D.J. Erasmus Jr defeated Colonel Gildea, or "The Blasted Colonel" as they called him, the British Officer Commanding of the Pretoria Garrison. After the cornered British garrison tried to escape to Natal to join General George Pomeroy Colley, the Boers entrenched themselves behind a stone wall surrounding the animal stockade, and wounded the colonel in the backside, who was standing upright in his stirrups.

==== Second Anglo-Boer War ====
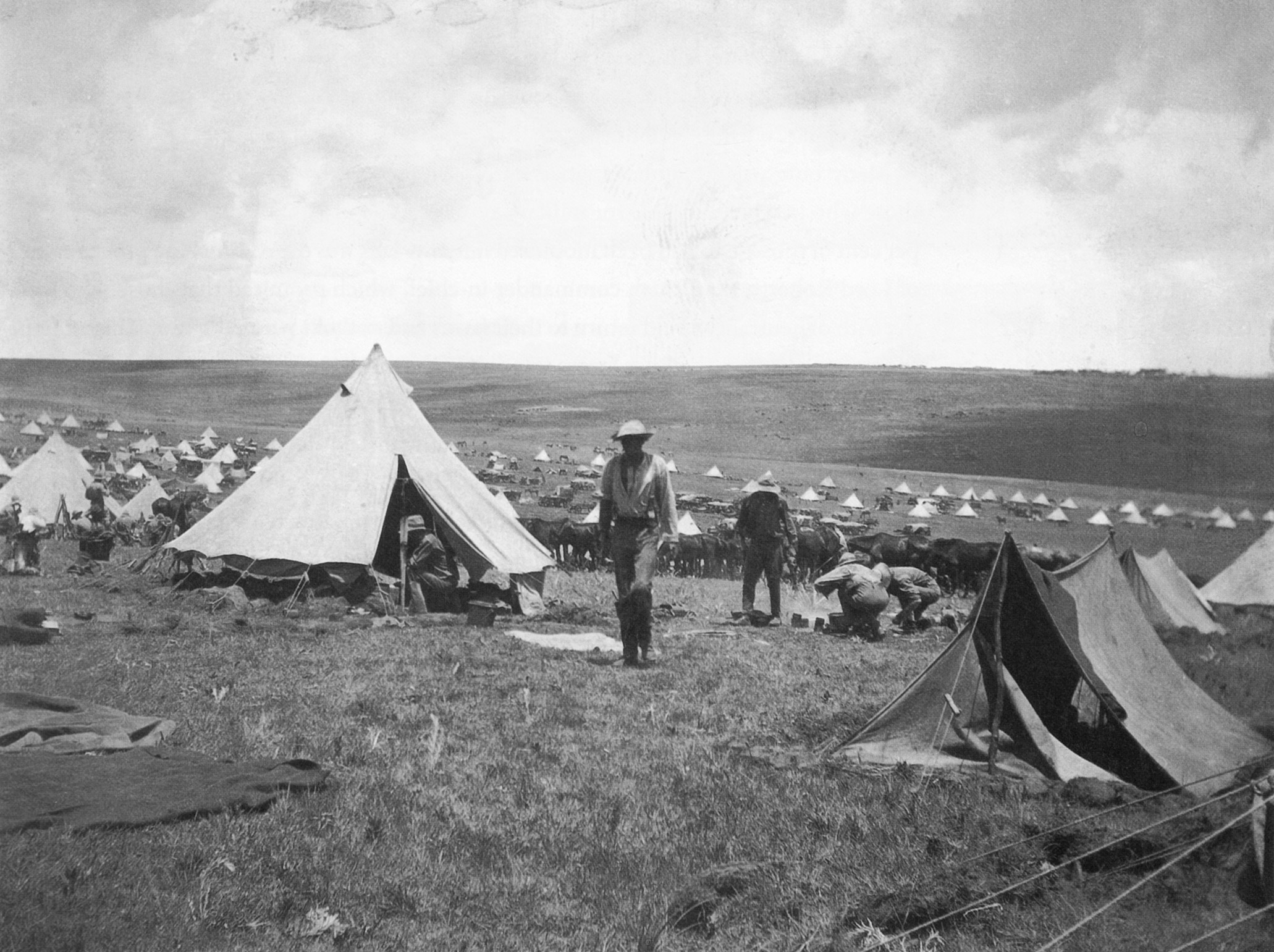
Photograph of the Irene concentration camp

During the Second Boer War, the Irene Concentration Camp was established in 1901 on the farm Doornkloof, as part of the British scorched earth policy, where Boer women and children were housed under extremely poor conditions. At its peak, the camp had 5,500 inhabitants, mostly women and children. Between February 1901 and the end of the war in 1902, 1,249 lost their lives here, about 1,000 of them children. The Irene Camp Cemetery is well preserved and contains 576 of the original slate tombstones that were carved by hand in the camp.

=== 20th century ===
The town of Irene was established in 1902 when 337 plots were laid out on the farm Doornkloof. Jan Smuts later owned this farm, and died there in 1950. The original Smuts House is a museum today.

Centurion developed from the initial Lyttelton Township that was marked out on the farm Droogegrond in 1904. Lyttelton Manor Extension 1 was established in 1942. These two townships initially resorted under the Peri Urban Board in Pretoria.

Centurion was granted City Council status in 1962 as Lyttelton. It was formed by combining the areas of Doornkloof, Irene and Lyttelton.

=== Name changes and post-apartheid reorganisation ===
Lyttelton was renamed Verwoerdburg in 1967, after Dr. Hendrik Verwoerd, the former prime minister of South Africa who was assassinated the previous year. The surrounding areas, as they grew, came under the same name and Lyttelton became known as one of the suburbs of Verwoerdburg. Others included Clubview, Eldoraigne, Kloofsig, Wierdapark, Zwartkop and their extensions.

The name Centurion was chosen by residents in 1995 (without the option to retain the existing name), soon after the end of apartheid, to match the name of the Centurion Park (now called SuperSport Park) cricket stadium, which is in the area. Following the end of apartheid, the Indian township of Laudium and surrounding suburbs including Erasmia and Claudius, which were formerly a part of Pretoria, were made part of Centurion. A township called Olievenhoutbosch was established in Centurion at around the same time.

In 2000, the Centurion local government became part of the newly created City of Tshwane Metropolitan Municipality, which also includes Pretoria, and the town ceased to have its own Town Council.

== Geography ==
=== Suburbs of Centurion ===
- Amberfield
- Brakfontein
- Bronberrick
- Celtisdal
- Centurion Central
- Claudius
- Clubview
- Die Hoewes
- Doringkloof
- Eldoraigne
- Erasmia
- Gerhardsville
- Hennopspark
- Heritage Hill
- Heuweloord
- Highveld
- Hoekplaats
- Irene
- Kloofsig
- Knoppieslaagte
- Kosmosdal
- Laezonia AH
- Laudium
- Louwlardia
- Lyttelton
- Lyttelton Manor
- Mnandi
- Monavoni
- Olievenhoutbosch
- Pierre van Ryneveld Park
- Pretoria Rural
- Raslouw
- Rooihuiskraal
- Rooihuiskraal North
- Skurweplaas
- Southdowns
- Sunderland Ridge
- Thaba Tshwane
- Thatchfield
- The Reeds
- Valhalla
- Vlakplaats
- Waterkloof 378-Jr
- Wierdapark
- Witch Hazel Avenue
- Zwartkop

=== Climate ===
Centurion is on the Highveld, like Johannesburg and Pretoria, and has a similar climate, with dry, sunny winters (max. daytime temperature around 20 °C dropping to an average minimum of 5 °C), and warm to hot summers (October – April) tempered by late-afternoon showers often accompanied by spectacular thunder and lightning. Hailstorms are not uncommon, but a serious hailstorm has not happened for many years. Summer temperatures range from the mid-20s to the mid-30s (°Celsius). Centurion's weather tends to follow the slightly warmer Pretoria, when compared to that of Johannesburg.

The Hennops River flows through the heart of Centurion, and causes occasional flooding when heavy rainfall has occurred.

=== Transport ===
The N14 freeway connects Centurion with Pretoria Central to the north and with Krugersdorp to the south-west.

The N1 freeway connects Centurion with Midrand and Johannesburg to the south and with eastern Pretoria and Polokwane to the north.

The Ben Schoeman Freeway connects Pretoria to the north with Midrand and Johannesburg to the south through Centurion. The section of this freeway from the Brakfontein Interchange in the southern part of Centurion to Pretoria forms part of the N14 while the section from the Brakfontein Interchange to Johannesburg forms part of the N1.

The R21 freeway connects the eastern part of Centurion with O. R. Tambo International Airport to the south.

The R101 road is a parallel road to the Ben Schoeman Freeway, connecting Pretoria with Midrand and Johannesburg, passing through the western suburbs of Centurion.

The R55 road also connects Pretoria with Johannesburg via the western suburbs of Centurion.

== Military ==
AFB Waterkloof and AFB Swartkop are in Centurion. Other military support services, including the former Military Medical Institute (now the Institute for Aviation Medicine), and the former Base Workshops and Vehicle Reserve Park (4VRP), were based in Centurion. It appears that 101 Air Supply Unit SAOSC is in Lyttelton.

There is also a South African Army installation in the area. Technical Base Complex Centurion is home to the 2 Parachute Battalion (a reserve force unit), 44 Parachute Engineers, 1 Military Printing Regiment, 4 Survey and Map Regiment, and the Army Engineer Formation. It also houses the Technical Service Training Centre, and units from the SAMHS and the SAAF. The base's TEK appellation may be derived from "Tegnies Basis Werkswinkel". It has a housing complex for active members. In addition, separately, the reserve force 3 Parachute Battalion is also headquartered in the town.

=== Memorials ===
- The South African Air Force memorial is at AFB Swartkop.
- The Irene Concentration Camp Cemetery and Garden of Remembrance is on Stopforth Road in Irene.
- There is a World War II memorial dedicated to South African Air Force members who gave their lives in the conflict, on Cornwall Hill.

== Society and culture ==
=== Museums ===
- South African Air Force Museum
- Centurion Art Museum
- Smuts House Museum

=== Sports ===
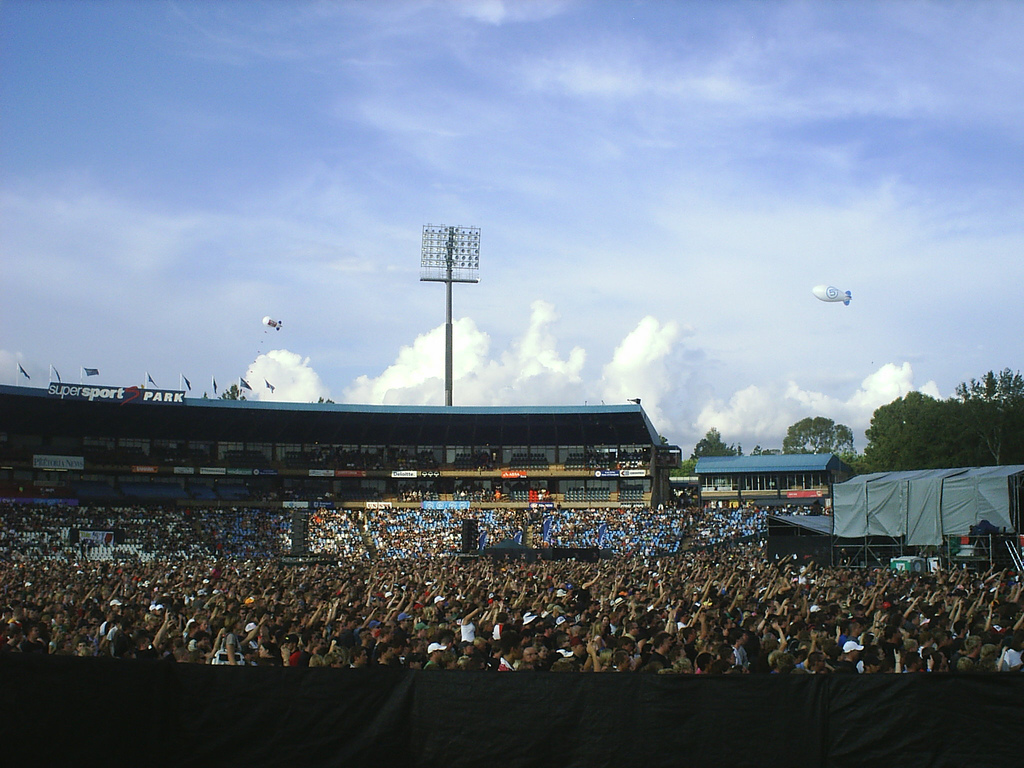
SuperSport Park, Centurion

Centurion has hosted many cricket tournaments, among them the 2003 Cricket World Cup, 2005 Women's Cricket World Cup, 2007 ICC World Twenty20, 2009 IPL and 2009 ICC Champions Trophy. Boxing Day Test are played at starting from 2013/14 season.

==== Stadiums ====
- SuperSport Park

== Government ==
The Railway Safety Regulator (RSR) previously had its head office in Lake Buena Vista Building in Centurion. Other government entities located in Centurion include the Independent Communications Authority of South Africa (ICASA) and the South African Civil Aviation Authority (SACAA).

== Residential areas ==
Centurion has one of the most secure golf estate in South Africa. The Centurion Golf Estate is about 2 km from Supersport Park. There are many other secure estates close by such as the Irene Estate and the Southdowns Estate.

== Tourism ==
Places such as Irene Farms and Supersport Park are the main tourism attractions.

== Education ==
=== Secondary education ===
- Abbotts High School Centurion
- Amberfield College
- Cornwall Hill College
- Cresta College
- Hoërskool Centurion
- Hoërskool Eldoraigne
- Hoërskool Uitsig
- Hoërskool Voortrekkerhoogte
- Hoërskool Zwartkop
- Lyttelton Manor High School
- Pinnacle College Raslouw
- Sutherland High School
- Southdowns College
- The Way Christian School
- Trinityhouse Heritage Hill

== Economy ==
=== Rapid growth ===
Centurion has come a long way from being a large town south of Pretoria, with smallholdings and large open spaces. Having experienced growth since 1994, like the rest of urban South Africa, many businesses have relocated there, and property development is boosting the ever-expanding city limits. This development has meant there is now little break between the outskirts of Pretoria to the north, and Midrand and Johannesburg to the south. The Gauteng Provincial Government predicted that, according to growth trends, much of the Gauteng province would be a megalopolis by 2015.

=== Centurion Aerospace Village ===
The Centurion Aerospace Village (CAV) was formally established in 2006 to create an aerospace supplier park where anchor firms are at the centre of the aerospace cluster and are supported by small and medium-sized producers. The supplier park is modelled on the local automotive industry and mirrors similar international parks, such as Silicon Valley, California, and Toulouse, France.

The CAV is in Pierre van Ryneveld Park, Tshwane, on state-owned land, adjacent to Aerosud Holdings, and along the eastern boundary of the Waterkloof Air Force Base. Aerosud was selected by the South African Department of Trade and Industry to be the industry driver and catalyst for this development.

The CAV development was made possible with the financial support of the European Union and the South African government, through the Sector-Wide Support Enterprise, Employment and Equity Programme (SWEEEP).

=== Infrastructure ===
Today, Centurion features modern shopping malls (Centurion Mall, Mall@Reds, Forest Hill City Mall), several entertainment spots, a theatre, golf courses and a driving range. Several hotels including Irene Country Lodge as well as a plethora of smaller guest houses. The Unitas hospital is the largest private hospital on the African continent (including a helipad) and is part of the Netcare group. Technology companies, including Aerosud, Accenture, Denel Dynamics, Siemens, SAAB Grintek Technologies, Telkom and others such as GMC Aircon, are in Centurion. The Gautrain has a station in Centurion.

== Centurion Mall ==
Established in 1983 as Verwoerdburgstad ("Verwoerdburg City"), the Centurion Mall was constructed around the Centurion Lake (on the Hennops River) and was the only shopping centre with the standard big-name retailers of that time in Centurion until the 21st century. In 2003, the mall underwent its first major revamp which was estimated at around 250 million ZAR. 29,760 m^{2} of retail space was added to the mall bringing the mall's total size to 105,000 m^{2}, making it the second largest shopping centre in the Tshwane metropolitan area.

The mall was also known for its man-made colour water fountain amenity, which was in the centre of the lake, on the north side of the mall (known as the 'bay' area). This water feature has been used as a 'logo' for the former Centurion town council, seen at many of the entrances of the previous municipality.
