= List of Pretoria suburbs =

This is a list of suburbs in the City of Tshwane Metropolitan Municipality, which includes the city of Pretoria and its surrounding suburbs and exurbs. Pretoria/Tshwane is divided into 7 regions namely Pretoria North, Far North, Central Western, Southern, Pretoria Far East, Eastern, Bronkhorstspruit. Region 3 not only include Pretoria CBD, Brooklyn, Hatfield but also the Moot area and Pretoria West. Both Moot and Pretoria West are listed separately below. The City of Tshwane is the second largest municipality in Gauteng and is among the six biggest metropolitan municipalities in South Africa. The following towns and townships form part of the Municipality's area: Pretoria West, Centurion, Akasia, Soshanguve, Mabopane, Atteridgeville, Ga-Rankuwa, Winterveld, Hammanskraal, Temba, Crocodile River and Mamelodi.

== Background ==
The City of Tshwane (covering Pretoria) in South Africa is the single-largest metropolitan municipality in the country, comprising seven regions, 107 wards and 210 councillors. Wards are delimited by the Municipal Demarcation Board (MDB). This entails the division of the whole geographic area of a municipality into smaller geographic areas, called wards. Schedule 1 to the Structures Act, 1998 provides for certain procedures and criteria to which the MDB must comply. The MDB must, amongst others, ensure that all wards in a municipality have approximately the same number of voters. The number of registered voters in each ward, may not vary by more than 15% from the norm (average). Thus there may not be a correlation between wards, neighborhoods, areas and suburbs. The seven regions are:

Region 1 – Soshanguve, Mabopane, Winterveld, Ga-Rankuwa and Pretoria North

Region 2 - Wonderboom, Sinoville, Montana, Temba, Hammanskraal

Region 3 – Pretoria CBD, Brooklyn, Hatfield and Pretoria West

Region 4 - Centurion, Irene and surrounding areas

Region 5 - Rayton, Roodeplaat, Cullinan

Region 6 – Pretoria East, Eersterust, Mamelodi, Shere

Region 7 - Bronkhorstspruit and surrounding areas

== Pretoria East ==
- Boardwalk
- Bronberg
- Brummeria
- Constantia Park
- Die Wilgers
- Elarduspark
- Equestria
- Erasmuskloof
- Faerie Glen
- Glenwood
- Garsfontein
- Hazeldean (Silverlakes Surroundings)
- Hillcrest
- La Montagne
- Leeuwenhof Estate
- Lombardy Estate
- Lydiana
- Lynnwood Glen
- Lynnwood Manor
- Lynnwood Ridge
- Mamelodi
- Menlyn
- Meyerspark
- Mooikloof
- Moreleta Park
- Murrayfield
- Newlands
- Newmark Estate
- Olympus
- Olympus Country Estate
- Pretorius Park
- Rietvalleipark
- Rietvalleirand
- Savannah Country Estate
- Shere
- Silver Lakes Golf Estate
- Silver Stream
- Silverton
- Silverwoods Country Estate
- Six Fountains Estate
- The Meadows
- The Meadows at Hazeldean
- The Ridge Estate
- The Wilds
- Tijger Valley and surrounds
- Val de Grace
- Waltloo
- Wapadrand
- Waterkloof
- Waterkloof Glen
- Weavind Park
- Welbekend
- Willow Acres
- Willow Glen
- Willow Park Manor
- Wingate Park

== Moot ==
- Capital Park
- Colbyn
- Gezina
- Kilner Park
- Moregloed
- Queenswood
- Rietfontein
- Rietondale
- Riviera
- Villieria
- Waverley
- Wonderboom South

== Pretoria North ==
- Akasia
- Amandasig
- Annlin
- Chantelle
- Clarina
- Dorandia
- Eldorette
- Eloffsdal
- Florauna
- Ga-rankuwa
- Heatherdale
- Heatherview
- Hesteapark
- Karen Park
- Klerksoord
- LesMarais
- Mabopane
- Magalieskruin
- Mayville
- Montana
- Montana Gardens
- Montana Park
- Ninapark
- Onderstepoort
- Parktown Estate
- Pretoria North
- Roseville
- Rosslyn
- Sinoville
- Soshanguve
- Strydfontein and surrounds
- The Orchards
- Theresa Park
- Tileba
- Wolmer
- Wonderboom
- Zambezi Country Estate

== Pretoria West ==
- Andeon AH
- Atteridgeville
- Booysens
- Claremont
- Danville
- Daspoort
- Elandspoort
- Hermanstad
- Kameeldrift West
- Kirkney
- Kwaggasrand
- Lotus Gardens
- Mountain View
- Philip Nel Park
- Pretoria Gardens
- Pretoria West
- Proclamation Hill
- Suiderberg
- Wespark

== Pretoria Old East ==
- Alphen Park
- Arcadia
- Ashlea Gardens
- Baileys Muckleneuk
- Berea
- Brooklyn
- Clydesdale
- Eastwood
- Erasmus Park
- Erasmusrand
- Groenkloof
- Hatfield
- Hazelwood
- Hillcrest
- Lukasrand
- Lynnwood
- Maroelana
- Menlo Park
- Monument Park
- Muckleneuk
- Pretoria Central
- Sterrewag
- Sunnyside
- Waterkloof
- Waterkloof Heights
- Waterkloof Park
- Waterkloof Ridge

== Pretoria Far North ==
- Boekenhoutskloof and surrounds
- Boekenhoutskloofdrif
- Bon Accord
- Buffelsdrift AH
- Bultfontein AH
- Cynthia Vale AH
- De Wagendrif
- Dinokeng
- Doornpoort and surrounds
- Grootvlei
- Hammanskraal
- Honingnestkrans
- Pyramid
- Rooiwal
- Temba
- Wallmannsthal
- Waterval
- Welgevonden and surrounds

== Pretoria Far East ==
- Bashewa
- Boschkop
- Bronkhorstspruit
- Country View Estate
- Cullinan and Surrounds
- Derdepoort
- Donkerhoek
- Doornkloof
- Elandshoek
- Grootfontein Estate
- Kameel Zyn Kraal
- Kameeldrift
- Kameeldrift East
- Kameelfontein and surrounds
- Kleinfontein
- Klipkop
- Krokodilspruit
- Leeuwfontein
- Lindopark
- Mooikloof Country Residences
- Mooikloof Equestrian Estate
- Mooikloof Gardens
- Mooikloof Glen
- Mooikloof Heights
- Mooikloof Ridge
- Mooiplaats AH
- Pebble Rock
- Pienaarspoort
- Rayton
- Rietfontein
- Rietvlei View
- Roodeplaat
- Roodepark Eco Estate
- Rynoue
- Sable Hills Waterfront Estate
- The Hills
- Tierpoort
- Zambezi Manor Lifestyle Estate

== Region 4 ==
- Centurion
- Irene
- Olievenhoutbosch
