= Metropolitan routes in Pretoria =

The City of Tshwane (Pretoria metropolitan area) like most South African metropolitan areas uses metropolitan or "M" routes for important intra-city routes, a layer below national (N) roads and regional (R) roads. Each city's M roads are independently numbered.

Pretoria metropolitan 1 route marker

Pretoria metropolitan 39 route marker

== Table of M roads ==
No.	Direction	Description of route	Suburbs	Street names
M1	North/South	M2/M6 (Central), M2, R104, M4, R101, R514/M8, R80, R101, R513, R566 (Annlin)	Central, Pretoria West, Hermanstad, Mountain View, Parktown, Mayville, Annlin West, Annlin	E'skia Mphahlele (D.F. Malan) Dr., Paul Kruger Street
M2	East/West	N1/N4 (Hatfield), M7, M5, M3, M18, R101, M1, M22 (Pretoria West)	Hatfield, Arcadia, Central, Pretoria West	Pretorius St./Francis Baard (Schoeman) St., Nana Sita (Skinner) St., Charlotte Maxeke (Mitchell) St./Soutter St., Charlotte Maxeke (Mitchell) St.
M3	North/South	M18, M11, M6, M2, R104, M4	Central	Nelson Mandela Blvd.
M4	East/West	M5 (Central), M18, R101, M1, R55, R511 (west of Pretoria)	Central, Pretoria West, Danville, Atteridgeville	Struben St./Johannes Ramakhoase (Proes) St., Vom Hagen St.
M5	North/South	M7/M18/R21 (Fountains), M11, M6, M2, R104, M4, M22, M8, R101/R513	Muckleneuk, Sunnyside, Arcadia, Gezina, Wonderboom South, Annlin	Elandspoort Rd., Steve Biko (Mears St. and Jeppe) St./Troye St., Steve Biko (Beatrix) St./Hamilton St., Steve Biko (Voortrekker) Rd., Steve Biko (Voortrekker) Rd./Johan Heyns (H. F. Verwoerd) Dr.
M6	East/West	M1/M2 (Central), R101, M18, M3, M5, M7, M30, N1, M16, M33, M12, M10, R25 (rural east of Pretoria)	Central, Sunnyside, Brooklyn, Lynnwood, Lynnwood Glen, Lynnwood Ridge, Die Wilgers, Wapadrand	Visagie St., Kotze St., Jorissen St., Lynnwood Rd.
M7	East/West, North/South	M22 (Pta. Industrial), R101, N14, M18, M5/M18/R21, M9, M11, M6, M30, M2, R104, M22, M8 (Queenswood)	Pretoria Industrial, Groenkloof, Nieuw Muckleneuk, Brooklyn, Hatfield, Colbyn, Queenswood	Roger Dyason St., Eeufees Rd., Christina De Wit Ave., George Storrar Dr., Middel St., Jan Shoba (Duncan) St., Jan Shoba (Duncan) & Tompson Sts./Gordon Rd., Gordon Rd., Stead Ave.
M8	East/West	M1/R514 (Hermanstad), R101, M5, M5, M29, M7, M22, N1/N4, M15, M15, M14, M10 (Mamelodi)	Hermanstad, Capital Park, Gezina, Villeria, Môregloed, Kilner Park, Lindopark, Eersterust, Mamelodi	Trouw St./Flowers St., Frederika St./Nico Smith (Michael Brink) St., Nico Smith (Michael Brink) St., Stormvoël St., Denneboom Ave., Tsamaya St.
M9	NW/SE	M11, M7, N1	Sunnyside, Nieuw Mucklenuk, Waterkloof, Waterkloof Ridge	Florence Ribeiro (Queen Wilhelmina) Ave., Rigel Ave.
M10	East/West, NE/SW	R55 (Eldoraigne), M34, R101, N14 (fly-over), M24, M18 (fly-over), R21, M28, N1 (fly-over), M57, R50, M33, M30, M11, M6, N4, R104, M8, R513 (Mamelodi)	Eldoraigne, Lyttelton, Monument Park, Erasmuskloof, Elardus Park, Wingate Park, Constantia Park, Garsfontein, Valley Farm, Nellmapius, Mamelodi	Wierda Rd., Trichardt Rd., Solomon Mahlangu (Hans Strijdom) Dr.
M11	East/West, NE/SW	M18 (Central), M3, M5, M9, M7, M30, N1, M33, M10 (Faerie Glen)	Central, Muckleneuk, Brooklyn, Menlo Park Menlyn, Faerie Glen	Jeff Masemola (Jacob Mare) St./Scheiding St., Rissik St./ Justice Mohamed (Walker) St., Justice Mohamed (Walker) St., Justice Mohamed (Charles) St., Atterbury Rd.
M12	North/South	M6 (Die Wilgers), M13, N4, R104, M14 (Waltloo)	Die Wilgers, Meyerspark, Waltloo	Simon Vermooten Rd.
M13	East/West	N4, M12	Die Wilgers	Rossouw St.
M14	NE/SW	M16 (Lynnwood Manor), N4, R104, M12, M8 (Waltloo)	Lynnwood Manor, Silverton, Waltloo	Lynburn Rd., Tambotie Ave., Watermeyer St., Waltloo Rd.
M15	North/South	R104 (Bellevue), M8, M8, R513 (NE of Pretoria)	Bellevue, Silverton, Lindopark	Dykor St., Derdepoort Rd., Stormvoël St., Baviaanspoort Rd.
M16	North/South	M6 (Lynnwood Ridge), M14, R104 (Scientia)	Lynnwood Ridge, Scientia	Meiring Naude Rd., Cussonia Ave.
M17	North/South	R514 (Kirkney), R513, R566, M20, M42, M44 (Mabopane)	Kirkney, Rural NW of Pretoria, Soshanguve, Mabopane	Hornsnek Rd.
M18	North/West	R101/M22, M4, R104, M11, M3, M7/M5/R21, M7, M10 (fly-over), M25, N1, M34, M31, to Johannesburg	Central, Groenkloof, Lyttelton, Doringkloof, Irene	Bosman St./Thabo Sehume (Andries) St., Christina De Wit Ave., Botha Ave., Main Rd. Centurion
M19	NE/SW	M25 (Zwartkop), N1, M36, M31(Highveld)	Zwartkop, Highveld	John Vorster Dr.
M20	North/South	R513 (The Orchards), R566, M17, M21 (Soshanguve)	The Orchards, Rosslyn, Soshanguve	Doreen Ave., Hebron Rd.
M21	NE/SW	R513 (Ga-Rankuwa), N4, R566, M20, M39, M44, M43, M35, R101 (Hammanskraal)	Ga-Rankuwa, Mabopane, Soshanguve, Hammanskraal	Molefe Makinta (Lucas Mangope) Dr.
M22	East/West, North/South	R55 (Proclamation Hill), M7, M2, Cosigned with(R104, M1), M1, R101/M18, M5, M29, M7, M8 (Kilner Park)	Proclamation Hill, Pretoria West, Central, Rietondale, Queenswood, Kilner Park	Quagga Rd., WF Nkomo (Church) St., E'skia Mphahlele (D. F. Malan) Dr., Boom St./Bloed St., Dr. Savage Rd., Soutpansberg Rd., C.R. Swart Dr.
M23	NE/SW	R50, M30	Moreleta Park	De Villebois Mareuil Rd.
M24	East/West	R55 (Valhalla), R101, N14, M10 (Lyttelton)	Valhalla, Lyttelton	Stephanus Schoeman Rd., Alaric Rd., Paul Kruger St., Snake Valley Rd.
M25	East/West	M37 (Wierda Park), R101, N1 (fly-over), M19, M34, M18 (Lyttelton)	Wierda Park, Zwartkop, Lyttelton	Hendrik Verwoerd Dr., Gerhard St., Station Rd.
M26	NE/SW	R511 (SW of Pretoria), R55 (Laudium)	Erasmia, Laudium	Main Rd. Erasmia
M27	East/West	M37 (Rooihuiskraal), R101, M19, M34, M18 (fly-over), M28 (Pierre van Ryneveld)	Rooihuiskraal, Zwartkop, Lyttelton, Pierre van Ryneveld	Theuns van Niekerk St., Estcourt Ave., Lenchen Ave., River Rd., Theron St.
M28	North/South	M10 (Waterkloof Ridge), R21 (fly-over), M27, M31 (Pierre van Ryneveld)	Pierre Van Ryneveld, Waterkloof Ridge	Van Ryneveld Ave.
M29	North/South	M22 (Rietondale), M8 (Gezina), R513 (Montana), N4 (Doornpoort)	Rietondale, Gezina, Montana, Doornpoort	Parker St., 15th Ave, Frates Rd, Dr. Swanepoel Road.
M30	NE/SW	M7 (Hatfield), M6, M11, N1, M33, M10, R25 (rural east of Pretoria)	Hatfield, Brooklyn, Menlo Park, Menlyn, Garsfontein, Pretorius Park	Duxbury Rd., Brooklyn St., Dely Rd., Garsfontein Rd.
M31	East/West	M37 (Rooihuiskraal), R101, N1 (fly-over), M36, M19, M18, R21 (Irene)	Rooihuiskraal, Highveld, Irene	Uitsig St., Nellmapius Dr.
M33	North/South	M6 (Lynnwood Ridge), M11, M30, M10 (Constantia Park)	Lynnwood Ridge, Menlyn, Garsfontein, Constantia Park	January Masilela (Genl. Louis Botha) Dr.
M34	NW/SE	M10 (Eldoraigne), R114, N14, M25, N1 (fly-over), M36, M18 (Irene)	Eldoraigne, Clubview, Doringkloof, Irene	Saxby Ave., Lyttelton Rd., Jean Ave., Alexandra Ave.
M35	North/South	R566 (north-east of Pretoria), M39 (Soshanguve), M39 (Soshanguve), Exits Pretoria	Soshanguve	Soutpan Rd.
M36	NE/SW	M31, M19, M34	Highveld	Olievenhoutbosch Rd.
M37	North/South	R114 (Wierda Park), M25, N14 (fly-over), M31, N1, R101 (The Reeds)	Wierda Park, Rooihuiskraal, The Reeds	Rooihuiskraal Rd., Samrand Ave.
M39	East/West	R101 (rural north of Pretoria), M35, M35, R80, M43, M43, M20, M17 (fly-over), M44, M21, exits Pretoria	Mabopane, Soshanguve	Mabopane Rd., Commissioner St, Rooiwalpad Rd.
M42	East/West	R80, M43, M17	Soshanguve	Ruth First Rd.
M43	North/South	M42, M39, M39, M21, M21	Soshanguve	Aubrey Matlala St., Unknown
M44	East/West	M21 (Mabopane), M39, M17, M20, M43, M35 (Soshanguve)	Mabopane, Soshanguve	Unknown

== See also ==
- Numbered routes in South Africa
