= M10 (Pretoria) =

Road in Pretoria, South Africa

Metropolitan route M10

Route information
- Maintained by City of Tshwane Metropolitan Municipality
- Length: 40.7 km (25.3 mi)

Major junctions
- West end: R55 in Sunderland Ridge
- M34 in Eldoraigne; R101 near Eldoraigne; N14 in Lyttelton; M24 in Lyttelton; M18 in Lyttelton; R21 near Monument Park; M28 in Monument Park M57 in Elardus Park; R50 in Elardus Park M33 in Constantia Park; M30 in Garsfontein; M11 near Garsfontein; M6 near Wapadrand; N4 near Equestria; R104 near Nellmapius; M8 in Mamelodi
- East end: R513 near Mamelodi

Location
- Country: South Africa

Highway system
- Numbered routes of South Africa
← M9	→ M11

The M10 road is a long metropolitan route in the City of Tshwane in Gauteng, South Africa. It connects Sunderland Ridge with Mamelodi via Lyttelton and Garsfontein.

== Route ==
The M10 begins in Sunderland Ridge, Centurion, at a junction with the R55 route. It heads eastwards as Wierda Road for 5 km, through Eldoraigne, to cross the Hennops River and reach a junction with the R101 route (Old Johannesburg Road). It then heads eastwards to pass under the N14 highway (Ben Schoeman Freeway) and enter the suburb of Lyttelton, where it meets the M18 route (Botha Avenue) and passes through as Trichardt Avenue.

The M10 continues eastwards as Solomon Mahlangu Drive (formerly Hans Strijdom Drive) to bypass the Air Force Base Waterkloof and meet the R21 highway at Monument Park in Pretoria. It then separates Elardus Park from Erasmuskloof, where it meets the northern terminus of the M57 route (Goedehoop Road) before meeting the R50 route (Delmas Road). It then forms the southern boundary of the Constantia Park suburb (separating it from Moreleta Park), where it meets the southern terminus of the M33 route (January Masilela Drive).

The M10 turns towards the north-east and passes through the large suburb of Garsfontein, where it meets the M30 route (Garsfontein Road) and the M11 route (Atterbury Road). After meeting the M11, it bypasses Faerie Glen and passes by Wapadrand, where it meets the M6 route (Lynnwood Road; Graham Road).

Still named Solomon Mahlangu Drive, the M10 heads north-east to cross the N4 toll highway (Maputo Corridor) east of Equestria before meeting the R104 route (Bronkhorstspruit Road) at the next junction. From the R104 junction, it continues north-east for 10 km, entering and passing through the large township of Mamelodi. At the junction with Mmogo Street in Mamelodi East, the M10 turns northwards. It meets the eastern terminus of the M8 route (Tsamaya Avenue) before reaching its end at a junction with the R513 route.
