= M30 (Pretoria) =

Road in Pretoria, South Africa

Metropolitan route M30

Route information
- Maintained by City of Tshwane Metropolitan Municipality
- Length: 33.2 km (20.6 mi)

Major junctions
- North-West end: M7 in Hillcrest
- M6 in Brooklyn; M11 in Brooklyn; N1 in Menlyn; M33 in Waterkloof Glen; M10 in Garsfontein
- South-East end: R25 at Welbekend

Location
- Country: South Africa
- Provinces: Gauteng
- Major cities: City of Tshwane

Highway system
- Numbered routes of South Africa
← M29	→ M31

The M30 road is a metropolitan route in the City of Tshwane in Gauteng, South Africa. It connects Brooklyn with Welbekend (near Bapsfontein) via Menlyn and Garsfontein. It is an alternative route to the M6 between Brooklyn and Welbekend.

== Route ==
The M30 route begins in Hillcrest (south of Hatfield; just east of the University of Pretoria), at a junction with the M7 route (Jan Shoba Street). It begins by heading south-south-east as Duxbury Road to meet the M6 road (Lynnwood Road) at the next junction. It continues south-south-east as Brooklyn Road, separating Brooklyn to the west from Menlo Park to the east, meeting the M11 route (Justice Mahomed Street) and becoming Dely Road, forming the eastern boundary of Waterkloof, to reach a junction with Garsfontein Road at the northern edge of Waterkloof Park (east of the Pretoria Country Club), where it leaves Dely Road and becomes Garsfontein Road eastwards.

Just after, the M30 meets the N1 highway (Pretoria Eastern Bypass; southbound only) and bypasses the Menlyn Park Mall to the south. It then turns to the south-east and passes through Waterkloof Glen, where it bypasses Menlyn Maine and meets the M33 route (January Masilela Drive). It then passes in-between the suburbs of Constantia Park to the west and Garsfontein to the east before reaching a junction with the M10 route (Solomon Mahlangu Drive).

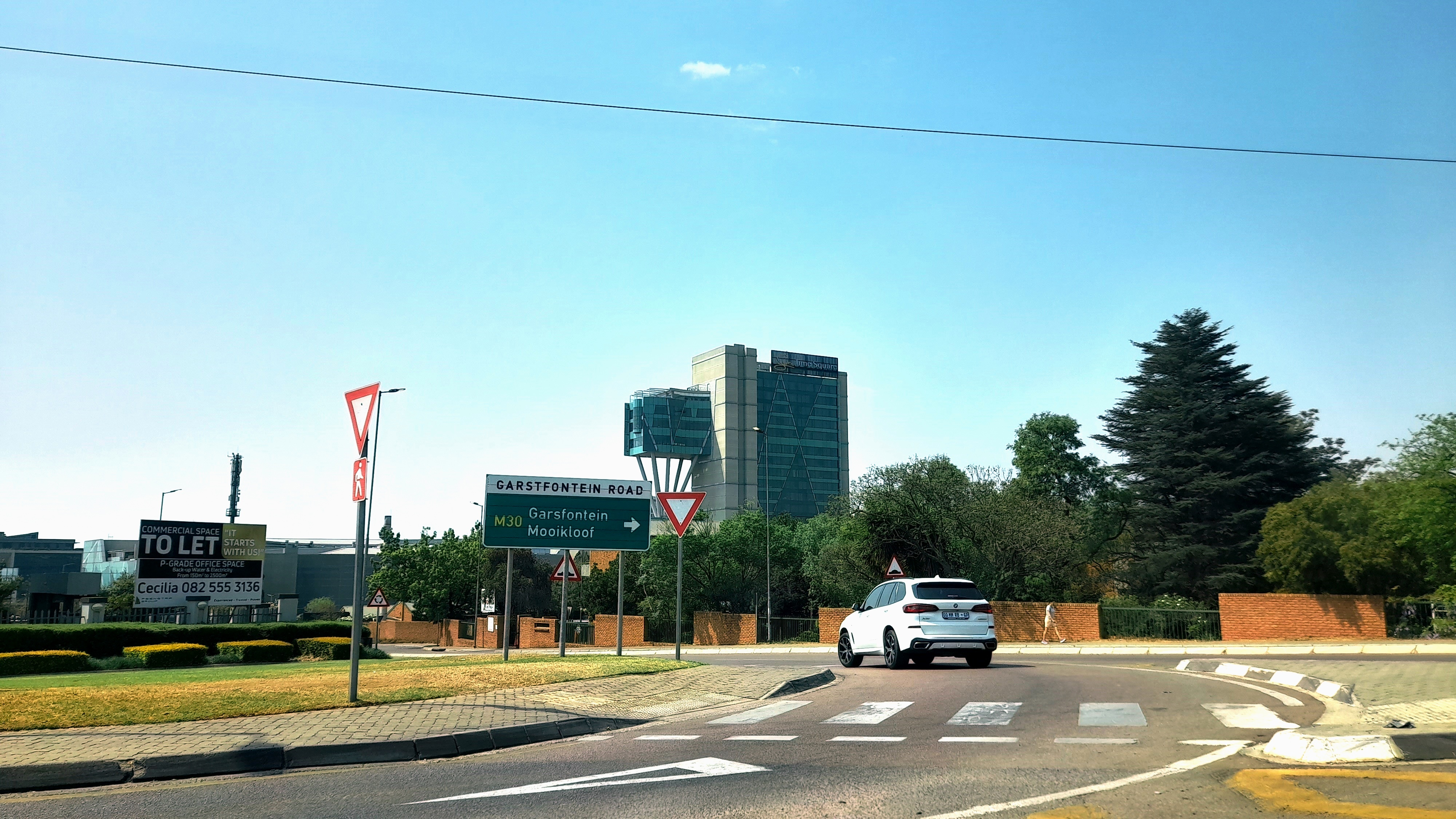
A road sign adjacent to The Glen High School, with Times Square in Menlyn Maine in the background.

From the M10 junction, the M30 heads south-east for 25 km, separating Moreleta Park to the west from Pretorius Park to the east, passing through Mooikloof, to reach its end at a junction with the R25 route at Welbekend, just north-east of Bapsfontein.
