= M33 (Pretoria) =

Road in Pretoria, South Africa

Metropolitan route M33

Route information
- Maintained by City of Tshwane Metropolitan Municipality
- Length: 5.7 km (3.5 mi)

Major junctions
- South end: M10 near Constantia Park
- M30 in Waterkloof Glen; M11 near Garsfontein
- North end: M6 in Lynnwood Ridge

Location
- Country: South Africa

Highway system
- Numbered routes of South Africa
← M31	→ M34

The M33 road is a short metropolitan route in the City of Tshwane in Gauteng, South Africa. It consists of only one road (January Masilela Drive) in Pretoria East, connecting Constantia Park with Lynnwood Ridge.

== Route ==
The M33 begins at a junction with the M10 route (Solomon Mahlangu Drive) in Constantia Park. It begins by heading northwards as January Masilela Drive (formerly Gen Louis Botha Drive) through the Constantia Park suburb before entering the Waterkloof Glen suburb and meeting the M30 route (Garsfontein Road) adjacent to the Waterglen Shopping Centre and The Glen High School. The M33 continues northwards, separating the Menlyn Maine mini-city in the west from the Garsfontein suburb in the east, to reach a junction with the M11 route (Atterbury Road). Still named January Masilela Drive, the M33 continues northwards, bypassing the Faerie Glen Nature Reserve, to reach its end at a junction with the M6 route (Lynnwood Road) in Lynnwood Ridge.
