= M6 (Pretoria) =

Road in Pretoria

Metropolitan route M6

Route information
- Maintained by City of Tshwane Metropolitan Municipality
- Length: 40.2 km (25.0 mi)

Major junctions
- West end: M1 / M2 near Pretoria West
- R101 in Pretoria CBD; M18 in Pretoria CBD; M3 in Pretoria CBD; M5 in Sunnyside; M7 in Brooklyn; M30 in Brooklyn; N1 / M16 in Lynnwood M33 in Lynnwood Ridge; M12 in Die Wilgers; M10 in Wapadrand
- East end: R25 near Bapsfontein

Location
- Country: South Africa

Highway system
- Numbered routes of South Africa
← M5	→ M7

The M6 road is a long metropolitan route in the City of Tshwane in Gauteng, South Africa. It connects Pretoria West with a rural area east of Pretoria via Pretoria CBD, Brooklyn, Lynnwood and Wapadrand.

== Route ==
The M6 route begins in-between Pretoria West and Pretoria CBD, at a junction with the M2 route (Nana Sita Street) and the M1 route (Es'kia Mphahlele Drive). It starts by being a westwards one-way-street named Visagie Street through the Pretoria CBD (eastwards driving is via Nana Sita Street), meeting the R101 route (Kgosi Mampuru Street; Schubart Street) and the M18 route (Bosman Street; Thabo Sehume Street), up to the junction with the M3 route (Nelson Mandela Drive), where it becomes Kotze Street (no-longer a one-way street).

From the M3 junction, the M6 heads eastwards through the Sunnyside suburb, meeting the M5 route (Steve Biko Road; Troye Street), becoming Jorissen Street, to bypass the Loftus Versfeld Stadium, the University of Pretoria and the Pretoria Boys High School, where it becomes Lynnwood Road. It passes through the suburb of Brooklyn, where it meets the M7 route (Jan Shoba Street) and the M30 route (Brooklyn Road). It forms the northern boundary of the Menlo Park suburb before entering Lynnwood, where it crosses the N1 highway (Pretoria Eastern Bypass).

On the other side of the N1, it passes in-between Lynnwood Glen and Lynnwood Manor before passing through Lynnwood Ridge, where it meets the northern terminus of the M33 route (January Masilela Drive). It then passes through Die Wilgers, where it meets the southern terminus of the M12 route (Simon Vermooten Road). It then forms the southern boundary of the Equestria suburb and reaches Wapadrand, where it meets the M10 route (Solomon Mahlangu Drive).

The M6 turns to the south-east and heads for 22 km, becoming Graham Road and bypassing Silver Lakes, through a rural area, to end at a junction with the R25 route about 11 km north-east of Bapsfontein (just north of Welbekend).
