= M23 (Pretoria) =

Road in Pretoria, South Africa

Metropolitan route M23

Route information
- Maintained by City of Tshwane Metropolitan Municipality
- Length: 7 km (4.3 mi)

Major junctions
- West end: R50 near Elardus Park
- M30 in Moreleta Park
- East end: M11 near Olympus

Location
- Country: South Africa

Highway system
- Numbered routes of South Africa
← M22	→ M24

The M23 road is a short metropolitan route in the City of Tshwane in Gauteng, South Africa. It connects Elardus Park with Olympus via Moreleta Park. It consists of one street named De Villebois Mareuil Road.

== Route ==
The M23 route begins just east of Elardus Park at a junction with the R50 route (Delmas Road). It heads eastwards as De Villebois Mareuil Road through Moreleta Park to reach a junction with the M30 route (Garsfontein Road) at Woodlands. It continues eastwards through Garsfontein Mews to reach its end at a junction with the M11 route (Atterbury Road) just west of Olympus.
