= M11 (Pretoria) =

Road in Pretoria, South Africa

Metropolitan route M11

Route information
- Maintained by City of Tshwane Metropolitan Municipality
- Length: 16.8 km (10.4 mi)

Major junctions
- West end: R101 in Pretoria CBD
- M18 in Pretoria CBD; M3 in Pretoria CBD; M5 in Sunnyside; M9 in Sunnyside; M7 in Brooklyn; M30 in Brooklyn; N1 in Menlyn; M33 near Garsfontein; M10 near Garsfontein
- East end: M23 near Garsfontein

Location
- Country: South Africa

Highway system
- Numbered routes of South Africa
← M10	→ M12

The M11 road is a short metropolitan route in the City of Tshwane in Gauteng, South Africa. It connects the Pretoria CBD with Faerie Glen and Garsfontein via Sunnyside, Brooklyn and Menlyn.

== Route ==
The M11 route begins in the southern part of the Pretoria CBD, at a junction with the R101 route (Kgosi Mampuru Street; Sophie De Bruyn Street). It begins by heading eastwards, meeting the M18 route (Bosman Street; Thabo Sehume Street) and becoming two one-way streets (Jeff Masemola Street, formerly Jacob Mare Street, eastwards from the M18 and Scheiding Street westwards to the M18). It then reaches a junction with the M3 route (Nelson Mandela Drive) and crosses into the Sunnyside suburb.

The M11 continues eastwards, meeting the M5 route (Steve Biko Street; Troye Street) before becoming one street eastwards named Justice Mahommed Street (formerly Walker Street and Charles Street) (no-longer one way streets) and meeting the northern terminus of the M9 route (Florence Ribeiro Street). It then enters the Brooklyn suburb and meets the M7 route (Jan Shoba Street). It then meets the M30 route (Brooklyn Road) and enters the Menlo Park suburb.

The M11 then reaches a junction with Atterbury Road. Here, the M11 becomes Atterbury Road east-south-east and just after, it crosses the N1 highway (Pretoria Eastern Bypass) and passes north of the Menlyn Park Mall and the Menlyn Maine mini-city (south of Lynnwood Glen). It reaches a junction with the M33 route (January Masilela Drive) and then passes in-between the Faerie Glen suburb to the north and the Garsfontein suburb to the south to reach a junction with the M10 route (Solomon Mahlangu Drive). It proceeds south-east through Garsfontein Mews to end at a junction with the M23 route (De Villebois Mareuil Road).
