= M7 (Pretoria) =

Road in Pretoria, South Africa

Metropolitan route M7

Route information
- Maintained by City of Tshwane Metropolitan Municipality
- Length: 18.2 km (11.3 mi)

Major junctions
- West end: M22 at Proclamation Hill
- R101 near the Voortrekker Monument; N14 near Fountains Valley; M18 at Fountains Valley; R21 / M5 / M18 at Fountains Valley; M9 in Groenkloof; M11 in Brooklyn; M6 in Brooklyn; M30 in Hillcrest; M2 in Hatfield; R104 in Hatfield; M22 in Queenswood
- East end: M8 at Queenswood

Location
- Country: South Africa

Highway system
- Numbered routes of South Africa
← M6	→ M8

The M7 road is a metropolitan route in the City of Tshwane in Gauteng, South Africa. It connects Proclamation Hill with Queenswood via Pretoria Industrial, Groenkloof, Brooklyn and Hatfield.

It is an alternative route to the M22 route for travel between Proclamation Hill and Queenswood.

== Route ==
The M7 route begins at a junction with the M22 route (Quagga Road) in the southern part of the Proclamation Hill suburb. It begins by going south-east, through the eastern part of Pretoria Industrial, to meet the R101 route (Jan Smuts Street) adjacent to the Voortrekker Monument. It continues eastwards to meet the N14 highway (Ben Schoeman Freeway) at an interchange. Immediately after, the M7 reaches a junction with the M18 route (Christina De Wit Avenue) at the western entrance of Fountains Valley in the Groenkloof Nature Reserve.

The M7 joins the M18 and they are one road northwards up to the next junction (known as Fountains Circle), where they meet the southern terminus of the M5 route (Elandspoort Road) and the northern terminus of the R21 route (Nelson Mandela Drive). Here, the M18 becomes the road northwards (Nelson Mandela Drive) towards the Pretoria CBD while the M7 becomes the road eastwards.

The M7 continues eastwards through the Groenkloof suburb as George Storrar Drive to reach a junction with the M9 route (Florence Ribeiro Avenue). The M7 turns to the north-east as Middel Street and reaches a junction with the M11 route (Justice Mahommed Street) in Brooklyn. The M7 proceeds northwards as Jan Shoba Street (formerly Duncan Street) to meet the M6 route (Lynnwood Road) before meeting the north-western terminus of the M30 route (Duxbury Road) just east of the Brooklyn Police Station and University of Pretoria.

The M7 continues northwards to pass through the suburb of Hatfield, where it meets the M2 route (Francis Baard Street; Pretorius Street) and the R104 route (Stanza Bopape Street). From the R104 junction, the M7 heads north through the small suburb of Colbyn to reach another junction with the M22 route (Soutpansberg Road). It continues northwards through the suburb of Queenswood to reach its terminus at a junction with the M8 route (Nico Smith Road) just south of the Villieria suburb.
