= M9 (Pretoria) =

Road in Pretoria, South Africa

Metropolitan route M9

Route information
- Maintained by City of Tshwane Metropolitan Municipality
- Length: 7.6 km (4.7 mi)

Major junctions
- South end: N1 / R50 in Erasmuskloof
- M7 in Groenkloof
- North end: M11 in Sunnyside

Location
- Country: South Africa

Highway system
- Numbered routes of South Africa
← M8	→ M10

The M9 road is a short metropolitan route in the City of Tshwane in Gauteng, South Africa. It connects Erasmusrand with Sunnyside via Waterkloof Ridge. It consists of only two streets (Rigel Avenue and Florence Ribeiro Avenue).

== Route ==
The M9 route begins in Erasmusrand (just west of Erasmuskloof), at a junction with the N1 highway (Danie Joubert Freeway; Pretoria Eastern Bypass) and the northern terminus of the R50 route (Delmas Road). It begins by heading north-north-west as Rigel Avenue, forming the main road through Waterkloof Ridge.

After 4.7 kilometres, the M9 changes its street name to Florence Ribeiro Avenue (formerly Queen Wilhelmina Avenue) and forms the boundary between the suburbs of Groenkloof to the west and Waterkloof to the east, continuing north-north-west. It then reaches a junction with the M7 route (George Storrar Drive; Middel Street) and continues for another 1.7 kilometres to reach its end at a junction with the M11 route (Justice Mahommed Street) in Sunnyside.
