= Equestria, Pretoria =

Equestria
- Location within Gauteng Location within South Africa Location within Africa
- Coordinates: 25.763°S 28.337°E
- Country: South Africa
- Province: Gauteng
- Municipality: City of Tshwane
- Main Place: Pretoria

Area
  - Total: 3.73 km^{2} (1.44 sq mi)

Population (2011)
  - Total: 4,820
  - Density: 1,290/km^{2} (3,350/sq mi)

Racial makeup (2011)
  - Black African: 31.34%
  - Coloured: 3.63%
  - Indian/Asian: 2.86%
  - White: 60.75%
  - Other: 1.41%

First languages (2011)
  - Afrikaans: 48.33%
  - English: 24.09%
  - Northern Sotho: 5.56%
  - Other: 15.6%
- Time zone: UTC+2 (SAST)
- Postal code (street): 0184

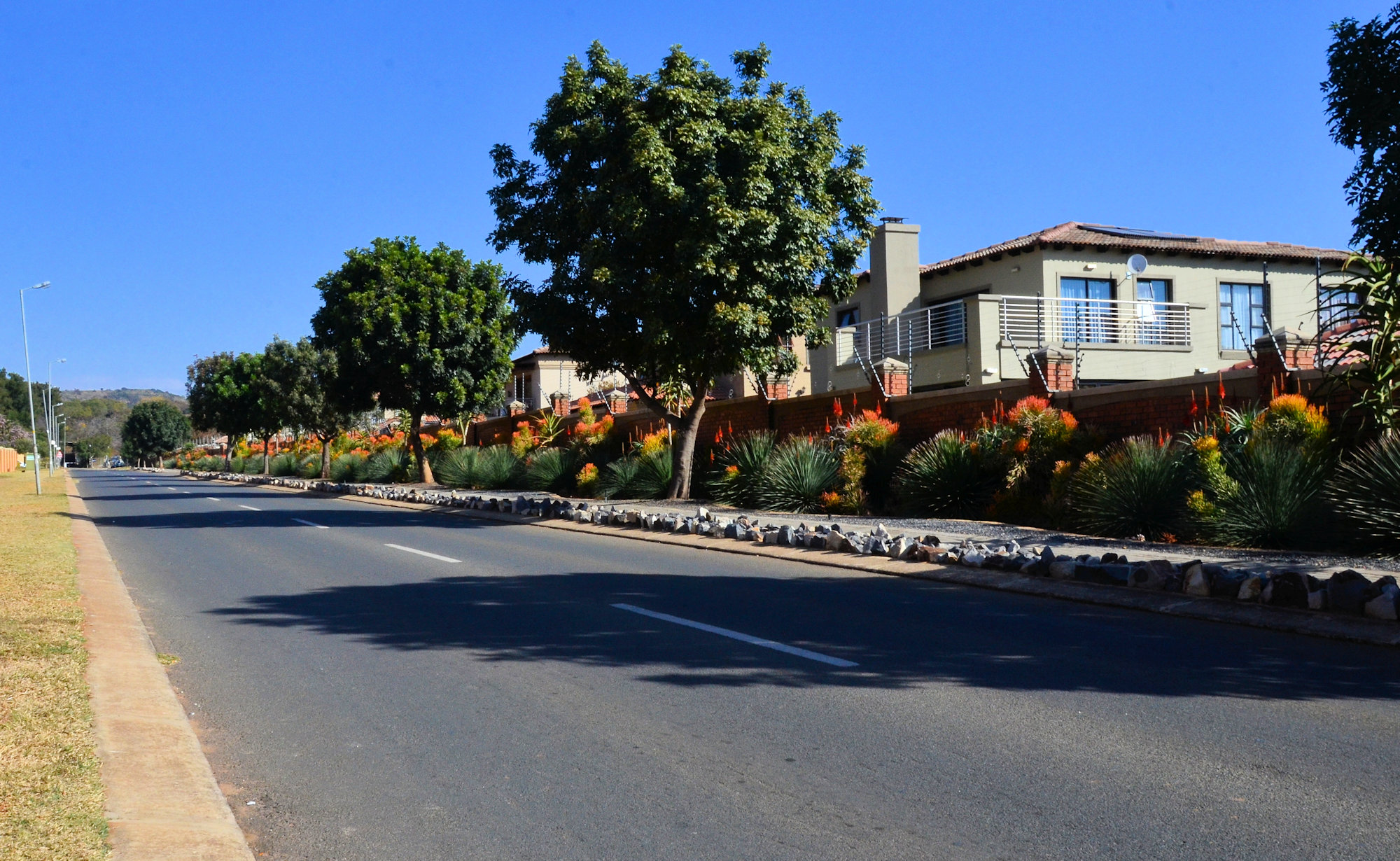
Libertas Ave in Equestria

Equestria is a suburb of Pretoria, South Africa, situated approximately 18 kilometres (11 mi) east of the city centre.

== Geography ==
Equestria is located on the eastern outskirts of Pretoria, bordering on the suburbs of Willow Park, Willow Glen AH and Nellmapius to the north, Willow Glen and Six Fountains to the east, Wapadrand to the south and Die Wilgers to the west.

== Retail ==
Equestria is largely served by The Grove Mall situated to the south of the suburb. Smaller shopping centres serving Equestria include Equestria Shopping Centre situated to the east and Lynnwood Lane situated to the south.

== Transport ==
Equestria is bordered by four routes, namely the N4 (north), M6 (south), M10 (east) and M12 (west). The N4 is the major national route and highway connecting Pretoria Central to the west with eMalahleni to the east. The M6 (Lynnwood Drive) connects Lynnwood to the west with Onbekend to the south-east. The M10 (Solomon Mahlangu Drive) connects Mamelodi to the north with Garsfontein to the south-west and provides access to the N4. The M12 (Simon Vermooten Road) connects Equestria with Waltloo and Mamelodi to the north and provides access to the N4.
