= Muckleneuk =

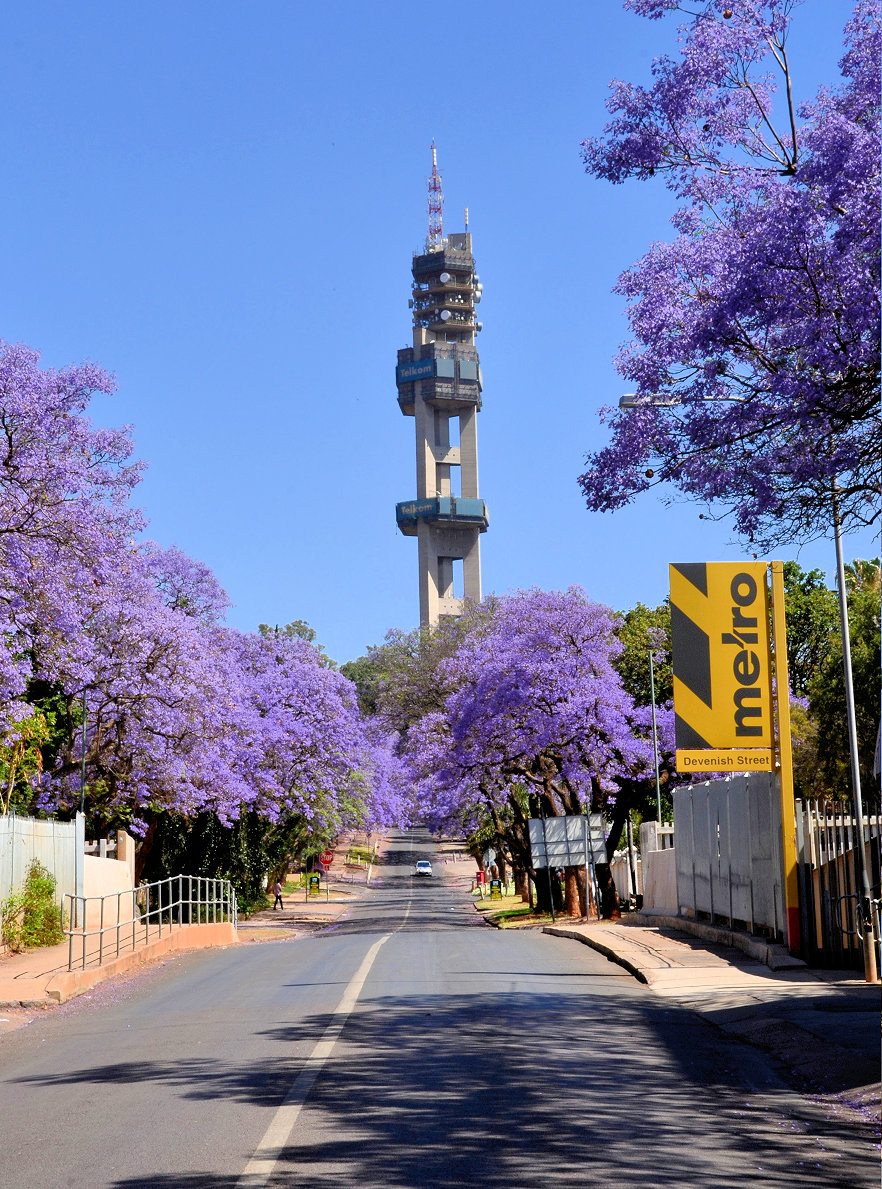
- Bourke Street in Muckleneuk

- Muckleneuk's location in Gauteng
- Coordinates: 25°45′43″S 28°12′25″E
- Country: South Africa
- Province: Gauteng
- Municipality: City of Tshwane
- City: Pretoria

Area
  - Total: 1.49 km^{2} (0.58 sq mi)

Population (2011)
  - Total: 7,268
  - Density: 4,880/km^{2} (12,600/sq mi)

Race
  - White: 16.01%
  - Asian: 0.7%
  - Cape Coloured: 2.2%
  - Black: 79.4%
  - Other: 1.6%

Language
  - English: 16.7%
  - Afrikaans: 11.3%
  - Northern Sotho: 10.2%
  - Tswana: 8.2%
  - Other: 53.6%

Muckleneuk is a neighborhood located southeast of Pretoria, South Africa.

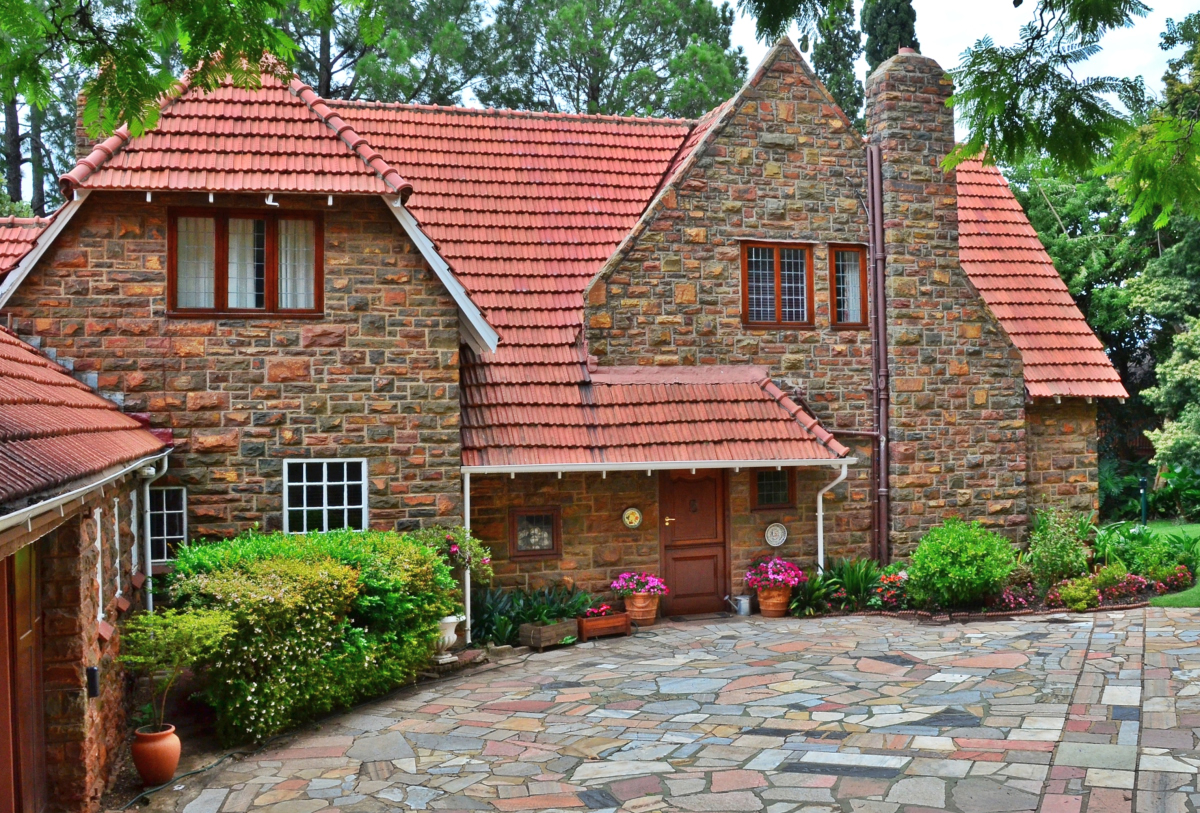
Moerdyk House, former home to the architect Gerard Moerdijk.

== History ==
The name of this area, which includes apartment buildings in the north and various-sized estates in the centre and south, comes from when a parcel of Elandspoort Farm was purchased by George Walker, whose family owned a property in Scotland by that name. Meaning "big nook", the name was used for three neighbourhoods of Pretoria in succession, including the modern Muckleneuk in 1914.

== Location and attractions ==
Muckleneuk lies to the south of Sunnyside, to the north of Lukasrand, to the west of Bailey's Muckleneuk, and to the south-east of Pretoria Central. It is bordered on the east by Nelson Mandela Drive, on the north by Justice Mahomed Street (formerly Walker Street), on the west by Florence Ribeiro Avenue (formerly Queen Wilhelmina Avenue), and on the south by Willem Punt Avenue, Devenish Drive, and Kruin Street. Principal thoroughfares include Berea Street (east-west) and Bourke Street (north-south). Most of the mansions are separated from the street with high fencing.

The quarter's houses include examples of the work of famed architects such as Gerard Moerdijk, Lockwood Hall and Sir Herbert Baker, as well as the Zuid-Afrikaans Hospital, the University of South Africa (UNISA) Art Gallery, Illyria House, and the Portuguese and Egyptian embassies. It is located near UNISA's main campus.

Partly situated on a hill, the heights of Muckleneuk provide a panoramic view of the central business district, the Union Buildings and the UNISA campus.

== Politics ==
During the 2014 South African general election, the district including 3/4 of Muckleneuk as well as Lukas Rand cast 44.56% of its votes for the African National Congress and 29.8% for the Democratic Alliance.
