= Duncan Street (Pretoria) =

Duncan Street is a street in eastern Pretoria, South Africa which forms a major north–south artery in the eastern part of the city. The street winds it way through Brooklyn Cycle and the suburbs of Brooklyn, Hillcrest, Hatfield, and Colbyn. In Colbyn it ends at the intersection of Glyns and Burns Streets.

== History ==
The street is named for Sir Patrick Duncan, Colonial Secretary of the Transvaal Colony in 1905 when Hatfield was founded. Originally, only the section from Church to South Streets was called Duncan Road. The part between South Street and Duxbury Road was known as Nixon Rd, and that from Duxbury to Lynnwood Roads as Lunnon Road. South of Lynwood Road, it was known as James Street.

In 1930, the Pretoria City Council renamed the whole road Duncan Street.

== Controversy ==
In September 2008, it was suggested that Duncan and 26 other Pretoria streets be renamed as offensively colonialist. However, to date the motion has not been implemented.

== Sources ==
- "Duncanstraat: Brooklyn-groep, sakeman haaks." Beeld. March 29, 1995.
