= Brooklyn Mall =

Shopping mall in South Africa

- Location within Gauteng

General information
- Location: Cnr Veale & Fehrsen Street, Nieuw Muckleneuk, Pretoria, South Africa
- Coordinates: 25.7717°S 28.2323°E
- Construction started: 1989

Height
- Top floor: UF (Upper Floor Shopping Level)

Technical details
- Floor count: 3 (Shopping Levels)

Other information
- Number of stores: ±220 outlets

Website
- www.brooklynmall.co.za

Brooklyn Mall is a shopping mall in Brooklyn, Pretoria, South Africa, owned by development company Growthpoint Properties. Brooklyn is designed around two spaces – the Mall itself, hosting the retail area, and Brooklyn Square, an outside dining area.
