= Colbyn =

- Colbyn's location in Gauteng
- Coordinates: 25°44′20″S 28°14′52″E
- Country: South Africa
- Province: Gauteng
- Municipality: City of Tshwane
- Main Place: Pretoria

Area
  - Total: 1.69 km^{2} (0.65 sq mi)

Population (2011)
  - Total: 1,516
  - Density: 897/km^{2} (2,320/sq mi)

Race
  - White: 67.0%
  - Asian: 1.3%
  - Cape Coloured: 2.6%
  - Black: 26.7%
  - Other: 2.4%

Language
  - Afrikaans: 51.0%
  - English: 32.4%
  - Northern Sotho: 3.0%
  - Tswana: 2.0%
  - Other: 11.6%
- Street: 0083
- Area code: 012

Colbyn is a suburb in central eastern Pretoria, South Africa.

== History ==
Colbyn is named after Colby, Isle of Man, where the suburb's developer, J.B. Kneen, was born. It was surveyed by the Methodist Church of Southern Africa, which also laid out Hatfield, Queenswood, and Kilner Park. The original deeds forbade the sale of liquor in all four neighborhoods.
