= Erasmuskloof =

- Location within Gauteng Location within South Africa
- Coordinates: 25.802222°S 28.286944°E
- Country: South Africa
- Province: Gauteng
- Municipality: City of Tshwane
- Main Place: Pretoria

Area
  - Total: 4.01 km^{2} (1.55 sq mi)

Population (2011)
  - Total: 5,406
  - Density: 1,350/km^{2} (3,490/sq mi)

Racial makeup (2011)
  - Black African: 21.92%
  - Coloured: 1.74%
  - Indian/Asian: 0.92%
  - White: 73.55%
  - Other: 1.87%

First languages (2011)
  - Afrikaans: 63.13%
  - English: 18.24%
  - Other: 3.35%
  - Sepedi: 2.84%
  - Setswana: 2.69%
  - isiZulu: 2.5%
  - Xhosa: 2.2%
  - Sotho: 1.84%
  - isiNdebele: 1.33%
  - Tshivenda: 0.78%
- Time zone: UTC+2 (SAST)
- Postal code (street): 0181
- PO box: 0048

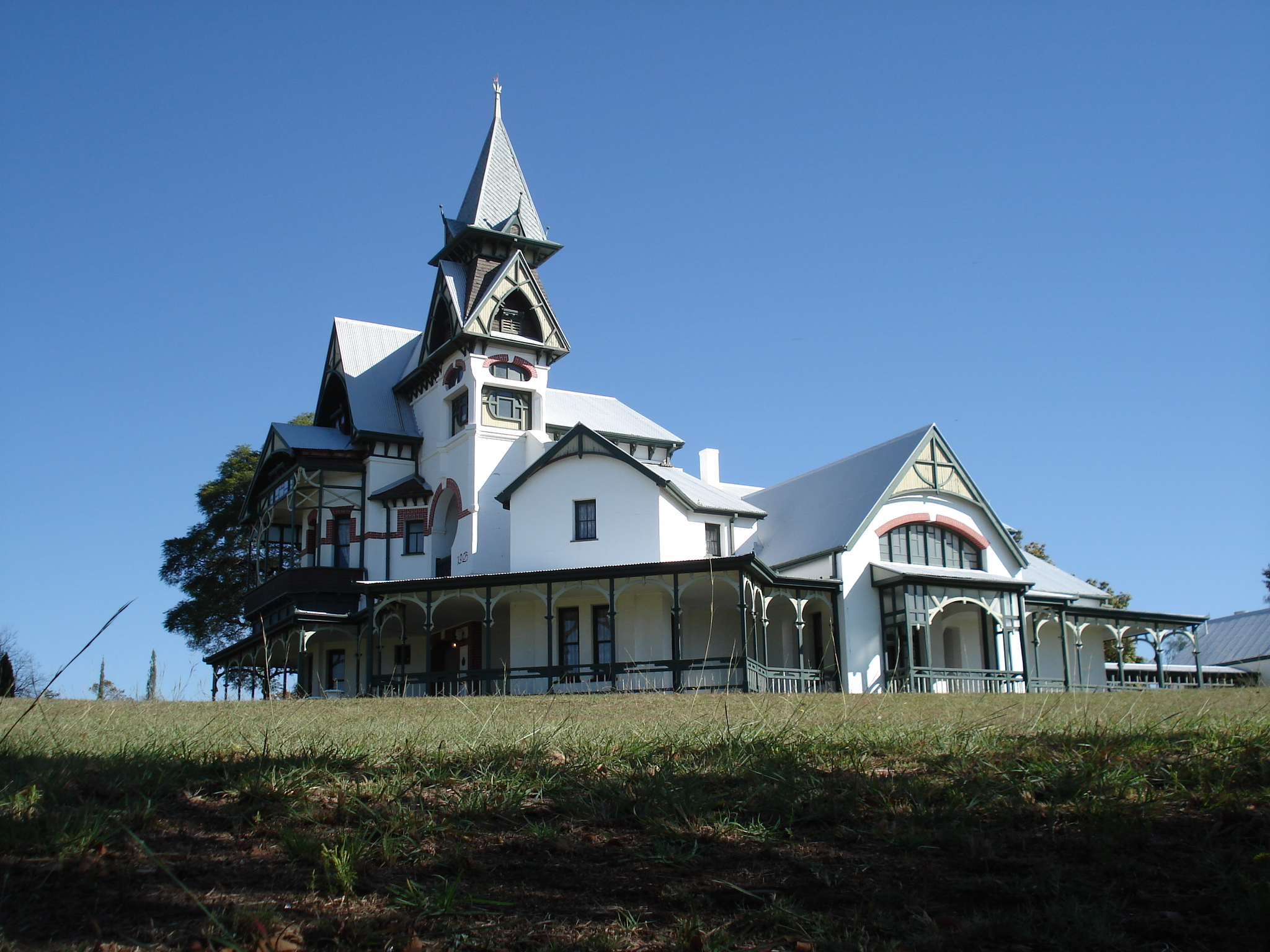
Erasmus Castle in Erasmuskloof

Erasmuskloof is a suburb in the east of the city of Pretoria, South Africa. It borders the suburbs of Constantia Park, Waterkloof Glen, Moreleta Park, Elardus Park, Erasmus Park, Erasmusrand and Waterkloof Glen.

Erasmuskloof is positioned near the N1 highway and major shopping malls Menlyn Park, Menlyn Retail Park, Menlyn Maine, coffee bars, restaurants, cafés and Castle Walk Shopping Centre.

== Secondary schools ==
* Hoërskool Waterkloof
