= Murrayfield, Pretoria =

Murrayfield
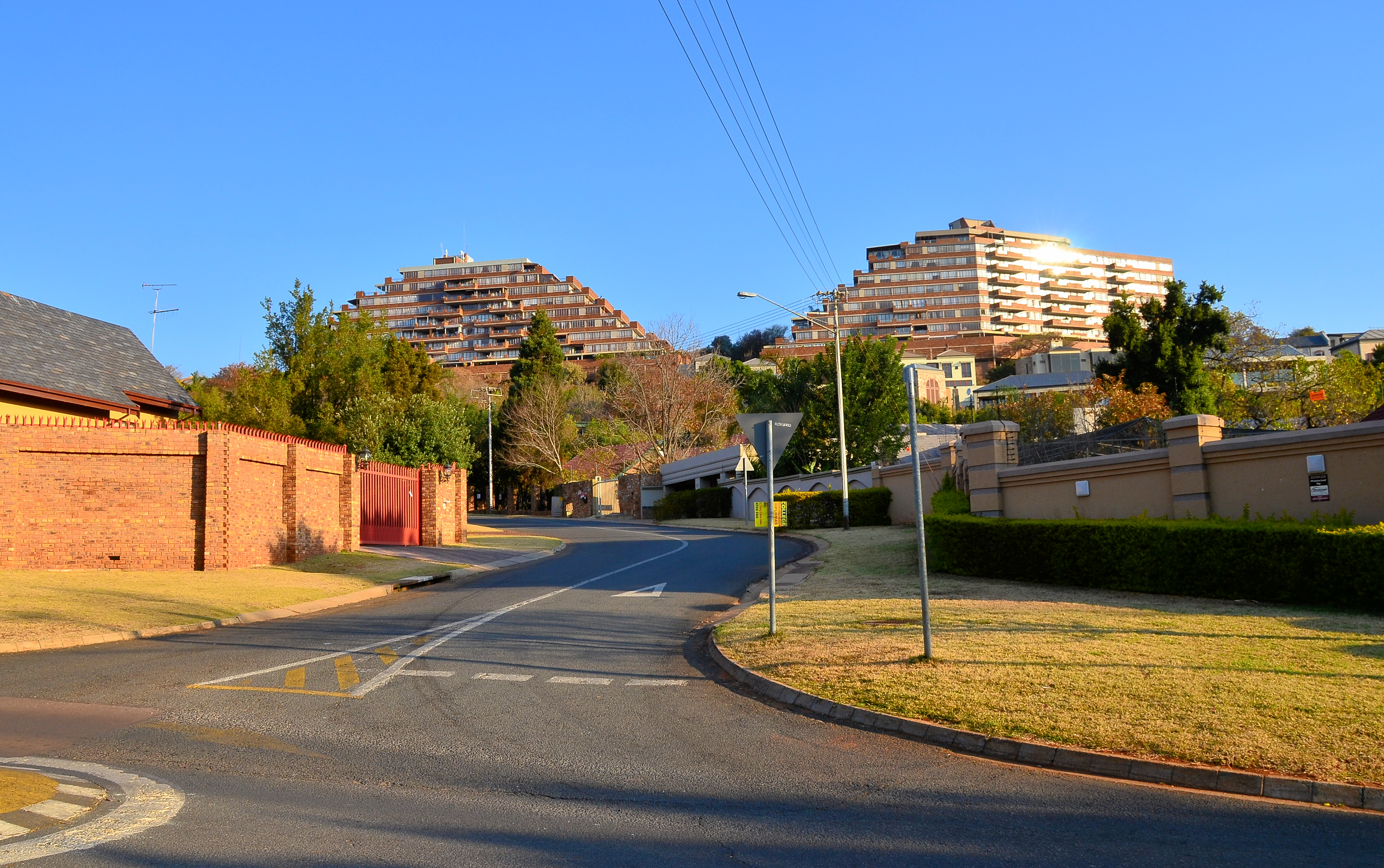
- Griselda Rd in Murrayfield

- Location within Gauteng Location within South Africa
- Coordinates: 25.751°S 28.304°E
- Country: South Africa
- Province: Gauteng
- Municipality: City of Tshwane
- Main Place: Pretoria

Area
  - Total: 1.06 km^{2} (0.41 sq mi)

Population (2011)
  - Total: 2,741
  - Density: 2,590/km^{2} (6,700/sq mi)

Racial makeup (2011)
  - Black African: 17.0%
  - Coloured: 2.2%
  - Indian/Asian: 1.8%
  - White: 78.3%
  - Other: 0.8%

First languages (2011)
  - Afrikaans: 63.2%
  - English: 23.0%
  - Tswana: 2.2%
  - S Ndebele: 1.5%
  - Other: 10.1%
- Time zone: UTC+2 (SAST)
- Postal code (street): 0184
- Area code: 012

Murrayfield is an eastern suburb of Pretoria, South Africa.
