= Sunderland Ridge =

- Location within Gauteng Location within South Africa
- Coordinates: 25.840°S 28.105°E
- Country: South Africa
- Province: Gauteng
- Municipality: City of Tshwane
- Main Place: Centurion

Area
  - Total: 1.11 km^{2} (0.43 sq mi)

Population (2011)
  - Total: 37
  - Density: 33/km^{2} (86/sq mi)

Racial makeup (2011)
  - Black African: 94.6%
  - Coloured: 5.4%

First languages (2011)
  - Northern Sotho: 46%
  - Venda: 19%
  - Other: 35%
- Time zone: UTC+2 (SAST)
- Postal code (street): 0157

Sunderland Ridge is an industrial township of Centurion, Gauteng, South Africa.
