= Waterkloof Park =

- Location within Gauteng Location within South Africa
- Coordinates: 25°47′29″S 28°15′47″E
- Country: South Africa
- Province: Gauteng
- Municipality: City of Tshwane
- Main Place: Pretoria

Area
  - Total: 0.35 km^{2} (0.14 sq mi)

Population (2011)
  - Total: 491
  - Density: 1,400/km^{2} (3,600/sq mi)

Racial makeup (2011)
  - Black African: 15.9%
  - Coloured: 1.0%
  - Indian/Asian: 15.9%
  - White: 62.5%
  - Other: 4.7%

First languages (2011)
  - Afrikaans: 42.0%
  - English: 25.8%
  - Sotho: 5.3%
  - Xhosa: 1.2%
  - Other: 25.7%
- Time zone: UTC+2 (SAST)

Waterkloof Park is a tiny suburb of the city of Pretoria, South Africa. Located southeast of Waterkloof, it is home to some of the city's most expensive real estate.
