= Waterkloof =

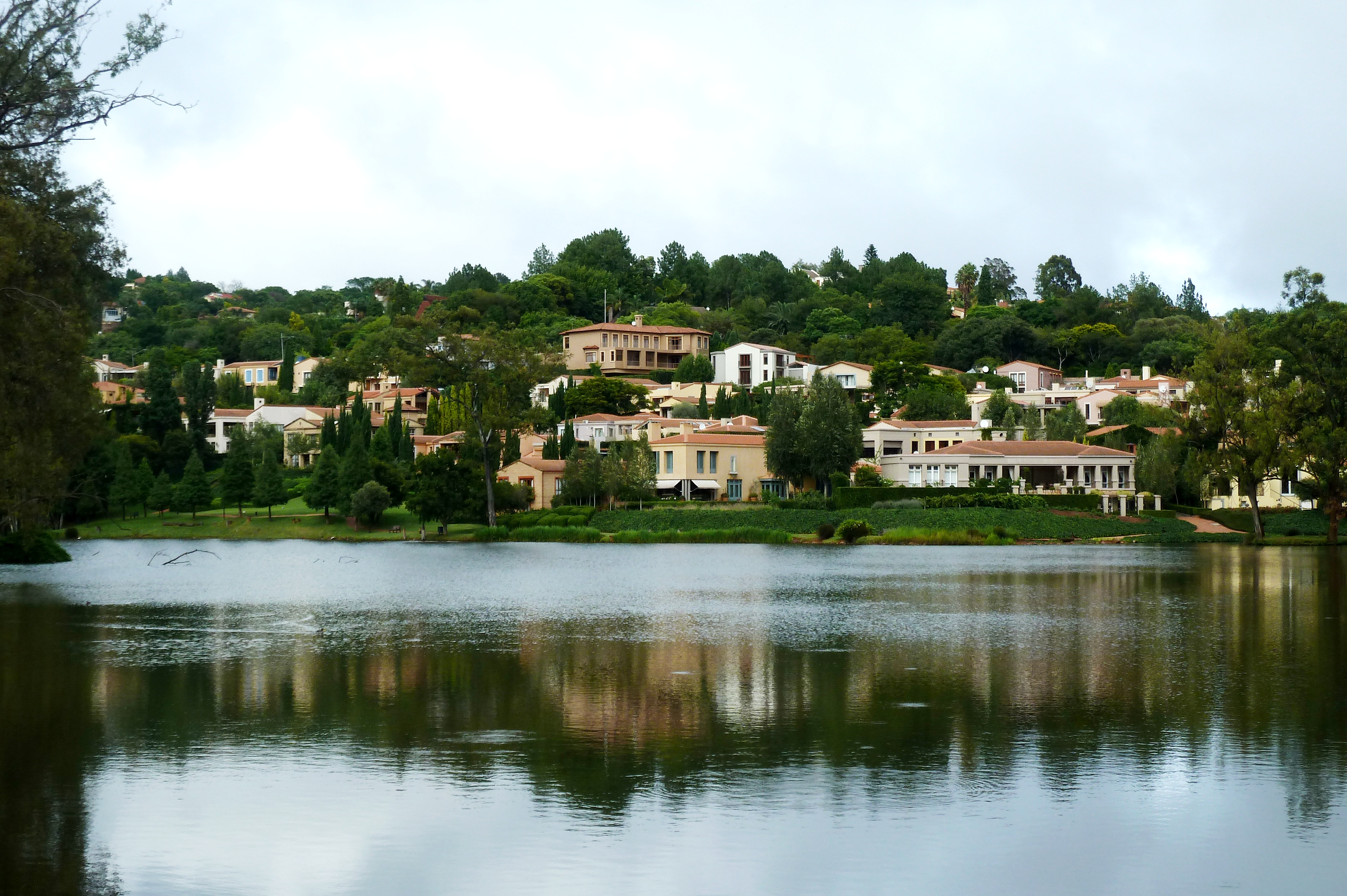
- Waterkloof Village in Waterkloof

- Location within Gauteng Location within South Africa Location within Africa
- Coordinates: 25°46′30″S 28°14′30″E
- Country: South Africa
- Province: Gauteng
- Municipality: City of Tshwane
- Main Place: Pretoria

Area
  - Total: 3.73 km^{2} (1.44 sq mi)

Population (2011)
  - Total: 4,820
  - Density: 1,290/km^{2} (3,350/sq mi)

Racial makeup (2011)
  - Black African: 22.1%
  - Coloured: 1.0%
  - Indian/Asian: 2.5%
  - White: 71.7%
  - Other: 2.7%

First languages (2011)
  - Afrikaans: 44.4%
  - English: 34.4%
  - Tswana: 2.8%
  - Northern Sotho: 2.7%
  - Other: 15.6%
- Time zone: UTC+2 (SAST)
- Postal code (street): 0181
- PO box: 0145

Waterkloof (Afrikaans for "Water Ravine") is an affluent suburb of the city of Pretoria in the Gauteng province of South Africa, located to the east of the city centre. It is named after the original farm that stood there when Pretoria was founded in the 19th Century.

Waterkloof is a highly sought-after area and has some of the city's most expensive real estate, including hilltop homesteads on Edward and Victoria Streets with views of Pretoria. Like many areas of the city, its streets are lined with jacaranda trees. Many streets are named after British royalty; the main thoroughfares are Crown Avenue, which links Waterkloof with the affluent suburb of Brooklyn to its north, and Albert Street, which runs east–west between the neighbouring areas of Menlo Park and Groenkloof.

Several ambassadorial residences are located in Waterkloof. It is the home of soprano Mimi Coertse, and the location of the upmarket Dube-house in the film Tsotsi. Pretoria Country Club, which has an eighteen-hole golf course, is also located in the area.

== Demographics ==
According to the South African National Census of 2001, 38.6% spoke Afrikaans, 37.5% English, 4.9% Tswana, 4.8% Northern Sotho, 3.1% Sotho, 2.0% Zulu, 1.9% Southern Ndebele, 1.2% Tsonga, 0.7% Xhosa, 0.5% Venda, 0.4% Swazi and 4.5% some other language as their first language.

Ethnic group	2001 population	2001 (%)	2011 population	2011 (%)
White	2,892	76.0%	3,455	71.68%
Black African	829	21.8%	1,066	22.12%
Indian or Asian	53	1.4%	120	2.49%
Coloured	27	0.7%	48	1%
Other	4	0.1%	131	2.72%
Total	3,805	100%	4,820	100%

== See also ==
- AFB Waterkloof, an air force base located in Centurion, Gauteng about 5 km south of Waterkloof.
- Hoërskool Waterkloof, large Afrikaans high school situated about 8 km south of Waterkloof between Erasmuskloof and Elardus Park.
