= Lynnwood Ridge =

- Location within Gauteng Location within South Africa
- Coordinates: 25°45′23″S 28°17′20″E
- Country: South Africa
- Province: Gauteng
- Municipality: City of Tshwane
- Main Place: Pretoria

Area
  - Total: 2.13 km^{2} (0.82 sq mi)

Population (2011)
  - Total: 3,463
  - Density: 1,630/km^{2} (4,210/sq mi)

Racial makeup (2011)
  - Black African: 23.2%
  - Coloured: 2.4%
  - Indian/Asian: 4.8%
  - White: 68.2%
  - Other: 1.5%

First languages (2011)
  - Afrikaans: 45.9%
  - English: 35.5%
  - Northern Sotho: 2.1%
  - Xhosa: 2.1%
  - Other: 16.5%
- Time zone: UTC+2 (SAST)
- Postal code (street): 0081
- PO box: 0040

Lynnwood Ridge is a suburb of the city of Pretoria, South Africa. It is a well-developed area, lying to the east of the city centre.

Together with Brooklyn and Menlo Park, it was most likely named after American counterparts. Today these suburbs are known as the old east and have some of the city's most valuable residential properties.
