= Lynnwood, Pretoria =

Lynnwood
- Location within Gauteng Location within South Africa Location within Africa
- Coordinates: 25.76444°S 28.26893°E
- Country: South Africa
- Province: Gauteng
- Municipality: City of Tshwane
- Main Place: Pretoria

Area
  - Total: 3.17 km^{2} (1.22 sq mi)

Population (2011)
  - Total: 6,379
  - Density: 2,010/km^{2} (5,210/sq mi)

Racial makeup (2011)
  - Black African: 18.3%
  - Coloured: 1.3%
  - Indian/Asian: 2.6%
  - White: 75.2%
  - Other: 2.6%

First languages (2011)
  - Afrikaans: 63.6%
  - English: 20.8%
  - Northern Sotho: 2.4%
  - Sotho: 2.3%
  - Other: 10.9%
- Time zone: UTC+2 (SAST)
- Postal code (street): 0081

Lynnwood is a suburb of the city of Pretoria, South Africa. It is a well-developed area, lying to the east of the city centre.

When it was first established in the 1960s, it was the most eastern suburb of Pretoria, but the city has since considerably expanded eastwards and southwards.

Together with Brooklyn and Menlo Park, it was most likely named after American counterparts. Today these suburbs are known as the old east and have some of the city's most valuable residential properties.
