= Faerie Glen =

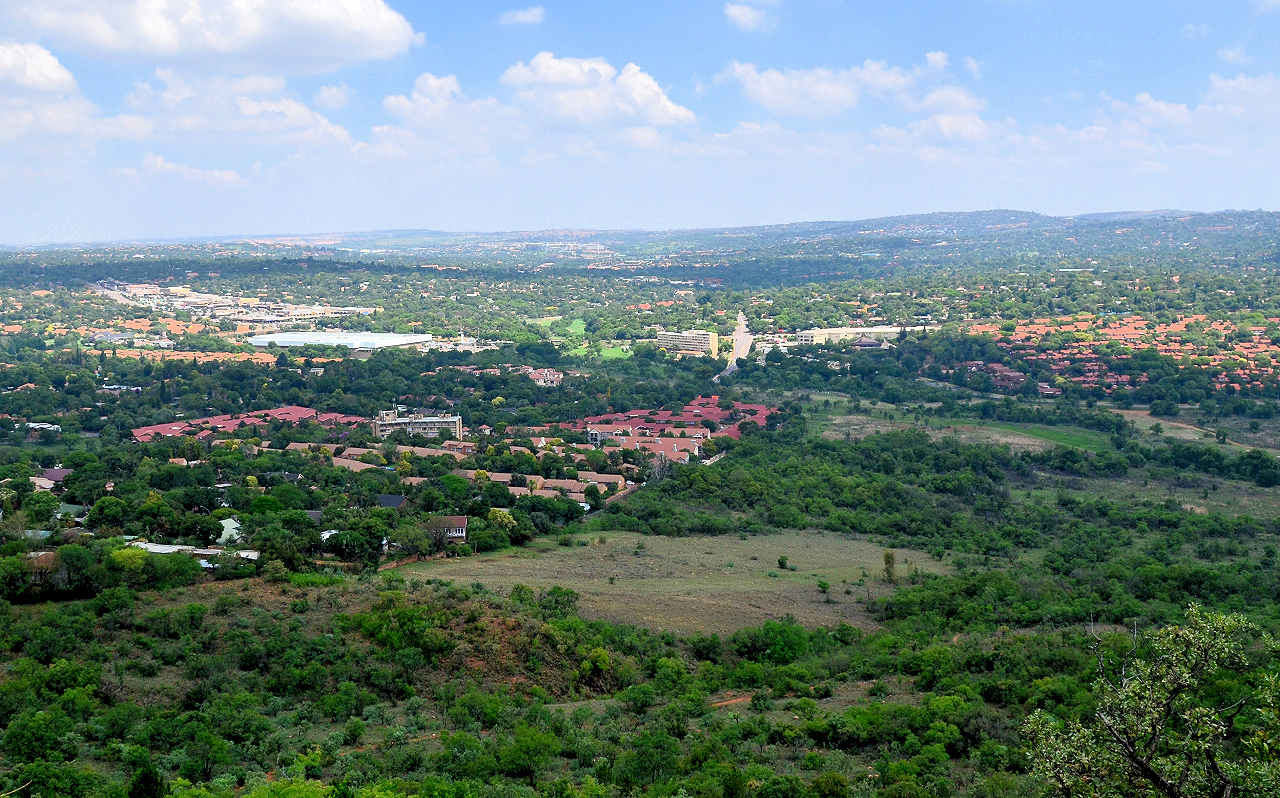
- View over Faerie Glen

- Location within Gauteng Location within South Africa Location within Africa
- Coordinates: 25°47′16″S 28°19′0″E
- Country: South Africa
- Province: Gauteng
- Municipality: City of Tshwane
- Main Place: Pretoria

Area
  - Total: 8.32 km^{2} (3.21 sq mi)

Population (2011)
  - Total: 20,444
  - Density: 2,460/km^{2} (6,360/sq mi)

Racial makeup (2011)
  - Black African: 17.1%
  - Coloured: 1.5%
  - Indian/Asian: 1.8%
  - White: 78.0%
  - Other: 1.6%

First languages (2011)
  - Afrikaans: 60.1%
  - English: 24.6%
  - Northern Sotho: 2.0%
  - Sotho: 1.9%
  - Other: 11.4%
- Time zone: UTC+2 (SAST)
- Postal code (street): 0081
- PO box: 0043
- Area code: 012

Faerie Glen is a large suburb of the city of Pretoria, South Africa. It is a well-developed area, lying to the east of the city centre and adjacent to the Faerie Glen Nature Reserve.

When it was first established in 1974, it was the most eastern suburb of Pretoria, but the city has since considerably expanded eastwards and southwards.
