= Waterkloof Glen =

- Location within Gauteng Location within South Africa
- Coordinates: 25°47′45″S 28°16′50″E
- Country: South Africa
- Province: Gauteng
- Municipality: City of Tshwane
- Main Place: Pretoria

Area
  - Total: 2.35 km^{2} (0.91 sq mi)

Population (2011)
  - Total: 4,083
  - Density: 1,740/km^{2} (4,500/sq mi)

Racial makeup (2011)
  - Black African: 27.0%
  - Coloured: 1.9%
  - Indian/Asian: 2.4%
  - White: 66.2%
  - Other: 2.6%

First languages (2011)
  - Afrikaans: 46.9%
  - English: 29.7%
  - Northern Sotho: 2.9%
  - Zulu: 2.8%
  - Other: 17.7%
- Time zone: UTC+2 (SAST)
- Postal code (street): 0181
- PO box: 0010

Waterkloof Glen is a suburb of the city of Pretoria, South Africa. It is located in a leafy, established area, with Constantia Park, Garsfontein and Menlyn as neighbouring suburbs.

== Notable places ==
- The Glen High School, a public, English medium high school situated in Waterkloof Glen.
- Menlyn Maine, a green city that mostly forms part of Waterkloof Glen.
