= Menlyn =

- Location within Gauteng Location within South Africa
- Coordinates: 25°47′0.343″S 28°16′38.897″E
- Country: South Africa
- Province: Gauteng
- Municipality: City of Tshwane
- Main Place: Pretoria

Area
  - Total: 0.56 km^{2} (0.22 sq mi)

Population (2011)
  - Total: 491
  - Density: 880/km^{2} (2,300/sq mi)

Racial makeup (2011)
  - Black African: 54.18%
  - White: 18.74%
  - Indian/Asian: 4.28%
  - Coloured: 3.26%
  - Other: 19.55%

First languages (2011)
  - English: 38.59%
  - Afrikaans: 16.24%
  - Xhosa: 12.24%
  - Zulu: 5.41%
  - Other: 27.52%
- Time zone: UTC+2 (SAST)
- Postal code (street): 0181
- PO box: 0063

Menlyn is an affluent suburb of the city of Pretoria, South Africa. It includes the Menlyn Park Shopping Centre and the Menlyn Maine Central Square.

== Menlyn Maine ==
Menlyn Maine is a mixed-use development in the Menlyn and Waterkloof Glen suburbs of Pretoria and is Africa's first green city. It is a 315,000 sq mi (820,000 km^{2}) precinct that incorporates office, retail, residential, and hotel spaces, alongside amenities like a public park, originally valued at R8 billion. It has contributed to the decentralization of the Pretoria city centre and surrounding suburbs.

The Menlyn Maine development was introduced in 2006, with the initial private developers (MMIH - Menlyn Maine Investment Holdings) purchasing 104 residential properties in Waterkloof Glen Extension 2 in order to assemble the land for this green mini-city project. It was one of the 16 green cities participating in the Climate Positive Development Program by the Clinton Foundation, a program introduced in May 2009 which works together with businesses and governments to improve energy efficiency in urban areas. It is a mini-city in which offices, retail spaces and residential areas are all near one another, ensuring that work and leisure can be experienced from the same environment. The green city includes a Sun International hotel and residential apartments.

On 21 September 2016, the 65,000 sq mi (170,000 km^{2}) Menlyn Maine Central Square was opened by David Makhura, the Premier of Gauteng, within the green city. It was built at a cost of R1.8 billion at the heart of the Menlyn Maine development and was co-owned by Menlyn Maine Investment Holdings (MMIH) and the Government Employees Pension Fund (GEPF). It includes a mall with supermarkets, banks, restaurants and a Virgin Active gym among other services. WBHO was the main contactor in the project.

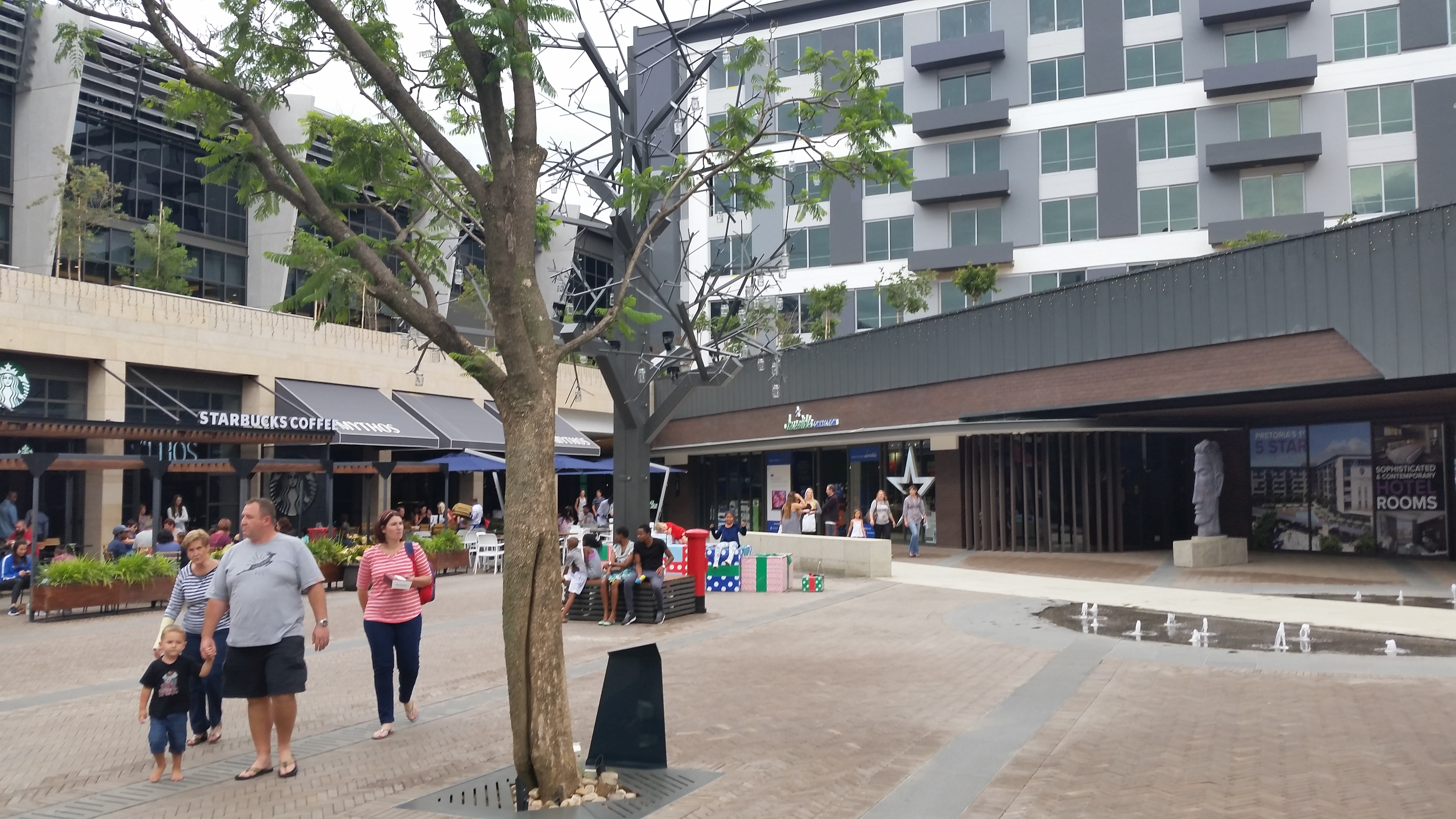
Menlyn Maine Central Square

In July 2014, Sun International made a R4.2 billion investment in Menlyn Maine for a hotel, casino and arena, with construction beginning in April 2015. The Times Square Casino was opened on 1 April 2017, followed by the SunBet Arena on 4 November 2017 (with a capacity of 8,500 people) and the 17-storey Maslow Times Square Hotel in April 2018.

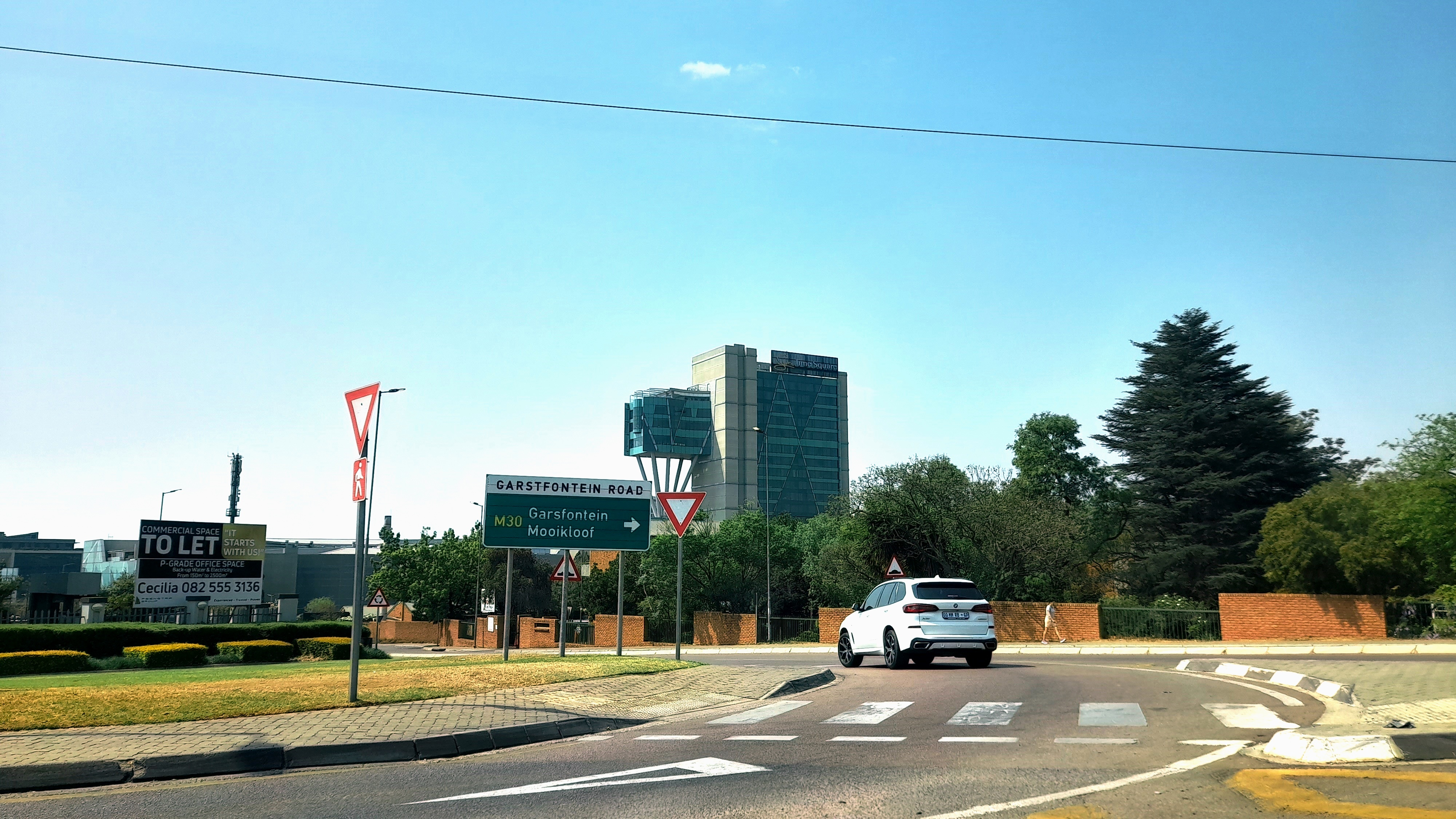
The Times Square building seen from Garstfontein Road.

On 29 July 2021, it was reported that the Competition Tribunal approved a proposed merger between the Government Employees Pension Fund (GEPF) and Menlyn Maine Investment Holdings (MMIH), which would give the GEPF sole control over the MMIH's share of the Menlyn Maine Central Square.
