= Queenswood =

- Coordinates: 25°44′46″S 28°11′17″E
- Country: South Africa
- Province: Gauteng
- Municipality: City of Tshwane
- Main Place: Pretoria

Area
  - Land: 2.62 km^{2} (1.01 sq mi)

Population (2011)
  - Total: 6,515

Racial Makeup (2011)
  - White: 74,23%
  - Black: 18,91%
  - Coloured: 2,67%
  - Others: 4%

First Languages (2011)
  - Afrikaans: 58,18%
  - English: 29,12%
  - Setswana: 2,10%
  - Others: 11%

Queenswood is a suburb in the northeast of Pretoria in Gauteng, South Africa. It is bordered by Villieria to the north and Hatfield to the south.

Queenswood is home to the Eduplex Pre-School, Eduplex Primary School and Eduplex High School as well as the Laerskool Queenswood.
