= Constantia Park =

- Location within Gauteng Location within South Africa Location within Africa
- Coordinates: 25.802222°S 28.286944°E
- Country: South Africa
- Province: Gauteng
- Municipality: City of Tshwane
- Main Place: Pretoria

Area
  - Total: 1.90 km^{2} (0.73 sq mi)

Population (2011)
  - Total: 3,547
  - Density: 1,870/km^{2} (4,840/sq mi)

Racial makeup (2011)
  - Black African: 20.0%
  - Coloured: 3.5%
  - Indian/Asian: 3.2%
  - White: 71.6%
  - Other: 1.8%

First languages (2011)
  - Afrikaans: 55.8%
  - English: 30.1%
  - Xhosa: 2.5%
  - Sotho: 1.8%
  - Other: 9.8%
- Time zone: UTC+2 (SAST)
- Postal code (street): 0181
- PO box: 0010

Constantia Park (Afrikaans: Constantiapark) is a residential suburb in the city of Pretoria in the Gauteng province of South Africa. It borders other upmarket areas like Erasmuskloof, Garsfontein and Waterkloof Glen.

Constantia Park is positioned near the N1 highway and major shopping malls Menlyn Park, Menlyn Retail Park, coffee bars, restaurants, cafés and Constantiapark Library. It is the site of Constantia Park Primary School, Laerskool Constantiapark and lies only 6 km from the University of Pretoria.
