= Wapadrand =

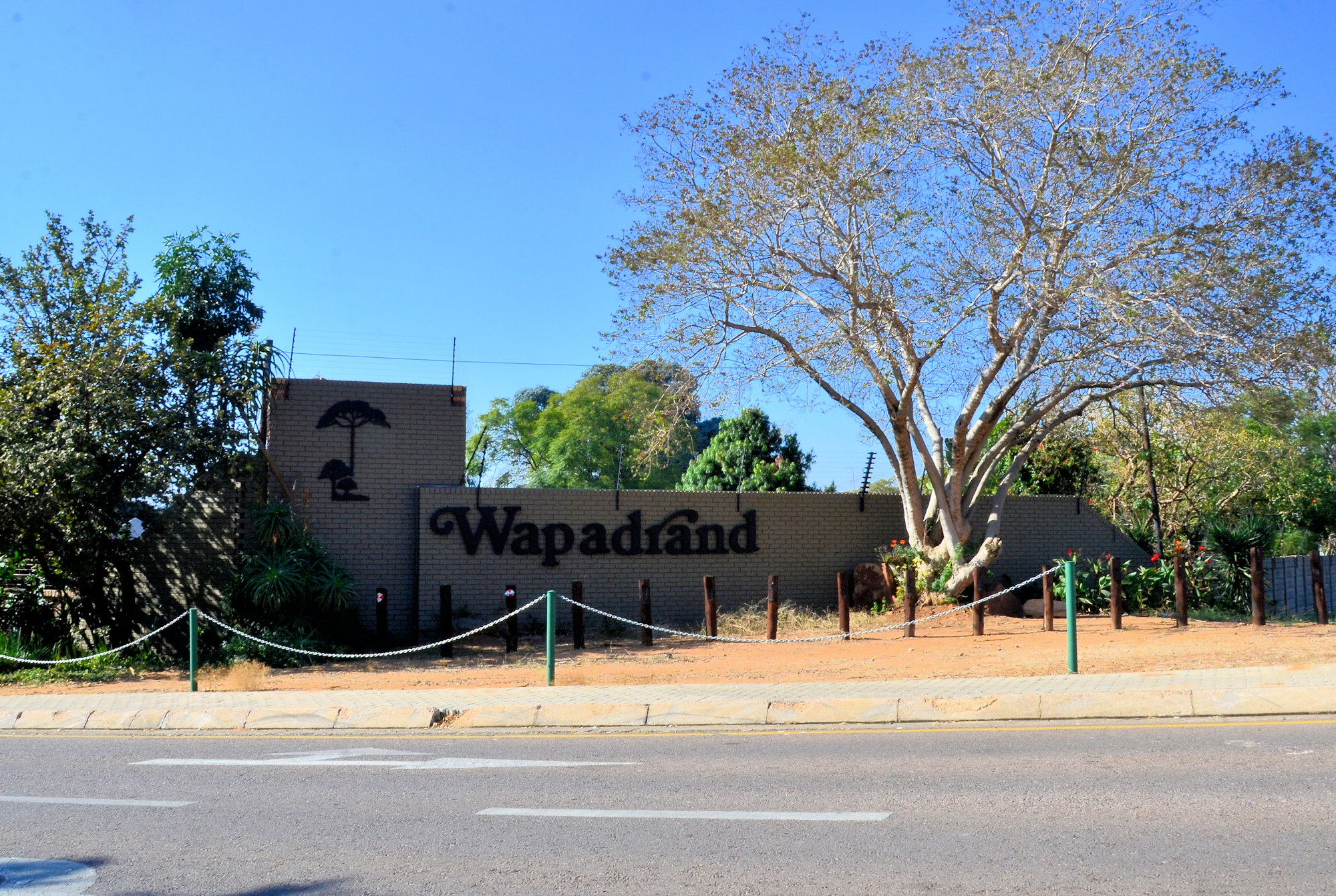
- One of the few entrances to Wapadrand

- Location within Gauteng Location within South Africa
- Coordinates: 25.781°S 28.339°E
- Country: South Africa
- Province: Gauteng
- Municipality: City of Tshwane
- Main Place: Pretoria

Area
  - Total: 4.79 km^{2} (1.85 sq mi)

Population (2011)
  - Total: 3,743
  - Density: 781/km^{2} (2,020/sq mi)

Racial makeup (2011)
  - Black African: 16.4%
  - Coloured: 1.7%
  - Indian/Asian: 2.5%
  - White: 77.2%
  - Other: 2.1%

First languages (2011)
  - Afrikaans: 65.3%
  - English: 20.8%
  - Northern Sotho: 2.4%
  - Sotho: 1.8%
  - Other: 9.7%
- Time zone: UTC+2 (SAST)
- Postal code (street): 0081
- PO box: 0050

Wapadrand is a suburb of the city of Pretoria, South Africa. Located to the east of Lynnwood in a leafy, established area that is home to some affordable real estate.

The neighborhood was named after old wagon ruts in the Bronberg area at the suggestion of one of its founders, the architect Koos Reyneke.
