= Menlyn Park =

Shopping centre in Pretoria, South Africa

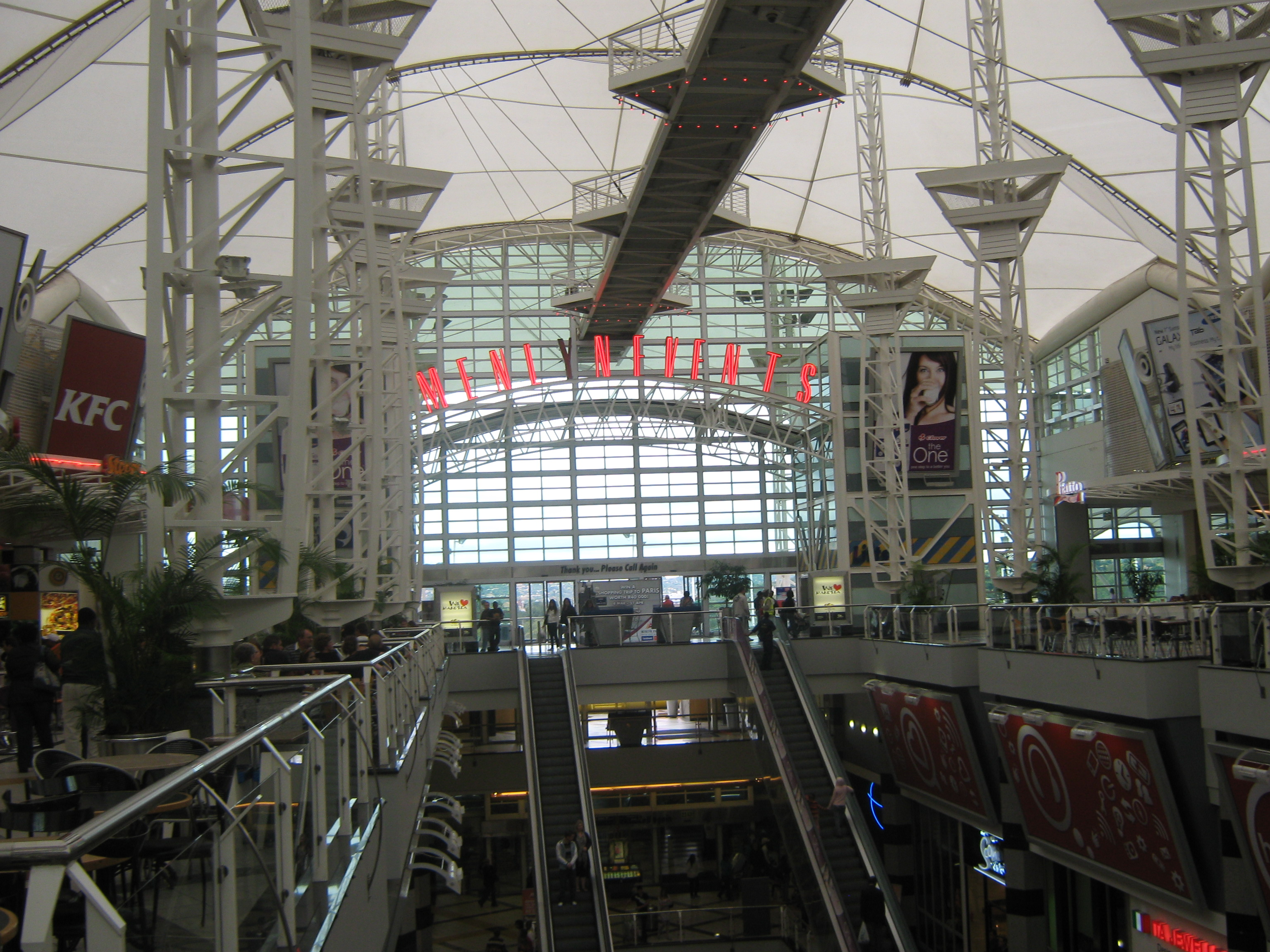

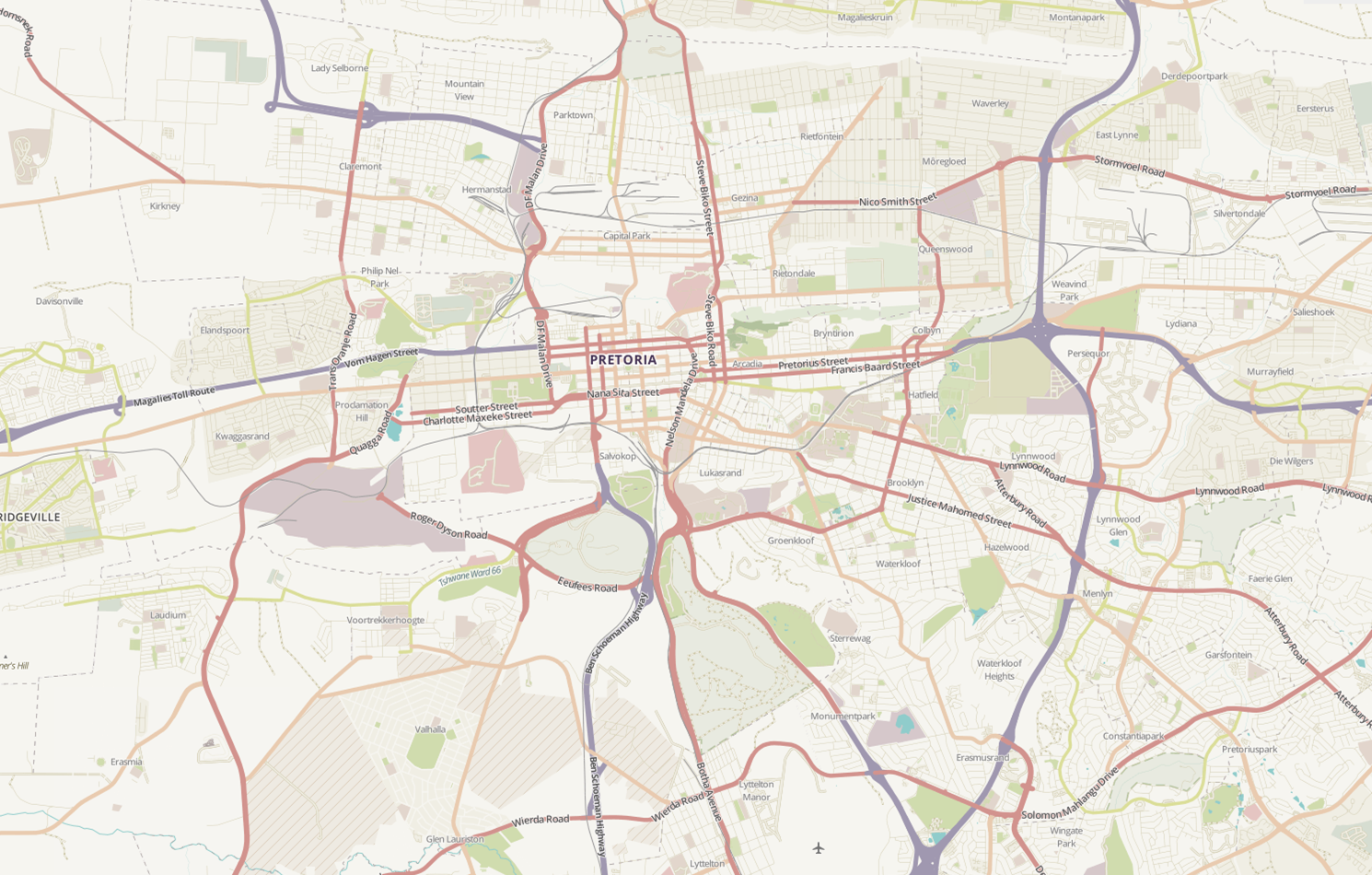
- Location within Pretoria Location within Gauteng
- Alternative names: Menlyn Menlass

General information
- Location: Pretoria, South Africa
- Coordinates: 25°46′59″S 28°16′31″E
- Construction started: 1979
- Renovated: 1998, 2000, 2016

Height
- Top floor: UF (Upper Floor Shopping Level)

Technical details
- Floor count: 3 (Shopping Levels)
- Floor area: 177,000 m^{2} (1,910,000 sq ft)

Design and construction
- Architecture firm: BILD Architects
- Civil engineer: Concor Buildings

Other information
- Number of stores: ±500 outlets

Website
- menlynpark.co.za

Menlyn Park Shopping Centre is a large shopping mall in Menlyn, Pretoria, South Africa, owned by development company Pareto. It is designed around three spaces – the Food Court, the keyhole malls and focal points, and a large internal garden square surrounded by restaurants. Menlyn Park has a total lettable floor space of 177,000m², over 500 stores, 16 parking entrances, 12 parking exits and 8,250 parking bays. It is situated at the corner of Lois Avenue and Atterbury Road, close to the passing N1 highway (Pretoria Eastern Bypass).

== History ==
Menlyn Park Shopping Centre, named after the suburb in which it is located, was originally built in 1979. It was transformed and expanded in 1988 by Bild Architects. Menlyn Park used to be the property of Old Mutual Properties from London, England, but is currently owned by Pareto Limited, a shopping centre investment firm wholly owned by the Public Investment Corporation. Since its inception, Menlyn Park has undergone a number of renovations.

=== First redesign ===
In 1998, an American design firm, Development Design Group, designed Menlyn's unique appearance. Menlyn Park had over 300 stores and 37 restaurants as well as a rooftop Drive In Theatre and a Nu Metro cineplex.

=== Expansion ===
In 2000, the mall underwent another expansion, increasing the floor space to 118,253m² and the store number to 300.

=== Modernisation and refurbishment ===
November 2016 saw the completion of another major expansion, which increased the floor area to approximately 177,000m² with 500 shops in total. The R2,5-billion, two-year phased refurbishment has converted the site to become the regional shopping centre in Tshwane. BILD Architects and Terra Ether Architects designed the new structure while Concor Construction executed the works.

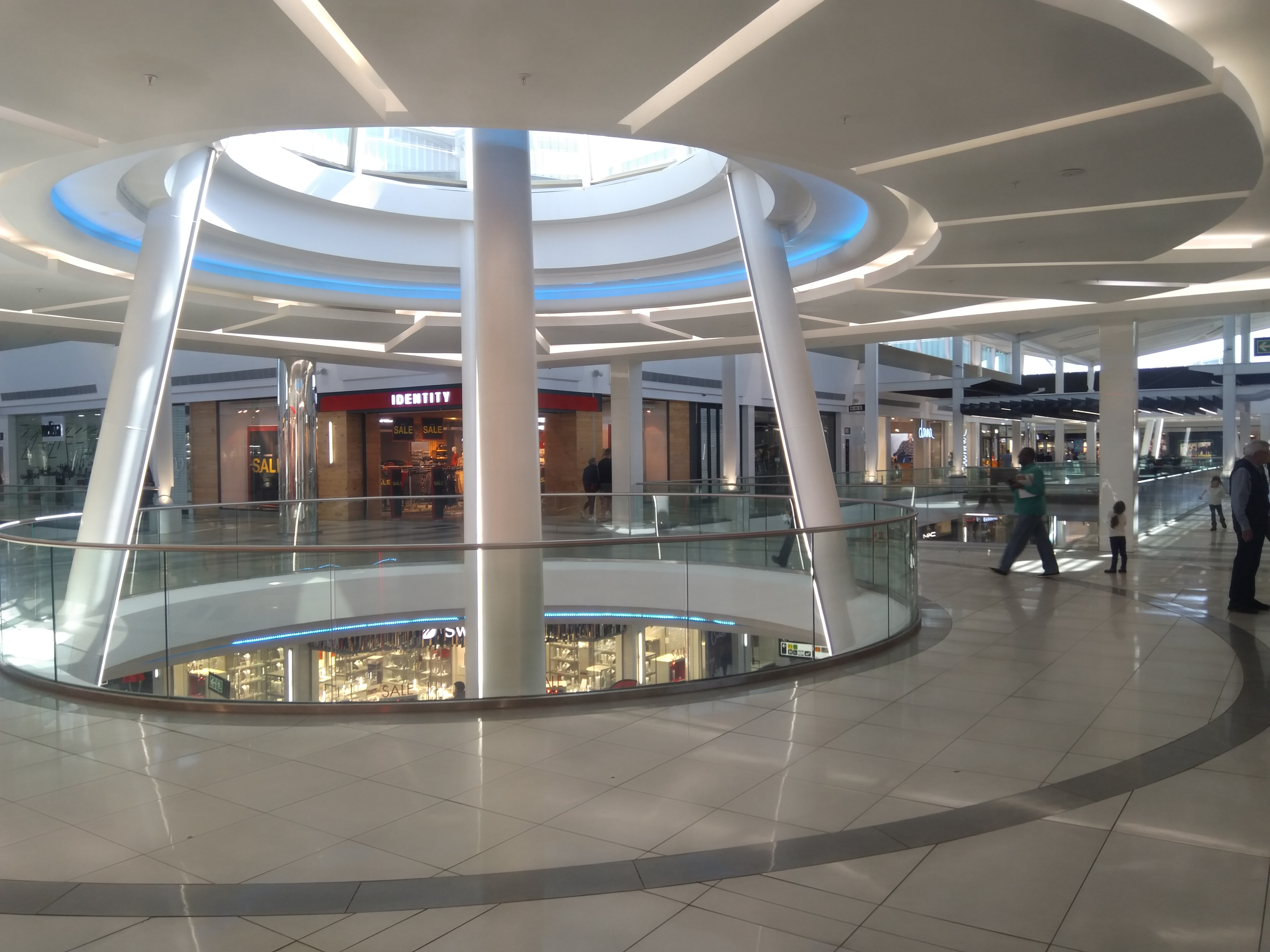
Refurbished Menlyn Mall 2018

The new building attained a 4-star Green Star Retail Design rating by the Green Building Council of South Africa (GBCSA) for the efforts to develop the first building phase of the redevelopment along environmentally friendly design and construction principles
