= Groenkloof =

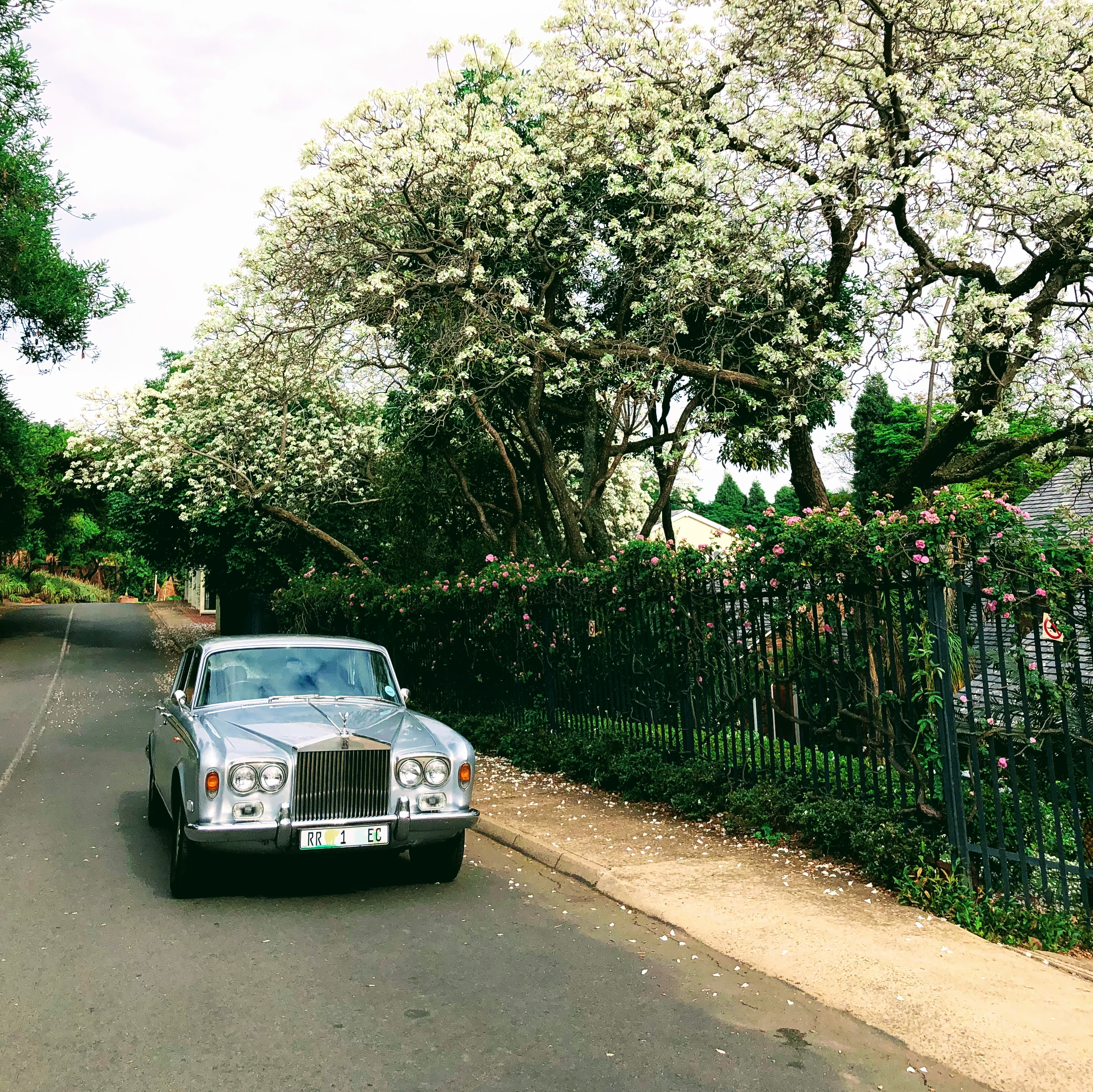
- Unique in South Africa: white albino jacaranda trees on Herbert Baker Street

- Location within Gauteng Location within South Africa Location within Africa
- Coordinates: 25.775108°S 28.217957°E
- Country: South Africa
- Province: Gauteng
- Municipality: City of Tshwane
- Main Place: Pretoria

Area
  - Total: 2.83 km^{2} (1.09 sq mi)

Population (2011)
  - Total: 4,946
  - Density: 1,750/km^{2} (4,530/sq mi)

Racial makeup (2011)
  - Black African: 33.7%
  - Coloured: 2.9%
  - Indian/Asian: 2.4%
  - White: 59.4%
  - Other: 1.7%

First languages (2011)
  - Afrikaans: 44.2%
  - English: 40.5%
  - Northern Sotho: 3.2%
  - Tswana: 3.2%
  - Other: 9.0%
- Time zone: UTC+2 (SAST)
- Postal code (street): 0181
- PO box: 0027

Groenkloof (Afrikaans for 'Green ravine') is a residential suburb of Pretoria, South Africa.

This wealthy suburb in Pretoria is famous for its white Jacaranda trees. It is close to the city centre, and to the well-known Brooklyn Square and Menlyn Park shopping centres. The University of Pretoria main campus is only 3 km drive and it is a few minutes from the N14 freeway linking Pretoria and Johannesburg (via the N1).

The suburb lies between Koningin Wilhelmina Avenue to the east, George Storrar Avenue to the north and Fort Klapperkop to the south. Herbert Baker and van Wouw streets are some of the well-known streets in the area and home to some of the city's wealthiest residents.

== Groenkloof Safety Initiative ==
The Groenkloof Safety Initiative, GSI, is a community effort to reduce crime inside the suburb. The initiative was founded in 2007 after a meeting of the Groenkloof Policing Forum. GSI works in partnership with the SAPS as well as private security companies in the area. One of the main services of the GSI is conveying information of recent crimes as well as suspicious activity in the area. This is done through SMSes as well as a Facebook page. Public meetings for the residents are also held regularly. Currently underway is a Monitored Access Project which aims to restrict the movement of criminals in and out of Groenkloof. As of 11 December 2014, the monitored access project is viable with submission target 30 January 2015 pending the expected approval of the Japanese Embassy.

== Photo gallery ==
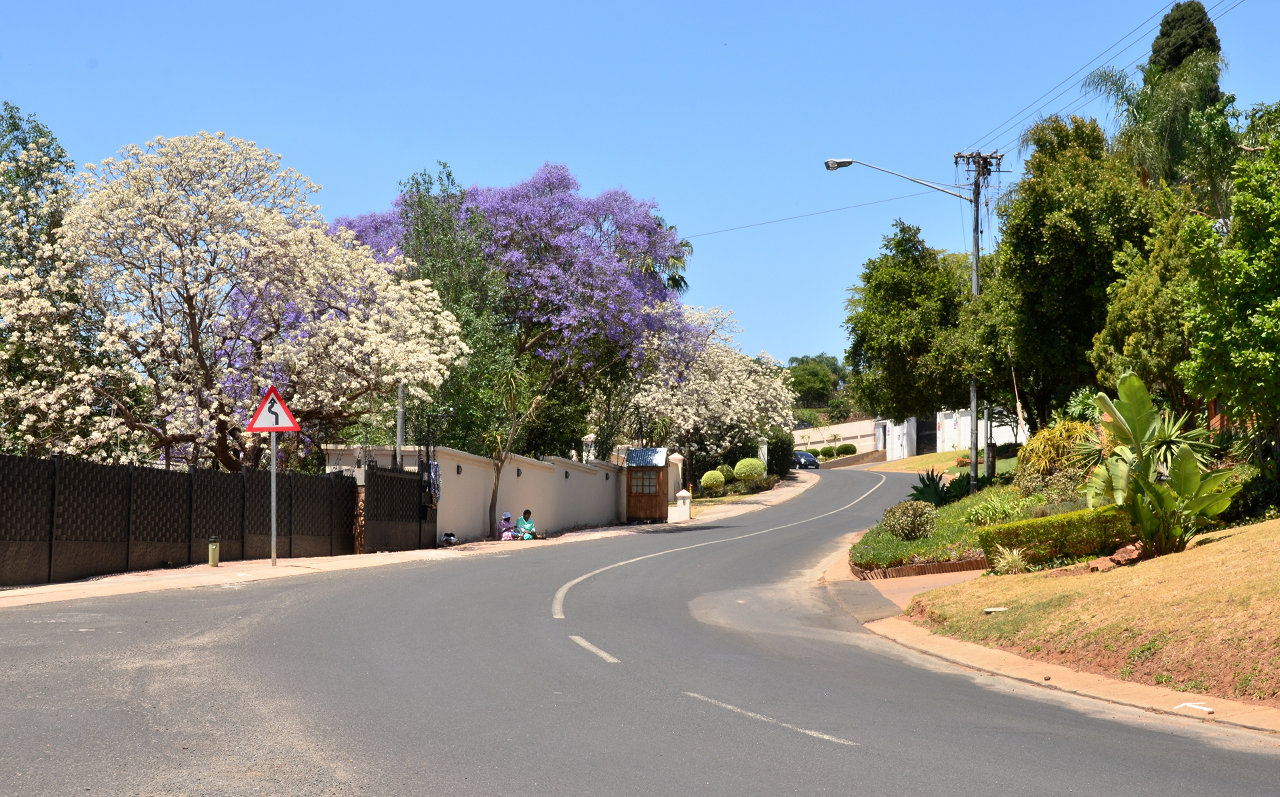
White jacarandas in Herbert Baker Street, Groenkloof

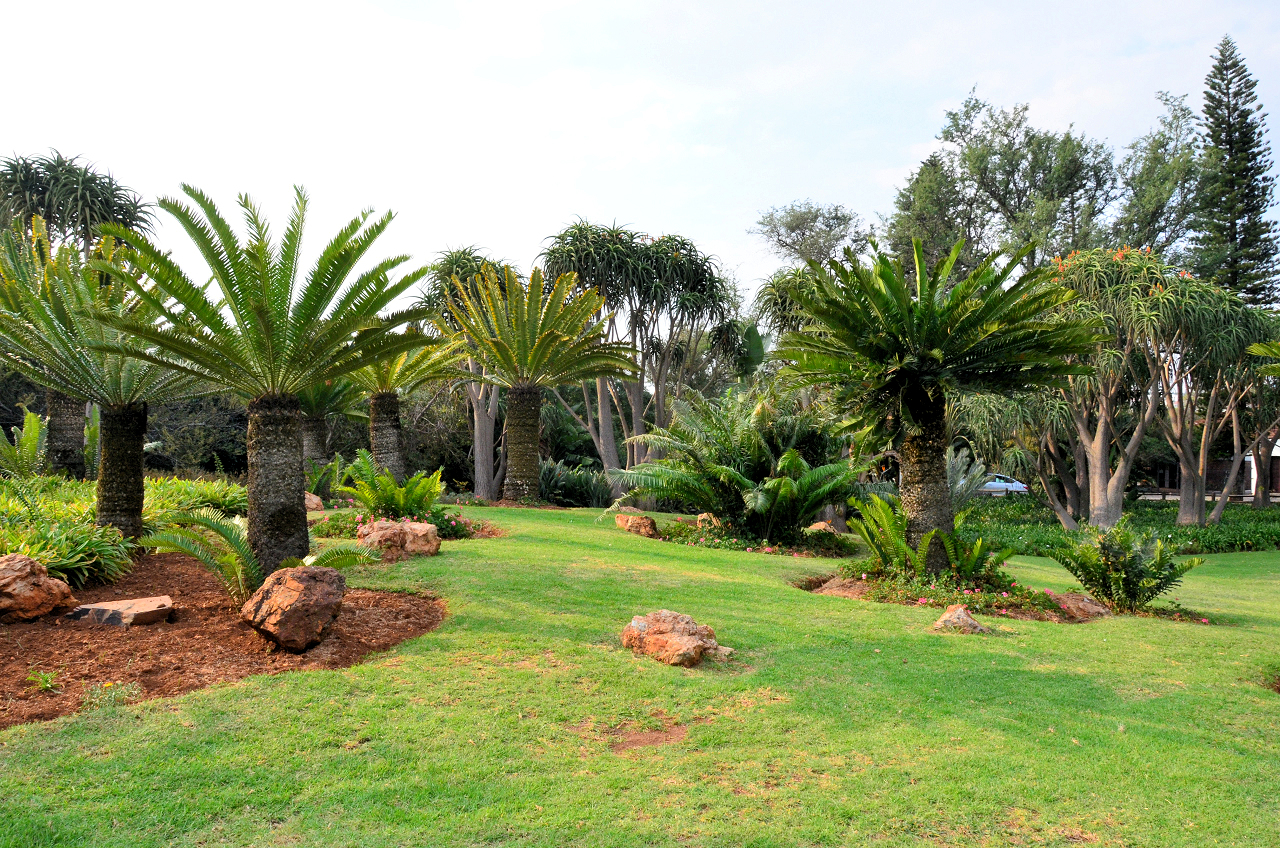
Jan Celliers Park in Groenkloof

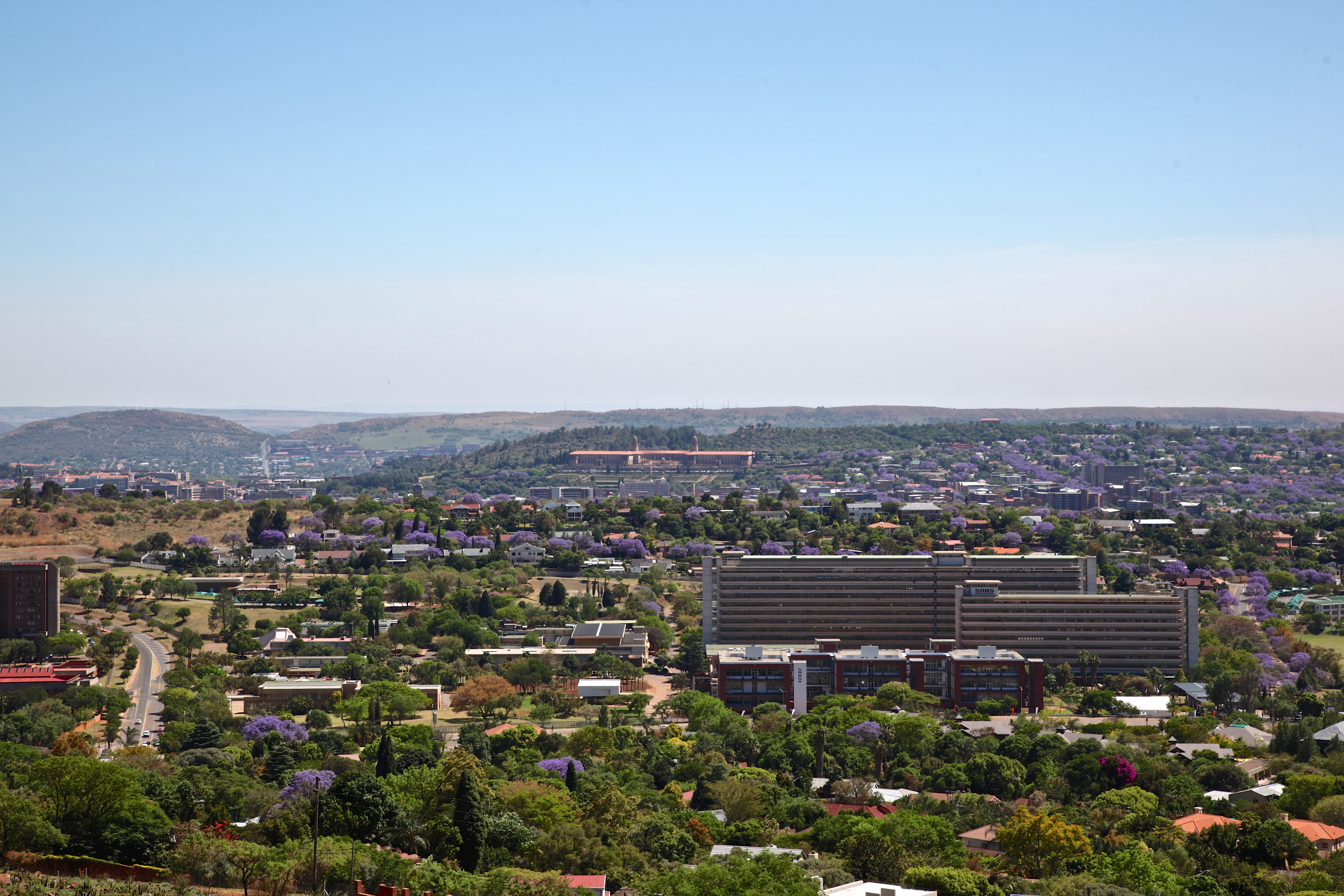
View from Fort Klapperkop towards the north of Pretoria
