= Moreleta Park =

- Location within Gauteng Location within South Africa Location within Africa
- Coordinates: 25°49′30″S 28°17′30″E
- Country: South Africa
- Province: Gauteng
- Municipality: City of Tshwane
- Main Place: Pretoria

Area
  - Total: 10.01 km^{2} (3.86 sq mi)

Population (2011)
  - Total: 27,539
  - Density: 2,751/km^{2} (7,125/sq mi)

Racial makeup (2011)
  - Black African: 22.1%
  - Coloured: 1.6%
  - Indian/Asian: 1.8%
  - White: 73.7%
  - Other: 0.8%

First languages (2011)
  - Afrikaans: 62.9%
  - English: 20.8%
  - Tswana: 2.7%
  - Zulu: 2.6%
  - Other: 11.1%
- Time zone: UTC+2 (SAST)
- Website: https://www.moreletapark.co.za/

Moreleta Park (Afrikaans: Moreletapark) is a suburb of Pretoria in the City of Tshwane Metropolitan Municipality in Gauteng, South Africa, situated 12 kilometres (7 mi) southeast of the city centre. According to the 2011 census, it has a population of 27,539.

The Moreleta Kloof Nature Reserve contains African wild life; zebras, springbok and other small antelope and ostriches may be observed. Entrance is free of charge.

== Name and History ==
Moreleta is situated on and was eventually a sub-division of one of the first farms in Pretoria, owned by Daniel Erasmus. His daughter's name was Aletta (Letta) Erasmus, and she used to do the washing in the river running through their farm, now known as Moreleta Spruit (spruit means small river in Afrikaans). As Letta used to do washing by the river passers by used to greet her "Môre Letta" (‘Good morning Letta’ in Afrikaans), and that is according to folklore how Moreleta got its name.
