= Sunnyside, Pretoria =

Sunnyside
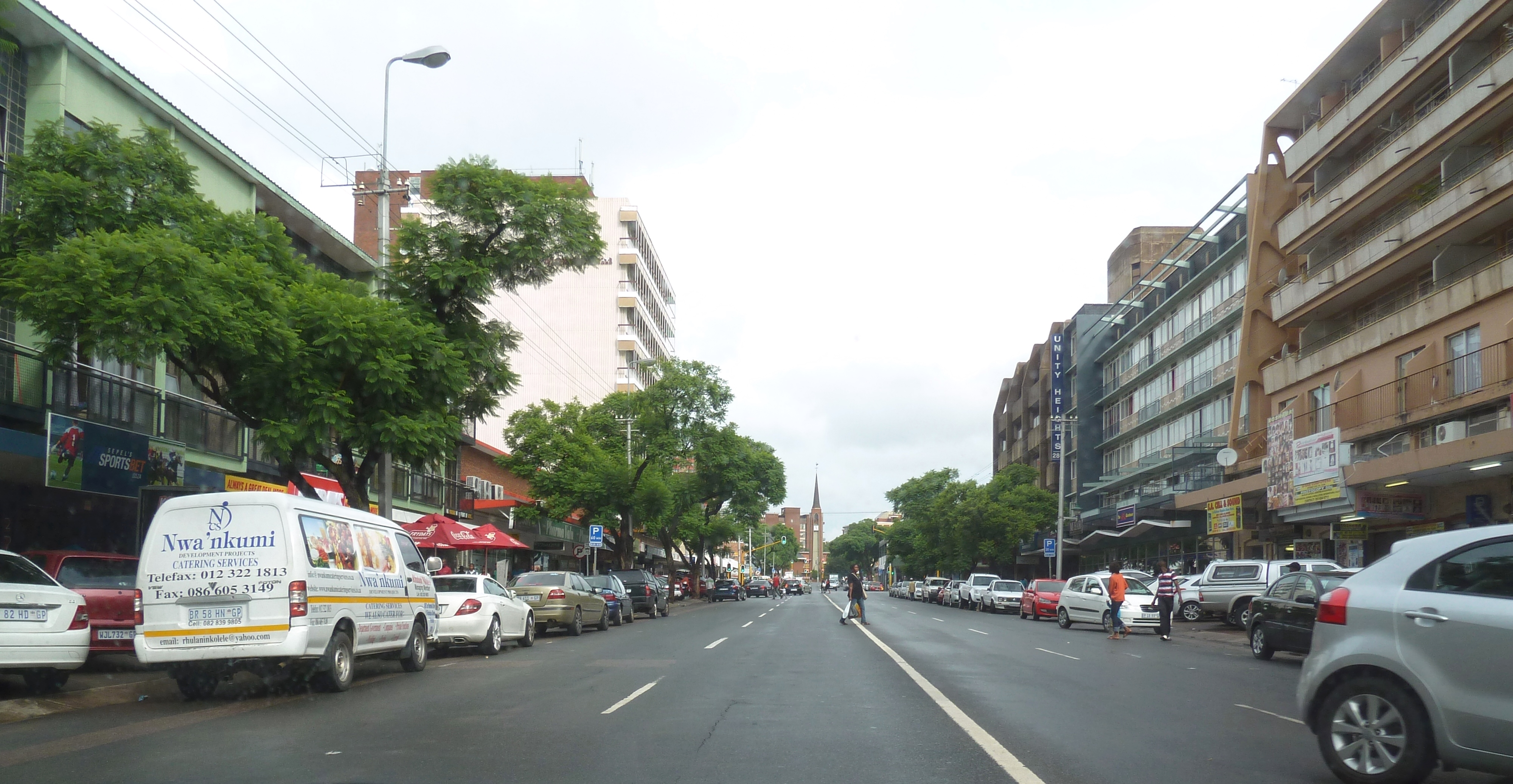
- Robert Sobukwe street in Sunnyside, 2013, was renamed from Esselen street in 2012.
- Interactive map of Sunnyside
- Location within Gauteng Location within South Africa
- Coordinates: 25°45′15″S 28°12′34″E
- Country: South Africa
- Province: Gauteng
- Municipality: City of Tshwane
- Main Place: Pretoria

Area
  - Total: 2.25 km^{2} (0.87 sq mi)

Population (2011)
  - Total: 39,282
  - Density: 17,500/km^{2} (45,200/sq mi)

Racial makeup (2011)
  - Black African: 88.4%
  - Coloured: 1.7%
  - Indian/Asian: 0.9%
  - White: 8.5%
  - Other: 0.6%

First languages (2011)
  - English: 15.9%
  - Northern Sotho: 13.7%
  - Venda: 9.9%
  - Setswana: 8.7%
  - Zulu: 7.5%
  - Xitsonga: 6.6%
  - Afrikaans: 6.1%
  - Other: 31.5%
- Time zone: UTC+2 (SAST)
- PO box: 9585

Sunnyside is one of the oldest suburbs of the city of Pretoria, South Africa. The well-established area is situated east of Nelson Mandela drive (and the Apies River), adjacent to Pretoria Central.

== Development ==
Sunnyside of the late 19th and early 20th century was a suburb of houses and mansions. Esselen street was named after Ewald Auguste Esselen, the State Attorney of the South African Republic from 1894 to 1895. Since 2012 the street has been renamed to Robert Sobukwe street. The character of the suburb changed with the influx of mainly Afrikaners to Pretoria during the middle to late 20th century, when blocks of high-rise flats transformed the western section. The one time house of the writer and poet Jan F. E. Celliers however survived until 1970.

The suburb now consists mostly of high density residential developments, which in the 21st century ranges from reasonably upmarket to dilapidated. Esselen street is flanked by a strip of retail businesses, restaurants and clubs. The day time street scene is very busy, with heavy pedestrian traffic and hawkers peddling food or wares on street corners. Student residences or communes and residential houses are situated in the quieter eastern part. Like much of the inner city, this suburb's retail, entertainment and nightlife area has become less upmarket since the 1980s, and rundown and dirty in places.

== Demographics ==
The post-Apartheid era saw an influx of local and foreign people of different races to the high density residential areas, which they found affordable. Consequently, a number of languages are now spoken here. The social evils of crime and substance abuse have necessitated beefed up security at all residences, the inhabitants of which are often living in impoverished conditions.

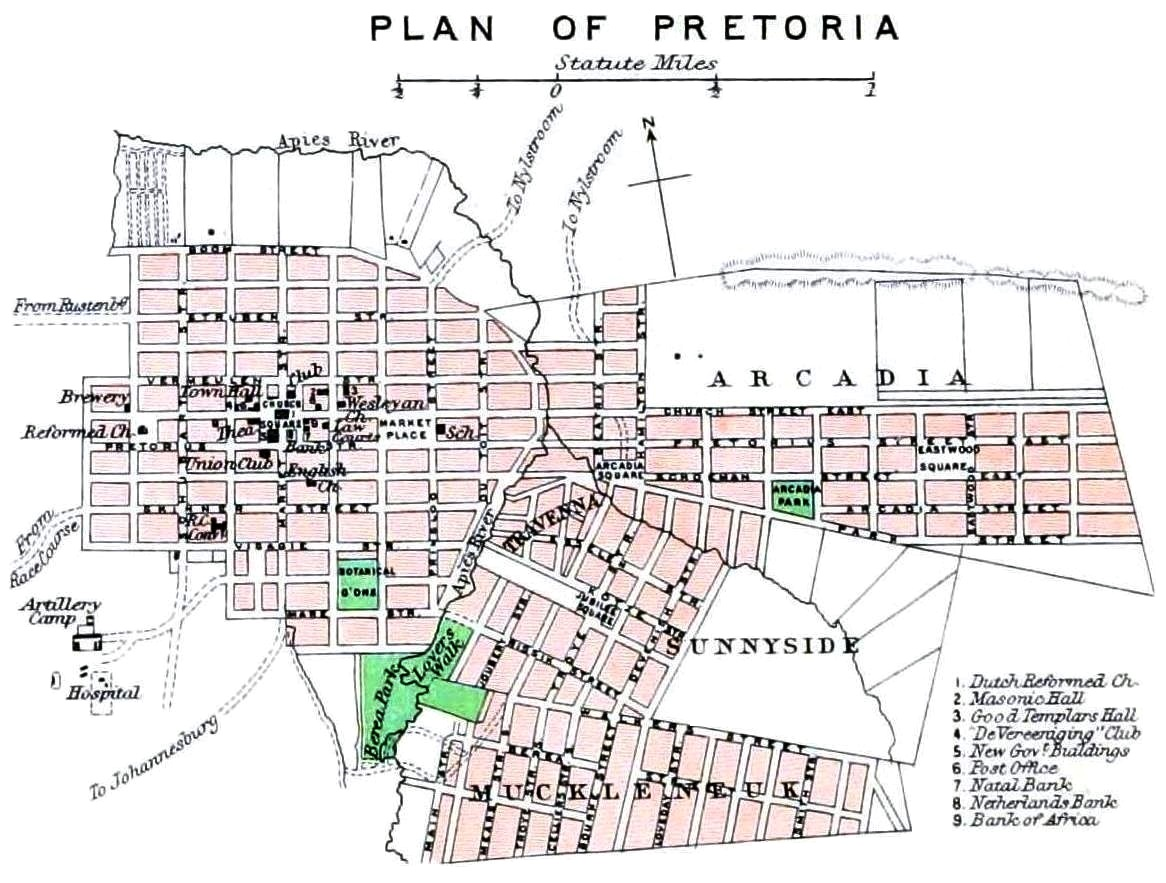
Sunnyside on a map of 1895
