= Elardus Park =

- Location within Gauteng Location within South Africa Location within Africa
- Coordinates: 25°49′39″S 28°15′33″E
- Country: South Africa
- Province: Gauteng
- Municipality: City of Tshwane
- Main Place: Pretoria

Area
  - Total: 3.81 km^{2} (1.47 sq mi)

Population (2011)
  - Total: 10,870
  - Density: 2,850/km^{2} (7,390/sq mi)

Racial makeup (2011)
  - Black African: 16.7%
  - Coloured: 1.6%
  - Indian/Asian: 1.9%
  - White: 78.4%
  - Other: 1.4%

First languages (2011)
  - Afrikaans: 70.1%
  - English: 17.1%
  - Tswana: 2.2%
  - Northern Sotho: 2.2%
  - Other: 8.5%
- Time zone: UTC+2 (SAST)

Elardus Park (Afrikaans: Elarduspark) is a residential suburb of the city of Pretoria, South Africa. It is located to the south of Waterkloof Ridge in a leafy, established area that is home to the city's medium expensive real estate.

== Education ==
Elardus Park houses a primary school named Laerskool Elarduspark, serving as an Afrikaans speaking school.

== See also ==
- AFB Waterkloof, an air force base located west of Elardus Park in Centurion, Gauteng.
- Hoërskool Waterkloof, a large Afrikaans High School situated between Erasmuskloof and Elardus Park.
