= Brooklyn, Pretoria =

Brooklyn
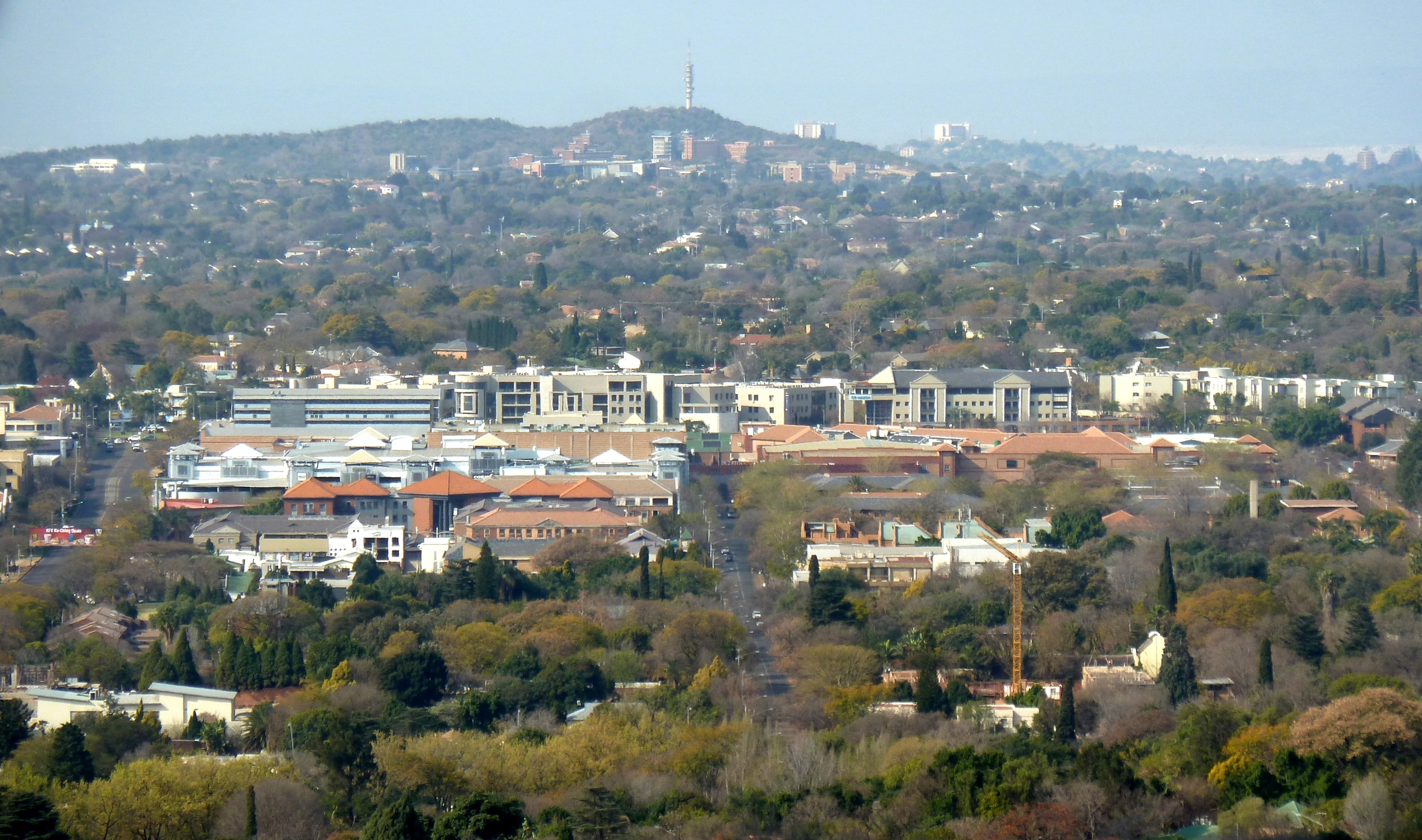
- Nieuw Muckleneuk and Brooklyn suburbs

- Location within Gauteng Location within South Africa Location within Africa
- Coordinates: 25.770117°S 28.236570°E
- Country: South Africa
- Province: Gauteng
- Municipality: City of Tshwane
- Main Place: Pretoria
- Established: 1902

Area
  - Total: 2.56 km^{2} (0.99 sq mi)

Population (2011)
  - Total: 4,177
  - Density: 1,630/km^{2} (4,230/sq mi)

Racial makeup (2011)
  - Black African: 18.8%
  - Coloured: 1.6%
  - Indian/Asian: 2.2%
  - White: 74.8%
  - Other: 2.6%

First languages (2011)
  - Afrikaans: 51.3%
  - English: 33.8%
  - Northern Sotho: 2.4%
  - Tswana: 1.9%
  - Other: 10.6%
- Time zone: UTC+2 (SAST)
- Postal code (street): 0181
- PO box: 0011

Brooklyn is a suburb of the city of Pretoria, South Africa. It is a well-established and wealthy area, lying to the east of the city centre, encompassing high-end residential properties and several upmarket mall developments. It borders the University of Pretoria to its north and the suburbs of Groenkloof and Waterkloof to its south. Brooklyn is also the location of Pretoria Boys High School. The Brooklyn Mall opened in 1989.

== History ==
The suburb was established on an old farm called Uitval in 1902 and takes its name from the surveyor James Brook.

== Demographics ==
According to the South African National Census of 2011, 4,177 people lived in Brooklyn.

74.8% were White, 18.8% Black African, 2.2% Indian or Asian and 1.6% Coloured.

51.3% spoke Afrikaans, 33.8% English, 2.4% Northern Sotho, 1.9% Tswana and 10.6% some other language as their first language.

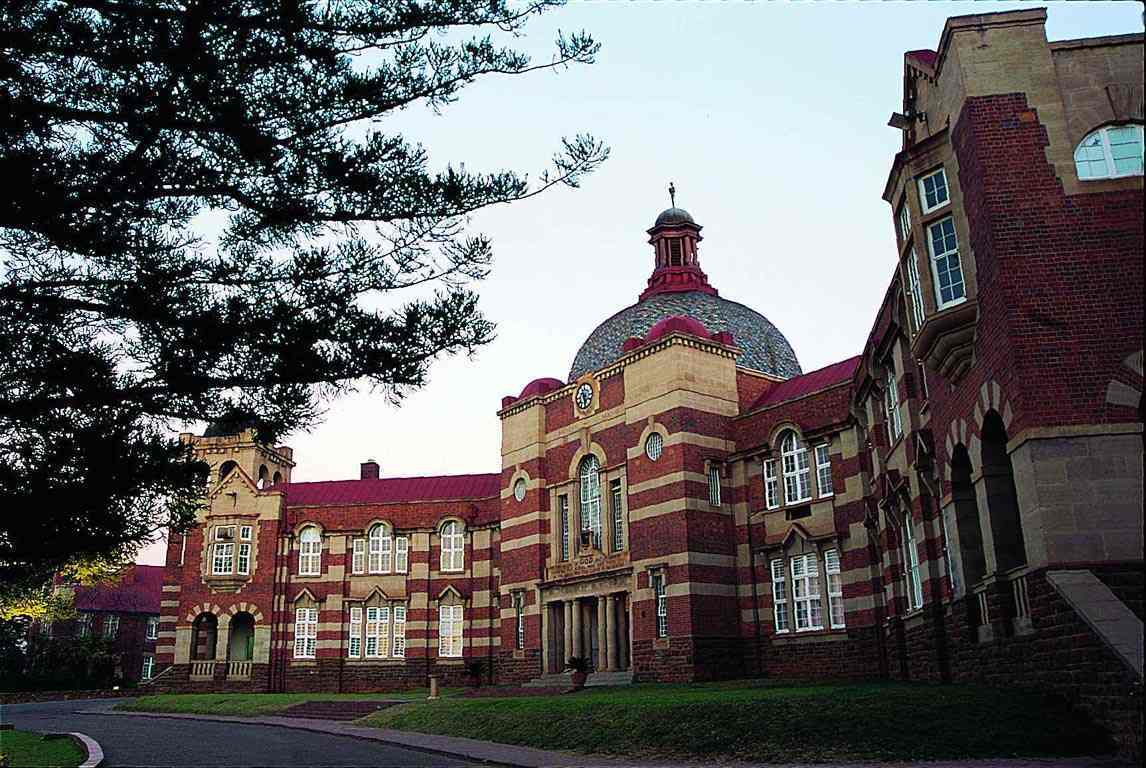
Main building of Pretoria Boys High School

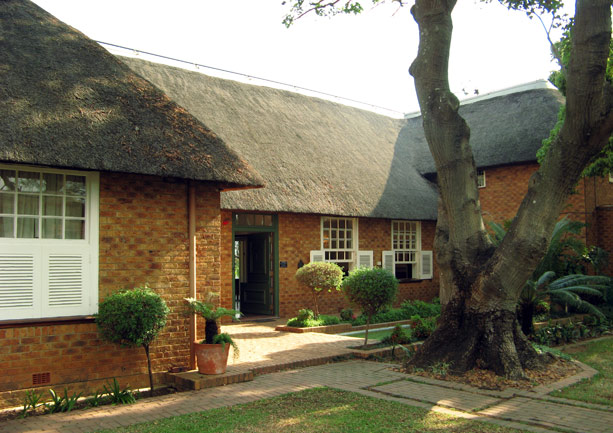
Anton van Wouw House, housing the Van Wouw Museum of the University of Pretoria

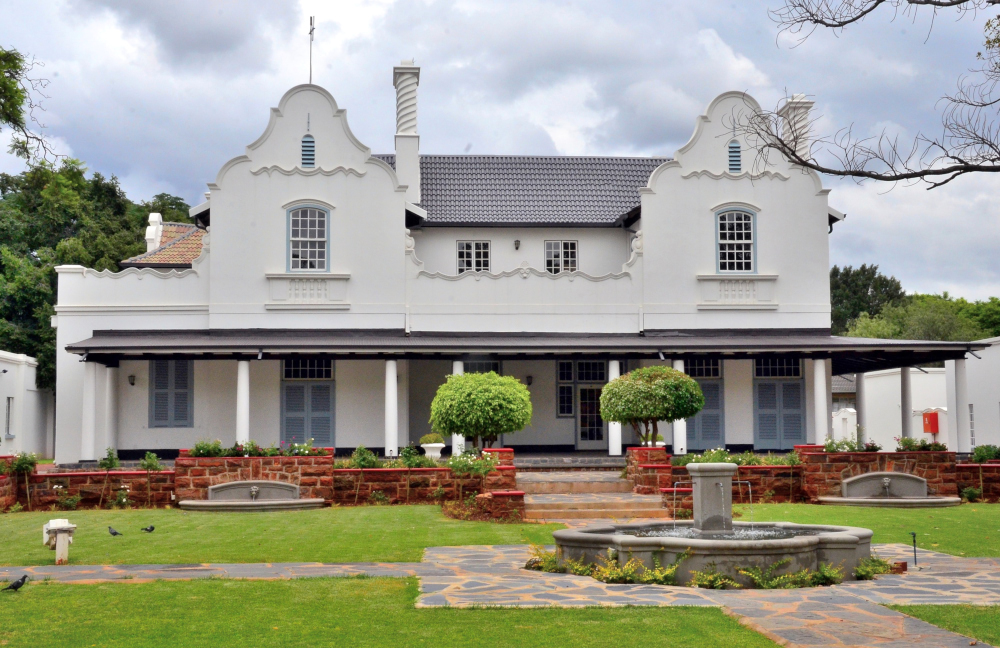
Brooks House was built shortly after James Brooks purchased the land that would form part of Brooklyn, Pretoria in 1886. James Brooks was partially responsible for the layout of the Brooklyn township.
