= Garsfontein =

- Location within Gauteng Location within South Africa Location within Africa
- Coordinates: 25.7913°S 28.2935°E
- Country: South Africa
- Province: Gauteng
- Municipality: City of Tshwane
- Main Place: Pretoria

Area
  - Total: 7.30 km^{2} (2.82 sq mi)

Population (2011)
  - Total: 19,501
  - Density: 2,670/km^{2} (6,920/sq mi)

Racial makeup (2011)
  - Black African: 17.6%
  - Coloured: 1.8%
  - Indian/Asian: 2.0%
  - White: 77.5%
  - Other: 1.1%

First languages (2011)
  - Afrikaans: 58.7%
  - English: 26.9%
  - Northern Sotho: 2.2%
  - Zulu: 1.9%
  - Other: 10.4%
- Time zone: UTC+2 (SAST)
- Postal code (street): Boxes: 0042; Streets: 0081
- PO box: 0042

Garsfontein is a residential suburb of the city of Pretoria in the Gauteng province of South Africa. It is a well-developed area, lying to the east of the city centre, close to the Menlyn Park shopping center.

== Education ==
Garsfontein is served by Laerskool Garsfontein a public elementary school and Hoërskool Garsfontein a public high school, both of which are primarily Afrikaans speaking schools.

== Points of interest ==
- Zita Park is public park which is frequented by families and children. It has well maintained facilities including a paddling pool, water slide, playground equipment, ablution facilities and a tuck shop. According to an article in Pretoria News on 10 August 2006 the park was established on the location of a cemetery for the black community formerly living there. The Eastwood Location was established as a black community on 1905, but under the proclamation of the Group Areas Act of 1950 the area was designated as a white area and resulted in the removal of the black residents.
