= List of metropolitan routes in South Africa =

Metropolitan routes in South Africa, also called metro roads or metro routes are designated with the letter M, and are usually major routes around cities in South Africa.

== East London ==
No.	Direction	Description of route	Suburbs	Street names
M1	North/South	R72 (City Centre) - M15 - M4 - M5/R102 - N2 - M11 (Dorchester Heights)	CBD, Arcadia, Southernwood, Selbourne, Vincent, Dorchester Heights	Oxford St., Union Ave., Western Ave., Two Rivers Dr.
M3	SSE/NNW	R72 (City Centre) - M15 - M5 - M16 - R102 (Mdantsane)	CBD, Pefferville, Duncan Village, Gompo Town, Buffalo Flats, Haven Hills, Reeston, Mdantsane	Buffalo St., North West Expressway, Phoenix St., Ziphunzana Bypass, Mdantsane Access Rd.
M4	East/West	M13 (Stirling) - M11 - R72 - M1 (cosigned for one block) - M5 - N2 - R102 (Summer Pride)	Stirling, Baysville, Southernwood, Braelynn, Amalinda, Amalinda Forest, Summerpride	Gleneagles Rd., Pearce St., Lukin Rd., Union Ave., Amalinda Dr., Main Road Amalinda
M5	NNE/SSW	Cosigned with R102 (M11 - M1 - R102) - M4 (cosigned for one block) - M3 - leaves town as the Buffalo Pass - R346		Deveraux Ave., Garcia St., Croydon Rd., French St., Windermere Rd., Main Road Amalinda, Woolwash Rd., Buffalo Pass
M7	NE/SW	M11 (Bonnie Doon) - M9 - M8 (Beacon Bay)	Bonnie Doon, Beacon Bay	Batting Rd.
M8	SE/NW	(Cosigned with R102N6 (Nonpumolelo) - M10/R102) - N2 - M7 - M9 - Bonza Bay Beach	Nonpumolelo, Beacon Bay	Bonza Bay Rd.
M9	First East/West then North/South	M7 - M8	Beacon Bay	Beaconhurst Dr.
M10	East/West	(Cosigned with R102 M8 - R102) - N2 - Gonubie Beach	Gonubie	Main Rd. (Gonubie)
M11	North/South	M4 - R102 (cosigned) - M12 - M7 - under N2 - R102 (end cosigned) - M1 (Dorchester Heights)	Stirling, Nahoon, Bonnie Doon, Abbotsford, Nahoon Valley Park, Dorchester Heights	Old Transkei Rd., Main Rd. (Abbotsford), Smythelands Rd.
M12	East West	M11 - M13 - Nahoon Beach	Nahoon	Beach Rd.
M13	North/South, U-bend, SSW/NNE	R72 (Quigney) - M4 - M12	Quigney, Baysville, Stirling, Nahoon	Currie St., Esplanade Rd., John Bailie Rd., Galway Rd.
M14	North/ South then East/West	R72 (CBD) - R72 (Arcadia)	CBD, Arcadia	Cambridge St., Stephenson/North Sts., Commercial Rd.
M15	East/West	M3 (CBD) - R72	CBD, Southernwood	St. Johns Rd., St. Peters St.
M16	North/South	R102 - M3	Mdantsane	Billie Rd.
M17			Mdantsane	
M18	East/West	R72 (CBD) - R72 (Cove Rock area)	CBD, West Bank, Cove Rock	Dr. Zahn Rd., Bank St., Strand St., Molteno Dr., Prince George Circuit, Parkridge Rd.
M19	North/South	R72 (Sunnyridge) - East London IDZ	Sunnyridge	Chester Rd.
M20	North/South	off R72?	West Bank area?	
M21	East/West	M3 - M3	Pefferville, Duncan Village, Gompo Town	Douglas Smit Highway
M25	North/South	R72 - Kidd's Beach	Kidd's Beach	Main St. (Kidd's Beach)

== Cape Town ==
No.	Direction	Description of route	Suburbs	Street names
M3	North / South	M62 (Central) – M96 – M59 – M60 (start highway) – N2 (merge) – N2 (demerge) – M89 (interchange) – M146 (interchange, end highway) – M63 – M33 – start highway – M155 (interchange) – M41 (interchange) – M38 (interchange) – M39 (interchange) – M40 (interchange) – M42 (end freeway (Kirstenhof)	Central, Gardens, District Six, Woodstock, Observatory, Mowbray, Rosebank, Groote Schuur Estate, Newlands, Claremont, Wynberg, Constantia, Barbarossa, Deurdrif, Belle Constantia, Sweet Valley, Dennendal, Tokai, Kirstenhof	Buitensingel, Orange St, Annandale Rd, Mill St., Jutland, De Waal Dr, Rhodes Dr, Union Ave, Paradise Rd, Edinburgh Dr, Simon van der Stel Freeway
M4	North / South	M59 (from District Six) – M60 – N2 (interchange) – M163 – N2 (interchange) – M18 – M89 – M92 – M63 – M33 – M24 – M9/M152 – M41 – M160 – M38 – M39 – M40 – M42 – M75 - R310 – M75 – M65 – M6 – M66 – M65 (Cape Point)	District Six, Woodstock, Salt River, Observatory, Mowbray, Rosebank, Rondebosch, Newlands, Claremont, Kenilworth, Wynberg, Plumstead, Diepriver, Bergvliet, Dreyersdal, Kirstenhof, Westlake, Lakeside, Muizenberg North, Muizenberg, St. James, Kalk Bay, Clovelly, Fish Hoek, Glencairn Heights, Glencairn, Bayview Heights, Mount Pleasant, Simon's Town, The Boulders, Winford, Beacons Way	Sir Lowry Rd, Victoria Rd, Main Rd, Simonstown Rd, Main Rd
M5	North / South	N7 (interchange, near Dunoon) – M14 (start cosign) – M14 (end cosign) - M87 - M8 – N1 (interchange, start highway) – M16 (interchange) – N2 (interchange) – M52 (interchange) - M18 (interchange) – M34 (interchange) – M24 (interchange) – M9 (no intersection) – M68 – (interchange, end highway) – M38 – M55 – M35 -R310 (Costa da Gama)	Dunoon, Killarney Gardens, Milnerton Ridge, Milnerton, Rugby, Brooklyn, Maitland, Observatory, Mowbray, Sybrand Park, Athlone, Rondebosch East, Lansdowne, Plumstead, Parkwood, Southfield, Retreat, Cafda Village, Lavender Hill, Coniston Park, Marina da Gama, Costa da Gama	Malibongwe Dr, Potsdam Rd, Koeberg Rd, Black River Parkway, Kromboom Parkway, Prince George Dr
M6	East / West then South / North	M62 (Central) – M61 – M62 – M63 – Start Toll Road – End Toll Road – M64 – M65 – M4 (Glencairn Heights)	Central, Green Point, Three Anchor Bay, Sea Point, Bantry Bay, Clifton, Camps Bay, Bakoven, Llandudno, Hout Bay, Berg-en-dal, Scott Estate, Noordhoek, Crofters Valley, Sun Valley, Sunnydale, Capri, Glencairn Heights	Helen Suzman Blvd, Beach Rd, Queens Rd, Victoria Rd, Main Rd, Chapman's Peak Dr, Noordhoek Rd, Ou Kaapseweg Ext, Glencairn Expressway
M7	North / South	N7/ N1 (interchange, Acacia Park) – M25 – R102 – M16 – N2 (interchange) – M18 – M24 - M9 (limited interchange) – M10 (interchange) -R300 – M181 – M46 – M10 – M177 - M32 – R310 (Rocklands)	Acacia Park, Tygerdal, Townsend Estate, Thornton, Epping Industrial, Bonteheuwel, Welcome, Vanguard, Surrey, Primrose Park, Sand Industria, Browns Farm, Philippi, Weltevreden Valley, Rondevlei Park, Westgate, Rocklands	Jakes Gerwel Dr, Weltevreden Rd
M8	East / West	M14 (Kleinbosch) – M12 – N7 (interchange) – M87 - M5 (Milnerton)	Kleinbosch, Edgemead, Summer Greens, Century Gate, Sanddrift North, Tijgerhof, Milnerton	Bosmandam Rd
M10	East / West	N2 / M165 (Firlands) – M149 – M153 – M168 – M156 – R102 – N2 (interchange) – R310 – M56 – M51 - M32 – M50 - M44 – M49 – R300 (no intersection) – M171 –M36 – M22 – M83 - M10 – M7 (no intersection) – M17 – M5 (no intersection) – M28 – M4 / M152 (Wynberg)	Firlands, Sir Lowry's Pass, Fernwood Estate, Rome Glen, Van Der Stel, Martinville, Somerset West Central, Briza Township, The Link, Griselda, Die Wingerd, Heldervue, Schoongelegen, Firgrove, Macassar, Umrhabulo Triangle, Mandela Park, Griffiths Mxenge, Eyethu, Nonqubela, Mxolisi Phetani, Ikwezi Park, Thembokwezi, Mandalay, Phillippi East, Philippi, Browns Farm, Schaap Kraal, Turf Hall, Wetton, Ottery, Wynberg	Sir Lowry's Pass Rd, Main Rd, Andries Pretorius St, Upper Orange St, Main Rd, Macassar Rd, Govan Mbeki Rd, Wetton Rd
M10	Northeast / Southwest	R102 (Bellville Central) – M11 – M189 / M171 – M29 – M12 – M22 – M47 – N2 (interchange) – M18 – M24 - M9 – M7 (interchange) – M7 (Westgate)	Bellville Central, Bellville South, Greenlands, Belhar, Bishop Lavis, Nooitgedacht, Valhalla Park, Bonteheuvel, Heideveld, Manenberg, Schaap Kraal, West Gate	Robert Sobukwe Rd, Duinefontein Rd, Weltevreden Rd
M11	East / West	M10 (Bellville Central) – M16 (Bellville Central)	Bellville Central	Tienie Meyer Rd
M12	North / South then West / East	M13 (Burgundy Estate) - M14 – M8 – M26 – N1 (partial interchange) – M25 (start cosign) – M25 (end cosign) – R102 – M16 – M151 – M10 – M71 – M171 – M180 – R300 –M182 – M174 - R102 – R310 (near Stellenbosch)	Burgundy Estate, Kleinbosch, Welgelegen, Kaapzicht, Parow North, Churchill, Glenlilly, Parow, Beaconvale, Cravenby, Connaught, Eureka, Belhar, Highbury Park, Stellendale, Saxenburg Industrial Park	Siena Dr, Giel Basson Dr, Jan van Riebeeck Dr, 35th Ave, Stellenbosch Rd, Polkadraai Rd
M13	East / West	M14 (Bothasig) – M12 – M31 – R302 (Durbanville Central)	Bothasig, Richwood, Nieuw Maastricht, Durbanville Central	Tygerberg Valley Rd, Racecourse Rd, Church St
M14	Northwest / Southeast	R27 / M19 (Melkbosstrand) - M120 - M187 - R27 – M5 (start cosign) – M5 (end cosign) – N7 (interchange) – M13 – M12 – M8 – M26 – N1 (interchange) – M25 – R102 (Parow)	Melkbosstrand, Big Bay, Bloubergstrand, Table View, Bothasig, Kleinbosch, Welgelegen, Plattekloof, Parow North, Clamhall, Churchill, Glenlily, Parow	Melkbosstrand Rd, Otto du Plessis Dr, Blaauwberg Rd, Koeberg Rd, Plattekloof Rd, McIntyre Rd
M15	Northwest / Southeast	R302 (Wellway Park) – M124 - M100 – M137 – M73 – N1 (interchange) – M25 – R101 – M23 (Botfontein SH)	Wellway Park, Langeberg Village, Sonstraal Heights, Zoo Park, Kraaifontein, Peerless Park East, Belmont Park, Wallacedene	Langeberg Rd, Brighton Rd, Van Riebeeck St, Botfontein St
M16	North / South then East / West	M31 (Kenridge) – N1 (interchange) – M25 – R102 – M11 – M29 – M12 – M76 – M47 – M7 – M17 – M52 – M5 (interchange, Maitland)	Kenridge, Door De Kraal, Welgemoed, Loevenstein, Vredelust, Klipkop, Ravensmead, Beaconvale, Avonwood, Elsiesrivier, Salberau, Epping Industrial, Pinelands, Ndabeni, Maitlands	Van Ribeeckshof Rd, Jip de Jager Dr, Mike Pienaar Blvd, Francie van Zijl Dr, Avonwood Ave, Viking Way, Jan Smuts Dr, Sunrise Cir, Berkley Rd
M17	North / South	M16 (Epping Industrial) – N2 (interchange) – M18 – M34 – M24 – M9 – M68 – M55 – M35 - R310 (Strandfontein)	Epping Industrial, Hazendal, Athlone, Crawford, Lansdowne, Turf Hall Estate, Ottery East, Montagu's Gift, Lotus River, Pelikan Park, Strandfontein	Jan Smuts Dr, Strandfontein Rd
M18	East / West	M4 (Mowbray) – M57 – M52 – M28 - M5 (interchange) – M17 – M7 – M10 – M47 – M22 / M83 (Nyanga)	Mowbray, Sybrand Park, Hazendal, Kewtown, Silvertown, Bridgetown, Vanguard, Heideveld, Guguletu, Nyanga	St Peters Rd, Durban Rd, Klipfontein Rd
M19	East / West	R27 / M14 (Melkbosstrand) – N7 (Cape Farms)	Melkbosstrand	Melkbosstrand Rd
M22	North / South	M10 (Valhalla Park) – Cape Town International Airport – N2 – M18 / M83 – M9 – R300 (no intersection) – M181 - M46 – M177 - M32 – R310 (Rocklands)	Valhalla Park, Airport Industria, Nyanga, Crossroads, Philippi, Heinz Park, New Woodlands, Woodlands, Westridge, Rocklands	Borcherds Quarry Rd, New Eisleben Rd, Eisleben Rd
M23	East / West	R304 (Stellenbosch Farms) – M15 – M100 – R300 (no intersection) – M31	Annandale, Soneike, Morgen Gronde	Bottelary Rd
M24	East / West	M10 (Mannenberg) - M7 (interchange) - M17 - M5 (interchange) – M28 – M57 - M4 (Claremont)	Claremont, Lansdowne, Pinati, Penlyn Estate, Primrose Park, Mannenberg	Turf Hall Rd, Race Course Rd, Doncaster Rd, Chichester Rd, Lansdowne Rd, Stanhope Rd
M25	East / West	M7 (Tygerdal) – M26 – M12 (start cosign) – M12 (end cosign) – M14 – M29 – M16 – M121 – R302 – M30 (start cosign) - M30 (end cosign) – M31 – R300 (no interchange) – M100 – M137 – M15 (Peerless Park)	Tygerdal, N1 City, Richmond Estate, Churchill, Clamhall, Fairfield, Avondale, Oostersee, Vredelust, Boston, Oakdale, Blomtuin, La Rochelle, Bellair, Hoogstede, Arauna, Morgenster Hoogte, Okavango Park, Scottsville, Peerless Park	Frans Conradie Dr, Giel Basson Dr, Frans Conradie Dr, Avondale St, Mabel St, Bill Bezuidenhout Dr, Suikerbos St, Frans Conradie Dr
M26	East / West then North / South	M14 (Plattekloof) – M12 – N1 (interchange) – M25 – R102 (Vasco Estate)	Plattekloof, Welgelegen, Monte Vista, N1 City, Vasco Estate	Rothschild Blvd, Kroonenburg Sq, Monte Vista Blvd, Vasco Blvd
M28	North / South	M5 (interchange) / M18 (Mowbray) – M92 – M34 – M33 – M24 – M9 – M68 (Wynberg)	Mowbray, Rondebosch, Claremont, Kenilworth, Wynberg	Milner Rd, Belvedere Rd, Rosmead Rd
M29	North / South	M25 (Avondale) – R102 – M16 – M10 – M71 (Belhar)	Avondale, Parow East, Klipkop, Ravensmead, Uitsig, Belhar	Tierberg Rd, De la Rey St, Akkerboom St
M30	North / South	M121 (Bellville Park) – R302 – N1 (no interchange) – M25 (start cosign) – M25 (end cosign) - R101 – R102 (Sanlamhof)	Bellville Park, Bloemhof, Blomtuin, Oakdale, Hillrise, Sanlamhof	Bill Bezuidenhout Ave
M31	North / South	M13 (Altydgedacht area) – M121 – R302 – M124 - N1 (interchange) – M25 – R101 – M23 – R102 (Shirley Park)	Kenridge, Ridgeworth, Stellenridge, La Rochelle, Bellair, Oak Glen, Kaymor, Shirley Park	Tygerbergvallei Rd, Old Oak Rd, Labelle St.
M32	North / South then East / West	M174 / M173 (Hillcrest Heights) – N2 (interchange) – M9 – M45 – M44 – M49 – M36 – M22 – M7 – M17 (Strandfontein)	Hillcrest Heights, Faure, Eyethu, Khaya, East Ridge, Portlands, Rocklands, Strandfontein	Spine Rd
M33	East / West	M28 (Claremont) – M57 – M4 – M152 – M3 (Claremont)	Claremont	Keurboom Rd, Camp Ground Rd, Protea Rd, Paradise Rd
M34	East / West	M17 (Athlone) – M5 (interchange) – M28 (Rondebosch)	Athlone, Rondebosch East, Rondebosch	Kromboom Rd
M35	East / West	M17 (Lotus River) – M5 (Grassy Park)	Lotus River, Grassy Park	5th Ave
M36	North / South	M9 (Philippi East) – R300 (interchange) – M181 - M46 – M177 – M32 (Eastridge)	Philippi East, Lentegeur, Beacon Valley, Eastridge	Stock Rd, AZ Berman Rd
M38	East / West	M5 (Southfield) – M4 – M3 (interchange) – M42 (Belle Constantia)	Southfield, Dieprivier, Meadowridge, Belle Constantia	De Waal Rd, Kendal Rd
M39	Northwest / Southeast	M41 (Constantia Vale) – M42 – M3 (interchange) – M4 (Retreat)	Constantia Vale, Gaylands, Meadowridge, Bergvliet, Retreat	Ladies Mile Rd
M40	East / West	M4 (Kirstenhof) – M3 (interchange) – M42 (Tokai)	Kirstenhof, Tokai	Tokai Rd
M41	East / West	M4 (Wynberg) – M160 – M155 – M3 (interchange) – M42 – M39 – M63 (near Hout Bay)	Wynberg, Alphen, Constantia Vale, Silverhurst, Witteboomen	Constantia Main Rd
M42	North / South then East / West	M41 (Alphen) – M38 – M39 – M40 – M64 – M3 (interchange) – M4 (Kirstenhof)	Alpen, Belle Constantia, Airlie, Fir Grove, Forest Glade, Tokai, Westlake Estate, Kirstenhof	Spaanschemat River Rd, Orpen Rd, Steenberg Rd
M44	North / South then East / West	M49 (near Driftsands) – N2 (interchange) – M9 – M50 – M32 – M51 – M56 – R310 (Enkanini)	Mxolisi Phetani, Bongani, Victoria Mxenge, Kaya, Ilitha Park, Harare, Kuyasa, Enkanini	Mew Way
M45	North / South then East / West	M9 (Nonqubela) – M50 - M32 – M51 – M56 – R310 (Enkanini)	Nonqubela, Eyethu, Graceland, Mandela Park, Umrhabulo Triangle, Enkanini	Bonga Dr, Lwandle Rd, Walter Sisulu Rd
M46	East / West	M49 (Beacon Valley) – M36 – M22 – M7 (Westgate)	Beacon Valley, Lentegeur, Woodlands, Westgate	Morgenster Rd
M47	North / South	M16 (Epping Industrial) – M151 - M10 – M18 (Guguletu)	Epping Industrial, Kalksteenfontein, Valhalla Park, Charlesville, Guguletu	Valhalla Dr, Steve Biko Dr
M48	East / West	N7 (near Cape Farms) – M58 (Skilpadvlei)	Durbanvale, Skilpadvlei	Vissershok Rd
M49	East / West then North / South	R310 (Eersterivier Suid) – M32 – M44 – N2 (no interchange) – M9 – M181 – M46 – M32 – M51 - R310 (near Monwabisi)	Eersterivier Suid, Electric City, Faure, Mfuleni, Mxolisi Phetani, Thembokwezi, Lentegeur, Beacon Valley, Eastridge, Lost City	Old Faure Rd, Swartklip Rd,
M50	East / West	M9 (Nonqubela) – M45 – M44 (Victoria Mxenge)	Nonqubela, Victoria Mxenge	Pama Rd
M51	East / West	M9 (Griffiths Mxenge) – M45 – M44 – M49 (Lost City)	Griffiths Mxenge, Ilitha Park, Lost City	Steve Biko Rd
M52	East / West	M18 (Mowbray) – M5 (interchange) – N2 (interchange) – M16 (Pinelands)	Mowbray, Pinelands	Raapenberg Rd, Forest Dr
M54	East / West	M171 (Delft) – M180 – R300 (interchange) – M174 (Sunset Glen)	Delft, Voorbrug, Diepwater, Fairdale, Fountain Village, Sunset Glen	Hindle Rd
M55	East / West	M5 (Grassy Park) – M17 (Montagu's Gift)	Grassy Park, Montagu's Gift	Klip Rd
M56	North / South	M9 (Mandela Park) – M45 – M44 – R310 (Monwabisi)	Mandela Park, Kuyasa, Monwabisi	Oscar Mpetha Rd
M57	North / South	R102 (Salt River) – M163 – N2 (interchange) – M18 – M92 – M33 – M24 (Claremont)	Salt River, Observatory, Mowbray, Rosebank, Rondebosch, Claremont	Albert Rd, Malta Rd, Liesbeeck Parkway, Palmyra Rd
M58	North / South	R304 (Cape Farms) – M48 - R302 (Durbanville Central)	Durbanville Central, Skilpadvlei, Nerina, Durbanvale	Adderley Rd, Koeberg Rd
M59	North / South	R102 (Foreshore) – M4 – M3 (Gardens)	Foreshore, District Six, Gardens	Buitenkant St
M60	North / South	N2 (Foreshore) – R102 – M4- M3 (District Six)	Foreshore, District Six	Christiaan Barnard St, Tennant St, De Villiers St, Roeland St
M61	East / West	M62 (Central) – M6 (Sea Point)	Central, Green Point, Three Anchor Bay, Sea Point	Somerset Rd, Main Rd, Regent St
M62	Northeast / Southwest	N2 (Central) – M6 – M61 – M3 – M6 (Camps Bay)	Central, Gardens, Camps Bay	Buitengracht St, Kloof Nek St, Camps Bay Dr
M63	Northeast / Southwest	M4 (Rondebosch) – M146 – M3 – M41 – M6 (Berg-en-Dal)	Rondebosch, Newlands, Bishopscourt, Klassenbosch, Bel Ombre, Witteboomen, Hout Bay, Imizamo Yethu, Berg-en-Dal	Klipper Rd, Newlands Ave, Rhodes Dr, Hout Bay Rd
M64	Northeast / Southwest	M42 (Westlake Estate) – M6 (Sunnydale)	Westlake Estate, Stonehurst, Silvermine Village, Crofters Valley, Sunnydale	Ou Kaapse Weg
M65	East / West then Northeast / South West	M4 (Fish Hoek) – M6 – M82 – M82 – M66 – M4 (near Cape Point)	Fish Hoek, Risi View, Sun Valley, Sunnydale, Fairie Knowe, Masiphumelele, Heron Park, Imhoff's Gift, Ocean View, Kommetjie, Scarborough	Kommetjie Rd, Main Rd, Plateau Rd
M66	Northeast / Southwest	M4 (Bayview Heights) – M65 (near Scarborough)	Bayview Heights, Redhill	Red Hill Rd
M68	East / West	M28 (Wynberg) – M5 (interchange) – M17 (Ottery East)	Wynberg, Royal Cape, Ottery, Ottery East	Ottery Rd, New Ottery Rd
M71	East / West (Semi Circle)	M12 / M180 (Belhar) – M171 – M29 – M12 (Belhar)	Belhar	Belhar Dr, Erica Dr
M73	East / West	R302 (Durbell) – M124 - M100 – M137 – M15 (Kraaifontein)	Durbell, Everglen, Eversdal, Bethanie, Amanda Glen, Vredekloof, Vredekloof East, Kraaifontein	Eversdal Rd, De Bron Rd, Marlborough St, Darwin Rd
M75	North / South	M4 (Lakeside) – M4 (Kalk Bay)	Lakeside, Muizenberg North, Muizenberg, St James, Kalk Bay	Boyes Dr
M76	Northeast / Southwest	M16 (Elsiesrivier) – M151 (Connaught)	Elsiesrivier, Balvenie	Halt Rd
M82	North / South	M65 (Ocean View) – M65 (near Ocean View)	Ocean View	Slangkop Rd
M83	North / South	M18 / M22 (Nyanga) – M9 (Nyanga)	Nyanga	Ntlangano Cr, Great Dutch Rd, Sithandatu Ave, Emms Dr
M87	North / South	M5 (Marconi Beam) - M8 - N1?	Marconi Beam, Joe Slovo Park, Sanddrift, Century City?	Omuramba Rd, Ratanga Rd?, Sable Rd?
M89	East / West	M3 (from Rosebank) – M4 (Rosebank)	Rosebank	Woolsack Rd.
M92	East / West	M4 (Rondebosch) – M57 – M28 (Rondebosch)	Rondebosch	Belmont Rd, Park Rd
M96	North / South	M3 (Gardens) – Oranjezicht	Gardens, Oranjezicht	Upper Orange St
M100	North / South	R302 (The Crest) – M15 – M73 – N1 (interchange) – M25 – R101 – M23 (Annandale)	The Crest, Uitzicht, Pinehurst, Sonstraal Heights, Vredekloof, Bracken Heights, Hoogstede, Ferndale, Brackenfell Industrial, Sonkring, Burgundy, Annandale	Brackenfell Blvd
M120	East / West	R27 (near Sunningdale) – M14 (Big Bay)	Big Bay	Big Bay Blvd
M121	North / South	M31 (Kenridge) – M30 – N1 (no interchange) – M25(Oakdale)	Kenridge, Oakdale	Carl Cronje Dr
M124	North / South	M15 (Langeberg Village) – M73 – M31 (Stellenridge)	Langeberg Village, Sonstraal, Amanda Glen, Stellenryk, Silverstream, East Rock, Glen Ive, Stellenridge	Fairtrees Rd, Eversdal Way
M137	North / South	M15 (near Zoo Park) – M73 – N1 (interchange) – M25 – R101 (Brackenfell Industrial)	Langeberg Ridge, Morgenster Hoogte, Morgenster, Brackenfell Industrial	Okavango Rd
M146	East / West	M3 (Rondebosch, interchange) – M63 (Rondebosch)	Rondebosch	Princess Anne Ave
M149	Northeast / Southwest	M9 (Somerset West Central) – N2 – R44 (near Langgewacht)	Somerset West Central, Garden Village, Helderzicht, Victoria Park	Victoria St
M151	East / West	M12 (Connaught) – M76 – M47 (Epping Industrial)	Connaught, Balvenie, Clarkes, Matroosfontein, Epping Industrial	Owen Rd
M152	North / South	M33 (Claremont) – M4 / M9 (Kenilworth)	Claremont, Kenilworth	Newlands Rd, Tennant St, Riverstone Rd
M153	Northeast / Southwest	M9 (Van Der Stel) – N2 (interchange) – R44 (Rome)	Van Der Stel, Somerset Park, Longlands, Rome	Main Rd
M155	North / South	M3 (Wynberg, interchange) – M41 (Wynberg)	Wynberg	Trovato Link, Waterloo Rd, Bower Rd
M156	West / East then North / South	M9 (Firgrove) – R44 – M168 (Parel Vallei)	Firgrove, Eldawn, Helena Heights, Briza Township, Parel Vallei	Winery Rd, Steynsrust Rd, Harewood Ave, Irene Ave
M160	Northwest / Southeast	M41 (Plumstead) – M4 (Plumstead)	Plumstead	Gabriel Rd.
M161	Northeast / Southwest	N2 (Broadlands Industrial) – R44 (Gustrow)	Broadlands Industrial, Tarentaalplaas, Casablanca, Gustrow	Broadlands Rd
M163	East / West	M4 (Observatory) – M57 (Observatory)	Observatory	Station Rd.
M165	Northeast / Southwest	N2 / M9 (Firlands) – R44 (Gordon's Bay Central)	Mansfield Park, Temperance Town, Mountainside, Gordon's Bay Central	Sir Lowry's Pass Rd
M167	North / South	N1 (Kraaifontein Industry) – R101 (Belmont Park)	Kraaifontein Industry, Belmont Park	Maroela Rd
M168	East / West	Lourensford Estate – M156 – M9 (Somerset West Central)	Erinvale, Land-en-Zeezicht, Parel Vallei, Somerset West Central	Lourensford Rd
M171	North / South	M10 / M189 (Greenlands) – M71 – M12 – M54 – M180 – N2 (no interchange) – M9 (Philippi East)	Greenlands, Belhar, Delft, Delft South, Philippi East	Symphony Way
M173	East / West	M32 / M174 (Hillcrest Heights) – R102 (Rosedale)	Hillcrest Heights, Forest Heights, Forest Glade, Rosedale	Forest Dr
M174	North / South	M12 (Blackheath Industria) – M54 – M32 / M173 (Hillcrest Heights)	Blackheath Industrial, Sunset Glen, Malibu Village, Hillcrest Heights	Range Rd, Wimbledon Rd, Buttskop Rd, Eersriv Way
M175	East / West	Zevenwacht Estate – R102 (Klipdam)	Zevendal, Jacarandas, Mikro Park, Klipdam	Langverwacht Rd
M176	North / South	N2 (Woodstock, interchange) – R102 (Woodstock)	Woodstock	Lower Church St.
M177	East / West	M36 (Beacon Valley) – M22 – M7 (Westgate)	Beacon Valley, Portlands, Westridge, Westgate	Wespoort Dr
M180	North / South	M12 / M171 (Belhar) – M54 – M171 (Delft South)	Belhar, Roosendaal, Voorbrug, Eindhoven, Delft South	Delft Main Rd
M181	East / West	M49 (Lentegeur) – M36 – M22 – M7 (Rondevlei Park)	Lentegeur, New Woodlands, Colorado, Rondevlei Park	Highlands Dr
M182	North / South	R102 (Kuilsrivier) – M12 (Highbury Park)	Kuilsrivier, Oakdene, Highbury, Highbury Park	Nooiensfontein Dr
M187	Northwest / Southeast	M14 (Table View) - R27 (Dolphin Beac)	Table View, Dolphin Beach	Marine Dr
M189	North / South then East / West	R102 (Labiance) – M10 / M180 (Greenlands)	Labiance, Bellville South Industrial, Sacks Circle Industrial, Greenlands	Peter Barlow Rd, Modderdam Rd

== Johannesburg ==
No.	Direction	Description of route	Suburbs	Cities	Street names	Notes
M1	North/South	N12/R82 (Ridgeway) - M5/R553 - M17 - M27 - M2 (cosigned east/west) - M10 - M18 - M17 - M27 - M9 - M31 - M16 - R25 - M20 - M30 - M40 - M60 - R55 - N1/N3 (Buccleuch)	Ridgeway/Ormonde, Crown Gardens/Evans Park, Robertsham, Booysens, Crown Mines, Newtown, Braamfontein, Parktown, Killarney, Houghton Estate, Waverley, Bramley, Wynberg, Wendywood, Kelvin, Buccleuch	Johannesburg, Sandton	De Villiers Graaff Motorway	Highway
M2	East/West	R41 (Crown Mines) - M1 (cosigned) - M9 - M31 - M19 - M33 - N3/N12 - M93 - M53 - M37 (Germiston)	Crown Mines, Selby, Kaserne, Benrose, Denver, Driehoek, Germiston CBD	Johannesburg, Germiston	Francois Oberholzer Freeway, Jack St	Highway
M5	North/South	M38 (Ridgeway) - R553/M1 - M79 - M70 - R41 - R24 (cosigned east/west) - M10 (cosigned 1 block east/west) - M18 - M16 - M30 - M8 - N1 - M86 - M6 - R564 - M67 - R114 (cosigned east/west) - N14 (Muldersdrift)	Ridgeway, Ormonde/Aeroton, Nasrec, Riverlea, Paarlshoop, Crosby/Mayfair West, Brixton, Rossmore, Auckland Park, Melville, Montgomery Park, Franklin Roosevelt Park, Northcliff/Risidale, Blackheath, Kelland, Randpark Ridge, Sundowner, Laser Park, Zandspruit, Rural areas	Johannesburg, Randburg	Nasrec Rd, Marais St, Schoeman St, Du Toit St, Deville St (R24), Jerome Ave, Mercury St, High St (M10), Ripley Rd, Ditton Ave, University Rd, Main Rd, Beyers Naude Dr	
M6	East/West	R564 (Glen Dayson) - M69 - M5 - R512 - M71 (Ferndale)	Glen Dayson, Randpark Ridge, Boskruin, Bromhof, Malanshof, Ferndale	Roodepoort, Randburg	John Vorster Dr, Ysterhout Dr, Hans Schoeman St, Hill St, Main Ave, Bond St	
M7	North/South	Hill Rd (unsigned), M53, M61(cosigned), M80, R59, R554, M68, M19 (cosigned), M68, N12, M38, M34, M27, M70, R41, R24, M10 (cosigned east/west), M18 (cosigned), M17 (Richmond)	Zonkizizwe, Tsietsie, Siluma View, Palm Ridge, Edenpark, Phola Park, Tokoza, Alrode South, Albertsdal, Brackendowns, Liefde en Vrede, Aspen Lakes, Mulbarton, Suideroord, Gillview, Bellavista South, Bellavista Estate, West Turffontein, Booysens, Orphirton, Selby, Mayfair, Fordsburg, Braamfontein, Cottesloe, Richmond	Katlehong, Alberton, Johannesburg	M7, Provincial Rd, Rivett-Carnett St, Vereeniging Rd (M61), Kliprivier Dr, Heronmere Rd, Long St, Earp St, Cross St, Treu Rd, Park Dr, 6th Ave, Mint Rd, De La Rey St, 17th St (M10), Solomon St, Annett Rd, Barry Hertzog Ave	
M8	East/West	M18 (Floracliffe) - M47 - N1 - M5 - M13 / M20 - R512 - M71	Floracliffe, Fairland, Northcliffe, Blackheath, Cresta, Darrenwood, Linden	Roodepoort, Randburg	William Nicol Dr, 14th Ave, Weltevreden Rd, Pendoring Rd, Judges Ave, South Rd/End Rd, 1st Ave	
M9	North/South	M34 (Turffontein) - M2 - R29 - R24 - M27 - M10 - M18 - M71 - M1 - M16 - R25 - M20 - M30 (cosigned) - M75 - M64 - M40 - M74 (cosigned) - N1 - R564 (Paulshof)	Turffontein, Stafford, Village Deep, Marshalltown, Johannesburg CBD, Braamfontein, Parktown, Houghton Estate, Melrose, Illovo, Inanda, Sandhurst, Sandton CBD, Morningside, Edenburg, Paulshof	Johannesburg, Sandton	Turffontein Rd, Eloff St, Rissik St, Loveday St/Joubert St, Victoria Ave, Oxford Rd, Rivonia Rd	
M10	East/West	R558 – R554 – N12 - M68 – M76 – M79 – M70 (cosigned), R41, R24, M18, M5 (cosigned), M17 (cosigned), M7 (cosigned), M1, M27, M9, M11, M31, M18 (Observatory)	Thembalihle, Lenasia, Klipspruit West, Klipriviersoog Estate, Pimville, Klipspruit, Orlando West, Orlando East, Noordgesig, Riverlea, Industria, Newclare, Westbury, Hurst Hill, Brixton, Mayfair, Braamfontein, Johannesburg CBD, Doornfontein, Bertrams, Bezuidenhout Valley, Observatory	Lenasia, Soweto, Johannesburg	Klipspruit Valley Rd, Main Rd, East Rd, Boundary Rd, Klipspruit Valley Rd, Soweto Highway (M70), Main Rd, Canada Rd, Commando Rd, Fuel Rd, Harmony St, Portland St, High St, Bartlett Rd, 17th St, Smit St, Smit St/Wolmarans St, Saratoga Ave, Charlton Ter, Berea Rd/Gordon Rd, North Ave/Bezuidenhout Ave, Homestead Ave	
M11	North/South	M95 (Bassonia) – N12 – M38 – M34 – N17 – M2 – R29 – R24 – M10 – M18 – M71 – M31 – M16 (cosigned) – R25 (cosigned) – M20 – M30 – M40 – M60 – R55/R101 (Kelvin)	Bassonia, Oakdene, Rosettenville, La Rochelle, Marshalltown, Johannesburg CBD, Joubert Park, Hillbrow, Houghton Estate, Orange Grove, Orchards, Highlands North, Savoy Estate, Bramley, Kew, Wynberg, Marlboro Gardens, Kelvin	Alberton, Johannesburg, Sandton	Comaro St, Oak Ave, Prairie St, Diagonal St, Wemmer Pan Rd, Mooi St, Anderson St /Marshall St (R29), Von Wielligh St, Klein St, King George St, Clarendon Pl, Louis Botha Ave, Pretoria Main Rd	
M13	North/South; East/West	M8 / M20 (Windsor East) – R512 – M71 – M27 – M81 (Hurlingham)	Windsor East, Windsor Glen, Randpark, Fontainebleau, Moret, Ferndale, Blairgowrie, Bordeaux, Hurlingham	Randburg, Johannesburg	Republic Rd	
M14	East/West	R29 (Jeppestown) – M33 – M52 – M53 – M37 (Primrose)	Jeppestown, Malvern East, Primrose Hill, Primrose	Johannesburg, Germiston	Jules St, Geldenhuis Rd, Cyclonia Rd, Gorst Ave, Churchill Ave	
M16	East/West	M5 (Emmerentia) – M71 (cosigned) – M27 (cosigned) – M9 – M31 (cosigned) – M11 (cosigned) – M33 – M40 – M97 – M37 – M78 – M59 – M39 – M57 (Isando)	Emmarentia, Parkview, Westcliff, Forest Town, Saxonwold, Houghton Estate, Orange Grove, Linksfield, Dowerglen, Dunvegan, Edenvale CBD, Edenglen, Isandovale, Croyden, Isando	Johannesburg, Edenvale, Kempton Park	Judith Rd, Barry Hertzog Ave (M71), Greenhill Rd, Wicklow Ave, Westcliff Dr, Jan Smuts Ave (M27), Upper Park Dr, Erlswold Way, Eastwold Way, Riviera Rd, West St (M31), 1st Ave, Louis Botha Ave (M11), 8th St, Club St, Linksfield Ave, 2nd St, Homestead Rd, Baker Rd, Harris Ave, Brabazon Rd, Andre Greyvenstein Rd	
M17	North/South	N12 (Winchester Hills) – M38 – M1 – M34 – M70 – R41 – R24 – M10 (cosigned) – M7/M71 (Parktown)	Winchester Hills, Robertsham, Ormonde, Theta, Mayfair, Brixton, Aukland Park, Parktown	Johannesburg	Xavier St, Crownwood Rd, Church St, Queens Rd, Smit St (M10), Brixton Rd, Symons Rd, Henley Rd, Kingsway Ave (M18), Empire Rd	
M18	East/West	R28 (Noordheuwel) – M36 – R558 – M67 (cosigned) – R564 – M69 – M8 – M47 – M30 – M10 – M5 – M17 – M7 (cosigned) – M27 – M9 (cosigned) – M11 – M31 (cosigned) – M10 – M33 – R24 (Bruma)	Noordheuwel, Factoria, Mindalore, Witpoortjie, Princess, Helderkruin, Horison Park, Horison, Ontdekkers Park, Constantia Kloof, Florida Park, Florida Hills, Florida North, Florida CBD, Maraisburg, Delarey, Newlands, Westbury, Westdene, Auckland Park, Cottesloe, Braamfontein, Hillbrow, Berea, Houghton Estate, Yeoville, Bellevue, Observatory, Dewetshof, Cyrildene, Bruma	Krugersdorp, Roodepoort, Johannesburg	Voortrekker Rd, Ontdekkers Rd, Main Rd, Perth Rd, Kingsway Ave, Annet Rd (M7), Solomon St (M7), Enoch Sontonga Ave, Jorissen Ave / De Korte St, Loveday St / Joubert St (M9), Kotze St, Kotze St / Pretoria St, Abel Rd, Joe Slovo Dr (M31), Raleigh St, Hunter St / Rockey St, Observatory Ave, Marcia St	
M19	North/South	M38 (The Hill) – M34 (cosigned) – N17 – M31 – M2 – R29 (Benrose)	The Hill, Regents Park, City Deep, Benrose	Johannesburg	Southern Klipriviersberg Rd, 3rd Ave, Drakensberg Rd, East Rd, Southern Klipriviersberg Rd, Vickers Rd, Ruven Rd	
M20	East/West	M7/M13 (Windsor East) – R512 – M30 – M71 – M27 – M9 – M1 – M31 (cosigned) – M11 – M40 – R25 (Lyndhurst)	Windsor East, Darrenwood, Linden, Victory Park, Emmarentia, Greenside, Parkwood, Melrose Estate, Oaklands, Highlands North, Kew, Lyndhurst	Randburg, Johannesburg	Republic Rd, 3rd Ave, Linden Rd, Gleneagles Rd, Chester Rd, Bolton Rd, Glenhove Rd, Pretoria Ave, Athol St, Pretoria Rd	
M22	East/West	M7/M13 (Windsor East) – R512 – M30 – M71 – M27 – M9 – M1 – M31 (cosigned) – M11 – M40 – R25 (Lyndhurst)	Windsor East, Darrenwood, Linden, Victory Park, Emmarentia, Greenside, Parkwood, Melrose Estate, Oaklands, Highlands North, Kew, Lyndhurst	Randburg, Johannesburg	Republic Rd, 3rd Ave, Linden Rd, Gleneagles Rd, Chester Rd, Bolton Rd, Glenhove Rd, Pretoria Ave, Athol St, Pretoria Rd	
M27	North/South	M1 (Booysens) – M7 (cosigned) – R41 – R24 – M10 – M18 – M71 – M1 – M16 (cosigned) – R25 – M20 – M30 (cosigned) – M81 – M71 (Blairgowrie)	Booysens, Selby, Marshalltown, Johannesburg CBD, Braamfontein, Parktown, Westcliff, Parkview, Saxonwold, Parkwood, Parktown North, Dunkeld West, Hyde Park, Craighall, Craighall Park, Blairgowrie	Johannesburg, Sandton, Randburg	Booysens Rd, Simmonds Avenue, Queen Elizabeth Bridge, Jan Smuts Ave	
M30	East/West	M18 (Delarey) – M5 – M20 – M71 – M27 (cosigned) – M9 (cosigned) – M1 – M31 – M11 – R25 (Rembrandt Park)	Delarey, Newlands, Albertskroon, East Town, Franklin Roosevelt Park, Emmarentia, Greenside, Parkhurst, Parktown North, Rosebank, Dunkeld, Illovo, Fairway, Birnham, Bramley, Kew, Lombardy West, Corlett Gardens, Rembrandt Park	Roodepoort, Johannesburg	Mollie Rd, Long Rd, 5th St, Milner Rd, Preller Dr, Hofmeyr Dr, Tana Rd, Victory Rd, 6th St, 7th Ave, Jan Smuts Ave (M27), Jellicoe Ave, Oxford Rd (M9), Corlett Dr, 9th Rd, Canning Rd, Main Rd, Wordsworth Rd	
M31	North/South	R554 (Raceview) – M48 – N12 – M38 / M46 – M34 – N17 - M33 – M19 – M2 – R29 – R24 – M10 – M18 (cosigned) – M11 – M1 – M16 (cosigned) – R25 – M20 (cosigned) – M30 (Bramley)	Raceview, New Redruth, Florentia, Southcrest, Tulisa Park, Elandspark, City Deep, Johannesburg CBD, New Doornfontein, Berea, Houghton Estate, Oaklands, Waverley, Bramley	Alberton, Johannesburg	Heidelberg Rd, Ring Rd East, Voortrekker Rd, Heidelberg Rd, Joe Slovo Dr, St Andrew Rd, Houghton Dr, West St, Central St, Pretoria Ave (M20), Athol Oaklands Rd, Scott St	
M32	East/West	M39 (Cresslawn) – M92 – M84 – M57 (cosigned) – M45 – M96 - R21 – R23 – M44 (Benoni AH)	Cresslawn, Spartan, Rhodesfield, Kempton Park CBD, Pomona AH, Bredell AH, Benoni AH	Kempton Park, Benoni	Plane Rd, Pretoria Rd (M57), Pomona Rd, 3rd Rd, 3rd Ave, Elm Rd, Birch Rd	
M33	North/South	M31 (City Deep) – R29 – M14 – M22 – M97 – R24 – M18 – M16 – R25 (Sydenham)	City Deep, Rosherville, Heriotdale, Cleveland, Malvern, Kensington, Bruma, Cyrildene, Observatory, Linksfield, Fairwood, Orange Grove, Sydenham	Johannesburg	Houer St, Lower Germiston Rd, Cleveland Rd, 31st St, Monmouth Rd, Pandora Rd, Queen St, Friedland Ave, Cooper St, Frederick St, Louise St, Grace Rd, Sylvia Pass St, Goodman Terr, 7th St, 9th Ave,	
M34	East/West	M17 (Ormonde) – M7 – M9 – M11 – M19 (cosigned) - M31 (Elandspark)	Ormonde, Robertsham, Southdale, West Turffontein, Turffontein, Kenilworth, La Rochelle, Rosettenville, The Hill, Rewlatch, South Hills, Elandspark	Johannesburg	Northern Pkway, Alamein Rd, Webb Rd, Turf Club Rd, Geranium St, Drakensberg Rd, Glensands Ave East, East Rd, Southern Klipriviersberg Rd	
M35	North/South	R103 (Boksburg AH) – M43 – R554 – M94 – M46 (Martin du Preezville)	Boksburg AH, Rondebult, Groeneweide, Klippoortje, Elspark, Reiger Park, Martin du Preezville	Boksburg, Germiston	Heidelberg Rd, Boksburg Rd	
M36	East/West	R24 (Oatlands) – R563 – R28 – R24 (cosigned) – R558 / M18 (Factoria)	Oatlands, Krugersdorp West, Burgershoop, Krugersdorp CBD, Wentworth Park, Factoria	Krugersdorp	Rustenburg Rd, Commissioner St, Coronation St, Main Reef Rd (R24), Barratt Rd	
M37	North/South	Tsongweni – R554 – M49 – M94 (cosigned) - N17 – M48 – M93 - M46 – M49 – M2 – M53 (cosigned) – R29 (cosigned) – M57 – M14 – M98 - M52 – N12 – R24 – M59 – R25 - N3 (Lakeside)	Tsongweni, Wadeville, Dinwiddie, Lambton, Denlee, Delville, South Germiston, Germiston CBD, Delport, Primrose, Dawnview, Solheim, Rietfontein, Meadowbrook, Hurleyvale, Edenvale CBD, Lakeside	Katlehong, Germiston, Edenvale	Black Reef Rd, Wits Rifles Rd, Russell Rd, Lake Rd, Joubert St, President St, Exodus Rd (M53), Johann Rissik Rd, Shamrock Rd, AG de Witt Dr, Edenvale Rd, van Riebeeck Rd, St John Rd, 17th Ave, Andries Pretorius Rd, van Riebeeck Ave	
M38	East/West	R553 (Naturena) – M68 – M5 – M17 – M7 – M11 – M19 – R59 – M31 / M46 (Tulisa Park)	Naturena, Comptonville, Meredale, Southgate, Ridgeway, Crown Gardens, Robertsham, Gillview, Towerby, Rosettenville, The Hill, South Hills, Tulisa Park	Johannesburg	Main Rd, Rifle Range Rd, Verona St, South Rand Rd	Sometimes signed as route in Midrand
M39	North/South	M94 (Wadeville) – M53 (cosigned) – M46 (cosigned) – R29 (cosigned) – M57 – M52 - M44 – M59 – M99 - M16 – M92 – M32 – M88 - M90 – R25 – M18 (Pretoria) – R101 – N1 – R55 (Kyalami Gardens)	Wadeville, Klippoortje, Elsburg, Tedstoneville, Germiston South, Knights, Primrose, Woodmere, Marlands, Homestead, Elandsfontein, Kruinhof, Elandsfontein Rail, Isando, Croydon, Creslawn, Estherpark, Kempton Park West, Chloorkop, Lethabong, Halfway House Estate, Vorna Valley, Kyalami Hills, Kyalami Gardens	Germiston, Kempton Park, Midrand	Guthrie Rd, Brug St, Olivier Rd (M53), Simon Bekker Rd, Lower Boksburg Rd (M46), Knights Rd, Stanley St, Main Reef Rd (R29), Homestead Rd, Barbara Rd, Isando Rd, Zuurfontein Rd, Allandale Rd, Kyalami Rd	
M40	East/West; North/South	M75 (Sandhurst) – M64 – M9 – M85 – M1 – M11 – M54 – M30 – M20 (cosigned) – R25 – M16 – M97 – M98 – M52 (Bedford Gardens)	Sandhurst, Sandown, Wynberg, Kew, Lyndhurst, Sunningdale, Silvamonte, Sandringham, St Andrews, Essexwold, Bedfordview, Oriel, Bedford Gardens	Sandton, Johannesburg, Bedfordview	Grayston Dr, Andries St South, Arkwright Dr, 2nd Ave, Pretoria Rd (M20), Kernick Rd, Dartford Ave, Daleview Rd, Northfield Ave, Avon Rd, Swemmer Rd, Club St, Clivin Dr, Boeing Rd West, Van der Linde Rd	
M41	North/South	R21 (Ravenwood) – M44 – N12 – R21 – M57 (Jet Park)	Ravenwood, Everleigh, Bartlett, Jet Park	Boksburg	Rondebult Rd, Yaldwyn Rd, Taljard Rd, Jones Rd, Griffiths Rd	
M43	North/South	M53 (Sotho Section) – N3 – R103 – R21 – R554 – M46 – M56 – R29 – M44 – N12 - M45 (joins) – R21 – M32 – M45 (leaves) - M91 – M57 (Birchleigh)	Sotho Section, Mfundo Park, Somalia Park, Villa Liza, Dawn Park, Windmill Park, Vandyk Park, Boksburg East Industrial, Anderbolt, Westwood AH, Impala Park, Atlas, Clear Water Estate, Bonaero Park, Pomona AH, Nimrod Park, Aston Manor, Glen Marais, Birchleigh	Vosloorus, Boksburg, Kempton Park	Bierman Rd, Barry Marais Rd, Van dyk Rd, Atlas Rd, Dann Rd, Veld St, Vlei St,	
M44	East/West	M39 (Elandsfontein) – M57 (cosigned) – N12 – R21 – M41 – M43 – M32 – R51 (Benoni AH)	Elandsfontein, Jet Park, Witfield, Hughes Settlements, Everleigh, Bardene, Beyers Park, Lakefield, Farrarmere, Northmead, Morehill, Rynfield, Fairlead AH, Benoni AH	Germiston, Boksburg, Benoni	North Reef Rd, Jet Park Rd, North Rand Rd, Lakefield Ave, Main Rd, 5th Ave, Snake Rd (M45), Pretoria Rd	
M45	North/South	R51 (near Dunnottar) – M63 – N17 – R554 (cosigned) – M46 (cosigned) – M56 (cosigned) – R29 (cosigned) – N12 – M44 (cosigned) – R23 (cosigned) – M43 (joins) – R21 – M32 – M43 (leaves) – M91 – M57 (Kempton Park CBD)	Dunnottar, Langaville, Kwa Thema Ext 7, White City, Deep Levels, Reservoir, Vulcania South, Witpoort Estates, Vulcania, Brakpan CBD, Anzac, Apex, Mackenzie Park, Morehill, Rynfield, Northmead, Brentwood, Bonaero Park, Nimrod Park, Kempton Park CBD	Nigel, Tsakane, Kwa-Thema, Brakpan, Benoni, Kempton Park	Dunnottar Aerodrome Dr, Vlakfontein Rd, 12th Ave, Ergo Rd, Springs Rd (R554), Denne Rd, Goods St, Voortrekker Rd (M46), Prince George Ave, Main Reef Rd, Snake Rd, O'Reilly Merry St, Cecelia Nestadt Rd, Great North Rd, Van Riebeeck Rd	
M46	East/West	M38/M31 (Tulisa Park) – N3/N12 – M48 (cosigned) – M93 – M37 – M49 – M53 – M39 (cosigned) – M35 – R21 (cosigned) – M56 – M43 – R23 – M45 (cosigned) – M56 – R51 – R29 (Casseldale)	Tulisa Park, Elandspark, Gosforth Park, South Germiston, Industries East, Delmore Park, Martin du Preezville, Boksburg CBD, Boksburg South, Boksburg East Industrial, Van Dykpark, Dalpark, Dalview, Brakpan CBD, Brenthurst, Dal Fouche, New Era, Springs CBD, Casseldale	Johannesburg, Germiston, Boksburg, Brakpan, Springs	Rand Airport Rd, Power St, Linton-Jones St, Lower Boksburg Rd, Commissioner St, Rondebult Rd (R21), Leeuwpoort Rd, Jubilee Rd, Airport Rd, Athlone St, Hendrik Potgieter Rd, Van Der Walt Rd, Voortrekker Rd, Prince George Ave, Olympia Rd, South Main Reef Rd, 5th Ave, Colliery Rd, Driehoek Rd, Clydesdale Rd	
M47	North/South	M18 (Delarey) – M8 – M69 – M86 – R564 – M67 – N14 / R28 (Ruimsig)	Delarey, Florida North, Florida Hills, Floracliffe, Constantia Kloof, Weltevreden Park, Allens Nek, Strubens Valley, Little Falls, Wilgeheuwel, Ruimsig	Roodepoort	Hendrik Potgieter Rd	Old R47
M48	North/South; East/West	M31 (Florentia) – M94 – M46 (cosigned) – M37 – M49 (Webber)	Florentia, Alberton CBD, Elandshaven, Gosforth Park, Denlee, Webber,	Alberton, Germiston	Du Plessis Rd, 2nd Ave, Andries Pretorius St, Van Riebeeck Ave, Alberton Rd, Rand Airport Rd (M46), Rand Airport Rd	
M49	North/South	M53 (Klippoortje) – M48 - M46 – M37 (Georgetown)	Estera, Lambton, Klippoortje North, Webber, Delville, South Germiston, Georgetown	Germiston	Webber Rd	
M52	East/West	M14 (Malvern East) – N3/M40 – M98 – M37 – M39 (Elandsfontein)	Malvern East, Bedford Gardens, Oriel, Bedfordview, Rietfontein, Sunnyrock, Sunnyridge, Activia Park, Elandsfontein	Germiston, Bedfordview	Van Buuren Rd, North Reef Rd,	
M53	North/South	M7 (Zonkizizwe) – M43 – N3 – R103 – R554 – M94 – N17 – M49 – M39 (cosigned) – M46 – M37 (cosigned) – R29 – M14 (Primrose Hill)	Zonkizizwe, Moleleki, Mabuya Park, Sotho Section, Spruitview, Roodebult, Roodekop, Buhle Park, Wadeville, Estera, Elsburg, Tedstoneville, Delville, South Germiston, Georgetown, West Germiston, Germiston CBD, Primrose Hill	Katlehong, Vosloorus, Germiston	Kaunda St, Mercury St, Leondale Rd, Osborne Rd, Olivier St, Elsburg Rd, Meyer St/Victoria St, Exodus Rd, Johan Rissik Rd	
M54	East/West	M40 (Wynberg) – N3 – R25 (Lakeside)	Wynberg, Alexandra, East Bank, Far East Bank, Modderfontein, Lakeside	Sandton, Alexandra	Arkwright Ave, Wynberg Rd, London Rd, Peace St	
M56	East/West	M46 (Boksburg South) – M43 – R23 (cosigned) – M45 (cosigned) – M46 – R29/R51 – R555 (Everest)	Boksburg South, Boksburg East Industrial, Benoni South, Rangeview Camp, Harry Gwala, Leachville, Anzac, Brakpan CBD, Huntingdon, Krugersrus, New State Areas, Rowhill, East Geduld, Petersfield, Everest	Boksburg, Benoni, Brakpan, Springs	Commissioner St, Lincoln Rd, Birmingham St, Lancaster Rd, Range View Rd (R23), New Kleinfontein Rd, Grey Ave, Prince George St (M45), Voortrekker Rd, Craven St, Hospital Rd, South Main Reef Rd, Cowles St, E Geduld Rd, Enstra Rd	
M57	North/South	R29/M37 (Primrose) – M39 – N12 – M44 (cosigned) – M41 – M99 – M16 – M32 (cosigned) – M90 – M45 – M89 - M43 – R23 – R25 (cosigned) – R562 – enters City of Tshwane	Primrose, Marlands, Elandsfontein, Jet Park, Isando, Rhodesfield, Kempton Park CBD, Allen Grove, Glen Marais, Birchleigh, Caleni, Hospital View, Clayville	Germiston, Boksburg, Kempton Park, Tembisa	Pretoria Rd, Kraft Rd, N Reef Rd (M44), Jet Park Rd, Pretoria Rd	
M59	North/South	M39 (Klopper Park) – M99 – M16 – M92 – M78 – M37 (Eastleigh)	Klopper Park, Croydon, Sebenza, Edenglen, Eastleigh	Germiston, Kempton Park, Edenvale	Barbara Rd, Driefontein Rd, Lunik Rd, Terrace Rd	
M60	East/West	N3 (Modderfontein) – M74 – M11 – M1 – M85 (Kramerville)	Modderfontein, Kelvin, Marlboro Gardens, Kramerville	Sandton	Marlboro Dr	
M61	North/South	Enters from Midvaal – R550 – M7 (cosigned) – M82 – R554 (Alrode)	Eden Park, Alrode South, Alrode	Alberton	Vereeniging Rd	
M63	North/South	R550 (near Nigel) – M45 – N17 – R51 (Pollak Park)	Prosperita, Dunnottar, Sharon Park, Selcourt, Selection Park, Pollak Park	Nigel, Springs	Nigel-Dunnottar Rd, Nigel Rd, Coaton Ave, Tonk Meter Way	
M64	North/South	M85 (Sandown) – M9 – M40 – M81 – M71 – M74 – M75 – R564 (Douglasdale)	Sandown, Morningside, Benmore Gardens, Northern Acres, River Club, Bryanston, Douglasdale	Sandton	West St, Benmore Rd, Outspan Rd, Ballyclare Dr, St. Audley Rd, Grosvenor Rd, Douglas Dr	
M67	North/South	R41 (Witpoortjie) – R24 – M18 (cosigned) – M86 – M47 – M5 – R114 (near Cosmo City)	Princess, Wilropark, Willowbrook, Zandspruit, Sonnedal	Roodepoort	Corlett Ave, Ontdekkers Dr (M18), C.R. Swart Dr, Doreen Rd, Peter Rd, Koniefer St, Copperhouse Rd	
M68	East/West; North/South	R554 (Lenasia) – M72 – M77 – M10 – M83 – N1 – R553 – M38 – R82 – M7 – R556 (Mulbarton)	Lenasia, Klipriviersoog, Chiawelo, Dhlamini, Moroka, Klipspruit, Power Park, Diepkloof, Mondeor, Winchester Hills, Suideroord, Glenanda, Glenvista, Mulbarton	Lenasia, Soweto, Johannesburg	Abubaker Asvat Dr, Chris Hani Rd, Columbine Ave, Vorster Ave, True North Rd	
M69	North/South	R564 (Florida) – M18 – M86 – M5 – M6 (Weltevreden Park)	Florida CBD, Florida Park, Constantia Kloof, Weltevreden Park	Roodepoort	Golf Club Terr, J.G. Strydom Rd,	
M70	East/West	M77 (Mmesi Park) – M10 – M83 – N1 – M5 – M7 (Ophirton)	Mmesi Park, Meadowlands West, Meadowlands East, Orlando, Noordgesig, Diepkloof, Theta, Booysens Reserve, Ophirton	Soweto, Johannesburg	Van Onselen St, Vincent Rd, Reverend Frederick S Modise Dr, Soweto Hwy, Ophir Booysens Rd	
M71	North/South	M11 (Parktown) – M9 – M27 – M1 – M7 – M17 – M16 – M20 – M30 – M8 – M13 – M27 – M6 – M75 – M64 – M81 – M74 – R564 – R55 (cosigned) - N1 - R101 (Randjespark)	Parktown, Richmond, Westcliff, Emmarentia, Greenside, Victory Park, Linden, Robindale, Ferndale, Kensington B, Bryanston, Magaliesig, Lonehill, Glenferness, Kyalami, Beaulieu, Crowthorne AH, Carlswald, Randjespark	Johannesburg, Randburg, Sandton, Midrand	Empire Rd, Barry Hertzog Ave, Rustenburg Rd, 1st Ave, Bram Fischer Dr, Main Rd, Main Rd (R55), Arthur Ave, Neptune Ave, Walton Rd, New Rd	
M72	North/South	M68 (Moroka) – M77 (Mofolo North)	Moroka, Molapo, Moletsane, Jabulani, Zondi, Mofolo North	Soweto	Koma St	
M74	East/West	M75 (Bryanston) – M64 – M81 – M71 – M9 (Cosigned) – M85 – M11 – M60 (Marlboro Gardens)	Bryanston, Morningside, Wendywood, Eastgate, Marlboro Gardens	Sandton	Bryanston Dr, Summit Rd, Rivonia Rd (M9), South Rd	
M75	East/West	M64 (Bryanston) – M74 – M71 – M81 (join) – M13 – M81 (leave) – M40 – M9/M85 (Sandhurst)	Bryanston, Lyme Park, Hurlingham, Glenadrienne, Parkmore, Sandhurst	Sandton	Cumberland Ave, Homestead Ave, Peter Pl, William Nicol Dr (M81), Sandton Dr	
M77	North/South	M68 (Moroka) – M79 – M72 – M70 – R41 (Cresswell Park)	Moroka, Jabavu, Mofolo North, Dobsonville, Mmesi Park, Bram Fischerville, Cresswell Park	Soweto, Roodepoort	Elias Motsoaledi St	
M78	North/South	R25 (Illiondale) – M59 – M16 – M99 – M59 (Klopperpark)	Illiondale, Sebenza, Edenglen, Harmelia, Klopperpark	Edenvale, Germiston	Laurie Rd, Betshana Rd, Harris Ave, Shelton Ave, Kruin St	
M79	East/West	M77 (Jabavu) – M10 – M83 – N1 – M5 (Nasrec)	Jabavu, Mofolo Central, Dube, Orlando West, Orlando East, Diepkloof, Nasrec	Soweto, Johannesburg	Zulu Dr, Mahalefele Rd, Pela St, Kumalo St, Sotasonke St, Masupha St, Ben Naude Dr, Rand Show Rd	Sometimes signed as M12
M80	North/South	M7 (Southdowns) – M82 – R554 (cosigned) – M95 (Randhart)	Southdowns, Albertsdal, Mayberry Park, Alrode, Randhart	Alberton	J.G. Strydom Rd, Potgieter St, Swartkoppies Rd (R554), Jacqueline Ave,	
M81	North/South	M27 (Hyde Park) – M75 (joins) – M13 – M75 (leaves) – M64 – M71 – M74 – N1/R511 (Epsom Downs)	Hyde Park, Sandhurst, Hurlingham, Parkmore, Glenadrienne, Bryanston, Epsom Downs	Sandton	William Nicol Dr	
M82	North/South	M61 (Alrode South) – M80 – R554 – M95 (Meyersdal)	Alrode South, Brackenhurst, Meyersdal	Alberton	Hennie Alberts St	
M83	North/South	M68 (Diepkloof – M79 – M70 (Diepkloof)	Diepkloof	Soweto	Immink Dr	
M84	North/South	M32 (Cresslawn) – M90 – M89 – R25 – M88 (Norkem Park)	Cresslawn, Kempton Park CBD, Van Riebeeck Park, Houtkapper Park, Norkem Park	Kempton Park	Kelvin Dr, Besembos Ave, Panorama Ave, Soutpansberg Dr, Mooirivier Dr	
M85	North/South	M9/M75 (Sandown) – M64 – M40 – M60 – M74 – R564 (Sunninghill)	Sandown, Eastgate, Wendywood, Gallo Manor, Woodmead, Sunninghill	Sandton	Katherine St, Bowling Ave	
M86	East/West	R24 (Oatlands) – R563 – R28 – M67 – R564 (cosigned) – M47 – M69 – M5 (Randpark Ridge)	Oatlands, Munsieville, Dan Pienaarville, Rant-en-Dal, Noordheuwel, Rangeview, Roodekrans, Wilropark, Helderkruiun, Kloofendal, Constantia Kloof, Weltevreden Park, Randpark Ridge	Krugersdorp, Roodepoort, Randburg	Robert Broom Dr, Wilgeroord Rd, Christiaan de Wet Rd (R564), Jim Fouche Dr	M86 sometimes signed as route in Kempton Park
M88	East/West	R25 (Estherpark) – M39 – M90 – R25 – Terenure. Terenure - M84 – R25 (Birchleigh North)	Estherpark, Edleen, Kempton Park West, Terenure, Birch Acres, Norkem Park, Birchleigh North	Kempton Park	Parkland Ave, Rienert Ave, Terenure St; Pongolarivier Dr, Mooifontein Rd (unconnected section)	Two sections unconstructed
M89	East/West	R25 (Van Riebeeckpark) – M84 – M57 (Birchleigh)	Van Riebeeck Park, Birchleigh	Kempton Park	De Wiekus Rd, Elgin Rd	
M90	East/West	M39 (Estherpark) – M92 – M84 – M57 – M91 (Kempton Park CBD)	Estherpark, Edleen, Van Riebeeckpark, Kempton Park CBD	Kempton Park	C.R. Swart Rd	
M91	North/South	M96 (Kempton Park CBD) – M90 – M45 – M43 (Aston Manor)	Kempton Park CBD, Nimrod Park, Aston Manor	Kempton Park	Monument Rd	
M92	North/South	M59 (Croydon) – M39 -M32 – M90 – M86 (Van Riebeeckpark)	Croydon, Spartan, Cresslawn, Edleen, Van Riebeeckpark	Kempton Park	Serena Rd, Green Ave	
M93	Northwest/Southeast	M2 (Driehoek) – M46 – M37 (Webber)	Driehoek, South Germiston, Webber	Germiston	Refinery Rd	
M94	East/West	M48 (Alberton CBD) – N3 – M37 (cosigned) – M53 – M39 – M35 (Cruywagenpark	Alberton CBD, Florentia, Verwoerdpark, Albermarle, Dinwiddie, Wadeville, Cruywagenpark	Germiston, Alberton	Kritzinger Rd, Grey Ave, Black Reef Rd (M37), Dekema Rd, Sarel Hattingh St	
M95	East/West	M7 (Mulbarton) – M68 – M11 – M82 – R59 – M80 – R554 (Randhart)	Mulbarton, Glenvista, Meyersdal, Randhart	Johannesburg, Alberton	Bellairs Dr, Michelle Ave	
M96	East/West	M57 (Kempton Park CBD) – M91 – M32 – R21 (Kempton Park CBD)	Kempton Park CBD	Kempton Park	Voortrekker Rd, Long Street	
M97	East/West	M22 (Kensington) – M40 – M16 (Edenvale CBD)	Kensington, Bedfordview, Dunvegan, Edenvale CBD	Johannesburg, Bedfordview, Edenvale	Nicol Rd, Skeen Blvd, Concorde Rd East, Boeing Rd East, 1st Ave	
M98	East/West	M22 (Kensington) – M40 – M52 – M37 (Bedfordview)	Kensington, Oriel, Bedfordview	Johannesburg, Bedfordview	Smith Rd, Kloof Rd	
M99	East/West	M57 (Isando) – M39 – M59 – M78 – M37 (Meadowbrook)	Isando, Klopperpark, Meadowdale, Meadowbrook	Kempton Park, Germiston, Bedfordview	Electron Ave, Herman Rd	

== Pretoria ==
No.	Direction	Description of route	Suburbs	Street names
M1	North/South	M2/M6 (Central), M2, R104, M4, R101, R514/M8, R80, R101, R513, R566 (Annlin)	Central, Pretoria West, Hermanstad, Mountain View, Parktown, Mayville, Annlin West, Annlin	E'skia Mphahlele (D.F. Malan) Dr., Paul Kruger Street
M2	East/West	N1/N4 (Hatfield), M7, M5, M3, M18, R101, M1, M22 (Pretoria West)	Hatfield, Arcadia, Central, Pretoria West	Pretorius St./Francis Baard (Schoeman) St., Nana Sita (Skinner) St., Charlotte Maxeke (Mitchell) St./Soutter St., Charlotte Maxeke (Mitchell) St.
M3	North/South	M18, M11, M6, M2, R104, M4	Central	Nelson Mandela Blvd.
M4	East/West	M5 (Central), M18, R101, M1, R55, R511 (west of Pretoria)	Central, Pretoria West, Danville, Atteridgeville	Struben St./Johannes Ramakhoase (Proes) St., Vom Hagen St.
M5	North/South	M7/M18/R21 (Fountains), M11, M6, M2, R104, M4, M22, M8, R101/R513	Muckleneuk, Sunnyside, Arcadia, Gezina, Wonderboom South, Annlin	Elandspoort Rd., Steve Biko (Mears St. and Jeppe) St./Troye St., Steve Biko (Beatrix) St./Hamilton St., Steve Biko (Voortrekker) Rd., Steve Biko (Voortrekker) Rd./Johan Heyns (H. F. Verwoerd) Dr.
M6	East/West	M1/M2 (Central), R101, M18, M3, M5, M7, M30, N1, M16, M33, M12, M10, R25 (rural east of Pretoria)	Central, Sunnyside, Brooklyn, Lynnwood, Lynnwood Glen, Lynnwood Ridge, Die Wilgers, Wapadrand	Visagie St., Kotze St., Jorissen St., Lynnwood Rd.
M7	East/West, North/South	M22 (Pta. Industrial), R101, N14, M18, M5/M18/R21, M9, M11, M6, M30, M2, R104, M22, M8 (Queenswood)	Pretoria Industrial, Groenkloof, Nieuw Muckleneuk, Brooklyn, Hatfield, Colbyn, Queenswood	Roger Dyason St., Eeufees Rd., Christina De Wit Ave., George Storrar Dr., Middel St., Jan Shoba (Duncan) St., Jan Shoba (Duncan) & Tompson Sts./Gordon Rd., Gordon Rd., Stead Ave.
M8	East/West	M1/R514 (Hermanstad), R101, M5, M5, M29, M7, M22, N1/N4, M15, M15, M14, M10 (Mamelodi)	Hermanstad, Capital Park, Gezina, Villeria, Môregloed, Kilner Park, Lindopark, Eersterust, Mamelodi	Trouw St./Flowers St., Frederika St./Nico Smith (Michael Brink) St., Nico Smith (Michael Brink) St., Stormvoël St., Denneboom Ave., Tsamaya St.
M9	NW/SE	M11, M7, N1	Sunnyside, Nieuw Mucklenuk, Waterkloof, Waterkloof Ridge	Florence Ribeiro (Queen Wilhelmina) Ave., Rigel Ave.
M10	East/West, NE/SW	R55 (Eldoraigne), M34, R101, N14 (fly-over), M24, M18 (fly-over), R21, M28, N1 (fly-over), M57, R50, M33, M30, M11, M6, N4, R104, M8, R513 (Mamelodi)	Eldoraigne, Lyttelton, Monument Park, Erasmuskloof, Elardus Park, Wingate Park, Constantia Park, Garsfontein, Valley Farm, Nellmapius, Mamelodi	Wierda Rd., Trichardt Rd., Solomon Mahlangu (Hans Strijdom) Dr.
M11	East/West, NE/SW	M18 (Central), M3, M5, M9, M7, M30, N1, M33, M10 (Faerie Glen)	Central, Muckleneuk, Brooklyn, Menlo Park Menlyn, Faerie Glen	Jeff Masemola (Jacob Mare) St./Scheiding St., Rissik St./ Justice Mohamed (Walker) St., Justice Mohamed (Walker) St., Justice Mohamed (Charles) St., Atterbury Rd.
M12	North/South	M6 (Die Wilgers), M13, N4, R104, M14 (Waltloo)	Die Wilgers, Meyerspark, Waltloo	Simon Vermooten Rd.
M13	East/West	N4, M12	Die Wilgers	Rossouw St.
M14	NE/SW	M16 (Lynnwood Manor), N4, R104, M12, M8 (Waltloo)	Lynnwood Manor, Silverton, Waltloo	Lynburn Rd., Tambotie Ave., Watermeyer St., Waltloo Rd.
M15	North/South	R104 (Bellevue), M8, M8, R513 (NE of Pretoria)	Bellevue, Silverton, Lindopark	Dykor St., Derdepoort Rd., Stormvoël St., Baviaanspoort Rd.
M16	North/South	M6 (Lynnwood Ridge), M14, R104 (Scientia)	Lynnwood Ridge, Scientia	Meiring Naude Rd., Cussonia Ave.
M17	North/South	R514 (Kirkney), R513, R566, M20, M42, M44 (Mabopane)	Kirkney, Rural NW of Pretoria, Soshanguve, Mabopane	Hornsnek Rd.
M18	North/West	R101/M22, M4, R104, M11, M3, M7/M5/R21, M7, M10 (fly-over), M25, N1, M34, M31, to Johannesburg	Central, Groenkloof, Lyttelton, Doringkloof, Irene	Bosman St./Thabo Sehume (Andries) St., Christina De Wit Ave., Botha Ave., Main Rd. Centurion
M19	NE/SW	M25 (Zwartkop), N1, M36, M31(Highveld)	Zwartkop, Highveld	John Vorster Dr.
M20	North/South	R513 (The Orchards), R566, M17, M21 (Soshanguve)	The Orchards, Rosslyn, Soshanguve	Doreen Ave., Hebron Rd.
M21	NE/SW	R513 (Ga-Rankuwa), N4, R566, M20, M39, M44, M43, M35, R101 (Hammanskraal)	Ga-Rankuwa, Mabopane, Soshanguve, Hammanskraal	Molefe Makinta (Lucas Mangope) Dr.
M22	East/West, North/South	R55 (Proclamation Hill), M7, M2, Cosigned with(R104, M1), M1, R101/M18, M5, M29, M7, M8 (Kilner Park)	Proclamation Hill, Pretoria West, Central, Rietondale, Queenswood, Kilner Park	Quagga Rd., WF Nkomo (Church) St., E'skia Mphahlele (D. F. Malan) Dr., Boom St./Bloed St., Dr. Savage Rd., Soutpansberg Rd., C.R. Swart Dr.
M23	NE/SW	R50, M30	Moreleta Park	De Villebois Mareuil Rd.
M24	East/West	R55 (Valhalla), R101, N14, M10 (Lyttelton)	Valhalla, Lyttelton	Stephanus Schoeman Rd., Alaric Rd., Paul Kruger St., Snake Valley Rd.
M25	East/West	M37 (Wierda Park), R101, N1 (fly-over), M19, M34, M18 (Lyttelton)	Wierda Park, Zwartkop, Lyttelton	Hendrik Verwoerd Dr., Gerhard St., Station Rd.
M26	NE/SW	R511 (SW of Pretoria), R55 (Laudium)	Erasmia, Laudium	Main Rd. Erasmia
M27	East/West	M37 (Rooihuiskraal), R101, M19, M34, M18 (fly-over), M28 (Pierre van Ryneveld)	Rooihuiskraal, Zwartkop, Lyttelton, Pierre van Ryneveld	Theuns van Niekerk St., Estcourt Ave., Lenchen Ave., River Rd., Theron St.
M28	North/South	M10 (Waterkloof Ridge), R21 (fly-over), M27, M31 (Pierre van Ryneveld)	Pierre Van Ryneveld, Waterkloof Ridge	Van Ryneveld Ave.
M29	North/South	M22 (Rietondale), M8 (Gezina), R513 (Montana), N4 (Doornpoort)	Rietondale, Gezina, Montana, Doornpoort	Parker St., 15th Ave, Frates Rd, Dr. Swanepoel Road.
M30	NE/SW	M7 (Hatfield), M6, M11, N1, M33, M10, R25 (rural east of Pretoria)	Hatfield, Brooklyn, Menlo Park, Menlyn, Garsfontein, Pretorius Park	Duxbury Rd., Brooklyn St., Dely Rd., Garsfontein Rd.
M31	East/West	M37 (Rooihuiskraal), R101, N1 (fly-over), M36, M19, M18, R21 (Irene)	Rooihuiskraal, Highveld, Irene	Uitsig St., Nellmapius Dr.
M33	North/South	M6 (Lynnwood Ridge), M11, M30, M10 (Constantia Park)	Lynnwood Ridge, Menlyn, Garsfontein, Constantia Park	January Masilela (Genl. Louis Botha) Dr.
M34	NW/SE	M10 (Eldoraigne), R114, N14, M25, N1 (fly-over), M36, M18 (Irene)	Eldoraigne, Clubview, Doringkloof, Irene	Saxby Ave., Lyttelton Rd., Jean Ave., Alexandra Ave.
M35	North/South	R566 (north-east of Pretoria), M39 (Soshanguve), M39 (Soshanguve), Exits Pretoria	Soshanguve	Soutpan Rd.
M36	NE/SW	M31, M19, M34	Highveld	Olievenhoutbosch Rd.
M37	North/South	R114 (Wierda Park), M25, N14 (fly-over), M31, N1, R101 (The Reeds)	Wierda Park, Rooihuiskraal, The Reeds	Rooihuiskraal Rd., Samrand Ave.
M39	East/West	R101 (rural north of Pretoria), M35, M35, R80, M43, M43, M20, M17 (fly-over), M44, M21, exits Pretoria	Mabopane, Soshanguve	Mabopane Rd., Commissioner St, Rooiwalpad Rd.
M42	East/West	R80, M43, M17	Soshanguve	Ruth First Rd.
M43	North/South	M42, M39, M39, M21, M21	Soshanguve	Aubrey Matlala St., Unknown
M44	East/West	M21 (Mabopane), M39, M17, M20, M43, M35 (Soshanguve)	Mabopane, Soshanguve	Unknown

== Durban ==
No.	Direction	Description of route	Suburbs	Street names	Other
M1	North/South then East/West	M13 / M31 (Westmead) – N3 – M34 – M22 – M20 – N2 – R102 (Mobeni West)	Westmead, Ashley, Caversham Glen, Mariannhill, Mariannridge, Intake, Savannah Park, Crossmoor, Moorton, Arena Park, Westcliff, Havenside, Mobeni Heights, Mobeni West	Henry Pennington Rd, Higginson Highway, Grimsby Rd	
M4	North/South	N2 (Merebank, Start highway) – M7 – M11 – R102 (start cosigned) – N3 – M13 – M15 – R102 (end cosigned) – M12 – M17 (Start highway) – M21 – M41 – M12 – M27 – M43 (End highway) – N2 – R102 (near Shaka's Head)	Merebank, Austerville, Mobeni East, Clairwood, Rossburgh, uMbilo Industrial, Congela, Maydon Wharf, Esplanade, Warwick, Old Fort, Blue Lagoon, Prospect Hall, Broadway, Virginia, Glenashley, La Lucia, Umhlanga Rocks, Stratton-on-sea, La Mercy, Desainagar, Tongaat Beach, Genazano, Zimbali, Ballito	Sourthen Fwy, west street / Smith Street, Warwick Avenue / Market Rd (R102), Williams St / leopold St (R102), Old Fort Rd / Ordinance Rd, prince Alfred St / Stanger Street, stanger St, Northern Fwy, Ballito Dr	Part highway
M5	North/South then East/West	Starts at Kwa-Dabeka – M32 – M19 – M31 – M13 – M34 – M7 – M10 – M10 (cosigned) – M7 – R102 (uMbilo)	Kwa-Dabeka, Berkshire Downs, Falcon Industrial Park, Cowies Hill Park, Sarnia, Moseley Park, Glen Park, Moseley, Northdene, Escombe, Malvern, Hillary, Bellair, Sea View, Rossburgh, uMbilo	Dinkelman Rd, Otto Volek Rd, Stapleton Rd, Underwood Rd, Main Rd, Sarnia Rd	
M7	East/West	M13 / M19 (Hatton Estate, Start highway) – N3 – M34 – M5 – N2 (end of Highway) – M10 – R102 (start cosign) – M5 – R102 (end cosign) – M4 – M16 (cosigned) – ends at Brighton Beach	Hatton Estate, Farningham Ridge, Moseley Park, Northdene, Escomb, Malvern, Hillary, Carrington Heights, Rossburgh, Sea View, Clairwood, Wentworth, Brighton Beach	M7 Freeway, Solomon Mahlangu Dr, Old Mission Rd, Brighton Rd, Grays Inn Rd	Part highway
M8	North/South	M9 (Glenwood) – M11 – M13 – M15 – M17 (Essenwood)	Glenwood, Bulwer, Musgrave, Essenwood	ZK Matthew's}Rd, Bulwer Rd, Cleaver Rd, Botanic Gardens Rd, cowey Rd	
M9	East/West	M32 / M10 (Wiggins) – M8 – R102 – ends at Congella	Wiggins, Glenwood, Congella	Francisco Rd	
M10	East/West then North/South	M5 (Escombe) – M22 – M20 – M5 (cosigned) – M7 – M9/M32 – M13 (cosigned) – M15 – M17 – M19 (Springfield)	Escombe, Queensmead, Mount Vernon, Hillary, Bellair, uMkumbaan, Wiggins, Cato Crest, Waterval Park, Sparks, Sydenham, Springfield	Stella Rd, Sarnia Rd (M5), Wakesleigh Rd, Vusi Mzemela Rd, jam smuts Hwy (M13), brick field Rd, Alpine Rd	
M11	East/West	M8 (Bulwer) – R102 – M4 (Esplanade)	Bulwer, Esplanade	Che Guevara Rd	
M12	North/South	M4 (Old Fort) – M17 – M41 – M4 (Umhlanga Rocks)	Old Fort, Stamford, Blue Lagoon, Prospect Hill, Broadway, Glen Hills, Glen Anil, Sunningdale, Somerset Park, Westridge, Umhlanga Rocks	NMR Ave, Kenneth Kaunda Rd, Umhlanga Rocks Dr	
M13	East/West	N3 (near Assagay, Start highway) – M46 - R103 – M39 – M39 – M1/M31 – M7/M19 – M5 – N3 – M31 – N3 – M32 – M15 (End highway) – N3 – M10 (cosigned) – R102/M4 (Warwick)	Assagay, St Helier, Gillitts, Kloof, Fields Hill, Padfield Park, Manor, Westmead, Ashley, Hatton Estate, Cowies Hill Park, Woodside, Grayleigh, Beverley Hills, Sherwood, Watervall Park, Westridge, Bulwer, Warwick	King Cetshwayo Hwy, King Dinuzulu Rd, Cannongate Rd/Chris Ntuli Rd	Part highway
M15	East/West	R102 / M4 (Warwick) – M8 – M10 – M13 (Sparks)	Warwick, Essenwood, Sydenham, Sparks	Cross St / grey St, Gladys Manzi Rd, John Zikhali Rd, ridge Rd, South Rd, Moses Kotane Rd, Locksley Dr	
M16	Southwest / Northeast	R102 (Montclair) – M7 (cosigned) – ends at Fynnlands	Montclair, Jacobs, Clairwood, Grosvernor, Fynnlands	Bluff Rd	
M17	East/West	M10 (Morningside) – M17 – R102 – M12 – M4 (Old Fort)	Morningside, Windermere, Essenwood, Old Fort	Hendry Rd, Earl Haig Rd, Springfield Rd, Argile Rd	
M19	East/West	M7 / M13 (Hatton Estate, Start highway) – M31 – M32 – M5 – M32 – N2 (End highway) – M10 – R102 (Puritan Hills)	Hatton Estate, Pinetown CBD, Falcon Industrial Park, Atholl Heights, Reservoir Hills, Palmiet, Springfield, Puritan Hills	St Johns Ave, M19 Hwy, Umgeni Rd	Part highway
M20	North/South	M10 (Mount Vernon) – M1 (Bayview)	Mount Vernon, uMhlatuzana, Bayview	Hillary Rd, Chatsworth Main Rd	
M21	North/South then East/West	M25 (Phoenix Industrial) – M45 – N2 – R102 – M4 (Prospect Hill)	Phoenix Industrial, KwaMashu, Siyanda, Newlands West, Steelcastle, Newlands East, Parlock, Springfield Flats, Riverside, Prospect Hil	Malandela Rd, Inanda Rd, Riverside Rd	
M22	North/South	M10 (Queensmead) – M1 (Westcliff)	Queensmead, Kharwastan, Westcliff	Carrick Rd, Erica Ave, Astral Dr	
M25	East/West	Starts in eMachobeni – M27 – M26 - M21 – R102 (cosigned) – N2 (near Avoca Hills)	eMachobeni, Glebe, Congo, Langalibalele, Mshayazafe, Newtown, eZimangweni, eMzomusha, Phoenix Industrial, KwaMashu, Duff's Road	Curnick Ndlovu Hwy	
M26	North/South	R102 (Palmview) – M25 (Phoenix Industrial)	Palmview, Shastri Park, Brookdale, Northcroft, Starwood, Whetstone, Redfern, Phoenix Industrial	Gopalall Hurbans Rd, JG Champion Dr, Phoenix Hwy, Industrial Park Rd	
M27	North/South then East/West	M25 (Congo) – R102 – N2 – M4 – ends in uMdloti	Congo, amaTikwe, Tafula, Goqokazi, eKafuleni, Trenance Park, Dawncrest, Cordoba Gardens, Mountview, Brindhaven, Lotusville, Southridge, Waterloo,	Mafukuzela Hwy, Jabu Ngcobo Dr,	
M29	North/South then East/West	M5 (Sea View) – R102 (Mobeni)	Sea View, Coedmore, Yellowwood Park, Woodlands, Mobeni	Coedmore Rd, Kenyon Howden Rd	
M30	East/West	R603 (near uMbumbulu) – M35 – R102 (uMlazi)	uMbumbulu, uMlazi	Griffiths Mxenge Hwy	
M31	East/West	M1 / M13 (Westmead) – M19 – M32 – M5 – M13 (Cowies Hill Park)	Westmead, Pinetown CBD, Cowies Hill Park	Josiah Gumede Rd	
M32	East/West	M31 (Pinetown CBD) – M19 – M39 – M5 – M19 – M13 – N3 – M10/M9 (Wiggins)	Pinetown CBD, Pineside, The Wolds, Clermont, Atholl Heights, Grayleigh, Beverley Heights, Blackhurst, Wiggins	Beviss Rd, Qashana Khuzwayo Rd, Roger Sishi Rd, Jan Hofmeyr Rd, St James Ave, Harry Gwala Rd	
M33	East/West	R103 (Hillcrest) – M39 – M39 (Kloof CBD)	Hillcrest, Belvedere, Waterfall, Forest Hills, Everton, Kloof CBD	iNanda Rd, Link Rd, Bridle Rd, Kloof Falls Rd, Church Rd, Old Main Rd	
M34	North/South	M5 (Moseley Park) – M7 – M1 (Savannah Park)	Moseley Park, Highlands Hills, Nirvana Hills, Shallcross, Savannah Park	Hans Dettman Hwy	
M35	East/West	R603 (near Folweni) – N2 – M30 (uMlazi)	Folweni, Malukazi, Lotus Park, Isipingo Hills, Isipingo Rail, uMlazi	Sbu Magwanyane Dr, Wanda Cele Rd	
M37	East/West	R603 (near Adams Mission) – N2 – R102 (Amanzimtoti)	Adams Mission, Adams Rural, Malagazi, Amanzimtoti	Moss Kolnik Dr	
M39	East/West	M33 (Kloof CBD) – M13 – M13 – M33 – M32 (The Wolds)	Adams Mission, Adams Rural, Malagazi, Amanzimtoti	Moss Kolnik Dr	
M41	North/South	R102 (Hoylake Village) – N2 – M12 – M4 (La Lucia)	Hoylake Village, Cherry Hills, Somerset Park, La Lucia	M41	
M43	East/West	R102 (Gandhinagar) – N2 – M4 (Westbrook)	Gandhinagar, Westbrook	uShukela Dr (Watson Highway)	
M45	North/South	R102 (Parkhill) – N2 – M21 (KwaMashu)	Parkhill, Kenville, Melkhoute, KwaMashu	Queen Nandi Dr	
M46	North/South	N3 (near Assagay) – M59 - M13 – R103 (Assagay)	Assagay, Hillcrest	Kassier Rd	
M59	East/West	Starts in Outer West Durban – M46 (near Hillcrest)		Cliffdale Rd	
M65	East/West	R102 (near Nyaninga) – N2 (near La Mercy)		Dube Blvd	

== Bloemfontein ==
No.	Direction	Description of route	Suburbs	Street names
M10	East/West / North/South / East/West	M13 (Fauna) - M30 - M12 - M12 - R702 - N8 - M30 / M19 (Noordhoek)	Fauna, Hamilton, Mangaung, Peter Swart, Oos Einde, Noordhoek	Vereeniging Extension Rd., Rudolf Greyling Ave.
M11	East/West / North/South	M30 (Oranjesig) - R700 (cosigned one block) - R700 - R706 - M19 - M14 - N8	Oranjesig, Willows, Universitas, Park West	Rhodes Ave., President Ave., Victoria Rd., Donald Murray Ave., Pres. Paul Kruger Ave., D. F. Malherbe Ave.
M12	North/South	R702 (Heidedal) - M15 - M12 - M10 - doubles back - M10 - M12	Heidedal, various parts of Mangaung	Mkuhlane St., Ramatsoele St., Moshoeshoe St., Chief Moroko Cres., Modimogale St., Makoane St., Zulu St., Dhlabu St.
M13	NE/SW	R702 (Central) - M15 - M30 - M10 - Exits town toward Ferreira, Free State	Central, Oranjesig, Uitsig, Fauna	Hanger St. / Harvey Rd., Harvey Rd., Monument Rd., Memoriam Rd., Ferreira Rd.
M14	East/West, North/South	M11 - under N1 - R64	Universitas, Langenhoven Park	Wynand Mouton St., Totius St., Bankvos Blvd., Du Plessis Ave.
M15	North/South	R700 (Oranjesig) - M30 - M13 - M16 - M12	Oranjesig, Batho, Mangaung	Fort Hare Rd., Tsoai Rd.
M16	NE/SW	N8 - R702 - M15	Ooseinde, Batho	McGregor St.
M19	East/West, North/South, East/West	N1/N8 (Gardenia Park) - M11 - N8 - R700 - M30/M10 (Noordhoek)	Gardenia Park, Wilgehof, Willows, Westdene, Heuwelsig, Hillsboro, Baysvalley, Waverly, Noordhoek	Haldon Rd., Parfitt Ave., Gen. Dan Pienaar St., Deale Rd., Wilcocks Rd.
M30	North/South	N6 (south of Mangaung) - M10 - M13 - R700 - M15 - M11 - N8 - M19 / M10 - N1 (interchange, north of town)	Hamilton, Oranjesig, Central, Hilton, Noordhoek	Church St., St. George St., East Burger St., Andries Pretorius St.

== Port Elizabeth ==
No.	Direction	Description of route	Suburbs	Street names
M1	East/West	N2 (at level of Bluewater Bay) - R102 (at level of Amsterdamhoek)	Bluewater Bay, Amsterdamhoek	Weinronk Way, Hillcrest Dr., Riverside Dr., Tippers Creek, Amsterdamhoek Dr.
M3	East/West	N2 (at level of Deal Party) - R102 (same)	Deal Party	John Tallant Rd.
M4	North/South, then NW/SE then East/West	R102 (at Deal Party, south of M3) - N2 (interchange, freeway starts) - M5 (interchange) - M7 (interchange) - M9 (freeway ends) - M13 - M11 - M13 - ends in Schoenmakerskop at intersection with M18	Deal Party, North End, Central, South End, Humewood, Summerstrand, Schoenmakerskop	Baxter St., Burman Rd., Settlers Freeway, Humewood Rd., Beach Rd., Marine Dr.
M5	NE/SW	M4 (at level of North End) - R102 - M10 - M26 - R102 (Mill Park)	North End, Mount Croix, Mill Park	Mount Rd.
M6	East/West	R75 (Despatch (cosigned with M19) - M19 (Eastern Despatch) - R75 (Western Despatch) - R334 / M20 (Uitenhage)	Despatch, Uitenhage	Main St., Botha St., Union Ave., Caledon Ave.
M7	East/West	M4 (North End) - R102 - R102 (Mill Park) - M18 - M12 (cosigned for 1 block) - M15 (cosigned for 2 blocks) - N2 (interchange) - R102 (Linton Grange)	North End - Central - Mill Park - Walmer - Springfield - Lorraine - Sunridge Park - Framesby - Linton Grange	Albany Rd., Roseberry Ave., Target Kloof Rd., River Rd., Outspan Rd., 8th Ave., Main Rd., 17th Ave., Circular Dr., Kragga Kamma Rd., Samantha Way, Bramlin St.
M8	NE/SW	N2 (Sidwell) - R75 - M10 - M26 - R102 (Newton Park)	Sidwell, Korsten, Perridgevale, Newton Park	Kempston Rd., C. J. Langhenhoven Dr.
M9	East/West	M4 (South End) - M11 - M18 - M12 - leaves town to Seaview - M15 (area of Colleen Glen)	South End, Walmer, Greenshields Park, Charlo, Mount Pleasant, Seaview	Walmer Blvd., Heugh Rd., Buffelsfontein Rd.
M10	SE/NW (mostly)	R102 (North End) - M5 - M8 - N2 - changes to NE/SW as Nooitgedacht Road - M14 - resumes SE/NW - M19 - M22 - R334 / M20	North End, Sydenham, Sidwell, Gelvandale, Cleary Park, Salsoneville, Loonatville, Booysen Park - Khayamnandi - Despatch - Uitenhage	Harrower Rd., Standford Rd., Nooitgedacht Rd., Old Uitenhage Rd., Algoa Rd., Durban St.
M11	East/West	M4 (Humewood) - M13 - Port Elizabeth Airport - M9 (Walmer)	Humewood, Forest Hill, Walmer	La Roche Dr., Allister Miller Dr., 3rd Ave
M12	North/South	N2 (Cotswold) - M26 - R102 - M7 - M9	Cotswold, Newton Park, Mangold Park, Walmer Downs, Walmer, Springfield, Charlo	Disa Ave., William Moffett Expressway, 17th Ave.
M13	SE/NW	M4 (Humewood) - M11 - M4 (Summerstrand)	Humewood, Forest Hill, Summerstrand	Driftsands Dr., Strandfontein Rd., Admiralty Way
M14	East/West	R367/M19 (Perseverance) - R75 - R368/M16 - M10	Perseverance, Kwamagxaki, Govan Mbeki, Kleinskool, Kwanoxolo, Booysen's Park	Main Rd., Old Uitenhage Rd.
M15	East/West	N2 (Sunridge Park) - M7 - M7 - leaves town - M9 - N2 (out of town)	Sunridge Park, Lorraine, Kamma Park, Theescombe	Kragga Kamma Rd., Seaview Rd.
M16?	SE/NW	R75 (Missionvale) - M14	Missionvale, Govan Mbeki	Old Uitenhage Rd.
M17	North/South	R335 (Motherwell) - R367/M19 (Swartkops)	Motherwell, Swartkops	Dibanisa Rd.
M18	North/South	M7 (Walmer) - M9 - M4	Walmer, Gqebera, Schoenmakerskop	10th Ave., Victoria Dr.
M19	ESE/WNW	R102 (Swartkops) - M17 - M14 - R75 - M6 (co-signed) - M6 - R75 - M10 (Despatch)	Swartkops, Perseverance, Despatch	Trunk Rd., Main St., Botha St.
M20?	East/West	R102 (north of Mdantsane) - R335 - R75 - M10	Motherwell, Uitenhage	Daniel Pienaar St., Graaff-Reinet Rd., Church St.
M21?	From R334 in Kwa-Nobuhle (details sketchy)			
M22	M6 - M10 - ?	Uitenhage	Marconi St., Mel Brookes Ave, ?	
M26	East/West	M5 (North End) - M8 - M12 (Newton Park)	North End, Kensington, Adcockvale, Newton Park	Diaz Rd., Burt Dr.

== Pietermaritzburg ==
No.	Direction	Description of route	Suburbs	Street names	Other
M10	North/South	R33 (Mountain Rise) – R33 (Bombay Heights)	Mountain Rise, Allandale, Raisethorpe, Bombay Heights	Chota Motala Rd	
M20	East/West then North/South	M80 (Pietermaritzburg CBD) – M70 – M30 - N3 – M30 - R33 (Mountain Rise)	Pietermaritzburg CBD, Willowton, Mountain Rise	Masukwana St, Ohrtmann Rd	
M30	North/South	M20 (Pietermaritzburg CBD) - M20 - M20 - R33 (Copesville)	Pietermaritzburg CBD, Willowton, Mountain Rise, Eastwood, Panorama. Whispers, Copesville	Larch Rd, Manning Ave, Chief Mhlabunzima Rd, Copesville Dr	
M40	North/South	R56 (Scottsville) – M70 – M80 – N3 (Northern Park)	Scottsville, Pietermaritzburg CBD, Northern Park	Boshoff St, Chatterton Rd	
M50	East/West	M70 (Masons Hill) – R56 – R103 (Mkondeni)	Masons Hill, Ridge Park, Westgate, Hazelmere, Oribi Heights, Bisley Heights, Murrayfield Park, Mkondeni	Archie Gumede Rd, Gladys Manzi Rd	
M70	East/West	R617 (near Boston Park) – M50 – R103 – M40 – M20 – N3/R33 (Willowton)	Elandskop, Taylor's Halt, Zibomvini, Draaihoek, Dambuza, Dlaba, Edendale Town, Mason's Mill, Camp's Drift, Pietermaritzburg CBD, Willowton	Selby Msimang Rd, Church St	
M80	East/West then North/South	M20 (Pietermaritzburg CBD) – M40 – R103 (cosigned) – R103 – N3 – ends near Hilton College	Pietermaritzburg CBD, Prestbury, Lester Park, Boughton, Sweet Waters, Winterskloof, Mount Michael, Mountain Home, Hilton CBD, Hilton Gardens	Hoosen Haffajee St / Pietermaritz St, Mayors Wk, Zwartkop Rd, Mbubu Rd, Sweetwaters Rd, Dennis Shepstone Dr, Hilton Ave	
