= M21 (Pretoria) =

Road in Pretoria, South Africa

Metropolitan route M21

Route information
- Maintained by City of Tshwane Metropolitan Municipality
- Length: 53.4 km (33.2 mi)

Major junctions
- South-west end: R513 near De Wildt
- N4 near De Wildt; R566 near Ga-Rankuwa; M20 near Mabopane M39 in Winterveld M43 in Soshanguve M35 in Soshanguve
- North-east end: R101 in Hammanskraal

Location
- Country: South Africa
- Major cities: Ga-Rankuwa, Mabopane, Soshanguve, Hammanskraal

Highway system
- Numbered routes of South Africa
← M20	→ M22

The M21 road is a long metropolitan route in the City of Tshwane in Gauteng, South Africa. It connects Ga-Rankuwa with Hammanskraal via Mabopane and Soshanguve.

== Route ==
The M21 route begins at a junction with the R513 route (Brits Road) just south of De Wildt in the North West Province. It heads northwards to cross the N4 highway (Platinum Highway; westbound only) just east of the N4's Brits Toll Plaza. It continues north to meet the R566 route at De Wildt before entering the township of Ga-Rankuwa in Gauteng as Kware Street.

It heads north-north-east through the centre of Ga-Rankuwa to pass through Hebron (where it meets the north-western terminus of the M20 route) as the Molefe Makinta Highway (formerly Lucas Mangope Highway) before passing through Mabopane. In the town of Winterveld, the M21 bends to the east-north-east and meets the M39 route before passing through the northern part of Soshanguve, where it meets the M35 route.

After Soshanguve, the M21 turns northwards into Nuwe Eersterus, then eastwards at the Mogogelo Road junction, to reach the township of Hammanskraal, where it makes a right turn and becomes Herry Gwala Avenue before crossing the Apies River and reaching its end at a junction with the R101 route (Old Warmbaths Road).
