= M17 (Pretoria) =

Road in Pretoria, South Africa

Metropolitan route M17

Route information
- Maintained by City of Tshwane Metropolitan Municipality
- Length: 32.3 km (20.1 mi)

Major junctions
- South end: R514 in Kirkney
- R513 near Chantelle; R566 near Rosslyn; M20 in Soshanguve M42 in Mabopane

- North end: M44 in Mabopane

Location
- Country: South Africa
- Major cities: Pretoria, Soshanguve, Mabopane

Highway system
- Numbered routes of South Africa
← M16	→ M18

The M17 road is a metropolitan route in the City of Tshwane in Gauteng, South Africa. It connects the suburb of Kirkney in Pretoria with the northern parts of Soshanguve and Mabopane.

== Route ==
The M17 route begins in the suburb of Kirkney (north-west of Pretoria CBD; just west of Booysens), at a junction with the R514 route (Van Der Hoff Road). It heads north-west as the Horns Nek Pass for 8.8 kilometres to reach a junction with the R513 route (Brits Road). The R513 joins the M17 and they are one road northwards for 400 metres before the R513 becomes its own road eastwards towards Chantelle.

The M17 continues northwards to meet the N4 highway (Platinum Highway; Pretoria Northern Bypass) (eastbound only) before reaching a junction with the R566 route just west of Rosslyn. The M17 joins the R566 eastwards for 1.4 kilometres before becoming its own road northwards (Molotlegi Road). It bends westwards before leaving Molotlegi Road to become the road northwards, bypassing Ga-Rankuwa to the east.

The M17 continues northwards from the Molotlegi Road junction for 6.3 kilometres to reach a junction with the M20 route in the southern part of Soshanguve. It continues northwards for 6.1 kilometres, parallel to a railway (which separates Mabopane in the west from Soshanguve in the east), to pass under the M39 route. It continues northwards for 4 kilometres, still parallel to the railway, to reach its end at a junction with the M44 route.
