= M35 (Pretoria) =

Road in Pretoria, South Africa

Metropolitan route M35

Route information
- Maintained by City of Tshwane Metropolitan Municipality
- Length: 37.6 km (23.4 mi)

Major junctions
- South end: R566 near Pretoria North
- M39 near Soshanguve M44 in Soshanguve; M21 in Soshanguve
- North end: Moeka, North West

Location
- Country: South Africa
- Major cities: Pretoria, Soshanguve

Highway system
- Numbered routes of South Africa
| ← M34 | → M36 |

The M35 road is a metropolitan route in the City of Tshwane in Gauteng, South Africa. It connects Pretoria North with a rural area north of Soshanguve.

== Route ==
The M35 route begins at a junction with the R566 route just north of the Pretoria North suburb. It begins by heading north-north-west for 14 kilometres, flying over the N4 highway (Platinum Highway; Pretoria Northern Bypass), bypassing the Bon Accord Dam to the west and the Onderstepoort Private Nature Reserve to the east, to reach a junction with the M39 route. The M39 joins the M35 and they are one road northwards for 2 kilometres before the M39 becomes its own road westwards towards Soshanguve Central.

The M35 continues northwards for 9 kilometres, through the eastern parts of Soshanguve, to reach a junction with the M21 route. The M35 continues northwards, bypassing the Tswaing crater in Nuwe Eersterus, to exit the City of Tshwane Metropolitan Municipality and reach the village of Moeka in the North West Province, marking its end.
