= M42 (Pretoria) =

Road in Pretoria, South Africa

Metropolitan route M42

Route information
- Maintained by City of Tshwane Metropolitan Municipality
- Length: 4 km (2.5 mi)

Major junctions
- East end: R80 in Soshanguve
- M43 in Soshanguve
- West end: M17 in Mabopane

Location
- Country: South Africa
- Major cities: Soshanguve, Mabopane

Highway system
- Numbered routes of South Africa
← M39	→ M43

The M42 road is a short metropolitan route in the City of Tshwane in Gauteng, South Africa. It consists of one street (Ruth First Road) in Soshanguve.

== Route ==
The M42 route begins in Soshanguve at an off-ramp junction with the R80 Mabopane Highway. It heads westwards as Ruth First Road through the southern part of Soshanguve, meeting the M43 route, to cross a railway and enter Mabopane, where it ends at a junction with the M17 route.
