= M44 (Pretoria) =

Road in Pretoria, South Africa

Metropolitan route M44

Route information
- Maintained by City of Tshwane Metropolitan Municipality
- Length: 10.7 km (6.6 mi)

Major junctions
- East end: M35 in Soshanguve

- M43 in Soshanguve; M17 in Mabopane M39 in Mabopane; M21 in Mabopane
- West end: Klipgat Road in Mabopane

Location
- Country: South Africa
- Major cities: Mabopane, Soshanguve

Highway system
- Numbered routes of South Africa
← M43

The M44 road is a short metropolitan route in the City of Tshwane in Gauteng, South Africa. It connects the north-eastern part of Soshanguve with the western part of Mabopane.

== Route ==
The M44 route starts at a junction with the M35 route in Soshanguve Block G. It heads westwards, meeting the M43 route and the northern terminus of the M17 route, to cross into Mabopane. It meets the M39 route and the M21 route north of Mabopane Central before ending in Mabopane Unit T at a junction with Klipgat Road.
