= M39 (Pretoria) =

Road in Pretoria, South Africa

Metropolitan route M39

Route information
- Maintained by City of Tshwane Metropolitan Municipality
- Length: 44.2 km (27.5 mi)

Major junctions
- East end: R101 near Pyramid
- M35 near Soshanguve; R80 in Soshanguve M43 in Soshanguve; M20 in Soshanguve M44 in Mabopane; M21 in Winterveld
- West end: Lebalangwe, North West

Location
- Country: South Africa
- Major cities: Mabopane, Soshanguve

Highway system
- Numbered routes of South Africa
← M37	→ M42

The M39 road is a metropolitan route in the City of Tshwane in Gauteng, South Africa. It connects a rural area north of Pretoria (Pyramid) with a rural area north-west of Pretoria (Lebalangwe) via Soshanguve and Mabopane.

== Route ==
The M39 route begins at a junction with the R101 route (Old Warmbaths Road) about 2 kilometres north of Pyramid. It heads westwards for 12.5 kilometres to reach a t-junction with the M35 route. The M39 joins the M35 and they are one road northwards for 2 kilometres before the M39 becomes its own road westwards to enter the town of Soshanguve.

After one kilometre, the M39 meets the northern terminus of the R80 highway (Mabopane Highway) at a t-junction and turns to the north-west. It heads for 3 kilometres through Soshanguve to reach a junction with the M20 route, where it enters the township of Mabopane. It passes north-north-west through the north-eastern part of Mabopane and reaches a junction with the M44 route, where it enters Winterveld.

It proceeds north-north-west from the M44 junction, meeting the M21 route and passing through Winterveld, to leave the City of Tshwane Metropolitan Municipality and enter the North West Province, where it passes through Mmakaunyana and ends at a junction just east of Lebalangwe and north-west of Moeka.
