= Sepitori =

Lingua franca of Pretoria and Tshwane

Pretoria Sotho
- Sepitori
- Native to: South Africa
- Region: Tshwane; parts of the North West- (Oukasie) (South African province)
- Language family: Sotho-Tswana language creole

Language codes
- ISO 639-3: None (mis)
- Glottolog: None
- Guthrie code: S.30A

Sepitori is the urban lingua franca of the black residents of the Tshwane metropolitan area in South Africa. It is also spoken in the townships and villages around Brits, and has been gaining momentum in Rustenburg. It is based on the Tswana language, particularly the Sekgatla dialect spoken in Hammanskraal, with major contributions from Northern Sotho and minor contributions from Southern Sotho, Nguni languages, Afrikaans, and English.

Though it is most commonly used in informal situations, it is also used in schools and at political events in which people have different language backgrounds. Standard Setswana and Northern Sotho (represented by Sepedi) are not commonly used in schools except in Setswana and Northern Sotho lessons. Pretoria Taal (or SePitori) is mutually intelligible with Setswana and Northern Sotho.

It is a very dynamic and fluid language that changes over time. Words such as stelle, stocko and wadijaja are new concepts used and did not exist a decade ago. Another interesting feature is that different parts of the city of Tshwane have different variations of the language. The Garankuwa, Mabopane and Hammanskraal regions, which are dominated by Tswana-speakers, speak a form that is closely linked to Setswana. The areas Soshanguve, Mamelodi and Atteridgeville are dominated by Sepedi speakers and speak a form that is closely linked to Sepedi, hence the use of words such as 'Bolela' or 'Nyaka' instead of 'Bua' or 'Batla' in Tswana. SoShaNguVe remains the most diverse as the name suggests SOtho (both Setswana and Sepedi) SHAngan ( Tsonga ) Nguni and Venda.

People in the Garankuwa and Mabopane areas would say 'Keya ko nna' for 'I am going home'. Residents of Mamelodi and Atteridgeville for example would say, 'Ke ya jarateng' they also might use 'keya ko nna' as well. While residents of Soshanguve for example would say 'keya jointeng or keya dladleng'

There is a strong relationship between it and Afrikaans and Tsotsitaal. Afrikaans is a fusion of the Dutch language and local Khoisan and Cape Malay variations. Tsotsitaal is a form of Afrikaans which is used in urban South Africa, originally by thugs trying to disguise their language. It was soon associated with being cool and with the times, and broader society began to use it.

Many criminals in urban areas were former mine workers, construction workers and farmers. In revolt against the industrial oppression and the apartheid regime in general, gangs began participating in criminal activities and would plot and scheme in crowded township environments. The people of Mamelodi like to incorporate the variations of other Pretorian townships. So most of the words used in other places are either considered obsolete or are adopted into the ever changing language. So you could say "Sepitori se metsi" which has multiple means depending on context in this it would mean that Sepitori is new.

In the Pretoria area, this became the language of di kleva (well-dressed township-dwellers who were trendy and up to speed with cultural developments). The high social status that came with being recognized as a kleva resulted in a growing number of people speaking that way. Tsotsitaal thus went from being a cult-like secret code to being a medium of communication in the urban areas around Gauteng.

Sepitori contains Afrikaans influences due to the language's prominence during apartheid. Well-dressed township dwellers (kleva) started utilising a combination of Afrikaans words in their speech, resulting in the language having terms such as Dae man, Ek sê, Daarso, Is waar, Nou die laas, and Jy verstaan, which are used on a daily basis. When greeting, people in the Pretorian area use the native Setswana greeting of Dumelang/ Ashe and the colloquial "Ek sê". The latter is preferred by the youth, while the former is generally used by elders and in official community events.

Sepitori has a separate set of words to use when talking about money. The people of the Pretoria-Tshwane area use words such as nyoko, zaka, lechankura and maphepha to refer to money.

An example of a sepitori passage would be:

Eintlek, s'pitori ke nthwe e te kopantshang wabona? Ge re ova s'pitori, a se gore re nyaka goba snaaks. Die ding ke s'praka sa rona. Re tlha ver le yona wang verstaan? Re ka seno betha sdudla mo spacing.
"Actually, sepitori is a thing that just goes with the flow, you see? When we speak sepitori it's not that we want to be rude. It's our language; we have been using it for a long time so we can't just abandon it."

References to monetary figures In Sepitori then English :

- 5 bob = 50 cents
- Dolla = 1 rand
- Bois/Pond = 2 rands
- Arr 5/Lekopi/Half mug = 5 rands
- Jacket = 10 rands
- Choko = 20 rands
- 5 Jacket/5 nought/Pinkies = 50 rands
- Klipa = 100 rands
- Leplanka/Custard/2 Klipa = 200 rands
- Tao/Stena/Blocko = 1000 rands
- Meter/Ferrari = 1,000,000 rands

A common expression in Pretoria is "dilo di nametse RunX" which means that things are going good.

SePitori is quickly becoming a first language. It is not known how many people speak it, as it is a mixed, informal language bridging both Sepedi and Setswana. If it is understood to be a language of its own, it would be the most spoken language in the northern parts of Gauteng and the eastern parts of the North-West Province, particularly Brits area because of its proximity to Pretoria.

Among young people in the City of Tshwane, it has become a primary language of communicating with each other.
