= Oukasie township =

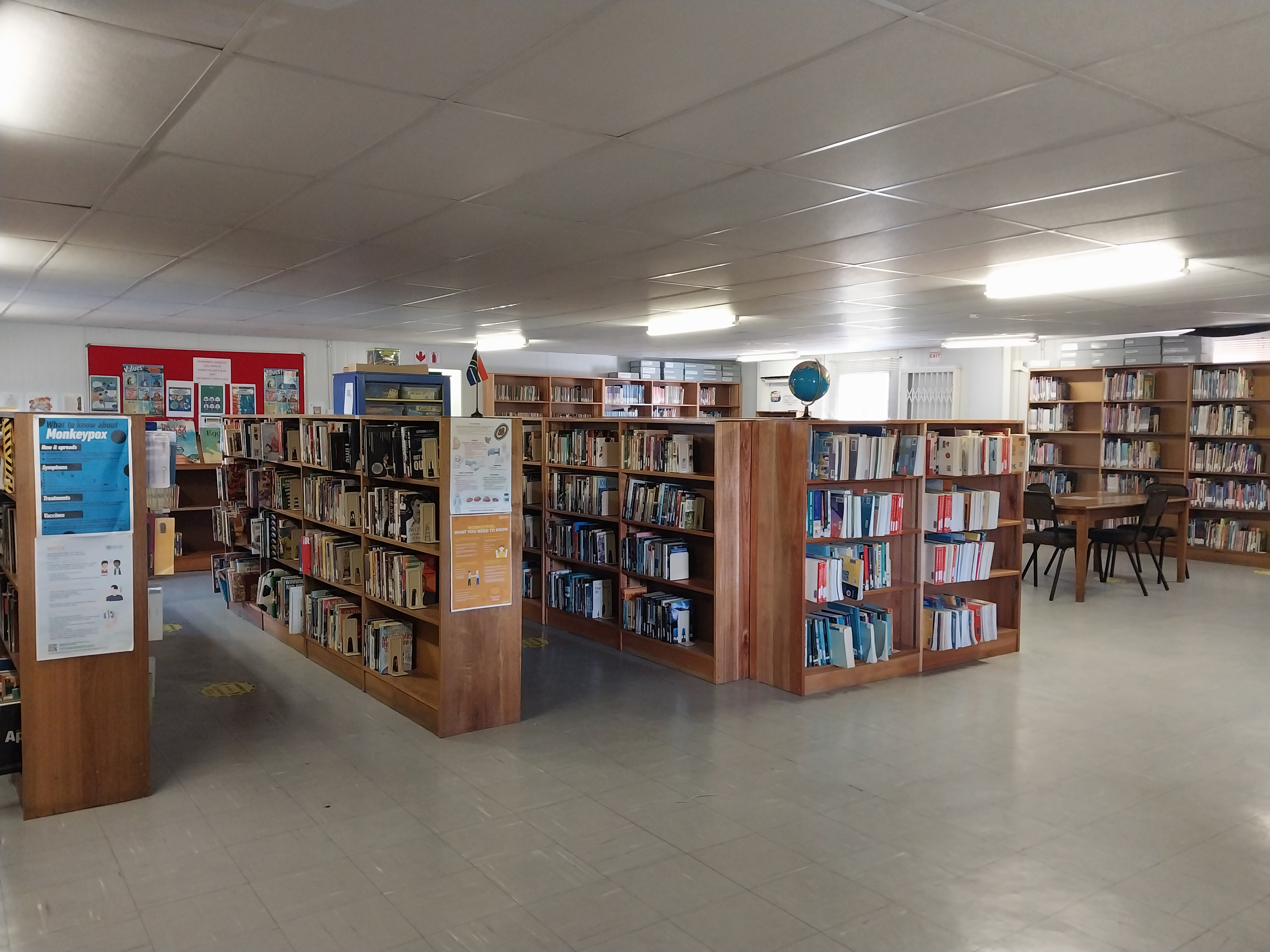
Oukasie Library

Oukasie Township is a township located north of Brits town in Madibeng Local Municipality in the North West Province of South Africa. The population of Oukasie is made up primarily of Black Africans from the Tswana, Pedi and Tsonga ethnic groups, with a small number of Coloureds and other race groups present as well. It was established in 1927 as a labour camp. In 2005 Oukasie was officially declared as a township. It is demarcated into several sub-sections namely:

- Masenkeng
- Greenside
- Vuka
- Noodkamp
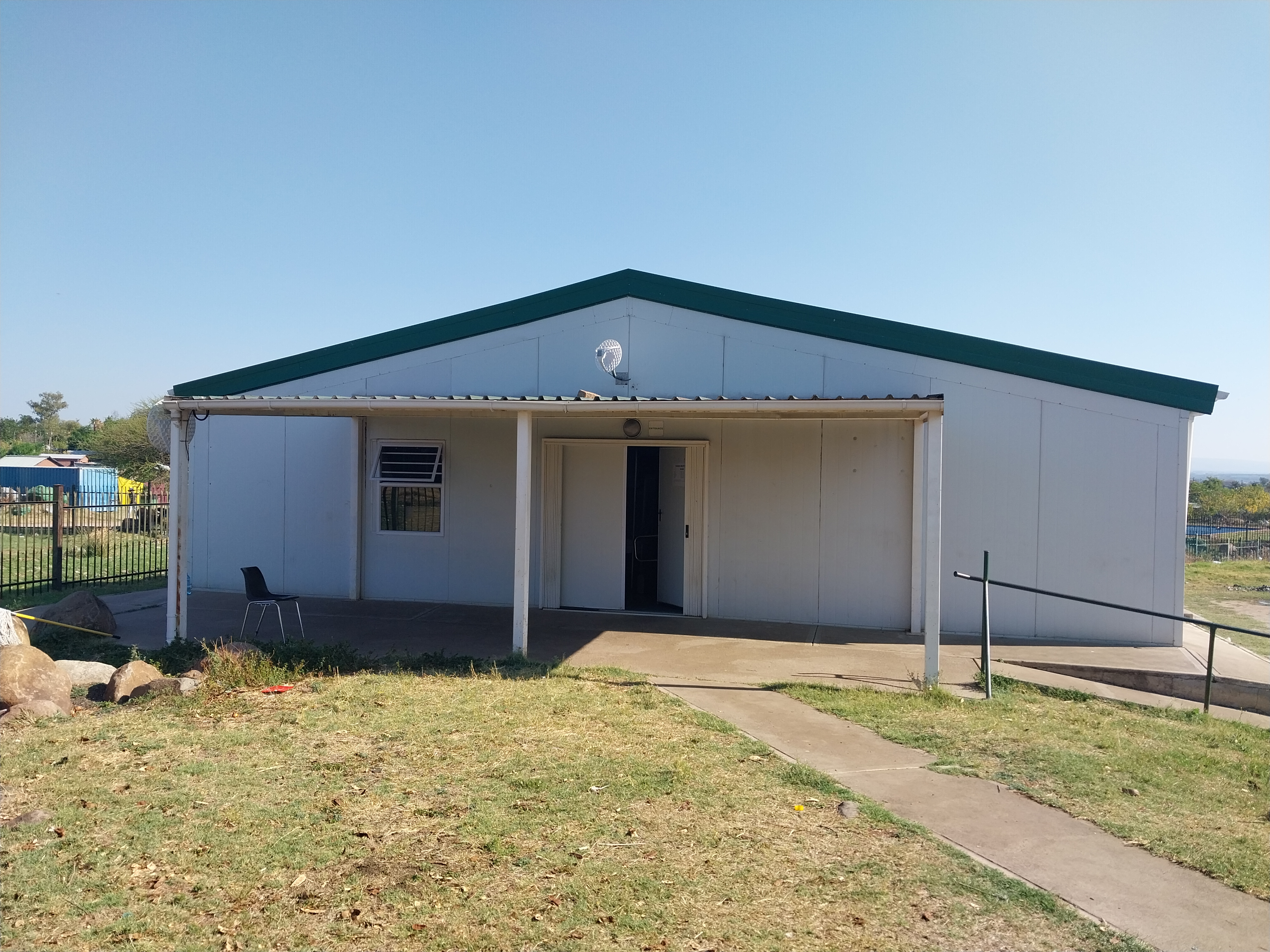
- Oukasie library building
  Phase 1
- Phase 2
- Phase 3

There are also informal settlements in Oukasie (i.e. Siyahlala, Mountainwiew, Lindelani, Phase 4 and Corrie Sanders).

== Forced removals ==
Little-to-no housing or municipal services had been provided to Oukasie by any government since its establishment, with the National Party being no exception during the Apartheid years. Efforts to relocate the residents of Oukasie took place through the 1960s and 1970s, with some moved to Soshanguve, Ga-Rankuwa and Mabopane townships near Pretoria, and others sent to Mothotlung, 10km North-East of Brits, and Lethabong in the Rustenburg municipality.

In 1985 the intention by government to relocate the people of Oukasie intensified, despite an official end to the state's policy of forced removals by this time. A newly developed township, Letlhabile, had been established more than 20km from Brits, with brick houses being made available to the small minority of Oukasie residents who could afford to purchase those plots. The official rationale for the move was the overcrowding and dilapidation of the Oukasie "slum", though it is widely believed that the intention was to break the growing trade union strength of the area, and distance the black residents of Oukasie from the white residents of Brits. With the failure of incentives such as monetary compensation and transport assistance, efforts to remove the residents of Oukasie continued to intensify. In October 1986, the government gazetted the repeal of Oukasie's status as a recognized town, after escalating tensions, police presence, and several attacks on local community leaders.

Grassroots organizing and pushback from local trade unions such as the National Union of Metalworkers of South Africa (NUMSA), successfully stalled the National Party's efforts until the end of Apartheid. The Brits transitional local government, which was elected in the mid-1990s, was led by Levy Mamabolo, a trade-unionist and anti-removal leader from Oukasie.

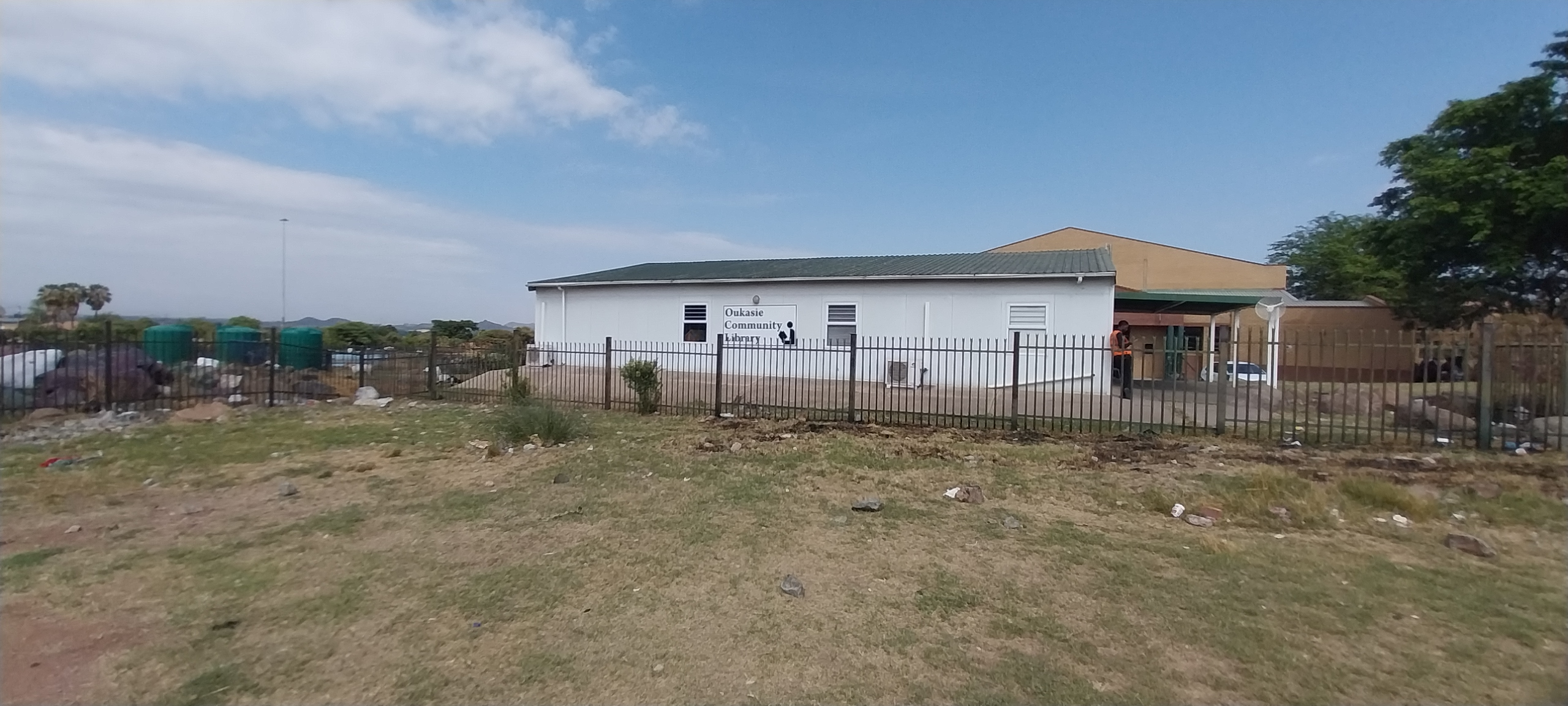
Oukasie library

== Schools ==
There are three primary schools and one high school in Oukasie namely:

- Odi Primary
- Kutlwano Primary
- Oukasie Primary
- Botlhabelo High

== Oukasie Development Trust (ODT) ==
Oukasie Development Trust (ODT) is an organisation that was formed to develop Oukasie after the community refused to be moved to Letlahabile. It was initiated by an activist named Jacob Moatshe together with other activists who were against the relocation of Oukasie township.
