= Soshanguve High School =

Soshanguve High School/ Soshanguve Secondary School
- Gauteng; South Africa

Information
- Type: Government
- Motto: Work and Pray
- Established: 1978
- Colours: Black & Lime

Soshanguve High School is a government secondary school located in Soshanguve, a township situated about 25 kilometres (16 mi) north of Pretoria.

== History ==
The school was founded in 1978.
