= M43 (Pretoria) =

Road in Pretoria, South Africa

Metropolitan route M43

Route information
- Maintained by City of Tshwane Metropolitan Municipality
- Length: 12.3 km (7.6 mi)

Major junctions
- South end: M42 near Soshanguve Central

- M39 near Soshanguve Central M44 in Soshanguve North
- North end: M21 in Soshanguve North

Location
- Country: South Africa
- Major cities: Soshanguve

Highway system
- Numbered routes of South Africa
| ← M42 | → M44 |

The M43 road is a metropolitan route in the City of Tshwane in Gauteng, South Africa. It is in the township of Soshanguve, connecting the central area with the northern area.

== Route ==
The M43 route begins at a junction with the M42 route (Ruth First Road) adjacent to Soshanguve Crossing Mall. It heads north through Soshanguve Central as Aubrey Matlala Street, bypassing the Tshwane University of Technology Soshanguve Campus, to reach a junction with the M39 route (Commissioner Street).

The M43 joins the M39 and they are one road westwards for 1 kilometre before the M43 becomes its own road northwards. It heads northwards through Soshanguve North for 4.7 kilometres, meeting the M44 route, to reach its end at a junction with the M21 route (Molefe Makinta Highway).
