= R80 (South Africa) =

Provincial route in South Africa

Provincial route R80

Route information
- Maintained by GDRT
- Length: 22.6 km (14.0 mi)

Major junctions
- North end: M39 in Soshanguve
- N4 in Akasia; R55 in Pretoria
- South end: M1 in Pretoria

Location
- Country: South Africa
- Major cities: Soshanguve, Akasia, Pretoria

Highway system
- Numbered routes of South Africa
← R76	→ R81

The R80 is a provincial route in the City of Tshwane Metropolitan Municipality in Gauteng, South Africa that connects the Pretoria CBD with Mabopane and Soshanguve. It is a dual carriageway freeway, with 2 or 3 lanes in each direction at different points and is named the Mabopane Highway.

== Route ==
Detailed Route

It starts at a t-junction with the M1 road of Tshwane in the suburb of Roseville (5km north of Pretoria CBD), heading westwards and meeting the R55 road. It passes through the Theo Martins Gateway (Afrikaans:Theo Martins Poort), a mountain pass over the Magaliesberg mountains, and the northbound carriageway has a rising hairpin bend, approaching the pass, as the freeway abruptly switches from an east-west to a south–north direction.

Proceeding northwards, the R80 meets the R513 road before forming an interchange with the N4 national route (Northern Pretoria Bypass; Platinum Highway) in Akasia.

The highway proceeds northwards to meet the R566 road at an off-ramp just east of Rosslyn and proceeds to end at a junction with the M39 road of Tshwane in Soshanguve, with the M39 providing access to Mabopane (which is just west of Soshanguve).

== History ==
There appears to be abandoned portions of the road near its southbound area where it connects to the M1, going until just north of where it cuts through the hill and into Akasia. It would appear that there were more directions planned for this road long ago, especially with the otherwise pointless cloverleaf loop that crosses over nothing.
