= M20 (Pretoria) =

Road in Pretoria, South Africa

Metropolitan route M20

Route information
- Maintained by City of Tshwane Metropolitan Municipality
- Length: 18.9 km (11.7 mi)

Major junctions
- South-east end: R513 in Chantelle
- R566 in Rosslyn; M17 in Soshanguve South
- North-west end: M21 in Hebron

Location
- Country: South Africa

Highway system
- Numbered routes of South Africa
← M19	→ M21

The M20 road is a metropolitan route in the City of Tshwane in Gauteng, South Africa. It connects Akasia with Hebron via Soshanguve.

== Route ==
The M20 route begins in Chantelle, Akasia, at a junction with the R513 route (Rachel De Beer Street). It begins by heading northwards for 5 kilometres as Doreen Avenue, separating the suburb of Chantelle in the west from the suburb of Wonderpark in the east, to fly over the N4 highway (Platinum Highway; Pretoria Northern Bypass) and pass through The Orchards before reaching a junction with the R566 Route in the industrial suburb of Rosslyn.

The M20 continues north-north-west for 7 kilometres, through the northern part of Rosslyn, to enter Soshanguve South, where it reaches a junction with Hebron Road. Here, the M20 becomes Hebron Road towards the north-west. It heads north-west for 7 kilometres, meeting the M17 route, to leave the City of Tshwane Metropolitan Municipality and enter the township of Hebron in the Madibeng Local Municipality, where it ends at a junction with the M21 route (Molefe Makinta Highway).
