= Horns Nek =

Coordinates: 25°40′58.9″S 28°04′07.4″E

- Interactive map of Horns Nek
- Elevation: 1,450m
- Traversed by: M17

Location
- Location: Hartebeesthoek, Gauteng
- Range: Magaliesberg

Horns Nek Pass is situated in the Gauteng province of South Africa, on the metropolitan road M17, within the urban area of Pretoria in the Tshwane Municipality. The pass crosses the Magaliesberg mountain range after a gradual and winding ascent of approximately 2 kilometers from the southern side. There is very little slope along the northern approach.

During the Second Boer War, the pass was one of several around Pretoria that was attacked by Boer forces under Koos de la Rey in July 1900.
