= Winterveld =

Township in Gauteng, South Africa

Winterveld Winterveldt
- Location within Gauteng Location within South Africa
- Coordinates: 25.420°S 27.949°E
- Country: South Africa
- Province: Gauteng
- Municipality: City of Tshwane

Area
  - Total: 104.52 km^{2} (40.36 sq mi)

Population (2011)
  - Total: 120,826
  - Density: 1,156.0/km^{2} (2,994.0/sq mi)

Racial makeup (2011)
  - Black African: 99.5%
  - Coloured: 0.2%
  - Indian/Asian: 0.1%
  - White: 0.1%
  - Other: 0.2%

First languages (2011)
  - Tsonga: 21.9%
  - Tswana: 19.9%
  - Zulu: 19.1%
  - Northern Sotho: 11.5%
  - Other: 27.6%
- Time zone: UTC+2 (SAST)
- Postal code: 0198
- PO box: 0198
- Area code: 012

Winterveld (also spelled Winterveldt) is a large township in the City of Tshwane Metropolitan Municipality, Gauteng, South Africa. It lies at the north-western corner of Tshwane adjacent to the townships of Mabopane and Soshanguve. The community covers about 104.5 km² and had a population of 120,826 according to the 2011 census, making it one of the larger townships in northern Gauteng. The area is approximately 40 km north-northwest of Pretoria by road. Winterveld is located on the Highveld plateau at the boundary with the Bushveld grassland and lies on ancient Bushveld granite; the locality is normally classified as having a hot semi-arid (Köppen BSh) climate.

== History ==
The name Winterveld comes from Afrikaans meaning "winter field", a reference to the area's use as grazing ground in the cooler, dry months. The locality was originally farmland prior to large-scale settlement. Under apartheid-era spatial policies the area and surrounds were linked administratively to the Bophuthatswana homeland and from the 1960s and 1970s Winterveld expanded as a site for relocated black South Africans; between circa 1968 and 1975 the area received many displaced rural and urban migrants and developed large informal/squatter settlements. After the end of apartheid Winterveld was incorporated into the City of Tshwane metropolitan municipality (c. 2000–2001) and since then has been the focus of phased state investment in housing, electrification, schools and other municipal infrastructure.

== Geography and location ==
Winterveld sits on the Highveld plateau in northern Gauteng (approx. 25°25′S 28°01′E) and is about 40 km by road north-northwest of central Pretoria. The terrain is generally flat to gently rolling; the area drains towards tributaries of the Elands River and is near several regional natural landmarks (for example, the Tswaing meteorite crater/nature reserve lies to the north of the broader Soshanguve/Mabopane area). The climate features hot, wet summers (most rain falls in summer months) and cool, dry winters; long-term averages are consistent with a hot semi-arid to warm temperate Highveld regime.

== Demographics ==
According to the 2011 national census, Winterveld had 120,826 residents living in an area of approximately 104.52 km². The population was overwhelmingly Black African (about 99.5%); Coloured, Indian/Asian and White groups each comprised well under 1% of inhabitants. First languages recorded in 2011 were led by Tsonga (21.9%), Setswana (19.9%), isiZulu (19.1%), Northern Sotho (11.5%) and a mix of other languages (27.6%). The community is comparatively young, with a high share of children and adolescents typical of many South African townships.

== Economy ==
Winterveld's local economy is largely informal and closely linked to Pretoria’s wider urban economy. There are few large industries within the township; most economic activity is small-scale and service-oriented: spaza/ corner shops, informal food traders, small mechanical and panel-beating workshops, hairdressers, and other micro-enterprises. A sizable portion of economically active residents commute to Pretoria and other nearby employment centres; formal job opportunities within Winterveld are limited and unemployment rates are high (estimates vary between studies). Provincial and national development initiatives have sought to stimulate local entrepreneurship and formalise informal trades—for example, the Township Automotive/Enterprise Hub initiative provides training, equipment and workspace to small motor-repair businesses in Winterveld to help formalise and grow the sector.

== Infrastructure ==
Since incorporation into the City of Tshwane, municipal investment extended services into much of Winterveld, but provision remains uneven and many challenges persist in informal sections. Electrification programmes in the region have been extensive since the 2000s, though not all dwellings had formal electricity connections at the time of earlier studies; water provision ranges from piped household supplies to communal standpipes in some zones, and sanitation in informal areas often relies on pit latrines. A number of government housing projects have delivered brick houses (RDP housing) across the township, while elsewhere older informal dwellings and room-rental stock remain common.

== Education ==
Winterveld contains several public primary and secondary schools that serve local communities; schooling infrastructure has been a target for post-2000 municipal and provincial investment although resource and capacity constraints remain. Students seeking tertiary education ordinarily travel to institutions in central Pretoria and broader Tshwane.

== Health and social services ==
Primary healthcare is supplied through public clinics in the area and supplemented by low-cost private providers. In February 2015 a new low-cost private clinic run under the Unjani Clinics social-franchise model opened in Winterveld's Ward 9 to provide primary care and family-planning services, offering an alternative to crowded public clinics in the area. The Unjani network and local Unjani clinic listings provide contact details for these services. Non-governmental organisations — notable among them the Bokamoso Youth Foundation / Bokamoso Life Centre — operate in Winterveld providing youth programmes, life-skills training and scholarship support.

== Politics and administration ==
Winterveld is administered by the City of Tshwane Metropolitan Municipality and falls within one of its municipal wards (ward boundaries have changed over time; recent elections have placed Winterveld within wards used by Tshwane for local representation). Politically the area has been an ANC stronghold in many municipal contests; for example, a by-election in 2018 saw the ANC win the Winterveld ward seat. For provincial and national representation Winterveld forms part of the broader Tshwane electoral region.

== Notable people ==
- Stevens Mokgalapa — former Mayor of Tshwane.
