= Nuwe Eersterus =

New Eersterust
- Location within Gauteng Location within South Africa
- Coordinates: 25°24′39″S 28°8′0″E
- Country: South Africa
- Province: Gauteng
- Municipality: City of Tshwane

Area
  - Total: 23.64 km^{2} (9.13 sq mi)

Population (2011)
  - Total: 35,059
  - Density: 1,483/km^{2} (3,841/sq mi)

Racial makeup (2011)
  - Black African: 99.2%
  - Coloured: 0.2%
  - Indian/Asian: 0.2%
  - White: 0.1%
  - Other: 0.3%

First languages (2011)
  - Tswana: 27.6%
  - Northern Sotho: 22.3%
  - Tsonga: 21.5%
  - S. Ndebele: 10.4%
  - Other: 18.2%
- Time zone: UTC+2 (SAST)

New Eersterust (Nuwe Eersterus) is a township in northwestern Gauteng province, South Africa, about 35 km North West of Pretoria. It is bordered to the south-west by Soshanguve and to the east by Hammanskraal. The township is commonly known as "Resi/Eersterus".

== History ==
It was incorporated into the Gauteng province in 2004 under the jurisdiction of the City of Tshwane Metropolitan Municipality. This township is situated near the boundary with the North West Province.

== Education ==
The township of New Eersterust has 7 schools being Rakgotso High School, Ramabele High School, New Eersterust High School, Matso Primary School, Kgomba Primary School, Rapelego Primary School and Redirile Primary School. The most widely spoken languages are Tswana, Northern Sotho, Tsonga and Ndebele.

== Subdivisions ==
The township is divided in Blocks A, B, C, D1, D2, E, F1, F2, F3, F4 and Soutpan and Marikana informal settlement. The Tswaing Crater Museum is also located in New Eersterust.
