= De Wildt =

- Location within North West (South African province) Location within South Africa
- Coordinates: 25°37′30″S 27°56′49″E
- Country: South Africa
- Province: North West
- District: Bojanala
- Municipality: Madibeng

Area
  - Total: 0.98 km^{2} (0.38 sq mi)

Population (2011)
  - Total: 3,492
  - Density: 3,600/km^{2} (9,200/sq mi)
- Time zone: UTC+2 (SAST)
- PO box: 0251
- Area code: 012

De Wildt is a town with a railway station, police station and post office in North West province of South Africa, 40 km west-north-west of Pretoria.

== History ==
It was named after the Dutch engineer Mauritz Edgar de Wildt (1855–1907), who in 1905 surveyed the railway-line between Pretoria and Rustenburg. The town is famous for a speech delivered on 7 December 1912 by General J. B. M. Hertzog which ultimately led to the establishment of the National Party.

== Parks and greenspace ==
Nearby is the Ann van Dyk Cheetah Centre also known as the De Wildt Cheetah and Wildlife Centre. Formed in 1971, the centre breeds cheetah and wild dogs.
