= R566 (South Africa) =

Regional route in South Africa

Regional route R566

Route information
- Length: 50.8 km (31.6 mi)

Major junctions
- West end: R104 near Arbourfell
- R512 near Brits; R511 near Brits; R80 near Rosslyn; N4 near Onderstepoort
- East end: R101 Lavender Road, Annlin, Pretoria

Location
- Country: South Africa

Highway system
- Numbered routes of South Africa
← R565	→ R567

The R566 is a Regional Route in South Africa that connects Brits with Pretoria North via Ga-Rankuwa and Rosslyn.

It is an alternative route to the N4 highway for travel between Brits and Pretoria North.

== Route ==
Its western terminus is a junction with the R104 route about 10 kilometres east of Modderspruit (5.5 kilometres west of The Elephant Sanctuary Hartbeespoort Dam) in the Madibeng Local Municipality of the North West Province. It begins by heading north-east for 7 kilometres, flying over the N4 highway (Platinum Highway), to reach a junction with the R512 route about 5 kilometres south of the Brits town centre, where it turns to the east. It proceeds east-north-east for 3.6 kilometres, crossing the Crocodile River, to reach a junction with the R511 route south-east of the town centre.

From the R511 junction near Brits, the R566 continues eastwards. Just after the village of Mmakau (at De Wildt), the R566 leaves the North West Province and enters the City of Tshwane Metropolitan Municipality in Gauteng Province as Rosslyn Road. It first passes south of Ga-Rankuwa before passing through the industrial area of Rosslyn (part of Akasia), where it meets the R80 Mabopane Highway.

From the R80 interchange, the R566 heads south-east, bypassing the Onderstepoort Private Nature Reserve, to cross back to the southern side of the N4 highway (Platinum Highway; Pretoria Northern Bypass) and pass just north of the Pretoria North suburb. It meets the northern terminus of the M1 route (Paul Kruger Street; which connects to Pretoria North and the Pretoria CBD) before ending at an intersection with the R101 route at Annlin, just south of the Wonderboom Airport entrance.
