= Numbered routes in South Africa =

National, provincial and regional roads

In South Africa some roads are designated as numbered routes to help with navigation. There is a nationwide numbering scheme consisting of national, provincial and regional routes, and within various urban areas there are schemes of metropolitan route numbering.

Road Signs in South Africa

== Numbering ==
In the nationwide numbering scheme, routes are divided into a hierarchy of three categories: national routes, which are the most important routes connecting major cities; provincial routes, which connecting smaller cities and towns to the national route network; and regional routes, which connect smaller towns to the route network. Route numbers are allocated to these classes as follows:

- National routes - N1 to N21
- Provincial routes - R21 to R99
- Regional parallel routes - R101 to R120 (A Regional parallel route will consist of road segments formerly part of the national route R1xy. Nxy that have been replaced by upgraded roads)
- Regional routes in the former Cape Province: R300 to R499.
- Regional routes in the former Transvaal Province: R500 to R599
- Regional routes in KwaZulu-Natal: R600 to R699
- Regional routes in the Free State: R700 to R799

These numbers are allocated by the Route Numbering and Road Traffic Signs Sub Committee within the Roads Co-ordinating Body, an organisation which contains representatives from road authorities in national, provincial and local government

=== Metropolitan routes ===
In metropolitan numbering schemes the local authority can designate routes consisting of M followed by any number, but it should not use numbers the same as those used by national, provincial or regional routes in the same area. This rule is not universally followed, for example in Johannesburg where there is both an N1 and an M1 and in Bloemfontein where there is both an R30 and an M30.

The Pietermaritzburg-Hilton area and Krugersdorp are the only urban areas that do not form part of a metropolitan municipality but still have metropolitan routes. The following metropolitan municipalities and their cities have metropolitan numbering schemes.

- List of metropolitan routes in South Africa
- Buffalo City (East London)
  - Metropolitan routes in East London
- City of Cape Town (Cape Town)
  - Metropolitan routes in Cape Town
- City of Johannesburg & Ekurhuleni (Johannesburg) & Krugersdorp (West Rand)
  - Metropolitan routes in Johannesburg
- City of Tshwane (Pretoria)
  - Metropolitan routes in Pretoria
- Ethekwini (Durban)
  - Metropolitan routes in Durban
- Mangaung (Bloemfontein)
  - Metropolitan routes in Bloemfontein
- Nelson Mandela Bay (Port Elizabeth)
  - Metropolitan routes in Port Elizabeth
- Pietermaritzburg-Hilton area (Umgungundlovu)
  - Metropolitan routes in Pietermaritzburg

== Lists of routes ==
- List of national routes in South Africa
- List of provincial routes in South Africa
- List of regional routes in South Africa
- List of metropolitan routes in South Africa
  - Metropolitan routes in East London
  - Metropolitan routes in Cape Town
  - Metropolitan routes in Johannesburg
  - Metropolitan routes in Pretoria
  - Metropolitan routes in Durban
  - Metropolitan routes in Bloemfontein
  - Metropolitan routes in Port Elizabeth
  - Metropolitan routes in Pietermaritzburg
- Ring roads in South Africa
