= Mabopane =

- Location within Gauteng Location within South Africa Location within Africa
- Coordinates: 25°30′0″S 28°4′48″E
- Country: South Africa
- Province: Gauteng
- Municipality: City of Tshwane
- Established: 1972

Area
  - Total: 42.20 km^{2} (16.29 sq mi)

Population (2011)
  - Total: 110,972
  - Density: 2,630/km^{2} (6,811/sq mi)

Racial makeup (2011)
  - Black African: 99.2%
  - Coloured: 0.4%
  - Indian/Asian: 0.1%
  - White: 0.1%
  - Other: 0.2%

First languages (2011)
  - Tswana: 58.8%
  - Northern Sotho: 9.9%
  - Tsonga: 8.5%
  - Zulu: 5.6%
  - Other: 17.2%
- Time zone: UTC+2 (SAST)
- Postal code (street): 0190
- PO box: 0190
- Area code: 012

Mabopane is a large residential township located about 22 km north-west of Pretoria, within the City of Tshwane Metropolitan Municipality in Gauteng, South Africa. The 2011 census counted roughly 110,972 residents, predominantly Setswana speakers.

== Overview ==
Mabopane developed as one of the major Black townships north of Pretoria under apartheid spatial planning. It is closely linked physically and historically with neighbouring Soshanguve and the Rosslyn industrial area, and it contains local landmarks including the Mabopane (Soshanguve) railway precinct and the Odi Stadium. Since the early 2000s Mabopane has been administered by the City of Tshwane and has seen housing projects, commercial development and ongoing infrastructure challenges.

== History ==
=== Proclamation ===
Mabopane was proclaimed in 1959 as a black-only residential settlement by the then Transvaal administration. Initial residents included people displaced from Wallmansthal, Lady Selborne and surrounding farms. Early housing blocks were constructed beginning with Block A; other blocks followed and areas were planned according to socio-economic status.

=== Bophuthatswana ===
Mabopane was incorporated into the bantustan of Bophuthatswana from 1977 to 1994. Parts of Mabopane (Blocks F, G and H) later became Soshanguve to house non-Tswana residents during bantustan rule. During that period the area saw public works such as training centres and hospitals; many of these facilities experienced decline after 1994.

=== Post-Apartheid ===
From the 1990s onwards Mabopane experienced administrative change and gradual infrastructure repairs, but challenges in housing, roads and services persist.

== Geography ==
The township is in the Highveld region and has a temperate, summer-rainfall climate.

== Demographics ==
Most residents identify as Christian; Bantu languages predominate, with Tswana the largest first language group according to the 2011 census.

== Local government ==
Mabopane is within the City of Tshwane municipality in Gauteng. Local services are delivered by municipal departments and parastatals such as water utilities and Eskom. (Local representative names change frequently and should be sourced from current municipal records.)

== Education ==
The township has several primary and secondary schools. The local further-education campus is the Odi Campus of Tshwane South TVET College (formerly known locally as "MANPOWER").

== See also ==
- Winterveld
- Soshanguve
- Ga-Rankuwa
- Atteridgeville
- Pretoria
- Bophuthatswana
