= Soshanguve =

- Location within Gauteng Location within South Africa Location within Africa
- Coordinates: 25°31′25″S 28°6′0″E
- Country: South Africa
- Province: Gauteng
- Municipality: City of Tshwane

Area
  - Total: 126.77 km^{2} (48.95 sq mi)

Population (2011)
  - Total: 403,162
  - Density: 3,180.3/km^{2} (8,236.8/sq mi)

Racial makeup (2011)
  - Black African: 99.2%
  - Coloured: 0.3%
  - Indian/Asian: 0.1%
  - White: 0.1%
  - Other: 0.4%

First languages (2011)
  - Northern Sotho: 28.2%
  - Tswana: 16.7%
  - Tsonga: 15.1%
  - Zulu: 13.6%
  - Other: 26.5%
- Time zone: UTC+2 (SAST)
- Postal code (street): 0152
- PO box: 0164
- Area code: 012

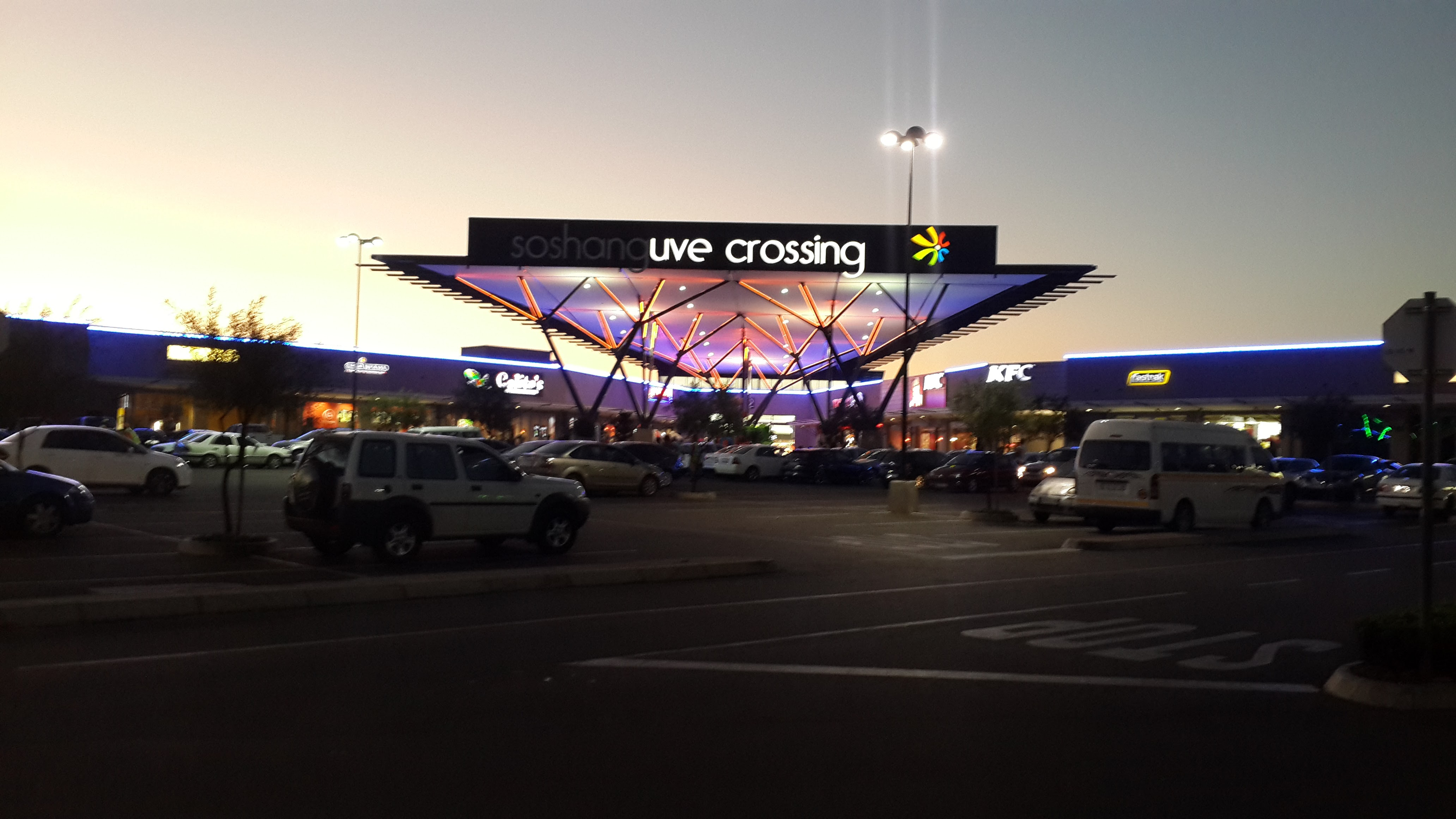
Soshanguve Crossing Mall

Soshanguve is a township situated about 30 km north of Pretoria and just east of Mabopane, in Gauteng, South Africa. The name Soshanguve is an acronym for Sotho, Shangaan, Nguni and Venda, thus showing the multi-ethnic composition of the population. The major African languages of South Africa are heard in Soshanguve.

== History ==
It was formerly known as Mabopane East. The acronym divided the Soshanguve residents according to their tribe when they were resettled from Mamelodi and Atteridgeville in 1974.

== Culture ==
The people of Soshanguve speak Pretoria Sotho called Se Pitori and listen to local music genre called Barcadi

== Educational institutions ==
Soshanguve is home to Tshwane University of Technology's Soshanguve North & South Campuses & Tshwane North College (TNC).

== Places of interest ==
- The second fab lab in South Africa is located in Soshanguve Block TT where it is operated by a self-organized group of unemployed youth known as the Bright Youth Council.
- Tswaing Crater - Tswaing, meaning Place of Salt in Setswana, is a 2000-hectare heritage site.
- Giant Stadium, situated on the edge of the Soshanguve eastern border, is widely regarded as central venue for major music events and locally organized activities.
- Soshanguve Crossing Mall
- Soshanguve mall
- Soshanguve Railway Station

== Notable people ==
- Black Motion
- DJ Maphorisa
- Warren Masemola
- Vusi Mahlasela
- Lucky Lekgwathi
- Tsakani Maluleke, chartered accountant, Auditor-General of South Africa (2020–present)
