= R573 (South Africa) =

Regional route in South Africa

Regional route R573

Route information
- Maintained by SANRAL
- Length: 138 km (86 mi)

Major junctions
- Southwest end: R513 at Pretoria
- R568 at KwaMhlanga; R544 near Kwaggafontein; R568 at Siyabuswa
- Northeast end: N11 / R33 at Marble Hall

Location
- Country: South Africa
- Major cities: Pretoria, KwaMhlanga, Kwaggafontein, Siyabuswa, Marble Hall

Highway system
- Numbered routes of South Africa
← R572	→ R575

The R573 is a Regional Route in South Africa that connects Pretoria with Marble Hall via KwaMhlanga and Siyabuswa. As the road passes through Moloto (at the Gauteng-Mpumalanga border), the entire route is known as the Moloto Road. It is maintained by the South African National Roads Agency.

== Route ==
Its south-western terminus is a junction with the R513 road just north-east of Pretoria, Gauteng (east of Montana Park). It heads north-east for 48 kilometres, through Kameeldrift, bypassing the Roodeplaat Dam and Roodeplaat Nature Reserve, to enter Mpumalanga at the town of Moloto and proceed to the town of KwaMhlanga, where it meets the R568 road.

It continues east-north-east for 26 kilometres to the town of Kwaggafontein. Just before Kwaggafontein, it meets the northern terminus of the R544 road. From Kwaggafontein, the R573 continues north-east to bypass Mathys Zyn Loop and Boekenhouthoek before crossing into Limpopo at the town of Witfontein. Soon after, the R573 meets the R568 again and temporarily crosses back into Mpumalanga, entering the town of Siyabuswa. The distance from Kwaggafontein to Siyabuswa is 24 kilometres.

Just after Siyabuswa, the R573 crosses back into Limpopo and continues north-east for 30 kilometres to end at a junction with the R33 and N11 national route in Marble Hall, just south of the town centre.

== State of Road ==
The R573 Moloto Road Corridor has been declared as a dangerous road. About 60,000 commuters use this route on a daily basis and it is notorious for claiming lives in accidents.

In July 2015, the Limpopo and Mpumalanga road departments handed over their parts of the road to the South African National Roads Agency (SANRAL). In June 2020, the Gauteng Department of Roads and Transport officially handed over its portion to SANRAL, meaning that the entire route from Pretoria to Marble Hall is now the responsibility of SANRAL. SANRAL started the upgrade of the route in 2016 and is expected to finish the Moloto Road Upgrade Project in 2025.

The upgrades include changing certain intersections into roundabouts as well as turning the route into a dual carriageway. There are also considerations to add a railway following this route.

However, protests over the upgrade and maintenance of this route were still occurring as of September 2020. The group of protesters were protesting at the Union Buildings in Pretoria, claiming that the Moloto Development Corridor (road and rail) is incomplete and that the Finance Minister and Treasury should quickly make the money available for the development corridor. The group of protesters demanded that the railway should be built.
