= R513 (South Africa) =

Regional route in South Africa

Regional route R513

Route information
- Length: 103 km (64 mi)

Major junctions
- West end: R511 north of Hartbeespoort
- R80 at Akasia; R101 at Pretoria North; N1 / N4 at Montana Park, Pretoria; R573 near Kameeldrift, Pretoria; R515 at Cullinan; R568 at Ekangala
- East end: R104 at Bronkhorstspruit

Location
- Country: South Africa
- Major cities: Hartbeespoort, Pretoria, Cullinan, Ekangala, Bronkhorstspruit

Highway system
- Numbered routes of South Africa
← R512	→ R514

The R513 is a Regional Route in South Africa that connects Hartbeespoort with Bronkhorstspruit via Akasia, Pretoria North and Cullinan.

== Route ==
Its western origin is a junction with the R511 approximately 5 km north of Hartbeespoort (12 km south-east of Brits) in the North West. From there, it heads east, crossing the border into Gauteng and entering the north-western part of the city of Pretoria in the City of Tshwane Metropolitan Municipality.

It meets with Pretoria's M17 metropolitan route (Horns Nek) at a staggered junction (cosigned for 400 metres northwards) before continuing eastwards through the suburbs of Akasia (as Brits Road; where it meets the R80 Mabopane Highway) and Pretoria North (as Rachel de Beer Street).

Just after Pretoria North, at the suburb of Annlin West, It becomes co-signed with Pretoria's M1 metropolitan route (Paul Kruger Street) southwards for 800 metres and the R101 (Lavender Road) north-east for 2 kilometers before becoming its own road eastwards (Sefako Makgatho Drive; formerly Zambesi Drive). It runs through the Wonderboom, Sinoville, Magalieskruin and Montana Park suburbs before forming an interchange with the N1/N4 Toll Highway (Pretoria Bypass) and exiting the city.

Just east of the N1 highway interchange (south-west of Kameeldrift), the R513 meets the south-western terminus of the R573 (Moloto Road) from KwaMhlanga and Marble Hall. Continuing east, the R513 passes south of the Roodeplaat Dam and its Nature Reserve, passes north of the township of Mamelodi and then bypasses the Cullinan Diamond Mine to reach the town of Cullinan, where it meets the northern terminus of the R515 at a staggered junction before continuing eastwards.

At Ekangala, the road meets the R568 road at a t-junction. It is co-signed with the R568 southwards for 2.5 kilometers before becoming its own road to the south-east. It heads for another 13 km, bypassing Zithobeni, to end at a junction with the R104 in Bronkhorstspruit, just east of the town centre and just west of the R104's intersection with the R25.
