= Loopspruit =

- Location within Mpumalanga Location within South Africa
- Coordinates: 25.555°S 28.725°E
- Country: South Africa
- Province: Mpumalanga
- District: Nkangala
- Municipality: Thembisile Hani
- Time zone: UTC+2 (SAST)

Loopspruit is a small town situated 55 km north east of Pretoria in Mpumalanga, South Africa.

Located on the R568 road towards KwaMhlanga, the village is renowned for Loopspruit Wine Estate, which owes its origins to a retired policeman, Eric Olivier. Loopspruit Wine Estate is the most northerly wine estate in South Africa, on the banks of the Loopspruit River. The town also hosts Kgodwana, a traditional Ndebele village.
