= Milena Hübschmannová =

Czech linguist and Romani scholar

- Born: 10 June 1933; Prague, Czechoslovakia
- Died: 8 September 2005 (aged 72); Kameeldrift, Gauteng Province, South Africa
- Occupation: academic
- Known for: Developing studies on the Roma people, their language, and culture and founding the first undergraduate degree program in Romani Studies.

Milena Hübschmannová (10 June 1933 – 8 September 2005) was a Czech professor of Romani studies at Charles University of Prague. She was one of the leading experts on Romani society and culture, as well as Romani language. She founded the academic study program on the Roma at Charles University and actively opposed their assimilation into the greater culture. She wrote a Romani-Czech and Czech-Romani dictionary and collected many of the stories of the Roma, translating them for posterity. The program she founded was the first program worldwide to offer a degree program to undergraduates in Romani Studies.

== Early life ==
Milena Hübschmannová was born on 10 July 1933 in Prague, Czechoslovakia. In her childhood, her parents were imprisoned by the Gestapo, during World War II. She attended the "H. Fasta" English Gymnasium, graduating in 1951 and went on to pursue the study of language at the Charles University. From childhood, she had been interested in the culture of India and took Hindi classes during her high school years at the Oriental Institute of the Czechoslovak Academy of Sciences. When she entered the university Philology Department, Hübschmannová focused on Indic languages, studying Bengali, Hindi, and Urdu. In 1953, when the communist government sent her to participate in a working brigade in Ostrava in the Moravian-Silesian Region of the Republic, Hübschmannová encountered the Roma communities for the first time. She was surprised that she understood their language and recognized that it must have Indic roots. Unable to travel to India, because of restrictions placed by the communist regime, Hübschmannová changed her focus to the study of the Romani language. At that time, there was a strong push to force the Roma in heavily Czech areas to assimilate into the majority culture, forcing many communities to flee the region, going to Slovakia. There was very little understanding of their ethnicity, language, culture or traditions. Hübschmannová worked among the Roma for nearly a year learning as much as she could, before returning to Prague and graduating from Charles University in 1956.

== Career ==
That same year, Hübschmannová began working at Czech Radio as a dramatic and literary editor, which allowed her to take field trips and record the folklore, fairy tales and folksongs of the Roma communities. Armed with a heavy, outdated tape recorder, which she kept in a bag slung over her shoulder, Hübschmannová wandered the countryside and recorded an extremely large collection of material, accumulating over 500 tapes. She continued her work on India, translating several important poets, including Mirza Ghalib and in 1959, Hübschmannová took her first research trip to India. During this period, she married the radio director, Josef Melč. Returning to Prague, she translated Indian poets for almost a decade and gave birth to her daughter Tereza in 1963. In 1967 she worked at the Oriental Institute beginning the preparatory work on a study of the Romani people, which was possible because of the loosening during the Prague Spring. She helped found the Union of Gypsies-Roma during the period and edited a Romani-language journal. Through the Union, Hübschmannová helped to revive early school education using the Romani language as the primary language until students gained competency in Czech. But by August, 1968, events had changed and their work was brought to a halt, leading Hübschmannová to take work in a nursery school near the town of Rakúsy in a Romani settlement. She returned to India to study in 1969.

Upon her return to Czechoslovakia, Hübschmannová worked at the Czechoslovak Academy of Sciences in the Department of Philosophy and Sociology until 1974. She continued her analysis and gathering of information at the Academy, working with a multi-disciplinary team to develop not just the ethnographic and linguistic study of the Roma, but to include the demographic, historic and sociological profiles of the community. As a linguist, Hübschmannová was concerned that the language of the Roma was being lost, as the communities were forced to speak Czech, Hungarian, or Slovak in their interactions of daily living, though continued use of Romani language dialects prevailed when speaking with other Roma. The works that were published by the group included the first literature in the Romani language ever published in Czechoslovakia. In 1973, another government crackdown forced the Union to disband and suspend publication of their journal; however, some of the writers, having been inspired to have their Romani cultural record published, continued to publish in other venues. Between 1974 and 1975, Hübschmannová worked at Charles University in the Pedagogical Faculty, but her opposition to the government assimilation policies toward the Roma led to her dismissal. She had no permanent employment between 1976 and 1982, working on an as-needed basis for the Prague School of Languages teaching Hindi and Romani. The school hired her on a permanent basis in 1982 and she remained with them until 1991. At the time, the classes Hübschmannová taught on Romani language were the only formal coursework being offered to the Roma in their native tongue. The courses were also attended by non-Roma social workers to facilitate their communication with the Roma in the course of their work. In 1989, with the Velvet Revolution and the fall of communism, Roma culture was again allowed to flourish and Hübschmannová was both an advocate for preserving Romani heritage and an encouraging voice to the Roma communities.

In 1991, Hübschmannová returned to Charles University and founded the Romani Studies Program as part of the Indological Institute. It was the first time that the field had garnered academic attention in Prague and the first program in the world to offer an undergraduate degree on the Roma. Hübschmannová chaired the department until her death and also taught Urdu between 1991 and 1997. Returning to the work that had been suspended in 1968, Hübschmannová published the first Romani-Czech/Czech-Romani Pocket Dictionary, with Hana Šebková and Anna Žigová in 1991. The dictionary, Romsko-český, česko-romský kapesní slovník, was critically well-received as a standard work and was praised for its integration of standard phrases and terms across various Romani communities, including Czech, Hungarian, and Slovak dialects. Other important works from the early 1970s found new printings, such as Šaj pes dovakeras: Můžeme se domluvit (We can communicate) published by Palacký University, Olomouc in 1993 and 1995; Základy romštiny (Romani Basics) and Romské pohádky (Romani Fairy Tales), which were locally printed in 1973 and 1974, but republished by Fortuna in 1999. Hübschmannová founded the journal Romano Džaniben (Romani Studies) in 1994, which became an important international publication of Romani scholarship.

Hübschmannová worked with Petr Uhl, the acting Commissioner for Human Rights, to develop a process for individual members of the Roma communities to seek justice. She also worked with museums in Brno and Vienna to establish archives for Romani materials. In 1995, Hübschmannová completed her doctoral work and was awarded the degree candidarus scientarum with her thesis of Romistické studie I (Romani Studies 1). Beginning in 1996, she worked with a consortium of linguists at the Centre des Études Tsiganes of the Paris Descartes University and the State Pedagogical Institute in Bratislava to develop curricula and train teachers to be able to teach Romani language and cultural studies. Hübschmannová received two cultural awards from the Roma Civic Initiative in 1998 for her efforts at promoting education and cultural preservation programs for the Roma communities. Continuing her publishing efforts, Hübschmannová authored, co-authored or edited more than 90 publications, in addition to editing some 400 articles which were published in Romano Džaniben, for which she served as editor in chief.

In 1999, Hübschmannová published an important work called A false dawn: my life as a Gypsy woman in Slovakia. The book is the autobiography of Ilona Lacková covering the period from 1920 to 1970, which was told to Hübschmannová over an eight-year period in Romani. She then translated the story into Czech and later French and English. The book relates the story of how the Roma's true identities were hidden behind stereotypical imagery. At the same time, because it is told as a first person account, the narrative restores the storyteller's humanity. Addressing attempts by the government to "reeducate" the Roma, and force their assimilation, the book explores the ghettoization the Roma experienced under the socialist regime. The work became an important text, as it covered ground that scientists could not, by giving an insider's view of the issues facing the Romani community. It was subsequently published in Bulgarian, Hungarian and Spanish, winning the International Humanitarian Hidalgo Prize in 2001 from Spain. Hübschmannová earned her Habilitation degree with a thesis of Romistické studie II (Romani Studies 2) in 2000 and that same year was honored with a plaque at the Fifth International Congress of the International Romani Union, held in Prague. In 2002, Czech President Václav Havel awarded her the Medal of Merit in the third degree and the following year she was awarded the Medal of Merit in the first degree by the Ministry of Education, Youth, and Physical Training.

== Death and legacy ==
Hübschmannová died in a car accident on 8 September 2005 near the town of Kameeldrift, Gauteng Province, South Africa. The year after her death, the 7th International Conference on Romani Linguistics was dedicated to her memory. Her unexpected death was widely felt by the Romani community, who had lost an advocate as well as someone who had dedicated her career to preserving their cultural heritage. A book, entitled Milena Hübschmannová ve vzpomínkách (Milena Hübschmannová in Memorial) was published in 2007, giving biographical details of Hübschmannová's life and career. Romanis from around the world contributed to its creation, as did her siblings, friends and colleagues.
