= R568 (South Africa) =

Regional route in South Africa

Regional route R568

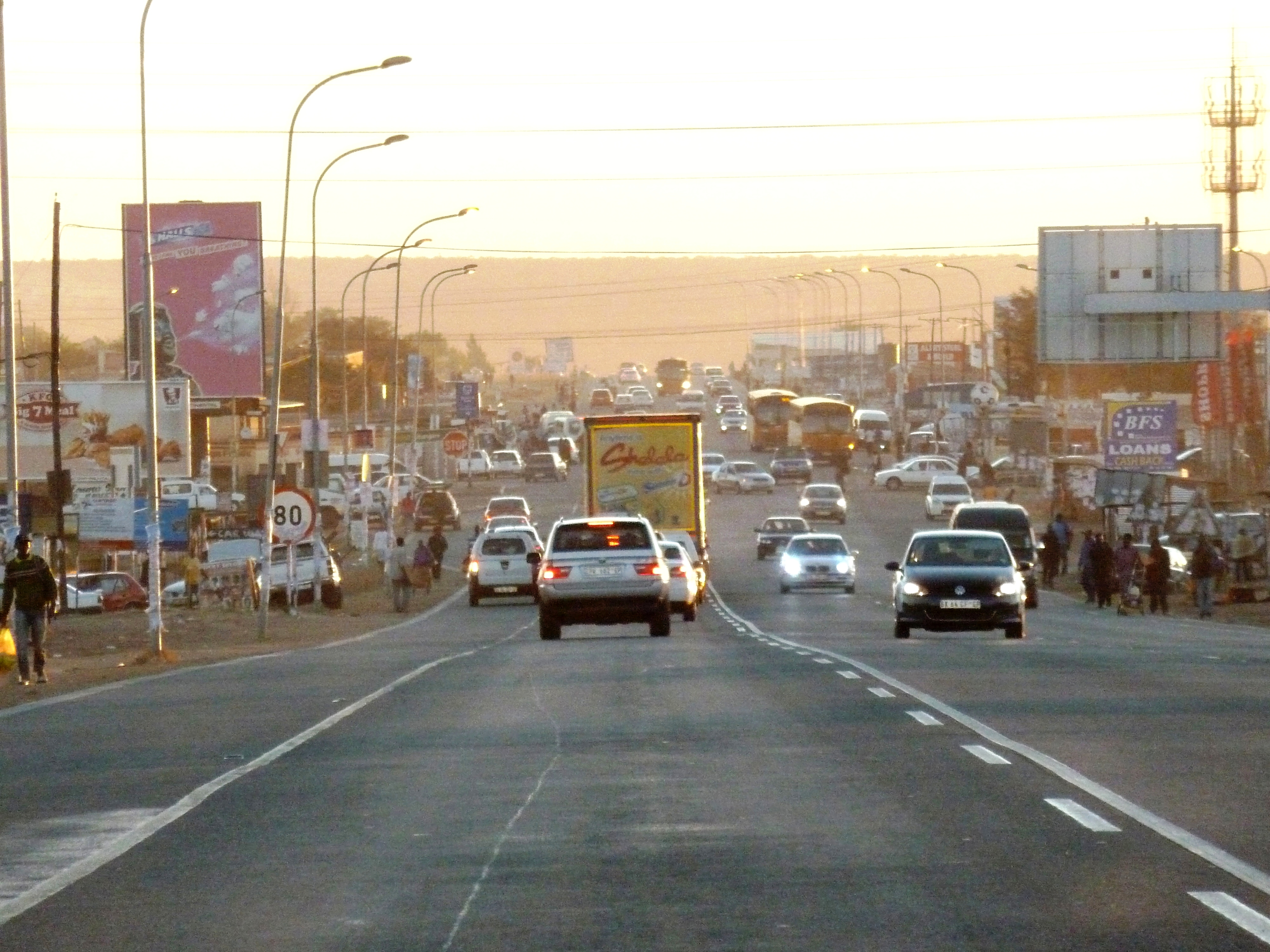
- R568 in KwaMhlanga, western Mpumalanga

Route information
- Length: 106 km (66 mi)

Major junctions
- North end: R573 at Siyabuswa
- R573 at KwaMhlanga; R513 at Ekangala; R104 at Bronkhorstspruit; N4 at Bronkhorstspruit
- South end: R25 near Bronkhorstspruit

Location
- Country: South Africa
- Major cities: Siyabuswa, KwaMhlanga, Ekangala, Bronkhorstspruit

Highway system
- Numbered routes of South Africa
| ← R567 | → R569 |

The R568 is a Regional Route in South Africa that connects Siyabuswa with Bronkhorstspruit via KwaMhlanga.

== Route ==
Its north-eastern terminus is an intersection with the R573 at Siyabuswa, Mpumalanga. It initially heads west, then south-west, again crossing the R573 at KwaMhlanga. It then heads south, passing through Loopspruit before crossing into Gauteng and passing through Ekangala. South of Ekangala, it co-signs with the R513 for 2.5 kilometres and then crosses the R104 and N4 highway (Maputo Corridor) just west of Bronkhorstspruit. It then ends at an intersection with the R25.
