= Klipfontein (disambiguation) =

Klipfontein may refer to:

- MS Klipfontein (1939), a Dutch ocean liner, WW II troop transport, sunk 1953

in South Africa

- Klipfontein, Western Cape
- Klipfontein, Mpumalanga, a town
- Klipfontein-A, a village on the R568 north of KwaMhlanga, Mpumalanga

== See also ==
- Farm Klipfontein, Johannesburg
