= Vaalbank =

- Location within Mpumalanga Location within South Africa
- Coordinates: 25°9′20″S 28°50′49″E
- Country: South Africa
- Province: Mpumalanga
- District: Nkangala
- Municipality: Dr JS Moroka

Area
  - Total: 4.04 km^{2} (1.56 sq mi)

Population (2011)
  - Total: 12,814
  - Density: 3,170/km^{2} (8,210/sq mi)

Racial makeup (2011)
  - Black African: 98.9%
  - Coloured: 0.2%
  - Indian/Asian: 0.6%
  - Other: 0.3%

First languages (2011)
  - Northern Sotho: 58.0%
  - S. Ndebele: 15.7%
  - Tsonga: 7.0%
  - Sotho: 6.2%
  - Other: 13.1%
- Time zone: UTC+2 (SAST)
- Postal code (street): 0449
- PO box: 1055
- Area code: 013

Vaalbank (also known as Libangeni) is a small town some 102 kilometers northeast of Pretoria. The town is an important one in Mpumalanga's northwestern end where the majority of the surrounding population is rural and does not have infrastructure. It overlooks the Mkhombo Dam (formerly called the Renosterkop Dam) which is of agricultural importance in the region.

It is situated in the Dr JS Moroka Municipality of the Nkangala District.

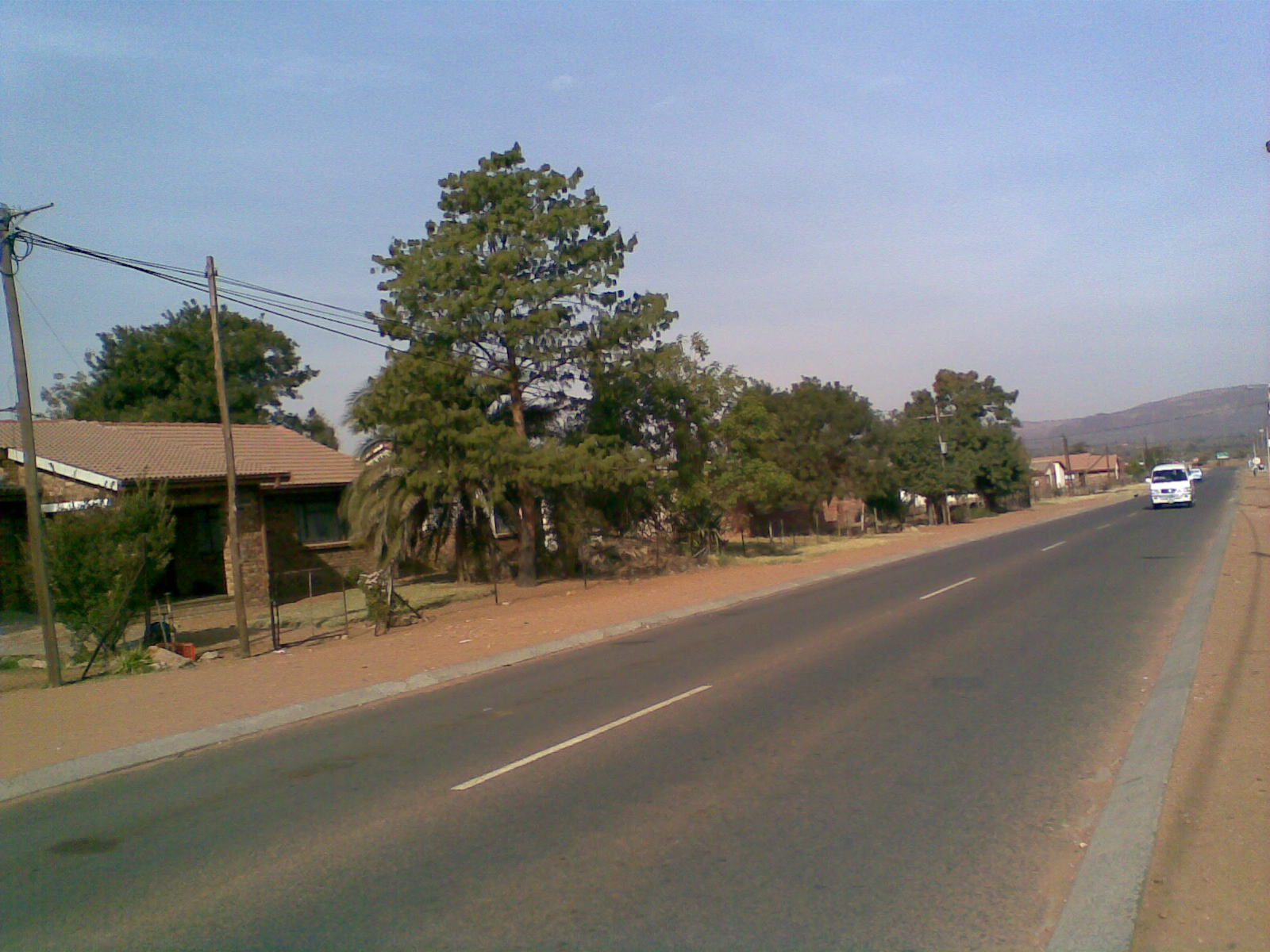
This street (informally called Main Street by locals) demonstrates a sharp divide between the town's societies.

The "Main Street" serves as a divide between the early Vaalbank that was set by the KwaNdebele government and the current multi-ethnic Vaalbank. The early Vaalbank was established to be an urban residential site for the Ndebele population. But with the demise of Apartheid, the town became multi-ethnic and services rendered were no longer of high quality. With this decline of quality services, the newer part of town became more of a shanty town with the exceptions of a few sections.

== Dermographics ==
The town has significant populations of Ndebele, Pedi, Tswana, Tsonga and Zulu people, whereas a minority of Venda, Indian and Chinese (primarily merchants) people are also found.

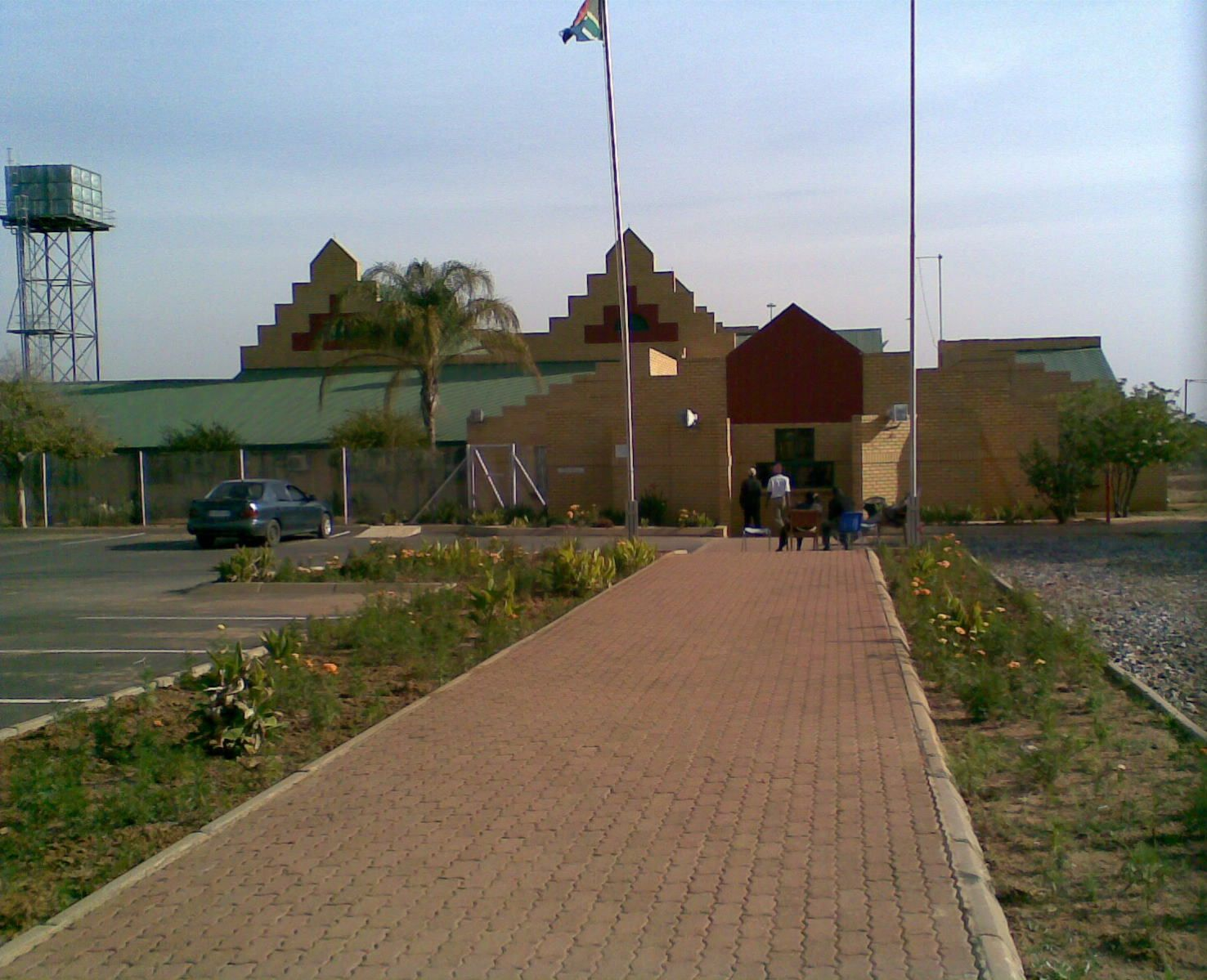
The Vaalbank Magistrate Court serves for the residents of the town and neighbouring villages.

== Origin of name ==
The name is of Afrikaans origin and means 'grey banks', most probably referring to the banks of the then Renosterkop Dam.

The Ndebele population has a name for the town: Libangeni, although this name is never used in speech.

== See also ==
- KwaMhlanga
- Siyabuswa
