= Southern Ndebele people =

Ethnic group native to South Africa

Ndebele people AmaNdebele
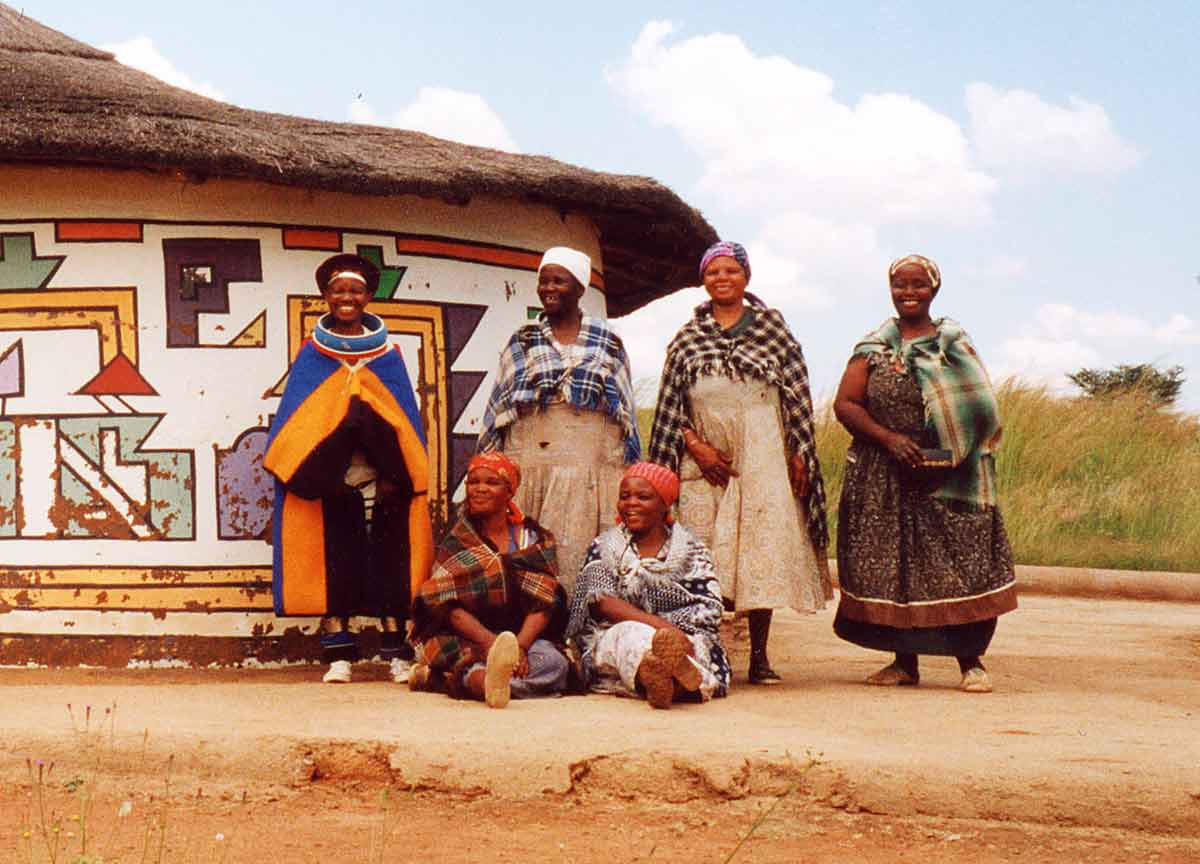
- The women of Loopspruit Cultural Village, near Bronkhorstspruit, in front of a traditionally-painted Ndebele dwelling.

Total population
- 2.1 million (2023 Census)

Regions with significant populations
- South Africa

Languages
- IsiNdebele, English, Afrikaans

Religion
- Christian, Animist

Related ethnic groups
- Other Nguni peoples (especially Northern Ndebele)

Ndebele
- Person: LiNdebele
- People: AmaNdebele
- Language: IsiNdebele
- Country: KwaNdebele

Southern Ndebele people, also known in English by their endonym AmaNdebele, are a Bantu ethnic group native to Southern Africa who speak the Southern Ndebele language (isiNdebele).

The group is separate from the Northern Ndebele who broke away from the Zulu during Shaka's time. The Southern Ndebele people mainly inhabit the South African provinces of Mpumalanga, Gauteng and Limpopo in the middle-northeast of the South Africa. In academia, this ethnic group is referred to as the Southern Ndebele to differentiate it from their relatives, the Northern Ndebele people, of the historical Matabeleland of Zimbabwe and the adjoining northernmost South African provinces of Limpopo and North West.

== Etymology ==
The term Ndebele, collectively as amaNdebele, is used among several South African groups, broadly divided into Northern and Southern. These groups are not genealogically related.

Several origins have been proposed for the ethnonym. One theory is that the Tswana speaking inhabitants referred to the Nguni newcomers as the leTebele/maTebele, derived from the term tebele, meaning “a stranger” or “one who plunders”, while the Nguni variant would be amaNdebele. The term was applied to any group regarded as outsiders, invaders, or refugees in a region.

An alternative theory relates -tebele to either the Tswana teba, “to sink down” or “crouch”, in reference to Zulu-style shield tactics, or thebe, meaning “shield", referring the shields that the Nguni were known for.

=== Prehistory ===
The history of the Ndebele people begin with the Bantu Migrations southwards from the Great Lakes region of East Africa. Bantu speaking peoples moved across the Limpopo river into modern day South Africa in the North Eastern regions of South Africa. At the time of the collapse of the Kingdom of Zimbabwe in 1450, Two main groups had emerged south of the Limpopo River: the Nguni, who occupied the eastern coastal plains, and the Sotho–Tswana, who lived on the interior plateau. Between the 1400s and early 1800s saw these two groups split into smaller distinct cultures and people. The Ndebele were just such a people.

=== Among the Hlubi ===
Chief Ndebele was living with his people in the territory of the Bhaca and Hlubi south of the Drakensberg Mountains which they called "uKhahlamba". The capital settlement in this territory was called eLundini. Chief Ndebele had broken away from the larger Mbo group and established his own rule over his own people who would take his name as the name of their nation.

Jonono, the great-grandson of Ndebele moved north with his people and settled in the area just north east of modern-day Ladysmith in the mountains surrounding the mouth of the Cwembe River. Jononoskop which is approximately 30 km (19 mi) north east of Ladysmith is said to be the burial place of Jonono.

Jonono was succeeded as "INgwenyama" which is the title of the King of the Ndebele, by his eldest son Nanasi who legend holds, was resistant to all poisons. One tale tells of how Nanasi feasted on the top of a nearby hill on poisonous fruit only to discover that he remained unharmed by the fruit. Today the alleged site is called "Butiswini" from ubuthi esiswini which roughly means 'a poisoned stomach'. Oral tradition does not tell us why Nanasi was eating poisonous fruit in the first place.

=== Migration to north of the Vaal river ===
Nanasi died without issue and so Mafana his brother succeeded him as Ngwenyama. Mafana is said to have lived in the mid-1500s. Mafana moved his people from their lands near Ladysmith moving in a north westward direction crossing first the Drakensberg Mountains and then made an attempt to cross the Vaal River. He was unsuccessful and drowned in the river along with a few others.

After the death of his father Mafana, Mhlanga assumed the throne and took his people over the Vaal River travelling in a north westward direction finally settling in an area around modern day Randfontein. Mhlanga established a new capital that was later called eMhlangeni (now known as Mehlakeng), which means Mhlanga's place, and there he stayed with the Ndebele until his death.

Musi, the son of Mhlanga succeeded his father as Ngwenyama of the Ndebele people. While at eMhlangeni, Musi found the area becoming increasingly hostile from the Sotho-Tswana tribes to the west that had not taken kindly to the Nguni Ndebele settling so close to their borders. Ultimately due the competing of resources, Musi uprooted the Ndebele once again and moved his people northwards crossing first the Jukskei River then the Hennops River. After discovering the source of the Apies River, Musi's Ndebele moved north along its banks through Wonderboompoort and settled in the hills north of Wonderboomkop on both side of the Apies River. Here Musi established two settlements. The first of which "KwaMnyamana" (The Place of Black Rocks) served as a new capitol for the Ndebele and was situated on the eastern side of the Apies river. The second settlement was that of "eMaruleni" (Named for the abundance of Marula fruit trees), which was situated on the western side of the Apies river.

Here at KwaMnyamana, Musi's Ndebele would establish a thriving homeland for themselves trading with BaKwena and BaKgatla tribes in the west.

Musi's people also encountered the indigenous nomadic San people living along the Apies River whom they called "AbaTshwa" which is said to mean "The People who we ignore".

=== Manala-Ndzundza conflict ===
Musi was a polygamist and as such fathered many children with many wives. The following are some of Musi's known progeny: Masombuka, also called Sikhosana whose name means "to begin". First born son of Musi's third wife. Ndzundza, also called Hlungwana was the first born son of his second wife. Manala, also called Mbuduma was the first born son of his 'Great Wife'. There was also Thombeni, also called Gheghana, Sibasa, Mrhwaduba, Mphafuli, Dlomu, and Tshwane, whose historicity is hotly debated with many suggesting he was not the son of Musi but the son of Musi's brother Sekhubatane or even Musi's grandson. There are others who even suggest that he may have never existed at all.

According to Ndebele tradition, it is custom for the first born son of the 'Great Wife' to succeed his father as ruler over the Ndebele people. The first born of Musi's great wife was Manala and is the rightful heir to the throne. Thus Manala was the rightful heir to the ruling seat of the Ndebele. This did not sit well with Musi's second wife, the mother of Ndzundza. Ndzundza`s mother was known as a woman who had an evil heart and would do anything to lie or kill anyone so that his son, Ndzundza, rules the Ndebele nation. And of which she did lie and that is why today amaNdebele are separated into 2 nations. Oral tradition on the many details of the following vary from community to community however what is mostly agreed upon is that when Musi was old, he was blind and quite senile. After the death of his great wife he was being nursed and cared for by his second wife. This second wife, sensing the passing of Musi was near, instructed Manala to go out and hunt an 'imbhuduma' (Wildebeest) to honour his father in his last days. While Manala was out, Musi's second wife came to him and presented her son Ndzundza as Manala and asked Musi to bestow to Ndzundza the "iNamrhali" which it is said, are magical beads or a magical staff that produce a sound that mimics the cries of a child. This mysterious gift was passed from incumbent rulers to their successors at their death to fortify their rule as the new ruler.

Alternate oral tradition holds that Musi himself sent Manala to hunt the imbuduma and knowingly bestowed iNamrhali to Ndzundza and instructed him to call an "Imbizo" (Royal counsel) and inform the elders and the people of what had transpired between him and his father. Ndzundza was further instructed to not leave KwaMnyamana at any cost. That if he should leave the seat of power, even having iNamrhali would not be enough to consolidate his power as the new ruler over the people and that his brother Manala would surely uses the forces of KwaMnyamana to seek retribution.

While it is debated how Ndzundza had obtained iNamrhali, the one consistent fact remained in almost all stories that Ndzundza was indeed in possession of iNamrhali at this point. Ndzundza did not head the warning of his father and fled eastwards with many followers including his brothers Mthombeni and Masombuka. Manala arrived with his hunt to find his father had died and Ndzundza with iNamrhali along with many followers had fled. Manala himself called an Imbizo declaring that Ndzundza had stolen iNamrhali and thus his birthright. He vowed to bring Ndzundza back to KwaMnyamana or kill him.

Manala with his army pursued Ndzundza and caught up with him at MaSongololo (Zonkolol) Between modern day Cullinan and Rayton. There they fought a battle between two branches of the Elands River. Ndzundza had narrowly claimed victory in this first battle and rather than staying in the area he fled with his forces further eastward. Manala pursued again and again lost to Ndzundza's forces in a battle at the Wilge River. It is said that at this battle, Ndzundza used iNamrhali to cast a magical spell over the river causing it to wash away some of Manala's forces. After this second defeat, Manala retreated back to KwaMnyamana to replenish their provisions and numbers. Manala and his army then continued to chase Ndzundza until they met at the Olifants River were a third battle ensued. Ndzundza allegedly cast the first blow, throwing a spear over the river towards Manala which landed at his feet.

Manala, a peaceful Prince, let his brother, Ndzundza, live and did not kill him. he allowed his brother to take half of the nation with him and he remained in KwaMnyamana to bury his beloved Father, Musi and was ordained by the Musi council as the new King of AmaNdebele.

King Manala had to initiate the young boys who were ready to undergo the Ndebele initiation school a year later after He was ordained the King of amaNdebele. King Manala initiated the young Ndebele boys for 3 months and gave them a regimental title (intanga) which was AmaDzibha. Ndzundza, who moved further north, heard that King Manala had was initiating young men and decided that he will also initiate young men the following year also. Ndzundza heard of the regimental title `AmaDzibha`, and he also gave his young men the same regimental title.

Ndzundza expected King Manala to initiate young boys again the following year after Ndzundza did, but King Manala as wise as He was, thought that the remaining uninitiated boys are still young. King Manala told the Ndebele nation that He will initiate young boys after every 4 years. It became a known thing that in the Ndebele kingdom, the initiation school will be undertaken every 4 years and Ndzundza did the same thing, but a year later that King Manala because Ndzundza is younger.

The regimental titles kept on becoming the same in King Manala`s nation and Ndzundza`s nation up until the 9th regimental title in the Manala nation. On the 10th regimental title, Ndzundza being influenced by his wife from the BaSotho, came up with his own regimental titles, where were, AmaDlaza (Matlasa), AmaPhogo (Mapogo), AmaSinya (Le Senya), AmaDugu (Dituku), AmaThula (Ra Thula), while King Manala named the young men according to what occurred during the period of their initiation e.g. AmaPhaswana MaQothantethe, iPhaswana is a bird that ate grasshoppers, so when King Manala said `MaQothantethe`, he referred to the bird eating the grasshoppers. King Manala remained with 13 regimental titles and Ndzundza remained with 15.

King Manala or rather the Manala lineage, gave refuge to a lot of surnames which are still under the Manala umbrella today, namely Masango, Sibanyoni, Masilela, Qongo, Mnguni, Magubelo, Thubana, Mgayo, Ngoma, Kokela, Mnyakeni, Mgidi, Ndala, Sibiya, Mathibela, Kghomu and many more, while Ndzundza took Mthimunye, Ntuli, Bongwe, Masombuka, Jiyana, Msiza, Bhuda, Mtshweni and many more.

This story bears great resemblance to the biblical story of Jacob and Esau which features in The Book of Genesis from Chapters 27 through to 33 telling of Esau's loss of his birthright to Jacob and the conflict that ensued between their descendants nations because of Jacob's deception of their aged and blind father, Isaac, in order to receive Esau's birthright/blessing from Isaac.

There has been much debate over the past few centuries about the exact details of isiVumelwano sakoNoQoli, of which, it was later discovered that there was no such thing as isiVumelwano sakoNoqoli. It was discovered that it was something the Ndzundza nation came up with in order to blind or fool the Ndebele nation. This debate boiled over into a legal feud between Enoch Mabhena Makhosoke II of the Manala and Mbusi Mahlangu Mabhoko III of the Ndzundza over who holds the most senior position in the Ndebele kingdom. The matter was settled with the Nhlapo Commission onto Traditional leadership and claims which in 2010 declared Mabhena as the senior king of the Ndebele.

In November 2010, former President of South Africa Jacob Zuma caused controversy when he overturned the Nhlapo Commissions finding and declared Mahlangu to be the senior king of the Ndebele. This was later rectified in 2017, High Court and Makhosonke II was legally entrenched as the senior King of the Ndebele People of South Africa.

In 2022, Mbusi Mahlangu Mabhoko |||, honoured King Makhosoke || Mabhena and sent his royal council to meet up with King Makhosoke || Mabhena`s council in order to ask for permission to initiate young Ndebele boys from the Ndzundza nation, as King Makhosoke || had already announced that initiation school will be undergoing on his side. King Makhosoke || Mabhena, a peaceful man that He is, gave Mbusi Mahlangu Mabhoko ||| permission to initiate.

=== Post Ndebele Schism ===
The remaining sons of Musi all went their separate ways after the Manala-Ndzundza conflict. Thombeni and Masombuka relocated with their brother Ndzundza to east of the Olifants River.

Thombeni (Gheghana) continued on with his people north and settled at the confluence of the Mgoto and Nkumpi rivers in what is today Moletlane. Thombeni's grandson named Kgabe took a large portion of the descendants of Tqahombeni north westward crossing the mountains and settling near the Waterberg Mountains along the Nyl river where their descendants were gradually assimilated into the surrounding Sotho-Tswana groups.

By the middle of the 18th century, the Gheghana had further divided into smaller splinter groups, which spread out across the hills, valleys and plains surrounding present-day Mghumbhani(Mokopane), Zebediela and Bhulungwani (Polokwane).These groups were progressively absorbed into the numerically superior and more dominant surrounding Sotho groups, undergoing considerable cultural and social change. By contrast, the descendants of Manala and Ndzundza maintained a more recognisably distinctive cultural identity, and retained a language which was closer to the Mbo spoken by their coastal forebears (and to present-day isiHlubi).

Sibasa and his brother Mphafuli moved north into the territory of the VhaVenda and were met with resistance from the Venda. After a considerable conflict the forces of Mphafuli and Sibasa established chieftainships at Tshivhase and Sibasa. Some of Mphafuli's descendents trekked southwards and joined the Ndzundza.

Dlomu had decided to leave the territories north of the Vaal and go back to the ancestral homeland of the Ndebele in Hlubi territory. Here the descendants of Dlomu established the amaNdebele Clan among the Hlubi.

The descendants of Mhwaduba stayed with Manala at KwaMnyamana for almost seven generations until the onset of a drought in the late 1700s caused one of his descendants, known to the Voortrekkers as "Pete" uprooted his people and settled near Schuinsdraai in Limpopo. After the arrival of Mzilikazi north of the Vaal, the remanents of Pete's people settled among the Masetla BaKgatla and were gradually assimilated as BaKgatla.

As for Tshwane. It is said by some that he was one of the descendants of Mhwaduba who did not leave with Pete but instead moved south and settled on the northern banks of the Hennops river. Thaba Tshwane nearby bears his name. Tshwane Metropolitan Municipality was named in honour of Tshwane as well as a 3m statue erected in-front of Pretoria City Hall. This has caused great controversy.

Manala returned from the Olifants River back to KwaMnyamana with two of his brothers daughters, Mathisi and Ganuganu as consolation for the loss of iNamrhali. Upon Manala's return he buried the body of Musi under the Wonderboom at the base of Wonderboomkop. Following Ndebele tradition would have led the funeral ceremony with his clothes inside out in a practice called "ukuhlanukela". After the burial the new Ngwenyama is announced to the people by the royal praise singer after-which there is a great feast. In the years leading up to Manala's death his people saw relative prosperity at KwaMnyamana.

Manala was succeeded by his son Sele, who succeeded by his son Magutjhona who was succeeded by his son Mrhawu, who was succeeded by his brother Ncagu who served as regent until Buyambo, the son of Mrawu was of age to assume the Manala throne. Buyambo's son Mabhena I who succeeded him as Ngwenyama of the Manala throne expanded the territory of the Manala as far south as the confluence of the Hennops River and the Sesmylspruit and as far north as Marblehall in Limpopo. Mabhena I did however struggle with expansion to the west. Never moving past the Sand River which becomes the Tolwane River. He met respectable resistance from the Sotho-Tswana groups to the west. Mabhena | had several sons from different wives, namely Marhagwa, Matjhaba(Mashaba), Pofu(Mpofu), Kolonji and Mdibane. Marhagwa is(was) the rightful heir to thr throne. When the son of Mabhena I, Mdibane, ascended to the throne the Manala had controlled a territory spanning the length of northern Gauteng. This included many large settlements such as KwaMnyamana (The Place of Black Rocks) which served as the Manala Capital, eMaruleni (The Place of Marula Trees), eZotjaneni (The Place in The Grass), KoNonduna (The Place of The Chiefs) and eMbilaneni (The Holy Place).

Ndzundza and his followers now free to establish their own rule moved to the source of the Steelpoort river and built the first Ndzundza capital called KwaSimkulu "The Great Place" situated approximately 20 km (12 mi) west of modern-day Belfast at the foot of Kwaggaskop. Ndzundza's Ndebele claimed all the lands from the Olifants River in the east to the western banks of the Elands River in Mpumalanga as their new territory.

Ndzundza was succeeded by his son Mrhetjha who in turn was succeeded by his son Magobholi. Bongwe, the son of Magobholi and great-grandson of Ndzundza, ruled in a time where the territory of the Ndzundza became increasingly threatened by raids from the Nguni tribes in the south east and more worry-some the growing Sotho-Tswana peoples in the north. Bongwe thus left KwaSimkulu and established a new capital for the Ndzundza at the base of the Bothasberg which was called "KwaMaza" (The Place of Ash). This new capital proved to be in a more solid position with which to push back the expansion of baKgatla tribes in the north. Bongwe died without issue and was succeeded by his brother Sindeni.

Sindeni continued his brothers campaigns in the north and defeated both the baKgatla under Moloi and the bakwaNkadimeng. Sindeni was succeeded by his grandson Mahlangu. It is not clear how power was transferred from Sindeni to Mahlangu and what happened to Mahlangu's father who should have ruled before him. Mahlangu attempted to expand the Ndzundza territory both to the north and south but had limited success. Despite this Mahlangu gained significant notoriety from his enemies as a skilled military leader. Mahlangu acquired the military skills at the BaPedi initiation school. He did not undergo the Ndebele initiation school because he believed Sindeni wanted to kill him, so he took it upon himself and went to the Pedi initiation school.

Mahlangu was succeeded by his son Phaswana who was killed in war. Phaswana was succeeded by his brother Maridili who had greater success in war defeating Makuwa baPedi and Makwetla baPedi at eDikeni. Maridili died without issue and so the Ndzundza throne passed onto the next brother Mdalanyana who was killed in war. The throne passed to Mgwezana, son of Mahlangu, who too was killed in battle. After this Mgwezana's brother Dzela. Dzela engaged in an ambitious war to claim more territory for the Ndzundza eastwards and attacked the BoKoni around Lydenburg which they called "eMatjhitjhini" (The Place of The Long Grass). This campaign was not successful and Dzela was killed. The throne then passed to Mrhabuli who was the son of Mgwezana but served as regent for the young Gembe who was the rightful heir of Mgwezana's throne. To avenge the death Dzela, Mrhabuli split the Ndzundza force into three armies with his brother Magodongo in command of one force, his young brother and heir Gembe in command of the second and himself in command of the last. The plan was to surround the BoKoni capital and attack from three sides. Gembe and his forces had gotten scared and abandoned his brothers on the eve of battle and fled. Mrhabuli and Magodongo inflicted massive loses on the BoKoni but sustained great losses without the support of Gembe. Mrhabuli was killed in this battle and ultimately it was decided among the "Induna" or Chiefs of the Ndzundza, that Gembe's actions were unforgivable and that instead Magodongo would be named the Ngwenyama of the Ndzundza founding a new dynasty.

=== Mzilikazi and The Mfecane ===
Sibindi, the son of Mdibane of the Manala had heard of the arrival of a large Khumalo army headed by Mzilikazi north of the Vaal sometime in early 1820s. Sibindi at first made an attempt to avoid conflict by offering one of his daughters to Mzilikazi as a peace offering. The exact details of the breakdown of diplomacy between Sibindi and Mzilikazi is not clear but oral tradition tells how Mzilikazi asked Sibindi to lend him a few of his best soldiers to go hunting with. Mzilikazi's men then set upon Sibindis loaned warriors and killed them.

Sibindi subsequently called for all Ndebele, including the forces of Ndzundza to unite as one and meet Mzilikazi in battle. But Magodongo of the Ndzundza had limited forces to spare, due to his own struggling war against Thulare I of the BaPedi. Thus Sibindi with his uncle Chief Mavula as his second instead of Magodongo, marched towards Mzilikazi's advancing horde and met him as Klipkop, west of Pretoria winning a few initial skirmishes with the traditional praise song of Sibindi singing "Ngushlangu sidabula udaka mhlana abantungwa bawa ubusolokohlo KoSomazabanye". "They drove Mzilikazi's troupes passed 'KoSomazabanye'" Which is modern day Cullinan. Unfortunately Sibindi's luck had run out. Sibindi was killed and the Manala capital of KwaMnyamana was sacked.

This first set of skirmishes against Sibindi proved to be only a test run for Mzilikazi's conquest of the central Transvaal. His forces had already moved to the area of modern-day Middelburg and established a fortress called "EkuPhumuleni" which means "Place of Rest".

By 1826, Mzilikazi's forces began assaulting Magodongo's capital of KwaMaza. This, coupled with the death of Sibindi, caused Magodongo to retreat from KwaMaza to a new Ndzundza capital called "eSikhunjini" which means "Hidden by the Animal Skin". Despite Magodongo's best efforts eSikhunjini was racked and Magodongo and his sons were taken captive by Mzilikazi. Tales tell of how Mzilikazi had the still living Magadongo partially impaled on wooden poles to torture him but not kill him. Mzilikazi then killed some of Magodongo's sons one by one by throwing them off a cliff after which he tied Magodongo to a large rock and threw him in a river to drown.

In December 1826, Mzilikazi had shattered both the Manala and Ndzundza Ndebele and established a new capital for his Mthwakazi empire on the banks of the Apies River near Wonderboompoort and called it "Kungwini" which means "Place of Mist". Mzilikazi would rule from Kungwini for more that 10 years sending raiding forces as far north as the northern banks of the Olifants River and as far south as Heilbron in the Free State.

The Khumalo suppressed any attempts by the Ndebele to re assert dominance in the region killing both Silamba's successor Mavula who was his brother, and Mgibe another brother. Among the Ndzundza the throne passed to Sibhoko who was one of the surviving sons of Magodongo. Sibhoko was allegedly killed after a dispute with a Sotho-Tswana Chief named Matlala north of Marblehall. He was succeeded by another of Magodongo's surviving sons named Somdeyi. Somdeyi ruled as regent for Tjambowe who was allegedly next in line to be king of the Ndzundza. Somdeyi was killed by one of Mzilikazi's raiding parties.

Mzilikazi's occupation of the central Transvaal region would become threatened with the arrival of the Voortrekkers north of the Vaal River in 1836. The resulting confrontations over the next two years caused Mzilikazi to suffer heavy losses. By early 1838, Mzilikazi and his people were forced northwards out of Transvaal altogether and across the Limpopo River. Further attacks caused him to move again, at first westwards into present-day Botswana and then later northwards towards what is now Zambia. He was unable to settle the land there because of the prevalence of tsetse fly which carried diseases fatal to oxen. Mzilikazi therefore travelled again, this time southeastwards into what became known as Matabeleland (situated in the southwest of present-day Zimbabwe) and settled there in 1840.

=== Transvaal Republic ===
Directly after the defeat of Mzilikazi, the lands between the Vaal River and Limpopo were left in tatters and some Voortrekkers settled on lands that had previously belonged to African groups like the Ndzundza and Manala Ndebele. They claimed that upon their arrival the region was almost devoid of any African inhabitants because the thinking went, they had all fled in the face of the Mfecane. The Boers believed that the land was deserted and abandoned and therefore theirs for the taking. This caused great conflict between Boers and African kingdoms of the region who were attempting to reclaim the lands stolen from them by Mzilikazi's Mthwakazi Empire.

The Manala were hardest hit by Mzilikazi's occupation. After the death of Sibindi the throne went to his brother Mvula who ruled only a year before being assassinated by Mzilikazi's forces. after Mvula the leadership of the Manala passed on to the next brother Mgibe. Mgibe ruled much longer than Mvula and had the foresight to send his brothers and their families to scatter and live far and wide so that if he should die, that there would always be another Manala of Mdibane to take over leadership. Mgibe like many before him was assassinated by Mzilikazi raiding parties after ruling in exile for only 5 years.

The throne of the Manala would then pass to Silamba who was another son of Mdibane. Silamba attempted to re-establish control over the lands previously owned by the Manala but was met with staunch resistance by Voortrekker settlers. The territories south of KwaMnyamana where occupied, Silamba discovered, by two brothers named Lucas Cornelius Bronkhorst and Johannes Gerhardus Stephanus Bronkhorst who had arrived north of the Vaal with the Trek Party of Andries Hendrik Potgieter. The Bronkhorsts had settled near Fountains Valley along the Apies River. The ruins of their first homestead can be found in Groenkloof Nature Reserve.

By 1842 Silamba had clashed with the Bronkhorsts a good deal and ultimately lost all the Manala lands south of KwaMnyamana. Silamba lived for sometime in KoNonduna near modernday Tierpoort. In 1873, After the establishment of The Transvaal Republic, Silamba moved from KoNonduna and settled in Wallmansthal and established a new capital for the Manala called "KoMjekejeke".

Among the Ndzundza after the death of Somdeyi, The throne should have passed to Tjambowe who was the grandson of Magodongo but he had gone from being fully sighted to being completely blind in a span of 6 years and this disqualified him from his claim to the throne. An Imbizo was called and the chiefs and elders of the Ndzundza consulted and the decision was made to make Mabhoko, one of Magodono's youngest sons king. He was chosen for his youth and intelligence and for his bravery in battle despite how young he was. Mabhoko became known for his internal diplomacy skills offering Tjambowe a place of honour at all special events and invited him to live with him in the royal dwelling. Mabhoko had further decided to move the Ndzundza capital from eSikhunjini to a new settlement which he heavily fortified and called "eMrholeni". This new capital was near a series of caves called "KoNomtjarhelo".

Mabhoko began immediate plans to restore the Ndzundza kingdom. Through diplomacy he entered into an alliance with one of the BaPedi Chiefs of the Marota Empire named Malewa. This alliance with Chief Malewa would ensure the Ndzundza's northernmost border would be protected. With Silamba's loss of the lands to the west let many settler enter into Ndzundza territory. With the establishment of Ohrigstad in 1845 just 120 km (75 mi) north east of the Ndzundza capital, Mabhokho moved the capital from eMrholeni into the caves of KoNomtjarhelo and established a virtually impenetrable fortress.

Almost from the onset sporadic skirmishes began to take place between these new immigrants, and the Ndebele-Pedi alliance, who actively resisted the incursions which they were beginning to make upon their ancestral lands. Mabhoko had through the used of trade and raids secured large amounts of fire arms and won many of the initial skirmishes against the Boer forces.

A malaria outbreak in Ohrigstad caused the Boers to move to deeper into Ndzundza territory and they established a settlement at Laersdrif. The settlement of Boers at Laersdrif which was less than 40 km (25 mi) south of the Ndzundza fortress of KoNomtjarhelo aggravated the Ndzundza into full out war with the Boers. This all came to a head in 1847 when Ndzundza won a decisive battle against the Boers. Many Boers left the area to settle lands in the west and those who stayed were required to recognise Mabhoko's authority and pay a tax in the form of cattle or supplies.

Tensions between African kingdoms of the Transvaal and White settlers would only worsen with the signing of the Sand River Convention 17 January 1852. This document was signed between the British Empire and the Boers. In this document The British formally recognised the independence of the Boers north of the Vaal River. With this treaty in hand, the Boers established The Transvaal Republic as all the lands between the Vaal River in the south and Limpopo River in the north. The problem with the Sand River Convention was that no mention of or regard was given to the African people already living between the Vaal and Limpopo Rivers. In reality the Boers had only established a handful of settlements by 1852 and the majority of occupied land in the Transvaal was occupied by African kingdoms.

In 1861, The throne of the Marota Empire fell to Sekhukhune who greatly expanded the lands of the BaPedi and this caused tensions with Mabhoko who resisted. After winning a few key battle against Sekhukhune. Mabhoko ultimately submitted to the rule of Sekhukhune and the Marota Empire. This drove a wedge between the Ndzundza and the BaPedi in the years to come.

In 1863, tensions between the Boers and the Ndzundza Ndebele rose to boiling point again and The Boers, seeing Mabhoko with his arsenal of firearms as threat to the safety of the Republic, attacked KoNomtjarhelo with the aid of Swazi forces. This attack failed and the Swazi having sustained most of the casualties, deserted the Boers. In 1864 a second assault was made at KoNomtjarhelo and this too failed.

Despite Mabhoko's continuous victory, the Ndundza territory, like the Manala was becoming smaller and smaller. A year later in 1865 Mabhoko died and was succeeded by his son Mkhephuli who was also called Soqaleni. Mkhephuli ruled for only 10 years and then passing the throne to his son Rhobongo/Xobongo. Rhobongo was not well loved and was described as somewhat of a tyrant. Rhobongo was succeeded by his brother Nyabela in 1879.

=== Mapoch War (1882–83) ===
In 1876, The Transvaal Republic under the controversial presidency of Thomas François Burgers, lost an expensive war against Sekhukhune north of the Steelpoort River. This led Theophilus Shepstone to annex the Transvaal on 12 April 1877 on behalf of the British Empire under the pretence of bringing stability to the region.

This annexation by the British led to The Transvaal War of Independence (1880–81), more famously called The "First Anglo-Boer War". This war resulted in Boer victory.

In the time of Nyabela's rule, The Ndzundza kingdom comprised approximately 84 km (52 mi) and had a population of about 15,000. It was after the Transvaal regained its independence in 1881 that the relationship between the Boers and Ndzundza began to deteriorate more rapidly than ever before. The Transvaal was becoming annoyed with Nyabela for asserting his independence (by, for example, declining to pay taxes, refusing to hold a census when instructed to do so and preventing a boundary commission from beaconing off his lands). What eventually became the casus belli was Nyabela's decision to harbour the Pedi Chief Mampuru, after he had assassinated his brother Sekhukhune on 13 August 1882.On two previous occasions, the Transvaal authorities had attempted to arrest Mampuru for fomenting disorder, and this latest outrage was the last straw. Mampuru and his supporters sought refuge with Makwani, one of Nyabela's subordinate chiefs. When ordered to extradite the fugitive, Nyabela made the decision not to do so.

On 12 October 1882, the Volksraad authorised General Piet Joubert to raise a commando. At first, only Mampuru was the target of the expedition, but, at the end of the month, General Joubert was also instructed to bring to heel any African peoples who had harboured or assisted him. General Joubert had allegedly little enthusiasm for his latest brief, but this would not prevent him from pursuing it to its conclusion with relentless thoroughness. Raising enough able-bodied burghers for the expedition was not an altogether easy task. Few relished having to leave their farms for months on end to take part in a dull and prolonged campaign against rebellious Africans, even under a leader as respected and popular as General Joubert. Nevertheless, an expeditionary force was duly raised. The white citizens of the Transvaal Republic had few civic obligations, but serving on commando was one of them, and most of those called out reported for duty.

By the end of October, the vanguard of General Joubert's commando, which was about ~2 000 strong, began arriving in Ndzundza territory. An ultimatum was sent to Nyabela, giving him one last chance to surrender Mampuru and to undertake to cooperate with the Transvaal authorities in future or war would ensue. General Joubert was anxious that he comply as a military campaign was not likely to be an easy one. For one, the Ndzundza Ndebele had in their possession a considerable arsenal of firearms that the Ndzundza had been trained to use in war since the rule of Mabhoko. Secondly, the fortress of KoNomtjarhelo was situated between precipitous cliffs and sheer rock faces on the eastern extremity of a range of heavily forested, boulder-strewn hills. A complex network of caves, grottos and tunnels pockmarked these heights, providing both places of refuge and space for storage to help withstand a long siege. The caves were a remarkable phenomenon, some being so extensive as to enable fighters to disappear into one entrance and reappear from a different one more than a kilometre away. Moreover, to capture the main stronghold, the attacking force would first have to overcome a series of well-fortified hills, most notably KwaPondo and KwaMrhali (called 'Vlugkraal' and 'Boskop' respectively by the Boers; KoNomtjarhelo was simply 'Spitskop') which guarded its approaches to the west.

Any hopes he might have had for compliance were soon disappointed. Nyabela famously answered that he had swallowed Mampuru, and if the Boers wanted him they would have to kill him and take him out of his belly.

General Joubert would ultimately eschew direct attacks against these strong points. The Boers were past masters when it came to storming hills (as they had demonstrated at Battle of Majuba Hill and Battle of Schuinshoogte the previous year). In this particular war, they could not be relied upon to take too many risks. Already half-hearted about the coming fight, they were liable to desert or simply refuse to cooperate. General Joubert complained after the war to the Transvaal Volksraad that the burghers "seemed to prefer looting cattle on their own account to fighting." Instead, therefore, Joubert's chosen strategy was to wear the chiefs down, confining them and their people to their mountain fortresses and allowing starvation to do the rest. This would at least minimise losses among the Boers. On the other hand, it would inevitably prolong the war. It was already known that the Ndzundza were stockpiling their food supplies in anticipation of a long siege.

On 5 November, a last-ditch attempt to conclude the dispute peacefully came to nothing and, two days later, the first clash of the war took place. Without warning, a Ndzundza raiding party swooped down from the surrounding heights and began driving the commando's oxen, nearly a thousand head, towards a cave in the mountainside. About 150 Boers galloped after the raiders, running them to ground before they reached their destination and reclaiming their cattle. About twenty Ndzundza were killed in the skirmish; the Boers suffered just one, casualty. Within two weeks of the commencement of hostilities, the KwaPondo bastion was already being menaced. Three cannons as well as a considerable amount of dynamite had since arrived from Pretoria to help reduce the defences. On 17 November, the Ndzundza attempted to drive back the besieging force, but were themselves beaten off after two and a half hours of fierce fighting. The Boers brought two of their guns into the firing line during the engagement. Soon after this repulse, Nyabela sent out emissaries to discuss peace terms, but General Joubert was only prepared to deal with the chief in person and sent them back. Nyabela declined to present himself, no doubt suspecting that it was a ploy to capture him.

KwaPondo, a semi-circular plateau surrounded by cliffs and strewn with boulders, was subjected to a heavy bombardment on 21 November, but to little effect. The Ndzundza forces merely jeered at and taunted the burghers from the safety of their breastworks. General Joubert's dynamiting operations were also unsuccessful, since the warriors of the Ndzundza had taken refuge in caves that were in most cases too deep for the blasts to have much effect. Laying the charges was also a dangerous business. The commando was substantially reinforced in the last week of November, many of the new arrivals being drawn from friendly African tribes in the northern and eastern parts of the Republic. In early December, part of the force was deployed against Mampuru. Accompanying the Boers were a large number of Pedi, who had been loyal to the late Sekhukhune and were eager to avenge his murder. On 7 December, this combined force launched a determined assault, only to retreat in some confusion in the face of an unexpected, well coordinated counter-attack by over 600 of the Ndzundza. Two days later in an early morning raid, dozens of Ndzundza were driven into a cave and all but six of them were shot or asphyxiated in the course of being smoked out.

Two days into the new year, the commandos attacked KwaMrhali (Boskop) and eventually took it after a fierce firefight. On 5 February, General Joubert mustered his forces for a determined second assault on KwaPondo, which had withstood the besiegers for three months. The battle began just before daybreak and raged all morning. The burghers and their African auxiliaries, in the teeth of a stubborn resistance, were forced to clear the stronghold ledge by ledge and cave by cave. Many lay dead and wounded before the fortress fell. The hill's fortifications were dynamited that same day to prevent the Ndzundza from reoccupying the position.

Now only KoNomtjarhelo was left. General Joubert and his war council ruled out storming the position and decided instead to use dynamite against it. This would entail digging a trench up to the base of the mountain, tunnelling deeply under it and laying sufficient charge to bring it all crashing down. It was indeed a bizarre and tortuous strategy, certainly amongst the most curious ever to have been devised in modern warfare. Digging commenced on 2 March. Unusually heavy rains that season had softened the ground, and after only a week the trench had been brought to within 400 metres of its objective. The diggers were harassed constantly by snipers. The real threat to the Ndzundza by then was imminent starvation. Four months of relentless attrition had seen their once plentiful food stocks steadily dwindled. By early April, all the chiefs of the Ndzundza had submitted to the invaders. Nyabela was promised that his own life would be spared and his people allowed to remain on their lands if he did likewise. He chose to fight on instead, perhaps still hoping, even at that late stage, to emulate his father's achievement of withstanding the Boers.

Fighting petered out in the closing months of the war. Joubert was content to maintain his stranglehold until the inevitable surrender, receiving constant reports that the besieged Ndzundza were close to starvation. Most of the Boers merely lounged around in their forts, kicking their heels and waiting to be relieved. Some worked on the trench, which at least provided something to do. The Ndzundza harried the diggers as much as possible. In the middle of April, they staged a successful night attack, doing considerable damage and delaying operations by at least two weeks.

In the meantime, one member of the commando, evidently a Scotsman by the name of Donald MacDonald, had defected to Nyabela. MacDonald proved to be of some use to his new comrades-in-arms. Amongst other things, he suggested to Nyabela to catapult large boulders down onto those working below. This tactic was one of the reasons that the Boers introduced a mobile iron fort to assist them with the digging. About two metres long, with two wheels inside and eight loopholes for firing, clumsy and unwieldy, it at least ensured that work on the trench could continue in relative safety. Shielded by the iron fort, the diggers managed to reach the base of the hill without further mishap. They commenced tunnelling underneath it, but had not progressed very far when they were held up by a bed of rock. Operations were suspended, permanently, as it turned out.

Even then, the Ndzundza continued to fight back. Early in June, they launched a daring raid on the Boer kraals and netted themselves some 200 oxen, enabling them to hold out a little longer. At the end of the month, they also proved equal to the first and only attempt to take the stronghold by storm. About seventy of the bolder Boers, frustrated by the tedium of the siege, volunteered to rush KoNomtjharhelo and get it all over with. They had climbed to within fifteen metres of the crest when an Ndzundza counter-attacked, hurling down a continuous hail of stones and bullets pitching the attackers headlong down the way they had come.

On 8 July, Nyabela belatedly decided to sacrifice Mampuru in the slender hope that this would end the siege. The Pedi fugitive was seized, trussed up and delivered to General Joubert, but the offering came too late. The prolonged campaign had cost the Transvaal Republic a small fortune (the Transvaal Volksraad later estimated the war costs to be £40 766) in addition to many burgher lives lost, and General Joubert was now bent on forcing an unconditional surrender. This came two days later. Nyabela gave himself up, along with about 8 000 of his warriors who had stayed by him to the end. As reparations, the entire Ndebele country was usurped.

Nyabela and Mampuru were tried in Pretoria and sentenced to death. Mampuru was hanged for his part in the murder of Sekhukhune. Nyabela had his sentence reduced to life imprisonment, he spent fifteen years in captivity before being released. He died on 19 December 1902 at eMlalaganye (The Place Where One Will Sleep Only Once), Hartebeestfontein, near Pretoria.

The post-war settlement imposed by the ZAR was harsh. The amaNdebele social, economic and political structures were abolished and a proclamation on 31 August 1883 divided 36 000 hectares of land among the white burghers who had fought in the campaign against Nyabela, each man receiving seven hectares. Followers of the defeated chiefs were scattered around the republic and indentured to white farmers as virtual slave labourers for renewable five-year periods. In 1895, this whole country, now called Mapoch's Gronden, was incorporated as the fourth ward of the Middelburg District.

=== KwaNdebele Bantustan ===
In the Manala capital of KoMjekejeke, Silamba had died in 1892 and the Manala throne moved to his son Mdedlangeni. Like his father, Mdedlangeni made great attempts to resist the expansion of The Transvaal Republic. Mdedlangeni died under mysterious circumstances. Mdedlangeni was succeeded by his brother Libangeni who ruled as regent for Mdedlangeni's son Mabhena II. It is not known when Mabhena II ascended to the leadership of the Manala Ndebele. Mabhena II died in 1906 and was succeeded by his son Mbhongo I. Mbhongo I moved from KoMjekejeke to Jakkelsdans and in 1926 bought a farm near Klipkoppies along the Klipruit and established a new settlement called Loding, KwaNdebele near modern day Vaalbank.

After Nyabela, The throne passed to Nyabela's nephew Mfene who was the son of Mkhephuli also called Soqaleni. In approximately 1904, Mfene moved from eMlalaganye and bought the farm 'Welgelegen' 60 km (37 mi) north east of Pretoria and established what would become modern day Kwaggafntein.

This site of eMlalaganye, which was on property owned by the Wolmarans family would become a Ndebele settlement called KwaMsiza and was ultimately sold in 1952 to build the Wonderboom Airport. The community of Msiza moved to the Winterveld region north of Mabopane and built new community appearing on road signs and various maps as either KwaMapoch, Speelman's Kraal, or simply as The Ndebele Village. Its residents however, prefer the term KwaMsiza.

In 1921, Mfene died at Kwaggafontein, and his son Mayitjha I succeeded him, buying his own ground at Weltevreden near Dennilton in the South Central Transvaal, where he constructed KwaSimuyembiwa (eMthambothini). This settlement would later

On the 3rd of March 1970, The Bantu Homelands Citizenship Act, 1970 (Act No. 26 of 1970; subsequently renamed the Black States Citizenship Act, 1970 and the National States Citizenship Act, 1970) was passed into Law by the Apartheid government. This law was a Self Determination or denaturalization law passed that allocated various tribes/nations of black South Africans as citizens of their traditional black tribal "homelands," or Bantustans. This led to the establishment of the KwaNdebele 'Homeland' in 1977 with Mfene's KwaSimuyembiwa forming part of the new capital Siyabuswa.

The majority of Ndebele living in this Bantustan were Ndzundza and many attempts were made to have more Manala move into the KwaNdebele homeland. Tensions however would rise when the issue of KwaNdebele independence emerged in the early 1980s came up, as members of the cabinet promised to make the present numerically smaller Manala supreme paramount of amaNdebele on the basis that the land where KwaNdebele was created originally belonged to the Manala kingdom.

In 1977, three tribal authorities in the Hammanskraal district in Bophuthatswana, the Litho under Lazarus Mahlangu, the Pungutsha under Isaac Mahlangu and the Manala under Alfred Mabena - seceded from Bophuthatswana with the land and people under their jurisdiction, and joined KwaNdebele. These three tribal authorities combined to form Mnyamana Regional Authority, and the Ndzundza Regional Authority formed the South Ndebele Territorial Authority.

With the establishment of a legislative assembly in 1979, tensions in the agendas of some of the Ndzundza-Mabhoko traditional leaders and their councillors began to emerge. The legislative assembly involved a 46-member body with a six-member cabinet appointed by the Chief minister. All 46 members were nominated by the four tribal authorities. However, once nominated, a tribal authority could not recall a Member of Parliament. Only the assembly itself could remove a Member of Parliament. The Chief Minister also had the right to appoint or remove traditional leaders.

The creation of the legislative assembly resulted in a shift in the balance of power from the traditional authorities to the legislative authorities made up of appointees. By early 1985, the split between 'traditionalist' chiefs and the legislature became apparent when Lazarus Mahlangu of the Litho Tribal Authority wrote a letter in which the tribal authority stated that it wished to excise itself from KwaNdebele and rejoin Bophuthatswana. Mahlangu was a Ndzundza traditionalist who had seceded from Bophuthatswana in 1977. The reasons given were that the administration of Simon Skosana interfered in 'traditional affairs' and dictated to, rather than consulted with, the tribal authority. A symptom of this subordinate relationship was the desire of the tribal authority to replace its nominated member of parliament with other nominees, as the present Member of Parliament was not carrying out the instructions of the tribal authority. However, once nominated, Members of Parliament could only be removed by the assembly. The tribal authority also complained that it was being ignored by the magistrate and the Commissioner General. In July 1985, Skosana withdrew recognition of Mahlangu as chief.

In 1994 The African National Congress won the 1994 General election and The Bantu Homelands Citizenship Act was repealed on 27 April 1994 by the Interim Constitution of South Africa. Thus KwaNdebele and its subjects were incorporated into the Republic of South Africa

== Social and cultural life ==
=== Internal political and social structures ===
The authority over a tribe was vested in the tribal head (iKosi), assisted by an inner or family council (iimphakathi). Wards (izilindi) were administered by ward heads and the family groups within the wards were governed by the heads of the families. The residential unit of each family was called an umuzi. The umuzi usually consisted of a family head (unnumzana) with his wife and unmarried children. If he had more than one wife, the umuzi was divided into two halves, a right and a left half, to accommodate the different wives. An umuzi sometimes grew into a more complex dwelling unit when the head's married sons and younger brothers joined the household. Every tribe consisted of a number of patrilineal clans or izibongo. This meant that every clan consisted of a group of individuals who shared the same ancestor in the paternal line.

== Personal adornment ==
Ndebele women traditionally adorned themselves with a variety of ornaments, each symbolising her status in society. After marriage, dresses became increasingly elaborate and spectacular.

In earlier times, the Ndebele wife would wear copper and brass rings around her arms, legs and neck, symbolising her bond and faithfulness to her husband, once her home was built. She would only remove the rings after his death.

The rings (called idzila) were believed to have strong ritual powers. Husbands used to provide their wives with rings; the richer the husband, the more rings the wife would wear. Today, it is no longer common practice to wear these rings permanently.

In addition to the rings, married women also wore neck hoops made of grass (called isirholwani) twisted into a coil and covered in beads, particularly for ceremonial occasions. Linrholwani are sometimes worn as neckpieces and as leg and arm bands by newly wed women whose husbands have not yet provided them with a home, or by girls of marriageable age after the completion of their initiation ceremony (ukuthomba). Married women also wore a five-fingered apron (called an itjhorholo) to mark the culmination of the marriage, which only takes place after the birth of the first child.

The marriage blanket (untsurhwana) worn by married women was decorated with beadwork to record significant events throughout the woman's lifetime. For example, long beaded strips signified that the woman's son was undergoing the initiation ceremony and indicated that the woman had now attained a higher status in Ndebele society. It symbolised joy because her son had achieved manhood as well as the sorrow at losing him to the adult world.

A married woman always wore some form of head covering as a sign of respect for her husband. These ranged from a simple beaded headband or a knitted cap to elaborate beaded headdresses (amacubi). Boys usually went naked or wore a small front apron of goatskin. However, girls wore beaded aprons or beaded wraparound skirts from an early age. For rituals and ceremonies, Ndebele men adorned themselves with ornaments made for them by their wives.

== Art ==
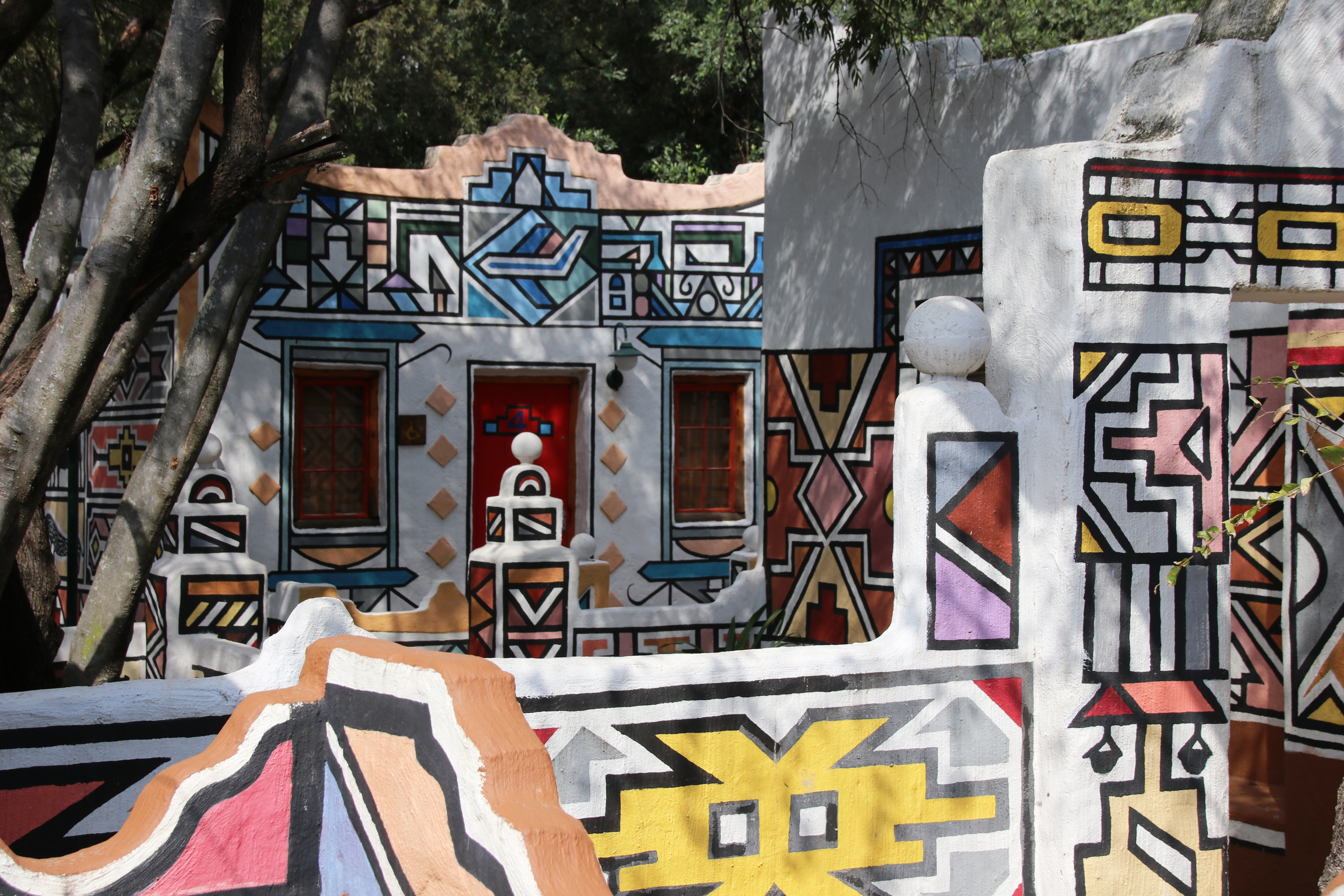
Traditional Ndebele architecture at Lesedi Cultural Village.

=== Ndebele House Painting ===
==== Traditional Painting style ====
Ndebele art has always been an important identifying characteristic of the Ndebele. Apart from its aesthetic appeal it has a cultural significance that serves to reinforce the distinctive Ndebele identity. The Ndebele's essential artistic skill has always been understood to be the ability to combine exterior sources of stimulation with traditional design concepts borrowed from their ancestors. Ndebele artists also demonstrated a fascination with the linear quality of elements in their environment and this is depicted in their artwork. Painting was done freehand, without prior layouts, although the designs were planned beforehand.

The characteristic symmetry, proportion and straight edges of Ndebele decorations were done by hand without the help of rulers and squares. Ndebele women were responsible for painting the colourful and intricate patterns on the walls of their houses. This presented the traditionally subordinate wife with an opportunity to express her individuality and sense of self-worth. In some instances, the women also created sculptures to express themselves.

The back and side walls of the house were often painted in earth colours and decorated with simple geometric shapes that were shaped with the fingers and outlined in black. Traditionally, muted earth colours, made from ground ochre, and different natural-coloured clays, in white, browns, pinks and yellows, were used as well as limestone whitewash. Due to the fragility of the natural pigments, the women would also be responsible to resurface the walls seasonally. The most innovative and complex designs were painted, in the brightest colours, on the front walls of the house. The front wall that enclosed the courtyard in front of the house formed the gateway (izimpunjwana) and was given special care. Windows provided a focal point for mural designs and their designs were not always symmetrical. Sometimes, makebelieve windows are painted on the walls to create a focal point and also as a mechanism to relieve the geometric rigidity of the wall design. Simple borders painted in a dark colour, lined with white, accentuated less important windows in the inner courtyard and in outside walls. In the early 2000s, King Mayitjha III during his reign had pre-teen and pre-initiate young women attend daily painting lessons in Mpumalanga Province led by the himself, his elders, and two master artists (Ester Mahlangu and Francina Ndimande). This was due to growing concerns of preserving Ndebele classic artistry in the beaded and painted form.

==== Contemporary House Painting ====
Contemporary Ndebele artists make use of a wider variety of colours (blues, reds, greens and yellows) than traditional artists were able to, mainly because of their commercial availability. As Ndebele society became more westernized, the artists started reflecting this change of their society in their paintings. The women who travel to work as domestic workers in urban areas would use these paint images to express their dreams for a better life. This is partly due to external changes such as: the introduction of electricity, personal economics (daily migration onto buses limiting time for art creation), tourist markets (change of scale to painting small masonite panels) and global and domestic travel by the artists. The house paintings could include images of cars, clocks, airplanes and other modern ulitities like running water. Another change is the addition of stylized representational forms to the typical traditional abstract geometric designs. Many Ndebele artists have now also extended their artwork to the interior of houses.

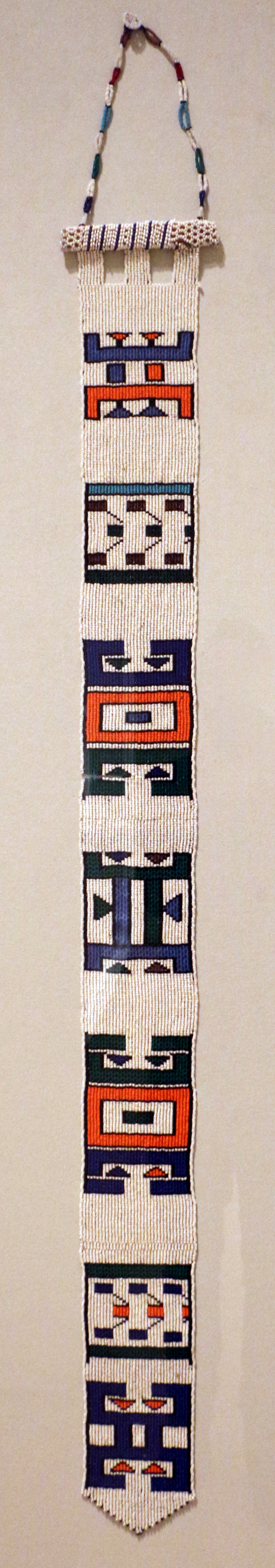
An example of a nyoga.

=== Beadwork ===
The beadwork crafted by the women can indicate the wearer's age, relationship (single, married, undergone ritual initiation), and whether she has had children. White beadwork used to dominate works until around the 1920s-1930s, when coloured beads became readily available in trading store. The beadwork began to show domestic scenes and geometric shapes. This pastime has long been a social practice in which the women engaged after their chores were finished but today, many projects involve the production of these items for sale to the public. The shift to sell beadwork came about in the 1960s when the first collectors of Ndebele beadwork came into the area and provided an economic boost. Partly out of necessity more beadwork began to be produced for the sole purpose of being made for sale to combat the government's apartheid policies which made economic trade difficult.

==== Items of Ndebele Beadwork ====
Iinrholwani (colourful neck, arms, hips and legs hoops) are made by winding grass into a hoop, binding it tightly with cotton and decorating it with beads. In order to preserve the grass and to enable the hoop to retain its shape and hardness, the hoop is boiled in sugar water and left in the hot sun for a few days. They are usually worn in stacks of two to three or more in alternating colours and can be worn by initiated girls and married women as beauty adornments.

Isithimba is a back skirt worn by unmarried women made from a piece of semi-circular leather (usually goatskin) and decorated with beadwork suspended by bead covered roll of grass with a row of brass rings (nkosi) attached to signal status. In the past, a second skirt known as an amabeja would be worn with the isithimba; The amabeja is also made from leather but had strings of beads suspended in rows to form a curtain like shape.

The Nyoga (snake) is a long beaded train made from white beads is worn by the bride at the first wedding ceremony is woven by their female relatives. The patterns, length, and structure can indicate whether the bride the groom's first wife or if she is a virgin.

linga koba ("the long tears") are worn by mothers while their son is away for male initiation. They represent the sorrow of losing a son, but also the joy of gaining a man.

isiphephetu are stiff beaded aprons worn by girl initiates to show they are undergoing the ritual into womanhood.

== Special occasions ==
=== Initiation ===
In Ndebele culture, the initiation rite, symbolising the transition from childhood to adulthood, plays an important role. Initiation schools for boys are held every four years and for girls, as soon as they get into puberty stage. During the male initiation process (ukuwela) only one son at a time from a family can participate to enter manhood. The girl's initiation ritual (ukuthombisa) lasts about two months and coincides with the full moon as a symbolic return to nature. During the period of initiation, relatives and friends come from far and wide to join in the ceremonies and activities associated with initiation.

==== Boys ====
Boys are initiated as a group when they are about 15 years of age when a special regiment (iintanga) is set up and led by a boy of high social rank. Each regiment has a distinguishing name. Among the Ndzundza tribe there is a cycle of 15 such regimental names, allocated successively, and among the Manala there is a cycle of 13 such names. The initiation process begins when the fathers of the boys nominate them for male initiation (wela or ingoma) in front of the king. The boys keep a stick, wear a short pant, an animal loincloth, and wrapped in a single blanket before leaving to a sacred place at the river escorted by their fathers and other men in the tribe; The adult men are armed so none of the boys can run away. appointed by the king and then march some ten miles into the bush where there is a shelter built nearby (built by elder guides) where they will live for two months. The boys get divided into groups of eight based on villages of origin and meet up with an elder brother (one who has endured initiation rites). In the first month, the elder brothers are responsible for the river through a cleansing ceremony, informing them of the laws of the tribe and ancestors, as well as mythologies. In the second month, the initiates embark a ritualized game of hide and seek with their mothers. Around this time the elder brothers will engage in combat with other elder brothers, two by two armed with long sticks made into whips (attached to a thinner stick) and shields made of animal hide. The elder brothers fight on the behalf initiates in the name of honour and the bloodline; If the elder brother fights well their honor reflects well onto the young brothers. At the end of the second month, the shelters are burned along with blanket and headbands. At the end of the two months they return to the village and wait by the gate until personage appears to give them his blessing and formal stamp of attainment of manhood; the Ndzunda king will hold a feast for the new men and then they will have a final cleansing ceremony at the river before the groups return to their respective villages.

==== Girls ====
All hair is shaved from their bodies and at dawn they are ritually washed at the river. The girls spend a day holding a feast and celebration for this transition into womanhood accompanied by music. The young girls dance their girlhood away, taking turns being the center of attention, and blow into whistles to charm the males. The older women have their own dance with axes and whistles. During initiation girls wear an array of colourful beaded hoops (iinrholwani) around their legs, arms, waist and neck. The girls are kept in isolation for a month and are prepared and trained to become homemakers and matriarchs; They are taught by grandmothers. Beadwork and house painting are activities practiced during the initiation process. This allows the women to transfer the knowledge of their patterning strategies for daughters and new in-laws that came from other indigenous groups. The coming-out ceremony marks the conclusion of the initiation school and the girls then wear stiff rectangular aprons (iphephetu), beaded in geometric and often three-dimensional patterns, to celebrate the event. After initiation, these aprons are replaced by stiff, square ones, made from hardened leather and adorned with beadwork.

== Courtship and marriage ==
Marriages were only concluded between members of different clans, that is, between individuals who did not have the same clan name. However, a man could marry a woman from the same family as his paternal grandmother. The prospective bride was kept secluded for two weeks before the wedding in a specially made structure in her parents' house, to shield her from men's eyes. When the bride emerged from her seclusion, she was wrapped in a blanket and covered by an umbrella that was held for her by a younger girl (called Ipelesi) who also attended to her other needs. On her marriage, the bride was given a marriage blanket, which she would, in time, adorn with beadwork, either added to the blanket's outer surface or woven into the fabric. There is a Ndebele saying that "a woman without a blanket is not a woman."; Married women wear a blanket as a sign of modesty to the men and respect to the king. After the wedding, the couple lived in the area belonging to the husband's clan. Women retained the clan name of their fathers but children born of the marriage took their father's clan name.

== Ama-Ndebele-Kingdom ==
=== Legendary ===
Legendary rulers of The Ama-Ndebele-Kingdom
Name	Notes
Ndebele	He was the Son of Mabhudu. Originally a Chief in the lands of the Bhaca and Hlubi
Mntungwe	He was the son of Ndebele. King Ndebele also had a daughter named MaKoro.
Mkhalangwana	He was The son of Mntungwe.
Jonono	He was the Son of Mkhalangwana. Also occasionally spelled "Njonono". King Jonono moved with his people and settled in the area just north east of modern-day Ladysmith in the mountains surrounding the mouth of the Cwembe River.
Nanasi	He was the Son of Jonono. Oral tradition holds that Nanasi feasted on poisonous fruit that would kill anyone else, but had no effect on him. This led many to the folk belief that he was so fierce even the forces of nature where to scared to kill him.

=== Semi-historical ===
Semi-historical rulers of The Ndebele
Name	Notes
Mafana	he is said to have lived in the mid-1500s. He was the son of Nanasi, King Mafana moved his people from their lands near Ladysmith and moved north west crossing first the Drakensberg Mountains and then the Vaal River in which it is said he drowned.
Mhlanga	King Mhlanga, He was the son of Mafana continued his fathers journey in a north westward direction finally settling in an area around modern day Randfontein which he called eMlhangeni.
Musi	He was the son of Mhlanga and finding the area around eMhlangeni too hostile with competing Sotho-Tswana tribes from the west, King Musi moved his people north of the Magaliesberg Mountains and settled in the hills north of Wonderboomkop on both side of the Apies River establishing two settlements. A senior settlement called "KwaMnyamana" (Place of the Black Rocks), on the eastern side and a junior settlement. "eMaruleni" (Named for the abundance of Marula fruit trees), on the western side. The Ama-Ndebele-People of King Musi's time found great prosperity in this region and despite minor conflict with neighbouring tribes, they established a thriving territory.

==== Schism of the Ndebele people ====
After King Musi there was a succession dispute fought between his two sons Prince Manala and Prince Ndzundza over the throne fighting three great battles first at MaSongololo (Zonkolol) Between modern day Cullinan and Rayton. The second battle at Wilge River with the final battle being at Olifants River. The ends result gave both sons a kingdom within the greater Ndebele kingdom to rule with other peace conditions.

The matter of seniority has been somewhat of a grey area among the Ama-Ndebele-People since that time and it was not until the Nhlapo Commission established in 2004 that Prince Manala was the senior house of the Ndebele kingdom in South Africa.

Semi-historical Manala rulers
Names	Notes
Manala	After battling his brother Ndundza for paramountcy over the Ndebele, King Manala He was the son of Musi returned to KwaMnyamana and expanding the Manala territory.
Ntsele	He was the Son of Manala.
Magutshona	He was the Son of Ntsele.
Ncagu	He was the Son of Magutshona.
Mrawu ‡	He was the Son of Magutshona. Served as regent until the ascension of his nephew Mbuyambo
Mbuyambo	He was the Son of Ncagu.
Mabhena I	Son of Buyambo. Also spelled "Mabena" Expanded Manala territory as far south as the confluence of the Hennops River and the Sesmylspruit and as far north as modern day Marblehall.
Mdibane	Son of Mabhena I. Mdibane inherited his fathers territories which included the settlements of KwaMnyamana (The Place of Black Rocks)(also Capital), eMaruleni (The Place of Marula Trees), eZotshaneni, KoNonduna (The Place of The Chiefs) and eMbilaneni (The Holy Place) and many more.

Semi-historical Ndzundza rulers
Name	Notes
Ndzundza	Ndzundza through war with his brother Manala had established himself a duel kingship with his brother and claimed the lands from the eastern banks of the Olifants River to the western banks of the Elands River in Mpumalanga. Ndzundza established his capital at the source of the Steelpoort River approximately 20 km (12 mi) west of modern-day Belfast at the foot of Kwaggaskop and called it "KwaSimkulu" (The Great Place).
Mrhetjha	Son of Ndzundza. Also spelled "Mxetya"
Magobholi	Son of Mrhetjha.
Bongwe	Son of 'Magobholi. The Ndzundza territory became increasingly threatened by raids from the Swazi in the east and more worry-some the growing BaPedi in the north. Bongwe left KwaSimkulu and established a new capital for the Ndzundza at the base of the Bothasberg which was called "KwaMaza" (The Place of Ash) and proved to be a solid position with which to push the Pedi back northwards. Bongwe died without issue.
Sindeni	Son of Mrhetjha and brother to Bongwe's father Magobholi.
Mahlangu	The grandson of Sindeni. It is not clear how power was transferred from Sindeni to Mahlangu without Mahlangu's father. Mahlangu attempted to expand the Ndzundza territory both to the north and south but had limited success against the Swazi and Pedi but gained significant notoriety from his enemies as a skilled military leader.
Phaswana	Son of Mahlangu. Killed without issue.
Maridili	Son of Mahlangu. Killed without issue.
Mdalanyana	Son of Mahlangu. Killed without issue.
Mgwezana	Son of Mahlangu. Killed without issue.
Dzela ‡	Son of Mahlangu. Served as regent for the son of Mgwezana.
Mrhabuli Srudla	Son of Mahlangu. Also spelled "Mxabului". After many wars with the expanding BaPedi in the north, which led to the death of Mrhabuli's father and uncles, Musi's iNamrhali were lost forever. Oral tradition is not clear on who was the last owner of the mystical iNamrhali.

=== Historical ===
Historical Manala rulers
Name	Dates	Notes
Sibindi	1817–1826	Son of Mdibane. Sibindi fled from KwaMnyamana to KoMjekejeke and was killed by the forces of Mzilikazi Khumalo.
Mvula	1826–1827	Son of Mdibane. Mvula was also killed by the forces of Mzilikazi Khumalo.
Mgibe	1827–1832	Son of Mdibane killed by the forces of Mzilikazi Khumalo.
Silamba	1832–1892	Son of Mdibane. Silamba was left to pick up the pieces of the Manala after Mzilikazi Khumalo's occupation. He ruled for 60 years and rebuilt what was left of Manala during which Voortrekkers had arrived north of the Vaal River and much Manala territory was lost.
Mdedlangeni	1892–1896	Son of Salimba. Like his father, Mbedlengani made great attempts to resist the expansion of The Transvaal Republic. Mdedlangeni died under mysterious circumstances.
Libangeni ‡	1896–unknown	Son of Salimba. Libangeni had come into great conflict with The Transvaal Republic and lived in exile. He served as regent for the son of Mbedlengani.
Mabhena II	unknown–1906	Son of Mbedlangeni. It is not known when Mabhena II ascended to the leadership of the Manala Ndebele but he returned from exile to Manala lands and died in 1906.
Mbhongo I	1906–1933	Son of Mabhena II.
Mbulawa	1933–1941	Son of Mbhongo I.
Makhosoke I	1941–1960	Son of Mbulawa.
Mbongo II	1960–1986	Son of Makhosoke I.
Enoch Mabhena (as Makhosoke II)	1986–2026	Son of Mbongo II. Makhosoke II married Lesotho princess Sekhothali Seeiso in October 2019.
Mkhutjwa Saul Mabhena	2026-	Son of Mbongo II. Younger brother of Makhosoke II who died without a legitimate heir.

Historical Ndzundza rulers
Name	Dates	Notes
Magodongo	1811–1827	Son of Mgwezana. Magodongo moved the Ndzundza capital from KwaMaza to eSikhunjini. After being attacked by Mzilikazi Khumalo, Magodongo was tortured and finally killed with some of his eldest sons.
Sibhoko ‡	1827–1835	Son of Magodongo. Served as regent until the coming of age of Magodongo's son. Sibhoko was allegedly killed after a dispute with a Sotho-Tswana Chief named Matlala north of Marblehall.
SoMdeyi ‡	1835–1840	Son of Magodongo. Served as regent until the coming of age of Magodongo's son. Was killed by a raiding party of Mzilikazi Khumalo.
Mabhoko I	1840–1865	Son of Magodongo. Mabhoko moved the Ndzundza capital from eSikhunjini to a new capital called eMrholeni which was near a cave complex called KoNomtjarhelo. In the years of Mabhoko's reign there developed considerable strain in between the Ndzundza Ndebele and The Transvaal Republic.
Mkhephuli	1865–1873	Son of Mabhoko I. Also called Soqaleni. Mkhephuli was known by the Afrikaans name Cornelis.
Rhobongo ‡	1873–1879	Son of Mabhoko I. Also spelled "Xobongo"Served as regent for Fene.
Nyabela ‡	1879–1902	Son of Mabhoko I. Served as regent for Fene. Nyabela lost a bitter war to The Transvaal Republic and is often cited as the last free leader of the Ndzundza.
Fene	1902–1921	Son of Mkhephuli. Also spelled Mfene. Fene bought the farm 'Welgelegen' 60 km (37 mi) north east of Pretoria and established what would become modern day KwaMhlanga.
Mayitjha	1921–1961	Son of Fene.
Mabusa Mabhoko II	1961–1992	Son of Mayitjha.
Nyumbabo Mayitjha II	1992–2005	Son of Mabusa Mabhoko II.
Sililo ‡	2005-2006	The son of Mhlahlwa who was a son of Mayitjha. Served as regent for Mabhoko III.
Mbusi Mahlangu (as Mabhoko III)	2006–present	Son of Nyumbabo Mayitjha II. Since ascending to the throne of the Ndzundza, Mabhoko III has contested the paramountcy of the Ndebele people. Mabhoko has lost several court bids to overturn the ruling by the Nhlapo Commission whose findings state Makhosoke II as the senior king of the Ndebele.

(‡ = Ruled as regent.)

== See also ==
- List of Xhosa people
- List of South Africans
- List of Southern Ndebele people
- List of Zulu people
- List of South African office-holders

== Sources ==
- "DETERMINATION ON MANALA-MBONGO AND NDZUNDZAMABHOKO PARAMOUNTCIES" (PDF). Southern African Government.
- Peires, J (22 October 2014). "History versus customary law: Commission on Traditional Leadership: Disputes and Claims". South African Crime Quarterly. 49 (1): 7. doi:10.4314/sacq.v49i1.1. ISSN 1991-3877.
- "Vol. 16 No. 1 (1986)". Scientia Militaria: South African Journal of Military Studies.
- Transvaal Native Affairs Department (1968). Short history of the Native tribes of the Transvaal. Pretoria: State Library.
