= Magalieskruin =

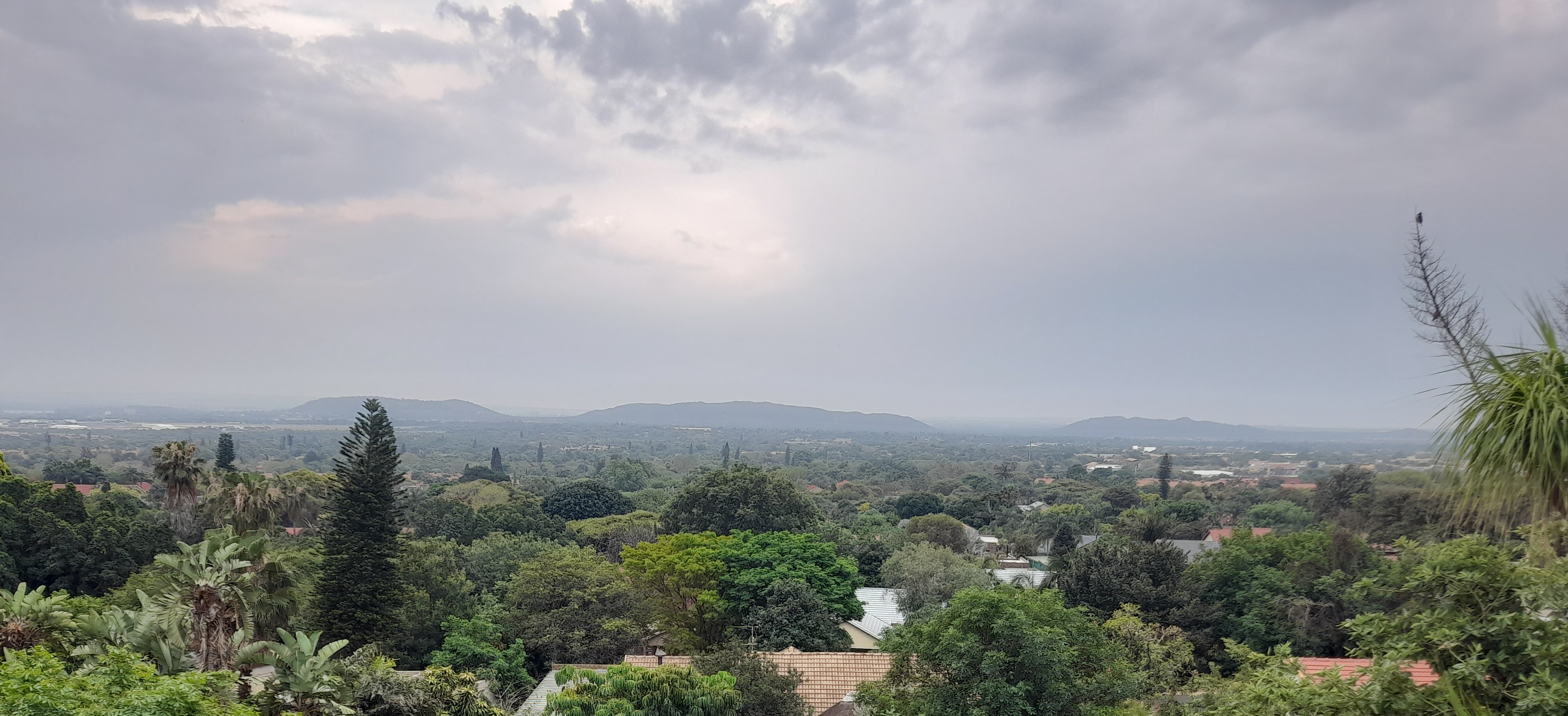
- Magalieskruin seen from the Magaliesberg Mountains

- Location within Gauteng Location within South Africa Location within Africa
- Coordinates: 25°44′46″S 28°11′17″E
- Country: South Africa
- Province: Gauteng
- Municipality: City of Tshwane
- Main Place: Pretoria
- Named for: Magaliesberg

Area
  - Land: 5.28 km^{2} (2.04 sq mi)

Population (2011)
  - Total: 5,923

Racial Makeup (2011)
  - White: 84,52%
  - Black African: 13,35%
  - Indian or Asian: 0,96%
  - Others: 1,16%

First Language (2011)
  - Afrikaans: 77,39%
  - English Language: 12,18%
  - Setswana: 2,34%
  - Other: 8,09%
- Time zone: UTC+2

Magalieskruin is a suburb located in the northern part of Pretoria. The suburb is mostly located on the Magaliesberg and entirely south of Sefako Makgato Drive (R513). It is bordered by Montana Park to the east and Wonderboom to the west.

Magalieskruin is home to Laerskool Magalieskruin, a primary school founded in the 1980s.
