= Wolvenkop =

- Location within Mpumalanga Location within South Africa
- Coordinates: 25.519°S 28.993°E
- Country: South Africa
- Province: Mpumalanga
- District: Nkangala
- Municipality: Thembisile Hani

Area
  - Total: 1.34 km^{2} (0.52 sq mi)

Population (2001)
  - Total: 2,161
  - Density: 1,610/km^{2} (4,180/sq mi)

Racial makeup (2001)
  - Black African: 100.0%

First languages (2001)
  - Southern Ndebele: 59.1%
  - Zulu: 18.6%
  - Northern Sotho: 7.3%
  - Swazi: 5.9%
  - Other: 9.1%
- Time zone: UTC+2 (SAST)

Wolvenkop is a town in Nkangala District Municipality in the Mpumalanga province of South Africa.
