= Boekenhouthoek =

- Location within Mpumalanga Location within South Africa
- Coordinates: 25.303°S 29.015°E
- Country: South Africa
- Province: Mpumalanga
- District: Nkangala
- Municipality: Thembisile Hani
- Main Place: Mkobola

Area
  - Total: 5.99 km^{2} (2.31 sq mi)

Population (2011)
  - Total: 9,166
  - Density: 1,530/km^{2} (3,960/sq mi)

Racial makeup (2011)
  - Black African: 99.7%
  - Indian/Asian: 0.1%
  - White: 0.0%
  - Other: 0.1%

First languages (2011)
  - Southern Ndebele: 61.3%
  - Zulu: 16.5%
  - Northern Sotho: 6.6%
  - Swazi: 5.0%
  - Other: 10.5%
- Time zone: UTC+2 (SAST)

Boekenhouthoek is a small village situated in the Mpumalanga province of South Africa, it falls under the Nkangala District Municipality.
