= Mathys Zyn Loop =

- Location within Mpumalanga Location within South Africa
- Coordinates: 25.281°S 28.990°E
- Country: South Africa
- Province: Mpumalanga
- District: Nkangala
- Municipality: Thembisile Hani

Area
  - Total: 2.20 km^{2} (0.85 sq mi)

Population (2011)
  - Total: 4,907
  - Density: 2,230/km^{2} (5,780/sq mi)

Racial makeup (2011)
  - Black African: 99.2%
  - Coloured: 0.2%
  - Indian/Asian: 0.1%
  - White: 0.1%
  - Other: 0.3%

First languages (2011)
  - S. Ndebele: 65.2%
  - Zulu: 10.2%
  - Northern Sotho: 7.8%
  - Sotho: 6.1%
  - Other: 10.7%
- Time zone: UTC+2 (SAST)

Mathys Zyn Loop is a town in Nkangala District Municipality in the Mpumalanga province of South Africa.
