= Jarovnice =

- Municipality
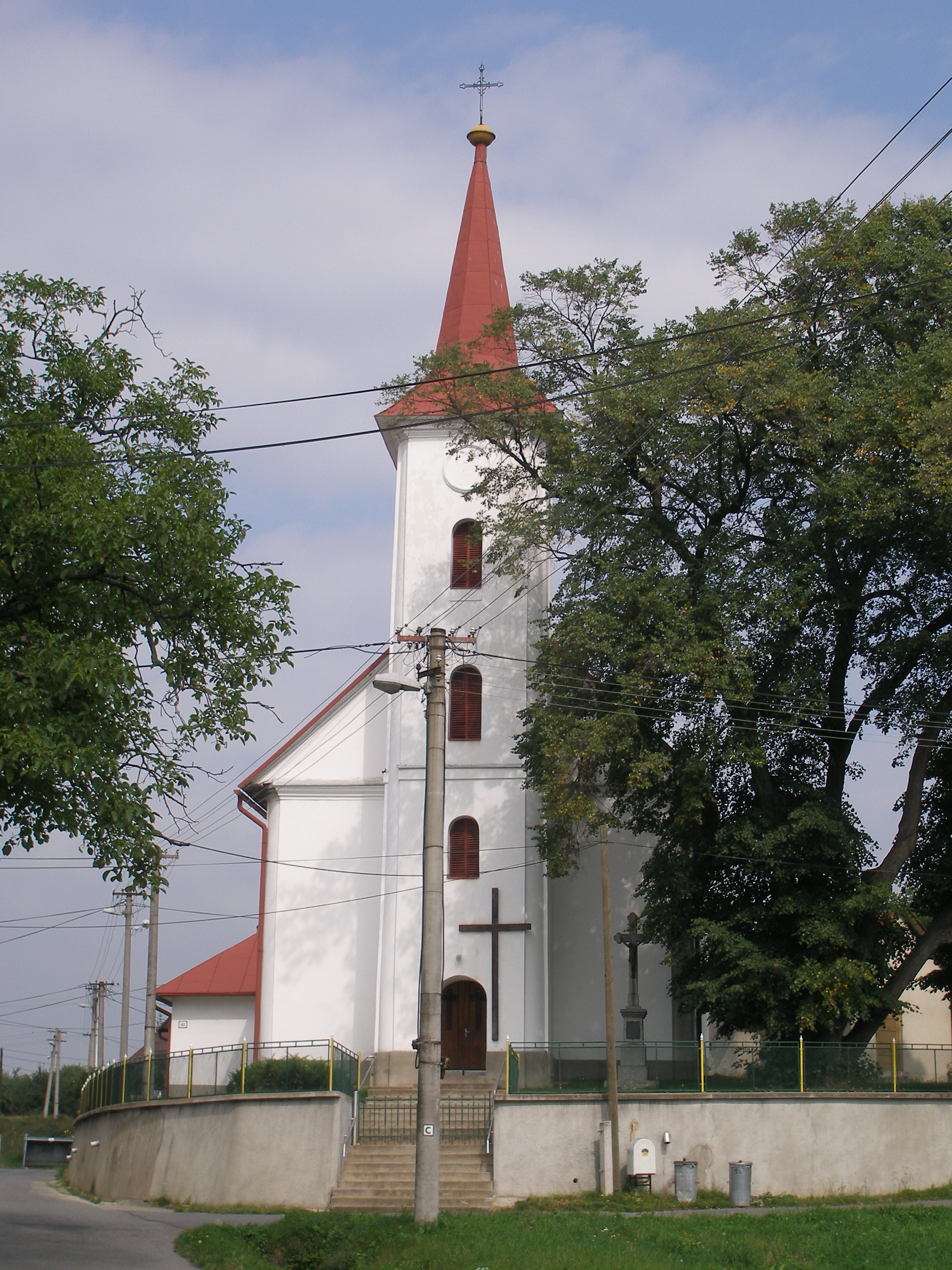

- Flag

- Location of Jarovnice in the Prešov Region Location of Jarovnice in Slovakia
- Coordinates: 49.05°N 21.07°E
- Country: Slovakia
- Region: Prešov Region
- District: Sabinov District
- First mentioned: 1260

Government
  - Mayor: Florián Giňa

Area
  - Total: 20.17 km^{2} (7.79 sq mi)
- Elevation: 422 m (1,385 ft)

Population (2025)
  - Total: 8,536
- Time zone: UTC+1 (CET)
  - Summer (DST): UTC+2 (CEST)
- Postal code: 826 3
- Area code: +421 51
- Vehicle registration plate (until 2022): SB
- Website: www.jarovnice.sk

Jarovnice (German: Jarownitz; Hungarian: Jernye) is a village and municipality in Sabinov District in the Prešov Region of north-eastern Slovakia.

== History ==
In historical records, the village was first mentioned in 1260.

Heavy rains on 20 July 1998 brought about the worst floods in Slovak history, changing otherwise quiet rivers in eastern Slovakia into a lethal force. The wild, overflowing water rushed from the river bed, sweeping over and engulfing everything in its path. The tragic results of these destructive floods were 63 dead, over 3,000 people evacuated from their homes, and two thousand houses destroyed in dozens of communities.

== Geography ==
The municipality lies at an altitude of 422 metres (1,385 ft) and covers an area of 20.17 km^{2} (7.79 sq mi) (2025).

== Population ==
Population statistic (10 years)
Year	1995	2005	2015	2025
Count	3456	4708	6290	8536
Difference		+36.22%	+33.60%	+35.70%

Population statistic
Year	2024	2025
Count	8261	8536
Difference		+3.32%

It has a population of 8536 people (31 December 2025).

=== Ethnicity ===
Census 2021 (1+ %)
Ethnicity	Number	Fraction
Slovak	6179	85.33%
Romani	5372	74.18%
Not found out	733	10.12%
Total	7241	

In year 2021 was 7241 people by ethnicity 6179 as Slovak, 5372 as Romani, 733 as Not found out, 10 as Hungarian, 9 as Rusyn, 7 as Czech, 6 as Other, 1 as Italian, 1 as Polish and 1 as English.

Note on population: The difference values of population numbers in the table "Population statistic" and in the sections "Ethnicity" & "Religion" is caused by the use of various statistical methods.

The vast majority of the municipality's population consists of the local Roma community. In 2019, they numbered 6900 and constituted an estimated 88% of the local population. The municipality has the largest Roma population in the country according to the 2021 census data as well.

=== Religion ===
Census 2021 (1+ %)
Religion	Number	Fraction
Roman Catholic Church	6364	87.89%
Not found out	581	8.02%
None	121	1.67%
Apostolic Church	115	1.59%
Total	7241	

In year 2021 was 7241 people by religion 6364 from Roman Catholic Church, 581 from Not found out, 121 from None, 115 from Apostolic Church, 30 from Greek Catholic Church, 13 from Evangelical Church, 7 from Christian Congregations in Slovakia, 5 from Calvinist Church, 2 from Ad hoc movements, 1 from Paganism and natural spirituality, 1 from New Apostolic Church and 1 from United Methodist Church.

Top 3 Slovak municipalities by Romani population, 2021 Census
City	Population
Jarovnice	4,176(57.67%)
Luník IX	3,073(43.67%)
Rakúsy	2,248(70.76%)

== See also ==
- List of municipalities and towns in Slovakia

== Genealogical resources ==
The records for genealogical research are available at the state archive "Statny Archiv in Presov, Slovakia"

- Roman Catholic church records (births/marriages/deaths): 1750-1896 (parish A)
- Greek Catholic church records (births/marriages/deaths): 1834-1895 (parish B)
