= Witfontein =

- Location within Limpopo Location within South Africa
- Coordinates: 25.234°S 29.040°E
- Country: South Africa
- Province: Limpopo
- District: Sekhukhune
- Municipality: Elias Motsoaledi

Area
  - Total: 1.78 km^{2} (0.69 sq mi)

Population (2011)
  - Total: 2,832
  - Density: 1,590/km^{2} (4,120/sq mi)

Racial makeup (2011)
  - Black African: 99.9%
  - Indian/Asian: 0.1%
  - Other: 0.1%

First languages (2011)
  - Northern Sotho: 45.2%
  - S. Ndebele: 34.6%
  - Zulu: 8.3%
  - Swazi: 3.1%
  - Other: 8.8%
- Time zone: UTC+2 (SAST)
- Postal code (street): 0477
- 0477PO box: 0477

Witfontein is a town in Sekhukhune District Municipality in the Limpopo province of South Africa.
