= Siyabuswa =

- Location within Mpumalanga Location within South Africa
- Coordinates: 25°7′S 29°3′E
- Country: South Africa
- Province: Mpumalanga
- District: Nkangala
- Municipality: Dr JS Moroka

Area
  - Total: 14.88 km^{2} (5.75 sq mi)

Population (2011)
  - Total: 36,882
  - Density: 2,479/km^{2} (6,420/sq mi)

Racial makeup (2011)
  - Black African: 99.5%
  - Coloured: 0.1%
  - Indian/Asian: 0.3%
  - Other: 0.1%

First languages (2011)
  - S. Ndebele: 71.2%
  - Northern Sotho: 11.3%
  - Zulu: 6.7%
  - Sotho: 2.9%
  - Other: 7.9%
- Time zone: UTC+2 (SAST)
- Postal code (street): 0472
- PO box: 0472
- Area code: 013

Siyabuswa is a township in South Africa in the province of Mpumalanga (a region formerly called Eastern Transvaal). During the Apartheid era, Siyabuswa was the capital of the KwaNdebele Bantustan. It served as a capital from 1981 to 1986 when KwaMhlanga replaced it. Most of its inhabitants (population in 2011: 36,882) are members of the Ndebele ethnic group. Currently, Siyabuswa is home to several ethnic groups, namely the Ndebele, Pedi and Sotho people.

== Transport ==
The town is about 20 kilometers southwest of the Marble Hall airport. The R573 regional route (also known as the Moloto road) that links Pretoria and KwaMhlanga with Marble Hall passes through Siyabuswa.

== See also ==
- KwaMhlanga
- Moloto, falling under Gauteng.
- Marble Hall
- Vaalbank
