= Kwaggafontein =

Human settlement in South Africa

- Ekukhanyeni
- Location within Mpumalanga Location within South Africa
- Coordinates: 25.3075°S 28.9469°E
- Country: South Africa
- Province: Mpumalanga
- District: Nkangala
- Municipality: Thembisile Hani

Area
  - Total: 17.84 km^{2} (6.89 sq mi)

Population (2011)
  - Total: 45,104

Racial makeup (2011)
  - Black African: 98.9%
  - Indian/Asian: 0.54%
  - Coloured: 0.32%
  - White: 0.09%
  - Other: 0.15%

First languages (2011)
  - S. Ndebele: 69.89%
  - Zulu: 13.4%
  - Northern Sotho: 4.01%
  - Sotho: 3.10%
  - Other: 9.6%
- Time zone: UTC+2 (SAST)
- Postal code (street): 0458

Kwaggafontein, officially Ekukhanyeni, is a town along the Moloto Road (R573) in the Thembisile Hani Local Municipality of the Nkangala District Municipality, which is located in the Mpumalanga province of South Africa. It was established in the late 1940s by the AmaNdebele tribe of South Africa. The Ndebele people who currently occupy the town came from nearby farms that are today in the Mpumalanga and Gauteng provinces. Many people came from current day Bronkhorstspruit, Delmas, Balmoral and other surrounding areas.

It is a modern, civilised area consisting of schools, Kwagga Mall (formerly Kwagga Plaza), and a market. There is also a Marble Mine nearby currently producing limestones as concrete crushed slabs currently operating around the clock.

== Nomenclature ==
The place gets its name from the extinct quagga animal. The area was once a farm for quaggas (zebra and donkey breeds). It is also called Mkobola by the locals.
