= Rakúsy =

- Municipality
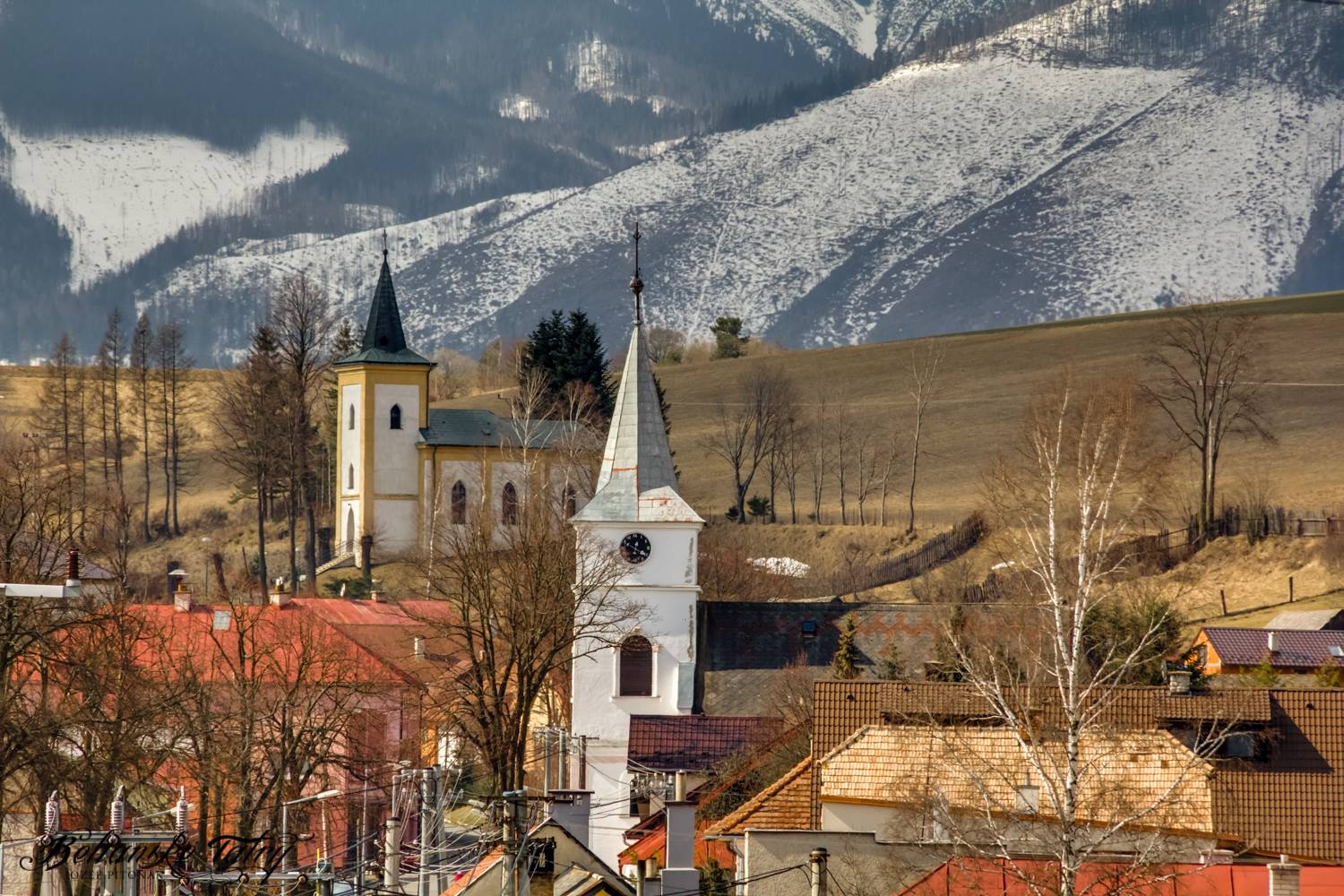

- Flag

- Location of Rakúsy in the Prešov Region Location of Rakúsy in Slovakia
- Coordinates: 49.19°N 20.38°E
- Country: Slovakia
- Region: Prešov Region
- District: Kežmarok District
- First mentioned: 1288

Area
  - Total: 6.34 km^{2} (2.45 sq mi)
- Elevation: 676 m (2,218 ft)

Population (2025)
  - Total: 3,601
- Time zone: UTC+1 (CET)
  - Summer (DST): UTC+2 (CEST)
- Postal code: 597 6
- Area code: +421 52
- Vehicle registration plate (until 2022): KK
- Website: www.rakusy.sk

Rakúsy (Hungarian: Rókus, German: Roks, Rusyn: Ракусі) is a village and municipality in Kežmarok District in the Prešov Region of north Slovakia.

== Geography ==
The municipality lies at an altitude of 676 metres (2,218 ft) and covers an area of 6.34 km^{2} (2.45 sq mi) (2025).

== History ==
In historical records the village was first mentioned in 1288. It belonged to a German language island. Before the establishment of independent Czechoslovakia in 1918, Rakúsy was part of Szepes County within the Kingdom of Hungary. From 1939 to 1945, it was part of the Slovak Republic. On 27 January 1945, the Red Army dislodged the Wehrmacht from Rakúsy in the course of the Western Carpathian offensive and it was once again part of Czechoslovakia. The German population was expelled in 1945.

== Population ==
Population statistic (10 years)
Year	1995	2005	2015	2025
Count	1531	2200	3111	3601
Difference		+43.69%	+41.40%	+15.75%

Population statistic
Year	2024	2025
Count	3512	3601
Difference		+2.53%

It has a population of 3601 people (31 December 2025).

=== Ethnicity ===
Census 2021 (1+ %)
Ethnicity	Number	Fraction
Romani	2365	74.44%
Slovak	879	27.66%
Not found out	93	2.92%
Total	3177	

In year 2021 was 3177 people by ethnicity 2365 as Romani, 879 as Slovak, 93 as Not found out, 3 as Rusyn, 3 as German and 2 as Other.

Note on population: The difference values of population numbers in the table "Population statistic" and in the sections "Ethnicity" & "Religion" is caused by the use of various statistical methods.

The vast majority of the municipality's population consists of the local Roma community. In 2019, they constituted an estimated 76% of the local population.

=== Religion ===
Census 2021 (1+ %)
Religion	Number	Fraction
Roman Catholic Church	2813	88.54%
None	124	3.9%
Seventh-day Adventist Church	109	3.43%
Not found out	55	1.73%
Total	3177	

In year 2021 was 3177 people by religion 2813 from Roman Catholic Church, 124 from None, 109 from Seventh-day Adventist Church, 55 from Not found out, 28 from Christian Congregations in Slovakia, 18 from Evangelical Church, 17 from Greek Catholic Church, 5 from Calvinist Church, 2 from Eastern Orthodox Church, 2 from United Methodist Church, 1 from Old Catholic Church, 1 from Other, 1 from Church of the Brethren and 1 from Apostolic Church.

According to 2021 census total population has been 3,177. There are 1,662 males and 1,515 females living here.

Rakúsy houses one of the largest communities of Romani people in Slovakia. According to the Atlas of Roma Communities 2019 research, they number 3,085 which constitutes 76% of the local population.

Top 3 Slovak municipalities by Romani population, 2021 Census
City	Population
Jarovnice	4,176(57.67%)
Luník IX	3,073(43.67%)
Rakúsy	2,248(70.76%)
