= Klipfontein, Mpumalanga =

Klipfontein
- Location within Mpumalanga Location within South Africa
- Coordinates: 25.388°S 28.846°E
- Country: South Africa
- Province: Mpumalanga
- District: Nkangala
- Municipality: Thembisile

Area
  - Total: 0.39 km^{2} (0.15 sq mi)

Population (2001)
  - Total: 601
  - Density: 1,500/km^{2} (4,000/sq mi)
- Time zone: UTC+2 (SAST)
- Postal code (street): 1034
- PO box: 1034

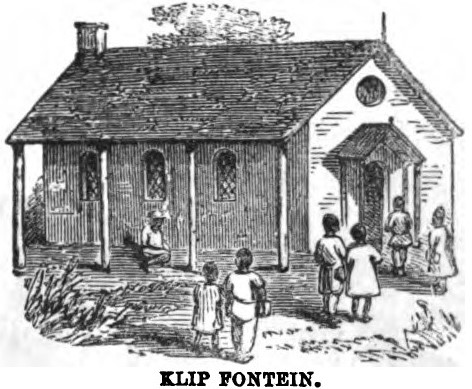
Klip Fontein Chapel, Southern Africa (p.125, August 1865, XXII)

Klipfontein is a town in Nkangala District Municipality in the Mpumalanga province of South Africa.
