= Montana Park =

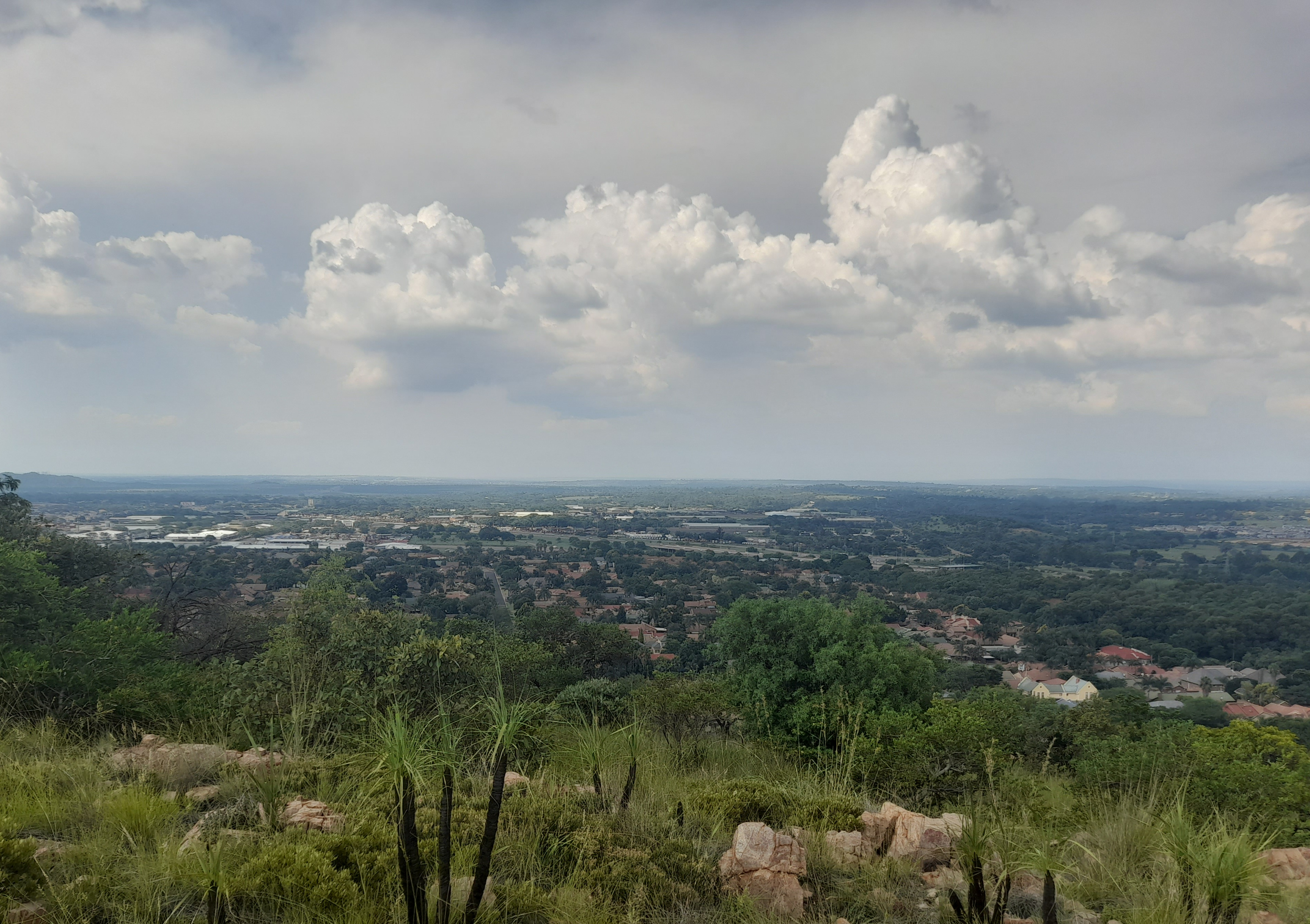
- Montana Park seen from the Magaliesberg Mountains

- Location within Gauteng Location within South Africa
- Coordinates: 25.6876°S 28.2721°E
- Country: South Africa
- Province: Gauteng
- Municipality: City of Tshwane
- Main Place: Pretoria

Area
  - Total: 3.40 km^{2} (1.31 sq mi)

Population (2011)
  - Total: 6,570
  - Density: 1,930/km^{2} (5,000/sq mi)

Racial makeup (2011)
  - White: 78%
  - Coloured: 1.9%
  - Indian/Asian: 0.9%
  - Black African: 19%
  - Other: 0.9%

First languages (2011)
  - Afrikaans: 73.8%
  - English: 10.8%
  - Setswana: 4.2%
  - Sepedi: 3.0%
  - Other: 31.6%
- Time zone: UTC+2 (SAST)
- Postal code (street): 0182
- PO box: 0159
- Website: http://

Montana Park is a residential suburb of Pretoria in Gauteng, South Africa. It is situated to the north-east of the Pretoria CBD.

Over the recent years (~2005 to 2015), Montana has experienced a considerable influx of Africans. As of November 2019, the official language in the area can be said to be English, followed by both Setswana and Afrikaans. The racial mix is neutralising fairly well.

The average family heads in the suburb are predominantly middle age and upper working class. Many houses are three bedrooms with fairly average stand sizes suitable for city living. The main road in the area is Sefako Makgatho Drive (R513), previously known as Zambesi Drive.

The majority of the residents in the area are government professionals.
