= KwaMhlanga =

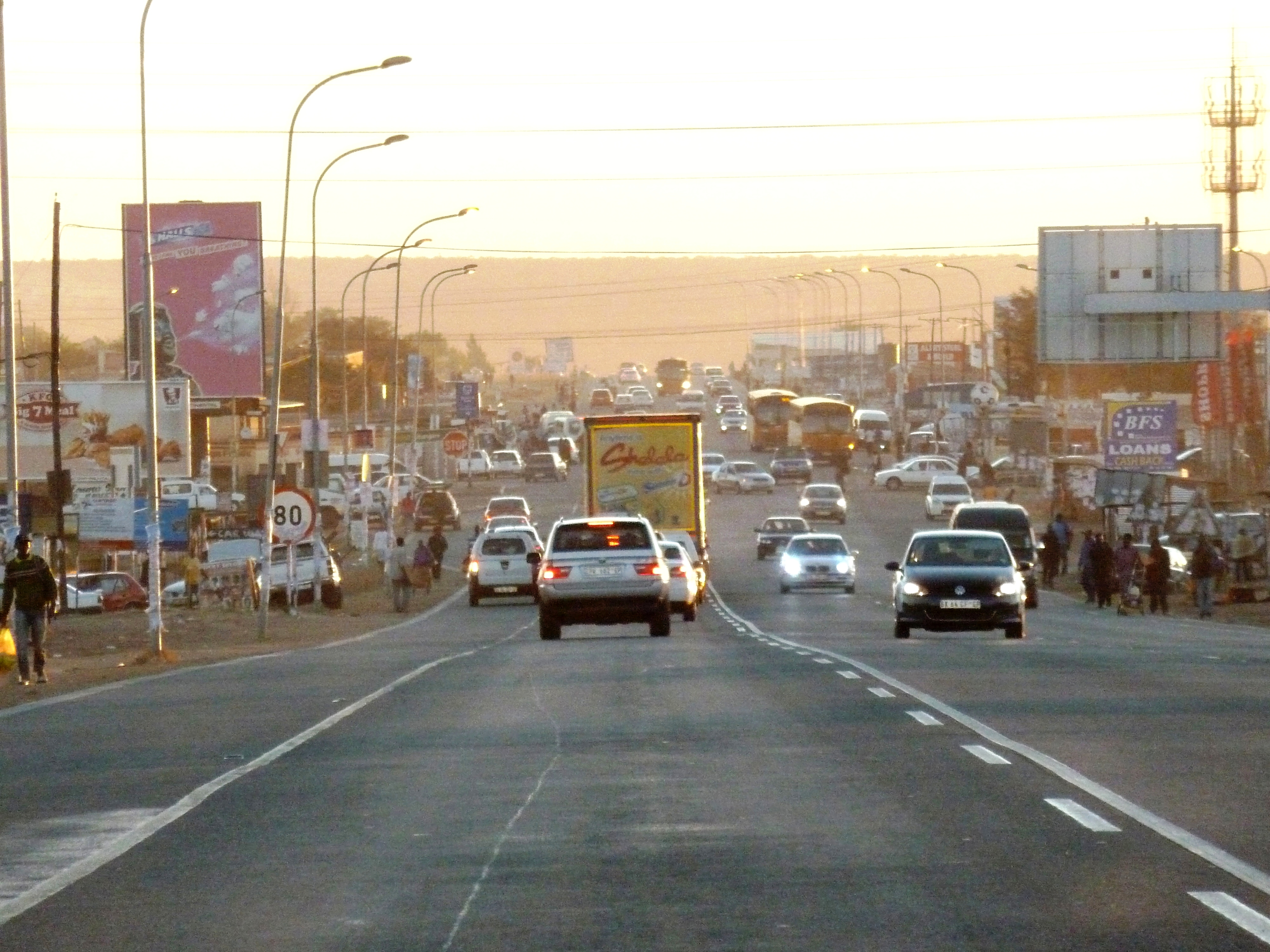
- KwaMhlanga Crossroads

- Location within Mpumalanga Location within South Africa
- Coordinates: 25.432°S 28.708°E
- Country: South Africa
- Province: Mpumalanga
- District: Nkangala
- Municipality: Thembisile Hani

Area
  - Total: 6.92 km^{2} (2.67 sq mi)
- Elevation: 1,325 m (4,347 ft)

Population (2021)
  - Total: 69,853

Racial makeup (2011)
  - Black African: 99.0%
  - Coloured: 0.4%
  - Indian/Asian: 0.4%
  - White: 0.2%

First languages (2011)
  - S. Ndebele: 50.0%
  - Northern Sotho: 19.7%
  - Zulu: 10.9%
  - Sotho: 5.4%
  - Other: 14.1%
- Time zone: UTC+2 (SAST)
- Postal code (street): 1022
- PO box: 1022
- Area code: 013

KwaMhlanga is a town in the Nkangala district municipality of the Mpumalanga province in South Africa. It is the spiritual home of the Ndebele tribe that settled here in the early 18th century.

KwaMhlanga is 73 km or an hour's drive from the country’s capital, Pretoria on the R573 road.

This town developed into the administrative centre for the local government, and now houses the government administration for the North Western Region of the Mpumalanga Province.

To the north of KwaMhlanga, on the R568 road near the village of Klipfontein, is located the Manala Royal Kraal; the Ndzundza Mabhoko Royal Kraal is situated further north at Weltevreden. By special arrangement, both of these kraals can be visited by small groups.

== Sport ==
The National First Division team Casric Stars are based in KwaMhlanga, playing their home games at the Solomon Mahlangu Stadium.

== Incidents ==
On 18 February 2025, Aserie Ndlovu, a journalist, and his partner, Zodwa Mdhluli were kidnapped and killed. Their bodies were found in May 2025 outside Rust De Winter Nature Reserve.

== See also ==
- KwaNdebele
- Siyabuswa
- Vaalbank
