= Kameeldrift =

- Location within Gauteng Location within South Africa
- Coordinates: 25.6383°S 28.3073°E
- Country: South Africa
- Province: Gauteng
- Municipality: City of Tshwane

Area
  - Total: 32.76 km^{2} (12.65 sq mi)

Population (2011)
  - Total: 6,727
  - Density: 205.3/km^{2} (531.8/sq mi)

Racial makeup (2011)
  - Black African: 68.5%
  - Coloured: 0.6%
  - Indian/Asian: 0.1%
  - White: 30.5%
  - Other: 0.4%

First languages (2011)
  - Northern Sotho: 29.1%
  - Afrikaans: 27.9%
  - S. Ndebele: 8.2%
  - Tsonga: 7.3%
  - Other: 27.5%
- Time zone: UTC+2 (SAST)

Kameeldrift is a suburb / farming area of Pretoria. It is located 20 km north east of Pretoria CBD, west of the Roodeplaat Dam. The center of this small community is the primary school, named Kameeldrift Laerskool.

== Sectors ==
The Kameeldrift Police Precinct consists of 5 sectors: Sector 1

- Downbern
- Wallmanstahl
- Paardefontein

Sector 2A

- Rynoue
- Buffelsdrift
- Kameeldrift

Sector 2B

- Pumulani
- Walmaranspoort
- Derdepoort

Sector 2C

- Zeekoegat
- Roodeplaat
- Kameeldrift

Sector 3/4

- Leeuwfontein
- Baviaanspoort
- Kameelfontein
