= Thembisile Hani Local Municipality =

Thembisile Hani
- Local municipality
- Seal

- Location in Mpumalanga
- Coordinates: 25°30′S 28°55′E
- Country: South Africa
- Province: Mpumalanga
- District: Nkangala
- Seat: eMpumalanga
- Wards: 32

Government
  - Type: Municipal council
  - Mayor: Cllr L.J Dikgale (ANC)
  - Municipal Manager: Mr. DJD Mahlangu

Area
  - Total: 2,384 km^{2} (920 sq mi)

Population (2011)
  - Total: 310,458
  - Density: 130.2/km^{2} (337.3/sq mi)

Racial makeup (2011)
  - Black African: 99.2%
  - Coloured: 0.2%
  - Indian/Asian: 0.3%
  - White: 0.1%

First languages (2011)
  - Southern Ndebele: 58.5%
  - Northern Sotho: 12.6%
  - Zulu: 12.5%
  - Sotho: 4.8%
  - Other: 11.6%
- Time zone: UTC+2 (SAST)
- Municipal code: MP315

Thembisile Hani Municipality (Southern Ndebele: UMasipaladi weThembisile Hani; Northern Sotho: Mmasepala wa Thembisile Hani; Zulu: UMasipala iThembisile Hani) is a local municipality within the Nkangala District Municipality, in the Mpumalanga province of South Africa. It is a semi-urban local municipality consisting of 57 villages within which there are 5 established townships.

The municipality is named after Thembisile Chris Hani, the Secretary General of the South African Communist Party, who was assassinated on 10 April 1993. Flare fm SA is a popular local successful radio station based in KwaMhlanga in the Thembisile Hani Local Municipality

== Main places ==
The 2001 census divided the municipality into the following main places:

| Place | Code | Area (km^{2}) | Population | Most spoken language |
|---|---|---|---|---|
| Ekangala | 81201 | 5.61 | 1,509 | Zulu |
| KwaMhlanga Part 1 | 81202 | 254.72 | 71,756 | Southern Ndebele |
| KwaMhlanga Part 2 | 81215 | 5.91 | 6,085 | Southern Ndebele |
| Mabusa National Park | 81203 | 100.64 | 99 | Sotho |
| Mkobola | 81204 | 320.15 | 107,560 | Southern Ndebele |
| Moutse 3 | 81205 | 1.68 | 1,788 | Northern Sotho |
| Sokhulumi | 81206 | 0.33 | 610 | Southern Ndebele |
| Thokoza | 81208 | 2.27 | 4,459 | Southern Ndebele |
| Tweefontein North | 81210 | 12.07 | 30000 | Southern Ndebele |
| Tweefontein South | 81211 | 13.91 | 24,407 | Southern Ndebele |
| Tweefontein | 81209 | 23.26 | 45 | Northern Sotho |
| Vezubuhle | 81212 | 5.26 | 10,399 | Southern Ndebele |
| Vlakfontein | 81213 | 0.76 | 548 | Southern Ndebele |
| Wolvenkop | 81214 | 1.34 | 2,161 | Southern Ndebele |
| Remainder of the municipality | 81207 | 1,761.83 | 6,704 | Southern Ndebel |

== Politics ==
The municipal council consists of sixty-four members elected by mixed-member proportional representation. Thirty-two are elected by first-past-the-post voting in thirty-two wards, while the remaining thirty-two are chosen from party lists so that the total number of party representatives is proportional to the number of votes received. In the election of 1 November 2021 the African National Congress (ANC) won a majority of forty seats on the council.

The following table shows the results of the election.

| Party | Ward | | | List | | | Total seats |
| Party | Votes | % | Seats | Votes | % | Seats | Total seats |
|---|---|---|---|---|---|---|---|
| African National Congress | 36,509 | 60.58 | 30 | 37,469 | 62.68 | 10 | 40 |
| Economic Freedom Fighters | 10,274 | 17.05 | 0 | 11,639 | 19.47 | 12 | 12 |
| Democratic Alliance | 3,355 | 5.57 | 0 | 3,509 | 5.87 | 4 | 4 |
| African Independent People's Organisation | 2,326 | 3.86 | 0 | 2,429 | 4.06 | 3 | 3 |
| Independent candidates | 4,404 | 7.31 | 2 | | | | 2 |
| Sindawonye Progressive Party | 873 | 1.45 | 0 | 1,024 | 1.71 | 1 | 1 |
| Ingubo Yeskhethu Party | 641 | 1.06 | 0 | 990 | 1.66 | 1 | 1 |
| African Transformation Movement | 477 | 0.79 | 0 | 409 | 0.68 | 1 | 1 |
| 8 other parties | 1,404 | 2.33 | 0 | 2,309 | 3.86 | 0 | 0 |
| Total | 60,263 | 100.00 | 32 | 59,778 | 100.00 | 32 | 64 |
| Valid votes | 60,263 | 97.68 | | 59,778 | 97.38 | | |
| Invalid/blank votes | 1,432 | 2.32 | | 1,611 | 2.62 | | |
| Total votes | 61,695 | 100.00 | | 61,389 | 100.00 | | |
| Registered voters/turnout | 151,479 | 40.73 | | 151,479 | 40.53 | | |
