= Marble Hall =

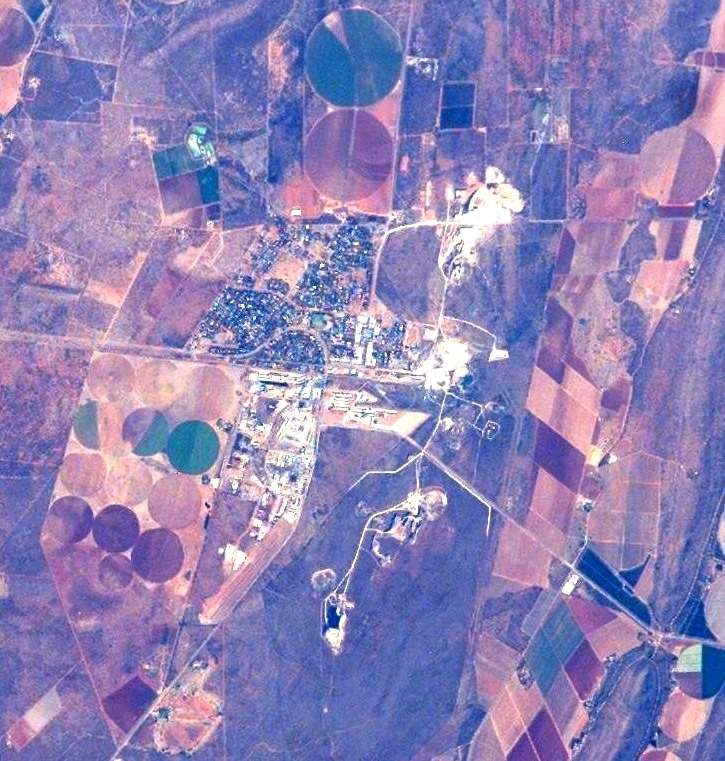
- Satellite image of Marble Hall (2003)

- Location within Limpopo Location within South Africa Location within Africa
- Coordinates: 24°58′00″S 29°17′20″E
- Country: South Africa
- Province: Limpopo
- District: Sekhukhune
- Municipality: Ephraim Mogale

Area
  - Total: 16.49 km^{2} (6.37 sq mi)
- Elevation: 910 m (2,990 ft)

Population (2011)
  - Total: 2,687
  - Density: 162.9/km^{2} (422.0/sq mi)

Racial makeup (2011)
  - Black African: 59.1%
  - Coloured: 0.7%
  - Indian/Asian: 4.6%
  - White: 34.5%
  - Other: 1.2%

First languages (2011)
  - Afrikaans: 35.1%
  - Sepedi: 50.6%
  - English: 12.0%
  - Tsonga: 4.3%
  - Other: 18.0%
- Time zone: UTC+2 (SAST)
- Postal code (street): 0450
- PO box: 0450
- Area code: 013

Marble Hall is a town in the south of the Limpopo province of South Africa. It was formerly in Mpumalanga province.

Marble Hall is a village 26 km north-west of Groblersdal and 96 km south-south-east of Mokopane on the N11 national route. Laid out in 1942 and proclaimed a township in January 1945, it owes its development to the Marble Lime Mine. Its name is said to be an adaptation of ‘marble hole’, where fifteen varieties of marble occur.

== History ==
While on a hunting expedition from Bethlehem, Matthew Greeff and his dog discovered a hole containing marble in 1920. In 1929, the Marble Lime Company came in to work on the deposits and then, in 1942, a town was developed and known as Materhol (Afrikaans for Matthews Hole). Soon, the town's name was changed to Marble Hall.

== See also ==
- Groblersdal
- Siyabuswa
