= Ekangala =

- Location within Gauteng Location within South Africa
- Coordinates: 25.680°S 28.738°E
- Country: South Africa
- Province: Gauteng
- Municipality: City of Tshwane

Area
  - Total: 46.05 km^{2} (17.78 sq mi)

Population (2011)
  - Total: 54,332
  - Density: 1,180/km^{2} (3,056/sq mi)

Racial makeup (2011)
  - Black African: 99.0%
  - Coloured: 0.3%
  - Indian/Asian: 0.3%
  - Other: 0.3%

First languages (2011)
  - Zulu: 33.4%
  - S. Ndebele: 28.6%
  - Northern Sotho: 15.2%
  - Sotho: 5.8%
  - Other: 17.0%
- Time zone: UTC+2 (SAST)
- Postal code (street): 1021
- PO box: 1021

Ekangala is a large township falling under the City of Tshwane in the Gauteng province of South Africa. It lies remotely in Gauteng, tucked into the border with Mpumalanga to the east.
