= M22 (Pretoria) =

Road in Pretoria

Metropolitan route M22

Route information
- Maintained by City of Tshwane Metropolitan Municipality
- Length: 18.2 km (11.3 mi)

Major junctions
- South-West end: R55 near Pretoria Industrial
- M7 in Proclamation Hill; M2 in Proclamation Hill; R104 in Pretoria West; R104 / M1 in Pretoria CBD; M4 in Marabastad; M1 in Marabastad; R101 / M18 in Pretoria CBD; M5 in Prinshof; M29 in Rietondale; M7 in Queenswood
- North-East end: M8 at Queenswood

Location
- Country: South Africa

Highway system
- Numbered routes of South Africa
← M21	→ M23

The M22 road is a metropolitan route in the City of Tshwane in Gauteng, South Africa. It connects Pretoria Industrial with Queenswood via Proclamation Hill, Pretoria West, Pretoria CBD and Rietondale.

It is an alternative route to the M7 route for travel between Proclamation Hill and Queenswood.

== Route ==
The M22 route begins at a junction with the R55 route (Quagga Road; Transoranje Road) just south of Proclamation Hill and north of Pretoria Industrial. It starts by heading north-east as a dual carriageway named Quagga Road, forming the eastern boundary of the Proclamation Hill suburb and meeting the western termini of the M7 route (which connects to Fountains Valley) and the M2 route (which connects to Arcadia).

After the M2 junction, the M22 proceeds to reach a junction with the R104 route (WF Nkomo Street) south of the Quagga Shopping Centre. The M22 joins the R104 and they are one road eastwards as WF Nkomo Street through Pretoria West up to the junction with the M1 route (Es'kia Mphahlele Drive). The M22 leaves WF Nkomo Street (R104) and becomes one road with the M1 northwards on Es'kia Mphahlele Drive.

At the next junction in Marabastad, the M1/M22 meets the M4 route (Johannes Ramokhoase Street; Struben Street; Vom Hagen Street). At the next junction after Vom Hagen Street, the M22 leaves Es'kia Mphahlele Drive (M1) and becomes its own road eastwards as two one-way streets (Boom Street eastwards from the M1 and Bloed Street westwards to the M1).

From the M1 junction, the M22 heads eastwards through Marabastad and the northern area of the Pretoria CBD to meet the R101 route (Kgosi Mampuru Street; Schubart Street). Here, the R101 joins the M22 eastwards on the two one-way streets (Boom Street & Bloed Street) up to the junction with Paul Kruger Street, where the R101 becomes Paul Kruger Street northwards.

On either side of the Paul Kruger Street junction, the M22 meets the northern terminus of the M18 route (Bosman Street coming from the south and Thabo Sehume Street heading towards the south; one-way streets). Just after meeting the M18, the M22 becomes one street eastwards (no-longer one-way streets), crosses the Apies River and meets the M5 route (Steve Biko Road) adjacent to the University of Pretoria Basic Medical Sciences Building in Prinshof.

The M22 continues eastwards through the suburb of Rietondale as Soutpansberg Road, meeting the southern terminus of the M29 route (Parker Street). After Rietondale, the M22 meets the M7 route (Stead Avenue; Gordon Road) for the second time in the suburb of Queenswood. At the junction with CR Swart Drive, the M22 becomes CR Swart Drive northwards and separates Queenswood in the west from Kilner Park in the east. It reaches its end at the Harry Muller Circle, where it meets the M8 route (Nico Smith Road; Stormvoel Road).
