= M1 (Pretoria) =

Road in Pretoria

Metropolitan route M1

Route information
- Maintained by City of Tshwane Metropolitan Municipality
- Length: 12 km (7.5 mi)

Major junctions
- South end: M2 / M6 in Pretoria CBD
- R104 / M22 in Pretoria CBD; M4 in Marabastad; M22 in Marabastad; R514 / M8 in Hermanstad; R80 in Roseville; R101 in Mayville; R101 / R513 near Annlin; R513 near Pretoria North
- North end: R566 near Annlin

Location
- Country: South Africa

Highway system
- Numbered routes of South Africa
→ M2

The M1 road is a short metropolitan route in the City of Tshwane in Gauteng, South Africa. It connects Pretoria West and the Pretoria CBD with Pretoria North via Mayville.

It is an alternative route to the R101 route for travel between Pretoria CBD and Pretoria North.

== Route ==
The M1 route begins at a junction with the M2 route (Nana Sita Street; Charlotte Maxeke Street) and the western terminus of the M6 route (Visagie Street). It heads northwards as Es'kia Mphahlele Drive (formerly DF Malan Drive), separating Pretoria West in the west from Pretoria CBD in the east and meeting the R104 route (WF Nkomo Street) and the M22 route at the next junction. Here, the M22 route stops co-signing with the R104 eastwards on WF Nkomo Street and begins co-signing with the M1 northwards on Es'kia Mphahlele Drive.

Continuing north, the M1/M22 meets the M4 route (Johannes Ramokhoase Street; Struben Street; Vom Hagen Street) at the next junction in Marabastad. At the next junction with Bloed Street/Boom Street, the M22 becomes its own road eastwards (Boom Street eastwards from the M1 and Bloed Street westwards to the M1), leaving the M1 as the road northwards.

Still named Es'kia Mphahlele Drive, the M1 continues north, leaving the Pretoria CBD and bypassing the Tshwane University of Technology, to reach an interchange with the eastern terminus of the R514 route (Van Der Hoff Road) and the western terminus of the M8 route (Flowers Street) just east of the Hermanstad suburb (west of Capital Park). It continues north, following the Apies River, to pass through the suburb of Roseville, where it meets the southern terminus of the R80 highway (Mabopane Highway).

From Roseville, the M1 continues following the Apies River north-north-east as Es'kia Mphahlele Drive, passing in-between Mountain View and Parktown Estates, to enter Mayville, where it reaches a junction with the R101 route (Paul Kruger Street; which is also coming from the CBD). The M1 joins the R101 and they are one road northwards as Paul Kruger Street up to the next junction near the Wonderboom Nature Reserve in Annlin, where they meet the R513 route.

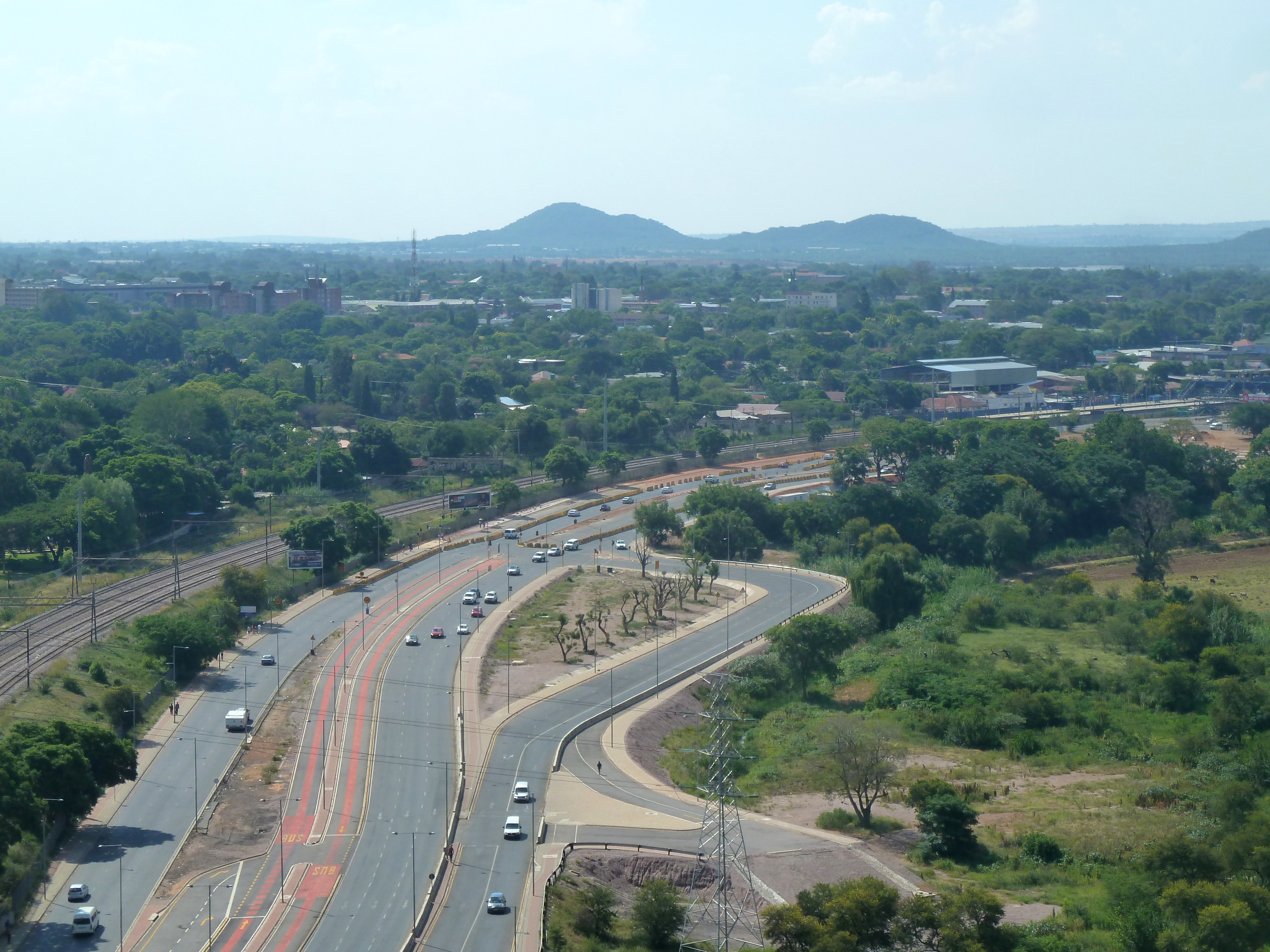
The M1 in-between Pretoria North and Annlin West

The R101 continues via a right turn as Lavender Road (co-signed with the R513 East) while the M1 remains as the road northwards (co-signed with the R513 West). At the next interchange, the R513 becomes Rachel de Beer Street westwards into the Pretoria North suburb while the M1 remains as the road northwards. After the President Steyn Street interchange, the M1 reaches its northern terminus at a t-junction with the R566 route.
