= M4 (Pretoria) =

Road in Pretoria

Metropolitan route M4

Route information
- Maintained by City of Tshwane Metropolitan Municipality and SANRAL
- Length: 26 km (16 mi)

Major junctions
- East end: M5 in Arcadia
- M3 in Arcadia; M18 in Pretoria CBD; R101 in Pretoria CBD; M1 / M22 in Marabastad; R55 in Pretoria West
- West end: R511 / R104 near Hartbeespoort

Location
- Country: South Africa

Highway system
- Numbered routes of South Africa
| ← M3 | → M5 |

The M4 road is a metropolitan route in the City of Tshwane in Gauteng, South Africa. It connects Pretoria with Hartbeespoort. The route is a toll road, with two tollgates on the freeway section between Pretoria West and Hartbeespoort (one at either end).

For its entire length, it is parallel to the R104 road, which also connects Pretoria with Hartbeespoort.

== Route ==
The M4 begins in Arcadia, Pretoria (just west of the Union Buildings), at a junction with the two one-way-streets that form the M5 route (Hamilton Street; Steve Biko Street). It starts as two one-way streets (Johannes Ramokhoase Street, formerly Proes Street, westwards from the M5 and Struben Street eastwards to the M5), heading westwards and meeting the northern terminus of the M3 route (Nelson Mandela Drive) at the next junction. It enters the Pretoria CBD and meets the two one-way streets of the M18 route (Thabo Sehume Street; Bosman Street) before meeting the two one-way streets of the R101 route (Sophie de Bruyn Street; Kgosi Mampuru Street).

At the junction with the M1 route (E'skia Mphahlele Drive) in Marabastad, the M4 stops being two one-way streets and becomes one street westwards named Vom Hagen Street, passing through Pretoria West. At the junction with the R55 route (Transoranje Road) south of Danville, the M4 becomes the Magalies Toll Route and has the Quagga Toll Plaza just after.

The M4 heads west as a freeway for 18 km (11 mi), with one off-ramp north of Atteridgeville (south of Lotus Gardens), to reach the Pelindaba Toll Plaza just before the North West Province boundary. Immediately after the tollgate, the M4 ends at an off-ramp t-junction, with the road southwards providing access to Pelindaba and Broederstroom (7 km [4.3 mi] away) and the road northwards providing access to the R511 road to Hartbeespoort (7 km [4.3 mi] away).

== History ==
The current M4 was part of the original main route from Pretoria to the west towards Rustenburg. The entire stretch of road from Pretoria to Hartbeespoort was previously part of the N4 national route, which connects the Mozambique Border in the east with the Botswana Border in the west. Then, the N4 was realigned on a new highway known as the Pretoria Bypass, which forms part of the Platinum Highway maintained by Bakwena, in order for the city centre to be bypassed to the north and east. So, both Hartbeespoort and Pretoria Central are bypassed to the north.

The old route through Pretoria Central, specifically from the M5 junction to the west, was then re-designated as the M4 Metropolitan Route of Tshwane, although some Global Positioning Systems still label this old route as the N4 together with the newer route north of Pretoria. Even the road signage on the Magalies Toll Freeway section may still have N4 indicated rather than M4, with M4 showing on signs off the highway.
