= M2 (Pretoria) =

Road in Pretoria

Metropolitan route M2

Route information
- Maintained by City of Tshwane Metropolitan Municipality
- Length: 12.2 km (7.6 mi)

Major junctions
- East end: N1 / N4 near Hatfield
- M7 in Hatfield; M5 in Arcadia; M3 in Arcadia; M18 in Pretoria CBD; R101 in Pretoria CBD; M1 / M6 in Pretoria West
- West end: M22 at Proclamation Hill

Location
- Country: South Africa

Highway system
- Numbered routes of South Africa
| ← M1 | → M3 |

The M2 road is a metropolitan route in the City of Tshwane in Gauteng, South Africa. It connects the N1 and N4 highways at the Proefplaas Interchange with Proclamation Hill via Hatfield, Pretoria CBD and Pretoria West.

== Route ==
The M2 starts at the Proefplaas interchange with the N1 highway (Pretoria Bypass) and the N4 highway (Maputo Corridor) in Pretoria East, just north of the Scientia suburb. It heads west to pass through the Hatfield suburb, becoming two one-way streets (Pretorius Street westwards from the N1 and Francis Baard Street, formerly Schoeman Street, eastwards to the N1) and meeting the M7 route (Gordon Road; Jan Shoba Street).

At Arcadia, the M2 meets the M5 route (Hamilton Street; Steve Biko Road) and immediately afterwards, it meets the M3 route (Nelson Mandela Drive). The M2 leaves Pretorius Street and Francis Baard Street to join the M3 on Nelson Mandela Drive southwards up to the next junction, where the M2 becomes Nana Sita Street (formerly Skinner Street) westwards.

It passes through the Pretoria CBD westwards as Nana Sita Street, meeting the M18 route (Thabo Sehume Street; Bosman Street) and the R101 route (Sophie de Bruyn Street; Kgosi Mampuru Street). Just after the Pretoria CBD, the M2 reaches a junction, where it meets the southern terminus of the M1 route (Es'kia Mphahlele Drive) and the western terminus of the M6 route (Visagie Street), where it crosses into Pretoria West.

It once again becomes two one-way streets (Charlotte Maxeke Street, formerly Mitchell Street, westwards and Soutter Street eastwards) through Pretoria West, before becoming one street westwards (Charlotte Maxeke Street) and reaching its end at a junction with the M22 route (Quagga Road) at Proclamation Hill.

== History ==
Together with the M4 route, the section of the M2 route from the Proefplaas Interchange near Hatfield to the M5 junction in Arcadia was previously part of the N4 national route, which connects the Mozambique Border in the east with the Botswana Border in the west. It was part of the main route from the east of Pretoria to the west of Pretoria.

Then, the N4 was realigned on a new highway known as the Pretoria Bypass, which forms part of the Platinum Highway maintained by Bakwena, in order for the city centre to be bypassed to the north and east. The old route through Pretoria Central, specifically from the Proefplaas Interchange to the M5 junction, was then re-designated as the M2 Metropolitan Route of Tshwane, although some Global Positioning Systems still label this old route as the N4 together with the newer route north of Pretoria.
