= M3 (Pretoria) =

Road in Pretoria, South Africa

Metropolitan route M3

Route information
- Maintained by City of Tshwane Metropolitan Municipality
- Length: 2.6 km (1.6 mi)

Major junctions
- South end: M18 near Fountains Valley
- M11 in Sunnyside; M6 in Sunnyside; M2 in Arcadia; R104 in Arcadia
- North end: M4 in Arcadia

Location
- Country: South Africa

Highway system
- Numbered routes of South Africa
← M2	→ M4

The M3 road is a short metropolitan route in the City of Tshwane in Gauteng, South Africa. It consists of only one road (Nelson Mandela Drive) in the Pretoria CBD.

== Route ==
The M3 begins at a junction with the M18 route (Thabo Sehume Street; Nelson Mandela Drive) about 1.3 kilometres north of the M18's interchange with the R21 route, M5 route and M7 route (known as the Fountains Circle; adjacent to Fountains Valley). The M3 begins by heading north-north-east as Nelson Mandela Drive, parallel to the M5 and following the Apies River, to separate the Pretoria CBD in the west from the Sunnyside suburb in the east, where it meets the M11 route (Scheiding Street; Rissik Street) and the M6 route (Kotze Street; Visagie Street).

Just after meeting the M6, it reaches a junction with the M2 route (Nana Sita Street). Here, the M2 joins the M3 and they are one road north-north-east up to the next junction, where the M2 becomes its own road eastwards (Francis Baard Street from the M3 and Pretorius Street to the M3; one-way streets). The M3 continues northwards, still parallel to the M5 and following the Apies River, separating the Pretoria CBD in the west from the Arcadia suburb in the east, meeting the R104 route (Stanza Bopape Street; Helen Joseph Street), to reach its end at a junction with the M4 route (Johannes Ramokhoase Street; Edmond Street).
