= M5 (Pretoria) =

Road in Pretoria, South Africa

Metropolitan route M5

Route information
- Maintained by City of Tshwane Metropolitan Municipality
- Length: 10.7 km (6.6 mi)

Major junctions
- South end: R21 / M7 / M18 at Fountains Valley
- M11 in Sunnyside; M6 in Sunnyside; M2 in Arcadia; R104 in Arcadia; M4 in Arcadia; M22 in Prinshof; M8 in Gezina
- North end: R101 / R513 in Annlin

Location
- Country: South Africa

Highway system
- Numbered routes of South Africa
| ← M4 | → M6 |

The M5 road is a metropolitan route in the City of Tshwane in Gauteng, South Africa. It connects Fountains Valley in southern Pretoria with Annlin in northern Pretoria via Sunnyside, Arcadia and Gezina. For much of its route, it is named Steve Biko Road.

== Route ==
The M5 begins just north of Fountains Valley near Groenkloof, at a roundabout junction with the M7 route, M18 route and R21 route (this roundabout is known as the Fountains Circle). It begins by heading north-east as Elandspoort Road, bypassing the University of Pretoria Groenkloof Campus, to enter the Sunnyside suburb, where it meets the M11 route (Justice Mahomed Street; Rissik Street) and becomes two one-way streets (Steve Biko Road northwards from the M11 and Troye Street southwards to the M11).

The M5 then meets the M6 route (Kotze Street) before entering the suburb of Arcadia (just east of Pretoria CBD), where it meets the M2 route (Francis Baard Street; Pretorius Street). Here, Troye Street (the southwards one-way street) changes its name to Hamilton Street (the northwards road remains as Steve Biko Road). At the next junction, the M5 meets the R104 route (Stanza Bopape Street). At the next junction (just west of the Union Buildings), the M5 meets the eastern terminus of the M4 route (Johannes Ramokhoase Street; Struben Street).

Leaving Arcadia, the M5 continues northwards and reaches a junction with the M22 route (Soutpansberg Road) in Prinshof (adjacent to the University of Pretoria Basic Medical Sciences Building). Just after, it becomes one street northwards (Steve Biko Road) for 500 metres before becoming two one-way streets again (Steve Biko Road northwards & Johan Heyns Drive, formerly Hendrik Verwoerd Drive, southwards) at the Steve Biko Academic Hospital and entering the suburb of Gezina (just east of Capital Park). Just after, it meets the M8 route (Flowers Street; Trouw Street).

The M8 joins the M5 northwards for 750 metres before becoming its own road eastwards (Nico Smith Street; Frederika Street). The M5 continues north from Gezina, passing through Wonderboom South and the eastern side of the Wonderboom Nature Reserve, to reach its northern terminus at a junction with Lavender Road (R101; R513) in Annlin.
