= M29 (Pretoria) =

Road in Pretoria, South Africa

Metropolitan route M29

Route information
- Maintained by City of Tshwane Metropolitan Municipality

Major junctions
- South end: M22 in Rietondale
- M8 near Gezina; R513 in Montana Park
- North end: N4 in Doornpoort

Location
- Country: South Africa

Highway system
- Numbered routes of South Africa
← M28	→ M30

The M29 road is a metropolitan route in the City of Tshwane in Gauteng, South Africa. It is made up of two disjoint segments in the northern suburbs of Pretoria, with one section connecting Rietondale to Waverley and the other section connecting Montana Park to Doornpoort.

== Route ==
=== First Section ===
The M29 begins at a junction with the M22 route (Soutpansberg Road). It begins by heading northwards as Parker Street, separating Rietondale in the east from Riviera in the west, becoming 15th Avenue, bending to the north-east as Frates Road and bypassing Gezina, to reach a junction with the M8 route (Nico Smith Road). It continues north-east, passing in-between the Villieria and Rietfontein suburbs, to reach a junction with Meyer Street in the Waverley suburb, just south of the Magaliesberg range, marking its end.

=== Second Section ===
The M29 resumes on the other side of the Magaliesberg range, in the suburb of Montana Park, at a junction with Braam Pretorius Street. It heads northwards as Dr. Swanepoel Road to reach a junction with the R513 Route (Sefako Makgatho Drive). It continues northwards, entering the Doornpoort suburb and meeting a road to Wonderboom Airport, to reach its northern terminus at an interchange with the N4 highway (Platinum Highway; Pretoria Northern Bypass) adjacent to the N4's Doornpoort Toll Plaza.
