= M14 (Pretoria) =

Road in Pretoria, South Africa

Metropolitan route M14

Route information
- Maintained by City of Tshwane Metropolitan Municipality
- Length: 8.5 km (5.3 mi)

Major junctions
- South-west end: M16 in Lynnwood Manor
- N4 near Silverton; R104 in Silverton; M12 in Waitloo
- North-east end: M8 in Waitloo

Location
- Country: South Africa

Highway system
- Numbered routes of South Africa
← M13	→ M15

The M14 road is a metropolitan route in the City of Tshwane in Gauteng, South Africa. It connects Lynnwood Manor with Waitloo via Silverton.

== Route ==
The M14 route begins in Lynnwood Manor, at a junction with the M16 route (Meiring Naude Road), just north of the M16's intersection with the M6 route. It begins by heading north-east, then north, as Lynburn Road to reach a junction with the N4 highway (Maputo Corridor).

It continues north-east as Watermeyer Street through the Val de Grace suburb to meet the R104 route (Pretoria Street) in Silverton. It continues north-east as Waitloo Road through the suburb of Waitloo to meet the northern terminus of the M12 route (Simon Vermooten Road). It proceeds northwards to end at the next junction, where it meets the M8 route (Stormvoel Road).
