= M8 (Pretoria) =

Road in Pretoria, South Africa

Metropolitan route M8

Route information
- Maintained by City of Tshwane Metropolitan Municipality
- Length: 27.5 km (17.1 mi)

Major junctions
- West end: R514 / M1 at Hermanstad
- R101 in Capital Park; M5 in Gezina; M29 in Villieria; M7 in Villieria; M22 in Môregloed; N1 / N4 near Kilner Park; M15 near Lindopark; M15 in Silvertondale; M14 in Waitloo
- East end: M10 in Mamelodi

Location
- Country: South Africa

Highway system
- Numbered routes of South Africa
← M7	→ M9

The M8 road is a metropolitan route in the City of Tshwane in Gauteng, South Africa. It connects Capital Park with Mamelodi via Gezina, Villieria and Eersterust.

== Route ==
The M8 route begins at an interchange with the M1 route (E'skia Mphahlele Drive) and the eastern terminus of the R514 route (Van Der Hoff Road) just east of the Hermanstad suburb. The M8 begins by heading eastwards, immediately crossing the Apies River and becoming two one-way streets (Trouw Street eastwards from the river and Flowers Street westwards to the river), passing through the suburb of Capital Park and meeting the R101 route (Paul Kruger Street).

The M8 enters the suburb of Gezina and reaches a junction with the M5 route (Steve Biko Road; Johan Heyns Drive). The M8 joins the M5 and they are co-signed northwards for 750 metres before the M8 becomes its own road eastwards, once again becoming two one-way streets (Frederika Street eastwards from the M5 and Nico Smith Street, formerly Michael Brink Street, westwards to the M5).

The M8 then reaches a junction with the M29 route (Frates Street), where it becomes one street eastwards (Nico Smith Street). It passes through the Villieria suburb to meet the north-eastern terminus of the M7 route (Stead Avenue). It then passes in-between the Moreglôed and Queenswood suburbs to meet the north-eastern terminus of the M22 route (CR Swart Drive) at the Harry Muller Circle. Just after, the M8 crosses the N1/N4 toll highway (Pretoria Eastern Bypass) (each ramp onto the highway has a tollgate) as Stormvoel Road.

Just after the N1/N4 highway interchange, the M8 meets the M15 route (Baviaanspoort Road). Here, the M15 joins the M8 and they are one road eastwards for 2.5 km before the M15 becomes its own road southwards (Derdepoort Road) north of Silverton. The M8 continues eastwards, forming the southern boundary of the Eersterust suburb, to enter the large township of Mamelodi and meet the northern terminus of the M14 route (Waitloo Road).

From the M14 junction, the M8 heads eastwards as Tsamaya Road through Mamelodi for 9 kilometres to reach its eastern terminus in Mamelodi East, at a junction with the M10 route (Solomon Mahlangu Drive), just south of the M10's junction with the R513 route.
