= M12 (Pretoria) =

Road in Pretoria, South Africa

Metropolitan route M12

Route information
- Maintained by City of Tshwane Metropolitan Municipality
- Length: 5.3 km (3.3 mi)

Major junctions
- South end: M6 in Die Wilgers
- M13 in Die Wilgers; N4 near Equestria; R104 near Silverton
- North end: M14 in Waitloo

Location
- Country: South Africa

Highway system
- Numbered routes of South Africa
← M11	→ M13

The M12 road is a metropolitan route in the City of Tshwane in Gauteng, South Africa. It connects Die Wilgers with Waitloo.

== Route ==
The M12 route begins in Die Wilgers (east of Lynnwood Ridge), at a junction with the M6 route (Lynnwood Road). it begins by heading northwards as Simion Vermooten Road, separating Die Wilgers in the west from Equestria in the east, to cross the N4 highway (Maputo Corridor) and separate Meyerspark in the west from Willow Park Manor in the east. It then reaches a junction with the R104 route (Pretoria Street) and enters the suburb of Waitloo, where it ends at a junction with the M14 route (Waitloo Road).
