= R514 (South Africa) =

Regional route in South Africa

Regional route R514

Route information
- Length: 27 km (17 mi)

Major junctions
- West end: R511 in Hartbeespoort
- R55 in Pretoria
- East end: M1 / M8 in Pretoria

Location
- Country: South Africa
- Major cities: Hartbeespoort, Pretoria

Highway system
- Numbered routes of South Africa
← R513	→ R515

The R514 is a Regional Route in South Africa that connects Hartbeespoort with Pretoria.

== Route ==
Its western origin is a junction with the R511 road in Hartbeespoort, North West, just north of the town centre. Heading east, it crosses into Gauteng and enters Pretoria in the City of Tshwane Metropolitan Municipality as Van Der Hoff Road. It runs through the suburbs of Kirkney, Booysens and Claremont, crosses the R55 road (Bremer Street), and continues through the Daspoort and Hermanstad suburbs to end at an intersection with Pretoria's M1 road (Es'kia Mphahlele Drive) just north of Pretoria's CBD. East of the M1 road, it is signed as Pretoria's M8 road (Flowers Street).
