= Overkruin Library =

Overkruin Library is a public community library located in Sinoville, a suburb north of Pretoria, in the City of Tshwane, South Africa. The library was situated in the Sinoville Shopping Centre and officially connected to the broader Tshwane municipal library system. he library was also equipped with an automated library system known as Symphony by SirsiDynix implemented in 2009, replacing an older Erudite system from 1986, alongside approximately 40 other libraries in the Tshwane network.

In December 2017, Tshwane Metro announced a temporary closure of Overkruin Library, citing occupational health and safety concerns and issues related to leasing the property. The metro initially attributed the closure to “logistical issues,” but later confirmed legal disputes with the property owner as the primary cause.

Tshwane Metro sought alternative venues through a tender process to re-establish library services. However, an initial tender was declared unresponsive, prompting revised specifications and new tender rounds. Metro officials cautioned that reopening could take many months. 7 years later, the re-opening of the library remains uncertain and the continued closure compels patrons to travel to more distant libraries.
