= Advanced Automotive Design =

South African automobile and kit car manufacturer

- Industry: Automotive
- Founded: 1995
- Founder: Brian Glover; Rhys Edwards
- Defunct: 2010
- Headquarters: Die Wilgers, Pretoria, South Africa
- Products: kit cars

Advanced Automotive Design (AAD) was a South African automobile and kit car manufacturer located in Die Wilgers, Pretoria. The company was founded in 1995 by Brian Glover and Rhys Edwards. Shaka is a registered Trademark of the AAD.

Rhys Edwards lead the design and engineering of AAD. He had experience in constructing race cars and vehicles for the Armed Forces.

== Vehicles ==
In 1997, they showed their first vehicle called Shaka Nynya on the South Florida Auto Show. This was a concept car similar to the Plymouth Prowler. Sales began in 2000. Glover Designs Inc from Florida distributed the vehicles in the USA . One source states that production ended in 2010. In 2000 and 2002 one complete vehicle was built, in 2001 none and in 2003 two.

The model was a sports car. It used a space frame made of tubes and had an open two-seater body made of fiberglass mounted on it. The literature describes the vehicle as being in the style of a Lotus Seven but with a more modern body. Another source describes it as having a similarity to the Plymouth Prowler. The standard engine was a V8 engine from Oldsmobile with a displacement of 5700 cc, but another engine from Oldsmobile and a V6 engine from Buick are also known to have been used. Another source mentions engines from Chevrolet.

The companies other model was the Shaka Giotto which was a coupe with a similar shape to the Nissan 300ZX.

== Model Overview ==
- Shaka Giotto (since 2000, only South Africa)
- Shaka Nynya (since 2000)
