= Tshwane District Hospital =

Geography
- Location: Prinshof 349-Jr, Pretoria, South Africa
- Coordinates: 25°43′57″S 28°12′06″E

Organisation
- Type: Level 1

History
- Opened: 2006

Links
- Lists: Hospitals in South Africa

Tshwane District Hospital (TDH) is a public sector hospital situated in Prinshof 349-Jr, a suburb of Pretoria, South Africa. It was established in 2006. It has approximately 200 beds.

The building in which it is located was formerly known as H. F. Verwoerd Hospital until 1994, and as Pretoria Academic Hospital (now Steve Biko Hospital) until 2006. TDH is now a separate level 1 community hospital that deals with non-critical care, while the Steve Biko Hospital is located approximately 100 meters away and provides tertiary care. The two hospitals are connected by a tunnel.

== See also ==
- Tshwane District
