= M16 (Pretoria) =

Road in Pretoria, South Africa

Metropolitan route M16

Route information
- Maintained by City of Tshwane Metropolitan Municipality
- Length: 3.9 km (2.4 mi)

Major junctions
- South end: M6 / N1 in Lynnwood Manor
- M14 in Lynnwood Manor
- North end: R104 in Scientia

Location
- Country: South Africa

Highway system
- Numbered routes of South Africa
← M15	→ M17

The M16 road is a short metropolitan route in the City of Tshwane in Gauteng, South Africa. It connects Lynnwood Manor with Scientia.

== Route ==
The M16 route begins in Lynnwood Manor, at an interchange with the M6 route (Lynnwood Road) and the N1 highway (Pretoria Eastern Bypass). It begins by heading north as Meiring Naude Road, parallel to the N1 highway, meeting the south-western terminus of the M14 route (Lynburn Road), to fly over the N4 highway (Maputo Corridor) and reach a T-junction with Cussonia Avenue on the southern side of the Pretoria National Botanical Garden. The M16 becomes Cussonia Avenue westwards and proceeds to reach its end at a junction with the R104 route (Pretoria Street) on the western side of the National Botanical Garden.
