= Hoërskool Staatspresident C R Swart =

Coordinates: 25°42′31″S 28°15′25″E

Hoërskool CR Swart

Location
- 139 Collins Avenue, Moregloed; Pretoria, Gauteng; South Africa

Information
- School type: Public school
- Motto: Dit is ons erns
- Religious affiliation: Christianity
- School district: District 9
- Grades: 8–12
- Gender: Boys & Girls
- Age: 14 to 18
- Language: Afrikaans
- Schedule: 07:20 - 14:15
- Campus: Urban Campus
- Campus type: Suburban

Hoërskool Staatspresident C R Swart is an English high school situated in Waverley, Pretoria, one of the Eastern suburbs of Pretoria, South Africa.

== History ==
The school is named after His Excellency C R Swart, the first State President of the Republic of South Africa.
