= M15 (Pretoria) =

Road in Pretoria, South Africa

Metropolitan route M15

Route information
- Maintained by City of Tshwane Metropolitan Municipality
- Length: 8.7 km (5.4 mi)

Major junctions
- North end: R513 / R573 near Roodeplaat
- M8 in Lindopark
- South end: R104 in Silverton

Location
- Country: South Africa

Highway system
- Numbered routes of South Africa
← M14	→ M16

The M15 road is a metropolitan route in the City of Tshwane in Gauteng, South Africa. It connects Derdepoort (near Roodeplaat) with Silverton.

== Route ==
The M15 route begins at a junction with the R513 route (Sefako Makgatho Drive) and the south-western terminus of the R573 route (Moloto Road) in Derdepoort (just east of Montana Park and west of Roodeplaat). It begins by heading south-west for 4 kilometres as Baviaanspoort Road, parallel to the N1/N4 highway (Pretoria Eastern Bypass), through East Lynne, to reach a junction with the M8 route (Stormvoel Road) in Lindopark.

The M15 joins the M8 and they are one road eastwards for 2.5 kilometres before the M15 leaves Stormvoel Road and becomes its own road southwards named Derdepoort Road. It passes through the suburb of Silverton to reach its end at a junction with the R104 route (Pretoria Street).
