= Willowridge High School =

Willowridge High School can refer to:

- Willowridge High School (Houston)
- Willowridge High School (Pretoria)
