= Pierneef Theatre =

Theatre in Pretoria, South Africa

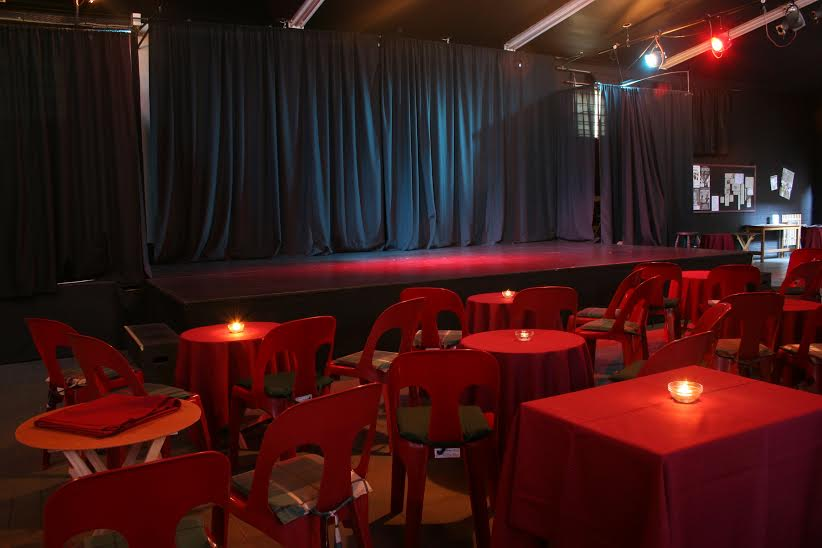
An image of Pierneef Theatre

The Pierneef Theatre is located in the neighborhood of Villieria, Pretoria, South Africa, on the grounds of Rietondale High School, formerly known as Hoërskool Hendrik Verwoerd. The first performance in this theatre was in March 2003, a collaboration with Die Teaterhuisie in Sunnyside, featured acting couple Petru Wessels and Carel Trichardt. It has become renowned nationwide since then, and hosted several foreign entertainers as well.

== Performances ==
Performers who have appeared at the theatre include Sandra Prinsloo, Wilna Snyman, Patrick Mynhardt, Marga van Rooy, Mathys Roets, Chris Chameleon, Rina Hugo, Manuel Escorcio, Christa Steyn, Jannie du Toit, Lucas Maree, Jannie Moolman, Anton Goosen, Dozi (singer), Jan Blohm, Jak de Priester, and Radio Kalahari Orkes.

== Variety ==
The theatre offers occasional daytime concerts for those who do not wish to go out at night. Young artists have gone on to notoriety after their first performances here as well.

The Pierneef Theatre also operates as a children's theatre. These performances are held on mornings during school vacation and on Saturdays the rest of the year, not only entertaining children but also cultivating the next generation of theatre-goers.

== Community involvement ==
The "In Spite Of" Project, a collaboration between the Pierneef Theatre and the Cordis Trust, provides opportunities for one week a year for people with disabilities to participate in theatre, with fundraising and awareness key goals as well.
