= M13 (Pretoria) =

Road in Pretoria, South Africa

Metropolitan route M13

Route information
- Maintained by City of Tshwane Metropolitan Municipality
- Length: 4 km (2.5 mi)

Major junctions
- East end: M12 in Die Wilgers
- West end: N4 in Die Wilgers

Location
- Country: South Africa

Highway system
- Numbered routes of South Africa
← M12	→ M14

The M13 road is a metropolitan route in the City of Tshwane in Gauteng, South Africa. It consists of one street named Rossouw Street in the Die Wilgers suburb of Pretoria.

== Route ==
It starts at a junction with the M12 route (Simon Vermooten Road) just west of Equestria and heads westwards through the suburb of Die Wilgers for 4 kilometres to end at a junction with the N4 highway (Maputo Corridor) just south of Murrayfield.
