= Pretoria North =

Pretoria North Pretoria-Noord
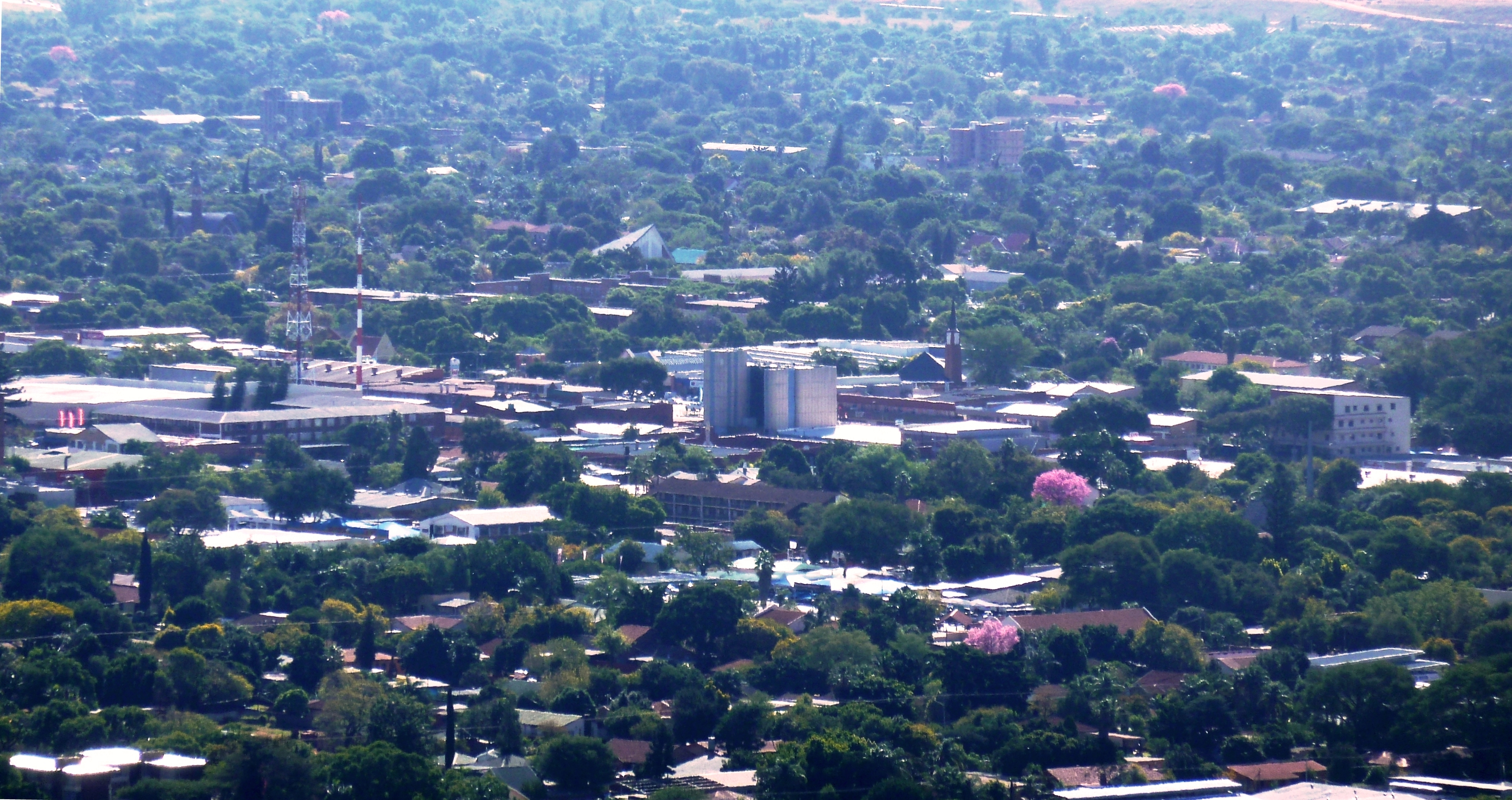
- View on Pretoria North

- Location within Gauteng Location within South Africa
- Coordinates: 25°40′23″S 28°10′24″E
- Country: South Africa
- Province: Gauteng
- Municipality: City of Tshwane
- Main Place: Pretoria

Area
  - Total: 6.16 km^{2} (2.38 sq mi)

Population (2011)
  - Total: 12,972
  - Density: 2,110/km^{2} (5,450/sq mi)

Racial makeup (2011)
  - Black African: 26.0%
  - Coloured: 2.1%
  - Indian/Asian: 0.9%
  - White: 70.4%
  - Other: 0.7%

First languages (2011)
  - Afrikaans: 69.1%
  - English: 9.3%
  - Tswana: 4.9%
  - Northern Sotho: 4.5%
  - Other: 12.2%
- Time zone: UTC+2 (SAST)
- Postal code (street): 0182
- PO box: 0116
- Website: www.pretoria-north.co.za

Pretoria North (Afrikaans: Pretoria-Noord) is a suburb of the city of Pretoria, Gauteng, South Africa, with a population of 16,972 people according to the 2011 census.

== History ==
Pretoria North was first settled in 1878 by a pioneer column of Afrikaner farmers who started farming alongside the passing Apies River. The Area became a stopping point for travelers moving through the North of Pretoria to the Northern Transvaal.

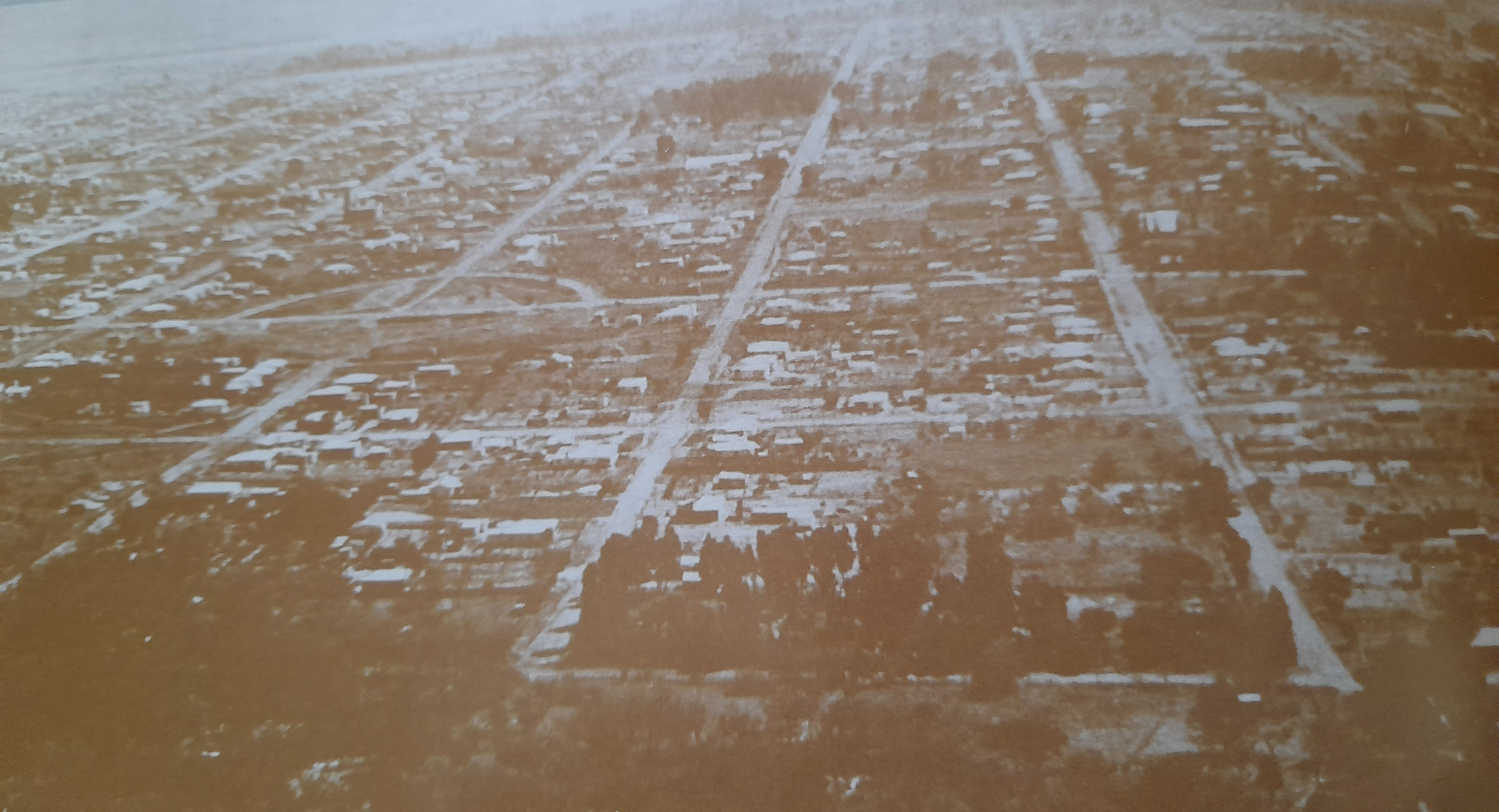
Pretoria North in the late 1940s.

In 1904 an English medium primary School was established in Pretoria. This school was the antecedent to the current Laerskool Danie Malan on the corners of Rachel De Beer and Jan van Riebeeck streets in Pretoria North. This school has been an anchor of the Pretoria North Community for over 110 years and is rich in history and tradition.

Other Schools in the Pretoria North Precinct include Laerskool Rachel de Beer, Laerskool Voortrekker Eeufees, Hoërskool Gerrit Maritz and Pretoria North High School. All schools in the area are Afrikaans medium.

As the name suggests, it is situated to the north of the city centre. It lies 8 kilometres (5 mi) from Church Square, just north of the Magaliesberg and adjacent to Paul Kruger Street (the M1) and the railway line from Pretoria to Polokwane. The Railway connecting Pretoria with Polokwane was laid down by the Paul Kruger Administration in between 1886 and 1899. The Construction was disrupted by the Anglo Boer War but it was finalized before 1910. The Wonderboom station of the railway line is part of the Pretoria North complex and was a reason why the area developed into a small town of its own, functionally connected to the greater city of Pretoria.

With transport being its main industry, Pretoria North has two automobile sales corridors in the form of Rachel De Beer street and Gerrit Maritz streets being home to over 50 car dealerships. Pretoria North has one of the highest concentration of car dealerships in the country.

Transport is the core of Pretoria North's industrial activity. The area boasts a light motor industrial corridor couched by east and Gerrit Maritz Streets. Glass makers, panel beaters, parts manufacturers and mechanics work in the chain of warehouses in this eastern corridor.

At the heart of the Pretoria North CBD is the North Park shopping mall which is a very small and quiet shopping center not maintained anymore. The main retail activity in Pretoria North takes place in the displaced retail center of Shoprite located on the corner of Ben Viljoen and Gerrit Maritz Streets.

The Coert Steynberg museum enriches Pretoria North with cultural depth, celebrating the life and work of the renowned South African sculptor, and medalist. The local street names also weave a historical tapestry into the area, honoring figures such as Heroes and Afrikaner heroine Racheltjie de Beer.

More than 20 Churches and other Religious dominations are situated in Pretoria North.

The Pretoria North area is largely residential with the Rachel De Beer and Gerrit Maritz corridors straddled by Ben Viljoen Street being the central business district.

Pretoria North sometimes refers to the general area to the North of the City of Pretoria. This general definition is broad and encompasses the Wonderboom area to the east of Lavender Road and Akasia to the west of Daan De Wet Nel Drive. This broad definition of Pretoria North is a colloquial concept and is not to be confused with the concept in this article.

The Onderstepoort campus of the University of Pretoria Faculty of Veterinary Science, and the Wonderboom Airport are nearby.
