= Pretoria Metal Pressings =

Arms producer in South Africa

Pretoria Metal Pressing
- Industry: Defence
- Founded: 1931
- Headquarters: Pretoria West, City of Tshwane Metropolitan Municipality, South Africa
- Website: http://www.pmp.co.za/

Denel Pretoria Metal Pressings, shortened as Denel PMP or just PMP, is an arms producer in South Africa. It is a division of the Denel Group.

== History ==
Founded since 1931, the company has been producing with code: PMP. it also produced for the South African Mint (ammunition code: SAM).

Through its history, PMP has produced ammunition with different ammunition codes including: SAM, A, RSA, PMP and various number abbreviations. The company's history is linked to the South African mint, which produced ammunition from 1937 to 1964.

As of 2019, they were the only supplier of ammunitions to the South African Police Service.

== Production ==
PMP's main products include civil and military ammunition in calibers from 5.56 mm to 12.7 mm and 20 mm to 35 mm.

Another business area is the production of brass. Every year over 25,000 t are produced for the production of cartridge cases within South Africa and for export.

PMP makes large-caliber sniper rifle NTW-20 and the Neopup Personal Assault Weapon.

Other products are explosives for use in fire extinguishing systems and for emergency opening of aircraft cockpits. In addition, explosives for mining and primers are produced.
