= Lotus Gardens =

- Location within Gauteng Location within South Africa
- Coordinates: 25°44′55″S 28°05′08″E
- Country: South Africa
- Province: Gauteng
- Municipality: City of Tshwane
- Established: 1990's

Area
  - Total: 2.57 km^{2} (0.99 sq mi)

Population (2011)
  - Total: 10,547
  - Density: 4,100/km^{2} (10,600/sq mi)
- Time zone: UTC+2 (SAST)
- Postal code (street): 0008
- PO box: 0025
- Area code: 012

Lotus Gardens is a small suburb situated next to Atteridgeville in the west of Pretoria.

Lotus Gardens, initially referred to as "Dairy Farm", was planned as an Indian township by the apartheid government, under the Group Areas Act, in order to relieve housing pressure in Laudium, and the first cohort of Indian residents moved in during the early 1990s, with children initially bused to schools in Laudium. However, by this time, segregated housing had been abolished, and Lotus Gardens became a mixed community, and by 2011, it had a population that was 80% black African. The township is separated from Atteridgeville by the M4 Magalies Freeway.

After the RDP section was built since 2011, there is Lotus Gardens clinic, and now they also have a Shell garage and an Engen garage.

They are serviced by the Pretoria west police staion.

== Schools ==
- Lotus secondary School
- Fusion High School
- Omar HS Ebrahim Primary School
- S.k Moseneke primary School
- Bagale Primary School
- Brindhaven Primary School
