= Daspoort, Pretoria =

Daspoort
- Location within Gauteng Location within South Africa
- Coordinates: 25.713°S 28.150°E
- Country: South Africa
- Province: Gauteng
- Municipality: City of Tshwane
- Main Place: Pretoria
- Established: 1897

Area
  - Total: 2.16 km^{2} (0.83 sq mi)

Population (2011)
  - Total: 6,355
  - Density: 2,940/km^{2} (7,620/sq mi)

Racial makeup (2011)
  - Black African: 12.65%
  - Coloured: 1.56%
  - Indian/Asian: 0.65%
  - White: 84.78%
  - Other: 0.36%

First languages (2011)
  - English: 6.44%
  - Afrikaans: 83.19%
  - Northern Sotho: 1.66%
  - Tswana: 1.64%
  - Other: 7.07%
- Time zone: UTC+2 (SAST)
- Postal code (street): 0082
- PO box: 0019

Daspoort is an area in Pretoria, South Africa. It lies north-west of the Pretoria CBD.

== History ==
The suburb was created in 1897 on the farm Daspoort. The area was discovered in 1836 by Andries Pretorius and named after the rock hyrax. The nearby Daspoort Tunnel is named after the suburb.
