= Capital Park, Pretoria =

Capital Park
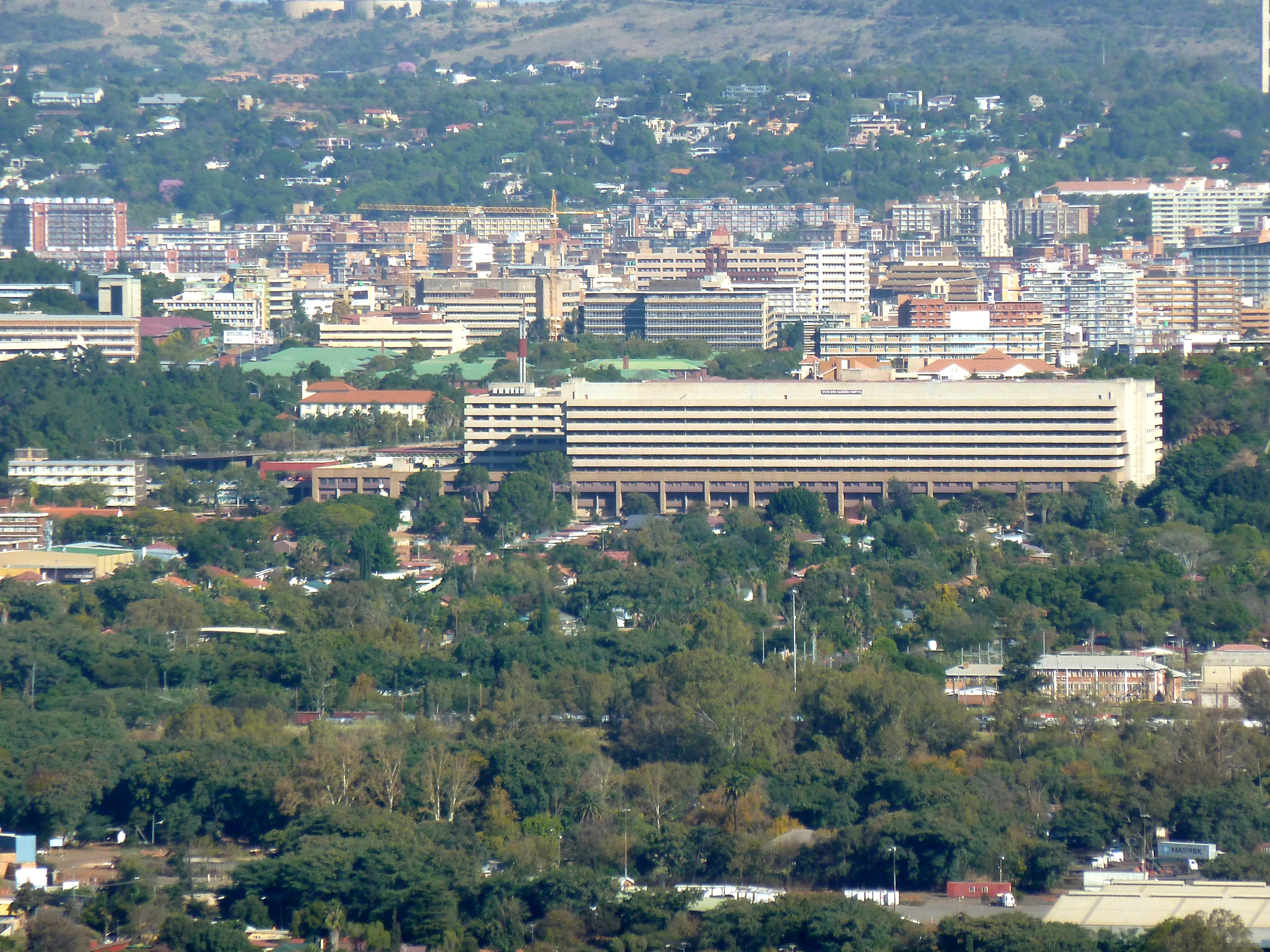
- Steve Biko Academic Hospital in Capital Park

- Location within Gauteng Location within South Africa
- Coordinates: 25°43′38″S 28°11′19″E
- Country: South Africa
- Province: Gauteng
- Municipality: City of Tshwane
- Main Place: Pretoria

Area
  - Total: 3.42 km^{2} (1.32 sq mi)

Population (2011)
  - Total: 8,094
  - Density: 2,370/km^{2} (6,130/sq mi)

Racial makeup (2011)
  - Black African: 29.6%
  - Coloured: 2.8%
  - Indian/Asian: 1.5%
  - White: 65.4%
  - Other: 0.6%

First languages (2011)
  - Afrikaans: 60.7%
  - English: 19.6%
  - Northern Sotho: 7.0%
  - Zulu: 2.5%
  - Other: 6.0%
- Time zone: UTC+2 (SAST)
- Postal code (street): 0084

Capital Park is one of Pretoria's oldest and first suburbs and lies approximately 4 km north of the historic Church Square, behind the Pretoria National Zoo. The neighbourhood is bordered by the Witwatersberge on the south side and the Apies River on the west side. The neighbourhood extends from the Apies River to Johan Heyns Drive (previously Voortrekker Street). Streets in the neighbourhood are named after early mayors of Pretoria (Venter Street, Malherbe Street, Van Heerden Street, Myburg Street). One of the former mayoral residences is in Capital Park. Capital Park was previously a very popular neighbourhood among Italian as well as Portuguese communities – the Portuguese Church is still in Van Heerden Street (2010). The residential area today is cosmopolitan, with predominantly Afrikaans speaking inhabitants. The CPRTA (Capital Park Residents and Taxpayers Association) functions as residents' association to look after the interests of its residents.

Schools in Capital Park include Hoërskool Langenhoven, Capital Park Primary School, and Laerskool Generaal Jacques Pienaar. Several Afrikaans and English language churches are located in Capital Park.

Capital Park is centrally located, with Wonderboom Junction, Jacaranda Center, and the Gezina Galleries only being 10 minutes away. Hospitals in the area include Eugene Marais Life Hospital and the Steve Biko Academic Hospital.

The climate is subtropical at the slopes of the Witwatersberg (Malherbe and Venter Street). The location, due to the Pretoria National Zoo, offers plenty of bird life.

Trouw Street and Flowers Street (both part of the M8 route) run through Capital Park and are important lanes between the northeast and western suburbs of Pretoria. Paul Kruger Street (part of the R101 Route) serves as the main route between northern suburbs and the Pretoria Central Business Center. Capital Park is commonly known as a favourite neighbourhood for the capital's artist community. Capital Park is about 2 km from the Tshwane University of Technology (TUT) and a favourite student district. Capital Park is also home to the terminus of the world-renowned Rovos Rail luxury cruise train, which transports passengers in comfort to Cape Town, Dar es Salaam, Durban, or Victoria Falls.

In 2002 local artists found a bust of a woman (Beaula), by local artist Johan Blignaut, "illegally" in the Apies River. The erection of the bust enjoyed wide media coverage. The Tshwane Metro Council notified local artists in writing to remove the bust within 7 days or accept liability for costs incurred by the Metro Council to remove it. Resistance by the local community, as well as wide media coverage, ensured that Beaula could acquire a permanent home in Capital Park. However, Beaula disappeared inexplicably in the following year (2003) after the mighty Apies River was in flood. A copy of the original Beaula image was given a permanent resting place next to the Apies River in 2003.

The Metro Council's reaction to the placement of the Beaula statue had a positive impact on Capital Park. At the end of November 2002, the Capital Meander Art Trail was established in Capital Park, aiming to promote local artists' art and to establish Capital Park as the "city of art" of the capital. The art trail consists of a variety of art galleries, coffee houses, the Mimi Coertse Museum for Afrikaans and a wine cellar.
