= Daspoort Tunnel =

Road tunnel in Pretoria, South Africa

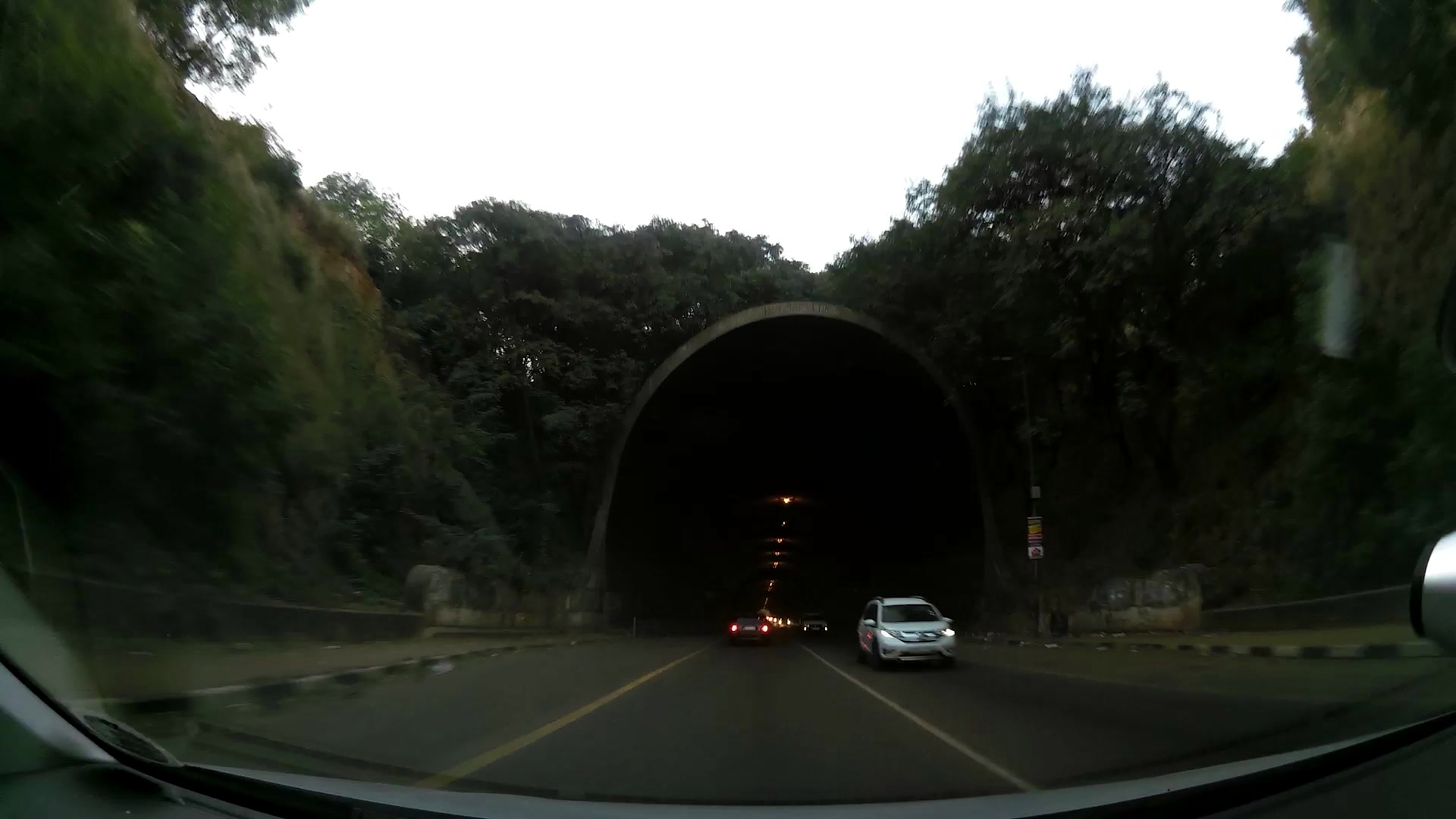
- Daspoort Tunnel southern entrance
- Interactive map of Daspoort Tunnel

Overview
- Official name: Ollie Deneyschen Tunnel
- Location: Danville, Pretoria
- Coordinates: 25.7310°S 28.1350°E
- Route: R55 Transoranje Road
- Start: May 1969

Operation
- Opened: 10 August 1972
- Owner: City of Tshwane Metropolitan Municipality

Technical
- Design engineer: Van Niekerk, Kleyn & Edwards
- Length: 573 m
- No. of lanes: 2
- Operating speed: 60 km/h
- Tunnel clearance: 7.5 m
- Width: 11.6 m

The Ollie Deneyschen Tunnel, usually called the Daspoort Tunnel is a road tunnel in Pretoria, South Africa. It connects the suburbs of Claremont and Danville. It was constructed after Pretoria City Councillor A.P. Deneyschen noticed that Iscor workers living in Hercules were forced to travel a long distance to work. Construction of the tunnel took 40 months, and cost R1.7 million. It was opened on 10 August 1972 by Mayor of Pretoria GJ Malherbe. It has a length of 573 m, width of 11.6 m, a height of 7.5 m in the middle and 13.6 m at the ends, and has a capacity of 6000 vehicles a day. The tunnel lies on the R55 regional route. Currently, the tunnel is used by commuters from the Claremont and Danville regions to travel to the Pretoria CBD and Pretoria North regions and beyond.

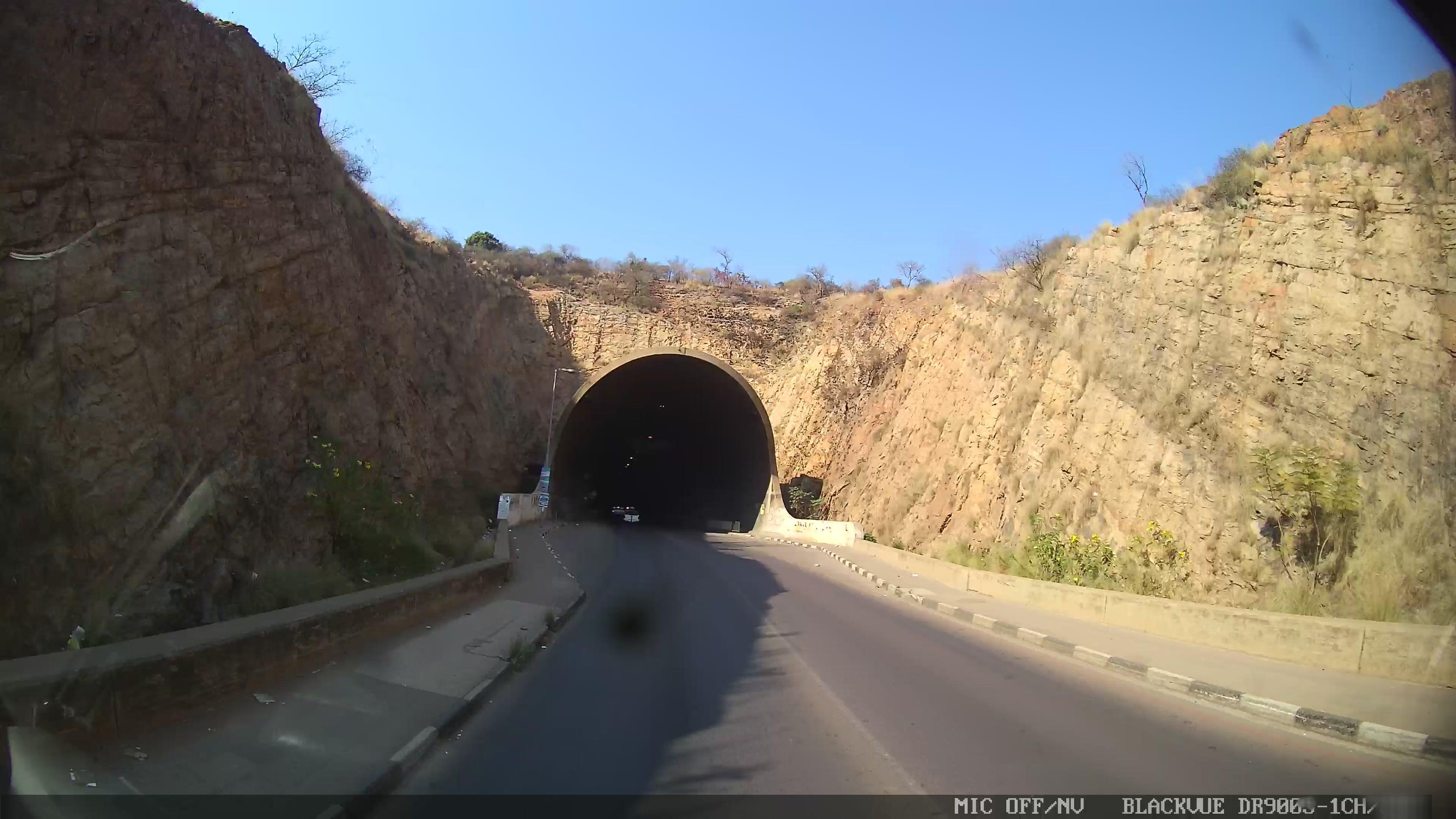
Northern entrance

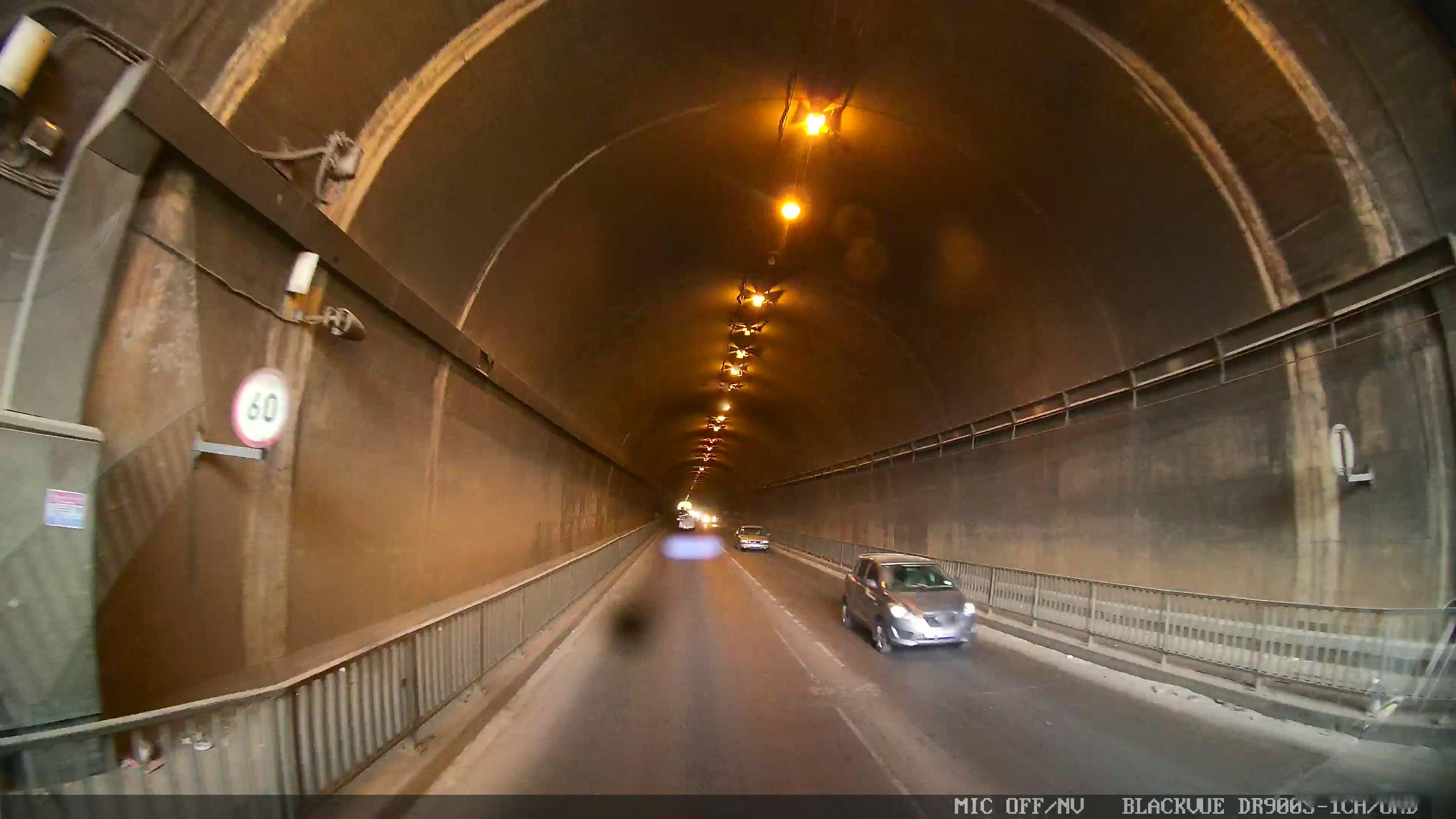
Northern entrance (inside)
