= Christa Steyn =

South African musician (1958–2012)

Christa Stein
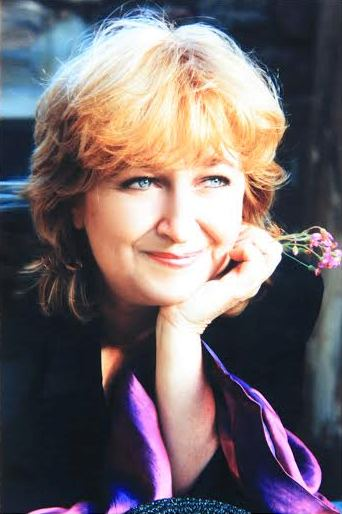
- Born: Christina Maria Schutte; June 15, 1958; Krugersdorp, South Africa
- Died: June 11, 2012 (aged 53); Wingate Park, Pretoria
- Years active: 1986-2011
- Website: http://www.christasteyn.co.za/

Christa Steyn, born Christina Maria Schutte, (15 June 1958, Krugersdorp – 11 June 2012, Pretoria) was a composer, pianist, and Afrikaans singer. She is best known for her work with Jannie du Toit (among others in the production Jannie en die Tannie). Her compositions and arrangements helped establish several artists, including Anneli van Rooyen, Karin Hougaard, and Jan de Wet.

== Biography ==
Christa Steyn learned to play the piano from her mother, Myra Schutte. Her father was the NG minister Dr. Ben Schutte who, among other things, served three different congregations in Potchefstroom. In 1962, at the age of four, she already accompanied her nursery school's choir singing Die Oukraalliedjie without her mother knowing about it.

She studied music at the PU for CHO and started piano lessons with prof. Pieter de Villiers. She initially struggled with music theory, but passed her theory exam in 1972 with distinction.

In 1973 she won the Collegium Musicum competition for 3 consecutive years. In 1981, her first six songs (as a solo singer), among others Eerste Liefde and Bly By My, were recorded. In 1982 and 1984 she won Crescendo 's composition division. In 1986, her first album appeared, Aan die Eiende van die Rênboog .

In 1988 she was appointed as music director of Crescendo where she served until 1993. In 1991 she was appointed as the course leader of the ATKV 's Light Song Workshop until 2000. In 2004 she was named by the ATKV as the Afrikaans Songwriter of the year .

From 1986 she worked for the next 25 years as pianist and co-artist with Jannie du Toit on stage, in studios and as co-writer of songs. Together they visit 25 countries and perform in 21 of them. Their most popular stage productions include Blik en Snaar (1986), Shadows on the Wall (1992), De Kleine Man (1994), Musiek en Repliek – Class of '79 (with Lucas Maree, 1999), De Kleine Man Spoorloos (2000 ), Night Office (together with several other artists under the direction of Sandra Prinsloo and with a text by PG du Plessis, 2004), Jannie en die Tannie (2006), Hartsnaar(with her son, Douw Steyn, Mariëtte Galjaard and Werner Spies, 2008), Houtkruis (with various artists, 2008) and Brel in Brooklyn (with Laurika Rauch and Sergio Zampolli, 2010).

Christa died on June 11, 2012, after being diagnosed with cancer almost exactly a year earlier.

== Discography ==
- Jannie and the Aunt, Two Musicians – 20 Years DVD, 2005/2006 SELECT
- My Hits, 2004 EMI
- Christa plays the "oldies", 2002
- Rondo, 1999 ANZ/JNS
- Baroque for Babies, 1997/1999
- Strings for Snuiters compilation, 1996/1998 EMI
- Christa plays the Masters, 1996 JNS
- Burlesque, 1994 JNS
- Spirit of Ecstasy, 1989 JNS/BRIGADIERS
- Christa Steyn TC/MP, 1987 VENUS
- Take My Hand My Friend / Brave Woman 7", 198? VENUS
- At The End Of The Rainbow TC/LP, 1986

== See also ==
- List of South African musicians
