= Danville, Pretoria =

Danville
- Location within Gauteng Location within South Africa
- Coordinates: 25°44′19″S 28°7′37″E
- Country: South Africa
- Province: Gauteng
- Municipality: City of Tshwane
- Main Place: Pretoria
- Established: 1951

Area
  - Total: 1.24 km^{2} (0.48 sq mi)

Population (2011)
  - Total: 5,650
  - Density: 4,560/km^{2} (11,800/sq mi)

Racial makeup (2011)
  - Black African: 28.5%
  - Coloured: 1.5%
  - Indian/Asian: 0.9%
  - White: 68.6%
  - Other: 0.5%

First languages (2011)
  - Afrikaans: 69.5%
  - Northern Sotho: 5.3%
  - English: 4.9%
  - Tswana: 3.8%
  - Other: 16.5%
- Time zone: UTC+2 (SAST)
- Postal code (street): 0002
- PO box: 0018
- Area code: 012

Danville is a suburb to the west of central Pretoria in the City of Tshwane Metropolitan Municipality.

== History ==
After the suburb's first name of Westlands was rejected, a naming competition was held. The suburb was named Danville after the World War II commander of the Voortrekkerhoogte base, General Daniël Hermanus Pienaar, with the suburb proclaimed in February 1951.

Ever since the end of Apartheid, Danville itself has had a white majority, albeit with an ever-increasing black middle-class.

== Schools ==
In 1956 an Afrikaans and English medium primary school was established in Danville, Pretoria. This school is currently known as Laerskool Generaal Beyers on 102 Du Plessis Street in Danville. This school has been an anchor of the community of Danville for over 60 years and its rich in history and tradition of Danville.

There are 2 more schools in the community of Danville, namely they are Laerskool Westerlig, a primary school that is found on 215 Marsburg Avenue and also Hoerskool Elandspoort, a high school that is found on 140 Albertyn Street in Danville.

Judging by the structure of the education system in Danville, it is possible to recognize that Danville is a primary Afrikaans speaking area. All schools in this area are Afrikaans and English medium.

== Location ==
Danville is found in the Pretoria West area, 5 kilometers from the Church Square, the heart of the Pretoria CBD. Danville lies in the north-west direction from the Voortrekker Monument.

Danville houses the famous Daspoort Tunnel that connects the suburb of Danville and Claremont. It is the only tunnel found in the Gauteng province, and it took 40 months to be constructed. It was opened on 10 August 1972.

== Business ==
Danville houses a number of commercial businesses that cater to the needs of the people of the community. The main retail activity in Danville takes place in the displaced retail center and on the corner of Dan Street and Hepburn Street.

== Transport ==
The City of Tshwane Metropolitan Municipality bus service operates in the Danville area, and it is used by the community members to get to and from town for work or school purposes. The other mode of transport that is mostly used by the community is public taxi; they are mostly used because they are available all the time to transport passengers back and from the Pretoria CBD.

== Landmark ==
There are a handful churches in the area of Danville as many of the community members are religious. There are different churches that are mainly for Afrikaans speaking and seTswana speaking.

Danville has few examples of government-owned infrastructure in the area, like the post office on Heatlie Street that is used by majority of the community. There is also a fire station located on Morkel Street. A hospital that caters to all people of Pretoria West is also found in the Danville area, the Pretoria West Hospital, on the corner of Sytze Wierda Avenue and Morkel Street.

== See also ==
- Daspoort Tunnel, a tunnel that links Danville with Daspoort.
