= Willowridge High School (Pretoria) =

Location
- 518 Verkenner Avenue, Die Wilgers; Pretoria, Gauteng 0143; South Africa
- Coordinates: 25°45′36″S 28°18′51″E

Information
- School type: Public
- Motto: "Strive with Integrity"
- Religious affiliation: Christianity
- Established: 7 January 1987; 39 years ago
- School district: District 4
- School number: +27 (012) 807 3423
- Grades: 8–12
- Gender: Boys & Girls
- Age: 14 to 18
- Schedule: 07:30 - 14:15
- Hours in school day: 6 hours and 35 minutes
- Campus: Urban Campus
- Campus type: Suburban
- Colors: Blue; Red; White
- Nickname: Willowridge
- Team name: Willows
- Rivals: Hoërskool Die Wilgers; The Glen High School
- Accreditation: Gauteng Department of Education
- Website: www.willowridge.co.za

Willowridge High School is a public English co-educational high school situated in the suburb of Die Wilgers in Pretoria in the Gauteng province of South Africa. The school was established in 1987.

== History ==
As early as the start of 1985, a Vigilance Committee was elected at a meeting of prospective parents. Having been named the watchdogs, they monitored the progress of the new school, while the buildings started taking shape on the site that once had been a farm. The school opened its doors on Wednesday, 7 January 1987 to welcome the first 187 pupils in Forms One and Two. During the first term the name Willowridge High School became official and a badge needed to be designed.

The Coat of Arms was approved by the Bureau of Heraldry in 1988 and depicts the name of the school and its inherent philosophy. The shape is that of a spade, symbolising the pioneering spirit with which the school was started. The two willow trees standing on the ridge, nurturing and protecting the Tudor Rose as it blossoms, represent the name of the school.

The first headmaster, Eddie Penzhorn, came to Willowridge High from the Glen High School. In 1991, the second headmaster, Jack Birkenbach, was appointed. In 2005, the third headmaster, Andre du Plessis was appointed.

== Academics ==
Academic learning is the first responsibility of the school.

Willowridge High School offers various subjects, including English, Afrikaans, Sepedi, and Xitsonga and isiZulu, Mathematics, Mathematical Literacy, Physical Science, Information Technology, Computer Application Technology (CAT), Economics, Economical Management Sciences, Life Orientation, Business Studies, History, Geography, Tourism, Natural Science, Visual Art (Art), Design, Consumer studies, Life Sciences (Biology), Hospitality Studies (Hotel), Dramatic Arts (Drama), Technology, Sport Science, Accounting, and Design.

== Sport ==
Sport is compulsory for junior students but not seniors. For the grade 8 students of the school it is compulsory to attend most of the sport meetings as spectator-supporters.

Sporting facilities include netball facilities, rugby union facilities and cricket facilities, a 25-metre swimming pool, athletics grounds, gym, several tennis and netball courts, a basketball court (outdoor), a rock-climbing wall and hockey fields.

Willowridge High School is part of the Pretoria English Medium High Schools Athletics Association (PEMHSAA). The schools have three meetings a year, including the Swimming Gala (held at Hillcrest Swimming Pool), cross country (held at the host school) and an athletics meeting held at Pilditch Stadium.

== Alumni ==
• Roland Schoeman, Summer Olympic games gold medalist swimmer
