= Waverley, Pretoria =

Waverley
- Location within Gauteng Location within South Africa
- Coordinates: 25°41′51″S 28°15′47″E
- Country: South Africa
- Province: Gauteng
- Municipality: City of Tshwane
- Main Place: Pretoria

Area
  - Total: 4.01 km^{2} (1.55 sq mi)

Population (2011)
  - Total: 9,253
  - Density: 2,310/km^{2} (5,980/sq mi)

Racial makeup (2011)
  - Black African: 9.9%
  - Coloured: 1.5%
  - Indian/Asian: 0.7%
  - White: 87.2%
  - Other: 0.7%

First languages (2011)
  - Afrikaans: 84.2%
  - English: 8.8%
  - Northern Sotho: 1.2%
  - Ndebele: 1.4%
  - Other: 4.4%
- Time zone: UTC+2 (SAST)
- Postal code (street): 0186
- PO box: 0135

Waverley is a suburb of the city of Pretoria, South Africa. Located just northeast of the CBD in a leafy, established area that is home to some well-constructed residences on large stands. Its neighbouring suburbs are Rietfontein and Villieria.
