= Sinoville, Pretoria =

Sinoville
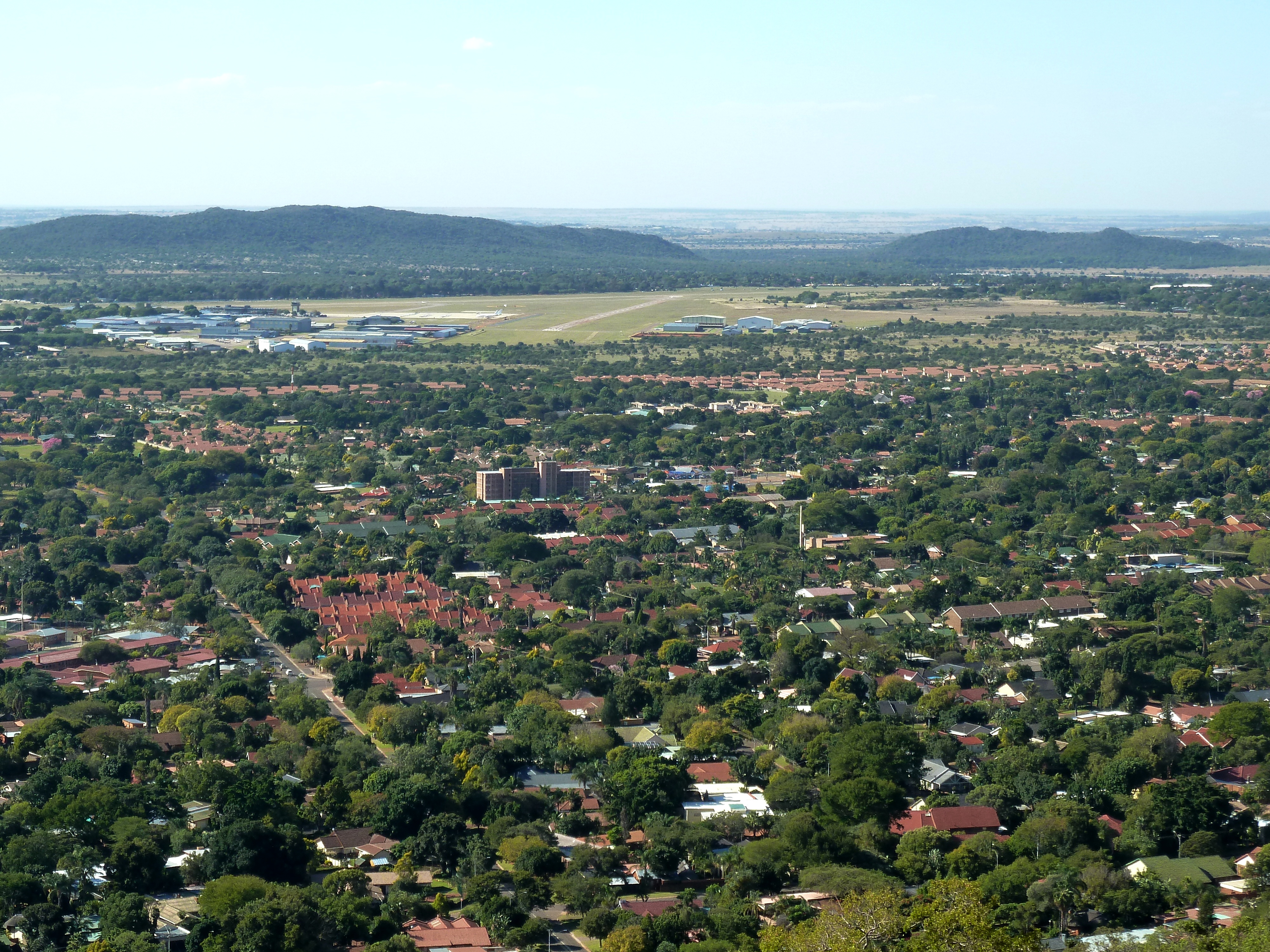
- Sinoville visible to the left

- Location within Gauteng Location within South Africa
- Coordinates: 25°40′44″S 28°13′30″E
- Country: South Africa
- Province: Gauteng
- Municipality: City of Tshwane
- Main Place: Pretoria
- Named for: Sinovich Family

Area
  - Total: 4.55 km^{2} (1.76 sq mi)

Population (2011)
  - Total: 10,058
  - Density: 2,210/km^{2} (5,730/sq mi)

Racial makeup (2011)
  - Black African: 12.0%
  - Coloured: 1.0%
  - Indian/Asian: 0.9%
  - White: 84.6%
  - Other: 1.5%

First languages (2011)
  - Afrikaans: 80.8%
  - English: 11.2%
  - Northern Sotho: 1.5%
  - Tswana: 1.3%
  - Other: 5.2%
- Time zone: UTC+2 (SAST)
- Postal code (street): 0182
- PO box: 0129
- Area code: 012

Sinoville is a northern suburb of Pretoria, South Africa. It lies to the east of the Wonderboom, on the northern slopes of the Magaliesberg mountains, and south of Wonderboom Airport.

== History ==
Sinoville was named after the Sinovich family, immigrants from Croatia. Marija street is named after Mr Sinovich's wife, Marija. A selection of streets in the area are named after members of the family. The original name of Sefako Makgatho Drive was Sinovich Avenue, then renamed Zambesi drive in the 1970s.
