= Mayville, Pretoria =

Mayville
- Location within Gauteng Location within South Africa
- Coordinates: 25°42′17″S 28°11′22″E
- Country: South Africa
- Province: Gauteng
- Municipality: City of Tshwane
- Main Place: Pretoria

Area
  - Total: 1.06 km^{2} (0.41 sq mi)

Population (2011)
  - Total: 2,741
  - Density: 2,590/km^{2} (6,700/sq mi)

Racial makeup (2011)
  - Black African: 17.0%
  - Coloured: 2.2%
  - Indian/Asian: 0.95%
  - White: 79.5%
  - Other: 0.3%

First languages (2011)
  - Afrikaans: 75.5%
  - English: 10.5%
  - Tswana: 2.2%
  - Northern Sotho: 1.8%
  - Other: 9.8%
- Time zone: UTC+2 (SAST)
- Postal code (street): 0084
- PO box: n/a
- Area code: 012

Mayville is a central-western suburb of Pretoria, South Africa (north of the CBD). It is also part of the so-called "Moot" community.
