= Booysens, Pretoria =

Booysens
- Location within Gauteng Location within South Africa
- Coordinates: 25°42′40″S 28°07′33″E
- Country: South Africa
- Province: Gauteng
- Municipality: City of Tshwane
- Main Place: Pretoria
- Established: 1905

Area
  - Total: 1.67 km^{2} (0.64 sq mi)

Population (2011)
  - Total: 3,926
  - Density: 2,350/km^{2} (6,090/sq mi)

Racial makeup (2011)
  - Black African: 15.7%
  - Coloured: 2.1%
  - Indian/Asian: 0.7%
  - White: 81.3%
  - Other: 0.2%

First languages (2011)
  - Afrikaans: 80.8%
  - English: 4.8%
  - Tswana: 3.2%
  - Northern Sotho: 3.2%
  - Other: 8.1%
- Time zone: UTC+2 (SAST)
- Postal code (street): 0082
- PO box: n/a
- Area code: 012

Booysens is a western suburb of Pretoria, South Africa.

== History ==
The suburb lies on an old farm called Zandfontein and was developed from 1905, named after the owner C.H.Z. Booysens.
