= Marabastad, Pretoria =

Marabastad
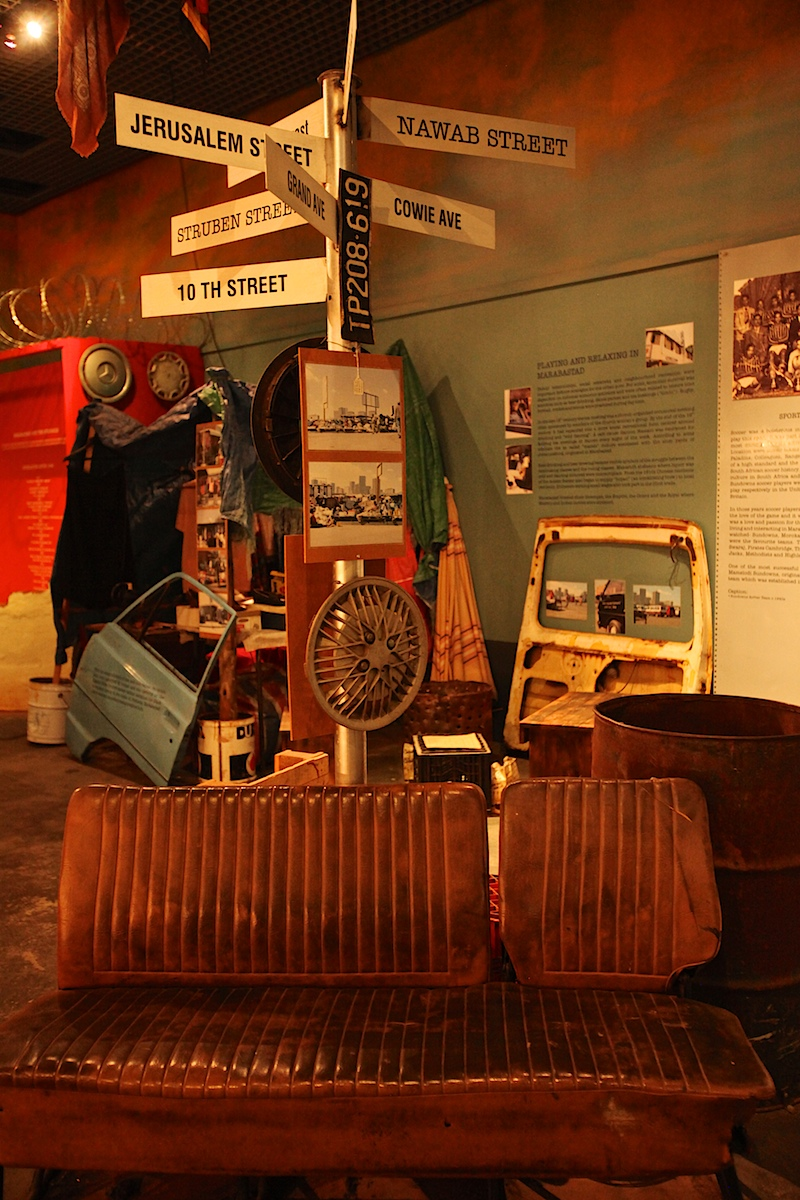
- Marabastad exhibition in the National Cultural History museum in Boom street, Pretoria

- Location within Gauteng Location within South Africa Location within Africa
- Coordinates: 25.7410°S 28.1759°E
- Country: South Africa
- Province: Gauteng
- Municipality: City of Tshwane
- Main Place: Pretoria

Area
  - Total: 0.57 km^{2} (0.22 sq mi)

Population (2011)
  - Total: 339
  - Density: 590/km^{2} (1,500/sq mi)

Racial makeup (2011)
  - Black African: 93.2%
  - Coloured: 1.5%
  - Indian/Asian: 0.3%
  - White: 0.3%
  - Other: 4.7%

First languages (2011)
  - English: 15.8%
  - Xhosa: 12.5%
  - Tsonga: 11.1%
  - Southern Ndebele: 6.1%
  - Other: 54.5%
- Time zone: UTC+2 (SAST)
- Postal code (street): 0002

Marabastad (also called Asiatic Bazaar or Location) is a business area to the west of the city centre of Pretoria, South Africa. The original Maraba Village, situated just to the south of the present Marabastad, was founded and ruled by the Ndebele Chief Maraba. The name Marabastad is the Afrikaans word meaning Maraba's Town.

== Background ==
Marabastad was a culturally diverse community, with the Hindu Mariamman Temple arguably being its most prominent landmark. Like the residents of other racially diverse areas in South Africa, such as District Six, "Fietas" and Sophiatown, the inhabitants of Marabastad were relocated to single-race townships further away from the city centre. These removals were due to Apartheid laws like the Group Areas Act. Unlike Sophiatown, Fietas and District Six, it was not bulldozed, but it retained many of its original buildings, and became primarily a business district, with most shops still owned by the Indians who had also lived there previously. Some property was however owned by the city council and the government, resulting in limited development taking place there. In addition, a large shopping complex was built to house Indian-owned shops.

The black residents of Marabastad were relocated to Atteridgeville (1945), the Coloured residents to Eersterus (1963), and the Indian residents to Laudium (1968). There are plans to revive once-picturesque Marabastad, and to reverse years of urban decay and neglect, although few seem to have been implemented as of 2005.

== History ==
Marabastad was named after the local headman of a village to the west of Steenhoven Spruit. During the 1880s he lived in Schoolplaats and acted as an interpreter. During this period some Africans lived on the farms where they were being employed and also chose to live on other, undeveloped land. Schoolplaats could also not accommodate all the migrants and this resulted in squatting.

An overflow from Schoolplaats to the north-west and Maraba's village occurred and in August 1888 the land was surveyed by the government. The location Marabastad was established and was situated between the Apies River in the north, Skinner Spruit in the west, Steenhoven Spruit in the east and De Korte Street in the south. There were 67 stands varying between 1400 and 2500 square meters each. Residents were not allowed to own stands, but had to rent them from the government at 4 pounds a year. They were allowed to build their own houses and to plant crops on empty plots. Water was acquired from the various bordering rivers and 58 wells situated in the area.

The township was not private owned and was managed by the Transvaal Boer Republic. At the outbreak of the Second Boer War in 1899 there were no rules and regulations with regard to Marabastad. Africans who streamed to Pretoria during the war were living in squatter camps near the artillery barracks, the brickworks and the railway stations at Prinshof. This resulted in the development of ‘New Marabastad’ in the area between Marabastad and the Asiatic Bazaar in 1900 by the British military authorities. They had been occupying the city since June 1900 and resettled refugees in the area. By 1901 there were 392 occupied stands in the New Marabastad and there was no real segregation between Africans, Indians and Coloured people.

Although New Marabastad was intended as a temporary settlement the military authorities granted permission for in their employ to erect brick houses. This resulted in the erection of other permanent structures like schools and churches. The new Town Council was established in 1902 and it was accepted that the residents of New Marabastad would be moved to other, planned townships. In 1903 New Marabastad had grown to 412 stands while Old Marabastad still only had 67. Along with the Cape Location, which was situated in the southern part of the Asiatic Bazaar, it fell under the jurisdiction of the City Council of that year. The greatest problem was the provision of water and this was only addressed after the war. Due to the fear of epidemic all wells in the area had been filled during the war, and a single public tap had replaced the entire system. New Marabastad didn't have any wells or taps. There was an attempt to rectify this in 1903 by providing more taps, but the number was still inadequate.

In 1906 New and Old Marabastad became one location. Rates were determined and sanitary and building regulations came into effect. These regulations didn't achieve their objections as a result of municipal maladministration and the fact that Africans could not own land and afford well-built permanent houses. Streets remained unpaved, the water supply was inadequate and there were no sanitary facilities worth mentioning. More and more shacks appeared. By 1907 conditions improved marginally, but the streets were left in their unkempt state and by 1910 this had still not been addressed. The Native Affairs Department accused the Pretoria Town Council of inefficient administration, which had led directly to this situation.

== Removals ==
The relocation of residents of Old Marabastad had been on the agenda of the town council since 1903 and in 1907, when the council decided to build a new sewage farm, it became a reality. It was decided to remove all residents of the area to a new location further away from the city centre and to demolish the old township. Now followed the struggle of finding a suitable site. The site on the southern slope of Daspoortrand was decided on in 1912 and in January planning for the ‘New Location’ started. It would include a number of brick houses that could be rented from the municipality. By September of the same year the first relocations were taking place and demolishing of old structures commenced. It was a slow process and Old Marabastad was only completely destroyed by 1920.

The lack of space remained a problem and New Marabastad was experiencing severe overcrowding. By 1923 the last houses of the second municipal project was completed in New Location and Marabastad residents who had been exposed to the worst conditions were allowed to move in first. In 1934 part of the Schoolplaats population was moved to Marabastad and the squatter problem became more severe. There was no room for expansion due to a lack of space.

An attempt to solve these problems manifested itself in the establishment of Atteridgeville in 1939. The Marabastad community would be moved here and compensation was offered to previous owners of property in the form of new houses they could rent, but not own. The war slowed the process considerably, but 1949 had moved three quarters of the population of Marabastad to Atteridgeville, and by 1950 the transition was complete.
