= Steve Biko Academic Hospital =

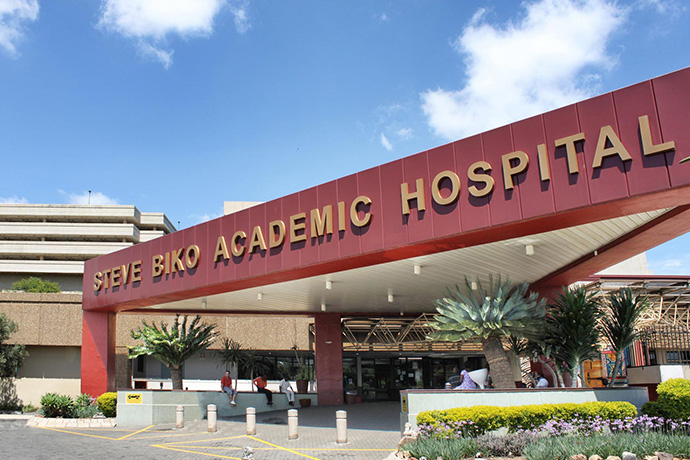

Geography
- Location: Capital Park, Prinshof, Pretoria, Gauteng, South Africa
- Coordinates: 25°43′47″S 28°12′09″E

Organisation
- Care system: Public
- Type: Academic
- Affiliated university: University of Pretoria

Services
- Beds: 832

History
- Founded: 1932

Links
- Website: https://www.sbah.org.za/
- Lists: Hospitals in South Africa

Steve Biko Academic Hospital (formerly the Pretoria Academic Hospital and before 1994 called H F Verwoerd Hospital) of Pretoria, South Africa, previously located at what is now Tshwane District Hospital, is a purely tertiary training healthcare institution. It is the main teaching hospital of the University of Pretoria along with Kalafong Hospital in Atteridgeville to west of the city centre.

The hospital is named after South African anti-apartheid activist Steve Biko.

== History ==
The first healthcare institution for Pretoria, was located near the military barracks in Potgieter Street.

On 21 June 1890 President S. J. Paul Kruger laid the foundation stone of the new 130-bed Volkshospitaal. Despite numerous expansions, and underlined by the flu epidemic of 1918, the hospital became inadequate for the city's population.

On 22 April 1927 the foundation stone was laid for the existing hospital the Pretoria General Hospital. In 1967 it was renamed the H F Verwoerd Hospital, in 1997 to the Pretoria Academic Hospital and finally in 2008 to the Steve Biko Academic Hospital. In 2006 the hospital relocated with the old Pretoria Academic Hospital building becoming the Tshwane District Hospital.

The University of Pretoria Faculty of Health Sciences, established in 1943, formed an academic alliance with the hospital.

== Coat of arms ==
The hospital registered a coat of arms at the Bureau of Heraldry in 1977 : Gules, a caduceus Or surmounted by an amphora enflamed Argent.

== See also ==
- List of hospitals in South Africa
