= Fountains Valley, Pretoria =

Nature reserve in Pretoria, South Africa

Coordinates: 25°46′52″S 28°11′38″E

The Fountains Valley is a recreational resort at the southern entrance to Pretoria in South Africa. It was proclaimed as a nature reserve by President Paul Kruger on 1 February 1895. Consequently, this 60 ha reserve, along with the contiguous Groenkloof Nature Reserve, constitute the oldest nature reserves on the African continent.

The Apies River flows through the resort, and the area has two natural water sources. The resort has various recreational facilities such as a caravan park, swimming pool, lapa, playground and barbecue facilities.

The historic ruins of the house of Lucas Cornelius Bronkhorst (1795–1875) are located near the resort. The Bronkhorst family was part of Hendrik Potgieter's trek party during the Great Trek, and were the first owners of the farms in the district where Pretoria was later established.
