= Die Wilgers =

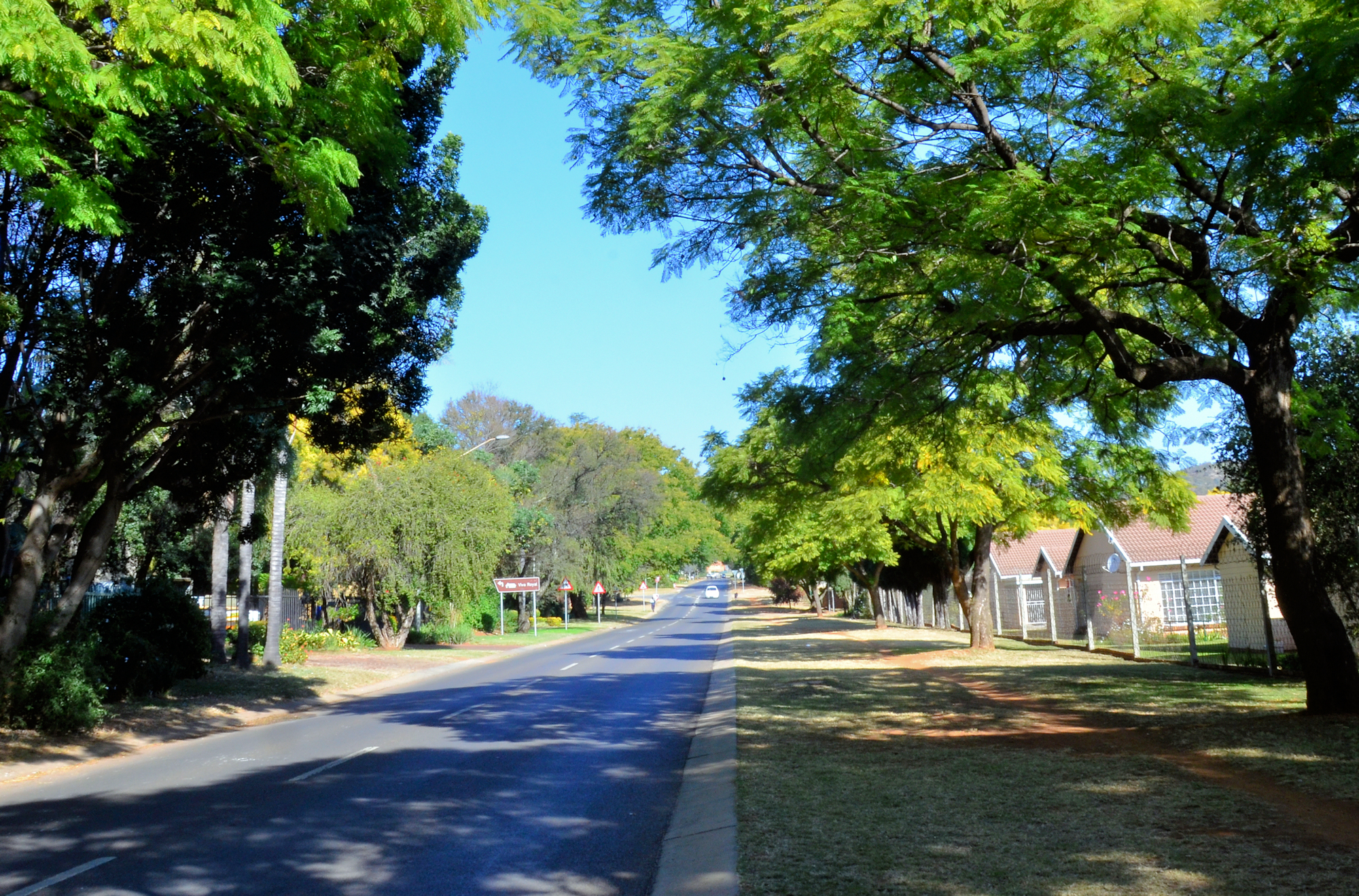
- Swaardlelie Ave in Die Wilgers

- Location within Gauteng Location within South Africa Location within Africa
- Coordinates: 25.759°S 28.314°E
- Country: South Africa
- Province: Gauteng
- Municipality: City of Tshwane
- Main Place: Pretoria

Area
  - Total: 2.86 km^{2} (1.10 sq mi)

Population (2011)
  - Total: 6,856
  - Density: 2,400/km^{2} (6,210/sq mi)

Racial makeup (2011)
  - Black African: 15.4%
  - Coloured: 1.95%
  - Indian/Asian: 2.7%
  - White: 78.0%
  - Other: 1.95%

First languages (2011)
  - Afrikaans: 56.6%
  - English: 25.8%
  - Northern Sotho: 2.1%
  - Other: 15.5%
- Time zone: UTC+2 (SAST)
- Postal code (street): 0184
- PO box: 0041

Die Wilgers is a residential suburb of the city of Pretoria, South Africa, located to the east of Lynnwood Ridge.

== Education ==
- Hoërskool Die Wilgers, Afrikaans medium high school situated in Die Wilgers.
- Willowridge High School, English medium high school situated in Die Wilgers.
- Deutsche Schule Pretoria, German international school (kindergarten through K12) in Die Wilgers.
- Cranefield College, a reputable higher education institution is headquartered in The Willows
