= Villieria =

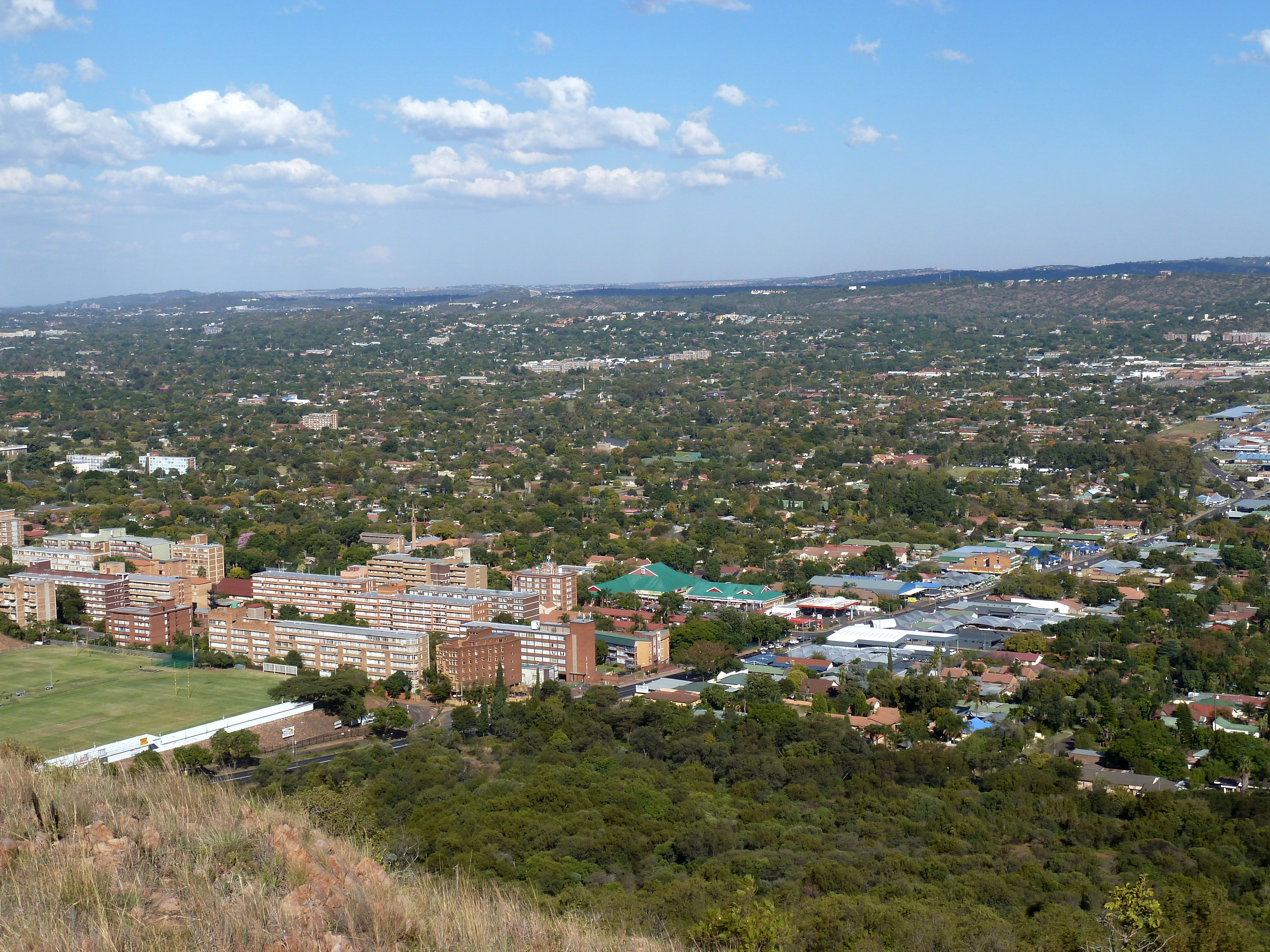
- Villieria seen near the horizon

- Location within Gauteng Location within South Africa Location within Africa
- Coordinates: 25°43′06″S 28°14′44″E
- Country: South Africa
- Province: Gauteng
- Municipality: Tshwane
- Main Place: Pretoria

Area
  - Land: 5.66 km^{2} (2.19 sq mi)

Population (2011)
  - Total: 14,312
- Demonym: Villierian
- Time zone: UTC+2
- Postal Code: 0186

Villieria is a suburb in the northern region of Pretoria. It is bordered by Rietfontein in the north-west and Queenswood in the south-east. The postal code is 0186.

== History ==
Its name comes from Elizabeth "Bettie" de Villiers, the maiden name of the wife of Gideon P. Retief von Wielligh. Von Wielligh was Surveyor-General of the South African Republic and he lived on his estate in Villieria between 1885 and 1898 with his wife and children. Elizabeth was the daughter of Jan S. de Villiers, one of the first music professors when the Cape was colonized, and grand-daughter of G.W.A. van der Linger, the first theology professor. She separated from her husband in August 1899, and they were divorced in 1904. The Von Wielligh and Retief Streets in Pretoria West are named after her husband.

Originally a European settlement it was laid out in 1896 on what had been the Rietfontein farm. Von Wielligh had bought it in 1885 and called it Villieria farm, cultivating bees there from 1894 to 1895, but by 1895 had lost his job and was heavily in debt. The farm having been plundered during the Anglo-Boer War whilst von Wielligh was imprisoned by the British in Pretoria, it was broken up into town plots and was turned into a suburb of Pretoria.

For a while, beginning in 1907, it along with several other later-to-be suburbs was part of the separate municipality of Innesdale, before becoming a part of Pretoria proper in 1931.

== Residential explosion ==
On 10 October 2000 an explosion occurred in Villeria, at the house of Derrick Barrett who worked for a rock-blasting company. It killed four people, including Barret's wife Louisa, his neighbour Hans Werner, and a gardner George Makhubela; and it critically injured two others, including Barrett's then secretary Marlene van Niekerk. Three houses were destroyed in the blast and a further six were declared unsafe. Barrett was arrested soon thereafter, but after a lengthy court process that included his being found guilty in April 2003, appeals postponed his sentencing to 2005, then to 2007 and 2009. His son tried to take the blame in 2010, but Barrett was finally jailed on 22 February 2011 for manslaughter and possession of explosives on an unlicensed premises.

== See also ==
- Pierneef Theatre
