= Silverton, Pretoria =

Silverton
- Location within Gauteng Location within South Africa
- Coordinates: 25°43′54″S 28°18′20″E
- Country: South Africa
- Province: Gauteng
- Municipality: City of Tshwane
- Main Place: Pretoria
- Established: 1890

Area
  - Total: 4.38 km^{2} (1.69 sq mi)

Population (2011)
  - Total: 9,590
  - Density: 2,190/km^{2} (5,670/sq mi)

Racial makeup (2011)
  - Black African: 40.1%
  - Coloured: 9.0%
  - Indian/Asian: 1.6%
  - White: 48.0%
  - Other: 1.5%

First languages (2011)
  - Afrikaans: 52.6%
  - English: 15.3%
  - Northern Sotho: 6.4%
  - Southern Sotho: 5.1%
  - Other: 20.6%
- Time zone: UTC+2 (SAST)
- Postal code (street): 0084
- PO box: n/a
- Area code: 012

Silverton is an eastern suburb of Pretoria, South Africa. It lies wedged between the slopes of the Magaliesberg mountain range.

Rain showers over Silverton in Pretoria.

== History ==
The suburb was established in 1890. During the depression, the town's nickname was Blikkiesdorp because of the numerous shanty dwellings inhabited by poor white farmers. It remained independent of Pretoria until it was incorporated into the city in 1964.
