= Prinshof =

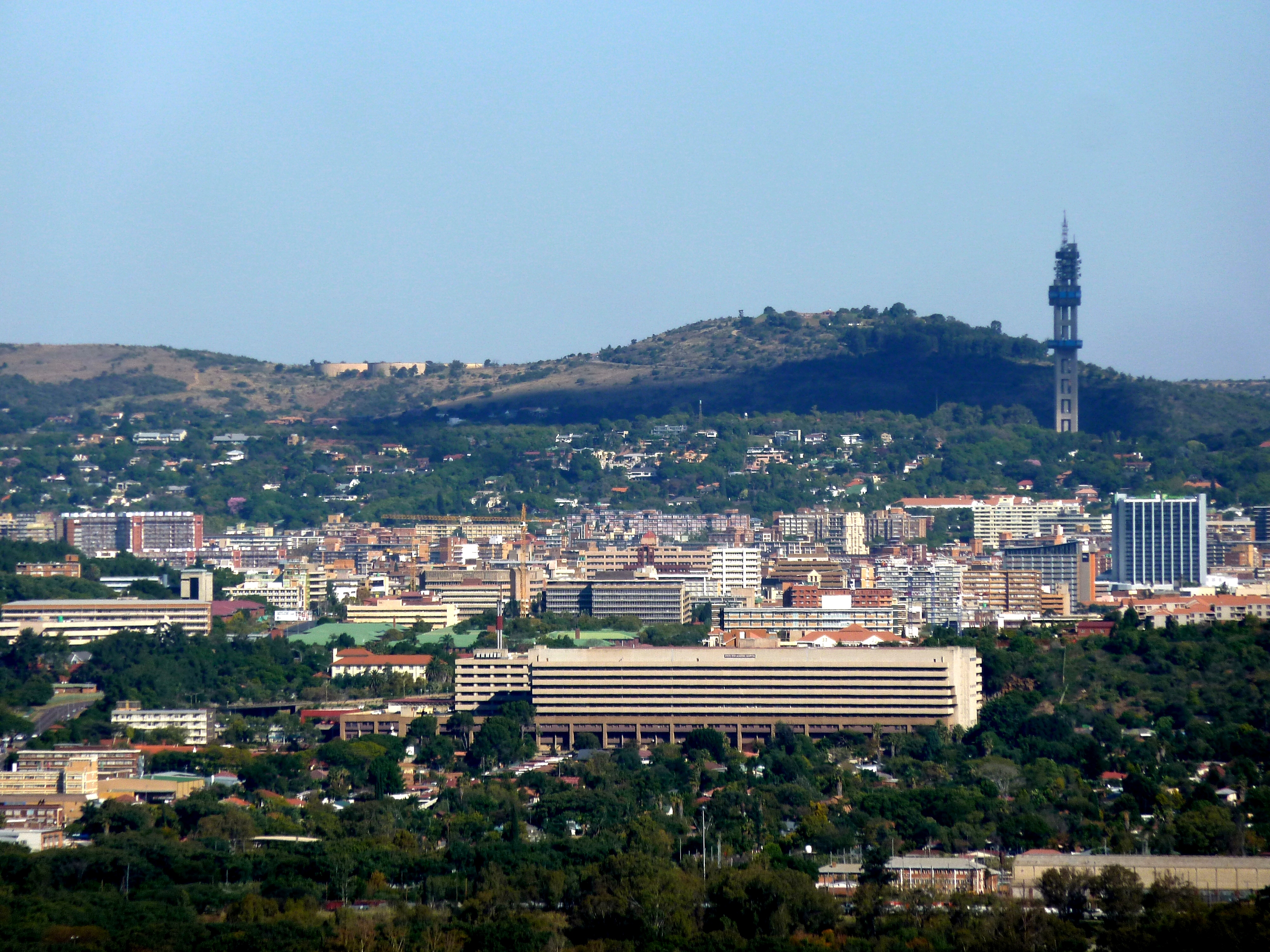
- Prinshof

- Location within Gauteng Location within South Africa
- Coordinates: 25.734°S 28.199°E
- Country: South Africa
- Province: Gauteng
- Municipality: City of Tshwane
- Main Place: Pretoria

Area
  - Total: 1.46 km^{2} (0.56 sq mi)

Population (2011)
  - Total: 2,970
  - Density: 2,030/km^{2} (5,270/sq mi)

Racial makeup (2011)
  - Black African: 71.6%
  - Coloured: 4.9%
  - Indian/Asian: 2.1%
  - White: 20.9%
  - Other: 0.5%

First languages (2011)
  - English: 15.6%
  - Northern Sotho: 15.3%
  - Afrikaans: 15.1%
  - Tswana: 10.2%
  - Other: 43.9%
- Time zone: UTC+2 (SAST)

Prinshof is an area in Pretoria. It is the home of the Faculty of Health Sciences of the University of Pretoria and the Steve Biko Hospital (formerly the Pretoria Academic Hospital).

Prinshof is also the name of a school in Pretoria for partially sighted children.
