= Pretoria West =

Suburb of Pretoria, South Africa

Coordinates: 25°44′46″S 28°09′34″E

Pretoria West Pretoria-Wes
- Suburb
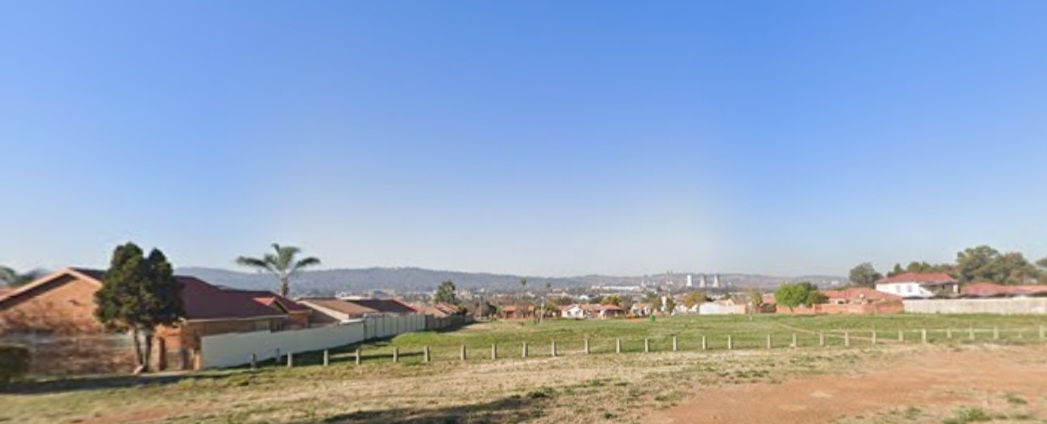
- Pretoria West seen from Staatsartillerie Road.
- Interactive map of Pretoria West
- Country: South Africa
- Province: Gauteng
- Municipality: City of Tshwane
- Main Place: Pretoria

Government
  - Body: City of Tshwane Metropolitan Municipality

Population
  - Total: 11,000+

Pretoria West is a suburb of Pretoria, South Africa, situated 8.1 kilometres (5.0 mi) from the city centre. According to the 2011 census, it has a population of 11,535 (1,869.99 per km²).

== Notable companies ==
Notable companies based in Pretoria West include:

- Pretoria Metal Pressings
- Exxaro
