= Arcadia, Pretoria =

Suburb in Pretoria, South Africa

Arcadia
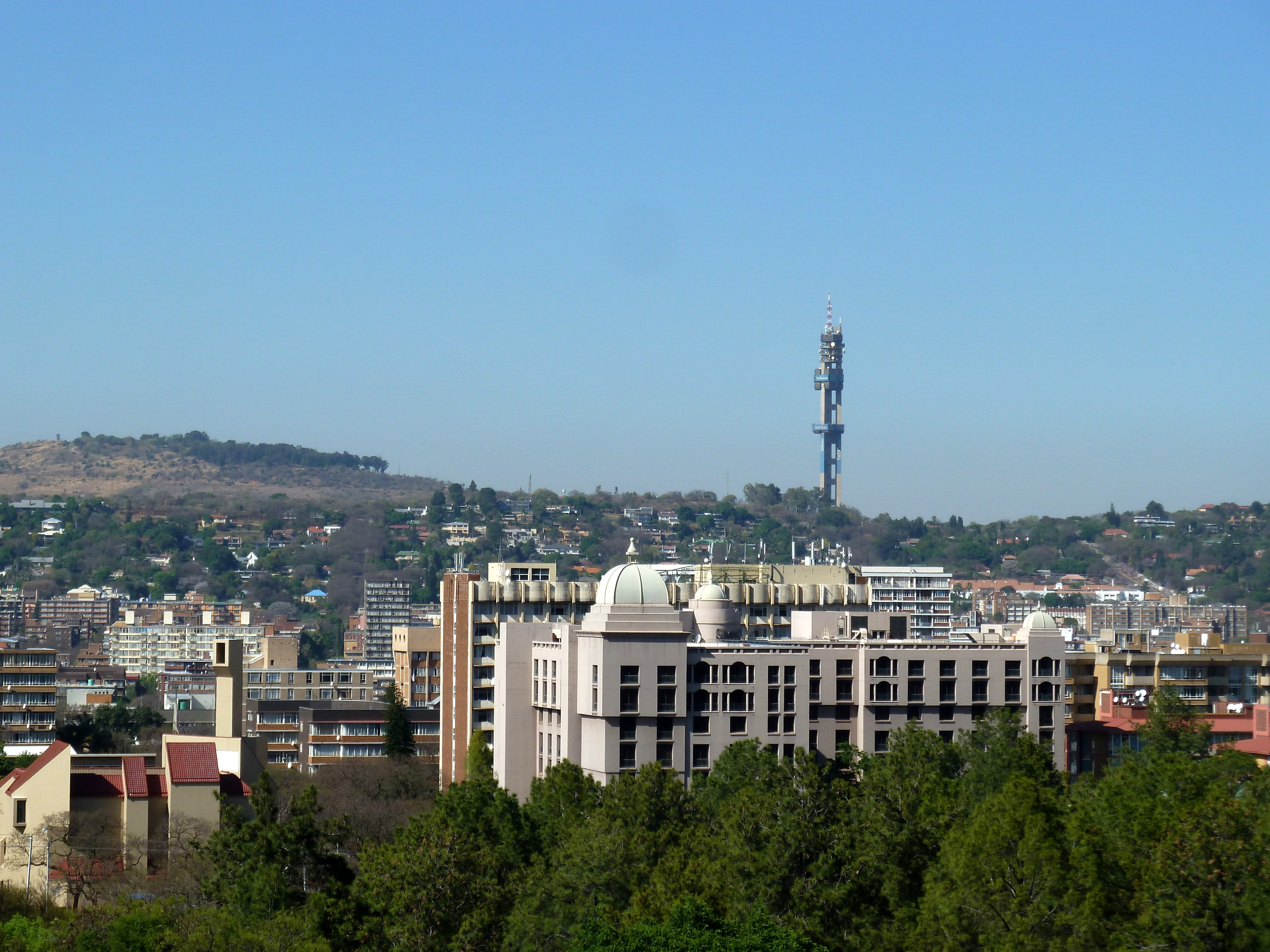
- Sheraton Hotel and Lukasrand Tower

- Location within Gauteng Location within South Africa
- Coordinates: 25.746°S 28.221°E
- Country: South Africa
- Province: Gauteng
- Municipality: City of Tshwane
- Main Place: Pretoria
- Established: 1857/8

Area
  - Total: 2.94 km^{2} (1.14 sq mi)

Population (2011)
  - Total: 23,404
  - Density: 7,960/km^{2} (20,600/sq mi)

Racial makeup (2011)
  - Black African: 80.2%
  - Coloured: 3.6%
  - Indian/Asian: 1.7%
  - White: 12.5%
  - Other: 1.9%

First languages (2011)
  - English: 18.6%
  - Northern Sotho: 14.0%
  - Tswana: 11.6%
  - Afrikaans: 9.6%
  - Other: 46.2%
- Time zone: UTC+2 (SAST)
- Postal code (street): 0083
- PO box: 0007

Arcadia is a suburb in Pretoria, South Africa, that is known for its historical buildings, embassies and hotels. The Union Buildings and the president's residence are also situated here.

== History ==
The land on which the suburb lies had the name originally and so it remained after the land was surveyed in 1857/58 by AF du Toit.

== Geography ==
It is immediately east of the Pretoria CBD. The main thoroughfare is Park Street. Landmarks on Park Street are The Pretoria Art Museum in its Mid-Century Modernist building, The Gerard Moerdyk Restaurant which serves traditional colonial African fare in a house built in 1920 by this famous architect, as well as Loftus Versfeld Stadium where local and international rugby and soccer matches are played.

== Education ==
The Ecole Miriam Makeba, a campus of the Lycée Jules Verne French international school, is in Arcadia. The University of Pretoria is also near Arcadia. High schools in the area include Pretoria High School for Girls, Pretoria Boys High School, Afrikaanse Hoër Meisieskool, Afrikaanse Hoër Seunskool and Pretoria Technical High School.
