= List of members of the 6th Gauteng Provincial Legislature =

6th Gauteng Provincial Legislature
←	5th Legislature	7th Legislature	→
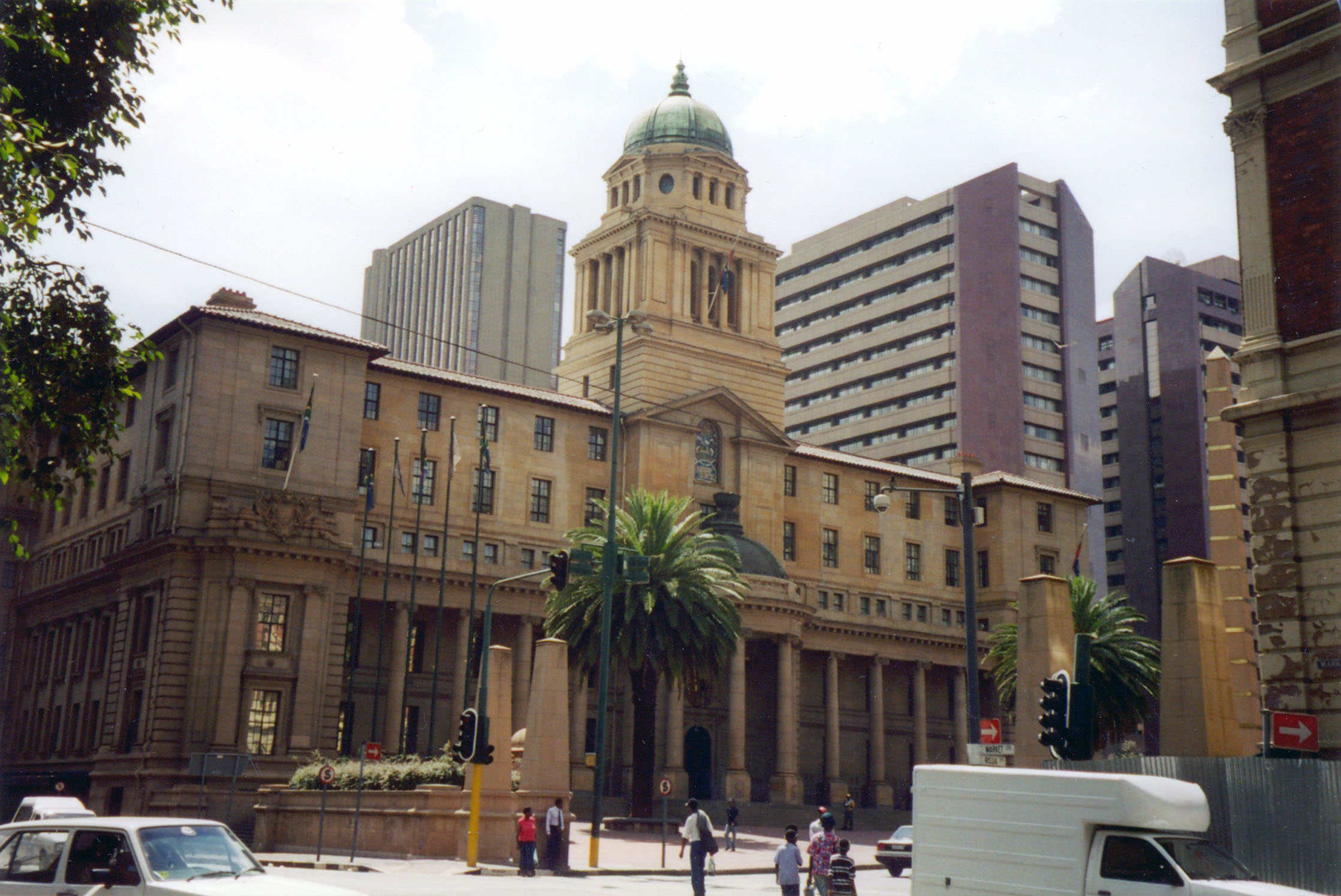
- Johannesburg City Hall

Overview
- Legislative body: Gauteng Provincial Legislature
- Jurisdiction: Gauteng, South Africa
- Meeting place: Johannesburg City Hall
- Term: 22 May 2019 – 28 May 2024
- Election: 8 May 2019
- Members: 73
- Speaker: Ntombi Mekgwe
- Deputy Speaker: Nomvuyo Mhlakaza-Manamela
- Premier: Panyaza Lesufi
- Leader of the Opposition: Solly Msimanga

This is a list of members of the sixth Gauteng Provincial Legislature, as elected in the election of 8 May 2019 and taking into account changes in membership since the election. The legislature dissolved at midnight on 28 May 2024 and was succeeded by the 7th legislature.

== Current composition ==
Party	Seats
African National Congress	37
DA	20
Economic Freedom Fighters	11
VF+	3
Inkatha Freedom Party	1
African Christian Democratic Party	1
Total	73

== Graphical representation ==
This is a graphical comparison of party strengths as they are in the 6th Gauteng Provincial Legislature.

- Note this is not the official seating plan of the Gauteng Provincial Legislature.

== Members ==
Name	Party	Position
Dulton Adams	ACDP	Member
Anton Alberts	FF+	Member
Beverley Badenhorst	EFF	Member
Jack Bloom	DA	Member
Crezane Bosch	DA	Member
Kingsol Chabalala	DA	Member
Matome Chiloane	ANC	Member
Ina Cilliers	DA	Member
Mervyn Cirota	DA	Member
Amanda de Lange	FF+	Member
Bonginkosi Dhlamini	IFP	Member
Kedibone Diale	ANC	Member
Nico de Jager	DA	Member
Sérgio Dos Santos	DA	Member
Bronwynn Engelbrecht	DA	Member
Alan Fuchs	DA	Member
Makashule Gana	DA	Member
Fasiha Hassan	ANC	Member
Mbali Hlophe	ANC	Member
Jacobus Hoffman	FF+	Member
Mpapa Kanyane	ANC	Member
Refiloe Kekana	ANC	Member
Sochayile Khanyile	ANC	Member
Mzikayifane Khumalo	ANC	Member
Moses Koma	EFF	Member
Dolly Ledwaba	ANC	Member
Malesela Ledwaba	EFF	Member
Panyaza Lesufi	ANC	Premier
Boitumelo Letsoalo	ANC	Member
Thokozile Magagula	ANC	Member
Lebogang Maile	ANC	Member
Lesego Makhubela	ANC	Member
Duitso Malema	ANC	Member
Emelda Malobane	ANC	Member
Jacob Mamabolo	ANC	Member
Nomvuyo Manamela	ANC	Deputy Speaker
Ruth Masemola	EFF	Member
Bandile Masuku	ANC	Member
William Matsheke	ANC	Member
Faith Mazibuko	ANC	Member
Cecil Mazwi	EFF	Member
Ntombi Mekgwe	ANC	Speaker
Matshidiso Mfikoe	ANC	Member
Busisiwe Mncube	ANC	Member
Mpho Modise	ANC	Member
Mamsie Mofama	EFF	Member
Maphefo Mogale-Letsie	ANC	Member
Nomathemba Mokgethi	ANC	Member
Nkele Molapo	DA	Member
Lebogang More	DA	Member
Michael Moriarty	DA	Member
Morakane Mosupyoe	ANC	Member
Tasneem Motara	ANC	Member
Joe Mpisi	ANC	Member
Solly Msimanga	DA	Member
Itani Mukwevho	EFF	Member
Tshilidzi Munyai	ANC	Member
Alphina Ndlovana	ANC	Member
Thulani Ndlovu	ANC	Member
Fred Nel	DA	Member
Nomantu Nkomo-Ralehoko	ANC	Member
Refiloe Nt'sekhe	DA	Member
Wildri Peach	DA	Member
Mauwane Phaladi-Digamela	ANC	Member
Njakazana Radebe	EFF	Member
Khume Ramulifho	DA	Member
Adriana Randall	DA	Member
Greg Schneemann	ANC	Member
Michael Shackleton	DA	Member
Gloria Tong	EFF	Member
Azwiambwi Tshitangano	EFF	Member

In the ANC caucus, former members included Thuliswa Nkabinde-Khawe (died November 2019), Kgosientso Ramokgopa (resigned November 2019), Mapiti Matsena (died July 2020), Dumisani Dakile (sworn in June 2019, resigned November 2020), Lindiwe Lasindwa (died August 2021), former Premier David Makhura (resigned October 2022), and Petrus Mabunda (resigned February 2023). Parks Tau was elected to a seat in May 2019 but left to join the national government shortly after the beginning of the legislative term; he returned to the provincial legislature in November 2020, but resigned again in February 2023. In addition to Dakile and Tau, other midterm additions to the legislature included Thulani Ndlovu (from November 2019, replacing Nkabinde-Khawe); Greg Schneemann (from August 2020); Maphefo Mogale-Letsie (September 2021); and Tshilidzi Munyai and Matshidiso Mfikoe, who replaced Mabunda and Tau (February 2023).

In the DA caucus, former members included John Moodey (resigned September 2020) and Michael Shackleton (resigned April 2022), both of whom defected to ActionSA.
