= List of members of the 7th Gauteng Provincial Legislature =

This is a list of members of the 7th Gauteng Provincial Legislature, elected in the 2024 provincial election and taking membership changes into account.

The legislature convened for the first time on 14 June 2024 which saw Panyaza Lesufi of the African National Congress re-elected as premier, Morakane Mosupyoe of the ANC elected as speaker, and Refiloe Nt'sekhe of the Democratic Alliance elected as deputy speaker. Nt'sekhe later resigned after the DA and ANC failed to reach a coalition agreement and was replaced with Nomvuyo Mhlakaza-Manamela from the ANC.

== Members ==
This is a list of members of the provincial legislature, as of 14 June 2024:

Name	Party	Position
Remonde Abrahams	EFF	Member
Dulton Adams	ACDP	Member
Anton Alberts	FF+	Member
Ayanda Allie	BOSA	Member
Jack Bloom	DA	Member
Crezane Bosch	DA	Member
Kingsol Chabalala	DA	Member
Matome Chiloane	ANC	Member
Tlou Chokoe	ANC	Member
Ina Cilliers	DA	Member
Mervyn Cirota	DA	Member
Nico de Jager	DA	Member
Leanne de Jager	DA	Member
Bonginkosi Dhlamini	IFP	Member
Kedibone Diale	ANC	Member
Neville Dilebo	MK	Member
Sérgio Dos Santos	DA	Member
Evert du Plessis	DA	Member
Bronwynn Engelbrecht	DA	Member
Louisa Evans	PA	Member
Alan Fuchs	DA	Member
Madeleine Hicklin	DA	Member
Mbali Hlophe	ANC	Member
Vuyiswa Jentile	ANC	Member
Mzikayifane Khumalo	ANC	Member
Moses Koma	EFF	Member
Thulani Kunene	ANC	Member
Panyaza Lesufi	ANC	Premier
Boitumelo Letsoalo	ANC	Member
Boitumelo Mahlabe	MK	Member
Lebogang Maile	ANC	Member
Boitumelo Makhene	EFF	Member
Lesego Makhubela	ANC	Member
Phillip Makwala	EFF	Member
Jeanette Maloka	EFF	Member
Jacob Mamabolo	ANC	Member
Lindiwe Masilela	EFF	Member
Malebogeng Masoleng	EFF	Member
Bandile Masuku	ANC	Member
Faith Mazibuko	ANC	Member
Ntombi Mekgwe	ANC	Member
Nomthandazo Meso	MK	Member
Matshidiso Mfikoe	ANC	Member
Nomvuyo Mhlakaza-Manamela	ANC	Deputy Speaker
Jade Miller	DA	Member
Lindiwe Mkhwanazi	MK	Member
Ntsako Mogobe	ANC	Member
Nomathemba Mokgethi	ANC	Member
John Moodey	ActionSA	Member
Emma More	ActionSA	Member
Mike Moriarty	DA	Member
Andiswa Mosai	ANC	Member
Morakane Mosupyoe	ANC	Speaker
Tasneem Motara	ANC	Member
Solly Msimanga	DA	Member
Thulani Ndlovu	ANC	Member
Fred Nel	DA	Member
Frans Ngobeni	EFF	Member
Funzi Ngobeni	ActionSA	Member
Thabang Nkani	MK	Member
Nomantu Nkomo-Ralehoko	ANC	Member
Refiloe Nt'sekhe	DA	Member
Dumisani Nyathi	MK	Member
Sheila Peters	PA	Member
Koketso Poho	EFF	Member
Vuyiswa Ramokgopa	RISE	Member
Khathutshelo Rasilingwane	DA	Member
Ruhan Robinson	DA	Member
Gregory Schneemann	ANC	Member
Mpho Sesedinyane	ANC	Member
Tshepo Seteka	EFF	Member
Nazley Sharif	DA	Member
Meshack Skhosana	MK	Member
Michael Sun	DA	Member
Disego Tlebere	ANC	Member
Michael Waters	DA	Member
Buyisiwe Xaba	MK	Member
