= List of members of the 5th Gauteng Provincial Legislature =

5th Gauteng Provincial Legislature
←	4th Legislature	6th Legislature	→
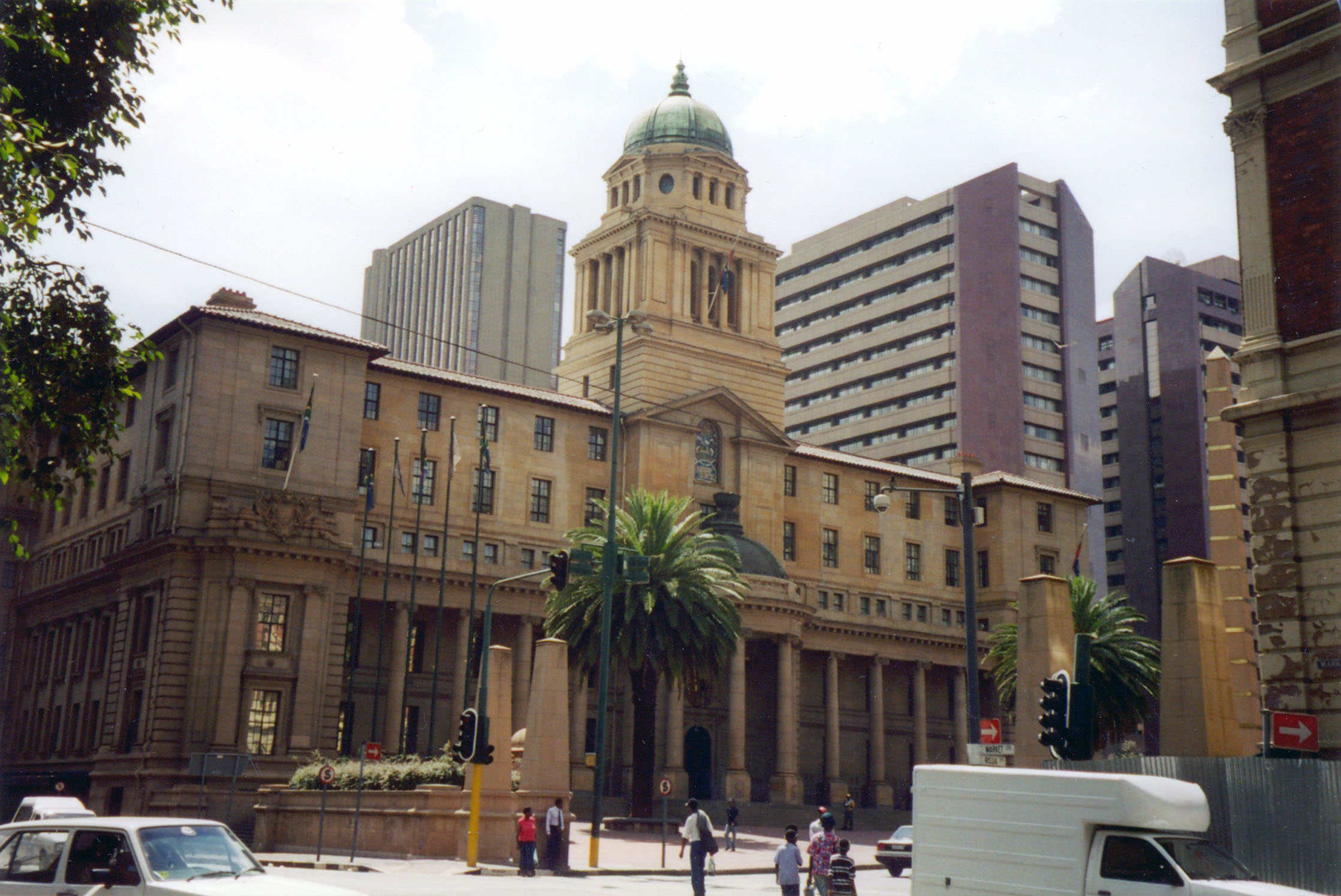
- Johannesburg City Hall

Overview
- Legislative body: Gauteng Provincial Legislature
- Jurisdiction: Gauteng, South Africa
- Meeting place: Johannesburg City Hall
- Term: 21 May 2014 – May 2019
- Election: 7 May 2014
- Members: 73
- Speaker: Ntombi Mekgwe
- Deputy Speaker: Uhuru Moiloa (2014–18); Nomantu Nkomo-Ralehoko (2018–19)
- Premier: David Makhura
- Party control: African National Congress

This is a list of members of the fifth Gauteng Provincial Legislature as elected in the election of 7 May 2014. In that election, the African National Congress (ANC) retained a significantly diminished majority in the legislature, winning 40 of 73 seats. The Democratic Alliance (DA), with 23 seats, retained its status as the official opposition in the legislature. The Economic Freedom Fighters (EFF), a newly established party, became the third-largest party in the province with eight seats, while the Freedom Front Plus (FF+) and Inkatha Freedom Party (IFP) retained one seat apiece. Three other parties – the African Christian Democratic Party, the Congress of the People, and the Independent Democrats – lost their representation in the legislature.

The legislature was constituted on 21 May 2014 and, during its first sitting, it elected the ANC's David Makhura to his first term as Premier of Gauteng. The legislature also elected Ntombi Mekgwe as Speaker and re-elected Uhuru Moiloa as Deputy Speaker. Nomantu Ralehoko was elected as Chairperson of Committees, with Doreen Senokoanyane as her deputy. In later reshuffles of the presiding offices, Ralehoko became Deputy Speaker, Mike Madlala became Chairperson of Committees, and Mpapa Kanyane became Deputy Chairperson of Committees.

== Composition ==
This is a graphical comparison of party strengths as they were in the fifth Gauteng Provincial Legislature.

Party	Seats
African National Congress	40
DA	23
Economic Freedom Fighters	8
VF+	1
Inkatha Freedom Party	1
Total	73

== Members ==
This is a list of members of the fifth legislature as elected in May 2014 but accounting for changes in membership after the election. In addition to changes after the legislature was constituted, several individuals were elected to seats in May 2014 but declined to be sworn in to the legislature. These were Anton Alberts of the FF+ (replaced by Philip van Staden); Dali Mpofu and Omphile Maotwe of the EFF (replaced by Christinah Mabala and Hoffinel Ntobeng); and Eric Xayiya, Nomvula Mokonyane, and Mandla Nkomfe of the ANC (replaced by Thuliswa Nkabinde, Busisiwe Mncube and Mafika Mgcina).

Name	Party	Term start	Term end
Molebatsi Bopape	ANC	May 2014	May 2019
Barbara Creecy	ANC	May 2014	May 2019
Brian Hlongwa	ANC	May 2014	May 2019
Mpapa Kanyane	ANC	May 2014	May 2019
Sochayile Khanyile	ANC	May 2014	May 2019
Sakhiwe Khumalo	ANC	May 2014	May 2019
Jacob Khawe	ANC	May 2014	2017
Lindiwe Lasindwa	ANC	May 2014	May 2019
Panyaza Lesufi	ANC	May 2014	May 2019
Michael Madlala	ANC	May 2014	May 2019
Thokozile Magagula	ANC	May 2014	May 2019
Errol Magerman	ANC	May 2014	May 2019
Gloria Thandi Mahlangu	ANC	May 2014	March 2016
Qedani Mahlangu	ANC	May 2014	February 2017
Lebogang Maile	ANC	May 2014	May 2019
David Makhura	ANC	May 2014	May 2019
Sizakele Malobane	ANC	May 2014	May 2019
Jacob Mamabolo	ANC	May 2014	May 2019
Paul Mashatile	ANC	February 2016	May 2019
Hana Daisy Mashego	ANC	May 2014	May 2019
Nandi Mayathula-Khoza	ANC	May 2014	May 2019
Faith Mazibuko	ANC	May 2014	May 2019
Valentine Mbatha	ANC	May 2014	May 2019
Ntombi Mekgwe	ANC	May 2014	May 2019
Mafika Mgcina	ANC	May 2014	May 2019
Busisiwe Mncube	ANC	May 2014	May 2019
Jacqueline Mofokeng	ANC	May 2014	May 2019
Refilwe Mogale	ANC	May 2014	May 2019
Uhuru Moiloa	ANC	May 2014	May 2019
Nomathemba Mokgethi	ANC	After May 2014	May 2019
Joe Mpisi	ANC	May 2014	May 2019
Nompi Nhlapo	ANC	May 2014	May 2019
Thuliswa Nkabinde	ANC	May 2014	May 2019
Hope Papo	ANC	May 2014	2014
Joyce Pekane	ANC	May 2014	May 2019
Mbongeni Radebe	ANC	May 2014	May 2019
Nomantu Ralehoko	ANC	May 2014	May 2019
Gwen Ramokgopa	ANC	February 2017	May 2019
Caroline Ranoka	ANC	After May 2014	May 2019
Doreen Senokoanyane	ANC	May 2014	February 2016
Maggie Tlou	ANC	May 2014	May 2019
Alfred Tseki	ANC	May 2014	May 2019
Godfrey Tsotetsi	ANC	May 2014	May 2019
Ismail Vadi	ANC	May 2014	May 2019
Jack Bloom	DA	May 2014	May 2019
Neil Campbell	DA	May 2014	May 2019
Kingsol Chabalala	DA	May 2014	May 2019
Ina Cilliers	DA	May 2014	May 2019
Mervyn Cirota	DA	May 2014	May 2019
Michéle Clarke	DA	May 2014	May 2019
Justus de Goede	DA	May 2014	May 2019
Janho Engelbrecht	DA	May 2014	May 2019
Alan Fuchs	DA	May 2014	May 2019
Makashule Gana	DA	November 2016	May 2019
Graham Gersbach	DA	May 2014	May 2019
Katherine Lorimer	DA	May 2014	May 2019
John Moodey	DA	May 2014	May 2019
Lebogang More	DA	May 2014	May 2019
Michael Moriarty	DA	May 2014	May 2019
Solly Msimanga	DA	May 2014	August 2016
Fred Nel	DA	May 2014	May 2019
Refiloe Nt'sekhe	DA	May 2014	May 2019
Nkhumeni Ramulifho	DA	May 2014	May 2019
Adriana Randall	DA	May 2014	May 2019
Ashor Sarupen	DA	May 2014	May 2019
Janet Semple	DA	May 2014	May 2019
Glenda Steyn	DA	May 2014	May 2019
Paul Willemburg	DA	May 2014	May 2019
Benjamin Disoloane	EFF	May 2014	2014
Lindiwe Dzimba	EFF	May 2014	May 2019
Gladwin Khaiyane	EFF	May 2014	December 2018
Malesela Ledwaba	EFF	April 2015	May 2019
Christinah Mabala	EFF	May 2014	May 2019
Serialong Malete	EFF	After May 2014	May 2019
Mandisa Mashego	EFF	May 2014	May 2019
Hoffinel Ntobeng	EFF	May 2014	May 2019
Patrick Sindane	EFF	May 2014	May 2019
Azwiambwi Tshitangano	EFF	After May 2014	May 2019
Mgcini Tshwaku	EFF	May 2014	2017
Phillip van Staden	FF+	May 2014	May 2019
Bonginkosi Dhlamini	IFP	May 2014	May 2019
