= Mzikayifane Khumalo =

South African politician (1972–2026)

Gauteng MEC for Cooperative Governance and Traditional Affairs, eGovernment and Research and Development
- In office 7 October 2022 – 14 June 2024
- Premier: Panyaza Lesufi
- Preceded by: Office established
- Succeeded by: Office abolished

Chief Whip of the Majority Party in the Gauteng Provincial Legislature
- In office 29 May 2019 – 7 October 2022
- Premier: David Makhura
- Preceded by: Sochayile Khanyile
- Succeeded by: Lesego Makhubela

Member of the Gauteng Provincial Legislature
- In office 22 May 2019 – 10 August 2026

Executive Mayor of the Rand West City Local Municipality
- In office August 2016 – 22 May 2019
- Preceded by: Municipality established
- Succeeded by: Dumile Sithole

Executive Mayor of the Randfontein Local Municipality
- In office March 2015 – August 2016
- Preceded by: Sylvia Thebenare
- Succeeded by: Municipality abolished

Personal details
- Born: Mzikayifane Elias Khumalo; 1 January 1972
- Died: 10 August 2026 (aged 54)
- Party: African National Congress

Mzikayifane Elias Khumalo (1 January 1972 – 10 August 2026) was a South African politician for the African National Congress (ANC) who was a member of the Gauteng Provincial Legislature from 2019 until his death in 2026. He served as the chief whip of majority party in the provincial legislature from May 2019 until October 2022 and then as the Gauteng MEC for Cooperative Governance and Traditional Affairs, eGovernment and Research and Development from October 2022 until June 2024. Previously, he had served as the Executive Mayor of the Randfontein Local Municipality from 2015 to 2016 and as the Executive Mayor of the Rand West City Local Municipality from 2016 to 2019.

== Political career ==
A member of the African National Congress, Khumalo served as the Speaker of the Randfontein Local Municipality before he was elected as the Executive Mayor in March 2015, replacing Sylvia Thebenare, who had resigned. Prior to the August 3, 2016 local government elections, Khumalo was chosen to be the ANC's mayoral candidate for the Rand West City Local Municipality, which was established after the election. The ANC won a majority of seats on the council and Khumalo was elected as the inaugural Executive Mayor.

In 2018, he was a candidate for chairperson of the ANC's West Rand Region. He lost to Merafong mayor Maphefo Letsie.

=== Provincial legislature ===
In 2019 he stood for the Gauteng Provincial Legislature as 24th on the ANC's list of candidates. At the election, he won a seat in the legislature. Khumalo resigned as mayor on 22 May 2019, the same day he was sworn in as an MPL. Shortly afterwards, he was appointed the chief whip of the ANC caucus, becoming the Chief Whip of the Majority Party.

On 7 October 2022, Khumalo joined the provincial government as the Member of the Executive Council (MEC) for the Department of Cooperative Governance and Traditional Affairs, eGovernment and Research and Development. Khumalo was not reappointed to the Executive Council following the 2024 provincial election.

== Death ==
Khumalo died on 10 August 2026, at the age of 54.
