= Badenhorst =

Badenhorst is an Afrikaans surname. Notable people with the surname include:

- Anna Lemmer Badenhorst Rudolph (1924–1995), South African author and composer
- Beverley Badenhorst, South African politician
- Brummer Badenhorst (born 1990), South African rugby union player
- Daantjie Badenhorst (born 1967), South African quiz show contestant and writer
- Felix Badenhorst (born 1989), Swazi footballer
- Gerrit Badenhorst (born 1962), South African powerlifter and strongman competitor
- Henry Badenhorst, British businessman
- Joany Badenhorst (born 1994), South African-born Australian Paralympian
- Pieter Badenhorst, South African Paralympic athlete
- Roald Badenhorst (born 1991), South African-born New Zealand cricketer
- Skipper Badenhorst (born 1978), South African rugby union player
- Witkop Badenhorst (1940–2012), South African Army general
