= Bronwynn Engelbrecht =

South African politician and pharmacist (b. 1960)

Bronwynn Engelbrecht MPL

Member of the Gauteng Provincial Legislature
- Incumbent
- Assumed office 18 February 2021

Permanent Delegate to the National Council of Provinces from Gauteng
- In office 4 November 2015 – 7 May 2019

Personal details
- Born: 29 December 1960 (age 65)
- Party: Democratic Alliance
- Children: 4
- Education: University of the North-West (B. Pharm); Gordon Institute of Business Science (MBA)
- Occupation: Politician, pharmacist

Bronwynn Anne Engelbrecht (born 29 December 1960) is a South African politician and pharmacist. A member of the Democratic Alliance, Engelbrecht served as the DA City of Tshwane ward 42 councillor until 2015 when she was appointed as a Permanent Delegate to the National Council of Provinces from Gauteng. After leaving parliament in 2019, Engelbrecht returned to the Tshwane city council as a DA PR councillor. In February 2021 she was sworn in as a member of the Gauteng Provincial Legislature.

== Background ==
Bronwynn Anne Engelbrecht was born on 29 December 1960. She matriculated from Eunice High School for Girls in 1979. She started studying at the University of the North-West in 1982 and graduated with a Bachelor of Pharmacy in 1986. Engelbrecht worked for the pharmacy in Vlok Street, Pretoria from May 1988 to April 1997. She then worked for the Bestmed Medical Scheme as a clinical advisor from October 2002 to July 2003, while completing a Master of Business Administration at the Gordon Institute of Business Science. Between 2005 and 2006, she was a part-time senior lecturer at the University of Limpopo's Medunsa campus. For the next four years, she was a franchisor at BSXI Franchising Enterprises. Engelbrecht was also the owner of the BSXI Hydro Spa from 2004 to 2014.

== Political career ==
Engelbrecht joined the Democratic Alliance and was elected as the councillor for ward 42 in the Tshwane Metropolitan Municipality (Pretoria) in 2011. She served on the municipality's public accounts committee. In September 2015, she applied to be the DA's mayoral candidate in Tshwane for the 2016 elections. She was up against DA Member of the Provincial Legislature, Solly Msimanga, and 2011 mayoral candidate, Brandon Topham for the position. Msimanga was later chosen as the DA's mayoral candidate, however, Engelbrecht was then chosen to become a DA Permanent delegate to the National Council of Provinces from Gauteng. She was sworn into office on 4 November 2015.

In November 2018, the former Mayor of Cape Town, Patricia de Lille, laid charges of defamation, crimen injuria, fraud against Engelbrecht and three other DA members because of a forged post they shared on social media, appearing to be from the Auditor-General.

In May 2019, she stood for election to the Gauteng Provincial Legislature as 23rd on the party's list. The DA won only twenty seats, meaning that Engelbrecht missed out. She did not return to the NCOP. She was then sworn in as a DA PR councillor in Tshwane later in May. In June 2019, it revealed that she and four other DA councillors could be removed if the DA's federal legal commission found that they were irregularly nominated to fill five vacant councillor positions in the city council. The FLC later ruled that they were not irregularly nominated

Engelbrecht was sworn in as a Member of the Gauteng Provincial Legislature on 18 February 2021.
