= Nkele Molapo =

South African politician

Member of the Gauteng Provincial Legislature
- In office 22 May 2019 – 16 October 2020

Personal details
- Other political affiliations: ActionSA (2021–2023); Democratic Alliance (Until 2020)
- Occupation: Politician

Nkele Molapo is a South African politician who represented the Democratic Alliance in the Gauteng Provincial Legislature from May 2019 until her expulsion from the party in October 2020.

== Political career ==
Molapo served as a DA councillor in the Tshwane Metropolitan Municipality and as a Section 79 Oversight Committee Chairperson for Human Settlements before her election to the Gauteng Provincial Legislature in the May 2019 general election. In June 2019, she became a member of the education committee and an alternate member of both the petitions and social development committees. Molapo was expelled from the DA in October 2020 after she had allegedly shared information with the Economic Freedom Fighters while a DA councillor in Tshwane.

In March 2021, she joined Herman Mashaba's newly formed ActionSA as its provincial media manager and Gauteng party chairperson John Moodey's provincial spokesperson.

As a member of ActionSA, she served a councillor in the City of Tshwane Metropolitan Municipality following her election into office in November 2021. She was also a Section 79 Oversight Committee Chairperson for Community Safety.

Molapo was expelled from ActionSA in March 2023 after an internal party investigation found that she had been sharing confidential party information with her husband Abel Tau, who was expelled from ActionSA in November 2022, to help him disparage the party. She was also accused of liking a Facebook post that criticised party leader Herman Mashaba and bullying fellow ActionSA caucus members in Tshwane.

== Personal life ==
In early-October 2020, Molapo accused former Tshwane mayor and DA caucus leader in the legislature, Solly Msimanga, of sexual harassment. She alleged that the incident happened in 2014. Msimanga denied the allegation.

In December 2021, Molapo was a victim of identity theft.
