= Amanda de Lange =

South African politician

Amanda de Lange MPL

Member of the Gauteng Provincial Legislature
- Incumbent
- Assumed office 22 May 2019

Personal details
- Party: Freedom Front Plus
- Occupation: Member of the Provincial Legislature
- Profession: Politician

Amanda de Lange is a South African politician who has been serving as a Member of the Gauteng Provincial Legislature for the Freedom Front Plus since May 2019. Prior to her election to the legislature, she served as a councillor of the Mogale City Local Municipality.

== Political career ==
De Lange is a member of the Freedom Front Plus. She was re-elected as a councillor of the Mogale City Local Municipality in the 2016 municipal election. She was also wrongly elected a councillor of the West Rand District Municipality. On the day of the district municipality's inaugural council meeting, an IEC official communicated to De Lange that there had been a mistake and that the FF Plus had no seats on the council. She proceeded to go to the next meeting on 24 August to voice her concerns, but she was forcefully removed from the sitting.

After the 2019 Gauteng provincial election, De Lange was nominated to the Gauteng Provincial Legislature. She was sworn in as a member on 22 May 2019.

== Personal life ==
In May 2018, De Lange's pregnant daughter was assaulted by the then CEO of Novare Consultants.
