= Khathutshelo Rasilingwane =

South African politician (b. 1990)

Khathutshelo Rasilingwane MPL

Member of the Gauteng Provincial Legislature
- Incumbent
- Assumed office 14 June 2024

Personal details
- Born: 26 February 1990 (age 36)
- Party: Democratic Alliance
- Education: Boston City Campus and Business College (BCom); University of the Witwatersrand (PGBA)
- Profession: Politician

Zelda Khathutshelo Rasilingwane (born 26 February 1990) is a South African politician who has been a Member of the Gauteng Provincial Legislature since 2024, where she represents the Democratic Alliance. Rasilingwane formerly served as a councillor and a member of the mayoral committee (MMC) in the City of Ekurhuleni Metropolitan Municipality.

== Early life and education ==
Rasilingwane was born on 26 February 1990. She grew up in the Venda region of Limpopo before moving to Gauteng in 2004. She holds a Bachelor of Commerce in Marketing Management from Boston City Campus and Business College and a postgraduate diploma in business management from the University of the Witwatersrand.

== Political career ==
Rasilingwane became a member of the Democratic Alliance in 2010. She began her career in the party as a community activist before being elected as the youth chairperson of the DA branch in Ward 92 in City of Ekurhuleni. In 2015, she served as the chairperson of the party's Bronberg constituency and was selected as the DA candidate for Ward 2 in the metro for the 2016 local government elections. She was elected as a proportional representation (PR) councillor in the election and named the DA's shadow member of the mayoral committee for health and social development.

In 2017, Rasilingwane was elected as the DA's deputy provincial chairperson for recruitments and campaigns. She was elected for a second term as a councillor in the 2021 local elections. During that time, she was also chairperson of the DA's Peter Molapo constituency.

In November 2022, Ekurhuleni mayor Tania Campbell appointed Rasilingwane as the member of the mayoral committee (MMC) responsible for community safety. Rasilingwane served in the role until March 2023, when Campbell was removed in a motion of no confidence.

By March 2024, she was serving as the deputy chief whip of the DA caucus in Ekurhuleni when she was named as a candidate for the 2024 national and provincial elections. She was elected to the Gauteng Provincial Legislature in the Gauteng provincial election and consequently vacated her council seat.

In 2025, Rasilingwane was cited by the Mail & Guardian as one of the "Top 200 Young South Africans" for her work in Politics & Governance.

On 20 March 2026, the DA named her their mayoral candidate for the City of Ekurhuleni in the upcoming municipal elections.
