= Raeesah Noor-Mahomed =

South African climate activist

- Born: c. 2002 (age 23–24)
- Education: University of Cape Town
- Alma mater: Parktown Girls' High School
- Known for: Activism

Raeesah Noor-Mahomed is a South African climate action activist based in Cape Town. She is the founder of Stage for Change.

== Biography ==
In early 2020, she was inspired by the actions of Greta Thunberg and the threat posed by Australian wildfires. As a 17-year-old student at Parktown School for Girls, she joined Extinction Rebellion and the Fridays for Future movement, protesting outside Gauteng Legislature.

In November 2021, she crowd-funded to join the protests at Glasgow's Festival Park outside the 2021 United Nations Climate Change Conference. The activists were demanding media attention for activists from the regions and populations that are suffering disproportionate consequences of climate change, i.e. Most Affected People and Areas (MAPA). Thunberg stood beside Noor-Mahomed but directed cameras to the MAPA activists instead of providing interviews herself.

Raeesah Noor-Mahomed argues for an intersectional activism, linking climate change to colonialism, apartheid and climate justice.
