= Alan Fuchs =

South African politician (born 1956)

Alan Fuchs MPL

Member of the Gauteng Provincial Legislature
- Incumbent
- Assumed office 21 May 2014

Personal details
- Born: Alan Joseph Fuchs; 9 June 1956 (age 69)
- Party: Democratic Alliance
- Profession: Consultant, politician

Alan Joseph Fuchs (born 9 June 1956) is a South African politician and a Member of the Gauteng Provincial Legislature for the Democratic Alliance. He is currently the DA's Shadow MEC for Infrastructure Development.

== Background ==
Fuchs worked as a consultant and project manager in the IT industry for many years.

== Political career ==
A member of the Democratic Alliance, Fuchs served as a Johannesburg city councillor for 18 years, 10 years as a ward councillor and 8 years as a proportional representation (PR) councillor. In 2013, Fuchs was appointed chief whip of the DA caucus in the city.

In 2014, Fuchs was elected as a Member of the Gauteng Provincial Legislature. He was then appointed as the DA's spokesperson (Shadow MEC) on Infrastructure Development by John Moodey, the DA's caucus leader. During his first term in the provincial legislature, he served as an alternate member of the Standing Committee on Public Accounts and as a member of the Infrastructure Development Committee. In 2016, he was the DA's campaign manager in the Mogale City Local Municipality for that's year municipal election. The DA briefly held the mayoral position after the election.

In 2019, Fuchs was re-elected to the provincial legislature. Newly elected DA caucus leader Solly Msimanga announced that Fuchs would remain as Infrastructure Development spokesperson. He remained a member of the Infrastructure Development committee. He is also an alternate member of the Education Committee and a member of the Health Committee. Fuchs is the DA's constituency head for Lenasia and surrounding areas.
