= Leanne de Jager =

South African politician

Leanne de Jager MPL

Member of the Gauteng Provincial Legislature
- Incumbent
- Assumed office 14 June 2024

Personal details
- Party: Democratic Alliance
- Education: Rhodes University (BA); University of South Africa (BA)
- Profession: Diplomat, politician

Leanne Jennifer de Jager is a South African politician and diplomat who has been a Member of the Gauteng Provincial Legislature since June 2024, representing the Democratic Alliance. She previously served as the councillor for ward 92 in the City of Tshwane Metropolitan Municipality from 2021 until 2024.

== Early life and education ==
De Jager was born in Durban in 1962. She matriculated from Iona Convent School in Pretoria in 1976. She earned a Bachelor of Arts in Journalism from Rhodes University and a Bachelor of Arts in Communications from the University of South Africa.

== Diplomatic career ==
De Jager worked in the South African foreign service, serving in embassies, missions, and head office posts. She was part of the South African mission to the United Nations in New York City from 1983 to 1986; worked at the Department of Foreign Affairs from 1986 to 1988; and served at the South African Embassy in Mbabane, Swaziland from 1988 to 1992.

She then worked at the South African Interests Office in Rabat, Morocco from 1992 to 1994, followed by a return to the Department of Foreign Affairs head office from 1994 to 1995. In 1995 she served as Relief Administration Officer at the South African Embassy in Kinshasa, Democratic Republic of the Congo.

Her subsequent postings included the South African Embassy in Cairo, Egypt (1996–1997) and the South African Embassy in Amman, Jordan (1997–2000). She returned to the Department of Foreign Affairs head office in 2000, then served at the South African Embassy in Kigali, Rwanda (2000–2001). After training at the Department of Foreign Affairs from 2001 to 2002, she concluded her career at the South African Embassy in Bamako, Mali, where she worked from 2002 until her retirement from the foreign service in 2007.

== Political career ==
De Jager became a member of the Democratic Alliance in 2001. She became a staff member for the party in 2007, working in the Gauteng South regional office before becoming the national events manager, a post she held until 2020, when she was assigned to the Gauteng North office. She was elected a DA proportional representation councillor in the City of Tshwane Metropolitan Municipality in 2016.

De Jager was elected as the ward councillor for ward 92 (Hatfield/Arcadia) in Tshwane during a by-election on 19 May 2021.

De Jager was elected to the Gauteng Provincial Legislature in the 2024 provincial election, vacating her council seat.

In February 2026, De Jager released a press statement, in which she opposed the plan to relocate Johannesburg Art Gallery collection to Museum of Africa, writing: "This relocation is not only premature and fundamentally flawed but also represents a reckless gamble with our cultural heritage and must be strongly opposed." This was due to the Musueum of Africa not being in a state to house the art collection.

On 5 March 2026, she was denied entry to the abandoned State Museum on Boom Street in Pretoria during an oversight visit. She was quoted as saying in an interview with Rekord: "As an MPL, I have the authority to conduct oversight visits, yet I was not allowed to enter the premises to inspect the condition of the museum."
