= Mervyn Cirota =

South African politician (born 1953)

Mervyn Cirota MPL

Member of the Gauteng Provincial Legislature
- Incumbent
- Assumed office 21 May 2014

Personal details
- Born: 24 March 1953 (age 73)
- Party: Democratic Alliance (2000–2005; 2010–present)
- Other political affiliations: Independent Democrats (2006–2010)
- Profession: Politician, attorney

Mervyn Hyman Cirota (born 24 March 1953) is a South African politician who serves as a Member of the Gauteng Provincial Legislature for the Democratic Alliance. He is an attorney by profession.

== Early life and education ==
Cirota matriculated in 1970. He obtained a Bachelor of Commerce qualification in 1976 and achieved a Bachelor of Law (LLB) degree in 1979. He started practicing as an attorney in the 1980s. In 2007, he achieved a diploma in governance from the University of Johannesburg before he achieved a Certificate in Property Development and Management at the University of the Witwatersrand in 2014.

== Political career ==
Cirota became politically involved in the 1970s. He was elected as the ward councillor for Houghton Estate in 2000 as a member of the Democratic Alliance. In 2005, he resigned from the DA and joined the Independent Democrats. The following year, he was appointed as the party's Gauteng Regional Director, a position he held until after the 2006 elections. He also represented the ID in the city's Safety and Finance Committees. He was chairperson of the Bramley Community Police Forum from 1997 to 2008.

In July 2007, he was elected as the national chairperson of the ID. The ID and DA announced their merger in 2010 and Cirota became a member of the DA again. In 2011 he was re-elected to the Johannesburg city council as a DA councillor and he was appointed as the DA's Gauteng Provincial Disciplinary Chair. Cirota became the DA Gauteng South Fundraising Chairperson in 2012. In 2014 he was elected as a member of the Gauteng Provincial Legislature. Cirota was appointed to the role of Shadow MEC for Co-operative Governance and Traditional Affairs by DA Caucus Leader John Moodey in December 2016.

After his re-election in 2019, the newly elected DA Caucus Leader, Solly Msimanga, appointed him as head of the team that deals with legislation. He is also a special delegate to the National Council of Provinces.
