= Dumisani Dakile =

South African politician

Member of the Gauteng Provincial Legislature
- In office 6 June 2019 – 7 December 2020

Personal details
- Born: Soweto, Transvaal; South Africa
- Party: African National Congress
- Other political affiliations: Congress of South African Trade Unions

Andrias Dumisani Dakile is a South African politician and trade unionist who represented the African National Congress (ANC) in the Gauteng Provincial Legislature from June 2019 until his resignation in December 2020. He is also a former Provincial Secretary of the Gauteng branch of the Congress of South African Trade Unions (Cosatu).

== Early life and education ==
Dakile was born in Soweto in present-day Gauteng and matriculated at St Lewis High School, where he became active in the Young Christians' Movement. In later years he joined the Congress of South African Students and ANC Youth League.

He studied at Witswatersrand University, the University of South Africa, and the Gordon Institute of Business Science, and he has a master's degree in economics. In addition to working at Makro, he spent periods working for the South African Commercial, Catering and Allied Workers Union and for the Congress of South African Trade Unions (Cosatu), a close ANC ally.

== Political career ==
By 2019, Dakile was Provincial Secretary of Cosatu's Gauteng branch. In that year's general election, he stood for election to an ANC seat in the Gauteng Provincial Legislature, but he was ranked 41st on the ANC's provincial list and therefore did not initially secure election to one of the ANC's 37 seats. However, on 6 June 2019, he was sworn in to the provincial legislature to fill a casual vacancy in the ANC caucus. Less than two years later, on 7 December 2020, he announced his resignation from the legislature; his seat was filled by Parks Tau.

== Personal life ==
He is married and has a child.
