= Michael Shackleton =

South African politician

Member of the Gauteng Provincial Legislature
- In office 22 May 2019 – 29 April 2022

Member of the National Assembly of South Africa
- In office 11 September 2018 – 7 May 2019

Personal details
- Born: Michael Stephen Shackleton
- Party: Rise Mzansi (2023–present)
- Other political affiliations: Democratic Alliance (2008-2022); ActionSA (2022-2023)
- Education: University of Pretoria
- Profession: Attorney; Politician

Michael Stephen Shackleton is a South African politician who served as a Member of the Gauteng Provincial Legislature from May 2019 to April 2022. Prior to serving in the provincial legislature, he was a Tshwane councillor and a Member of the National Assembly. Formerly a member of the Democratic Alliance, he resigned from the party on 28 April 2022 and joined ActionSA.

== Background ==
Shackleton is from Centurion in Pretoria. His father died from cancer in 2001 just before he started high school and his mother died of heart failure in 2008, while he was at university. He developed a stutter after the death of his parents.

Shackleton has an LLB from the University of Pretoria and is an attorney. He also holds an LLM degree in constitutional and administrative law, a certificate in provincial and local government law, and a postgraduate certificate in corporate law.

== Political career ==
In 2008 Shackleton joined the Democratic Alliance's student organisation at the University of Pretoria. He then became the leader of the party's student organisation at the university and joined the university's student representative council in 2010. He also graduated from the DA's Young Leaders Programme.

He became a councillor in the City of Tshwane Metropolitan Municipality in 2014, representing the DA. In July 2018, Shackleton was cited by News24 as one of "100 Young Mandelas" in the category "Resilience".

Shackleton entered the National Assembly, the lower house of the South African parliament, on 11 September 2018 as a replacement for Ian Ollis. During his time in parliament, he was a member of the Standing Committee on Appropriations.

For the 2019 elections, Shackleton was the 20th candidate on the DA's provincial list for the Gauteng Provincial Legislature election. He was also 81st on the DA's national list and 24th on the party's regional list for the National Assembly election. At the election, he won a seat in the provincial legislature. He served as the DA's Shadow MEC for Community Safety. He was also a member of the Public Accounts committee and the Community Safety portfolio committee.

On 28 April 2022, Shackleton announced in an uploaded video posted on social media that he had resigned as a DA member and therefore as the DA's Gauteng North regional deputy chairperson and as a member of the provincial legislature. He joined ActionSA. Shackleton cited that "the regression of the DA as an inclusive home for all South Africans, and its abandonment of being an electoral alternative to the ANC" and the way the DA treated the community of Ward 96 in Tshwane, of which Shackleton is a resident, as the reasons for his resignation. Shackleton criticised Tshwane mayor Randall Williams and DA leaders Helen Zille and John Steenhuisen for campaigning in ward 96 ahead of the by-election on 4 May 2022 and said that they would "disappear" after the by-election. The DA won the by-election on 4 May.
