= Thulani Kunene =

South African politician

Thulani Kunene MPL

Member of the Gauteng Provincial Legislature
- Incumbent
- Assumed office 14 June 2024

Personal details
- Born: 15 April 1973 (age 53)
- Party: African National Congress

Monty Thulani Kunene (born 15 April 1973) is a South African politician from Gauteng. He has represented the African National Congress (ANC) in the Gauteng Provincial Legislature since June 2024.

== Life and career ==
Kunene was born on 15 April 1973. He has a degree in communications from the University of South Africa.

Kunene first joined government in the December 2000 local elections, in which he was elected as a councillor in Emfuleni Local Municipality in Gauteng. He served in the council for nine years, with stints as a member of the mayoral committee and chief whip in the council.

In the May 2024 general election, he was elected to an ANC seat in the Gauteng Provincial Legislature, ranked 15th on the ANC's provincial party list. He was also elected as deputy chairperson of committees.
