= Abel Tau =

South African politician

Gauteng Spokesperson of the uMkhonto weSizwe Party
- Incumbent
- Assumed office 2024

Member of the Mayoral Committee for Human Settlements of the City of Tshwane
- In office 14 December 2021 – 10 November 2022
- Mayor: Randall Williams

Member of the Tshwane City Council
- In office 2 November 2021 – 10 November 2022

Personal details
- Born: Soshanguve, Gauteng, South Africa
- Party: uMkhonto weSizwe Party (October 2024-present)
- Other political affiliations: The Transformation Alliance (June 2023 - October 2024) United Africans Transformation (January - June 2023); ActionSA (2020–2022) Democratic Alliance (until 2020)
- Occupation: Politician

Abel Tau is a South African politician. He was the MMC for Human Settlements in the City of Tshwane Metropolitan Municipality. He was a senior member of ActionSA. He was expelled from the party amid a sexual misconduct scandal, and has subsequently held positions in several other political parties.

== Qualifications ==
Tau holds a diploma in operations management.

== Political career ==
=== Democratic Alliance (until 2020) ===
Abel Tau served as a Democratic Alliance (DA) councillor in the City of Tshwane and the DA's regional chairperson until 2020 when he resigned to join Herman Mashaba's movement - The People's Dialogue. Whilst Tau was still a member of the DA, he served as the MMC for Utility Services and an acting executive mayor in 2019.

=== ActionSA ===
Abel Tau was ActionSA's mayoral candidate for the City of Tshwane during the 2021 Local Government elections. He was sworn in as a councillor for ActionSA in the City of Tshwane on 23 November 2021 during the City's inaugural council meeting. He was appointed as the MMC of Housing and Human settlements by Randall Williams on 14 December 2021. Tau served as ActionSA's caucus leader in the Tshwane council until 10 March 2021.

In November 2022, he was expelled from ActionSA after rape allegations were levelled against him.

=== United Africans Transformation ===
Tau launched a new political party, United Africans Transformation (UAT), on 17 January 2023 as he filed court papers at the North Gauteng High Court to challenge the termination of his ActionSA membership.

=== The Transformation Alliance ===
In June 2023, Tau announced he was leaving the UAT, and forming a new organisation, The Transformation Alliance (TTA).

=== Umkhonto weSizwe Party ===
In October 2024, Tau was announced as having joined the uMkhonto weSizwe Party. He subsequently became the party's Gauteng spokesperson.

== Personal life ==
Tau is married to Nkele Molapo, whose ActionSA membership was terminated in March 2023 after an internal party investigation found that she had shared confidential information about the party with Tau, in violation of the party rules.
