= Dolly Ledwaba =

South African politician

Dolly Ledwaba MPL

Member of the Gauteng Provincial Legislature
- Incumbent
- Assumed office 22 May 2019

Personal details
- Citizenship: South Africa
- Party: African National Congress

Dolly Caroline Ledwaba is a South African politician who has represented the African National Congress (ANC) in the Gauteng Provincial Legislature since 2019. She formerly represented the ANC as a local councillor in the City of Tshwane Metropolitan Municipality.

== Political career ==
Ledwaba served three terms in the Tshwane council – one term as a proportional-representation councillor and two terms as a ward councillor for Ward 33 in Soshanguve. In July 2018, she was elected to a four-year term on the Provincial Executive Committee of the ANC's provincial branch in Gauteng.

The following year, in the 2019 general election, she was elected for the first time to a seat in the Gauteng Provincial Legislature, ranked 28th on the ANC's provincial party list. She was not re-elected to the Provincial Executive Committee in 2022.

== Personal life ==
Ledwaba's daughter, Lerato Aphane, is a local politician in Tshwane.
