= William Matsheke =

South African politician

William Matsheke MPL

Member of the Gauteng Provincial Legislature
- Incumbent
- Assumed office 22 May 2019

Personal details
- Born: 1981 (age 44–45) Magaliesburg, Transvaal; South Africa
- Party: African National Congress

William Mathafeng Matsheke (born in 1981) is a South African politician who has represented the African National Congress (ANC) in the Gauteng Provincial Legislature since 2019. He was formerly a public servant and an ANC Youth League activist.

== Early life and career ==
Matsheke was born in Magaliesburg in 1981 and joined the Congress of South African Students during his youth. He later served as chairperson of the ANC Youth League's local branch in Magaliesburg and as chairperson of the league's regional branch in the West Rand.

From 2010 to 2016, he worked in Gauteng's provincial government, first in the administration of the Gauteng Provincial Legislature and later as chief of staff to Molebatsi Bopape, who was then the Member of the Executive Council (MEC) for Social Development. From 2017 to 2019, he worked at Rand West City Local Municipality as manager and political advisor in the speaker's office.

== Legislative career ==
In the 2019 general election, Matsheke was elected to the Gauteng Provincial Legislature, ranked 26th on the ANC's provincial party list.

== Personal life ==
He is married to Makgotso Matsheke and has two daughters.
