= Paul Malema =

South African politician

Paul Malema MPL

Member of the Gauteng Provincial Legislature
- Incumbent
- Assumed office 22 May 2019

Personal details
- Citizenship: South Africa
- Party: African National Congress

Duitso Paul Malema is a South African politician who has represented the African National Congress (ANC) in the Gauteng Provincial Legislature since 2019. He was elected to his seat in the 2019 general election, ranked 27th on the ANC's provincial party list.
