= Crezane Bosch =

South African politician

Crezane Bosch MPL

Member of the Gauteng Provincial Legislature
- Incumbent
- Assumed office 22 May 2019

Personal details
- Born: 7 May 1982 (age 44)
- Party: Democratic Alliance
- Children: 1
- Education: University of Pretoria
- Occupation: Member of the Provincial Legislature
- Profession: Politician

Crezane Bosch (born 7 May 1982) is a South African politician who is a Democratic Alliance Member of the Gauteng Provincial Legislature for the Seventh Legislature. Prior to her election to the provincial legislature, she was a Tshwane councillor. In 2023 became the regional chairperson of the Democratic Alliance in Gauteng North, Tshwane.

== Education ==
Bosch has a diploma in call centre and marketing management from Damelin and a certificate in public relations management from the Public Relations Institute of Southern Africa. She also holds a paralegal studies certificate in wills, estate and conveyancing and has qualifications in community profiling, business presentation and public speaking which she obtained from the University of Pretoria. Bosch also earned a certificate in employee assistance and wellness Programmes from UP. She is currently studying towards an LLB with the University of South Africa.

== Political career ==
Bosch's career in politics began in 2006 when she became a Democratic Alliance activist and the chairperson of the DA's ward 5 branch in Tshwane (Pretoria). She was then employed as a full-time staff member of the DA and as the Constituency Operations Manager in 2007. In 2009, Bosch was named as the Regional Operations Manager of the DA's Gauteng East Region.

Bosch was elected as a Tshwane councillor in the 2011 municipal elections. She was re-elected in 2016. In 2017, she was appointed deputy chief whip of the DA caucus in Tshwane.

In October 2017, Bosch was elected the DA's regional chairperson of elections and by-elections in Tshwane.

Bosch was nominated to the Gauteng Provincial Legislature following the 2019 Gauteng provincial election, as she was 12th on the party's list and the party won 20 seats. Bosch was sworn in as a member of the provincial legislature on 22 May 2019. She received her committee assignments on 13 June. She serves on both the Social Development Portfolio Committee and the Sports, Arts, Culture and Recreation Committee.

== Personal life ==
Bosch has a daughter.
