= Sérgio Dos Santos =

South African politician (born 1981)

Sérgio Dos Santos MPL

Member of the Gauteng Provincial Legislature
- Incumbent
- Assumed office 22 May 2019

Personal details
- Born: Sérgio José Pombo Dos Santos; 21 April 1981 (age 45) Johannesburg, South Africa
- Party: Democratic Alliance
- Profession: Politician

Sérgio José Pombo Dos Santos (born 21 April 1981) is a South African politician who has served as a Member of the Gauteng Provincial Legislature since 2019, representing the Democratic Alliance.

== Early life ==
Dos Santos was born on 21 April 1981 in Johannesburg. He worked in human resources before he was elected to the city council of the City of Johannesburg Metropolitan Municipality.

== Political career ==
He started his political career by working as the constituency operations manager of the Democratic Alliance from 2009 to 2011.

Dos Santos was elected to the City of Johannesburg council for ward 54 in the 2011 municipal elections. He was later appointed by-elections manager for his constituency. Dos Santos was one of the DA's campaign managers for the 2016 municipal elections, in which the African National Congress lost their majority of seats on the city council. He was also re-elected as the ward councillor for ward 54 at the election. After that, the DA managed to form a coalition with small parties and won control of the municipality. Dos Santos was appointed chairperson of the Section 79 Oversight Committee on Governance.

For the 2019 national and provincial elections, Dos Santos stood as a candidate for the Gauteng Provincial Legislature on the DA's list. As a result of the DA winning 20 seats in the provincial legislature, he was allocated a seat in the legislature and was sworn in on 22 May 2019.

Dos Santos currently serves as a member of the Petitions Committee.

== Personal life ==
Dos Santos is married and has one child. He is a Muslim.

== See also ==
- Portuguese South Africans
- List of members of the 6th Gauteng Provincial Legislature
