= Andiswa Mosai =

South African politician

Andiswa Mosai MPL

Member of the Gauteng Provincial Legislature
- Incumbent
- Assumed office 14 June 2024

Personal details
- Born: 17 September 1974 (age 52)
- Party: African National Congress
- Education: Rhodes University; University of KwaZulu-Natal (PhD)
- Profession: Politician

Andiswa Charlene Mosai (born 17 September 1974) is a South African politician from Gauteng. She has represented the African National Congress (ANC) in the Gauteng Provincial Legislature since June 2024.

== Early life and education ==
Mosai was born on 17 September 1974. She grew up in Bloemfontein, where she attended St. Bernard's High School.

She holds a Bachelor of Science degree from Rhodes University, and in 2026, while serving in government, she graduated from the University of KwaZulu-Natal with a PhD in management; her dissertation studied corporate governance in South African local government, using Gauteng's Sedibeng District Municipality as a case study.

Before entering frontline politics, she held various positions in public agencies and entities: she worked in human resources at PetroSA, Transnet Port Terminals, and Transnet Freight Rail, was a cultural officer at the Department of Arts and Culture, and was a government social worker stationed in the Free State. She also served on the board of the Export Credit Insurance Corporation.

== Political career ==
Mosai began her political career in local structures of the African National Congress (ANC) in the Midvaal, including as a recruiter for the ANC Women's League and later as deputy secretary of the ANC's regional branch in Sedibeng. She went on to represent the party as a proportional-representation councillor in the Sedibeng District Municipality, where she served as speaker of the council.

At the Gauteng ANC's provincial elective conference in Benoni in June 2022, Mosai was elected to the party's Provincial Executive Committee; by number of votes received, she was ranked 28th of the committee's 30 ordinary members. After the leadership corps was disbanded by the party's National Executive Committee in 2025, Mosai was appointed to the interim task team that led the provincial party until its next elective conference.

Meanwhile, in the May 2024 general election, she was elected to represent the ANC in the Gauteng Provincial Legislature, ranked 26th on the provincial party list. She was also elected as chairperson of the legislature's finance committee.

== Personal life ==
Her husband is reportedly the Rand Water chief executive, Sipho Mosai.
