= Mamsie Mofama =

South African politician

Member of the Gauteng Provincial Legislature
- In office 22 May 2019 – 31 January 2023

Personal details
- Died: South African
- Party: Economic Freedom Fighters

Mamsie Rose Mofama is a South African politician who represented the Economic Freedom Fighters in the Gauteng Provincial Legislature between 2019 and 2023. She was elected to the provincial legislature in the 2019 general election, and ranked 5th on the EFF provincial list. She was a member of the Petitions Committee and the Committee on the Scrutiny of Subordinate Legislation (CSSL) as well as an alternate member of the Social Development Committee.

On 1 February 2023, News24 reported that Mofama and other EFF MPLs had resigned from the provincial legislature the previous day; this came after EFF president Julius Malema announced on 29 January 2023 that the party's Central Command Team, the party's highest decision-making structure, had discussed the need to change the redeployment of EFF public representatives to Parliament and provincial legislatures following the party's provincial conferences which were held in 2022.
