= Beverley Badenhorst =

South African politician

Beverley Badenhorst MPL

Member of the Gauteng Provincial Legislature
- Incumbent
- Assumed office 22 May 2019

Personal details
- Party: Economic Freedom Fighters
- Occupation: Member of the Provincial Legislature
- Profession: Politician

Beverley Felicity Badenhorst is South African politician serving as a Member of the Gauteng Provincial Legislature since May 2019. Badenhorst is a member of the Economic Freedom Fighters.

== Political career ==
Badenhorst is a member of the Economic Freedom Fighters. After the 2019 provincial election, she was nominated for the Gauteng Provincial Legislature. She took office on 22 May 2019.

Badenhorst was given her committee assignments on 13 June 2019. She serves as an alternate member of the Standing Committee on Public Accounts and as a member of the Social Development Portfolio Committee.
