= Petrus Mabunda =

South African politician

Petrus Mabunda MPL

Member of the Gauteng Provincial Legislature
- In office 22 May 2019 – 1 February 2023

Personal details
- Citizenship: South Africa
- Party: African National Congress

Petrus Butana Mabunda is a South African politician who represented the African National Congress (ANC) in the Gauteng Provincial Legislature from 2019 until his resignation in February 2023. He was elected to the seat in the 2019 general election, ranked 21st on the ANC's provincial party list. He resigned at the beginning of February 2023 and his seat was filled by Tshilidzi Munyai.

Before his election to the legislature, Mabunda represented the ANC as a local councilor in the City of Ekurhuleni Metropolitan Municipality, where he was a Member of the Mayoral Committee under Mayor Mzwandile Masina.
