= Lindiwe Lasindwa =

South African politician

Member of the Gauteng Provincial Legislature
- In office 2006 – 1 August 2021

Personal details
- Died: 1 August 2021
- Citizenship: South Africa
- Party: African National Congress

Lindiwe Lasindwa (died 1 August 2021) was a South African politician who represented the African National Congress (ANC) in the Gauteng Provincial Legislature from 2006 until her death in 2021. A former local councillor in KwaThema, Gauteng, she was also a member of the Provincial Executive Committee of the ANC's Gauteng branch.

== Political career ==
Lasindwa was a ward councillor in KwaThema from 2004 until 2006, when she joined the Gauteng Provincial Legislature. She was re-elected to her first full term in the legislature in the 2009 general election, ranked 33rd on the ANC's provincial party list, and she was elected to her second and third terms, respectively, in 2014 (ranked 28th) and 2019 (ranked 25th).

During her tenure in office, she served stints as Chairperson of the Standing Committee on Petitions and of the Portfolio Committee on Infrastructure Development and Gender, Youth, and People with Disabilities. At the time of her death, she chaired the legislature's Portfolio Committee on Economic Development, Environment, Agriculture and Rural Development. She also served as a member of the Provincial Executive Committee of the Gauteng ANC, having been elected to a four-year term on the committee at a party elective conference in July 2018.

== Death ==
She died on 1 August 2021 after a short illness.
