= Thulani Ndlovu =

South African politician

Thulani Ndlovu MPL

Member of the Gauteng Provincial Legislature
- Incumbent
- Assumed office 26 November 2019

Personal details
- Citizenship: South Africa
- Party: African National Congress

Thulani Ndlovu is a South African politician who has represented the African National Congress (ANC) in the Gauteng Provincial Legislature since November 2019. An ANC Youth League activist, he has also been a member of the ANC's Provincial Executive Committee in Gauteng since 2022.

== Early life and career ==
Born on 8 November 1979 in Soweto. A last son to Norah Philisiwe Zondi, a domestic worker and Mgideni Ndlovu a security guard.

Ndlovu joined Congress Of South African Students in the early 90s and at a very young age.He was part of the Self Defence Unit and played a role in protecting the Alexandra Township and its people. He is part of those who campaigned for the ANC during the first ever Democratic elections in 1994 but could not vote due to age restrictions, he was only turning 15 in November that year. He became the Chairperson of COSAS Alexandra Branch in 1995 and Provincial Executive committee member in 1996 and later in 1997 was elected Provincial Secretary in Gauteng province. He was the youngest and former President of the Student Representative Council in Realogile High in Alexandra where he served from 1996 to 1998. In 1997 Tiblon Ndlovu and other young activists of Alexandra founded the Alexandra Student Forum(an umbrella organisation inclusive of all political student formations)and he became the first deputy chairperson in 1997. Ndlovu played a pivotal role when the ANC and its structures moved to operate in ward based level becoming the first treasure of the ANCYL branch in 2003 and elected into the first Ward based branch of ANC in ward 76 Johannesburg at which his grouping also won the naming of the branch to Isandlwana branch which is still the current branch name He then became the chair in 2005 and in 2008 was elected as Chairperson of the Alexandra Zone In 2014 he was amongst those who were appointed to serve in Provincial Task Team of the Youth League and he later in 2016 was elected to the Provincial Executive Committee of the ANC Youth League. Ndlovu is known in ANC structures and viewed by some members as a grounded force, accessible and a humble leader, he is a former branch chair, zonal secretary, and zonal chairperson the position he held until elected to the ANC Provincial Executive Committee in June 2022 in Gauteng.

== Political career ==
Ndlovu was a member of the Provincial Executive Committee of the ANC Youth League's branch in Gauteng. In the 2019 general election, he was ranked 39th on the ANC's provincial party and could not make it since ANC won 37 seats. Immediately after the elections Parks Tau who was number 8 on the list of Gauteng legislature, was appointed as deputy minister in the Cyril Ramaphosa administration, making Thulani Ndlovu number 38 on the list. The ANC however informed Ndlovu that the alliance was not fully represented and he had to make way for Dumisani Dakile who was number 41 on the list. The ANCYL and those close to Tiblon Ndlovu viewed this as undermining the list and tempering with processes. However, he was sworn into the legislature on 26 November 2019 to fill a casual vacancy arising from the death of Thuliswa Nkabinde-Khawe.

In early December 2020, the ANC reportedly asked Ndlovu to consider resigning from the legislature so that his seat could be taken up by Parks Tau, who was expected to be appointed to the Gauteng Executive Council. The ANC Youth League scorned the request in a statement and, according to News24, backed Ndlovu when he refused to resign. Ndlovu remained in his legislative seat and in July 2022 he was elected to a four-year term on the Provincial Executive Committee of the mainstream ANC's Gauteng branch.
