= Nomvuyo Mhlakaza-Manamela =

South African politician

Nomvuyo Mhlakaza-Manamela MPL

Deputy Speaker of the Gauteng Provincial Legislature
- Incumbent
- Assumed office 12 July 2024
- Speaker: Morakane Mosupyoe
- Preceded by: Refiloe Nt'sekhe
- In office May 2019 – May 2024
- Speaker: Ntombi Mekgwe
- Preceded by: Nomantu Nkomo-Ralehoko
- Succeeded by: Refiloe Nt'sekhe

Personal details
- Citizenship: South Africa
- Party: African National Congress
- Other party: South African Communist Party
- Spouse: Buti Manamela

Nomvuyo Memory Mhlakaza-Manamela is a South African politician who served as Deputy Speaker of the Gauteng Provincial Legislature from May 2019 until May 2024 and again from July 2024. A human resources practitioner by training, she is a member of the African National Congress (ANC).

== Early career and education ==
Mhlakaza-Manamela has a BTech degree in human resources management from the Tshwane University of Technology. She began her corporate career in the human resources department of the National Co-operative Association of South Africa and then of the Industrial Development Corporation and computer firm CSS Tirisano. She then worked at ACTOM John Thompson from 2007 to 2010 and at the National Youth Development Agency from 2010 to 2013.

In 2017, she was appointed senior manager for recruitment at the Ekurhuleni Metropolitan Municipality. She also served on as non-executive director on the boards of several public entities, including PetroSA, the State Information and Technology Agency, and, from 2013 until her resignation in 2016, the South African Broadcasting Corporation.

Over the same period, Mhlakaza-Manamela was active in her political party, the ANC. She was formerly a member of the National Executive Committee of the South African Students Congress and ANC Youth League, and she was elected to the Provincial Executive Committee of the ANC in Gauteng in 2018 and 2022. She is also a member of the South African Communist Party (SACP), a close ANC ally, and served on the Gauteng provincial executive of both the SACP and its Young Communist League.

== Legislative career ==
In the 2019 general election, she was elected to a seat in the Gauteng Provincial Legislature, ranked 22nd on the ANC's provincial party list. The ANC, the majority party in the legislature, nominated her for the office of Deputy Speaker of the provincial legislature, serving under Speaker Ntombi Mekgwe.

In June 2022, the National Prosecuting Authority announced that it would seek to prosecute Mhlakaza-Manamela on charges of assault with the intent to cause grievous bodily harm and crimen injuria. She was accused of assaulting Sergeant Lizzy Mojapelo, a protection officer with the South African Police Service, in February 2020. Mojapelo alleged that she had been at Mhlakaza-Manamela's home when Mhlakaza-Manamela attacked her while drunk; Mojapelo was pregnant at the time. Mhlakaza-Manamela first appeared in the Johannesburg Magistrate's Court in August 2022.

Following the 2024 provincial election, Mhlakaza-Manamela was succeeded by the DA's Refiloe Nt'sekhe as Deputy Speaker. Mhlakaza-Manamela was re-elected as Deputy Speaker after Nt'sekhe's resignation following the DA's withdrawal from provincial government talks.
