= Nico de Jager =

South African politician

Nico de Jager MPL

Member of the Gauteng Provincial Legislature
- Incumbent
- Assumed office 18 February 2021

Member of the Mayoral Committee for Environmental and Infrastructure Services in the City of Johannesburg
- In office 14 February 2017 – 27 November 2019
- Preceded by: Anthony Still
- Succeeded by: Mpho Moerane

Councillor – City of Johannesburg
- In office 2005–2021

Personal details
- Born: Nicolaas Mattheus de Jager
- Party: Democratic Alliance
- Education: Langenhoven High School

Nicolaas Mattheus de Jager, known as Nico de Jager, is a South African politician and a Member of the Gauteng Provincial Legislature for the Democratic Alliance (DA). He previously served as the Member of the Mayoral Committee for Environmental and Infrastructure Services in the City of Johannesburg under Mayor Herman Mashaba from 2017 to 2019 and as a city councillor from 2005 to 2021.

== Education ==
De Jager attended Langenhoven High School in Riversdale, Western Cape. He holds formal qualifications in public administration and economics.

== Political career ==
After the 2000 municipal elections, De Jager went on to become the branch chairperson of the Democratic Alliance's Thabeni branch in Johannesburg. He became a DA PR councillor in 2005. De Jager was the DA's Shadow Mayoral Committee Member for Transport in the city. In September 2016, he was elected chairperson of the city's Section 79 Transport committee.

In February 2017, De Jager was appointed as the Member of the Mayoral Committee for Environmental and Infrastructure Services, replacing Anthony Still. He served until November 2019, when mayor Herman Mashaba resigned.

De Jager was sworn in as a Member of the Gauteng Provincial Legislature on 18 February 2021.

In April 2021, De Jager denounced Castro Ntobeko, an African National Congress member and employee of the Gauteng Department of Cooperative Governance and Traditional Affairs, for celebrating the death of four gay men and called for his immediate suspension.

He said in May 2021 that the DA opposed the renaming of William Nicol Drive to Winnie Madikizela-Mandela Drive because of the timing due to the impacts of COVID-19 on businesses in the area and not because of the name itself.

De Jager criticised the ANC in June 2021 for refusing to fly the Rainbow flag at the Johannesburg City council, during Pride Month.

== Personal life ==
De Jager is gay. He was one of a number of gay DA councillors in Johannesburg when he was still a councillor.
