= Dulton Adams =

South African politician

Dulton Adams MPL

Member of the Gauteng Provincial Legislature
- Incumbent
- Assumed office 22 May 2019

Personal details
- Born: Dulton Keith Adams
- Party: African Christian Democratic Party
- Occupation: Member of the Provincial Legislature
- Profession: Politician

Dulton Keith Adams is a South African politician. He has been serving as a Member of the Gauteng Provincial Legislature since 22 May 2019. He is a member of the African Christian Democratic Party (ACDP) and the party's sole representative in the provincial legislature.
