= Lebogang More =

South African politician (1980–2021)

Member of the Gauteng Provincial Legislature
- In office August 2013 – 26 June 2021
- Preceded by: Gavin Lewis

Personal details
- Born: Lebogang Ludwig More; 23 April 1980
- Died: 26 June 2021 (aged 41)
- Party: Democratic Alliance (2003–2021)
- Education: University of the Witwatersrand
- Occupation: Politician

Lebogang Ludwig More (23 April 1980 – 26 June 2021) was a South African politician who served as a Member of the Gauteng Provincial Legislature from August 2013 to June 2021, representing the Democratic Alliance. He was the DA Gauteng Shadow MEC for Sports Arts, Culture and Recreation. Previously, he served as a PR councillor in the Mogale City Local Municipality.

== Early life and education ==
More was an alumnus of Germany's International Leadership Academy as well as Theodor Heuss International Academy. More completed a post-graduate NQF 8 qualification in Advanced Governance and Leadership at the University of the Witwatersrand.

== Political career ==
More joined the Democratic Alliance in 2003. He was elected branch chairperson of the DA Youth at the Mogale City branch in 2004. More was a member of the DA Gauteng Commission on Youth between 2005 and 2010, as well as a DA councillor in the Mogale City Local Municipality. He served as deputy chief whip of the DA caucus in Mogale City.

In 2011, he was elected President of the Organisation of African Liberal Youth. More was appointed to the Gauteng Provincial Legislature in August 2013. He replaced Gavin Lewis. He was made the DA's spokesperson on petitions. More was elected to full term in 2014.

Following his re-election in 2019, More was made Shadow MEC for Sports, Art, Recreation and Culture.

== Death ==
More died on 26 June 2021. While his cause of death has not been disclosed, it is understood that he had been in hospital.
