= Greg Schneemann =

South African politician

Greg Schneemann MPL

Member of the Gauteng Provincial Legislature
- Incumbent
- Assumed office 21 August 2020

Member of the National Assembly
- In office until 6 May 2014

Personal details
- Citizenship: South Africa
- Party: African National Congress (since 1995)

Gregory David Schneemann is a South African politician who has represented the African National Congress (ANC) in the Gauteng Provincial Legislature since August 2020. He formerly served in the national Parliament from 1994 to 2014. In 2022, he was elected to a five-year term as a member of the Provincial Executive Committee of the ANC's Gauteng branch.

== Political career ==
Schneemann joined the ANC in 1995 and is the son of Maureen Schneemann, a local ANC politician in Zandspruit, Gauteng. He served as a Member of Parliament from 1999 to 2014. Although he stood for re-election to the National Assembly in the 2014 general election, he was ranked 31st on the ANC's regional party list for Gauteng and therefore did not secure a seat.

In the next general election in 2019, he stood for election to a seat in the Gauteng Provincial Legislature, but he was ranked 40th on the ANC's list and again did not initially secure a seat. However, after a casual vacancy arose in the ANC caucus, he was sworn in as a Member of the Provincial Legislature on 21 August 2020. In July 2022, he was elected to a five-year term on the Provincial Executive Committee of the Gauteng ANC.
