= Adriana Randall =

South African politician

Adriana Randall MPL

Member of the Gauteng Provincial Legislature
- Incumbent
- Assumed office 21 May 2014

Personal details
- Party: Democratic Alliance
- Occupation: Member of the Provincial Legislature
- Profession: Politician

Adriana Maria Randall is a South African politician. She is currently a member of the Gauteng Provincial Legislature for the opposition Democratic Alliance. She is the DA's Shadow MEC for Finance. Randall had previously served as the DA's Procurement spokesperson and Shadow MEC for Provincial Treasury and e-Government.

== Career ==
Randall was a Bank Manager at Absa for many years. She holds post-graduate degrees in Business Psychology.

In 2005, Randall became a member of the Democratic Alliance and in March 2006, she was elected as the ward councillor for ward 52 in the Tshwane Metropolitan Municipality. Randall was appointed the Shadow Mayoral Committee Member for Finance in the metro in 2012. She headed the Against Crime Team, where she exposed tender irregularities in Tshwane.

In the build-up to the 2014 election, Randall was placed twenty-third on the Democratic Alliance's list of candidates for the provincial legislature. She was elected to the Gauteng Provincial Legislature as the DA won 23 seats. In 2019, she was placed sixteenth on the party's provincial list and was re-elected.

== Personal life ==
Randall has one daughter, Chante.
