= Anna Lemmer Badenhorst Rudolph =

South African author and composer

Anna Rudolph
- Born: Anna Lemmer Badenhorst Swart; 9 March 1924; Potchefstroom, South Africa
- Died: 2 September 1995 (aged 71); South Africa
- Education: Pretoria Teachers' Training College
- Occupations: Author, composer, singer
- Years active: 1960s–1995
- Spouse: Coenraad Frederik Rudolph
- Children: 4 (including Dr. Lize Rudolph-Stroebel)

Anna Lemmer Badenhorst Swart Rudolph (9 April 1924 – 2 September 1995) was a South African author, composer, and singer who wrote books, theatrical works, and songs for children. She is especially known for her contributions to Afrikaans children's music, which was widely sung by Afrikaans-speaking children throughout South Africa during the 1970s. She published under the name Anna Rudolph.

== Early life and education ==
Rudolph was born on 9 April 1924 in Potchefstroom, South Africa, into a musical and artistic family. She took piano lessons during her school years and developed an early interest in music. From 1942 to 1944, she studied at the Pretoria Teachers' Training College, where she trained to be a teacher. In 1945, she married Coenraad Frederik Rudolph, a playwright and lecturer at the same institution, with whom she had three daughters and one son.

== Music career ==
Rudolph began her professional singing career in Pretoria, performing with a singing group Cantare. However, it was her children's music that would become her most enduring legacy. During the 1960s and 1970s, her songs became integral to the Afrikaans singing culture among children in South Africa. At a time when Afrikaans-speaking families often entertained themselves without advanced sound technology, Rudolph's children's songs were sung in schools and homes across the country.

Her compositions for children like Oom Jan sny koring, Skoppelmaai en Oupa se Ford were characterized by their simplicity and accessibility, always sung by children for children, which set her apart from contemporaries who employed adult voices for children's songs.

== Works and contributions ==
Rudolph wrote prolifically across various forms, including plays, children's stories, and musical theatre. She collaborated with composers like Pierre Malan and Rykie Pienaar, writing librettos for operettas such as Skrikkeljanie and Met liefde aan Marlies. She also worked closely with her husband, Coenie Rudolph, on numerous theatrical projects.

Rudolph's children's music was released on several LPs, with her first album, Nuwe Afrikaanse kinderliedjies uit ons land, released in 1963. Over the next two decades, she produced a dozen more albums, including Dankie Soldaat, which was dedicated to the South African National Defense Force in 1989. Her songs were published by prominent South African music and publishing houses such as DALRO, Melody Music Publishers, N.G. Kerkboekhandel, Perskor, and Voortrekkerpers.

== Final years and death ==
Rudolph continued to compose children's music and collaborate with her daughter, Dr. Lize Rudolph-Stroebel, until her death in 1995. Together, they created the songs for Word Power, an English second language educational TV series broadcast by the South African Broadcasting Corporation (SABC) in 1994 and 1995.

Rudolph died on 2 September 1995 at the age of 71, leaving behind a rich legacy of children's music that remains a cornerstone of Afrikaans music education. In 2011, a field experiment led to the release of a CD featuring some of Rudolph's children's songs from the 1970s, confirming the lasting relevance of her music. Five of her children's songs were selected for inclusion in the FAK-Sangbundel Volume II in 2012.

Rudolph's compositions are also notable for their role in bilingual education, as she composed and adapted songs into African languages. Her Bana Opelang! series of 10 volumes, containing Tswana, Sotho, Venda, and Tsonga translations of her songs, was aimed at promoting cultural inclusivity through music. Additionally, she compiled a Zulu songbook titled Hlabelelani Bantwana!, although it was never published.

Her lasting legacy includes the role her children's songs played in shaping the musical development of young Afrikaans speakers, helping them form a connection to their cultural roots. Many of her compositions have been recognized as important contributions to the preservation of Afrikaans heritage.

== Books ==
- Bruidjies Tussen Boeke: ‘n Luimige Toneel in Vier Dele
- Die Dooie Sel: ‘n Humoristiese Eenbedryf

== Songbooks ==
- Sing maats (1968) 12 songs
- Nuwe Liedjies Vir Almal (1969) 44 songs (collection)
- Nog Liedjies (1971) 32 songs
- Bana Binang! Bana Opelang! Vana Yimbelelan! Vana Imbana! (1973) 40 songs
- Kom ons Sing (1974) 41 songs
- Volksangbundel van Anna Rudolph (1985) (collection)

== Solo songs ==
- Aandstilte, Drafliedjie, Drakenberg staplied, Johannesburg Stad van Goud and more
- Pretoria Wes Hospitaallied, Roosmaryn Koshuislied and 10 more School Songs
- Vier Limericks

== Musical theatre ==
- Die Silwer Sambreeltjie/The Silver Umbrella (with J. Pierre Malan and Coenie Rudolph; English translation by Mervyn Woodrow)
- Jolige Jonkheid (with Coenie Rudolph)
- Tollie Tollieman
- Met Liefde van Marlies/With Love from Marlies (with Xander Haagen and Gerrit Olivier)
- Prys vir ‘n Meisie (with J. Pierre Malan)
- Skrikkeljanie
- Van der Merwe K.O.O.S.

== Plays ==
- Bye Om ‘n Aster
- Die Dooie Sel
- Die Noodsein
- ‘n Bruidjie Tussen Boeke
- ‘n Nooi vir Koelspruit
- Ouma se Dinge
