= Busisiwe Mncube =

South African politician

Busisiwe Mncube MPL

Member of the Gauteng Provincial Legislature
- In office 21 May 2014 – 7 May 2019

Delegate to the National Council of Provinces

Assembly Member for Gauteng
- In office 7 May 2009 – 21 April 2014

Personal details
- Citizenship: South Africa
- Party: African National Congress

Busisiwe Veronica "Pinky" Mncube is a South African politician who currently represents the African National Congress (ANC) in the Gauteng Provincial Legislature. She was formerly a Delegate to the National Council of Provinces (NCOP) from 2009 to 2014.

== Legislative career ==
In the 2009 general election, Mncube was elected to represent the ANC as a Delegate to the NCOP. She served as the whip of the Gauteng caucus in the NCOP. After a full term in the NCOP, she was elected to a seat in the Gauteng Provincial Legislature in the 2014 general election, ranked 41st on the ANC's provincial party list.

In the next general election in 2019, she was ranked 38th on the ANC's provincial party list and therefore did not initially secure re-election to one of the party's 37 seats in the provincial legislature. However, she later joined the legislature to fill a casual vacancy. As of 2022, she was a member of the legislature's Portfolio Committee on Economic Development, Environment, Agriculture, and Rural Development and headed the ANC's parliamentary constituency office in Alexandra, Gauteng.
