= Thokozile Magagula =

South African politician

Thokozile Magagula MPL

Member of the Gauteng Provincial Legislature
- Incumbent
- Assumed office 2011

Personal details
- Born: 1955 or 1956 (age 69–70) Delmas, Transvaal; Union of South Africa
- Citizenship: South Africa
- Party: African National Congress

Thokozile Magagula (born in 1955 or 1956) is a South African politician who has represented the African National Congress (ANC) in the Gauteng Provincial Legislature since 2011. She entered politics through the trade union movement and from 2003 to 2012 she served as Provincial Secretary of the Gauteng branch of the ANC Women's League.

== Early life and career ==
Magagula was born in 1955 or 1956 in Delmas in present-day Mpumalanga, then part of the Transvaal. Her family later moved to Springs and then, when she was nine-years-old, to KwaThema, where she spent the rest of her childhood. She became involved in politics through the Food and Allied Workers' Union (FAWU), where she was a shop steward while working for food companies in the Transvaal. She was later elected as chairperson of FAWU's KwaThema branch and then as second deputy president of the greater regional branch.

She also became active in the ANC after it was unbanned by the apartheid government in 1990. In 1990, she was elected as the inaugural chairperson of the KwaThema local branch of the ANC Women's League; by 1996, she had risen through the ranks to become Regional Chairperson of the league's Greater East Rand branch, as well as deputy chairperson of the local KwaThema branch of the mainstream ANC. She served as Provincial Secretary of the ANC Women's League in Gauteng from 2003 until 2012, when she was succeeded by Mavis Mdlalose. Concurrently, she represented the ANC as a local councillor.

== Legislative career ==
Towards the end of her tenure as ANCWL Provincial Secretary, in 2011, Magagula was sworn in to an ANC seat in the Gauteng Provincial Legislature, filling a casual vacancy. She was re-elected to full terms in the legislature in the 2014 general election, ranked 17th on the ANC's provincial party list, and in the 2019 general election, ranked 29th. After the 2019 election, she was appointed Deputy Chief Whip in the provincial legislature, serving under Chief Whip Mzi Khumalo. As of 2022 she headed the ANC's parliamentary constituency office in Daveyton.
