= Maphefo Mogale-Letsie =

South African politician

Maphefo Mogale-Letsie MPL

Member of the Gauteng Provincial Legislature
- Incumbent
- Assumed office 7 September 2021

Mayor of Merafong City
- In office 2011 – 31 March 2021

Personal details
- Citizenship: South Africa
- Party: African National Congress

Maphefo Sarah Mogale-Letsie, also known as Sarah Madinge-Letsie, is a South African politician who has represented the African National Congress (ANC) in the Gauteng Provincial Legislature since 2021. She was formerly the Mayor of Merafong City from 2011 until March 2021, when her party removed her from office after she was implicated in the VBS Mutual Bank scandal.

== Mayor of Merafong ==
From 2011 to 2021, Mogale-Letsie was Executive Mayor of Merafong City Local Municipality; she was re-elected to a second term in the office after the 2016 local elections. In addition, in July 2018, she was elected Regional Chairperson of the ANC's region in the West Rand.

During her tenure in office, the municipality invested R50 million in VBS Mutual Bank, in contravention of laws prohibiting such investments by municipalities. The internal Integrity Committee of the ANC's Gauteng branch investigated her involvement. In August 2020, the committee reported that it had not found evidence of corruption but nonetheless recommended that Mogale-Letsie should "step aside" because of her "failure to take action" against municipal officials involved in corruption. She was instructed to resign as mayor and decline any further nomination to public office. The Mail & Guardian said that she and Boyce Maneli, the former West Rand Mayor who was also asked to step aside, were "considered the fall guys for the ANC".

Both Mogale-Letsie and Maneli refused to follow the Integrity Committee's recommendation and sought to appeal the decision, but, on 31 March 2021, the Merafong council removed Mogale-Letsie from her position as mayor. The opposition Democratic Alliance said that her removal, which had been supported by the ANC's majority caucus, had not been effected according to proper procedure.

== Provincial legislature ==
Mogale-Letsie remained an ordinary local councilor in Merafong until 7 September 2021, when she resigned from the council. Later the same afternoon, she was sworn into the Gauteng Provincial Legislature under the alias Sarah Madinge-Letsie; she filled a casual vacancy in the ANC caucus.

In February 2022, the ANC's National Dispute Resolution Committee cleared Mogale-Letsie of wrongdoing in the VBS saga, overturning the earlier order for her to step aside. In contradiction to the provincial Integrity Committee, the national committee found that Mogale-Letsie, while mayor, had acted swiftly to investigate and respond to the VBS allegations.
