= Joe Mpisi =

South African politician (1966–2023)

Member of the Gauteng Provincial Legislature
- In office 21 May 2014 – 12 May 2023

Provincial Chairperson of the South African Communist Party in Gauteng
- In office March 2012 – May 2023
- Deputy: Rosemary Thobejane-Ndoqo; Mandla Radebe
- Chairperson: Jacob Mamabolo

Personal details
- Born: 12 November 1966 Meadowlands, Transvaal; South Africa
- Died: 12 May 2023 (aged 56)
- Party: African National Congress
- Other political affiliations: South African Communist Party

Joe Mpisi (12 November 1966 – 12 May 2023) was a South African politician and trade unionist who represented the African National Congress (ANC) in the Gauteng Provincial Legislature from 2014 until his death. He also served as the Provincial Chairperson of the Gauteng branch of the South African Communist Party (SACP) from 2012.

== Early life and career ==
Mpisi was born on 12 November 1966 in Meadowlands, Soweto in present-day Gauteng. He matriculated at Lamola Jubilee Senior Secondary School, where he became involved in anti-apartheid politics, including through the United Democratic Front. According to Mpisi, in 1980 he joined the ANC and its close ally the SACP.

After the end of apartheid, he was active in the National Education, Health and Allied Workers' Union, an affiliate of the Congress of South African Trade Unions, where he served as a shop steward and ultimately as Deputy President. He also remained active in the SACP: in March 2012, at the Gauteng SACP's tenth provincial congress in Benoni, he was elected unopposed as SACP Provincial Chairperson; he served under Provincial Secretary Jacob Mamabolo, with Rosemary Thobejane-Ndoqo as his deputy.

== Legislative career ==
Two years after his election to the SACP chair, Mpisi was elected to the Gauteng Provincial Legislature in the 2014 general election, ranked 37th on the ANC's provincial party list. During the legislative term that followed, he was re-elected unopposed to his SACP office in May 2015 and May 2018. In 2017, he called for South African President Jacob Zuma to resign over allegations that his administration had facilitated state capture by the Gupta family.

Mpisi was re-elected to his legislative seat in the 2019 general election, ranked 31st on the ANC's party list.

== Personal life and death ==
Mpisi was married and had four children; three sons and a daughter. He was a member of Change Bible Church in Katlehong.

Mpisi died on 12 May 2023, at the age of 56.
