= Ina Cilliers =

South African politician

Ina Cilliers MPL

Member of the Gauteng Provincial Legislature
- Incumbent
- Assumed office 21 May 2014

Personal details
- Born: 14 March 1969 (age 57)
- Party: Democratic Alliance (2005–present)
- Children: 2
- Education: University of Johannesburg; University of the Witwatersrand

Agatha Wilhelmina Cilliers (born 14 March 1969) is a member of the Gauteng Provincial Legislature. She is a member of the Democratic Alliance. She was previously a DA councillor in the Merafong City Local Municipality.

== Early life and education ==
Cilliers was born on 14 March 1969. She earned a post-graduate diploma in public leadership and governance as well as a post-graduate certificate in advanced public leadership and governance from the University of the Witwatersrand. She is currently pursuing her masters of management with a focus on governance. She obtained a Bachelor of Technology degree in Business Administration and a national diploma in ambulance emergency technology from the Technikon Witwatersrand (now the University of Johannesburg).

== Career ==
Cilliers began her career as an advanced life support paramedic in the City of Johannesburg and later moved up the ranks to become a senior official in the city. In 2005 she began working at the Democratic Alliance as the national coordinator of the Association of DA Councillors. In 2007, she was appointed as the DA's provincial director in the North West. Cilliers became the DA's provincial director in Gauteng in 2009. In 2011, she was elected as a DA councillor in the Merafong City Local Municipality.

Cilliers stood as a candidate on the DA's list for the Gauteng Provincial Legislature in 2014, and was elected. After her election, she was named to the Co-operative Governance & Traditional Affairs & Human Settlement Portfolio Committee and the Economic Development, Environment, Agriculture & Rural Development Committee.

Cilliers was re-elected to a second term in the legislature in 2019. She currently sits on the Public Accounts, Finance, and Economic Development portfolio committees. Cilliers is head of the DA's Merafong constituency.

== Personal life ==
Cilliers is married and has two children.
