= Sochayile Khanyile =

South African politician (born 1964)

Sochayile Khanyile MPL

Member of the Gauteng Provincial Legislature
- Incumbent
- Assumed office 21 May 2014

Personal details
- Born: Sochayile Khanyile; 11 March 1964 (age 62)
- Citizenship: South Africa
- Party: African National Congress
- Nickname: Socks

Sochayile 'Socks' Khanyile (born 11 March 1964) is a South African politician who has represented the African National Congress (ANC) in the Gauteng Provincial Legislature since 2014. He has chaired the legislature's Standing Committee on Public Accounts since 2019 and was previously the legislature's Majority Chief Whip from 2018 to 2019. A former ANC Youth League activist, he was a member of the ANC's Provincial Executive Committee in Gauteng between 1996 and 2018.

== Early political career ==
Khanyile is a former Provincial Chairperson of the Gauteng branch of the ANC Youth League, and he joined the government soon after the end of apartheid, in 1995, as a local councilor at the now-defunct Alberton Town Council. From 2008, he worked in the Gauteng Provincial Legislature as secretary to the ANC's caucus. By that time, he was Regional Secretary of the mainstream ANC's branch in Ekurhuleni.

== Legislative career ==
In the 2014 general election, Khanyile was elected to a seat in the provincial legislature, ranked 22nd on the ANC's provincial party list. Near the end of the legislative term, in early November 2018, he was appointed Majority Chief Whip in the legislature after the incumbent, Brian Hlongwa, resigned. However, also in 2018, he failed to gain re-election to the Provincial Executive Committee of the Gauteng ANC; he had previously served on the committee since 1996.

In the 2019 general election, he was re-elected to his legislative seat, ranked 34th on the ANC's party list. He was succeeded as Chief Whip by Mzi Khumalo but was appointed to chair the legislature's Standing Committee on Public Accounts.
