= Kingsol Chabalala =

South African politician

Kingsol Chabalala MPL

Member of the Gauteng Provincial Legislature
- Incumbent
- Assumed office 21 May 2014

Personal details
- Born: Mokhaugelo Solomon Chabalala; 1976 (age 49–50) Evaton, Transvaal Province, South Africa
- Party: Democratic Alliance (2008–present)
- Spouse: Joyce
- Children: 2
- Education: Gordon Institute of Business Science; University of Johannesburg; Regenesys Business School; University of the Witwatersrand; North-West University
- Occupation: Member of the Provincial Legislature
- Profession: Politician

Mokhaugelo Solomon Chabalala (born 1976) is a South African politician and a Member of the Gauteng Provincial Legislature for the Democratic Alliance.

== Early life and education ==
Chabalala was born in 1976 in Evaton, Transvaal Province. He attended Mofolo Primary School and matriculated from Qedilizwe Secondary School. Chabalala has a certificate in strategic leadership from Gordon Institute of Business Science. He earned a post-graduate diploma in leadership and African studies from the University of Johannesburg and a national diploma in public administration from Regenesys Business School. He obtained an advanced graduate certificate from University of the Witwatersrand, a project management certificate from North-West University and a certificate in mastering leadership and management skills from AstroTech.

Chabalala also has a certificate in the 'Introduction to Law for Non-Lawyers' with the Nelson Mandela Institute at the Wits School of Law. He also holds a certificate from the DA political development program. Chabalala is currently studying towards a master's degree in international politics from the University of Johannesburg.

== Professional career ==
Chabalala has served as a board member of the Rural Development Initiative (RUDI). He has also served as a member of the church council. Chabalala served as the board chairman of Ikaheng Service Center, as a managing member of Vuka Lova Recycling Project and as a facilitator of Positive Parenting workshops.

Chabalala worked as a debtor for Mshengu's Haulega and Project CC from 2006 to 2007.

== Political career ==
Chabalala became involved in politics during his high school days in 1993 through to university as a member of South African Students Congress. He became a member of the Democratic Alliance in 2008. He currently serves as the deputy chairperson of the party's Vaal Region and has been a member of the DA provincial executive committee and the DA's Vaal regional executive committee since 2009. Chabalala has also been a DA branch chair, a constituency chair and a member of the DA's Federal Council. Chabalala has served as a constituency as well as a regional election campaign manager and has also been a member of the DA's Gauteng Provincial Elections Campaign team.

He was a LEAD Coordinator for the party in the Sedibeng District Municipality in 2009. Two years later, he was elected as a DA PR Councillor in the Emfuleni Local Municipality and served on the Petitions' Committee and IDP Steering Committee while he was a councillor. Chabalala was elected as a Member of the Gauteng Provincial Legislature in 2014. In 2016, he was selected as the DA's mayoral candidate for the Emfuleni municipality. The ANC retained crontrol of the municipality and Chabalala remained a member of the provincial legislature. He was re-elected to the provincial legislature in 2019 and 2024 general election. Chabalala serves on the Sports Recreation Arts and Culture Portfolio Committee, as well as the Petitions Standing Committee.

On 14 February 2026, Chabalala was named the DA's mayoral candidate for the Emfuleni municipality for the upcoming municipal elections.

== Personal life ==
Chabalala is married to Joyce. They have two children: Nhlanhla and Zinhle.

On 11 August 2017, Chabalala was shot three times outside his home in the Vaal.
