= Refiloe Nt'sekhe =

South African politician

Refiloe Nt'sekhe MPL
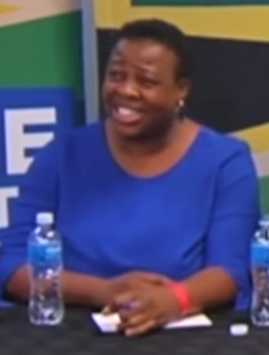

Deputy Speaker of the Gauteng Provincial Legislature
- In office 14 June 2024 – 9 July 2024
- Speaker: Morakane Mosupyoe
- Preceded by: Nomvuyo Mhlakaza-Manamela
- Succeeded by: Nomvuyo Mhlakaza-Manamela

Deputy Federal Chairperson of the Democratic Alliance
- In office 10 May 2015 – 2 April 2023
- Leader: John Steenhuisen; Mmusi Maimane

Member of the Gauteng Provincial Legislature
- Incumbent
- Assumed office 21 May 2014

Personal details
- Born: Refiloe Nt’sekhe; 28 April 1977 (age 49)
- Party: Democratic Alliance
- Education: University of Cape Town
- Occupation: Member of the Provincial Legislature
- Profession: Politician

Refiloe Nt'sekhe (born 28 April 1977) is a South African politician who has been a Member of the Provincial Legislature since 2014. She served as Deputy Speaker of the Gauteng Provincial Legislature from June to July 2024. A member of the Democratic Alliance, she served as one of the party's deputy federal chairpersons between 2015 and 2023 and as one of the party's national spokespeople between 2015 and 2020.

== Early life and career ==
Nt'sekhe was born on 28 April 1977. She obtained a degree in politics and philosophy at the University of Cape Town. She later achieved a post-graduate degree in marketing from the same university. During her student years in the 1990s, she became a member of the South African Liberal Students Association (SALSA). She joined the DA in 2001.

Nt'sekhe worked for the Foschini Group, Capespan, South African Airways, Absa Group Limited and the South African Broadcasting Corporation, before becoming active in politics.

== Political career ==
In 2009, she was appointed the DA's national director at the LEAD programme. She was elected the ward councillor for ward 24 of the City of Ekurhuleni Metropolitan Municipality in the 2011 municipal election. The party's branch in Tembisa soon elected her as constituency head. The following year, the DA named her its provincial spokesperson in Gauteng.

Prior to the 2014 general election, Nt'sekhe's name appeared on the DA's candidate list for the Gauteng Provincial Legislature. She was elected and took office as an MPL on 21 May 2014. In November 2014, she challenged incumbent John Moodey for Gauteng DA provincial leader. Moodey won the election. At the 2015 Democratic Alliance Federal Congress, she was elected as one of three Deputy Federal Chairpersons. Nt'sekhe was also appointed the DA's national spokesperson in July 2015 following the resignation of Marius Redelinghuys. She served alongside Phumzile van Damme until Van Damme resigned in February 2018 and was replaced by Solly Malatsi in June.

At the party's elective conference in 2018, she won another term as a Deputy Federal Chairperson. She was re-elected as an MPL in the 2019 general election. Nt'sekhe is currently the party's Shadow MEC for Social Development.

Nt'sekhe was re-elected as the first DA deputy federal chairperson at the party's Federal Congress held between 31 October and 1 November 2020. She served alongside Jacques Smalle and Anton Bredell. On 24 November 2020, Siviwe Gwarube was announced as the new national spokesperson of the DA.

On 23 August 2021, DA leader John Steenhuisen announced Nt'sekhe as the DA's mayoral candidate for the City of Ekurhuleni in the 2021 local government elections. In the local government election of 1 November 2021, no party obtained a majority in Ekurhuleni city council. The DA finished second again with 28.72% of the vote, behind the ruling African National Congress's 38.19%. The DA Gauteng leadership then encouraged her to resign as the DA's mayoral candidate and as an incoming councillor, because it seemed unlikely that she would be elected mayor since the DA decided against working with the ANC or the Economic Freedom Fighters, the kingmakers in council. At the inaugural council meeting on 22 November, the DA's Ekurhuleni caucus leader, Tania Campbell, was unexpectedly elected as Executive Mayor with the help of the EFF and smaller parties. Nt'sekhe described Campbell's election as a "bittersweet moment" for her because the ANC was unseated from power.

Nt'sekhe unsuccessfully stood for re-election as the party's Federal Congress in 2023.

As the ANC lost its majority in the Gauteng Provincial Legislature in the 2024 provincial election, the party formed a coalition with other parties, including the DA, to govern the province. Nt'sekhe was elected deputy speaker of the provincial legislature as part of the coalition agreements. Following the collapse of negotiations between the DA and the ANC, Nt'sekhe resigned as deputy speaker on 9 July 2024.

== Personal life ==
Nt'sekhe was married and has three children.
