= Anton Alberts (politician) =

South African lawyer and politician (born 1970)

Member of the Gauteng Provincial Legislature
- Incumbent
- Assumed office 2019

Member of the National Assembly of South Africa
- In office 2014–2019
- Constituency: Gauteng

Personal details
- Born: Anton De Waal Alberts; 1970 (age 55–56)
- Party: Freedom Front Plus
- Education: University of Johannesburg
- Occupation: Politician
- Profession: Lawyer

Anton De Waal Alberts (born 1970) is a South African lawyer and politician. He serves as a member of the Gauteng Provincial Legislature as leader of the Freedom Front Plus.

== Early life ==
Anton De Waal Alberts was born in 1970. He graduated from the Randse Afrikaanse Universiteit, where he earned an LLB degree, followed by a master's degree in International Law in 1998.

== Career ==
Alberts taught the Law at his alma mater, the University of Johannesburg, as well as Technikon South Africa (now part of the University of South Africa), the University of the Witwatersrand and Rhodes University.

He is a member of Freedom Front Plus, where he serves as the National Chairperson. Between 2009–2019, Alberts has served as a member of the National Assembly of South Africa. After the 2019 general election he was elected to the Gauteng Provincial Legislature.

== Personal life ==
Alberts resides in Gauteng, South Africa.
