= 2019 Gauteng provincial election =

Provincial election in South Africa

← 2014	8 May 2019	2024 →

All 73 seats to the Gauteng Provincial Legislature 37 seats needed for a majority
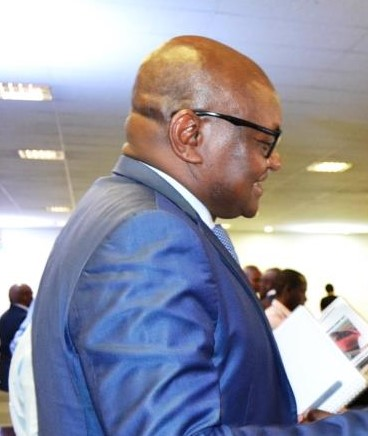

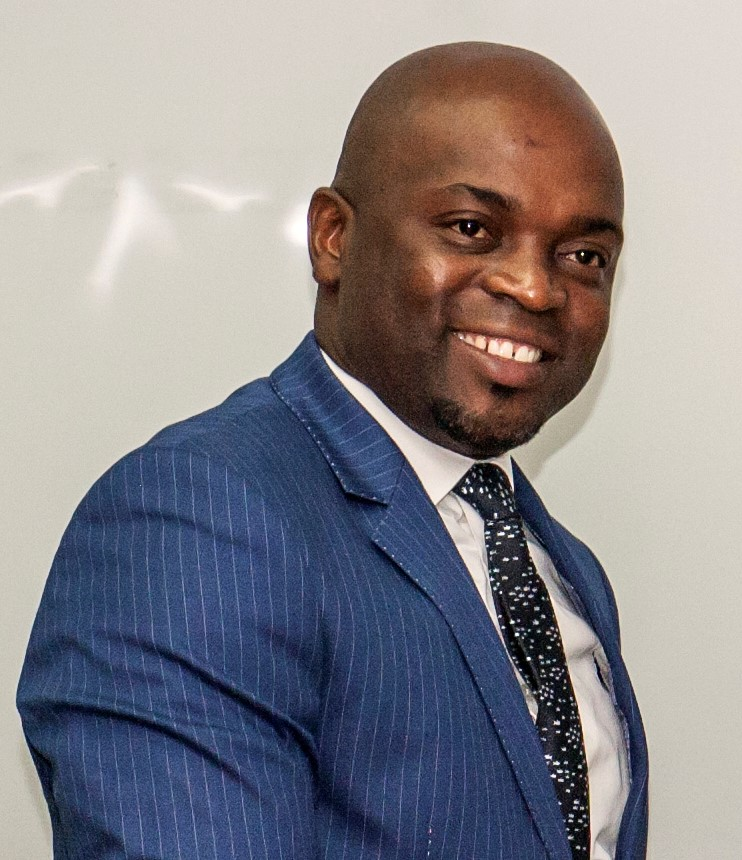

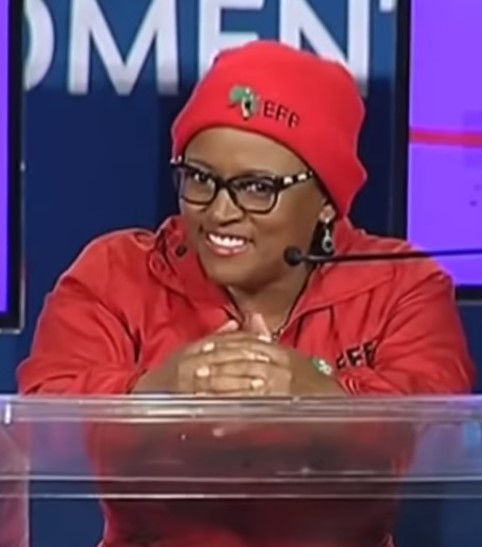
	First party	Second party	Third party
Candidate	David Makhura	Solly Msimanga	Mandisa Mashego
Party	ANC	DA	EFF
Last election	53.59%	30.78%	10.30%
Seats before	40	23	8
Seats won	37	20	11
Seat change	▼3	▼3	▲3
Popular vote	2,168,253	1,185,743	634,387
Percentage	50.19%	27.45%	14.69%
Swing	▼3.40%	▼3.33%	▲4.39%
	Fourth party	Fifth party	Sixth party
	FF+	IFP	ACDP
Candidate	Anton Alberts	Bonginkosi Wesley Dhlamini	Dulton Adams
Party	Freedom Front Plus	Inkatha Freedom Party	African Christian Democratic Party
Last election	1.20%	0.78%	0.62%
Seats before	1	1	0
Seats won	3	1	1
Seat change	▲2	0	▲1
Popular vote	153,844	38,263	30,605
Percentage	3.56%	0.89%	0.71%
Swing	▲2.36%	▲0.11%	▲0.09%
Premier before election
David Makhura
African National Congress
Elected Premier
David Makhura
African National Congress

The 2019 Gauteng provincial election was held on 8 May 2019, concurrently with the 2019 South African general election, to elect the 73 members of the Gauteng Provincial Legislature.

Incumbent Premier David Makhura led the ruling African National Congress (ANC), with the party attempting to retain its majority status and secure Makhura a second full term in office as premier. The media and political analysts widely expected that the ANC would lose its majority in the Gauteng Provincial Legislature, therefore it was considered to be the most hotly-contested province in this election cycle.

The Official Opposition Democratic Alliance (DA) nominated Mayor of Tshwane Solly Msimanga to be its premier candidate. Msimanga was elected Tshwane Mayor in the aftermath of the 2016 South African municipal elections as the ANC had lost its majority in the Tshwane City Council. The DA also manage to gain control of the City of Johannesburg and Mogale City.

The Economic Freedom Fighters (EFF), which won 8 seats and clinched the title of the third largest party in 2014, was expected to grow in this election, possibly holding the balance of power, if the ANC had lost its majority.

The fourth largest party in the provincial legislature, the Freedom Front Plus (FF+), saw Gauteng as a province of significant importance for its election campaign. The party nominated Member of Parliament and advocate Anton Alberts as its premier candidate.

The provincial election was won by the ruling ANC, but with a reduced seat total of only 37 seats, the threshold for a majority. The DA underperformed and lost support in this election, losing a total of three seats, which only gave the party 20 seats in the provincial legislature. The EFF grew its support and won three additional seats. The FF+ gained two seats, while the Inkatha Freedom Party (IFP) retained its sole seat. The African Christian Democratic Party (ACDP) returned to the provincial legislature by winning one seat.

== Results ==
Party	Votes	%	+/–	Seats	+/–
African National Congress	2,168,253	50.19	–3.40	37	–3
Democratic Alliance	1,185,743	27.45	–3.33	20	–3
Economic Freedom Fighters	634,387	14.69	+4.39	11	+3
Freedom Front Plus	153,844	3.56	+2.36	3	+2
Inkatha Freedom Party	38,263	0.89	+0.11	1	0
African Christian Democratic Party	30,605	0.71	+0.09	1	+1
African Transformation Movement	10,861	0.25	New	0	New
Pan Africanist Congress	10,534	0.24	–0.02	0	0
Congress of the People	10,197	0.24	–0.25	0	0
United Democratic Movement	9,267	0.21	–0.23	0	0
African Independent Congress	9,016	0.21	New	0	New
Good	8,544	0.20	New	0	New
Al Jama-ah	7,606	0.18	New	0	New
Black First Land First	5,773	0.13	New	0	New
Socialist Revolutionary Workers Party	5,465	0.13	New	0	New
Azanian People's Organisation	3,516	0.08	–0.04	0	0
National Freedom Party	3,177	0.07	–0.40	0	0
Agang South Africa	3,158	0.07	–0.35	0	0
African People's Convention	3,128	0.07	–0.09	0	0
African Covenant	2,528	0.06	New	0	New
Women Forward	2,050	0.05	+0.05	0	0
Patriotic Alliance	1,773	0.04	0.00	0	0
Economic Emancipation Forum	1,700	0.04	New	0	New
Independent Civic Organisation	1,470	0.03	+0.01	0	0
Alliance for Transformation for All	1,401	0.03	New	0	New
African Content Movement	1,251	0.03	New	0	New
National People’s Front	1,125	0.03	New	0	New
African Renaissance Unity Party	927	0.02	New	0	New
African Democratic Change	918	0.02	New	0	New
International Revelation Congress	722	0.02	New	0	New
Gazankulu Liberation Congress	672	0.02	New	0	New
Better Residents Association	525	0.01	New	0	New
Land Party	511	0.01	New	0	New
Power of Africans Unity	470	0.01	New	0	New
South African National Congress of Traditional Authorities	367	0.01	New	0	New
Zenzeleni Progressive Movement	190	0.00	New	0	New
Total	4,319,937	100.00	–	73	0
Valid votes	4,319,937	99.14			
Invalid/blank votes	37,411	0.86			
Total votes	4,357,348	100.00			
Registered voters/turnout	6,381,220	68.28			
Source: Election Resources
