= John Moodey =

South African politician (born 1958)

Director of Operations for ActionSA
- Incumbent
- Assumed office 29 August 2020
- President: Herman Mashaba
- Preceded by: Position established

Leader of the Opposition in the Gauteng Provincial Legislature
- In office 21 May 2014 – 22 May 2019
- Preceded by: Jack Bloom
- Succeeded by: Solly Msimanga

Provincial Leader of the Democratic Alliance in Gauteng
- In office 10 March 2012 – 2 September 2020
- Preceded by: Janet Semple
- Succeeded by: Solly Msimanga (acting)
- In office 12 March 2007 – 18 April 2010
- Preceded by: Ian Davidson
- Succeeded by: Janet Semple

Member of the Gauteng Provincial Legislature
- In office 14 April 2004 – 2 September 2020

Personal details
- Born: John Clifford Moodey; 22 November 1958 (age 67) Doornfontein, Johannesburg, Transvaal Province
- Party: Democratic Alliance (2000–2020)
- Other political affiliations: Democratic Party (1998–2000); ActionSA (2020-present)
- Occupation: Member of the Provincial Legislature
- Profession: Politician

John Clifford Moodey (born 22 November 1958) is a South African politician who is currently serving a Member of the Gauteng Provincial Legislature on behalf of ActionSA.

He previously served as the Provincial Leader of the Democratic Alliance (DA) in Gauteng from 2007 to 2010 and from 2012 to 2020. Moodey was a Member of the Gauteng Provincial Legislature from 2004 to 2020 and served as Leader of the Opposition from 2014 to 2019. He was the party's Shadow MEC for Community Safety.

== Early life ==
John Clifford Moodey was born on 22 November 1958 in Doornfontein, a suburb of Johannesburg. He and his family were later evicted and forced to move due to the Group Areas Act. He became an activist while he was still in school.

== Political career ==
Moodey was previously a trade unionist and served on the executive of the Combined Employers Union. He joined the Democratic Party in 1998, which became the Democratic Alliance in 2000. He was elected to the Johannesburg City Council in 2000 as the ward councillor for Florida. He became chairperson of the DA caucus in 2001 and soon deputy chairperson of the party in Gauteng South in 2002.

He became Provincial Chairperson of the DA in 2004. In the same year, he was appointed a Member of the Gauteng Provincial Legislature. He was elected Provincial Leader of the party in 2007, succeeding Ian Davidson to become the party's first black leader in Gauteng. At the DA's October 2009 provincial conference, in a bid to secure re-election, Moodey's campaign sent out SMS's displaying false information. The provincial conference was nullified and disciplinary steps were taken against Moodey. A second provincial conference was promptly called for and held in April 2010, in which former DA MP Janet Semple defeated Moodey by just 8 votes.

In January 2012, Semple announced her retirement as the provincial leader. Moodey declared his intention to contest the position at the party's conference in March. He was endorsed by Semple and DA Federal Youth Leader Makashule Gana. Moodey defeated MP Ian Ollis.

In November 2014, Moodey was re-elected for another term after he defeated MPL Refiloe Nt'sekhe. He secured another term in November 2017 after he defeated Ghaleb Cachalia.

In February 2020, Moodey announced that he would be retiring as provincial leader ahead of the party's upcoming provincial conference to be held later on in the year. On 24 February 2020, he announced that he would run for DA Federal Leader at the party's Federal Congress, which was scheduled to be held in May. The elective conference was postponed to October 2020 due to the coronavirus outbreak and Moodey temporarily suspended all campaign activities.

On 2 September 2020, Moodey resigned from the Democratic Alliance, citing race and an internal disciplinary proceeding. He joined Herman Mashaba's ActionSA in October.

On the 14th of June 2024, he was officially sworn in as ActionSA's Member of the Gauteng Provincial Legislature.

== Personal life ==
Moodey is married to Barenice. They have children and grandchildren. They reside in Florida, Gauteng.
