= 2024 Gauteng provincial election =

Election in South Africa

- 29 May 2024

All 80 seats in the Provincial Legislature 41 seats needed for a majority
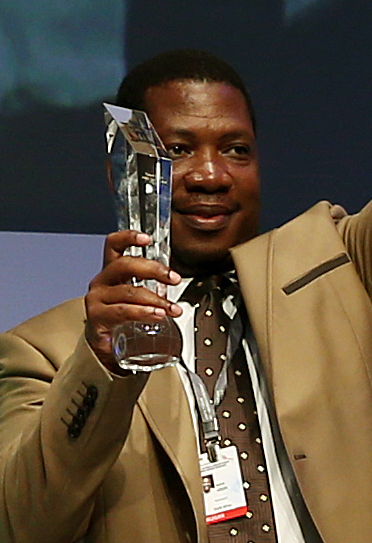

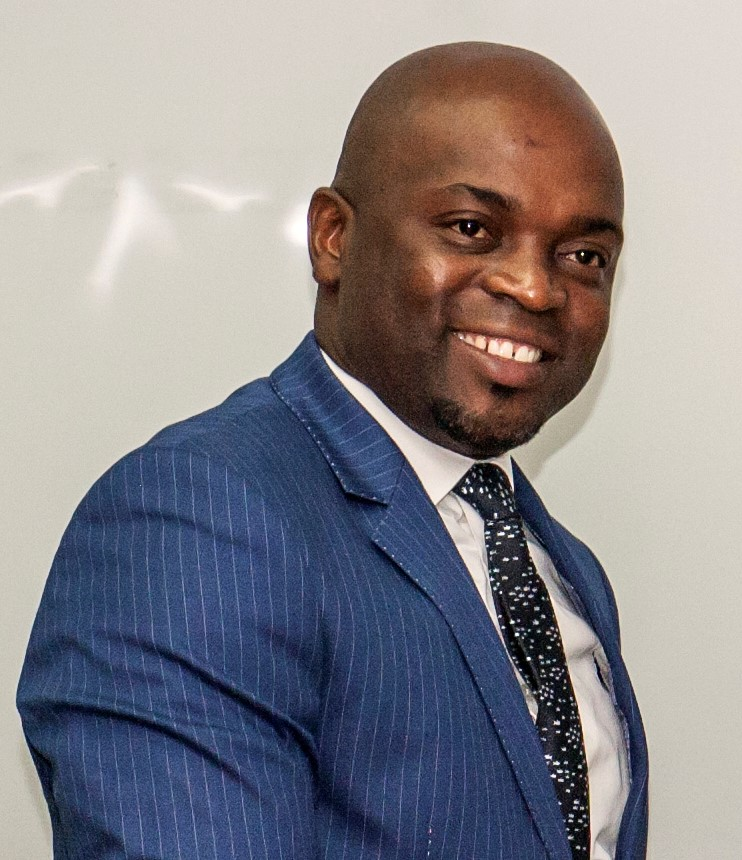

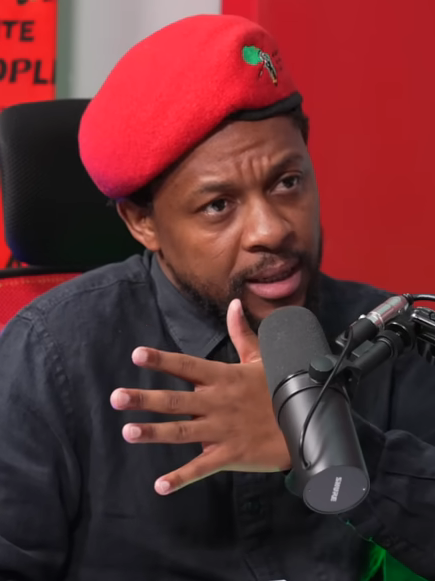
	First party	Second party	Third party
Leader	Panyaza Lesufi	Solly Msimanga	Mbuyiseni Ndlozi
Party	ANC	DA	EFF
Last election	37 seats, 50.19%	20 seats, 27.45%	11 seats, 14.69%
Seats won	28	22	11
Seat change	▼9	▲2	Steady
Popular vote	1,367,248	1,079,229	508,390
Percentage	34.76%	27.44%	12.93%
Swing	▼15.43	▼0.02	▼1.74
Premier before election
Panyaza Lesufi
ANC
Elected Premier
Panyaza Lesufi
ANC

The 2024 Gauteng provincial election was held on 29 May 2024, concurrently with the 2024 South African general election, to elect the 73 members of the Gauteng Provincial Legislature.

The African National Congress (ANC), led by current Premier Panyaza Lesufi, lost its majority in the Provincial Legislature for the first time since the end of apartheid in 1994. The main opposition party, the Democratic Alliance (DA), led by Solly Msimanga, gained two seats despite a very small swing against the party. With a margin of just 7.32% between the ANC and the DA, Gauteng was the closest province in the country.

Gauteng was a highly-contested province, as it is the most populous province of South Africa, as well as the de facto economic hub of South Africa. It is also home to Johannesburg, the most populous city in South Africa.

== Background ==
The 2019 provincial election was won by the ruling ANC, but with a reduced seat total of only 37 seats, the threshold for a majority. The DA underperformed and lost support in this election, losing a total of three seats, which only gave the party 20 seats in the provincial legislature. The EFF grew its support and won three additional seats. The FF+ gained two seats, while the Inkatha Freedom Party (IFP) retained its sole seat. The African Christian Democratic Party (ACDP) returned to the provincial legislature by winning one seat.

== Results ==
Party	Votes	%	+/–	Seats	+/–
African National Congress	1,367,248	34.76	▼15.43	28	▼9
Democratic Alliance	1,079,229	27.44	▼0.02	22	▲2
Economic Freedom Fighters	508,390	12.93	▼1.74	11	0
uMkhonto we Sizwe	384,968	9.79	New	8	New
ActionSA	163,541	4.16	New	3	New
Freedom Front Plus	91,521	2.33	▼2.23	2	▼1
Patriotic Alliance	79,964	2.03	▲1.99	2	▲2
Rise Mzansi	38,496	0.98	New	1	New
Inkatha Freedom Party	34,250	0.87	▼0.02	1	0
Build One South Africa	29,978	0.76	New	1	New
African Christian Democratic Party	29,163	0.74	▲0.03	1	0
Al Jama-ah	14,675	0.37	▲0.19	0	0
African Transformation Movement	11,419	0.29	▲0.04	0	0
Pan Africanist Congress of Azania	11,227	0.29	▲0.05	0	0
United Africans Transformation	9,220	0.23	New	0	New
Hope4SA	8,748	0.22	New	0	New
United Democratic Movement	7,567	0.19	▼0.02	0	0
Arise SA	5,723	0.15	New	0	New
Good	5,307	0.13	▼0.07	0	0
Congress of the People	5,151	0.13	▼0.11	0	0
Azanian People's Organisation	4,877	0.12	▲0.04	0	0
African Independent Congress	4,371	0.11	▼0.10	0	0
Allied Movement for Change	4,348	0.11	New	0	New
African Heart Congress	3,938	0.10	New	0	New
Basic Income Grant SA	3,079	0.08	New	0	New
South African Rainbow Alliance	2,745	0.07	New	0	New
Action Alliance Development Party	2,716	0.07	New	0	New
Operation Dudula	2,664	0.07	New	0	New
African Congress for Transformation	2,384	0.06	New	0	New
African People's Convention	2,308	0.06	▲0.01	0	0
Economic Liberators Forum South Africa	1,512	0.04	New	0	New
Alliance of Citizens for Change	1,482	0.04	New	0	New
Forum for Service Delivery	1,322	0.03	New	0	New
Africa Restoration Alliance	1,284	0.03	New	0	New
National Freedom Party	1,248	0.03	▼0.04	0	0
Africa Africans Reclaim	1,239	0.03	New	0	New
Xiluva	980	0.02	New	0	New
Sizwe Ummah Nation	810	0.02	New	0	New
Bolsheviks Party of South Africa	797	0.02	New	0	New
Azania Peaceful Revolution	794	0.02	New	0	New
African Independent People's Organisation	727	0.02	New	0	New
Mogano Tshepo Johannes	650	0.02	New	0	New
Cibi Bonganni Wellington	503	0.01	New	0	New
African People First	407	0.01	New	0	New
African Movement Congress	277	0.01	New	0	New
Total	3,933,247	100.00	–	80	▲7
Valid votes	3,933,247	99.15			
Invalid/blank votes	33,794	0.85			
Total votes	3,967,041	100.00			
Registered voters/turnout	6,541,978	60.64			
Source: Electoral Commission of South Africa

== Aftermath ==
The ANC lost its majority for the first time in the provincial party's history, losing 9 seats in the legislature. The DA won 2 more seats and the PA won 2 seats, while the VF+ lost one seat. Finally, the new MK, ActionSA, Rise Mzansi and BOSA parties all won seats, and the EFF, IFP and ACDP all retained the same share of seats as the previous election. As a result, no party won overall control of the legislature, forcing consideration of a coalition government. On 15 June, the new legislature was sworn in and held elections of the Premier, Deputy Premier, heads of committees and provincial delegates to the National Council of Provinces. Lesufi was re-elected premier, and began coalition negotiations with other parties for forming the Executive Council. President Cyril Ramaphosa was reported to have ordered Lesufi to include the DA in cabinet negotiations, but Lesufi publicly rejected the claim. On 3 July 2024, the DA walked away from talks with Lesufi and will sit in opposition.
