= Solly Msimanga =

South African politician (born 1980)

Solly Msimanga MPL
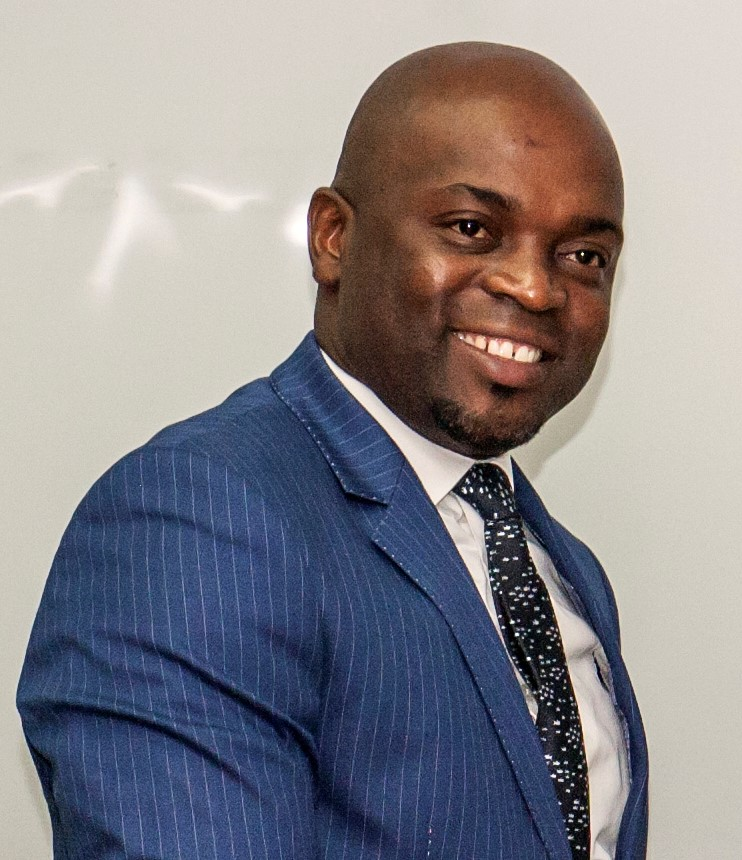
- Msimanga in 2017

Federal Chairperson of the Democratic Alliance
- Incumbent
- Assumed office 12 April 2026
- Leader: Geordin Hill-Lewis
- Preceded by: Ivan Meyer

Provincial Leader of the Democratic Alliance in Gauteng
- Incumbent
- Assumed office 14 November 2020; Acting: 2 September 2020 - 14 November 2020
- Preceded by: John Moodey

Leader of the Opposition in the Gauteng Provincial Legislature
- Incumbent
- Assumed office 22 May 2019
- Premier: David Makhura; Panyaza Lesufi
- Preceded by: John Moodey

Mayor of Tshwane
- In office 19 August 2016 – 11 February 2019
- Preceded by: Kgosientso Ramokgopa
- Succeeded by: Stevens Mokgalapa

Member of the Gauteng Provincial Legislature
- Incumbent
- Assumed office 12 February 2019
- In office 21 May 2014 – 19 August 2016

Provincial Chairperson of the Democratic Alliance in Gauteng
- In office 22 November 2014 – 18 November 2017
- Preceded by: Michael Moriarty
- Succeeded by: Michael Moriarty

Personal details
- Born: Solly Tshepiso Msimanga; 16 July 1980 (age 46) Atteridgeville, Pretoria, South Africa
- Party: Democratic Alliance (2006–present)
- Spouse: Monde Msimanga (former)
- Children: Amogelang Msimanga; Aobokwe Msimanga
- Education: University of Pretoria (BCompt)

Solly Tshepiso Msimanga (born 16 July 1980) is a South African politician who has served as the Federal Chairperson of the Democratic Alliance since April 2026 and the Leader of the Opposition in the Gauteng Provincial Legislature since May 2019. He has been a Member of the Gauteng Provincial Legislature since February 2019, having previously served from 2014 to 2016.

Msimanga was the Executive Mayor of the City of Tshwane Metropolitan Municipality from 2016 to 2019. He was DA Provincial Chairperson from 2014 to 2017 and has been the DA Provincial Leader since 2020. Msimanga was the DA's unsuccessful Gauteng Premier candidate for the 2019 and the 2024 elections.

== Early life and education ==
Solly Tshepiso Msimanga was born in Atteridgeville, a township west of Pretoria. He attended Isaac Moré Primary School, Patogeng Higher Primary and Saulridge High School. He obtained a national diploma in marketing management and a BCompt from the University of Pretoria.

== Career ==
Msimanga worked with Project Literacy and was enlisted at the Liberian embassy at one stage. Later on, he was employed by the United States embassy. He had been a national director for Legal Education And Development. He also held multiple senior management positions in the private sector.

=== Entry into politics ===
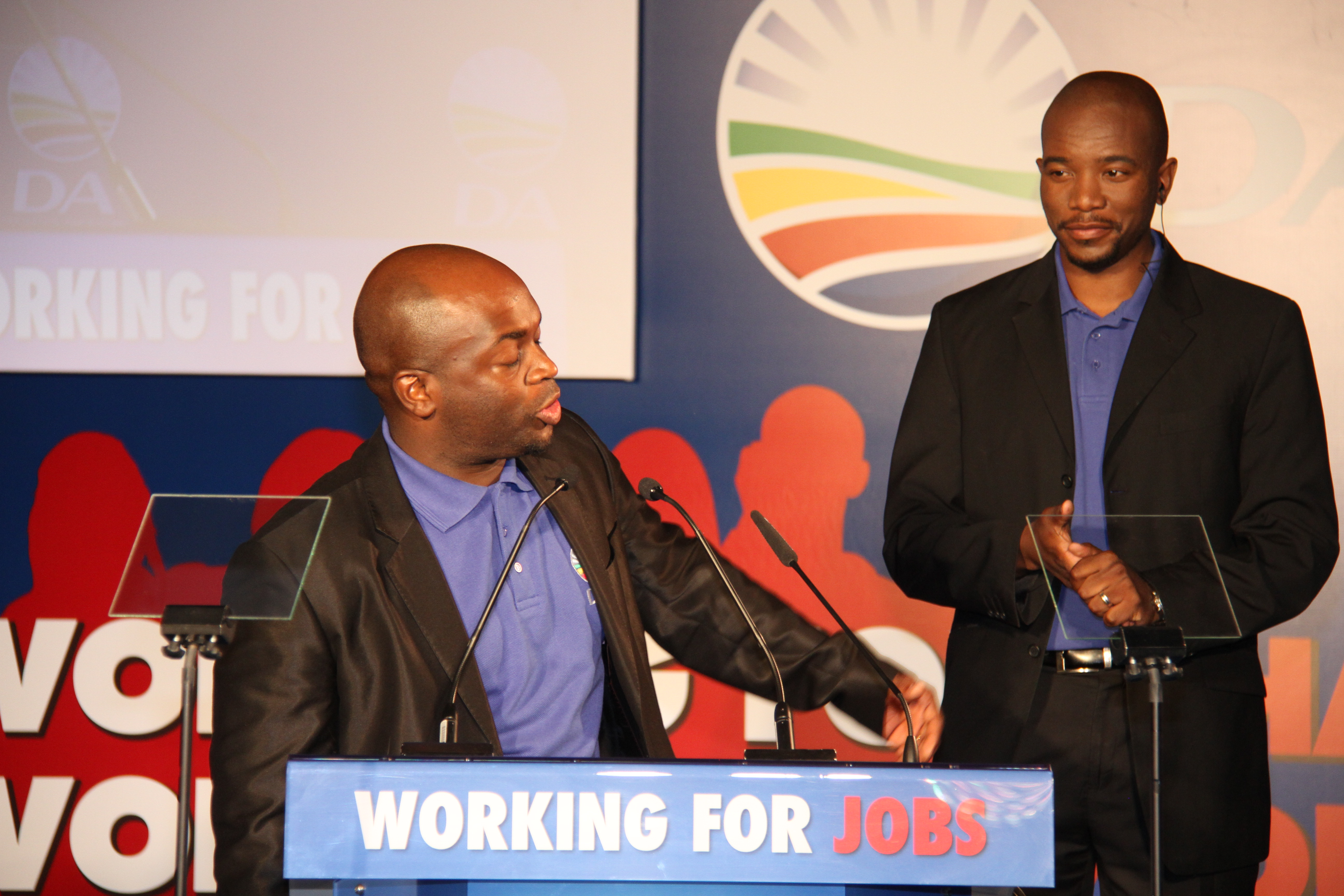
Msimanga delivers a speech, while Mmusi Maimane watches in the background.

Msimanga first joined the DA in 2006. After having attended a DA event, he wrote to the party criticising its campaign approach and was soon offered a staff position by the party's CEO, Ryan Coetzee.

He eventually began rising through the ranks of the party. In May 2011, he was elected to the Tshwane City Council, and in the same year, he became the leader of the DA's Gauteng North region.

In May 2014, Msimanga was elected as a Member of the Gauteng Provincial Legislature. He was appointed the party's provincial spokesperson for sports and served on the Education and Economic Development Portfolio Committees in the legislature.

=== DA leadership elections ===
In November 2014, he succeeded Michael Moriarty as DA Provincial Chairperson, after Moriarty had stood down.

In November 2017, Moriarty succeeded Msimanga as DA Provincial Chairperson at the party's Provincial Congress, after Msimanga took the decision to not run for re-election.

In March 2018, Msimanga declared himself a candidate for the position of Federal Chairperson of the Democratic Alliance ahead of the party's Federal Congress. On 8 April 2018, he lost to incumbent Athol Trollip.

In February 2026, Msimanga announced he had accepted a nomination to run for the role of Federal Chairperson of the DA.

=== Mayoral career ===
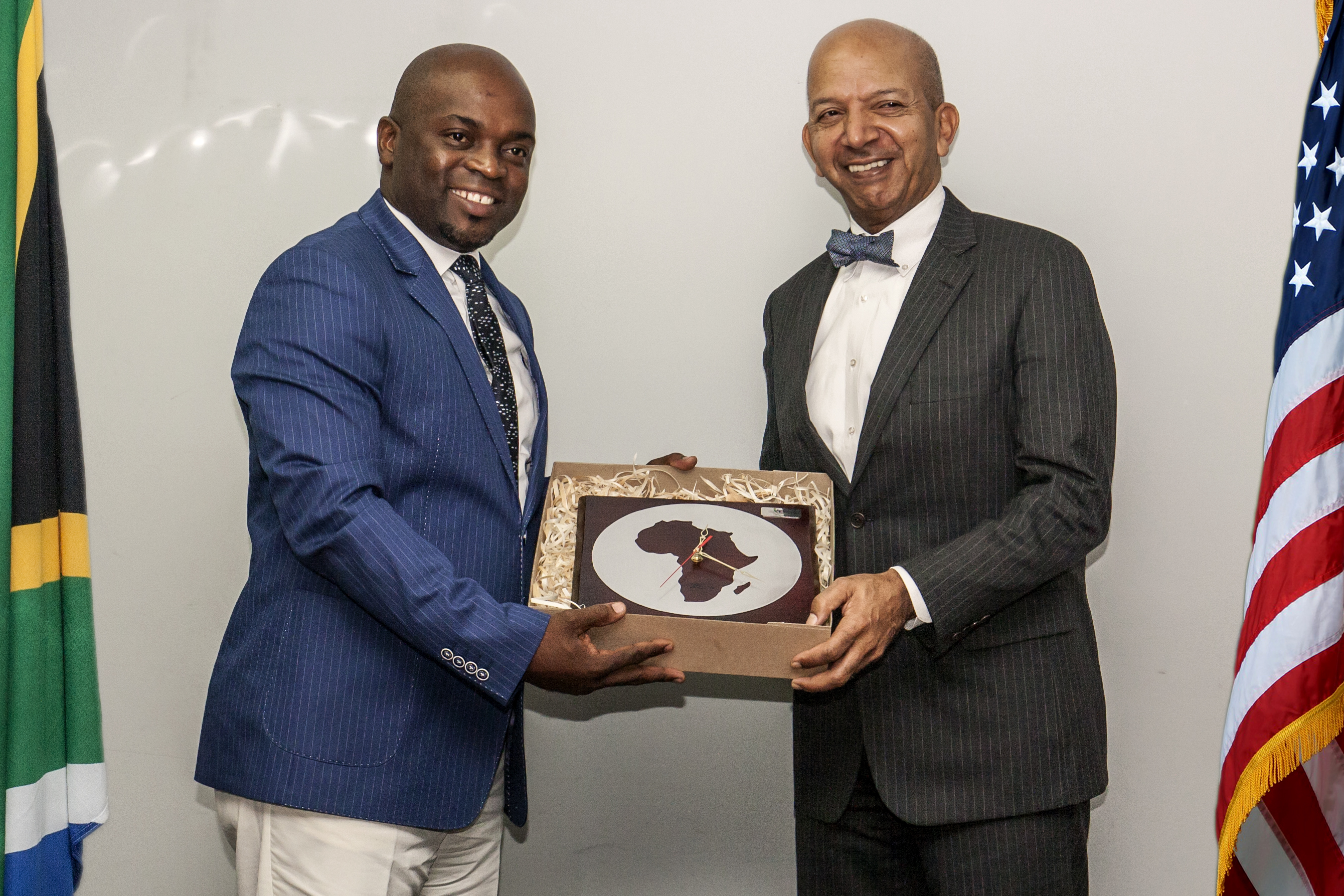
Msimanga met with former Mayor of Washington DC, USA Anthony A. Williams on 13 February 2019. Msimanga gave Williams a gift to celebrate their meeting, which focused on urban renewal.

In September 2015, Msimanga was announced as the DA's mayoral candidate for the City of Tshwane in the 2016 municipal elections. He defeated Brandon Topham and Bronwyn Engelbrecht for the nomination. The DA emerged as the largest party after the election, but without a majority. By forming a coalition with several smaller parties, and with the support of the Economic Freedom Fighters, Msimanga was elected unopposed as the Executive Mayor of Tshwane. He was the first DA member to hold the post.

When he was elected Mayor, he stated his intention to outlaw blue-lights brigades in the City — for everyone except the President. “The only VIPs in the City will be the residents of the City,” he said.

In May 2018, it was revealed that Msimanga's chief of staff Marietha Aucamp had been dishonest about her qualifications. She was placed on special leave on 16 May 2018. She resigned on 17 May 2018. In June 2018, an inquiry found that she had misrepresented her qualifications. It also found that her appointment was unlawful.

In August 2018, both the Economic Freedom Fighters (EFF) and African National Congress (ANC) had tabled motions of no confidence to remove Msimanga as Mayor. On 30 August 2018, Tshwane Council Speaker Katlego Mathebe declined to proceed with the EFF's motion of no confidence because it did not comply with the council's rules. The EFF subsequently staged a walkout out of the council chamber. The party's caucus leader said that it would not support the ANC's motion. Due to the lack of support, the ANC withdrew its motion.

On 27 September 2018, he survived another motion of no confidence tabled by the ANC. The EFF abstained from voting. Ninety-five councillors voted against the motion, while seventy-seven voted for it. Twenty-one councillors abstained.

Msimanga's last months as Mayor were overshadowed by the irregular awarding of a multi-billion-rand tender contract to GladAfrica by embattled City Manager Moeketsi Mosola. Msimanga tried to suspend Mosola, and the DA caucus of the Tshwane City Council attempted multiple times to remove Mosola from the position. Mosola announced in July 2019 that he would step down as the City Manager of Tshwane.

On 18 January 2019, Msimanga announced that he was stepping down as Mayor of Tshwane to focus on his Gauteng premiership campaign. He also said that his resignation would be finalised in the first two weeks of February. He later announced on 31 January 2019 that he would effectively resign on 11 February 2019. Msimanga was succeeded by Stevens Mokgalapa. Msimanga was subsequently sworn in as a Member of the Gauteng Provincial Legislature.

=== 2019 Gauteng premiership campaign ===
On 19 August 2018, Msimanga was announced as the party's Gauteng Premier candidate for the 2019 general elections. He defeated many prominent candidates for the nomination, including Member of the Gauteng Provincial Legislature Makashule Gana, Member of Parliament Ghaleb Cachalia, and Party Spokesperson Refiloe Nt'sekhe.

On 8 May 2019, the African National Congress narrowly retained their majority in the Gauteng Provincial Legislature with a total of 50.19% of the vote. The Democratic Alliance remained the official opposition, but lost three seats, giving them a total of twenty seats in the provincial legislature. Msimanga was elected DA caucus leader on 17 May 2019 and officially assumed the post of Leader of the Opposition on 22 May 2019.

=== Provincial leadership ===
Msimanga was selected as the party's acting provincial leader on 2 September 2020, after incumbent John Moodey had resigned from the party. He ran for a full term at the party's provincial congress in November and defeated party veteran James Lorimer in a landslide of 75% against Lorimer's 25%.

At the DA's Provincial Congress held on 12 August 2023, Msimanga defeated Khume Ramulifho to win a second term as provincial leader.

=== 2024 Gauteng premiership campaign ===
On 13 September 2023, DA leader John Steenhuisen announced Msimanga as the party's Gauteng premier candidate for the 2024 provincial election. The ruling ANC lost their majority in the election, but still remained the largest party. The DA remained the second largest party, winning two more seats. On 14 June 2024, the DA voted to re-elect Lesufi as part of a coalition agreement. The party withdrew from the coalition on 3 July 2024 after saying that Lesufi's offer made to them was unfair and unreasonable and took up the position as official opposition with Msimanga remaining as the leader of the opposition.

=== Federal Chairperson of the Democratic Alliance: 2026–present ===
On 27 February 2026, Msimanga announced his candidacy for Federal Chairperson of the DA, ahead of the party's Federal Congress in April. He was elected to the position at the party's Federal Congress on 12 April 2026, defeating the incumbent Ivan Meyer. Msimanga has said that he would remain as Provincial Leader until the next provincial congress.

== Personal life ==
He married Monde Msimanga in 2006. They had two children named Amogelang and Aobokwe. Solly and Monde worked together on the charity organisation named “Make Somebody’s Christmas a Merry One”. The project donates groceries to disadvantaged families. The couple later divorced before Monde died in June 2022. In 2024, Msimanga married again.

=== Sexual harassment allegation ===
In October 2020, DA MPL Nkele Molapo filed a sexual harassment case against Msimanga. Msimanga denies the allegation and says that he is willing to take a lie detector test to prove his innocence. He has also responded by opening a crimen injuria case against Molapo.

=== 2021 assault ===
On 6 May 2021, Msimanga was assaulted by an unidentified man while visiting his cousin in Benoni, Gauteng. The man was a business partner of Msimanga's cousin and claimed that Msimanga owed him R1,4 million. The man later apologised and said that it was a "misunderstanding" and that no money is owed. The DA welcomed the man's arrest.

Political offices
Preceded by John Moodey	Leader of the Opposition in the Gauteng Provincial Legislature; 2019–present	Incumbent
Preceded by Kgosientso Ramokgopa	Mayor of Tshwane; 2016–2019	Succeeded by Stevens Mokgalapa
Party political offices
Preceded by Michael Moriarty	Provincial Chairperson of the Gauteng Democratic Alliance; 2014–2017	Succeeded by Michael Moriarty
Preceded by John Moodey	Provincial Leader of the Gauteng Democratic Alliance; 2020–present	Incumbent
Preceded by Ivan Meyer	Federal Chairperson of the Democratic Alliance; 2026–present	Incumbent
