= Gauteng Provincial Legislature =

South African provincial legislative body

Gauteng Provincial Legislature List: Gauteng Provinsiale Wetgewer (Afrikaans)
- 7th Legislature

Type
- Type: Unicameral

History
- Founded: 27 April 1994

Leadership
- Speaker: Morakane Mosupyoe, ANC since 14 June 2014
- Deputy Speaker: Nomvuyo Mhlakaza-Manamela, ANC since 12 July 2024
- Premier: Panyaza Lesufi, ANC since 6 October 2022

Structure
- Seats: 80
- Political groups: Government (43): ANC (28); EFF (11); PA (2); IFP (1); RISE (1); Opposition (22): DA (22); Other parties (15): MK (8); ActionSA (3); FF+ (2); ACDP (1); BOSA (1)

Elections
- Voting system: Party-list proportional representation
- Last election: 29 May 2024

Meeting place
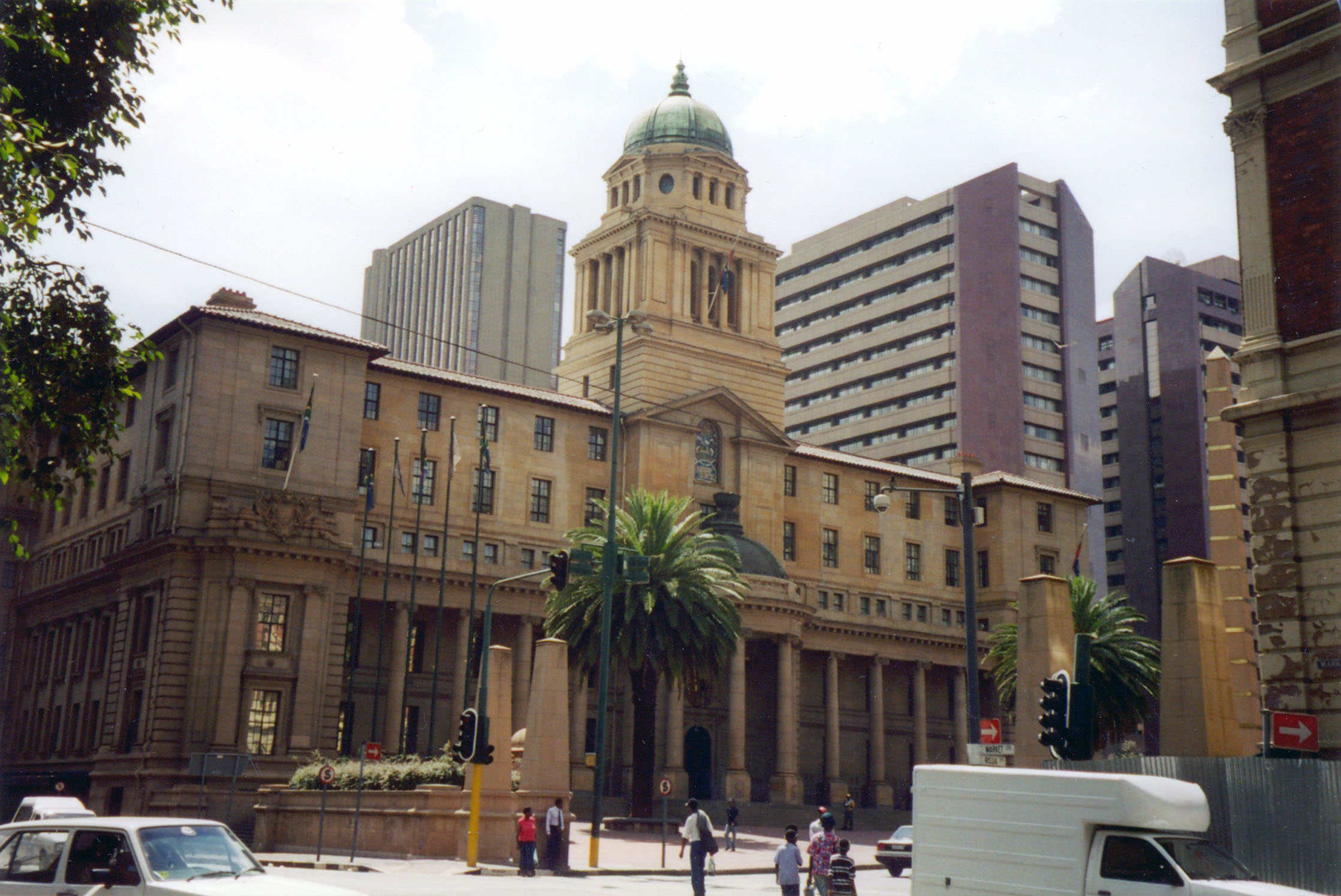
- Johannesburg City Hall, City Hall Street, Johannesburg

Website
- www.gpl.gov.za

The Gauteng Provincial Legislature is the legislature of the South African province of Gauteng. It is a unicameral body of 80 members elected every five years. The current legislature, the seventh, was elected on 29 May 2024 and is a hung parliament with no overall majority for any party, with the African National Congress having lost its previous majority, but remaining the largest party with 28 members. The legislature is housed in Johannesburg City Hall in central Johannesburg.

The Gauteng Provincial Legislature, like the eight other provincial legislatures in South Africa, was created on 27 April 1994 by the Interim Constitution of South Africa, which dissolved the four original provinces (and their provincial councils) and created the nine current provinces. It is currently constituted in terms of Chapter Six of the Constitution of South Africa, which defines the structure of the provincial governments. In February 2024, the number of allocated seats in the legislature was increased to 80 seats, the maximum number of seats allowed.

== Powers ==
The Gauteng Provincial Legislature elects the Premier of Gauteng, the head of Gauteng's provincial executive. The legislature can force the Premier to resign by passing a motion of no confidence. Although the Executive Council is selected by the Premier, the legislature may pass a motion of no confidence to compel the Premier to reshuffle the council. The legislature also appoints Gauteng's delegates to the National Council of Provinces, allocating delegates to parties in proportion to the number of seats each party holds in the legislature.

The legislature has the power to pass legislation in various fields specified in the national constitution; in some fields, the legislative power is shared with the national parliament, while in other fields it is reserved to the province alone. The fields include matters such as health, education (except universities), agriculture, housing, environmental protection, and development planning.

The legislature oversees the administration of the Gauteng provincial government, and the Gauteng Premier and the members of the Executive Council are required to report to the legislature on the performance of their responsibilities. The legislature also manages the financial affairs of the provincial government by way of the appropriation bills which determine the annual provincial budget.

== Election ==
The provincial legislature consists of 80 members, who are elected through a system of party list proportional representation with closed lists. In other words, each voter casts a vote for one political party, and seats in the legislature are allocated to the parties in proportion to the number of votes received. The seats are then filled by members in accordance with lists submitted by the parties before the election.

The legislature is elected for a term of five years, unless it is dissolved early. This may occur if the legislature votes to dissolve and it is at least three years since the last election, or if the Premiership falls vacant and the legislature fails to elect a new Premier within ninety days. By convention all nine provincial legislatures and the National Assembly are elected on the same day.

The most recent election was held on 29 May 2024. The following table summarises the results:

Party	Votes	Vote %	Seats
ANC	1,367,248	34.76	28
DA	1,079,229	27.44	22
EFF	508,390	12.93	11
MK	384,968	9.79	8
ActionSA	163,541	4.16	3
VF+	91,521	2.33	2
PA	79,964	2.03	2
RISE	38,496	0.98	1
IFP	34,250	0.87	1
BOSA	29,978	0.76	1
ACDP	29,163	0.74	1
Other parties	126,499	3.21	0
Total	3,933,247	100	80

The following table shows the composition of the provincial parliament after past elections and floor-crossing periods.

Event	ACDP	ANC	ASA	BOSA	COPE	DP/DA	EFF	FF/FF+	ID	IFP	MK	NP/NNP	PAC	RISE	UDM	Others
1994 election	1	50	—	—	—	5	—	5	—	3	—	21	1	—	—	0
1999 election	1	50	—	—	—	13	—	1	—	3	—	3	0	—	1	1
2003 floor-crossing	1	50	—	—	—	12	—	0	1	3	—	3	0	—	1	2
2004 election	1	51	—	—	—	15	—	1	1	2	—	0	1	—	1	0
2005 floor-crossing	1	51	—	—	—	12	—	1	1	2	—	—	1	—	0	4
2007 floor-crossing	1	51	—	—	—	13	—	2	2	2	—	—	0	—	0	2
2009 election	1	47	—	—	6	16	—	1	1	1	—	—	0	—	0	0
2014 election	0	40	—	—	0	23	8	1	—	1	—	—	0	—	0	0
2019 election	1	37	—	—	0	20	11	3	—	1	—	—	0	—	0	0
2024 election	1	28	3	1	0	22	11	2	—	1	8	—	0	1	0	0

== Officers ==
The Speaker is the political head of the legislature, and is assisted by a Deputy Speaker. The Speaker, Marakane Mosupyoe of the African National Congress, was elected on 14 June 2024. The following people have served as Speaker:

Name	Entered office	Left office	Party
Trevor Fowler	1994	1999	ANC
Firoz Cachalia	1999	2004	ANC
Richard Mdakane	2004	2009	ANC
Lindiwe Maseko	2009	2014	ANC
Ntombi Lentheng Mekgwe	2014	2024	ANC
Morakane Mosupyoe	2024	Incumbent	ANC

== Members ==
- List of members of the 2nd Gauteng Provincial Legislature (1999–2004)
- List of members of the 3rd Gauteng Provincial Legislature (2004–2009)
- List of members of the 4th Gauteng Provincial Legislature (2009–2014)
- List of members of the 5th Gauteng Provincial Legislature (2014–2019)
- List of members of the 6th Gauteng Provincial Legislature (2019–2024)
