= Gauteng (National Assembly of South Africa constituency) =

- eGoli iRhawuti
- Constituency for the National Assembly of South Africa
- Location of Gauteng within South Africa
- Province: Gauteng
- Population: 15,488,137 (2020)
- Electorate: 6,381,220 (2019)

Current constituency
- Created: 1994
- Seats: List: 48 (2014–present); 47 (2009–2014); 45 (2004–2009); 46 (–2004)
- Members of the National Assembly: List: Darren Bergman (DA); Glynnis Breytenbach (DA); Cilliers Brink (DA); Ghaleb Cachalia (DA); Naledi Chirwa (EFF); Michéle Clarke (DA); Mathew Cuthbert (DA); Manuel de Freitas (DA); Janho Engelbrecht (DA); Annah Gela (ANC); Melina Gomba (ANC); Mondli Gungubele (ANC); Madeleine Hicklin (DA); Ntokozo Hlonyana (EFF); Jacques Julius (DA); Gerhard Koornhof (ANC); Walter Tebogo Letsie (ANC); James Lorimer (DA); Peace Mabe (ANC); Dorothy Mabiletsa (ANC); Cameron Mackenzie (DA); Ringo Madlingozi (EFF); Isaac Mafanya (EFF); Thlologelo Malatji (ANC); Jane Mananiso (ANC); Boyce Maneli (ANC); Lisa Mangcu (ANC); Bridget Masango (DA); Nomathemba Maseko-Jele (ANC); Mfana Mashego (ANC); Oscar Mathafa (ANC); Simphiwe Mbatha (ANC); Teliswa Mgweba (ANC); Tsepo Mhlongo (DA); Nompendulo Mkhatshwa (ANC); Hlengiwe Mkhize (ANC); Moleboheng Modise (ANC); Phillip Matsapole Pogiso Modise (ANC); Anastasia Motaung (ANC); Pebane Moteka (EFF); Angie Motshekga (ANC); Mathole Motshekga (ANC); Luyolo Mphithi (DA); Thembi Msane (EFF); Jaco Mulder (VF+); Tshilidzi Munyai (ANC); Delisile Ngwenya (EFF); Duma Nkosi (ANC); Nontando Nolutshungu (EFF); Thulas Nxesi (ANC); Anthony Hope Mankwana Papo (ANC); Chana Pilane-Majake (ANC); Adrian Roos (DA); Ashor Sarupen (DA); Nazley Sharif (DA); Patrick Sindane (EFF); Petros Sithole (IFP); Primrose Sonti (EFF); Bernice Swarts (ANC); Sophie Thembekwayo (EFF); Maggie Tlou (ANC); Alfred Tseki (ANC); Judith Tshabalala (ANC); Mgcini Tshwaku (EFF); Philip van Staden (VF+); Thomas Walters (DA); Phindisile Xaba-Ntshaba (ANC); Bafuze Yabo (ANC); Yoliswa Yako (EFF); Lindiwe Zulu (ANC)

Gauteng (Zulu: eGoli; Xhosa: iRhawuti) is one of the nine multi-member constituencies of the National Assembly of South Africa, the lower house of the Parliament of South Africa, the national legislature of South Africa. The constituency was established as Pretoria–Witwatersrand–Vereeniging in 1994 when the National Assembly was established by the Interim Constitution following the end of Apartheid. It was renamed Gauteng in 1999. It is conterminous with the province of Gauteng. The constituency currently elects 48 of the 400 members of the National Assembly using the closed party-list proportional representation electoral system. At the 2019 general election it had 6,381,220 registered electors.

== Electoral system ==
Gauteng currently elects 48 of the 400 members of the National Assembly using the closed party-list proportional representation electoral system. Constituency seats are allocated using the largest remainder method with a Droop quota.

== Election results ==
=== Summary ===
Election	Pan Africanist Congress PAC			United Democratic Movement UDM			African National Congress ANC			Democratic Alliance DA/DP			New National Party NNP/NP			African Christian Democratic Party ACDP			Inkatha Freedom Party IFP			Economic Freedom Fighters EFF			Freedom Front Plus VF+/VFFF/VV-FF		
Election	Votes	%	Seats	Votes	%	Seats	Votes	%	Seats	Votes	%	Seats	Votes	%	Seats	Votes	%	Seats	Votes	%	Seats	Votes	%	Seats	Votes	%	Seats
2024	13,013	0.33%	0	7,831	0.20%	0	1,359,382	34.55%	17	1,071,879	27.24%	13				29,409	0.75%	0	36,142	0.92%	1	508,484	12.92%	6	97,293	2.47%	1
2019	10,842	0.24%	0	13,160	0.29%	0	2,413,979	53.20%	26	1,112,990	24.53%	12				36,249	0.80%	0	45,840	1.01%	1	613,704	13.53%	7	175,152	3.86%	2
2014	11,077	0.24%	0	25,541	0.56%	0	2,522,012	54.92%	27	1,309,862	28.52%	14				30,761	0.67%	0	37,785	0.82%	1	471,074	10.26%	5	58,122	1.27%	1
2009	12,671	0.29%	0	17,335	0.40%	0	2,814,277	64.76%	31	924,211	21.27%	10				38,738	0.89%	0	64,166	1.48%	1				59,803	1.38%	1
2004	28,524	0.81%	0	35,499	1.01%	0	2,408,821	68.74%	32	712,395	20.33%	9	25,842	0.74%	0	56,520	1.61%	1	92,556	2.64%	1				42,000	1.20%	1
1999	25,395	0.69%	0	79,565	2.15%	1	2,524,050	68.14%	32	655,879	17.71%	8	142,738	3.85%	2	43,321	1.17%	1	131,200	3.54%	2				40,781	1.10%	0
1994	52,557	1.25%					2,486,938	59.10%		126,368	3.00%		1,160,593	27.58%		20,329	0.48%		173,903	4.13%					154,878	3.68%	

=== Detailed ===
==== 2024 ====
Results of the regional ballot for Gauteng in the 2024 general election held on 29 May 2024:

Party/Candidate	Votes	%	Seats	+/–
African National Congress	1,359,382	34.55	17	–9
Democratic Alliance	1,071,879	27.24	13	+1
Economic Freedom Fighters	508,484	12.92	6	–1
uMkhonto weSizwe	384,483	9.77	5	New
ActionSA	159,614	4.06	2	New
Freedom Front Plus	97,293	2.47	1	–1
Patriotic Alliance	83,804	2.13	1	+1
Rise Mzansi	40,322	1.02	1	New
Inkatha Freedom Party	36,142	0.92	1	0
Build One South Africa	34,829	0.89	0	New
African Christian Democratic Party	29,409	0.75	0	0
Al Jama-ah	17,045	0.43	0	0
Pan Africanist Congress of Azania	13,013	0.33	0	0
African Transformation Movement	11,697	0.30	0	0
#Hope4SA	8,955	0.23	0	New
United Africans Transformation	8,932	0.23	0	New
United Democratic Movement	7,831	0.20	0	0
United Independent Movement	6,231	0.16	0	New
Good	5,780	0.15	0	0
Azanian People's Organisation	4,644	0.12	0	0
Allied Movement for Change	4,524	0.11	0	New
African Independent Congress	3,843	0.10	0	0
Anele Mda (independent)	3,724	0.09	0	New
Congress of the People	3,601	0.09	0	0
African Heart Congress	3,594	0.09	0	New
South African Rainbow Alliance	2,790	0.07	0	New
African People's Convention	2,578	0.07	0	0
South African Royal Kingdoms Organization	2,149	0.05	0	New
Economic Liberators Forum South Africa	1,823	0.05	0	New
Organic Humanity Movement	1,777	0.05	0	New
Alliance of Citizens for Change	1,512	0.04	0	New
National Freedom Party	1,410	0.04	0	0
Africa Restoration Alliance	1,335	0.03	0	New
Xiluva	1,172	0.03	0	New
Conservatives in Action	1,124	0.03	0	New
Louis Liebenberg (independent)	1,115	0.03	0	New
Blessings Ramoba (independent)	1,108	0.03	0	New
Sizwe Ummah Nation	1,072	0.03	0	New
Africa Africans Reclaim	1,041	0.03	0	New
All Citizens Party	961	0.02	0	New
Citizans	808	0.02	0	New
Able Leadership	727	0.02	0	New
People's Movement for Change	602	0.02	0	New
Free Democrats	489	0.01	0	0
Total	3,934,648	100.00	47	–1
Valid votes	3,934,648	99.20		
Invalid/blank votes	31,824	0.80		
Total votes	3,966,472	100.00		
Registered voters/turnout	6,541,978	60.63		

The following candidates were elected.

Name	Party
Zelna Abader	MK
Wendy Alexander	DA
Toby Chance	DA
Andrew de Blocq	DA
Janho Engelbrecht	DA
Makashule Gana	RISE
Nonceba Gcaleka-Mazibuko	ANC
Sixolisa Gcilishe	EFF
Ntokozo Hlonyana	EFF
Haseenabanu Ismail	DA
Liam Jacobs	DA
Dereleen James	ActionSA
Tebogo Letsie	ANC
Peace Mabe	ANC
Thamsanqa Mabhena	DA
Sello Maeco	ANC
Mokgaetji Mafagane	MK
Thokozile Magagula	ANC
Cristopher Nakampe Malematja	ANC
Boyce Maneli	ANC
Mzwanele Manyi	EFF
Sydwell Masilela	MK
Mzwandile Masina	ANC
Oscar Mathafa	ANC
Inathi Mbiyo	ANC
Teliswa Mgweba	ANC
Moleboheng Modise	ANC
Thapelo Mogale	EFF
Stephen Moore	DA
Angie Motshekga	ANC
Luyolo Mphithi	DA
Mariam Muhammad	MK
Tshilidzi Munyai	ANC
Judith Nemadzinga-Tshabalala	ANC
Lerato Ngobeni	ActionSA
Carl Niehaus	EFF
Wildri Peach	DA
Jasmine Petersen	PA
Leah Potgieter	DA
Anthea Ramolobeng	ANC
Tumelo Ramongalo	DA
Crossby Shongwe	MK
Petros Sithole	IFP
Sophie Thembekwayo	EFF
Philip van Staden	VF+
Kingsley Wakelin	DA
Pretty Xaba-Ntshaba	ANC

==== 2019 ====
Results of the national ballot for Gauteng in the 2019 general election held on 8 May 2019:

Party	Votes	%	Seats	+/–
African National Congress	2,413,979	53.20	26	–1
Democratic Alliance	1,112,990	24.53	12	–2
Economic Freedom Fighters	613,704	13.53	7	+2
Freedom Front Plus	175,152	3.86	2	+1
Inkatha Freedom Party	45,840	1.01	1	0
African Christian Democratic Party	36,249	0.80	0	0
United Democratic Movement	13,160	0.29	0	0
Congress of the People	12,358	0.27	0	0
Pan Africanist Congress of Azania	10,842	0.24	0	0
Good	9,983	0.22	0	New
African Transformation Movement	9,948	0.22	0	New
African Independent Congress	9,715	0.21	0	0
Capitalist Party of South Africa	7,515	0.17	0	New
Al Jama-ah	7,064	0.16	0	0
Black First Land First	7,009	0.15	0	New
Socialist Revolutionary Workers Party	5,903	0.13	0	New
African Security Congress	4,225	0.09	0	New
Azanian People's Organisation	3,842	0.08	0	0
National Freedom Party	3,568	0.08	0	0
African People's Convention	3,136	0.07	0	0
African Covenant	2,782	0.06	0	New
Front National	2,737	0.06	0	0
Agang South Africa	2,579	0.06	0	0
Afrikan Alliance of Social Democrats	2,486	0.05	0	New
Women Forward	2,247	0.05	0	0
Economic Emancipation Forum	1,398	0.03	0	New
Alliance for Transformation for All	1,345	0.03	0	New
Christian Political Movement	1,248	0.03	0	New
Patriotic Alliance	1,206	0.03	0	0
Independent Civic Organisation of South Africa	1,191	0.03	0	0
African Content Movement	1,174	0.03	0	New
Minority Front	1,154	0.03	0	0
National People's Front	1,091	0.02	0	New
African Democratic Change	992	0.02	0	New
African Congress of Democrats	918	0.02	0	New
African Renaissance Unity Party	900	0.02	0	New
Democratic Liberal Congress	854	0.02	0	New
Free Democrats	781	0.02	0	New
Forum for Service Delivery	729	0.02	0	New
International Revelation Congress	684	0.02	0	New
Better Residents Association	565	0.01	0	0
Land Party	452	0.01	0	New
Power of Africans Unity	429	0.01	0	New
South African National Congress of Traditional Authorities	419	0.01	0	New
Compatriots of South Africa	361	0.01	0	New
National People's Ambassadors	197	0.00	0	New
People's Revolutionary Movement	163	0.00	0	New
South African Maintenance and Estate Beneficiaries Association	138	0.00	0	New
Total	4,537,402	100.00	48	–
Valid votes	4,537,402	99.06		
Invalid/blank votes	42,883	0.94		
Total votes	4,580,285	100.00		
Registered voters/turnout	6,381,220	71.78		

The following candidates were elected: Heinrich April (ANC), Darren Bergman (DA), Ghaleb Cachalia (DA), Michéle Clarke (DA), Mathew Cuthbert (DA), Evert du Plessis (DA), Annah Gela (ANC), Melina Gomba (ANC), Madeleine Hicklin (DA), Gerhard Koornhof (ANC), Tebogo Letsie (ANC), James Lorimer (DA), Peace Mabe (ANC), Dorothy Mabiletsa (ANC), Cameron Mackenzie (DA), Thlologelo Malatji (ANC), Boyce Maneli (ANC), Lisa Mangcu (ANC), Bridget Masango (DA), Nomathemba Maseko-Jele (ANC), Robert Mashego (ANC), Oscar Mathafa (ANC), Simphiwe Mbatha (ANC), Teliswa Mgweba (ANC), Jacqueline Mofokeng (ANC), Stevens Mokgalapa (DA), Anastasia Motaung (ANC), Pebane Moteka (EFF), Jaco Mulder (VF+), Tshilidzi Munyai (ANC), Duma Nkosi (ANC), Nontando Nolutshungu (EFF), Hope Papo (ANC), Chana Pilane-Majake (ANC), Nazley Sharif (DA), Patrick Sindane (EFF), Petros Sithole (IFP), Primrose Sonti (EFF), Bernice Swarts (ANC), Sophie Thembekwayo (EFF), Maggie Tlou (ANC), Alfred Tseki (ANC), Judith Tshabalala (ANC), Mgcini Tshwaku (EFF), Belinda van Onselen (DA), Philip van Staden (VF+), Bafuze Yabo (ANC) and Yoliswa Yako (EFF).

==== 2014 ====
Results of the 2014 general election held on 7 May 2014:

Party		Votes	%	Seats
African National Congress	ANC	2,522,012	54.92%	27
Democratic Alliance	DA	1,309,862	28.52%	14
Economic Freedom Fighters	EFF	471,074	10.26%	5
Freedom Front Plus	VF+	58,122	1.27%	1
Inkatha Freedom Party	IFP	37,785	0.82%	1
African Christian Democratic Party	ACDP	30,761	0.67%	0
United Democratic Movement	UDM	25,541	0.56%	0
Congress of the People	COPE	23,203	0.51%	0
Agang South Africa	AGANG SA	22,404	0.49%	0
National Freedom Party	NFP	22,403	0.49%	0
African Independent Congress	AIC	19,943	0.43%	0
Pan Africanist Congress of Azania	PAC	11,077	0.24%	0
Al Jama-ah		7,509	0.16%	0
African People's Convention	APC	5,844	0.13%	0
Azanian People's Organisation	AZAPO	5,277	0.11%	0
United Christian Democratic Party	UCDP	3,623	0.08%	0
Ubuntu Party	UBUNTU	2,923	0.06%	0
Minority Front	MF	2,144	0.05%	0
Workers and Socialist Party	WASP	1,825	0.04%	0
Front National	FN	1,728	0.04%	0
Patriotic Alliance	PA	1,482	0.03%	0
Keep It Straight and Simple Party	KISS	1,184	0.03%	0
Bushbuckridge Residents Association	BRA	1,043	0.02%	0
First Nation Liberation Alliance	FINLA	808	0.02%	0
Kingdom Governance Movement	KGM	699	0.02%	0
Pan Africanist Movement	PAM	681	0.01%	0
Independent Civic Organisation of South Africa	ICOSA	669	0.01%	0
Peoples Alliance	PAL	330	0.01%	0
United Congress	UNICO	263	0.01%	0
Valid Votes		4,592,219	100.00%	48
Rejected Votes		46,762	1.01%	
Total Polled		4,638,981	76.50%	
Registered Electors		6,063,739		

The following candidates were elected: Patrick Atkinson (DA), Khumbuza Bavu (EFF), Roger William Tobias Chance (DA), Mamonare Patricia Chueu (ANC), Manuel de Freitas (DA), Joan Fubbs (ANC), Charles Danny Kekana (ANC), Ezekiel Kekana (ANC), Maesela David Kekana (ANC), Gerhard Koornhof (ANC), Mmamoloko Kubayi (ANC), Khanyisile Litchfield-Tshabalala (EFF), Xitlhangoma Mabasa (ANC), Peace Mabe (ANC), Gordon Mackay (DA), Patrick Maesela (ANC), Gratitude Magwanishe (ANC), Mmusi Maimane (DA), Lindiwe Maseko (ANC), Paul Mashatile (ANC), Amos Masondo (ANC), Alan Ross McLoughlin (DA), Richard Mdakane (ANC), Mmeli Julius Mdluli (EFF), Tsepo Mhlongo (DA), Velhelmina Pulani Mogotsi (ANC), Angie Molebatsi (ANC), Rebecca Getrude Mmamokgolo Monchusi (EFF), Storey Morutoa (ANC), Sej Motau (DA), Kenneth Mubu (DA), Jaco Mulder (VF+), Claudia Ndaba (ANC), Chana Pilane-Majake (ANC), Strike Michael Ralegoma (ANC), Deborah Dineo Raphuti (ANC), Marius Redelinghuys (DA), Hendrick Schmidt (DA), Petros Sithole (IFP), Vincent Smith (ANC), Elizabeth Thabethe (ANC), Sello Albert Tleane (ANC), Dikeledi Tsotetsi (ANC), Diliza Lucky Twala (EFF), Belinda van Onselen (DA), Des van Rooyen (ANC), Heinrich Cyril Volmink (DA) and Mike Waters (DA).

==== 2009 ====
Results of the 2009 general election held on 22 April 2009:

Party		Votes	%	Seats
African National Congress	ANC	2,814,277	64.76%	31
Democratic Alliance	DA	924,211	21.27%	10
Congress of the People	COPE	337,931	7.78%	4
Inkatha Freedom Party	IFP	64,166	1.48%	1
Freedom Front Plus	VF+	59,803	1.38%	1
African Christian Democratic Party	ACDP	38,738	0.89%	0
Independent Democrats	ID	25,023	0.58%	0
United Democratic Movement	UDM	17,335	0.40%	0
Pan Africanist Congress of Azania	PAC	12,671	0.29%	0
Azanian People's Organisation	AZAPO	9,037	0.21%	0
United Christian Democratic Party	UCDP	8,322	0.19%	0
African People's Convention	APC	6,461	0.15%	0
Al Jama-ah		6,392	0.15%	0
Movement Democratic Party	MDP	5,777	0.13%	0
Christian Democratic Alliance	CDA	2,788	0.06%	0
Minority Front	MF	2,260	0.05%	0
Women Forward	WF	1,448	0.03%	0
National Democratic Convention	NADECO	1,426	0.03%	0
Great Kongress of South Africa	GKSA	1,384	0.03%	0
Pan Africanist Movement	PAM	1,357	0.03%	0
New Vision Party	NVP	1,076	0.02%	0
Keep It Straight and Simple Party	KISS	882	0.02%	0
Alliance of Free Democrats	AFD	871	0.02%	0
United Independent Front	UIF	846	0.02%	0
South African Democratic Congress	SADECO	676	0.02%	0
A Party		455	0.01%	0
Valid Votes		4,345,613	100.00%	47
Rejected Votes		46,086	1.05%	
Total Polled		4,391,699	79.06%	
Registered Electors		5,555,159		

The following candidates were elected: Obed Bapela (ANC), Loretta Bastardo-Ibanez (ANC), George Boinamo (DA), Fatima Chohan (ANC), Ian Davidson (DA), Bonginkosi Dhlamini (IFP), Anchen Dreyer (DA), Manuel de Freitas (DA), Joan Fubbs (ANC), Dion George (DA), Mondli Gungubele (ANC), Bertha Gxowa (ANC), Charles Danny Kekana (ANC), Julie Kilian (COPE), Junita Kloppers-Lourens (DA), Gerhard Koornhof (ANC), James Lorimer (DA), Xitlhangoma Mabaso (ANC), Nomopo Maggie Madlala (ANC), Mavis Magazi (ANC), Gratitude Magwanishe (ANC), Holmes Peter Maluleka (ANC), Frans Ting-Ting Masango (ANC), Maggie Maunye (ANC), Richard Mdakane (ANC), Natasha Michael (DA), Emmanuel Musawenkosi Mlambo (ANC), Andrew Mlangeni (ANC), Poppy Audrey Mocumi (ANC), Stevens Mokgalapa (DA), Oupa Monareng (ANC), Emmah More (DA), Storey Morutoa (ANC), Sej Motau (DA), Kenneth Mubu (DA), Winnie Ngwenya (ANC), Phumelele Ntshiqela (COPE), Doreen Nxumalo (ANC), Eric Nyekemba (ANC), Ian Ollis (DA), Hendrick Schmidt (DA), Greg Schneemann (ANC), Elliot Mshiyeni Sogoni (ANC), Willie Durand Spies (VF+), Butch Steyn (DA), Elizabeth Thabethe (ANC), Siphiwe Isaac Thusi (COPE), Dikeledi Tsotetsi (ANC), Ismail Vadi (ANC), Niekie van den Berg (DA), Manie van Dyk (DA), Ayanda Vanqa (ANC), Nolitha Yvonne Vukuza-Linda (COPE), Phindisile Pretty Xaba (ANC), Mike Waters (DA) and Marta Wenger (DA).

==== 2004 ====
Results of the 2004 general election held on 14 April 2004:

Party		Votes	%	Seats
African National Congress	ANC	2,408,821	68.74%	32
Democratic Alliance	DA	712,395	20.33%	9
Inkatha Freedom Party	IFP	92,556	2.64%	1
Independent Democrats	ID	60,501	1.73%	1
African Christian Democratic Party	ACDP	56,520	1.61%	1
Freedom Front Plus	VF+	42,000	1.20%	1
United Democratic Movement	UDM	35,499	1.01%	0
Pan Africanist Congress of Azania	PAC	28,524	0.81%	0
New National Party	NNP	25,842	0.74%	0
United Christian Democratic Party	UCDP	8,964	0.26%	0
Azanian People's Organisation	AZAPO	7,930	0.23%	0
Christian Democratic Party	CDP	5,633	0.16%	0
National Action	NA	4,153	0.12%	0
United Front	UF	3,855	0.11%	0
Peace and Justice Congress	PJC	3,100	0.09%	0
Socialist Party of Azania	SOPA	2,534	0.07%	0
Minority Front	MF	1,692	0.05%	0
The Organisation Party	TOP	1,186	0.03%	0
Keep It Straight and Simple Party	KISS	1,154	0.03%	0
Employment Movement for South Africa	EMSA	1,029	0.03%	0
New Labour Party		475	0.01%	0
Valid Votes		3,504,363	100.00%	45
Rejected Votes		48,735	1.37%	
Total Polled		3,553,098	76.40%	
Registered Electors		4,650,594		

The following candidates were elected: Obed Bapela (ANC), Loretta Bastardo-Ibanez (ANC), Hendrietta Bogopane-Zulu (ANC), Ismail Mahomed Cachalia (ANC), Ian Davidson (DA), Bonginkosi Dhlamini (IFP), Joan Fubbs (ANC), Douglas Gibson (DA), Bertha Gxowa (ANC), Fatima Hajaig (ANC), Barbara Hogan (ANC), Dorothy Hounkpatin (ANC), Charles Danny Kekana (ANC), Joyce Kgoali (ANC), Leslie Bernardus Labuschagne (DA), Kgaogelo Lekgoro (ANC), Tony Leon (DA), Mavis Magazi (ANC), Dan Maluleke (DA), Holmes Peter Maluleka (ANC), Maggie Maunye (ANC), Lefokane Lydia Meshoe (ACDP), Andrew Mlangeni (ANC), Aubrey Mokoena (ANC), Jabu Moleketi (ANC), Oupa Monareng (ANC), Storey Morutoa (ANC), Jaco Mulder (VF+), Andries Nel (ANC), Doris Ngcengwane (ANC), Sisa James Njikelana (ANC), Richard Ntuli (DA), Doreen Nxumalo (ANC), Dorothy Mapula Ramodibe (ANC), Greg Schneemann (ANC), Janet Semple (DA), Dumisani Sithole (ANC), Vincent Smith (ANC), Themba Joseph Sono (ID), Raenette Taljaard (DA), Elizabeth Thabethe (ANC), Ismail Vadi (ANC), Manie van Dyk (DA), Lulama Xingwana (ANC) and Langa Zita (ANC).

==== 1999 ====
Results of the 1999 general election held on 2 June 1999:

Party		Votes	%	Seats
African National Congress	ANC	2,524,050	68.14%	32
Democratic Party	DP	655,879	17.71%	8
New National Party	NNP	142,738	3.85%	2
Inkatha Freedom Party	IFP	131,200	3.54%	2
United Democratic Movement	UDM	79,565	2.15%	1
African Christian Democratic Party	ACDP	43,321	1.17%	1
Freedom Front	VFFF	40,781	1.10%	0
Federal Alliance	FA	31,385	0.85%	0
Pan Africanist Congress of Azania	PAC	25,395	0.69%	0
Afrikaner Eenheidsbeweging	AEB	10,918	0.29%	0
United Christian Democratic Party	UCDP	7,618	0.21%	0
Azanian People's Organisation	AZAPO	5,290	0.14%	0
Government by the People Green Party	GPGP	2,179	0.06%	0
Socialist Party of Azania	SOPA	1,715	0.05%	0
Minority Front	MF	1,271	0.03%	0
Abolition of Income Tax and Usury Party	AITUP	1,144	0.03%	0
Valid Votes		3,704,449	100.00%	46
Rejected Votes		40,509	1.08%	
Total Polled		3,744,958	90.15%	
Registered Electors		4,154,087		

==== 1994 ====
Results of the national ballot for Gauteng in the 1994 general election held between 26 and 29 April 1994:

Party	Votes	%	Seats
African National Congress	2,486,938	59.10	26
National Party	1,160,593	27.58	12
Inkatha Freedom Party	173,903	4.13	2
Freedom Front	154,878	3.68	2
Democratic Party	126,368	3.00	1
Pan Africanist Congress of Azania	52,557	1.25	0
African Christian Democratic Party	20,329	0.48	0
Africa Muslim Party	7,413	0.18	0
Federal Party	6,844	0.16	0
African Moderates Congress Party	5,635	0.13	0
Sport Organisation for Collective Contributions and Equal Rights	2,953	0.07	0
Dikwankwetla Party of South Africa	2,424	0.06	0
Women's Rights Peace Party	1,850	0.04	0
Minority Front	1,575	0.04	0
Keep It Straight and Simple Party	1,107	0.03	0
African Democratic Movement	1,062	0.03	0
Ximoko Progressive Party	828	0.02	0
Workers' List Party	554	0.01	0
Luso-South African Party	490	0.01	0
Total	4,208,301	100.00	43
Valid votes	4,208,301	99.30	
Invalid/blank votes	29,632	0.70	
Total votes	4,237,933	100.00	
