= Portfolio Committee on Tourism =

Portfolio committee in the National Assembly of South Africa

The Portfolio Committee on Tourism is a portfolio committee in the National Assembly of South Africa. The committee scrutinises the work of the Department of Tourism and South African Tourism.

Since September 2021, Tandi Mahambehlala of the African National Congress has served as Chair of the Committee.

== Membership ==
The committee consists of 11 members: six from the African National Congress, two from the Democratic Alliance, one from the Economic Freedom Fighters and two members from other parties. As of December 2020, the committee's current members are as follows:

Member	Party
Tandi Mahambehlala MP (Chairperson)	African National Congress
Manuel de Freitas MP	Democratic Alliance
Mandla Galo MP	African Independent Congress
Hlanganani Gumbi MP	Democratic Alliance
Thanduxolo Khalipha MP	African National Congress
Lusizo Makhubela-Mashele MP	African National Congress
Pebane Moteka MP	Economic Freedom Fighters
Phumeza Mpushe MP	African National Congress
Petros Sithole MP	Inkatha Freedom Party
Sheilla Xego MP	African National Congress

The following people serve as alternate members:

Alternate Member	Party
Heinrich April MP	African National Congress
Michal Groenewald MP	Freedom Front Plus
Hannah Winkler MP	Democratic Alliance

== See also ==
- Committees of the Parliament of South Africa
