= Joan Fubbs =

South African retired politician, educator and poet

Chairperson of the Portfolio Committee on Trade and Industry
- In office 27 May 2009 – 7 May 2019
- Preceded by: Ben Martins
- Succeeded by: Duma Nkosi

Member of the National Assembly of South Africa
- In office 23 April 2004 – 7 May 2019

Member of the Gauteng Provincial Legislature
- In office 7 May 1994 – 13 April 2004

Personal details
- Born: 30 November 1944 (age 81)
- Party: African National Congress
- Spouse: John Leslie Fubbs
- Children: 4
- Education: University of South Africa (BA Hons); University of the Witwatersrand (MSc); SOAS University of London (PGDip, MSc)
- Profession: Politician; educator; poet

Joanmariae Louise Fubbs (born 30 November 1944) is a South African retired politician, educator and poet. A member of the governing African National Congress, she was a Member of the Gauteng Provincial Legislature from 1994 until 2004 when she was elected to the National Assembly of South Africa. Following her re-election in 2009, she was elected chairperson of the Portfolio Committee on Trade and Industry, a position she would hold until she left Parliament at the 2019 general election.

== Early life and education ==
Fubbs was born on 30 November 1944. She became an activist during her student days. She graduated Bachelor of Arts in Political Science and Psychology from the University of South Africa in 1980 followed by earning a BA Honours degree in Clinical Psychology in 1990 and next a Master of Science degree in Development and Planning from the University of the Witwatersrand in 1993. From the SOAS University of London, Fubbs obtained a Postgraduate Diploma in Economic Principles in 2000 and lastly graduated as a Master of Science in Public Policy and Management in 2013.

== Teaching career ==
Fubbs had previously taught at St Benedict's College, a private English-medium high school for boys in Bedfordview. While an educator there, the school welcomed eight Black learners from Soweto during the anti-apartheid riots in the 1970s whom Fubbs allowed to stay at her home.

== Political career ==
Fubbs is a founder and the chairperson of the non-profit Centre for Education in Economics and Finance Africa. A member of the African National Congress, she was elected as a member of the newly established Gauteng Provincial Legislature in the 1994 general election. During her time in the legislature, she chaired the Standing Committee on Finance as well as the Economic Affairs committee when it became its own separate committee in 2001. She was also a member of the Standing Committee on Public Accounts, the deputy chairperson of the Internal Audit committee of the legislature and the chairperson of the Premier's Oversight Committee.

== Parliamentary career ==
Fubbs was elected an ANC member of the National Assembly in 2004. During her first term, she served as whip of the Joint Budget Committee which later became the Standing Committee on Appropriations, and she was a member of the finance portfolio committee. Fubbs chaired the Economic Transformation Cluster.

Following her re-election in the 2009 general election, the ANC selected Fubbs to chair the Portfolio Committee on Trade and Industry. She was elected unopposed on 27 May 2009. In 2012, following a vote in the Portfolio Committee on Trade and Industry that blocked the release of a report by Ferrostaal, a German-owned arms manufacturer, stating that the company had only invested 63 million euros and not the 3 billion euros it was obliged to spend in the controversial Arms Deal. Fubbs stated that the Democratic Alliance members of the committee had every right to call for the release of the report, but she had received legal advice that if the report was released, it would have been in contravention of common law as well as international law.

Fubbs was re-elected as chairperson of the Portfolio Committee on Trade and Industry following the 2014 general election. During her visit to the South African Pavilion at the Havana International Fair (FIHAV) in November 2017, Fubbs said that South Africa had lots of local products that it can trade with Cuba to strengthen trade relations and that Cuba could serve as the country's gateway to Caribbean and South American markets.

Following Jacob Zuma's resignation as President of South Africa on 14 February 2018, the National Assembly met the following day to elect a new president. After Chief Justice Mogoeng Mogoeng announced the call for nominations, newly elected ANC party president, Cyril Ramaphosa, was nominated by backbencher ANC MP Patrick Maesela to be the party's nominee for president in the subsequent parliamentary vote. Fubbs seconded Ramaphosa's nomination, after which Ramaphosa accepted the nomination. Ramaphosa was elected president unopposed due to no opposition party fielding a candidate. During a parliamentary debate later in February, Fubbs attempted to pay tribute to Ramaphosa in Venda, his home language, where he laughed and applauded Fubbs. However, the parliamentary sign language interpreter and social media users could not make out what Fubbs had tried to say.

Fubbs spoke out in favour of the National Credit Amendment Bill in September 2018, saying in a statement: "This bill will strengthen the National Credit Amendment Act which enabled South Africa to withstand the worst effects of the global financial meltdown in 2008."

Fubbs was not on the ANC's electoral list for the 2019 general election and left parliament as a result.

== Post-parliamentary career ==
In November 2020, Fubbs was appointed vice chairperson of the South African Sugar Association following her nomination by the South African Farmers Development Association.

== Poetry ==
Fubbs first wrote poems at the Orapa diamond mine outside Orapa, Botswana. Her first two poems were published by the now-defunct literary magazine Staffrider. She writes poems about her work in Johannesburg, the streets of Cape Town and her family. Her second poetry book, A New Dawn for Humanity, was released in December 2018. Her husband's stroke inspired her to write the Yesterday is lost today is here and What is Love poems.

== Personal life ==
Fubbs is married to John Leslie Fubbs. They have four children and eleven grandchildren together. Fubbs resides in Bedfordview.

A bomb blast in 1994 caused Fubbs to lose sight in her right eye.

== Published works ==
- Fubbs, Joanmariae (December 2017). Humanity's Covenant with Life. Future Managers. ISBN 9781775819523
- Fubbs, Joanmariae (December 2018). A New Dawn for Humanity. Future Managers. ISBN 9780639100005
