= Dikeledi Tsotetsi =

South African politician (born 1956)

Member of the National Assembly
- In office 6 May 2009 – 7 May 2019
- Constituency: Gauteng

Delegate to the National Council of Provinces

Assembly Member for Gauteng
- In office 7 October 2008 – May 2009

Member of the Gauteng Provincial Legislature
- In office June 1999 – March 2006

Personal details
- Born: 3 November 1956 (age 69)
- Citizenship: South Africa
- Party: African National Congress
- Other party: South African Communist Party
- Spouse: Saul Tsotetsi (died 1992)

Dikeledi Rebecca Tsotetsi (born 3 November 1956) is a South African politician from Gauteng. She represented the African National Congress (ANC) in the National Assembly from 2009 to 2019 and was the Mayor of Emfuleni Local Municipality from 2006 to 2008.

Formerly active in the anti-apartheid movement, Tsotetsi began her legislative career as a member of the Gauteng Provincial Legislature from 1999 to 2006. She left her seat in March 2006 when she was elected as Emfuleni Mayor, but, controversially, her own party forced her to resign from that office in May 2008. She subsequently served a brief stint in the National Council of Provinces until she was elected to the National Assembly in 2009. She failed to gain re-election to her seat in the assembly in the 2019 general election.

== Early life and education ==
Dikeledi Tsotetsi was born on 3 November 1956.

She holds a bachelor's in industrial psychology and sociology, an honours in political science, and a master's in development science, all completed after the end of apartheid in 1994.

== Activism ==
In the 1980s, she was active in the anti-apartheid movement, particularly as secretary for the Detainees' Parents' Support Committee. She later served as secretary for the Federation of Transvaal Women and, from 1995, as secretary of a local branch of the ANC Women's League.

She has been a member of the South African Communist Party since 1995.

== Career in government ==
=== Gauteng Legislature: 1999–2006 ===
In the 1999 general election, Tsotetsi was elected for the first time to the Gauteng Provincial Legislature, representing the ANC. She was re-elected to her seat in the 2004 general election and also served as provincial Deputy Chief Whip from 2005 until 2006, when she left the legislature.

=== Mayor of Emfuleni: 2006–2008 ===
Tsotetsi resigned from the provincial legislature in March 2006 in order to stand in that month's local elections as the ANC's mayoral candidate in the embattled Emfuleni Local Municipality in Gauteng's Vaal Triangle. She was sworn in to the office but soon encountered friction with party leaders in the region: in mid-2007, after Tsotetsi fired three members of her mayoral committee, the ANC intervened and forced her to reinstate them. In the aftermath, the Mail & Guardian reported that she called the police after ANC regional chairperson Simon Mofokeng and another individual visited her at her home in order, in her account, to intimidate her.

In May 2008, the ANC instructed Tsotetsi to resign as mayor or face a motion of no confidence from her own party, ostensibly for poor performance. According to the Sowetan, the directive caused "a breakdown in relations" between local ANC branches and higher-level party officials, with many local branches claiming that Tsotetsi (and her municipal manager, who had been suspended) had been targeted because she was conducting an investigation into corruption by ANC officials. At least two-thirds of the 43 local ANC branches in the area passed resolutions disagreeing with the decision to remove Tsotetsi, and fist-fights broke out at some meetings. The opposition Pan Africanist Congress also criticised the decision, although the opposition Democratic Alliance welcomed it. The regional leadership of the ANC said that Tsotetsi would be transferred to another position, although she reported a month later that she was still awaiting further instructions from the party.

=== Parliament ===
On 7 October 2008, Tsotetsi was sworn in to an ANC seat in the Gauteng caucus of the National Council of Provinces, the upper house of the South African Parliament. She filled a casual vacancy arising from the resignation of Sicelo Shiceka, who had been appointed to the cabinet.

In the next general election in 2009, Tsotetsi was elected to an ANC seat in the National Assembly, the lower parliamentary house, where she continued to serve the Gauteng constituency. She served two terms in the seat, gaining re-election in the 2014 general election, and during her second term she served as a party whip in the Portfolio Committee on Telecommunications and Postal Services. In the 2019 general election, she was demoted on the ANC's party list and, ranked 43 on the regional list for Gauteng, she failed to gain re-election.

== Personal life ==
Tsotetsi has two sons and is the widow of Saul Tsotetsi. A lionised figure in the ANC, her husband was a former inmate of Robben Island, a fieldworker for the South African Council of Churches, and a member of the ANC's executive in Evaton in the Vaal Triangle. He died with two comrades in Sebokeng in March 1992: according to police, he was killed when a hand grenade he was holding exploded. The circumstances of his death were unclear and some ANC supporters viewed it as a likely assassination by apartheid security forces.
