= Ghaleb Cachalia =

South African politician (born 1956)

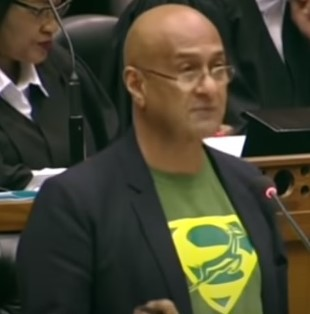

Shadow Minister of Public Enterprises
- In office 31 October 2019 – 2 November 2023
- Deputy: Erik Marais; Michéle Clarke; Farhat Essack
- Leader: John Steenhuisen
- Preceded by: Natasha Mazzone
- Succeeded by: Mimmy Gondwe

Shadow Deputy Minister of Trade and Industry
- In office 1 June 2017 – 5 June 2019
- Leader: Mmusi Maimane
- Shadow Minister: Dean Macpherson
- Preceded by: Dean Macpherson
- Succeeded by: Mathew Cuthbert

Member of the National Assembly of South Africa
- In office 4 May 2017 – 18 January 2024
- Constituency: Gauteng

Leader of the Democratic Alliance Caucus in Ekurhuleni
- In office August 2016 – May 2017
- Succeeded by: Phillip de Lange

Member of the Ekurhuleni City Council
- In office August 2016 – May 2017

Personal details
- Born: 12 November 1956 (age 69) Johannesburg, Gauteng, South Africa
- Party: Independent (2024-present)
- Other political affiliations: Democratic Alliance (2016-2024); African National Congress (until 2016)
- Parents: Yusuf Cachalia (father); Amina Cachalia (mother)
- Education: United World College of the Atlantic; University of London School of Oriental and African Studies; University of the Witwatersrand
- Profession: Politician

Ghaleb Cachalia (born 12 November 1956) is a South African businessman and former Member of Parliament (MP). He is the son of anti-Apartheid activists Amina and Yusuf Cachalia, and a relative of former African National Congress (ANC) MP Ismail Mahomed Cachalia.

== Early life ==
Cachalia was born in Johannesburg in 1956, and grew up in Vrededorp, Fordsburg.

He attended the Waterford School in Eswatini (formerly Swaziland), to avoid the apartheid education system in South Africa. However, his schooling there was interrupted when the South African government threatened him with “passport issues” because of his parents' involvement in anti-Apartheid activism. He was sent abroad to stay with his uncle and aunt in Britain, where he was forced to remain for ten years.

While in the UK, he received a scholarship to study at the United World College of the Atlantic in Wales (1973-5), and then went on to read history at the University of London's School of Oriental and African Studies (1976-9).

He campaigned in the Anti-Apartheid Movement. Upon completion of his studies, he returned to South Africa, and went to the University of the Witwatersrand to study law, a degree which he did not complete. While at the university, he joined the Black Students Society and became its vice-president.

== Business ==
Cachalia joined his father's business, which supplied school uniforms for black students, and completed an apprenticeship at a clothing manufacturing facility in Johannesburg, then opened such facilities in Malawi and Mozambique. In the late 1990s, Cachalia sold the businesses, which could not compete with clothing manufacturers from Asia in terms of price and supply. He retained only one retail outlet, whose shareholding he transferred to the company's employees; the business still runs in Johannesburg's central business district.

He then entered into management consultancy in Zurich, Switzerland, and in Johannesburg.

== Politics ==
Cachalia had been a lifelong supporter of the ANC. However, he had become increasingly disillusioned since the Arms Deal controversy, and now believes that the ANC cannot be saved from the "kleptocracy", corruption and self-interest that have come to characterise the party. This led him to turn to the DA, who he had "always valued" … "as a loyal opposition". He joined the DA as an ordinary member in early 2016, and ran as the DA's mayoral candidate for Ekurhuleni in the 2016 municipal elections, on a platform of transparent and accountable government. He lost to the ANC's candidate by only 11 votes.

In April 2017, Cachalia laid a criminal charge of incitement and intimidation against Ekurhuleni Mayor, Mzwandile Masina, for threatening white anti-Zuma protestors with violence, and requested that the Ekurhuleni Council Speaker, Patricia Khumalo, investigate the matter.

He was sworn in as a DA MP on 4 May 2017, and Philip de Lange took over the DA leadership in Ekurhuleni.

=== Positions ===
Cachalia considers himself "a liberal with a small L". He supports freedom of expression, and has defended Helen Zille in that respect, whom he has characterised as well-intentioned. He considers the Economic Freedom Fighters "social fascists".

In November 2023, Cachalia was sacked as Shadow Minister of Public Enterprises for making a comment on the Gaza war.

On 18 January 2024, Cachalia resigned as a member of the DA and parliament over differences with the party’s stance on the war between Israel and Hamas.
