= Pretoria High School =

Pretoria High School may refer to:

- Pretoria Boys High School, South Africa
- Pretoria High School for Girls, South Africa
- Pretoria North High School, South Africa
