= Chana Pilane-Majake =

South African politician (born 1957)

The Honourable Chana Pilane-Majake MP

Deputy Minister of Public Service and Administration
- Incumbent
- Assumed office 6 August 2021
- President: Cyril Ramaphosa
- Minister: Ayanda Dlodlo; Noxolo Kiviet
- Preceded by: Sindy Chikunga
- In office 27 February 2018 – 7 May 2019
- President: Cyril Ramaphosa
- Minister: Ayanda Dlodlo
- Preceded by: Dipuo Letsatsi-Duba
- Succeeded by: Sindy Chikunga

Member of the National Assembly
- In office 16 January 2012 – 28 May 2024
- Constituency: Gauteng

Personal details
- Born: Makgathatso Charlotte Chana Pilane; 13 February 1957 (age 69) Atteridgeville, Transvaal; Union of South Africa
- Party: African National Congress
- Education: University of the North; University of Natal; University of South Africa (PhD)

Makgathatso Charlotte Chana Pilane-Majake (née Pilane; born 13 February 1957) is a South African politician who served as the Deputy Minister of Public Service and Administration till 2024. She formerly held the same office between February 2018 and May 2019. A member of the African National Congress, she represented the Gauteng constituency in the National Assembly.

Born in Atteridgeville, Pilane-Majake was a social worker and human rights activist before she joined Parliament in January 2012. She was the chief executive officer of the Commission for Gender Equality from 2002 to 2010.

== Early life and education ==
Pilane-Majake was born on 13 February 1957 in Atteridgeville, a township outside Pretoria in the former Transvaal Province. Her mother was a nurse and her father was a member of the underground South African Communist Party, which was banned inside South Africa during apartheid. As a teenager, she left home to attend high school in the Northern Transvaal (present-day Limpopo Province).

She completed bachelor's and Honours degrees at the University of the North and a master's degree in social science at the University of Natal. In 2017, she was awarded a Doctor of Literature and Philosophy from the University of South Africa, with doctoral research focused on women's and HIV/AIDS issues.

== Early career ==
After finishing her undergraduate degree, Pilane-Majake lived for ten years in the Natal Province. She established her first ties to the African National Congress (ANC) during this period through her work for the South African Black Social Workers Association, an affiliate of the United Democratic Front. During the political violence of the post-apartheid transition, she was a counsellor and peace broker for affected families in the region. Between 1992 and 1994, she was also a member of the National Coordination Committee for Repatriation, which oversaw the return and reintegration of South African political exiles. Under the first post-apartheid government, she was the head of the South African delegation that bid for and won the right to host the 13th International Congress on Prevention of Child Abuse and Neglect, convened by the International Society for Prevention of Child Abuse and Neglect in Durban in 2000.

She later returned to Tshwane to work as a consultant and project officer for the European Union Foundation for Human Rights in South Africa. After that, between 2002 and 2010, she was the chief executive officer of the Commission for Gender Equality (CGE). Her tenure coincided with a tumultuous period at CGE. She was investigated – though largely cleared – by the Public Protector on maladministration charges in 2006, and she was suspended from her job in April 2008 due to further complaints by staff members. After a prolonged internal investigation, she was summarily dismissed in March 2009, though she went on to challenge her dismissal in the High Court and also laid her own complaints with the Public Protector, including one alleging misconduct by CGE's board chairperson, Nomboniso Gasa.

After leaving CGE in 2010, and until her election to Parliament two years later, Pilane-Majake was the executive director for human resources at VIP Consulting Engineers.

== National Assembly: 2012–present ==
On 16 January 2012, Pilane-Majake was sworn in to an ANC seat in the National Assembly, representing the Gauteng constituency. She replaced Mavis Magazi, who died in 2011. In the next general election in May 2014, she was re-elected to a full term in the seat, ranked 16th on the ANC's party list for Gauteng. She was the ANC's whip in the Portfolio Committee on Justice and Constitutional Development during the fifth democratic Parliament.

On 26 February 2018, newly elected President Cyril Ramaphosa announced a major cabinet reshuffle in which Pilane-Majake was promoted to become Deputy Minister of Public Service and Administration. She deputised Minister Ayanda Dlodlo, who was also newly appointed to the ministry, and succeeded Dipuo Letsatsi-Duba, who had become a full minister. She was sworn in at Tuynhuys the following day. However, she served less than two years in the office: after the May 2019 general election, when Ramaphosa announced his second-term cabinet, she was replaced as deputy minister by Sindy Chikunga.

However, Pilane-Majake was re-elected to her legislative seat in the election, ranked 21st on the Gauteng list, and the ANC announced her appointment as programming whip in the National Assembly. In this capacity she served alongside Bheki Radebe, the house whip, and under Pemmy Majodina, the chief whip. In June 2020, during a programming committee meeting about a Constitutional Court judgement that mandated amendments to the Electoral Act, she joined Majodina in complaining about judicial overreach; she said that she understood the need for judicial review of unjust laws, but that the judiciary was "more and more... just instructing Parliament" even in the absence of "a logical argument about how what is taking place is making the lives of citizens difficult".

Pilane-Majake returned to her position as Deputy Minister of Public Service and Administration after a reshuffle by Ramaphosa on 5 August 2021. Dlodlo returned as the minister in the same reshuffle, having spent a stint as Minister of State Security. She was sworn in on 6 August. After her return to the ministry, Pilane-Majake represented the government at the ninth session of the Conference of the States Parties to the United Nations Convention Against Corruption in Egypt, at which she pledged the government's commitment to fighting corruption.

In December 2022, she represented the Gauteng branch of the ANC at the party's 55th National Conference, where she supported Ramaphosa's successful bid to be re-elected as ANC president.
