= Philip van Staden =

South African politician (born 1975)

Philip van Staden MP
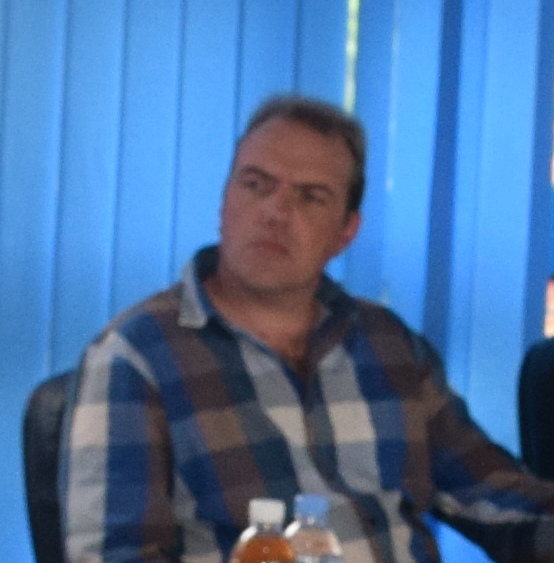
- Van Staden in 2018

Member of the National Assembly of South Africa
- Incumbent
- Assumed office 22 May 2019
- Constituency: Gauteng

Member of the Gauteng Provincial Legislature
- In office 21 May 2014 – 7 May 2019

Deputy Provincial Leader of the Freedom Front Plus
- Incumbent
- Assumed office 2013

Personal details
- Born: Philippus Adriaan van Staden; 5 December 1975 (age 50) Pretoria, South Africa
- Party: Freedom Front Plus
- Spouse: Sumare (m. 2014)
- Children: 1
- Education: Pretoria North High School
- Occupation: Member of Parliament
- Profession: Politician
- Committees: Portfolio Committee on Health
- Portfolio: Health

Philippus Adriaan van Staden (born 5 December 1975), known as Philip van Staden, is a South African politician from Gauteng. He has been serving as a Member of the National Assembly of South Africa for the Freedom Front Plus (FF+) since 2019. He previously represented the FF+ in the Gauteng Provincial Legislature from 2014 to 2019. Van Staden was a municipal councillor of the City of Tshwane Metropolitan Municipality from 2011 to 2014.

== Early life and education ==
Philippus Adriaan van Staden was born in 1975 in Pretoria, South Africa. He attended Voortrekker Eeufees Primary School and matriculated from Pretoria North High School. When he was a teenager, he became involved in politics. At age 17, he was the chairperson of the Afrikaner Volksfront branch in Pretoria North. Van Staden became a businessman after school.

== Political career ==
In 2005, Van Staden entered politics again. In 2008, he was elected to serve on the party's Gauteng provincial executive committee. He was the regional leader of the party in Pretoria from 2009 to 2016, the party's provincial organiser from 2009 to 2011, the party's mayoral candidate in the City of Tshwane Metropolitan Municipality in 2011 and a Tshwane city councillor between 2011 and 2014. In 2013, he was elected as the deputy provincial leader of the party, a position he currently still holds. He also serves as member of the party's federal council.

In 2014 he was elected as a Member of the Gauteng Provincial Legislature. As a member of the provincial legislature, he served on the programming, rules, local government and traditional affairs, roads and transport, petitions, ethics and human resources committees.

In 2019 he stood as a parliamentary candidate from Gauteng and was subsequently elected to the National Assembly and sworn in on 22 May 2019. He is a member of the Portfolio Committee on Health.

Van Staden was re-elected to the National Assembly in the 2024 general election.

== Personal life ==
Van Staden is married to Sumare Schonken. They have one daughter. They reside in Bergtuin, Pretoria.

In February 2022, Van Staden was diagnosed with prostate cancer. He underwent surgery to remove it in May 2022.
