= Van Onselen =

van Onselen is a Dutch surname. Notable people with the surname include:

- Charles van Onselen, South African historian
- Peter van Onselen (born 1976), Australian academic
- Gareth van Onselen, South African political strategist
