= Wildri Peach =

South African politician

Wildri Peach MP

Member of the National Assembly of South Africa
- Incumbent
- Assumed office 25 June 2024

Personal details
- Born: Wildri Dennis Peach; 20 November 1982 (age 43)
- Party: Democratic Alliance
- Occupation: Member of Parliament
- Profession: Politician

Wildri Peach (born 20 November 1982) is a South African politician who has been a Member of the National Assembly of South Africa for the Democratic Alliance (DA) since 2024.

== Background ==
Peach previously served as a member of the Gauteng Provincial Legislature for the DA from 2020 to 2024. During his time in the legislature he served as the DA's Gauteng spokesperson for Sports, Arts, Culture, and Recreation.

== Parliamentary career ==
Peach stood as a DA parliamentary candidate on the regional list for Gauteng in the 2009 national elections, but was not elected. Peach again stood as a DA parliamentary candidate on the regional list for Gauteng in the 2024 national elections and was subsequently elected to the National Assembly of South Africa. He was sworn in on 25 June 2024. He is a member of the Portfolio Committee on Forestry, Fisheries, and Environment and serves as the DA's deputy spokesperson on Forestry, Fisheries, and the Environment.
