= Melina Gomba =

South African politician

Melina Gomba MP

Member of Parliament from Gauteng
- In office 22 May 2019 – 28 May 2024

Personal details
- Party: ANC
- Education: Brown University

Matshidiso Melina Gomba is a South African politician who has been a Member of Parliament (MP) for the African National Congress since 2019.

She is currently the chair of the Portfolio Committee on Tourism.

On 22 October, Gomba graduated from Regenesys University with a bachelor's degree in Public Administration.
