= Danny Kekana =

South African politician

Member of the National Assembly
- In office 23 April 2004 – 7 May 2019
- Constituency: Gauteng

Personal details
- Born: Charles Danny Kekana; 27 November 1954 (age 71)
- Citizenship: South Africa
- Party: African National Congress
- Education: University of the North; Witwatersrand University

Charles Danny Kekana (born 27 November 1954) is a South African politician from Gauteng. He represented the African National Congress (ANC) in the National Assembly from 2004 to 2019. He was previously the Mayor of Northern Johannesburg during the post-apartheid transition.

== Early life and education ==
Born on 27 November 1954, Kekana holds a Bachelor of Arts from the University of the North and an Honours degree from Witwatersrand University; he was formerly a student activist. He is blind.

== Political career ==
Between the end of apartheid and the 2000 local elections, South Africa's democratic transition in local government entailed that the City of Johannesburg Metropolitan Municipality was divided into four Metropolitan Local Councils. When the Northern Metropolitan Council was established in 1995 – including Randburg and parts of Diepkloof, Soweto, and central Johannesburg – Kekana was appointed as its mayor. He later worked at the ANC's parliamentary office in Diepkloof and was active in the party's Johannesburg, Diepkloof, and Soweto structures, including as chairperson of the Soweto subregional branch.

In the 2004 general election, Kekana was elected to represent the ANC in the Gauteng caucus of the National Assembly. Re-elected in 2009 and 2014, he served as the ANC's whip in the Portfolio Committee on Higher Education and Training during the 26th Parliament from 2014 to 2019.
