= Robert Mashego =

South African politician

Chairperson of the Portfolio Committee on Water and Sanitation
- In office 31 August 2021 – 28 May 2024
- Preceded by: New committee
- Succeeded by: Leon Basson

Member of the National Assembly of South Africa
- In office 22 May 2019 – 28 May 2024
- Constituency: Gauteng

Personal details
- Born: Mfana Robert Mashego
- Party: African National Congress; South African Communist Party
- Occupation: Member of Parliament
- Profession: Politician

Mfana Robert Mashego is a South African politician who served as the Chairperson of the Portfolio Committee on Water and Sanitation in the National Assembly from 2021 until 2024. A member of the African National Congress, he was Member of Parliament from 2019 until 2024. Mashego is also a member of the South African Communist Party.

== Background ==
Mashego holds a local government certificate, a political school certificate from Walter Sisulu University, a certificate in public administration from the University of Pretoria, a certificate in International Capacity Building and Good Governance from Australia Habitat Studies, a local government and local governance qualification from the University of Johannesburg and a local democracy and local governance qualification from the International Training Centre of the International Labour Organization.

Mashego is a former deputy president of the South African Transport and Allied Workers Union and a former member of the organisation's provincial executive committee in Gauteng. He also served as the chairperson and as the deputy chairperson of the South African Communist Party in Ekurhuleni.

== Parliamentary career ==
Mashego was elected to the National Assembly in the 2019 general election from the ANC's Gauteng list. He served on the Portfolio Committee on Human Settlements, Water and Sanitation.

During a virtual committee meeting in April 2020 amid the COVID-19 pandemic in South Africa, Mashego was criticised for joking that fellow ANC MP Enock Mthethwa's Zoom background, which mainly consisted of whiskey bottles, was making him "thirsty" at a time the sale of alcoholic beverages were prohibited by the national government.

In August 2021, the ANC announced that Mashego would be taking up the role as chairperson of the newly established Portfolio Committee on Water and Sanitation. He was elected unopposed on 31 August.

Mashego was not listed as an ANC candidate for the 2024 general elections.
