= Bafuze Yabo =

South African politician

Member of the National Assembly of South Africa
- In office 22 May 2019 – 28 May 2024
- Constituency: Gauteng

Personal details
- Born: Bafuze Sicelo Yabo
- Party: African National Congress
- Profession: Politician

Bafuze Sicelo Yabo is a South African politician who served as a member of the National Assembly of South Africa from 2019 until 2024. Yabo is a member of the African National Congress.

== Political career ==
Yabo serves as the regional spokesperson of the African National Congress in Tshwane.

=== National Assembly of South Africa ===
Yabo was elected as an ANC Member of Parliament in the National Assembly in 2019. He was one of eight officials from the Regional Tshwane ANC structure, who were elected to parliament in the election.

He was a member of the Portfolio Committee on Basic Education and the Portfolio Committee on Higher Education, Science and Technology.

Yabo did not stand for reelection in 2024.
