= Gerhard Koornhof =

South African politician and economist

Gerhard Koornhof MP
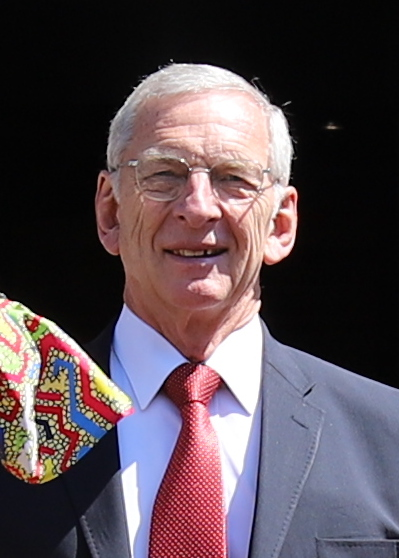
- Koornhof in 2023

Member of the National Assembly of South Africa
- Incumbent
- Assumed office 1994
- Constituency: Gauteng

Personal details
- Born: Gerhardus Willem Koornhof; 1951 or 1952 (age 74–75)
- Party: African National Congress (2003–present)
- Other political affiliations: United Democratic Movement (1999–2003); New National Party; National Party
- Spouse: Carolina
- Relations: Piet Koornhof (father)
- Children: 2
- Education: University of Pretoria
- Occupation: Member of Parliament
- Profession: Politician, economist

Gerhardus Willem Koornhof (born 1951 or 1952) is a South African politician and economist who serves as the Parliamentary Counsellor to President Cyril Ramaphosa. When Ramaphosa served as deputy president, Koornhof was his parliament counsellor. An MP since 1994, Koornhof currently represents the African National Congress, though he previously represented United Democratic Movement between 1999 and 2003 and the National Party/New National Party before that.

== Early life and education ==
Koornhof is the son of the late National Party politician Piet Koornhof. He attended the University of Pretoria, from which he graduated with a Bachelor of Commerce degree in 1974, a Bachelor of Commerce (Honours) in 1975, a Master of Commerce degree in 1979 and a Doctor of Commerce degree in 1982.

== Political career ==
Koornhof grew up in the National Party. He served as the Provincial Secretary of the National Party in the Transvaal Province between 1990 and 1994. Also in 1994, Koornhof was elected to the newly established National Assembly of South Africa in the first multi-racial elections as a representative of the NP. The NP was later rebranded as the New National Party. Koornhof left the NNP and joined Bantu Holomisa's United Democratic Movement. He was appointed deputy president. After the 1999 election, he returned to parliament as a UDM member. Koornhof resigned from the UDM in 2003 and joined the African National Congress. He was ranked 87th on the ANC's national list for the 2004 general election, and returned to parliament as an ANC member after the election. He has since been re-elected in 2009, 2014 and 2019.

Koornhof is a former chairperson of the ANC's Beyers Naude Branch. He was Whip for the Study Group on Public Enterprises & Ethics and Members’ Interests between 2009 and 2014 and served on the ANC Provincial Executive Committee in Gauteng between 2010 and 2018. After the 2014 election, Koornhof was appointed Parliamentary Counsellor to the newly appointed Deputy President of South Africa, Cyril Ramaphosa. Ramaphosa became president in 2018 and Koornhof remained as his parliamentary counsellor.

In January 2023, Koornhof and three other ANC party members were co-opted onto the National Executive Committee of the African National Congress in an attempt by the party to increase the representation of minorities on the party's highest decision-making body between national conferences.

== Personal life ==
Koornhof is married to Carolina, and they have two daughters. They live in Lynnwood, Pretoria.
