= Inathi Mbiyo =

South African politician

Inathi Mbiyo MP

Member of the National Assembly of South Africa
- Incumbent
- Assumed office 14 June 2024
- Constituency: Gauteng

Personal details
- Born: 18 June 1990 (age 36)
- Party: African National Congress
- Profession: Politician

Inathi Mirranda Mbiyo (born 18 June 1990) is a South African politician, who was elected to the National Assembly of South Africa in the 2024 general election as a member of the African National Congress.

== Political career ==
Mbiyo was elected onto the 46-member National Executive Committee of the African National Congress Youth League at the youth league's national elective conference in July 2023.

Mbiyo stood for election to the South African National Assembly in the 2024 general election, ranked 16th on the ANC's regional-to-national list in Gauteng. She won a seat in parliament and was sworn in on 14 June 2024. After her swearing-in, she was appointed as a whip for the ANC. Mbiyo sits on the Portfolio Committee on Police.
