= Portfolio Committee on Agriculture, Land Reform and Rural Development =

Portfolio committee in the National Assembly

The Portfolio Committee on Agriculture, Land Reform and Rural Development is a portfolio committee of the South African National Assembly in the Parliament of South Africa. The committee is responsible for oversight of the Department of Agriculture, Land Reform and Rural Development (DALRRD) and associated entities, including the Agricultural Research Council, the National Agricultural Marketing Council, the Perishable Products Export Control Board, the Onderstepoort Biological Products Limited, the Ingonyama Trust Board, the Registration of deeds trading account, the Agricultural landholdings account and the Office of the valuer-general.

== Membership ==
Following the May 8, 2019 general election, the Rules Committee settled on 5 June 2019 that all parliament committees will consist of 11 Members: African National Congress – 6; Democratic Alliance – 2; Economic Freedom Fighters – 1; other parties – 2. Committees were established on 27 June and Mandla Mandela was elected chairperson of the Portfolio Committee on Agriculture, Land Reform and Rural Development on 2 July. The membership of the committee is as follows:

Member	Party
Mandla Mandela MP (Chairperson)	African National Congress
Tammy Wessels MP	Freedom Front Plus
Ndumiso Capa MP	African National Congress
Russel Cebekhulu MP	Inkatha Freedom Party
Dibolelo Mahlatsi MP	African National Congress
Nhlagongwe Mahlo MP	African National Congress
Thandeka Mbabama MP	Democratic Alliance
Mothusi Montwedi MP	Economic Freedom Fighters
Annette Steyn MP	Democratic Alliance
Manketsi Tlhape MP	African National Congress
Busisiwe Tshwete MP	African National Congress

Additionally, the following people serve as alternate members:

- Phineas Masipa MP (Democratic Alliance)
- Simphiwe Mbatha MP (African National Congress)
- Munzoor Shaik Emam MP (National Freedom Party)
- Patrick Sindane MP (Economic Freedom Fighters)
- Wayne Thring MP (African Christian Democratic Party)
- Vuyolwethu Zungula MP (African Transformation Movement)
