= Boyce Maneli =

South African politician

Boyce Maneli MP

Chairperson of the Portfolio Committee on Employment and Labour
- Incumbent
- Assumed office 9 July 2024
- Preceded by: Lindelwa Dunjwa

Chairperson of the Portfolio Committee on Communications
- In office 21 August 2019 – 28 May 2024
- Preceded by: Hope Papo
- Succeeded by: Khusela Sangoni

Member of the National Assembly of South Africa
- Incumbent
- Assumed office 22 May 2019
- Constituency: Gauteng

Executive Mayor of the West Rand District Municipality
- In office 25 August 2016 – May 2019
- Preceded by: Mpho Nawa
- Succeeded by: Dennis Thabe

Regional Chairperson of ANC West Rand Region
- In office 2014–2018

Personal details
- Born: Boyce Makhosonke Maneli
- Party: African National Congress
- Education: North-West University (BA); MANCOSA (BPAHons)
- Occupation: Member of Parliament
- Profession: Politician

Boyce Makhosonke Maneli is a South African politician from Gauteng who has been Chairperson of the Portfolio Committee on Employment and Labour since 2024 and a Member of Parliament for the African National Congress since 2019. He had previously served as the Executive Mayor of the West Rand District Municipality from 2016 to 2019 and as the Regional Chairperson of the ANC's West Rand Region from 2014 to 2018.

== Education ==
Maneli earned a Bachelor of Arts (BA) in Development and Management from the North-West University and an Honours degree in Public Administration from MANCOSA.

== Politics ==
Maneli served as the Regional Chairperson of the West Rand Region of the African National Congress from 2014 to 2018 and as the Executive Mayor of the West Rand District Municipality from 2016 to 2019. He is a member of the Provincial Executive Committee (PEC) of the ANC in Gauteng.

=== Parliamentary career ===
Maneli stood as an ANC parliamentary candidate from Gauteng in the 2019 national elections, and was elected to the National Assembly and sworn in on 22 May 2019. In June 2019, Maneli was appointed to serve on the Portfolio Committee on Communications and the Portfolio Committee on Public Service and Administration. Following the resignation of Hope Papo, Maneli was elected unopposed as Chairperson of the Portfolio Committee on Communications on 21 August 2019.

He served as an alternate member of the Committee for Section 194 Enquiry before becoming a member.

Following the 2024 general election, Maneli was elected to chair the Portfolio Committee on Employment and Labour.

=== VBS Mutual Bank ===
On 9 August 2020, the ANC Provincial Executive Committee (PEC) decided that Maneli and Merafong mayor Maphefo Letsie should resign from their positions for failing to act against officials implicated in the VBS Mutual Bank scandal. Maneli responded by saying that he won't resign and that he will approach the National Executive Committee of the African National Congress to appeal the adverse findings against him. He said that he has proof that action was taken against implicated officials at the West Rand District Municipality. The municipality had invested R81 million at the bank and nearly R2 billion was looted from the bank before it collapsed. In October 2020, the PEC said that Maneli should be suspended with immediate effect. In February 2022, the ANC's national dispute resolution committee (NDRC) set aside the PEC's decision for Letsie and Maneli to resign from their positions.
