= Bonginkosi Dhlamini =

South African politician (born 1967)

Bonginkosi Dhlamini MPL

Member of the Gauteng Executive Council for e-Government
- Incumbent
- Assumed office 3 July 2024
- Premier: Panyaza Lesufi
- Preceded by: Office established
- Constituency: Gauteng

Member of the Gauteng Provincial Legislature
- Incumbent
- Assumed office May 2010

Member of the National Assembly
- In office 21 June 2000 – 4 May 2010

Personal details
- Born: Bonginkosi Wesley Dhlamini; 25 July 1967 (age 59)
- Citizenship: South Africa
- Party: Inkatha Freedom Party

Bonginkosi Wesley Dhlamini (born 25 July 1967) is a South African politician who has been a member of the Gauteng Executive Council for e-Government since June 2024 and has represented the Inkatha Freedom Party (IFP) in the Gauteng Provincial Legislature since May 2010. He is the current provincial chairperson of the IFP in Gauteng and formerly represented the party in the National Assembly from 2000 to 2010.

== Early life and career ==
Dhlamini grew up in Soweto in the former Transvaal during apartheid. He joined the IFP (then known as Inkatha) in 1983 and served as chairperson of Inkatha's Soweto branch from 1985 to 1987.

== National Assembly: 2000–2010 ==
Dhlamini was first sworn in to Parliament on 21 June 2000, representing the IFP in the Gauteng constituency; he filled the casual vacancy that arose when Themba Khoza died. He served in the National Assembly until May 2000, gaining re-election in 2004 and 2009. In 2006, he was questioned in the liquidation inquiry that emanated from the Travelgate scandal.

During the xenophobic violence of May 2008, Dhlamini addressed a crowd in Alexandra, the epicentre of the violence, and sought to ameliorate tensions. According to the Mail & Guardian, he said told the crowd:

As the IFP, we are here to make it clear that we condemn these attacks and are here to ask you not to go around attacking people in the IFP’s name... indeed the government has failed you, but you should not continue these attacks as opportunistic criminals will take advantage and you, as South Africans, would end up fighting against each other. As the IFP we understand your frustrations, however, our Constitution says South Africa is a South Africa for all, which means everyone including the foreigners are welcome. The IFP argued that the Constitution should, in fact, say South Africa is a South Africa for all that were born in it, however, the ANC, as usual, did not listen to us.

Dhlamini resigned from the National Assembly just over a year after the 2009 election, on 4 May 2010, when the IFP arranged for him to swap seats with Petros Sithole. Dhlamini was sworn in to Sithole's seat in the Gauteng Provincial Legislature in order to "focus his full attention on the needs of Gauteng".

== Provincial legislature: 2010–present ==
He has served in the provincial legislature since May 2010, gaining re-election in 2014 and 2019. At the IFP's provincial elective conference in Ekurhuleni in October 2019, Dhlamini was elected provincial chairperson of the IFP in Gauteng, with Zandile Majozi as his deputy.

The ANC lost its majority in the Gauteng Provincial Legislature in the 2024 provincial election. ANC premier Panyaza Lesufi subsequently formed a minority government with the support of the Inkatha Freedom Party and other parties. Dhlamini was appointed by Lesufi as the MEC for the newly established e-Government portfolio on 3 July 2024.
