= Liam Jacobs =

South African politician (born 2001)

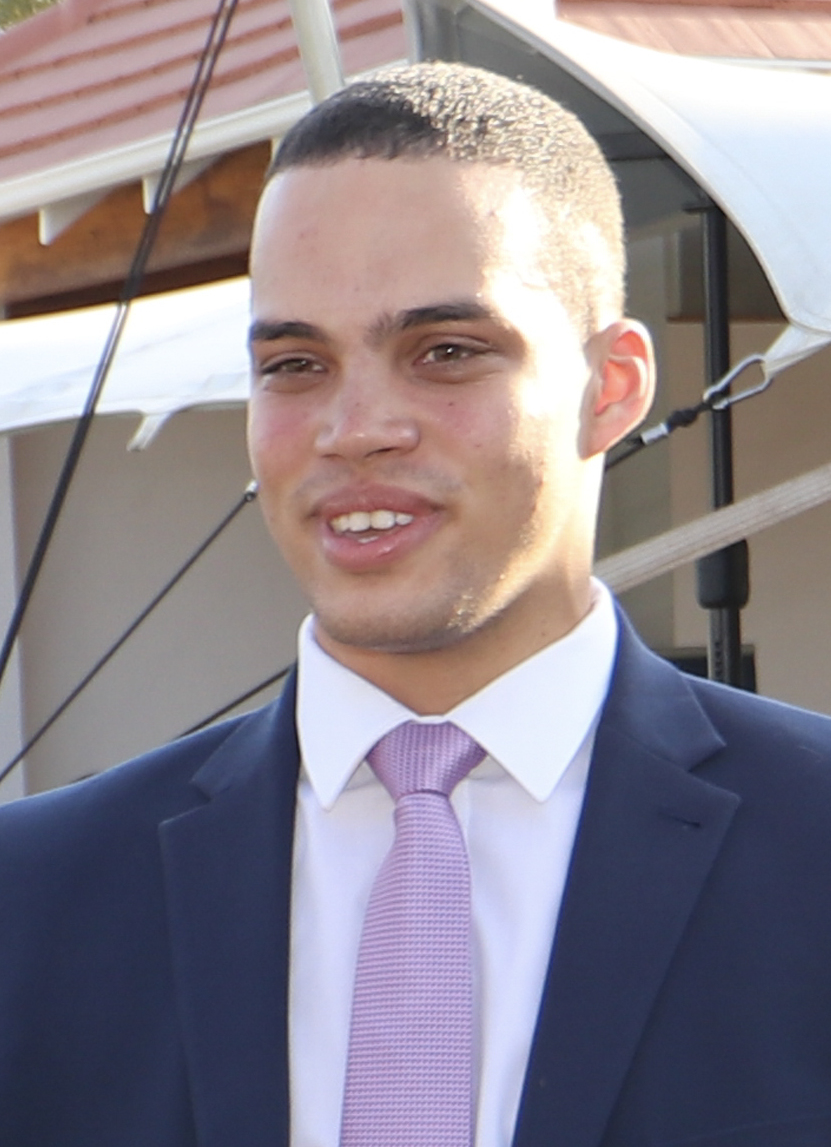
- Liam Jacobs in 2024

Member of the National Assembly of South Africa
- In office 14 June 2024 – 14 June 2025
- Constituency: Gauteng

Personal details
- Born: Liam Chad Jacobs Kimberley, Northern Cape
- Party: DA
- Other political affiliations: PA (2025–2026); ANC (2021)
- Education: University of Pretoria (BAHons)
- Profession: Politician
- Committees: Sports, Arts, and Culture

Liam Chad Jacobs is a South African politician and a former Member of Parliament (MP) for the Democratic Alliance (DA). He was the leader of the Democratic Alliance Students Organisation (DASO) from October 2022 until his defection to the Patriotic Alliance in June 2025. He was elected to the National Assembly of South Africa for Gauteng in the 2024 South African general election. He has since rejoined the DA.

== Early life ==
Jacobs was born in Kimberley in the Northern Cape. Jacobs holds an honours degree in Philosophy, Politics, and Economics from the University of Pretoria.

== Career ==
Jacobs was Students’ Organisation Leader for the DA. In the 2024 South African general election, he was 60th on the national party list. During his tenure as a DA MP, he served on the Portfolio Committee on Sports, Arts, and Culture.

In June 2025, Jacobs announced he was leaving the DA, and joining the Patriotic Alliance. This development came despite Jacobs and PA president and Minister of Sports, Arts and Culture, Gayton Mackenzie, clashing during a committee meeting earlier that week.

In July 2025, Patriotic Alliance president Gayton McKenzie unveiled Jacobs as a councillor of the City of Johannesburg.This was following the recent resignation of Member of the Mayoral Committee (MMC) for Transport, Kenny Kunene after he was found at the house of one of the arrested suspects in the case of DJ Sumbody.

Jacobs rejoined the Democratic Alliance in June 2026.

== See also ==
- List of National Assembly members of the 28th Parliament of South Africa
