= Mariam Muhammad =

South African politician

Mariam Muhammad MP

Member of the National Assembly of South Africa
- Incumbent
- Assumed office 25 June 2024
- Constituency: Gauteng

Personal details
- Party: uMkhonto weSizwe
- Profession: Politician

Mariam Be Be Muhammad is a South African politician and a Member of the National Assembly of South Africa for the uMkhonto weSizwe party.

Muhammad is from Dannhauser in KwaZulu-Natal and resides in Zone 11 in Johannesburg, Gauteng.

She stood for MK in the 2024 general elections as the first candidate on the party's Gauteng regional list and won a seat in the National Assembly. Since MK boycotted the first sitting of the National Assembly following the election on 14 June 2024, she was sworn in on 25 June along with the other MK MPs.

Muhammad is a member of the Portfolio Committee on Home Affairs.
