= Nomathemba Maseko-Jele =

South African politician (born 1964)

Member of the National Assembly of South Africa
- In office 22 May 2019 – 28 May 2024

Personal details
- Born: 22 October 1964 (age 61)
- Party: African National Congress
- Education: University of South Africa (BA); University of Witwatersrand (BA); University of Johannesburg

Nomathemba Hendrietta Maseko-Jele (born 22 October 1964) is a South African politician who served as a Member of the National Assembly of South Africa representing the African National Congress (ANC).

== Education ==
Maseko-Jele holds a teachers high diploma. She graduated from the University of South Africa with a Bachelor of Arts in education. She also earned a BA degree in music and a performing arts management degree from the University of the Witwatersrand. She completed a Higher Diploma in law at the University of Johannesburg. She is currently studying for a LLB through UNISA.

== Political career ==
Maseko-Jele serves on the provincial working committee (PWC) of the African National Congress Women's League in Gauteng. She formerly served as the regional secretary of the ANC women's league. Maseko-Jele served as the first secretary of the ANC Grace Flathela Zone, as the first female chairperson of ANC Ward 60 branch in Ekurhuleni, and as the first Ekurhuleni Women's Forum chairwoman.

Maseko-Jele stood for the provincial legislature in 2014 as a candidate low on the ANC provincial legislature list and was not elected.

== Parliamentary career ==
Maseko-Jele stood for the National Assembly in 2019 and was elected from the ANC's regional list in Gauteng. She was a member of the Portfolio Committee on Justice and Correctional Services and the Constitutional Review Committee.

Maseko-Jele was given the 198th position on the ANC's candidate list for the 2024 general election, far too low to secure re-election.
