= George Boinamo =

South African politician

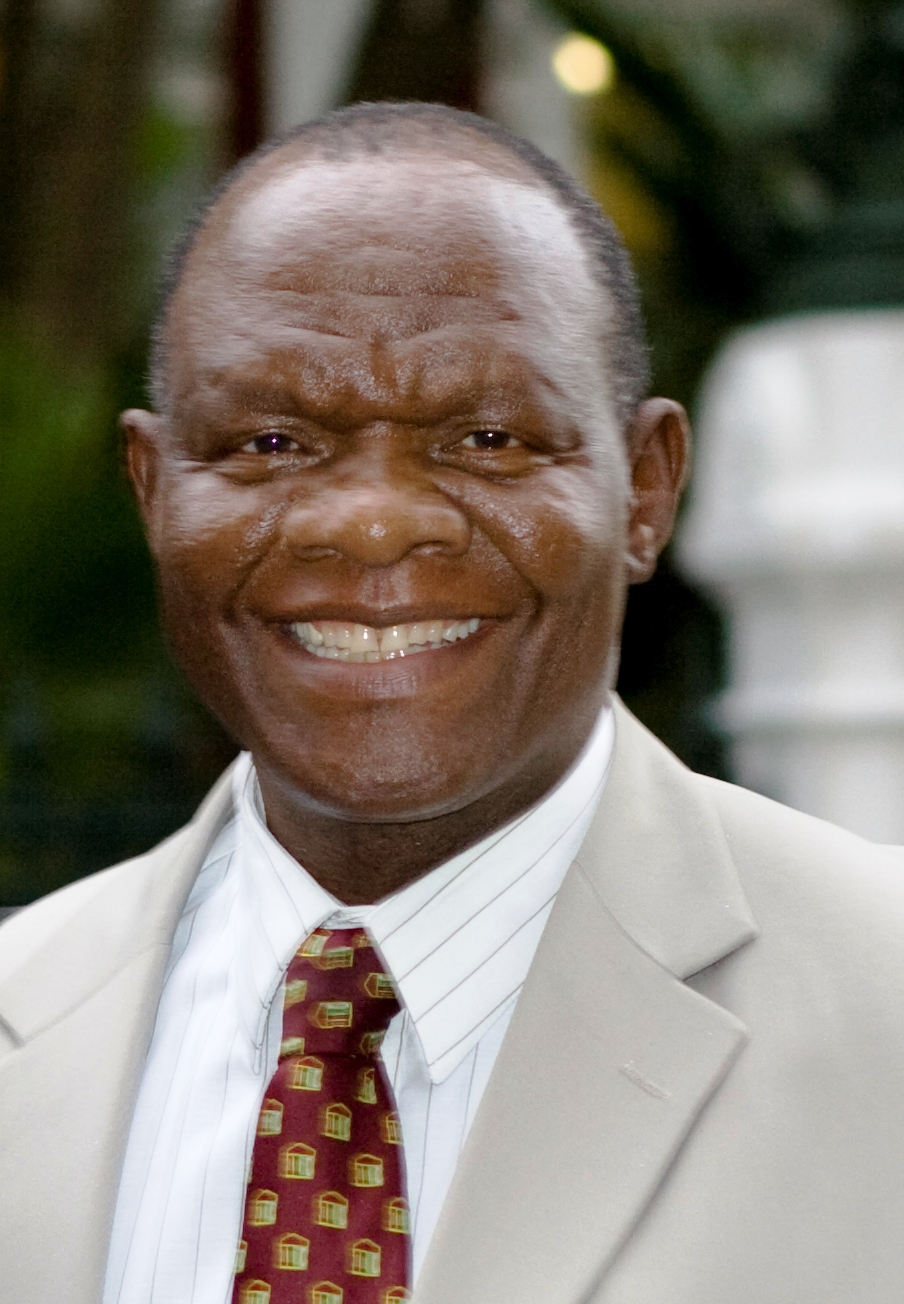
- Boinamo in 2009

Member of the National Assembly of South Africa
- In office 2004–2014

DA Shadow Deputy Minister of Cooperative Governance and Traditional Affairs
- In office 1 February 2012 – 6 May 2014
- Leader: Lindiwe Mazibuko
- Preceded by: Marta Wenger
- Succeeded by: Nqaba Bhanga

DA Shadow Deputy Minister of Labour
- In office 6 September 2010 – 1 February 2012
- Leader: Lindiwe Mazibuko; Athol Trollip
- Preceded by: Ian Ollis
- Succeeded by: Haniff Hoosen

DA Shadow Deputy Minister of Higher Education and Training
- In office 14 May 2009 – 6 September 2010
- Leader: Athol Trollip
- Preceded by: Position established
- Succeeded by: Andricus van der Westhuizen

Personal details
- Born: George Gaolatlhe Boinamo; 1948 (age 77–78)
- Party: Democratic Alliance (2003–present)
- Spouse: Moira
- Profession: Politician; Educator

George Gaolatlhe Boinamo (born 1948) is a South African politician who served as a Member of the National Assembly of South Africa for the Democratic Alliance from 2004 to 2014.

== Early life and education ==
Boinamo was born in 1948. He trained to become a teacher at the Hebron College of Education in 1978. He went on to obtain a Bachelor of Arts in Education from the University of the Witwatersrand, before graduating with a Master's degree in Education in 1997.

== Political career ==
Boinamo joined the Democratic Alliance in 2003 and was elected to the National Assembly in 2004. During his first term, he was the DA's spokesperson on education. In October 2008, Boinamo voted against the disbandment of the Scorpions.

After his re-election to parliament in 2009, Boinamo was appointed Shadow Deputy Minister of Higher Education and Training. He served in the position until September 2010, when he replaced Ian Ollis as Shadow Deputy Minister of Labour. He became the Shadow Deputy Minister of Cooperative Governance and Traditional Affairs in February 2012.

Boinamo did not stand for re-election in the 2014 general election. He left parliament on 6 May 2014.

== Personal life ==
Boinamo is married to Moira. In 2008, Boinamo and his wife were the victims of an alleged racist attack.
