= Tandi Mahambehlala =

South African politician

Tandi Mahambehlala MP

Deputy Minister of Human Settlements
- Incumbent
- Assumed office 3 July 2024

Chairperson of the Portfolio Committee on Tourism
- In office 7 September 2021 – 2024
- Preceded by: Supra Mahumapelo

Chairperson of the Portfolio Committee on International Relations and Cooperation
- In office 2 July 2019 – 27 August 2021
- Preceded by: Moses Masango
- Succeeded by: Supra Mahumapelo

Deputy Minister of Communications
- In office 31 March 2017 – 26 February 2018

Member of the National Assembly of South Africa
- Incumbent
- Assumed office 21 May 2014
- Constituency: Western Cape (2014–2019); National List (2019–present)

Personal details
- Party: African National Congress
- Education: University of the Western Cape
- Profession: Politician

Tandi Mahambehlala is a South African politician who has served as the Deputy Minister of Human Settlements since 3 July 2024. She was the Chairperson of the Portfolio Committee on Tourism from 2021. A member of the African National Congress (ANC), she served as the Chairperson of the Portfolio Committee on International Relations and Cooperation from 2019 to 2021. Mahambehlala was Deputy Minister of Communications between 2017 and 2018. She has been a Member of Parliament since 2014.

== Early life and education ==
Mahambehlala served on the Students' Representative Council of Msobomvu High School from 1988 to 1990. She earned an advanced diploma in Public Administration in 2014 and an honours degree in Public Administration from the University of the Western Cape in 2016. In 2017, Mahambehlala began studying for a Master of Public Administration through UWC. She also holds certificates in Audio-Visual Communications, Community Profiling and Community Needs Assessment and Programme Design and Presentation.

== Career ==
In 2005, Mahambehlala was involved with the establishment of the Western Cape Youth Commission. She was an African National Congress Youth League (ANCYL) branch secretary and the deputy secretary of the league's Dullah Omar Region from 2004 to 2008. From 2005 to 2008, she worked as a community developer for the City of Cape Town's Department of Social Development. In 2008, she was elected as the provincial secretary of the African National Congress in the Western Cape, a position she held until 2011. From 2011 to 2014, Mahambehlala worked for Eskom as a senior advisor responsible for Stakeholder Relations.

== Parliamentary career ==
Mahambehlala stood as an ANC parliamentary candidate from the Western Cape in the 2014 national elections, and was subsequently elected to the National Assembly and sworn in on 21 May 2014. She was then appointed to parliamentary portfolio committees on energy, small business development, and telecommunications and postal services.

In March 2017, she was appointed as the Deputy Minister of Communications by president Jacob Zuma. She held the position until 26 February 2018, when newly elected president Cyril Ramaphosa announced his cabinet.

Mahambehlala stood for re-election at 49th on the ANC's national list in the 2019 national elections and was re-elected. She was then elected as the chair of the Portfolio Committee on International Relations and Cooperation. During her time as chair of the committee, Mahambehlala was critical of International Relations Minister Naledi Pandor's inaction against officials implicated in the controversial purchase of a dilapidated building in New York for R118 million, telling Pandor during a committee meeting in February 2021: "You must spare yourself from self-importance — your utterances, I find them very arrogant."

On 26 August 2021, the ANC announced that Mahambehlala would swap positions with Supra Mahumapelo, the chairperson of the Portfolio Committee on Tourism. She stepped down as chair of the portfolio committee on international relations and cooperation on 27 August 2021. On 7 September 2021, she was voted in as chairperson of the Portfolio Committee on Tourism, replacing Mahumapelo.

In December 2022, Mahambehlala was one of five ANC MPs who defied the party's instruction to vote against the adoption on the Section 89 Panel report on whether sufficient evidence exists to show that President Cyril Ramaphosa committed a serious violation of the Constitution or law or committed a serious misconduct amid the 2020 Phala Phala Robbery, but before voting closed Mahambehlala attempted to change her vote. The ANC has responded by saying that disciplinary action will be taken against them.
