= Dorothy Ramodibe =

South African politician (born 1942)

Member of the National Assembly
- In office 23 April 2004 – 6 May 2014

Personal details
- Born: 20 April 1942 (age 84)
- Citizenship: South Africa
- Party: African National Congress

Dorothy Mapula Ramodibe (born 20 April 1942) is a retired South African politician who represented the African National Congress (ANC) in the National Assembly from 2004 to 2014. Before that, she served in the Gauteng Provincial Legislature.

Ramodibe was active in the ANC Women's League: she chaired the league's provincial branch in the Western Cape and at another time was deputy chairperson of the provincial branch in Gauteng.

== Legislative career ==
In the 1999 general election, Ramodibe was elected to the Gauteng Provincial Legislature, where she served a single term. In the next general election in 2004, she was elected to the National Assembly, representing the ANC in the Gauteng constituency. She was elected to a second term in the assembly in 2009, now as a candidate on the ANC's national list.

In November 2010, the ANC announced a reshuffle of its parliamentary caucus which saw Ramodibe promoted to become chairperson of the Portfolio Committee on Women, Children and People with Disabilities. She held the chairmanship until the 2014 general election, in which she did not stand for re-election to the National Assembly.
