= Tumelo Ramongalo =

South African politician

Tumelo Ramongalo MP

Member of the National Assembly of South Africa
- Incumbent
- Assumed office 25 June 2024

Personal details
- Born: Tumelo Robert Ramongalo
- Party: Democratic Alliance
- Occupation: Member of Parliament
- Profession: Politician

Tumelo Ramongalo is a South African politician who has been a Member of the National Assembly of South Africa for the Democratic Alliance (DA) since 2024.

== Background ==
At the 2016 municipal elections, Ramongalo was elected as a DA councillor on the Sedibeng District Municipality council. He also served as the DA's Youth Chairperson for the Vaal region.

At the 2021 municipal elections, he was elected as a DA councillor on the Emfuleni Local Municipality council and served as Deputy Chairperson of the DA caucus on the council.

In 2021, Ramongalo was a fellow with the Mandela Washington Fellowship for Young African Leaders (YALI) at Bridgewater State University in Massachusetts.

== Parliamentary career ==
Ramongalo stood as a DA parliamentary candidate on the regional list for Gauteng in the 2019 general election but was not elected. He again stood as a DA candidate on the Gauteng list in the 2024 national elections and was subsequently elected to the National Assembly of South Africa. He was sworn in on 25 June 2024. He is the first DA member of parliament from Emfuleni. He is a member of the Portfolio Committee on Science, Technology, and Innovation and is an alternate member of the Portfolio Committee on Sport, Arts, and Culture. He also serves as the DA's Deputy Spokesperson on Science, Technology and Innovation.

In 2024, he helped form the Vaal branch of the DA Rainbow Network (DARN), the party's LGBT organization.
