= Storey Morutoa =

South African politician (1939–2021)

Member of the National Assembly
- In office 1 November 2001 – 7 May 2019
- Constituency: Gauteng

Personal details
- Born: 14 May 1939
- Died: 7 July 2021 (aged 82)
- Citizenship: South Africa
- Party: African National Congress

Masefele Rosalia "Storey" Morutoa (14 May 1939 – 7 July 2021) was a South African politician who represented the African National Congress (ANC) in the National Assembly from 2001 to 2019, serving the Gauteng constituency. She chaired the Joint Monitoring Committee on Women from 2004 to 2009 and the Joint Multi-Party Women's Caucus from 2014 to 2019. A veteran of the ANC, which she joined in 1965, Morutoa was active in the anti-apartheid movement in Soweto.

== Early life and activism ==
Morutoa was born on 14 May 1939. She joined the ANC underground in 1965, while the party was still banned by the apartheid government, and in the 1980s was active in the Federation of South African Women and in civic organisations in Soweto. After the ANC was unbanned, she rose through its ranks, serving as the executive of the party's branch, regional, and then provincial branches. She was also a former member of the ANC Women's League national executive committee.

== Legislative career: 2001–2019 ==
Morutoa was sworn into an ANC seat in the National Assembly on 1 November 2001, filling the casual vacancy created when Duma Nkosi left to become Mayor of Ekurhuleni. She was elected to her first full term in the 2004 general election and ultimately served continuously in her seat until the 2019 general election, representing the Gauteng constituency.

=== JMC on Women: 2004–2009 ===
From 2004 to 2009, she succeeded Lulu Xingwana as chair of Parliament's Joint Monitoring Committee on the Improvement of the Quality of Life and Status of Women (JMC). She entered the JMC at a difficult time: former chair Pregs Govender, under whom the JMC had taken on an activist role, had resigned in mid-2002 under pressure from her party. Under Morutoa, the JMC was described as having "lost momentum" and as "practically dysfunctional"; the Mail & Guardian suspected that Morutoa retained the chairmanship "by keeping her head low". The committee was dissolved and replaced by a portfolio committee after the 2009 general election.

=== Women's Caucus: 2014–2019 ===
After the 2014 general election, Morutoa was the MP who nominated Jacob Zuma for election to his second term as President of South Africa; she said that her motion was the will of "the African National Congress and millions of South Africans". During the following legislative term, she chaired Parliament's Joint Multi-Party Women's Caucus.

Under her leadership, the caucus made the legal status of sex work a priority issue. Morutoa advocated strongly for the full decriminalisation of sex work, arguing that it was the only way to allow sex workers full access to the criminal justice system, had the potential to address South Africa's HIV/AIDS crisis, and was supported both by evidence and by sex workers themselves. When the South African Law Reform Commission published a report recommending against full decriminalisation, the women's caucus under Morutoa held a summit on sex workers, at which stakeholders were invited to submit on the report and on broader policy.

== Retirement and death ==
Morutoa left Parliament after the 2019 general election and died on 7 July 2021 from COVID-19.
