= Maggie Maunye =

South African politician

Member of the National Assembly
- In office 1996 – 6 May 2014
- Constituency: Gauteng

Personal details
- Born: 28 November 1947 (age 78)
- Citizenship: South Africa
- Party: African National Congress

Maggie Margaret Maunye (born 28 November 1947) is a South African politician who represented the African National Congress (ANC) in the National Assembly from 1996 to 2014, serving the Gauteng constituency. She chaired the Portfolio Committee on Home Affairs from 2011 to 2014.

== Early life and activism ==
Maunye was born on 28 November 1947. During apartheid, she was a member of the Federation of Transvaal Women and the Soweto Civic Association, and she was secretary of the Save the Patriots campaign committee, which advocated for the release of political prisoners.

== Legislative career: 1996–2014 ==
She joined the National Assembly in 1996 and was elected to a full term in 1999. She ultimately served until after the 2014 general election, gaining re-election in 2004 and 2009. She represented the Gauteng constituency. She sat on several committees, among them the Joint Standing Committee on Defence, and in 2013 the ANC nominated her to sit on an ad hoc committee which considered the Public Protector's report about procurement irregularities at the Electoral Commission under Pansy Tlakula.

=== Home Affairs: 2011–2014 ===
In January 2011, Maunye was elected to succeed Ben Martins as chairperson of the Portfolio Committee on Home Affairs. Later that year, at a committee meeting in June, she made highly controversial remarks in which she appeared to support "turning refugees back to their countries". IOL quoted her as saying:

Really, this intake [of foreigners], for how long are we going to continue with this as South Africans? Is it not going to affect our resources, the economy of the country? I think that as the portfolio committee, we need to sit down and discuss this openly; on how long are we going to continue with the intake without the support of other countries... You know, we see on TV Spain turning refugees back to their countries, and here you will be told of human rights laws; you know the constitution is against that and all sorts of excuses, and here we have people who are living in poverty daily, people who are unemployed. We've never enjoyed our freedom as South Africans. We got it in 1994 and we had floods and floods of refugees or undocumented people in the country, and we always want to play as if no there’s nothing like that.

Lawyers for Human Rights said that her remarks were uninformed and blatantly xenophobic. Several days later, the ANC's chief whip said that Maunye "deeply regrets the comments and unconditionally apologises for the harm they may have caused".
