= Peter Maluleka =

South African politician (born 1954)

Member of the National Assembly
- In office 23 April 2004 – 6 May 2014
- Constituency: Gauteng

Personal details
- Born: Holmes Peter Maluleka; 25 March 1954 (age 72)
- Citizenship: South Africa
- Party: African National Congress

Holmes Peter Maluleka (born 25 March 1954) is a South African politician and businessman from Gauteng. A former Umkhonto we Sizwe operative, he represented the African National Congress (ANC) in the National Assembly from 2004 to 2014. During that period, he chaired the Portfolio Committee on Public Enterprises from 2010 to 2014. He later served on the board of South African Airways.

== Early life and activism ==
Born on 5 March 1954, Maluleka began school in Eersterus until his family moved to Mamelodi in 1964. After leaving school in 1973, he worked for Siemens Telecommunications for 11 years. In 1985, he started his own carpentry business. Also in 1985, he formally joined the underground of the African National Congress (ANC) and began military training in Pretoria as a member of Umkhonto we Sizwe (MK). He was also deputy chairperson of the Mamelodi Civic Organisation.

=== Church Street bombing ===
On 15 April 1988, on the instructions of MK, Maluleka exploded a limpet mine on Church Street in Pretoria, causing damage to several businesses in the vicinity. His commander, Odeille Maponya, died earlier on the same day when his own mine exploded prematurely. He later said that the explosions were intended to make a political statement about the ANC's presence inside South Africa and to spearhead the movement's armed propaganda.

In June 1988, he was arrested and put on trial along with 11 other activists. The secretary of the Mamelodi Civic Organisation, Stanza Bopape, was arrested in the same month and died in detention. Maluleka was convicted in 1991 but, on the day of his sentencing, he was indemnified by the state as part of the confidence-building measures towards negotiations to end apartheid. He later applied for and was granted amnesty for the bombing by the Truth and Reconciliation Commission.

== Post-apartheid political career ==
After the abolition of apartheid in 1994, Maluleka joined the transitional local government in Pretoria, chairing the executive committee of the municipality (then called the Greater Pretoria Municipality). After the December 2000 elections, in which Pretoria was merged into the City of Tshwane Metropolitan Municipality, he was elected as speaker of the new council, serving under Mayor Smangaliso Mkhatshwa. He was also the chairperson of the ANC's branch in Pretoria.

In the 2004 general election, Maluleka was elected to an ANC seat in the National Assembly, serving the Gauteng constituency. He served two terms in the seat, gaining re-election in 2009. In addition, in November 2010, the ANC nominated him to chair the Portfolio Committee on Public Enterprises; he replaced Vytjie Mentor, whose tenure had been marred by allegations that she had solicited a free trip to China from Transnet, one of the public enterprises under the committee's oversight. He served as committee chairperson until the 2014 general election; though he stood for re-election to the National Assembly, he was ranked 34th on the ANC's regional party list for Gauteng and did not win a seat.

== Later career ==
In 2016, Maluleka was appointed to a three-year term as a non-executive director of South African Airways. Although the board, under Dudu Myeni's leadership, was reshuffled a year later, he retained his seat.
