= Janho Engelbrecht =

South African politician

Janho Engelbrecht MP

Member of the National Assembly of South Africa
- Incumbent
- Assumed office 4 March 2021
- Preceded by: Belinda Bozzoli

Member of the Gauteng Provincial Legislature
- In office 21 May 2014 – 2 March 2021

Personal details
- Born: Janho Engelbrecht
- Party: Democratic Alliance
- Other political affiliations: Democratic Party
- Children: 2
- Profession: Politician

Janho Engelbrecht is a South African politician and a member of the National Assembly of South Africa for the Democratic Alliance (DA). He had previously served as a member of the Gauteng Provincial Legislature.

== Political career ==
Engelbrecht joined the Democratic Party in 1991 and served as the party's branch chairperson at the Potchefstroom University from 1993 to 1995. In 2006, he was elected as a ward councillor in the City of Tshwane Metropolitan Municipality for the Democratic Alliance. He was selected as the DA's campaign manager for the City of Tshwane for the 2011 municipal elections. The DA caucus managed to grow 47 to 82 members and Engelbrecht was re-elected as a PR councillor at the election. He was then promoted to chief whip of the DA caucus.

In February 2012, Engelbrecht suffered a mild heart attack after a heated argument with African National Congress councillors.

In 2014, he stood for the Gauteng Provincial Legislature as 18th on the DA's list. The DA retained its position as the official opposition in the province and Engelbrecht was elected to the provincial legislature. During his first term, he was a member of the Governance & Administration Cluster Committees and the Infrastructure Development Committee.

Engelbrecht was re-elected to the provincial legislature in 2019. He then became a member of the Roads and Transport Committee and an alternate member of the Economic Development, Environment, Agriculture & Rural Development committee.

On 2 March 2021, Engelbrecht resigned from the Gauteng provincial legislature after the DA selected him to fill the late Belinda Bozzoli's seat in the National Assembly. He was sworn in as an MP on 4 March 2021. He was elected to a full term in the 2024 general election.

== Personal life ==
Engelbrecht lives in Centurion in Gauteng. He has two sons, Cilliers and Jandro.
