= Tebogo Letsie =

South African politician

Tebogo Letsie MP

Member of the National Assembly of South Africa
- Incumbent
- Assumed office 22 May 2019
- Constituency: Gauteng

Personal details
- Born: Walter Tebogo Letsie
- Party: African National Congress
- Occupation: Member of Parliament
- Profession: Politician

Walter Tebogo Letsie is a South African politician. In 2019 he became a Member of Parliament (MP) for the African National Congress.

Since becoming an MP, he has served on the Portfolio Committee on Basic Education and the Portfolio Committee on Higher Education, Science and Technology.

Letsie was re-elected to another term in the National Assembly in 2024.
