= Evert du Plessis =

South African politician

Evert du Plessis MPL

Member of the Gauteng Provincial Legislature
- Incumbent
- Assumed office 11 March 2021

Personal details
- Born: Evert Phillipus du Plessis; 26 July 1974 (age 51)
- Party: Democratic Alliance
- Other political affiliations: Democratic
- Spouse: Yolande Thiart du Plessis
- Children: 2
- Education: Carletonville High School
- Alma mater: North West University - Potchefstroom Campus
- Occupation: Politician

Evert Phillipus du Plessis (born 26 July 1974) is a South African politician and a Member of the Gauteng Provincial Legislature for the Democratic Alliance (DA).

== Early life and education ==
Du Plessis was born on 26 July 1974. He matriculated from Carletonville High School and earned a Honours degree in Political Sciences from the North West University - Potchefstroom Campus. He is currently busy with his post-graduate studies at the University of the Witwatersrand. After university, Du Plessis wanted to join foreign affairs, national intelligence or military intelligence but decided to become involved in party politics.

== Political career ==
At the age of 16, Du Plessis decided that he wanted to be a politician. In 1995, he met Democratic Party leader Tony Leon in Potchefstroom. Du Plessis then joined the Democratic Party at the age of 24 in 1998 and became the chairperson of the party's Carletonville branch. The Democratic Alliance was formed out of a merger of the old DP, the New National Party and the much smaller Federal Alliance in 2000. Du Plessis later became the DA ward councillor for ward 6 in the Randfontein Local Municipality. He stood for Parliament in 2014 as a candidate on the DA lists, but he was not elected.

In 2015 Du Plessis was elected as the regional chairperson of the DA's West Rand Region in Gauteng. He stood for Parliament again in 2019 and was placed higher on the DA's lists. He was elected as a DA MP in the National Assembly, however, he was not available to take up the seat and the DA gave his seat to Adrian Roos from Pretoria.

In 2020, he stood down as the DA's West Rand regional chair and the DA deputy chief whip in the National Assembly, Jacques Julius, who is also from Randfontein, was elected to succeed him.

On 11 March 2021, Du Plessis was sworn in as a DA member of the Gauteng Provincial Legislature.

== Personal life ==
Du Plessis is married to Yolande Thiart du Plessis. They have two children. Du Plessis and his family live in Randfontein.
