= Moleboheng Modise =

South African politician

Moleboheng Modise MP

Member of the National Assembly of South Africa
- Incumbent
- Assumed office 22 May 2019

Personal details
- Party: African National Congress
- Occupation: Member of Parliament
- Profession: Politician

Moleboheng Modise is a South African politician who has served as a Member of the National Assembly since May 2019. She is a member of the African National Congress.

== Parliamentary career ==
In May 2019, Modise was elected to the National Assembly as a member of the African National Congress. She received her committee assignments on 27 June 2019.

=== Committee assignments ===
- Joint Standing Committee on Defence
- Portfolio Committee on Defence and Military Veterans
