= Hendrik Schmidt =

South African politician

Hendrik Schmidt MP
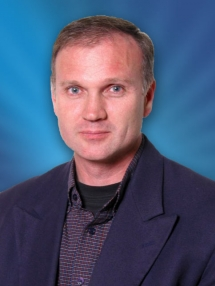

Shadow Deputy Minister of Mining
- In office 2004–2019
- Leader: Tony Leon and Helen Zille

Member of Parliament for Emfuleni South, Gauteng
- Incumbent
- Assumed office 2004

Personal details
- Born: Klerksdorp
- Party: Democratic Alliance
- Education: University of South Africa and University of Johannesburg
- Profession: Advocate

Hendrik Schmidt is a South African politician, a Member of Parliament with the Democratic Alliance, and the Shadow Deputy Minister of Mining.

== Background ==
Schmidt was born in Klerksdorp, South Africa in 1963. He attended schools in Durban, Welkom and Virginia.

== Education ==
He holds several law degrees, including a B. Iuri., an LLB from Unisa, an LLM from Rand Afrikaans University / University of Johannesburg, a Masters in Philosophy (UJ) and a PhD in mining law (UCT). He has worked for the Department of Justice in the district and regional court as a Public Prosecutor and then as a State Advocate and Senior State Advocate. From 1994 to 1999, he was an advocate for the Witwatersrand Local Division and has been a member of the Society of Advocates of South Africa since 1994.

== Political life ==
Schmidt began his political career as a councillor in the Northern Metropolitan Council and went on to become an MP in 1999. He held the position of Democratic Alliance spokesperson on Minerals and Energy from 2004 to 2009, and was instrumental in pursuing and exposing the truth surrounding the Oilgate scandal, involving the African National Congress and Petro-SA. On his re-election to Parliament in 2009, he was appointed as the Shadow Minister of Mining. As a fierce opponent of nationalization of the mining industry in South Africa, he has released many statements to validate his skepticism of the ANC’s ability to do this while turning a profit.

His current constituency is Randwest, which includes Randfontein and Westonaria. It is a community affected by mining activities and, as spokesperson on Mining, Hendrik has provided much assistance with respect to the Mega tailings facilities to be established by Harmony and Mintails in the two different areas.

== Quote ==
Quote: "Expenditure in individual human capital and community development is an investment and not a cost."

== Offices held ==
Political offices
Preceded by ??	Shadow Deputy Minister of Mining; 2004–present	Incumbent
