= Les Labuschagne =

South African politician (born 1941)

Member of the Gauteng Provincial Legislature
- In office 6 May 2009 – 6 May 2014

Member of the National Assembly
- In office 23 April 2004 – May 2009
- Constituency: Gauteng

Personal details
- Born: Leslie Bernardus Labuschagne; 16 November 1941 (age 84)
- Citizenship: South Africa
- Party: Democratic Alliance

Leslie Bernardus Labuschagne (born 16 November 1941) is a retired South African politician. He represented the Democratic Alliance (DA) in the National Assembly from 2004 to 2009 and in the Gauteng Provincial Legislature from 2009 to 2014.

== Early life and career ==
Born on 16 November 1941, Labuschagne is a lawyer by training. He served in the South African foreign service during apartheid.

== Legislative career ==
In the 2004 general election, Labuschagne was elected to a DA seat in the National Assembly, ranked sixth on the party's regional party list for Gauteng. He served as the DA's deputy spokesman on home affairs. He left the National Assembly after the 2009 general election, when he was elected to the Gauteng Provincial Legislature; he served a single term in his provincial seat too, leaving at the 2014 general election.

== Personal life ==
In January 2006, Labuschagne was mugged at gunpoint outside a mall in Mamelodi while sitting in the car with local DA politician Doulien van der Merwe. Van der Merwe was shot.
