= Portfolio Committee on Communications =

Portfolio Committee of the National Assembly of South Africa

The Portfolio Committee on Communications is a portfolio committee of the National Assembly in the Parliament of South Africa. The role of the committee is to oversee the work of the Department of Communications and Digital Technologies and other related public bodies.

Since August 2019, Boyce Maneli of the African National Congress (ANC) has served as the chairperson of the portfolio committee.

== Membership ==
The membership of the committee is as follows:

Member	Party
Boyce Maneli MP (Chairperson)	African National Congress
Princess Faku MP	African National Congress
Thomas Gumbu MP	African National Congress
Nomsa Kubheka MP	African National Congress
Cameron Mackenzie MP	Democratic Alliance
Willie Madisha MP	Congress of the People
Zandile Majozi MP	Inkatha Freedom Party
Zakhele Mbhele MP	Democratic Alliance
Ezekiel Molala MP	African National Congress
Alice Mthembu MP	African National Congress
Vuyani Pambo MP	Economic Freedom Fighters

The following Members of Parliament serve as alternate members:

- Nqabayomzi Kwankwa (United Democratic Movement)
- Mbuyiseni Ndlozi (Economic Freedom Fighters)
- Sheilla Xego (African National Congress)
