= Teliswa Mgweba =

South African politician

Teliswa Mgweba MP

Member of the National Assembly of South Africa
- Incumbent
- Assumed office 22 May 2019

Personal details
- Party: African National Congress
- Occupation: Member of Parliament
- Profession: Politician

Teliswa Mgweba is a South African politician who serves as a Member of Parliament in the National Assembly of South Africa. Mgweba had previously served as the regional secretary of the African National Congress in the party's Ekurhuleni region.

== Education ==
Mgweba holds a national diploma and a certificate in commerce from the Cape Peninsula University of Technology. She received an advanced management diploma in education from the University of Pretoria. At the University of the Witwatersrand, Mgweba fulfilled an advanced management course.

== Career in the ANC ==
Mgweba is a member of the regional executive committee of the African National Congress in the party's Ekurhuleni region. She had previously served as the regional secretary.

During the 11th ANC Gauteng Women's League Provincial Conference held in August 2023, Mgweba was nominated for and contested the position of provincial secretary. She defeated Esther Nhlapho, winning with 376 votes to Nhlapho's 318 votes.

== Parliamentary career ==
Ranked 5th on the ANC's regional-to-national list, Mgweba was elected to the National Assembly of South Africa in the 8 May 2019 election. She was sworn in as an MP on 22 May 2019. Mgweba was given her committee assignments on 27 June 2019.

=== Committee assignments ===
- Committee on Multi-Party Women's Caucus
- Portfolio Committee on Mineral Resources and Energy
- Portfolio Committee on Women, Youth and Persons with Disabilities
- Committee for Section 194 Enquiry
