= Primrose Sonti =

South African politician (born 1961)

Member of the National Assembly of South Africa
- In office 21 May 2014 – 28 May 2024
- Constituency: North West

Personal details
- Born: Nokulunga Primrose Sonti; 1 October 1961 (age 65) Gqaqala, Tsolo, Cape Province
- Party: Economic Freedom Fighters (2013–present)
- Other political affiliations: African National Congress (until 2011)
- Children: 1

Nokulunga Primrose Sonti (born 1 October 1961) is a South African politician from the North West who served as a Member of the National Assembly of South Africa for the Economic Freedom Fighters from May 2014 until May 2024. Sonti was previously a member of the African National Congress.

== Early life and education ==
Nokulunga Primrose Sonti was born on 1 October 1961 in the Gqaqala settlement, Tsolo, in the previous Cape Province. She was the eldest of six children. She was enrolled at the Nqamakwe Jongabantu Secondary School in Nqamakwe but did not finish school. Sonti also has no tertiary education. She was first employed at a shoe factory in Butterworth before she met her husband. They moved to Wonderkop in the North West in 1995.

== Political career ==
Sonti was a leading figure in the African National Congress in Wonderkop until she stood as the ward councillor candidate for the Marikana ward in the 2011 local government election. Due to harassment, she resigned from the ANC.

Sonti was also employed as a clothing contractor in a mine on the outskirts of Mooinooi. In August 2012, the Marikana massacre occurred where 34 Lonmin miners were shot dead by police. She was initially mistaken as one of the widows. She and Thumeka Magwangqana formed a support group for the widows called "Sikhala Sonke" (We cry together). She later resigned from her job. In July 2013, expelled ANC youth league president Julius Malema formed the Economic Freedom Fighters. Sonti was recruited by Malema to join the party. In 2017, she featured in the Strike A Rock documentary, which documented the aftermath of the massacre and the formation of the support group.

=== Parliamentary career ===
Sonti was elected to the National Assembly in May 2014. She took office as an MP on 21 May 2014 and was assigned to serve on the Portfolio Committee on Public Works in June. During a parliamentary debate in March 2015, she referred to President Jacob Zuma as "heartless" and "a thief" and told him to resign for his actions in the Marikana massacre. She was asked to withdraw her statement but refused. In June 2015, she became a member of the Portfolio Committee on Social Development.

After the 2019 general election, Sonti took office for her second term on 22 May 2019. In June 2020, she was appointed to the Portfolio Committee on Women, Youth and Persons with Disabilities.

Sonti was not placed on any EFF candidate list for the 2024 general election and left parliament at the election.

== Personal life ==
Sonti was previously married. She has one daughter and three grandchildren.
