= Gareth van Onselen =

South African political strategist

- Citizenship: South African
- Education: University of the Witwatersrand
- Occupations: Political strategist; pollster; commentator; columnist
- Employer(s): Democratic Alliance (2001–2013); South African Institute of Race Relations (2018–2019); Victory Research (2019–present)
- Parents: Belinda Bozzoli; Charles van Onselen
- Website: inside-politics.org

Gareth van Onselen is a South African political strategist, pollster, and commentator. A former head of communications for the opposition Democratic Alliance, he resigned from the party acrimoniously in 2013. He currently runs Victory Research, a market research company. Until May 2023, he also wrote a regular column in the Business Day.

== Early life and education ==
Van Onselen is one of three children of historian Charles van Onselen and sociologist Belinda Bozzoli. He studied sociology at the University of the Witwatersrand, where he completed a BA in 1998, Honours in 1999, and an MA in 2001.

== Career in the Democratic Alliance ==
For the first 12 years of his career, van Onselen worked in various capacities for the Democratic Alliance (DA), South Africa's largest opposition party. In addition to holding positions in communications and research, he spent a stint as chief of staff to DA leader Tony Leon, who had known his parents. When Leon resigned from his office in 2007, van Onselen opposed Helen Zille's campaign to succeed him. Nonetheless, he went on to serve as the DA's executive director of communications during Zille's subsequent leadership of the party.

He was serving as communications director in early 2011 during a divisive internal contest over the position of DA parliamentary leader, fought between Lindiwe Mazibuko and Athol Trollip. Zille said that van Onselen was "chief among" Mazibuko's supporters and that he worked on Mazibuko's successful internal campaign. Van Onselen's critics inside the DA, including Zille, later claimed that van Onselen's involvement was part of a "vendetta" against Trollip, arising in part from Trollip's earlier skirmishes with van Onselen's friend Ryan Coetzee.

In August 2011, when Jonathan Moakes reshuffled the DA's executive leadership, van Onselen was appointed as executive director for innovation and projects, and Gavin Davis succeeded him as head of communications. He was later appointed as director of political analysis and development. However, in early 2013, he resigned from the party to pursue writing full-time. In Zille's account he left after she refused his request to be appointed as head of parliamentary communications.

== Later career ==
=== Public commentary ===
After leaving the DA, van Onselen redoubled his public commentary, both in a weekly column for the Business Day and in his liberalism-focused blog, Inside Politics. He also worked briefly as a journalist for the Sunday Times. His commentary has often attracted controversy. Calling him both a "sharp and ruthless writer and commentator" and a "melancholy, idealistic misanthrope", the Daily Maverick's Marianne Thamm said of van Onselen, "He is a man seized by an irrepressible drive to impress his thoughts and ideas of the world and the country we live in". Journalist Peter Bruce described him as "a huge and deliciously aggressive intellect". Others criticise him for rigidly promoting a narrow liberalism which neglects social justice; Max du Preez has denigrated him as "the self-styled guardian of DA liberalism" and Pierre de Vos has written blogs criticising both his "self-righteousness" and his "hypocrisy".

==== Alleged pro-DA bias ====
Van Onselen's columns led him into confrontations with the opposition Economic Freedom Fighters, as well as with the governing African National Congress (ANC). ANC-aligned critics tended to question his impartiality due to his association with the DA: he was accused of continuing to pursue the DA's "insatiable anti-ANC obsession" and of being a partisan "masquerading as a journalist". In November 2018, journalist Max du Preez likewise accused van Onselen of circulating anti-ANC "propaganda".

==== Alleged factional bias ====
Quite contrarily, prominent figures inside the DA accused van Onselen of an anti-DA bias, which they said originated in resentment related to his acrimonious departure from the party. These accusations emerged primarily in response to van Onselen's sustained public criticism of Mmusi Maimane, who at the time was Zille's heir-apparent as DA federal leader. Perhaps most famously, in 2013 van Onselen wrote one column which attacked Maimane for his "illiberal" views on African identity, and another which compared Maimane to the protagonists of the T. S. Eliot's The Hollow Men. In 2014 the DA, accusing him of becoming his own party's harshest public critic, described van Onselen as "pushing the same factional agenda" that he had pushed inside the DA and that had resulted in his resignation from the party. During the same period, responding to the ANC's complaints that van Onselen was a DA media plant, Zille Tweeted that van Onselen was in fact "a proxy for a faction in the DA".

Zille claimed that van Onselen had "turned his guns" on Maimane in defence of Lindiwe Mazibuko, who was expected to be Maimane's main opponent in the leadership race. When Mazibuko resigned from the DA in May 2014, van Onselen published an article in the Sunday Times entitled "The real reasons Mazibuko left the DA parliamentary leadership", which described Zille as a "dominant and authoritarian personality" and claimed that Mazibuko had been "viciously and brutally maligned and alienated" by Zille's supporters in the party. This led to another series of ripostes in the media, culminating in a particularly hostile op-ed by Davis, who accused van Onselen of having been an unprofessional and divisive communications director and described him as "an embittered former party hack". In the aftermath of the saga, Rian Malan wrote to the Business Day suggesting that the newspaper should provide a clear account of van Onselen's history and agenda with respect to the DA.

=== Institute of Race Relations ===
On 22 January 2018, van Onselen joined the South African Institute of Race Relations (SAIRR) as head of politics and governance, in which capacity he oversaw SAIRR's political analysis and commentary on current affairs. By August 2018, News24 reported that there were "fears" that the SAIRR had gained "unhealthy influence over DA policies", in part because van Onselen remained close to members of the so-called liberal faction of the DA.

Van Onselen led SAIRR's voter opinion polling ahead of the May 2019 general election. However, he left SAIRR later in 2019, and, in October that year, he published a column entitled "How the DA and IRR are creating a race war". it contained scathing criticism of SAIRR's new "Save the Opposition" campaign, which van Onselen described as a thinly veiled attempt "to influence the DA".

=== Victory Research ===
In 2019, van Onselen became chief executive officer at Victory Research, a market research consultancy founded by DA staffer Johan van der Berg.

The firm rose to prominence in the run-up to the May 2024 general election, when van Onselen's team at Victory was commissioned to conduct opinion polling for the Social Research Foundation, a think-tank led by former SAIRR head Frans Cronje. Critics, led by ActionSA and its chairperson Michael Beaumont, questioned the credibility of Victory's polls, arguing that the company had a conflict of interest in virtue not only of van Onselen's history with the DA but also of the fact that van der Berg, Victory's managing partner, remained the DA's head of research. Van Onselen dismissed the allegations in an interview with the Financial Mail, saying that van der Berg had no role in Victory's daily operations. In the aftermath of the election, his polling was hailed for its accuracy.

== Personal life ==
In February 2020, Daily Maverick editor Ferial Haffajee suggested on Twitter that van Onselen's impartiality was compromised because Gwen Ngwenya, the DA's head of policy, was his "partner". Van Onselen did not respond to the claim.

== Bibliography ==
- Onselen, Gareth van (2014). Clever Blacks, Jesus and Nkandla: The Real Jacob Zuma in His Own Words. Jonathan Ball. ISBN 978-1-86842-618-8.
- Onselen, Gareth van (2015). Holy Cows: The Ambiguities of Being South African. Tafelberg. ISBN 978-0-624-06620-0.
