= Lerato Ngobeni =

South African politician

Lerato Ngobeni MP

Member of the National Assembly of South Africa
- Incumbent
- Assumed office 14 June 2024

Personal details
- Party: ActionSA
- Education: Johnson C. Smith University (BA)
- Profession: Politician

Lerato Mikateko Ngobeni is a South African politician who was elected to the National Assembly of South Africa in the 2024 general election as a member of ActionSA. She had previously served as a City of Johannesburg councillor.

== Background ==
Nogbeni has worked as a program manager and a sustainability specialist. She coordinated the Rustenburg area's readiness for the 2010 FIFA World Cup. She also edited The Royal Bafokeng 2010 FIFA World Cup Journey book.

In 2015, Ngobeni graduated summa cum laude from the Johnson C. Smith University with a Bachelor of Arts in Political Science. Before becoming involved in politics, she was a programme manager at Harvard University's Centre for African Studies.

Ngobeni joined ActionSA and was appointed as the party's national spokesperson. She was elected an ActionSA councillor in the City of Johannesburg in the 2021 local government elections and became chairperson of the council's environment and infrastructure services committee shortly afterwards.

== Parliamentary career ==
Ngobeni was elected to the National Assembly of South Africa in the 2024 general election. She was named chief whip of the party's parliamentary caucus.

In March 2025, Ngobeni urged the Minister of Home Affairs Leon Schreiber to reject Cape Independence Advocacy Group co-founder Phil Craig's citizenship application over his support for the Western Cape to secede from South Africa. The following month, she criticised the South African government's efforts to force the relocation of the Taiwanese Liaison Office from Pretoria to Johannesburg.
