= Mgcini Tshwaku =

South African politician (born 1976)

Councillor Mgcini Tshwaku PhD
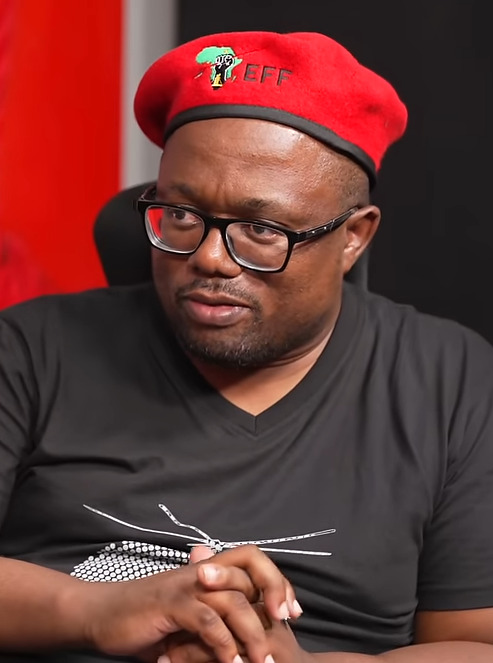
- Tshwaku in 2023

Member of the National Assembly of South Africa
- In office 14 November 2017 – 9 February 2023
- Preceded by: Shadrack Tlhaole

Member of the Gauteng Provincial Legislature
- In office 21 May 2014 – 2017

Personal details
- Born: Mgcini Tshwaku; 7 June 1976 (age 50)
- Party: Economic Freedom Fighters
- Education: University of Fort Hare (BSc); University of Cape Town (BSc, MSc)
- Profession: Politician

Mgcini Tshwaku (born 7 June 1976) is a South African politician and member of the Economic Freedom Fighters (EFF) who has served as the City of Johannesburg's Member of the Mayoral Committee (MMC) for Safety and Security since 2023. Prior to serving as Johannesburg city council, he was a Member of the Gauteng Provincial Legislature between 2014 and 2017 and a Member of the National Assembly of South Africa from 2017 until 2023.

== Education ==
Tshwaku holds a Bachelor of Science (BSc) in Applied Maths, Physics and Chemistry from the University of Fort Hare, a Bachelor of Science (BSc) and a Master of Science (MSc) in Chemical Engineering from the University of Cape Town. Tshwaku holds a PhD degree in chemical engineering from the University of South Africa.

== Political career ==
Tshwaku was the convenor of the Economic Freedom Fighters in Gauteng from 2013 to 2014. In 2014 he was elected as a Member of the Gauteng Provincial Legislature.

In 2017 he resigned from the provincial legislature. He was sworn in as a member of the National Assembly on 14 November 2017, replacing Shadrack Tlhaole. Tshwaku was then named to the Portfolio Committee on Basic Education and the Portfolio Committee on Monitoring and Evaluation. In 2018, he was elected to the EFF's Central Command Team and War Council.

Tshwaku was re-elected to the National Assembly in 2019. He served as an alternate member of the National Assembly's Portfolio Committee on Public Works and Infrastructure, where he served from 27 June 2019 until 9 February 2023 and was Member at Portfolio Committee On Trade, Industry and Competition from 14 April 2022 until 9 February 2023.

On 9 February 2023, Tshwaku resigned from Parliament and was sworn in as a City of Johannesburg councillor for the EFF. He was then appointed as the Member of the Mayoral Committee for Safety and Security.
