= Annah Gela =

South African politician

Member of the National Assembly of South Africa
- In office 22 May 2019 – 28 May 2024

Personal details
- Party: African National Congress

Annah Gela is a South African politician of the African National Congress (ANC) who had been a Member of the National Assembly of South Africa from 2019 until 2024.

== Background ==
Gela completed a municipal management development programme at the University of Pretoria. She also fulfilled a community facilitation programme through the Siyakhula Trust.

A member of the African National Congress, she served as its chief whip in the Westonaria Local Municipality from 2008 until 2016.

At the provincial African National Congress Women's League conference held in August 2023, Gela was narrowly elected deputy provincial secretary over Sylvia Mcungeli.

== Parliamentary career ==
Prior to the 8 May 2019 general election, she was given the 22nd position on the ANC's Gauteng list of candidates for the National Assembly. She was elected to parliament at the election, and was sworn in as a Member of Parliament on 22 May 2019.

In parliament, she served on the Portfolio Committee on Health.
