= Alfred Tseki =

South African politician

Member of the National Assembly of South Africa
- In office 22 May 2019 – 28 May 2024

Member of the Gauteng Provincial Legislature
- In office 21 May 2014 – 7 May 2019

Personal details
- Born: Mohatla Alfred Tseki; 24 December 1964 (age 61)
- Party: African National Congress
- Occupation: Politician

Mohatla Alfred Tseki (born 24 December 1964) is a South African politician who served as a Member of the National Assembly of South Africa from 2019 until 2024. Prior to his election to parliament, Tseki served as a Member of the Gauteng Provincial Legislature from 2014 to 2019. He is a member of the African National Congress.

== Political career ==
Tseki was ranked 33rd on the ANC' list of candidates for the Gauteng Provincial Legislature in the 2014 election. He was elected to the provincial legislature as the ANC won 40 seats. Tseki served as chair of the Cooperative Governance and Traditional Affairs Portfolio Committee in the 5th Legislature (2014–2019).

In 2019 Tseki stood for election to the South African National Assembly as the 23rd candidate on the ANC's regional to national list. At the election, he won a seat in parliament. Upon election, he became a member of the Portfolio Committee on Human Settlements, Water and Sanitation. He did not stand in the 2024 general election and left parliament.
