= Jaco Mulder =

South African politician

Member of the Gauteng Provincial Legislature
- Incumbent
- Assumed office TBD
- In office 2004–2014

Member of the National Assembly of South Africa
- In office 22 May 2019 – 28 May 2024

Personal details
- Born: Frederik Jacobus Mulder; 15 January 1964 (age 62) South Africa
- Party: Freedom Front Plus
- Committees: Portfolio Committee on Trade and Industry

Frederik Jacobus Mulder (born 15 January 1964), known as Jaco Mulder, is a South African politician who is an incoming member of the Gauteng Provincial Legislature. He previously served in the provincial legislature between 2004 and 2014. A member of the Freedom Front Plus (FF+), Mulder served as a member of the National Assembly of South Africa between 2019 and 2024.
