= Dorothy Mabiletsa =

South African politician

Member of Parliament from Gauteng
- In office 22 May 2019 – 28 May 2024

Personal details
- Party: ANC

Maidi Dorothy Mabiletsa is a South African politician who served as a Member of Parliament (MP) for the African National Congress.

Mabiletsa left parliament at the 2024 election.
