= Doreen Nxumalo =

South African politician (born 1949)

Member of the National Assembly
- In office 23 April 2004 – 6 May 2014
- Constituency: Gauteng

Personal details
- Born: 16 August 1949 (age 76)
- Citizenship: South Africa
- Party: African National Congress

Muntu Doreen Nxumalo (born 16 August 1949) is a South African politician who represented the African National Congress (ANC) in the National Assembly from 2004 to 2014. She served two terms, gaining election in 2004 and re-election in 2009. She represented the Gauteng constituency and in 2009 was appointed as the ANC's whip in the Portfolio Committee on Arts and Culture.
