= Ntokozo Hlonyana =

South African politician

Member of the National Assembly of South Africa
- In office 23 January 2018 – 8 January 2025

Personal details
- Party: Economic Freedom Fighters
- Education: Durban University of Technology; University of Pretoria

Ntokozo Khonziwe Fortunate Hlonyana is a South African politician who served as a Member of the National Assembly of South Africa from 23 January 2018 until 8 January 2025. She is a member of the Economic Freedom Fighters party.

== Biography ==
Hlonyana has a national diploma in sports management from the Durban University of Technology and a governance certificate from the University of Pretoria. She joined the EFF in 2013. She was a member of a branch command team and served as a coordinator of a sub-region. Hlonyana was also an organiser of the party's provincial command team in Gauteng. In 2018, she was convener of the EFF's Chris Hani Region. Prior to that, she was the Alfred Nzo regional coordinator. In 2019, she was elected to the EFF's central command team as an additional member.

During her first term as an MP, she served on both the higher education and training and economic development portfolio committees. She was elected to a full term in the 2019 general election. Thereafter, she was appointed a member of the Portfolio Committee on Women, Youth and People with Disabilities.

Hlonyana was re-elected in the 2024 general election. She was then appointed a member of the Standing Committee on Appropriations and an alternate member of the Standing Committee on Auditor General. She resigned from parliament on 8 January 2025.
