= Oscar Mathafa =

South African politician

Oscar Mathafa MP

Member of the National Assembly of South Africa
- Incumbent
- Assumed office 22 May 2019

Personal details
- Born: Oscar Masarona Mathafa
- Party: African National Congress
- Occupation: Member of Parliament
- Profession: Politician

Oscar Masarona Mathafa is a South African politician of the African National Congress who has been serving as a Member of the National Assembly of South Africa since May 2019.

== Parliamentary career ==
Mathafa is a member of the African National Congress. Prior to the general election on 8 May 2019, he was placed eleventh on the party's regional Gauteng election list. After the election, he was nominated to the National Assembly of South Africa. He was sworn in as a Member of Parliament on 22 May 2019. Mathafa was given his committee assignments on 27 June 2019.

Mathafa was reelected in the 2024 general election.

=== Committee assignments ===
- Standing Committee on Auditor-General
- Standing Committee on Appropriations
