= Simphiwe Mbatha =

South African politician

Member of the National Assembly of South Africa
- In office 22 May 2019 – 28 May 2024

Personal details
- Party: African National Congress
- Occupation: Member of Parliament
- Profession: Politician

Simphiwe Gcwele Nomvula Mbatha is a South African politician who was a Member of the National Assembly for the African National Congress from May 2019 until May 2024.

== Parliamentary career ==
Mbatha is a member of the African National Congress. Prior to the 8 May 2019 general election, Mbatha was placed ninth on the party's regional Gauteng list. After the election, she was nominated to the National Assembly of South Africa. She took office on 22 May 2019. She was given her committee assignments on 27 June 2019.

Mbatha did not stand for re-election in the 2024 general election.

=== Committee memberships ===
- Portfolio Committee on Agriculture, Land Reform and Rural Development (Alternate Member)
- Portfolio Committee on Environment, Forestry and Fisheries

== Personal life ==
In July 2020, Mbatha tested positive for COVID-19.
