= Patrick Sindane =

South African politician

Member of the National Assembly of South Africa
- In office 22 May 2019 – 8 December 2021

Member of the Gauteng Provincial Legislature
- In office 21 May 2014 – 7 May 2019

Personal details
- Born: Patrick Sindane
- Party: Economic Freedom Fighters
- Profession: Politician

Patrick Sindane is a South African politician. A member of the Economic Freedom Fighters, he was elected to the Gauteng Provincial Legislature in 2014.

After the 2019 general election, Sindane became a member of the National Assembly of South Africa. He was an alternate member of the Portfolio Committee on Agriculture, Land Reform and Rural Development.

Sindane resigned from the National Assembly on 8 December 2021.
