= Mathew Cuthbert =

South African politician

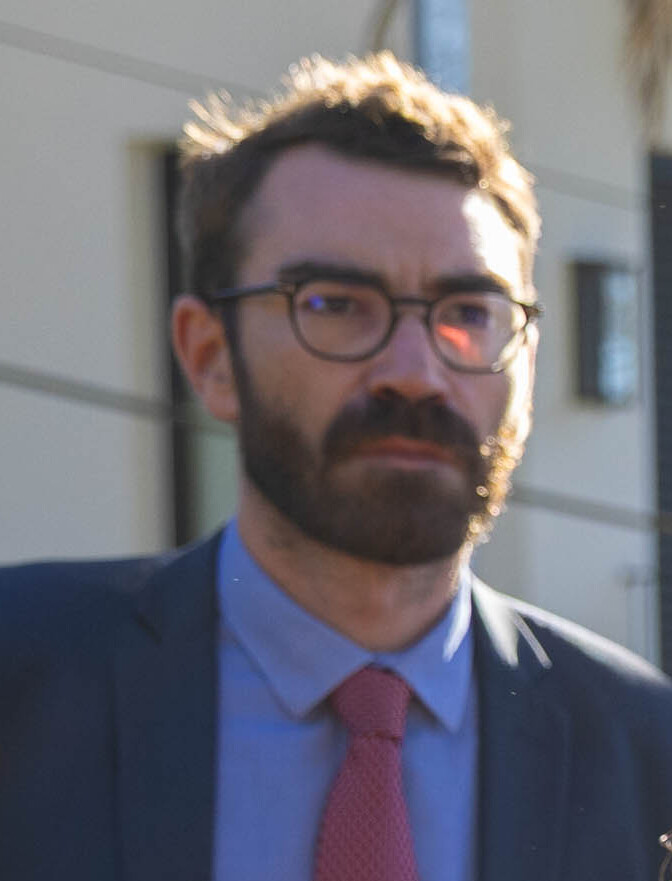
- Cuthbert in 2025

Shadow Deputy Minister of Trade and Industry
- In office 5 June 2019 – 21 April 2023
- Leader: John Steenhuisen; Mmusi Maimane
- Succeeded by: Darren Bergman

Member of the National Assembly of South Africa
- In office 22 May 2019 – 29 June 2026

Personal details
- Born: Mathew John Cuthbert; 21 September 1993 (age 32)
- Party: Democratic Alliance
- Profession: Politician

Mathew John Cuthbert (born 21 September 1993) is a South African politician who served as the Shadow Deputy Minister of Trade and Industry from June 2019 until April 2023. A member of the Democratic Alliance, he was elected to the National Assembly in May 2019. Before that, Cuthbert served as a councillor in the Ekurhuleni Metropolitan Municipality.

Cuthbert resigned from Parliament in June 2026 to become the DA's chief executive officer.

== Education ==
Cuthbert obtained a master's degree in governance and policy development from the University of the Witwatersrand and holds other post-graduate qualifications.

== Political career ==
Cuthbert is a member of the Democratic Alliance. He served as a councillor and as the shadow mayoral committee member for economic development in the Ekurhuleni Metropolitan Municipality until his election to Parliament.

In March 2019, the Democratic Alliance announced their parliamentary candidates for the general election on 8 May. Cuthbert was placed 60th on the party's national list and 15th on the party's Gauteng regional list. After the election, he was announced as an incoming parliamentarian. He was sworn in on 22 May 2019. On 5 June 2019, the DA parliamentary leader, Mmusi Maimane, selected him to be the Shadow Deputy Minister of Trade and Industry. Cuthbert became a member of the Portfolio Committee on Trade and Industry on 27 June.

In 2020, Cuthbert supported Helen Zille's bid to be re-elected as chairperson of the DA's Federal Council, the party's second highest-decision making body. He also supported interim leader John Steenhuisen's leadership campaign. After Steenhuisen was elected leader for a full term, he kept Cuthbert in the Shadow Cabinet as Shadow Deputy Minister of Trade and Industry.

On 21 April 2023, Cuthbert was appointed the DA's Head of Policy following Gwen Ngwenya's departure to lead Airbnb's policy and legislative activities in the Middle East and Africa. Darren Bergman succeeded him as Shadow Deputy Minister of Trade, Industry and Competition.

Cuthbert resigned from Parliament in June 2026 to become the DA's chief executive officer.

== Personal life ==
Cuthbert is a cousin of AfriForum president Kallie Kriel. In an interview in May 2018, Kriel said that apartheid was not a crime against humanity. Cuthbert called his comment "disgusting".
