= Pebane Moteka =

South African politician

Member of the South African National Assembly
- In office 21 May 2014 – 31 July 2022

Personal details
- Born: Pebane George Moteka
- Party: ActionSA (2023–present)
- Other political affiliations: Economic Freedom Fighters (Until 2023)
- Profession: Politician

Pebane George Moteka is a South African politician who was elected to the National Assembly at the 2014 general election as a representative of the Economic Freedom Fighters (EFF). He was re-elected to parliament in 2019. He resigned from parliament on 31 July 2022.

Moteka was a member of the Central Command Team of the EFF, the party's highest decision-making structure.

In November 2023, Moteka resigned from the EFF and joined ActionSA. He cited the EFF's open border policy as the reason for his resignation from the party.

He joined ActionSA's structures in Limpopo, where party leader Herman Mashaba said ActionSA looked forward to working with him to grow its support in the province.
