= Marta Wenger =

South African politician

Marta Wenger MP

Shadow Minister of Water and Environmental Affairs
- In office 2012–2014
- Leader: Helen Zille
- Preceded by: Gareth Morgan

Personal details
- Party: Democratic Alliance

Marta Wenger (born 18 July 1953) is a South African politician, currently a Member of Parliament with the Democratic Alliance. She was previously the mayor of Midvaal in Gauteng, and served as the Shadow Minister of Water and Environmental Affairs from 2012 to 2014.
