= Belinda Bozzoli =

South African author, academic, sociologist, and politician (1945–2020)

Shadow Minister of Higher Education, Science and Technology
- In office 5 June 2019 – 5 December 2020
- Leader: John Steenhuisen; Mmusi Maimane
- Preceded by: Position established
- Succeeded by: Chantel King

Shadow Minister of Higher Education and Training
- In office 5 June 2014 – 5 June 2019
- Leader: Mmusi Maimane
- Preceded by: Annelie Lotriet
- Succeeded by: Position dissolved

Member of the National Assembly of South Africa
- In office 21 May 2014 – 5 December 2020

Personal details
- Born: 17 December 1945 Johannesburg, South Africa
- Died: 5 December 2020 (aged 74)
- Party: Democratic Alliance
- Spouse: Charles van Onselen
- Children: 3, including Gareth van Onselen
- Education: University of the Witwatersrand; University of Sussex

Belinda Bozzoli (17 December 1945 – 5 December 2020) was a South African author, academic, sociologist, and politician. She was deputy vice-chancellor of the University of the Witwatersrand for a period from 2002, having headed its school of social sciences. In 2014 Bozzoli was elected a member of the South African parliament for the Democratic Alliance. From 2019 she served as Shadow Minister of Higher Education, Science and Technology.

== Early life and education ==
Bozzoli was born on 17 December 1945 in Johannesburg to Guerino Renzo and Cora Bertha Bozzoli, both Italian South Africans. She earned her Bachelor of Arts and Honours degrees from the University of the Witwatersrand and then obtained her Master of Arts and Doctor of Philosophy at the University of Sussex. Bozzoli was an Associate Fellow at Yale University between 1978 and 1979.

== Academic career ==
Bozzoli authored three single-authored, internationally published books and was the editor or co-editor of a further four. She had, in total, published 26 articles.

Bozzoli became head of sociology at the University of the Witwatersrand in the late 1990s and was head of the School of Social Sciences from 2001 to 2003. She became Deputy Vice-Chancellor in 2002 and chaired the Board of the National Research Foundation for a time. She was awarded an A-rating from the National Research Foundation in 2006. Bozzoli was the first sociologist to be honoured in this way. Bozzoli also served as the acting director of the Wits Institute for Social and Economic Research.

== Political career ==
In 2014, Bozzoli stood for election to the South African National Assembly as 77th on the Democratic Alliance's (DA) national list. At the election, Bozzoli won a seat in the National Assembly. Upon election, she became the Shadow Minister of Higher Education and Training. She was a member of the Portfolio Committee on Higher Education and Training and the DA's contact for Boksburg West constituency during the 2014–19 parliament. In October 2016 she criticised the African National Congress Party's universities policy which she said had seen government funding fall from 50% to 40% of university income since 1994 and led to budget shortfalls, larger class sizes and increased fees.

Bozzoli was re-elected to Parliament in 2019. Bozzoli was then made Shadow Minister for the newly created Higher Education, Science and Technology portfolio. In June 2020 she raised concerns over the South African government's move to write off 1.96 billion rand of student debt. Bozzoli stated that the DA had no objection to the debts of low-income students being forgiven, but queried whether the move would benefit high-earning students who were simply unwilling to pay back loans. She was also concerned about the impact on funding for universities.

== Death ==
Bozzoli died of cancer on 5 December 2020, twelve days before her 75th birthday. She was survived by her husband, Charles van Onselen, and their three children. She had continued to work in politics during her final illness.

== Publications ==
- The Political Nature of a Ruling Class: Capital and Ideology in South Affica 1890-1933. London: Routledge & Kegan Paul, 1981.
- Theatres of Struggle and the End of Apartheid. Edinburgh: Edinburgh University Press for the International African Institute, London, 2004.

== See also ==
- List of members of the National Assembly of South Africa who died in office
