= Heinrich April =

South African politician

Member of the National Assembly of South Africa
- In office 22 May 2019 – 28 May 2024

Personal details
- Born: Heinrich Giovanni April; 9 April 1980 (age 46)
- Party: African National Congress
- Profession: Politician

Heinrich Giovanni April (born 9 April 1980) is a South African politician who served as a Member of the National Assembly from 2019 until 2024. April is a member of the African National Congress.

== Political career ==
April is a member of the African National Congress. He served as the chairperson of the party's Paul Plaatjies branch, as well as the chairperson of the party's youth league in the Bavumile Vilakazi region. He was also the treasurer of the Ekurhuleni region and a member of a sub-committee.

== Parliamentary career ==
April was sworn in as a Member of Parliament on 22 May 2019 following the 2019 general election. He was given his committee assignments on 27 June 2019.

April did not stand for re-election to Parliament in the 2024 general election.

=== Committee assignments ===
- Portfolio Committee on Small Business Development
- Portfolio Committee on Tourism
