= Adrian Roos =

South African politician

Adrian Roos MP

Shadow Deputy Minister of Home Affairs
- In office February 2020 – 14 June 2024
- Leader: John Steenhuisen
- Preceded by: Angel Khanyile
- Succeeded by: Office vacant

Member of the National Assembly of South Africa
- Incumbent
- Assumed office 22 May 2019

Personal details
- Born: Adrian Christopher Roos
- Party: Democratic Alliance
- Profession: Politician
- Committees: Portfolio Committee on Home Affairs

Adrian Christopher Roos is a South African politician and a Member of Parliament in the National Assembly for the Democratic Alliance party. Within the DA's Shadow cabinet, he served as Deputy Shadow Minister of Home Affairs from 2020 until 2024.

== Background ==
Roos holds LLB and BSc degrees and is an admitted advocate of the North Gauteng High Court. He is a former national chairperson of the Geoinformatics Society of South Africa. During his time as a Democratic Alliance PR councillor in the City of Tshwane Metropolitan Municipality, he was a member of the municipal public accounts, finance, economic development, transport and environment committees. Roos was also elected to the regional executive of the DA in Gauteng North.

== Parliamentary career ==
Roos was placed 25th on the DA's Gauteng regional list and 83rd on the party's national list for the 8 May 2019 National Assembly election. At the election, he won a seat in the National Assembly. Roos was sworn in as a Member of Parliament on 22 May, two weeks after the election. On 27 June 2019, he became an alternate member of the Portfolio Committee on Home Affairs. He became a full member of the committee on 7 February 2020 and was appointed Shadow Deputy Minister of Home Affairs.

On 5 December 2020, Roos was reappointed as Shadow Deputy Minister of Home Affairs by John Steenhuisen.

Roos criticised the electoral amendment bill that would allow for individuals to stand for election to parliament and provincial legislatures as independent candidates after it was passed by the National Assembly in October 2022, arguing that the bill discriminates against independent candidates because it consigns them to contesting only the regional lists by treating provinces as constituencies, but bars them from standing as candidates on the national proportional representation list.

Having been re-elected to the National Assembly in the 2024 general election, Roos was elected to serve on the Magistrates Commission.
