= 2018 South African presidential election =

Election in South Africa

- 15 February 2018
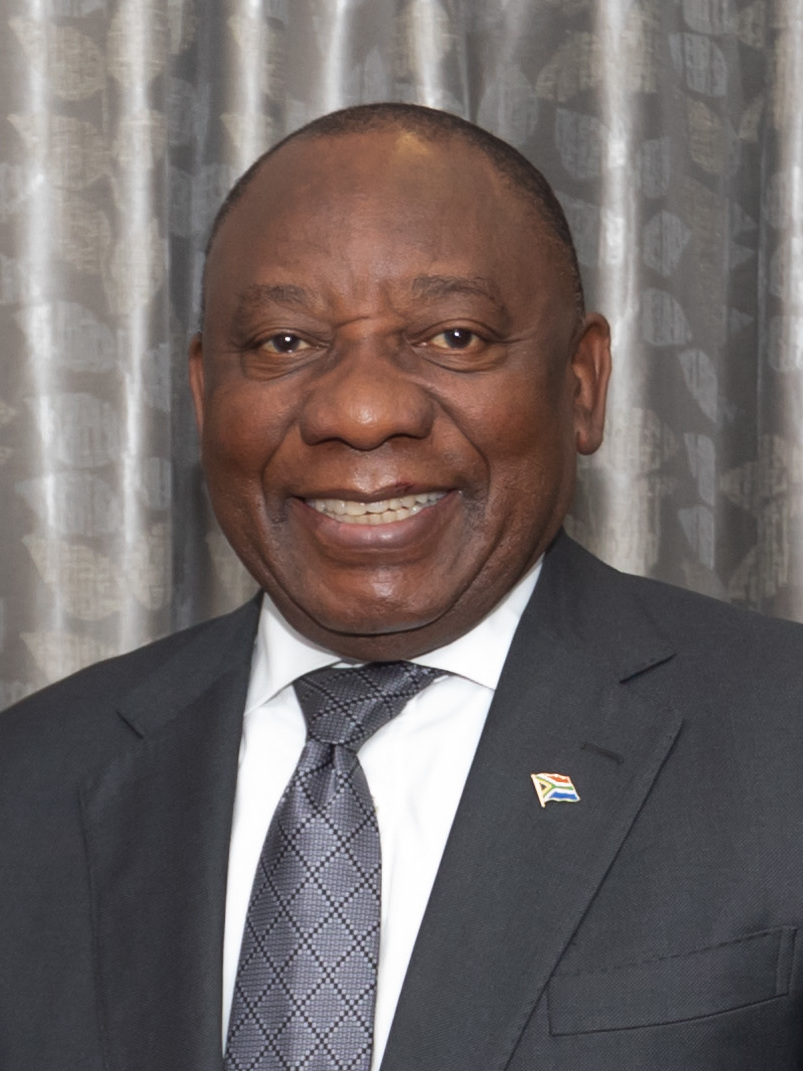
Nominee	Cyril Ramaphosa
Party	ANC
Electoral vote	Unopposed
President before election
Jacob Zuma
Cyril Ramaphosa (acting) (Note: Ramaphosa became Acting President following Zuma's resignation the day before this election.)
ANC
Elected President
Cyril Ramaphosa
ANC

A presidential election was held in the National Assembly in South Africa on 15 February 2018 following the resignation of Jacob Zuma on 14 February. Acting president Cyril Ramaphosa of the ruling African National Congress won the election unopposed due to no other party nominating a candidate. Ramaphosa was sworn in by Chief Justice Mogoeng Mogoeng at 5pm, 15 February 2018.

== Background ==
Following the announcement of the resignation of President Jacob Zuma late on 14 February 2018, and official receipt of a letter of resignation by the Speaker of Parliament during the morning of 15 February, Parliament was convened to elect a new president.

The President of South Africa is elected by the members of the National Assembly, the lower house of Parliament. The upper house, the National Council of Provinces, does not participate in the election.

In a press conference before the session, Julius Malema, leader of the Economic Freedom Fighters (EFF) announced that his party will not participate in the election.

== Election ==
Shortly after the start of the sitting of Parliament the EFF objected to the legitimacy of the process, stating that parliament should be dissolved and a general election called. All members of the EFF then walked out.

The Chief Justice of the Constitutional Court, Mogoeng Mogoeng presided over the election. He began proceedings by reading Zuma's letter of resignation. Parties traditionally nominate their respective leaders as candidates. Cyril Ramaphosa, leader of the African National Congress and Acting President since Zuma's resignation, was the only nominee. Thus there was no ballot and Ramaphosa was declared duly elected.

== Responses ==
- Mosiuoa Lekota, leader of the Congress of the People party objected to the nomination of Ramaphosa, and said his party will take the issue to the Constitutional Court.
- Mmusi Maimane, leader of the Democratic Alliance, congratulated President Ramaphosa, but reminded the house of their motion to dissolve Parliament and call for an early general election.

== Oath of Office ==
In a brief ceremony at Tuynhuys, the office of the Presidency in Cape Town, President Elect Ramaphosa was sworn in as the fifth post-apartheid President of South Africa, shortly after 17:00 SAST (15:00 UTC) on 15 February by the Chief Justice of the Constitutional Court.
