= Pretoria North High School =

Hoërskool Pretoria-Noord

Location
- Corner of Eeufees Street and Berg Avenue; Pretoria, Gauteng; South Africa
- Coordinates: 25.685102°S 28.16881°E

Information
- School type: Public school
- Motto: Voor in die wapad brand 'n lig (Translated: There at the end of the wagon trial is a light)
- Established: 1951; 75 years ago
- School district: District 9
- Principal: C J C (Neels) Driecher
- Grades: 8–12
- Gender: Boys and girls
- Age: 14 to 18
- Language: Afrikaans
- Schedule: 07:30 - 14:00
- Hours in school day: 6h30
- Campus: Urban campus
- Campus type: Suburban
- Colours: Turquoise, white and black
- Accreditation: Gauteng Department of Education
- Website: www.pnhs.co.za

Pretoria North High School (Afrikaans: Hoërskool Pretoria-Noord) is a public funded government high school in Pretoria North, a suburb of Pretoria, Gauteng, South Africa.

== History of Schools in Pretoria North ==
The first school in the area was established in 1890 by Theodore Erasmus at his farm "Wesfontein". In 1895 Jan Booysen established a school on the east side of the Apies River in Pretoria. Since 1904 the English Anglican Church in General Beyers Street has been used as a school. The first classrooms of the Pretoria North Parallel Medium School (Primary Danie Malan today) were founded on 20 May 1909.

== Pretoria North High School founded ==
On January 19, 1943, the Junior Hoërskool Pretoria-Noord seceded from Pretoria North Parallel and the standard six to eight students went over to House Zealand. The construction of the school started in 1944 and was completed in 1946. Pretoria North High School was officially founded in 1951.

== Language and gender ==
The school caters for both sexes, and is an Afrikaans medium school.

== Alumni ==
- Carl Martin (Kallie) Kriel (born 14 September 1969) - Head of civic organization Afriforum
