= Petros Sithole =

South African politician

Khethamabala Petros Sithole was a South African member of the National Assembly of South Africa from the Inkatha Freedom Party. He was first elected at the 2009 South African general election and served until his death on 31 May 2025.
