= Duma Nkosi =

South African politician (1957–2021)

Duma Moses Nkosi (6 July 1957 – 16 December 2021) was a South African politician who was the mayor of the Ekurhuleni Metropolitan Municipality from 2001 to 2008, succeeded by Ntombi Mekgwe. He also served as a member of the National Assembly of South Africa from Gauteng from 1994 to 2001 and again from 2019 till his death in 2021.

In 1998, Nkosi was called before the TRC to gain amnesty concerning his role as chair of the local ANC in Thokoza (1990–1996) whose members had participated in the 22 February 1990 murder of a number of people.

Nkosi died on 16 December 2021, at the age of 64.
