= Colombia–South Africa relations =

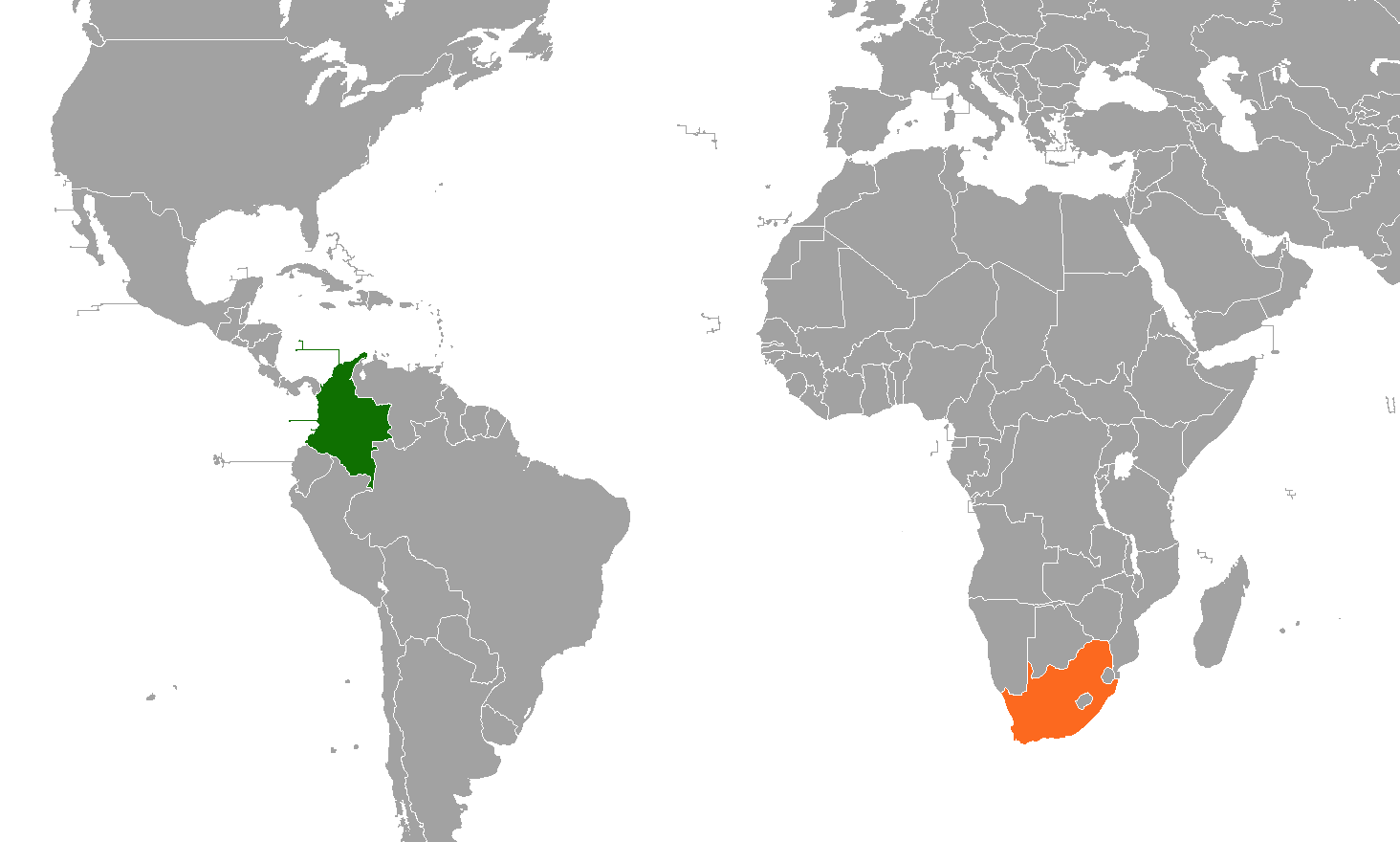
- Colombia: South Africa

Diplomatic mission
- Embassy of Colombia in Pretoria: Embassy of South Africa in Caracas

Colombia–South Africa relations are the bilateral relations between Colombia and South Africa. Colombia has an embassy in Pretoria, while South Africa is accredited to Colombia through its embassy in Caracas, Venezuela and maintains an honorary consulate in Bogotá. Both nations are members of the G77 and the Non-Aligned Movement. In addition, Colombia has been an observer of the African Union since 2008.

== History ==
The two countries established diplomatic relations on 12 April 1994, when apartheid ended, during which the South African government was isolated by the international community. Colombia has maintained an embassy in Pretoria since 1995. The Embassy of South Africa in Venezuela is accredited to Colombia.

Between 12 and 13 May 2023, the vice president of Colombia, Francia Elena Márquez Mina, made an official visit to South Africa, where eight instruments of bilateral relations were conducted in various fields of education, technical and financial cooperation for development, and trade relations, which, together with previous agreements, define the path to strengthening bilateral relations, within the framework of the pillars of South-South cooperation and solidarity (SSC) relations that the two countries assume.

On 8 November 2023, Ambassador Lindiwe Maseko presented her diploma to the Colombian president Gustavo Petro, where a ceremony was held at the Nariño Palace. Consecutively, María del Rosario Mina Rojas presented her diploma as Ambassador Extraordinary and Plenipotentiary to the South African president Cyril Ramaphosa, on 3 October 2023.

== Economic relations ==
According to data from the Colombian Ministry in 2019, Colombia exports to South Africa the equivalent of 28 billion US dollars, with the main exports being coal and products related to light industry and agriculture; while South Africa exports to Colombia the equivalent of 26 billion dollars, with the main exports being those related to metallurgy, basic chemicals and machinery.

== Political relations ==
- April 2024 - Colombia joins South Africa's genocide case against Israel at the International Court of Justice (ICJ).

== Diplomatic missions ==
- Colombia has an embassy in Pretoria.
- South Africa uses its embassy in Caracas as a concurrent embassy to Colombia, and has an honorary consulate in Bogotá.

== See also ==
- Foreign relations of Colombia
- Foreign relations of South Africa
