= Lindiwe Maseko =

South African politician

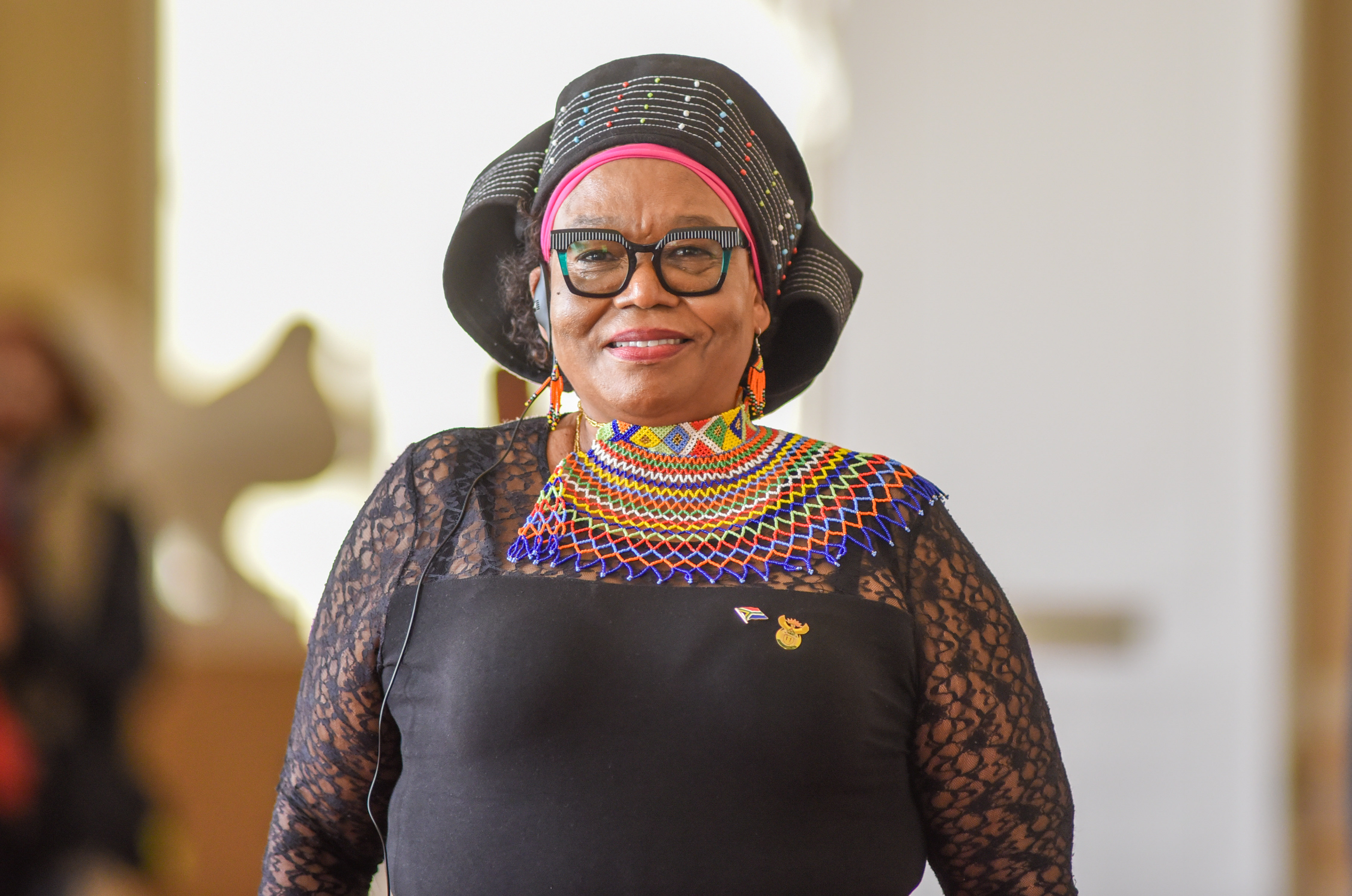
- Maseko, 2023

South African Ambassador to Venezuela
- Incumbent
- Assumed office 25 July 2022
- President: Cyril Ramaphosa
- Preceded by: Joseph Muzi Nkosi

Member of the National Assembly
- In office 21 May 2014 – 7 May 2019
- President: Jacob Zuma
- Constituency: Gauteng

Speaker of the Gauteng Provincial Legislature
- In office 2009–2014
- Premier: Nomvula Mokonyane
- Preceded by: Richard Mdakane
- Succeeded by: Ntombi Mekgwe

Member of the Gauteng Provincial Legislature
- In office 1994–2014

Provincial Treasurer of the African National Congress in Gauteng
- In office November 2001 – May 2010
- Chairperson: Mbhazima Shilowa; Paul Mashatile
- Preceded by: Joyce Kgoali
- Succeeded by: Ntombi Mekgwe

Personal details
- Born: 2 March 1958 (age 68) Alexandra, Transvaal; Union of South Africa
- Party: African National Congress

Lindiwe Michelle Maseko (born 2 March 1958) is a South African politician who was appointed South African Ambassador to Venezuela in July 2022. She previously served as a Member of the National Assembly from 2014 to 2019 and as a Member of the Gauteng Provincial Legislature from 1994 to 2014; she was Speaker of the Gauteng Provincial Legislature from 2009 to 2014. She is a member of the African National Congress (ANC) and was Provincial Treasurer of the ANC in Gauteng from 2001 to 2010.

== Early life ==
Maseko was born on 2 March 1958 in Alexandra township outside Johannesburg in the Transvaal, now part of Gauteng province. She grew up in Diepkloof in Soweto, where she was a student at Orlando High School during the 1976 Soweto uprising. In the 1980s, she was a member of the anti-apartheid Women Against Repression.

She joined the African National Congress (ANC) and ANC Women's League after the ANC was unbanned by the apartheid government in 1990, and she subsequently held leadership positions in local branch structures of the party and the league in Gauteng. In 1991, she was appointed personal assistant to provincial ANC leaders Tokyo Sexwale and Paul Mashatile; the job was based out of ANC headquarters at Shell House in Johannesburg.

== Provincial legislature ==
=== Gauteng legislature: 1994–2009 ===
Maseko was first elected as Member of the Gauteng Provincial Legislature in 1994 in South Africa's first post-apartheid election. Upon her re-election to the seat in 1999, she was elected Deputy Speaker in the provincial legislature; upon her re-election in 2004, she became Chairperson of Committees in the legislature; and in 2008, she was appointed the Chief Whip of the Majority Party, the ANC, in the legislature.

For much of this period, she was also Provincial Treasurer of the ANC in Gauteng; she held that office for three terms, from 2001 to 2010, under Provincial Chairpersons Mbhazima Shilowa and Paul Mashatile. She was also a founding member of the Soweto Heritage Trust. In 2004, she was elected to a three-year term as the Chairperson of the Commonwealth Women Parliamentarians in the Commonwealth Parliamentary Association. She had previously held (and later held) various leadership positions in the Africa section of the association. She chaired the national Political Office-Bearers Pension Fund from 2004 to 2009, and in addition acquired several business interests of her own: by 2012, the Company and Intellectual Property Commission listed Maseko as a director of seventeen companies.

=== Gauteng Speaker: 2009–2014 ===
Pursuant to the 2009 general election, Maseko was re-elected to a fourth term in her seat in the provincial legislature and was elected Speaker of the Gauteng Provincial Legislature under Nomvula Mokonyane, the new Premier of Gauteng. The first woman to hold the position, she was deputised by Steward Ngwenya and, from August 2012, by Uhuru Moiloa. In 2010, she banned Members of the Legislature from using the term "Alex mafia" in the legislature.

In early 2012, Maseko was accused of fostering a conflict of interest when the R6.5-million opening of the provincial legislature was held at the Coca-Cola Dome, a venue in Mamelodi which contracted Delmont Caldow Caterers as its regular caterer. Maseko had previously been a director of Delmont Caldow, and her daughter Edna remained a director. However, a spokesman pointed out that the legislature had not directly contracted with Delmont Caldow. Later in 2012, the Star reported that Maseko had instructed her office to purchase various groceries worth R10,998; she said that the groceries were required by the office and were not intended for her personal consumption. Maseko's conduct in both episodes was subject to investigation by the Gauteng Integrity Commissioner, Ralph Mgijima, and by the Privileges and Ethics Committee of the provincial legislature. Both investigations cleared her of personal wrongdoing, finding that she had not contravened the provincial ministerial code nor indulged in exorbitant or frivolous spending: she had not directly influenced the selection of the caterer for the legislative opening, and a six-month stock of groceries had been bought for her office due to poor supply chain management and record-keeping.

== National legislature ==
In the 2014 general election, Maseko left the provincial legislature and was elected to a seat in the National Assembly, the lower house of South Africa's national Parliament. She was ranked fourth on the ANC's regional party list for Gauteng. She served as the ANC whip in the Portfolio Committee on Science and Technology from 2014 to 2016, and then chaired the same committee from 2017 to 2019. She vacated her seat in the 2019 general election.

== Later roles ==
As of August 2021, Maseko was chairperson of the board of City Power, the public electric utility in the City of Johannesburg. In January 2022, she – alongside Ronald Lamola, Jeff Radebe, and Joel Netshitenzhe – was appointed by President Cyril Ramaphosa to serve on an internal ANC committee which was tasked with guiding the ANC's response to the findings of the Zondo Commission. In July of that year, Ramaphosa appointed her the South African Ambassador to Venezuela.
