= Evening Star (newspaper) =

Evening Star is the name of the following newspapers:

== Australia ==
- The Evening Star (Boulder, Western Australia), a daily newspaper published in Kalgoorlie-Boulder from 1898 to 1921

== Canada ==
- The Evening Star, former name of the Toronto Star, a daily newspaper based in Toronto, Ontario, Canada

== New Zealand ==
- Evening Star (Dunedin), a daily newspaper published in Dunedin, New Zealand, from 1863 to 1979

== United Kingdom ==
- Evening Star (Ipswich), a daily newspaper in Ipswich, England, published since 1885

== United States ==
- The Evening Star, former name of The Star in Auburn, Indiana
- The Evening Star, a daily newspaper published in Madison, Indiana, from 1876 until it was bought by the Madison Courier in 1884
- The Evening Star, a newspaper published in the 1800s in what is now Rensselaer, New York
- Washington Evening Star, a daily afternoon newspaper published in Washington, D.C., from 1852 to 1981

== See also ==
- The Evening and the Morning Star (1832–1834), the first newspaper of the Latter Day Saint movement
- Evening Star (disambiguation)
- Star (newspaper)
