= Evening Star =

Evening Star or evening star may refer to:

== Astronomy ==
- The planet Venus when it appears in the west (evening sky), after sunset
  - The ancient Greeks gave it the name Hesperus (latin Vesper)
- Less commonly, the planet Mercury when it appears in the west (evening sky) after sunset

== Plants ==
- Oenothera biennis, a medicinal plant
- Mentzelia decapetala, Mentzelia pumila, and other species of Mentzelia

== Arts and entertainment ==
- The Evening Star (painting), an 1830 landscape painting by J.M.W. Turner
- "Song to the Evening Star" ("O du mein holder Abendstern"), an aria from Richard Wagner's 1845 opera Tannhäuser
- The Evening Star, an engraving of a painting by Sir Thomas Lawrence for The Amulet, 1833 in combination with a poem by Letitia Elizabeth Landon.
- The Evening Star, an engraving of a painting by John Boaden for The Amulet, 1836, in combination with a poem by Letitia Elizabeth Landon.
- "Evening Star", a poem by Edgar Allan Poe
- The Evening Star, a 1996 sequel to the film Terms of Endearment
- Evening Star (Fripp & Eno album), 1975
- Evening Star (Joshua Breakstone album), 1988
- "Evening Star" (Kenny Rogers song), 1984
- "Evening Star" (Judas Priest song), from their 1978 album Killing Machine
- "Evening Star", a song from the 1967 album For All the Seasons of Your Mind by Janis Ian
- "Evening Star", a song from the 2010 album Destroyer of the Void by Blitzen Trapper
- "Evening Star", a song from the 2003 album Valley of the Damned by DragonForce
- "Evening Star", a song from the 2011 album The Lay of Thrym by Týr
- "Evening Star", a song from the 1992 album Death or Glory? by Roy Harper
- "Evening Star", a song from the 2009 album The Underfall Yard by Big Big Train
- Evening Star (video game), a 1987 train simulator
- The Evening Star (Traveller), a 1979 role-playing game supplement for Traveller
- Evening Star Studio, a video game company

== Other uses ==
- Evening Star (newspaper), a list of newspapers
- BR 92220 Evening Star, the last steam locomotive to be built by British Railways
- British Rail Class 66 no. 66779, the last Class 66 built for the British market. Named in fitting with the last BR steam locomotive built.
- Exercise Evening Star, the annual demonstration of emergency response to a submarine nuclear accident at Faslane, HMNB Clyde, Argyll, Scotland
- Lady Eveningstar, Maya Queen

== See also ==
- The Evening and the Morning Star (1832–1834), the first newspaper of the Latter Day Saint movement
- "To The Evening Star", a poem by William Blake from Poetical Sketches, 1783
- Luceafărul (poem) ("The Evening Star"), an 1883 poem by Mihai Eminescu
- "Abendstern" ("Evening Star"), a poem by Johann Mayrhofer set to music by Franz Schubert; see List of songs by Franz Schubert
- Arwen, an elf-maiden in J. R. R. Tolkien's writings is also referred to as "Undomiel", elvish for "Evenstar"
- Morning star (disambiguation)
- Evenstar (disambiguation)
