= Daily Star =

Daily Star may refer to:

== United States ==
- Arizona Daily Star, published in Tucson, Arizona
- Cincinnati Daily Star (1872–1880), merged with the Spirit of the Times to form The Cincinnati Times-Star, Ohio
- The Fredericksburg Daily Star, Fredericksburg, Virginia, predecessor to The Free Lance–Star
- Daily Star (Louisiana), Hammond, Louisiana
- The Daily Star (Oneonta), Oneonta, New York
- The Marion Star, formerly The Marion Daily Star, Marion, Ohio
- Minneapolis Daily Star (1920–about 1939), a predecessor of the Star Tribune, Minneapolis, Minnesota
- Warrensburg Star-Journal, formerly The Daily Star-Journal, Warrensburg, Missouri

== Canada ==
- The Montreal Daily Star, a former name of the Montreal Star, Montreal, Quebec
- Regina Daily Star, a predecessor of the Leader-Post, Regina, Saskatchewan
- Toronto Daily Star, former name of the Toronto Star, Toronto, Ontario

== Elsewhere ==
- Daily Star (United Kingdom), a British tabloid newspaper
- The Daily Star (Bangladesh), a Bangladeshi broadsheet newspaper
- The Daily Star (Lebanon), an English-language newspaper published in Lebanon
- Irish Daily Star, an Irish tabloid newspaper

== Fictional ==
- Daily Star (DC Comics), in Superman stories published between 1938 and 1986

== See also ==
- Star (newspaper), the name of various newspapers
