= Liaison Office of South Africa, Taipei =

Representative office of South Africa to the Republic of China

Liaison Office of the Republic of South Africa in Taipei
- 南非聯絡辦事處
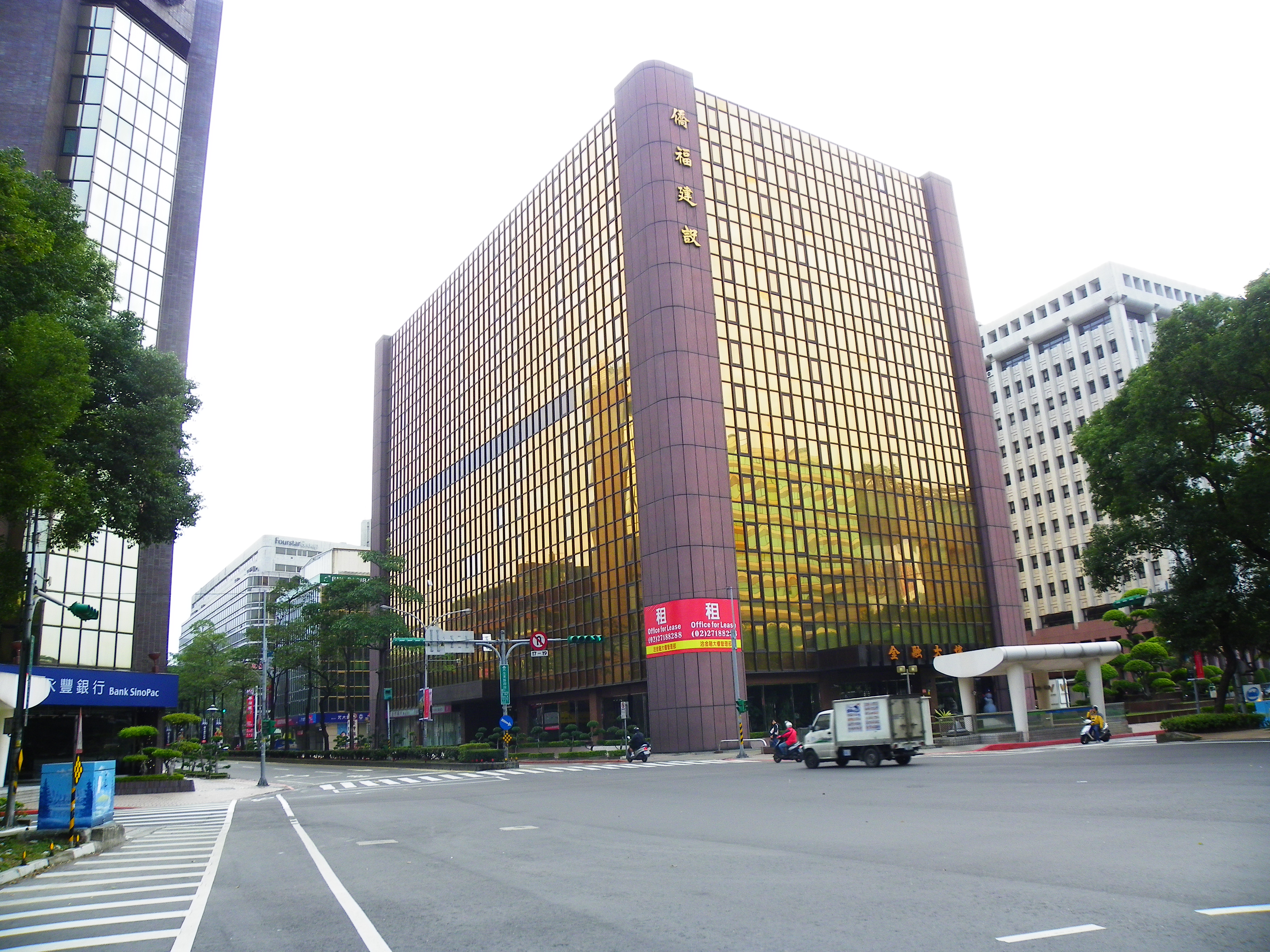
- Chaofu Finance Building where the Liaison Office of South Africa is located.

Agency overview
- Formed: 1998
- Jurisdiction: Republic of China
- Headquarters: Songshan, Taipei, Taiwan; 25°03′27.0″N 121°32′59.1″E
- Agency executive: Zakhele Samson Mnisi, Representative
- Website: www.southafrica.org.tw

The Liaison Office of the Republic of South Africa in Taipei (Chinese: 南非聯絡辦事處) represents the interests of South Africa in Taiwan in the absence of formal diplomatic relations, functioning as a de facto embassy. It also provides visa services. Its counterpart of Taiwan is the Taipei Liaison Office in the Republic of South Africa in Pretoria.

The Office is headed by a Representative.

== History ==
The Office was formerly the Embassy of the Republic of South Africa. South Africa first established a Consulate in Taipei in 1967, which was upgraded to a Consulate General three years later. In 1976, this was upgraded to an Embassy.

However, when South Africa recognised the People's Republic of China, its diplomatic relations with Taiwan were terminated. This led to the establishment of the Office in 1998.

== See also ==
- South Africa–Taiwan relations
- List of diplomatic missions of South Africa
