= Richard Mdakane =

South African politician (born 1955)

Member of the National Assembly
- In office 16 March 2023 – 28 May 2024
- Preceded by: Nathi Mthethwa
- In office April 2009 – May 2019

Speaker of the Gauteng Provincial Legislature
- In office April 2004 – April 2009
- Preceded by: Firoz Cachalia
- Succeeded by: Lindiwe Maseko

Member of the Gauteng Provincial Legislature
- In office April 1994 – April 2009

Personal details
- Born: 1 January 1955 (age 71) Dundee, Natal Province; Union of South Africa
- Party: African National Congress

Mzameni Richard Mdakane (born 1 January 1955) is a South African politician who has represented the African National Congress (ANC) in the National Assembly previously from 2009 until 2019, when he failed to gain re-election, and again from March 2023 until May 2024. Before that, he represented the party in the Gauteng Provincial Legislature for fifteen years from 1994 to 2009; he also served a term as Speaker of the Gauteng Provincial Legislature from 2004 to 2009.

== Early life ==
Mdakane was born on 1 January 1955 in Dundee (later known as KwaThalane) in the former Natal province. His mother was a domestic worker and his father was a migrant worker. After finishing high school, Mdakane moved to Johannesburg, where his father worked, and grew increasingly active in anti-apartheid youth politics, including through the Alexandra Civic Organisation and the ANC underground.

== Political career ==
Mdakane was first elected to the Gauteng Provincial Legislature in 1994, representing the ANC, and he was re-elected to his seat in 1999 and 2004. After the 2004 general election, he was additionally elected, unopposed, as Speaker of the Gauteng Provincial Legislature.

After a full legislative term as Speaker, Mdakane stood for election to the National Assembly, the lower house of the national Parliament, in the 2009 general election. He served ten years in the National Assembly, securing re-election to his seat in the 2014 general election. After the 2014 general election, he was also elected unopposed to chair the Portfolio Committee on Cooperative Governance and Traditional Affairs.

In the 2019 general election, Mdakane stood for re-election to the National Assembly, but he was ranked 144th on the ANC's national party list and did not secure a seat.

On 16 March 2023, he entered the National Assembly as a replacement for former Nathi Mthethwa, who resigned as a Member of Parliament after being axed in a cabinet reshuffle on 6 March 2023. He did not stand in the 2024 general election and left parliament.
