= Star (newspaper) =

Star or The Star is the name of various newspapers:

== Africa ==
- The Star (Kenya), an English-language daily newspaper published in Nairobi
- The Star (South Africa), based in Gauteng

== Asia ==
- Star (Ceylon), a defunct Ceylonese newspaper
- The Philippine Star, a Manila-based Philippine newspaper
- The Star (Hong Kong)
- The Star (Jordan), an English-language newspaper published in Amman, Jordan
- The Star (Malaysia)
- The Star (Pakistan), a Pakistani evening newspaper
- Star (Turkey)

== Europe ==
- The Star (1788–1831), a London evening newspaper founded in 1788, now defunct
- The Star (1888–1960), a London evening newspaper founded in 1888, merged with another newspaper in 1960
- The Star (Sheffield newspaper), an English local newspaper

== North America ==
=== Canada ===
- Toronto Star
- The Sudbury Star
- Windsor Star
- The Montreal Star, 1869–1979

=== United States ===
- Star, a glossy celebrity magazine, originally a supermarket tabloid newspaper
- The Star (Chicago newspaper), a Chicago, Illinois, newspaper group
- The Star (Florida), a weekly newspaper published in Port St. Joe, Florida, U.S.
- The Star, an African American paper in Newport News, Virginia
- The Star (Tinley Park), Chicago
- The Star (Auburn), a daily newspaper in Auburn, Indiana
- The Indianapolis Star, Indianapolis, Indiana
- The Kansas City Star, Kansas City, Missouri
- The Meridian Star, Meridian, Mississippi
- Omaha Star, a historic African American newspaper in North Omaha, Nebraska
- Seattle Star, a daily newspaper in Seattle, Washington (1899–1947)
- Seattle Star (2002–2005), a free, neighborhood newspaper in Seattle, Washington
- Tribune-Star, a daily newspaper in Terre Haute, Indiana, a successor to The Terre Haute Star
- Washington Star, published in Washington, D.C. between 1852 and 1981

== Oceania ==
- Auckland Star, a New Zealand daily published from 1870 to 1991
- The Star (Christchurch), a New Zealand daily published from 1868 to 1991
- The Star (Ballarat), an Australian newspaper published from 1855 to 1924
- The Star (Sydney), an Australian newspaper published from 1887 to 1909, then as The Sun until 1988

== See also ==
- Star (disambiguation)
- Daily Star (disambiguation)
- Evening Star (disambiguation)
- Morning Star (disambiguation)
- The North Star (anti-slavery newspaper), published from 1847–1851 by the abolitionist Frederick Douglass
- Northern Star (disambiguation)
- Star News (disambiguation)
