= The Evening Star (Traveller) =

Science-fiction role-playing game supplement

The Evening Star is a 1979 role-playing game supplement for Traveller published by R. Warfield Game Design.

== Contents ==
The Evening Star is a supplement about the Evening Star, a hollowed out asteroid used for the pleasures of the wealthy, with a map showing an overhead view of the Evening Star.

== Reception ==
Tony Watson reviewed The Evening Star in The Space Gamer No. 34. Watson commented that "Despite the price, The Evening Star is a fine playing aid for use with Traveller, and should certainly provide some good material for any referee."
