= Evenstar =

Evenstar is an old term for the "evening star" of astronomy, denoting the planet Venus or (less commonly) the planet Mercury.

It may also refer to:

- Arwen, a character in J. R. R. Tolkien's fantasy world of Middle-earth
- the Evenstar, a jewel which Arwen gives to her love Aragorn from the The Lord of the Rings book trilogy by J. R. R. Tolkien and later included in the The Lord of the Rings film series directed by Peter Jackson.
- The Evenstar, a ship in Janny Wurts's Wars of Light and Shadow.
- Evenstar, a French company organizing cultural and musical events.
