= List of diplomatic missions of South Africa =

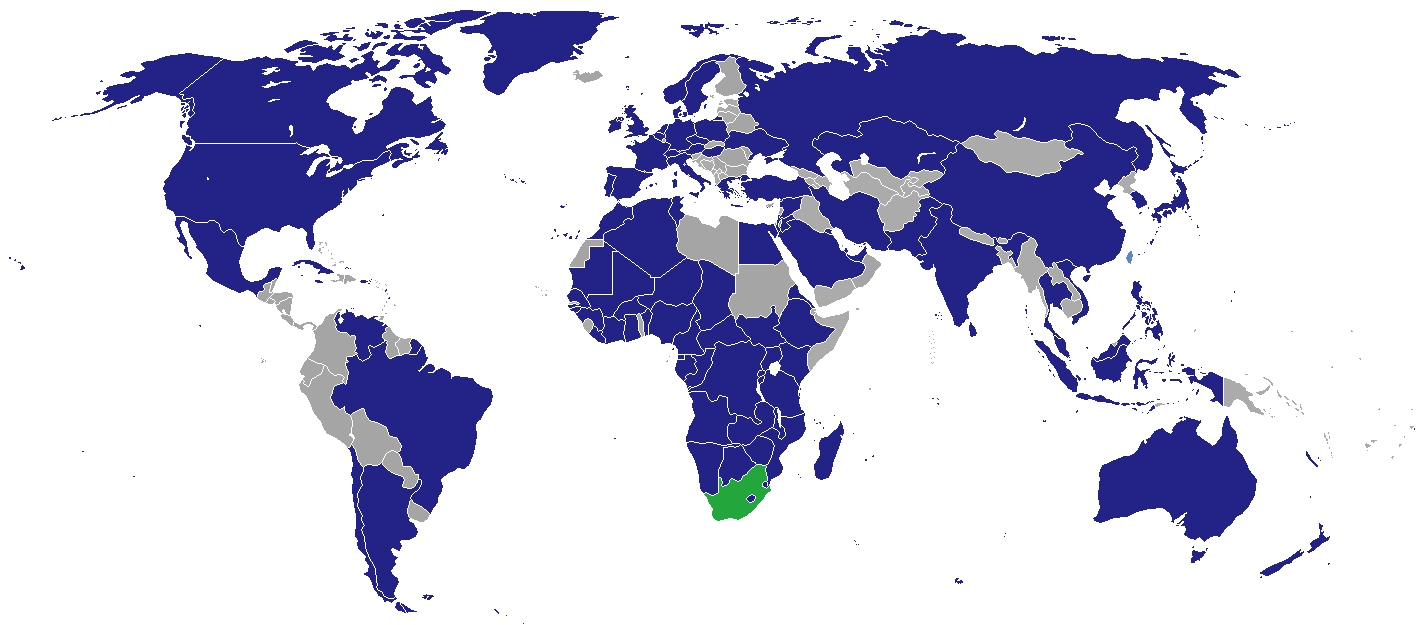
South African diplomatic mission

This is a list of diplomatic missions of South Africa. South Africa dramatically expanded its diplomatic presence globally, especially in Africa, in the immediate years after the end of apartheid. It was the only country to have embassies in the various bantustan states of Transkei, Venda, Bophuthatswana and Ciskei that South Africa established. During apartheid, it was one of the few countries to recognise Taiwan as the Republic of China, when it become a democratic nation it established diplomatic relations with the People's Republic of China in 1998.

== Current missions ==
=== Africa ===
Host country	Host city	Mission	Concurrent accreditation	Ref.
Algeria	Algiers	Embassy	Countries: Sahrawi Republic	
Angola	Luanda	Embassy		
Benin	Cotonou	Embassy	Countries: Togo	
Botswana	Gaborone	High Commission		
Burkina Faso	Ouagadougou	Embassy		
Burundi	Bujumbura	Embassy		
Cameroon	Yaoundé	High Commission		
Central African Republic	Bangui	Embassy		
Chad	N'Djamena	Embassy		
Comoros	Moroni	Embassy		
Congo-Brazzaville	Brazzaville	Embassy		
Congo-Kinshasa	Kinshasa	Embassy		
Congo-Kinshasa	Lubumbashi	Consulate-General		
Egypt	Cairo	Embassy		
Equatorial Guinea	Malabo	Embassy		
Eritrea	Asmara	Embassy		
Eswatini	Mbabane	High Commission		
Ethiopia	Addis Ababa	Embassy	Countries: Djibouti; Somalia; International Organizations: African Union; United Nations Economic Commission for Africa	
Ivory Coast	Abidjan	Embassy		
Gabon	Libreville	High Commission		
Ghana	Accra	High Commission	Countries: Sierra Leone	
Guinea	Conakry	Embassy		
Guinea-Bissau	Bissau	Embassy		
Kenya	Nairobi	High Commission	International Organizations: United Nations; United Nations Environment Programme; United Nations Human Settlements Programme	
Lesotho	Maseru	High Commission		
Liberia	Monrovia	Embassy		
Madagascar	Antananarivo	Embassy		
Malawi	Lilongwe	High Commission		
Mali	Bamako	Embassy		
Mauritania	Nouakchott	Embassy		
Mauritius	Port Louis	High Commission	Countries: Seychelles	
Morocco	Rabat	Embassy		
Mozambique	Maputo	High Commission		
Namibia	Windhoek	High Commission		
Niger	Niamey	Embassy		
Nigeria	Abuja	High Commission		
Nigeria	Lagos	Consulate-General		
Rwanda	Kigali	High Commission		
Senegal	Dakar	Embassy	Countries: Cape Verde; Gambia	
South Sudan	Juba	Embassy		
Tanzania	Dar es Salaam	High Commission	International Organizations: East African Community	
Tunisia	Tunis	Embassy	Countries: Libya	
Uganda	Kampala	High Commission		
Zambia	Lusaka	High Commission		
Zimbabwe	Harare	Embassy		

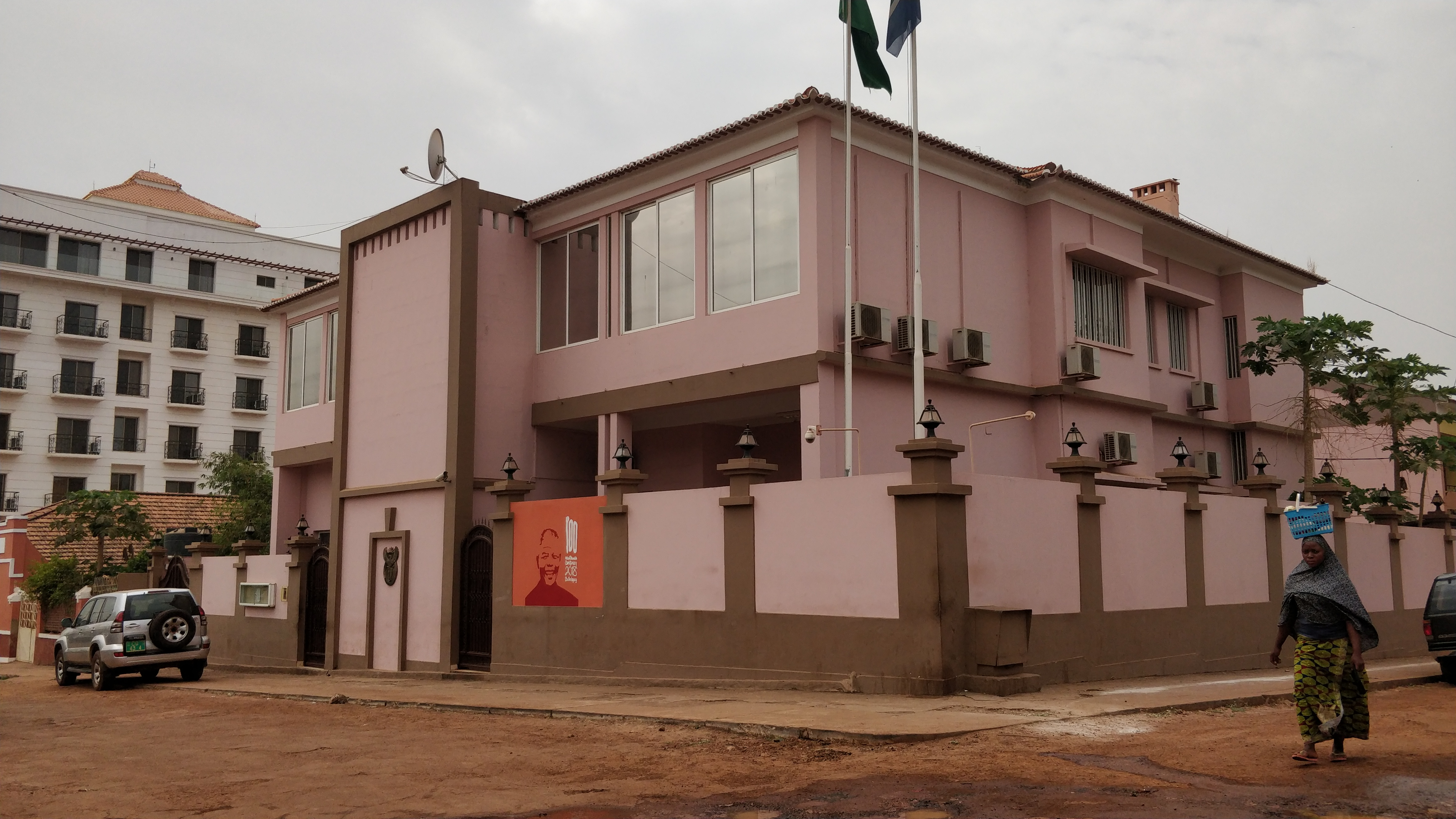
Embassy in Bissau

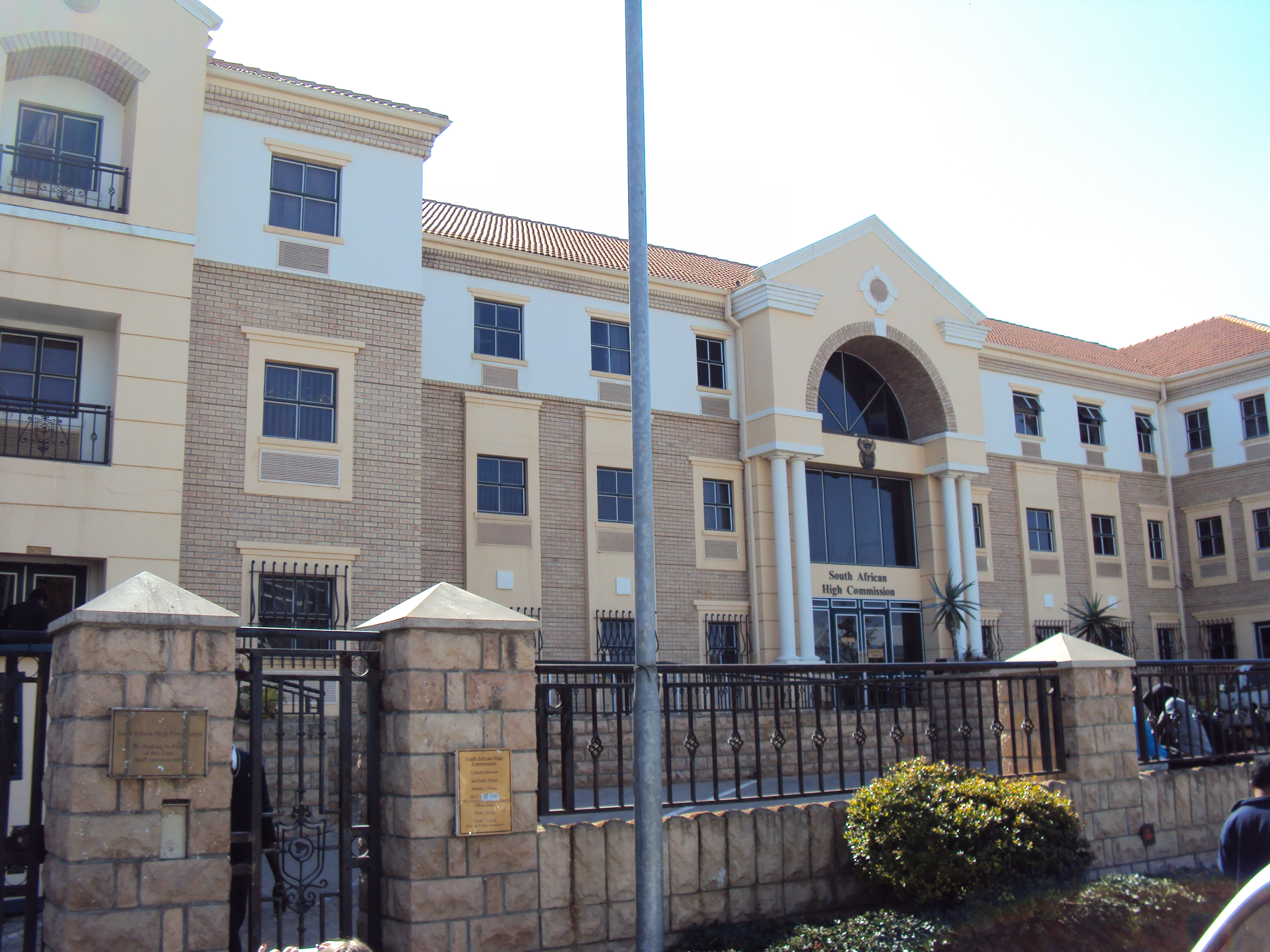
High Commission in Gaborone

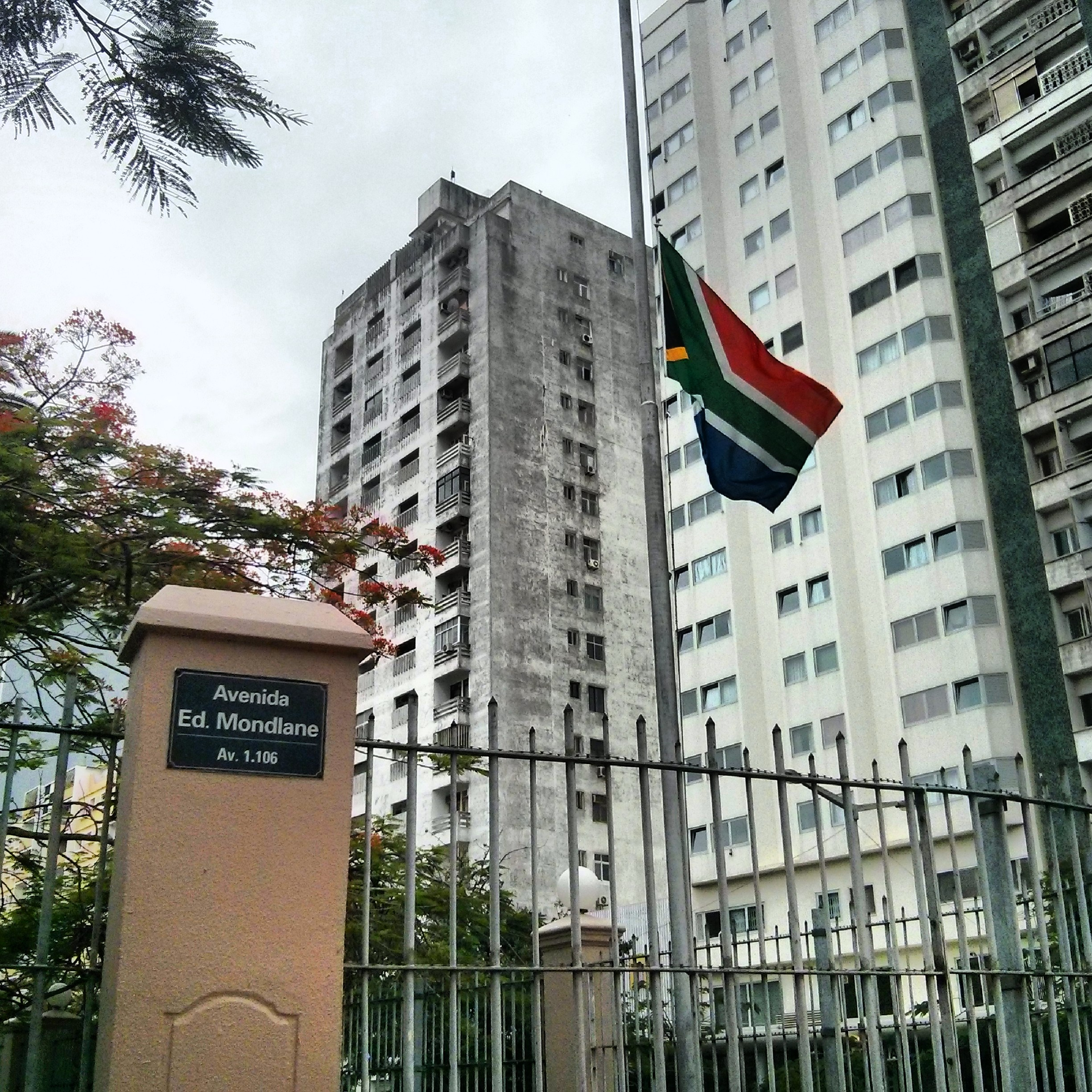
High Commission in Maputo

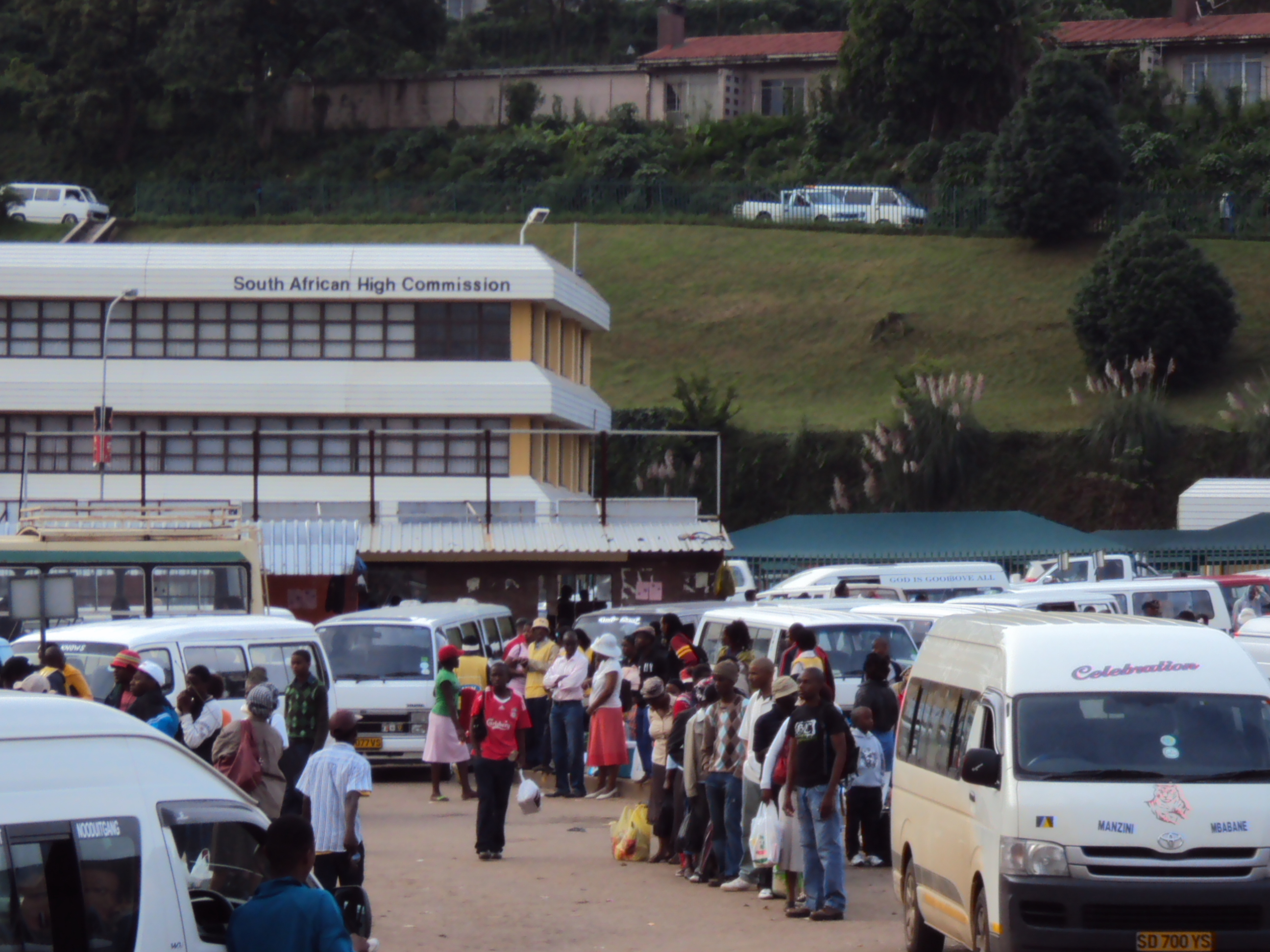
High Commission in Mbabane

=== Americas ===
Host country	Host city	Mission	Concurrent accreditation	Ref.
Argentina	Buenos Aires	Embassy	Countries: Paraguay; Uruguay	
Brazil	Brasília	Embassy		
Brazil	São Paulo	Consulate-General		
Canada	Ottawa	High Commission		
Canada	Toronto	Consulate-General		
Chile	Santiago de Chile	Embassy	Countries: Ecuador; Peru	
Cuba	Havana	Embassy	Countries: Dominican Republic	
Jamaica	Kingston	High Commission	Countries: Antigua and Barbuda; Bahamas; Barbados; Belize; Dominica; Grenada; Guyana; Haiti; Saint Kitts and Nevis; Saint Lucia; Saint Vincent and the Grenadines; Suriname; Trinidad and Tobago	
Mexico	Mexico City	Embassy	Countries: Costa Rica; El Salvador; Guatemala; Honduras; Nicaragua; Panama	
United States	Washington, D.C.	Embassy		
United States	Los Angeles	Consulate-General		
United States	New York City	Consulate-General		
Venezuela	Caracas	Embassy	Countries: Colombia	

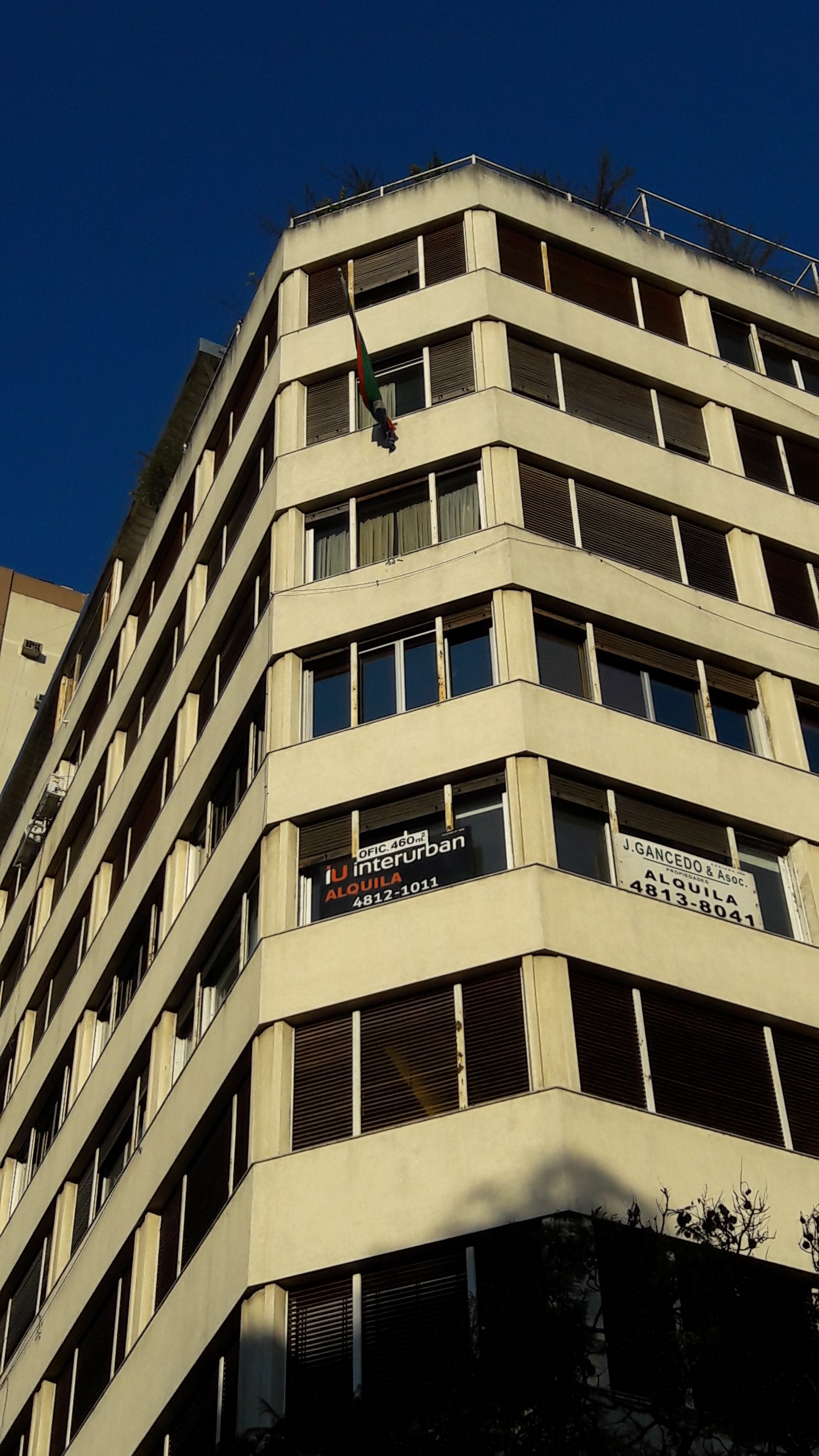
Embassy in Buenos Aires

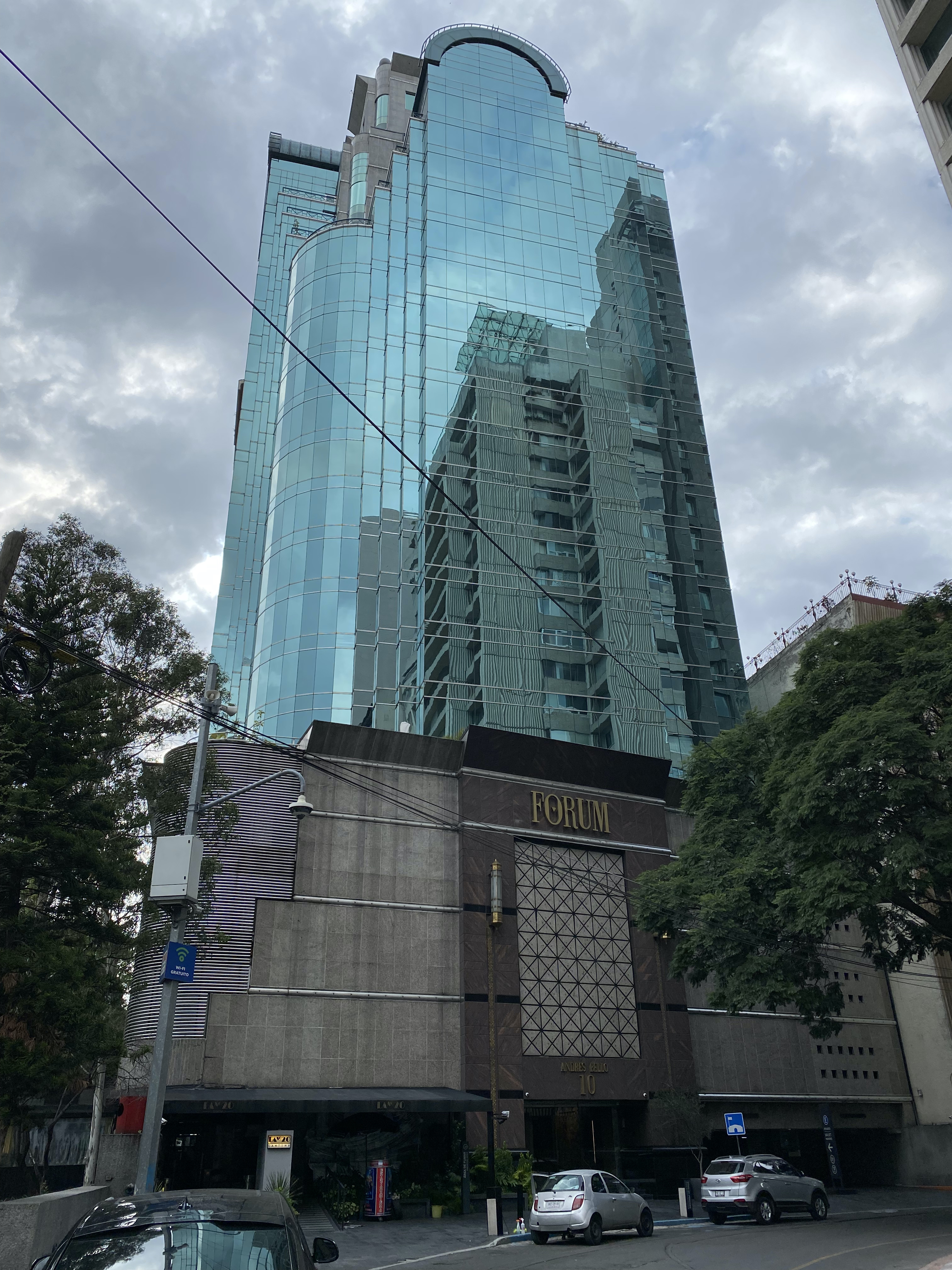
Building hosting the Embassy in Mexico City

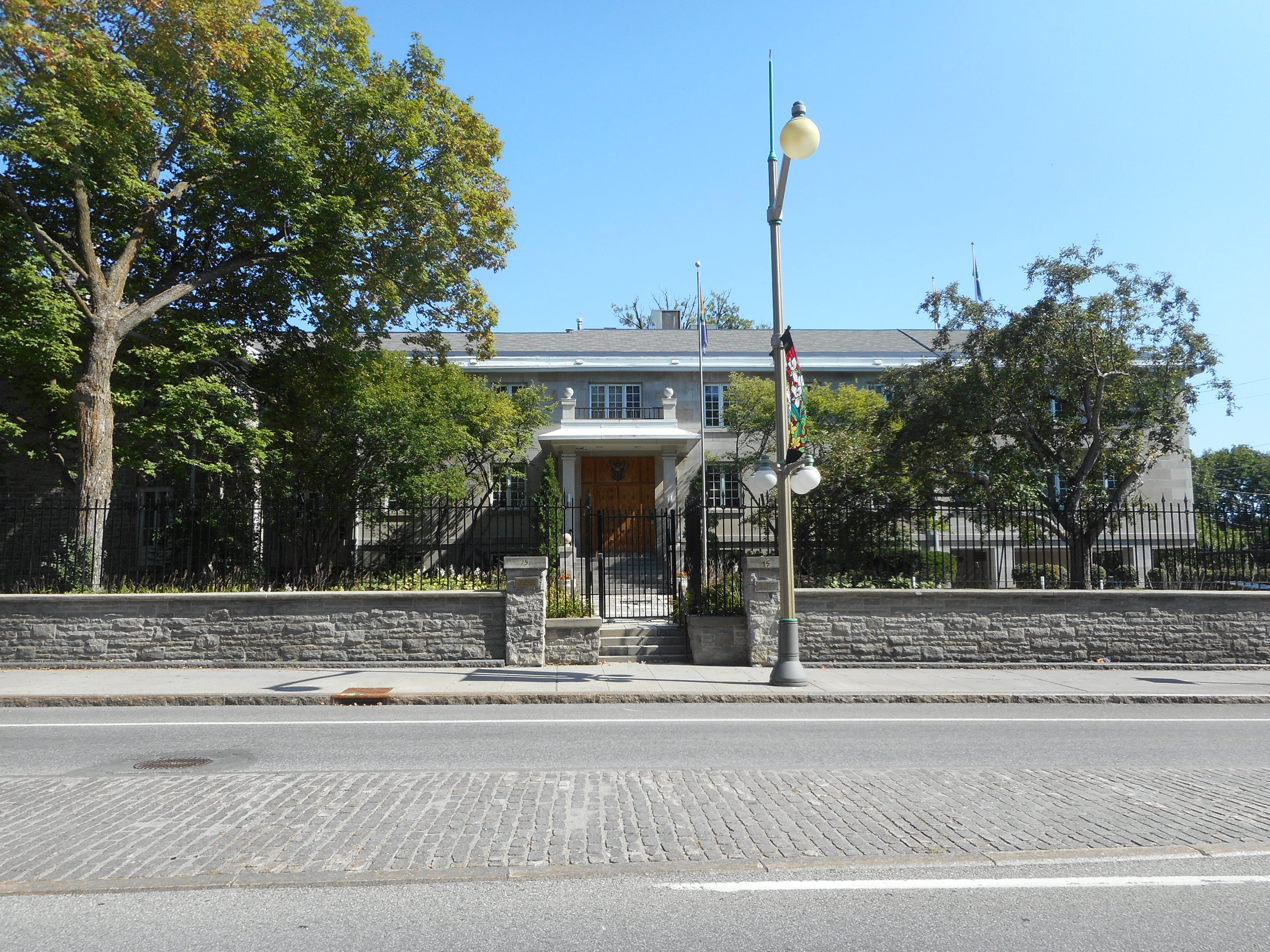
High Commission in Ottawa

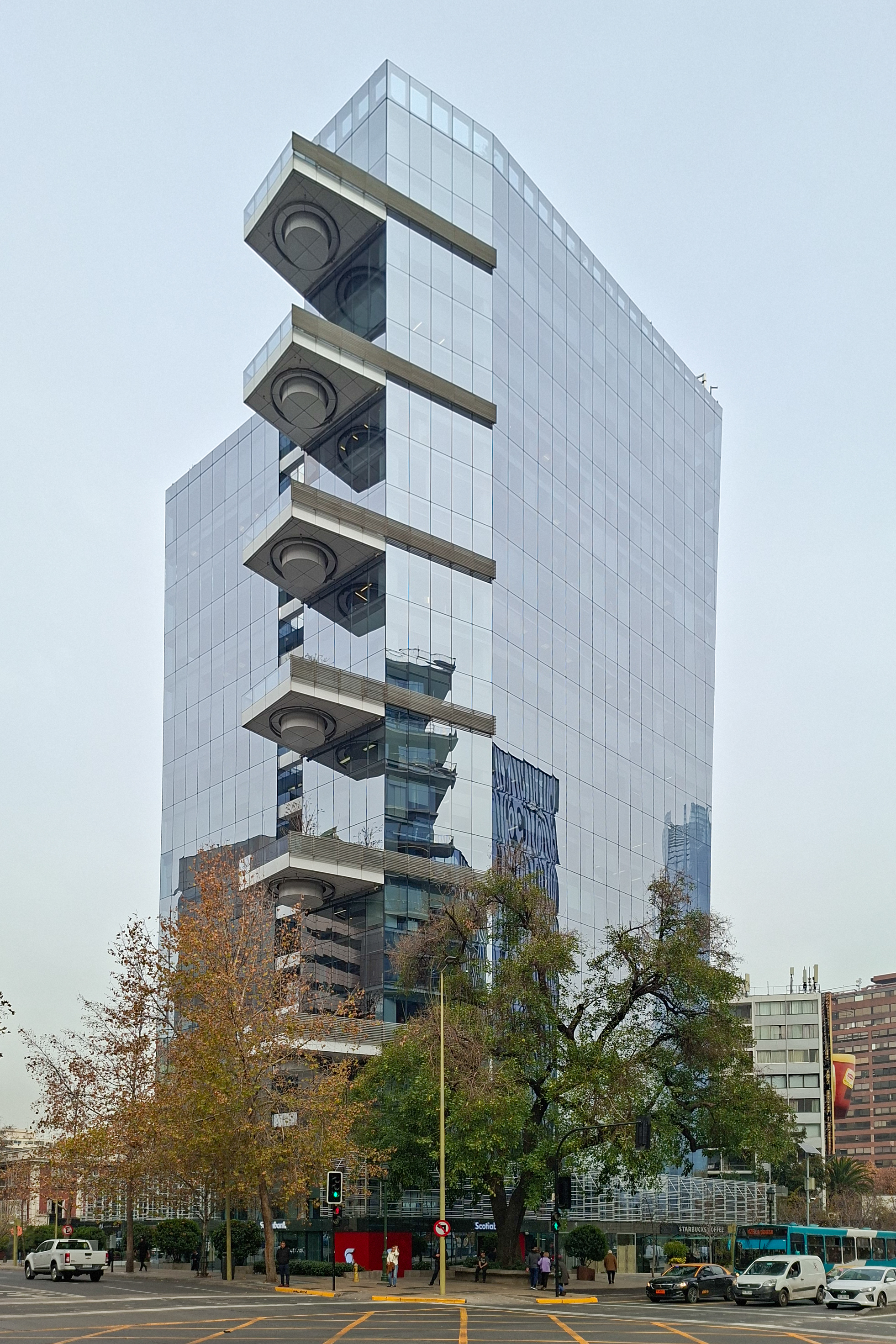
Building hosting the Embassy in Santiago

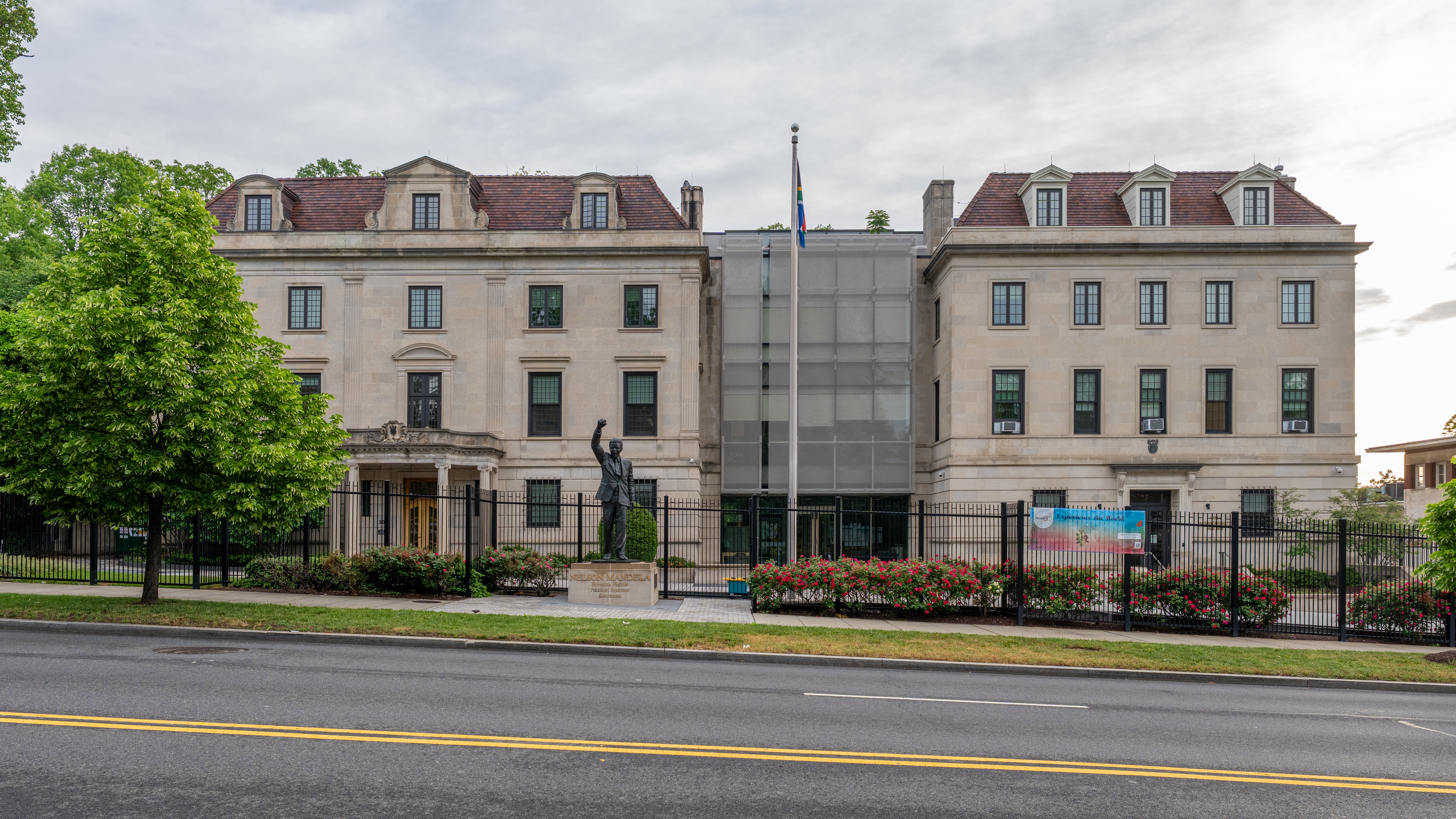
Embassy in Washington, D.C.

=== Asia ===
Host country	Host city	Mission	Concurrent accreditation	Ref.
China	Beijing	Embassy	Countries: Mongolia; North Korea	
China	Hong Kong	Consulate-General	Countries: Mongolia; North Korea	
China	Shanghai	Consulate-General	Countries: Mongolia; North Korea	
India	New Delhi	High Commission	Countries: Bangladesh; Nepal	
India	Mumbai	Consulate-General	Countries: Bangladesh; Nepal	
Indonesia	Jakarta	Embassy	Countries: Timor-Leste; International Organizations: Association of Southeast Asian Nations	
Iran	Tehran	Embassy		
Japan	Tokyo	Embassy		
Jordan	Amman	Embassy	Countries: Iraq	
Kazakhstan	Astana	Embassy	Countries: Kyrgyzstan; Tajikistan; Turkmenistan	
Kuwait	Kuwait City	Embassy		
Malaysia	Kuala Lumpur	High Commission	Countries: Brunei	
Pakistan	Islamabad	High Commission	Countries: Afghanistan	
Palestine	Ramallah	Representative office		
Philippines	Manila	Embassy	Countries: Palau	
Qatar	Doha	Embassy		
Saudi Arabia	Riyadh	Embassy	Countries: Bahrain; Oman; Yemen	
Saudi Arabia	Jeddah	Consulate-General	Countries: Bahrain; Oman; Yemen	
Singapore	Singapore	High Commission		
South Korea	Seoul	Embassy		
Sri Lanka	Colombo	High Commission	Countries: Maldives	
Syria	Damascus	Embassy	Countries: Lebanon	
Republic of China (Taiwan)	Taipei	Liaison office		
Thailand	Bangkok	Embassy	Countries: Cambodia; Laos; Myanmar	
Turkey	Ankara	Embassy	Countries: Azerbaijan; Uzbekistan	
United Arab Emirates	Abu Dhabi	Embassy		
United Arab Emirates	Dubai	Consulate-General		
Vietnam	Hanoi	Embassy		

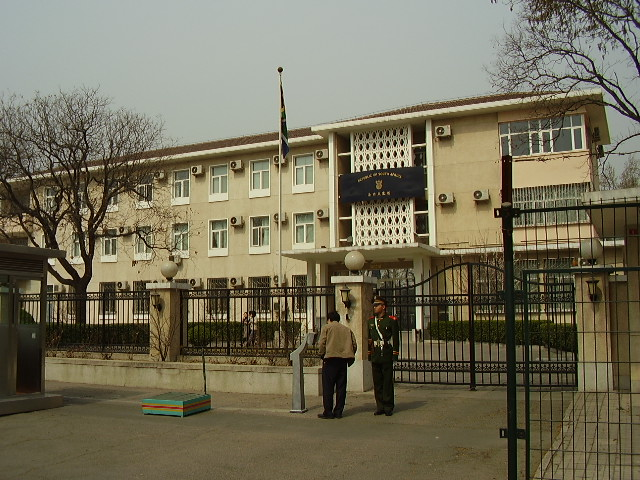
Embassy in Beijing

Building hosting the embassy in Manila

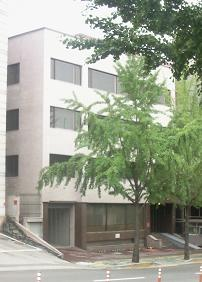
Embassy in Seoul

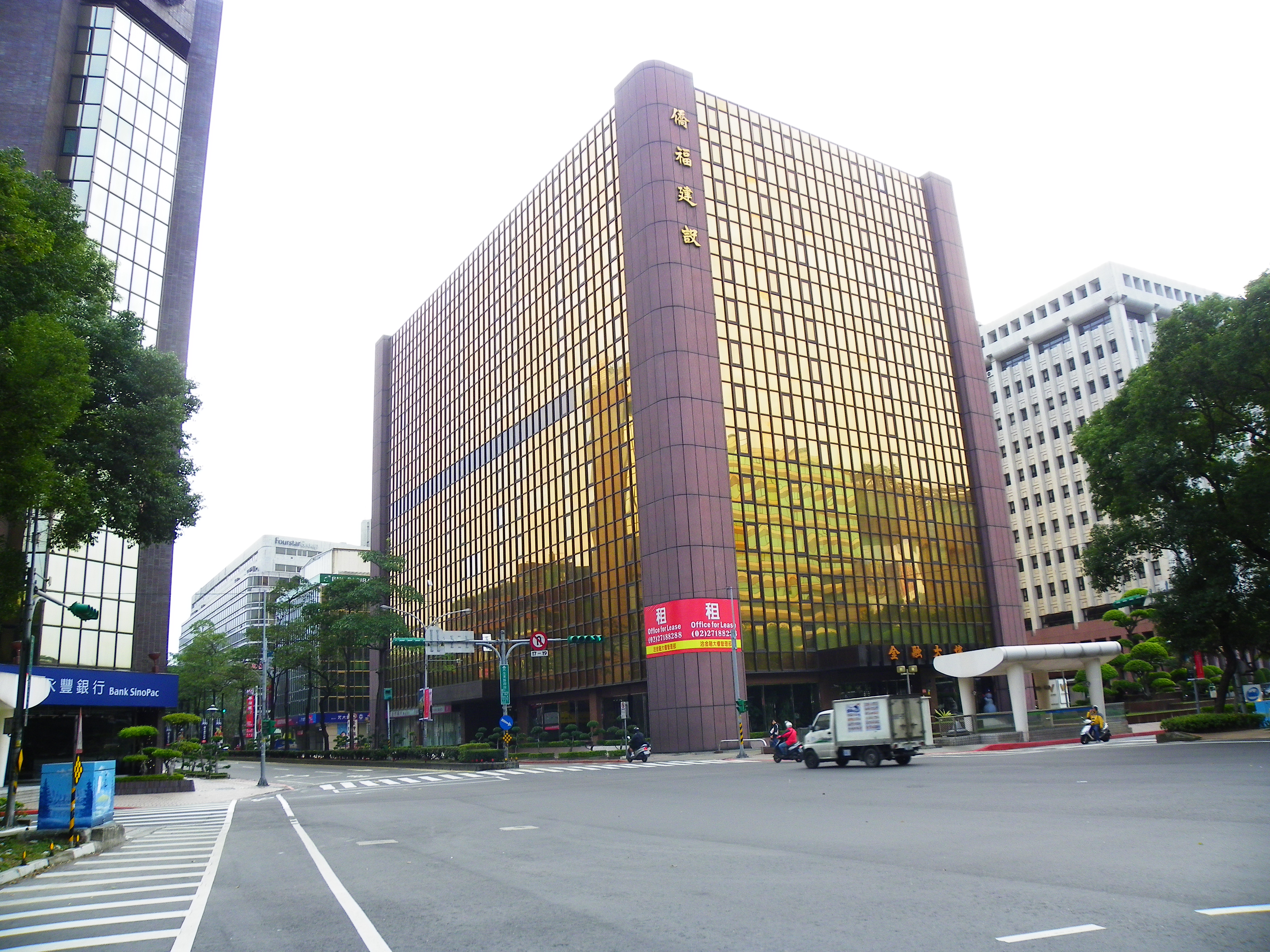
Building hosting the Liaison Office in Taipei

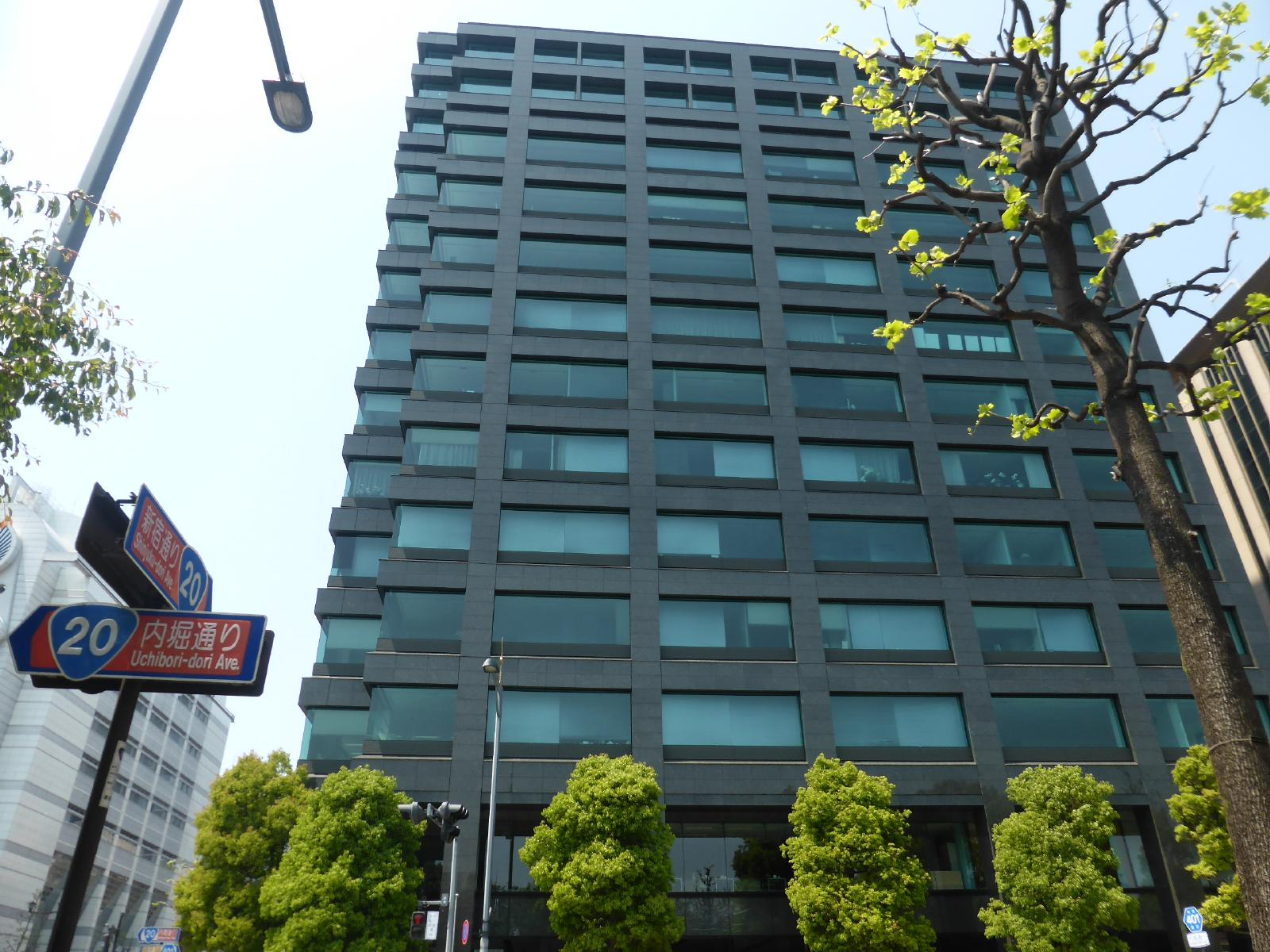
Building hosting the Embassy in Tokyo

=== Europe ===
Host country	Host city	Mission	Concurrent accreditation	Ref.
Austria	Vienna	Embassy	Countries: Slovakia; Slovenia; International Organizations: United Nations; CTBTO Preparatory Commission; International Atomic Energy Agency; United Nations Industrial Development Organization; United Nations Office on Drugs and Crime	
Belgium	Brussels	Embassy	Countries: Luxembourg; International Organizations: European Union	
Czechia	Prague	Embassy		
Denmark	Copenhagen	Embassy		
France	Paris	Embassy	Countries: Monaco	
Germany	Berlin	Embassy	Countries: Romania	
Germany	Munich	Consulate-General	Countries: Romania	
Greece	Athens	Embassy	Countries: Bosnia and Herzegovina; Cyprus; Montenegro; North Macedonia; Serbia	
Hungary	Budapest	Embassy	Countries: Croatia	
Ireland	Dublin	Embassy		
Italy	Rome	Embassy	Countries: Albania; Malta; San Marino	
Netherlands	The Hague	Embassy	International Organizations: Organisation for the Prohibition of Chemical Weapons	
Norway	Oslo	Embassy	Countries: Iceland	
Poland	Warsaw	Embassy		
Portugal	Lisbon	Embassy		
Russia	Moscow	Embassy	Countries: Belarus	
Spain	Madrid	Embassy	Countries: Andorra	
Sweden	Stockholm	Embassy	Countries: Estonia; Finland; Latvia; Lithuania	
Switzerland	Bern	Embassy	Countries: Liechtenstein	
Ukraine	Kyiv	Embassy	Countries: Armenia; Georgia; Moldova	
United Kingdom	London	High Commission		

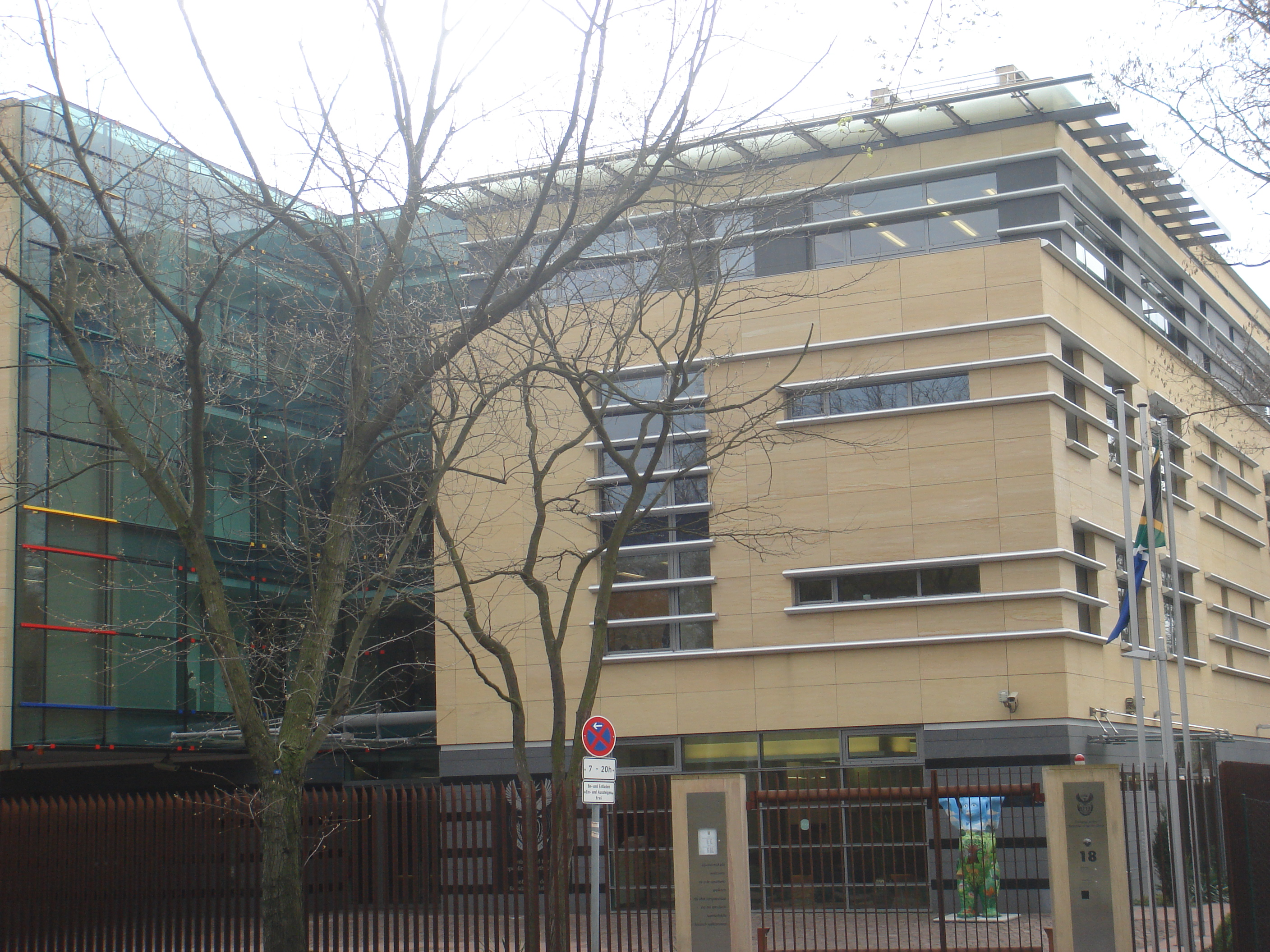
Embassy in Berlin

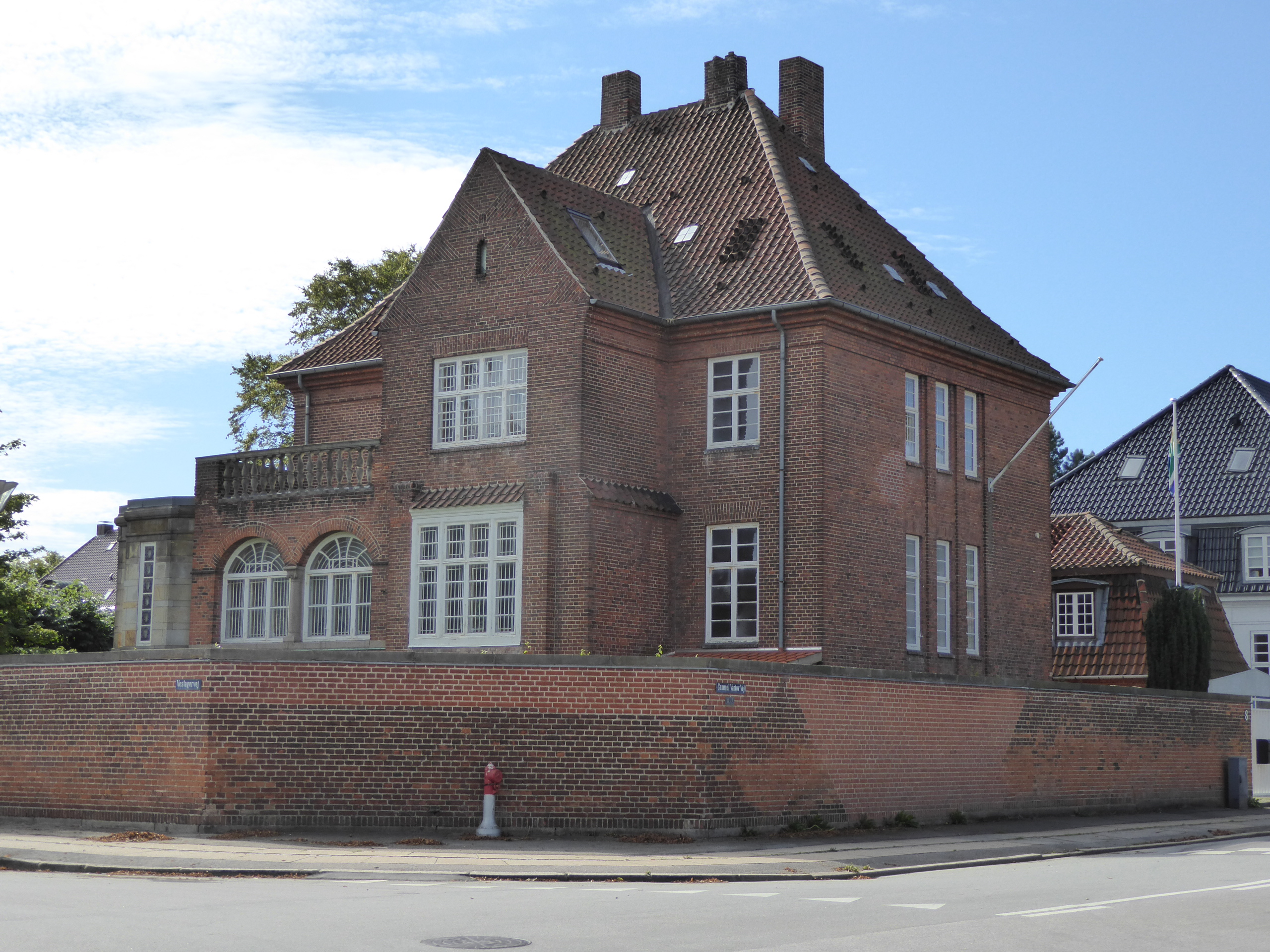
Embassy in Copenhagen

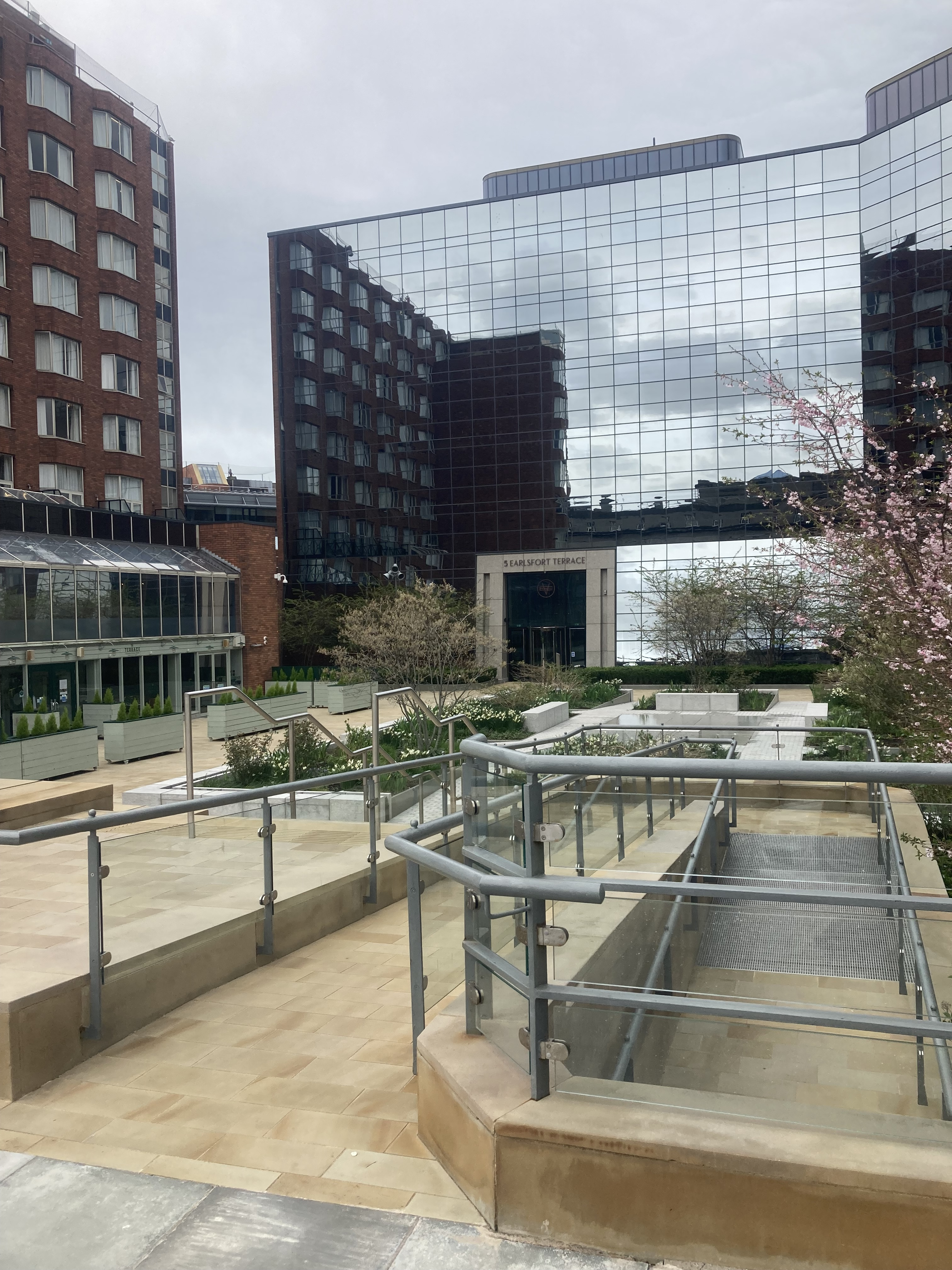
Building hosting the Embassy in Dublin

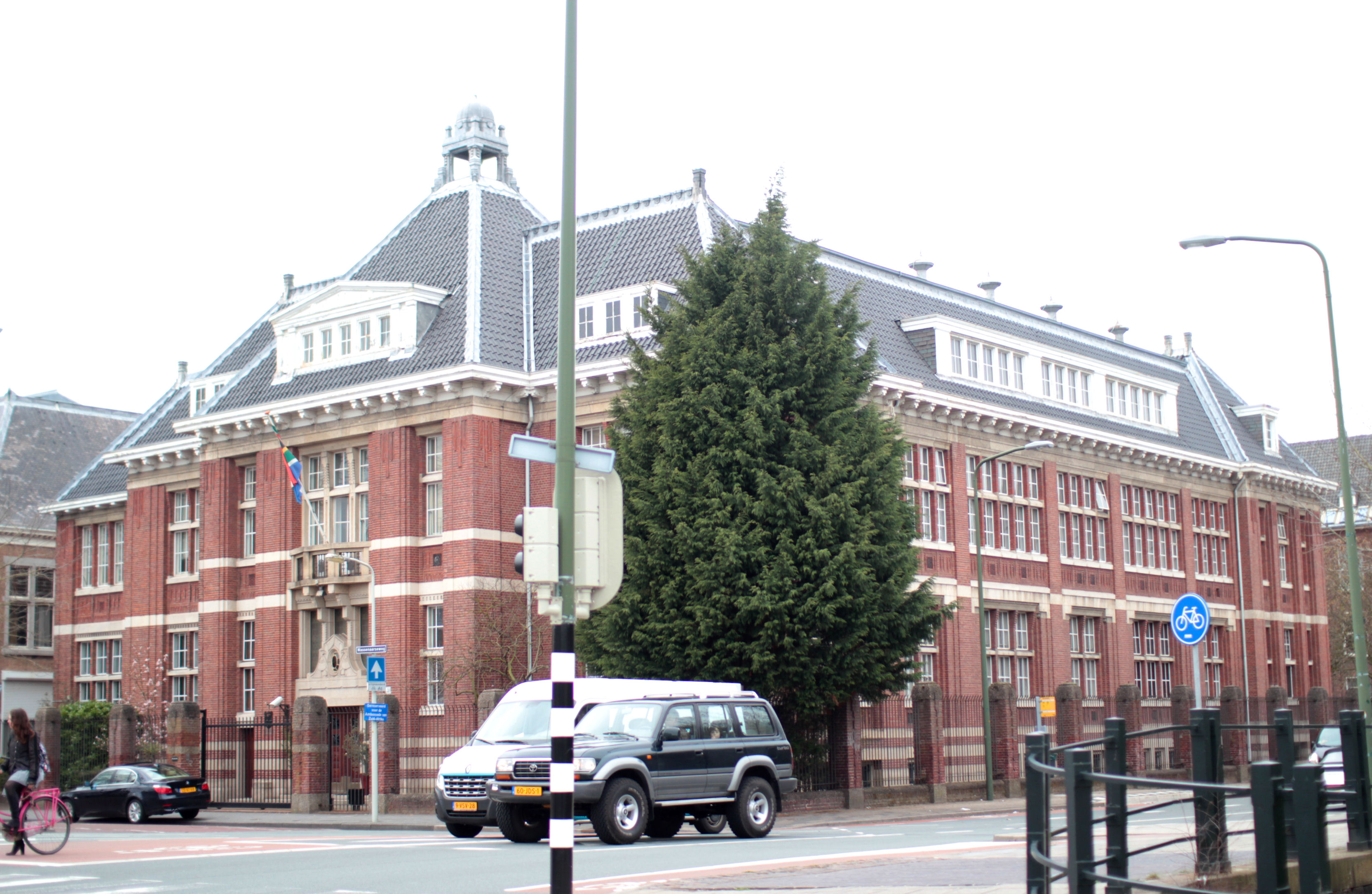
Embassy in The Hague

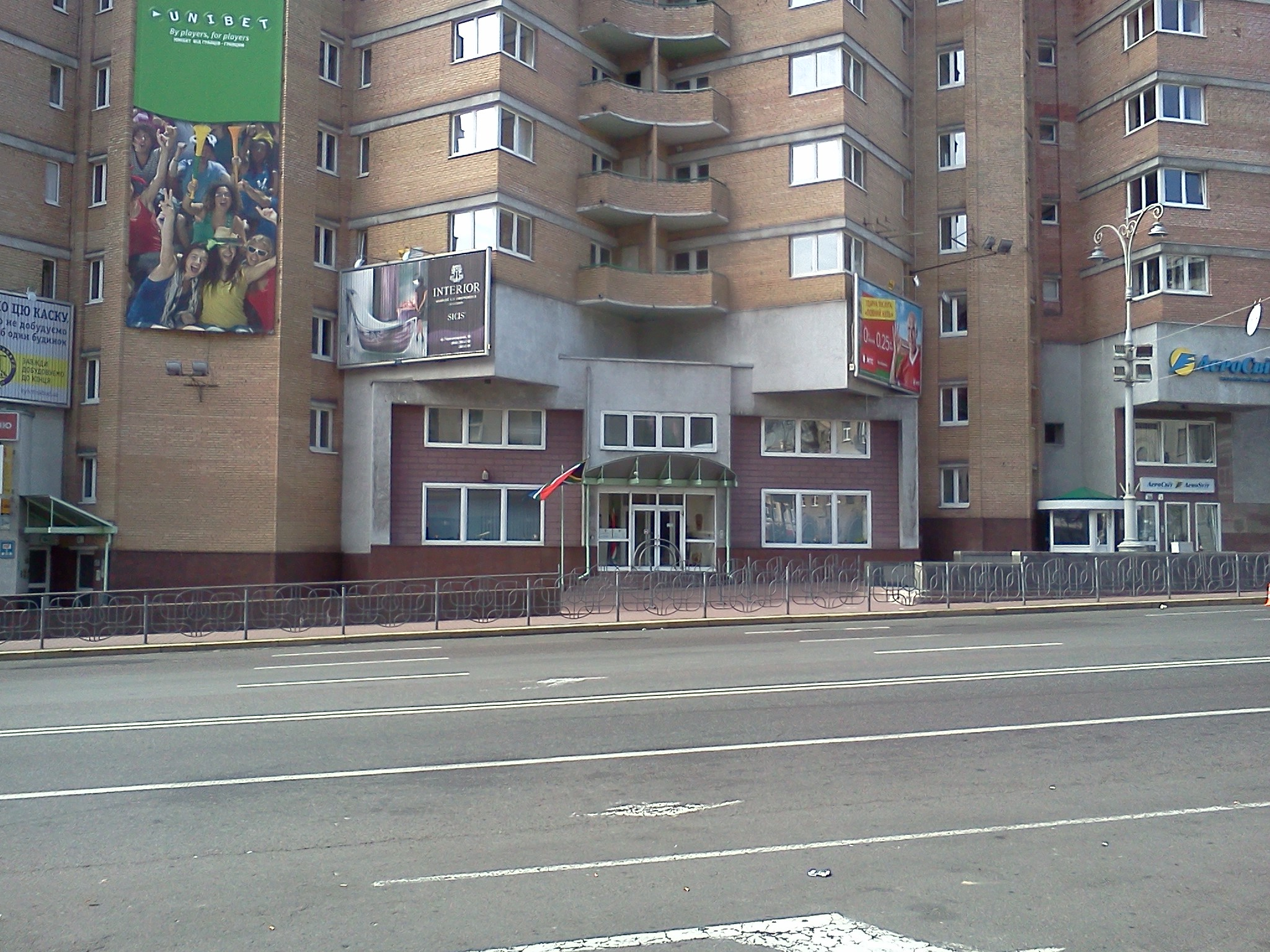
Embassy in Kyiv

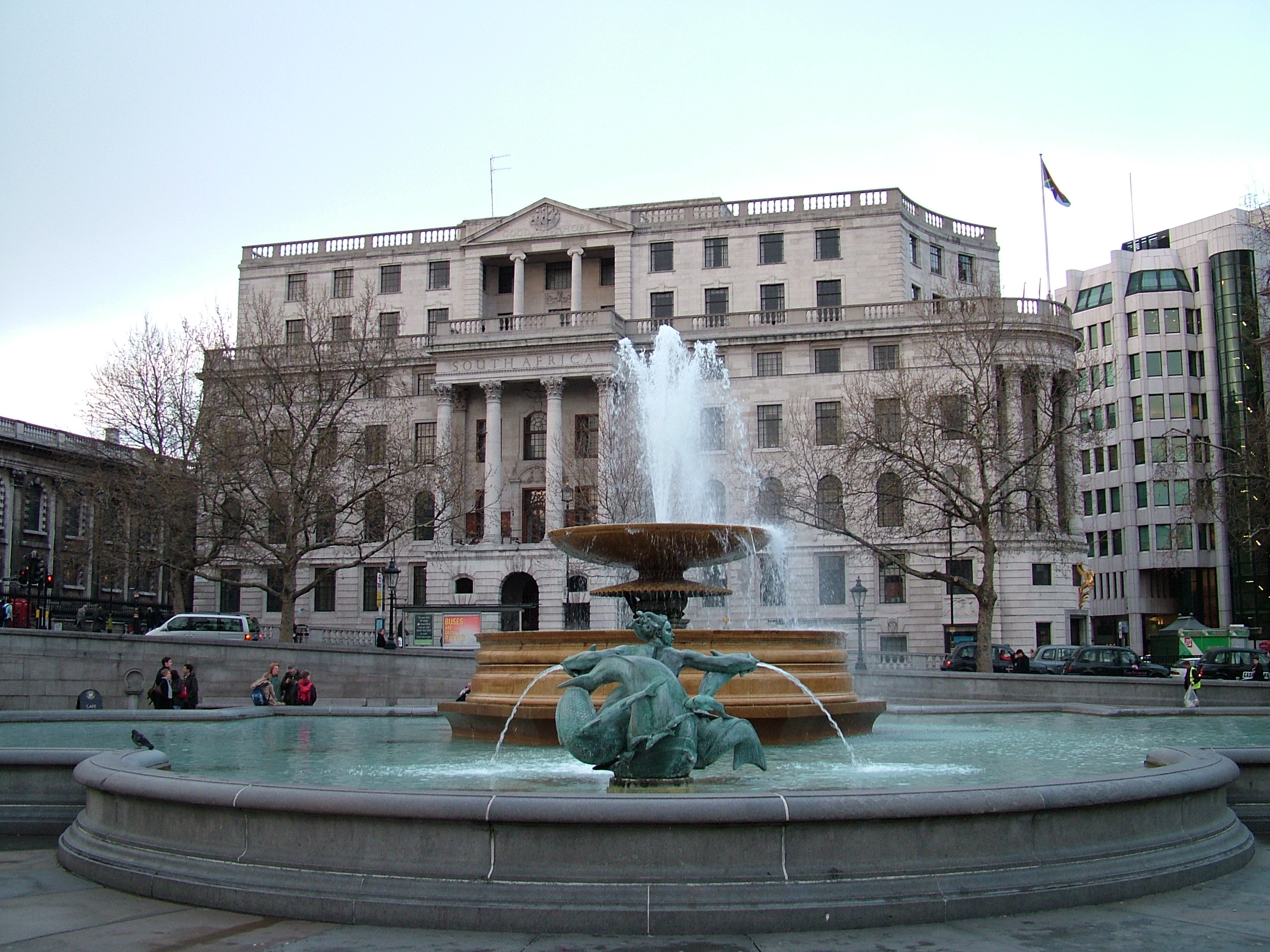
High Commission in London

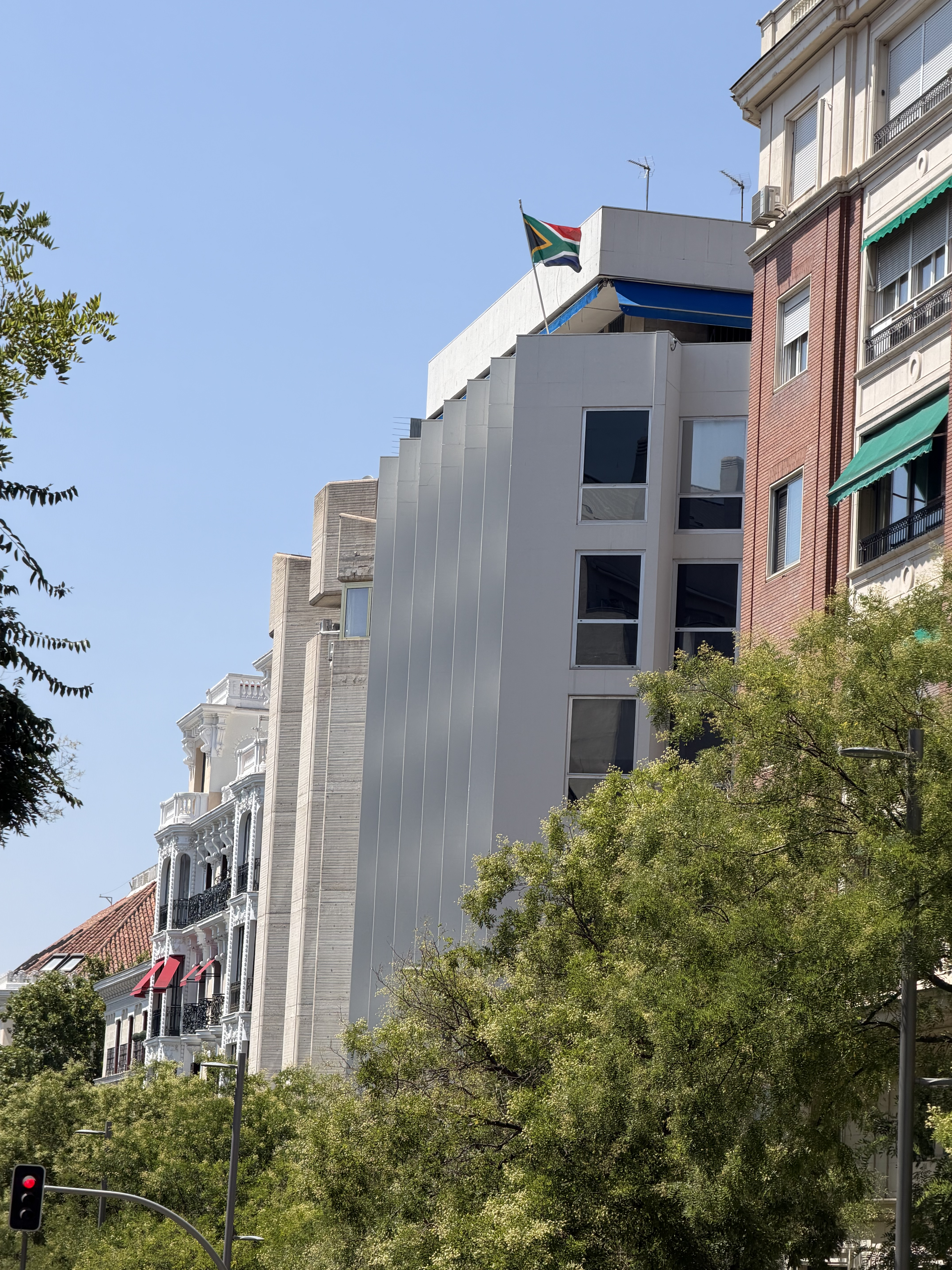
Embassy in Madrid

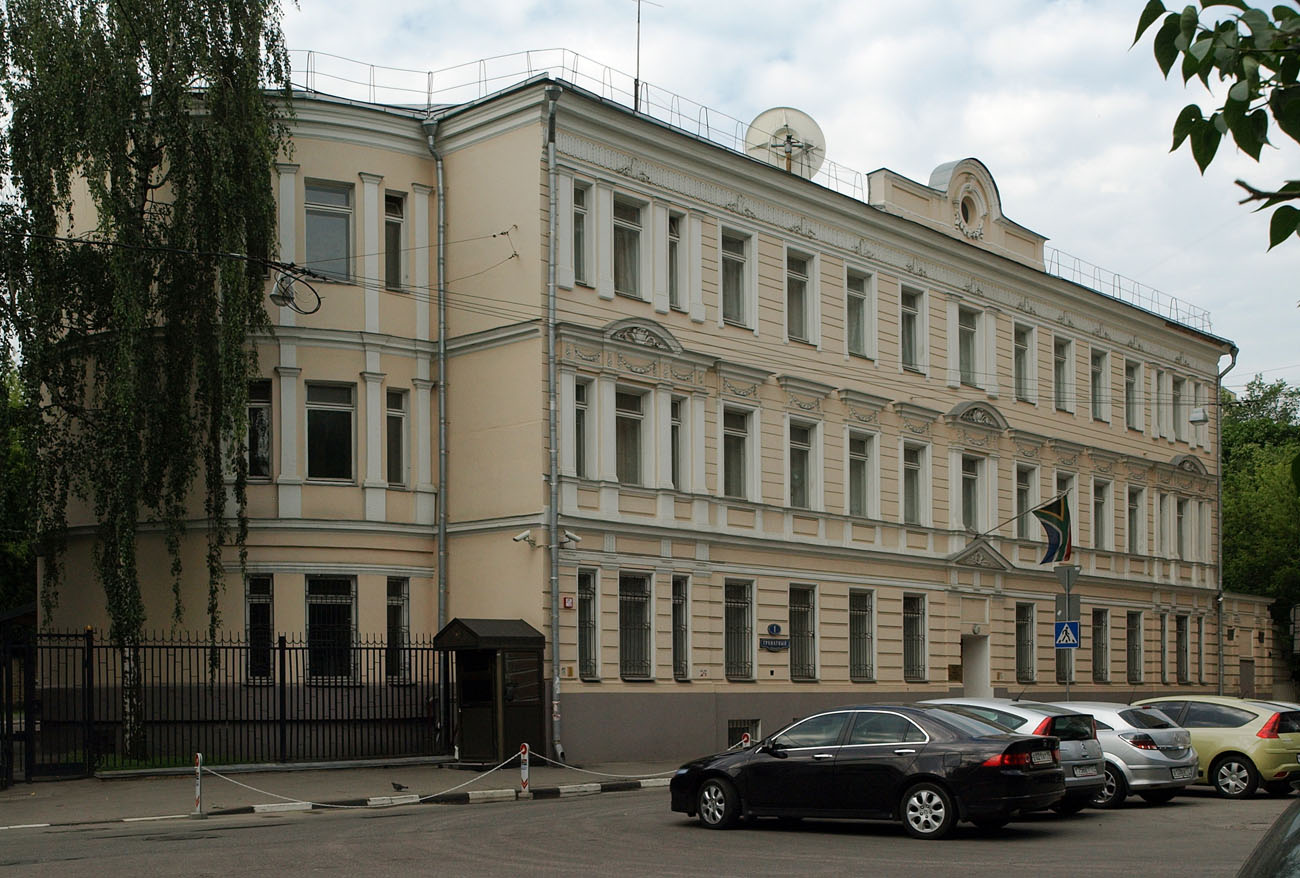
Embassy in Moscow

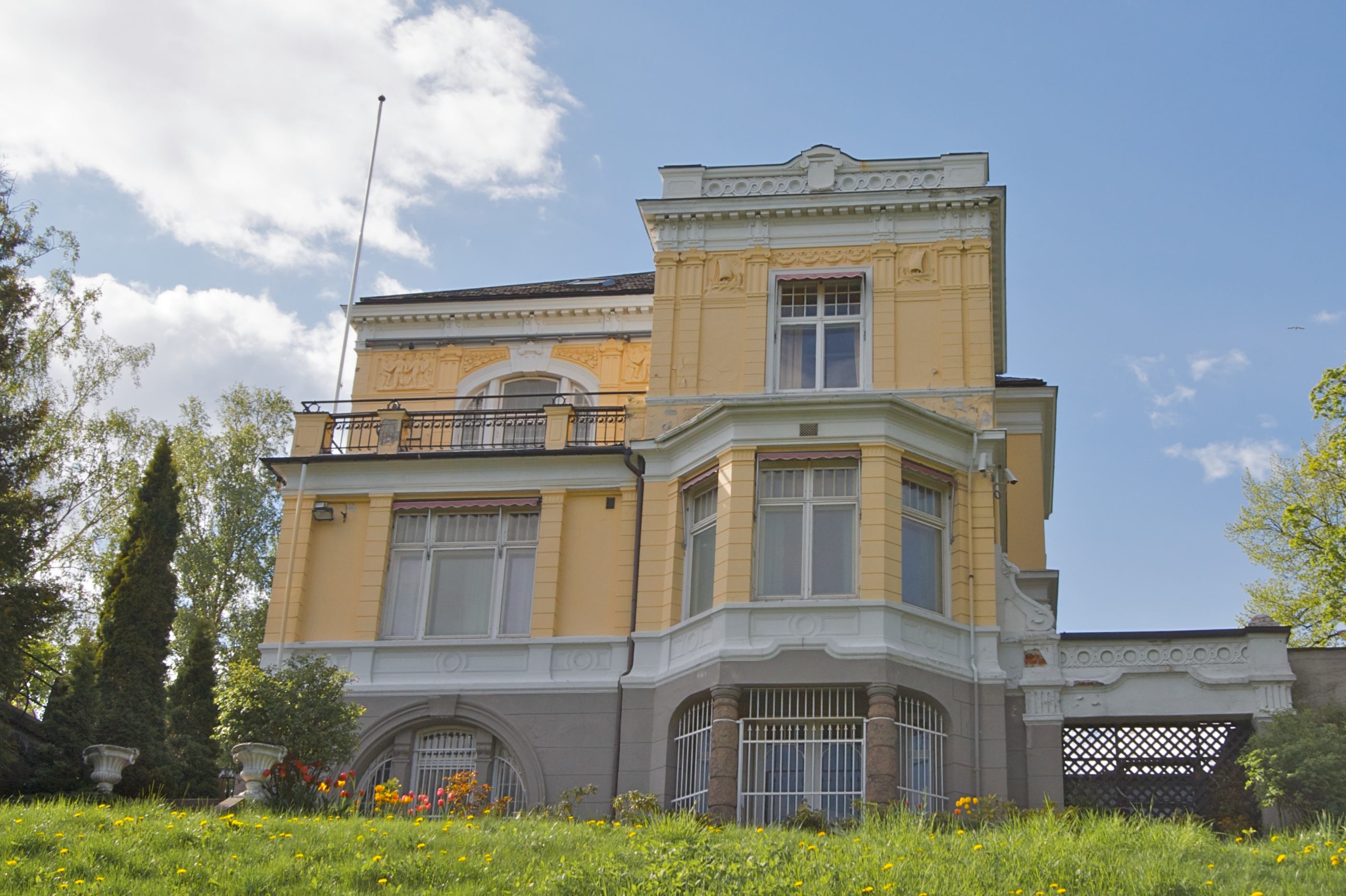
Embassy in Oslo

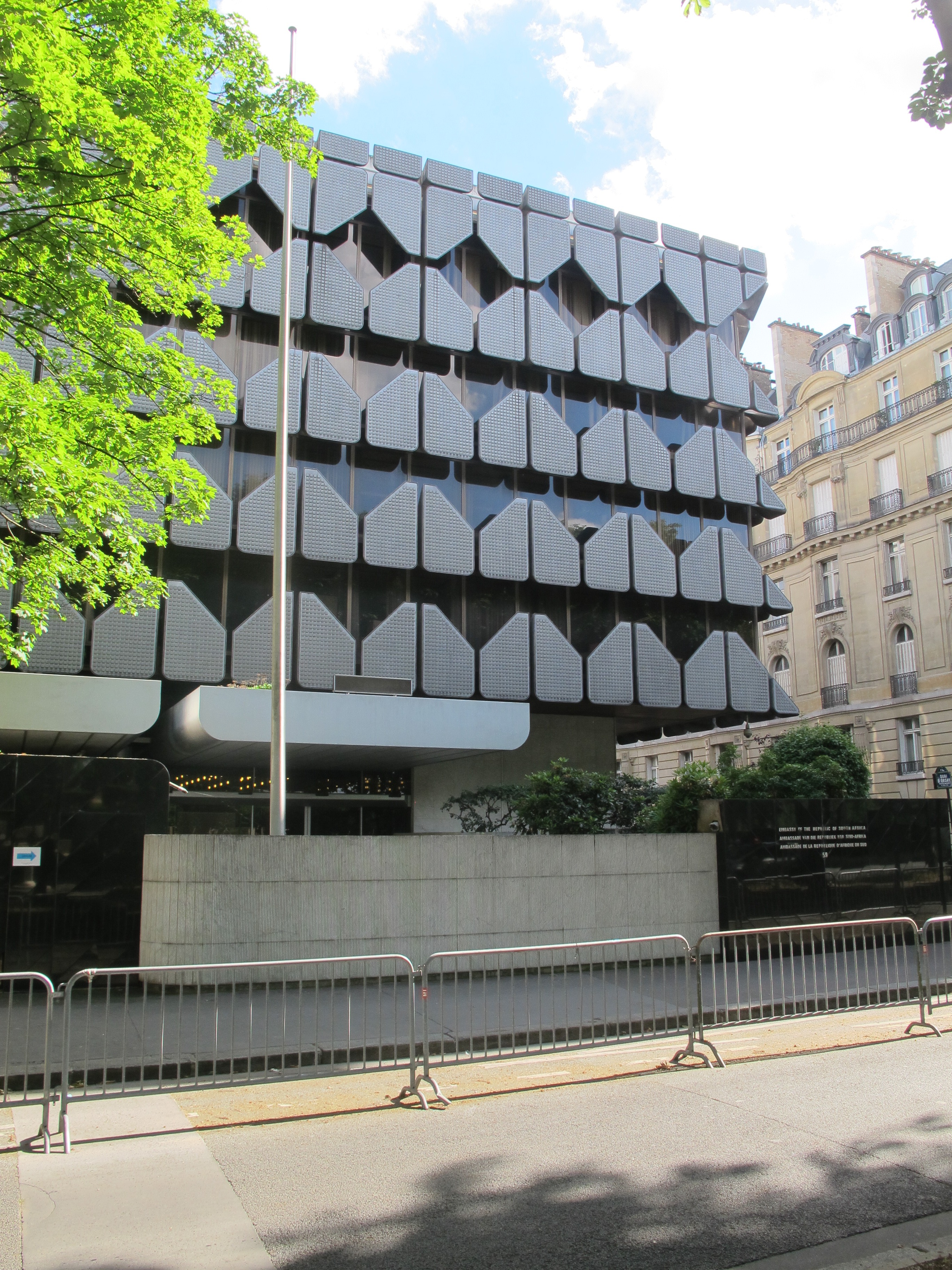
Embassy in Paris

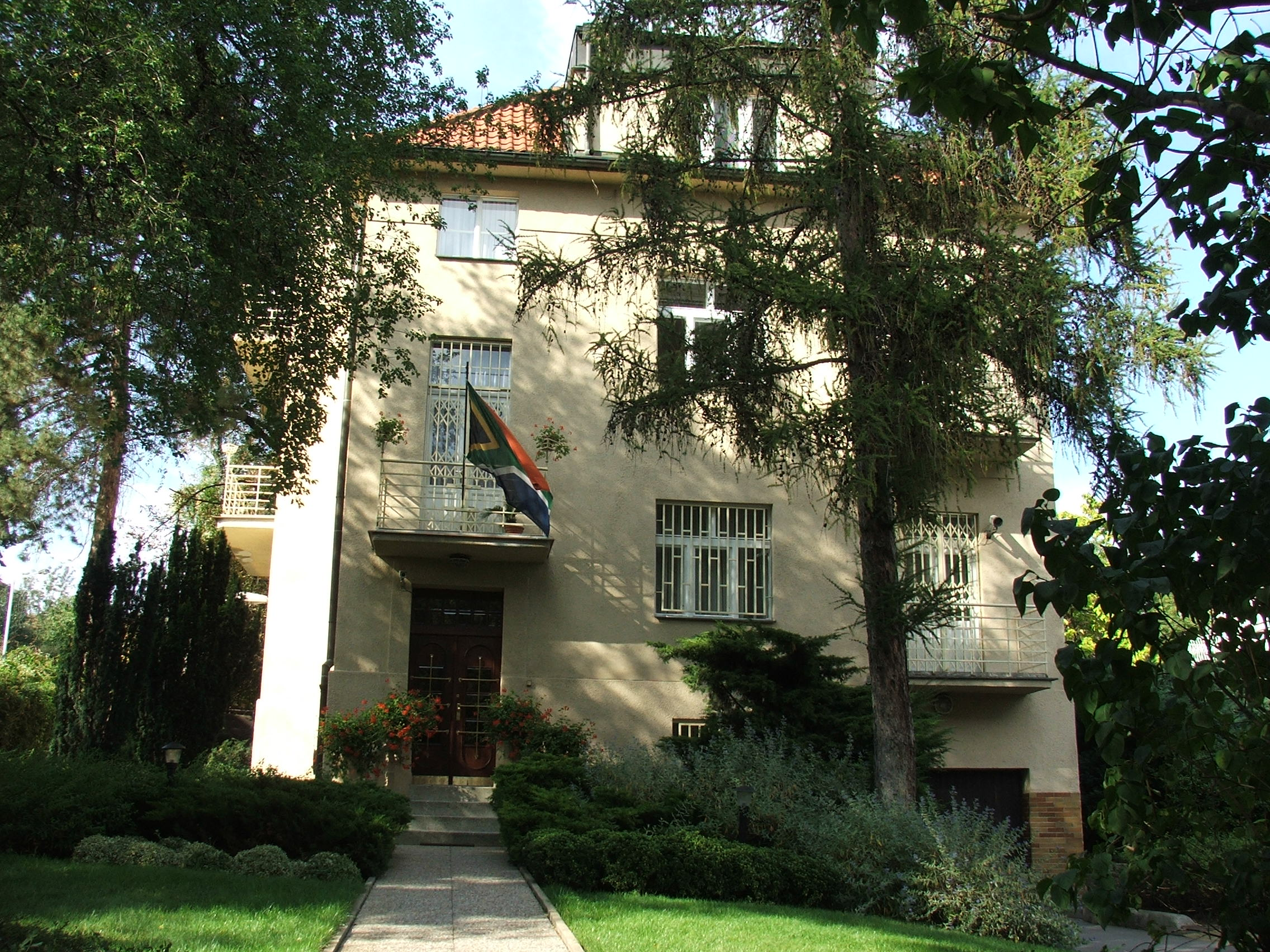
Embassy in Prague

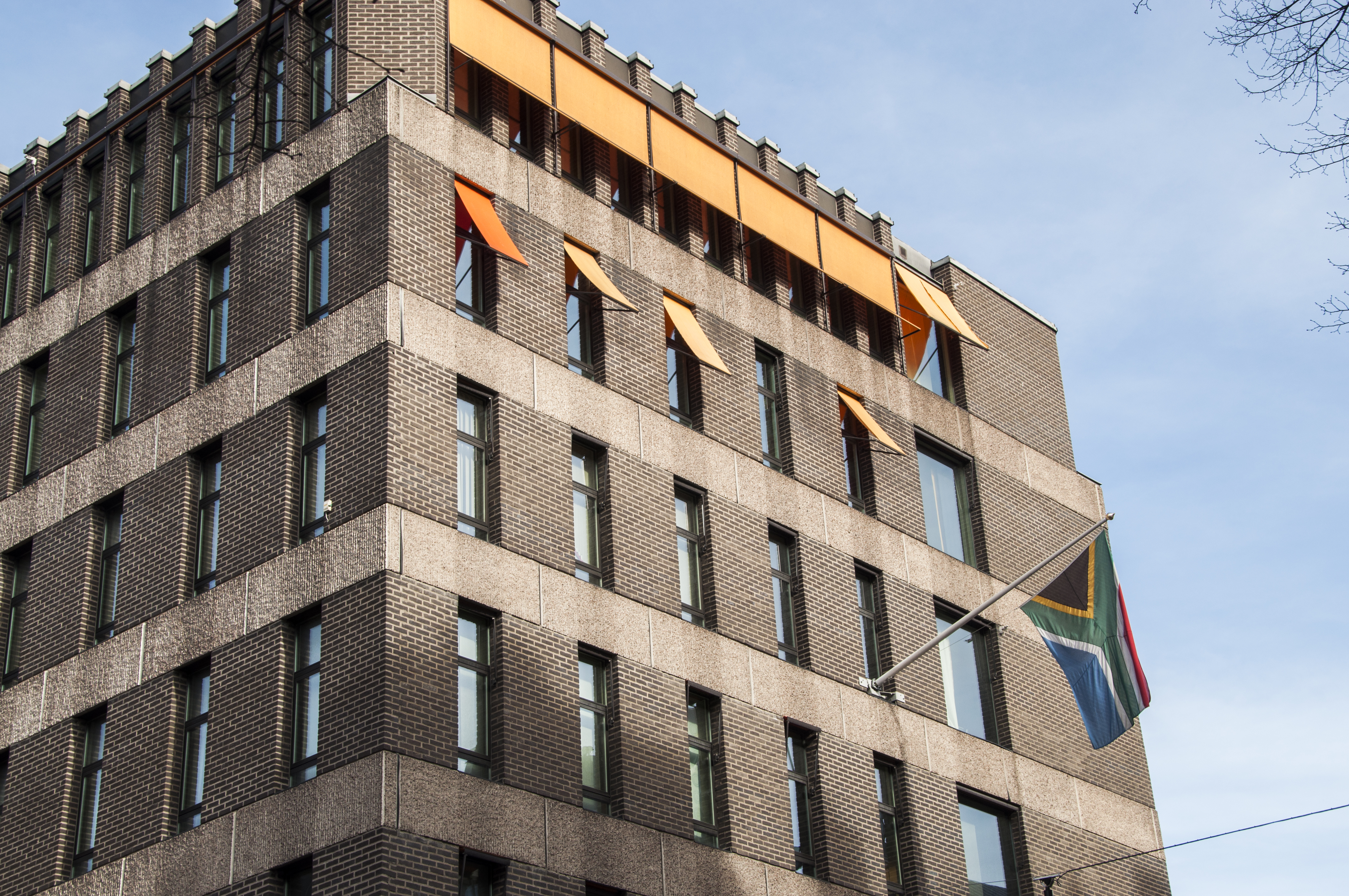
Embassy in Stockholm

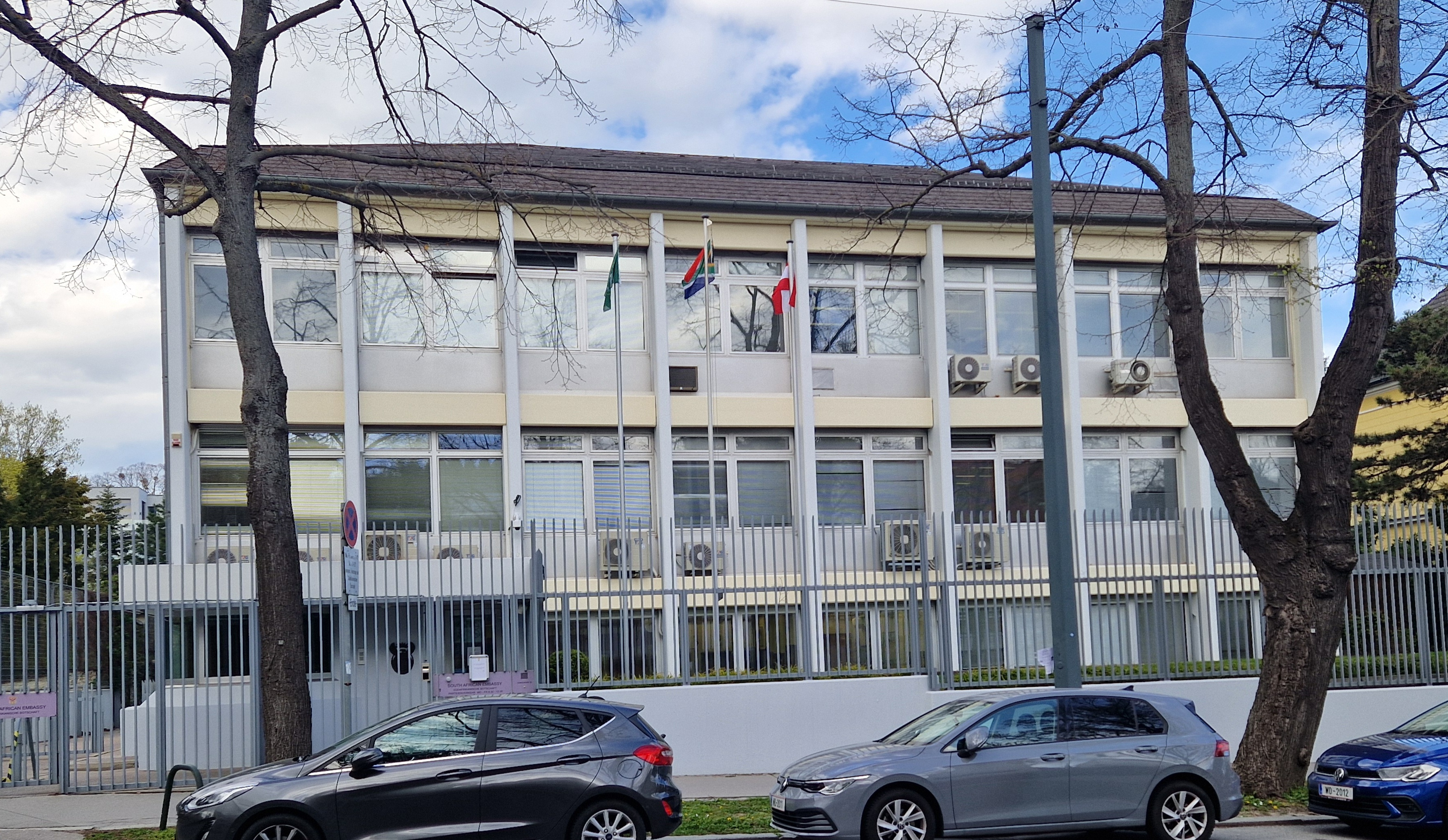
Embassy in Vienna

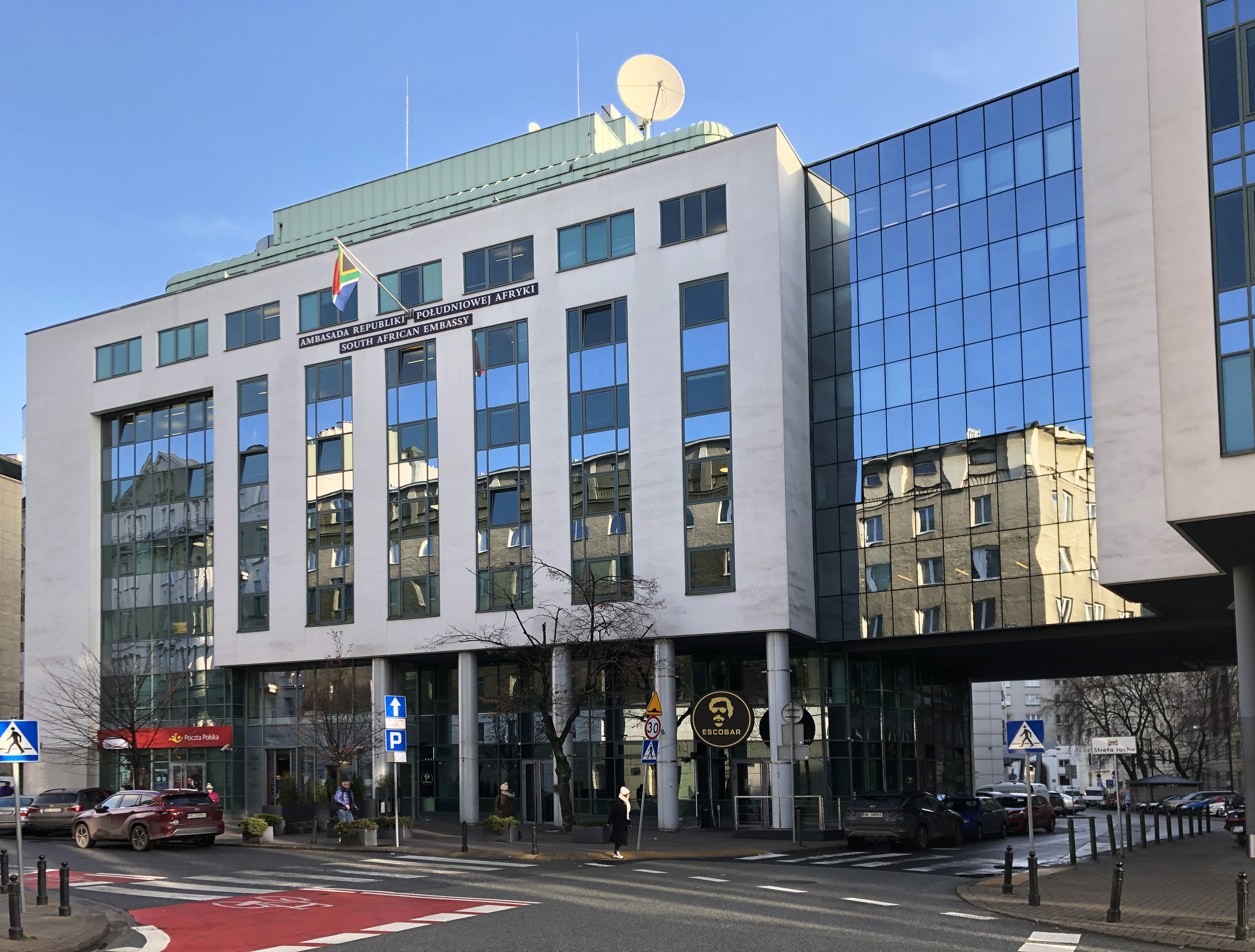
Embassy in Warsaw

=== Oceania ===
Host country	Host city	Mission	Concurrent accreditation	Ref.
Australia	Canberra	High Commission	Countries: Kiribati; Marshall Islands; Micronesia; Nauru; Niue; Papua New Guinea; Solomon Islands; Tonga; Tuvalu	
New Zealand	Wellington	High Commission	Countries: Cook Islands; Fiji; Samoa; Vanuatu	

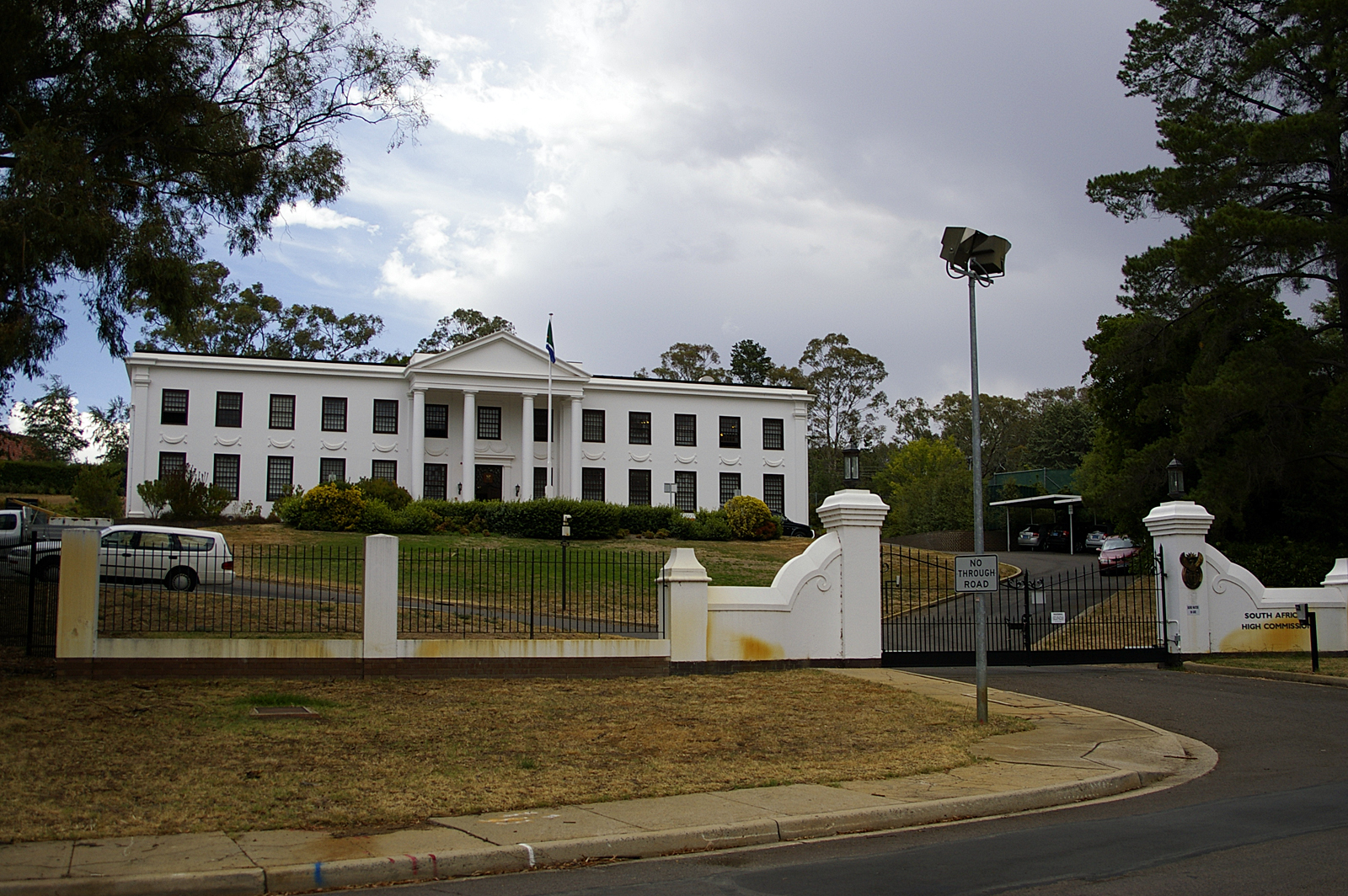
High Commission in Canberra

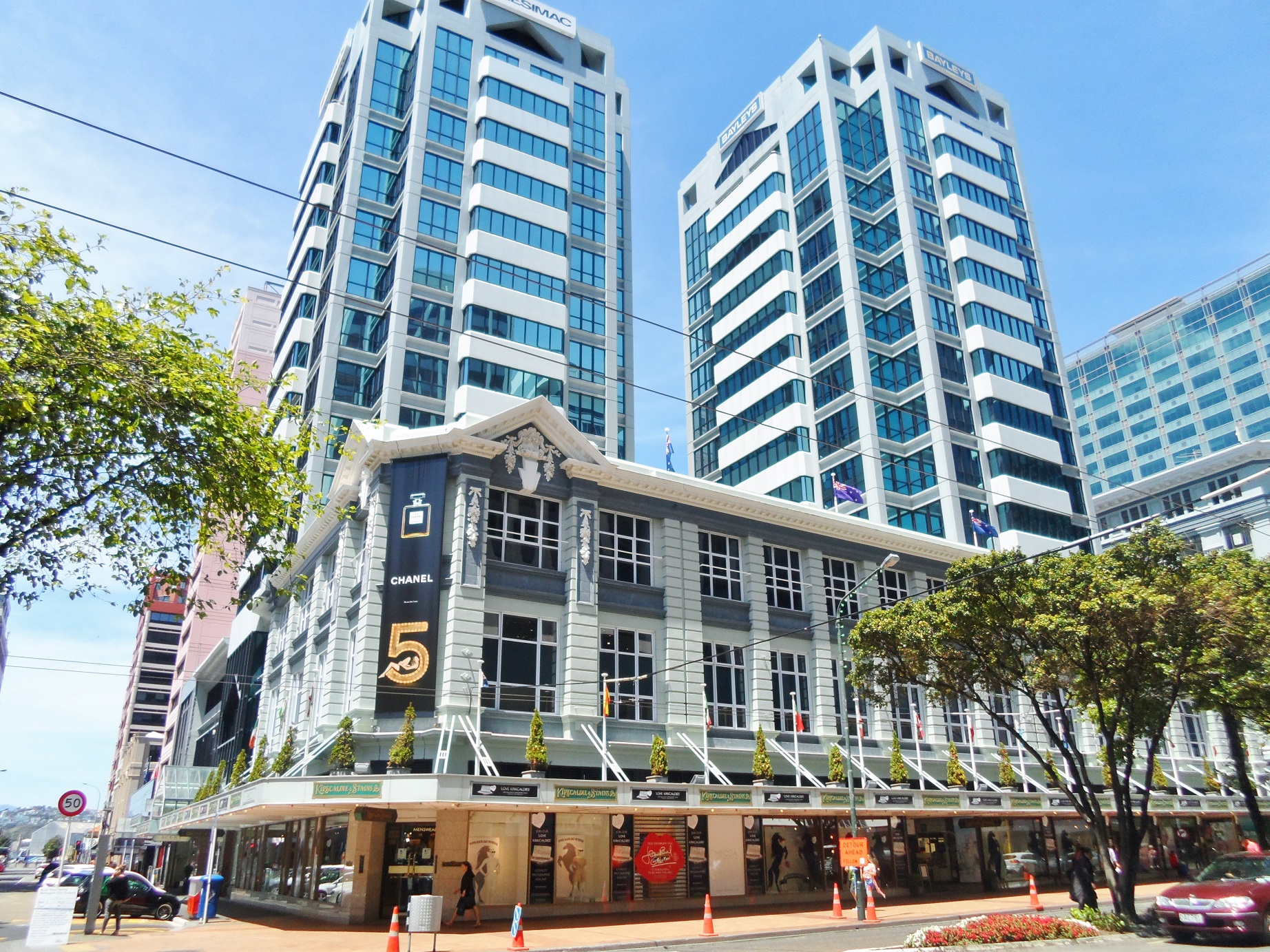
Building hosting the High Commission in Wellington

=== Multilateral organizations ===
Organization	Host city	Host country	Mission	Ref.
United Nations
United Nations	New York City	United States	Permanent Mission	
United Nations	Geneva	Switzerland	Permanent Mission	

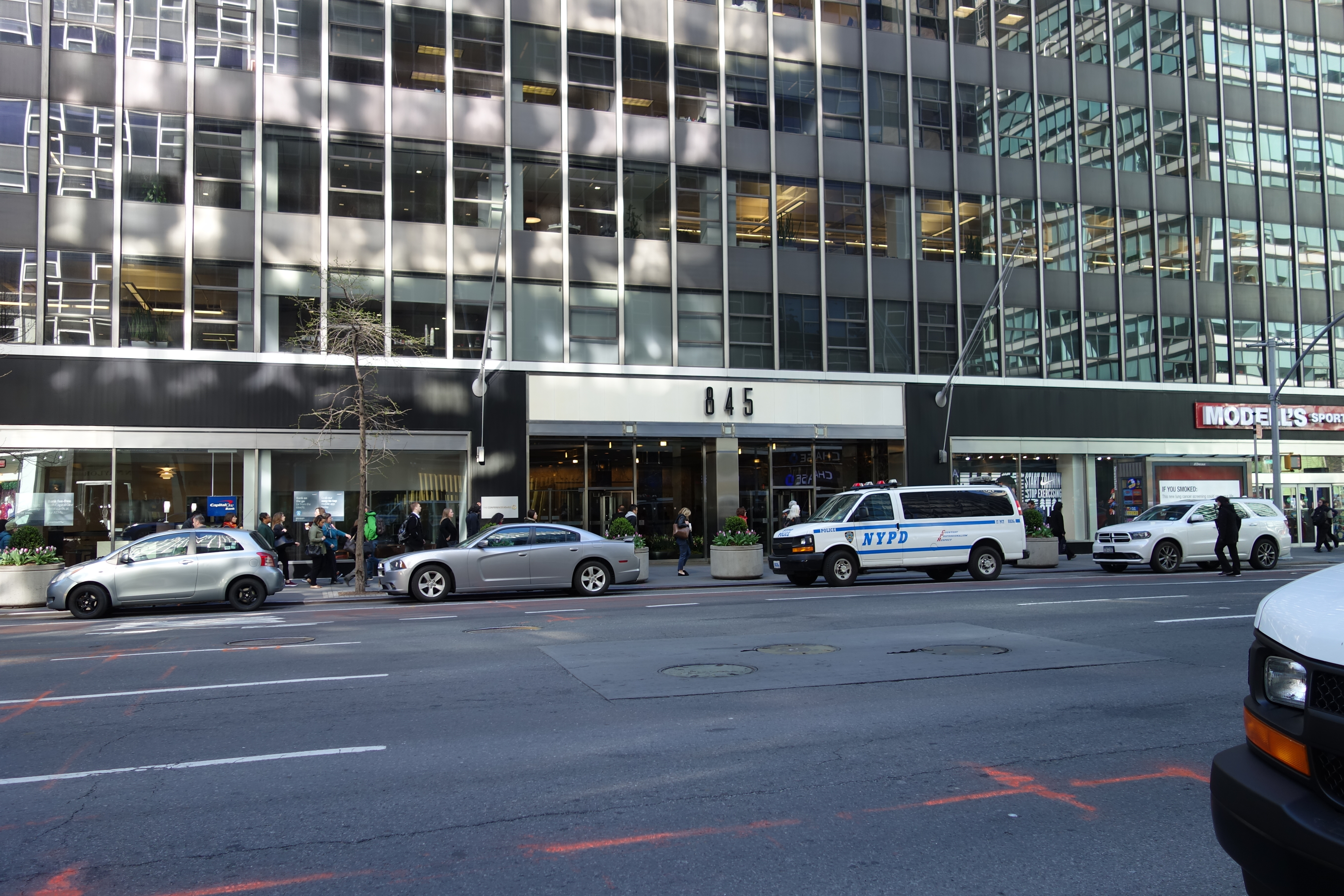
Building hosting the Permanent Mission to the United Nations in New York City

== Closed missions ==
=== Africa ===
Host country	Host city	Mission	Year closed	Ref.
São Tomé and Príncipe	São Tomé	Embassy	2026	
Sudan	Khartoum	Embassy	2023	

=== Americas ===
Host country	Host city	Mission	Year closed	Ref.
Peru	Lima	Embassy	2021	
Trinidad and Tobago	Port of Spain	High Commission	2021	
United States	Chicago	Consulate-General	2021	
Uruguay	Montevideo	Embassy	2016	

=== Asia ===
Host country	Host city	Mission	Year closed	Ref.
Iraq	Baghdad	Embassy	Unknown	
Israel	Tel Aviv	Embassy	2024	
Oman	Muscat	Embassy	2021	
Republic of China (Taiwan)	Taipei	Embassy	1998	

=== Europe ===
Host country	Host city	Mission	Year closed	Ref.
Belarus	Minsk	Embassy	2021	
Bulgaria	Sofia	Embassy	2025	
Finland	Helsinki	Embassy	2021	
Holy See	Rome	Embassy	2021	
Italy	Milan	Consulate-General	2021	
Romania	Bucharest	Embassy	2021	

=== Oceania ===
Host country	Host city	Mission	Year closed	Ref.
Fiji	Suva	High Commission	2021	

== See also ==
- Foreign relations of South Africa
- List of diplomatic missions in South Africa
