= Gauteng Department of Agriculture and Rural Development =

Gauteng Department of Agriculture, Rural Development and Environment

Department overview
- Jurisdiction: Government of Gauteng
- Headquarters: 56 Eloff St, Marshalltown, Johannesburg; 26.20465°S 28.04415°E
- Motto: Growing Gauteng Together
- Employees: 1500+
- Ministers responsible: Vuyiswa Ramokgopa, Gauteng MEC for Agriculture and Rural Development; Ewan Botha, Gauteng MEC for Environment
- Website: www.gauteng.gov.za

The Gauteng Department of Agriculture and Rural Development (GDARDE) is a department of the Gauteng provincial government in South Africa. It is responsible for agricultural affairs within Gauteng. It was formerly known as the Gauteng Department of Agriculture, Conservation and Environment (GDACE).

The Gauteng Department of Environment (GDEnv) is a department of the Gauteng provincial government in South Africa. It is responsible environmental protection and nature conservation within Gauteng.

== Nature reserves managed by The Gauteng Department of Environment ==
- Abe Bailey Nature Reserve
- Alice Glockner Nature Reserve
- Marievale Bird Sanctuary
- Roodeplaat Nature Reserve
- Suikerbosrand Nature Reserve

== GDARD services ==
- Agriculture
- Veterinary services
- Rural Development

== Gauteng Department of Environment Services ==
- Environment
- Conservation
