= Amblyothele ecologica =

Roodeplaat Amblyothele Wolf Spider

Scientific classification
- Kingdom: Animalia
- Phylum: Arthropoda
- Subphylum: Chelicerata
- Class: Arachnida
- Order: Araneae
- Infraorder: Araneomorphae
- Family: Lycosidae
- Genus: Amblyothele
- Species: A. ecologica

Binomial name
- Amblyothele ecologica Russell-Smith, Jocqué & Alderweireldt, 2009

Species of spider

Amblyothele ecologica is a species of spider in the family Lycosidae. It is endemic to South Africa and is commonly known as the Roodeplaat Amblyothele wolf spider.

== Distribution ==
Amblyothele ecologica is known from the South African provinces Gauteng, Limpopo, and Mpumalanga.

== Habitat and ecology ==
The species is a free running ground dweller in Grassland and Savanna biomes at altitudes ranging from 227 to 1559 m. It has also been sampled from tomato fields.

== Conservation ==
Amblyothele ecologica is listed as Least Concern by the South African National Biodiversity Institute due to its wide geographical range. The species is protected in the Lekgalameetse Nature Reserve, Kruger National Park, Klipriviersberg Nature Reserve, and Ben Lavin Nature Reserve.

== Taxonomy ==
The species was described by Russell-Smith, Jocqué and Alderweireldt in 2009 from Roodeplaat in Gauteng. It is known only from the female.
