= 2008 South African municipal by-elections =

A series of South African municipal by-elections was held in 2008 for ward seats on local municipal councils throughout the country. These by-elections were held to replace deceased, resigned or incapacitated councillors.

== January ==
Two seats in one province were up for election on 23 January.

=== KwaZulu-Natal ===
- KZN266 - Ulundi [Ulundi] 52606021 JAPHET MZUKWANE KHANYILE INKATHA FREEDOM PARTY N/A 2699 0 N/A 0 N/A
- KZN283 - Ntambana [Ntambana] 52803004 ZENZELENI JOSIAS BIYELA INKATHA FREEDOM PARTY

== February ==
Two seats in one province were up for election on 13 February.

=== Mpumalanga ===
- MP321 - Thaba Chweu [Sabie] 83201003 PETER JABULANI MAHLANGU AFRICAN NATIONAL CONGRESS
- MP325 - Bushbuckridge [Bushbuckridge] 83205003 CHARLES PROGRESS MONARENG AFRICAN NATIONAL CONGRESS

== 5 March ==
One seat in one province was up for election on 5 March.

=== KwaZulu-Natal ===
- KZN213 - Umzumbe [Umzumbe] 52103007 THEMBELA LAWRENCE PETERS AFRICAN NATIONAL CONGRESS

== 19 March ==
Five seats in one province were up for election on 19 March.

=== Western Cape ===
- WC024 - Stellenbosch [Stellenbosch] 10204017 MARTHA ELIZABETH LINDERS Independent 69.45% 3165 1399 44.2% 21 1.5%
- Western Cape WC053 - Beaufort West [Beaufort West] 10503003 ALIDA CATHERINE ROSY MADUMBO INDEPENDENT CIVIC ORGANISATION OF SOUTH AFRICA 62.97% 3038 1335 43.94% 9 0.67%
- Western Cape WC053 - Beaufort West [Beaufort West] 10503005 ANNA MAANS INDEPENDENT CIVIC ORGANISATION OF SOUTH AFRICA 46.86% 2634 1144 43.43% 13 1.14%
- Western Cape WC053 - Beaufort West [Beaufort West] 10503006 ALOMA DANIELS INDEPENDENT CIVIC ORGANISATION OF SOUTH AFRICA 72.07% 2831 1393 49.21% 11 0.79%
- Western Cape CPT - City of Cape Town [Cape Town] 19100015 JOHN AREND HEUVEL INDEPENDENT DEMOCRATS

== April ==
Five seats in three provinces were up for election on 2 April.

=== Eastern Cape ===
- EC156 - Mhlontlo [Qumbu] 21506016 LUXOLO MANENTSA AFRICAN NATIONAL CONGRESS N/A 4124 0 N/A 0 N/A

=== Free State ===
- Free State FS184 - Matjhabeng [Welkom] 41804036 ANDRÉ STYGER DEMOCRATIC ALLIANCE/DEMOKRATIESE ALLIANSIE 68.85% 6087 2134 35.06% 12 0.56%
- Free State FS203 - Ngwathe [Parys] 42003011 JABULANE ANDREW HLATSHWAYO PAN AFRICANIST CONGRESS OF AZANIA 88% 2974 257 8.64% 7 2.72%

=== KwaZulu-Natal ===
- KwaZulu-Natal KZN282 - uMhlathuze [Richards Bay] 52802024 RAYMOND ZAMA NKWANYANA AFRICAN NATIONAL CONGRESS 70.37% 4015 1650 41.1% 23 1.39%
- KwaZulu-Natal ETH - eThekwini [Durban Metro] 59200026 BRIDGET NTSHANGASE AFRICAN NATIONAL CONGRESS

== 7 May ==
On 7 May, Vusumuzi Moses Ncube of the IFP was elected as councillor for Ward 3 in Mtubatuba (Mtubatuba) – KZ275.

== 21 May ==
11 seats in 6 provinces were up for election on 21 May.

=== Western Cape ===
- WC044 - George [George] LIONEL BERTRAM CHARLES ESAU DEMOCRATIC ALLIANCE/DEMOKRATIESE ALLIANSIE
- WC044 - George [George] BAZIL PETRUS INDEPENDENT DEMOCRATS

=== Eastern Cape ===
- EC122 - Mnquma [Butterworth] VICTOR MXOLI QWABE AFRICAN NATIONAL CONGRESS

=== Northern Cape ===
- NC061 - RICHTERSVELD [Port Nolloth] ELMINA NOMTSHATO HAUSIKU AFRICAN NATIONAL CONGRESS
- NC073 - EMTHANJENI [De Aar] ELIJAH GIDEON HENDRICKS AFRICAN NATIONAL CONGRESS
- NC082 - KAI !GARIB [Keimoes] JOHANNA JUANITA TITUS AFRICAN NATIONAL CONGRESS
- NC083 - KHARA HAIS [Upington] PIET JAKOBUS BRANDT AFRICAN NATIONAL CONGRESS
- NC091 - Sol Plaatje [Kimberley] PETRUS JOHANNES FRANCOIS LOUW DEMOCRATIC ALLIANCE/DEMOKRATIESE ALLIANSIE

=== KwaZulu-Natal ===
- KZN435 - Umzimkhulu [Umzimkulu] ACCADIUS MTHOKOZISI ZULU AFRICAN NATIONAL CONGRESS
- ETH - eThekwini [Durban Metro] ANANDAN NAIDOO MINORITY FRONT

=== North West ===
- NW384 - Ditsobotla [Lichtenburg] 63804005 ANDRÉ BEHM DEMOCRATIC ALLIANCE/DEMOKRATIESE ALLIANSIE

=== Gauteng ===
- Gauteng GT421 - Emfuleni [Vereeniging] 74201016 SUSANNA HENDRINA DE WEERD DEMOCRATIC ALLIANCE

== July ==
On 15 July, a municipal by-election was held in five provinces.

=== Eastern Cape ===
Two wards were contested: In Ward 26 in Qaukeni Municipality [Flagstaff (Ingquza Hill)] – EC153 Sizakele Theophilus Hlongwane of the ANC is the new councillor, while Dean Neville Biddulph of the DA is the new councillor in Ward two in Nelson Mandela Bay Municipality (Port Elizabeth) – NMA.

=== Gauteng ===
Ward 55 in Tshwane Metro (Pretoria) – City of Tshwane Metropolitan Municipality (TSH) was won by Suzette Fourie of the DA.

=== KwaZulu-Natal ===
Ten by-elections were scheduled to take place in KwaZulu-Natal of which only nine took place. The Natal High Court interdicted the holding of the by-election in Ward four in eMadlangeni (Utrecht) – KZN253 on 15 July. The interdict was issued pending the outcome of a Court Application by M. E. Khoza involving the decision by the Executive Council of KwaZulu-Natal to remove him from office as a councillor of the eMadlangeni Municipal Council. Of the nine, eight were won by the IFP and one by the DA.

The new councillor for DA is Anton Michael Raubenheimer in Ward three in Endumeni Local Municipality (Dundee) – KZN241. This ward was previously held by the IFP. The new councillors for the IFP in KwaZulu-Natal are:

- Zwelinjani Henry Magubane in Ward nine in Msunduzi Municipality (Pietermaritzburg) – KZN225
- Themba Amos Radebe in Ward one in Okhahlamba Municipality (Bergville) – KZN235
- Andrias Gcinokwakhe Nhlangothi in Ward five in Okhahlamba Municipality (Bergville) – KZN235
- Samson Mfaniseni Khumalo in Ward eight in Okhahlamba Municipality (Bergville) – KZN235
- Nengani Gladys Buthelezi in Ward 11 in Okhahlamba Municipality (Bergville) – KZN235
- Thamsanqa Maxwell Nzuze in Ward nine in Newcastle Municipality (Newcastle) – KZN252
- Emmanuel Nkosinathi Buthelezi in Ward four in UPhongolo Municipality (Pongola) – KZN262
- Bhekinkosi Edwell Mhlongo in Ward five in Mthonjaneni Municipality (Melmoth) – KZN285

=== Northern Cape ===
Ward two in Moshaweng Municipality (Kgalagadi) – NC451 was won by Kebonye Gladys Gasehete of the African National Congress.

=== Western Cape ===
Ward 103 in City of Cape Town (Cape Town) – CPT was won by Johannes Frederik Hermanus van der Merwe of the DA.

== September ==
Four seats in four provinces were up for election on 10 September:

=== Free State ===
- FS173 - Mantsopa [Ladybrand] MALIMABE PIET NAKALEBE AFRICAN NATIONAL CONGRESS

=== Gauteng ===
- GT483 - Westonaria [Westonaria] SANELE NGWEVENTSHA AFRICAN NATIONAL CONGRESS

=== KwaZulu-Natal ===
- KZN226 - Mkhambathini [Camperdown] SAZISO WANDA AFRICAN NATIONAL CONGRESS

=== Limpopo ===
- LIM332 - Greater Letaba [Duiwelskloof] ULANDA MOKGADI PHEEHA AFRICAN NATIONAL CONGRESS

== 15 October ==
9 seats in 4 provinces were up for election on 15 October.

=== Free State ===
- FS184 - Matjhabeng [Welkom] MIKIE ELIZABETH PHETISE (ANC)

=== Gauteng ===
- EKU - Ekurhuleni [East Rand] SHADI JULIA MASHININI AFRICAN NATIONAL CONGRESS
- JHB - City of Johannesburg [Johannesburg] MMAMADISE CHRISTINA MADISE AFRICAN NATIONAL CONGRESS

=== KwaZulu-Natal ===
- ETH - eThekwini [Durban Metro] Gabriel Cele AFRICAN NATIONAL CONGRESS
- KZN236 - Imbabazane [Loskop] BONGANI PATRICK NDLOVU INKATHA FREEDOM PARTY
- KZN236 - Imbabazane [Loskop] Maxwell Mvelaze INKATHA FREEDOM PARTY
- KZN236 - Imbabazane [Loskop] MBUZELENI CYRIL MKHIZE INKATHA FREEDOM PARTY
- KZN263 - Abaqulusi [Vryheid] SYDNEY MANDLA VILAKAZI INKATHA FREEDOM PARTY

=== Mpumalanga ===
- MP302 - Msukaligwa [Ermelo] BONGINKOSI COLLEN SIBEKO AFRICAN NATIONAL CONGRESS

=== 29 October ===
Three seats in two provinces were up for election on 29 October:

=== Eastern Cape ===
- EC128 - Nxuba [Adelaide] ELLIOT MAKHWENKWE MNQAMISA AFRICAN NATIONAL CONGRESS
- EC154 - Port St Johns [Port St Johns] WISEMAN VUYEKILE JIJIMBA AFRICAN NATIONAL CONGRESS

=== Western Cape ===
- WC041 - Kannaland [Ladismith] JEFFREY DONSON INDEPENDENT CIVIC ORGANISATION OF SOUTH AFRICA

== December ==
On 10 December, a by-election was held in 41 local municipality seats in 5 provinces.

=== By province ===
==== Free State ====
two by-elections took place and both wards were won by the African National Congress:

- Simphiwe Louis Phokwana in Ward 17 in Matjhabeng (Welkom) FS184, and
- Petrus Monyatso Moloedi in Ward 2 in Nketoana (Reitz) FS193

==== Gauteng ====
three by-elections took place.

- Pieter Eksteen van der Watt of the Democratic Alliance won Ward 4 in Nokeng Tsa Taemane (Cullinan)
- Rabatho John Mokotla (ANC) won in Ward 2 in Mogale City (Krugersdorp) GT481
- Joseph Maramane Mogotsi (ANC) in Ward 22 in Tshwane Metro (Pretoria) TSH.

==== KwaZulu-Natal ====
eight by-elections took place in KwaZulu-Natal. The new councillors for the African National Congress are:

- Sithembiso Gumede in Ward 56 in eThekwini (Durban) ETH
- Rommell Winston Jackson in Ward 1 in Mpofana (Mooirivier) KZN223, and
- Malandela Lincoln Mlotshwa in Ward 20 in Emnambithi-Ladysmith (Ladysmith) KZN232
- Lauren Anne de Scally of the Democratic Alliance won in Ward 2 in Umngeni (Howick) KZN222

The Inkatha Freedom Party has four new councillors in KwaZulu-Natal. They are:

- Jeon Zakhe Mabuyakhulu in Ward 16 in Nongoma (Nongoma) KZN265. This ward was uncontested
- Vukani Patrick Langa in Ward 24 in Ulundi (Ulundi) KZN266
- Zethu Betty Ngobe in Ward 12 in Jozini (Mkuze) KZN272
- Zwelithini Sedrick Gumede in Ward 8 in Mandeni (Mandeni) KZN291

==== Northern Cape ====
Ward 5 in Dikgatlong (Barkly West) was won by Naledi Georginah Molete of the African National Congress.

==== Western Cape ====
27 seats were contested in Western Cape province.

===== Cape Town =====
Of the eight wards contested in the City of Cape Town (Cape Town), two went to the Democratic Alliance and six went to independent candidates. They are:

- Monwabisi Godfrey Mbaliswana in Ward 33
- Glenville Bongani Mini in Ward 34
- Boyisile Mafilika in Ward 35
- Xolile Owen Gophe in Ward 52
- Nomamfene Theresa Bottoman in Ward 87, and
- Mzwandile Petterson Matiwane in Ward 88

The new councillors for the Democratic Alliance are –

- Faiza Adams in Ward 45; and
- Natalie Lorraine Bent in Ward 75

===== Rest of province =====
In the rest of the province, the new councillors are: For the African National Congress

- Curnell Nelie Barends in Ward 5 in Breede Valley (Worcester) WC025
- Nceba Sindiliba Ndyalvan in Ward 17 in Breede Valley (Worcester) WC025, and
- Nontembiso Ellen Mpokotye in Ward 10 in Breede River/Winelands (Robertson) WC026

For the Democratic Alliance:

- Judith Mouton in Ward 2 in Cederberg (Citrusdal) WC012
- Koos Brandt in Ward 4 in Cederberg (Citrusdal) WC012
- Quintin Groenewald in Ward 5 in Cederberg (Citrusdal) WC012
- Joyce Ann Kroutz in Ward 26 in Drakenstein (Paarl) WC023
- Frans Albertus Kellerman in Ward 28 in Drakenstein (Paarl) WC023
- Kiro Jacobie Tiemie in Ward 1 in Theewaterskloof (Caledon) WC031
- Samuel Fredericks in Ward 9 in Theewaterskloof (Caledon) WC031

For the Independent Democrats:

- Delina Susan Goedeman in Ward 2 in Matzikama (Vrededal) WC011
- Benjamin van Rooy in Ward 3 in Cederberg (Citrusdal) WC012
- Ruth Belldine Arnolds in Ward 7 in Drakenstein (Paarl) WC023
- Gerald John Witbooi in Ward 30 in Drakenstein (Paarl) WC023
- James Johannes Jacobus Pheiffer in Ward 7 in Theewaterskloof (Caledon) WC031

The following councillors are independent councillors:

- Raynold Mathew van Rooy in Ward 4 in Bergrivier (Velddrif) WC013
- Spasie Nontuthuzelo Kika in Ward 21 in Drakenstein (Paarl) WC023
- Freddie Speelman in Ward 3 in Breede Valley (Worcester) WC025
- Philip Tyira in Ward 16 in Breede Valley (Worcester) WC025

=== Controversy ===
==== ANC barring from ward elections ====
The ANC was barred from fielding candidates in 12 of the 27 seats up for election in Western Cape by the IEC, a decision that was contested by the ANC.

==== Participation of COPE ====
The newly formed COPE party did not field candidates due to it not being formally constituted and registered with the Independent Electoral Commission in time. However, all ten independent councillors who won seats in the Western Cape were also members of the COPE party, and the by-election was seen as the first electoral test for the party.
