= Sheila Peters =

South African politician

Member of the National Assembly of South Africa
- Incumbent
- Assumed office 12 June 2025
- Preceded by: Evangeline Freeman

Member of the Gauteng Provincial Legislature
- In office 14 June 2024 – June 2025

Personal details
- Born: 24 March 1972 (age 54) Eersterust, Pretoria; Transvaal, South Africa
- Party: Patriotic Alliance
- Spouse: Buchanan Peters

Sheila Mary Peters (born 24 March 1972), also spelled Shyla Peters, is a South African politician from Gauteng. A member of the Patriotic Alliance, she served as the province's Member of the Executive Council (MEC) for Environment from July 2024 until June 2025. She joined the Gauteng Executive Council and Gauteng Provincial Legislature after the May 2024 provincial election and was formerly a community activist in Reiger Park.

== Early life and career ==
Peters was born on 24 March 1972 in Eersterust, a township outside Pretoria, where she attended school. She spent most of her adult life in Reiger Park on the East Rand (Ekurhuleni), where she worked in various administrative and sales positions in the private sector, including as a data capturer for FNB. After she was retrenched in 2007, she founded a local transport and tourism company.

== Political career ==
Peters entered politics informally as a community activist in the Reiger Park Community Forum, a civic group dedicated to neighborhood problems like cable theft, power outages, substance abuse, and poverty. Ahead of the August 2021 local elections, she and other forum members collaborated with the Patriotic Alliance (PA), a national political party, as supporters of the PA's successful campaign to elect Edith Klaasen as ward councillor in Reiger Park. Thereafter Peters became regional treasurer of the PA's Ekurhuleni branch.

In the next provincial election in May 2024, Peters was one of two PA candidates elected to the Gauteng Provincial Legislature; she was ranked sixth on the PA's provincial party list. Gauteng premier Panyaza Lesufi of the African National Congress (ANC) appointed her to the Gauteng Executive Council in July after the PA agreed to support an ANC-led minority government in the provincial legislature. She was named Member of the Executive Council (MEC) for Environment, a newly created position. Peters resigned from the provincial government and provincial legislature and was succeeded by Ewan Botha.

== Personal life ==
Her husband, Buchanan Peters, had a long career at Eskom before he entered the private sector to run construction businesses. They have two adult children, a son and a daughter.

The family moved from Reiger Park to Boksburg West shortly before the 2024 election. Peters owns nine houses in Gauteng, spread across Reiger Park, Boksburg, Brakpan, and Pretoria.
