= Ramokgopa =

Ramokgopa is a surname. Notable people with the surname include:

- Gwen Ramokgopa, South African politician
- Kgosientsho Ramokgopa (born 1975), South African politician
- Maropene Ramokgopa (born 1979), South African politician
- Tumi Ramokgopa (born 2007), South African hurdler
- Vuyiswa Ramokgopa, South African politician
