= Kungwini Local Municipality =

Coordinates: 25.8050°S 28.7464°E

- Local municipality
- Location in Gauteng
- Country: South Africa
- Province: Gauteng
- District: Metsweding District
- Seat: Bronkhorstspruit

Area
  - Total: 2,202 km^{2} (850 sq mi)

Population (2007)
  - Total: 104,149
  - Density: 47.30/km^{2} (122.5/sq mi)
  - Households: 31 665

Racial makeup (2007)
  - Black African: 84.03%
  - White: 14.12%
  - Coloured: 1.59%
  - Indian or Asian: 0.26%
- Time zone: UTC+2 (SAST)
- Municipal code: GT462

Kungwini Local Municipality was a local municipality in the Metsweding District of Gauteng in South Africa. The town of Bronkhorstspruit was the seat of the municipality.

Kungwini, along with the Metsweding District, was disestablished and absorbed into the Tshwane Metropolitan Municipality on 18 May 2011, the date of the 2011 municipal election.

Kungwini is an isiNdebele word meaning "mist". Because the area is misty, the name was relevant for the local community.

== Main places ==
Main places of the municipality, from the 2001 census:

Place	Code	Most spoken language
Bronkhorstspruit	78201	Afrikaans
Ekandustria	78202	Northern Sotho
Ekangala	88201	Zulu
Kungwini Part 1	88202	
Kungwini Part 2	78203	Southern Ndebele
Pretoria	78204	Setswana
Rethabiseng	78205	Zulu
Sehlakwana	78206	Southern Ndebele
Zithobeni	78207	Southern Ndebele
