= Ewan Botha =

South African politician

Ewan Botha MPL

Member of the Executive Council of Gauteng for Environment
- Incumbent
- Assumed office 25 June 2025
- Premier: Panyaza Lesufi
- Preceded by: Sheila Peters

Member of the Gauteng Provincial Legislature
- Incumbent
- Assumed office 25 June 2025

Personal details
- Born: 14 March 1993 (age 33) Johannesburg, Gauteng
- Education: University of Pretoria
- Profession: Politician

Ewan Botha (born 14 March 1993) is a South African politician who has been Gauteng's Member of the Executive Council for Environment and a Member of the Gauteng Provincial Legislature for the Patriotic Alliance since June 2025. He succeeded Sheila Peters, who the party had decided to redeploy to the National Assembly of South Africa.

Botha studied law at the University of Pretoria and is pursuing his MBA at Regenesys Business School.
