= Amblyothele =

Scientific classification
- Kingdom: Animalia
- Phylum: Arthropoda
- Subphylum: Chelicerata
- Class: Arachnida
- Order: Araneae
- Infraorder: Araneomorphae
- Family: Lycosidae
- Genus: Amblyothele; Simon

Species
- 8, see text

Genus of spiders

Amblyothele is an African genus of wolf spiders in the family Lycosidae, with eight described species. It was first described in 1910 by Eugène Simon.

== Description ==
Small wolf spiders with males measuring 3.08-4.17 mm and females 3.33-5.17 mm. The carapace lacks a distinct pattern, sometimes with a pale median band and darker striae radiating from the fovea.

The anterior eye row is either straight or more often recurved. The anterior median eyes are equal to twice the diameter of the anterior lateral eyes. The chelicerae are pale, mottled or streaked with grey, and clothed in long dark setae. The posterior margin has two teeth, and the anterior margin normally has three minute teeth. The sternum is pale, scutiform, and moderately to strongly produced between the hind coxae with a scattering of dark setae.

The abdomen is pale yellow to brown, sometimes suffused with grey and usually with a paler dorsal folium. In some species there is a row of four paired pale white spots. Males lack a dorsal scutum. The dorsal surface is sometimes clothed in dark hairs while the venter is pale yellow to white. The spinnerets are long, with the anterior lateral spinneret twice the length of the anterior median spinneret and clearly three-segmented.

The legs are pale yellow to pale brown and clothed in short adpressed setae. All leg spines are long, thin and pale. Leg IV is longer than leg I. The ventral spines of leg I normally have three pairs on the tibia and three on the metatarsus, with distal pairs normally reduced in size. The tarsi have three claws.

== Lifestyle ==
Species in this genus are free-running ground dwellers frequently sampled from pitfall traps.

== Taxonomy ==
The genus was revised by Russell-Smith, Jocqué and Alderweireldt in 2009.

== Species ==
As of October 2025, this genus includes eight species:

- Amblyothele albocincta Simon, 1910 – Botswana, South Africa (type species)
- Amblyothele atlantica Russell-Smith, Jocqué & Alderweireldt, 2009 – Cameroon
- Amblyothele ecologica Russell-Smith, Jocqué & Alderweireldt, 2009 – South Africa
- Amblyothele hamatula Russell-Smith, Jocqué & Alderweireldt, 2009 – Ivory Coast
- Amblyothele kivumba Russell-Smith, Jocqué & Alderweireldt, 2009 – Rwanda
- Amblyothele latedissipata Russell-Smith, Jocqué & Alderweireldt, 2009 – Tanzania, Mozambique, South Africa
- Amblyothele longipes Russell-Smith, Jocqué & Alderweireldt, 2009 – Ivory Coast, Togo
- Amblyothele togona Roewer, 1960 – Ivory Coast, Cameroon, Togo, DR Congo, Kenya
