= Bronkhorstspruit =

Bronkhorstspruit (eKungwini)
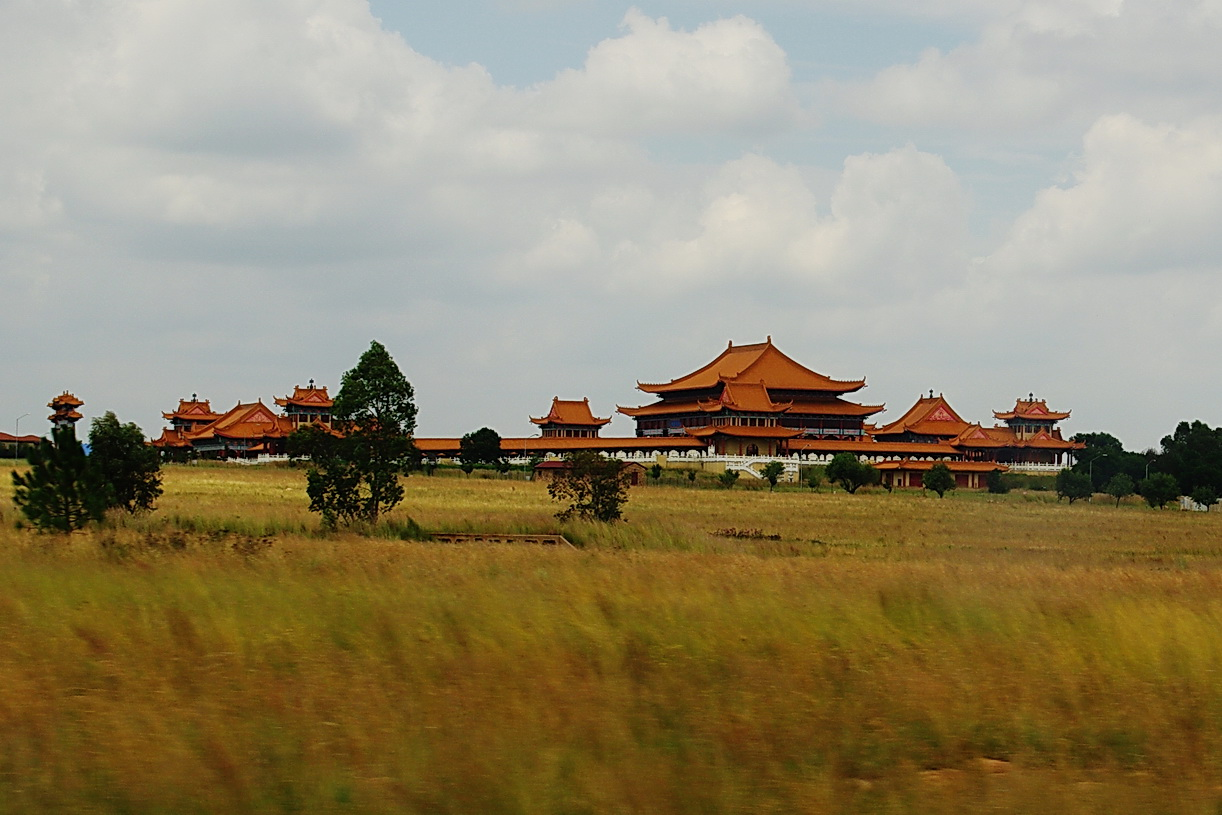
- The Nan Hua Temple Complex in Bronkhorstspruit

- Location within Gauteng Location within South Africa Location within Africa
- Coordinates: 25°48′18″S 28°44′47″E
- Country: South Africa
- Province: Gauteng
- Municipality: City of Tshwane

Area
  - Total: 3.11 km^{2} (1.20 sq mi)
- Elevation: 1,375 m (4,511 ft)

Population (2011)
  - Total: 3,720
  - Density: 1,200/km^{2} (3,100/sq mi)
- Time zone: UTC+2 (SAST)
- Postal code (street): 1020
- PO box: 1020
- Area code: 013

Bronkhorstspruit (eKungwini) is a town 50 km east of Pretoria, Gauteng, South Africa along the N4 highway towards eMalahleni. It also includes three townships called Zithobeni, Rethabiseng and Ekangala. On 18 May 2011, the Tshwane Metropolitan Municipality took over the municipal administration from the abolished Kungwini Local Municipality, which makes Bronkhorstspruit part of Tshwane.

== History ==
In 1858, a group of Voortrekkers settled beside the Bronkhorst Spruit creek, which was originally called Kalkoenkransrivier ('turkey cliff river'). The town was laid out on land of the farm Hondsrivier in 1904 owned by C.J.G. Erasmus and was initially named after him. It adopted the name Bronkhorstspruit in 1935.

On 20 December 1880 it was the scene of the Battle of Bronkhorstspruit, an important event in the early days of the First Boer War when a Boer Commando ambushed a British army column, 94th Regiment of Foot, near the present town en route from Lydenburg to Pretoria.

During the Second Boer War (1899–1902), the British army established a concentration camp for Black people at Bronkhorstspruit.

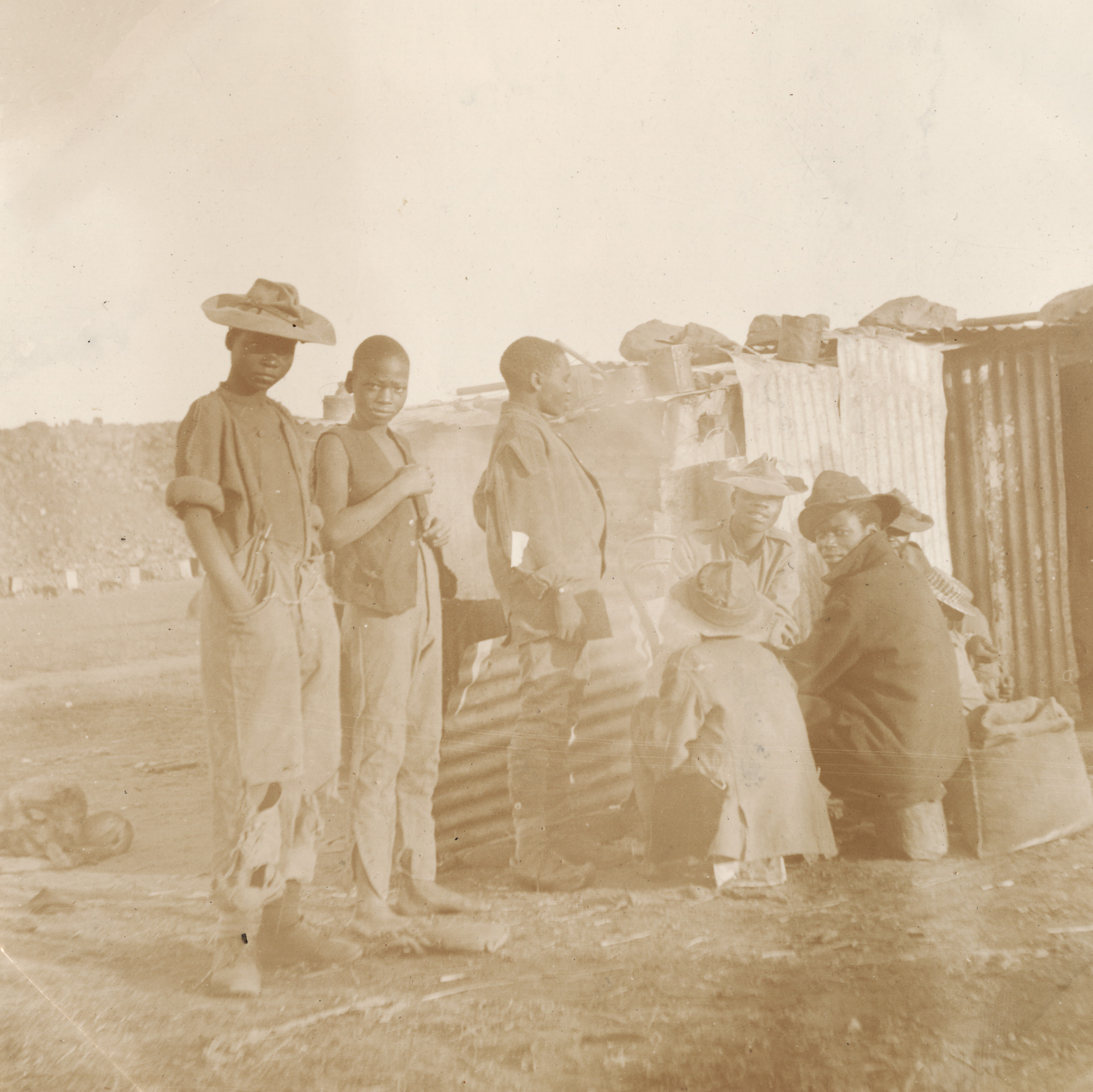
Black people in the British concentration camp at Bronkhorstspruit in 1901

There is disagreement about where the town got its name from. Some believe it was named after the farmer J.G. Bronkhorst, while others say that it was named after the plant, bronkors (Afrikaans for watercress), that grew in the region of the creek.

The native name for the place is eKungwini. the name "eKungwini/ Kungwini is an IsiNdebele name for "where there is mist" derived from 'Ikungu'(mist). Before 2011, the municipality in Bronkhorstspruit was named by Kungwini Local Municipality, before it got disestablished and got absorbed into Tshwane Metropolitan Municipality. However, other Ndebele people say the native name for the place is KwaMarhinini. Furthermore, many Ndebele people who stayed in the place used to call this place by eburothweni obukhulu (where there is a big bread).

Bronkhorstspruit was the seat of the Metsweding District Municipality as well as the Kungwini Local Municipality. Then, on the day of South Africa's 2011 general elections (18 May 2011), the entire Metsweding District ceased to be its own municipality and became part of the Tshwane Metropolitan Municipality.

== Parks and greenspace ==
Ten kilometers to the south of the town lies the Bronkhorstspruit Dam.

== Suburbs ==
- Erasmus
- Masada
- Riamar Park
- Bester Park
- Cultura Park
- Bronkhorstbaai

== Economy ==
=== Agriculture ===
Being an agricultural area, maize, sorghum, groundnuts, sunflower seeds, sheep and cattle are grown and raised.

=== Mining ===
Fire clay is as well as coal mined in the area.

== Places of interest ==
Cultura Park, a suburb of Bronkhorstspruit, hosts the largest Buddhist temple in Africa. Nan Hua Temple houses the South African headquarters of the Fo Guang Shan sect, a Humanistic Buddhist order.
