= Amblyothele latedissipata =

Tanzania Amblyothele Wolf Spider

Scientific classification
- Kingdom: Animalia
- Phylum: Arthropoda
- Subphylum: Chelicerata
- Class: Arachnida
- Order: Araneae
- Infraorder: Araneomorphae
- Family: Lycosidae
- Genus: Amblyothele
- Species: A. latedissipata

Binomial name
- Amblyothele latedissipata Russell-Smith, Jocqué & Alderweireldt, 2009

Species of spider

Amblyothele latedissipata is a species of spider in the family Lycosidae. It is commonly known as the Tanzania Amblyothele wolf spider.

== Distribution ==
Amblyothele latedissipata is known from Mozambique, Tanzania, and South Africa.

In South Africa, the species is recorded from the provinces Eastern Cape, KwaZulu-Natal, Limpopo, and Western Cape.

== Habitat and ecology ==
The species is a free-running ground dweller sampled from Fynbos, Grassland, Savanna, and Succulent Karoo biomes at altitudes ranging from 1 to 1245 m.

== Conservation ==
Amblyothele latedissipata is listed as Least Concern by the South African National Biodiversity Institute due to its wide geographical range. It is protected in eight protected areas including Addo Elephant National Park, Swartberg Nature Reserve, Mkambati Nature Reserve, Ndumo Game Reserve, Tembe Elephant Park, Ithala Nature Reserve, and Alverstone Nature Reserve.

== Taxonomy ==
Amblyothele latedissipata was described by Russell-Smith, Jocqué and Alderweireldt in 2009 from Tanzania. It is known from both sexes.
