= Vuyiswa Ramokgopa =

National chairperson of newly established South African Political Party RISE Mzansi

Vuyiswa Ramokgopa MPL

Member of the Gauteng Executive Council for Economic Development and Agriculture and Rural Development (Formerly Agriculture and Rural Development: 2024–2026)
- Incumbent
- Assumed office 3 July 2024
- Premier: Panyaza Lesufi
- Preceded by: Office established

Member of the Gauteng Provincial Legislature
- Incumbent
- Assumed office 14 June 2024

Personal details
- Party: RISE Mzansi
- Education: University of Cape Town (BCom)

Vuyiswa Ramokgopa (born Vuyiswa Mutshekwane) is a South African politician, entrepreneur and businessperson who is the Member of the Executive Council (MEC) for Agriculture and Rural Development and a member of the Gauteng Provincial Legislature for RISE Mzansi, of which she is the national chairperson. She has worked in the retail, marketing and design, events management and property investment industries. She is also the chairperson of the National Property Practitioners Council.

== Early life ==
Vuyiswa Ramokgopa was born in Johannesburg, Gauteng. She is one of three children and was raised by her parents, Leslie Mongezi Mutshekwane, a retired actor who starred in the films Goodbye Bafana (2007), Damned River (1989), and Mercenary Fighters (1988), and Gloria Mosia, an entrepreneur who is the Managing Director of Sonocreatives Pty Ltd.

She attended primary school at Micklefield School in Rondebosch, Cape Town, and St. Cyprian's School in Vredehoek, Cape Town, and went on to attend secondary school at the International School of Dakar in Senegal. She then came back to South Africa to complete high school at St. Mary's DSG in Pretoria and Crawford College in Sandton.

== Education ==
Vuyiswa Ramokgopa studied a Bachelor of Commerce in Politics, Philosophy and Economics at the University of Cape Town and completed Executive Programs at GIBS and Oxford University.

== Business career ==
Ramokgopa was the Sales and Marketing Manager at KISUA, a unique African fashion company, and the director and co-founder of The Other Girls, an events and lifestyle company, from 2012 to 2016. She is the former Chief Executive Officer of the South African Institute of Black Property Practitioners (SAIBPP) and founded AWiP Investments, a majority African women-owned and managed broad-based property investment fund based in South Africa.

== RISE Mzansi ==
In April 2023, Ramokgopa co-founded the social democratic political party Rise Mzansi, becoming its first national chaiperson. The party contested the 2024 South African general election. Ramokgopa was initially the party's National Coordinator before becoming their candidate for Premier of Gauteng.

== Gauteng government ==
Rise Mzansi won one seat in the Gauteng Provincial Legislature, and Ramokgopa was selected to represent the party in the legislature. The ANC had lost its majority in the province and ANC premier Panyaza Lesufi then sought to form a "Provincial Government of Unity" with other parties.

On 3 July 2024, Lesufi announced his Executive Council which saw Ramokgopa appointed as the MEC for Rural Development and Agriculture.

In her new role, Ramokgopa said that she will prioritize ending hunger in the province, reducing food waste, and ensuring sustainable, localised production of food. She plans to focus on growing the base of small-scale farmers and supporting the urban farming economy in Gauteng. Ramokgopa emphasised the need for cross-departmental collaboration and cooperation at the provincial, national, and local levels to achieve these goals.

Despite her management experience, stakeholders in agriculture in the province have noted that the fact that she did not have background in the sector may be a challenge, while expressing readiness to work with her to "solve the problems facing agriculture in Gauteng".

On 1 April 2026, Lesufi announced that Ramokgopa would lead the Department of Economic Development, in addition to the Rural Development and Agriculture Department.

== Personal life ==
Vuyiswa Ramokgopa is married to Matome Mathabatha Ramokgopa. She has three children.
