= Zithobeni =

- Location within Gauteng Location within South Africa
- Coordinates: 25.783°S 28.721°E
- Country: South Africa
- Province: Gauteng
- Municipality: City of Tshwane

Area
  - Total: 3.86 km^{2} (1.49 sq mi)

Population (2011)
  - Total: 22,434
  - Density: 5,810/km^{2} (15,100/sq mi)

Racial makeup (2011)
  - Black African: 97.2%
  - Coloured: 1.1%
  - Indian/Asian: 0.2%
  - Other: 1.5%

First languages (2011)
  - S. Ndebele: 29.6%
  - Zulu: 27.9%
  - Northern Sotho: 13.2%
  - Sotho: 5.9%
  - Other: 23.3%
- Time zone: UTC+2 (SAST)
- Postal code (street): 1024
- PO box: 1024

Zithobeni (a Zulu word meaning humble yourselves) is a township situated in Gauteng, South Africa, just north of Bronkhorstspruit and south-east of Ekangala.
