= Amblyothele albocincta =

White-spotted Amblyothele Wolf Spider

Scientific classification
- Kingdom: Animalia
- Phylum: Arthropoda
- Subphylum: Chelicerata
- Class: Arachnida
- Order: Araneae
- Infraorder: Araneomorphae
- Family: Lycosidae
- Genus: Amblyothele
- Species: A. albocincta

Binomial name
- Amblyothele albocincta Simon, 1910

Species of spider

Amblyothele albocincta is a species of spider in the family Lycosidae. It is commonly known as the white-spotted Amblyothele wolf spider.

== Distribution ==
Amblyothele albocincta is known from Botswana and South Africa. In South Africa, the species has been identified from the Northern Cape and the Free State.

== Habitat and ecology ==
The species is a free running ground dweller sampled from the Grassland Biome at altitudes ranging from 1,172 to 1,391 m.

== Description ==
The species has a row of four paired pale white spots on the dorsal surface.

== Conservation ==
Amblyothele albocincta is listed as Least Concern by the South African National Biodiversity Institute due to its wide geographical range. It is protected in the Erfenisdam Nature Reserve, Willem Pretorius Nature Reserve, Sandveld Nature Reserve, Bloemfontein Botanical Gardens, Amanzi Private Game Reserve, and Benfontein Game Reserve.

== Taxonomy ==
The species was described by Simon in 1910 from Botswana. It is known from both sexes.
