= Metsweding District Municipality =

- Former District municipality
- Location in Gauteng
- Coordinates: 25°48′S 28°45′E
- Country: South Africa
- Province: Gauteng
- Seat: Bronkhorstspruit
- Local municipalities: List: Nokeng Tsa Taemane; Kungwini

Racial makeup

Languages
- Time zone: UTC+2 (South African Standard Time)
- Municipal code: DC46
- Website: www.metsweding.com

Metsweding District Municipality was, from 2000 until 18 May 2011, a district municipality in Gauteng province, South Africa. Metsweding, and its component local municipalities, was disestablished and absorbed into the Tshwane Metropolitan Municipality on the date of the 2011 municipal election.

The administrative seat of Metsweding was Bronkhorstspruit. The most spoken languages of its 159 861 people were IsiNdebele and Afrikaans (2001 Census).

== Geography ==
=== Neighbours ===
Metsweding was surrounded by:

- Waterberg (DC36) to the north
- Nkangala (DC31) to the east
- Ekurhuleni (East Rand) to the south-west
- Bojanala Platinum (DC36) to the north-west
- Tshwane (Pretoria) to the west, into which it was merged

=== Local municipalities ===
The district contained the following local municipalities, which have also been abolished:

Local municipality	Population	%
Kungwini	107 320	67.13%
Nokeng tsa Taemane	52 591	32.90%

== Demographics ==
The following statistics are from the 2001 census.

Language	Population	%
IsiNdebele	32 146	20.11%
Afrikaans	30 757	19.24%
Sepedi	29 596	18.51%
IsiZulu	26 526	16.59%
Sesotho	9 502	5.94%
Setswana	7 428	4.65%
Xitsonga	7 178	4.49%
English	5 372	3.36%
SiSwati	4 963	3.10%
IsiXhosa	3 620	2.26%
Tshivenda	1 665	1.04%
Other	1 158	0.72%

=== Gender ===
Gender	Population	%
Male	83 801	52.42%
Female	76 060	47.58%

=== Ethnic group ===
Ethnic group	Population	%
Black African	124 713	78.01%
White	32 943	20.61%
Coloured	1 930	1.21%
Indian/Asian	275	0.17%

=== Age ===
Age	Population	%
000 - 004	14 549	9.10%
005 - 009	13 841	8.66%
010 - 014	13 421	8.40%
015 - 019	13 998	8.76%
020 - 024	15 914	9.95%
025 - 029	17 830	11.15%
030 - 034	15 898	9.94%
035 - 039	14 070	8.80%
040 - 044	10 920	6.83%
045 - 049	8 528	5.33%
050 - 054	6 501	4.07%
055 - 059	4 626	2.89%
060 - 064	3 601	2.25%
065 - 069	2 263	1.42%
070 - 074	1 717	1.07%
075 - 079	1 036	0.65%
080 - 084	772	0.48%
085 - 089	204	0.13%
090 - 094	112	0.07%
095 - 099	40	0.03%
100 plus	20	0.01%

== Politics ==
=== Election results ===
Election results for Metsweding in the South African general election, 2004.

- Population 18 and over: 109 820 [68.70% of total population]
- Total votes: 59 426 [37.17% of total population]
- Voting % estimate: 54.11% votes as a % of population 18 and over

Party	Votes	%
African National Congress	44 191	74.36%
Democratic Alliance	9 985	16.80%
Freedom Front Plus	1 611	2.71%
African Christian Democratic Party	1 234	2.08%
Independent Democrats	478	0.80%
United Democratic Movement	338	0.57%
Pan African Congress	318	0.54%
Inkhata Freedom Party	311	0.52%
New National Party	270	0.45%
CDP	139	0.23%
United Christian Democratic Party	131	0.22%
NA	129	0.22%
Azanian People's Organisation	116	0.20%
UF	43	0.07%
SOPA	41	0.07%
TOP	22	0.04%
PJC	20	0.03%
EMSA	18	0.03%
Minority Front	18	0.03%
KISS	9	0.02%
NLP	4	0.01%
Total	59 426	100.00%
