= Alice Glockner Nature Reserve =

Nature reserve in South Africa

- Location within Gauteng
- Location: Gauteng, South Africa
- Nearest city: Heidelberg
- Coordinates: 26.5670°S 28.369°E
- Area: 168 ha (420 acres)
- Established: 1973

Alice Glockner Nature Reserve, in Gauteng, South Africa, is a 168-hectare (420-acre) nature reserve located south of Suikerbosrand Nature Reserve. It has altitudes between 1,600 and 1,700 metres (5,200 and 5,600 ft) above sea level. The closest town is Heidelberg, Gauteng. It contains several threatened or endangered species including Delosperma macellum and the Heidelberg copper butterfly (Chrysoritis aureus).

The floral wealth of the Alice Glockner is confirmed by the complex grass vegetation and the support of no more than 16 proven plants of significant medicinal value.
