= Roodeplaat Nature Reserve =

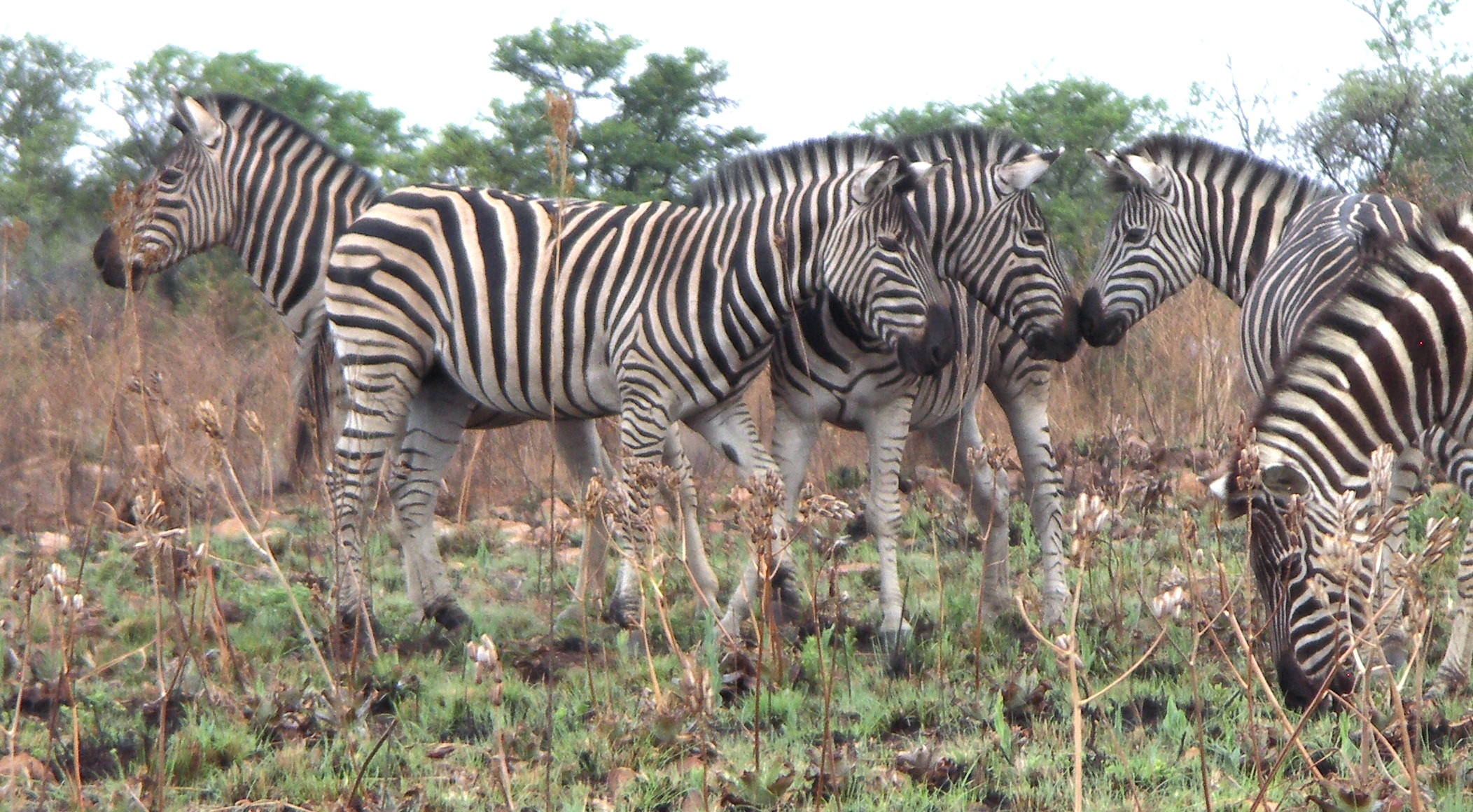
- Common zebra at Roodeplaat Nature Reserve

- Location within Gauteng
- Location: South Africa
- Nearest city: Pretoria
- Coordinates: 25°39′00″S 28°21′44″E
- Area: 1,555 hectares (15.55 km^{2})
- Established: 1977
- Governing body: Gauteng Department of Agriculture and Rural Development

Roodeplaat (Dam Provincial) Nature Reserve is located on the shores of the Roodeplaat Dam, 22 km north-east of Pretoria, Gauteng.

In 1972 the Department of Water Affairs and Forestry (DWAF) delegated the management of the Roodeplaat Dam area to the Nature Conservation division of the Transvaal Provincial Administration (TPA). Their mandate was to develop the area as a nature reserve and outdoor recreation facility for Pretoria's residents. The reserve was proclaimed in 1977.

Roodeplaat dam is a well-known destination for bird watching, game viewing and a range of water sports including freshwater angling.

Over 250 bird species have been recorded here including some interesting species such as Osprey, Eurasian Reed-Warbler, Purple Heron, Black heron and Hammerkop.

== See also ==
- Protected areas of South Africa
