= Nokeng tsa Taemane Local Municipality =

- Local municipality
- Location in Gauteng
- Coordinates: 25°30′S 28°30′E
- Country: South Africa
- Province: Gauteng
- District: Metsweding District
- Seat: Rayton

Area
  - Total: 1,968 km^{2} (760 sq mi)

Population (2007)
  - Total: 49,389
  - Density: 25.10/km^{2} (65.00/sq mi)
  - Households: 14,838

Racial makeup (2007)
  - Black African: 65.12%
  - White: 31.95%
  - Coloured: 1.27%
  - Indian or Asian: 1.67%

Languages (2001)
  - Sepedi: 28.76%
  - Afrikaans: 27.37%
  - Setswana: 7.65%
- Time zone: UTC+2 (SAST)
- Municipal code: GT461
- Website: http://www.nokengmun.co.za/

Nokeng tsa Taemane Local Municipality was a local municipality in the Metsweding District of Gauteng in South Africa.

Due to years of financial mismanagement by the ANC-led council, the municipality was found to be no longer viable. Thus Nokeng tsa Taemane, along with the Metsweding District, was disestablished and absorbed into the Tshwane Metropolitan Municipality on 18 May 2011, the date of the 2011 municipal election.

The name is in Sepedi and Sesotho, meaning "rivers of diamonds". The municipality was given the name because of the vast number of rivers and springs in the area and also the diamonds generated in Cullinan.

== Main places ==
Main places of the municipality, from the 2001 census:

Place	Code
Baviaanspoort	70701
Cullinan	70702
Kekana Gardens	70703
Nokeng tsa Taemane	70704
Onverwacht	70705
Rayton	70706
Refilwe	70707
Roodeplaat Dam Provincial Nature Reserve	70708
Vergenoeg	70709
