= Gauteng =

Province of South Africa

- Province
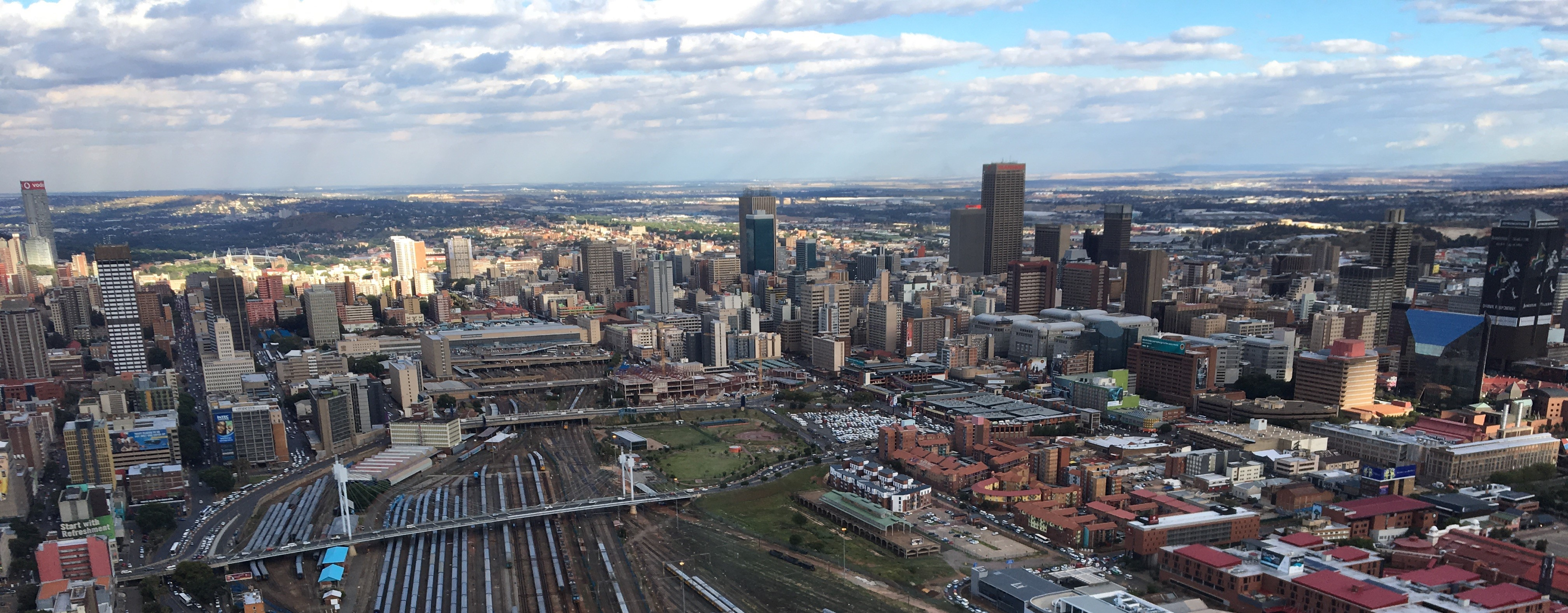
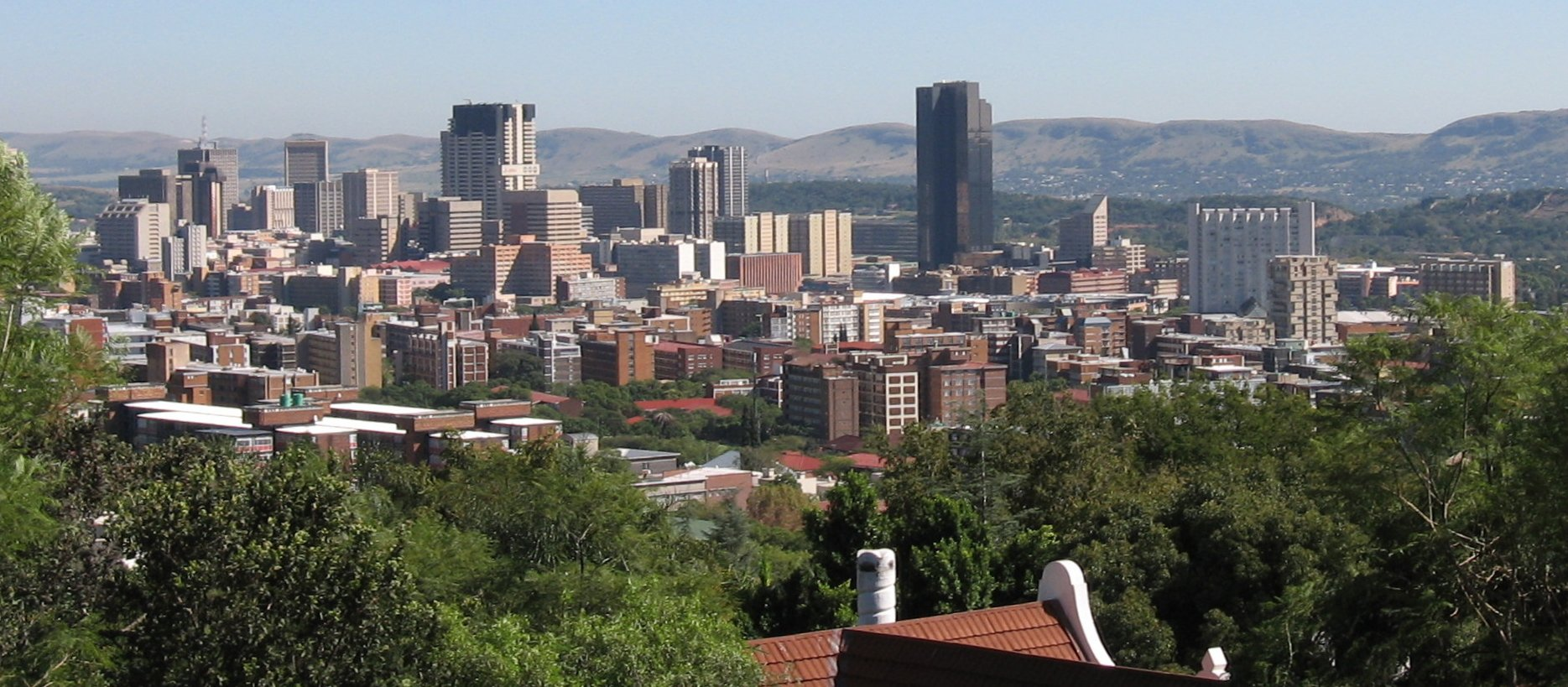
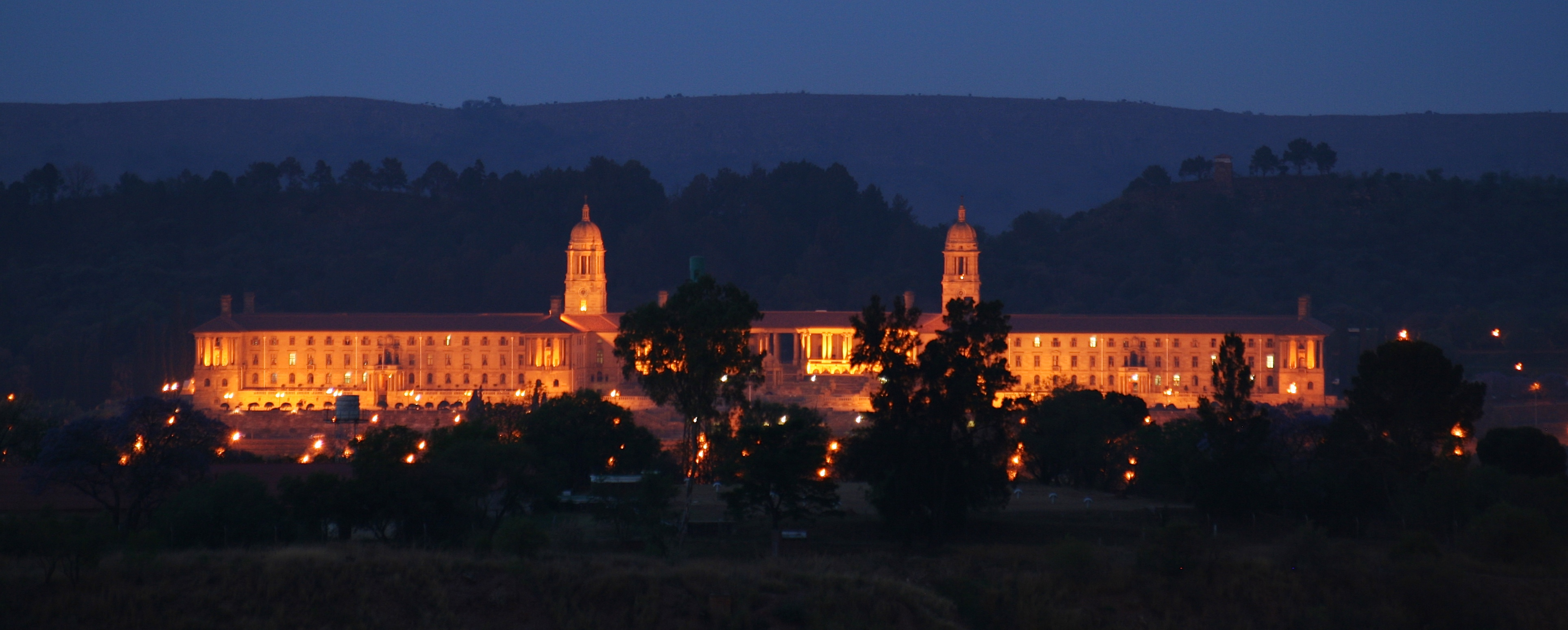
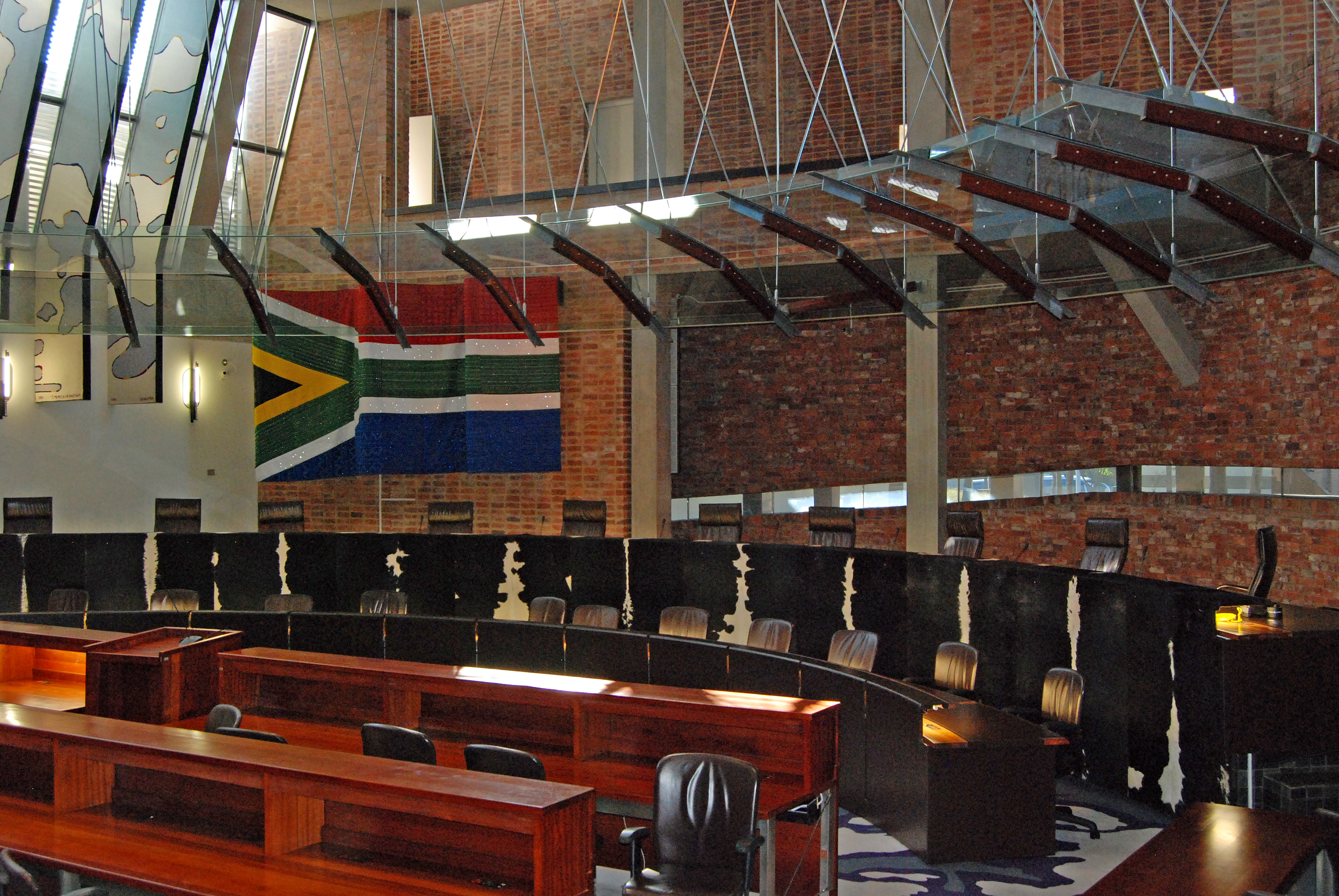
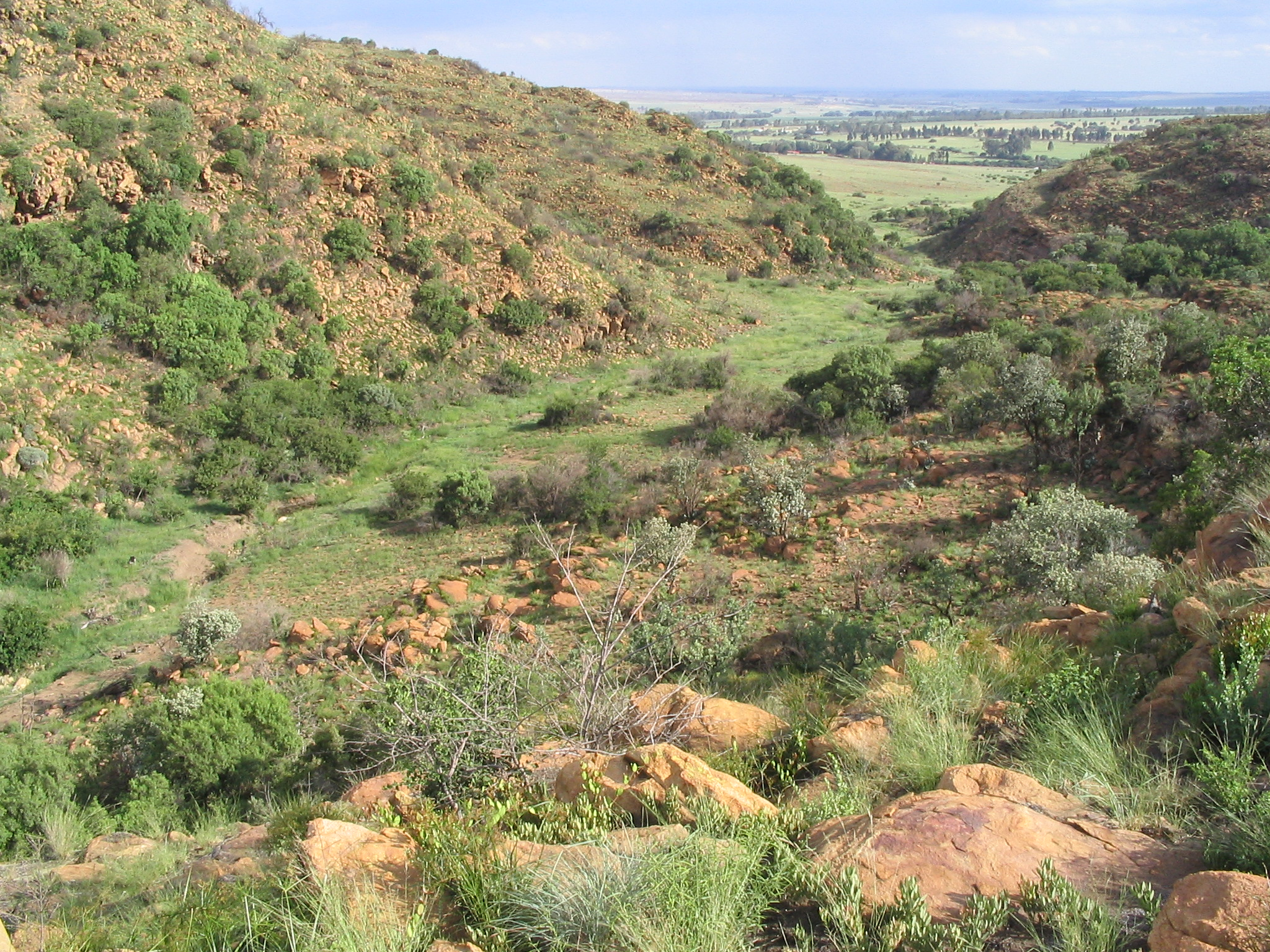
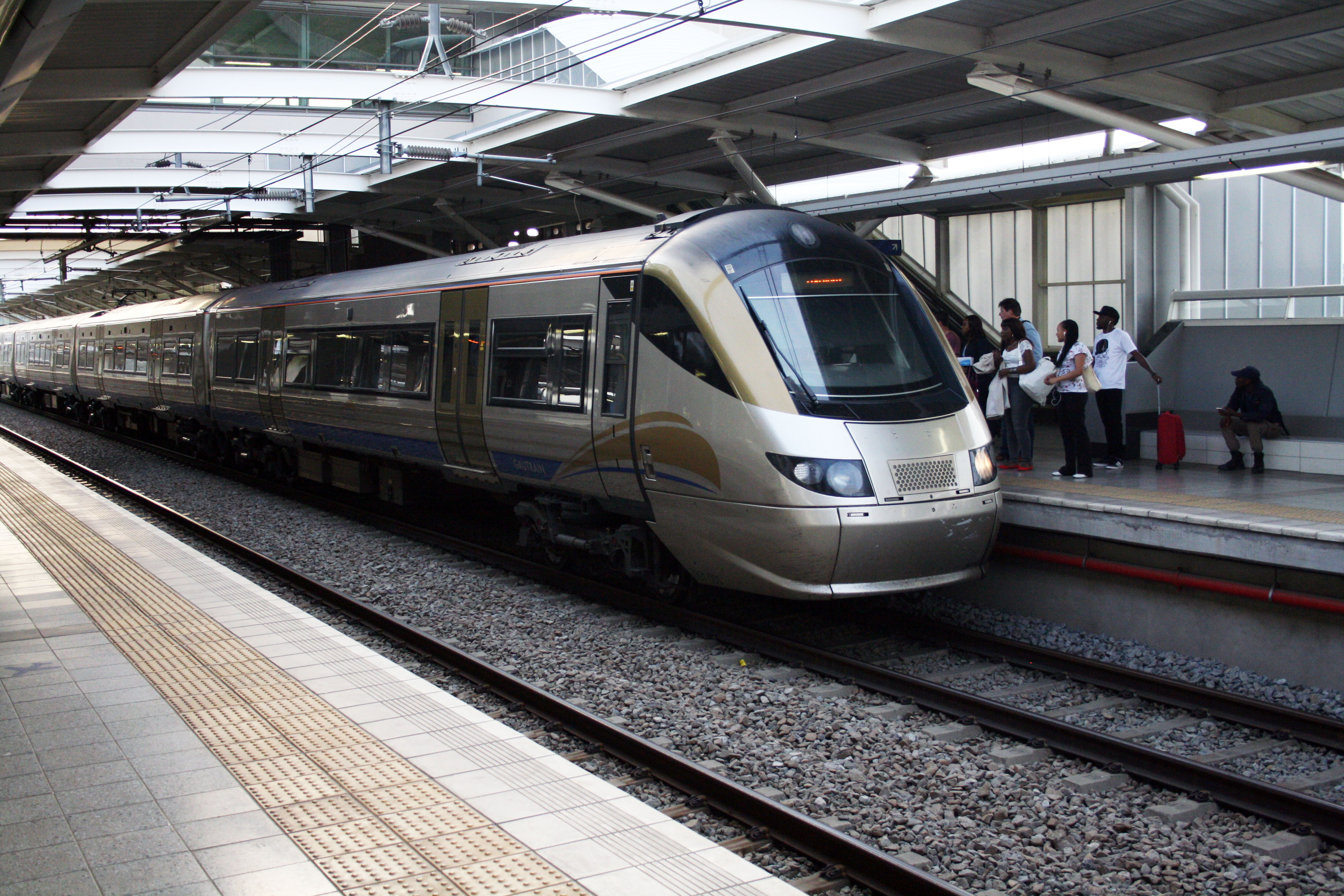
- Johannesburg, South Africa's financial capital Pretoria, South Africa's executive capital Union Buildings, the official seat of South Africa's government Constitutional Court of South Africa located in Johannesburg South African Highveld Gautrain

- Coat of arms
- Nickname: Maboneng (Sotho: Place of Lights)
- Motto: Unity in Diversity
- Location of Gauteng in South Africa
- Interactive map of Gauteng
- Coordinates: 26°27′08″S 28°11′23″E
- Country: South Africa
- Established: 28 April 1994
- Capital: Johannesburg
- Municipalities: List: City of Johannesburg; City of Tshwane; City of Ekurhuleni; Sedibeng; West Rand

Government
  - Type: Parliamentary system
  - Premier: Panyaza Lesufi (ANC)
  - Legislature: Gauteng Provincial Legislature

Area
  - Total: 18,176 km^{2} (7,018 sq mi)
  - Rank: 9th in South Africa
- Highest elevation: 1,913 m (6,276 ft)

Population (2022)
  - Total: 15,099,422
  - Rank: 1st in South Africa
  - Density: 831/km^{2} (2,150/sq mi)
  - Rank: 1st in South Africa

Population groups (2022)
  - Black: 84.6%
  - White: 10.0%
  - Coloured: 2.9%
  - Indian or Asian: 2.2%

Languages (2022)
  - Zulu: 23.1%
  - Southern Sotho: 13.1%
  - Sepedi: 12.6%
  - Tswana: 10.4%
  - English: 9.2%
  - Afrikaans: 9.1%
  - Xhosa: 6.5%
  - Tsonga: 6.1%
  - Other languages: 9.7%
- Time zone: UTC+2 (SAST)
- ISO 3166 code: ZA-GP
- GDP: US$134.7 billion
- HDI (2021): 0.736 high · 2nd of 9
- Website: www.gauteng.gov.za

Gauteng
- Zulu: eGoli
- Xhosa: eRhawutini
- Afrikaans: Gauteng
- Sepedi: Gauteng
- Swazi: eGaotini
- Sesotho: Gauteng
- Setswana: Gauteng
- Xitsonga: eXilungwini
- Venda: Makhuwani
- Southern Ndebele: iRhawuteng
- Khoekhoe: !Huni-ǁhab

Gauteng (/xaʊˈtɛŋ/ khow-TENG, Sotho: [xɑ́.úˈtʼèŋ̀]; Sotho-Tswana for 'place of gold'; Zulu: eGoli or iGoli [îːˈɡóːlì]) is one of the nine provinces of South Africa.

Situated on the Highveld, Gauteng is the smallest province by land area in South Africa. Although Gauteng accounts for only 1.5% of the country's land area, it is the most populous province in South Africa, with more than a quarter (26%) of the national population; the provincial population was approximately 16.1 million, according to mid-year 2022 estimates. Highly urbanised, the province's capital is also the country's largest city, Johannesburg. Gauteng is the wealthiest province in South Africa and is considered the financial hub of South Africa; the financial activity is mostly concentrated in Johannesburg. It also contains South Africa's administrative capital, Pretoria, and other large areas such as Midrand, Vanderbijlpark, Ekurhuleni and the affluent Sandton. The largest township, Soweto, is also found in this province. Politically, it is the most closely contested province between the nationalist African National Congress and the liberal Democratic Alliance in South Africa.

== Etymology ==
The name Gauteng is derived from Sotho-Tswana gauta, meaning 'gold'. There was a thriving gold industry in the province following the 1886 discovery of gold in Johannesburg. In Sesotho, Setswana and Sepedi the name Gauteng was used for Johannesburg and surrounding areas long before it was adopted in 1994 as the official name of the province.

== History ==
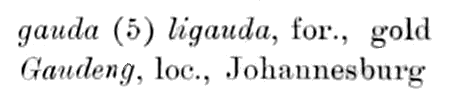
A snippet of text showing the Sesotho word "Gaudeng" (modern Gauteng) in Jacottet's A practical method to learn Sesuto: with exercises and a short vocabulary, published in 1906

Gauteng was formed from part of the old Transvaal province after South Africa's first multiracial elections on 27 April 1994. It was initially called Pretoria–Witwatersrand–Vereeniging (PWV) and was renamed "Gauteng" on the 28th of June 1995, the same day two other provinces were renamed. The term "PWV" describing the region existed long before the establishment of a province by that name, with the "V" sometimes standing for "Vaal Triangle" rather than Vereeniging.

At the Sterkfontein caves, some of the oldest fossils of hominids have been discovered, such as Mrs. Ples and Little Foot.

Events in this area were not written down until the 19th century; information from before that time is lost or difficult to confirm. The first records are from the early 19th century, when settlers originating from the Cape Colony defeated chief Mzilikazi and started establishing villages in the area.

The city of Pretoria, established in 1855 as the capital of the South African Republic, witnessed rapid growth until the discovery of gold in the Witswatersrand area in 1886, which led to the founding of Johannesburg. Despite slower development compared to Johannesburg, Pretoria maintained significance, notably due to its pivotal role in the Second Boer War. The nearby town of Cullinan gained international acclaim in 1905 when the largest diamond ever discovered, the Cullinan Diamond, was mined there.

Many events crucial to the anti-apartheid struggle happened in present-day Gauteng, such as the Freedom Charter of 1955, Women's March of 1956, Sharpeville massacre of 1960, the Rivonia Trial of 1963 and 1964, the little Rivonia Trial of 1964, the Soweto uprising of 1976, Sharpeville Six of 1984 and Boipatong massacre of 1992. The Apartheid Museum documents this era.

== Law and government ==
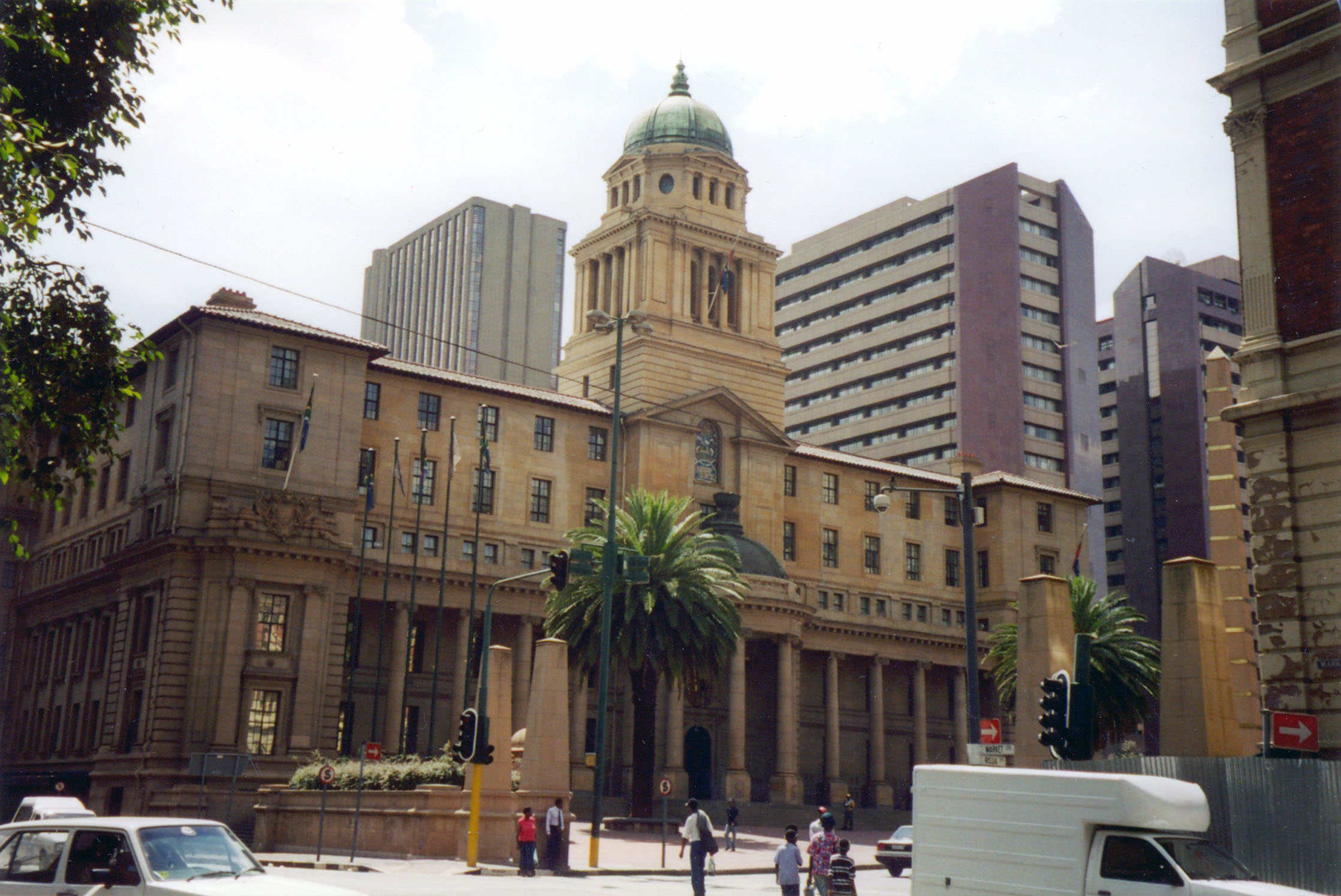
The Johannesburg City Hall, home of the Gauteng Provincial Legislature

Gauteng is governed by the Gauteng Provincial Legislature, a 73-person unicameral legislature elected by party-list proportional representation. The legislature elects one of its members as Premier of Gauteng to lead the executive, and the Premier appoints an Executive Council of up to 10 members of the legislature to serve as heads of the various government departments. The provincial government is responsible for the topics allocated to it in the national constitution, including such fields as basic education, health, housing, social services, agriculture and environmental protection.

The most recent election of the provincial legislature was held on 8 May 2019, and the African National Congress (ANC) won 50.19% of the vote and a 37-seat majority in the legislature. The official opposition is the Democratic Alliance, which won 27.45% of the vote and 20 seats. Other parties represented are the Economic Freedom Fighters with eleven seats and the Freedom Front Plus with three seats. The Inkatha Freedom Party and African Christian Democratic Party hold one seat each. Premier David Makhura of the ANC was re-elected as premier on 22 May 2019, at the first meeting of the legislature after the general election. Makhura resigned from the position on 6 October 2022 and Panyaza Lesufi of the ANC was elected to replace him. In the 2024 South African general election, held on 29 May, the ANC received 34% of the vote, while the DA received 28%.

The Gauteng Division of the High Court of South Africa, which has seats in Pretoria and Johannesburg, is a superior court with general jurisdiction over the province. Johannesburg is also home to the Constitutional Court, South Africa's highest court, and to a branch of the Labour Court and Labour Appeal Court.

== Geography ==
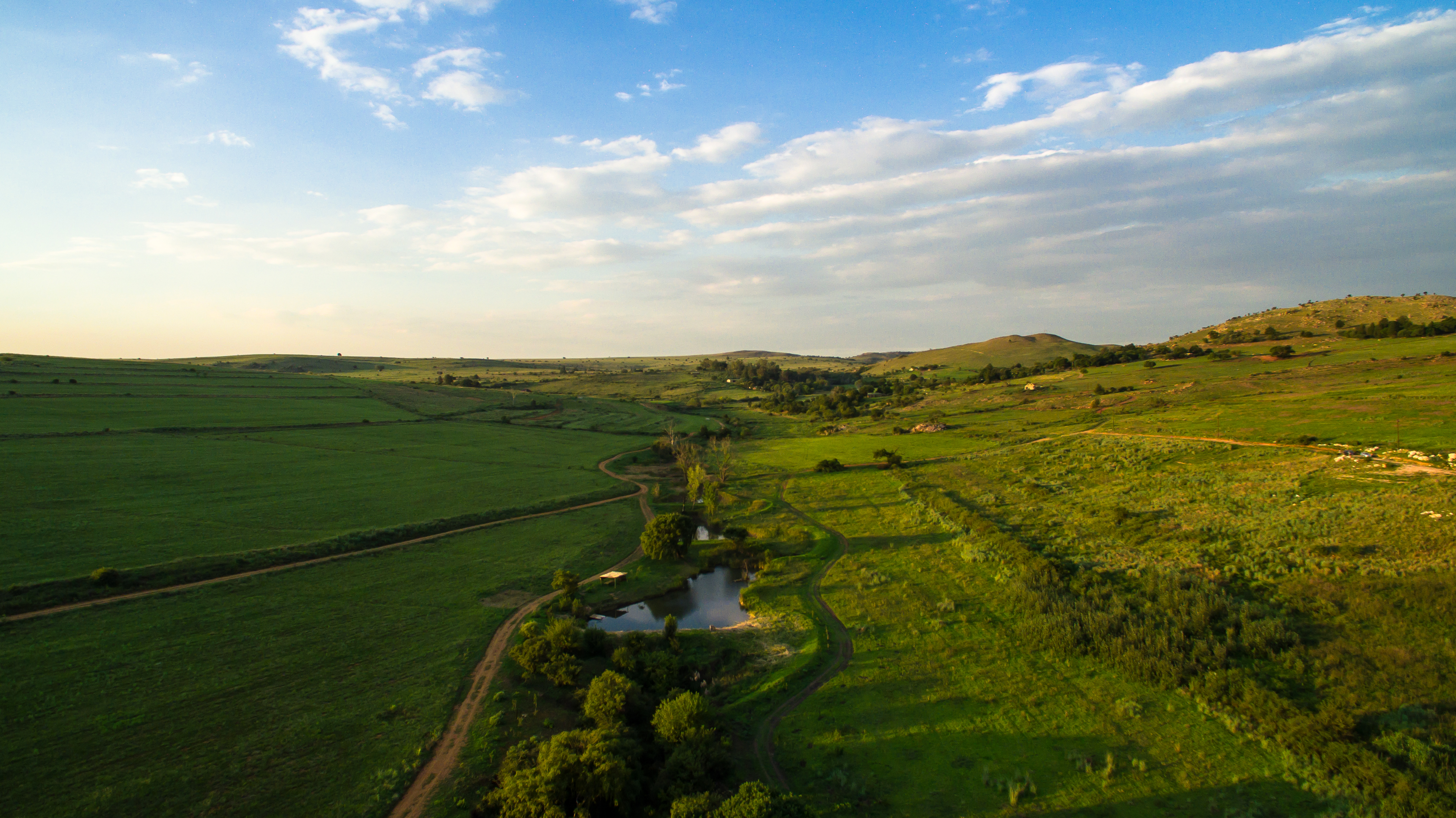
The undulating hills that form part of the rural areas in the province just north of Johannesburg. Although Gauteng is a heavily urbanised province, much of its area is extensively cultivated for agriculture.

Gauteng's southern border is the Vaal River, which separates it from the Free State. It also borders on North West to the west, Limpopo to the north, and Mpumalanga to the east. Gauteng is the only landlocked province of South Africa without a foreign border. Most of Gauteng is on the Highveld, a high-altitude grassland (circa 1,500 m or 4,921 ft above sea level). Between Johannesburg and Pretoria, there are low parallel ridges and undulating hills, some part of the Magaliesberg Mountains and the Witwatersrand. The north of the province is more subtropical, due to its lower altitude and is mostly dry savanna habitat.

=== Witwatersrand area ===
In the southern half of Gauteng, the Witwatersrand area is an older term describing a 120 km wide oblong-shaped conurbation from Randfontein in the West to Nigel in the East, named after the Witwatersrand, a geologically and economically important series of low ridges and their associated plateau that greater Johannesburg developed on. This area is also often referred to simply as "Witwatersrand", "the Rand" or "the Reef" (archaic, after the gold reefs that precipitated the development of the area), and was the "W" in PWV, the initial name for Gauteng. It has traditionally been divided into the three areas of East Rand (governed by the Ekurhuleni Metropolitan Municipality), Central Rand (approximately today's Johannesburg Municipality) and West Rand.

=== Climate ===
The climate is mostly influenced by altitude. Even though the province is at a subtropical latitude, the climate is comparatively cooler, especially in Johannesburg, at 1,700 m (5,577 ft) above sea level (Pretoria is at 1,330 m or 4,364 ft). Most precipitation occurs as brief afternoon thunderstorms; however, relative humidity never becomes uncomfortable. Winters are crisp and dry with frost occurring often in the southern areas. Snow is rare, but it has occurred on some occasions in the Johannesburg metropolitan area.

Climate data for Pretoria, elevation 1,308 m (4,291 ft), (1991–2020 normals, extremes 1951–1990)
Month	Jan	Feb	Mar	Apr	May	Jun	Jul	Aug	Sep	Oct	Nov	Dec	Year
Record high °C (°F)	36.2 (97.2)	36.3 (97.3)	35.0 (95.0)	32.5 (90.5)	30.3 (86.5)	26.0 (78.8)	26.0 (78.8)	30.0 (86.0)	34.0 (93.2)	36.0 (96.8)	35.7 (96.3)	36.0 (96.8)	36.3 (97.3)
Mean daily maximum °C (°F)	29.0 (84.2)	29.1 (84.4)	27.7 (81.9)	25.0 (77.0)	22.7 (72.9)	20.7 (69.3)	20.5 (68.9)	23.6 (74.5)	27.2 (81.0)	28.6 (83.5)	28.7 (83.7)	28.8 (83.8)	26.0 (78.8)
Daily mean °C (°F)	23.2 (73.8)	23.2 (73.8)	21.8 (71.2)	18.7 (65.7)	15.2 (59.4)	12.2 (54.0)	11.9 (53.4)	15.4 (59.7)	19.7 (67.5)	21.4 (70.5)	22.1 (71.8)	22.7 (72.9)	19.0 (66.1)
Mean daily minimum °C (°F)	18.0 (64.4)	17.9 (64.2)	16.5 (61.7)	13.0 (55.4)	8.0 (46.4)	5.0 (41.0)	4.6 (40.3)	8.0 (46.4)	12.0 (53.6)	15.0 (59.0)	16.5 (61.7)	17.3 (63.1)	12.3 (54.1)
Record low °C (°F)	7.5 (45.5)	10.4 (50.7)	5.5 (41.9)	3.3 (37.9)	−1.5 (29.3)	−4.5 (23.9)	−4.5 (23.9)	−4.0 (24.8)	−0.5 (31.1)	3.0 (37.4)	6.6 (43.9)	6.5 (43.7)	−4.5 (23.9)
Average precipitation mm (inches)	118.5 (4.67)	109.5 (4.31)	81.4 (3.20)	32.5 (1.28)	15.4 (0.61)	5.8 (0.23)	0.6 (0.02)	4.2 (0.17)	17.1 (0.67)	63.9 (2.52)	98.0 (3.86)	115.2 (4.54)	662.1 (26.08)
Average precipitation days (≥ 1.0 mm)	10.2	8.3	6.8	4.0	1.7	1.1	0.2	0.7	1.8	6.2	9.2	10.6	60.8
Average relative humidity (%)	62	63	63	63	56	54	50	45	44	52	59	61	56
Mean monthly sunshine hours	260.8	235.3	253.9	245.8	282.6	270.8	289.1	295.5	284.3	275.2	253.6	271.9	3,218.8
Source 1: NOAA (sun and humidity 1961−1990) Deutscher Wetterdienst (extremes)Starlings Roost Weather
Source 2: South African Weather Service

Climate data for Johannesburg (O. R. Tambo International Airport), elevation 1,695 m (5,561 ft), (1991–2020 normals, extremes 1951–present)
Month	Jan	Feb	Mar	Apr	May	Jun	Jul	Aug	Sep	Oct	Nov	Dec	Year
Record high °C (°F)	38.0 (100.4)	33.5 (92.3)	31.9 (89.4)	29.3 (84.7)	26.4 (79.5)	23.1 (73.6)	24.4 (75.9)	30.0 (86.0)	34.5 (94.1)	32.2 (90.0)	36.5 (97.7)	35.5 (95.9)	38.0 (100.4)
Mean daily maximum °C (°F)	25.5 (77.9)	25.6 (78.1)	24.4 (75.9)	21.7 (71.1)	19.6 (67.3)	17.3 (63.1)	15.8 (60.4)	20.1 (68.2)	23.6 (74.5)	25.0 (77.0)	25.1 (77.2)	25.5 (77.9)	22.4 (72.4)
Daily mean °C (°F)	20.0 (68.0)	19.8 (67.6)	18.6 (65.5)	16.1 (61.0)	13.5 (56.3)	10.7 (51.3)	9.7 (49.5)	13.1 (55.6)	16.7 (62.1)	17.1 (62.8)	17.9 (64.2)	19.0 (66.2)	15.5 (59.9)
Mean daily minimum °C (°F)	14.9 (58.8)	14.7 (58.5)	13.4 (56.1)	10.7 (51.3)	7.6 (45.7)	4.7 (40.5)	3.5 (38.3)	6.5 (43.7)	9.8 (49.6)	11.8 (53.2)	13.1 (55.6)	14.5 (58.1)	10.4 (50.8)
Record low °C (°F)	7.2 (45.0)	6.0 (42.8)	2.1 (35.8)	0.5 (32.9)	−2.5 (27.5)	−8.2 (17.2)	−7.0 (19.4)	−5.0 (23.0)	−3.3 (26.1)	0.2 (32.4)	1.5 (34.7)	3.5 (38.3)	−8.2 (17.2)
Average precipitation mm (inches)	131.7 (5.19)	102.0 (4.02)	94.8 (3.73)	42.1 (1.66)	20.0 (0.79)	6.6 (0.26)	1.7 (0.07)	5.4 (0.21)	16.2 (0.64)	68.4 (2.69)	101.1 (3.98)	130.0 (5.12)	720.0 (28.35)
Average precipitation days (≥ 1.0 mm)	10.2	8.4	8.1	4.7	1.8	1.1	0.3	0.8	1.8	7.0	10.4	12.6	67.2
Average relative humidity (%)	69	70	68	65	56	53	49	46	47	56	65	66	59
Average dew point °C (°F)	14.1 (57.4)	14.2 (57.6)	12.6 (54.7)	9.5 (49.1)	4.9 (40.8)	1.5 (34.7)	−0.5 (31.1)	1.7 (35.1)	5.3 (41.5)	8.2 (46.8)	11.2 (52.2)	12.5 (54.5)	7.9 (46.3)
Mean monthly sunshine hours	250.1	224.8	238.8	236.9	276.0	266.9	283.9	284.1	280.8	269.5	248.7	263.9	3,124.4
Mean daily daylight hours	13.6	13.0	12.2	11.5	10.8	10.5	10.7	11.2	12.0	12.7	13.4	13.8	12.1
Average ultraviolet index	14	14	12	9	6	5	5	7	9	12	14	14	10
Source 1: NOAA (humidity and sun 1961–1990)Starlings Roost Weather
Source 2: South African Weather Service Weather Atlas

=== Cities and towns ===
- Alberton
- Atteridgeville
- Benoni
- Boksburg
- Bronkhorstspruit
- Brakpan
- Carletonville
- Centurion
- Cullinan
- Edenvale
- Ga-Rankuwa
- Germiston
- Hammanskraal
- Heidelberg
- Henley on Klip
- Johannesburg
- Kempton Park
- Krugersdorp
- Mabopane
- Mamelodi
- Magaliesburg
- Meyerton
- Midrand
- Nigel
- Parkhurst
- Pretoria
- Randburg
- Randfontein
- Roodepoort
- Rosebank
- Sandton
- Soshanguve
- Soweto
- Springs
- Tembisa
- Vanderbijlpark
- Vereeniging

=== Administrative divisions ===
Gauteng municipalities

The Gauteng Province (as of May 2011) is divided into three metropolitan municipalities and two district municipalities. The district municipalities are in turn divided into six local municipalities:

==== District municipalities ====
- Sedibeng District
  - Emfuleni
  - Lesedi
  - Midvaal
- West Rand District
  - Merafong City
  - Mogale City
  - Rand West City

==== Metropolitan municipalities ====
- Tshwane Metropolitan Municipality (Pretoria)
- Johannesburg Metropolitan Municipality
- Ekurhuleni Metropolitan Municipality

The former Metsweding district consisting of Nokeng Tsa Taemane and Kungwini in the North of the province was incorporated into Tshwane in 2011.

== Demographics ==
Population density in Gauteng: <1 /km²; 1–3 /km²; 3–10 /km²; 10–30 /km²; 30–100 /km²; 100–300 /km²; 300–1000 /km²; 1000–3000 /km²; >3000 /km²

Dominant home languages in Gauteng: Afrikaans; English; Ndebele; Xhosa; Zulu; Pedi; Sotho; Tswana; Swati; Venda; Tsonga; No language dominant

As of the 2022 census, Gauteng had a population of 15,099,422, an increase of 23.0% from the last census in 2011. Despite being the smallest province by area, it has the highest population of any South African province, with 24.3% of the total South African population.

As of 2022, there are 5,318,665 households in Gauteng. The population density is 831/km^{2}. The density of households is 155.86/km^{2}.

About 22.1% of all households are made up of individuals. The average household size fell slightly between the 2011 census and 2022 census, from 3.1 to 2.8 persons.

The province's age distribution was 23.6% under the age of 15, 19.6% from 15 to 24, 37.9% from 25 to 44, 15.0% from 45 to 64, and 4.0% who are 65 years of age or older. The median age is 27 years. For every 100 females there are 101.2 males. For every 100 females age 18 and over, there are 102.3 males.

=== Languages ===
According to the 2022 census, in Gauteng, the most spoken languages at home were:

- Zulu: 23.1% of residents
- Sesotho: 13.1%
- Sepedi: 12.6%
- Setswana: 10.4%
- English: 9.2%
- Afrikaans: 7.7%
- Xitsonga: 7.0%
- IsiXhosa: 6.7%
- IsiNdebele: 3.1%
- Tshivenda: 2.4%
- SiSwati: 0.9%
- South African Sign Language: 0.02%
- Other languages: 21.7%

=== Religion ===
Of residents, 86.1% are Christian, 4.3% have no religion, 1.6% are Muslim, 0.1% are Jewish, and 0.7% are Hindu; 6.0% stated Traditional African religions as their faith.

=== Educational attainment ===
Of residents, 8.4% aged 20 and over have received no schooling, 11.2% have had some primary, 5.5% have completed only primary school, 34.3% have had some high education, 28.0% have finished only high school, and 12.6% have an education higher than the high school level. Overall, 40.6% of residents have completed high school.

=== Economic status ===
Of housing units, 56.1% have a telephone and/or mobile phone in the dwelling, 41.5% have access to a phone nearby, and 2.3% have access that is not nearby or no access; 82.8% of households have a flush or chemical toilet, while 84.2% have refuse removed by the municipality at least once a week and 2.6% have no rubbish disposal. For running water, 47.2% have it inside their dwelling, 83.6% have running water on their property, and 97.5% have access to running water. Of households, 73.2% use electricity for cooking, 70.4% for heating, and 80.8% for lighting; 77.4% of households have a radio, 65.7% have a television, 15.1% own a computer, 62.1% have a refrigerator, and 45.1% have a mobile phone.

Of the population aged 15–65, 25.8% is unemployed.

The median annual income of working adults aged 15–65 is R 23 539 ($3,483). Males have a median annual income of R 24 977 ($3,696) versus R 20 838 ($3,083) for females.

Distribution of annual income of Gauteng province (2001)
Category	
No income	2.0%
R 12 – R 4 800 ($2 – $721)	6.4%
R 4 812 – R 9 600 ($723 – $1,443)	13.0%
R 9 612 – R 19 200 ($1,445 – $2,886)	24.0%
R 19 212 – R 38 400 ($2,888 – $5,772)	20.4%
R 38 412 – R 76 800 ($5,774 – $11,543)	15.8%
R 76 812 – R 153 600 ($11,545 – $23,087)	10.4%
R 153 612 – R 307 200 ($23,089 – $46,174)	5.0%
R 307 212 – R 614 400 ($46,176 – $92,348)	1.8%
R 614 412 or more ($92,350+)	1.1%

Ethnic group 2021 population
Ethnic group	Population	%
Black African	12 648 380	80%
White	2 212 454	14%
Coloured	474 311,64	3%
Asian	474 311,64	3%
Total	15 810 388	100.00%

=== Life expectancy ===
Gauteng is the province with the second highest life expectancy in the country in 2019 with females having a life expectancy of 69 years and males having a life expectancy of 64 years.

=== Urban conurbation ===
Historically described as the PWV complex, the urban conurbation of Gauteng, referred to as the Gauteng City Region, contains the major urban populations of Johannesburg (7,860,781 as of 2011), Pretoria (1,763,336), Vereeniging (377,922), Evaton (605,504) and Soshanguve (728,063), coming to an urban population of over 11 million. Thomas Brinkhoff lists a "Consolidated Urban Area" in Gauteng as having a population of 13.1 million as of January 2017. The future governmental plans for the region indicate the gradual urbanisation and consolidation towards the creation of a megalopolis that connects these metros. The GCRO is a collaboration between the Universities of Johannesburg and Witwatersrand, the city of Johannesburg, Gauteng Provincial Government, and SALGA-Gauteng. The GCRO's purpose is to collect information and create a database on the Gauteng City Region to provide to government, lawmakers and civil society an informed understanding of the fastest urbanizing region in Southern Africa.

== Economy ==
Gauteng is considered the economic hub of South Africa and contributes heavily in the financial, manufacturing, transport, technology, and telecommunications sectors, among others. It also plays host to a large number of overseas companies requiring a commercial base in and gateway to Africa.

Gauteng is home to the Johannesburg Stock Exchange, the largest stock exchange in Africa. Some of the largest companies in Africa and abroad are based in Gauteng, or have offices and branches there, such as Vodacom, MTN, Neotel, Microsoft South Africa and the largest Porsche Centre in the world.

Although Gauteng is the smallest of South Africa's nine provinces—it covers a mere 1.5% of the country's total land area, the province is responsible for a third of South Africa's gross domestic product (GDP). Gauteng generates about 10% of the total GDP of sub-Saharan Africa and about 7% of total African GDP. Gauteng has the highest GDP and GDP per capita of all South Africa's provinces. Gauteng is also the province with the most taxpayers and the highest average taxable income per taxpayer according to the South African Revenue Service.

== Transport ==
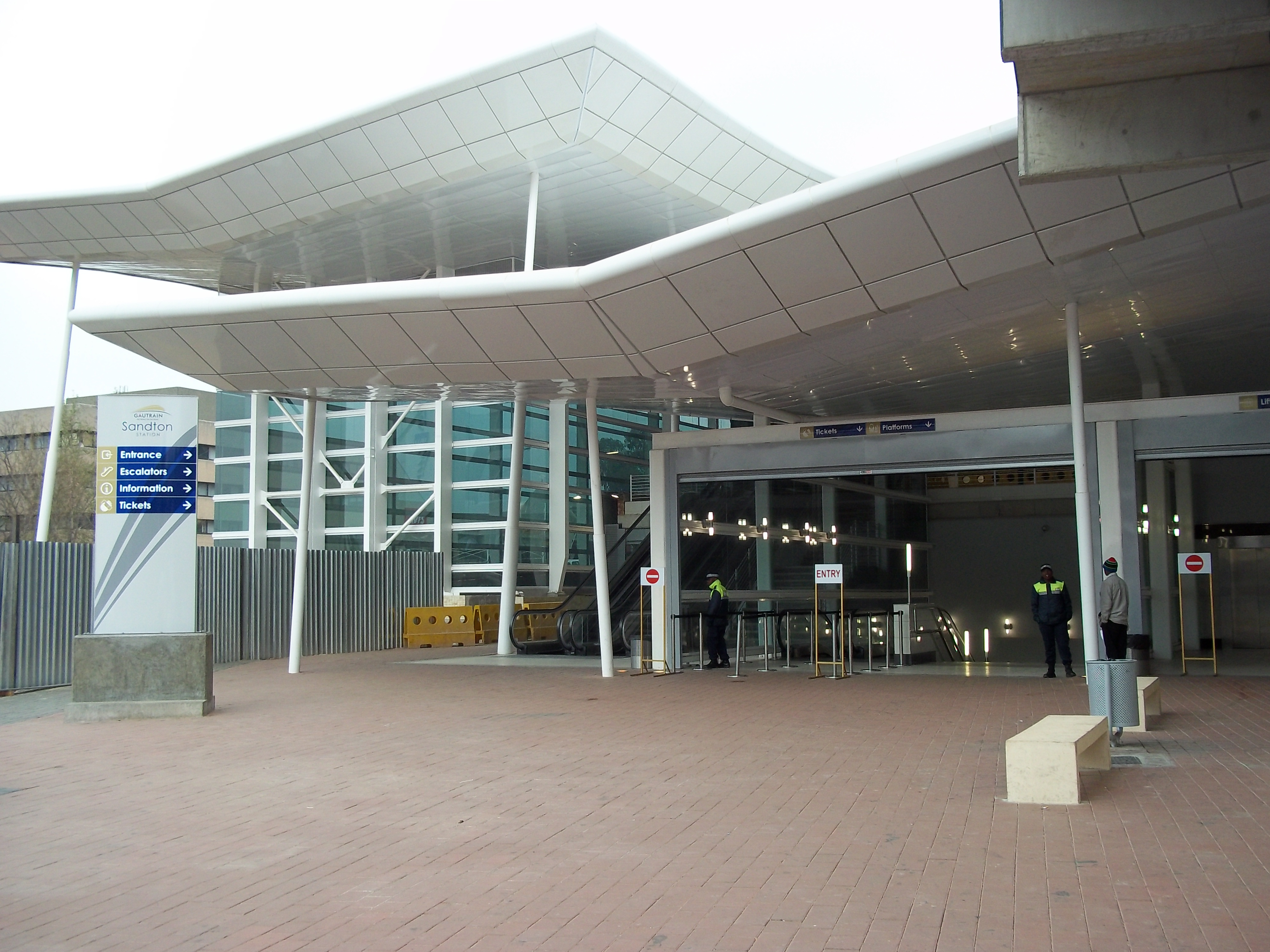
Sandton Gautrain Station in August 2010

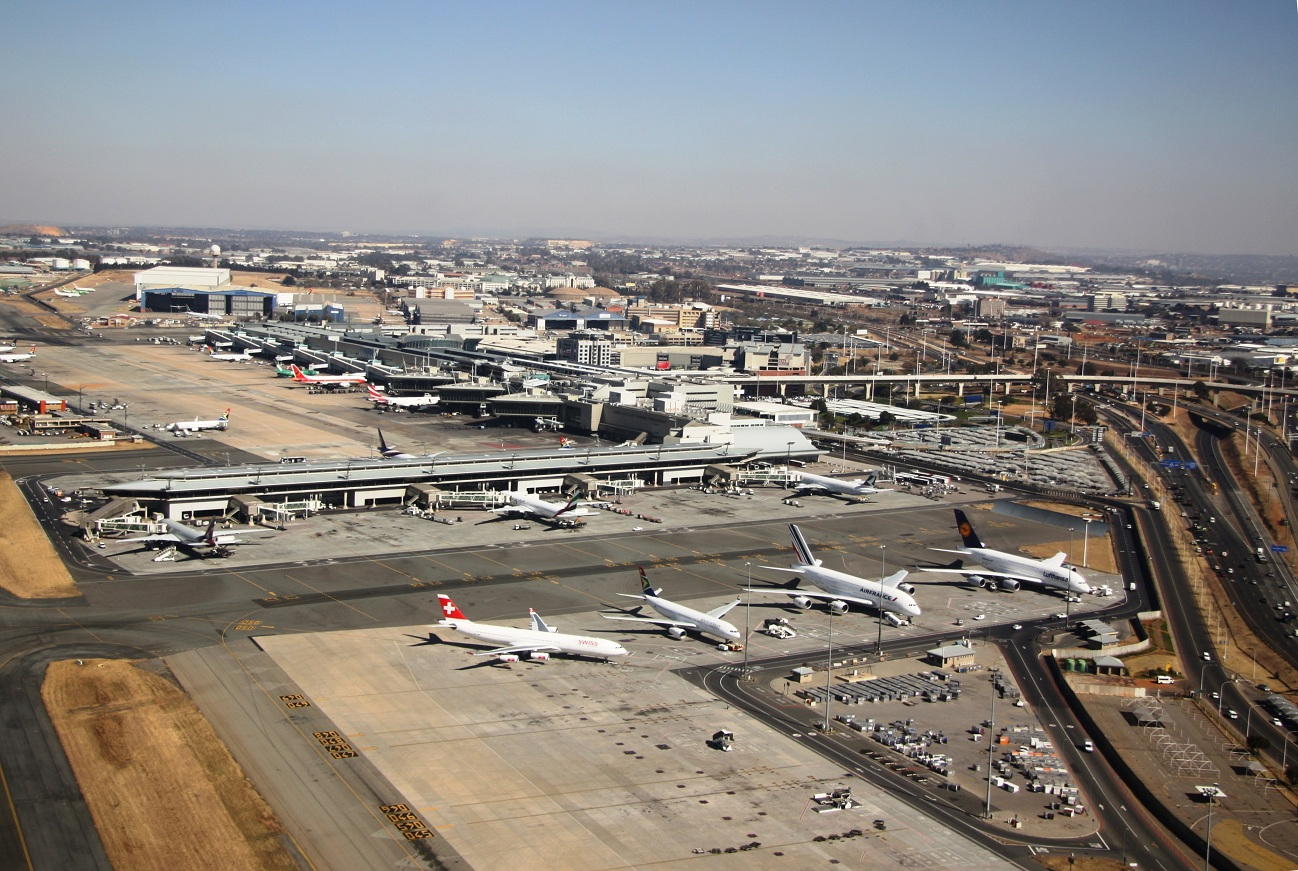
O.R. Tambo International Airport, the biggest airport in Africa

SANRAL, a parastatal, is responsible for the maintenance, development and management of all national road networks in South Africa. SANRAL is responsible for instituting the Gauteng Freeway Improvement Project, which was met with a lot of opposition due to the tolling of Gauteng motorists. Many important national routes run through Gauteng such as the N1, N3, N4, N12, N14 and the N17. Johannesburg is quite dependent on freeways for transport in and around the city. The R21, R24, R59, M1 and M2 all run through Johannesburg while the R80 connects Pretoria Central to Soshanguve. The Gauteng Freeway Improvement Project led to a large decrease in traffic congestion when construction finished 2011–2012. Cape Town, for the first time in decades, is now the most congested city in South Africa.

PUTCO, the largest commuter bus operator in South Africa, services the Gauteng area extensively. The bus rapid transit system Rea Vaya also serves to transport people from Johannesburg's southern neighbourhoods into and around the CBD. In an interview, Parks Tau stated that by 2040, Johannesburg will be dominated by pedestrians and public transport as opposed to the use of private transport or informal transport, such as minibus taxis.

Gautrain and Metrorail both service the province's public transport sector where trains are concerned and Gautrain offers a bus service that transports commuters to and from various train stations and predetermined bus stops. Metrorail trains are considered one of the most cost-effective methods of transportation in and around Gauteng.

The O. R. Tambo International Airport, Rand Airport, Lanseria International Airport, Wonderboom Airport and Grand Central Airport are located in Gauteng.

There is a large informal transport sector in Gauteng, consisting of thousands of minibus taxis, which many of the urban and rural population makes use of. However, it is noted that taxis are often unsafe as their drivers ignore the rules of the road and the vehicles are often not roadworthy. The City of Johannesburg stated that: "major initiatives are under way to completely reform the taxi industry and provide more comfort and safety to customers." In March 2017, it is reported that Gauteng alone has 4,7 million registered vehicles under the "GP" abbreviation via the eNatis system.

== Education ==
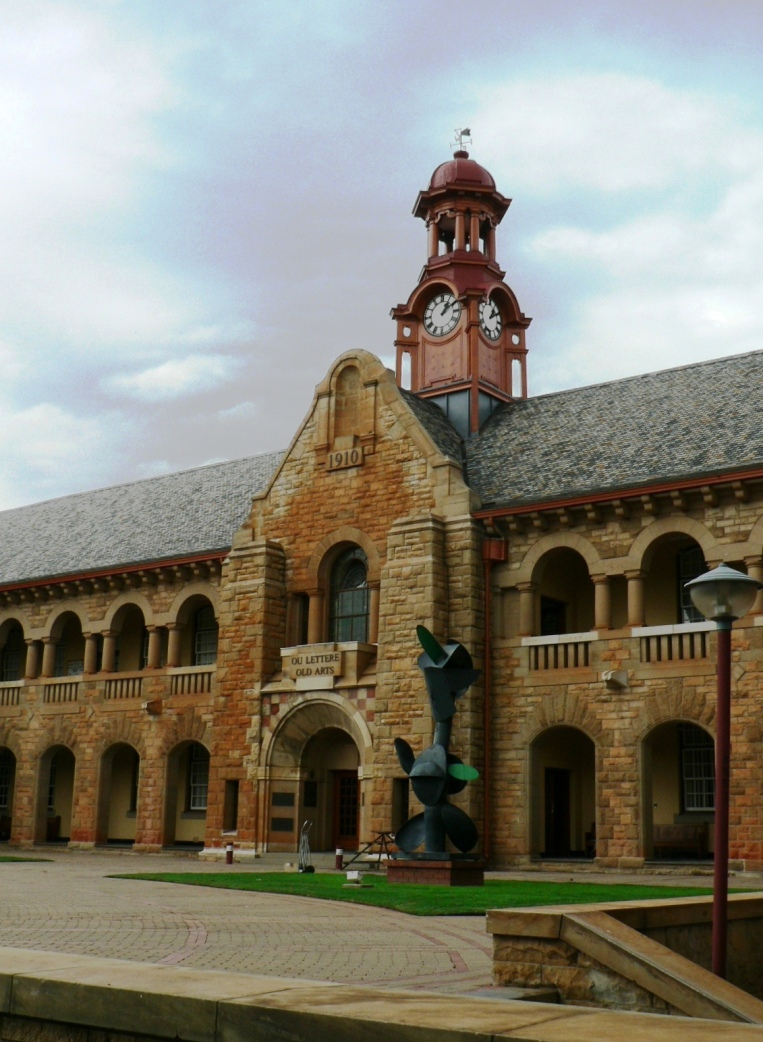
University of Pretoria's Old Arts Building

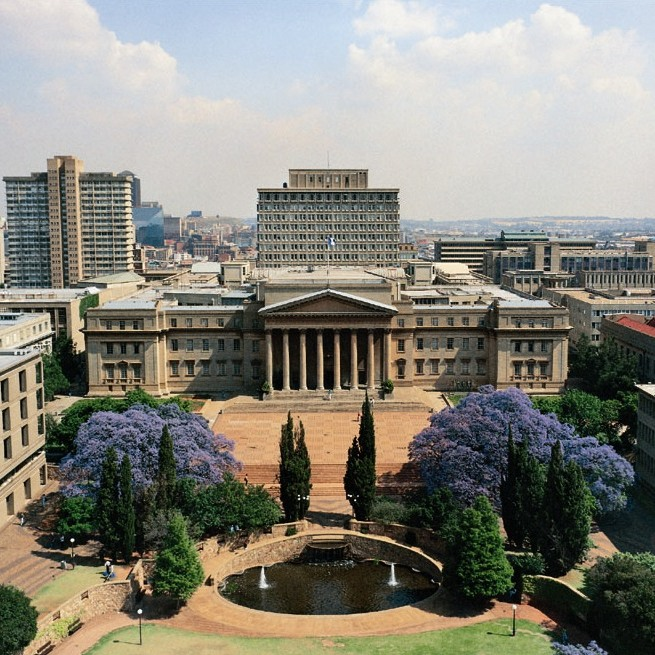
University of the Witwatersrand located in Johannesburg

Gauteng is a large centre of learning in South Africa, and it has many universities and educational institutions of higher learning.

=== Universities ===
- Monash University South Africa Campus
- Tshwane University of Technology
- University of Johannesburg
- Sefako Makgatho Health Sciences University
- University of Pretoria
- University of South Africa
- University of the Witwatersrand
- Vaal University of Technology

=== Colleges ===
- African Leadership Academy
- CTI Education Group
- Damelin
- Lyceum College
- Midrand Graduate Institute
- Rabbinical College of Pretoria
- St Augustine College of South Africa
- Milpark Education
- Stadio

In 2002, the Gauteng Department of Education founded an initiative called Gauteng Online in an attempt to get the entire province to utilize a wide assortment of electronic and telecommunications systems. In 2007, this initiative was handed over to the Gauteng Department of Finance.

In the 2013 national budget speech, it was announced that the Gauteng Department of Education would be granted over R700 million to improve education and to alleviate issues concerning the overcrowding in schools, a shortage in teaching staff and transport for poor pupils.

In 2017/2018, the Gauteng Provincial government spent R42.4 billion on education which accounted for 38% the province's total expenditure.

== Conservation ==
Although Gauteng province is dominated by the urban areas of Johannesburg and Pretoria, it has several nature reserves. Gauteng is home to the Cradle of Humankind UNESCO World Heritage Site which includes the Sterkfontein caves and the Wonder Cave Kromdraai. Johannesburg is home to the largest human-made urban forest in the world.

=== Botanical gardens ===
- Walter Sisulu National Botanical Garden
- Johannesburg Botanical Garden
- Pretoria National Botanical Garden

=== Nature reserves ===
- Rietvlei Nature Reserve
- Suikerbosrand Nature Reserve
- Groenkloof Nature Reserve
- Dinokeng Game Reserve

=== Private and municipal reserves ===
- Kromdraai Conservancy
- Krugersdorp Nature Reserve
- Rietvlei Nature Reserve
- Wonderboom Nature Reserve

=== Provincial reserves ===
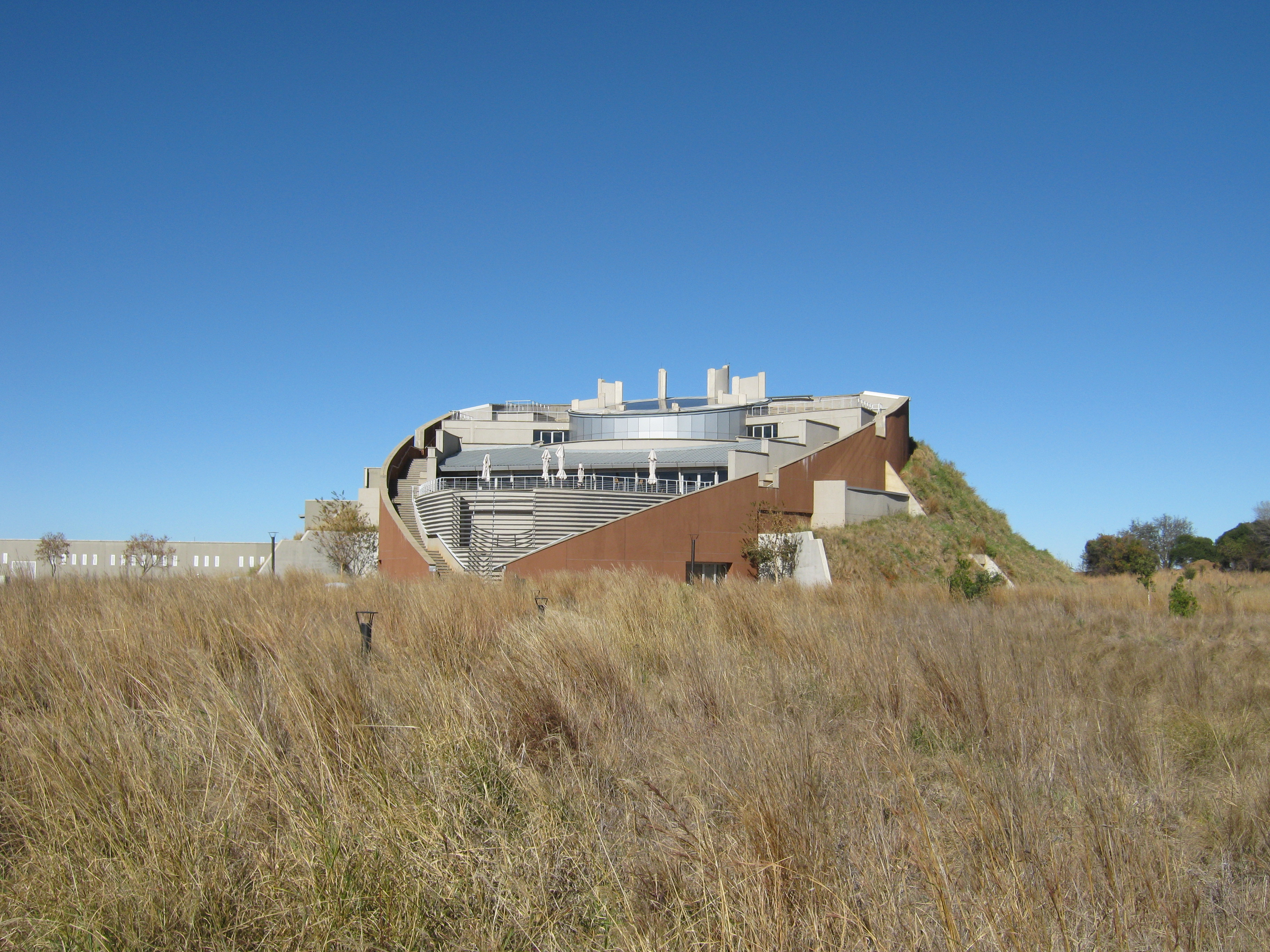
The Maropeng visitors centre at the Cradle of Humankind

There are 5 provincial reserves managed by the Gauteng Department of Agriculture, Conservation, Environment and Land Affairs:

- Abe Bailey Nature Reserve
- Alice Glockner Nature Reserve
- Marievale Bird Sanctuary
- Roodeplaat Nature Reserve
- Suikerbosrand Nature Reserve

== Sport ==
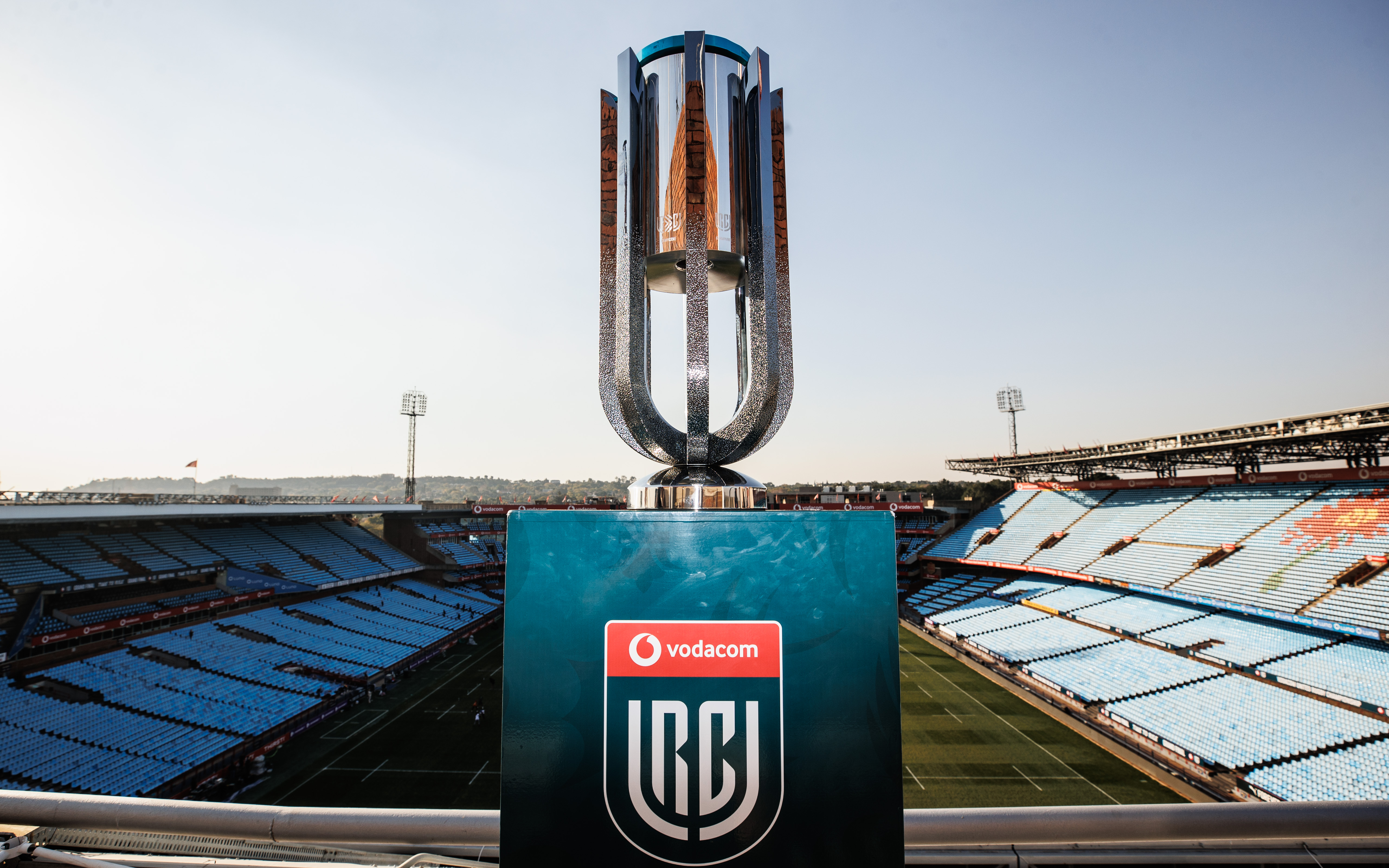
Loftus Versfeld Stadium, one of Gauteng's various stadia and venue for the 2010 FIFA World Cup

FNB Stadium South Africa and Africa's largest stadium

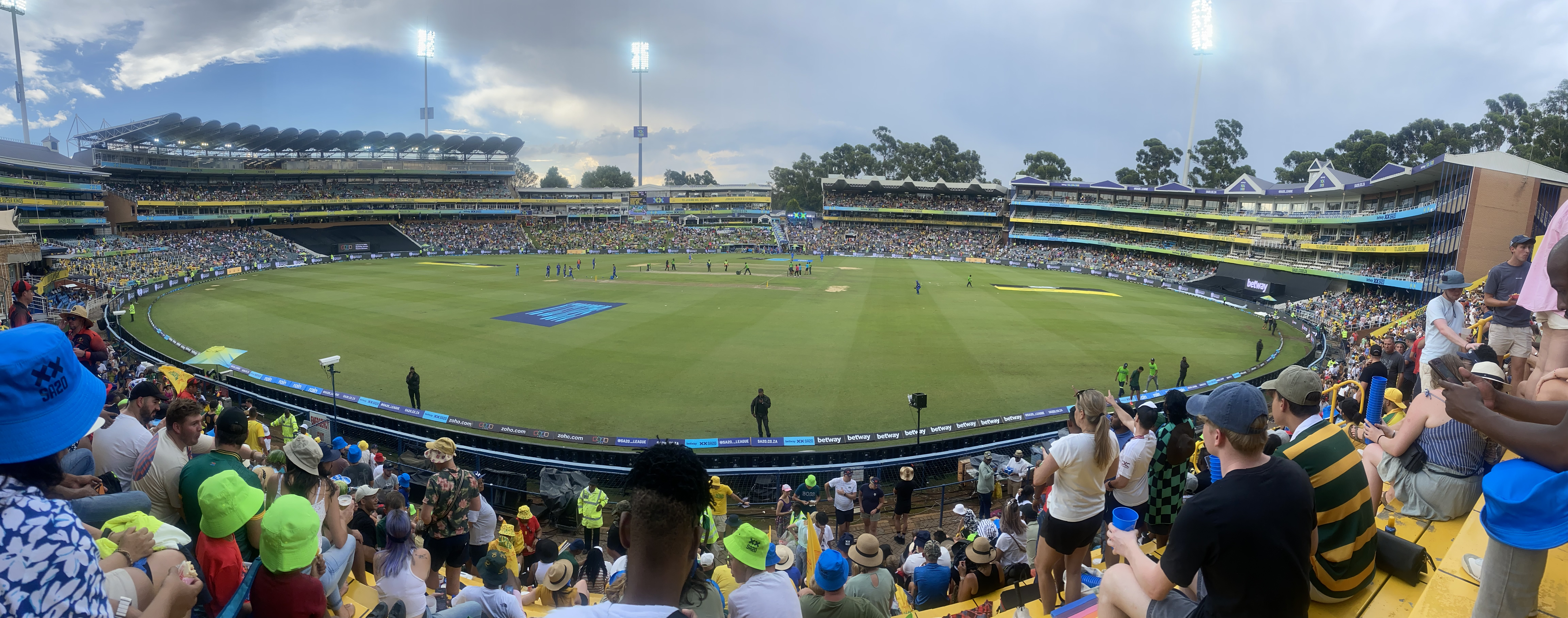
Wanderers Stadium South Africas largest Cricket stadium

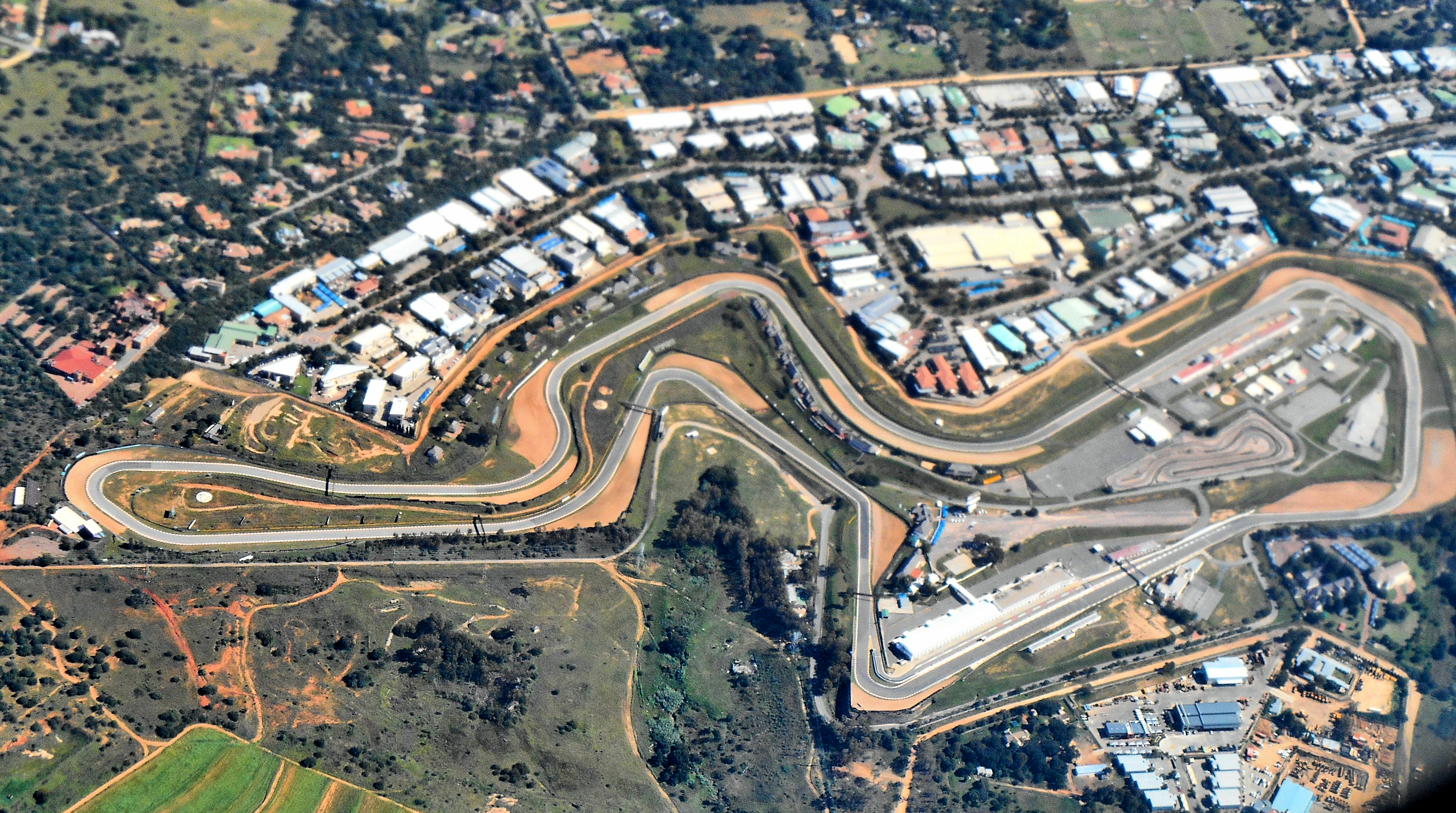
Kyalami Grand Prix Circuit

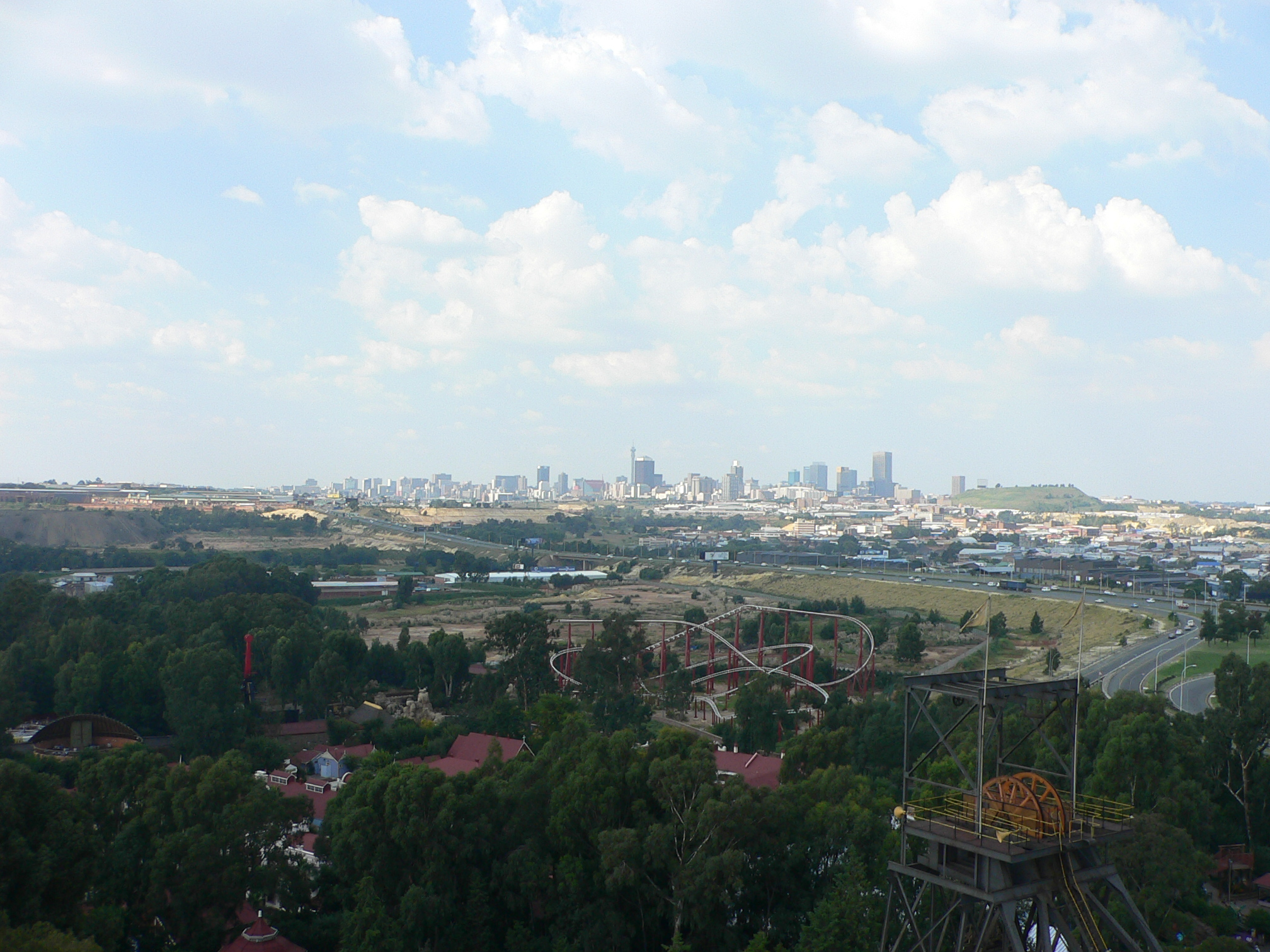
Gold Reef City amusement park

Gauteng's favourable weather conditions throughout the year make it an ideal hub for sports and other outdoor activities.

The province is home to many stadiums and sporting grounds, notably Soccer City, Ellis Park Stadium, Odi Stadium, Loftus Versfeld Stadium, Lucas Moripe Stadium, Giant Stadium, Orlando Stadium, Johannesburg Stadium, the Wanderers Stadium and SuperSport Park.

Several teams from Gauteng play in the country's top-level soccer league, the Premiership, including Mamelodi Sundowns, SuperSport United, Kaizer Chiefs and Orlando Pirates. The national squad Bafana Bafana frequently play at Soccer City in Johannesburg. During the 2010 FIFA World Cup, the first world cup held by an African nation, Gauteng's stadia hosted many games. The first FIFA world cup match on African soil took place at Soccer City on 11 June 2010. Along with Soccer City, Loftus Versfeld Stadium and Ellis Park Stadium hosted matches in Gauteng.

Rugby, or more accurately rugby union, is a popular sport in South Africa, and in Gauteng in particular. Two rugby teams from Gauteng participate in the United Rugby Championship: the Pretoria-based Bulls, and the Johannesburg-based Lions. Three Gauteng-based teams play in the country's domestic competition, the Currie Cup: the Blue Bulls from Pretoria, the Golden Lions from Johannesburg and the Falcons from the East Rand. In 1995, South Africa hosted the 1995 Rugby World Cup and proceeded to win the tournament at Ellis Park Stadium on 24 June 1995. The events surrounding the world cup formed the basis of the story for the movie Invictus.

Many South African universities take part in the Varsity Rugby league. Of these, the Gauteng universities include the University of Pretoria, the University of Johannesburg and the University of the Witwatersrand.

Cricket is also widely popular among all cultural groups. The Highveld Lions represent both Gauteng and North West in the country's three domestic competitions—the first-class CSA 4-Day Domestic Series, the List A one-day CSA One-Day Cup and the Twenty20 CSA T20 Challenge.

Many marathons take place in Gauteng, such as the Soweto Marathon, Gauteng Marathon, the Arwyp Medical Centre 15 km Nite Race and the Trisport Joburg City Triathlon.

Golf, horse racing and swimming are also popular. The Vaal River facilitates water sports in the forms of jet skiing, water skiing and motor boating. Adventure sports are also quite popular in Gauteng, particularly skydiving, paragliding and hang-gliding.

The amusement park Gold Reef City is situated in Gauteng, as is the Johannesburg Zoo and the Pretoria Zoo. Botanical gardens in the province include the Pretoria and Walter Sisulu national botanical gardens maintained by the South African National Botanical Institute as well as the Johannesburg and Manie van der Schijff botanical gardens.

The Ticketpro Dome and the Gallagher Convention Centre, which are both popular events and expos venues, are also located within Gauteng. The province also has a Formula One racetrack, the Kyalami Circuit. The most recent F1 race at the venue was in 1993.

== See also ==
- List of speakers of the Gauteng Provincial Legislature
- South Deep mine
