= 2026 in South Africa =

- Decades: 2000s; 2010s; 2020s; 2030s
- See also: List of years in South Africa

Events in the year 2026 in South Africa.

== Events ==
=== January ===
- 3 January – A car and a minibus taxi collide in Fouriesburg, killing six people.
- 6 January – President Cyril Ramaphosa announces the appointment of Andy Mothibi as the new National Director of Public Prosecutions, replacing the retiring Shamila Batohi.
- 15 January – Authorities close the Kruger National Park to day visitors due to severe flooding caused by rivers overflowing after days of heavy rain. The government declares a national disaster on 18 January after 30 deaths are reported.
- 19 January – A truck and a school minibus collide in Vanderbijlpark, Gauteng, killing 14 people and injuring five others.
- 22 January –
  - South Africa announces its withdrawal from engagements of the G20 for the duration of the United States' rotating presidency over the group.
  - Four people, including the perpetrator, are killed in a school shooting in Ntabankulu, Eastern Cape.
- 27–31 January – West Indian cricket team in South Africa in 2025–26
- 29 January – A truck and a school minibus collide near Durban, killing 11 people.
- 30 January – South Africa expels the Israeli charge d’affaires, Ariel Seidman, following the posting of official social media posts insulting President Ramaphosa, and a deliberate failure to inform South Africa of visits by Israeli officials.

=== February ===
- 2 February – A white separatist group, Boervolk of the Orange Free State, files a formal claim in the Government Gazette of South Africa seeking land in KwaZulu-Natal, citing historical transactions with Zulu rulers and invoking the Declaration on the Granting of Independence to Colonial Countries and Peoples.
- 4 February – John Steenhuisen announces that he would not stand for reelection as leader of the Democratic Alliance in a party conference scheduled in April.
- 6–22 February – South Africa at the 2026 Winter Olympics
- 6 February – The government announces the resumption of domestic production of vaccines for foot-and-mouth disease for the first time since 2005.
- 7 February – South Africa announces the withdrawal of its military contingent from the United Nations Organization Stabilization Mission in the Democratic Republic of the Congo (MONUSCO).
- 8 February – Roedean School for Girls in Johannesburg cancels a tennis match against King David High School Linksfield, leading to allegations of antisemitism. The South African Jewish Board of Deputies condemned the decision, citing a leaked recording of staff admitting to parental pressure. Roedean denied antisemitism, blaming administrative issues.
- 9 February – A man is fatally shot in Randburg, Johannesburg, during the filming of a television production linked to an alleged anti-drug operation, leading the South African Police Service to open a murder investigation.
- 10 February – 1 March – Pakistan women's cricket team in South Africa in 2025–26
- 12 February – President Ramaphosa delivers the 2026 State of the Nation Address in Cape Town, announcing military support for police against crime, gang violence in the Western Cape, and illegal mining in Gauteng. He also declares foot-and-mouth disease a national disaster, pledging criminal charges for officials failing to provide water services.
- 13 February – A woman is arrested for the murder of a 22-year-old e-hailing driver in Pretoria West who was allegedly killed by a man and woman who requested a ride on 11 February.
- 19 February –
  - A bus crashes along the N1 in Limpopo, killing four people and injuring 31 others.
  - A mudslide occurs inside a gold mining shaft in Kimberley, leaving five miners missing and presumed dead.
  - A chemical factory fire breaks out in Germiston, killing one person.
  - Police arrest Bellarmine Mugabe, the youngest son of former Zimbabwean president Robert Mugabe, in Johannesburg on charges of attempted murder after a gardener was shot at his residence.
- 26 February – Two people are killed and two are injured in a taxi industry turf-related shooting outside Atlantis Senior Secondary in Cape Town.

=== March ===
- 2 March – A floor collapses in an under-construction building in Johannesburg, killing nine people.
- 12 March – The Department of Forestry, Fisheries and the Environment intercepts four Chinese-flagged fishing vessels for illegally entering its territorial waters, fining their owners R400,000 before allowing the ships to depart.
- 30 March – Five people are killed and three are injured after a car crashes between Hopefield and Langebaanweg in the Western Cape.
- 31 March – The government announces a temporary one-month reduction of the general fuel levy by 3 rand per litre for April, citing pressure from trade unions to mitigate rising fuel costs linked to the 2026 Iran war.

=== April ===
- 12 April – Geordin Hill-Lewis is elected as leader of the Democratic Alliance following a party congress in Johannesburg.
- 14 April – Roelf Meyer, a former chief government negotiator during Apartheid, is appointed by President Ramaphosa as South Africa’s ambassador to the United States.
- 16 April –
  - Julius Malema, leader of the Economic Freedom Fighters, is sentenced to five years’ imprisonment for unlawful possession and discharge of a firearm.
  - Beninese political activist Kémi Séba and his son are arrested in Pretoria on charges of criminal conspiracy.
- 23 April –
  - President Ramaphosa suspends General Fannie Masemola as head of the South African Police Service amid an investigation into the awarding of a $21 million health contract.
  - A court in Pretoria orders the Zambian government to return the body of former Zambian president Edgar Lungu, shortly after it had been transferred to state custody.

=== May ===
- 8 May – The Constitutional Court rules that parliament’s 2022 decision blocking impeachment proceedings against President Ramaphosa was unconstitutional, reviving the “Farmgate” inquiry into the 2020 Phala Phala robbery. Ramaphosa files a legal challenge against the independent panel three weeks later.
- 12 May – A state of natural disaster is declared following flooding and storms that leave 10 people dead in six provinces.
- 21 May – A minibus collides with a bus on the R39 road near Standerton, Mpumalanga, killing 10 people and injuring one.
- 24 May –
  - Mamelodi Sundowns F.C. wins the CAF Champions League after drawing 1–1 with AS FAR in Rabat, securing a 2-1 aggregate victory for their second continental title.
  - At the Cape Town Marathon in Cape Town, Ethiopian Mohamed Esa wins the men’s race in a course-record time of 2:04:55, with compatriot Dera Dida winning the women’s race in 2:23:18.
- 27 May – Authorities seize more than 700 kg (1,500 lb) of methaqualone valued at nearly one billion rand ($61 million) from a truck near the Zimbabwean border that originated from Malawi, resulting in three arrests.
- 28 May – The Democratic Alliance gains a 100% demographically black township ward from the ANC in a by-election for the first time in the country's history, in Evaton, Emfuleni.

=== June ===
- 4 June – The Southern Africa Litigation Centre (SALC) sues the national government in the North Gauteng High Court in Pretoria, seeking to suspend or set aside South African arms export permits to the United States.
- 9 June – 2026 Johannesburg shooting: Twelve people are killed, and nine others injured, when gunmen open fire at multiple locations in the Jumpers informal settlement in Cleveland, east of Johannesburg.
- 25 June – 2026 FIFA World Cup: South Africa defeat South Korea 1–0 in their final Group A match, with Thapelo Maseko scoring the winning goal, to qualify for the knockout stage of the tournament for the first time in the country's history.
- 30 June – Nationwide protests against illegal migrants, as part of the 2026 anti-immigrant movement in South Africa, are held on the deadline set by anti-migrant organisations for undocumented migrants to leave the country. Most marches remain peaceful, but unrest leads to police intervention and more than 900 arrests.

=== July ===
- 10 July – Police arrest Ndodana Tshuma in Johannesburg on an Interpol Red Notice after he was charged in the United Kingdom with the murders of his wife and two daughters. The extradition proceedings to the UK are initiated immediately.
- 13 July – Police open an investigation into the death of footballer Jayden Adams after his body is found dead in Cape Town following his return from the 2026 FIFA World Cup.
- 24 July – The High Court grants President Ramaphosa an interim order temporarily halting Parliament's impeachment inquiry into the 2020 Phala Phala robbery, pending a judicial review of an independent panel's report.
- 25 July – At the 2026 Commonwealth Games in Glasgow, swimmer Chad le Clos becomes the most decorated male athlete in Commonwealth Games history; winning bronze in the men's 4×100 m freestyle relay, earning a record 19th medal.

=== August ===
- 10 August – At least 14 suspected illegal miners are killed while eight others are injured when a disused mine dump collapses near Rustenburg, North West, while they were unlawfully extracting platinum group metals.

=== September ===
- 3 September – Victims of the 1960 Sharpeville massacre sue the Government of South Africa, seeking to overturn a 65-year-old law preventing them from receiving compensation.
- 13 September – At least 21 people are killed in a multi-vehicle crash in the Western Cape.
- 22 September – Eleven people are killed when gunmen open fire at a house in KwaMakhutha.
- 26 September – Eighteen people are killed in a gun attack on a bar in Wadela township, Johannesburg.
- 27 September – Ten people are killed in a gun attack on an entertainment venue in Lwandle, near Cape Town.

=== October ===
- 7 October – The Gauteng High Court overturns the government’s Black economic empowerment code for the legal sector, citing a failure to independently assess and justify the measures before approval.
- 9 October – Jurist Navi Pillay is awarded the Nobel Peace Prize.
- 13 October – Four people are killed and three others are injured in a shooting at a memorial service in Katlehong, Gauteng.
- 20 October – Orient Beach is closed following a shark attack that kills a 65-year-old woman swimming off the coast in East London, Eastern Cape.
- 29 October – The South African Sports Confederation and Olympic Committee (SASCOC) announces Durban as South Africa’s preferred candidate city to host the 2036 or 2040 Summer Olympic Games.

=== November ===
- 2 November – Lastborn Shazi, an opposition party organiser of the uMkhonto weSizwe Party, is shot dead at his home in KwaZulu-Natal ahead of the municipal elections.
- 4 November – 2026 South African municipal elections
- 16 November –
  - Nine people are killed in a mass shooting at a shack near Pretoria.
  - Eight people are found shot and killed inside a vehicle in Msunduzi Local Municipality, KwaZulu-Natal.

== Art and entertainment ==
- List of South African submissions for the Academy Award for Best International Feature Film

== Holidays ==
- 1 January – New Year's Day
- 21 March – Human Rights Day
- 3 April – Good Friday
- 6 April – Family Day
- 27 – 28 April – Freedom Day
- 1 May – International Workers' Day
- 16 June – Youth Day
- 9 – 10 August – National Women's Day
- 24 September – Heritage Day
- 16 December – Day of Reconciliation
- 25 December – Christmas Day
- 26 December – Day of Goodwill

== Deaths ==
- 3 January – Errol Moorcroft, 85, member of the House of Assembly (1981–1987, 1989–1994) and National Assembly (1999–2004).
- 4 March – Mosiuoa Lekota, 77, Anti-apartheid activist, defence minister (1999–2008) and president of COPE (2008–2026).
- 19 March – Nicholas Haysom, 73, diplomat, special representative of the Secretary-General (since 2021) and head of the UN Mission in South Sudan (since 2016).
- 23 March – Nkosentsha Shezi, 50, member of the National Assembly (since 2024).
- 20 April – Cynthia Shange, 76, model and actress (Muvhango).
- 27 April – Mimi Coertse, 93, soprano singer.
- 16 May – Bushy Maape, 68, premier of North West (2021–2024).
- 23 May – Eugene Cussons, 46, primatologist, director of Chimp Eden.
- 4 June – Edward Ntshingila, member of the National Assembly (since 2024).
- 9 June – Cyril Karabus, 91, Apartheid-era paediatric oncologist.
- 15 June – Abdullah Ibrahim, 91, jazz pianist and anti-apartheid activist.
- 4 July – Ntuthuko Mahlaba, 44, member of the KwaZulu-Natal Legislature (since 2022).
- 8 July – Dieter Gerhardt, 90, naval officer and spy.
- 11 July – Jayden Adams, 25, footballer (Stellenbosch, Mamelodi Sundowns, national team).
- 16 July – Tersia Marshall, 45, Mpumalanga MPL (since 2024).
- 23 July – Thembeni Nxangisa, Free State MPL (since 2019).
- 10 August – Mzikayifane Khumalo, 54, Gauteng MPL (since 2019).
- 20 August – Fikile Mokgohloa, 65, judge of the Supreme Court of Appeal (since 2019).
- 21 August – Zolani Tete, 38, boxer.
- 16 October – Hyron Andrews, 31, rugby union player (Lions, Sharks).
- 29 October – Desmond D'Sa, 70, environmentalist.
- 1 November – Sheila Lapinsky, 82, anti-apartheid and LGBTQ+ activist.
- 20 November – Phumzile Mlambo-Ngcuka, 71, deputy president (2005–2008) and executive director of UN Women (2013–2021).

== See also ==
=== Country overviews ===
- History of South Africa
- History of modern South Africa
- Outline of South Africa
- Government of South Africa
- Politics of South Africa
- National Council of Provinces (NCOP)
- National Assembly of South Africa
- Timeline of South Africa history

=== Related timelines for current period ===
- Timeline of South Africa
- 2020s
- 2020s in political history
