= 2025 in South Africa =

- Decades: 2000s; 2010s; 2020s
- See also: List of years in South Africa

Events in the year 2025 in South Africa.

== Incumbents ==
- President: Cyril Ramaphosa (ANC)
- Deputy President: Paul Mashatile (ANC)
- Chief Justice: Mandisa Maya
- Deputy Chief Justice: Mbuyiseli Madlanga
- President of the Supreme Court of Appeal: Mahube Molemela
- Deputy President of the Supreme Court of Appeal: Dumisani Zondi
- Chairperson of the Electoral Court of South Africa: DH Zondi
- Speaker of the National Assembly: Thoko Didiza (ANC)
- Deputy Speaker of the National Assembly: Annelie Lotriet (DA)
- Leader of the Opposition in the National Assembly: John Hlophe (uMkhonto weSizwe)
- Leader of Government Business: David Mabuza (ANC)
- Government Chief Whip (of the National Assembly): Pemmy Majodina (ANC)
- Opposition Chief Whip (of the National Assembly): Siviwe Gwarube (DA)
- Chairperson of the National Council of Provinces: Refilwe Mtsweni-Tsipane (ANC)
- Deputy Chairperson of the National Council of Provinces: Sylvia Lucas (ANC)
- Leader of the Opposition of the National Council of Provinces: Cathlene Labuschagne (DA)
- Chief Whip of the National Council of Provinces: Seiso Mohai (ANC)

=== Cabinet ===
The Cabinet, together with the President and the Deputy President, forms the Executive.

=== Provincial Premiers ===
- Eastern Cape Province: Oscar Mabuyane (ANC)
- Free State Province: Mxolisi Dukwana (ANC)
- Gauteng Province: Panyaza Lesufi (ANC)
- KwaZulu-Natal Province: Thami Ntuli
- Limpopo Province: Phophi Ramathuba
- Mpumalanga Province: Mandla Ndlovu
- North West Province: Lazarus Mokgosi
- Northern Cape Province: Zamani Saul (ANC)
- Western Cape Province: Alan Winde (DA)

== Events ==
=== January ===
- 6 January – A truck crashes into a minibus and another vehicle on Van Reenen's Pass in KwaZulu-Natal, killing 18 people and seriously injuring an infant.
- 9 January – One person is killed in a rockfall at the Blyvoor Gold mine near Carletonville.
- 15 January – At least 78 miners are confirmed dead and 246 others are rescued following the end of protracted rescue efforts at the closed Buffelsfontein mine in North West Province that began in July 2024.
- 19 January – A bus crashes into a concrete centre barrier along the N2 highway between Nanaga and Makhanda in Eastern Cape, killing five people and injuring six others.
- 27 January – A fire at the Booysens slum in Johannesburg destroys 1,500 homes and displaces hundreds of residents.
- 30 January – MP Duduzile Zuma-Sambudla, the daughter of former president Jacob Zuma, is arrested on terrorism charges on suspicion of inciting violence on social media that contributed to the 2021 South African unrest.

=== February ===
- 7 February – US President Donald Trump orders a halt in US aid for South Africa after accusing it of confiscating land under new land laws and for its genocide case against Israel.
- 8 February – A pickup truck and a minibus taxi collide head on in Kapama, Limpopo, killing 13.
- 15 February – Muhsin Hendricks, described as the world's first openly gay imam, is shot dead in an ambush near Gqeberha.
- 19 February – The annual presentation of the government budget is abruptly canceled for the first time since the end of apartheid in 1994 and is moved to March amid opposition by the Democratic Alliance to a 2% increase in value-added tax proposed by the African National Congress.
- 23 February – A wildfire breaks out at Table Mountain in Cape Town.

=== March ===
- 9 March – A bus crashes through a barrier and plunges down an embankment in KwaZulu-Natal, killing nine people and injuring 35 others.
- 11 March – A bus overturns near O. R. Tambo International Airport, killing 16 people and injuring 35 others.
- 13 March – South Africa announces the withdrawal of its military contingent from the Southern African Development Community peacekeeping mission to the eastern Democratic Republic of the Congo.
- 14 March – The United States declares South African Ambassador Ebrahim Rasool persona non grata, accusing him of remarks against Donald Trump.

=== April ===
- 2 April – The Democratic Alliance votes against the passage of the government budget despite being part of the unity government. The budget passes with support from non-coalition member ActionSA.
- 10 April – American pastor Joh Sullivan is abducted while conducting a church service in Gqeberha. He is rescued on 14 April following a shootout that leaves three of his kidnappers dead.
- 14 April – The National Prosecuting Authority reopens an inquest into the death of Nobel laureate and ANC president Albert Luthuli in 1967.
- 25 April – A wildfire breaks out at Table Mountain in Cape Town, destroying 3,000 hectares of vegetation and prompting the evacuation of 200 residents.
- 29 April – Five people, including three police officers, are found dead along the Hennops River near Pretoria.

=== May ===
- 3 May – A minibus taxi and a pickup-truck collide head-on in the Eastern Cape, killing 15 people.
- 8 May –
  - At least 123 vultures are killed in a mass poisoning caused by the consumption of an elephant carcass laced by poachers with pesticides at Kruger National Park.
  - The bodies of Pretoria-based radio journalist Sibusiso Aserie Ndlovu and his partner, both of whom went missing on 18 February, are discovered in Limpopo Province.
- 12 May – The Trump administration brings the first group of white South Africans to the United States through its refugee program. South Africa's foreign ministry calls the move "politically motivated."
- 16 May – The World Anti-Doping Agency revokes the accreditation of Africa's only recognized drug-testing laboratory, located in Bloemfontein, citing "inability to satisfactorily address multiple nonconformities".
- 22 May – An incident at a gold mine outside Johannesburg leaves over 260 miners stranded underground.

=== June ===
- 8 June – A light aircraft crashes near Greytown, KwaZulu-Natal, killing all three people on board.
- 10 June – At least 101 people are killed following floods in the Mthatha area.
- 14 June – South Africa wins its first major international cricket title since 1998 after defeating Australia by five wickets at the 2025 ICC World Test Championship final in London.
- 17 June – A bus and a truck collide near Vryheid, KwaZulu-Natal, killing 12 people and injuring 30 others.
- 23 June – A mini-bus taxi and a truck bus collide near Delmas, Mpumalanga, killing 10 people and injuring 24 others.
- 25 June – The Pretoria High Court orders a suspension of the private burial of former president Edgar Lungu in South Africa amid a dispute between Lungu's family and the Zambian government over the funeral arrangements.
- 28 June – The Democratic Alliance announces its withdrawal from the national dialogue due to coalition disputes but remains in the Government of National Unity.

=== July ===
- 2 July – Outbreaks of the H5N1 strain of avian influenza are reported in two poultry farms in Mkhondo, Mpumalanga and Tswaing, North West.
- 13 July – Senzo Mchunu is suspended as police minister by President Ramaphosa amid allegations of the former's involvement with organized crime groups.

=== August ===
- 3 August – An American hunter is killed by a Cape buffalo during a hunting expedition in Limpopo.
- 7 August – Charges against Adrian de Wet, accused in a farm murder case near Polokwane, are officially withdrawn; he turns state witness and is released from custody.
- 8 August – The Pretoria High Court orders the family of deceased former Zambian president Edgar Lungu to repatriate his remains to Zambia and allow the Zambian government to hold a state funeral for him. A final appeal by Lungu's family is rejected on 16 September.
- 19 August – John Hume, the former owner of the Platinum Rhino site that was formerly the world's largest rhinoceros farm located in North West, is arrested on suspicion of trafficking 964 rhino horns to the black market in Southeast Asia.
- 27 August – Economic Freedom Fighters leader Julius Malema is convicted of hate speech by the Equality Court over comments he made at a political rally in 2022.

=== September ===
- 10 September – Seven Chinese nationals are sentenced to 20 years' imprisonment for human trafficking and kidnapping following the discovery of a sweatshop in Johannesburg that employed 91 Malawians smuggled into the country.
- 11 September – The Constitutional Court of South Africa suspends a law barring men from taking their wives' surnames, calling it gender discrimination.
- 12 September –
  - The government reopens an investigation into the death of anti-apartheid activist Steve Biko in 1977.
  - A judge rejects a petition by convicted rapist and murderer Thabo Bester and his partner Nandipha Magudumana to prevent Netflix from releasing a documentary series about him titled Beauty and the Bester, saying that the issue is in the public domain.
- 19 September – A hospital cleaner is arrested in Lydenburg, Mpumalanga, after being found with a bag of human placentas; she faces charges of illegal possession of human tissues.
- 30 September – Ambassador to France Nathi Mthethwa is found dead in Paris in a suspected suicide.

=== October ===
- 1 October – EFF leader Julius Malema is convicted by the East London Magistrates Court of breaking firearms laws over his firing of a rifle at a political rally in 2018.
- 3 October – The Constitutional Court rules that all parents are entitled to equal parental leave, declaring parts of the labour law unconstitutional and giving Parliament three years to amend it.
- 4 October – South Africa beat Argentina 29-27 at Twickenham Stadium to retain the Rugby Championship, winning their sixth title on points difference.
- 9 October – The University of Fort Hare suspends activities after student protests set four campus buildings on fire, injuring two students.
- 12 October – A bus falls off a mountain pass along the N1 National Route near Louis Trichardt, killing 42 people and injuring 49 others.
- 14 October – South Africa qualifies for the 2026 FIFA World Cup after defeating Rwanda 3-0 at the 2026 FIFA World Cup qualification in Mbombela.
- 21 October – Two teenagers are killed and five wounded in a suspected gang-related shooting in Johannesburg.
- 30 October – A court in Pietermaritzburg rules that anti-apartheid leader Albert Luthuli was beaten to death in 1967, overturning a previous finding of accidental death.

=== November ===
- 10 November – Duduzile Zuma-Sambudla pleads not guilty in the Durban High Court to charges of inciting violence during the 2021 South African unrest.
- 12 November –
  - President Ramaphosa appoints Willie Aucamp as Minister of Forestry, Fisheries and Environment and Alexandra Abrahams as Deputy Minister of Trade, Industry and Competition.
  - South Africa admits 130 Palestinians at O.R. Tambo International Airport after initially blocking entry over missing travel documentation, following a humanitarian accommodation offer.
- 21 November – The government classifies gender-related violence and femicide as a national disaster following nationwide protests and a large-scale public campaign coordinated by Women For Change.
- 22 November – Springbok hooker Malcolm Marx receives the World Rugby Men’s 15s Player of the Year award, becoming the fourth South African to earn the honour.
- 22–23 November – 2025 G20 Johannesburg summit.
- 28 November – Duduzile Zuma-Sambudla resigns from the National Assembly amid allegations that she had recruited 17 South Africans to fight as mercenaries for the Russian war effort in Ukraine.
- 29 November – Police arrest four men at O. R. Tambo International Airport suspected of being recruited to fight in Russia; President Ramaphosa orders an official investigation into the recruitment and the 17 South Africans already in Ukraine.

=== December ===
- 1 December – South Africa begins administering the HIV prevention injection drug lenacapavir.
- 2 December – Two former police officers are convicted by the Gauteng High Court for the murder of anti-apartheid activist Caiphus Nyoka in 1987.
- 6 December – 2025 Saulsville shooting: A mass shooting takes place at a shebeen in Saulsville township near Pretoria, killing at least 12.
- 8 December – South Africa withdraws its 90-day visa-free entry policy for Palestinian nationals in response to the landing of unauthorized charter flights carrying Palestinians on its territory.
- 12 December – Five people are killed following a collapse at an under-construction building at a Hindu temple in Verulam, KwaZulu-Natal.
- 21 December – Ten people are killed and nine injured in a mass shooting at a shebeen in Bekkersdal, Gauteng.
- 27 December – Two cars collide head-on on the N4 toll road near Belfast, Mpumalanga, killing seven and injuring one.
- 28 December – Three people are killed, including a toddler, and three others are injured following a collapse of a two-story building in Soweto.

== Art and entertainment ==
- List of South African submissions for the Academy Award for Best International Feature Film

== Holidays ==
- 1 January – New Year's Day
- 21 March – Human Rights Day
- 18 April – Good Friday
- 21 April – Family Day
- 27–28 April – Freedom Day
- 1 May – International Workers' Day
- 16 June – Youth Day
- 9 August – National Women's Day
- 24 September – Heritage Day
- 16 December – Day of Reconciliation
- 25 December – Christmas Day
- 26 December – Day of Goodwill

== Deaths ==
- January 6: Olga Meshoe Washington, 42, lawyer.
- January 7: Winnie Khumalo, 51, singer and actress.
- January 9: Doc Shebeleza, 51, kwaito musician.
- January 10: Wynand Havenga, 59, darts player.
- January 13: Niel Barnard, 75, director-general of the National Intelligence Service (1979–1992).
- March 8: Athol Fugard, 92, playwright, novelist, actor and director.
- May 14: Cornal Hendricks, 37, rugby player (Bulls, Boland Cavaliers, national team).
- May 18: Lungi Gcabashe, 64, MNA (2014–2019, since 2024).
- May 22: Gertrude Shope, 99, politician.
- May 27: Presley Chweneyagae, 40, actor (Tsotsi).
- July 3: David Mabuza, 64, deputy president (2018–2023).
- August 27: Mathilda Bains, 67, Permanent Delegate to the National Council of Provinces from the Western Cape (since 2024).
- September 5: Ruth Weiss, 101, German-born writer.
- September 30: Nathi Mthethwa, 58, minister of sport, arts and culture (2019–2023) and ambassador to France (since 2024)
- December 4: Edward Gabriel Risi, 76, Roman Catholic prelate, bishop of Keimoes–Upington (since 2000)
- December 16: DJ Warras, 40, DJ and television presenter

== See also ==
=== Country overviews ===
- History of South Africa
- History of modern South Africa
- Outline of South Africa
- Government of South Africa
- Politics of South Africa
- National Council of Provinces (NCOP)
- National Assembly of South Africa
- Timeline of South Africa history

=== Related timelines for current period ===
- Timeline of South Africa
- 2020s
- 2020s in political history
