= 2024 in South Africa =

- Decades: 2000s; 2010s; 2020s
- See also: List of years in South Africa

Events in the year 2024 in South Africa.

== Incumbents ==
- President: Cyril Ramaphosa (ANC)
- Deputy President: Paul Mashatile (ANC) starting
- Chief Justice:
  - Raymond Zondo
  - Mandisa Maya from 1 September 2024
- Deputy Chief Justice:
  - Mandisa Maya
  - Mbuyiseli Madlanga from 1 September 2024
- President of the Supreme Court of Appeal: Mahube Molemela
- Deputy President of the Supreme Court of Appeal: Dumisani Zondi
- Chairperson of the Electoral Court of South Africa: Boissie Henry Mbha
- Speaker of the National Assembly: Thoko Didiza (ANC)
- Deputy Speaker of the National Assembly: Annelie Lotriet (DA)
- Leader of the Opposition in the National Assembly: John Steenhuisen (DA)
- Leader of Government Business: David Mabuza (ANC)
- Government Chief Whip (of the National Assembly): Pemmy Majodina (ANC)
- Opposition Chief Whip (of the National Assembly): Siviwe Gwarube (DA)
- Chairperson of the National Council of Provinces: Amos Masondo (ANC)
- Deputy Chairperson of the National Council of Provinces: Sylvia Lucas (ANC)
- Leader of the Opposition of the National Council of Provinces: Cathlene Labuschagne (DA)
- Chief Whip of the National Council of Provinces: Seiso Mohai (ANC)

=== Cabinet ===
The Cabinet, together with the President and the Deputy President, forms the Executive.

=== Provincial Premiers ===
- Eastern Cape Province: Oscar Mabuyane (ANC)
- Free State Province: Mxolisi Dukwana (ANC)
- Gauteng Province: Panyaza Lesufi (ANC)
- KwaZulu-Natal Province: Nomusa Dube-Ncube (ANC), Thami Ntuli
- Limpopo Province: Stanley Mathabatha (ANC), Phophi Ramathuba, Klaas Molokomme
- Mpumalanga Province: Refilwe Mtsweni-Tsipane (ANC), Mandla Ndlovu
- North West Province: Bushy Maape (ANC), Lazarus Mokgosi
- Northern Cape Province: Zamani Saul (ANC)
- Western Cape Province: Alan Winde (DA)

== Events ==
=== January ===
- 5 January – Former Paralympic athlete Oscar Pistorius is released on parole after serving eight and a half years in prison for the 2013 murder of his girlfriend Reeva Steenkamp.
- 11 January – South Africa v. Israel (Genocide Convention): A two-day public hearing begins at the Peace Palace in The Hague regarding alleged violations by Israel of its obligations under the 1948 Genocide Convention and international law in relation to Palestinians in the Gaza Strip.
- 13 January–4 February 2024 Under-19 Cricket World Cup
- 26 January – South Africa v. Israel (Genocide Convention): The International Court of Justice rules that it has jurisdiction to rule in the case and orders Israel to take measures to prevent acts of genocide in the Gaza Strip and report back in one month, prevent and punish incitement to genocide in the Gaza Strip and allow humanitarian aid into the Gaza Strip while taking more measures to protect Palestinians. However, the court does not require Israel to end military operations.
- 29 January – Former President of South Africa Jacob Zuma is suspended from the African National Congress, the party he led from 2007 to 2017.

=== February ===
- 25 February – Nine people are killed and 17 others are injured in a bus crash near Paulpietersburg.

=== March ===
- 28 March – Mamatlakala highway accident: A bus accident in Limpopo kills at least 45 people, all citizens of Botswana.

=== April ===
- 3 April – Nosiviwe Mapisa-Nqakula resigns as Speaker of the National Assembly over an anti-corruption probe.
- 4 April – Nosiviwe Mapisa-Nqakula surrenders to police and is charged with 12 counts of corruption and one count of money laundering.

=== May ===
- 6 May – Thirty-three people are killed after an under-construction building collapses in George, Western Cape.
- 20 May – The Constitutional Court of South Africa rules that former President Jacob Zuma is ineligible to run in the upcoming parliamentary election due to his 2021 jail sentence.
- 29 May – 2024 South African general election: The African National Congress loses its majority in the National Assembly for the first time since 1994, forcing the creation of a coalition government.

=== June ===
- 4 June – Eleven people are killed after two tornadoes strike different parts of KwaZulu-Natal.
- 5 June – Sports, Arts and Culture minister Zizi Kodwa is arrested and charged with taking bribes during a corruption inquiry in 2021.
- 6 June – South Africa's genocide case against Israel: Spain applies to join South Africa’s case at the International Court of Justice accusing Israel of genocide.
- 11 June:
  - Former South African president Jacob Zuma and his party uMkhonto weSizwe files a petition in the Constitutional Court seeking to block the newly elected parliament from sitting, citing vote-rigging. The Constitutional Court dismisses the petition on 13 June.
  - A patient dies from mpox in Tembisa Hospital, making him the first recorded fatality from the disease in South Africa.
- 12 June – The Inkatha Freedom Party says that it will join a unity government with the African National Congress and the Democratic Alliance.
- 14 June – Cyril Ramaphosa is re-elected as President of South Africa for a second term.
- 19 June – Cyril Ramaphosa is sworn in for a second term as President of South Africa.
- 20 June – Democratic Alliance MP Renaldo Gouws is suspended after old videos of him making derogatory and inciteful remarks against black people emerge online.

=== July ===
- 1 July – President Cyril Ramaphosa unveils his cabinet made up of seven parties.
- 10 July – Thirteen people, including 12 children, are killed in a school bus crash in Merafong, Gauteng.
- 11 July – At least 4,500 people are displaced following storms in Cape Town that damage around 15,000 structures.
- 13 July – Six firefighters are killed in a wildfire believed to have been caused by poachers near Boston, KwaZulu-Natal.
- 18 July – The African Development Bank grants a $1 billion loan to the state rail and port company Transnet valid for 25 years.
- 25 July – President Ramaphosa appoints Mandisa Maya to become the first female Chief Justice of South Africa effective 1 September.
- 26 July – A raid on a farm suspected to double as a clandestine military training camp in White River, Mpumalanga leads to the arrest of 95 Libyan nationals.
- 27 July – Fourteen sites associated with the struggle against apartheid, including the site of the Sharpeville Massacre in 1960, the village of Mqhekezweni, and Nelson Mandela's alma mater, the University of Fort Hare, are designated as World Heritage Sites by UNESCO, along with three prehistoric sites in Western Cape and KwaZulu Natal.
- 29 July – Former President Jacob Zuma is formally expelled from the African National Congress for creating his own party, uMkhonto weSizwe.
- 29 July — Tatjana Smith wins a gold medal in the Women's 100 metre breaststroke representing South Africa at the 2024 Summer Olympics.

=== August ===
- 4 August – Ninety Ethiopian migrants believed to be victims of human trafficking are rescued in a police raid on a property in Johannesburg. Two suspects are arrested.
- 10 August – Mia le Roux becomes the first deaf person to win the Miss South Africa pageant.
- 24 August – South Africa blocks the transfer of 50,000 purchased artillery shells to Poland, citing concerns that they would be sent to Ukraine for use in the Russo-Ukrainian War.

=== September ===
- 2 September – A bus veers off Van Rhyns Pass in the Western Cape and rolls down a hill, killing 10 and injuring 29.
- 13 September – President Ramaphosa signs the Basic Education Laws Amendment into law, but suspends the implementation of two sections covering the language of instruction and admissions until December due to protests by the Democratic Alliance regarding the use of Afrikaans.
- 20 September – The first cases of rabies in Cape fur seals is confirmed in 24 specimen caught off the country's western and southern coasts.
- 21–22 September – Two people die from hypothermia after being stranded in snowstorms along the N3 highway leading to Durban.
- 27 September – 2024 Lusikisiki shootings: Eighteen people are killed in a mass shooting on two houses in Lusikisiki, Eastern Cape.

=== October ===
- 18 October – The Department of International Relations and Cooperation orders the transfer of the Taiwan Liaison Office in Pretoria to Johannesburg, which Taiwan rejects, calling a violation of a 1997 agreement made following the downgrading of their relations.

=== November ===
- 13 November – South African Football Association president Danny Jordaan is arrested on suspicion of embezzling R1.3 million ($72,372) of organisational funds to hire public relations and security firms for personal use.

== Art and entertainment ==
- List of South African submissions for the Academy Award for Best International Feature Film

== Deaths ==
=== January ===
- 1 January – Peter Magubane, 91, photographer.

=== March ===
- 12 March – Bheka Prince Mchunu, 45, radio presenter.
- 21 March – Markus Jooste, 63, former CEO of Steinhoff International

=== April ===
- 3 April – Luke Fleurs, 24, footballer.

=== July ===
- 25 July – Louis van Schoor, 72, serial killer.

=== August ===
- 6 August – Connie Chiume, 72, actress (Black Panther, Black Is King).
- 14 August – Zanele Mbokazi-Nkambule, 52, radio presenter.
- 31 August – Jessica Mbangeni, 47, poet and singer.
- 31 August – Thabiso Sikwane, 50, media personality, and author.

=== September ===
- 6 September – Mapaputsi, 45, singer
- 13 September - Pravin Gordhan, 75, politician and former cabinet minister, cancer
- 15 September – Sello Motloung, 53, actor and presenter
- 22 September – Koos van der Merwe, 87, MP

=== October ===
- 3 October – Solly Moholo, 65, singer-songwriter
- 8 October – Ray McCauley, 75, religious leader
- 12 October – Tito Mboweni, 65, politician and former cabinet minister
- 18 October – Membathisi Mdladlana, 72, politician, former minister of labour.

=== November ===
- 24 November – Breyten Breytenbach, 85, writer and poet

== Holidays ==
- 1 January - New Year's Day
- 21 March - Human Rights Day
- 29 March – Good Friday
- 1 April – Family Day
- 27 April – Freedom Day
- 1 May - International Workers' Day
- 16–17 June – Youth Day
- 9 August - National Women's Day
- 24 September – Heritage Day
- 16 December – Day of Reconciliation
- 25 December – Christmas Day
- 26 December – Day of Goodwill

== See also ==
=== Country overviews ===
- History of South Africa
- History of modern South Africa
- Outline of South Africa
- Government of South Africa
- Politics of South Africa
- National Council of Provinces (NCOP)
- National Assembly of South Africa
- Timeline of South Africa history

=== Related timelines for current period ===
- Timeline of South Africa
- 2020s
- 2020s in political history
