= 2027 in South Africa =

- Decades: 2000s; 2010s; 2020s
- See also: List of years in South Africa

Events in the year 2027 in South Africa.

== Planned or predicted events ==
- 2027 Cricket World Cup
- 2027 World Mountain and Trail Running Championships

== Holidays ==
- 1 January – New Year's Day
- 21 March – Human Rights Day
- 3 April – Good Friday
- 6 April – Family Day
- 27 – 28 April – Freedom Day
- 1 May – International Workers' Day
- 16 June – Youth Day
- 9 – 10 August – National Women's Day
- 24 September – Heritage Day
- 16 December – Day of Reconciliation
- 25 December – Christmas Day
- 26 December – Day of Goodwill
