= 2024 in Southern Africa =

The following lists events that happened during 2024 in Southern Africa. The countries are those described in the United Nations geoscheme for Southern Africa.

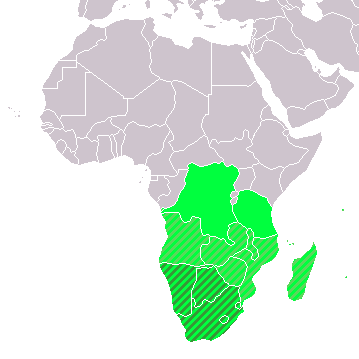
Southern Africa (UN subregion and the SACU) Geographical Southern Africa, including the UN subregion Southern African Development Community (SADC)

The combined population of Africa is estimated at 1,460.47 million (2023).

== Countries ==
=== Botswana ===
Botswana

=== Eswatini ===
Eswatini (Swaziland)

=== Lesotho ===
Lesotho

=== Namibia ===
Namibia

=== South Africa ===
South Africa

== Holidays ==
- 1 January - New Year's Day
- 21 March - Human Rights Day
- 29 March – Good Friday
- 1 April – Family Day
- 27 April – Freedom Day
- 1 May - International Workers' Day
- 16–17 June – Youth Day
- 9 August - National Women's Day
- 24 September – Heritage Day
- 16 December – Day of Reconciliation
- 25 December – Christmas Day
- 26 December – Day of Goodwill

== See also ==
- 2023–24 South-West Indian Ocean cyclone season
- 2024–25 South-West Indian Ocean cyclone season
- Southern African Development Community
- 2024 in South Africa
- 2020s
- 2020s in political history
- Common Market for Eastern and Southern Africa
- Southern African Development Community
