= 2023 in South Africa =

- Decades: 2000s; 2010s; 2020s
- See also: List of years in South Africa

Events in the year 2023 in South Africa.

== Incumbents ==
- President: Cyril Ramaphosa (ANC)
- Deputy President:
  - David Mabuza (ANC) until 28 February
  - Paul Mashatile (ANC) starting 7 March
- Chief Justice: Raymond Zondo
- Deputy Chief Justice: Mandisa Maya
- President of the Supreme Court of Appeal: Xola Petse (acting)
- Deputy President of the Supreme Court of Appeal: Nambitha Dambuza (acting)
- Chairperson of the Electoral Court of South Africa: Boissie Henry Mbha
- Speaker of the National Assembly: Nosiviwe Mapisa-Nqakula (ANC)
- Deputy Speaker of the National Assembly: Lechesa Tsenoli (ANC)
- Leader of the Opposition in the National Assembly: John Steenhuisen (DA)
- Leader of Government Business: David Mabuza (ANC)
- Government Chief Whip (of the National Assembly): Pemmy Majodina (ANC)
- Opposition Chief Whip (of the National Assembly): Siviwe Gwarube (DA)
- Chairperson of the National Council of Provinces: Amos Masondo (ANC)
- Deputy Chairperson of the National Council of Provinces: Sylvia Lucas (ANC)
- Leader of the Opposition of the National Council of Provinces: Cathlene Labuschagne (DA)
- Chief Whip of the National Council of Provinces: Seiso Mohai (ANC)

=== Cabinet ===
The Cabinet, together with the President and the Deputy President, forms the Executive.

=== Provincial Premiers ===
- Eastern Cape Province: Oscar Mabuyane (ANC)
- Free State Province: Sisi Ntombela (ANC)
- Gauteng Province: Panyaza Lesufi (ANC)
- KwaZulu-Natal Province: Nomusa Dube-Ncube (ANC)
- Limpopo Province: Stanley Mathabatha (ANC)
- Mpumalanga Province: Refilwe Mtsweni-Tsipane (ANC)
- North West Province: Bushy Maape (ANC)
- Northern Cape Province: Zamani Saul (ANC)
- Western Cape Province: Alan Winde (DA)

== Events ==
=== January ===
- 12 January – A truck crashes into several minibus taxis at an intersection in Roodepoort, Gauteng, killing five people and injuring nine others.
- 15 January – A light aircraft crashes in Nasrec, Johannesburg, South Africa, killing all three people on board.
- 27 January – South Africa agrees to send 12 cheetahs to India a year for the next 8 to 10 years to help establish a "viable and secure cheetah population" in the wild. The Asiatic cheetah became extinct in India in the 1940s due to hunting and habitat destruction.
- 29 January – Eight people are killed and three others are injured in a mass shooting at a birthday party in Gqeberha, Eastern Cape.

=== February ===
- 5 February – South Africa reports imported cases of cholera in two sisters who travelled to Malawi.
- 14 February – Twenty people are killed and 68 others injured during a head-on collision between a tour bus and an armoured cash-in-transit van in Makhado, Limpopo.

=== March ===
- 20 March – South Africa prepares for a "nationwide shutdown" as the military is deployed ahead of protests by the Economic Freedom Fighters.

=== June ===
- 2 June – In February 2023, South Africa experienced a cholera outbreak that grew from 2 initial cases to 99 confirmed cases in Tshwane over the following months. Jubilee Hospital reported 17 deaths. Efforts to contain the outbreak led to a significant decrease in new cases by June 2023.

=== July ===
- 5 July – 2023 Boksburg gas leak – 17 people, including three children, died in a suspected gas leak in the Angelo informal settlement in Boksburg. According to emergency services, the leak appeared to be linked to illegal mining activities.
- 12 July – Six people were shot dead and four wounded in KwaNobuhle, Eastern Cape, after three men entered the yard of a home and opened fire.
- 19 July – Ramaphosa announces Russian president Vladimir Putin will not physically attend the BRICs summit next month. As a member of the International Criminal Court, South Africa is obligated to arrest Putin if he shows up.
- 20 July – A suspected underground gas explosion rips open roads and flips vehicles in Johannesburg, killing one and injuring at least 48.

=== August ===
- 31 August – A large building fire in the central business district of Johannesburg kills at least 73 people.

=== September ===
- 1 September – Eighteen people are killed during a shootout between robbers and police in Limpopo.
- 20 September – Three members of the South African Navy are killed and five others are rescued when large waves hit a submarine near Kommetjie, Western Cape.

=== October ===
- 28 October – 2023 Rugby World Cup: South Africa wins a record fourth Webb Ellis Cup after defeating New Zealand 12–11 in the final.
- 30 October – President Cyril Ramaphosa announces the 15th of December as a public holiday in celebration of the sports achievements (2023 Rugby World Cup:South Africa)

=== November ===
- 20 November – Israel recalls its ambassador from South Africa after Minister in the Presidency Khumbudzo Ntshavheni called on the International Criminal Court to issue an arrest warrant against Prime Minister Benjamin Netanyahu.
- 27 November – Eleven workers are killed and 75 others are injured at an Impala platinum mine in Rustenburg, North West, when a lift transporting them to the surface drops approximately 200 metres (660 ft).

=== December ===
- 29 December – South Africa files the case South Africa v. Israel (Genocide Convention) against Israel at World Court.
- 30 December – Flash flooding kills 21 people in KwaZulu-Natal state.

=== Holidays ===
South Africa has 12 public holidays; if a holiday falls on a Sunday, it is celebrated the following Monday.

- 1 January – New Year's Day
- 21 March – Human Rights Day
- 27 April – Freedom Day (National day)
- 1 May - National Worker's Day
- 16 June – Youth Day
- 9 August – National Women's Day
- 24 September – Heritage Day
- 16 December - Reconciliation Day
- 25 December - Christmas Day
- 26 December - Day of Goodwill

== Deaths ==
=== January ===
- 8 January – Adriaan Vlok, 85, politician, minister of correctional services (1991–1994).

=== February ===
- 6 February – John Moeti, 55, South African footballer.
- 10 February – AKA, 35, South African rapper, drive-by shooting.

=== March ===
- 11 March – Costa Titch, 28, South African rapper.
- 25 March – Moosa Moolla, 88, Indian South African activist and diplomat.

=== May ===
- 14 May – Billy Masetlha, 68, South African intelligence officer.

=== June ===
- 5 June – Tina Joemat-Pettersson, 59, South African politician.
- 10 June – Clive Barker, 78, South African football coach.

=== July ===
- 6 July – Essop Pahad, 84, South African politician.

=== August ===
- 9 August – Doreen Mantle, 97, South African-born British actress (One Foot in the Grave, Jam & Jerusalem, Yentl).
- 22 August – Derek Watts, 74, South African investigative reporter and the presenter of Carte Blanche on M-Net, lung cancer.

=== September ===
- 9 September – Mangosuthu Buthelezi, 95, South African politician.
- 27 September – Aziz Pahad, 82, South African politician.

=== October ===
- 18 October – Mzwakhe Sibisi, 53, South African politician.

=== November ===
- 19 November – Hannes Strydom, 58, South African rugby union player.

=== December ===
- 11 December – Zahara, 36, South African singer and songwriter.
- 26 December – Alice Mthembu, 64, South African politician, car accident.
- 27 December – Mbongeni Ngema, 68, South African musician and playwright (Sarafina!, Woza Albert!), car accident.

== See also ==
=== Country overviews ===
- History of South Africa
- History of modern South Africa
- Outline of South Africa
- Government of South Africa
- Politics of South Africa
- National Council of Provinces (NCOP)
- National Assembly of South Africa
- Timeline of South Africa history

=== Related timelines for current period ===
- 2020s
- 2020s in political history
- COVID-19 pandemic in Africa
- COVID-19 pandemic in South Africa
- COVID-19 vaccination in South Africa
