= 2026 Ekurhuleni killings =

Series of murders in South Africa

- Location: In and around Ekurhuleni, east of Johannesburg
- Type: Murders
- Motive: unknown
- Deaths: 12
- Inquiries: South African Police Service

The 2026 Ekurhuleni killings are a series of killings of women in Ekurhuleni and surrounding areas east of Johannesburg, Gauteng, South Africa. As of September 2026, the South African Police Service were investigating the deaths of twelve women. The bodies were found over a period of about two months, starting on 15 July 2026. Investigators have not confirmed whether the killings are connected or whether a single perpetrator is responsible.

== Timeline ==
=== July ===
The first woman was found on 15 July, 2026 near the R21 freeway in Kempton Park. She was confirmed to be 37 years old . She was found restrained with cable ties and unclothed. On 17 July, a suspect was arrested and, as of September, remains in custody.

=== August ===
The body of 32-year-old Itumeleng Kekana was found on 3 August 2026. She had gone missing almost three weeks earlier, on 17 July. Kekana's body was found tied up and wrapped in a sheet, with cuts and bruises.

=== September ===
A third female victim was found in Kempton Park on 10 September and remains unidentified. On 9 September, 2026, the fourth victim, 38-year-old Elizabeth "Tsontso" Moselakgomo, was reported missing by her eight-year-old daughter after Moselakgomo did not return home from her evening run. Her body was found on 12 September 2026. The body of a fifth woman was found on 14 September 2026 in Olifantsfontein, Ekurhuleni. She was found partially clothed and bruised, and her identity remains unknown. On 15 September 2026, a sixth body was discovered in Kwa-Thema, Springs; the victim also remains unidentified. As of 28 September 2026, twelve bodies have been found in total.

== Reactions ==
On 17 September, President Cyril Ramaphosa said that South Africa should not become accustomed to violence of this kind and stated that "no stone would be left unturned" in the investigations. A memorial event was held by Women for Change on 18 September, where the group criticised police advice that urged women to take extra precautions when exercising or walking alone. The organisation said: "Stop placing the responsibility of our safety back onto us". A memorial run took place in Johannesburg on 19 September in honour of Elizabeth Moselakgomo, where participants lit candles and carried a banner reading "Enough. Stop Femicide."
