= Fally Ipupa Foundation =

Congolese nonprofit organization

- French: Fondation Fally Ipupa
- Formation: June 2013; 13 years ago
- Founder: Fally Ipupa
- Founded at: Kinshasa
- Website: https://www.fallyipupafoundation.org/

The Fally Ipupa Foundation (French: Fondation Fally Ipupa; FFI) is a non-profit organization established in 2013 by Congolese singer-songwriter Fally Ipupa. It aims to provide assistance to various marginalized groups in need in the Democratic Republic of the Congo, including victims of sexual violence, diseases, as well as orphans.

== History and activities ==
=== Early work ===
Fally Ipupa founded the Fally Ipupa Foundation in June 2013, shortly after rehabilitating his former school, St. Jean-Baptiste in Kinshasa, and providing it with 100 equipped desks. Following its establishment, he then announced to Radio Okapi his strategy to procure funds for the foundation through concerts and other socio-cultural events. On 14 October 2014, the FFI dispatched a medical ambulance to the General Hospital of Goma. The foundation also distributed clothes and shoes to the victims embroiled in the Kivu conflicts in Goma. In October 2016, the Fally Ipupa Foundation launched the "Mayi Na Kisenso" initiative (denoting water for all) in Kinshasa to supply drinking water to the urban-rural commune of Kisenso. The project began on 6 October, with the planning of the roads and land where the water supply point was erected.

=== Later work ===
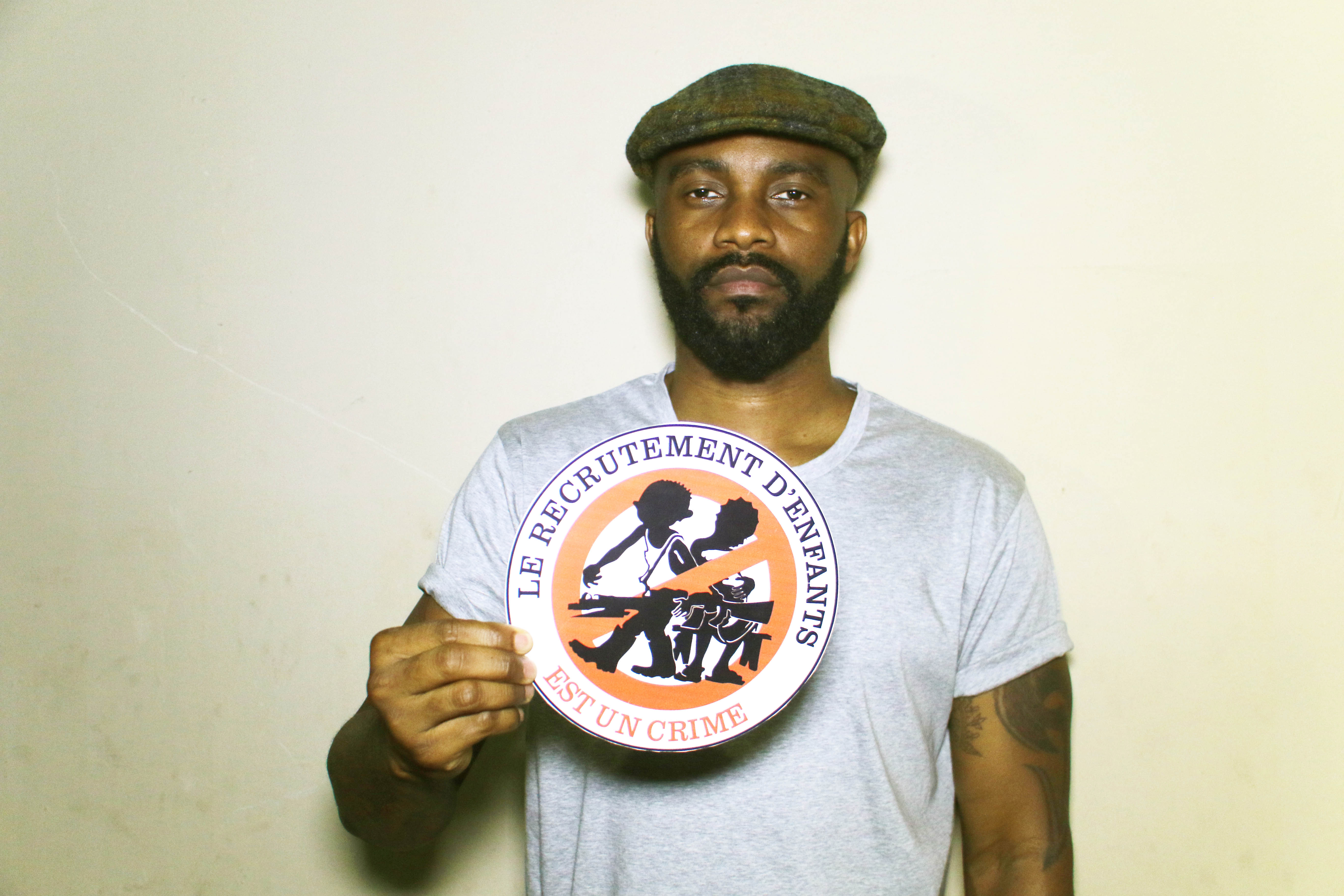
Fally Ipupa as part of the commemoration of the Day of the African Child with the aim of safeguarding children's protection during times of armed conflict, June 2018

In June 2018, during the resurgence of the Ebola epidemic in the eastern region of the DRC, the FFI launched a fundraising campaign and partnered with the humanitarian response led by the Congolese government and its health partners to help those in need. That same year during a 2018 tour to Lusaka, Zambia, Ipupa donated diapers, maize meal, methylated spirits, soap, and cotton wool, to the University Teaching Hospital's pediatric cancer and wards for disabled children.

During the COVID-19 pandemic, the foundation launched a fundraising campaign to help vulnerable and destitute people in the Democratic Republic of the Congo. Within a few days of its launch, the campaign collected over $10,000 in cash and tons of in-kind donations. The FFI also received a generous donation of 1,000 bags of rice. After the final collection, the FFI entrusted the Catholic Church with distributing all the donations collected, mainly through orphanages, homes for older adults, and other places. On 18 June 2020, the foundation presented a check for €20,000 and 2,500 anti-COVID masks to the Panzi Foundation of Congolese gynecologist Denis Mukwege through its clinic in Kinshasa.

On 17 May 2021, the FFI visited women giving birth at the Maternité de Kintambo hospital building located in Kintambo and the Centre Hospitalier de Référence Libikisi (formerly CBCO Hospital) in Bandalungwa, where it paid the hospital bills of about thirty mothers who had been unable to settle their expenses because of financial hardship.

Ipupa's first two consecutive concerts in Kampala, Uganda, in October 2023 at the Lugogo Cricket Oval, raised funds for the Children of Uganda NGO, a group that supports orphaned and at-risk children through education and job training programs. In August 2024, Ipupa visited a refugee camp situated 30 km from Goma that shelters people who had escaped the ongoing Rwandan-backed M23 assault in North Kivu. The foundation donated food, clothing, school supplies, and other necessary products, and oversaw the development of a school for the region's victims, with plans to name it after Y'a Nenet Anangi in honor of their friendship.

In June 2026, the FFI again settled the medical bills of 35 postpartum patients at the Centre Hospitalier de Référence Libikisi who remained hospitalized after giving birth due to a lack of funds. That same month, it also donated medical equipment along with gynecological and childcare supplies to N'djili General Hospital (Hôpital général de N'djili).
