= Buffelsfontein mine =

Gold Mine in South Africa

- Location within North West (South African province) Location within South Africa

Location
- Location: Stilfontein, North West, South Africa; 26.906°S 26.806°E

Production
- Products: Gold

History
- Closed: 2013

Owner
- Company: Simmer & Jack Mines

The Buffelsfontein mine was one of the largest gold mines in South Africa and in the world. The mine is located in the North West Province, south of Stilfontein and south-east of Klerksdorp. The mine had estimated reserves of 11.02 million oz of gold.

== Trapped miners incident ==
The mine ceased operations in 2013. After its closure, it became a site for illicit mining activity, with zama zamas attempting to extract remaining gold deposits in the abandoned shafts. In late 2024, hundreds of zama zamas became trapped in disused mine shafts at the mine after law enforcement blocked key exit shafts, trapping miners underground. Several dozen miners died of starvation and dehydration before their rescue in January 2025.
