= 2025 Table Mountain fire =

2025 wildfire in South Africa

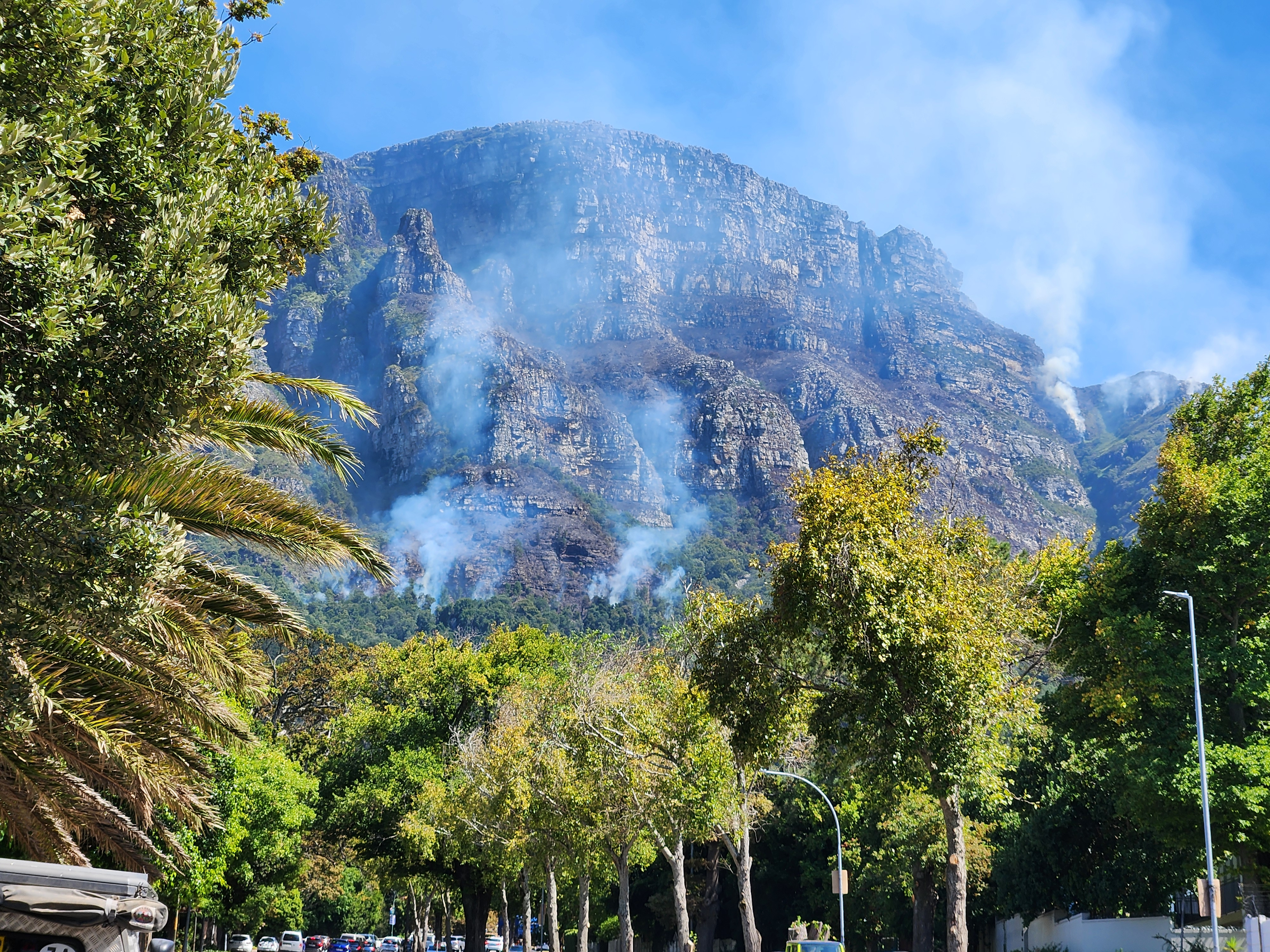
- The fire as seen from Newlands on 26 February 2025.
- Date: 23 February 2025; 16 months ago
- Location: Table Mountain National Park and Southern Suburbs, Cape Town, South Africa

Statistics
- Land use: National park

The 2025 Table Mountain fire was a large fire that started on the morning of 23 February 2025 in and around Table Mountain National Park and the neighbourhood of Newlands in Cape Town, South Africa. Starting in the Newlands Ravine area of the park and fueled by strong winds, the fire spread to the City Bowl side of Table Mountain by 26 February threatening the neighbourhood of Vredehoek. At least 60 hectares (148 acres) of the nature reserve was burnt in the first 24 hours. It was reported that 115 firefighters, four helicopters and two planes were used to combat the fire. A second fire in the Redhill region of the park was also active at the same time. The South African National Park Service reported that the fire was contained by 27 February 2025.

A second wildfire broke out in the area on 25 April, destroying five vehicles and 3,000 hectares (7,400 acres) of vegetation and prompting the evacuation of 200 residents. One person was arrested on suspicion of deliberately starting the fire.
