= Solly Moholo =

- Born: Solomon Majafela Molokoane; April 15, 1959; Soshanguve, Pretoria, South Africa
- Died: October 2, 2024 (aged 65) Gauteng, South Africa
- Genre: Gospel
- Occupations: Singer; songwriter
- Instrument: Vocals
- Years active: 2000–2024
- Labels: Sony Music Special Projects; Sound African Recordings
- Website: soundcloud.com/solly-moholo

Solomon Molokoane (April 10, 1959 – October 2, 2024), best known as Solly Moholo, was a South African gospel singer, and a member of the highly popular Zion Christian Church as a Christian singer. He rose to fame in the early 2000s following the release of his album Ba Mmitsa Tsotsi in 2001.

== Early life and career ==
Moholo was born and raised in the township of Soshanguve in Pretoria, Gauteng. He grew up in a religious and christian family and he deeply associated his musical career with attire similar to the one of ZCC and dance known as "Mokhuku". His musical career started in the early 2000.

== Notable incidents ==
According to reports, In 2009, four gunmen held Moholo and his two friends hostage at night in his home studio at Soshanguve, Pretoria demanding money, one of the gunman is said to have told the other three robbers to spare him life as he love his music.

== Death ==
Moholo passed away on October 2, 2024, while in hospital, aged 65. It was reported that he suffered from a stroke which is reported as the cause of his death. He was hospitalised shortly after he released his latest album, while preparing for tour in Botswana. His death was reported and spread all over South African social media and popular news including the SABC and eNCA. He was also a member of the ANC. He also received condolences from president Cyril Ramaphosa, the ANC secretary general Fikile Mbalula, Sony Music South Africa and Spotify Africa amongst other public figures.

== Discography ==
Studio albums

- Jesu Ba Mmitsa Tsotsi published by EMI Music Distribution
- Wubani O Zo Pepeza published by Sound African Recordings
- Oa Ntaela Moya published by Sony Music
- Sedi Laka Mpontshe Tsela by Sony Music
- Motlhang Ke Kolobetswa 'Die Poppe Sal Dans' by Sony Music
- Tsoha Jonase Nice Time Ya Bolaya by Sony Music
- Difofu Dikgopela Merapelo published by Sony Music
- Ba Mo Kobile Kerekeng published by EMI Music Distribution

== Awards and nominations ==
Year	Nominee / work	Award	Result	Ref.
2001	Best African Gospel Album		Nominated	
2009	Best African Traditional Gospel	South African Music Awards	Nominated	
2025	Legends Awards	Men of Influence Awards	Bestowed	
