= Cleveland, Gauteng =

Cleveland
- Location within Gauteng Location within South Africa
- Coordinates: 26°12′27″S 28°06′46″E
- Country: South Africa
- Province: Gauteng
- Municipality: City of Johannesburg
- Main Place: Johannesburg
- Established: 1903

Area
  - Total: 0.77 km^{2} (0.30 sq mi)

Population (2011)
  - Total: 2,341
  - Density: 3,000/km^{2} (7,900/sq mi)

Racial makeup (2011)
  - Black African: 97.39%
  - Coloured: 1.58%
  - Indian/Asian: 0.09%
  - White: 0.85%
  - Other: 0.04%

First languages (2011)
  - Zulu: 54.10%
  - Xhosa: 9.93%
  - Tsonga: 5.98%
  - Sotho: 6.73%
  - Other: 23.26%
- Time zone: UTC+2 (SAST)
- Postal code (street): 2094
- PO box: 2022

Cleveland is a suburb of Johannesburg, South Africa. It is now a light industrial suburb. It is located in Region F of the City of Johannesburg Metropolitan Municipality.

== History ==
The suburb is situated on part of an old Witwatersrand farm called Doornfontein. It was established in 1903 and was named after Cleveland, Ohio. The suburb was the location for storage of mining equipment by American firms.

In June 2026, twelve people died in a mass shooting in Jumpers, an informal village in Cleveland.
