= Vanderbijlpark scholar transport crash =

2026 road incident in Gauteng, South Africa

Details
- Date: 19 January 2026; 07:00
- Location: Vanderbijlpark, Gauteng
- Coordinates: 26°38′57.8″S 27°48′12.6″E
- Country: South Africa

Statistics
- Deaths: 14
- Injured: 3

On the morning of 19 January 2026, a private scholar transport minibus collided with a truck near Vanderbijlpark, Gauteng, South Africa, killing 14 schoolchildren and leaving two children and a driver injured.

== Background ==
The crash happened near Vanderbijlpark in the Vaal region of Gauteng Province, south of Johannesburg. The stretch of road where the collision occurred is known for heavy commuter traffic and has seen calls from road safety advocates for improved infrastructure and law enforcement due to frequent accidents.

Between 2018 and 2022, over 800 students died in traffic accidents involving scholar transport vehicles, making traffic-related injuries one of the leading causes of deaths for children in South Africa.

Concerns had previously been raised after high-profile school bus accidents. On 16 September 2022, a delivery truck collided head-on with a bakkie transporting students in Pongola, killing 18 students, a teacher and the bakkie driver. On 10 July 2024, a private scholar bus overturned and caught fire after being rear-ended by another car in Carletonville, killing eleven students and the bus driver.

== Event ==
The collision occurred at around 7 a.m. on Fred Droste Road (R553), a busy route used by many learners to commute to schools in the Vanderbijlpark and Vaal area. Preliminary reports from police and traffic officials indicate that the scholar transport vehicle, a minibus taxi carrying pupils from several schools, attempted to overtake multiple vehicles when it collided head-on with a side tipper truck.

Emergency services pronounced 11 students dead at the site. Two more students succumbed to injuries in hospital, bringing the total death toll to 13. Several pupils, along with the driver of the minibus, were taken to local medical facilities with critical injuries.

== Reactions ==
Senior officials, including Gauteng Premier Panyaza Lesufi and Education MEC Matome Chiloane, visited the crash scene to support mourning families and coordinate emergency response efforts. They described the crash as a “tragic day” for the province and extended condolences to the victim's families, schools, and broader community.

The Democratic Alliance (DA) and other political organisations have also expressed deep sorrow and urged stronger regulation and enforcement of transport safety standards to prevent future tragedies.

After the crash, traffic authorities made more checks on vehicles. On 21 January, a motorist fled from police after it was found that he had overloaded a seven-seater minibus with 22 children. On 22 January, 60 minibus taxis were impounded for various traffic violations, including invalid permits, overloading and reckless driving.

== Investigation ==
Police have arrested and opened a culpable homicide investigation against Ayanda Dludla, a 22-year-old taxi driver, as part of ongoing efforts to determine the full circumstances leading to the collision. On 22 January 2026, Ayanda Dludla was charged at Vanderbijlpark Magistrate's Court with 14 counts of murder, 3 counts of attempted murder, reckless and negligence driving, driving an unroadworthy car, and driving without a permit. As of April 2026, he has been held without bail at Vereeniging Prison. Requests for release on bail have been repeatedly denied and previous dates for hearing, with decision for a trial date set for 13 May 2026.

== Safety and accountability ==
Following the collision, there have been renewed calls from civil society and political groups for stricter oversight of scholar transport vehicles, greater enforcement of roadworthiness standards, and rigorous compliance checks for operators. Some parties have emphasised that ensuring vehicles are not overloaded and drivers are properly trained and regulated is essential to prevent similar accidents.

Preliminary reports indicate that both the driver and the vehicle were not licensed.
