= Tersia Marshall =

South African politician and attorney (1980–2026)

Member of the Mpumalanga Provincial Legislature
- In office 14 June 2024 – 16 July 2026

Personal details
- Born: 14 September 1980
- Died: 16 July 2026 (aged 45) Rustenburg, North West Province, South Africa
- Party: Democratic Alliance (2015–2026)
- Profession: Politician, attorney

Tersia Marshall (14 September 1980 – 16 July 2026) was a South African politician and attorney who represented the Democratic Alliance in the Mpumalanga Provincial Legislature from 2024 until her death. She had previously served as a councillor in the Mbombela Local Municipality.

== Career ==
Marshall was a practising attorney. In 2015, she joined the Democratic Alliance. She was elected as a ward councillor in the Mbombela Local Municipality in the 2016 municipal election. In 2020, Marshall planned to establish her own legal practice, but the COVID-19 pandemic and subsequent lockdown forced her to postpone those plans. During the early months of the pandemic, she distributed food to residents in her constituency. In July 2020, News24 described her as an "everyday hero" for her efforts. Marshall was elected the party's provincial disciplinary chairperson at the party's provincial congress held in October 2020. She stood down as a ward councillor at the 2021 local election and was instead elected back to council via the party list.

After the Mbombela municipality's planned study tour to Kenya with the mayor and the municipal manager went ahead in May 2023, Marshall argued that "not one" of the feedback reports from past overseas study tours had "showed any benefit to the residents of the municipality."

She was elected to the Mpumalanga Provincial Legislature in the 2024 provincial election as the DA won six seats. As the party's spokesperson on Agriculture, Rural Development, Land and Environmental Affairs, she called on the Hawks to thoroughly investigate the alleged misuse of public funds at the provincial department after the agency launched a corruption probe in February 2025.

In May 2026, Marshall alleged that generations of residents in Bushbuckridge continue to suffer under what she described as 'systemic neglect' while referring to unemployment, corruption and poor governance in the municipality.

== Personal life and death ==
Marshall was married to a farmer.

On 15 July 2026, Marshall was involved in a car collision in Rustenburg in the North West Province. She was transferred to Ferncrest Hospital, where she died from her injuries the following day. The DA paid tribute to Marshall, writing that "she will be remembered for her dedicated service and contribution to the people of Mpumalanga."
