= Edward Ntshingila =

South African politician (died 2026)

Edward Ntshingila MP

Member of the National Assembly of South Africa
- In office 25 June 2024 – 4 June 2026

Personal details
- Born: Edward Mzikayise Ntshingila
- Died: 4 June 2026
- Party: uMkhonto weSizwe Party
- Profession: Politician

Edward Mzikayise Ntshingila (died 4 June 2026) was a South African politician who was a Member of Parliament in the National Assembly of South Africa for the uMkhonto weSizwe Party.

== Life and career ==
Ntshingila stood as parliamentary candidate for the uMkhonto weSizwe Party in the 2024 general election and was elected to the National Assembly of South Africa and sworn into office on 25 June 2024.

Following his swearing-in, he was appointed a party whip in July 2024. He was appointed to the Joint Standing Committee on Defence in October 2024.

After 14 South African National Defence Force soldiers were killed fighting M23 rebels in the Democratic Republic of Congo in January 2025, Ntshingila said that MK party president Jacob Zuma managed SANDF's deployment in the DRC better during his tenure as president of South Africa.

In July 2025, Ntshingila rejected the Department of Trade, Industry and Competition's proposed budget for 2025/2026, arguing that "it sustains exclusion, reproduces poverty and abdicates responsibility for transformation."

During the debate on a proposal to establish an ad hoc committee to investigate statues and memorials associated with South Africa's pre-1994 white minority government in September 2025, Ntshingila supported the draft resolution and proposed that celebrations accompany the removal of symbols linked to the white minority-rule period.

Ntshingila died on 4 June 2026, aged 43.

=== Committee assignments ===
- National Assembly Rules Committee
- Joint Standing Committee on Defence
- Joint Standing Committee on Intelligence
- Portfolio Committee on Trade, Industry and Competition
- Joint Ad hoc Mediation Committee (National Gambling Amendment Bill) (former)
- Portfolio Committee on Defence and Military Veterans (former)
