= Women For Change =

South African civil society organisation

- Abbreviation: WFC
- Formation: 2016; 10 years ago
- Founder: Sabrina Walter
- Type: Nonprofit • Advocacy group
- Registration no.: 219-909
- Purpose: Combating gender-based violence and femicide
- Region served: South Africa
- Revenue: ▲ R 340,968 (2024)
- Funding: Donations • Fundraising
- Website: womenforchange.co.za

Women For Change (often abbreviated WFC) is a South African civil society organisation and advocacy movement focused on combating gender-based violence and femicide through public mobilisation, petitions, and protest campaigns. The organisation played a prominent role in organising nationwide actions and petitions that drew widespread media attention during 2025 calling for government recognition of GBVF as a national disaster.

== History and background ==
In 2016, Women For Change was founded by Sabrina Walter. The organisation made use of social media and grassroots mobilisation to highlight high levels of violence against women and children and to encourage public engagement on the issue. By 2025, Women For Change had gained significant national prominence, with its campaigns attracting extensive local and international media coverage.

== Campaigns ==
=== Petition to declare GBVF a national disaster ===
In 2025, WFC launched a major petition campaign on Change.org urging the South African government to declare gender-based violence and femicide a national disaster. The petition amassed to over a million signatures.

=== G20 Women's shutdown and protests ===
In November 2025, ahead of the G20 Summit hosted in Johannesburg, Women For Change organised a nationwide campaign called the G20 Women's Shutdown, urging women and allies to withdraw from paid and unpaid work for a day to demonstrate the economic and social impact of violence against women. Protesters wore symbolic colours and participated in lie-down demonstrations to highlight the human toll of GBVF.

Following these and further campaigns, along with public pressure, the president of South Africa, Cyril Ramaphosa, officially classified gender-based violence and femicide as a national disaster on 21 November 2025, with Minister of Cooperative Governance and Traditional Affairs, Velenkosini Hlabisa, welcoming the decision.

Women For Change publicly celebrated this outcome on social platforms, framing it as a victory for activists and survivors.
