= Politics of South Africa =

- Coat of arms of South Africa
- Polity type: Unitary parliamentary republic with an executive presidency
- Constitution: Constitution of South Africa

Legislative branch
- Name: Parliament
- Meeting place: Houses of Parliament, Cape Town
- Upper house
- Name: National Council of Provinces
- Presiding officer: Refilwe Mtsweni-Tsipane, Chairperson of the National Council of Provinces
- Appointer: Provincial legislatures
- Lower house
- Name: National Assembly
- Presiding officer: Thoko Didiza, Speaker of the National Assembly
- Appointer: National Assembly

Executive branch
- Head of state and government
- Title: President
- Currently: Cyril Ramaphosa
- Appointer: National Assembly
- Cabinet
- Name: Cabinet of South Africa
- Current cabinet: Third Cabinet of Cyril Ramaphosa
- Leader: President
- Deputy leader: Deputy President
- Appointer: President
- Ministries: 32

Judicial branch
- Name: Judiciary of South Africa
- Constitutional Court
- Chief judge: Mandisa Maya
- Supreme Court of Appeal
- Chief judge: Mahube Molemela

The Republic of South Africa is a unitary parliamentary democratic republic. The President of South Africa serves both as head of state and as head of government. The president is elected by the National Assembly (the lower house of the South African Parliament) and must retain the confidence of the Assembly in order to remain in office. South Africans also elect provincial legislatures which govern each of the country's nine provinces.

Since the end of apartheid in 1994, the African National Congress (ANC) has dominated South Africa's politics. The ANC is the ruling party in the national legislature, as well as in most provinces, and is led by Cyril Ramaphosa, who serves as the President of South Africa. In recent years, however, the ANC's share of the vote has decreased significantly. The party received 40.18% of the vote during the 2024 general election - the first time the ANC did not win a Parliamentary majority in the history of democratic South Africa.

The second largest party and traditionally the main opposition to the ANC is the Democratic Alliance (DA), led by Geordin Hill-Lewis, who also serves as the Mayor of Cape Town. The DA has seen its share of the vote increase in recent years, and the party received 21.81% of the vote in the 2024 election. It is currently a member of the multi-party coalition Government of National Unity, and holds various Ministries.

Other major political parties represented in Parliament include uMkhonto we Sizwe (MKP), which serves as the Official Opposition, the Economic Freedom Fighters (EFF), and the Inkatha Freedom Party (IFP).

The formerly dominant New National Party (NNP), which both introduced and ended apartheid through its predecessor, the National Party (NP), disbanded in 2005 to merge with the ANC.

Nelson Mandela served as president from 1994 to 1999, and his successors were Thabo Mbeki (1999−2008), Kgalema Motlanthe (2008−2009) and Jacob Zuma (2009−2018). Zuma was replaced by Cyril Ramaphosa after the former's resignation in February 2018.

The most recent general election was held on 29 May 2024, and resulted in a coalition government - the first of its kind since 1994. Despite losing the majority in 2024, the ANC managed to retain power with a coalition government. The next elections in South Africa are the 2026 municipal elections, wherein voters will elect local government officials. The elections are scheduled to take place on 4 November.

South Africa is a democracy. Universal suffrage was granted in 1994 with the end of apartheid. Since then, elections have been open and competitive, and the lives of South Africans have improved across multiple metrics. However, it has faced challenges as a multi-racial, young democracy. The Economist Intelligence Unit rated South Africa a "flawed democracy" in 2022. It is a joint-second-most electorally democratic (alongside Mauritius and Cabo Verde) and a joint-third-most liberally democratic African nation (alongside Cabo Verde), as well as the most electorally and liberally democratic mainland African nation, according to the V-Dem Institute.

== Context ==
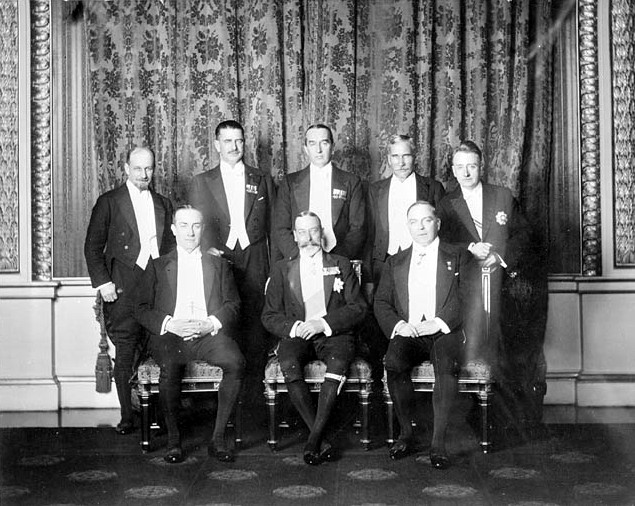
The Prime Ministers of the British Dominions attending the 1926 Imperial Conference with King George V seated in the center.

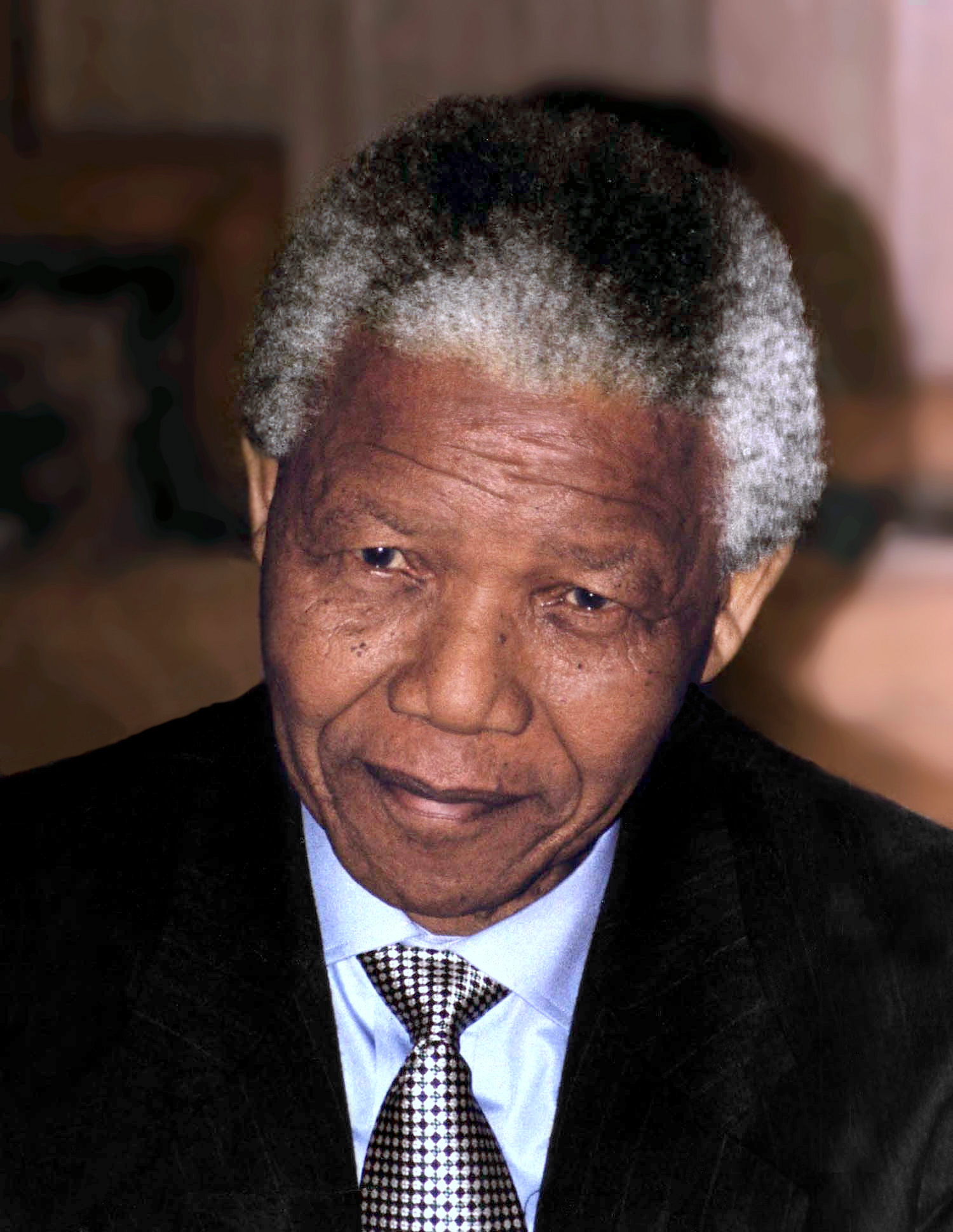
Nelson Mandela was the first democratically elected President of South Africa.

On 31 May 1910, the Cape Colony, Natal Colony, Transvaal and the Orange River Colony were united in one state called the Union of South Africa. The Union of South Africa adopted a system of governance based on the political system of the United Kingdom. The British monarch was the ceremonial head of state of South Africa and was represented by a Governor-General. Real political power lay in the hands of the Prime Minister and Cabinet. The basic ideas of this system such as a three branch government and strong Parliament remain in force today.

On 15 November 1926, the Balfour Declaration was adopted at the 1926 Imperial Conference. This document made the dominions of the British Empire including South Africa equal to each other and the United Kingdom. In practice, this made the Union of South Africa a self-governing dominion of the British Empire. The Union of South Africa became formally independent in 1931 when the Statute of Westminster was passed. It gave the Parliament of South Africa the power to make laws for South Africa without the approval of the Parliament of the United Kingdom.

In 1948, the National Party of South Africa adopted a policy of institutional racial segregation called apartheid. People of colour, especially the majority black population, were deprived of the few rights they had. Racial classification and discrimination was used to distribute economic resources and control political power. The white population, particularly the Afrikaners, controlled the political system. Black people were disenfranchised in all provinces of South Africa.

In 1961, South Africa became a Republic. The British monarch was replaced as head of state by a president elected by the minority of the population through elected representatives. In 1970, the Homeland Citizens Act was passed. It built on the system of reservations for the indigenous black African population to create a system of superficially independent black countries. Many Black people were deprived of their South African citizenship and instead became citizens of the Bantustan of their tribe. They were not recognized by a majority of the world's countries and the extent of their independent control over internal affairs was highly limited.

The African National Congress (ANC) led the fight against this system of apartheid. After intense international pressure and domestic struggle, the De Klerk government repealed or relaxed many apartheid laws. After negotiations between the ANC, Inkatha Freedom Party, NP and other organizations, apartheid was formally abolished and the Interim Constitution was passed. The Bantustans were abolished and reintegrated into South Africa and their citizens regained South African citizenship.

The Government of National Unity (GNU) established under the interim constitution ostensibly remained in effect until the 1999 national elections. The parties originally comprising the GNU – the African National Congress (ANC), the National Party (NP), and the Inkatha Freedom Party (IFP) – shared executive power. On 30 June 1996, the NP withdrew from the GNU to become part of the opposition.

Many of the principles of racial equality, majority democracy and minority rights that it established were translated into the final Constitution of South Africa that was adopted in 1996 and which remains in force. It sets out the structure of the government, protects fundamental human rights, creates mechanisms of accountability and divides legislative and executive power among the national, provincial and local spheres of government.

In the 2024 general election, the ANC lost its majority in Parliament for the first time in SA's democratic history. As a result of subsequent negotiations, a multi-party coalition was formed. This was the country's first Government of National Unity (GNU) since 1994. The GNU had 4 founding members, and a further three joined later. All seven were represented in the Third Cabinet of Cyril Ramaphosa, being appointed various Ministerial positions. Two additional parties are represented by Deputy Ministers, and a further one party participates in the coalition but is not represented in the Cabinet. This makes for a total of 10 members, as of 2026.

Afrobarometer opinion polls found the main issues as of 2026 were unemployment, crime, infrastructure, and corruption, resulting in rising democratic dissatisfaction.

== Government ==
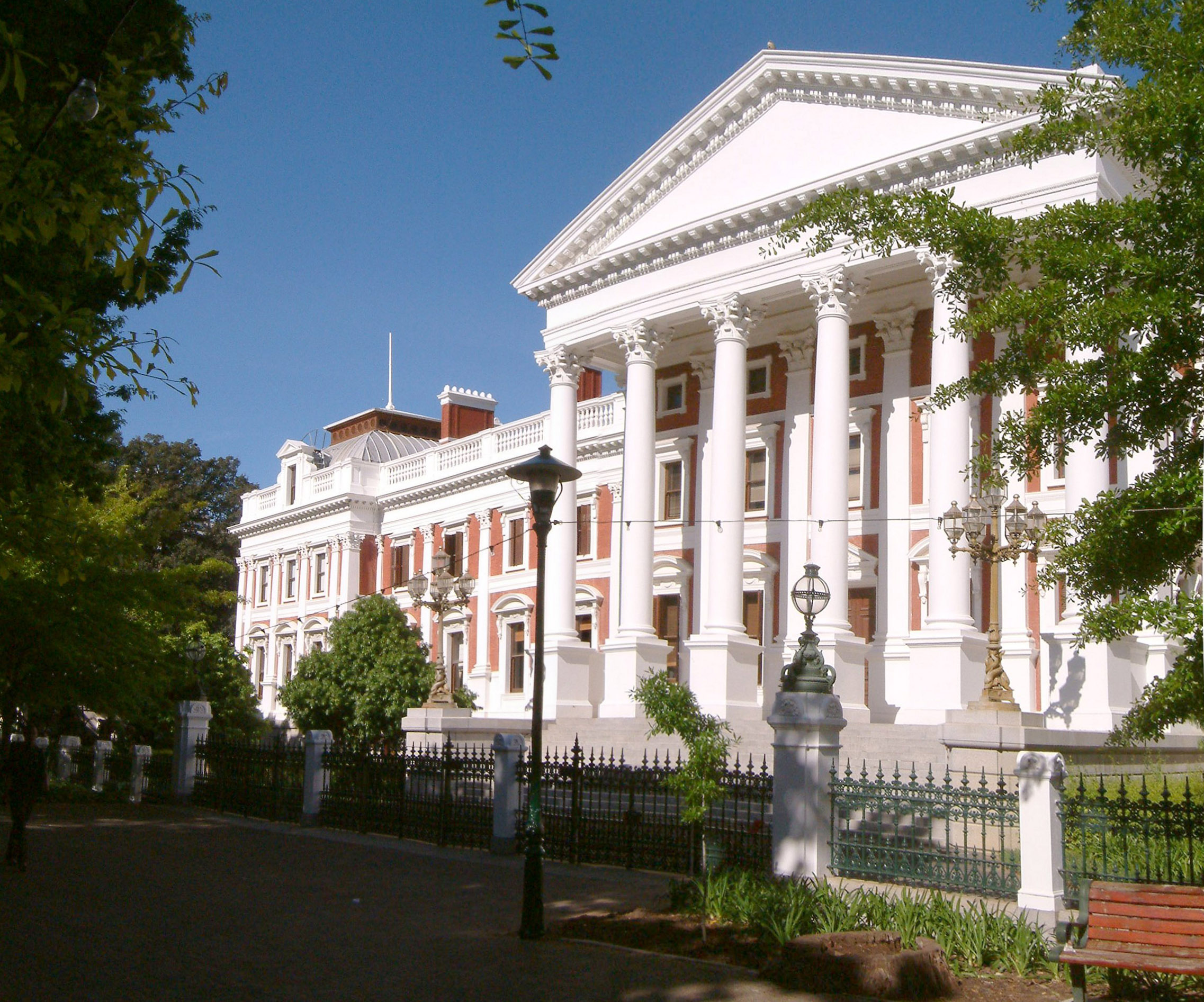
The Houses of Parliament in the legislative capital of Cape Town is the seat of the Parliament.

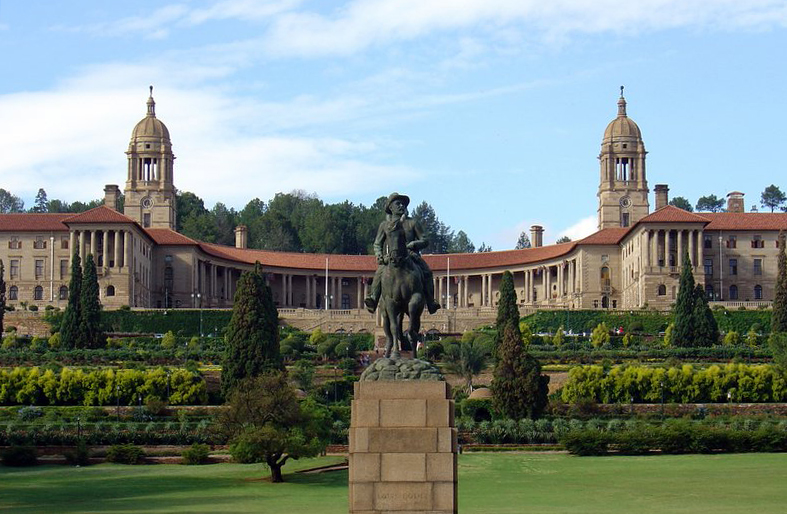
The Union Buildings in the administrative capital of Pretoria.

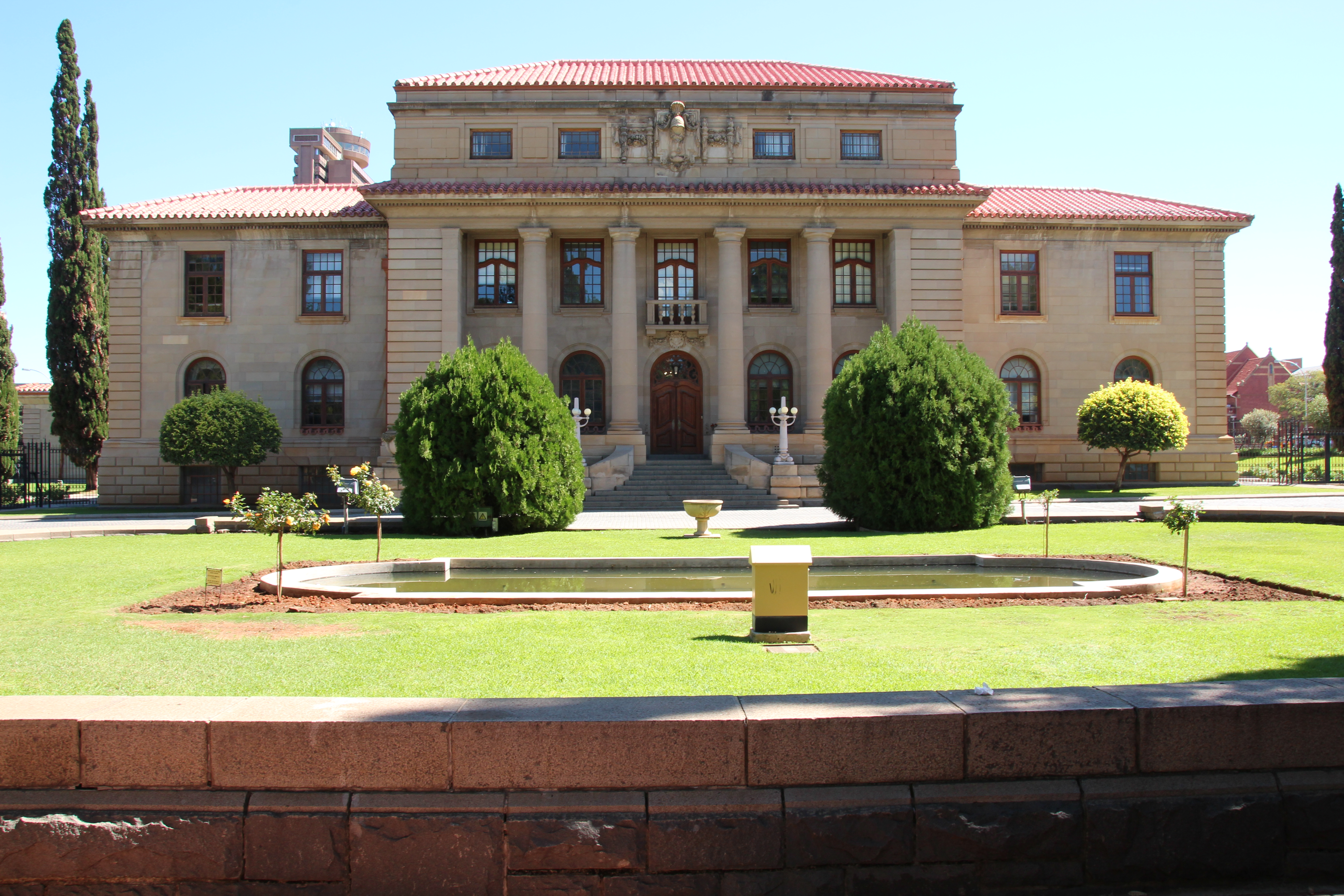
The seat of the Supreme Court of Appeals is located in the judicial capital of Bloemfontein.

South Africa is a parliamentary representative democratic republic, wherein the President of South Africa, elected by parliament, is the head of government, and of a multi-party system. It consists of three branches.

The executive branch consists of the president of South Africa and the Cabinet of South Africa. The president is elected by the Parliament of South Africa for a five-year term. The president may only serve two terms. By convention this position is occupied by the leader of the largest party in the National Assembly. The president appoints other members of the Cabinet called ministers. Ministers oversee executive government departments. The Cabinet forms and executes policies and most legislative proposals originate from the Cabinet.

The president and members of the Cabinet are accountable to the National Assembly. It has the power to remove them from office by passing a motion of no confidence and to hold them accountable through oral and written replies to questions from Members of Parliament.

The legislative branch consists of the Parliament of South Africa, wherein democratically elected Members of Parliament (MPs) represent their constituents. Parliament consists of two chambers with distinct responsibilities, which have a combined seat total of 490.

The larger, lower house is the National Assembly, which consists of 400 MPs, and is in practice the significantly more powerful of the two houses. It controls the composition of the government and its approval is required for most legislative proposals to become law. The National Assembly is elected by party proportional representation.

The upper house is the National Council of Provinces (NCOP), which consists of 90 MPs. It provides equal representation to South Africa's nine provinces, and its approval is required for laws that affect South Africa's provinces and cultural communities. The NCOP is elected by the legislatures of each province.

The judicial branch consists of the courts. It interprets and enforces laws. The highest court for constitutional matters is the Constitutional Court of South Africa. It has the power to rescind laws that conflict with the Constitution. The Supreme Court of Appeals is the highest court for non-constitutional matters. The High Court of South Africa is a court of general jurisdiction with appellate powers. It is divided into divisions that have authority over a geographic region of the country. Magistrate Courts serve as courts of first instance. There are specialized courts and tribunals with power that can be equivalent to the Supreme Court of Appeals.

== Constitution ==
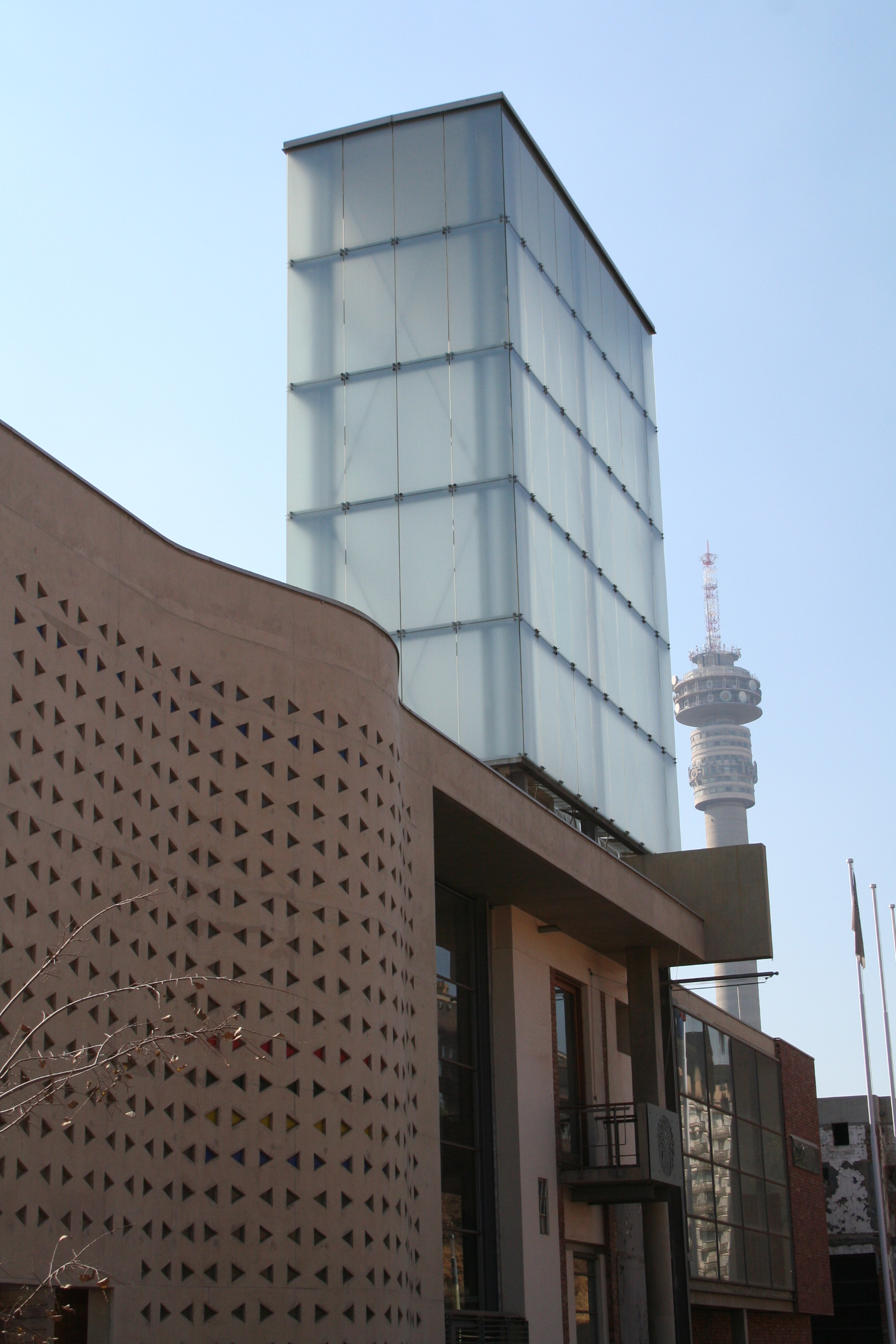
The Constitutional Court is seated in Johannesburg on Constitution Hill. It is the final arbiter of the constitution and its decisions are binding on all courts in the Republic

Following the 1994 elections, South Africa was governed under an interim constitution. This constitution required the Constituent Assembly (CA) to draft and approve a permanent constitution by 9 May 1996. The present constitution was passed in 1996 and promulgated by President Nelson Mandela in 1997. It is the highest law in the land; all other laws are expected to abide by and conform to the principles of the constitution. The Constitution not only sets out the structure of the three branches of government and the fundamental human rights of all of South Africa's people, but also provides for the management of public funding, the delineation of the boundaries and organization of Provinces and the formation of Chapter 9 Institutions to hold the government accountable.

== Political parties and their current vote share ==
General elections take place every 5 years. The first fully non-racial democratic election was held in 1994. Subsequent elections were held in 1999, 2004, 2009, 2014, 2019, and 2024. Until 2008, elected officials were allowed to change political party, while retaining their seats, during set windows which occurred twice each electoral term, due to controversial floor crossing legislative amendments made in 2002. The last two floor crossing windows occurred in 2005 and in 2007.

After the 2009 elections, the ANC lost its two-thirds majority in the national legislature which had allowed it to unilaterally alter the constitution.

The Congress of South African Trade Unions (COSATU) and the South African Communist Party (SACP) are in a formal alliance with the ruling ANC (the so-called Tripartite Alliance), and thus do not stand separately for election.

During the 2024 general election, the ANC lost its majority in the national parliament for the first time in South Africa's democratic history, though it still remained the largest political party. As a result, a multi-party coalition Government of National Unity (GNU) formed. It had four founding members, and has 10 in total, as of 2026.

Party	National ballot				Regional ballot				Total seats	+/–
Party	Votes	%	+/–	Seats	Votes	%	+/–	Seats	Total seats	+/–
African National Congress	6,459,683	40.18	–17.32	73	6,231,519	39.38	—	86	159	–71
Democratic Alliance	3,505,735	21.81	+1.04	42	3,439,272	21.74	—	45	87	+3
uMkhonto weSizwe	2,344,309	14.58	New	31	2,237,877	14.14	—	27	58	New
Economic Freedom Fighters	1,529,961	9.52	–1.28	17	1,556,965	9.84	—	22	39	–5
Inkatha Freedom Party	618,207	3.85	+0.47	8	688,570	4.35	—	9	17	+3
Patriotic Alliance	330,425	2.06	+2.02	5	345,880	2.19	—	4	9	+9
Freedom Front Plus	218,850	1.36	–1.02	4	234,477	1.48	—	2	6	–4
ActionSA	192,373	1.20	New	4	219,477	1.39	—	2	6	New
African Christian Democratic Party	96,575	0.60	–0.24	3	93,581	0.59	—	0	3	–1
United Democratic Movement	78,448	0.49	+0.04	2	85,618	0.54	—	1	3	+1
Rise Mzansi	67,975	0.42	New	1	70,142	0.44	—	1	2	New
Build One South Africa	65,912	0.41	New	2	69,020	0.44	—	0	2	New
African Transformation Movement	63,554	0.40	–0.04	2	66,831	0.42	—	0	2	0
Al Jama-ah	39,067	0.24	+0.06	2	53,337	0.34	—	0	2	+1
National Coloured Congress	37,422	0.23	New	1	47,178	0.30	—	1	2	New
Pan Africanist Congress of Azania	36,716	0.23	+0.04	1	40,788	0.26	—	0	1	0
United Africans Transformation	35,679	0.22	New	1	32,185	0.20	—	0	1	New
Good	29,501	0.18	–0.22	1	36,103	0.23	—	0	1	–1
#Hope4SA	27,206	0.17	New	0	16,872	0.11	—	0	0	New
Allied Movement for Change	22,055	0.14	New	0	18,393	0.12	—	0	0	New
United Independent Movement	20,003	0.12	New	0	18,907	0.12	—	0	0	New
African Independent Congress	19,900	0.12	–0.16	0	3,833	0.02	—	0	0	–2
National Freedom Party	19,397	0.12	–0.23	0	22,726	0.14	—	0	0	–2
Azanian People's Organisation	19,048	0.12	+0.05	0	18,741	0.12	—	0	0	0
African Congress for Transformation	18,354	0.11	New	0	348	0.00	—	0	0	New
African Heart Congress	16,306	0.10	New	0	3,579	0.02	—	0	0	New
Congress of the People	14,177	0.09	–0.18	0	16,768	0.11	—	0	0	–2
African People's Convention	13,195	0.08	–0.03	0	14,693	0.09	—	0	0	0
Africa Restoration Alliance	11,108	0.07	New	0	12,651	0.08	—	0	0	New
Forum for Service Delivery	11,077	0.07	+0.03	0	7,444	0.05	—	0	0	0
Democratic Liberal Congress	10,904	0.07	+0.01	0	7,022	0.04	—	0	0	0
Alliance of Citizens for Change	9,336	0.06	New	0	11,217	0.07	—	0	0	New
Action Alliance Development Party	7,802	0.05	New	0	4,600	0.03	—	0	0	New
Conservatives in Action	7,424	0.05	New	0	1,115	0.01	—	0	0	New
South African Royal Kingdoms Organisation	6,685	0.04	New	0	3,195	0.02	—	0	0	New
Northern Cape Communities Movement	6,629	0.04	New	0	7,016	0.04	—	0	0	New
People's Movement for Change	5,539	0.03	New	0	7,045	0.04	—	0	0	New
Abantu Batho Congress	5,531	0.03	New	0	3,552	0.02	—	0	0	New
Economic Liberators Forum	5,408	0.03	New	0	7,115	0.04	—	0	0	New
Organic Humanity Movement	5,241	0.03	New	0	6,457	0.04	—	0	0	New
African Content Movement	5,107	0.03	0.00	0	4,617	0.03	—	0	0	0
Sizwe Ummah Nation	5,016	0.03	New	0	4,869	0.03	—	0	0	New
South African Rainbow Alliance	4,796	0.03	New	0	7,645	0.05	—	0	0	New
African People's Movement	4,601	0.03	New	0	4,200	0.03	—	0	0	New
Able Leadership	3,867	0.02	New	0	3,161	0.02	—	0	0	New
Referendum Party	3,834	0.02	New	0	4,206	0.03	—	0	0	New
All Citizens Party	3,693	0.02	New	0	1,644	0.01	—	0	0	New
Africa Africans Reclaim	3,371	0.02	New	0	2,565	0.02	—	0	0	New
Citizans	2,992	0.02	New	0	4,084	0.03	—	0	0	New
Xiluva	2,592	0.02	New	0	1,167	0.01	—	0	0	New
African Movement Congress	2,141	0.01	New	0	1,550	0.01	—	0	0	New
Free Democrats	1,992	0.01	0.00	0	2,276	0.01	—	0	0	0
Independents					19,304	0.12		0	0	New
Total	16,076,719	100.00	–	200	15,823,397	100.00	–	200	400	0
Valid votes	16,076,719	98.69			15,823,397	99.02				
Invalid/blank votes	213,437	1.31			156,834	0.98				
Total votes	16,290,156	100.00			15,980,231	100.00				
Registered voters/turnout	27,782,081	58.64			27,782,081	57.52				
Source: Electoral Commission of South Africa, IOL

== Party Vote by region ==
The ANC's performance by region in the 2024 South African general election.

The Democratic Alliance (South Africa) performance by region in the 2024 South African general election.

The uMkhonto we Sizwe (political party) performance by region.

The Economic Freedom Fighters performance by region in the 2024 South African general election.

The ANC's seat loss by region and national ballot in the 2024 election.

== Human rights ==
The constitution's bill of rights provides extensive guarantees, including equality before the law and prohibitions against discrimination; the right to life, privacy, property, and freedom and security of the person; prohibition against slavery and forced labour; and freedom of speech, religion, assembly, and association. The legal rights of criminal suspects also are enumerated. It also includes wide guarantees of access of food, water, education, health care, and social security. The constitution provides for an independent and impartial judiciary, and, in practice, these provisions are respected.

Citizens' entitlements to a safe environment, housing, education and health care are included in the Bill of Rights, and are known as secondary constitutional rights. In 2003 the constitutional secondary rights were used by the Treatment Action Campaign, a HIV/AIDS activist group as a means of forcing the government to change its health policy.

Violent crime, including violence against women and children, and organised criminal activity are at high levels and are a grave concern. Partly as a result, vigilante action and mob justice sometimes occur. Some South African politicians were inciting violence based on race or political affiliation according to South Africa's Equality Court.

Some members of the police are accused of applying excessive force and abusing suspects in custody; as a result, the number of deaths in police custody remains a problem. In April 1997, the government established an Independent Complaints Directorate to investigate deaths in police custody and deaths resulting from police action.

Some discrimination against women continues, although it has improved overall, and discrimination against those living with HIV/AIDS has been becoming a serious issue.

There has been a growing political intolerance and repression, especially with regard to grassroots activists.

== Notable politicians ==
Mangosuthu Buthelezi was chief minister of his Kwa-Zulu homeland from 1976 until 1994. In post-apartheid South Africa he has served as President of the Inkatha Freedom Party. He was a Minister in President Mandela's cabinet. He also served as acting President of South Africa when President Nelson Mandela was overseas.

Bantubonke Holomisa, who was a general in the homeland of Transkei from 1987, has served as the president of the United Democratic Movement since 1997. Today he is a Member of Parliament.

General Constand Viljoen was a former chief of the South African Defence Force, who, as a leader of the Afrikaner Volksfront, sent 1500 of his militiamen to prop up the government of Lucas Mangope and to contest the termination of Bophuthatswana as a homeland in 1994. He co-founded the Freedom Front in 1994. He retired from being a Member of Parliament before his death in 2020.

Lucas Mangope, former chief of the Motsweda Ba hurutshe-Boo-Manyane tribe of the Tswana, ex-president of the former bantustan of Bophuthatswana, was the leader of the United Christian Democratic Party.

== See also ==
- Internet censorship in South Africa
- Hate speech laws in South Africa

== Bibliography ==
- South Africa. The Constitution of the Republic of South Africa, 1996. Available at https://www.gov.za/documents/constitution-republic-south-africa-1996.
- United Kingdom. South Africa Act, 1909. Available at https://media.law.wisc.edu/s/c_8/jzhy2/cbsa1.pdf
- United Kingdom. Statute of Westminster, 1931. Available at https://www.legislation.gov.uk/ukpga/1931/4/pdfs/ukpga_19310004_en.pdf
- United Kingdom. Balfour Declaration, 1926.
- South Africa. Bantu Homeland Citizenship Act, 1970. Available at http://disa.ukzn.ac.za/leg19700309028020026
- South Africa. Constitution of South Africa, Act 200 of 1993. Available at https://www.gov.za/documents/constitution/constitution-republic-south-africa-act-200-1993
- South Africa. Status of the Union, Act 69 of 1934.
