= Cathlene Labuschagne =

South African politician

Cathlene Labuschagne MP
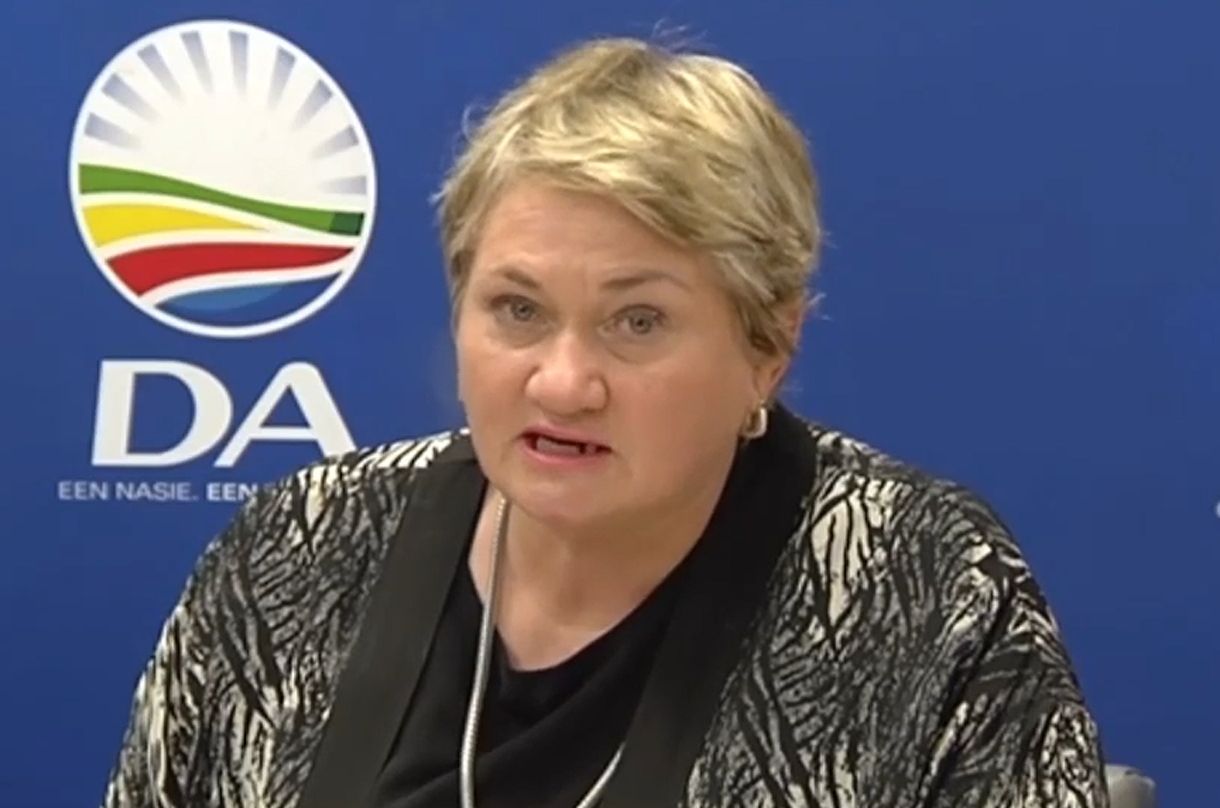

Leader of the Opposition in the National Council of Provinces
- Incumbent
- Assumed office 19 September 2016
- Preceded by: Elza van Lingen

Permanent delegate to the National Council of the Provinces from the Western Cape
- Incumbent
- Assumed office 22 May 2014

Member of the Western Cape Provincial Parliament
- In office 6 May 2009 – 6 May 2014
- Constituency: City of Cape Town

Personal details
- Party: Democratic Alliance
- Profession: Politician

Cathlene Labuschagne is a South African politician serving as a permanent delegate to the National Council of the Provinces from the Western Cape since 2014. Labuschagne is a party member of the Democratic Alliance.

== Life and career ==
Labuschagne was born in Durbanville in the former Cape Province. She moved to Namibia and completed her high school education at Mariental High School in Mariental. She returned to South Africa and studied at the University of Stellenbosch.

She served as an alderman for Ward 70 in the Cape Town City Council. Labuschagne served as a Member of the Western Cape Provincial Parliament from 6 May 2009 until 6 May 2014. During her tenure in the Provincial Parliament, she served as Chairperson of the Standing Committee on Local Government Oversight. She also served as the Democratic Alliance's spokesperson on Education.

Labuschagne took office as a Member of the NCOP on 22 May 2014. She is a member of the Western Cape provincial delegation. She is currently serving as a whip for the party. She was elected leader of the Democratic Alliance NCOP caucus on 19 September 2016, succeeding Elza van Lingen, who had resigned to become Mayor of Kouga.

In May 2019, Labuschagne was re-elected as leader of the Democratic Alliance in the NCOP.
