= History of South Africa (1994–present) =

South Africa since 1994 transitioned from the system of apartheid to one of majority rule. The election of 1994 resulted in a change in government with the African National Congress (ANC) coming to power. The ANC retained power after subsequent elections in 1999, 2004, 2009, 2014, and 2019, However, in 2024, they officially lost the National Majority and had to form a Government of National Unity with other political parties, including the former official opposition, the Democratic Alliance (DA).

== Mandela presidency (1994–1999) ==
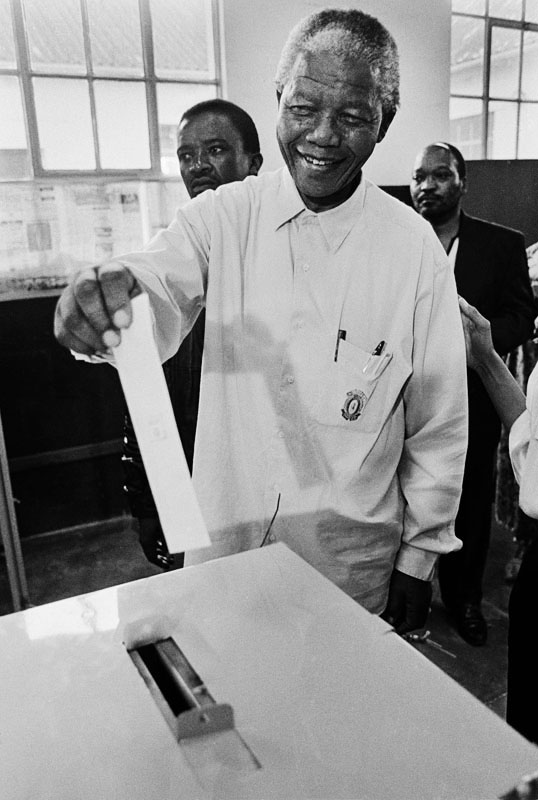
Nelson Mandela casts his vote in the 1994 election

Following the election of 27 April 1994, Nelson Mandela was sworn in as President of South Africa. The Government of National Unity was established; its cabinet made up of twelve African National Congress representatives, six from the National Party, and three from the Inkatha Freedom Party. Thabo Mbeki and F.W. de Klerk were made deputy presidents. Economically, the government embarked on the Reconstruction and Development Programme (RDP) to address the socio-economic consequences of apartheid, including alleviating poverty and addressing the massive shortfalls in social services across the country - something that the government acknowledged would rely upon a stronger macroeconomic environment.

In 1995, the interim constitution agreed to during the negotiations to end apartheid was replaced by a new constitution. The government also established the Truth and Reconciliation Commission (TRC) to expose the crimes of the apartheid era. The commission heard many stories of horrific brutality and injustice from all sides of the struggle, and offered some catharsis to people and communities shattered by their past experiences.

The TRC operated by allowing victims to tell their stories and by allowing perpetrators to confess their guilt, with amnesty on offer to those who made a full confession. Those who chose not to appear before the commission would face criminal prosecution if the authorities could prove their guilt. But while some soldiers, police, and ordinary citizens confessed their crimes, few of those who had given the orders presented themselves. For example, former State President P. W. Botha and then-Deputy President Thabo Mbeki refused to appear before the commission.

A Growth, Employment and Redistribution (GEAR) strategy was adopted in June 1996. The GEAR strategy was influenced by the economic ideas that became known as the Washington Consensus; it aimed to cut state expenditure, rationalise the public sector and reduce the budget deficit to 3% by 1999. Trevor Manuel had just been appointed Minister of Finance. The GEAR strategy was probably adopted under some pressure from international investors.

In 1995, South Africa hosted and won the 1995 Rugby World Cup. Nelson Mandela wore a Springbok rugby jersey to present the William Webb Ellis Cup to South African captain Francois Pienaar, a symbolic image of reconciliation between the races.

== Mbeki presidency (1999–2008) ==
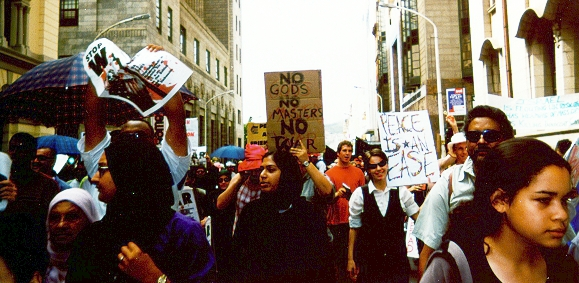
Protests against the Iraq War in Cape Town on 15 February 2003

In 1999, South Africa held its second non-racial elections. The governing ANC increased their majority, putting the party within one seat of the two-thirds majority that would allow it to alter the constitution. Thabo Mbeki was elected as the nation's second black president.

The National Party (NP), restyled as the New National Party (NNP), lost two-thirds of its seats, as well as official opposition status to the Democratic Party (DP). The DP had traditionally functioned as a stronghold of liberal whites, and now gained new support from conservatives disenchanted with the NP, and from some middle-class blacks. Just behind the DP came the KwaZulu-Natal Inkatha Freedom Party (IFP), historically the voice of Zulu nationalism. While the IFP lost some support, its leader, Mangosuthu Buthelezi, continued to exercise power as the national Home Affairs minister.

While the ANC grassroots held Mbeki in far less affection than the beloved "Madiba" (Nelson Mandela), Mbeki proved himself to be a shrewd politician, maintaining his political pre-eminence by isolating or co-opting opposition parties. However, Mbeki's effective denial of the HIV crisis invited global criticism, and his conspicuous failure to condemn the deteriorating situation in neighbouring Zimbabwe unnerved South African landowners.

In June 2005, corruption allegations related to a national arms deal surfaced against the country's deputy president, Jacob Zuma, after his financial advisor, Schabir Shaik, was convicted of corruption and fraud. In the aftermath of the conviction, Mbeki dismissed Zuma as deputy president. Zuma was subsequently charged with corruption in a case which was still unresolved as of 2009; in the meantime, Zuma's power base within the ANC had grown significantly. Popular support for Mbeki also suffered from the feeling that his government's economic policies had failed to generate inclusive development.

The Black Economic Empowerment programme was implemented from 2003 to redress the inequalities of the apartheid era. It was criticised as benefiting mostly a narrow stratum of previously disadvantaged groups, and the programme was re-launched in 2007 as Broad-Based Black Economic Empowerment.

Crime in South Africa remained a massive problem. The Economist reported the killing of approximately 1,500 white farmers in attacks since 1991, and in both 1995 and 1998, the country led the world in reported murders. In an effort to combat the alarming murder rates, the government published statistics showing a steady, albeit tiny decrease in the murder rate since 1994; however this varied across the country. In 2001, a South African was more likely to be murdered than die in a car crash.

According to The Economist, an estimated 250,000 white South Africans emigrated between 1994 and 2005.

=== Recall of Mbeki ===
At the 52nd National Conference of the African National Congress at Polokwane in December 2007, Mbeki lost the race for the presidency of the ANC to his former Deputy President, Jacob Zuma. All leadership positions within the ANC went to Zuma supporters, representing a major power shift within the ruling party. The ejection of Mbeki was followed by a gradual move to the left in the country's economic policy.

Zuma, then president of the ANC; and ANC candidate for president in the 2009 general election, continued to face charges of corruption relating to the multi-billion rand arms deal. However, in 2008 a landmark ruling by high court judge Chris Nicholson found that the re-charging of Zuma by the National Prosecuting Authority was illegal and was unduly influenced by Mbeki due to political motives. The case against Zuma was thus dismissed.

As a consequence of the judge's findings of political interference, the ANC's National Executive Committee requested the recall of Mbeki as the country's president. Mbeki tendered his resignation on 21 September 2008. Nicholson's judgement was later overturned on appeal.

== Motlanthe presidency (2008–2009) ==
Following Mbeki's resignation, Kgalema Motlanthe was appointed president by the South African National Assembly on 25 September 2008. The ANC made it clear that Motlanthe would be a "caretaker" president until the election on 22 April 2009, for which Jacob Zuma was the ANC's presidential candidate.

Tensions within the ANC following Mbeki's departure led to a number of prominent members defecting to form a new party, the Congress of the People (COPE), under the leadership of Mosiuoa Lekota, Mbhazima Shilowa and Mluleki George.

== Zuma presidency (2009–2018) ==
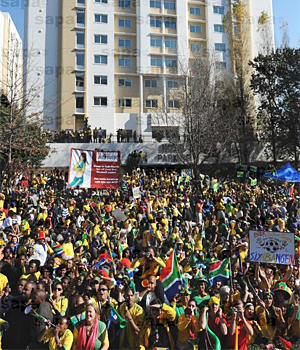
Crowds gathering ahead of the 2010 FIFA World Cup opening ceremony

The ANC majority was reduced to below the two-thirds level in the 2009 general election with 65.9% of the vote, with the opposition Democratic Alliance (formerly Democratic Party) winning the province of the Western Cape and increasing its overall share of the vote to 16.7%. COPE attained 7.4%. Jacob Zuma was sworn in as president on 9 May 2009. The shift in economic policy, started with Mbeki's ejection from the presidency, continued with the appointment of Pravin Gordhan as Finance Minister instead of Trevor Manuel.

In 2010, South Africa hosted the 2010 FIFA World Cup, the first time it was hosted in Africa.

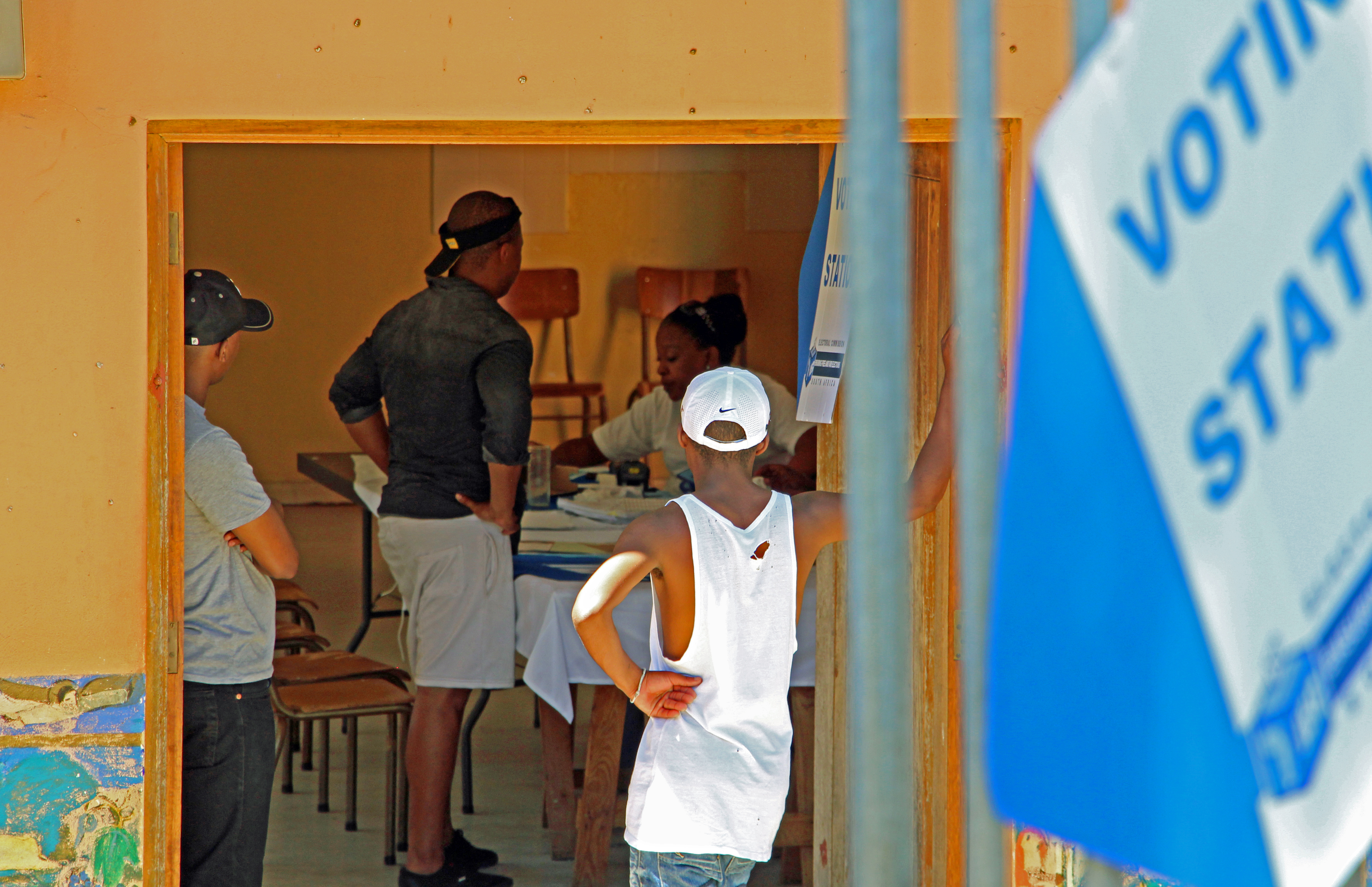
Born-free generation registering to vote for the first time in the 2014 general election

The 2014 general election was again won by the ANC, though its share of the vote fell to 62.1%. The Democratic Alliance (DA) increased its vote to 22.2% and confirmed its role as main opposition party. The DA got 6% of the black vote and almost 93% of the white vote, and is often described as a "white" party. It is also sometimes described as a "centre-right" party. The Economic Freedom Fighters (EFF), led by former ANC youth leader Julius Malema, gained 6.4% of the vote and entered parliament as the third largest party. The EFF opposes what it sees as the "pro-business" stance of both ANC and DA; it also supports land reform.

=== Resignation of Zuma ===
From 2015, Jacob Zuma was understood to favour his ex-wife, Nkosazana Dlamini-Zuma, to succeed him both as President of the African National Congress and as President of South Africa, in order to retain his control of the ANC and the state through her, and to avoid prosecution for still pending criminal charges. In December 2017, Dlamini-Zuma was defeated by Cyril Ramaphosa in the election for the ANC Presidency at the ANC Conference at Nasrec, Johannesburg.

Following the end of Zuma's term as ANC President, pressure grew for Zuma to be replaced as President of South Africa. The annual State of the Nation Address scheduled for 8 February was postponed indefinitely 2 days beforehand. After a week of discussions within ANC structures and between Ramaphosa and Zuma, the ANC announced on 13 February that Zuma had been requested to resign, but had refused, and that the ANC was therefore "recalling" him from the Presidency. Facing a motion of no confidence in Parliament scheduled for 15 February, Jacob Zuma announced his resignation with immediate effect in a late night address on 14 February.

== Ramaphosa presidency (2018–present) ==
Following Zuma's resignation, Acting President Cyril Ramaphosa of the ruling African National Congress was elected unopposed as President of South Africa by the National Assembly on 15 February 2018.

In February 2018, the Parliament of South Africa passed a motion to review the property ownership clause of the constitution, to allow for the expropriation of land, in the public interest, without compensation. In August 2018, the South African government began the process of taking two privately owned farms by filing papers seeking to acquire the farms via eminent domain for one-tenth of the price that the owner wants, (which in one case is based on possible value when the farm is developed into an eco-estate). According to a 2017 government audit, 72 percent of the nation's private farmland is owned by white people, who make up 9 percent of the population.

In May 2019, South Africa's African National Congress (ANC) won the parliamentary election, but with a reduced majority. The ANC, led by President Ramaphosa, held its outright majority with 58% of the vote, being the worst performance of ANC in any national election to that point. The main opposition party, the Democratic Alliance (DA) got 21% of the vote and the radical Economic Freedom Fighters (EFF), led by Julius Malema, came third with 11%.

2024 general election

The 2024 general election was considered by many to be the most consequential election since 1994. The popularity of the ANC waned as the country faced further power cuts, soaring crime, and stagnating growth. Several opposition parties, primarily led by the DA, formed the Multi-Party Charter, an electoral agreement to challenge the ANC. Additionally, uMkhonto weSizwe (MK), a new party led by Jacob Zuma, threatened the ANC from the left-wing.

The election saw a historic decline for the ANC, losing their majority in the National Assembly, primarily to the MK, which saw most support in KwaZulu-Natal. This led to the ANC to form a Second Government of National Unity, a coalition with the DA, IFP, Patriotic Alliance, Freedom Front Plus and GOOD.

== Emigration, debt burden and poverty ==
The immediate post-apartheid period was marked by an exodus of skilled white South Africans, who left due to safety concerns. The South African Institute of Race Relations estimated in 2008 that 800,000 or more white people had emigrated overseas since 1995, out of the approximately 4,000,000 who were in South Africa when apartheid formally ended the year before. Large white South African diasporas, both English- and Afrikaans-speaking, sprouted in Australia, New Zealand, North America, and especially in the United Kingdom to which around 550,000 South Africans emigrated.

The apartheid government had declared a moratorium on foreign debt repayments in the mid-1980s when it declared a state of emergency in the face of escalating civil unrest. With the formal end of apartheid in 1994, the newly elected ANC government was saddled with a foreign debt amounting to 86,700,000,000 rands ($14,000,000,000 at then current exchange rates) accrued by the former apartheid regime. The cash-strapped government was obliged to repay this debt, or else face a credit downgrading by foreign financial institutions. The debt was finally settled in September 2001.

A further financial burden was imposed on the new post-apartheid government through its decision to provide antiretroviral (ARV) treatment to impoverished victims of the HIV-AIDS epidemic sweeping the country. South Africa had the highest prevalence of HIV-AIDS compared to any other country in the world, with 5,600,000 people afflicted by the disease and 270,000 HIV-related deaths were recorded in 2011. By that time, more than 2,000,000 children were orphaned due to the epidemic. The provision of ARV treatment resulted in 100,000 fewer AIDS-related deaths in 2011, than in 2005.

Migrant labour remained a fundamental aspect of the South African mining industry, which employed half a million largely black miners. Labour unrest in the industry resulted in a massacre which took place in mid-August 2012, during which; anti-riot police shot dead 34 striking miners and wounded many more in what is now known as the Marikana massacre. The migrant labour system was identified as a primary cause of the unrest. Multinational mining corporations including Anglo-American Corporation, Lonmin, and Anglo Platinum, were accused of failing to address the enduring legacies of apartheid.

By 2014, around 47% of mostly black South Africans continued to live in poverty, making it one of the most unequal countries in the world. Widespread dissatisfaction with the slow pace of socio-economic transformation, government incompetence and maladministration, and other public grievances in the post-apartheid era, precipitated many violent protest demonstrations. In 2007, less than half the protests were associated with some form of violence, compared with 2014 when almost 80% of protests involved violence on the part of the participants or the authorities. The slow pace of transformation also fomented tensions within the tripartite alliance between the ANC, the South African Communist Party and the Congress of South African Trade Unions.

The ANC had risen to power on the strength of a socialist agenda embodied in a Freedom Charter, which was intended to form the basis of ANC social, economic and political policies. The Charter decreed that "the national wealth of our country, the heritage of South Africans, shall be restored to the people; the mineral wealth beneath the soil, the banks and monopoly industry shall be transferred to the ownership of the people". ANC icon Nelson Mandela, asserted in a statement released on 25 January 1990: "The nationalisation of the mines, banks and monopoly industries is the policy of the ANC, and a change or modification of our views in this regard is inconceivable." But, after the ANC's electoral victory in 1994, the eradication of mass poverty through nationalisation was never implemented. The ANC-led government, in a historic reversal of policy, adopted neoliberalism instead. A wealth tax on the super-rich to fund developmental projects was set aside, while domestic and international corporations, enriched by apartheid, were excused from any financial reparations. Large corporations were allowed to shift their main listings abroad. These policies have been criticised.
