= National Women's Day =

Public holiday in South Africa

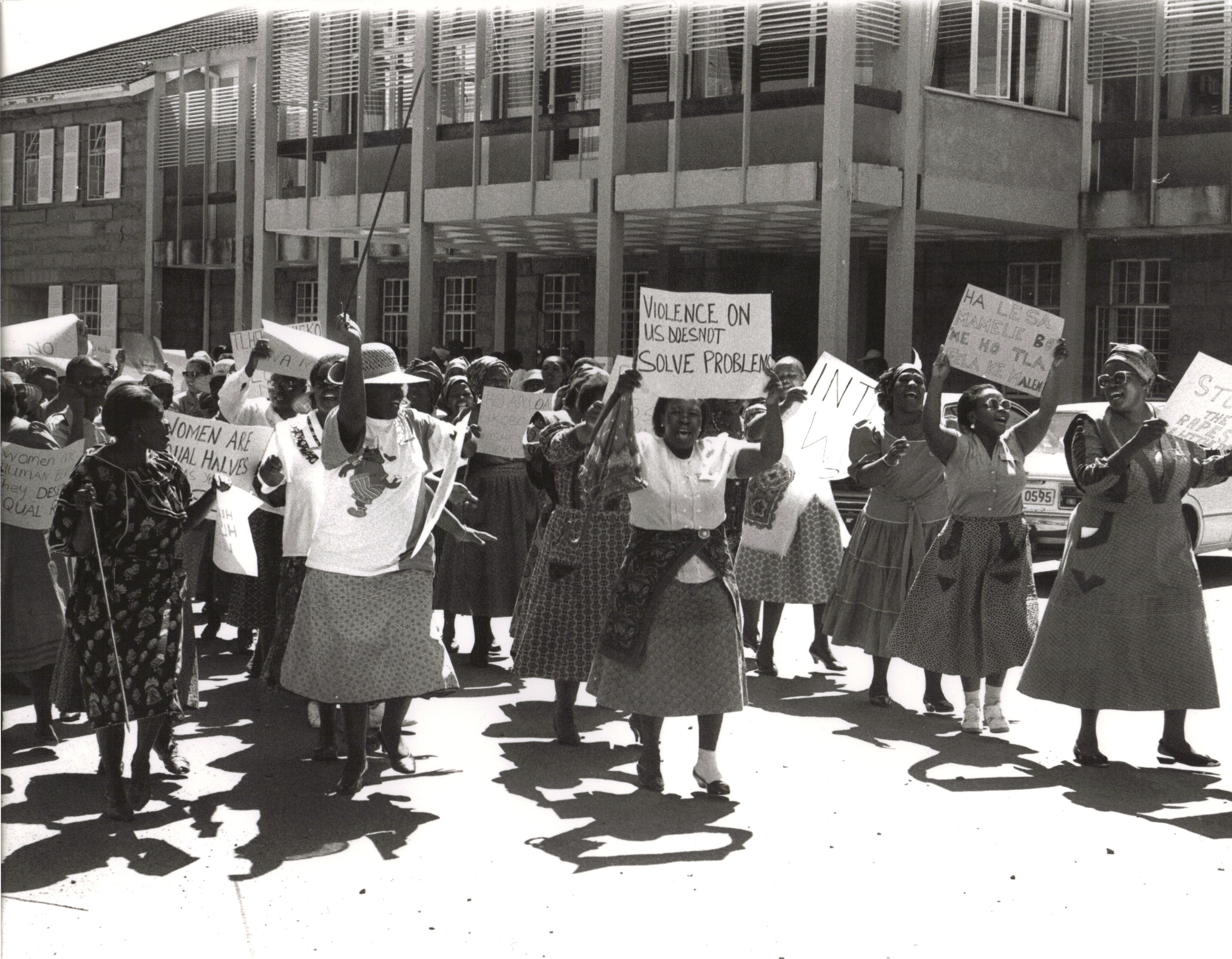
- Women in Lesotho at a National Women's Day protest against violence against women at the National University of Lesotho
- Observed by: South Africa
- Date: 9 August
- Next time: 9 August 2027
- Frequency: Annual
- First time: 9 August 1995

National Women's Day is a South African public holiday celebrated annually on 9 August. The day commemorates the 1956 march of approximately 20,000 women of all races to the Union Buildings in Pretoria to petition against the country's pass laws that required South Africans defined as "black" under the Population Registration Act to carry an internal passport, known as a passbook, that served to maintain population segregation, control urbanisation, and manage migrant labour during the apartheid era. The first National Women's Day was celebrated on 9 August 1995. In 2006, a reenactment of the march was staged for its 50th anniversary, with many of the 1956 march veterans.

== 1956 Women's March ==
On 9 August 1956, more than 20,000 South African women of all races staged a march on the Union Buildings in protest against the proposed amendments to the Urban Areas Act of 1950, commonly referred to as the "pass laws". The march was led by Lillian Ngoyi, Helen Joseph, Rahima Moosa and Sophia Williams. Other participants included Frances Baard, a statue of whom was unveiled by Northern Cape Premier Hazel Jenkins in Kimberley (Frances Baard District Municipality) on National Women's Day 2009. The women left 14,000 petitions at the office doors of prime minister J. G. Strijdom. The women stood silently for 30 minutes and then started singing a protest song that was composed in honour of the occasion: Wathint'Abafazi Wathint'imbokodo! (Now you have touched the women, you have struck a rock.). In the years since, the phrase (or its latest incarnation: "you strike a woman, you strike a rock") has come to represent women's courage and strength in South Africa.

== Significance ==
National Women's Day draws attention to significant issues African women still face, such as parenting, domestic violence, sexual harassment in the workplace, unequal pay, and schooling for all girls. It can be used as a day to fight for or protest these ideas. Due to this public holiday, there have been many significant advances. Before 1994, women had low representation in the Parliament, only at 2.7%. Women in the national assembly were at 27.7%. This number has nearly doubled, being at 48% representation throughout the country's government. National Women's Day is based around much of the same principles as International Women's Day, and strives for much of the same freedoms and rights.

== See also ==
- International Women's Day
- Public holidays in South Africa
