= Heritage Day (South Africa) =

South African public holiday

- Observed by: South Africans
- Significance: Celebrates the cultural heritage of South Africans
- Date: 24 September
- Next time: 24 September 2027
- Frequency: Annual
- First time: 24 September 1995; 31 years ago

Heritage Day (Afrikaans: Erfenisdag; Xhosa: Usuku Lwamagugu, Usuku lokugubha amasiko) is a South African public holiday celebrated on 24 September. On this day, South Africans are encouraged to celebrate their culture and the diversity and traditions, in the wider context of a nation that belongs to all its people.

As with all public holidays in South Africa, when Heritage Day falls on a Sunday, the following Monday is observed as a public holiday.

== History ==
In KwaZulu-Natal, 24 September was known as Shaka Day for most people, in commemoration of Shaka, the King of the Zulu, on the presumed date of his death in 1828. Shaka played an important role in uniting the disparate Nguni clans into a cohesive Zulu nation. Each year people gather at the Shaka Memorial to honour him on this day.

The Public Holidays Bill presented to the post-Apartheid Parliament of South Africa in 1994 did not include 24 September on the list of proposed public holidays. As a result of this exclusion, the Inkatha Freedom Party (IFP), a South African political party with a large Zulu membership, objected to the bill. Parliament and the ANC reached a compromise, and the day was given its present title and accepted as a public holiday now known as Heritage Day.

Heritage Day is when South Africans celebrate the diverse cultural heritage that makes up the "rainbow nation". It is the day to celebrate the contribution of all South Africans to the building of the country.

— Lowry 1995, p. 21

== Celebration ==
South Africans celebrate the day by remembering the cultural heritage of the many cultures that make up the population of South Africa. Various events are staged throughout the country such as braais (barbecues) to commemorate/remember this day.

Former Western Cape Provincial Premier Ebrahim Rasool addressed the public at a Heritage Day celebration, at the Gugulethu Heritage trail in 2007 in Gugulethu. In Hout Bay, there is an army procession and a recreation of the battle fought there.
