= International Day of the African Child =

Annual observance on June 16

The International Day of the African Child, also known as the Day of the African Child (DAC), has been celebrated on June 16 every year since 1991, when it was first initiated by the OAU Organisation of African Unity. This day honors those who participated in the Soweto Uprising in 1976. It also raises awareness of the continuing need to improve the education provided to Indigenous African children.

On June 16, 1976, in Soweto, South Africa, about ten thousand black school children marched in a column more than half a mile long, protesting the poor quality of their education and demanding their right to be taught in their own language. Hundreds of students were shot, including Hector Pieterson. More than a hundred people were killed in the protests of the following two weeks, with more than a thousand being injured.

On June 16 every year, governments, NGOs, international organisation,' and other stakeholders gather to discuss the challenges and opportunities facing the full realization of the rights of children in Africa. For 2014, the theme chosen returns to the roots of the movement: A child-friendly, quality, free, and compulsory education for all children in Africa. It focuses on the barriers African children face in order to receive a quality education. It is also observed to show respect to the past students who dedicated their lives to their community by helping students today reach their goals through black student scholarships based on their African heritage.

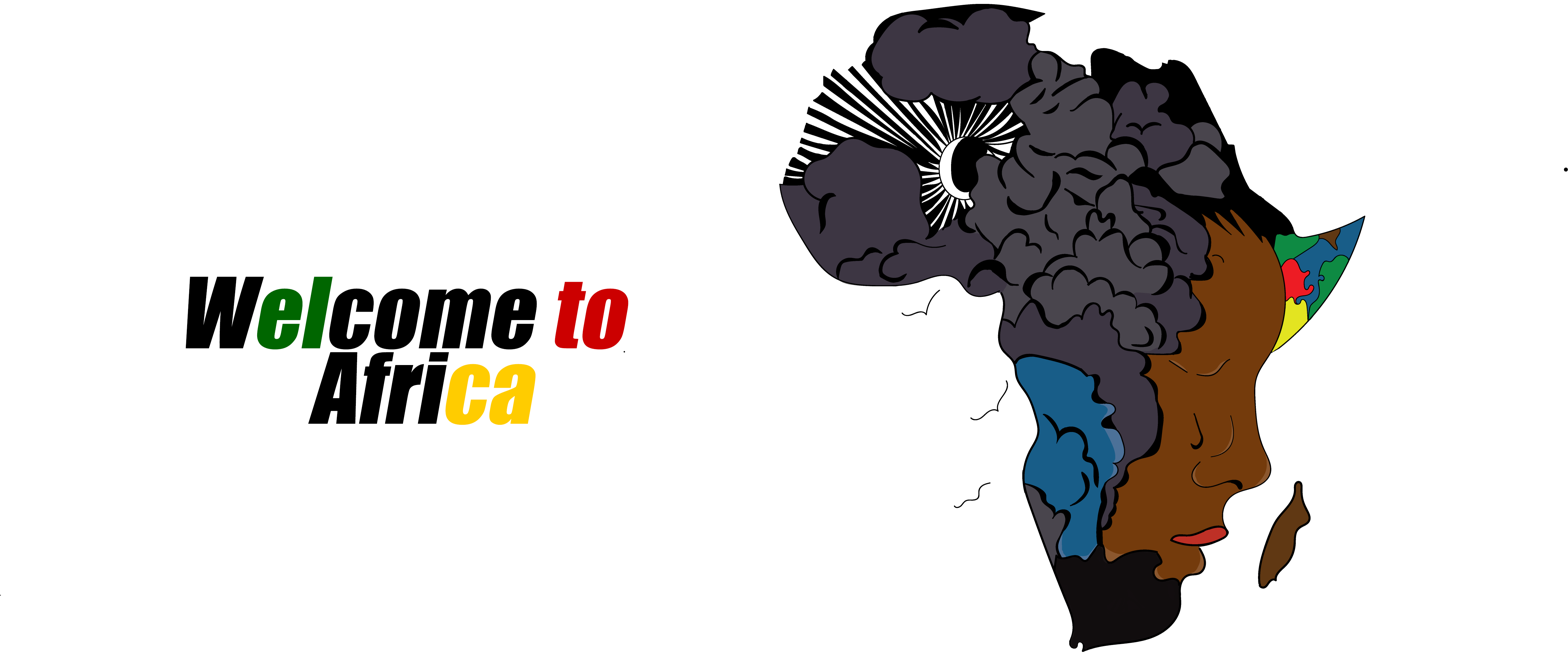
Africa

In 2026, the African Union declared the theme as "Assuring Sustainable Water Availability and Safe Sanitation Systems to Achieve the Goals of Agenda 2063". This theme elevates water and sanitation to a continental political priority, recognizing them as catalysts for economic transformation, climate, resilience, public health and food security and regional stability.

== See also ==
- African Charter on the Rights and Welfare of the Child
- Africa Day
- Children's Day
- International Mother Language Day
