= Freedom Day (South Africa) =

Public holiday on 27 April in South Africa

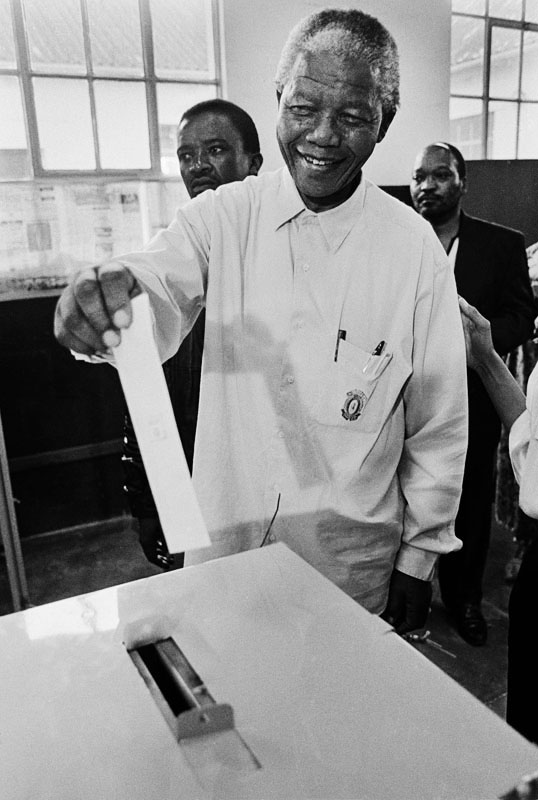
- Nelson Mandela casting his vote on Election Day 1994
- Observed by: Republic of South Africa
- Type: National
- Celebrations: Presidential speech
- Date: 27 April
- Next time: 27 April 2027
- Frequency: Annual
- First time: 27 April 1994; 32 years ago
- Related to: South African general election, 1994

Freedom Day is a public holiday in South Africa celebrated on 27 April. It commemorates the first post-apartheid elections held on that day in 1994 and the day on which the new constitution was introduced. The elections were the first national elections where everyone of voting age of over 18 from any race group, was allowed to vote.

It is one of the twelve public holidays determined by the Public Holidays Act (No. 36 of 1994).

On the first commemoration of the holiday, President Nelson Mandela addressed Parliament:

As a new dawn ushered in this day, the 27th of April 1994, few of us could suppress the welling of emotion, as we were reminded of the terrible past from which we come as a nation; the great possibilities that we now have; and the bright future that beckons us. And so we assemble here today, and in other parts of the country, to mark a historic day in the life of our nation. Wherever South Africans are across the globe, our hearts beat as one, as we renew our common loyalty to our country and our commitment to its future.

Freedom Day is an annual celebration held on 27 April in South Africa. The day reminds South Africans of the sacrifices made by individuals and nations to break them away from the chains of segregation by a select few. It reminds them of the efforts of their national heroes, particularly Nelson Mandela. He is regarded as a champion of freedom, not only in South Africa but the entire world. It is a day that not only marks the emancipation of South Africans from apartheid but also returned their essential human rights in 1994.

== See also ==
- History of South Africa
- South African general election, 1994
