= 2020 in South Africa =

- Decades: 2000s; 2010s; 2020s
- See also: List of years in South Africa

Events in the year 2020 in South Africa.

== Incumbents ==
- President: Cyril Ramaphosa (ANC)
- Deputy President: David Mabuza (ANC)
- Chief Justice: Mogoeng Mogoeng
- Deputy Chief Justice: Raymond Zondo
- President of the Supreme Court of Appeal: Mandisa Maya
- Deputy President of the Supreme Court of Appeal: Xola Petse
- Chairperson of the Electoral Court of South Africa: Khayelihle Kenneth Mthiyane
- Speaker of the National Assembly: Thandi Modise (ANC)
- Deputy Speaker of the National Assembly: Lechesa Tsenoli (ANC)
- Leader of the Opposition in the National Assembly: John Steenhuisen (DA)
- Leader of Government Business: David Mabuza (ANC)
- Government Chief Whip (of the National Assembly): Pemmy Majodina (ANC)
- Opposition Chief Whip (of the National Assembly): Natasha Mazzone (DA)
- Chairperson of the National Council of Provinces: Amos Masondo (ANC)
- Deputy Chairperson of the National Council of Provinces: Sylvia Lucas (ANC)
- Leader of the Opposition of the National Council of Provinces: Cathlene Labuschagne (DA)
- Chief Whip of the National Council of Provinces: Seiso Mohai (ANC)

=== Cabinet ===
The Cabinet, together with the President and the Deputy President, forms the Executive.

=== Provincial Premiers ===
- Eastern Cape Province: Oscar Mabuyane (ANC)
- Free State Province: Sisi Ntombela (ANC)
- Gauteng Province: David Makhura (ANC)
- KwaZulu-Natal Province: Sihle Zikalala (ANC)
- Limpopo Province: Stanley Mathabatha (ANC)
- Mpumalanga Province: Refilwe Mtsweni-Tsipane (ANC)
- North West Province: Job Mokgoro (ANC)
- Northern Cape Province: Zamani Saul (ANC)
- Western Cape Province: Alan Winde (DA)

== Events ==
=== January to March ===
- 3 February – A court issues an arrest warrant for former president Jacob Zuma on corruption charges. Zuma, 77, is presumed to be in Cuba for medical treatment, but it is unclear when or if he will return to South Africa since the two countries have not signed an extradition treaty. The case will resume on 6 May.
- 5 February – German Chancellor Angela Merkel arrives in South Africa to discuss trade, investment, and energy issues.
- 11 February – Former U.S. Vice-President Joe Biden says he and then U.S. Ambassador to the United Nations Andrew Young were arrested in Soweto when they tried to visit Nelson Mandela on Robben Island in 1977. Young says he was not arrested in South Africa and doubts Biden was.
- 19 February – Speaking from Addis Ababa, U.S. Secretary of State Mike Pompeo asserts that land distribution without compensation would be disastrous for South Africa and its people.
- 21 February – Sixteen children in Zola, Soweto, are hospitalized for eating expired sweets. 39 pupils were hospitalized earlier in the week.
- 5 March - The COVID-19 pandemic spread to South Africa, with the first confirmed case announced on 5 March 2020 by Minister of Health Zweli Mkhize.
- 15 March – President Cyril Ramaphosa addressed the nation and announced that there shouldn't be any gathering which is more than 100 people until further notice to avoid the spreading of COVID-19 pandemic.
- 21 March – Human Rights Day in South Africa
- 23 March – President Cyril Ramaphosa addressed the nation and announced a 21-day national lockdown effective from midnight 26 March through to 16 April, with the deployment of the South African National Defence Force (SANDF) and South African Police Service (SAPS) to support the government.
- 27 March – The first person was confirmed to die of COVID-19 case, announced on 27 March 2020 by Minister of Health Zweli Mkhize.

=== April to June ===
- 9 April – the President announced a two-week lockdown extension, until the end of April.
- 18 April – President Cyril Ramaphosa announces that lockdown restrictions will be gradually eased. Mines can resume work at 50% capacity and the economy is expected to contract by 6.1% this year.
- 19 April – South African Airways plans to fire all 4,700 employees at the end of April after failing to get any more government subsidies.
- 23 April – President Ramaphosa's efforts to combat the coronavirus pandemic receive praise. South Africa has confirmed 3,953 cases and 75 deaths so far. The government has earmarked 500 billion rand ($26.16 billion), or 10% of national output, to fight the virus, keep businesses afloat and prevent the poor—who make up half the population—from going hungry. South Africa has tested 140,000 people, with nearly 4,000 positive cases and 75 deaths.
- 26 April
  - Cuba sends 200 doctors to South Africa.
  - Police Minister Bheki Cele apologised for a "blasphemous" remark made to praying Muslims by a policeman enforcing coronavirus rules. Twenty-four people were arrested in the incident.
- 27 April – Freedom Day
- 1 May
  - International Workers' Day
  - South Africa now enters Level 4 of the national lockdown to ensure the economy can gradually reopen with some easing of other restrictions.
- 12 June – Femicide is described as a second pandemic as more than 20 women and children are murdered in a matter of weeks.
- 25 May – Africa Day
- 16 June – Youth Day

=== July to September ===
- 1 July – COVID-19 pandemic: 159,333 confirmed cases and 2,749 deaths. The worst affected area is Western Cape.
- 6 July – COVID-19 pandemic: Thousands of students from grades 7 to 12 return to classes after schools were closed for four months due to the coronavirus.
- 11 July – COVID-19 pandemic: Confirmed cases doubled in two weeks to 250,000 with 3,800 deaths. Public hospitals are short on medical oxygen.
- 12 July – Four people are killed, six injured, and forty arrested in a hostage situation at the International Pentecostal Holiness Church headquarters in Zuurbekom near Johannesburg.
- 13 July – COVID-19 pandemic: A 9pm to 6pm curfew and a ban on sales of alcohol are reinstituted. Family and social visits remain banned.
- 22 July - South Africa's oldest pub, The Perseverance Tavern, closes due to the COVID-19 lockdown.
- 23 July – More than 17,000 excess deaths from 6 May to 14 July were reported, as compared to data from the past two years, while confirmed COVID-19 deaths have surpassed 6,000. The South African Medical Research Council said the excess deaths could be related to COVID-19, HIV/AIDS, or tuberculosis, although many doctors suspect coronavirus. South Africa now has the world's fifth largest caseload with 408,052 confirmed cases.
- 25 August – A fire burns the 139-year-old Grey Street mosque in the Durban, South African.
- 7 September – Members of the Economic Freedom Fighters force the closing of 60 "Clicks" retail health care stores after the chain displays possible racist ads of hair care products.
- 8 September – The ANC strongly condemns Donald Trump's negative remarks about Nelson Mandela in Disloyal: A Memoir by Michael Cohen. "The mark of a true leader is not how many enemies you create but how many friendships you cultivate, even where strong differences of opinion exist," said the ANC. The Nelson Mandela Foundation also condemns Trump's remarks.
- 24 September – Heritage Day (South Africa)

=== October to December ===
- 6 October - Stun grenades are fired by police to disperse protesting white farmers after they storm the courthouse in Senekal, Free State. The protesters were demanding that two men detained over a young farm manager's murder be handed over to them. Brendin Horner's body was found tied to a pole on the farm he managed, after he was allegedly killed by stock thieves.
- 15 November – Preacher Shepherd Bushiri and his wife flee to Malawi to avoid a fraud trial started in South Africa.
- 16 November – Former president Jacob Zuma testifies before a state commission investigating allegations of corruption from 2009 to 2018.
- 15 December – Ace Magashule is asked to step down from the African National Congress after being charged with 21 counts of corruption.
- 18 December – COVID-19 pandemic: Minister of Health Zweli Mkhize said scientists had discovered a new variant of virus, called 501.V2 Variant. Nearly 900,000 South Africans had been infected and 20,000 had died.
- 27 December – COVID-19 pandemic: The number of confirmed cases passes one million.

== Scheduled events ==
- 16 December – Day of Reconciliation
- 26 December – Day of Goodwill

=== Sports ===
- 29 November 2019 to 1 February 2020 – 2019–20 CAF Champions League group stage
- 1 December 2019 to 2 February 2020 – 2019–20 CAF Confederation Cup group stage
- 17 January to 9 February – 2020 ICC Under-19 Cricket World Cup
- 20 to 23 April 2020 – 2020 IIHF World Championship Division III, Cape Town
- May TBA – Finals of 2020 African U-17 Women's World Cup Qualifying Tournament Began January 2020
- 21 June – Finals of 2020 African U-20 Women's World Cup Qualifying Tournament
- 18 July – The 3TC Solidarity Cup, a charity cricket match with an experimental 3 team format, was played. It marked the return to cricket in the country following the easing of coronavirus related restrictions.
- 8 August to 27 September – 2020 Rugby Championship, featuring Argentina, Australia, South Africa and New Zealand.
- 5 to 12 October – 2022 FIFA World Cup qualification — CAF second round
- 13 October – 2020 MEA Rugby League Championship, Pretoria

=== Television ===
- 14 March – Scheduled date for the 2020 DStv Mzansi Viewers' Choice Awards

== Deaths ==
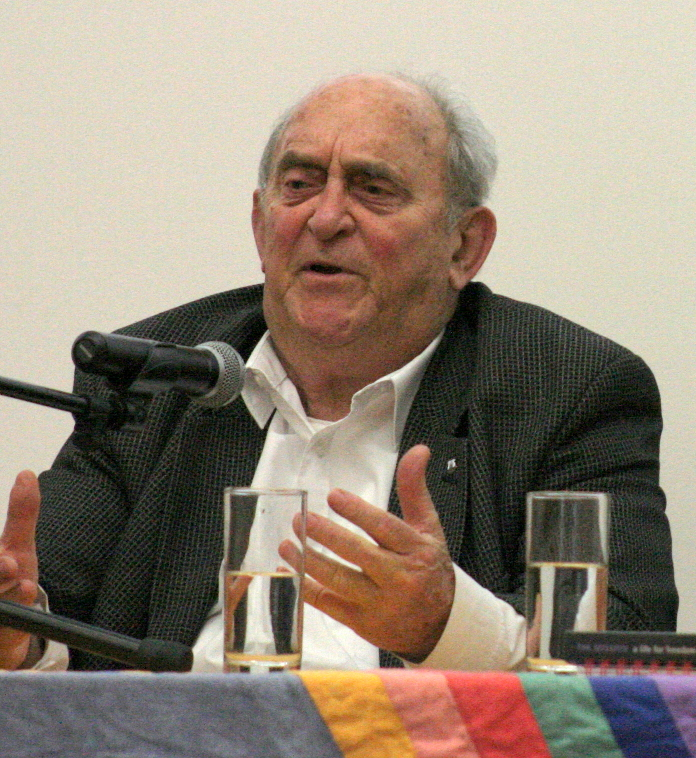
Denis Goldberg

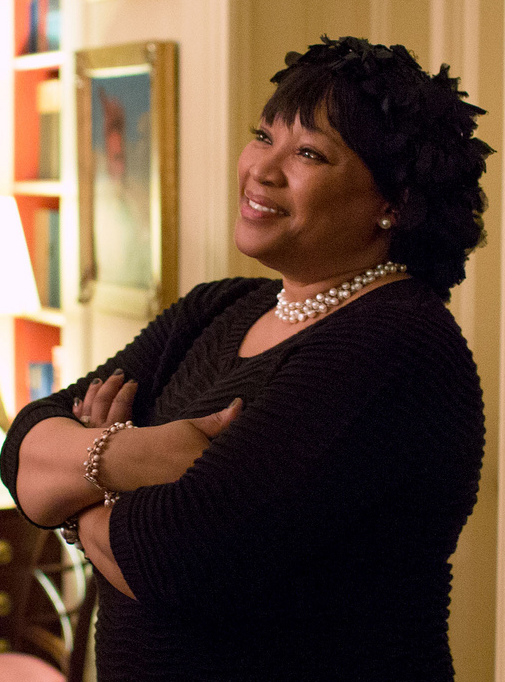
Zindzi Mandela

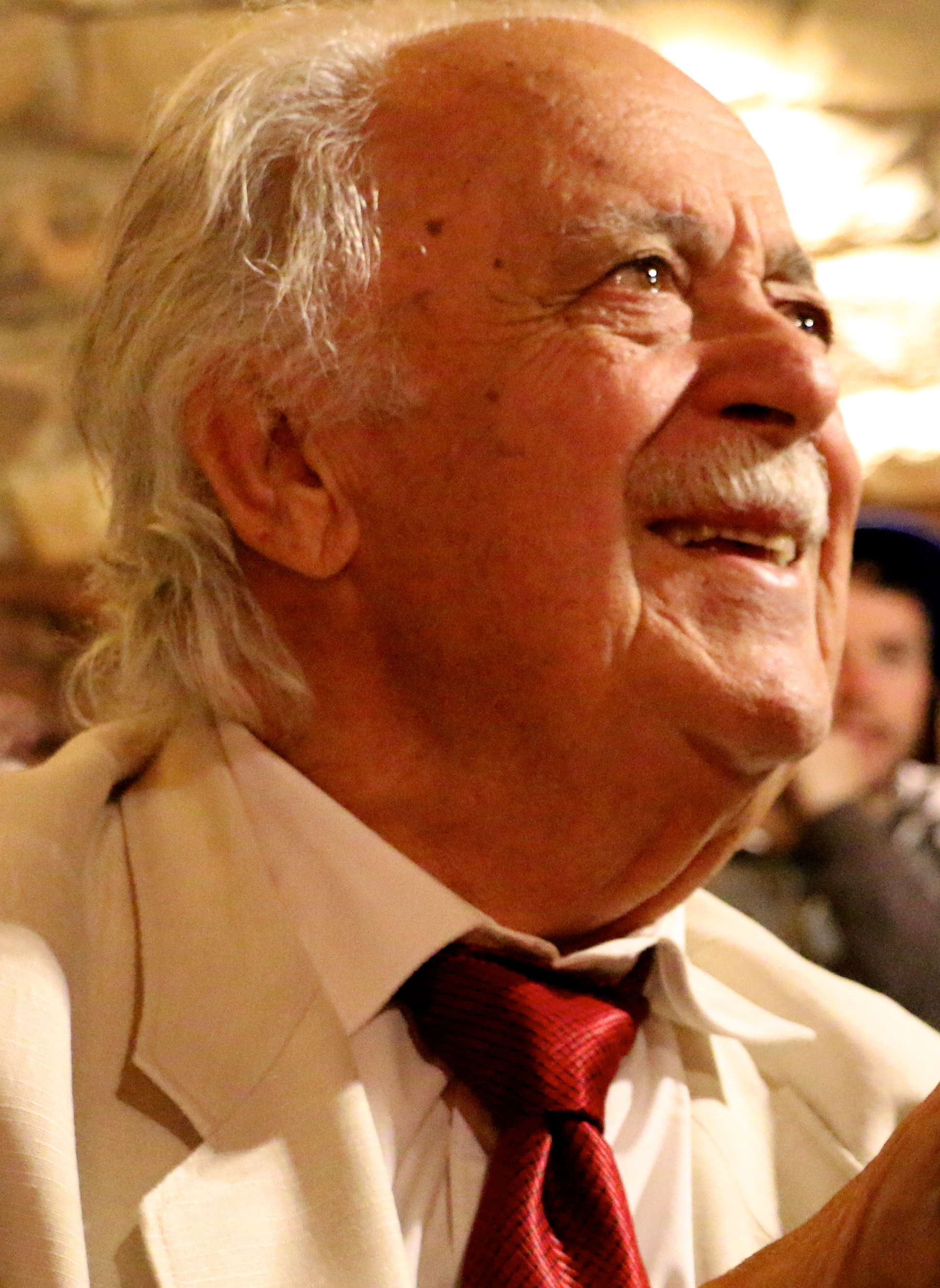
George Bizos

=== January to March ===
- 6 January – Richard Maponya, 99, entrepreneur and property developer (b. 1920).
- 18 January – Peter Mathebula, WBA flyweight champion boxer (b. 1952).
- 20 January – Bicks Ndoni, politician (b. 1958).
- 26 January – Santu Mofokeng, 64, South African photographer, progressive supranuclear palsy.
- 7 February – Harold Strachan, 94, South African writer and anti-apartheid activist.
- 11 February – Joseph Shabalala, 78, founder of Ladysmith Black Mambazo
- 20 February – Zoe Gail, 100, South African-born British singer and actress (No Orchids for Miss Blandish).
- 26 February – Clinton Marius, 53, writer and performer.
- 11 March – Mohammed Tikly, 80, South African educator and struggle veteran.
- 21 March – Sol Kerzner, 84, hotelier, founder of Southern Sun Hotel Group and Sun International, cancer.
- 25 March – Vusamazulu Credo Mutwa, 98, South African traditional healer and conspiracy theorist.
- 31 March – Gita Ramjee, 63, HIV prevention researcher; COVID-19.

=== April to June ===
- 3 April – Constand Viljoen, 86, military general and politician, MP (1994–2001).
- 17 April – Allan Heyl, convicted bank robber (Stander Gang)
- 29 April – Denis Goldberg, 87, South African lawyer and political activist (Rivonia Trial), lung cancer.
- 4 May – Cedric Xulu, 80, South African footballer (AmaZulu F.C.), cancer.
- 11 May – Ewie Cronje, 80, South African cricketer.
- 12 May - Clarence Mini, 68, South African doctor, anti-apartheid fighter, COVID-19.
- 19 May – Mary-Anne Plaatjies van Huffel, 60, South African pastor and academic; complications from surgery
- 2 June – Jeanne Goosen, 81, South African writer.
- 12 June – Kirvan Fortuin, 28, South African dancer, choreographer and LGBTQI activist, stabbed.
- 14 June – Elsa Joubert, 97, South African Sestigers writer, COVID-19.
- 24 June – Nigel Weiss, 83, mathematician.
- 30 June – David Lewis, 98, South African born American urban designer, co-founder of Urban Design Associates.

=== July to September ===
- 4 July – Mary Twala, actress (2011 Africa Movie Academy Award for Best Actress in a Supporting Role)
- 6 July
  - Gordon Kegakilwe, 53, politician; COVID-19.
  - Zithulele Patrick Mvemve, 79, Roman Catholic prelate, Auxiliary Bishop of Johannesburg (1986–1994) and Bishop of Klerksdorp (1994–2013).
- 7 July – Henry Jansen, 64, politician, Mayor of Langeberg; COVID-19.
- 8 July
  - Ricardo Mthembu, Member of the KwaZulu-Natal Legislature and ANC provincial spokesperson; COVID-19.
  - Queen Noloyiso Sandile, 56, acting Queen of AmaRharhabe; COVID-19.
  - Louis Mazibuko, 69, sports journalist.
- 9 July – Patricia Majalisa, 53, singer; heart attack.
- 10 July
  - Corra Dirksen, 82, rugby player (Northern Transvaal, national team); COVID-19.
  - Thomas Manthata, 80, anti-Apartheid activist (Delmas Treason Trial); COVID-19.
- 12 July – Alfred Mtsi, 69, politician, Mayor of Buffalo City (2015–2016), COVID-19.
- 13 July – Zindzi Mandela, 59, diplomat and poet, daughter of Nelson Mandela
- 18 July
  - Elize Cawood, 68, actress (Dis ek, Anna).
  - Ismail Ebrahim, 73, cricketer (Natal).
  - Martha Mmola, South African politician, MP (2014–2019); COVID-19.
- 21 July – Andrew Mlangeni, 95, politician, anti-Apartheid activist and the last Rivonia Trialst.
- 28 July
  - Candy Moloi, 67, actress (Muvhango), cancer.
  - Diana E. H. Russell, 81, feminist activist and writer.
- 31 July – Zamuxolo Peter, 55, politician, MP (since 2019); COVID-19.
- 6 August – John Nkadimeng, 93, politician and anti-Apartheid activist.
- 7 August – Lungile Pepeta, 46, paediatric cardiologist and academic.
- 10 August - Bob Mabena, 51, radio personality; cardiac arrest.
- 12 August – Mac Jack, 55, politician, Northern Cape MPL (since 2013); COVID-19.
- 26 August – Stuart Hailstone, 68, squash player; stroke.
- 29 August – Jürgen Schadeberg, 89, German-born South African photographer; stroke.
- 4 September
  - Peter Cronjé, 70, rugby union player (Golden Lions, national team); cancer.
  - Gregory de Vink, 22, racing cyclist; traffic collision.
- 5 September – Thandeka Mdeliswa, 34, actress (Generations: The Legacy, Isidingo, Rhythm City); shot.
- 6 September – Achmat Dangor, 71, author and political activist.
- 8 September – David Clatworthy, 60, actor (The Making of the Mahatma, District 9, Mia et le lion blanc).
- 9 September – George Bizos, 92, human rights lawyer (Rivonia Trial) and anti-apartheid activist.

=== October to December ===
- 8 October – David Ipp, 82, South African-born Australian lawyer and judge.
- 10 October – Priscilla Jana, 76, lawyer and human rights activist.
- 12 October – Vuyokazi Mahlati, social entrepreneur.
- 14 October – Herbert Kretzmer, 95, South African-born English journalist and lyricist (Les Misérables).
- 20 October – Gerrit Schoonhoven, 62, film director and actor (Sweet 'n Short, The Visual Bible: Matthew, The Mangler).
- 22 October – Stephen Gray, 78, writer (Time of Our Darkness).
- 27 October – Rolf Stumpf, 74, statistician, Vice Chancellor of Nelson Mandela University (since 2002).
- 6 November – Mluleki Ndobe, 46, politician, member of the KwaZulu-Natal Legislature (since 2019), suicide by gunshot.
- 11 November
  - Mongameli Bobani, South African politician, mayor of Nelson Mandela Bay (2018–2019), COVID-19.
  - Thembekile Kimi Makwetu, 54, South African accountant, Auditor-General (since 2013), lung cancer.
- 15 November – Anne Rasa, 80, British-born ethologist.
- 18 November – Christine Barkhuizen le Roux, 61, writer
- 19 November – Mshoza, 37, kwaito singer.
- 23 November – Anele Ngcongca, 33, footballer (FC Fortune, Genk, national team); traffic collision.
- 5 December – Belinda Bozzoli, politician, MP (since 2014), cancer.
- 7 December – Pumza Dyantyi, 72, politician and anti-apartheid activist, MP (since 2019) and Eastern Cape MPL (2014–2019).
- 9 December – Gordon Forbes, 86, tennis player; COVID-19.
- 12 December – Motjeka Madisha, 25, footballer (Highlands Park F.C., Mamelodi Sundowns, national team); traffic collision.
- 23 December – Loyiso Mpumlwana, politician, advocate and MP (2014–2019; since 2020).

== See also ==
=== Country overviews ===
- South Africa
- History of South Africa
- History of modern South Africa
- Outline of South Africa
- Government of South Africa
- Politics of South Africa
- National Council of Provinces (NCOP)
- National Assembly of South Africa
- Timeline of South Africa history
- Years in South Africa

=== Related timelines for current period ===
- 2020
- 2020 in politics and government
- 2020s
- 2020s in political history
- 2020 in East Africa
- 2020 in Middle Africa
- 2020 in North Africa
- 2020 in Southern Africa
- 2020 in West Africa
- COVID-19 pandemic
- COVID-19 pandemic by country and territory
- COVID-19 pandemic in Africa
- COVID-19 pandemic in South Africa
- List of deaths due to COVID-19
- List of notable deaths due to COVID-19 of South Africa
- 2020–21 South-West Indian Ocean cyclone season
