= 2020 in Southern Africa =

The following lists events that happened during 2020 in Southern Africa. The countries are those described in the United Nations geoscheme for Africa.

The population of Southern Africa is 67,324,356 as of April 18, 2020, based on the latest United Nations estimates. The Southern Africa population is equivalent to 0.87% of the total world population.

== Countries ==
=== Botswana ===
Botswana - Changed its name from Bechuanaland Protectorate to Botswana when it declared its independence from the United Kingdom on September 30, 1966. Thecapital of the Republic of Botswana is Gaborone. The country is a member of the African Union (AU), the Commonwealth, the Southern African Development Community (SADC), and the United Nations (UN).

- President of Botswana: Mokgweetsi Masisi (since April 1, 2018)
  - Vice-President of Botswana: Slumber Tsogwane (since April 4, 2018)

=== Eswatini ===
Eswatini (Swaziland) - Was officially the Kingdom of Swaziland until 2018; it achieved its independence from the United Kingdom in 1968. The executive capital and largest city of the Kingdom of Eswatini is Mbabane; the traditional, spiritual, and legislative capital is Lobamba. Eswatini is a member of the SADC, the AU, the Commonwealth, and the UN.

- Chief of state: Ngwenyama (King): Mswati III (since April 25, 1986)
- Head of government: Prime Minister: Ambrose Mandvulo Dlamini (until October 27), Themba N. Masuku (from December 13)
  - Deputy Prime Minister Themba N. Masuku (since November 6, 2018)

=== Lesotho ===
Lesotho - A country enclaved in South Africa. Basutoland declared its independence from the United Kingdom on October 4, 1966, and became the Kingdom of Lesotho. Today it is a member of the AU, the Commonwealth, the SADC, and the UN. Its capital is Maseru.

- Chief of state: King: Letsie III (from February 7, 1996) (Note: Letsie III previously occupied the throne November 1990 to February 1995 while his father was in exile.)
- Head of government: Prime Minister
  - Tom Thabane (June 16, 2017 to May 19, 2020) (Note: Prime Minister Thabane has declared his intention to resign at the end of July 2020.)
  - Moeketsi Majoro (since May 19, 2020)

=== Namibia ===
Namibia - The Namibian War of Independence led to independence from South Africa on March 21, 1990. Walvis Bay and the Penguin Islands were ceded to the Republic of Namibia in 1994. Namibia is a member of the AU, SADC, and UN. The capital is Windhoek.

- President: Hage Geingob (since March 21, 2015)
  - Vice President: Nangolo Mbumba (since February 12, 2018)
- Prime Minister: Saara Kuugongelwa (since March 21, 2015)
  - Deputy Prime Minister: Netumbo Nandi-Ndaitwah (since March 21, 2015)

=== South Africa ===
South Africa - The Union of South Africa became a self-governing dominion of the British Empire in 1910 and became the Republic of South Africa in 1961. It ended Apartheid and gained majority rule on April 27, 1994. The administrative capital is Pretoria, the legislative capital is Cape Town, and the judicial capital is Bloemfontein.

- President: Cyril Ramaphosa (since February 15, 2018)
  - Deputy President: David Mabuza (February 26, 2018)
- Chief Justice: Mogoeng Mogoeng
- Speaker of the National Assembly: Thandi Modise

== Monthly events ==
=== January and February ===
- January 1 – New Year's Day
- February 3 – A court issues an arrest warrant for former South Africa president Jacob Zuma, 77, on corruption charges. The case will resume on May 6.
- February 5 – German Chancellor Angela Merkel arrives in South Africa to discuss trade, investment, and energy issues.
- February 6 – Lesotho's First Lady, Maesiah Thabane is arrested for murdering her predecessor, Lipolelo Thabane in 2017.
- February 20 – Former prime minister Thomas Thabane, 80, of Lesotho is to be charged with his wife's 2017 murder.

=== March and April ===
- March 11 – Moshoeshoe Day, Lesotho
- March 12 – At least 18 African countries, including South Africa report cases of the novel coronavirus. Most are in single figures, and no deaths have been reported in Sub-Saharan Africa.
- March 14 – Scheduled date for the 2020 DStv Mzansi Viewers' Choice Awards in South Africa
- March 21
  - Independence Day, Namibia
  - Human Rights Day, South Africa
- April 10 – Good Friday, Christian holiday
- April 13
  - Easter Monday, Christian holiday
  - Family Day, South Africa
- April 18 – Prime Minister Thomas Thabane deploys the army to the streets of Lesotho to restore order.
- April 19 – Birthday of King Mswati III, Eswatini
- April 22 – World Health Organization (WHO) warns that the number of malaria deaths in Africa may double this year as efforts to curb the disease wind down.
- April 26 – COVID-19 pandemic: Cuba sends 200 doctors to South Africa.
- April 27 – Freedom Day, South Africa
- April 30 – COVID-19 pandemic: Lesotho is the only African country that has not reported the virus.

=== May and June ===
- May 1 – Labour Day and International Workers' Day
- May 4: Cassinga Day, Namibia
- May 2 – People form lines four kilometers (2.49 miles) long to get food in Olievenhoutbosch, South Africa.
- May 8 – Lesotho Prime Minister Thomas Thabane will step down in July as the country's leader.
- May 13 – COVID-19 pandemic: Lesotho report its first case of the virus, becoming the last country in Africa to do so.
- May 14 – Afrikaans speakers fear the language may be on the way to extinction.
- May 19 – Lesotho's Prime Minister Thomas Thabane resigns. Moeketsi Majoro is sworn in.
- May 25 – Africa Day
- June 3 – Lesotho's former first lady, Maesaiah Thabane, is arrested for the murder of the previous wife of her husband and former prime minister, Thomas Thabane.
- June 8
  - COVID-19 pandemic: South African President Cyril Ramaphosa who says that he's worried that the country's numbers of COVID-19 are rising fast. More than half of South Africa's more than 50,000 confirmed cases and 1,000 deaths have been recorded in the last two weeks.
  - South Africans in Johannesburg, Pretoria, and Cape Town protest the murder of George Floyd of Minneapolis, Minnesota, USA. The protests are also in honor of Collins Khosa, a black South African man who died after allegedly being assaulted by black soldiers enforcing the country's strict lockdown to slow the spread of the coronavirus.
- June 12 – World Day Against Child Labor: The International Labour Organization and the UNICEF warn that millions of children are likely to be pushed into forced labor because of the economic fallout from the COVID-19 pandemic.
- June 16 – Youth Day, South Africa

=== July and August ===
- July 1 – Sir Seretse Khama Day, Botswana
- July 5 – Botswana investigates the mysterious death of between 275 and 356 elephants
- July 17: King's birthday, Lesotho
- July 20: Presidents' Day (Botswana)
- July 22: King Father's birthday, Eswatini
- August 9: National Women's Day (South Africa)
- August 26: Heroes' Day, Namibia

=== September and October ===
- September 7 – The World Food Programme warns of possible hunger in southern Africa, including Zimbabwe, Mozambique, Madagascar, Angola, Lesotho, Esuatini, Zambia, Malawi, and the Democratic Republic of the Congo.

=== November and December ===
- November 15 – Preacher Shepherd Bushiri and his wife skip bail and flee from South Africa to Malawi to avoid a fraud trial.

=== Predicted and scheduled events ===
- September 6: Somhlolo Day (Independence Day, Eswatini)
- September 24: Heritage Day (South Africa)
- September 30: Botswana Day
- October 4: Independence Day, Lesotho
- November TBA: Namibia National council, Regional councils, and local elections
- December 10: Human Rights Day, Namibia
- December 16: Day of Reconciliation, South Africa
- December 20: Incwala (summer solstice), Eswatini
- December 25: Christmas Day, Christian holiday
- December 26: Boxing Day, Commonwealth countries and "Day of Goodwill" in Namibia and South Africa

== Culture ==
=== Television ===
- February 28 – Premier of Queen Sono
- March 14 – 2020 DStv Mzansi Viewers' Choice Awards, Johannesburg
- TBA – Premier of 8th season of Survivor South Africa: Immunity Island

=== Sports ===
- November 29, 2019 to February 1, 2020: 2019–20 CAF Champions League group stage
- December 1, 2019 to February 2, 2020: 2019–20 CAF Confederation Cup group stage
- 17 January to 9 February 2020 ICC Under-19 Cricket World Cup
- 20 to 23 April 2020: 2020 IIHF World Championship Division III, Cape Town, South Africa
- May TBA – Finals of 2020 African U-17 Women's World Cup Qualifying Tournament Began January 2020
- June 21 – Finals of 2020 African U-20 Women's World Cup Qualifying Tournament
- August 8 to September 27: 2020 Rugby Championship, featuring Argentina, Australia, South Africa and New Zealand.
- October 5 to October 12: 2022 FIFA World Cup qualification — CAF second round
- October 13: 2020 MEA Rugby League Championship, Pretoria, South Africa

== Deaths ==
=== January to March ===
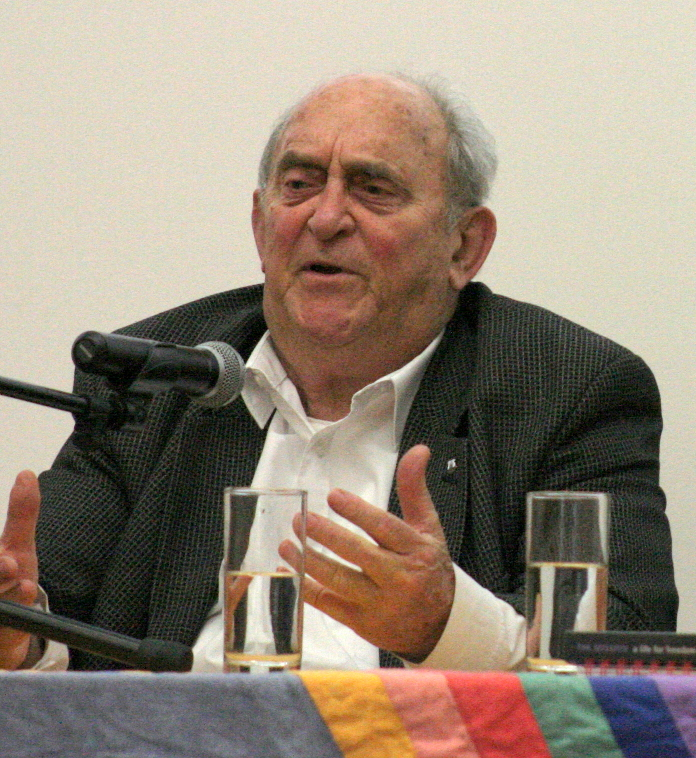
Denis Goldberg

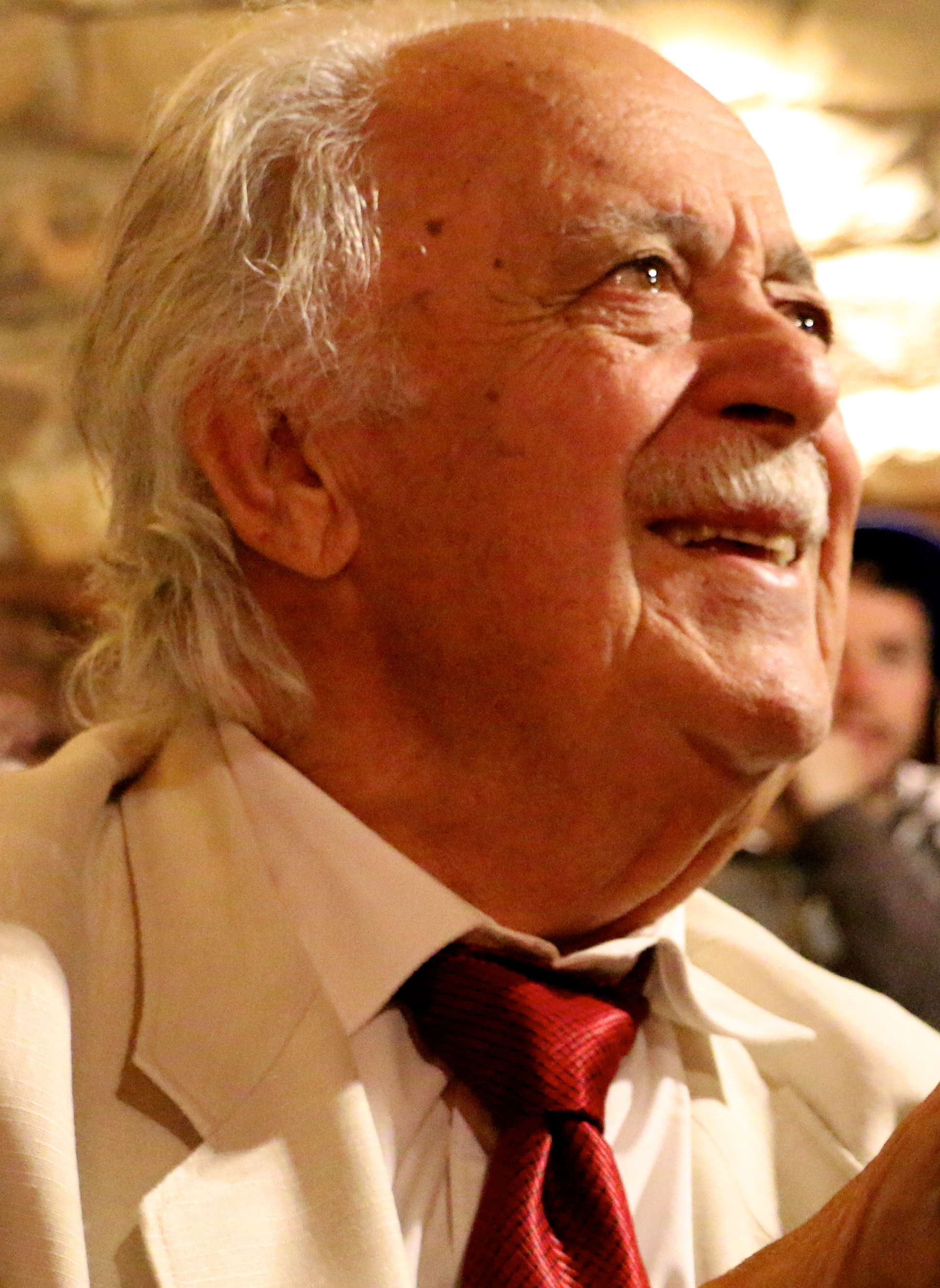
George Bizos

- January 6 – Richard Maponya, 99, South African entrepreneur and property developer (b. 1920).
- January 18 – Peter Mathebula, South African WBA flyweight champion boxer (b. 1952).
- January 20 – Bicks Ndoni, South African politician (b. 1958).
- January 26 – Santu Mofokeng, 64, South African photographer; progressive supranuclear palsy
- 7 February – Harold Strachan, 94, South African writer and anti-apartheid activist.
- February 11 – Joseph Shabalala, 78, founder of Ladysmith Black Mambazo
- February 20 – Zoe Gail, 100, South African-born British singer and actress (No Orchids for Miss Blandish).
- February 26 – Clinton Marius, 53, South African writer and performer
- March 21 – Sol Kerzner, 84, South African hotelier, founder of Southern Sun Hotel Group and Sun International, cancer.
- March 25 – Vusamazulu Credo Mutwa, 98, South African traditional healer and conspiracy theorist
- March 31 – Gita Ramjee, 63, South African HIV prevention researcher; COVID-19.

=== April to June ===
- April 1 – Harold Rubin, 87, South African-born Israeli jazz clarinettist.
- April 3
  - Hans Meyer, 94, South African actor (Colditz)
  - Constand Viljoen, 86, South African military officer and politician, MP (1994–2001)
- April 29 – Denis Goldberg, 87, South African lawyer and political activist (Rivonia Trial); lung cancer
- May 4 – Cedric Xulu, 80, South African footballer (AmaZulu F.C.), cancer.
- May 11 – Ewie Cronje, 80, South African cricketer.
- 12 May - Clarence Mini, 68, South African doctor, anti-apartheid fighter, COVID-19.
- May 19 – Mary-Anne Plaatjies van Huffel, 60, South African pastor and academic; complications from surgery
- June 2 – Jeanne Goosen, 81, South African writer.
- June 12 – Kirvan Fortuin, 28, South African dancer, choreographer and LGBTQI activist; stabbed.
- June 14 – Elsa Joubert, 97, South African Sestigers writer, COVID-19.

=== July to September ===
- July 13 – Zindzi Mandela, 59, South African diplomat and poet, daughter of Nelson Mandela
- July 21 – Andrew Mlangeni, 95, politician, anti-Apartheid activist and the last Rivonia Trialst.
- July 22 – Theo Diergaardt, 50, Namibian politician.
- July 24 – Bernard Mohlalisi, 87, Lesothan Roman Catholic prelate, Archbishop of Maseru (1990–2009).
- August 6 – John Nkadimeng, 93, South African politician and anti-Apartheid activist.
- August 26 – Dirk Mudge, 92, Namibian politician; COVID-19.
- 9 September – George Bizos, 92, South African human rights lawyer (Rivonia Trial) and anti-apartheid activist.

=== October to December ===
- November 11 – Thembekile Kimi Makwetu, 54, South African accountant, Auditor-General (since 2013); lung cancer.
- December 13 – Ambrose Mandvulo Dlamini, Prime Minister of Eswatini; COVID-19.

== See also ==
- 2020–21 South-West Indian Ocean cyclone season
- African Union
- Commonwealth of Nations
- Southern African Development Community
- COVID-19 pandemic in Africa
- 2020 in East Africa
- 2020 in Middle Africa
- 2020 in North Africa
- 2020 in South Africa
- 2020 in West Africa
- 2020 in politics and government
- 2020s
- 2020s in political history
- List of deaths due to COVID-19
- List of sovereign states and dependent territories in Africa
- List of George Floyd protests outside the United States
