= List of COVID-19 deaths in South Africa =

Deaths in South Africa from COVID-19

This is a list of notable people who are reported to have died either from coronavirus disease 2019 (COVID-19) or post COVID-19 (long COVID) in South Africa, as a result of infection by the virus SARS-CoV-2 during the COVID-19 pandemic and post-COVID-19 pandemic.

== List ==
Date	Name	Sex	Age	Notability	Place of death	Ref.
31 March 2020	Gita Ramjee	F	63	Scientist and researcher in HIV prevention.	KwaZulu-Natal, Umhlanga	
9 April 2020	Charles Maja	M	53–54	Affectionately known by his teledrama role Big Boy, was a South African actor	Limpopo	
12 May 2020	Clarence Mini	M	68	Chairperson of the Council of Medical Schemes, uMkhonto we Sizwe, AIDS activist	Gauteng, Johannesburg	
13 May 2020	Dora Dunana Dlamini	F	57	Member of the National Assembly		
14 June 2020	Elsa Joubert	F	97	Author	Western Cape, Cape Town	
28 June 2020	Gordon Kegakilwe	M	53	North West MEC for Cooperative Governance, Human Settlement and Traditional Affairs	Gauteng, Klerksdorp	
7 July 2020	Henry Jansen	M	64	Mayor of Langeberg	Western Cape, Worcester	
8 July 2020	Ricardo Mthembu	M	49–50	Member of the KwaZulu-Natal Legislature and ANC provincial spokesperson	KwaZulu-Natal, KwaDukuza	
8 July 2020	Queen Noloyiso Sandile	F	56–57	Regent of the AmaRharhabe	Eastern Cape, Mdantsane	
10 July 2020	Corra Dirksen	M	82	Springboks rugby player	Gauteng, Klerksdorp	
10 July 2020	Thomas Manthata	M	80	Anti-Apartheid activist (Delmas Treason Trial)	Gauteng, Thaba Tshwane	
12 July 2020	Alfred Mtsi	M	69–70	Mayor of Buffalo City (2015–2016)	Eastern Cape, East London	
13 July 2020	Zindzi Mandela	F	59	Daughter of Nelson Mandela.	Gauteng, Johannesburg	
18 July 2020	Moonyeenn Lee	F	76	Casting director and talent agent	Gauteng, Johannesburg	
18 July 2020	Martha Mmola	F		Delegate of the National Council of Provinces		
19 July 2020	Zamuxolo Peter	M	55	Member of the National Assembly of South Africa		
7 August 2020	Lungile Pepeta	M	45–46	Paediatric cardiologist. Dean of health sciences at Nelson Mandela University.	Eastern Cape, Port Elizabeth	
12 August 2020	Mac Jack	M	55	Northern Cape MEC for Education.	Northern Cape, Kimberley	
18 August 2020	Mongameli Bobani	M	52	Former Mayor of the Nelson Mandela Bay Metropolitan Municipality	Eastern Cape, Port Elizabeth	
26 October 2020	David Bloomberg	M	~88	Former Mayor of Cape Town	Western Cape, Cape Town	
22 November 2020	Mncedisi Filtane	M	73	Member of the Eastern Cape Provincial Legislature		
7 December 2020	Dawn Lindberg	F	75	Entertainer	Western Cape, Plettenberg Bay	
7 December 2020	Pumza Dyantyi	F	72	Eastern Cape MEC for Social Development	Eastern Cape Province	
9 December 2020	Gordon Forbes	M	86	Tennis player	Western Cape, Plettenberg Bay	
13 December 2020	Ambrose Mandvulo Dlamini	M	52	Prime Minister of Eswatini	Gauteng, Milpark	
25 December 2020	Robin Jackman	M	75	Cricketer and radio/TV commentator	Western Cape, Cape Town	
25 December 2020	Patrick Bayo Mkhize	M	60	Black Consciousness Movement, general secretary of the Transport Retail and General Workers' Union	KwaZulu-Natal, Durban	
26 December 2020	Aubrey Mokoape	M	76	Anti-apartheid activist	KwaZulu-Natal, Durban	
26 December 2020	Nomvuzo Shabalala	F	60	Member of the National Assembly		
5 January 2021	Mluleki George	M	72	Politician, sports administrator	Eastern Cape, East London	
9 January 2021	Johnson Mlambo	M	81	Politician	Gauteng, Johannesburg	
13 January 2021	Bheki Ntuli	M	63	KwaZulu-Natal MEC for Transport, Community Safety & Liaison	KwaZulu-Natal, Durban	
17 January 2021	Abel Gabuza	M	65	Archbishop Coadjutor of the Archdiocese of Durban	KwaZulu-Natal, Durban	
17 January 2021	Marius Swart	M	79	Executive Mayor of the George Local Municipality and Member of the National Assembly of South Africa	Western Cape, George	
18 January 2021	Nombulelo Hermans	F	51	Member of the National Assembly of South Africa		
21 January 2021	Jackson Mthembu	M	62	Minister in the Presidency of South Africa's government, and parliamentarian for the African National Congress (ANC)	Gauteng, Johannesburg	
22 January 2021	Marius van Heerden	M	46	Former SA 800 metres record holder and Olympian	Western Cape, Cape Town	
28 January 2021	Kenneth Mthiyane	M	76	Justice of the Supreme Court of Appeal of South Africa	Western Cape, Cape Town	
29 January 2021	Percy Tucker	M	92	Ticket booking agent, launched the world's first computerized theatre reservation system in 1971	Western Cape, Cape Town	
31 January 2021	Tozama Mantashe	F	60	Member of the National Assembly of South Africa (since 2014)		
4 February 2021	Zwelifile Christopher Ntuli	M		Member of the KwaZulu-Natal Legislature and member of the National Assembly of South Africa		
4 March 2021	Karima Brown	F	54	Senior South African journalist	Gauteng, Johannesburg	
12 March 2021	Goodwill Zwelethini kaBhekuzulu	M	72	The King of the Zulu nation	KwaZulu-Natal, Durban	
4 April 2021	Frank Mdlalose	M	89	Political activist and the first Premier of KwaZulu-Natal	KwaZulu-Natal, Durban	
10 April 2021	Sindisiwe van Zyl	F	45	Former Kaya FM presenter, medical doctor and life coach	Gauteng, Johannesburg	
22 April 2021	Jacqueline Mofokeng	F	61	South African politician, African National Congress member in the Gauteng Provincial Legislature	Gauteng, Johannesburg	
19 May 2021	Tshoganetso Tongwane	F	65	Member of the National Assembly of South Africa		
26 May 2021	Ben Kruger	M	64	Actor, author	Gauteng, Pretoria	
11 June 2021	Taha Karaan	M	52	Islamic scholar	Western Cape, Cape Town	
15 June 2021	James Jim Skosana	M	59	Member of the Mpumalanga Provincial Legislature, member of the National Assembly of South Africa		
16 June 2021	Jabu Mabuza	M	63	Businessperson and investor		
29 June 2021	Goolam Rajah	M	74	Manager of the South Africa national cricket team, pharmacist	Gauteng, Johannesburg	
30 June 2021	Richard Dolley	M	61	Cricketer, educator, and hockey administrator		
1 July 2021	Steve Kekana	M	62	Singer and songwriter		
2 July 2021	Lehlo Ledwaba	M	49	Boxer	Gauteng, Johannesburg	
3 July 2021	Alfred Diratsagae Kganare	M	50	Member of the National Assembly of South Africa	Gauteng, Johannesburg	
7 July 2021	Cameron Mackenzie	M	60	Member of the National Assembly of South Africa	Gauteng, Johannesburg	
9 July 2021	Geoff Makhubo	M	53	Mayor of Johannesburg	Gauteng, Johannesburg	
July 2021	Lesego Semenya	M	39	Celebrity chef		
12 July 2021	Ben Ngubane	M	79	Ambassador to Japan, Minister of Arts and Culture, Premier of KwaZulu-Natal and member of the National Assembly of South Africa	KwaZulu-Natal, Richards Bay	
16 July 2021	Joyce Maluleke	F	60	Member of the National Assembly of South Africa (since 2015)		
21 July 2021	Lieb Bester	M	72	Actor	Gauteng, Pretoria	
22 July 2021	Andre Thysse	M	52	Boxer, boxing promoter		
22 July 2021	Ian Palmer	M	55	Soccer player, coach		
23 July 2021	Lulama Ntshayisa	M	62	Member of the National Assembly of South Africa (since 2014)		
30 July 2021	Shona Ferguson	M	47	Actor and producer	Gauteng, Johannesburg	
31 July 2021	Jacobus Frederick van Wyk	M	69	Member of the Northern Cape Provincial Legislature (2004–2013) and Member of the National Assembly of South Africa (1997–2004)	Northern Cape, Steinkopf	
23 August 2021	Giovanni Pretorius	M	49	Olympic boxer		
3 September 2021	John Watkins	M	98	Cricketer	KwaZulu-Natal, Durban	
6 September 2021	Zanele kaMagwaza-Msibi	F	59	Politician, leader of the National Freedom Party	KwaZulu-Natal, Durban	
11 October 2021	Ockert Potgieter	M	55	Missionary in Ukraine, Film Director	Western Cape, Mossel Bay	
4 December 2021	Dewa Mavhinga	M		Southern African Director of Human Rights Watch		
6 January 2022	Cyril George	M	74	Politician		
24 January 2022	Butana Komphela	M	66	Politician	Bloemfontein, Free State	

== See also ==
- Deaths in 2020
- Deaths in 2021
- Deaths in 2022
- List of deaths due to COVID-19
