= South East Academic Libraries System =

Library cooperative in South Africa (e. 1999)

South East Academic Library System
- Formation: 1999
- Type: Public Beneifit organization
- Headquarters: Nelson Mandela University
- Location: South Africa
- Members: 4 tertiary institutions
- SEALS Trust and Systems Manager: Allwright, Maretha
- Key people: Dr Peter Clayton, SEALS Trust Chairperson
- Website: www.seals.ac.za

The South African South East Academic Libraries System, commonly known as SEALS, was conceptualized in 1998 as a regional library cooperative, and fully constituted in 1999 as a regional consortium, under the auspices of the Eastern Cape Higher Education Association (ECHEA) in South Africa.

== Purpose ==
“The vision of SEALS is to create a virtual library for the Eastern Cape to promote and enhance information literacy, education, research, and economic development for all who need it.”.

== History ==
At various stages since 1992, higher educational consortia were formed to foster collaboration between the various previously disparate tertiary institutions. One of these consortia was the Eastern Cape Higher Education Association (ECHEA). These consortia aimed at consolidation efforts in increasing capacity and value within the regions. In this regard academic library consortia were established, with the South East Academic Libraries System (SEALS) cooperative of specific interest to the Eastern Cape region.

The original consortium member institutions were the library services of the eight tertiary institutions in the Eastern Cape, including: Fort Hare, Port Elizabeth Technikon, Border Technikon, Vista University, Eastern Cape Technikon, Rhodes University, University of Port Elizabeth, and the University of Transkei. Although established in 1998, the consortium was formally recognised as an academic library consortium in 1999, The Andrew W. Mellon Foundation endowed funds to SEALS in 2000 to implement a single shared library management system for all member institutions within SEALS.

In 2004 the higher education environment in South Africa was restructured, realigning the previously advantaged and disadvantaged institutions. Some of the eight member institutions of the SEALS consortium merged to form the Walter Sisulu University, Rhodes University, the Nelson Mandela Metropolitan University and the University of Fort Hare.
