= Thandeka =

Thandeka is a feminine given name.

People with the name include:

- Thandeka (minister) (born 1946), American Unitarian Universalist minister and theologian
- Thandeka Mbabama (born 1956), South African politician
- Thandeka Mdeliswa (1986–2020), South African actress
- Thandeka Zulu (born 1991), South African actress and musician
