= Gobodo =

Gobodo is a surname. Notable people with the surname include:

- Nonkululeko Gobodo (born 1960), South African accountant
- Pumla Gobodo-Madikizela (born 1955), South African academic
