= Makwetu =

Makwetu is a surname. Notable people with the surname include:

- Clarence Makwetu (1928–2016), South African anti-apartheid activist and politician
- Thembekile Kimi Makwetu (died 2020), Auditor-General of South Africa
