= Lungile Pepeta =

South African doctor

- Born: 1974; Bizana, Transkei
- Died: 7 August 2020 (aged 45–46); Life St George's Hospital, Gqeberha, Eastern Cape
- Resting place: Bizana, Eastern Cape, South Africa
- Education: Walter Sisulu University
- Occupations: Paediatric cardiologist, medical researcher, educator
- Known for: Human rights activism

Lungile Pepeta (1974 – 7 August 2020) was a South African paediatric cardiologist, medical researcher, university professor and activist who also served as the chairperson of the Council of Medical Schemes. Doctor Pepeta was regarded as one of the pioneers of the medical industry in South Africa especially for his crucial contributions regarding child health care. He also served as the executive dean in the faculty of Health Sciences at Nelson Mandela University and was the former head of the paediatric department and paediatric cardiology at Dora Nginza Hospital.

== Biography ==
Lungile Pepeta was born and raised in Bizana, in the former Transkei, where he spent most of his life.

== Career ==
In 1997, Pepeta completed his Bachelor of Medicine, Bachelor of Surgery at the Walter Sisulu University and obtained his diploma in child health care in 1999. He also completed a Master of medicine in Paediatrics from the University of Witwatersrand and was a fellowship holder of the Society for Cardiovascular Angiography and Interventions.

He qualified as a paediatrician in 2003, specialising in the field of paediatric cardiology since 2008. In 2009, he established Port Elizabeth's first paediatric cardiology unit at the provincial Dora Nginza Hospital and was appointed as head of the paediatrics department at Dora Nginza in 2010. He also introduced non-invasive procedures to cure the heart disorders and defects such as congenital heart disorder faced by children in the Eastern Cape. He also mentored and trained many doctors, especially related to the field of paediatrics.

In January 2017, he joined the faculty of Health Sciences at the Nelson Mandela University in Port Elizabeth and became the executive dean of the faculty. He also became a member of the Council of Medical Schemes in November 2017.

In June 2020, he was elected as the chairperson of the Council of Medical Schemes, eventually replacing Clarence Mini who died on 12 May 2020 due to COVID-19. He was also roped in as a member of a 15-member jury panel of experts advising the committee to the provincial government's COVID-19 taskforce.

== Death ==
Pepeta was hospitalized at the Life St George's Hospital in June 2020, and was later revealed to have contracted COVID-19. He died on 7 August 2020, from COVID-19 complications at the age of 46 during the COVID-19 pandemic in South Africa. Until his death, he served as chairman of CMS as well as the executive dean at Nelson Mandela University. He was pursuing a PhD in paediatrics from the University of Stellenbosch prior to his death.

The funeral was held with category 2 special official provincial respect on 12 August 2020, in Bizana.
