= Hanno Dirksen =

South African rugby union player

- Born: Willem Johannes Dirksen; 31 March 1990 (age 36) Krugersdorp, South Africa
- Height: 183 cm (6 ft 0 in)
- Weight: 97 kg (15 st 4 lb; 214 lb)
- School: Truro College
- Notable relative: Corra Dirksen (uncle)

Rugby union career
- Position: Wing
Senior career
Years	Team	Apps	(Points)
2009–2012	Swansea RFC	31	(132)
2009–2020	Ospreys	151	(195)
2021	NOLA Gold	12	(10)
2021–	Swansea RFC	30	(17)
- Correct as of 24 December 2022
International career
Years	Team	Apps	(Points)
- United States U18

Hanno Dirksen is a South African rugby union player currently playing for NOLA Gold of Major League Rugby (MLR).

He was a regular member of the Ospreys squad during the 2011–12 Pro12 winning season, and earned the award of try of the season for his score against Edinburgh in February 2012. On 20th June 2024

== Early life ==
Dirksen grew up in the United States in Nashville, Tennessee, where he attended Lassiter High School (Marietta, GA), and played for the USA U17 and U18 national rugby union teams. Dirksen went to the UK on a student visa in 2008 to study at Truro College, before transferring to Neath Port Talbot College in 2009. During his time at Truro College he played regularly for St Ives RFC and became a scoring machine, with St Ives lifting the County cup. Due to his student visa, he played as an amateur at Swansea RFC and Ospreys until he signed a professional contract with the Ospreys in January 2011.

== Professional career ==
=== Ospreys ===
Dirksen made his debut for Ospreys in November 2009 against Bath Rugby and scored his first try for the region in February 2010 against Leeds Carnegie in his only other appearance in the 2009–10 season. Dirksen featured for Ospreys 5 times during the 2010–11 season, scoring once. During the 2011–12 season Dirksen scored 8 tries for Ospreys in 24 matches.

Dirksen's Ospreys career was punctuated by injuries, and faced competition with other Welsh wing contenders.

Dirksen officially departed the club in 2021, after more than ten seasons, winning the league in 2012.

=== Major League Rugby ===
Dirksen signed to play with NOLA Gold in March 2021 for the 2021 Major League Rugby season. He played for NOLA Gold on 12 occasions, scoring two tries.

=== Return to Wales ===
After one season in the United States, Dirksen returned to Wales ahead of the 2021–22 Indigo Group Premiership, once more playing for Swansea RFC.

== International career ==
Although, Dirksen represented the United States under-18 side, he never was capped by the national side and is no longer eligible under World Rugby regulations. During his time with Ospreys he became eligible to play for Wales and in 2014 expressed interest in playing for the nation.

Dirksen never attained a Welsh cap, with injuries unfortunately sidelining him throughout his career.

== Family ==
Dirksen has two rugby internationals in his family. His brother Cornelius made his debut for the USA in the 2012 International Rugby Series, and their uncle Corra Dirksen won 10 South Africa caps in the 1960s.
