= Sugar Ray Xulu Stadium =

Multi-purpose stadium in Clermont, South Africa

- Interactive map of Sugar Ray Xulu Stadium
- Location: Clermont, Durban, South Africa
- Coordinates: 29°48′06″S 30°53′46″E
- Owner: City of Durban
- Capacity: 6,500

Construction
- Renovated: 2010
- Cost: R73 million (2009 refurbishment)

Sugar Ray Xulu Stadium is a multi-purpose stadium in Clermont, a township of Durban, South Africa. It is used mostly for football matches and was selected as one of the 3 training venues of the 2010 FIFA World Cup after being renovated in 2010 and brought up to FIFA standards.

The stadium's capacity was expanded from 1,700 to 6,500 as a lasting legacy of the World Cup.

The stadium is named after Cedric 'Sugar Ray' Xulu, a footballer considered a living legend in Durban whose career in the 1960s led him to play for local side AmaZulu and Mbabane Swallows in Swaziland.
