= Terence Nombembe =

Terence Mncedisi Nombembe (born 30 September 1961 in Qumbu, Eastern Cape) is a qualified Chartered accountant who served as Auditor General of South Africa from 2006 to 2013. During his tenure as Auditor General, Nombembe gained a reputation for integrity. An outspoken critic of corruption, he has been called the commercial equivalent of former Public Protector Advocate Thuli Madonsela. In August 2017, Nombembe was re-appointed as Non-Executive Director of the South African Reserve Bank. He is currently the chief executive officer of the South African Institute of Chartered Accountants.

Nombembe matriculated at the Umtata Technical College in 1979. In 1982, Nombembe obtained his Bachelor of Commerce degree from the University of Transkei. In 1986, Nombembe completed his Bachelor of Accounting Science (Honours) degree at the University of South Africa. Nombembe was conferred with an Honorary Doctorate in Accounting Science from the Walter Sisulu University in 2014.

Nombembe is married to Nokwanda and has three children, Mphiwa, Fezekile and Kamvalethu.
