= Tsakani Maluleke =

South African chartered accountant

Auditor-General of South Africa
- Incumbent
- Assumed office 1 December 2020
- Appointed by: Cyril Ramaphosa
- Preceded by: Thembekile Kimi Makwetu

Deputy Auditor-General of South Africa
- In office 2014 – 1 December 2020

Personal details
- Born: 1975 or 1976 (age 50–51) Soshanguve, Transvaal Province, South Africa
- Education: University of Cape Town (BCom, PGDA); University of the Witwatersrand (PDM)
- Profession: Chartered accountant

Tsakani Maluleke (born 1975 or 1976) is a South African chartered accountant who has been the Auditor-General of South Africa since December 2020, the first woman to hold the office. She had previously served as the deputy auditor-general.

== Early life and education ==
Maluleke was born and grew up in the Soshanguve township, north of Pretoria. She has two sisters, Refilwe and Basani. She matriculated from the St Andrew's School for Girls, a private school in Senderwood, Johannesburg. Maluleke studied at the University of Cape Town, graduating from with a Bachelor of Commerce in Accountancy in 1996 and a Post-Graduate Diploma in Accounting in 1997. In 2016, she graduated from the University of the Witwatersrand with a Post-Graduate Diploma in Development and Public Management.

== Career ==
Maluleke completed her articles at PwC. In 2001, she was a registered auditor and chartered accountant CA(SA). Maluleke worked as a transactor at Worldwide Capital between 2001 and 2002, when she became business finance manager at the Eastern Cape Development Corporation. From 2004 to 2010, she worked as a finance director at Izingwe Holdings.

She was president and a non-executive board member of Association for the Advancement of Black Accountants from 2006 until 2010. Maluleke was named acting chief executive officer of the Energy and Water Sector Education and Training Authority (SETA) in 2010 before becoming an auditing partner at Deloitte in January 2012.

In June 2012, she joined the office of the auditor-general of South Africa as the national leader of audit services. She was named the deputy auditor-general and the chief executive officer of the office of the auditor-general in 2014, becoming the first woman to hold the role.

Maluleke also served on the Presidential Black Economic Empowerment Advisory Council as well as non-executive chair of the board of the South African Institute of Chartered Accountants.

== Auditor-general of South Africa ==
On 20 October 2020, the ad-hoc parliamentary committee on appointing the next auditor-general unanimously recommended Maluleke to replace Thembekile Kimi Makwetu, whose non-renewable term was nearly complete. On 27 October 2020, the National Assembly also unanimously resolved to recommend Maluleke for appointment as the next Auditor-General. President Cyril Ramaphosa officially appointed her on 20 November 2020 and she assumed office on 1 December 2020. She is the first woman to hold the role.

== Personal life ==
Maluleke's two sisters, Basani and Refilwe, are both businesswomen. Basani was the first black woman to serve as chief executive officer of a commercial bank in South Africa, when she was CEO of African Bank, while Refilwe holds a senior position at Discovery.

Maluleke has two children. She speaks every official language of South Africa, with the exception of the Venda language.
