= Walter Sisulu University =

University in South Africa

- Walter Sisulu Universiteit (Afrikaans)
- Former names: Border Technikon, Eastern Cape Technikon and University of Transkei
- Motto: In pursuit of excellence
- Established: 1 July 2005; 21 years ago
- Chairperson: Advocate Tembeka Ngcukaitobi
- Chancellor: Nonkululeko Gobodo
- Vice-Chancellor: Dr. Thandi Mgwebi
- Students: 31,500
- Undergraduates: Yes
- Postgraduates: Yes
- Location: Mthatha, Butterworth, East London & Komani (Queenstown), Eastern Cape, South Africa; 31°36′12″S 28°45′02″E
- Campus: 4 campuses - Mthatha, East London (Buffalo City), Butterworth, Komani (Queenstown)
- Colours: Black; White
- Nickname: WSU
- Website: www.wsu.ac.za

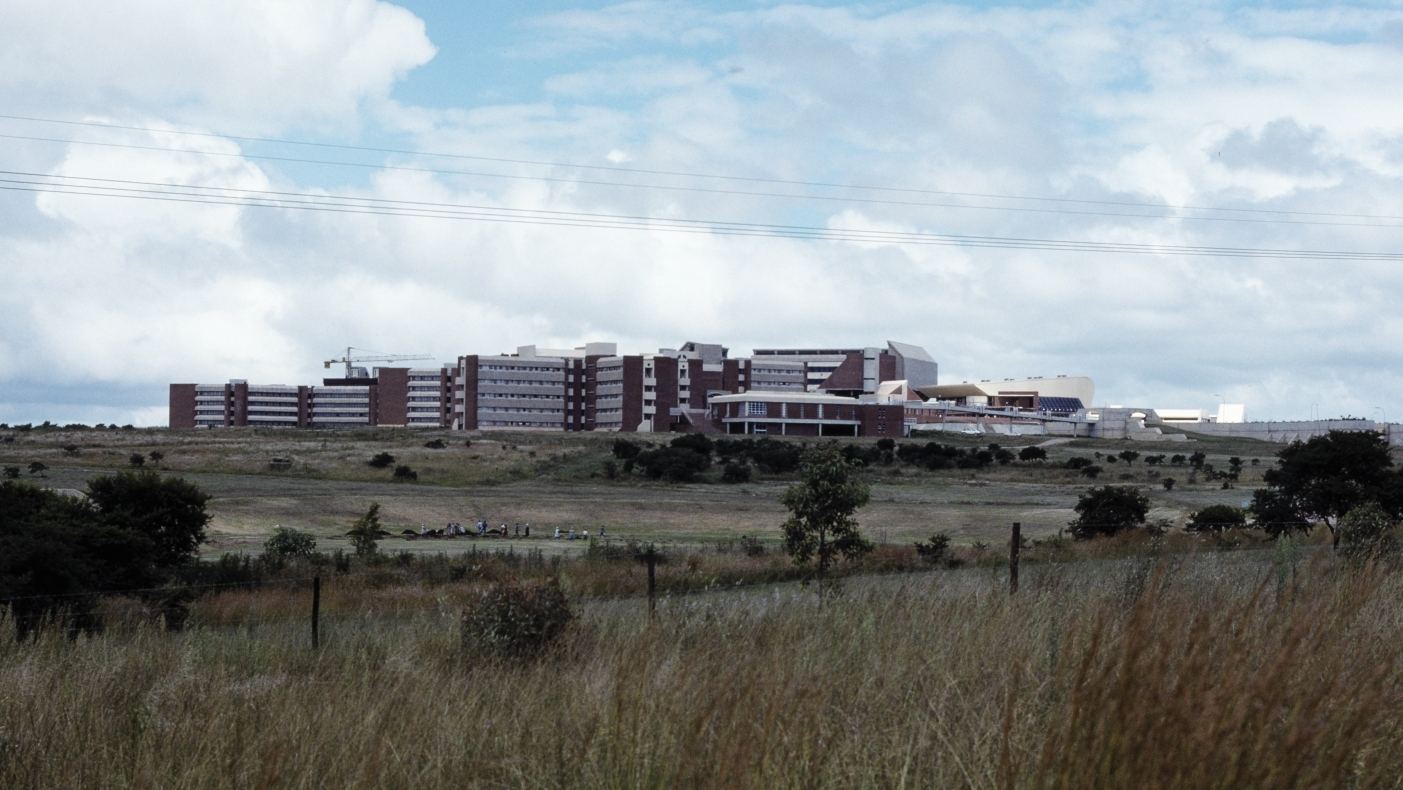
Mthatha Campus

Walter Sisulu University (WSU) is a university of technology and science located in Mthatha, East London (Buffalo City), Butterworth and Komani (Queenstown) in the Eastern Cape, South Africa. It came into existence on 1 July 2005 as a result of a merger between Border Technikon, Eastern Cape Technikon and the University of Transkei. The university is named after Walter Sisulu, a prominent figure in the struggle against apartheid.

== History ==
The University of the Transkei was established in the homeland of that name in 1976, initially as a branch of the University of Fort Hare at the request of the homeland government. The Border Technikon and Eastern Cape Technikon were established in the late 1980s and early 1990s.In 2026 the university has changed into new brand.

== Notes ==
As one of the comprehensive universities in South Africa, WSU is a developmental university, focusing on urban renewal and rural development by responding to the socio-economic needs of community, commerce and industry through science, technology and innovation.

== Administration and organisation ==
The university is organised by campus and then by faculty:

- Buffalo City (East London)
  - Faculty of Science, Engineering and Technology
  - Faculty of Business Sciences
- Butterworth
  - Faculty of Engineering and Technology
  - Faculty of Business Sciences
  - Faculty of Education
- Komani (Queenstown)
  - Faculty of Education and School Development
  - Faculty of Economics and Information Technology Systems
- Mthatha
  - Faculty of Health Sciences
  - Faculty of Educational Sciences
  - Faculty of Humanities, Social Sciences and Law
  - Faculty of Natural Sciences
  - Faculty of Commerce and Administrations

== Academic programs ==
The university's 175 academic programmes are fully accredited by the Council on Higher Education which monitors higher education quality across South Africa. In addition, many of the programs are also accredited by their respective professional bodies. There are programs offered in the following fields:

- Engineering - Mechanical Engineering, Electrical Engineering, Civil Engineering, Built Environment etc.
- Science
- Health
- Information Technology
- Business Management
- Education
- Fashion and Art
- Journalism and Broadcasting
- Tourism and Hospitality Management

== Notable alumni ==
- Terence Nombembe CA (SA), Auditor-General of South Africa from 2006 to 2013 (B.Com 1982)
- Nonkululeko Gobodo CA(SA), first black female CA (SA) (B.Com)
- Nomgcobo Jiba, advocate, first Deputy National Director of Public Prosecutions
- Tembeka Nicholas Ngcukaitobi, lawyer, public speaker, author and political activist.
- Mandisa Muriel Lindelwa, first female President of the Supreme Court of Appeal
- Lwazi Lushaba, intellectual
- Lungile Pepeta, paediatric cardiologist, medical researcher, university professor and activist
- Ncumisa Jilata, neurosurgeon
