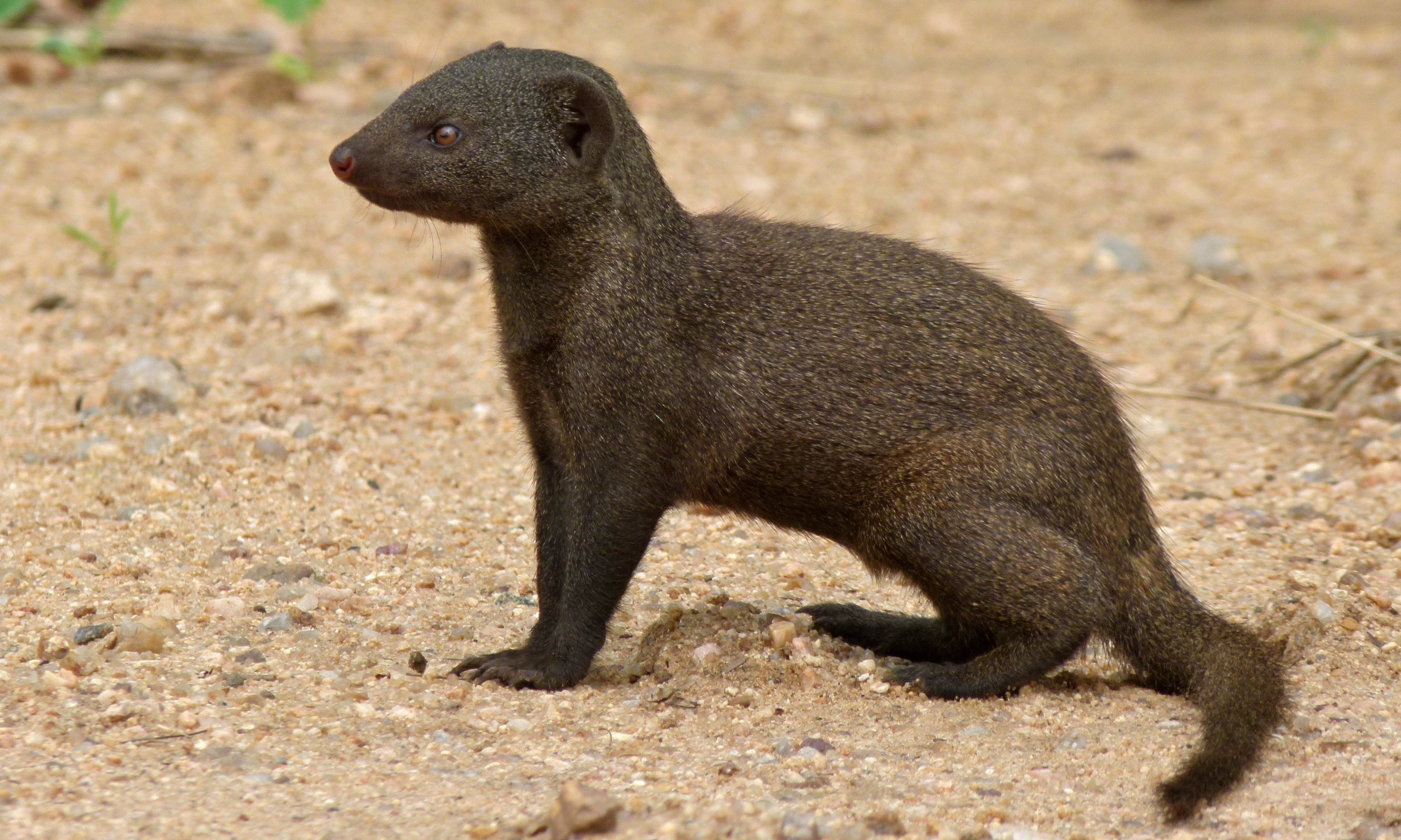
- in Kruger National Park

Conservation status
- Least Concern (IUCN 3.1)

Scientific classification
- Kingdom: Animalia
- Phylum: Chordata
- Class: Mammalia
- Order: Carnivora
- Family: Herpestidae
- Genus: Helogale
- Species: H. parvula

Binomial name
- Helogale parvula Sundevall, 1847
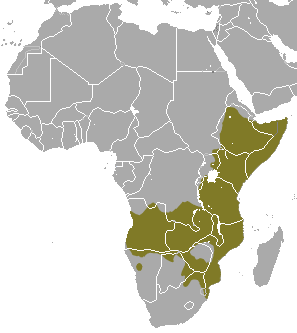
- native range

= Common dwarf mongoose =

Species of mongoose from Africa

The common dwarf mongoose (Helogale parvula) is a mongoose species native to Angola, northern Botswana, northern Namibia, KwaZulu-Natal in South Africa, Zambia and East Africa. It is part of the genus Helogale, along with the Ethiopian dwarf mongoose.

== Characteristics ==
The common dwarf mongoose has soft fur ranging from yellowish red to very dark brown. It has a large pointed head, small ears, a long tail, short limbs and long claws. With a body length of 16–23 cm (6.3–9.1 in) and a weight of 213–341 g (7.5–12.0 oz), it is Africa's smallest member of the order Carnivora.

== Distribution and habitat ==
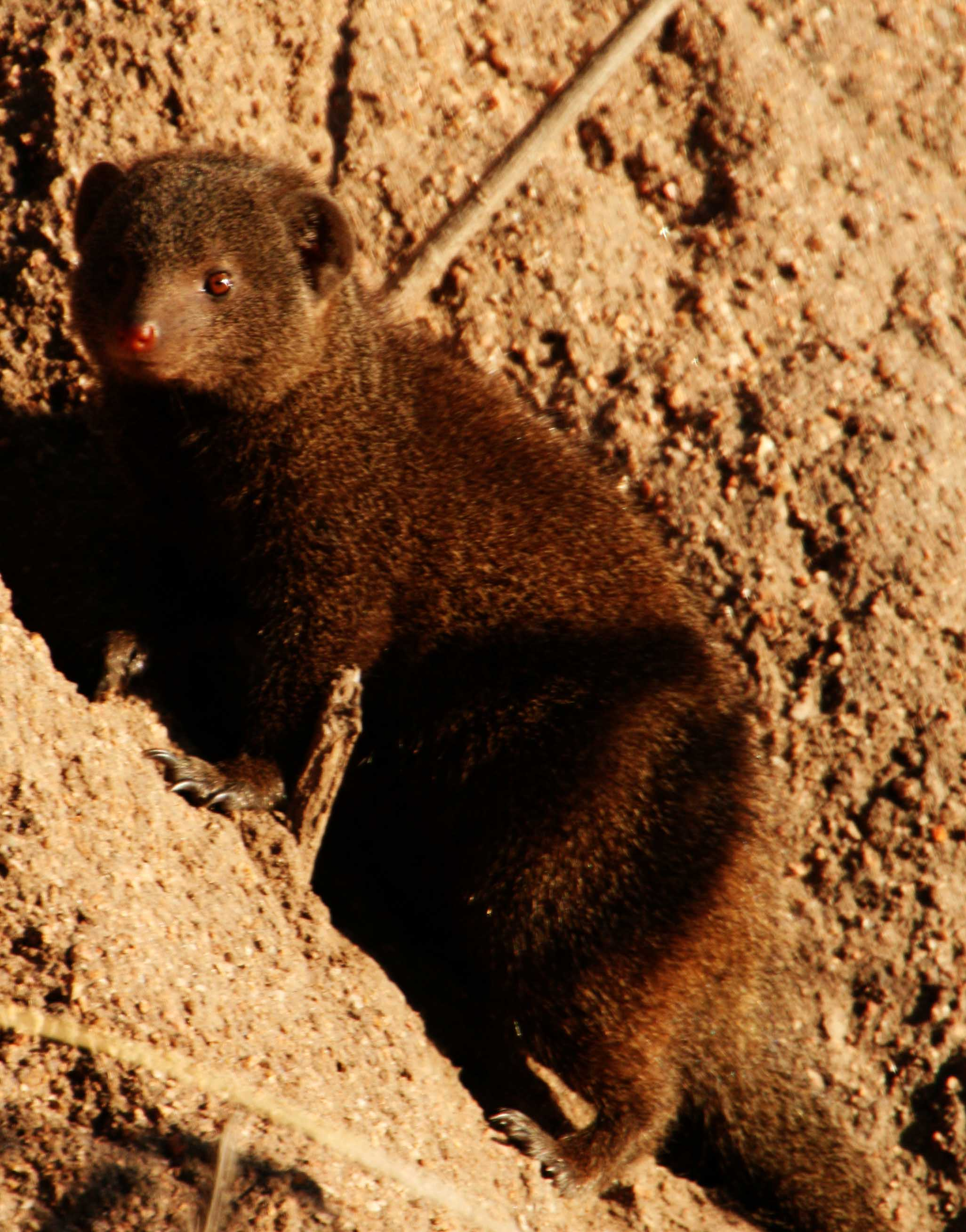
Common dwarf mongoose in the Sabi Sand Game Reserve, South Africa

The common dwarf mongoose ranges from East to southern Central Africa, from Eritrea and Ethiopia to the provinces of Limpopo and Mpumalanga in the Republic of South Africa. It inhabits primarily dry grassland, open forests and bushland up to an elevation of 2,000 m (6,600 ft). It is especially common in areas with many termite mounds, its favorite sleeping place. It avoids dense forests and deserts.

== Subspecies ==
- Helogale parvula parvula
- Helogale parvula ivori
- Helogale parvula mimetra
- Helogale parvula nero
- Helogale parvula ruficeps
- Helogale parvula undulatus
- Helogale parvula varia

== Behaviour and ecology ==
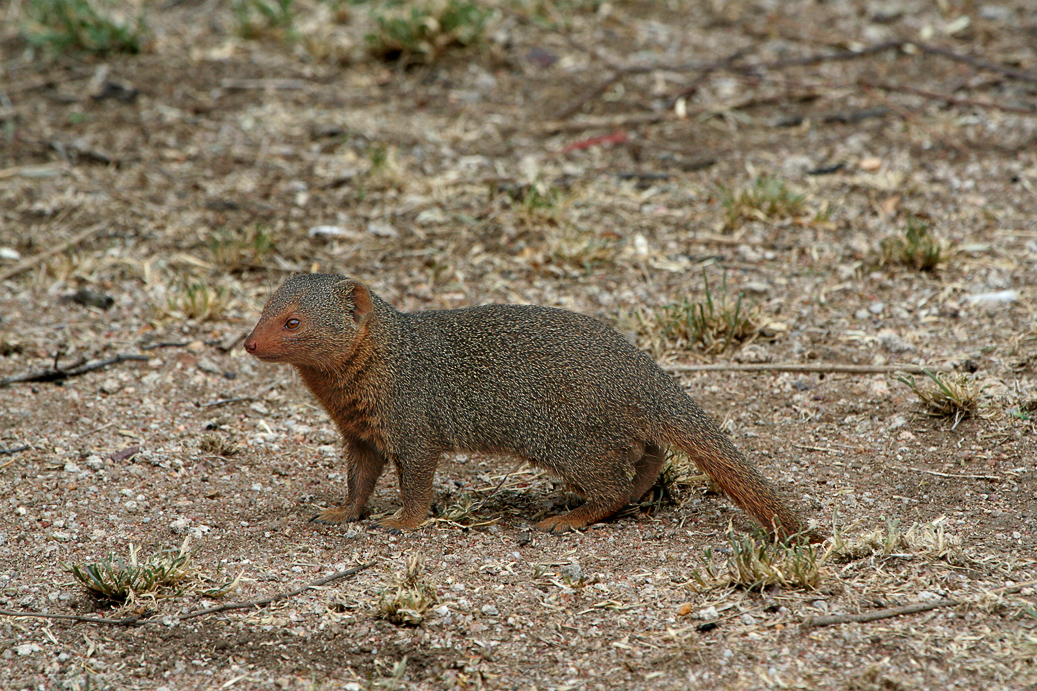
In the Serengeti

The common dwarf mongoose is a diurnal animal. The main predators of dwarf mongoose are predatory birds such as raptors and marabou storks, reptiles such as snakes and monitor lizards, and other carnivorous mammals such as jackals and Egyptian mongooses.

A mutualistic relationship has evolved between the dwarf mongoose and hornbills, in which hornbills seek out the mongooses in order for the two species to forage together, and to warn each other of nearby birds of prey and other predators.

=== Social structure ===
It is a social animal, with an average group size of twelve individuals, but larger packs can exceed thirty members. Packs are organized around a strict hierarchy, with females holding higher positions than males within each age class. Each pack is structured around a single breeding pair, the breeding female of which holds the highest social position while her mate holds the second highest. Younger members and immigrant individuals do not typically reproduce, but instead care for and feed juveniles. Other females may reproduce during good conditions, but their litters rarely survive to adulthood. The breeding pair of a dwarf mongoose colony is given priority access to food and protection from subordinate members, and rarely has to defend against predators. The breeding male is most often responsible for suppressing reproduction among other colony members by confronting them directly when this is attempted, typically with a low-intensity threat posture, which causes the pair to cease their attempted reproduction and retreat. The female of the pair often grooms the alpha male afterwards as an appeasement behavior.

Dispersal and the founding of new packs are relatively rare, and group splits occur most often when the dominant female dies. Non-breeders occasionally transfer between different packs, typically at their second or third year of age and during the rain season, which can result in their obtaining a shorter "queue" for becoming part of the breeding pair of the new pack.

=== Reproduction and life history ===
Dwarf mongooses tend to breed during the wet season, between November and May, where the breeding female may produce up to three litters, containing an average of four pups each after a gestation period of 49 to 53 days. The pups nurse for a period of 45 days, during which they may be nursed by subordinate females. Juveniles begin foraging alongside adults at around six weeks of age, and reach sexual maturity at three years of life. Their maximum lifespan is around 18 years.

=== Diet ===
The primary diet of the common dwarf mongoose consists of invertebrates, mainly insects like beetle larvae, termites, grasshoppers, crickets, spiders and scorpions. Secondary food sources include small vertebrates, eggs, and fruit.

== Publications ==
- Anne Rasa: Mongoose Watch: A Family Observed, John Murray, 1985, ISBN 0-719-54240-5.
- Anne Rasa: "Intra-familial sexual repression in the dwarf mongoose (Helogale parvula)" in Die Naturwissenschaften, Volume 60, Number 6, p. 303-304, Springer, 1973.
