= Anne Rasa =

British ethologist (1940–2020)

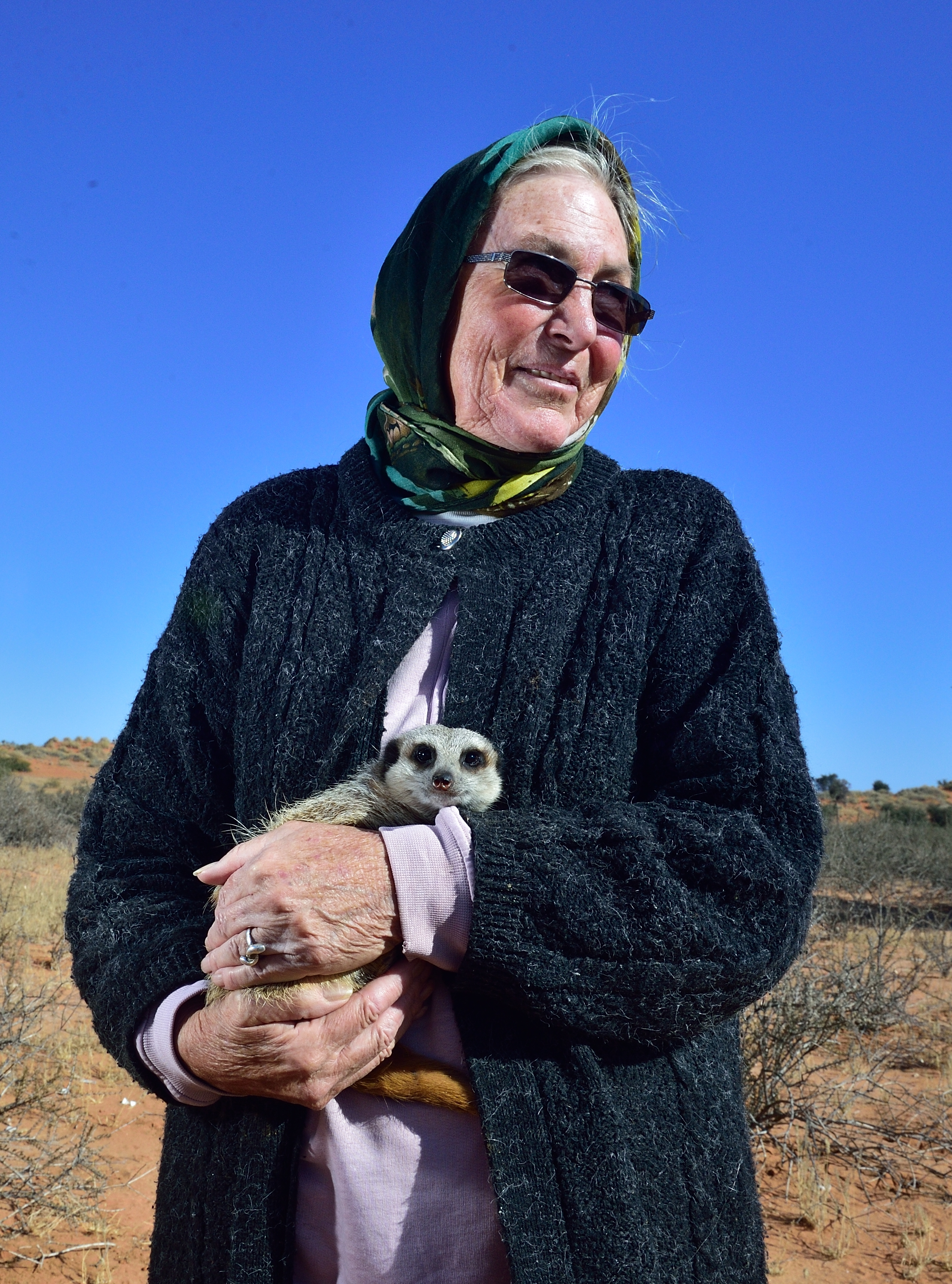
- Rasa in the Northern Cape, South Africa, 2015
- Born: Olwen Anne Elisabeth Rasa; 1940; Wales
- Died: 15 November 2020 (aged 79–80); South Africa
- Occupation: Ethologist
- Known for: Study of social behaviour of dwarf mongoose

Olwen Anne Elisabeth Rasa (1940 – 15 November 2020) was a British ethologist, known for her long-duration study of the social behaviour of the dwarf mongoose in Kenya. She had studied aggression among coral reef fish under the pioneering ethologist Konrad Lorenz. Her fieldwork in Kenya's Taru Desert led to a book, Mongoose Watch: A Family Observed, and to a popular German television series, Expedition ins Tierreich. She later studied social behaviour in the yellow mongoose and the sub-social tenebrionid beetle Parastizopus armaticeps.

== Education ==
In 1961 Anne Rasa graduated with Bachelor of Science (with honors) from the Royal College of Science, Imperial College, London University. Subsequently, she received a NATO-scholarship to investigate the aggression of fish. In 1965 she graduated with a Master of Science from the University of Hawaiʻi. In 1970 Rasa received her Ph.D. from London University with a Max-Planck-Scholarship on coral reef fish aggression under Konrad Lorenz.

== Scientific work ==
From 1970, she continued her work at the Max-Planck-Institut für Verhaltenspsychologie in Seewiesen under Konrad Lorenz. During this period she started her studies on mongoose dwarfs, concentrating on social structure, marking behavior and intra-group aggression.

From 1975, she worked as a scientific assistant at Marburg University, Germany. She focused on ontogeny of behaviour in the dwarf mongoose and was awarded the Habilitation qualification in 1981.

From 1981, her work at the University of Bayreuth was financed by a Heisenberg-Scholarship to study dwarf mongoose in the Taru Desert, Kenya. She published the results in Mongoose Watch: A Family Observed with a foreword by Konrad Lorenz. He compares the significance of her works with those of Jane Goodall and Dian Fossey. In 1984 the book with its results was presented by Bernhard Grzimek in the German TV-series Expedition ins Tierreich and was translated into several languages.

From 1986, Rasa was associate professor at Pretoria University, South Africa, teaching ethology and starting her studies on Yellow mongoose in the Kalahari Desert.

In 1991, she became associate professor at the University of Bonn, where she taught ethology and continuing her studies on Yellow mongoose and studies on the sub-social tenebrionid beetle Parastizopus armaticeps. Rasa retired from Bonn at the end of 2000.

== Post-retirement ==
Rasa owned the Nature Reserve Kalahari Trails at the southern end of the Kalahari Desert in South Africa, which she bought a few years prior to her retirement. She lived there since December 2000 and offered accommodation and guided walks to everyone interested in the flora and fauna of the Kalahari.

In 2007, OSHANA published the book KALAHARI – Magnificent Desert with pictures and text by Rasa.

In 2011/2012, Rasa worked as a scientific advisor on a film series called Kalahari Trails which was being shot in the Kalahari.

== Personal life and death ==
Rasa had three children and four grandchildren. She died on 15 November 2020.

== Publications ==
- Territoriality and the Establishment of Dominance by means of Visual Cues in Pomacentrus jenkinsi (Pisces: Pomacentridae) in Zeitschrift für Tierpsychologie, Volume 26, Issue 7, pages 825–845, Blackwell, 1969.
- The Effect of Pair Isolation on Reproductive Success in Etroplus maculatus (Cichlidae) in Zeitschrift für Tierpsychologie, Volume 26, Issue 7, pages 846–852, Blackwell, 1969.
- Social Interaction and Object Manipulation in Weaned Pups of the Northern Elephant Seal Mirounga angustirostris in Zeitschrift für Tierpsychologie, Volume 29, Issue 1, pages 82–102, Blackwell, 1971.
- with H. Caspers: Appetence for Aggression in juvenile Damsel Fish. Beiheft 7 zur Zeitschrift für Tierpsychologie, Paul Parey, 1971.
- Marking Behaviour and its Social Significance in the African Dwarf Mongoose, Helogale undulata rufula in Zeitschrift für Tierpsychologie, Volume 32, Issue 3, Blackwell, 1973.
- Prey Capture, Feeding Techniques, and their Ontogeny in the African Dwarf Mongoose, Helogale undulata rufula in Zeitschrift für Tierpsychologie, Volume 32, Issue 5, pages 449–488, Blackwell, 1973.
- Intra-familial sexual repression in the dwarf mongoose (Helogale parvula) in Naturwissenschaften, Volume 60, Number 6, p. 303-304, Springer, 1973.
- with Bernhard Grzimek, Irenäus Eibl-Eibesfeldt, et al.: Grzimek's animal life encyclopedia, Volume 1, Lower animals, Van Nostrand Reinhold, 1974.
- Mongoose sociology and behaviour as related to zoo exhibition in International Zoo Yearbook, Volume 15, Issue 1, pages 65–73, 1975.
- Aggression: Appetite or aversion?—An ethologist's viewpoint in Aggressive Behavior, Volume 2, Issue 3, pages 213–222, Wiley-Liss, 1976.
- Invalid Care in the Dwarf Mongoose (Helogale undulata rufula) in Ethology, Volume 42, Issue 4, pages 337–342, Blackwell, 1976.
- The ethology and sociology of the dwarf mongoose (Helogale undulata rufula) in Zeitschrift für Tierpsychologie, Volume 43, Number 4, Paul Parey, 1977.
- The Effects of Crowding on the Social Relationships and Behaviour of the Dwarf Mongoose (Helogale undulata rufula) in Zeitschrift für Tierpsychologie, Volume 49, Issue 3, pages 317–329, Blackwell, 1979.
- Towards a structural concept of agonism in Aggressive Behavior, Volume 8, Issue 3, pages 253–260, Wiley-Liss, 1982.
- A Case of Invalid Care in Wild Dwarf Mongooses in Ethology, Volume 62, Issue 3, pages 235–240, Blackwell, 1983.
- A motivational analysis of object play in juvenile dwarf mongooses (Helogale undulata rufula) in Animal Behaviour, Volume 32, Issue 2, pages 579–589, 1984.
- with H. van den Höövel: Social Stress in the Fieldvole: Differential Causes of Death in Relation to Behaviour and Social Structure in Zeitschrift für Tierpsychologie, Volume 65, Issue 2, pages 108–133, Blackwell, 1984.
- Die perfekte Familie, DVA, 1984, ISBN 3-421-02736-6.
- Mongoose Watch: A Family Observed, John Murray, 1985, ISBN 0-7195-4240-5.
- Coordinated Vigilance in Dwarf Mongoose Family Groups: The 'Watchman's Song' Hypothesis and the Costs of Guarding in Ethology, Volume 71, Issue 4, pages 340–344, Blackwell, 1986.
- Patterns of intra-African small raptor spring migrations in the Taru Desert, Kenya in African Journal of Ecology, Volume 25, Issue 3, pages 165–171, 1987.
- with M. Hopp: Age and sex-related differences in threat perception in a modern urban society in Aggressive Behavior, Volume 15, Issue 5, pages 389–398, Wiley-Liss, 1989.
- with Somers, M.J., Rasa, O.A.E. & Apps, P.J. Marking behaviour and dominance in Suni antelope (Neotragus moschatus). Zeitschrift für Säugetierkunde. 55(5): pages 340–352. 1990.
- with Christian Vogel, Eckart Voland: The Sociobiology of sexual and reproductive strategies, Chapman and Hall, 1989.
- with B.A. Wenhold, P. Howard; A. Marais: Reproduction in the yellow mongoose revisited in South African Journal of Zoology, Volume 27, Number 4, pages 192, 1992.
- with B.A. Wenhold: Territorial marking in the Yellow mongoose Cynictis penicillata: sexual advertisement for subordinates? in Zeitschrift für Säugetierkunde, Volume 59, Number 3, page 129, 1994.
- Parabiosis and its Proximate Mechanisms in Four Kalahari Desert Tenebrionid Beetles in Ethology, Volume 98, Issue 2, pages 137–148, Blackwell, 1994.
- with Somers, M.J. & Penzhorn, B.L. Group structure and social behaviour of warthogs Phacochoerus aethiopicus. Acta Theriologica. 40(3): pages 257–281. 1995.
- with Somers, M.J., Penzhorn, B.L. Home range size, range use and dispersal of warthogs in the eastern Cape, South Africa. Journal of African Zoology. 108(4): pages 361–373. 1994.
- with Somers, M.J. A causal analysis of the relationships between behaviour patterns of free living warthogs. Zeitschrift für Säugetierkunde. 62(2): pages 93–98. 1997.
- Aggregation in a Desert Tenebrionid Beetle: A Cost/Benefit Analysis in Ethology, Volume 103, Issue 6, p. 466-487, Blackwell, 1997.
- Biparental investment and reproductive success in a subsocial desert beetle: the role of maternal effort in Behavioral Ecology and Sociobiology, Volume 43, Number 2, pages 105–113, Springer, 1998.
- Division of Labour and Extended Parenting in a Desert Tenebrionid Beetle in Ethology, Volume 105, Issue 1, p. 37-56, Blackwell, 1999.
- with Michael Streif, Divorce and its consequences in the Common Blackbird Turdus merula in Ibis, Volume 143, Issue 3, pages 554–560, 2001.
- with Dik Heg, Effects of parental body condition and size on reproductive success in a tenebrionid beetle with biparental care in Ecological Entomology, Volume 29, Issue 4, pages 410–419, 2004.
- KALAHARI – Magnificent Desert. OSHANA Publishing, 2007, ISBN 978-0-620-35898-9.
