= Thandeka (minister) =

American Unitarian Universalist minister, theologian and author

Rev. Dr. Thandeka
- Born: Sue Booker; March 25, 1946 (age 80); New Jersey, U.S.
- Education: Claremont Graduate University (Ph.D.); UCLA (M.A.); Columbia University, School of Journalism (M.A.); University of Illinois, Urbana-Champaign (B.A.)
- Occupations: Theologian and activist
- Known for: Contemporary affect theory, critical vision theory, theology, philosophy
- Website: revthandeka.org

Thandeka is a Unitarian Universalist minister, an American liberal theologian, and the creator of a contemporary affect theology.

Thandeka's affect theology grounds religious knowing in human feeling, combining concepts from nineteenth-century theologian Friedrich Schleiermacher with insights from affective neuroscience. Thandeka is the founder and CEO of Love Beyond Belief, a non-profit organization.

== Biography ==
Thandeka was born Sue Booker to Emma (Barbour) Booker, an artist and teacher, and Merrel D. Booker, a Baptist minister and seminary professor who had studied with Reinhold Niebuhr and Paul Tillich at Union Theological Seminary in New York City. She was drawn to the Unitarian church in the 1960s, and was ordained as a Unitarian Universalist minister in 2001. She received her name from Archbishop Desmond Tutu in 1984; it means "beloved" or "one who is loved by God" in Xhosa.

She studied journalism at the University of Illinois Urbana-Champaign and Columbia University's Graduate School of Journalism, and went on to earn an M.A. in history of religions at University of California, Los Angeles. She earned a Ph.D. from Claremont Graduate University in 1988, where she studied with John B. Cobb and Jack C. Verheyden.

== Career ==
Thandeka has taught at San Francisco State University, Williams College, Meadville Lombard Theological School, Harvard Divinity School, Lancaster Seminary, and Brandeis University.

=== Theology ===
Thandeka's theological work considers the role of feeling or emotion in human religious and spiritual experiences. Her book The Embodied Self is based on a close reading of Schleiermacher's Dialektik, focusing on his idea that feeling is primary in human experience, and exploring how feeling enables people to connect mind and body, or thinking and organic being. Her work considers the religious significance of neuroscientific understandings of emotions, such as those of Jaak Panksepp. Thandeka's affect theology centers affective consciousness, as opposed to belief, in religious experience.

=== White racial identity ===
Thandeka also critiques some popular approaches to anti-racism work, and takes a different approach to understanding white racial identity. She considers the concepts of racism and white privilege to be terms needing further exploration. She affirms explorations begun by James Baldwin, using insights from neuroscience and complex post-traumatic stress disorders. Thandeka analyzes the psychology of white identities that were constructed in America to hide a profound sense of betrayal by one's own white kith and kin, white community, and white government. This sense of betrayal injures persons' ability to be "relational beings." While Thandeka is hopeful that her insights into this will help white Americans discover their common ground with other groups who are suffering so that mutual advance are made, others disagree.

== Publications ==
Thandeka's book The Embodied Self: Friedrich Schleiermacher's Solution to Kant's Problem of the Empirical Self (1995), undertakes a major re-reading of the philosophical analysis of F. D. E. Schleiermacher's theological claims, namely, his Dialektik.
