= Patricia Majalisa =

South African musician (1967-2020)

Patricia Majalisa (15 February 1967 – 9 July 2020) was a South African bubblegum musician. She was known for her contribution to the genre and inspiring the birth of Kwaito music.

== Early life ==
Majalisa was born on 15 February 1967 in East London, Eastern Cape province of South Africa. She rose to fame after the launch of her solo career in 1986. She was initially part of the popular Afro pop group Splash, which was headed by Dan Tshanda.

== Career ==
Majalisa went solo in the late 1980s, releasing several albums, including Cool Down, Gimba and Witchdoctor, which all achieved platinum status. Her discography has over 15 albums and EPs. Majalisa's popularity in Botswana and Zimbabwe saw her headline several events and tour with Dan Tshanda.

Majalisa released albums like Poverty, Ithemba lami.

== Later life ==
Patricia Majalisa died on 9 July 2020 due to liver failure.
