= Dewa Mavhinga =

Zimbabwean lawyer (1979–2021)

Dewa Mavhinga (1979 – 4 December 2021) was a lawyer and Southern African Director of Human Rights Watch.

He died of suspected COVID-19 complications.

== Education ==
Mavhinga attended Sandringham mission and then studied law at University of Zimbabwe (LLB) and University of Essex (LLM). In Zimbabwe, he was elected president of the Student Representative Council (SRC) and it was through his student activism that his interest in human rights deepened. For his postgraduate studies, he received a Canon Collins Trust scholarship.

== Career ==
After university, he joined the Crisis in Zimbabwe Coalition as a Regional Coordinator based in Johannesburg, South Africa. He then co-founded the Zimbabwe Democracy Institute, a public policy think-tank based in Harare, Zimbabwe. Mavhinga was an on the ground human rights practitioner who spent most of his career working within communities in southern Africa in countries such as Eswatini, Lesotho, Malawi, South Africa, and Zimbabwe as a representative of the Human Rights Watch. In a short career, Mavhinga, is celebrated as one of the most tireless defenders of human rights from his generation.

== Controversy ==
He is often criticised for his testimony before the US Congress in support of the Zimbabwe Democracy and Economic Recovery Act of 2001, which the ruling ZANU PF party in Zimbabwe blames for the country's economic woes. The act was created as a deterrent and reaction to the Mugabe regime's infamous land grab programme resulting in a group of politicians placed under targeted sanctions. This earned Mavhinga the ire of the Zimbabwe government who considered him to be an 'enemy' and 'puppet' of the west.

== Personal ==
He was married to Fiona Muchembere, his college sweetheart, and they had four children: Gamu, Mufaro, Hondo and Makaita.
