= Nyiri Desert =

Semi-arid desert in southern Kenya

Coordinates: 2°23′48″S 37°15′38″E

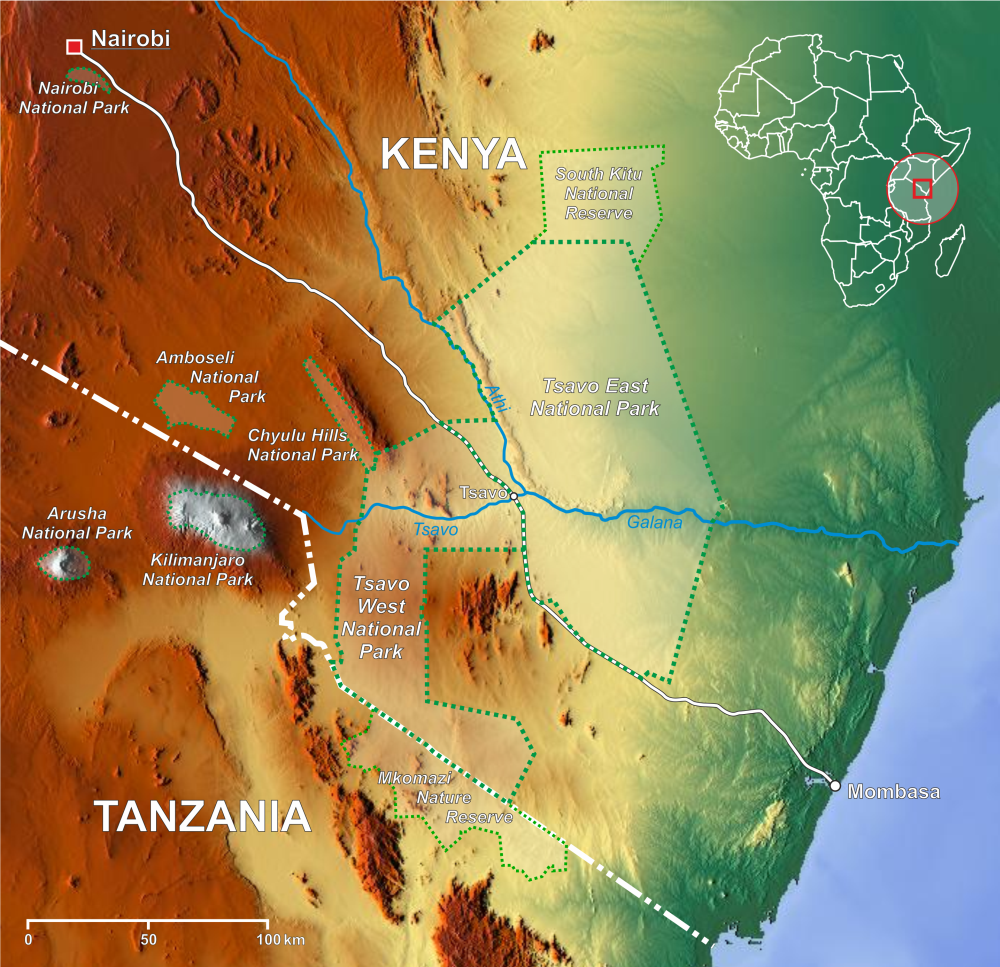
Nyiri Desert map, showing its position relative to Tsavo and Amboseli

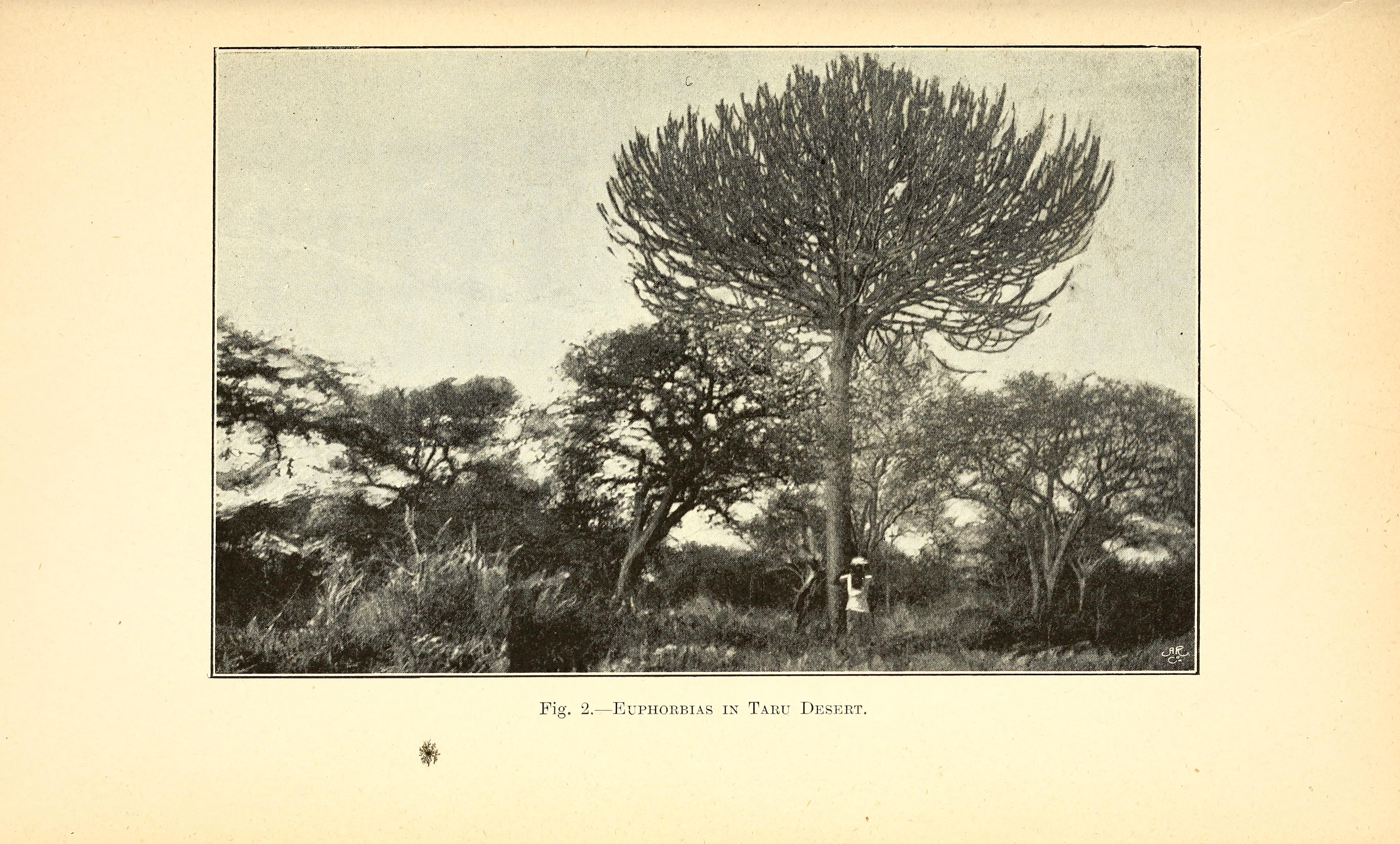
The Taru Desert, as illustrated in a 19th-century naturalist's account

Nyiri Desert, also called The Nyika, Taru Desert, or Taru Plain, is a semi-arid desert in south-central Kenya. It lies approximately 80 kilometres (50 miles) east of Lake Magadi and near the northern border of Tanzania, situated between Amboseli, Tsavo West and Nairobi national parks. The desert encompasses Amboseli National Park, including the northern half of Lake Amboseli. A high proportion of Kajiado County's land area is covered by the Nyiri Desert. Its aridity is primarily caused by the rain shadow of Mount Kilimanjaro.

The name Nyiri (sometimes rendered as Nyika) derives from a Swahili term broadly meaning bushland or wilderness. The older name Taru is of indigenous origin, historically applied by coastal and interior communities to the semi-arid belt separating the Kenyan coast from the interior plateau.

== Geography ==
The Nyiri Desert occupies a significant portion of southern Kajiado County in Kenya's Rift Valley region. Its western boundary is defined approximately by the vicinity of Lake Magadi, a soda lake in the East African Rift, while its southern extent approaches the Tanzania–Kenya border. To the southeast, the desert is bounded by the Chyulu Hills; to the east lies Tsavo National Park. The landscape is characterised by exposed loose gravels consisting predominantly of pebbles, exposed bedrock outcrops, rocky inselbergs, and desert soils overlying older geological formations.

== Climate ==
The climate of the Nyiri Desert is semi-arid, with mean annual rainfall ranging from approximately 150 to 300 mm, falling chiefly during two short rain seasons in April and December. Daytime temperatures frequently reach 38 °C (100 °F), while nights can be significantly cooler, dropping to around 18 °C (64 °F). The desert's aridity is principally caused by its position in the rain shadow on the leeward side of Mount Kilimanjaro, which intercepts moisture-bearing winds from the Indian Ocean.

== Ecology ==
=== Flora ===
Vegetation in the Nyiri Desert is sparse and adapted to prolonged dry conditions. The dominant plant communities consist of thorny acacia trees, euphorbia scrub, and Commiphora shrubland, some of which are toxic to livestock and humans. During the dry season the vegetation is largely bare, its trees contorted by greyish-green creepers and the hornlike fronds of thorny euphorbia. Following the short rains of April and December, the plains experience brief but dramatic blooms of wildflowers, including blue and white convolvulus.

Baobab (Adansonia digitata) trees are found scattered across the desert, with some specimens estimated to be over 2,000 years old, their grey trunks frequently reaching up to three metres in diameter.

=== Fauna ===
Despite its aridity, the Nyiri Desert supports a range of large mammals, including elephant, giraffe, rhinoceros, lion, leopard, lesser kudu, and impala. The desert functions as an important wildlife corridor, facilitating seasonal elephant migrations between Tsavo East National Park to the northeast and Mount Kilimanjaro to the south. Hornbills are commonly observed between May and July. Permanent water is scarce, limited to a small number of springs and widely spaced seasonal riverbeds, which serve as focal points for wildlife during dry periods.

== Human geography ==
The desert and its surrounding semi-arid rangelands fall primarily within Kajiado County, which is predominantly inhabited by Maasai semi-nomadic pastoralists who have managed the landscape communally for centuries. Traditional Maasai land management involved seasonal livestock movements across communal rangelands, a practice well suited to the variable rainfall and sparse pasture of the semi-arid zone. In recent decades, the progressive privatisation of land tenure has restricted these movements, contributing to overgrazing and land degradation across parts of Kajiado.

== History ==
The Taru Plain, as the desert was historically known, presented a formidable natural barrier to movement between the Kenyan coast and the interior. During the 19th century, Arab and Swahili caravan routes in search of ivory avoided the route from Mombasa toward Mount Kilimanjaro and Lake Victoria partly because of the difficulty of crossing the desert country of the Taru Plain, and partly because of the resistance of the Maasai. The region consequently remained one of the last parts of the East African interior to be documented by outside travellers in the colonial era.

== Conservation ==
The Nyiri Desert's role as a wildlife corridor connecting Amboseli, Tsavo, and the Kilimanjaro ecosystem gives it considerable conservation significance. Conservation initiatives in the region have focused on protecting wildlife migration routes and supporting sustainable land use among Maasai communities, including through community conservancies and eco-tourism programmes.
