= Cyril George =

South African politician (died 2022)

Member of the National Assembly
- In office May 1994 – June 1999

Personal details
- Born: 1947/1948
- Died: 6 January 2022 (aged 74)
- Citizenship: South Africa
- Party: African Christian Democratic Party (from 2004)
- Other political affiliations: New National Party; Democratic Alliance; National Party

Cyril Maurice George (died 6 January 2022) was a South African politician who represented the National Party (NP) and New National Party (NNP) in the National Assembly from 1994 to 1999. He later served as a local councillor in eThekwini Metropolitan Municipality, representing variously the NNP, the Democratic Alliance (DA), and the African Christian Democratic Party (ACDP).

== Political career ==
George was born in 1947 or 1948 and was formerly an educator. He was elected to the National Assembly in the 1994 general election, representing the NP; he served a single term and left after the 1999 general election.

He later served as a local councillor in Durban's eThekwini Metropolitan Municipality. He crossed the floor twice: initially elected as a representative of the DA, he defected back to the NNP in October 2002 and then from the NNP to the ACDP in September 2004. He remained with the ACDP thereafter.

== Personal life ==
George was married to Brenda George (née Young), with whom he had three children and several grandchildren. He was Christian and lived in Sydenham, Durban after his retirement. He died on 6 January 2022, aged 74, due to complications from COVID-19.
