= Dora Nginza Hospital =

- Eastern Cape Department of Health

Geography
- Location: Gqeberha, Nelson Mandela Bay Metropolitan Municipality, Eastern Cape, South Africa
- Coordinates: 33°52′38″S 25°33′36″E

Organisation
- Care system: Public
- Type: Tertiary
- Affiliated university: [Walter Sisulu University]Nelson Mandela Metropolitan University

Services
- Emergency department: Yes

Links
- Website: Dora Nginza Hospital
- Other links: List of hospitals in South Africa

Dora Nginza Hospital is a large Provincial government funded hospital, situated on Spondo Street in Zwide township of Gqeberha in South Africa. It is a tertiary teaching hospital and forms part of the Port Elizabeth Hospital Complex.

The hospital departments include Emergency department, Neonatal and Paediatric wards, Maternity ward, Obstetrics/Gynecology, Psychiatry [ 35 bed Acute Mental Health Unit], Outpatient Adult and Child Psychiatry Clinics, Out Patients Department, Surgical Services, Medical Services, Operating Theatre & CSSD Services, Pharmacy, Anti-Retroviral (ARV) treatment for HIV/AIDS, Post Trauma Counseling Services, Occupational Services, X-ray Services, Occupational Therapy, Speech Therapy, Physiotherapy, NHLS Laboratory, Oral Health Care Provides, Laundry Services, Kitchen Services and Mortuary, Dietitians, Lactation Consultation, The only functional Burn Unit (Paediatric and Adult) in the Eastern Cape.
