= Nonkululeko Gobodo =

South African accountant (born 1960)

- Born: October 10, 1960; Mthatha township, South Africa
- Other names: Nonku
- Occupations: Chartered Accountant; Leadership Consultant; University Chancellor
- Known for: founding Gobodo Incorporated and Nkululeko Leadership Consulting

Nonkululeko Gobodo (born 10 October 1960, Mthatha, Eastern Cape) became the first black female Chartered Accountant in South Africa in 1987. In 2023 she was appointed Chancellor of Walter Sisulu University.

== Early career ==
Following her education, Nonkululeko articled at KPMG, and was offered a partnership, which she turned down. She then worked for Transkei Development Corporation, eventually rising to become Chief Financial Officer. Following that, she founded her own medium-sized accountancy firm Gobodo Incorporated. She was instrumental in leading the 2011 merger of Gobodo Incorporated with SizweNtsaluba VSP to form SizweNtsalubaGobodo, South Africa's largest black-owned accountancy firm. In 2014 she stepped down from the role of executive chair of the company.

== Current career ==
In 2016 she co-founded Nkululeko Leadership Consulting (NLC), a boutique, black-owned and managed leadership consulting firm based in Sandton, Johannesburg. She is currently the CEO and Head of Leadership Consulting at NLC. She is also non-executive director at PPC Ltd. and Clicks Group Limited. She was appointed the Chancellor of Walter Sisulu University from 1 May 2023, to be officially inaugurated on 29 June 2023.
