= Thandi Mgwebi =

South African Academic

iYunivesithi Walter Sisulu Vice Chancellor
- Preceded by: Rushiella Songca

Personal details
- Education: Walter Sisulu University; University of Cape Town

Thandi Mgwebi is a South African scientist and the current vice- chancellor of iYunivesithi Walter Sisulu. Prior to her appointment, she served as the deputy vice chancellor of Tshwane University of Technology (TUT).

== Education ==
Mgwebi obtained her first degree from the University of Transkei, which is now known as Walter Sisulu University. She obtained her doctorate from the University of Cape Town in medical cell and developmental biology. She also possessed degree in Tertiary Educational Management degree, which she obtained from the University of Melbourne.

== Selected articles ==
- Rosamund Chapman; William R Bourn; Enid Shephard; et al. (2014). "The use of directed evolution to create a stable and immunogenic recombinant BCG expressing a modified HIV-1 Gag antigen". PLOS One. 9 (7) e103314. Bibcode:2014PLoSO...9j3314C. doi:10.1371/journal.pone.0103314. PMC 4111510. PMID 25061753. Wikidata Q33952259.
- Burgers, Wendy; Joanne H van Harmelen; Enid Shephard; et al. (2006). "Design and preclinical evaluation of a multigene human immunodeficiency virus type 1 subtype C DNA vaccine for clinical trial". Journal of General Virology. 87 (Pt 2): 399–410. doi:10.1099/vir.0.81379-0. PMID 16432028. Wikidata Q45420516.
