= Eastern Cape Technikon =

The Eastern Cape Technikon was an institution of higher education in South Africa. It was first established as an engineering campus of the University of Transkei in 1985 and received autonomy in 1994. In 2004, almost 9000 students registered at its four campuses.

The Eastern Cape Technikon ceased to exist on 1 July 2005, when merged with the Border Technikon and the University of Transkei to form the Walter Sisulu University.
