= Thembekile Kimi Makwetu =

South African accountant (died 2020)

Auditor-General of South Africa
- In office 1 December 2013 – 11 November 2020
- President: Jacob Zuma
- Preceded by: Terence Nombembe
- Succeeded by: Tsakani Maluleke

Deputy Auditor-General
- In office 2007 – 1 December 2013

Personal details
- Born: Cape Town, South Africa
- Died: 11 November 2020

Thembekile Kimi Makwetu (died 11 November 2020) was a South African Chartered accountant. He served as the Auditor-General of South Africa between 2013 and 2020.

== Education ==
Makwetu was born in Cape Town, South Africa on 7 January 1966. Matriculated in 1984 from St Johns College in Mthatha. In 1989, he graduated with a degree in Social Sciences from the University of Cape Town. After receiving a BCompt Honours degree from the University of Natal in 1997, he qualified as a chartered accountant.

== Career ==
He took a job with Standard Bank, and would go on to work at Nampak. He completed his articles of clerkship at Deloitte. He later went on to work for Metropolitan Life in Western Cape and for Liberty Life in Gauteng, before becoming a director in Deloitte's forensic unit. In 2007, he joined the Auditor-General's office as Deputy Auditor-General under Terence Nombembe.

=== Auditor-General ===
On 1 December 2013, South African President Jacob Zuma appointed Makwetu Auditor-General of South Africa for a seven-year term. In February 2014 Makwetu drew attention to what he described as "wasteful and irregular" government spending. A later report from Makwetu in November 2015 said there had been a "slight improvement".

== Death ==
Makwetu died from lung cancer on 11 November 2020. His term as Auditor-General was set to expire on 30 November. He will be replaced by his deputy, Tsakani Maluleke.

== See also ==
- Comptroller and Auditor General
