= Cedric Xulu =

South African footballer (1939–2020)

Personal information
- Date of birth: 13 December 1939
- Date of death: 4 May 2020 (aged 80)
- Place of death: Pinetown, South Africa

Youth career
- 1954–1965: Clermont Home Defenders
- 1965–1971: Avalon Athletic
- 1971: Hammanskraal United

Senior career*
Years	Team	Apps	(Gls)
1971–1983	Zulu Royals		
- Mbabane Swallows

International career
- South Africa Black XI
- * Club domestic league appearances and goals

Cedric "Sugar Ray" Xulu (13 December 1939 – 4 May 2020) was a South African soccer player.

== Career ==
Xulu was a footballer whose career in the 1960s led him to play for local side AmaZulu and Mbabane Swallows in Swaziland. In 1972, he played for Zulu Royals (now AmaZulu), who won the NPSL that season. He played for the SA Black XI in the 1970s, which he captained.

He received the Chairman's Award at the 2019 PSL Awards.

The stadium Sugar Ray Xulu Stadium in the City of Durban is named after him.
