= Thandeka Mdeliswa =

South African actress (1986–2020)

- Born: 22 May 1986; Mpumalanga, South Africa
- Died: 5 September 2020 (aged 34); Steve Biko Academic Hospital, Pretoria, Gauteng, South Africa
- Cause of death: Gunshot
- Education: Brumilda's Acting Academy
- Occupation: Actor
- Years active: 2013–2020
- Known for: Ikani

Thandeka Mdeliswa (22 May 1986 – 5 September 2020) was a South African actress, best known for her starring role as Khanya in the SABC1 drama series Ikani.

== Career ==
Thandeka's first television role was in 2013, in an episode "Imbiza" of the series Ekasi: Our Stories. She also landed minor roles on local soapie Generations: The Legacy, Isidingo, Rhythm City, and the SABC1 short story series Ngempela.

In 2018 she starred in movie Imoto Kokufa.

== Filmography ==
=== Television ===
Year	Title	Role	Notes
2014	Ngempela	Portia	
2013	eKasi:Our Stories		
2016	Generations:The Legacy		Guest star
2018	Ikani	Khanya	

== Death ==
She was shot on 3 September, in Evander, Mpumalanga. She was rushed to the Steve Biko Academic Hospital in Pretoria where she was in a critical condition. Mdeliswa died on 5 September morning.
