= Kirvan Fortuin =

South African dancer

Kirvan Fortuin (10 August 1991 – 13 June 2020) was a Khoikhoi First Nation dancer, choreographer and LGBT activist.

== Career ==
Born in Macassar, Fortuin joined the Cape Whalers Field Band in 2002, which prompted their interest in dance. They began formal dance training at the University of Cape Town in 2010, studying classical dance, contemporary dance, African dance and other dance forms. Fortuin qualified with a dance teacher's diploma in 2012 and performed that year at the International Theatre School Festival in Amsterdam, the Netherlands. They received a BMus (Hons) in choreography from University of Cape Town, and a Bachelor of Dance from Codarts University for the Arts in Rotterdam.

Fortuin choreographed works for the Cape Town City Ballet, Dance Umbrella Johannesburg, Vrystaat Kunstefees, Artscape Theatre Centre, Suidoosterfees, Afrovibes NL & SA and the Afrikaanse Kultuurfees. At Framer Framed in Amsterdam, Fortuin gave a performance response to the exhibition Re(as)sisting Narratives (2016). Fortuin created this new choreography inspired by the themes addressed, the exhibition space and the diverse works on show among which the video's Ga Bose Gangwe (2013) and Inzilo (2013) by Mohau Modisakeng. The event was a collaboration with AfroVibes Festival.

In 2017, Fortuin founded House of Le Cap, South Africa's first ballroom house. As an LGBT activist, Fortuin hosted Africa's first Vogue Ball on World AIDS Day to raise awareness and fund for the LGBT community affected by HIV.

== Awards and recognition ==
In 2012, Fortuin received the Best International Production (Guest Award) at the International Theatre School Festival in Amsterdam. University of Cape Town recognised them with an award for Meritorious Achievement in the Performing and Creative Arts in 2012. From 2014 to 2015 Fortuin was recognised by Krisztina de Chatel's foundation, Stichting Imperium, and received a stipend from the organisation. Fortuin was the recipient of the Dance Award for Modern Dance from the Pierino Ambrosoli Foundation in Zurich. In 2019 Fortuin was awarded the Ministerial Award for Outstanding Contribution to Preservation and Promotion of an Indigenous Art Form from the Western Cape Government.

== Death ==
Fortuin was fatally stabbed on 13 June 2020 in their hometown of Macassar. A fourteen-year-old girl was arrested in connection with their death.

== Choreographed works ==
- An Aborted Beginning (a dance film)
- Loud Silence: In The Memory of Her Mind
- Kirby K, premiered in September 2014
- When They Leave (with Romane Petit), premiered in May 2015 at De Doelen Theatre, Rotterdam
- Tussen Niks en Nêrens, premiered on 25 November 2015
- After 9, premiered on 9 April 2016
- Stille Water, premiered on 9 April 2016 at Compagnietheater, Amsterdam
- Abashante!, premiered on 27 May 2016 at Maaspodium, Rotterdam
- Nomvula, premiered on 3 September 2016, The Hague
- Rite: Ndinyindoda siyaya..., premiered on 2 October 2016, Rotterdam
- Silver & Gold (You&I), premiered on 4 March 2017 at Dance Umbrella Johannesburg, Wits Theatre Complex
- In Your Hands, premiered on 22 September 2017 at Artscape Theatre Centre, Cape Town
- Katrina Die Dansende Taal, premiered on 19 September 2018 at Artscape Theatre Centre, Cape Town
