= Corra Dirksen =

South African rugby union player (1938–2020)

- Born: Cornelius Wilhelmus Dirksen; 22 January 1938 Vereeniging, Union of South Africa
- Died: 10 July 2020 (aged 82) Krugersdorp, South Africa
- Height: 1.84 m (6 ft 0 in)
- Weight: 84 kg (185 lb)
- School: Vereeniging High
- Notable relative: Hanno Dirksen (nephew)

Rugby union career
- Position: Wing
Provincial / State sides
Years	Team	Apps	(Points)
	Northern Transvaal	35	
International career
Years	Team	Apps	(Points)
1963–68	South Africa	10	(9)

Cornelius Wilhelmus "Corra" Dirksen (22 January 1938 – 10 July 2020) was a South African rugby player. He won 10 caps and scored three tries.

== Biography ==
Dirksen made his international debut against Australia in 1963. The 1967 series against France was probably his finest hour, scoring all three of his test tries against them. The French were understandably quite wary of him throughout that series, dubbing him Le Monster (The Monster).

He played for the then Northern Transvaal (now Blue Bulls) and the Oostelikes (Easterns) club in Pretoria, which later merged with Adelaars to form Naka Bulls. After retiring from playing he qualified as a medical practitioner, and moved to Krugersdorp.

He died from COVID-19 complications during the COVID-19 pandemic in South Africa on 10 July 2020.

=== Test history ===
No.	Opponents	Results (SA 1st)	Position	Tries	Dates	Venue
1.	Australia	22–6	Wing		7 Sep 1963	Boet Erasmus Stadium, Port Elizabeth
2.	Wales	24–3	Wing		23 May 1964	Kings Park, Durban
3.	Ireland	6–9	Wing		10 Apr 1965	Lansdowne Road, Dublin
4.	Scotland	5–8	Wing		17 Apr 1965	Murrayfield Stadium, Edinburgh
5.	France	26–3	Wing	2	15 Jul 1967	Kings Park, Durban
6.	France	16–3	Wing	1	22 Jul 1967	Free State Stadium, Bloemfontein
7.	France	14–19	Wing		29 Jul 1967	Ellis Park, Johannesburg
8.	France	6–6	Wing		12 Aug 1967	Newlands, Cape Town
9.	British Lions	25–20	Wing		8 Jun 1968	Loftus Versfeld, Pretoria
10.	British Lions	6–6	Wing		22 Jun 1968	Boet Erasmus Stadium, Port Elizabeth

== See also ==
- List of South Africa national rugby union players – Springbok no. 393
