= Clinton Marius =

South African writer and performer (1966–2020)

- Born: 20 August 1966; Pietermaritzburg, South Africa
- Died: 26 February 2020 (aged 53)
- Occupation: actor
- Years active: 1996–2020

Clinton Marius (20 August 1966 – 26 February 2020) was a South African writer and performer. He was born in Pietermaritzburg, and made his first professional appearance singing the lead role in Menotti's opera, Amahl and the Night Visitors at age twelve. His poetry has been published internationally, while he was also known for penning several plays and collections of short stories, as well as the fictional biography of a guru, Sunshine – The Booklet of the Biography.

== Theatrical career ==
In 2002, he directed Jonathan Cumming's The Gladiator at the National Arts Festival, and co-ordinated A Slice of Madness, a season of theatre in Durban in which he appeared in David Campton's Mutatis Mutandis. In January 2003 he appeared at the KwaSuka Theatre in The Divine Child. In April 2003 he founded the annual Fools Awards in KwaZulu-Natal in recognition of arts practitioners' contributions. His performance alongside Greig Coetzee in Kobus Moolman's Soldier Boy, winner of the BBC worldwide radio drama competition, was broadcast internationally.

Clinton Marius' highly successful one-man show, Uncut – The Penis Monologues, directed by Garth Anderson, premiered in Durban in September 2003 before starting its national tour. He also performed in his stage drama, Vergissmeinnicht (Farm of Secrets) at the 2003 National Arts Festival in Grahamstown. This was followed by the New Age send-up, Guru, and the one-man comedy Thank You Very Much, a satire about Hollywood and celebrities.
