= Mary-Anne Plaatjies van Huffel =

South African pastor and academic (1959–2020)

Mary-Anne Plaatjies van Huffel (15 December 1959 – 19 May 2020) was a South African pastor and academic. She was the first female minister to be ordained by a Dutch Reformed Church in Southern Africa.

Plaatjies van Huffel was educated at the Bergriver High School in Wellington, and studied at University of the Western Cape, the University of South Africa (UNISA) and Pretoria University. She was the holder of two doctorates in Theology, one from UNISA (2003 Thesis on: Women in the theological anthropology of the Afrikaans Reformed Churches) and one from University of Pretoria (2009 Thesis on: Doleantie Church Polity and the church polity development of the mission churches in South Africa).

She was called to Robertson-Robertson East combination congregation and was ordained on 26 November 1992 as the first woman minister of the Word in the Dutch Reformed family. She was the first black woman to be promoted to full professor at the Faculty of Theology at Stellenbosch University. She was also the first woman to be elected as moderator of the General Synod of the Uniting Reformed Church in Southern Africa (URCSA).

This honor was bestowed on her during the General Synod of URCSA in Namibia 2012. She taught Church History and Canon Law at Stellenbosch University.

She was elected as one of eight presidents of the World Council of Churches (WCC) at the General Assembly of the WCC in Busan, Korea, 2013. She would have served in this position until 2021, however she died at age 60 on 19 May 2020 from complications of undisclosed surgery.

== Family ==
She was married to Rev Dawid van Huffel.

== Publications ==
1. Reading the Belhar Confession – as historical text in Reformed Churches in South Africa and the struggle for justice – Remembering 1960–1990 (Redaksie: RR Vosloo en MA Plaatjies van Huffel), Sun media, 2013
2. The Belhar Confession – as historical text
3. The remarkable career of Christina Landman, pioneer feminist theologian, rooted in the Reformed tradition
4. The search for a common understanding with regard to ecology and justice in the Uniting Reformed Church in Southern Africa Studia Historicae Ecclesiasticae XXXIX(2), December 2013
5. The URCSA’S engagement on legal matters in South Africa (red P Coertzen) – 102 – NGTT Deell 54 Supplementum 4, 2013 p. 101–113.
6. The Belhar Confession: Born in the struggle against apartheid in Southern Africa, guiding light today (SHE) 2013. pp. 1–11.
7. Michel Foucault se historiografiese benadering as lens in historiese ondersoeke Acta Theologica Jaargang 32 No. 1 Junie 2012
8. Die stryd om die aard en omvang van die tugreg by die Nederduitse Gereformeerde Sendingkerk (1881−1994)’, HTS Teologiese Studies/Theological Studies 68(1) 2012,
9. Die reis met kerkeenwording tussen die Verenigende Gereformeerde Kerk in Suider-Afrika en die Nederduitse Gereformeerde Kerk in Afrika
10. Patriarchy as empire: a theological reflection Studia Historicae Ecclesiasticae, December/December 2011 ● Volume XXXVII ● Supplement.
11. Control, secede, vested rights and ecclesiastical property. Studia Historicae Ecclesiasticae Vol. 37 (2), September 2011
12. The Institutionalization of Christian women’s organisations: from docile recipients to agents of change in Studia Historicae Ecclesiasticae Vol. 37 (1) May 2011.
13. Die kerkreg en kerkregering van die Nederduitse Gereformeerde Sendingkerk (1881–1915) in NGTT 2011. (p. 194–204).
14. Vroue in die teologiese antropologie in die Afrikaanse Gereformeerde tradisie in Studia Historicae Ecclesiasticae Vol 31 (1). 2005 (p. 203–222).
