= Auditor-General (South Africa) =

Chapter nine institution overview
- Formed: 1911; 115 years ago
- Headquarters: 4 Daventry Street, Lynnwood Bridge Office Park, Lynnwood Manor, Pretoria
- Motto: Auditing to build public confidence
- Employees: 1 367 (36%) qualified auditors; 850 (23%) non-audit employees
- Chapter nine institution executives: Tsakani Maluleke, Auditor-General of South Africa; Vonani Chauke, Deputy Auditor-General
- Key documents: Chapter 9, Section 181(2) of the Constitution; Public Audit Act 25 of 2004; Public Audit Act (PAA) Regulations; Public Audit Amendment Act, No. 5 of 2018
- Website: https://www.agsa.co.za/

The Auditor-General of South Africa (AGSA) is an office established by the 1996 Constitution of South Africa and is one of the Chapter nine institutions intended to support democracy, although its history dates back at least 100 years.

Tsakani Maluleke took over as Auditor-General on 1 December 2020. She replaced Thembekile Makwetu who was deputy auditor-general until he took over from Terence Nombembe whose contract ended in December 2013. Nombembe, who also served as deputy auditor-general prior to his appointment, replaced Shauket Fakie on his retirement in December 2006.

== Mandate ==
The Auditor-General, a "watchdog over the government," is an ombudsman-type office similar to that of the Public Protector, but with much more limited jurisdiction. The focus of the office is not inefficient or improper bureaucratic conduct but the proper use and management of public money. Section 188 of the Constitution states that the Auditor-General is required to report on the finances of all national, provincial and local government administrations and has the discretion to audit any institution that receives money for a public purpose. The reports of the Auditor-General must be made public. They must also be submitted to any legislature which has a direct interest in the audit, and to any other authority prescribed by national legislation.

Section 181(2) of the Constitution asserts that the Auditor-General is independent, and that the powers and functions of the office should be exercised without fear, favour or prejudice. In terms of section 189, the tenure of the Auditor-General is for a fixed, non-renewable term of between five and 10 years. The Public Audit Act gives detailed effect to the constitutional provisions, and deals with such matters as conditions of service, functions, administration, reporting obligations and powers of investigation. The provisions for appointment and removal are similar to those that apply to the Public Protector. As with the Public Protector, these provisions are intended to ensure that the Auditor-General is independent of the executive and of other influences, and responsible only to Parliament. Unlike the Public Protector, however, the Auditor-General is not reliant on the executive for its funding. The office funds itself by charging fees for its services, "a feature that undoubtedly enhances its political independence." Stuart Woolman and Yolandi Schutte describe the Auditor-General as the institution most likely of all the Chapter 9 institutions to retain its independence and discharge its constitutional responsibility.

== History ==
The Auditor General's office was established by legislation in 1911, and this legislation was amended over the years, with the institution celebrating its centenary in 2011.

The first auditor general, as appointed per the Constitution, was Shauket Fakie who served until his retirement in 2006. Terence Nombembe was appointed on 1 December 2006 and served until 30 November 2013. Nombembe is a member of the South African Institute of Chartered Accountants as a Chartered Accountant (South Africa). On 1 December 2013 the President of the Republic appointed Thembekile Makwetu to replace Nombembe, whose term had ended. Makwetu, who is also a chartered accountant (CA) by profession, has served as deputy auditor general for six years prior to his appointment as the auditor general.

As to the effectiveness of the Auditor-General in practice, Sarkin's assessment of 2000 was more sanguine than in relation to the Public Protector. He noted that the office had "done some excellent work," and described the incumbent of the time, Shauket Fakie, as "more vigorous and energetic" than his predecessor, whose work had been criticised. Some of the more recent investigations conducted by the Auditor-General have exposed instances of financial mismanagement ranging from huge debt at the Government Printing Works and unauthorised expenditure by several government departments to the fraudulent allocation of subsidies in the Department of Housing and irregularities in procurement processes at the Companies and Intellectual Property Registration Office.

=== Controversy ===
The Auditor-General attracted some controversy, however, over his refusal to provide access to records concerning the procurement of arms and his subsequent failure to comply with a court order to produce the records within a certain period.

A particular problem identified in the Asmal Report is "persistent disregard for the Auditor-General’s recommendations by government departments and other public institutions." The report suggests that this be brought to the attention of the National Assembly. Further recommendations include increasing public awareness of the activities of the office and greater collaboration between the Auditor-General and the Public Protector, including the establishment of mechanisms to track and monitor referred matters.

In July 2013, it was reported that a letter dated 23 May 2013, addressed to Parliament by President Jacob Zuma, detailed a salary hike of R941 400 a year backdated for six-and-a-half years, a windfall of well over R6 million. The news was received with criticism.

== See also ==
- Comptroller and Auditor General
