= University of Transkei =

University in Mthatha, South Africa

The University of Transkei was a university in Umtata in the former bantustan of Transkei in South Africa. It was founded in 1976 as a branch of the University of Fort Hare and after the Transkei gained nominal independence in 1977, it became the University of Transkei. On 1 July 2005, the university merged with Border Technikon and Eastern Cape Technikon to become the Walter Sisulu University, named after anti-apartheid activist Walter Sisulu.

Well-known people associated with the university include Wiseman Nkuhlu, economic adviser to former President Thabo Mbeki and Advocate Tembeka Ngcukaitobi. Cartoonist Jonathan Shapiro was made an Honorary Doctor of Literature by the University in 2004. Author R.L. Peteni became Chancellor in 1989. Another former student was Noeleen Maholwana-Sangqu, the radio and TV talk show host and philanthropist.
