= 2020 DStv Mzansi Viewers' Choice Awards =

South African entertainment award ceremony

- Date: 14 March 2020
- Location: Ticketpro Dome, Johannesburg
- Hosted by: Minnie Dlamini
- Website: http://www.mzansimagic.tv/dstvmvca

Television/radio coverage
- Network: Mzansi Magic

The 2020 DStv Mzansi Viewers' Choice Awards were the 3rd annual DStv Magic Viewers Choice Awards that took place on March 14, 2020, at the Ticketpro Dome in Johannesburg. The event recognized the biggest achievements in television, radio, music, sports, and comedy in South Africa.

== Winners and Nominees ==
The nominations were announced on 28 November 2019, at the Multichoice Magic City in Randburg, Johannesburg.

=== Favourite Personality of the Year ===
Bonang Matheba

- Somizi Mhlongo
- Anele Mdoda
- Nomzamo Mbatha
- Sho Madjozi

=== Favourite Song of the Year ===
Prince Kaybee (featuring Indlovukazi, Supta and Afro Brotherz) – "Gugulethu"

- Kabza De Small, DJ Maphorisa and Njelic – "Nana Thula"
- Sjava – "Umama"
- Nasty C (featuring Rowlene) – "SMA"
- Kaygee DaKing & Bizizi (featuring Killer Kau) – "Kokota"

=== Favourite TV Presenter ===
Moshe Ndiki

- Nomsa Buthelezi

=== Favourite comedian ===
Siyanda Maphumulo

- Celeste Ntuli
- Skhumba Hlope

=== Favourite Rising Star ===
Kabza De Small

- Wiseman Mncube
- Simthandile ‘SimTiger’ Tshabalala
- Thato Moeng
- Larona Moagi

=== Favourite Radio Personality ===
- DJ Fresh
- Kgomotso Matsunyane
- Siphiwo ‘Spitch’ Nzawumbi
- Seipati ‘Twasa’ Seoke

Khathide ‘Tshatha’ Ngobe

=== Favourite Actor ===
- Molefi Monaisa
- Bheki Sibiya
- Presley Chweneyagae

Warren Masemola

- Masoja Msiza

=== Favourite Actress ===
Sindi Dlathu

- Dawn Thandeka King
- Zola Nombona
- Florence Masebe
- Tsholofelo Matshaba

=== Favourite Music Artist/Group ===
- King Monada won

=== Favourite DJ ===
Kabza De Small

- DJ Maphorisa
- DJ Speedsta
- DJ Sumbody

=== Favourite Sports Personality ===
Siya Kolisi

- Thembi Kgatlana
- Percy Tau
- Bongiwe Msomi
- Refiloe Jane

=== Ultimate Viewers' Choice Award ===
Khathide "Tshatha" Ngobe
