= Jeanne Goosen =

South African poet (1938–2020)

- Born: 13 July 1938; Parow, Cape Town
- Died: 3 June 2020 (aged 81); Melkbosstrand, Western Cape, South Africa
- Occupations: Writer, poet

Jeanne Goosen (13 July 1938 – 3 June 2020) was a South African journalist, poet and writer. She wrote short stories, children's books, plays and award-winning novels.

== Life ==
Jeanne Goosen was born in Parow, Cape Town. She studied at the University of Cape Town.

Goosen was a controversial writer in Afrikaans. She debuted in 1971 as a poet with Owl fly away, followed by Orrelpunte. Especially as a writer of prose she attained a prominent place in African literature. In We are not all like that, (translated into English by André Brink) life is illuminated by a white family from the lower middle class in the fifties, which gets involved in all sorts of problems. It is told from the perspective of the daughter, Gertie. The appearance caused a stir in South Africa because of the attention it drew to the existence of 'poor white'.

The novel Daantjie Dreamer (1993) is about a family from the 1950s. The narrator is the daughter Bubbles, who wants to free herself from the environment in which she grew up. Through her conversations with her philosophically inclined brother Daantjie Dreamer, she comes to new insights about political matters and she is aware of her own identity.

Goosen died 3 June 2020, in Melkbosstrand, near Cape Town.

== Works ==
- ’n Uil vlieg weg 1971 - (poetry)
- Orrelpunte 1975 - (poetry)
- Om ‘n mens na te boots 1975 -
- ’n Kat in die sak 1986 -
- Louoond 1987 -
- Ons is nie almal so nie 1990 -
- Daantjie Dromer 1993 -
- ’n Gelyke Kans 1995 - (short stories)
- Wie is Jan Hoender? 2001 - (novella)
- Straataf 2001 -
- 'n Pawpaw vir my darling. Kwela. 15 December 2006. ISBN 978-0-7957-0357-7.
- Desnieteenstaande 2003 - (cabaret)
- Plante kan praat. Kwela. 1 June 2010. ISBN 978-0-7957-0359-1.
- Ons is nie almal so nie. Kwela. 1 April 2012. ISBN 978-0-7957-0358-4.

=== Works in English ===
- Jeanne Goosen (15 August 2007). We're Not All Like That. Kwela. ISBN 978-0-7957-0436-9.
