= Clarence Mini =

South African doctor, medical researcher, social activist and human rights activist

- Born: Clarence Mazwangwandile Mini; 6 November 1951
- Died: 12 May 2020 (aged 68); Johannesburg, South Africa
- Education: Sofia Medical Academy
- Occupations: doctor, human rights activist, medical researcher
- Known for: fighting against apartheid and advocating the importance of eliminating HIV/AIDS from South Africa
- Spouse: Nancy Mini
- Children: 5

Clarence Mazwangwandile Mini (6 November 1951 – 12 May 2020) was a South African doctor, anti-apartheid activist, freedom fighter, human rights activist. Mini was regarded as a pioneer of the medical industry in South Africa, especially for his crucial contributions in eliminating the HIV/AIDS from the country. He also actively advocated against apartheid during his career and also voiced against corruption which mounted during the presidency of Jacob Zuma. He served on the Board of Healthcare Funders, at times as its chair. He died on 12 May 2020 due to COVID-19 complications at the age of 68 while serving as the chairperson of the Council of Medical Schemes. His term as chairperson of CMS was due to end by September 2020.

== Career ==
Mini joined the fight against apartheid at the age of 25 and spent most of his life fighting for the rights of black Africans. In 1976, he secretly left South Africa to safeguard himself from apartheid and pursued his higher studies in the field of medicine in Bulgaria. He graduated from the Sofia Medical Academy in 1986 and became a qualified professional doctor after training while in exile. Mini's achievement was lauded among the Black Africans community, as it was treated as a rare milestone among black community at a time when apartheid was in effect. He also joined the armed wing of the African National Congress, uMkhonto we Sizwe and received his military training in Angola. He also lived and worked in Swaziland (since 2018 renamed to Eswatini), Tanzania, Zambia, Zimbabwe and Australia while in exile prior to his return to South Africa.

He returned to South Africa in the 1990s after the end of apartheid which also saw the release of freedom fighters including Nelson Mandela. He obtained a diploma in community medicine from the Stellenbosch University in 1993 and a diploma in Palliative Care at the University of Cape Town in 2002.

His return to South Africa was crucial when the country was confronted with AIDS epidemic which was at its peak and he pioneered the fight to combat the spread of the AIDS virus. He also co-chaired the first national meeting of organisations at Nasrec in 1992 highlighting the importance of tackling HIV. Mini also faced a backlash for his statements about HIV/AIDS by many members of the African National Congress, as most facts regarding the virus were denied by the African National Congress. Mini along with his wife Nancy opened an HIV clinic in Germiston and started treating patients with AIDS for free when Thabo Mbeki served as the President of the country from 1999 to 2008, who consistently denied the spread of AIDS and refused to distribute life saving antiretroviral medicine to treat patients living with AIDS. He was appointed chairperson of Council of Medical Schemes in 2010 by the then minister of health, Aaron Motsoaledi.

Mini also pioneered the fight against corruption which was evident and rampant during the presidency of Jacob Zuma and headed the investigations on health insurance industry amid allegations of corrupt ties between the council officials of the Council of Medical Schemes and related firms.

== Death ==
Mini was admitted to the hospital in Johannesburg on 28 March 2020 after falling ill with a prolonged asthma. He was admitted to the hospital a day after the South African government imposed a nationwide lockdown due to the COVID-19 pandemic in South Africa. His test reports initially reported negative for the coronavirus. However he tested positive for COVID-19 and died on 12 May 2020 at the age of 68 after being hospitalized for more than a month.

Ricardo Mahlakanya, Spokesperson of the Office of Health Standards Compliance, led the tributes from the front calling him a "champion in the fight against the HIV epidemic[.] Mini was a great servant of the nation in the medical fraternity, steadfast and always shared the utmost insight in the field with anyone he would strike a conversation with". Gauteng Health MEC Bandile Masuku stated that the "health sector lost a foot soldier who was a tireless champion of universal health coverage for all". Health minister Zweli Mkhize also attended the funeral, adding that "Mini was a true patriot who loved South Africa".

His funeral was attended by only 50 people due to pandemic-related restrictions imposed by the government.

== See also ==
- Gita Ramjee
