= Gita Ramjee =

Ugandan-South African medical researcher (1956–2020)

- Born: Gita Parekh; 8 April 1956; Kampala, Uganda Protectorate
- Died: 31 March 2020 (aged 63); Umhlanga, outside Durban, South Africa
- Education: University of Sunderland; University of KwaZulu-Natal
- Known for: HIV research Microbicides
- Spouse: Pravin Ramjee
- Scientific career
- Fields: Medicine, Pediatrics, HIV
- Workplaces: South African Medical Research Council

Gita Ramjee FRCPE (née Parekh; 8 April 1956 – 31 March 2020) was a Ugandan-South African scientist and researcher in HIV prevention. In 2018, she was awarded the ‘Outstanding Female Scientist’ award from the European and Developing Countries Clinical Trials Partnership. She died in uMhlanga, South Africa, from COVID-19 related complications.

== Early life and education ==
Gita Parekh was born on 8 April 1956 and grew up in Colonial Uganda before her family were driven into exile under Idi Amin in the 1970s. She attended high school in India before attending the University of Sunderland in England. She graduated in 1980 with a BSc (Hons) in chemistry and physiology. She married a South African-Indian fellow student, Praveen Ramjee, and moved to Durban where she began working in the Department of Paediatrics at the Medical School of the University of KwaZulu-Natal. After her two sons were born she completed her master's, and subsequently a PhD in 1994.

== Career ==
After completing her PhD in kidney diseases of childhood, Ramjee joined the South African Medical Research Council as a scientist. She rose rapidly through the ranks to head the largest unit of the Council, the HIV Prevention Research Unit. She helped expand the unit from 22 scientific staff to 350 and was instrumental in growing its international reputation.

At the time of her death, Ramjee was the Chief Scientific Officer at the Aurum Institute, a not-for-profit AIDS/Tuberculosis research organisation, as well as director of the South African Medical Research Council's Prevention Research Unit. She received the Lifetime Achievement Award at the International Microbicide Conference in 2012. She was an honorary professor at the London School of Hygiene & Tropical Medicine, the University of Washington in Seattle, and the University of Cape Town. She was a member of a number of local and international committees including the Academy of Science of South Africa (ASSAf) and the South African National AIDS Council (SANAC).

== Research ==
Her specialisation in HIV prevention and treatment research led her to lead the expansion of phase I through phase III HIV prevention and treatment clinical trials in the greater Durban area as the Clinical Trials Unit Principal Investigator. Ramjee was concerned that the focus should not only be on clinical trials but treatment accompanied by HIV prevention education and care. In an interview she stated, “Women are the hardest hit by HIV in this region, and there is still a lot to do to address health issues in developing countries. There is a need for [a] more holistic approach to HIV prevention which should include reproductive health care for women.” Ramjee was one of the first South African scientists to work on developing microbicides.

She received the 2017 MRC Scientific Merit Award gold medal.

As an academic, she published more than 170 articles and was both a reviewer and editor of several scientific journals.

== Death ==
Ramjee was in London to deliver a lecture at the London School of Hygiene & Tropical Medicine on 17 March 2020, entitled 'HIV: diverse challenges among children and women in Asia and Africa'. On her return to South Africa she felt unwell and was hospitalised. She died from complications relating to COVID-19.

David Mabuza, deputy president of South Africa, led the tributes calling her a "champion in the fight against the HIV epidemic." As the chairperson of the South African National AIDS Council, he stated: "The passing of Professor Ramjee comes as a huge blow to the entirety of the healthcare sector and the global fight against HIV/AIDS." Salim Abdool Karim, director of the Centre for the Aids Programme of Research in South Africa, praised her work for women, saying "She was involved in almost every major HIV prevention trial on microbicide … and defined her niche in developing technologies for women." The president of the South African Medical Research Centre, Glenda Gray, also paid tribute to her work "She tried to address the whole ecosystem that makes women vulnerable, from the biological to the political."

The Gita Ramjee Prize is awarded by the Aurum Institute in her memory to female scientists in the field of HIV prevention.
