= Timeline of South Africa =

This is a timeline of the history of the area in present-day South Africa.

Pre-colonial era	→	The Dutch Cape Colony	→	The British Cape Colony	→	The Great Trek	→	The Boer Republics	→	Union of South Africa	→	Apartheid	→	The Rainbow Nation

== Pre-colonial era ==
=== ~4 000 000 BP ===
- Australopithecus arrives in South Africa.

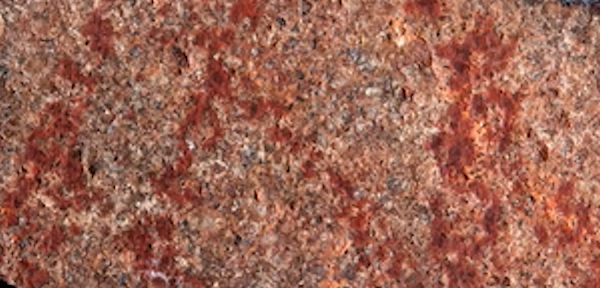
An ochre crayon drawing is claimed to be the oldest known drawing, discovered in Blombos Cave. Estimated to be 73 000 years old

=== ~2 500 000 BP ===
- Australopithecus africanus arrives in South Africa, of which Mrs. Ples and the Taung Child are the most famous fossils.

=== ~1 500 000 BP ===
- Homo ergaster arrives in South Africa.

=== ~200 000 BP ===
- The Border Cave is occupied, with the oldest sedimentary ash and grass bedding found here.

=== ~170 000 BP ===
- Homo sapiens arrive in South Africa.

=== 117 000 BP ===
- The oldest known human footprints, Eve's footprint, is left on the shore of Langebaan Lagoon.

=== 73 000 BP ===
- The earliest known rock drawing is made with ochre crayon in the Blombos Cave.
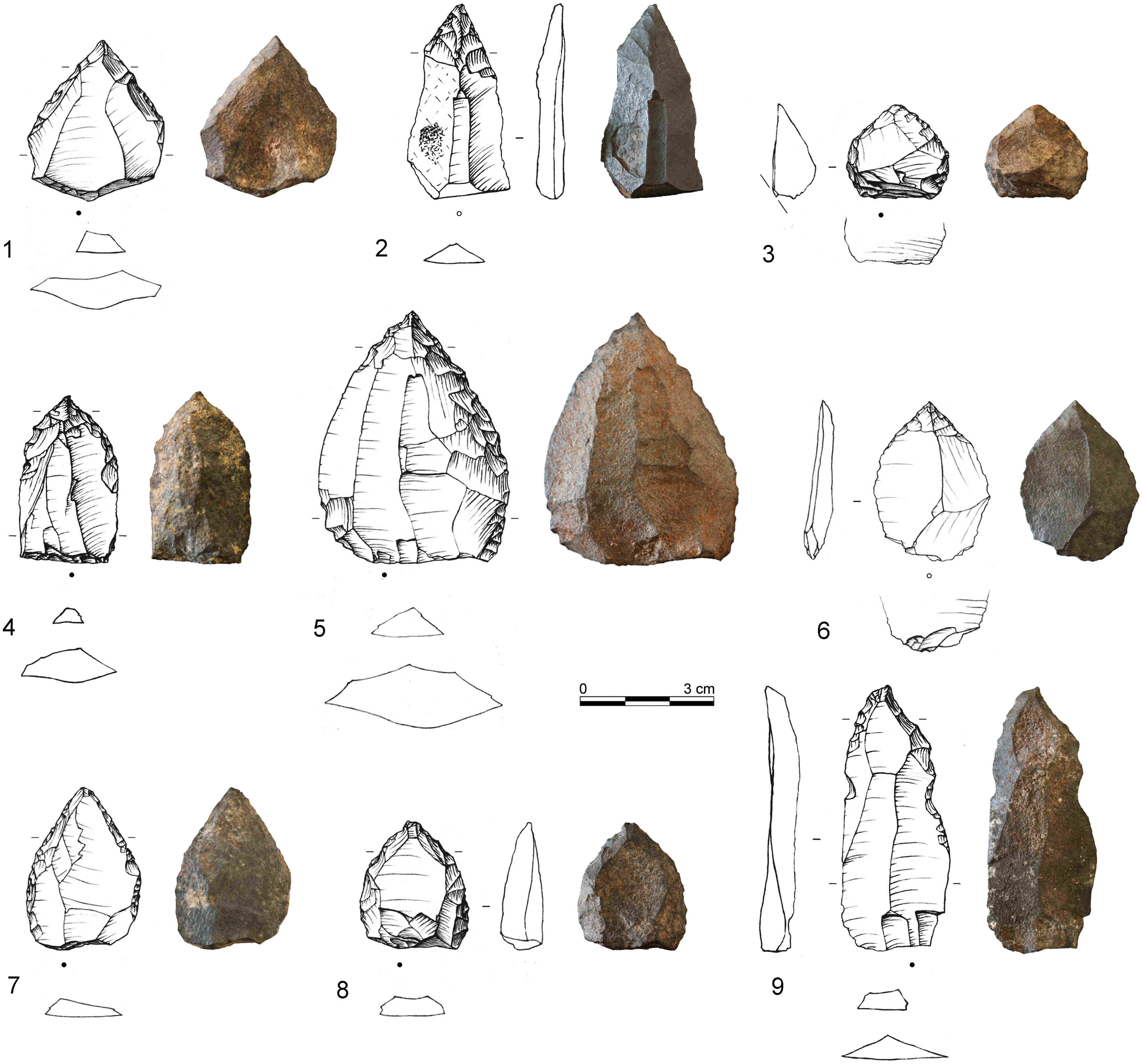
  Lithic tools from the Sibudu Cave

=== 61 000 BP ===
- The earliest bone and stone arrows are left at the Sibudu Cave, along with the earliest needle, and earliest use of heat-treated mixed compound gluing.

=== 60 000 BP ===
- Howieson's Poort Shelter is occupied.

=== ~15 000 BP ===
- The San people arrive in South Africa.

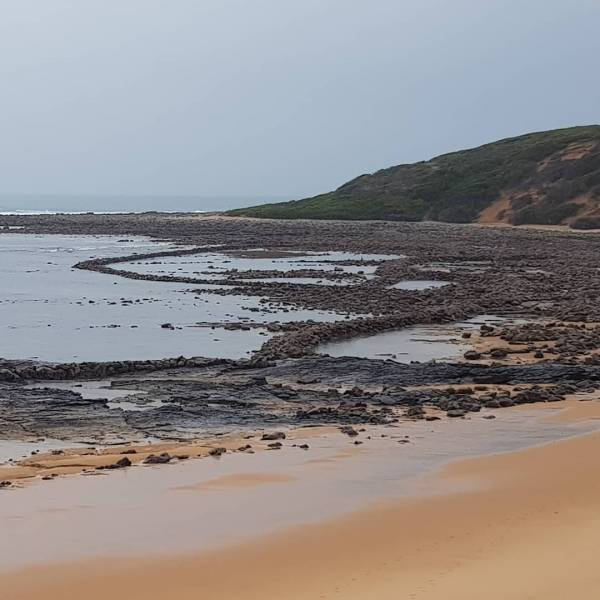
Noordkapperpunt stone-walled fish traps

=== ~3 000 BP ===
- Stilbaai Tidal Fish Traps are made on the coast of Stilbaai.

=== ~2 200 BP ===
- The Khoikhoi people arrive in South Africa.

=== ~200 CE ===
- The Bantu peoples of South Africa arrive in South Africa.
- Start of the Iron Age in South Africa.

=== 249 ===
- Beginning of agriculture in South Africa.

=== ~800 ===
- Start of the mass Bantu migration. The Khoisan people are driven by the Bantu to the dry corners of the continent.

=== 300 ===
- Early Iron Age communities are established in the northern and eastern regions of Southern Africa.

=== 500 ===
- A group of Bantu-speaking tribes migrate southwards and reach present-day KwaZulu-Natal.

=== 696 ===
- The Lemba people interact with Arab traders.

=== ~1000 ===
- Founding of the Bantu Kingdom of Mapungubwe in the Limpopo.

=== 1400 ===
- Founding of the capital settlement of Kweneng by the Sotho-Tswana people in what is now the Suikerbosrand Nature Reserve, south of Johannesburg.

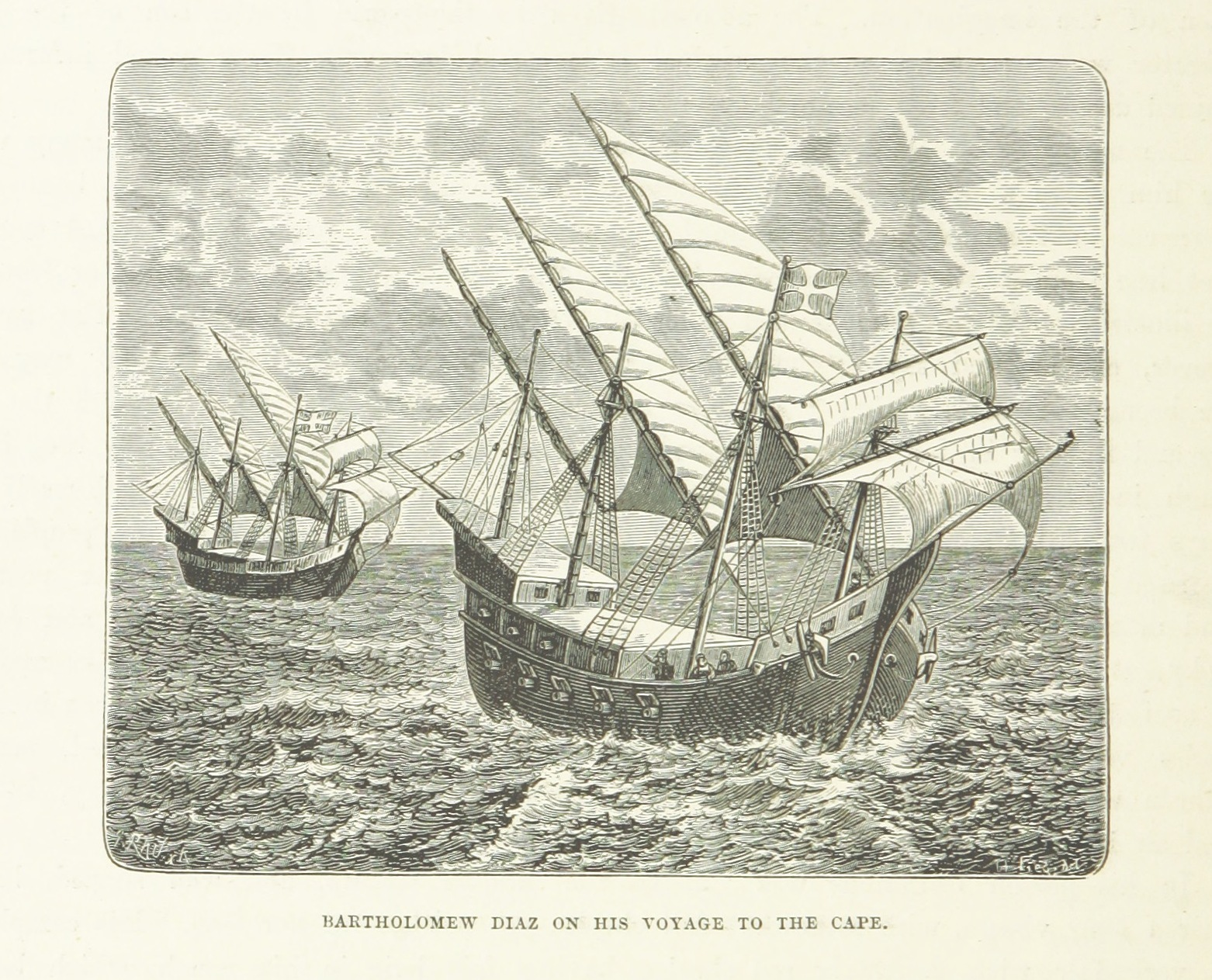
The São Cristóvão and the São Pantaleão of Bartolomeu Dias

=== 1488 ===
- The Portuguese explorer Bartolomeu Dias becomes the first European to reach the Cape of Good Hope.

=== 1497 ===
- The Portuguese explorer Vasco da Gama circumnavigates the Cape of Good Hope and discovers Natal on Christmas Eve.

=== 1501 ===
- Portuguese navigator Pêro de Ataíde left an account of losing much of his fleet in a storm at the Post Office Tree.

=== 1503 ===
- The Portuguese explorer António de Saldanha reaches Table Bay and explores Table Mountain.
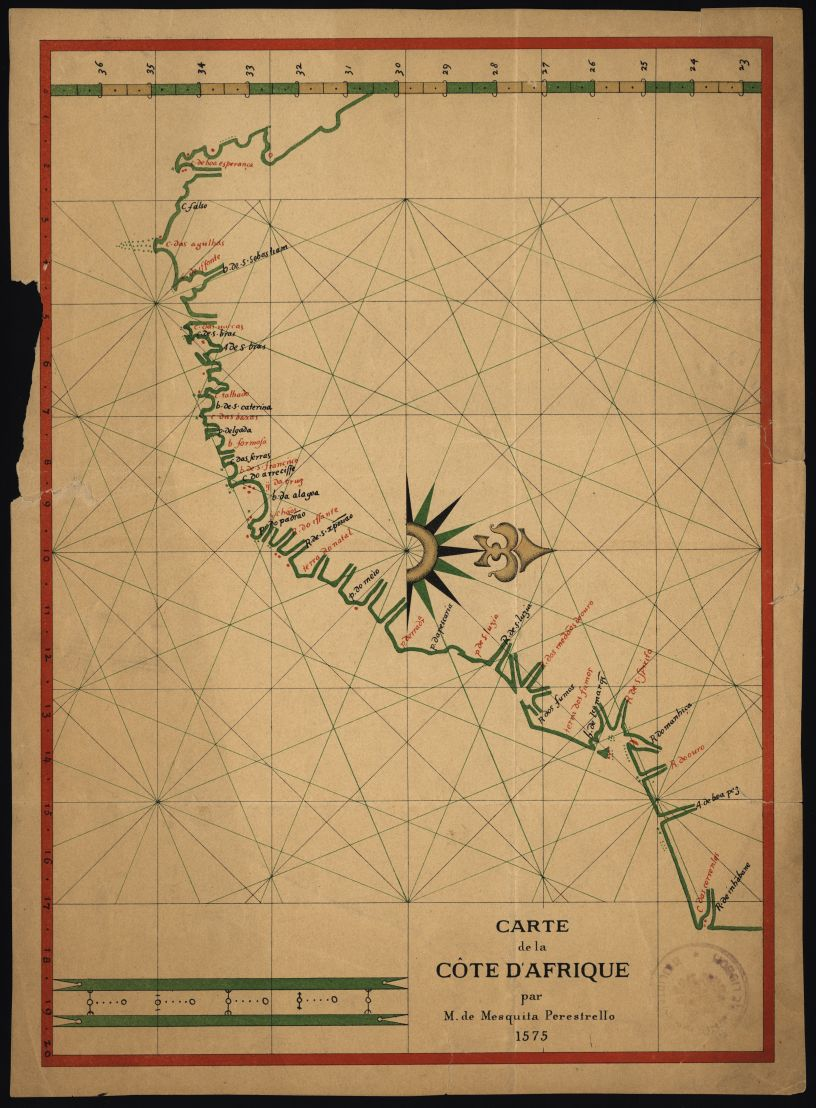
  1575 map of the Southern African coastline from Cape of Good Hope to Inhambane

=== 1510 ===
- At Table Bay, the Khoikhoi come to blows with the Portuguese. Portuguese explorer Francisco de Almeida and 64 Portuguese sailors are killed. This becomes the first military encounter between Europeans and indigenous South Africa people.

=== 1575 ===
- The Portuguese cartographer Manuel de Mesquita Perestrelo makes a first attempt to map the coast of South Africa.

=== 1580 ===
- Sir Francis Drake circumnavigates the Cape of Good Hope.

=== 1647 ===
- The Dutch ship Nieuwe Haerlem runs aground at the Cape of Good Hope. Under the leadership of Leendert Janszen, the stranded Dutch seamen stay at the Cape for a year. After their return to the Netherlands, Leendert Janszen and Matthijs Proot are commissioned by the Dutch East India Company (VOC) to write a report on their findings on the feasibility of the Cape as a refreshment station.

=== 1649 ===
- Leendert Janszen and Matthijs Proot submit their Remonstrantie, which describes their positive findings of the Cape of Good Hope. Jan van Riebeeck, who was on the ship that rescued the two, was asked to comment on the Remonstrantie and responded positively. The Gentlemen Seventeen, the board of the VOC, then decide that a refreshment station should be established at the Cape.

== The Dutch Cape Colony ==
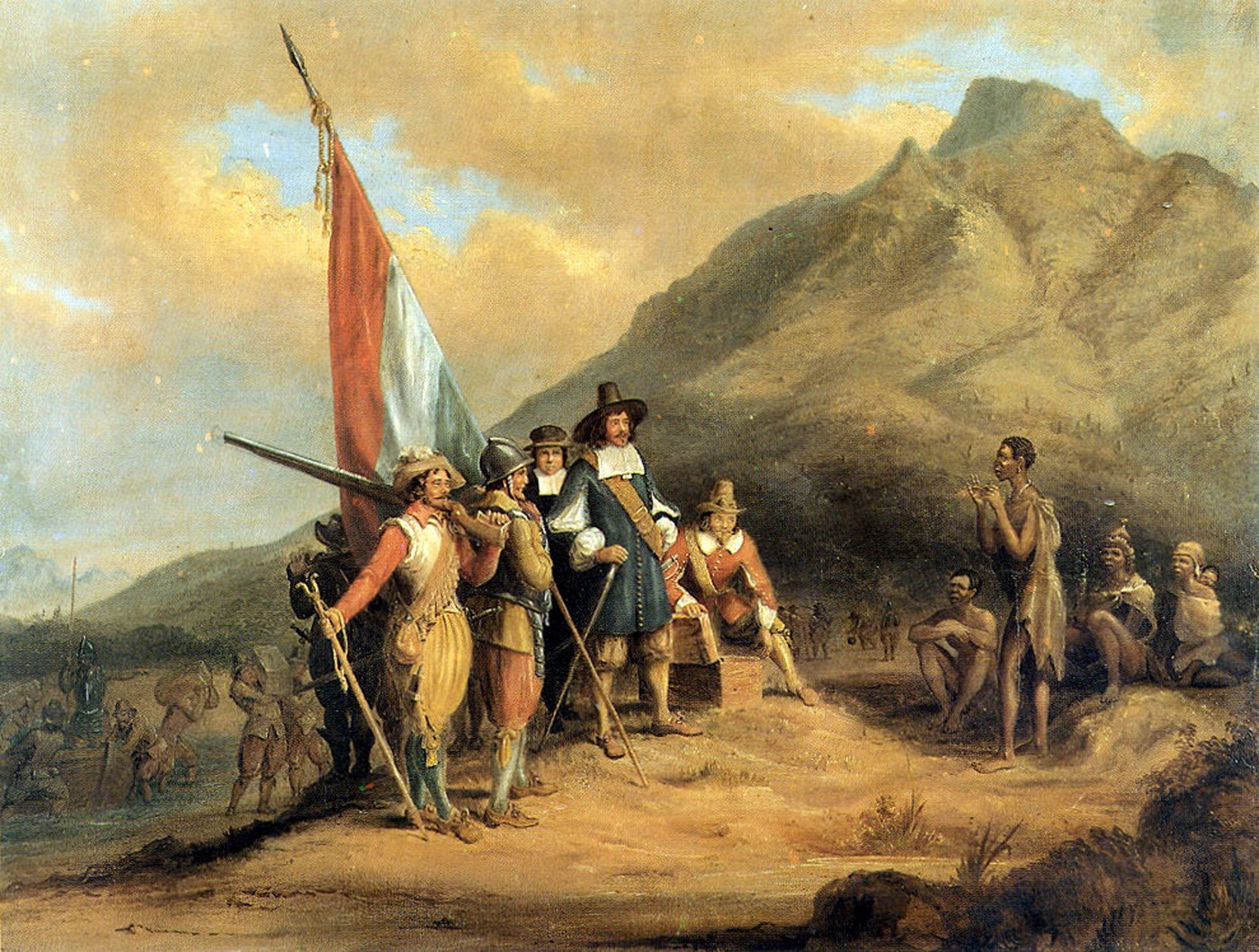
Jan van Riebeeck's arrival at the Cape of Good Hope

=== 1652 ===
- Jan van Riebeeck founded the Cape Town refreshment station on behalf of the VOC. Beginnings of the Dutch Cape Colony.
- Bernert Willemsz Wijlant is the first white child born in South Africa.
- The Company's Garden opens as South Africa's oldest garden.

=== 1655 ===
- Beginnings of maize and viticulture in South Africa.

=== 1657 ===
- The first European farmers arrive in Rondebosch.

=== 1658 ===
- The first slaves are deposited in the Cape Colony by the Dutch. Some of them being the first Muslims in South Africa.

=== 1659 ===
- The First Khoikhoi-Dutch War breaks out. (Then still called strandlopers by the Dutch)

=== 1660 ===
- Van Riebeeck's Hedge of indigenous wild almond is planted.

=== 1663 ===
- The Prince Edward Islands are discovered.

=== 1664 ===
- This is the first recorded crossing of Sir Lowry's Pass into the interior.

=== 1665 ===
- Foundation of the Dutch Reformed Church of South Africa.

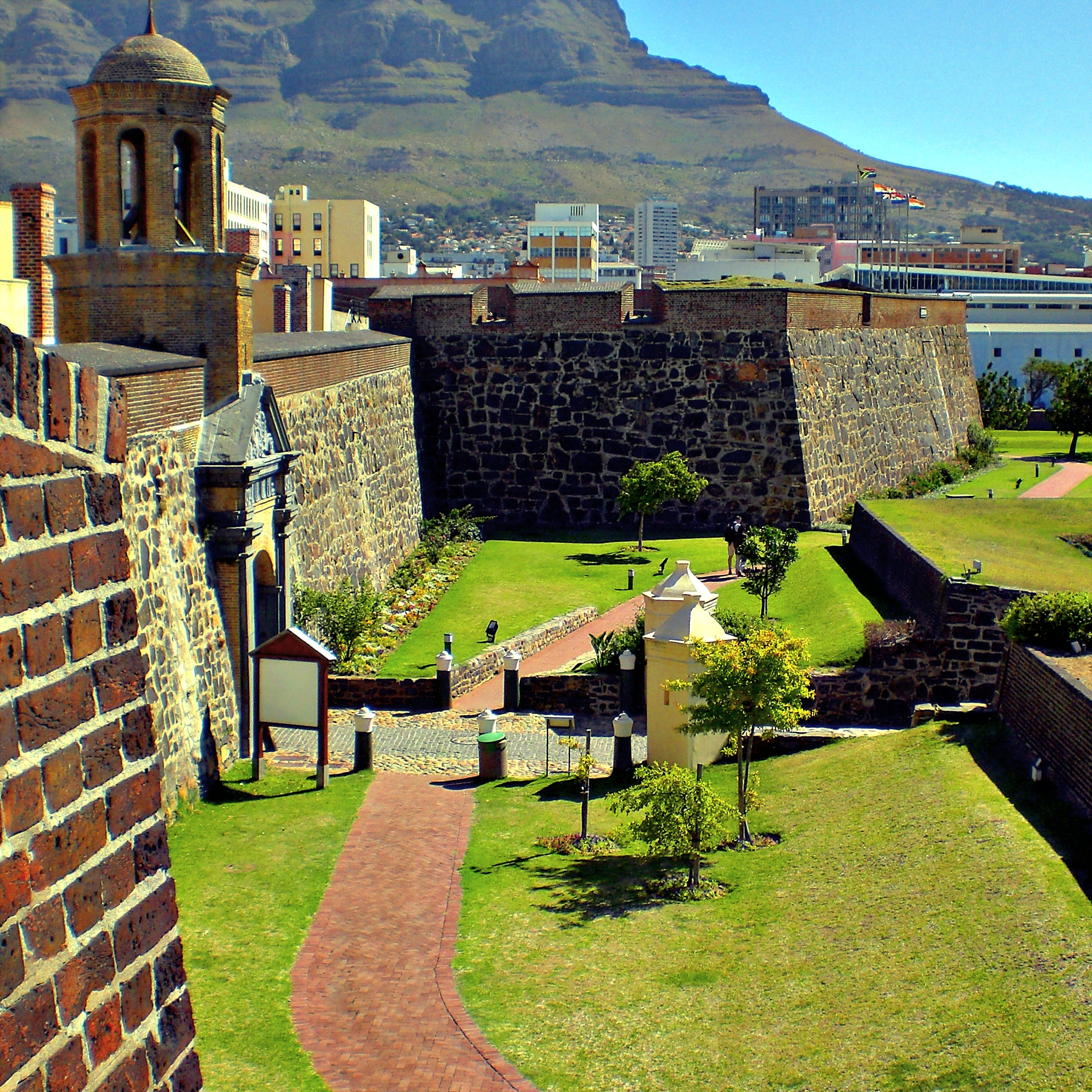
Castle of Good Hope

=== 1666 ===
- Start of construction on Castle of Good Hope.

=== 1673 ===
- The Second Khoikhoi–Dutch War breaks out. (After their click language, the strandlopers are now called the racial term, hottentots).

=== 1679 ===
- Governor Simon van der Stel founds Stellenbosch.

=== 1682 ===
- The Tuynhuys is built which would later become the Cape Town office of the President of South Africa.

=== 1685 ===
- Cape Governor Simon van der Stel gives settlers land near the Boschendal farm.
- Groot Constantia is built; becoming the oldest colonial manor house in South Africa.

=== 1687 ===
- Paarl is established as the third-oldest town in South Africa.

=== 1688 ===
- The first Huguenots arrive in the Cape Colony and found Franschhoek.

=== 1701 ===
- Koopmans-de Wet House is built; becoming the oldest house museum in South Africa.

Expansion of the Cape Colony

=== 1706 ===
- The Free Burgher Adam Tas files a complaint against Governor Willem Adriaan van der Stel and is imprisoned.

=== 1713 ===
- A smallpox epidemic strikes the Cape Colony; many khoikhoi die from this.

=== 1751 ===
- Governor Hendrik Swellengrebel founds Swellendam.

=== 1755 ===
- A second smallpox epidemic strikes the Cape Colony.

=== 1761 ===
- Governor Rijk Tulbagh establishes South Africa's first library.

=== 1767 ===
- A third smallpox epidemic strikes the Cape Colony.

=== 1773 ===
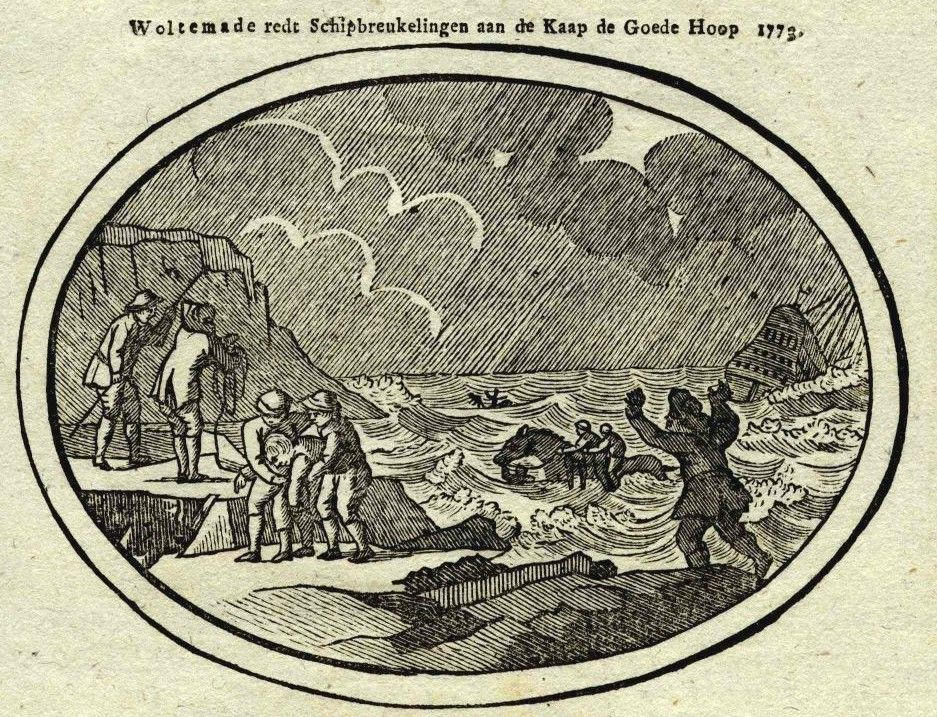
18th century drawing depicting Wolraad Woltemade's rescue of 14 sailors

- Cape farmer Wolraad Woltemade drowns after rescuing 14 castaways.

=== 1779 ===
- The First of the Xhosa Wars breaks out between the Dutch and the Xhosa.
- Dutch explorer Robert Jacob Gordon names the Orange River after the House of Orange-Nassau.

=== 1780 ===
- The Great Fish River is designated as the boundary of the Cape Colony.

=== 1781 ===
- A French fleet prevents the British conquest of the Cape Colony.

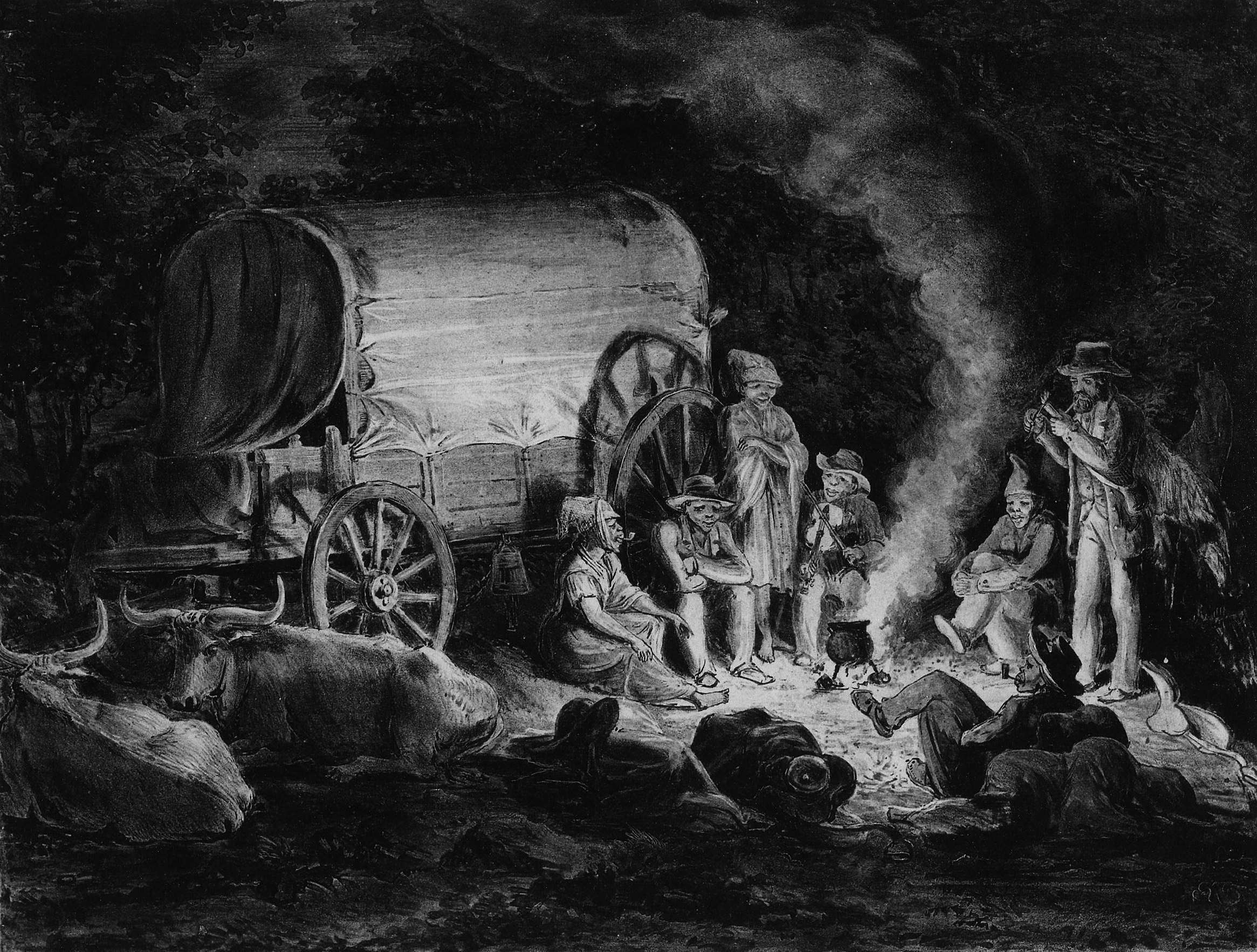
Depiction of a Griqua outspan expedition.

=== 1784 ===
- The Griqua cross the Gariep (Orange River) to the north under the leadership of Captain Cornelius Kok I.

=== 1786 ===
- The founding of Graaff-Reinet.

=== 1789 ===
- The Second of the Xhosa Wars breaks out.
- The Merino sheep is imported to the Cape Colony.

=== 1792 ===
- Johan Isaac Rhenius opens a post office in a room next to the pantry at the Castle of Good Hope. This was the start of what becomes the South African Post Office.

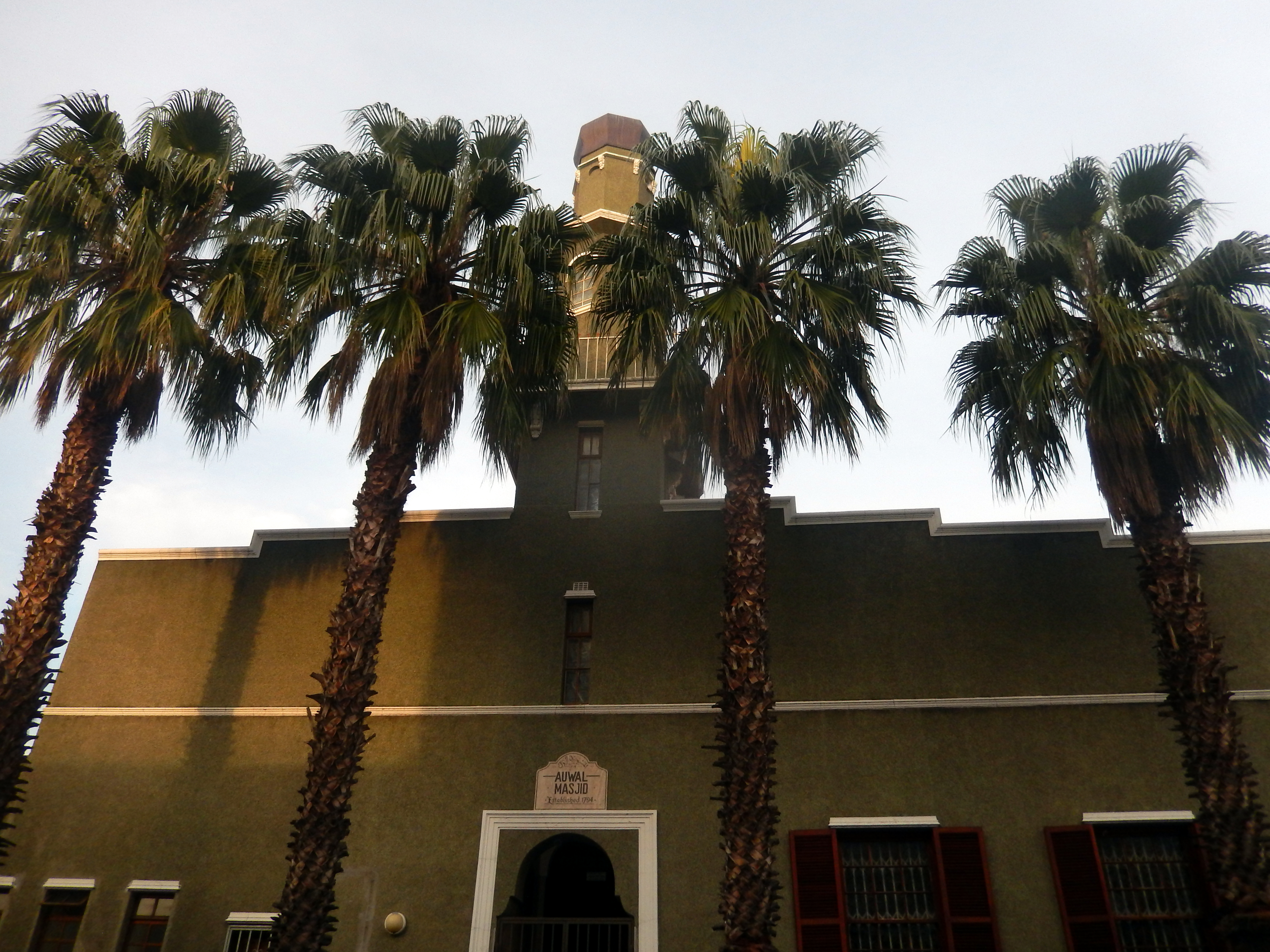
Auwal Mosque in Bo-Kaap (Malay Quarter) in Cape Town.

=== 1794 ===
- The Auwal Mosque is founded in Bo-Kaap. It is South Africa's first mosque.

== The British Cape Colony ==
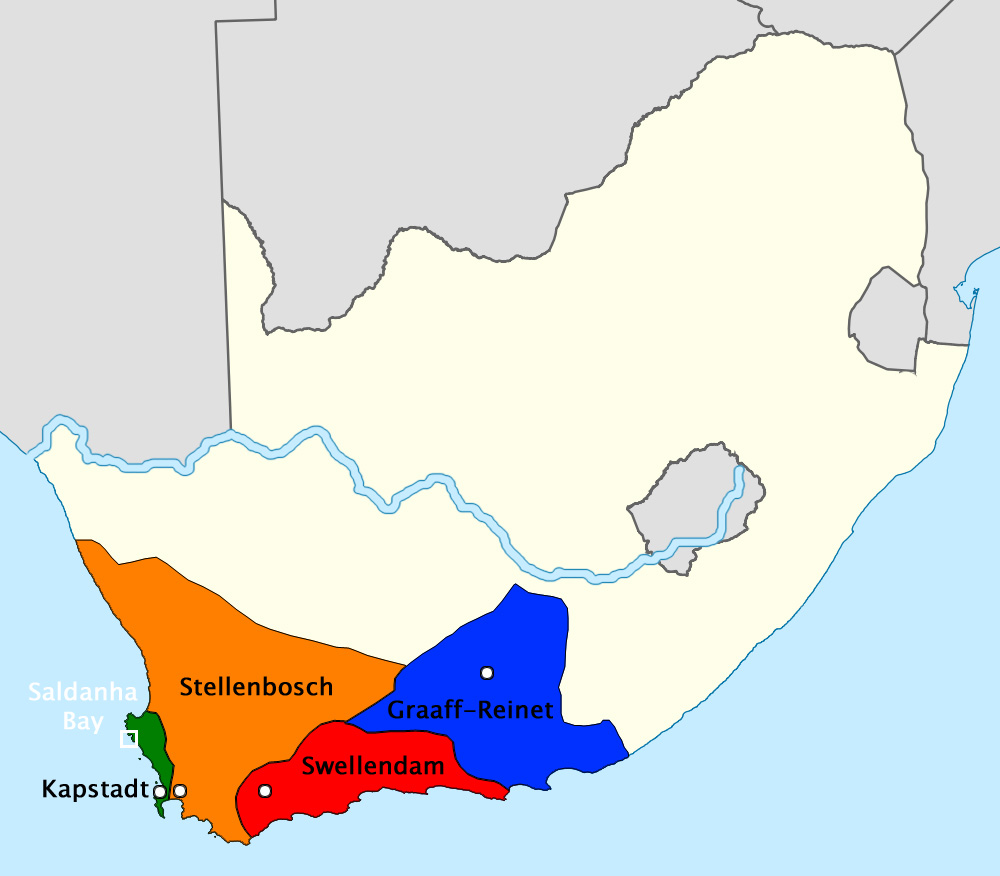
The Cape Colony in 1795

=== 1795 ===
- The United Kingdom captures the Cape Colony from the Netherlands in the Battle of Muizenberg. The Republic of Graaff-Reinet and Republic of Swellendam rebel but are annexed by the British Cape Colony.

=== 1799 ===
- The London Missionary Society sends missionaries to South Africa.
- The Third of the Xhosa Wars breaks out.

=== 1803 ===
- Peace of Amiens. The United Kingdom transfers the Cape Colony back to the Netherlands.

=== 1804 ===
- Governor Jacob Abraham Uitenhage de Mist founds Uitenhage.

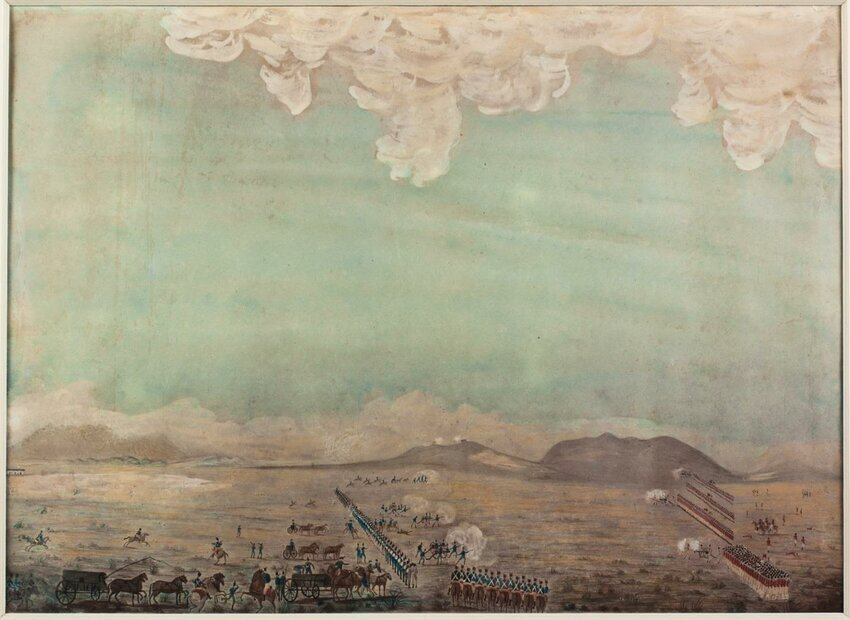
The Battle of Blaauwberg

=== 1806 ===
- The United Kingdom conquers the Cape Colony from the Netherlands in the Battle of Blaauwberg, this time definitively.

=== 1807 ===
- The slave trade to South Africa is abolished, but slavery remains legal.

=== 1808 ===
- The first-ever recorded cricket match in South Africa takes place.

=== 1809 ===
- The Hottentot Proclamation is a decree by the 2nd Earl of Caledon aimed at restricting the mobility of Khoikhoi in the Cape Colony.

=== 1810 ===
- The Khoikhoi woman Saartjie Baartman is exhibited in London out of interest of her physique.

=== 1811 ===
- The Fourth of the Xhosa Wars breaks out.

=== 1812 ===
- Founding of Cradock and Grahamstown.

=== 1813 ===
- The Griqua found Griqualand West.

=== 1815 ===
- Rebellious Boers revolt against the British government at Slagtersnek, but are defeated.

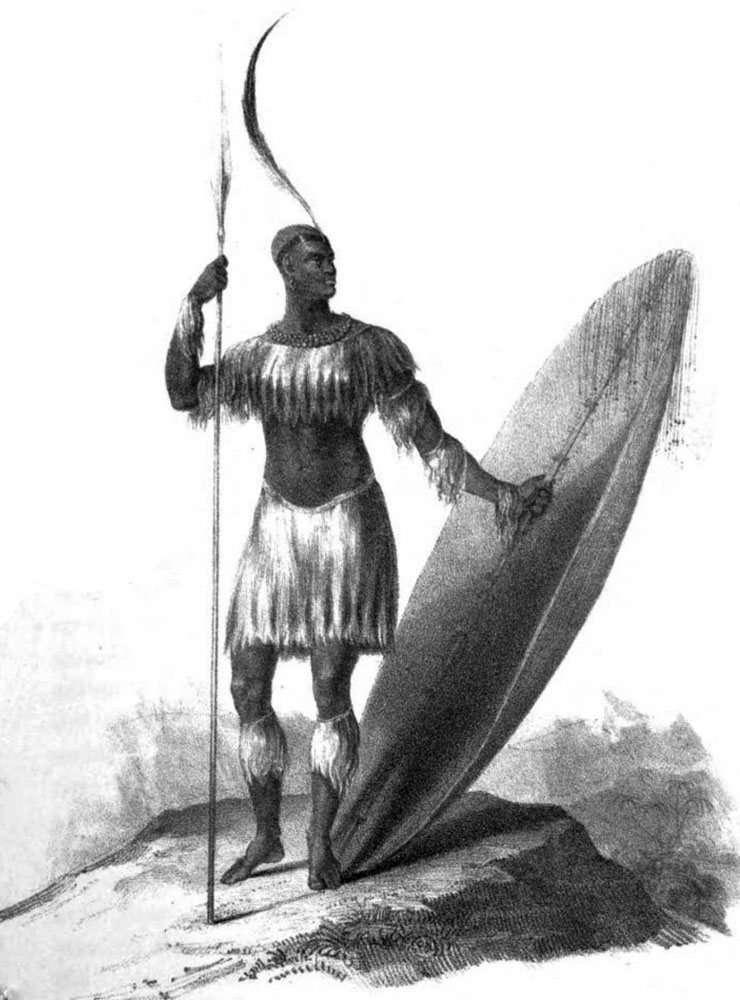
The Zulu King Shaka

=== 1816 ===
- Five of the Slagtersnek insurgents are hanged in dramatic circumstances.
- Shaka founds the Zulu Kingdom.

=== 1818 ===
- The Mthethwa king Dingiswayo is killed by the Ndwandwe king Zwide. The power vacuum is filled by the Zulu king Shaka.
- The Fifth of the Xhosa Wars breaks out.

=== 1819 ===
- The Zulus defeat the Ndwandwe in the Ndwandwe–Zulu War.

This map illustrates the rise of the Zulu Empire under Shaka (1816–1828) in present-day South Africa. The rise of the Zulu Empire under Shaka forced other chiefdoms and clans to flee across a wide area of southern Africa. Clans fleeing the Zulu war zone included the Soshangane, Zwangendaba, Ndebele, Hlubi, Ngwane, and the Mfengu. .

=== 1820 ===
- Beginning of the Mfecane.
- The Griqua captain Adam Kok II leaves Griqualand West and is succeeded by Andries Waterboer of the San. The Bergenaars split off from the Griqua.
- Thousands of 1820s British settlers arrive in the Cape Colony.
- Founding of Port Elizabeth.
- The South African Astronomical Observatory is established as the Royal Observatory, Cape of Good Hope.

=== 1822 ===
- Founding of Lesotho by Moshoeshoe I.
- The Dutch language is abolished in the civil service and court of the Cape Colony.

=== 1823 ===
- Lieutenant Mzilikazi refuses to give up his loot to the Zulu king Shaka. He flees with his followers over the Drakensberg and conquers the Transvaal. Expansion of the Mfecane and rise of the Northern Ndebele people.
- The Oorlam people, led by Jonker Afrikaner, leave for south-west Africa.
- The missionary John Philip founds Philippolis, the first European settlement of the Transorangia.

=== 1824 ===
- Founding of Port Natal, later called Durban.
- The Zulu king Shaka comes into contact with the white settlers.
- The South African Commercial Advertiser starts publication in Cape Town as South Africa's first independent newspaper.

=== 1825 ===
- The South African pound is introduced in the Cape Colony.
- The Iziko South African Museum is founded. It moved to the company's Garden in 1897.

=== 1828 ===
- The Zulu king Shaka is killed by his half-brother Dingane, who succeeds him as king.

=== 1829 ===
- The University of Cape Town is founded as the South African College.

=== 1830 ===
- Afrikaans is first written in Arabic.

=== 1832 ===
- The Matabele king Mzilikazi is driven west by Dingane.

=== 1834 ===
- Abolition of slavery in the Cape Colony.
- The Sixth of the Xhosa Wars breaks out.

== The Great Trek ==
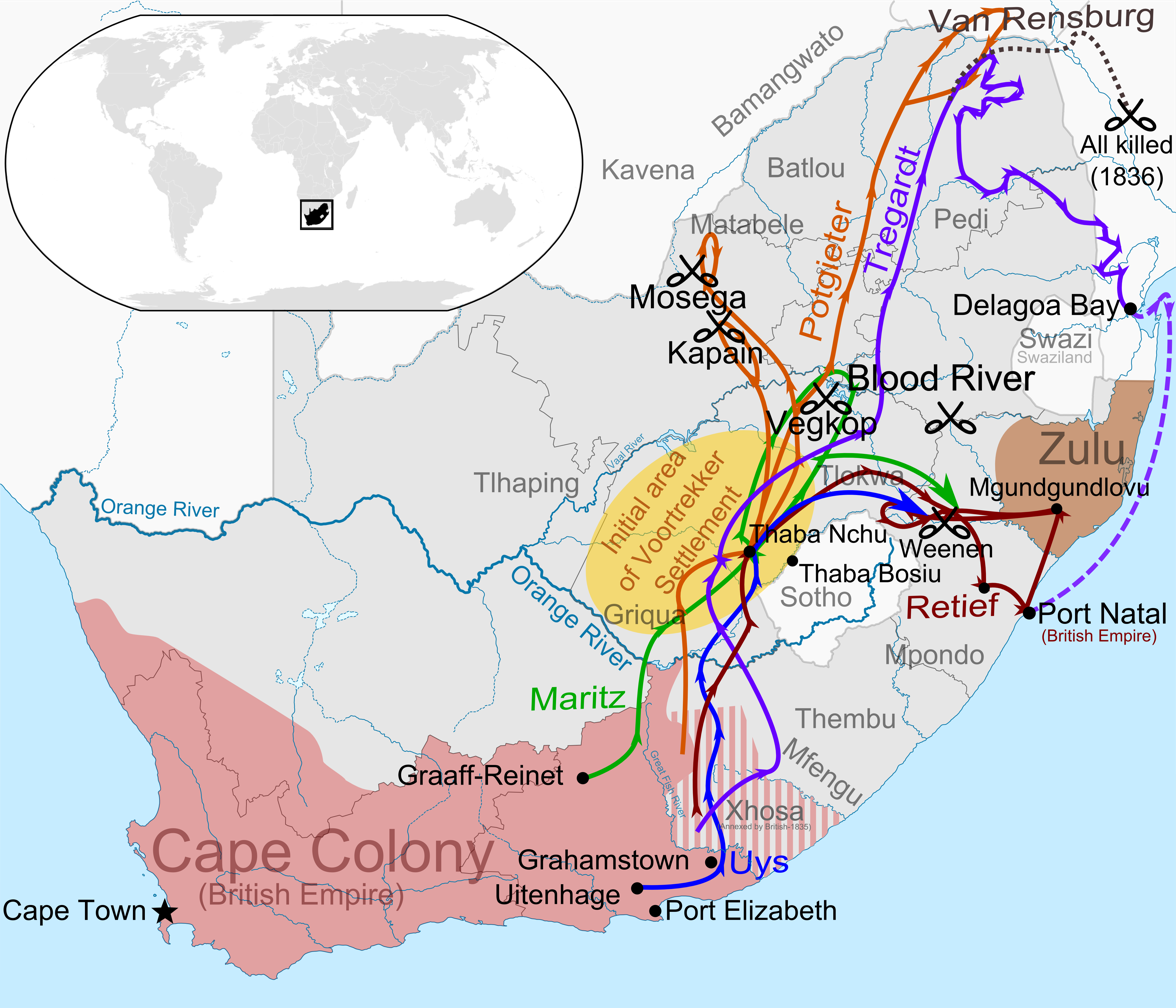
Map of The Great Trek

=== 1835 ===
- The Great Trek begins. The Voortrekkers Louis Tregardt and Hans van Rensburg leave the Cape Colony with their followers.
- Founding of British Kaffraria.

=== 1836 ===
- More Voortrekkers leave the Cape Colony. Mzilikazi sends his army against them, but is defeated at the Battle of Vegkop.
- The Voortrekkers led by Hans van Rensburg are murdered in what is now Mozambique.

=== 1837 ===
- Mzilikazi is driven out of the Transvaal by the Voortrekkers led by Hendrik Potgieter. He founds the Kingdom of Mthwakazi in modern-day Zimbabwe.

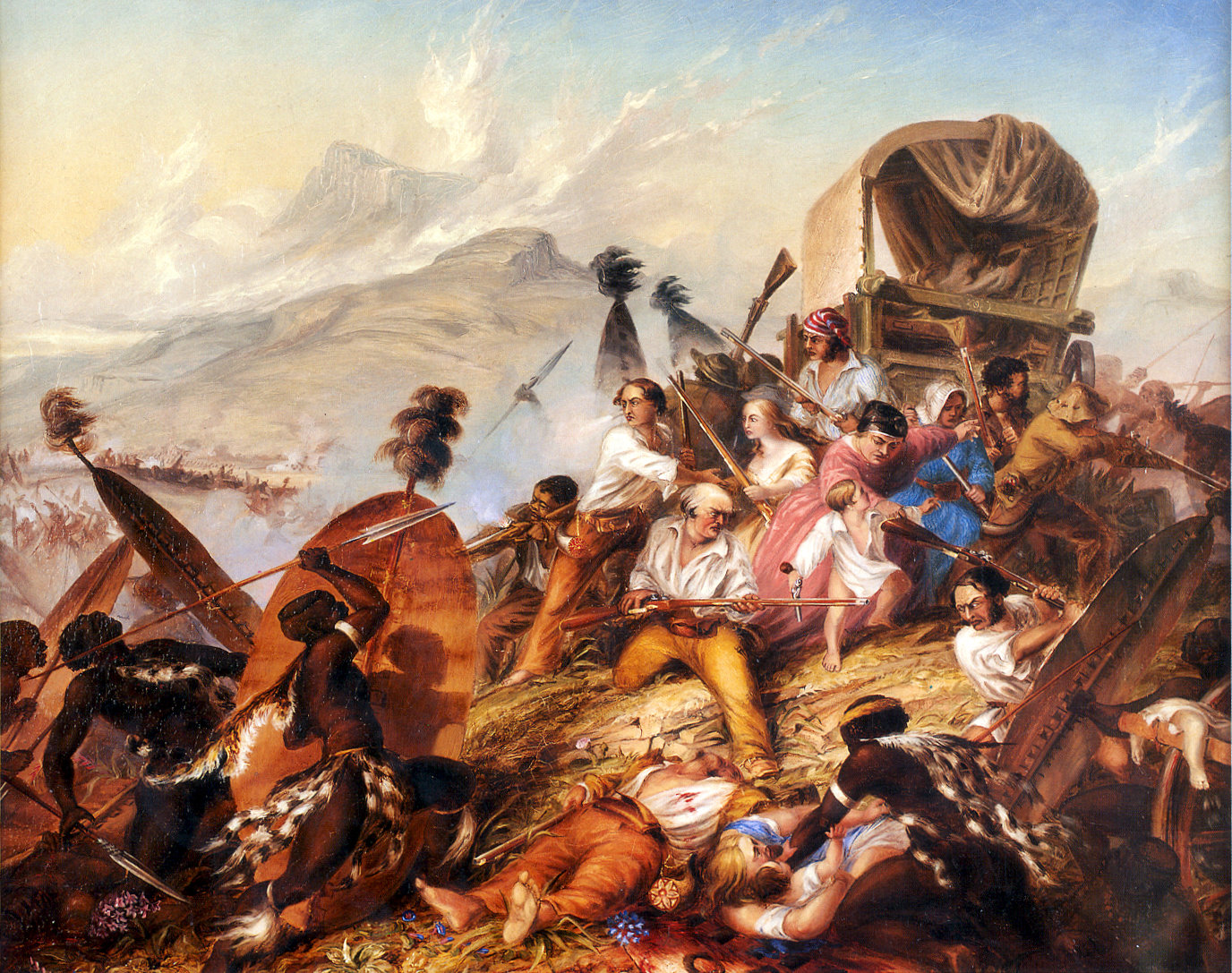
Weenen massacre

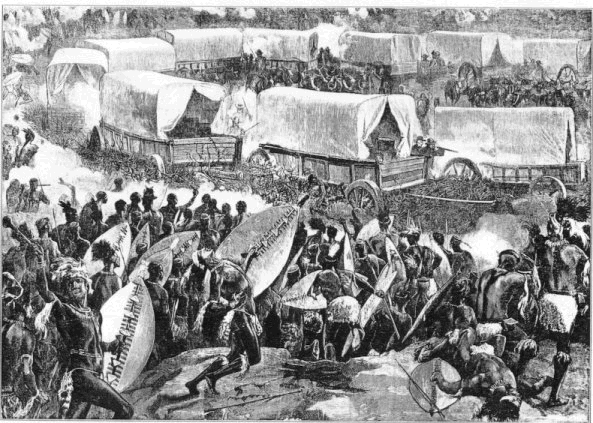
The Battle of Blood River

=== 1838 ===
- The Voortrekker Piet Retief is murdered by the Zulu king Dingane; 532 of Retief's followers are killed in the Weenen massacre.
- The Voortrekker Piet Uys is killed in the Battle of Italeni.
- The Voortrekker Andries Pretorius avenges Retief at the Battle of Blood River, devastatingly defeating the Zulus.
- The Voortrekker Hendrik Potgieter founds Potchefstroom.
- First National Bank opens as the Eastern triocrees Province Bank in Grahamstown.

=== 1839 ===
- The Voortrekkers found the Natalia Republic and Pietermaritzburg.

=== 1840 ===
- The Voortrekkers support a successful coup by Mpande, the half-brother of the Zulu king Dingane. Dingane flees and is killed. Andries Pretorius crowns Mpande as Zulu king.

=== 1841 ===
- The explorer David Livingstone arrives in Cape Town.

=== 1842 ===
- The United Kingdom conquers the Natalia Republic. Many Voortrekkers leave Natal.

=== 1843 ===
- The Port Elizabeth Cricket Club is founded, making it the oldest cricket club in South Africa.

=== 1844 ===
- The Republic of Natalia is renamed the British Natal Colony.
- The Voortrekker Hendrik Potgieter founds the Winburg-Potchefstroom Republic.

=== 1845 ===
- The Voortrekker Hendrik Potgieter founds Ohrigstad.
- Old Mutual is founded as a mutual insurance company by John Fairbairn, together with others including Saul Solomon.
- The Arderne Gardens is established.

=== 1846 ===
- Founding of Bloemfontein.
- The Seventh of the Xhosa Wars breaks out.

=== 1848 ===
- The Transorangia is renamed the British Orange River Sovereignty. The Winburg-Potchefstroom Republic ceases to exist.
- Governor Harry Smith, 1st Baronet defeats Andries Pretorius at the Battle of Boomplaats. Pretorius flees to the Transvaal with his followers.

=== 1849 ===
- The first Volksraad of Transvaal unites.
- Founding of Lydenburg.
- Anti-convict demonstrations take place to prevent the Cape Colony becoming a penal colony.

=== 1850 ===
- The Eight of the Xhosa Wars breaks out.
- Founding of Rustenburg.
- The first railway line opens in Durban.

== The Boer Republics ==
=== 1852 ===
- The United Kingdom recognises the independence of the Zuid-Afrikaansche Republiek (ZAR) at the Zandrivier Convention.
- The Griekwa captain Andries Waterboer dies and is succeeded by his son Nicolaas Waterboer.
- The Voortrekker Hendrik Potgieter dies and is succeeded by his son Piet Potgieter.

=== 1853 ===
- The Voortrekker Andries Pretorius dies and is succeeded by his son Marthinus Wessel Pretorius.
- The Parliament of the Cape of Good Hope is opened at Tuynhuys.

=== 1854 ===
- The United Kingdom recognises the independence of the Orange Free State at the Orange River Convention.
- After the murder of dozens of Boers, the ZAR launches a punitive expedition against the Southern Ndebele king Makapan. Piet Potgieter and over 2000 Southern Ndebele are killed in the Siege of Makapans Cave.

=== 1855 ===
- Founding of Pretoria, named after Andries Pretorius.

=== 1856 ===
- An apocalyptic prophecy by the Xhosa girl Nongqawuse leads to the starvation of some 40 000 Xhosa.
- The first constitution of the ZAR is approved by the Volksraad, but not accepted by all inhabitants.
- The Republic of Lydenburg splits from the ZAR.

=== 1857 ===
- Marthinus Wessel Pretorius is elected as the first State President of the ZAR.
- The Republic of Zoutpansberg splits from the ZAR.
- The Cape Argus daily newspaper is founded.

=== 1858 ===
- The final constitution of the ZAR is approved by the Volksraad.
- The Republic of Zoutpansberg rejoins with the ZAR.
- The First Basotho War breaks out between the Orange Free State and the Basotho.

=== 1859 ===
- Establishment of the Reformed Church in South Africa.

=== 1860 ===
- Pretoria replaces Potchefstroom as the capital of the ZAR.
- The Republic of Lydenburg rejoins with the ZAR.
- La Rochelle Girls' High School, together with Rhenish Girls' High School, open as the oldest girls' schools in South Africa.
- Indian indentured labourers are transported on the ship Truro from Madras to Durban.

=== 1861 ===
- The Griqua leave the Orange Free State under the leadership of Captain Adam Kok III.

=== 1862 ===
- The Griqua captain Adam Kok III founds Griqualand East.

=== 1864 ===
- End of the Transvaal Civil War.
- Johannes Henricus Brand is elected State President of the Orange Free State.

=== 1865 ===
- The Second Basotho War breaks out.

=== 1866 ===
- British Kaffraria is annexed by the Cape Colony.
- Founding of East London.
- The Eureka Diamond is found in Griqualand West.
- Stellenbosch University has its origins in the opening of the Stellenbosch Gymnasium.

=== 1867 ===
- The Third Basotho War breaks out.
- Schoemansdal is burnt down by the Venda.
- Mining starts with the discovery of a diamond on the banks of the Orange River.

=== 1868 ===
- Lesotho is renamed British Basutoland.
- The Basters, led by Captain Hermanus van Wyk, leave for Rehoboth in south-west Africa.
- Paarl Boys' High School opens.

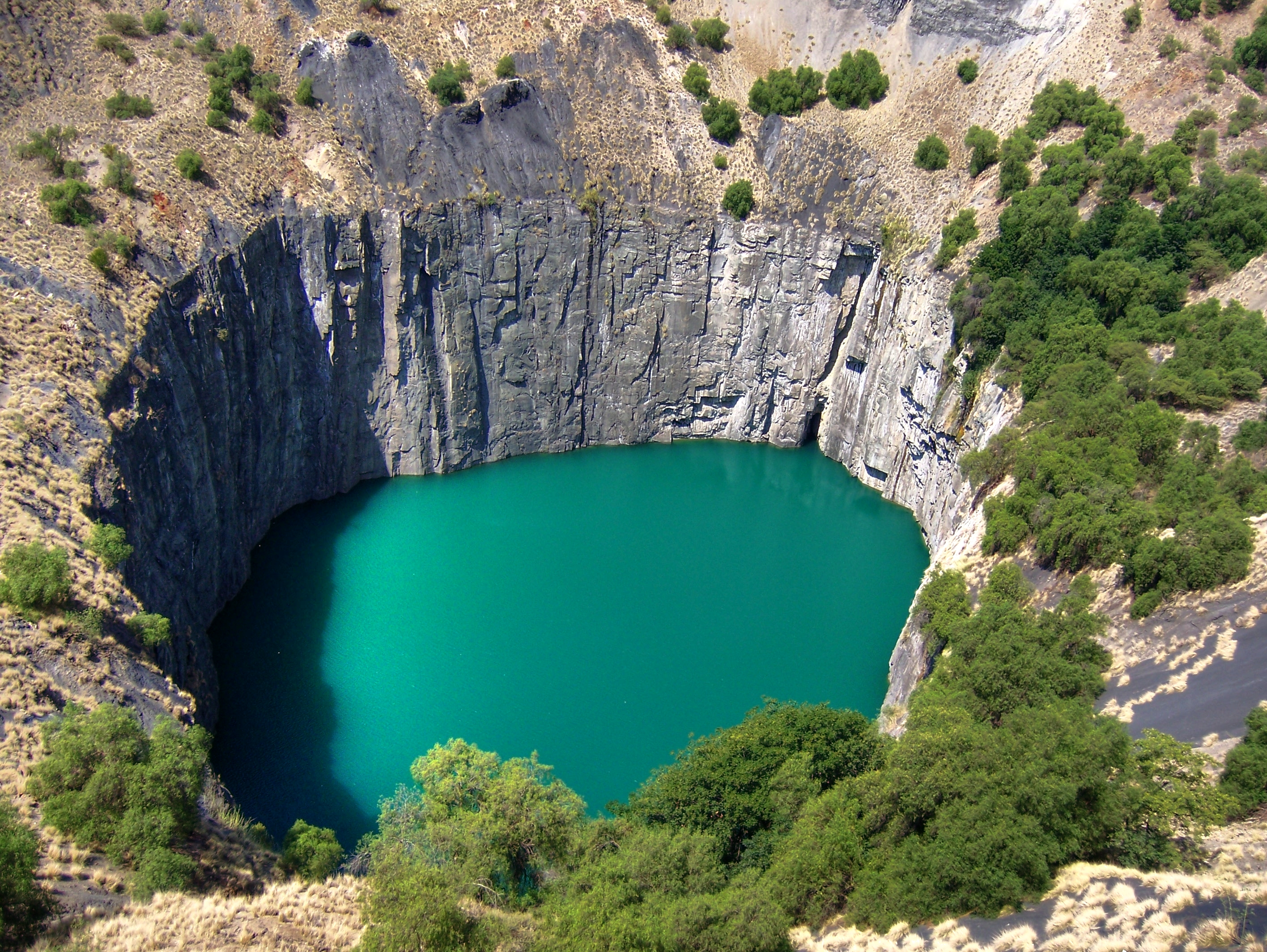
The Big Hole of Kimberley

=== 1870 ===
- Griqualand West is annexed by the United Kingdom. The founding of New Rush, later Kimberley. The diamond fields are claimed by the Griqua, the Orange Free State, the ZAR and the Cape Colony.
- Start of the first major diamond rush, and formation of the short-lived Diggers' Republic in Barkly West.

=== 1871 ===
- The diamond fields are assigned to the Griqua by Governor Robert William Keate of the Colony of Natal. As a result, Marthinus Wessel Pretorius resigns as State President of the ZAR. Cecil Rhodes leaves for Kimberley.

=== 1872 ===
- Thomas François Burgers is elected State President of the ZAR.
- John Molteno is appointed the first Prime Minister of the Cape Colony.
- The Zulu king Mpande dies and is succeeded by his son Cetshwayo.

=== 1873 ===
- The University of South Africa is founded as the University of the Cape of Good Hope.
- Pilgrim's Rest becomes the second of the Transvaal gold fields and attracts a rush of prospectors.

=== 1874 ===
- Start of the Dorsland Trek through the Kalahari Desert.
- KwaZulu-Natal National Botanical Garden is established.

=== 1875 ===
- The Houses of Parliament are built in Cape Town.
- Establishment of the Genootskap van Regte Afrikaners; a society to promote the Afrikaans language.

=== 1876 ===
- Sekhukhune defeats the Transvaal army. The ZAR is in disarray.
- The first tunnel of the Hex River Tunnels reaches Worcester.

=== 1877 ===
- Sir Theophilus Shepstone proclaims the ZAR as the British Transvaal Colony.
- Paul Kruger's first peaceful attempt to restore ZAR independence fails.
- The Ninth of the Xhosa Wars breaks out.
- Molteno Dam begins construction to supply Cape Town with water.

=== 1878 ===
- Walvis Bay and the Penguin Islands are annexed by the Cape Colony.
- Paul Kruger's second peaceful attempt to restore ZAR independence fails.
- The last of the quagga in the Orange Free State become extinct in the wild.

=== 1879 ===
- The Anglo-Zulu War breaks out between the United Kingdom and the Zulus. The war is won by the United Kingdom, although they suffer a crushing defeat at the Battle of Isandlwana. The United Kingdom conquers Zululand, and the area is absorbed into the Colony of Natal.
- Griqualand East is fully annexed into the Cape Colony.
- Founding of the Afrikanerbond.

=== 1880 ===
- Cecil Rhodes founds De Beers Mining Company.
- Griqualand West is annexed by the Cape Colony.
- The Boers of the Transvaal revolt at Paardekraal. A triumvirate consisting of Paul Kruger, Marthinus Wessel Pretorius and Piet Joubert restore the ZAR at Heidelberg .
- The First Boer War breaks out between the ZAR and the United Kingdom.

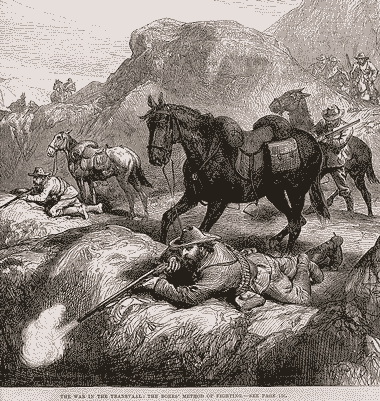
The Battle of Majuba Hill.

=== 1881 ===
- The ZAR defeats the United Kingdom at the Battle of Majuba Hill. The Pretoria Convention ends the First Boer War in favour of the ZAR.
- South Africa's first stock exchange, the Kimberley Royal Stock Exchange opens on 2 February.

=== 1882 ===
- Founding of the Republic of Stellaland and State of Goshen.
- Kimberly becomes the first city in the Southern Hemisphere and the second in the world to integrate electric street lights into its infrastructure.
- Dutch is recognised as an official language of the Cape Colony.

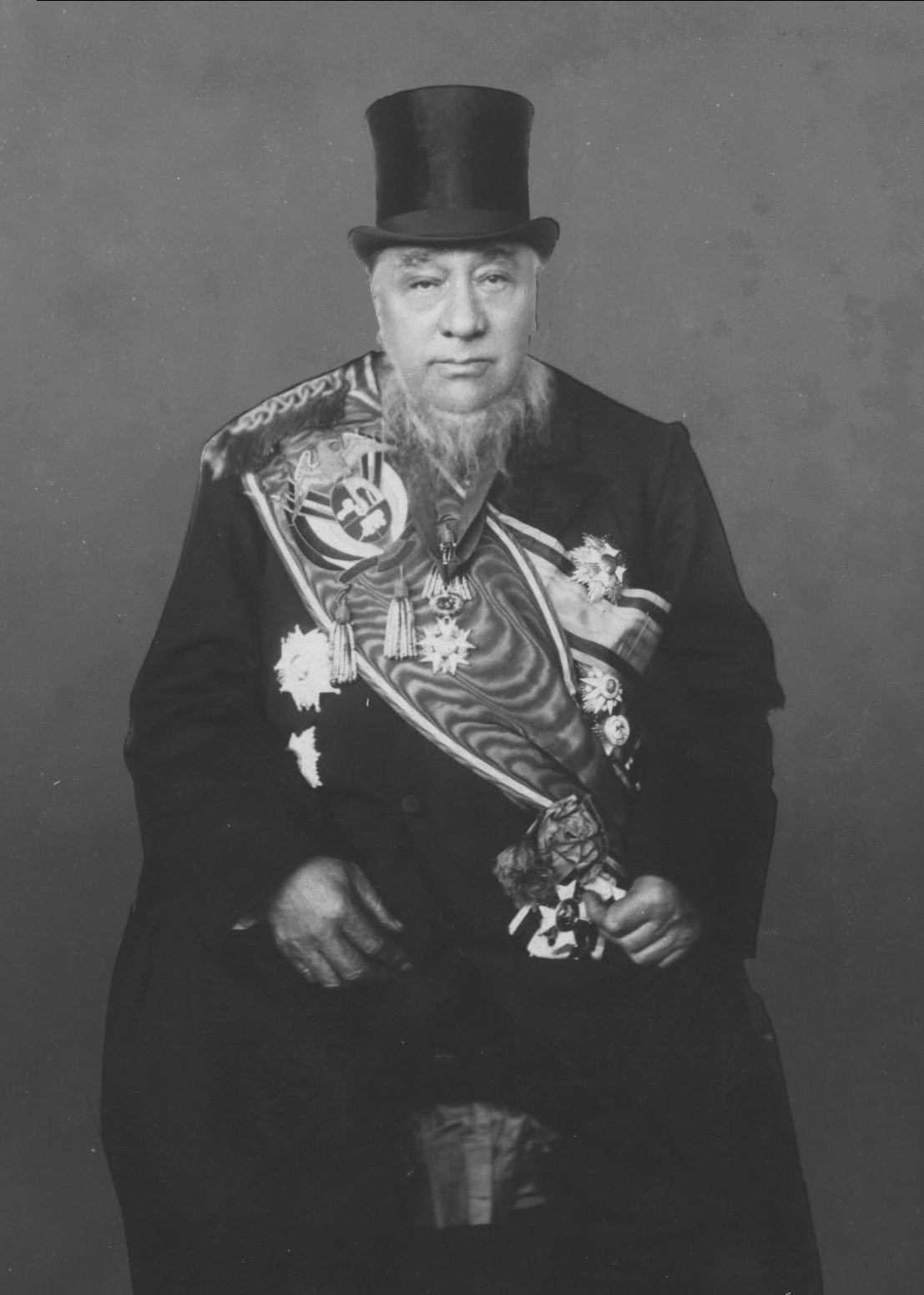
State President Paul Kruger.

=== 1883 ===
- Paul Kruger is elected State President of the ZAR.
- Unification of the Republic of Stellaland and the neighbouring State of Goshen to form the United States of Stellaland.

=== 1884 ===
- The London Convention revises the Pretoria Convention.
- Founding of the Nieuwe Republiek.

=== 1885 ===
- Bechuanaland is annexed by the British Empire. Stellaland and Goshen are annexed and added to Bechuanaland.

=== 1886 ===
- Gold is discovered at Witwatersrand.
- Founding of Johannesburg, which is overrun by foreign miners (uitlanders).
- Founding of Klein Vrystaat.

=== 1887 ===
- Zululand is annexed by the Natal Colony.
- Establishment of the Nederlandsch-Zuid-Afrikaansche Spoorwegmaatschappij (NZASM) railway company in the ZAR.
- The Johannesburg Stock Exchange is established with 68 companies.

=== 1888 ===
- Paul Kruger is elected state president of the ZAR for the second time.
- Francis William Reitz is elected State President of the Orange Free State.
- Nieuwe Republiek is annexed by the ZAR.
- Nedbank is founded as the Nederlandsche Bank en Credietvereeniging voor Zuid-Afrika ("Dutch Bank and Credit Union for South Africa")

=== 1889 ===
- South Africa becomes the third test-playing nation when it plays against England at Port Elizabeth.

=== 1890 ===
- Cecil Rhodes is appointed Prime Minister of the Cape Colony.

=== 1891 ===
- Klein Vrystaat is annexed by the ZAR.

=== 1892 ===
- The Franchise and Ballot Act is passed by Cecil Rhodes to disenfranchise black Africans; it triples the wealth requirement to vote. A precursor act to Apartheid that followed.

=== 1893 ===
- Paul Kruger is elected for the third time as state president of the ZAR.
- Gandhi arrives in Durban.
- The Excelsior Diamond is discovered at the Jagersfontein Mine. It is the largest in the world until the 1905 discovery of the Cullinan Diamond.

=== 1894 ===
- Swaziland is annexed by the ZAR.
- The Glen Grey Act is passed, thus beginning the segregation of races.

=== 1895 ===
- Marthinus Theunis Steyn is elected state president of the Orange Free State.
- The railway line from Pretoria to Lourenço Marques (Maputo) is officially opened and operated by the NZASM.
- The Jameson Raid begins. Leander Starr Jameson, commanded by Cecil Rhodes, invades the ZAR.
- The Graaff Electric Lighting Works at the site of the Molteno Dam, becomes the first hydro-electric plant in South Africa, the first power plant in Cape Town, and the second electric power plant in South Africa.
- Groenkloof Nature Reserve is the first game sanctuary in Africa.
- The Jubilee Diamond is discovered.

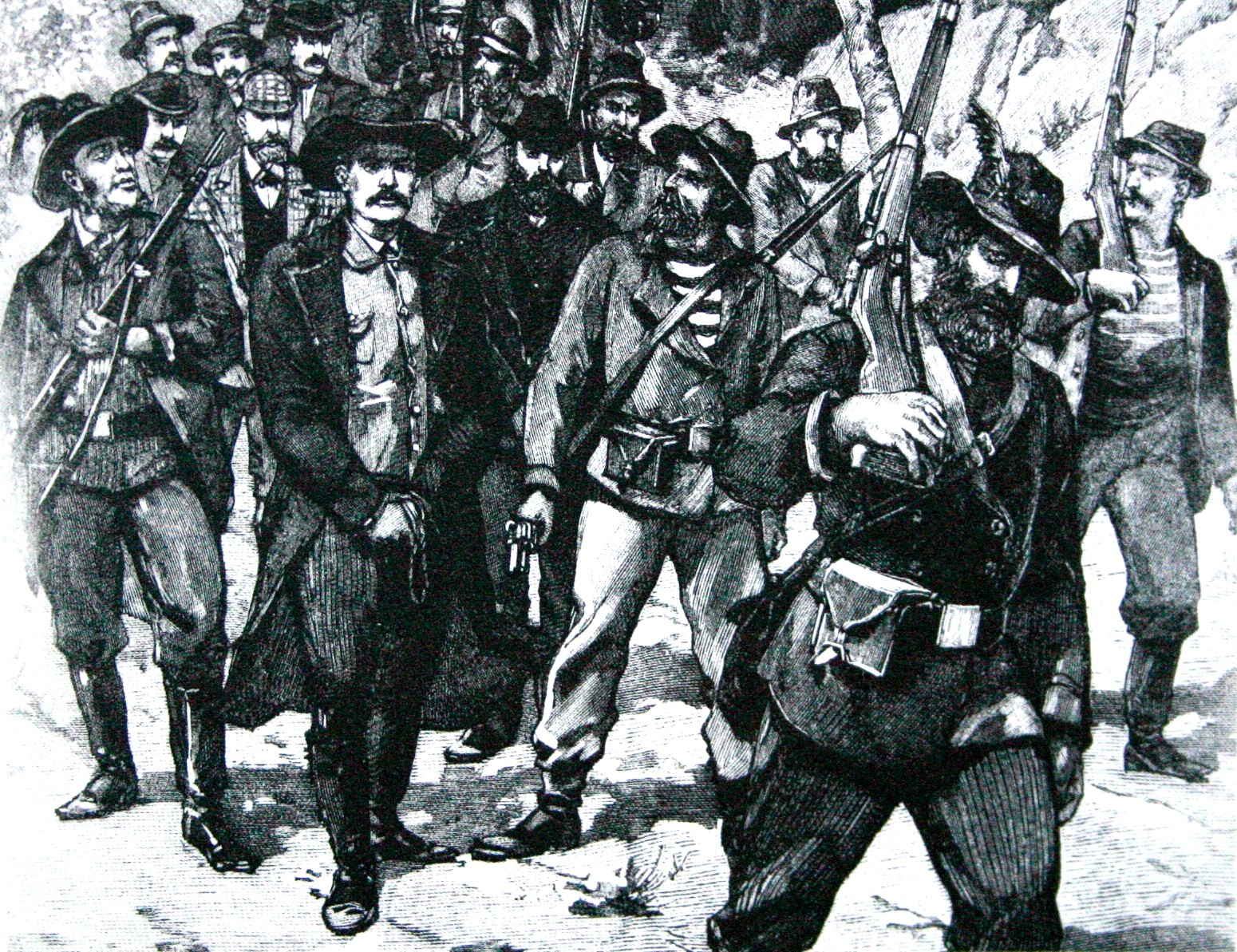
Arrest of Leander Starr Jameson

=== 1896 ===
- The Jameson Raid is crushed and Jameson is imprisoned. A telegram congratulating State President Paul Kruger from Kaiser Wilhelm II of Germany causes a scandal. Cecil Rhodes steps down as Prime Minister.
- The South African School of Mines is established, which would later become the University of the Witwatersrand and the University of Pretoria.

=== 1898 ===
- Paul Kruger is elected state president of the ZAR for the fourth time.
- Paul Kruger lays the foundations for the Sabie Game Reserve, which later became Kruger National Park.

=== 1899 ===
- Negotiations at the Bloemfontein Conference between State President Paul Kruger and Cape Colony Governor Alfred Milner fail. The Second Boer War breaks out between the ZAR, the Orange Free State and the United Kingdom.

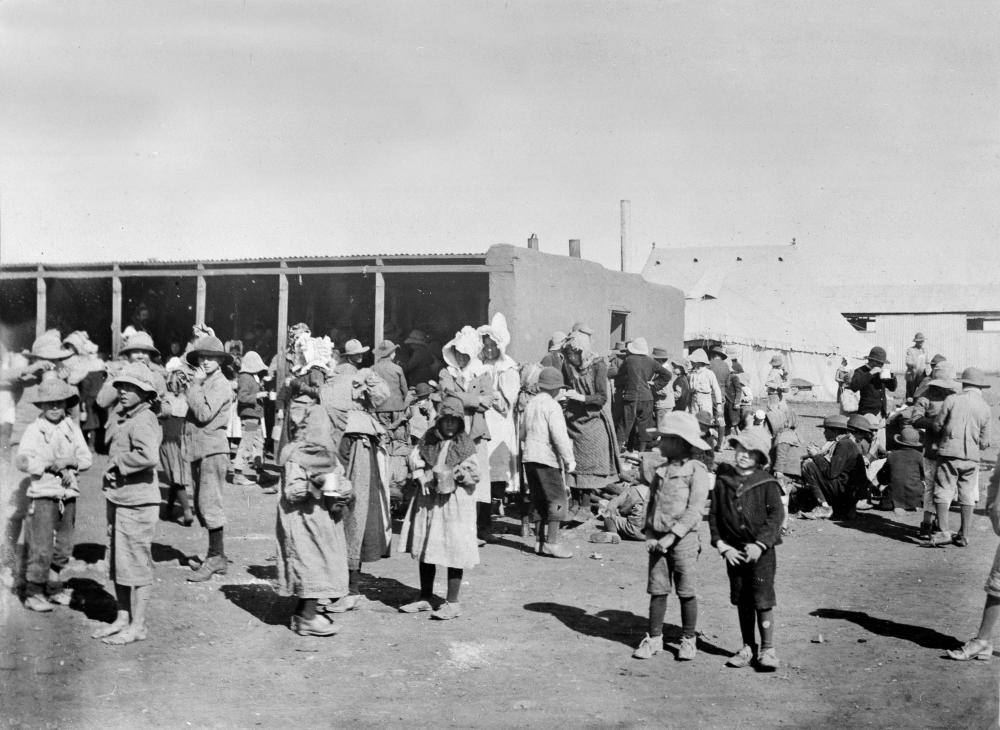
Second Boer War concentration camp

=== 1900 ===
- The Orange Free State and the ZAR are conquered by the United Kingdom, but the Bittereinders refuse to give up the fight. The United Kingdom uses the scorched earth tactic of burning down farms and imprisoning Boer women and children in concentration camps. State President Paul Kruger leaves for Europe.

=== 1901 ===
- Emily Hobhouse sounds the alarm about the concentration camps of the Boer War.

=== 1902 ===
- The Treaty of Vereeniging ends the Second Boer War. The ZAR and the Orange Free State are annexed by the United Kingdom. The ZAR is renamed the British Transvaal Colony and the Orange Free State the British Orange River Colony.

=== 1903 ===
- The Union Observatory opens in Johannesburg. It's known for the discovery of Proxima Centauri by Robert Innes in 1915, and 6,000 double stars.

=== 1905 ===
- The Cullinan Diamond is discovered, the largest gem-quality rough diamond ever found.

=== 1904 ===
- 63 000 Chinese miners arrive in the Transvaal Colony.

=== 1906 ===
- Start of the first 24-hour weather forecasts in South Africa by Harry Edwin Wood.

=== 1907 ===
- The Transvaal Colony and the Orange River Colony are given self-governance. Abraham Fischer becomes the first (and only) Prime Minister of the Orange River Colony.

=== 1908 ===
- Reggie Walker becomes South Africa's first-ever Olympic medallist at the 1908 Summer Olympics, and the youngest ever male champion in the Olympics 100-metre.

== Union of South Africa ==
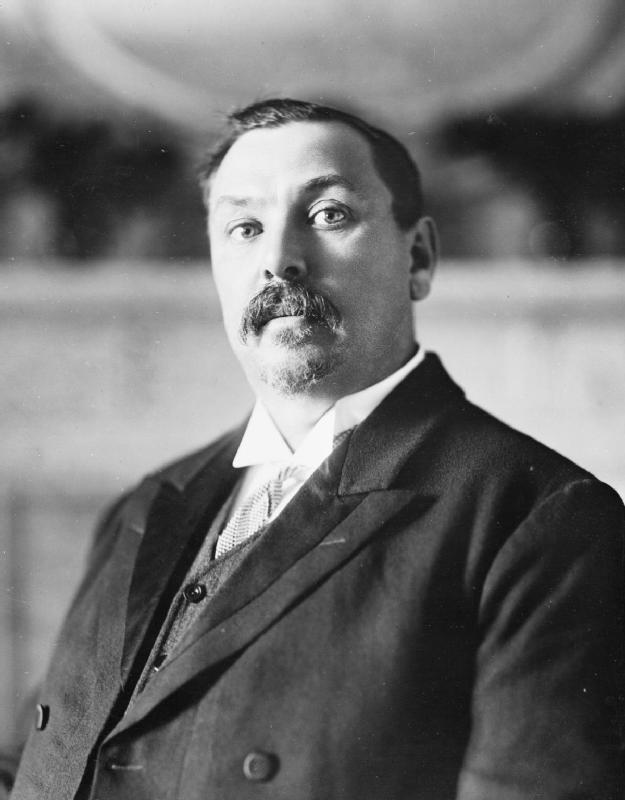
First Prime Minister of South Africa, Louis Botha.

=== 1910 ===
- The Cape Colony, Natal Colony, Transvaal Colony and Orange River Colony are together renamed the four provinces of the Union of South Africa and granted Dominion status. Louis Botha becomes the first Prime Minister of South Africa.
- Founding of the South African Party.
- Construction of the Union Buildings begins.

=== 1912 ===
- Founding of the African National Congress (ANC).
- The Union Defence Force is established.
- Establishment of the Union Observatory.

=== 1913 ===
- Founding of the National Party.
- The Natives Land Act is enacted, regulating the acquisition of land by black South Africans. It defined less than one-tenth of South Africa as Black "reserves" from which they were allowed purchase or lease of land. Land outside of this was prohibited.
- The first significant miners' strike occurs.

=== 1914 ===
- World War I breaks out and South Africa declares war on Germany. A revolt by Boer veterans is put down by the South African Army.

=== 1915 ===
- South Africa captures German South West Africa from Germany.
- Proxima Centauri (the closest star to the Sun) is discovered at the Union Observatory by Robert Innes.

=== 1916 ===
- The Native Trust and Land Act is passed.

=== 1918 ===
- Establishment of the Afrikaner Broederbond which is credited with the conception of Apartheid.

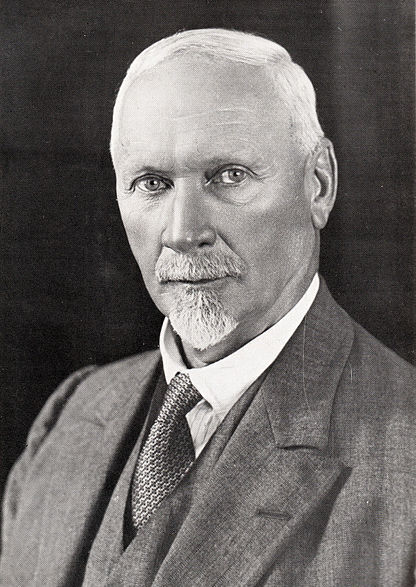
Second Prime Minister Jan Smuts.

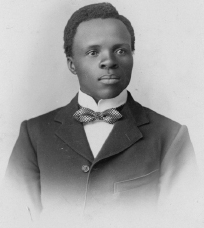
Photograph of Sol Plaatje from his 1915 book Native Life in South Africa

=== 1919 ===
- South West Africa becomes a South African administered mandate.
- Prime Minister Louis Botha dies and is succeeded by Jan Smuts as the second Prime Minister of South Africa.
- Sol Plaatje becomes the first black South African to write a novel in English – Mhudi.

=== 1921 ===
- Founding of the South African Communist Party.
- The South African Reserve Bank is established.

=== 1922 ===
- The Rand Rebellion by white miners in Witwatersrand is crushed by the South African Army, killing 153.
- The University of the Witwatersrand is granted full university status.
- Rhodesian colonists reject admitting Rhodesia as a fifth province of the Union.

=== 1923 ===
- Introduction of the Natives (Urban Areas) Act, meant to segregate the population.
- Eskom is founded.
- Hartbeespoort Dam is opened.
- Radio broadcasting begins.

=== 1924 ===
- J. B. M. Hertzog is elected third Prime Minister of South Africa.

=== 1925 ===
- Afrikaans is recognised by the South African government as a distinct language and equates it as a variety of Dutch.

=== 1926 ===
- Kruger National Park is established as South Africa's first national park.

The flag of South Africa from 1928 to 1994.

=== 1928 ===
- The new flag of South Africa based on the Prinsenvlag is introduced.

=== 1930 ===
- White women are allowed the right to vote in the Women's Enfranchisement Act.
- The Transvaal University College changes its name to the University of Pretoria and is established separately.

=== 1934 ===
- The Status of the Union Act, 1934 is passed. It declares the Union of South Africa to be a "sovereign independent state" and explicitly adopts the Statute of Westminster into South African law.
- The South African Party and National Party merge to form the United Party.

=== 1938 ===
- The Coelacanth is discovered by Marjorie Courtenay-Latimer living off the coast of South Africa at the Chalumna River.

=== 1939 ===
- World War II breaks out. Against the wishes of Prime Minister J. B. M. Hertzog, South Africa declares war on Germany. Hertzog resigns and Jan Smuts is re-elected Prime Minister of South Africa.

=== 1941 ===
- South African troops fight against Nazi Germany in Ethiopia.

=== 1942 ===
- The Imperial Military Hospital, Baragwanath is opened during WWII. Later becoming the Chris Hani Baragwanath Hospital; the largest hospital in Africa and one of the largest hospitals in the world.

=== 1945 ===
- The Council for Scientific and Industrial Research is established.

== Apartheid ==
=== 1946 ===
- The Native Laws Commission (Fagan Commission) recommends relaxation of restrictions on black South Africans living and working in urban areas.

=== 1948 ===
- The Sauer Commission (a response to the Fagan Commission) recommends segregation should continue and be implemented across all social and economic areas of life.
- South Africa annexes the Prince Edward Islands.
- D. F. Malan is elected Prime Minister of South Africa.
- Start of Apartheid after the 1948 South African general election.
- The Atomic Energy Board is established.

=== 1949 ===
- The Voortrekker Monument is unveiled in Pretoria.
- The Prohibition of Mixed Marriages Act is passed.

=== 1950 ===
- The first of the Group Areas Act laws passes, codifying racial segregation.

=== 1952 ===
- Van Riebeeck's Day celebrates the 300th anniversary of the Dutch presence in South Africa.
- Jan Smuts International Airport (now known as O. R. Tambo International Airport) is opened to become Africa's second busiest airport.
- Defiance Campaign against Unjust Laws is the first "large-scale, multi-racial political mobilisation against apartheid laws under a common leadership."

=== 1954 ===
- The Tomlinson Commission reports on the economic viability of the native reserves (later formed into the bantustans).

=== 1955 ===
- The Freedom Charter is adopted by the Congress Alliance.

=== 1956 ===
- The Women's March is a protest against the introduction of Apartheid pass laws in 1952.
- The Treason Trial takes place.

=== 1957 ===
- Die Stem van Suid-Afrika is introduced as the national anthem of South Africa.
- The Protea is South Africa's first production car.

=== 1958 ===
- Hendrik Verwoerd is elected Prime Minister of South Africa.
- The Pan-African Congress splits from the ANC.

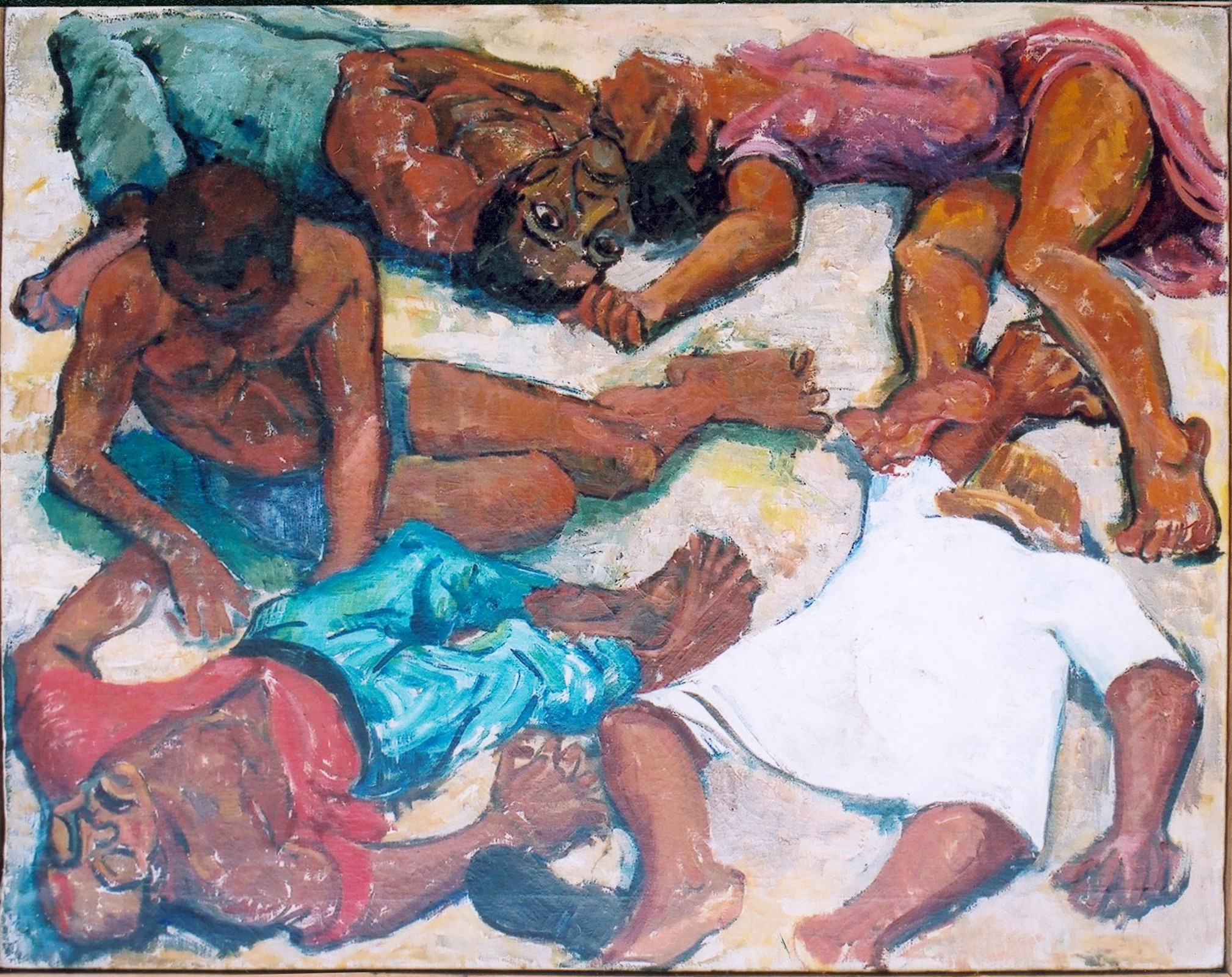
Painting of the Sharpeville massacre by Godfrey Rubens.

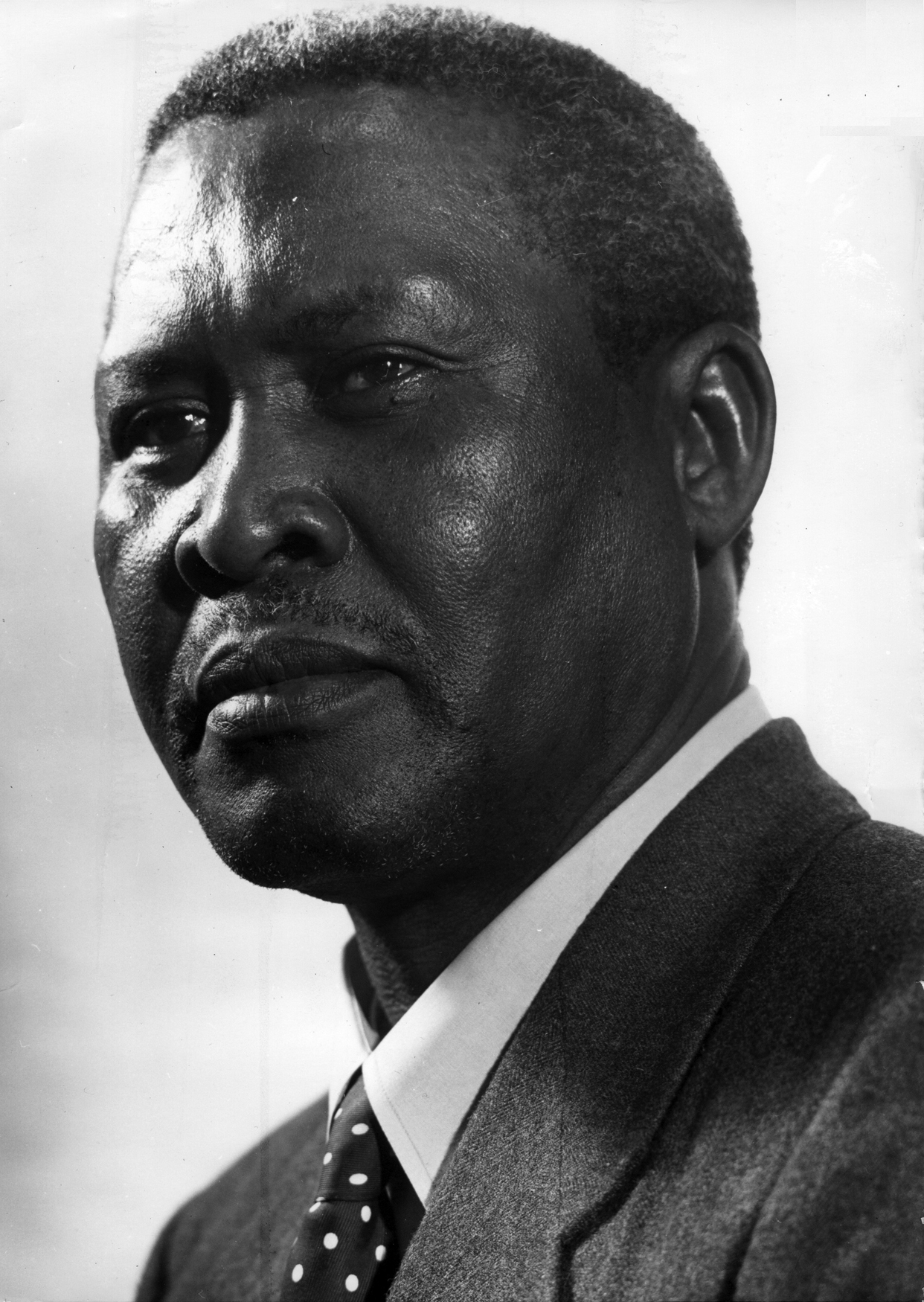
Albert Luthuli

=== 1960 ===
- Protests in Sharpeville leads to the killing of 69 people by the South African Police.
- Prime Minister Hendrik Verwoerd is injured in a failed assassination attempt.
- Human rights activist Albert Luthuli wins the Nobel Peace Prize.
- 437 miners are killed in the Coalbrook mining disaster.

=== 1961 ===
- The Union of South Africa leaves the British Commonwealth and becomes a republic.
- Introduction of the South African Rand as the currency.
- Creation of Umkhonto we Sizwe, the military wing of the ANC.
- FIFA suspends South Africa.

=== 1962 ===
- The United Nations passes Resolution 1761 calling for a boycott of South Africa. The country is no longer allowed to participate in the Olympic Games.

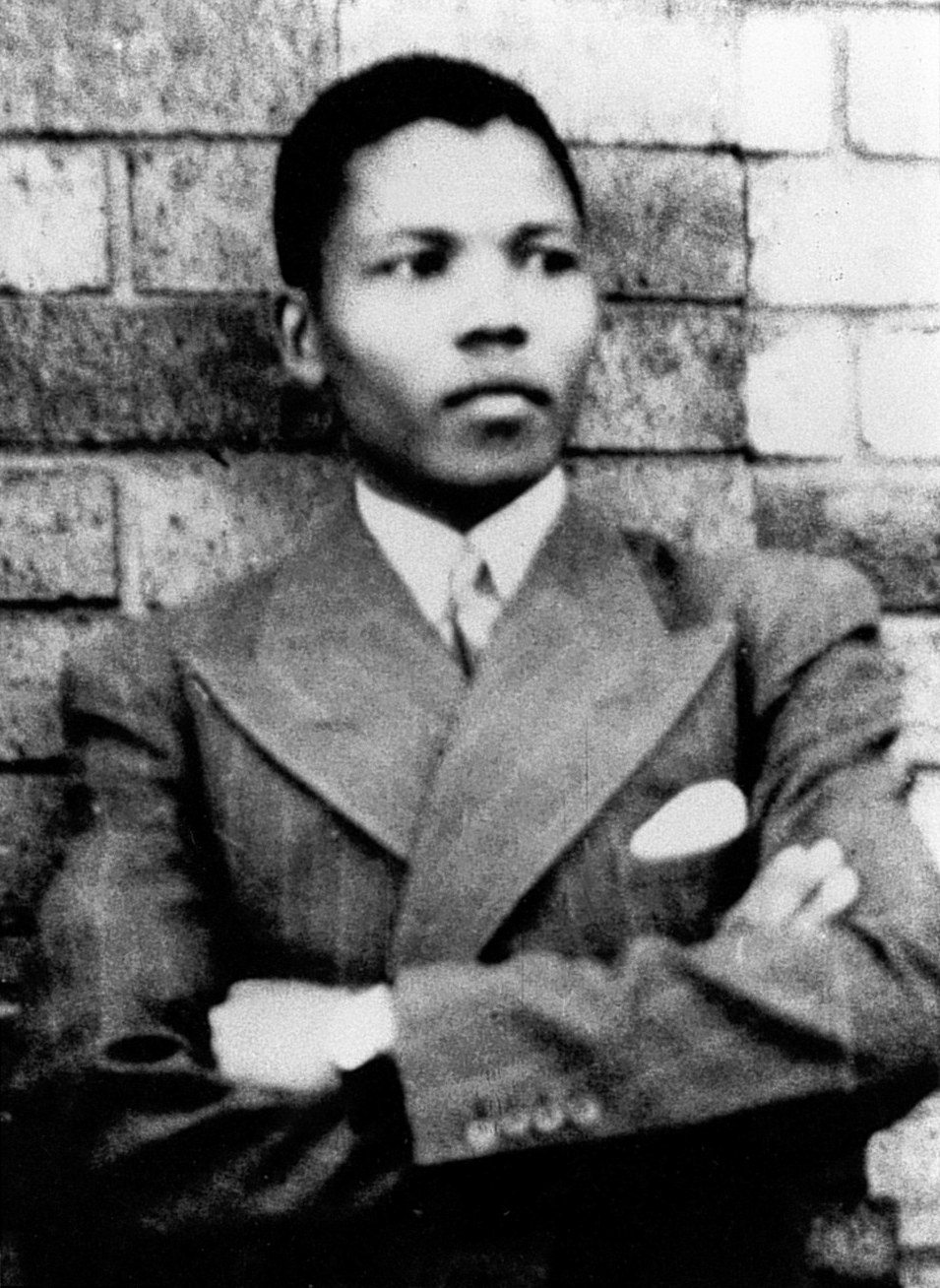
Human rights activist Nelson Mandela

=== 1964 ===
- Nelson Mandela makes his I Am Prepared to Die speech in the Rivonia Trial. He is sentenced to life imprisonment to serve on Robben Island.
- The Tsitsikamma Marine Protected Area is declared as South Africa's first Marine Protected Area

=== 1965 ===
- The nuclear research reactor SAFARI-1 comes online at Pelindaba. It is now used in the production of molybdenum-99.

=== 1966 ===
- Start of the South African Border War.
- Prime Minister Hendrik Verwoerd is assassinated by Dimitri Tsafendas.
- BJ Vorster is elected Prime Minister of South Africa

=== 1967 ===
- The first ever successful heart transplant is performed by cardiac surgeon Christiaan Barnard.

=== 1971 ===
- The Standard Encyclopaedia of Southern Africa is published.

=== 1973 ===
- The Carlton Centre opens as the tallest skyscraper in the Southern Hemisphere.

=== 1975 ===
- Creation of the Inkatha Freedom Party.
- South Africa invade Angola in Operation Savannah.

=== 1976 ===
- The Soweto uprising begins in response to the introduction of Afrikaans as the medium of instruction in black schools.
- New Zealand plays rugby matches against South Africa regardless of the international boycott. Because New Zealand is not suspended by the International Olympic Committee, 28 countries boycotted the 1976 Summer Olympics.
- South Africa's (and Africa's) first and only nuclear power station Koeberg Nuclear Power Station begins construction.
- Television in South Africa is introduced.

=== 1977 ===
- Human rights activist Steve Biko dies after being brutally beaten by the South African Police.
- Creation of the Progressive Federal Party.

=== 1979 ===
- South Africa runs its first nuclear weapons test.

=== 1981 ===
- Project Coast, a clandestine chemical and biological weapons programme, is instituted by the South African Defence Force.

=== 1982 ===
- Founding of the Conservative Party.
- South Africa builds its first operational nuclear weapon (code-named Hobo and later called Cabot) with a yield of 6 kilotons of TNT.

=== 1983 ===
- First diagnosis of AIDS in South Africa.
- Dutch is no longer one of South Africa’s official languages.
- The Bloukrans Bridge is opened as the highest concrete arch in Africa. It is the site of the world's highest commercial bridge bungee jumping, Bloukrans Bridge Bungy.

=== 1984 ===
- P. W. Botha is elected State President of South Africa.
- Archbishop Desmond Tutu wins the Nobel Peace Prize for his peaceful opposition to Apartheid.
- Reactor Unit 1 of the Koeberg Nuclear Power Station is synchronised to the grid.

=== 1985 ===
- State President P. W. Botha gives his Rubicon speech in which he refuses to change his position regarding the Apartheid system, including the release of Mandela.
- Reactor Unit 2 of the Koeberg Nuclear Power Station is synchronised to the grid.

=== 1986 ===
- P. W. Botha declares a state of emergency over South Africa after the United States introduces the Comprehensive Anti-Apartheid Act.
- The Lesotho Highlands Water Project is realised.

=== 1988 ===
- The first South African IP address is granted to Rhodes University.

=== 1989 ===
- State President P. W. Botha suffers a stroke and resigns. F. W. de Klerk is elected State President of South Africa.
- Founding of the Democratic Party.
- South Africa ends its nuclear weapons programme and dismantles six fully completed nuclear weapons.

=== 1990 ===
- Following negotiations to end apartheid in South Africa, State President F. W. de Klerk announces reforms in Apartheid policy. The ban on the African National Congress is lifted and Nelson Mandela is released.
- The mandate of South West Africa becomes independent as the Republic of Namibia.
- The .za namespace is introduced.
- First flight of the Denel Rooivalk attack helicopter.

=== 1991 ===
- Passing of the Abolition of Racially Based Land Measures Act which repealed many of the apartheid laws that imposed race-based restrictions on land ownership and land use.

=== 1992 ===
- The white people of South Africa approve of De Klerk's reforms in a referendum.
- 45 people are killed in the Boipatong Massacre, an attack committed by supporters of the Inkatha Freedom Party.
- 28 protestors demanding Ciskei be reincorporated into South Africa (and 1 soldier) are killed in the Bisho massacre.

=== 1993 ===
- Nelson Mandela and F. W. de Klerk receive the Nobel Peace Prize.
- Communist politician Chris Hani is murdered by a far-right extremist.
- The Interim Constitution is put into law.

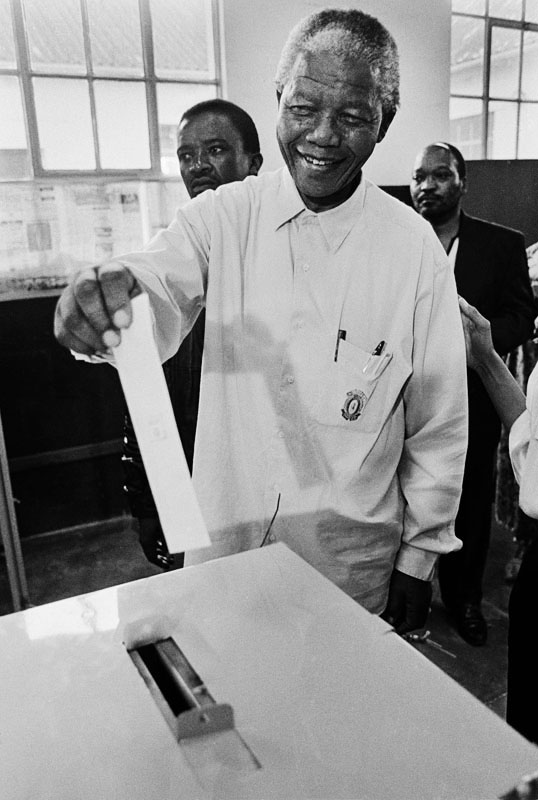
Mandela votes for the first time in his life, at the Ohlange School, Inanda, Durban.

Flag of South Africa

== The Rainbow Nation ==
=== 1994 ===
- South Africa's first general election takes place. Nelson Mandela is elected President of South Africa.
- The Bantustans are dissolved. President Lucas Mangope of the bantustan Bophuthatswana rebels and is supported by the Afrikaner Weerstandsbeweging, but is deposed by the South African Army.
- South Africa is divided into nine provinces.
- The new Flag of South Africa is introduced.
- Walvis Bay is handed over to Namibia.
- Founding of the Freedom Front Plus party.
- South Africa rejoins the Commonwealth as a republic.
- Freedom Day is first celebrated.

=== 1995 ===
- Establishment of the South African Truth and Reconciliation Commission. Desmond Tutu becomes chairman.
- South Africa host and win the 1995 Rugby World Cup.
- The Constitutional Court abolishes the death penalty.

=== 1996 ===
- The official languages of the Republic are described as Sepedi, Sesotho, Setswana, siSwati, Tshivenda, Xitsonga, Afrikaans, English, isiNdebele, isiXhosa and isiZulu.
- SANAE IV is built as an Antarctic research base.

=== 1997 ===
- The final Constitution of South Africa becomes effective.
- The new National anthem of South Africa is introduced.

=== 1998 ===
- Table Mountain National Park is established.
- The Proteas win the 1998 ICC KnockOut Trophy.

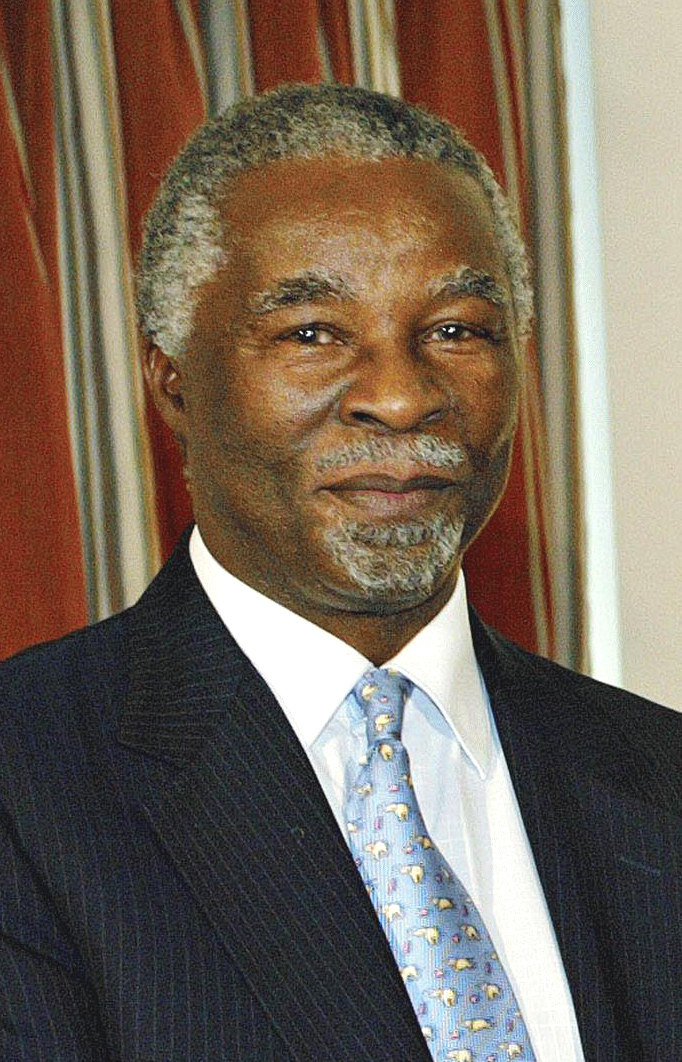
Second President Thabo Mbeki.

=== 1999 ===
- Thabo Mbeki is elected President of South Africa.
- iSimangaliso Wetland Park is listed as a World Heritage Site.
- SUNSAT becomes the first launched South African satellite.
- South Africa becomes a full G20 member.
- Calls for investigation into large-scale government corruption with the South African Arms Deal.

=== 2000 ===
- Adoption of the new Coat of arms of South Africa.
- Creation of the Democratic Alliance.
- The Maloti-Drakensberg Park is added as a UNESCO World Heritage Site.
- The Institute for Justice and Reconciliation, the successor to the Truth and Reconciliation Commission, is established.

=== 2002 ===
- Mark Shuttleworth becomes the first South African to travel to space as a space tourist; and the first African from an independent country to travel to space.

=== 2003 ===
- The South African National Antarctic Programme is formed.

=== 2004 ===
- Eskom announces that a Pebble bed modular reactor will be built at Koeberg (this is later abandoned).

=== 2005 ===
- The Vredefort impact structure (created by one the largest ever asteroids (20 to 25 kilometres in diameter) to strike the Earth, 2.023 billion years ago) is added to the list of UNESCO World Heritage Sites for its geologic interest.
- The Southern African Large Telescope (SALT) opens as the largest optical telescope in the Southern Hemisphere.

=== 2007 ===
- South Africa wins the 2007 Rugby World Cup in France.

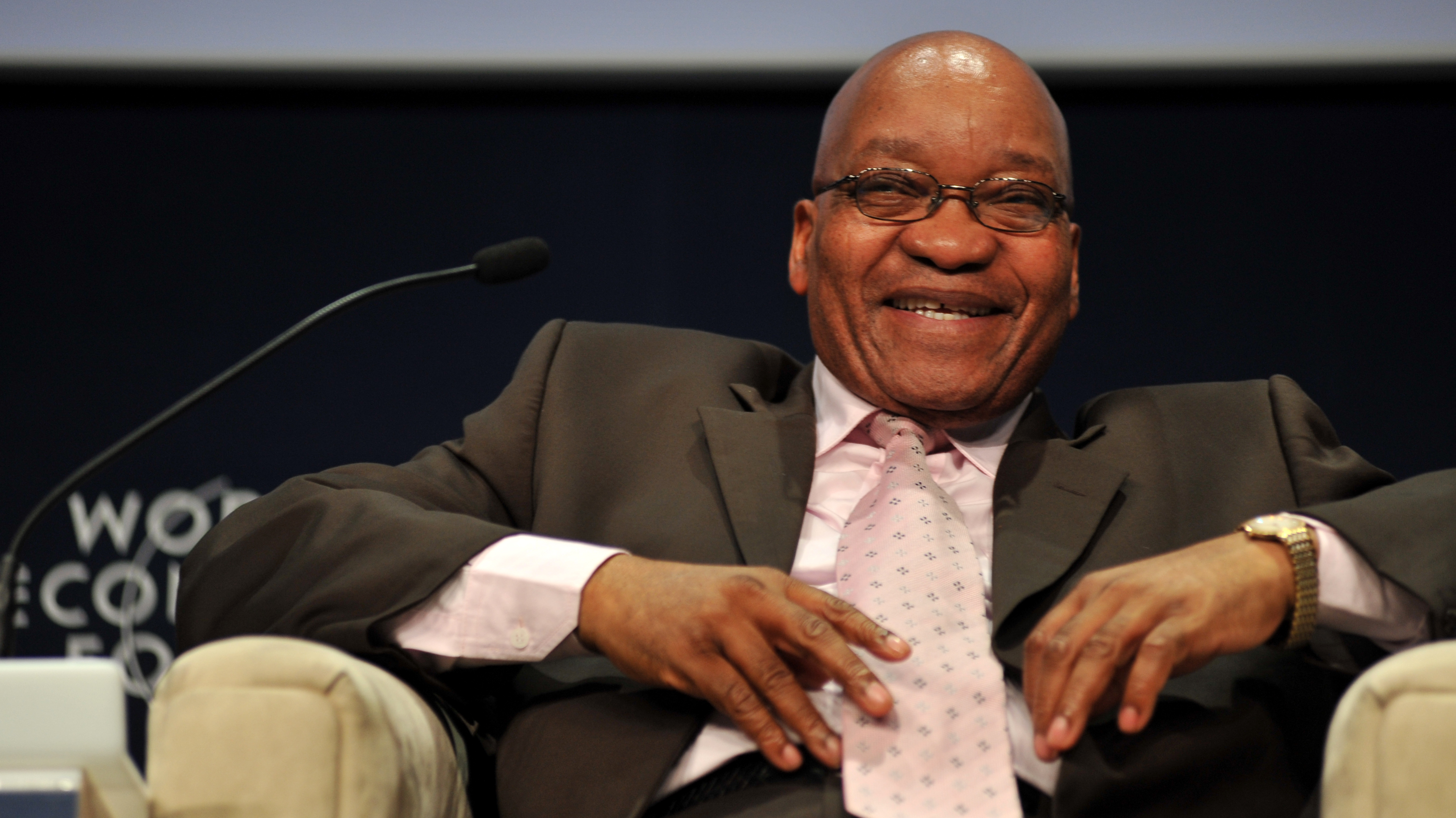
Third President Jacob Zuma.

=== 2008 ===
- President Thabo Mbeki loses the power struggle over the ANC to Jacob Zuma and resigns. His supporters establish the Congress of the People.
- Xenophobic attacks against immigrants kill 62 people.

=== 2009 ===
- Jacob Zuma is elected President of South Africa.
- The Spy Tapes Scandal implicates Jacob Zuma in corruption relating to the Arms Deal.
- Mandela Day is launched worldwide to celebrate the idea that each individual has the power to transform the world.

=== 2010 ===
- South Africa hosts the 2010 FIFA World Cup.
- South Africa joins BRICS as its fifth member.

=== 2012 ===
- Table Mountain is named as one of the New 7 Wonders of Nature.

=== 2013 ===
- Creation of the Economic Freedom Fighters.
- Nelson Mandela dies at the age of 95.

=== 2014 ===
- Cape Town becomes World Design Capital.

=== 2015 ===
- Demonstrations take place against the preservation of the statue of Cecil Rhodes at the University of Cape Town.

=== 2016 ===
- Wayde van Niekerk becomes the men's world record holder of the 400 metres at the Olympics with a time of 43.03 seconds.
- The Centre for High Performance Computing launches the Lengau supercomputer cluster.

=== 2017 ===
- The Garden Route is added to UNESCO's World Network of Biosphere Reserves.
- The Zeitz Museum of Contemporary Art Africa is opened as the largest museum of contemporary art from Africa.

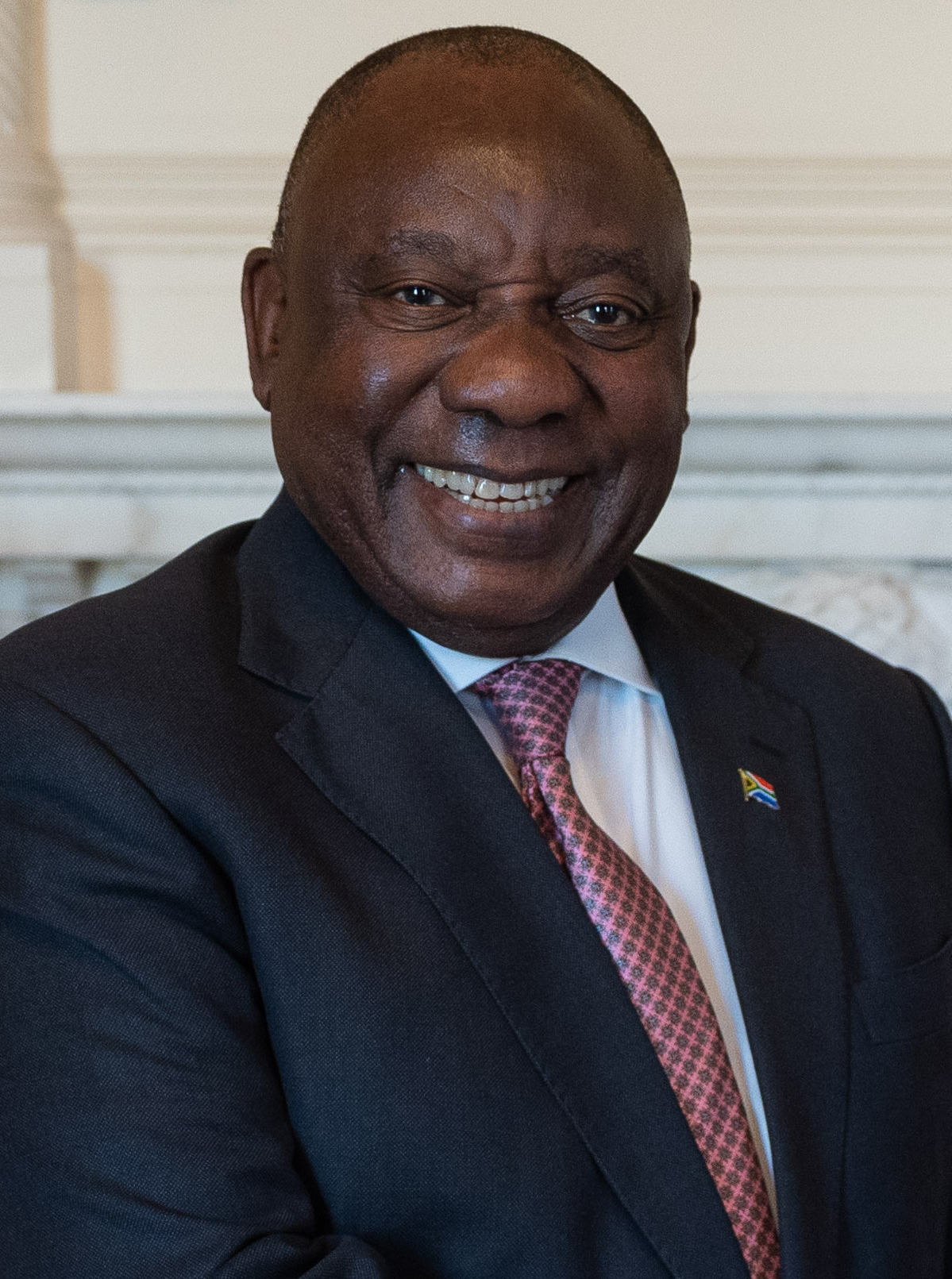
President Cyril Ramaphosa

=== 2018 ===
- President Zuma, accused of corruption, resigns under pressure from the ANC. The party elects Cyril Ramaphosa as his successor.
- The Judicial Commission of Inquiry into Allegations of State Capture, Corruption and Fraud in the Public Sector including Organs of State (Zondo Commission) is underway.

=== 2019 ===
- South Africa wins the 2019 Rugby World Cup in Japan.

=== 2020 ===
- The COVID-19 pandemic spreads to South Africa, with the first confirmed case announced on 5 March.
- The Meerkat National Park is proclaimed. It will house the Square Kilometre Array, MeerKAT and HERA telescopes.

=== 2021 ===
- Former president Jacob Zuma is imprisoned in contempt of court.
- The Zuma riots, a wave of civil unrest occurs in KwaZulu-Natal and Gauteng, killing 354 people.

=== 2022 ===
- The final of the three-part report of the Judicial Commission of Inquiry into State Capture is published.
- Severe floods across KwaZulu-Natal leave at least 435 people dead.
- Banyana Banyana win the Women's Africa Cup of Nations.

=== 2023 ===
- South Africa experiences a cholera outbreak.
- The 15th BRICS summit is held in South Africa, expanding its membership.
- The Public Protector Busisiwe Mkhwebane is impeached.
- South Africa wins the 2023 Rugby World Cup in France.
- South African Sign Language becomes the twelfth official language.

=== 2024 ===
- South Africa presents its case at the International Court of Justice, accusing Israel of genocidal conduct in the Gaza Strip.
- The National Health Insurance Act is signed into law.
- The 2024 South African general election takes place and Cyril Ramaphosa is re-elected as president of a landmark national unity government.

=== 2025 ===
- The first G20 summit on the African continent is held in Johannesburg as South Africa assumes the presidency.
- The Proteas win the ICC World Test Championship.
