= ZA Central Registry =

Non-profit that operates various second-level domains in South Africa

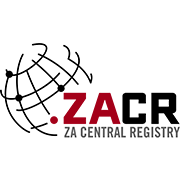
- Type: non-profit organisation
- Industry: ICT
- Founded: 1988
- Headquarters: Midrand, South Africa
- Website: registry.net.za

The ZA Central Registry (ZACR), formerly known as UniForum SA, is a non-profit organisation established in 1988 and operates various second-level domains (SLD's) in South Africa. The ZA Central Registry is the administrator of the South African zones such as "co.za" and "web.za". Their offices are based in Midrand, South Africa.

The ZACR, in partnership with the Africa Union Commission (AUC), is the applicant for the dotAfrica domain in ICANN's new Top-level domain program. The ZACR has also partnered with the ZA Domain Name Authority (ZADNA), the South African Domain Name regulator, to implement the .joburg, .capetown, and .durban Top-level domains (TLDs).

== History ==
The ZA Central Registry was established as a non-profit company in 1988 under the name of UniForum S.A. The organisation's goal was the promotion of open standards systems and related hardware, software applications and standards. Internet Service Provider Association (ISPA) assigned to Uniforum the responsibility of administering the "co.za" domain name space. This was because it was seen as not only having the technical skills and resources to do so, but also committed to neutrality and unity of purpose. The registry started with 400 registered domains. In 2017, the ZA Central Registry had over 920,000 co.za domain name registrations, which was over 95% of the total registrations in the ".za" ccTLD. This made the registry the largest domain name registry on the African continent.

== Projects ==
The registry signed four registry operator contracts with ICANN at its Singapore meeting in April 2014, which officially appoints the ZACR as the accredited ICANN registry to manage the administration function for ".joburg", ".capetown", ".durban" and ".africa".

Web.za is a generic top level domain which is now being administered by ZACR. This means that accredited registrars are now able to register names in Web.Za. This .za 2nd level domain was re-launched by ZADNA, under ZA Central Registry's operation. Web.Za takes domain name registrations on the same basis as co.za: no eligibility requirements, open to domain name applications by South Africans and non-South Africans. The re-launch allows for protection of trademarks, starting with a limited sunrise and land rush processes.

.Africa(dotAfrica) is the new generic Top Level Domain (gTLD) for the African continent. The application was submitted with the endorsement and support of the African Union Commission (AUC), individual African governments, regional governmental agencies and organisations. The .Africa domain name was launched in 2017.

.Cities- ZACR in partnership with ZADNA and the support of the South African Department of Communications, submitted applications for the ".durban", ".capetown" and ".joburg" TLDs. This will enable key South African cities to compete with their international counterparts and allow them to showcase the cities as business and tourist destinations.

== Achievements ==
- 1995– In September, the registry started its co.za administration with only 400 entries.
- 2001– Translating the co.za registry web site into all 11 official languages of South Africa.
- 2005– Establishing a center of excellence to promote and enhance DNS skills base in South Africa and the African continent at large.
- 2011-Transitioning the co.za system into a world class Extensible Provisioning Protocol (EPP) registry.
- 2013-Awarded Best African Registry by Internet Corporation for Assigned Names and Number (ICANN) at the African Domain Name Industry Awards held in Durban on July.
- 2013– Becoming the first domain name registry to implement the Marks Validation System and introduce the concept of claims notices and watch services as a standard service for protecting Intellectual Property Rights in the domain name system.
- 2015- 1 million "co.za" registrations.

== Other sources ==
- https://www.registry.net.za
- https://www.africainonespace.org
- https://durban.registry.net.za
- https://capetown.registry.net.za
- https://joburg.registry.za
