= Nondumiso Mzizana =

South African dentist and businesswoman (born 1972)

- Born: January 6, 1972 (age 54)
- Education: University of Pretoria; Medical University of South Africa
- Occupation: Businesswoman

Nondumiso Mzizana is a South African dentist and businesswoman. A member of the Leadership Board of the Gordon Institute of Business Science at the University of Pretoria, Mzizana is a board member at the Northern Cape Economic Development, Trade and Investment Promotion Agency and at ZADNA, the ZA Domain Name Authority that regulates, manages and administers South Africa's Internet top level domain. The CEO of Sikelela Medical and Dental Supplies, she was the recipient of Businesswomen's Association of South Africa's Businesswoman of the Year for 2011, and was nominated as the most influential woman business leader in South Africa by African Business News.

== Biography ==
A qualified dentist, Mzizana was a senior lecturer at the Medical University of South Africa for 10 years before moving into business. She has been the CEO of Sikelela Medical and Dental Supplies since 2002.

== Education ==
Mzizana graduated from the University of Pretoria with a M.Sc. and from the Medical University of South Africa with a MB. Ch.D. She has a Diploma in Odontology from the University of Stellenbosch.

== Board memberships ==
A member of the Leadership Board of the Gordon Institute of Business Science at the University of Pretoria, Mzizana is a board member at the Northern Cape Economic Development, Trade and Investment Promotion Agency and at ZADNA, the ZA Domain Name Authority that regulates, manages and administers South Africa's Internet top level domain.
