= Nondumiso =

- Gender: Female
- Language: Nguni

Other gender
- Masculine: Ndumiso

Origin
- Meaning: "Praise/ Psalm"
- Region of origin: Southern Africa

Other names
- Nickname: Nonny

Nondumiso is a feminine given name meaning "praise" in the Zulu and "psalm" in Xhosa. Notable people with the name include:

- Nondumiso Cele, South African politician
- Nondumiso Mzizana (born 1972), South African dentist
- Nondumiso Shangase (born 1996), South African cricketer
- Nondumiso Tembe (born 1987), South African actress
