= Vika Mpisane =

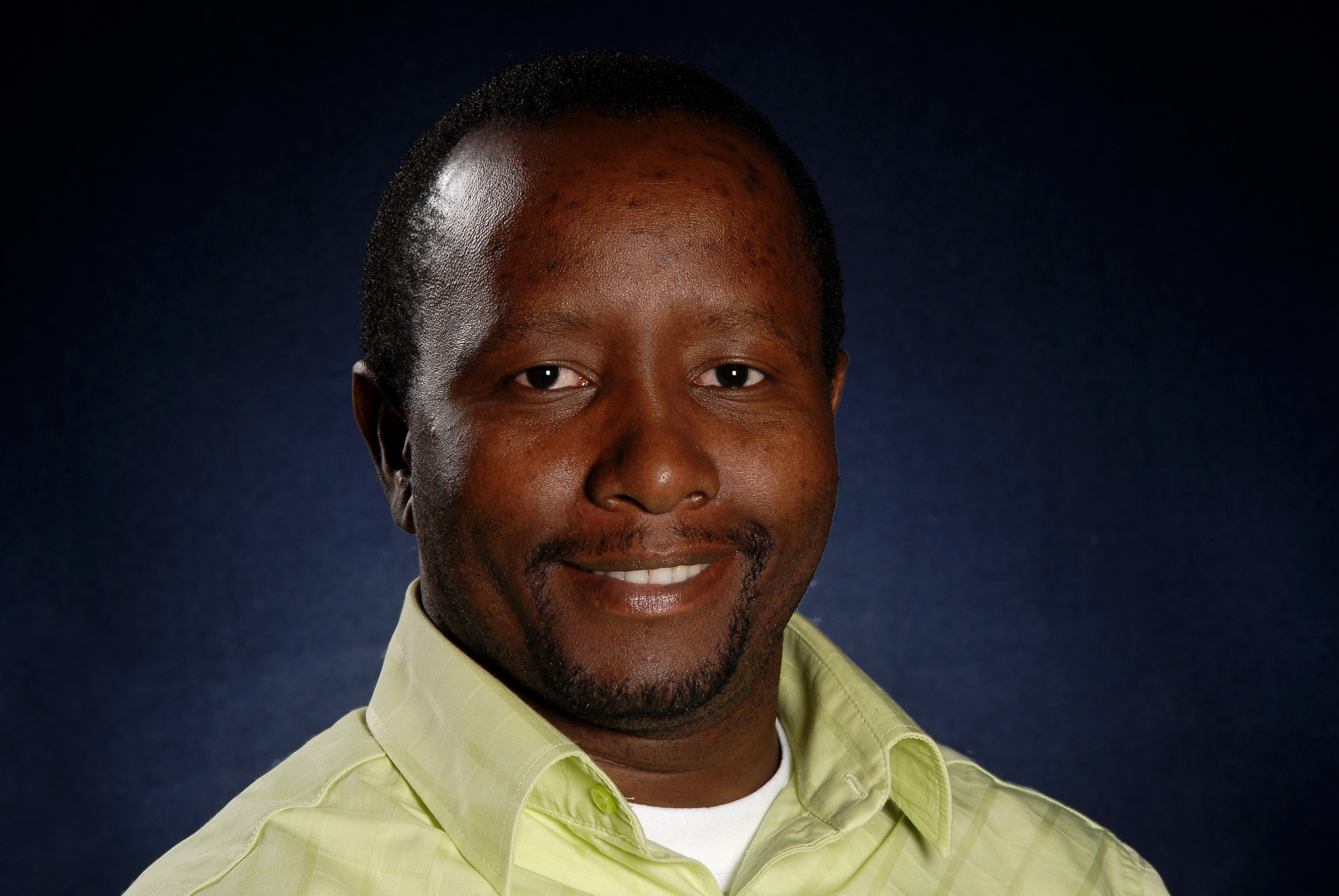
- Mpisane in 2009
- Occupation: Business executive
- Website: ccnso.icann.org/about/bio/vika-mpisane-dec08.pdf

Vika Mpisane is a business executive with extensive experience in the Internet sector and the general field of information communication technologies in South Africa and globally. He has extensive experience in policy development, business and sector transformation, strategy development, stakeholder relations, regulation and project management. His previous roles include serving a chief executive officer of ZADNA and as a Programs Director at NEDLAC. He is a former member of the board of directors of Africa Top Level Domains, and ICANN ccNSO Councillor. He was a member of the board of directors of Afrinic between 2018 and 2021.
