= Ndumiso =

- Gender: Male
- Language: Nguni

Other gender
- Feminine: Nondumiso

Origin
- Meaning: "Praise/ Psalm"
- Region of origin: Southern Africa

Other names
- Nickname: Ndu

Ndumiso is a masculine given name meaning "praise" in the Zulu and "psalm" in Xhosa. Notable people with the name include:

- Ndumiso Capa (born 1949), South African politician
- Ndumiso Mabena (born 1987), South African soccer player
- Ndumiso Madlala, South African brewer and businessman
- Ndumiso Mamba, Liswati Justice Minister
- Ndumiso Mvelase (born 1996), South African cricketer
