= Centre for High Performance Computing SA =

Research institute in South Africa

The Centre for High-Performance Computing (CHPC) was launched in 2007 and is a part of the National Integrated Cyber Infrastructure System (NICIS) in South Africa. The CHPC is supported by the South African Department of Science and Innovation, TENET and the Council for Scientific and Industrial Research. South Africa, in 2016, joined the Petaflop Club when the fastest computer in Africa was unveiled. Dubbed "Lengau", which is a Setswana word for Cheetah; this petascale system consists of Dell servers, powered by Intel processors

== High-performance computing ==
High-performance computing (HPC) refers to the practice of aggregating computing power/resources of several computing nodes in a manner that delivers much higher-performance computer power. HPC is measured in terms of floating point operations per second, or "FLOPS". HPCs are fast and can process thousand-trillion calculations (a petaflop). HPC clusters have vast amounts of every type of resource that can bought. Every CHPC is different, as much of the configuration depends on the vendor and their budget. Neighbouring countries, research centres, and universities can use Lengau to advance scientific discovery, while commercial firms can also improve their efficiency and competitiveness. The CHPC is a critical player in making national data-intensive research infrastructure accessible across the research and higher education sectors.

The CHPC offers high-performance computing facilities to academic and industry researchers who need to process data and perform complex calculations. During the pandemic, this CHPC contributed to worldwide efforts to identify the South African variant of SARS-CoV-2.

== Systems - Lengau (July 2016) ==
Lengau Cluster Specifications
Component	Details
System Name	Lengau (means cheetah in Setswana)
Launch Date	7 June 2016
Architecture	Dell servers, Intel Xeon processors, Bright Cluster Manager
Compute Nodes	1,368 nodes, each with 24 cores @ 2.6 GHz, 64–128 GiB RAM → 32,832 cores
Large Memory Nodes	5 nodes, each with 56 cores @ 2.2 GHz, 1 TiB RAM → 280 cores
GPU Nodes	9 nodes, each with 36 cores @ 2.2 GHz, 32 GiB RAM, 4× NVIDIA V100 GPUs (36 GPUs total)
Total Memory	~148.5 TB (compute) + 5 TB (large memory)
Storage	4 PB Lustre parallel file system
Interconnect	Mellanox FDR InfiniBand, 56 Gbps
Performance	Rpeak: 1.307 PFLOPS, Rmax: 1.029 PFLOPS
Management	Bright Cluster Manager

=== Procurement: 3PB Lustre ===
In 2020, CHPC tendered for technical support and an expansion to the existing storage via RFP No 3383/07/08/2020 - The Supply of 3 PB usable storage with Lustre filesystem and Lustre professional support to the CSIR.

== Systems - Sebowa (May 2021) ==
CHPC launched an OpenStack cloud service Sebowa in 2021, led by CHPC Cloud Lead Zama Mtshali.

== Flagship projects ==
The CHPC supports several South African flagship projects. Including the

- Square Kilometre Array (SKA), an international effort to build the world's largest radio telescope
- Student Cluster Competition, a program for undergraduate students currently enrolled in Science, Technology, Engineering and Mathematics (STEM) fields who are trained in high-performance computing skills.
- A state-of-the-art supercomputer simulations to study galaxies and their environments
- Advanced weather modelling with the South African Weather Service (SAWS)

== Student Cluster Competition ==
Students from the Science, Technology, Engineering and Mathematics (STEM) fields have the opportunity (every year) to learn more about the high-performance computing industry, and participate in the Student Cluster Competition. Winners get to participate in an international Super Computing Conference.

== Means of production ==
In the global north, the private sector has access to the means of production. It can process large-scale data sets, big data analytics & algorithmic data science methods on their HPC infrastructure. HPCs act as methodological gatekeepers, prescribing what forms of educational data science and methodological capital are permitted. Unlike HPC infrastructures in the global north, where the means of production often lies with for-profit companies or well-resourced private universities like Stanford. The CHPC is state-owned and prioritises computational resources and application support for any compute-intensive or machine-learning algorithms. The CPHC collaborates and shares computational clusters with neighbouring countries in the SADC region, to develop relevant human capital.

== Awards ==
In 2016, the CPHC was awarded the Readers/Editors Choice under the category "Best Collaboration Between Academia and Industry" from HPCwire.

== Incidents ==
=== 2026 cybersecurity breaches ===
In early 2026, the CHPC suffered two cybersecurity breaches in one week to the country's flagship supercomputer, Lengau.

==== Cryptominer #1 ====
Users first noticed performance drops on 25 May, 2026. After being notified by users, the CHPC technical team shut down and re-imaged the nodes.

==== Cryptominer #2 ====
A second repeat attack occurred on 30 May, 2026. This second incident forced the CHPC to perform further checks and another offline shutdown. This time, users were notified of a suspected intrusion. The breach came from compromised root SSH credentials.
