= .za =

Internet country code top-level domain (ccTLD) for South Africa

- Introduced: 7 November 1990
- TLD type: Country code top-level domain
- Status: Active
- Registry: ZA Central Registry
- Sponsor: ZADNA
- Intended use: Entities connected with South Africa
- Actual use: Popular in South Africa
- Registration restrictions: None in .co.za; various restrictions in other subdomains
- Structure: Registrations are only taken at third level beneath various second-level labels
- Documents: Articles of Association of ZADNA
- Dispute policies: Alternative Dispute Resolution (ADR), Additional information
- Registry website: registry.net.za

.za is the Internet country code top-level domain (ccTLD) for South Africa. The .za namespace is managed and regulated by the .za Domain Name Authority (ZADNA). Most domains are registered under the second-level domain .co.za.

ZA is an abbreviation of the Dutch name for the country of South Africa: Zuid-Afrika.

== Etymology ==
No official name for South Africa can be abbreviated to ZA, which is an abbreviation of the Dutch Zuid-Afrika. Dutch was considered an official language in the Union of South Africa until 1961; it subsequently lost its synonymous status with Afrikaans in 1983. Suid-Afrika is the standard spelling in Afrikaans, but the .sa domain is used by Saudi Arabia. Zuid-Afrika has a history of usage: the international vehicle code (sometimes referred to as Vehicle Registration Code, VRI) for South Africa has been "ZA" since 1936. ZAR serves as the ISO 4217 currency code for the South African rand. South African aircraft registration prefixes also start with Z.

== Second-level domains ==
.ZA has a Second Level Domain (SLD) Structure.

=== Approved ===
- .ac.za: South African academic and tertiary societies
- .co.za: general use by South African and non-South African persons and entities.
- .edu.za: South African further education training and private colleges and universities.
- .gov.za: South African government & its departments and entities.
- .law.za: South African legal firms.
- .mil.za: South African Department of Defence & its institutions.
- .net.za: primarily for network & internet infrastructure providers.
- .nom.za: personal names, not organisations.
- .org.za: primarily for South African non-commercial entities.
- .school.za: for schools in South Africa.
  - .ecape.school.za: Eastern Cape.
  - .fs.school.za: Free State.
  - .gp.school.za: Gauteng.
  - .kzn.school.za: Kwazulu-Natal.
  - .mpm.school.za: Mpumalanga.
  - .ncape.school.za: Northern Cape.
  - .lp.school.za: Limpopo.
  - .nw.school.za: North West.
  - .wcape.school.za: Western Cape.
- .web.za: general use by South Africans & non–South Africans.

=== Dormant ===
- .alt.za: Historical registrants.
- .ngo.za: for non-governmental organisations. New registrations pending .za DNA public consultation process.
- .tm.za: for trademarks. On hold pending establishment of the .ZA DNA.

=== Private ===
- .agric.za: ARC & Company.
- .grondar.za: Mark R V Murray.
- .nis.za: Network Information Systems.

=== Former (deleted) ===
ZADNA removed a number of domains from the .za zone on 7 August 2009:

- .bourse.za: for all companies which are listed on the JSE Securities Exchange.
- .city.za: for municipal governments.
- .cybernet.za: Infront Investments Five cc.
- .db.za: De Beers.
- .iaccess.za: Compustat.
- .imt.za: Institute for Maritime Technology.
- .inca.za: Internetworking Cape.
- .landesign.za: Lan Design (no longer exists).
- .olivetti.za: Olivetti/Mark Elkins.
- .pix.za: Proxima Information Exchange.

== Statistics ==
Currently around 29.39% of the .za internet is served via secured HTTPS protocol, with the Let's Encrypt Authority X3 being the most popular SSL certificate. Apache is the most popular web server, serving 66.56% of the .za domains, followed by Microsoft-IIS serving 11.60% of the total .za domains. The most common 1st character in domain names is "c", with 10.76% of .za domains starting with this character.

== See also ==
- .africa the officially designated top-level domain (TLD) for the African and Pan African domains
