= ZADNA =

.ZA Domain Name Authority (.ZADNA)
- .ZADNA
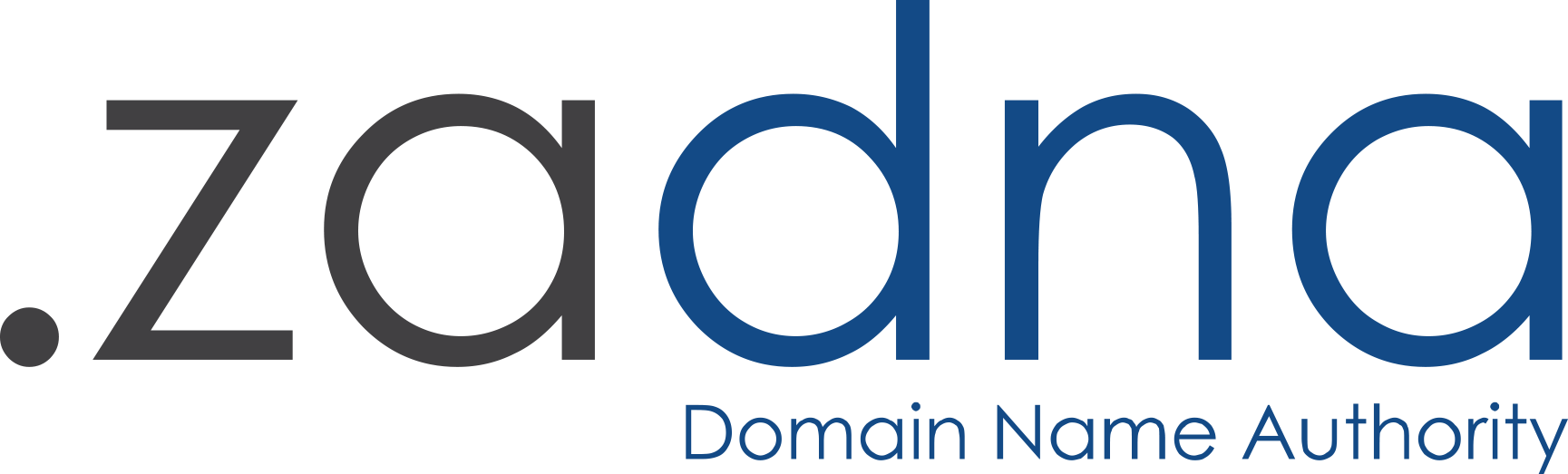

Agency overview
- Formed: November 1990; 35 years ago
- Jurisdiction: Government of South Africa
- Headquarters: 72 New Road, Glen Austin AH, Midrand, Gauteng, 1685, South Africa
- Motto: Your Online Presence is our business
- Minister responsible: Mondli Gungubele, Minister of Communications and Digital Technologies
- Deputy Minister responsible: Philly Mapulane
- Agency executive: Molehe Wesi, CEO
- Parent department: Department of Communications and Digital Technologies
- Website: www.zadna.org.za

Map
- .ZADNA location, Midrand

.ZADNA (.za Domain Name Authority) is a not-for-profit company and statutory regulator and manager of .za, the Internet country code top-level domain (ccTLD) for South Africa. It is an agency of South African government under the Department of Communications and Digital Technologies.

== .ZA domain information ==
.ZADNA is responsible for deciding .ZA second level domain (SLD) structure.

=== Moderated second-level domains ===
- AC.za
- EDU.za
- GOV.za
- NOM.za

=== Unmoderated second-Level domains ===
- CO.za
- NET.za

== .ZA domain name dispute resolution ==
.za Alternative Dispute Resolution (ADR) regulations to resolve .za domain name registration disputes.

.ZA domain name disputes types:

1. Abusive registration
2. Offensive registration

Alternative Dispute Resolution (ADR) only applicable to un-moderated Second Level Domains (SLDs)
