= List of mass shootings in South Africa =

This is a list of mass shootings that have occurred in South Africa. A mass shooting has various definitions, but is defined by South African police as an incident in which three or more people are shot with a firearm.

== Dynamics ==
South Africa has one of the highest murder rates in the world, at 45 people per 100,000 according to 2023–24 figures from the United Nations Office on Drugs and Crime. In 2024 alone, South Africa recorded more than 26,000 homicides—an average of more than 70 a day. Firearms are the leading cause of death in homicides. 63 people were killed every day between April and September 2024, according to police data.

Mass shootings in South Africa are mostly perpetrated by gangs, and are usually motivated by competition for turf and resources, as well as illegal mining. Another cause are the long-standing conflicts between minibus taxi associations in the country. They often result in revenge shootings. Taverns are often targeted. Several fatal mass shootings have also occurred in bars in recent years, with a majority taking place in shebeens, or illegal bars. In a major crackdown between April and September 2025, police shut down 12,000 such outlets and arrested 18,000 people.

Shootings, often relating to organized crime, are said to be fueled by alcohol sold at shebeens. Two of the most violent recent mass shootings; the Soweto and Pietermaritzburg shootings, which combined killed 20 people and injured 15 people, occurred at shebeens. Mass shootings in the country are not just confined to shebeens however, with two related mass shootings in the town of Lusikisiki, Eastern Cape, killing 24 people and injuring 9.

A lack of essential police resources has been discussed as a cause of the slowed response to mass murders in South Africa, and a lack of detectives preventing proactive analysis of crimes. A disconnect between policing and the communities they service has been pointed out as a possible influencing factor, as has the rate of certified firearm theft.

== List ==
Date	Location	Province	Dead	Injured	Details
6 May 1927	Charlestown	Transvaal	9–10 (Note: Including the perpetrator)	3	1927 Charlestown shootings: Stephanus Swart killed five policemen and injured one when they arrived to arrest him on incest charges. He killed his stepdaughter, a neighbouring farmer, and his separated wife while on the run before killing himself.
26 November 1931	Bethlehem	Orange Free State	6	6	Cornelius Johannes Petrus van Heerden, armed with a saloon rifle and a revolver, held up a car driver. After the driver resisted, van Heerden shot him dead, and drove towards Bethlehem, shooting people on the road. After he was pursued by police, he killed himself.
28–29 April 1975	Israeli Consulate in Johannesburg	Gauteng	4	51	1975 Fox Street siege: David and Charles Protter, two Jewish South Africans, took hostages at the Israeli Consulate in Johannesburg. David Protter surrendered the next day.
15 November 1988	Pretoria	Gauteng	8	16	Strijdom Square massacre: White supremacist Barend Strydom killed seven black men and an Indian man in central Pretoria, later saying he wanted to start a race war. He was later given amnesty and released.
20 January 1992	Ladysmith	KwaZulu-Natal	9	19	1992 Ladysmith shooting: After an argument at his family's farm, Kallie Delport killed his father and a housemaid before shooting at passersby in the neighbourhood. Most of the victims were black, increading racial tensions in the area increased. Delport was subsequently arrested and sentenced to 39 years in prison.
25 August 1992	Prison complex in Goedemoed	Orange Free State	9	4	On 25 August 1992, police constable L. S. Hasebeng, facing a rape investigation, killed eight people and injured four before killing himself. The dead included the commander of his station.
19 July 1993	Germiston	Gauteng	?	?	A taxi was ambushed near a hotel, with the attackers (carrying AK-47s) forcing all passengers out. They then separated members of the ANC and PAC political parties; they were then marched into the veld and killed.
22 August 1993	Germiston	Gauteng	13	16	Three men opened fire with AK-47s on a group planning a burial; the shooting was near the location of the attack the prior month, and the attack was likely motivated as revenge. Prior to the shooting, rumors had appeared in the area that there would be a revenge attack against Xhosa speakers. All victims were Xhosa speakers.
31 December 1993	Observatory	Western Cape	4	7	Heidelberg Tavern massacre: Three Azanian People's Liberation Army (APLA) operatives entered the Heidelberg Tavern and opened fire on the crowd, killing three students and the owner of an adjacent restaurant who went outside to investigate the sounds of gunfire. Seven others were injured.
26 July 1999	Anchor Comprehensive High School in Soweto	Gauteng	3	0	Charles Raboroko, a business economics teacher at Anchor Comprehensive High School, was alleged to have shot and killed three of his colleagues. He was charged for the crimes, but was eventually ruled unfit to stand trial due to paranoid schizophrenia.
16 September 1999	Tempe military base	Free State	9	4	1999 Tempe military base shooting: Lt. Sibusiso Madubela, a black soldier who had his pay suspended after he went AWOL following his father's funeral, opened fire at Tempe military base, deliberately targeting whites. He was then shot and killed by other soldiers. The resulting inquiry revealed widespread racial discrimination in the SANDF.
12 January 2000	Pretoria	Gauteng	3	4	De Wet Kritzinger, a white supremacist, shot and killed three black people, injuring four, on a bus in Pretoria. He was sentenced to three life terms and 40 years in prison. Barend Strydom, who had been released, showed up to support him in court.
9 February 2002	Mdantsane	Eastern Cape	12	6	On 9 February 2002, Bulelani Vukwana (also referred to as Bulelani Vukwane) shot to death 11 people and injured a further six in Mdantsane. Vukwana, a security guard, had arrived at the home of his girlfriend, who had broken up with him, to persuade her to come back to him. After she refused to see him, an enraged Vukwana went to a nearby shebeen, where he shot and injured the owner and killed another man. Afterwards he returned to his girlfriend's house, where a family function was in progress, where he shot her point blank. He started shooting randomly at motorists and pedestrians, killing several people. When he was spotted by police, he fired several shots at the officers and attempted to escape. He later killed himself by a shot to the head.
1 July 2002	Postmasburg	Northern Cape	4	9	Christo Brian Fortune, a dismissed policeman, stole firearms from a police station, and then randomly opened fire on the street and surrounding areas. Prior to the shooting, he had assaulted his wife. He was sentenced to four life terms.
20 January 2003	Cape Town	Western Cape	9	1	Sizzlers massacre: 9 people were killed and one was injured in an anti-LGTBQ hate crime.
19 October 2007	Polokwane	Limpopo	4	0	Samson Mocheku Tsamago, a driver for the Seshego Hospital, shot and killed 4 officials at the hospital, including the CEO, in a possible retaliation for his dismissal from the job following a fatal hit and run. He used a gun stolen from the hospital's security guard. He was sentenced to 18 years in prison.
14 January 2008	Skierlik	North West	4	8	2008 Skierlik shooting: Johan Nel, an Afrikaner teenager targeted black people in a nearby slum, killing four people, including two children, and injuring eight. He was sentenced to life in prison.
8 March 2020	Site B, Khayelitsha	Western Cape	7	7	Khayelitsha tavern shooting: Seven people were shot dead in the morning at a tavern. A 32-year-old suspect was arrested the next day.
2 November 2020	Gugulethu	Western Cape	8	1	A mass shooting occurred on the afternoon of 2 November 2020. It took place in a house in NY78, Gugulethu, Cape Town, South Africa and resulted in the death of eight people between the ages of 30 and 50 years old. One additional victim was injured in the shooting. Seven of the nine victims died on scene (3 women and 4 men) whilst an eighth victim died later in hospital. Local residents reported to the media that the shooting was related to a gang conflict between the Guptas and the Boko Haram street gangs. Other reports by local residents indicated that the killing was conducted by the Boko Haram gang targeting a local woman, killed on scene, who refused to pay extortion money to the gang. Whilst the Gugulethu Development Forum stated that the killings were "drug-related."
25 December 2020	Mount Ayliff	Eastern Cape	7–9	6–12	A dispute over minibus taxi routes was reported to have led to the shooting at the village of Mount Ayliff, Eastern Cape, on 25 December 2020. The attack resulted in the death of between seven and nine people, and at least six people were reported injured. According to reports most of the dead were from the nearby village of Nokhatshile. The SANDF was called in to assist the police in the search for suspects as they had escaped into the surrounding area following the incident. The following day six suspects, injured in the incident, were arrested. Seven suspects appeared before the Mount Ayliff Magistrates Court on charges relating to the incident on 28 December 2020.
9 July 2022	Pietermaritzburg	KwaZulu-Natal	4	8	2022 Pietermaritzburg shooting: Two men entered the Sweetwaters tavern and opened fire, before fleeing in a car. Two days later police arrested four suspects.
9 July 2022	Soweto	Gauteng	16	7	2022 Soweto shooting: A group of men armed with rifles and a pistol arrived and opened fire on patrons in the tavern. The perpetrators fled the scene and were not apprehended.
29 January 2023	KwaZakhele	Eastern Cape	8	3	On 29 January 2023 a mass shooting happened at a private home in the KwaZakhele township of Gqeberha. The two gunmen opened fire on the guests who were attending a birthday party before fleeing the scene, resulting in the death of eight people. Initially, seven people were declared dead at the scene with an additional four people injured. One of the four injured people later died of their injuries in a hospital. The South African Police Service stated that the motive for the attack was unknown.
28 September 2024	Lusikisiki	Eastern Cape	18	5	2024 Lusikisiki shootings: 18 people were killed and five others were injured in two mass shootings at two homesteads in Lusikisiki. The first mass shooting killed four, while the second shooting killed thirteen.
11 January 2025	Pienaar	Mpumalanga	8	3	A tavern shooting killed six and injured three, and two later died at the hospital.
12 January 2025	Gqeberha	Eastern Cape	6	1	Six men dead and one woman wounded.
19 April 2025	Marble Hall	Limpopo	1	4	Five people were shot during a live music performance at a tavern. The tavern owner, who was shot several times, later died in hospital.
1 November 2025	Boksburg	Gauteng	6	3	Six people were killed when gunmen opened fire in a drive-by shooting in the suburb of Reiger Park. Police investigation ongoing.
23 November 2025	Goodwood	Western Cape	1	3	Four men were shot while driving in a suspected gang-related attack.
6 December 2025	Saulsville	Gauteng	12	13	Ten of the people killed were pronounced dead on scene, while two others later died in hospital. Three children aged 3, 12, and 16 were among the fatalities. At around 4:15 a.m., at least three male gunmen entered an illegal hostel and started randomly firing at a group of people drinking. Police were not alerted until two hours later. The motive for the shooting is unclear. On 22 December 2025, a suspect was arrested in connection with the shooting.
21 December 2025	Bekkersdal	Gauteng	9	10	Nine people were killed and ten others were injured when a gunman opened fire at a tavern.
22 January 2026	Ntabankulu	Eastern Cape	4	1	2026 Ntabankulu Primary School shooting: A former deputy principal entered the staffroom of Ntabankulu Primary School and opened fire before turning the gun on himself. Three teachers were killed and another seriously wounded.
9 June 2026	Johannesburg	Gauteng	12	15	2026 Johannesburg shooting: Twelve people were killed and at least fifteen others were injured when a group of people opened fire in the informal village of Jumpers in Cleveland, a suburb of Johannesburg.
22 September 2026	KwaMakhutha	KwaZulu-Natal	11	3	Three men opened fire at a house party in KwaMakhutha, killing 11 people including a pregnant woman and injuring three others.
26 September 2026	Wedela	Gauteng	18	14	Eight men opened fire inside and outside a bar in Wedela, killing 17 people and injuring another 15. One of the injured later died, bringing the death toll to 18.
27 September 2026	Lwandle	Western Cape	10	11	A shooting at an entertainment venue in Lwandle left 10 people dead and 11 others injured.
