= 2022 in South Africa =

- Decades: 2000s; 2010s; 2020s
- See also: List of years in South Africa

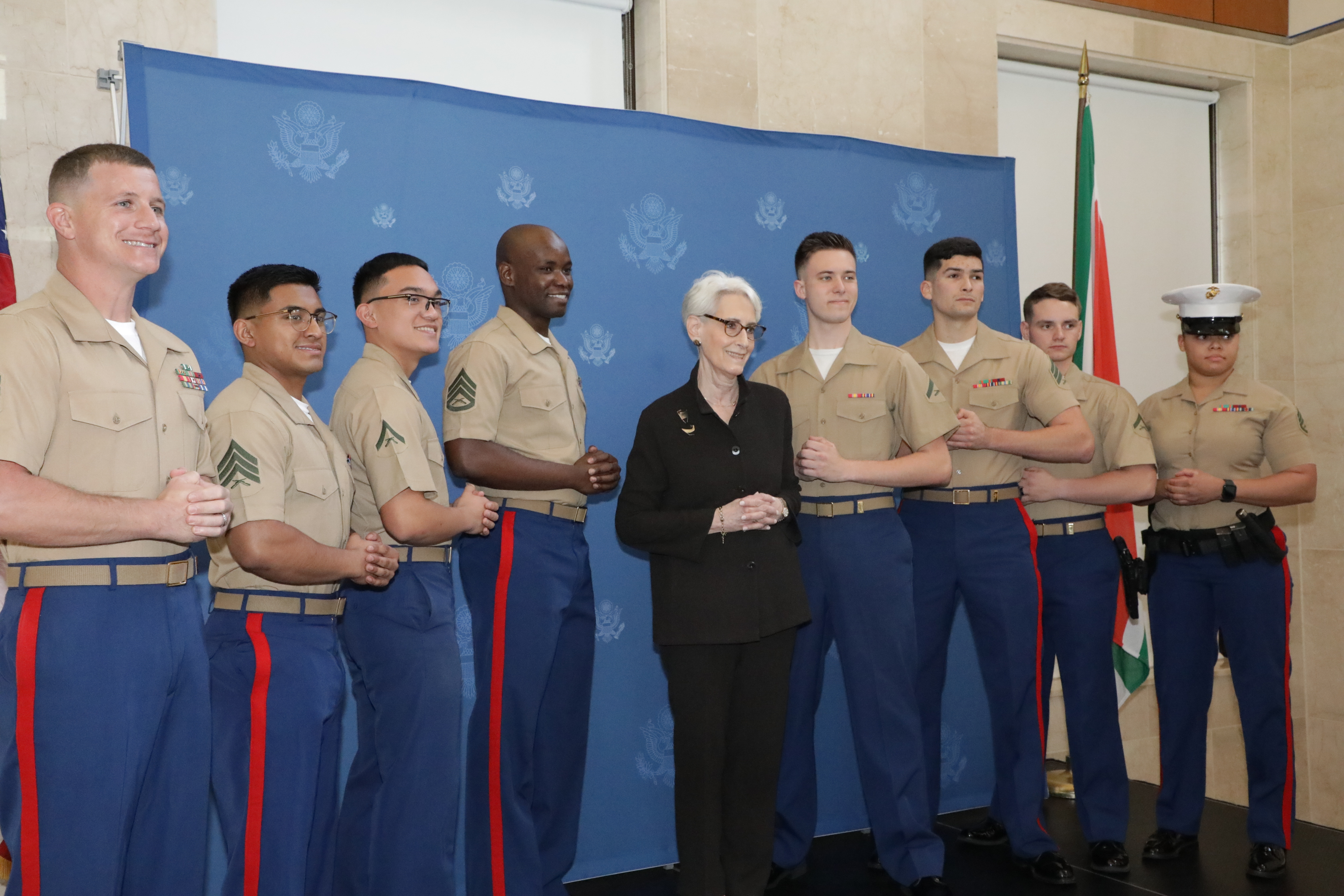
Deputy Secretary of State Wendy R. Sherman holds a meet and greet with employees of U.S. Mission South Africa in Johannesburg, South Africa, on May 3, 2022

Events in the year 2022 in South Africa.

== Incumbents ==
- President: Cyril Ramaphosa (ANC)
- Deputy President: David Mabuza (ANC)
- Chief Justice: Raymond Zondo
- Deputy Chief Justice: Mandisa Maya
- President of the Supreme Court of Appeal: TBA
- Deputy President of the Supreme Court of Appeal: Xola Petse
- Chairperson of the Electoral Court of South Africa: Boissie Henry Mbha
- Speaker of the National Assembly: Nosiviwe Mapisa-Nqakula (ANC)
- Deputy Speaker of the National Assembly: Lechesa Tsenoli (ANC)
- Leader of the Opposition in the National Assembly: John Steenhuisen (DA)
- Leader of Government Business: David Mabuza (ANC)
- Government Chief Whip (of the National Assembly): Pemmy Majodina (ANC)
- Opposition Chief Whip (of the National Assembly): Siviwe Gwarube (DA)
- Chairperson of the National Council of Provinces: Amos Masondo (ANC)
- Deputy Chairperson of the National Council of Provinces: Sylvia Lucas (ANC)
- Leader of the Opposition of the National Council of Provinces: Cathlene Labuschagne (DA)
- Chief Whip of the National Council of Provinces: Seiso Mohai (ANC)

=== Cabinet ===
The Cabinet, together with the President and the Deputy President, forms the Executive.

=== Provincial Premiers ===
- Eastern Cape Province: Oscar Mabuyane (ANC)
- Free State Province: Sisi Ntombela (ANC)
- Gauteng Province: Panyaza Lesufi (ANC)
- KwaZulu-Natal Province: Nomusa Dube-Ncube (ANC)
- Limpopo Province: Stanley Mathabatha (ANC)
- Mpumalanga Province: Refilwe Mtsweni-Tsipane (ANC)
- North West Province: Bushy Maape (ANC)
- Northern Cape Province: Zamani Saul (ANC)
- Western Cape Province: Alan Winde (DA)

== Events ==
=== January and February ===
- 2 January – 2022 Parliament of South Africa fire: A major fire breaks out at the parliamentary complex in Cape Town.
- 4 January – The first part of the final three-part report of the Judicial Commission of Inquiry into State Capture was published.
- 10 January – 2022 Eastern Cape floods: Flooding in Eastern Cape leaves at least 14 dead and displaces hundreds more in the region.
- 1 February
  - The JSC resumed its interviews for the next Chief Justice, interviewing Justice Mbuyiseli Madlanga.
  - The second part of the final three-part report of the Judicial Commission of Inquiry into State Capture was published.
- 2 February – The JSC interviewed Supreme Court of Appeal Judge President Mandisa Maya for the post of Chief Justice.
- 3 February – The JSC interviewed Judge President Dunstan Mlambo for the position of Chief Justice.
- 4 February – The JSC interviewed acting Chief Justice Ray Zondo for the position of Chief Justice.
- 5 February – The JSC recommended SCA Judge President Mandisa Maya to be appointed as the next Chief Justice.
- 10 February - President Cyril Ramaphosa delivered his State of the Nation Address at Cape Town City Hall in a joint sitting of parliament.

=== March and April ===
- 1 March – The third part of the three part report of the Judicial Commission of Inquiry into State Capture was published.
- 10 March – Acting Chief Justice Raymond Zondo is appointed Chief Justice of South Africa with effect from 1 April 2022.
- 16 March – President Cyril Ramaphosa recognised Prince Misuzulu Zulu as the King of AmaZulu nation in South Africa after a long court battle.
- 19 March – Dr Esther Mahlangu was attacked at her homestead. The attacker physically assaulted her and stole a safe that had a licensed firearm and an undisclosed amount of money.
- 22 March – The EFF opened a case against Operation Dudula leader Nhlanhla 'Lux' Dlamini after members of the organisation allegedly attached 59-year old Victor Ramerafe in order to provoke the EFF.
- 25 March
  - The trial of alleged parliament arsonist Zandile Made was postponed to 12 April.
  - Ntuthuko Shoba was found guilty of orchestrating the murder of his pregnant girlfriend, Tshegofatso Pule. The verdict was handed down by Judge Stuart Wilson at the South Gauteng High Court.
- 30 March – A motion of no confidence in the cabinet excluding the president sponsored by the DA failed to gather a majority of votes. 1 MP abstained, 131 MPs supported the motion and 231 voted against the motion.
- 31 March – The term of the National Commissioner of Police Kehla Sithole came to an end after a mutual agreement between him and President Cyril Ramaphosa was made earlier for him to step down. General Fanie Masemola was appointed the new Commissioner of Police.
- 4 April – The government lifted the National State of Disaster with effect from midnight. Other measures, described as "transitionary measures" remained for the following thirty days. These included the wearing of masks, limitations on gatherings and International travel.
- 8–12 April – Severe floods across KwaZulu-Natal leave at least 435 people dead.
- 26 April – The Parliament of South Africa created an Ad Hoc committee to oversee the management of finances and resources used to help those affected by the 2022 KwaZulu-Natal floods.

=== May and June ===
- 22 June - The Minister of Health Joseph Phaahla repealed the transitionary COVID-19 measures, including the wearing of masks, limitations on gatherings and International travel.
- 26 June – 21 people are killed in the Enyobeni Tavern disaster in East London, Eastern Cape.

=== July and August ===
- 9 July
  - 2022 Pietermaritzburg shooting
  - 2022 Soweto shooting
- 26 July – National Park ranger Anton Mzimba was murdered in an attack largely believed to be motivated from his rhino conservation work in the Timbavati Private Nature Reserve.
- 16 August during a speech Joseph Mathunjwa head of Association of Mineworkers and Construction Union said that South Africa was more functional during Apartheid under white people, than it currently is.

=== September and October ===
- 1 September - Lady Justice Mandisa Maya began her term as Justice of the Constitutional Court in the post of Deputy Chief Justice. Consequently, she resigned as President of the Supreme Court of Appeal
- 11 September - 2022 Jagersfontein dam collapse

=== November ===
- 21 November - the Constitutional Court ordered the release of Polish White Nationalist Janusz Waluś on parole. Waluś did the 1993 assassination of Chris Hani, General Secretary of the South African Communist Party and chief of staff of Umkhonto we Sizwe (MK), the armed wing of the African National Congress (ANC)

=== Holidays ===
South Africa has 12 public holidays; if a holiday falls on a Sunday, it is celebrated the following Monday.

- 01 January - New Year's Day
- 21 March – Human Rights Day
- 27 April – Freedom Day (National day)
- 01 May - National Worker's Day
- 16 June – Youth Day
- 09 August – National Women's Day
- 24 September – Heritage Day
- 16 December - Reconciliation Day
- 25 December - Christmas Day
- 26 December - Day of Goodwill

== Sports ==
Mamelodi Sundowns FC hosted the Egyptian Ahly Lahly at Johannesburg Soccer City Stadium and Sundowns won the match

== Deaths ==
=== January ===
- 22 January – Patrick Shai, 65, actor and director, suicide.

=== February ===
- 10 February – Nomakula Kuli Roberts, 49, television presenter.
- 14 February
  - DJ Citi Lyts, DJ, 32, gunshot wound.
  - Charles Yohane, 48, Zimbabwe-born footballer, gunshot wound.
- 22 February – Anna Karen, 85, South African-born English actress (EastEnders, On The Buses, Carry On), house fire.
- 23 February – Riky Rick, 34, rapper, suicide.

=== March ===
- 6 March – DJ Dimplez, DJ, 29, brain haemorrhage.

=== May ===
- 7 May – Siyabonga Zubane, actor, 23, suicide.
- 15 May – Deborah Fraser, singer, 56.
- 23 May – Jamie Bartlett, actor, 55.
- 31 May – King Zanozuko Sigcau, royal, King of the Mpondo people (since 2013). (b. 1974)

=== July ===
- 4 July – Bulelani Koyo, 39, broadcaster, cancer.
- 10 July – Busi Lurayi, 35, actress and presenter.
- 17 July – Jessie Duarte, 68, politician and acting secretary-general of the African National Congress.

=== August ===
- 17 August – Rita Ndzanga, 88, anti-apartheid activist and trade unionist.
- 29 August – Charlbi Dean, 32, actress and model.

=== November ===
- 20 November – DJ sumbody, South African Amapiano musician and record producer, shot

== See also ==
=== Country overviews ===
- History of South Africa
- History of modern South Africa
- Outline of South Africa
- Government of South Africa
- Politics of South Africa
- National Council of Provinces (NCOP)
- National Assembly of South Africa
- Timeline of South Africa history

=== Related timelines for current period ===
- 2020s
- 2020s in political history
- COVID-19 pandemic in Africa
- COVID-19 pandemic in South Africa
- COVID-19 vaccination in South Africa
- 2021–22 South-West Indian Ocean cyclone season
