= Hilton train station =

Railway station in South Africa

Coordinates: 29°33′13″S 30°18′06″E

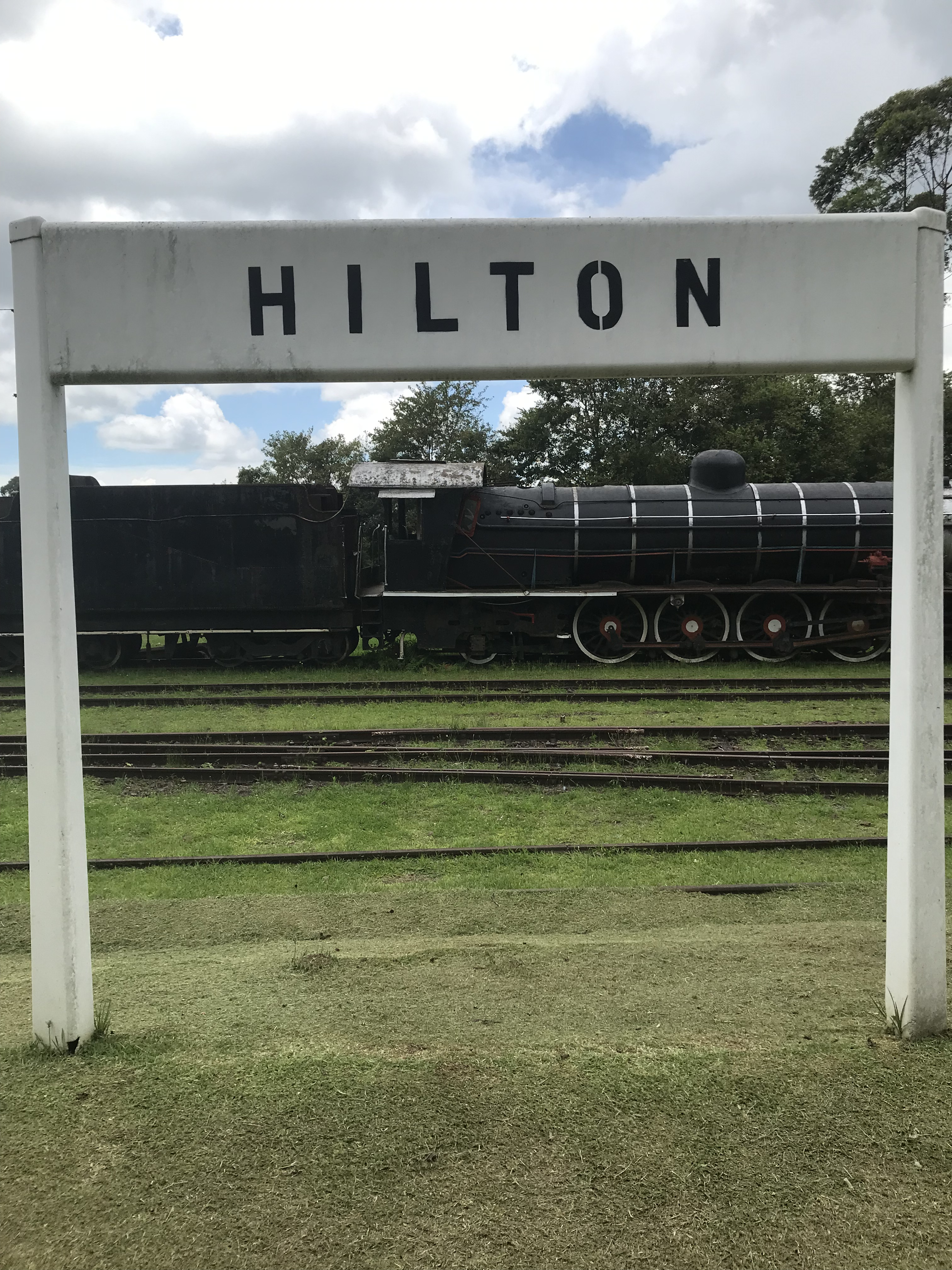
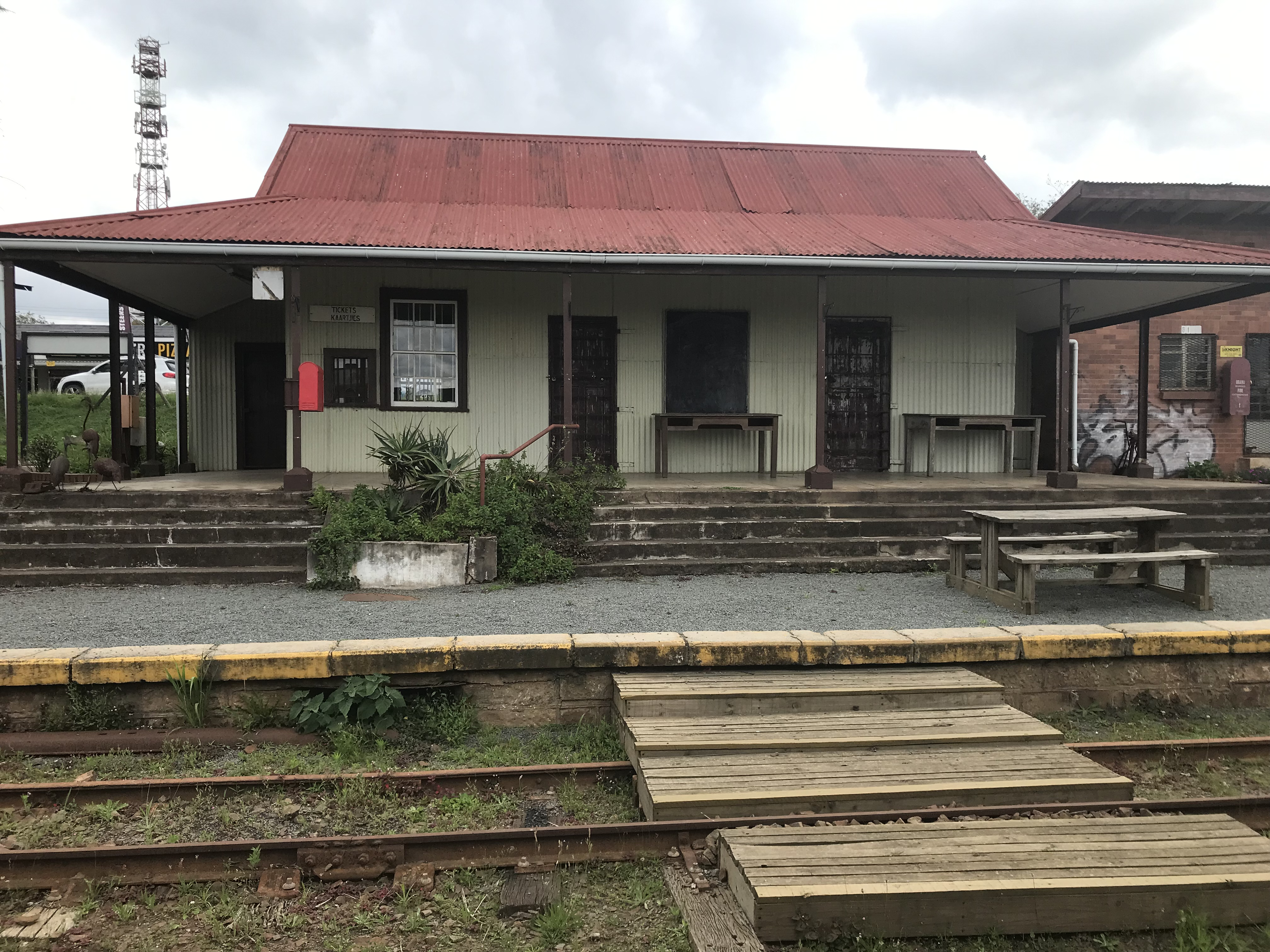
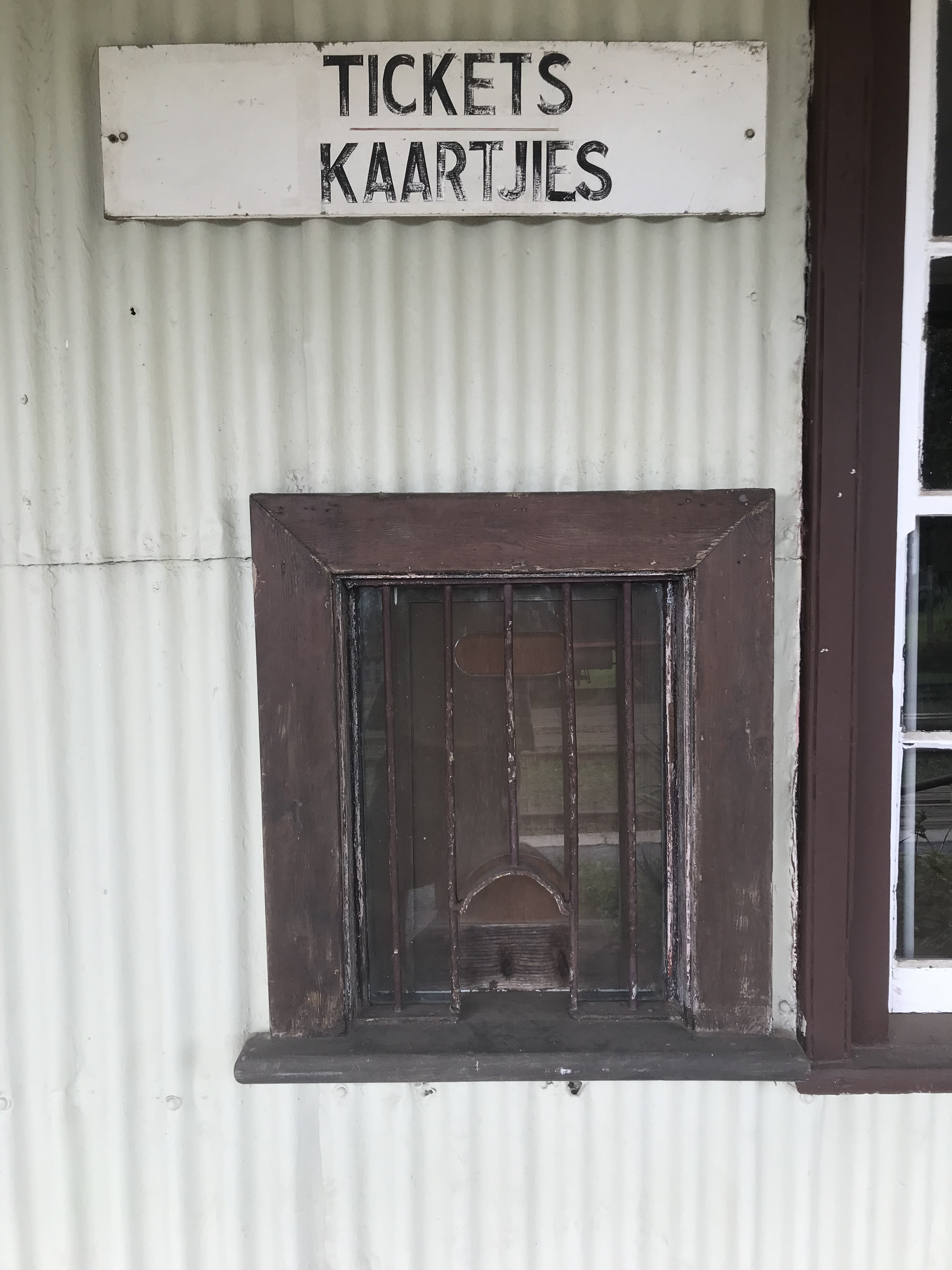
- Hilton Station with train The Station Tickets NGR railways map
Location

Hilton train station, also known as Hilton road station, is a historic railway station in Hilton, KwaZulu-Natal, South Africa. It began operating in 1888.

The main Natal Government Railways line was a 304-mile long railway built between 1876 and 1891, stretching from Durban to Pietermaritzburg to Howick (1884) to Estcourt (1885) to Ladysmith (1886) to Newcastle to Charlestown. The connection to NZASM (Kruger's Railway line) was finally secured in 1895, when Volksrust station was completed in December of that year.

The Hilton Station is reportedly the last surviving example of the type of stations used on this line. In 1916, the Town Hill deviation opened a second railway line up to the escarpment with a far gentler climb and so a more manageable gradient. This deviation bypassed the Hilton train station with two tunnels – the Town Hill and Hilton Road tunnels. In 1960, a third line was opened up with the Cedara Tunnel. This shortened the track length and improved the gradient. Flood damage in 1987 meant that the Hilton–Boughton secondary line could no longer be used. Although the Hilton road station has been decommissioned and not used as a train station since 1987, the precinct continues to be a popular museum and tourist attraction. The Hilton Steam Heritage Association (HSHA), a registered non-profit entity, manages the station precinct on behalf of Transnet, for adaptive re-use.

The station has also been used as a film location: It was used was used in 1982 for Gandhi and in 1995 for Cry the Beloved Country.
