= Saulsville =

- Location within Gauteng Location within South Africa
- Coordinates: 25.777°S 28.050°E
- Country: South Africa
- Province: Gauteng
- Municipality: City of Tshwane

Area
  - Total: 8.66 km^{2} (3.34 sq mi)

Population (2011)
  - Total: 105,208
  - Density: 12,100/km^{2} (31,500/sq mi)

Racial makeup (2011)
  - Black African: 99.1%
  - Coloured: 0.2%
  - Indian/Asian: 0.1%
  - White: 0.1%
  - Other: 0.5%

First languages (2011)
  - Northern Sotho: 28.1%
  - Tsonga: 15.5%
  - Zulu: 24.0%
  - Tswana: 6.9%
  - Other: 25.5%
- Time zone: UTC+2 (SAST)
- Postal code (street): 0125
- PO box: 0125

Saulsville is a subdivision of Atteridgeville in the City of Tshwane in the Gauteng province of South Africa.

== History ==
On 6 December 2025, multiple gunmen opened fire at a hostel killing at least 11.
