= 1992 Ladysmith shooting =

1992 mass shooting in South Africa

Ladysmith massacre
- Ladysmith (KwaZulu-Natal) Ladysmith (South Africa)
- Location: 28.5597°S 29.7805°E; Ladysmith, KwaZulu-Natal, South Africa
- Date: 20 January 1992; 34 years ago
- Attack type: Mass shooting
- Weapons: Ruger Mini-14; .357 Magnum revolver
- Deaths: 9
- Injuries: 19
- Perpetrator: Carel Johannes Delport

The Ladysmith massacre was a mass shooting that occurred in the Ladysmith, KwaZulu-Natal area on 20 January 1992, in South Africa, perpetrated by Carel Johannes Delport. Most of Delport's victims were black, and in the aftermath racial tensions in the area increased. Delport was subsequently arrested and sentenced to 39 years in prison.

== Shooting ==
The shooting began at the farm in Allerkraal after Delport had an argument with his father about the sale of three calves, and when his father showed him the money he had just received, commenting that he would give it to his stepmother, Delport armed himself with a .357 Magnum revolver. Delport killed his father with a shot to the chest on the veranda, then attempted to help him but he was already dead. Delport next shot the farm's housemaid, Makhozana Alzina Ntombela, in the kitchen and set fire to the mattress in his room and his car, which eventually caused the house to burn down. Outside, about 750 metres from the farm, Delport killed Msamaniso Mdladla and Petros Ndlala, the two black men who had come to buy the calves, and then drove to his stepmother's home in Ladysmith to set her car on fire, but when he failed to find it, he began shooting randomly at people in the street with a Ruger Mini-14.

Delport continued shooting at the parking lot of a shopping centre, killing a total of five people, including traffic officer Prithlal Rambally, who was hit three times, and wounding 11 more. When police arrived at the scene he sped away in his truck towards Newcastle and shot at commuters in a bus, wounding six of them. Delport was eventually arrested on a road outside of Ladysmith, after a short chase and a shootout with police, in which two officers were wounded. Besides the rifle, police recovered four 30-round magazines, the .357 Magnum revolver and more than 3,600 rounds of ammunition from Delport's truck. Most of his victims were killed with shots to the heart.

=== Victims ===
Those killed were:

- Marthiens Delport, 68, Delport's father
- Makhozana Alzina Ntombela, 40, housemaid at the Delport farm
- Msamaniso Mdladla, killed at the farm
- Petros Ndlala, killed at the farm
- Melusi Obed Zwane
- Mohamed Faruk Laka
- Enock Lucky Nyatahi
- Patrick Mbongeni Gumede
- Prithlal Rambally, 28, traffic officer

== Perpetrator ==
A photo of Delport.

Carel Johannes Delport was born in 1956 and known by his nickname, "Kallie", and as a child suffered from meningitis. Delport was declared unfit for military service for unknown reasons, and instead worked on the farm of his father, Marthiens Delport, earning 300 South African Rand a month. The farm was located in Allerkraal, a place outside of the city of Ladysmith. Delport reportedly had a history of mental illness and was twice charged with and acquitted of manslaughter after shooting two cattle thieves. His family had repeatedly asked his father to not allow him to own any firearms, but he declined their requests. Delport had 13 licensed firearms at the time of the shooting and was frequently asked by locals to participate in wildlife culling, because he was considered one of the best marksmen in the area.

According to an examination conducted after the shooting, Delport had an IQ of 78 and was suffering from borderline personality disorder.

=== Family ===
Delport had his father Marthiens, a brother named Willem, and a stepmother Eleonora. Delport had called his father a "hard and ruthless man" and accused of "casting him from his rightful place" when Marthiens had adopted a black boy two months prior to the shooting. Marthiens Delport had fathered an illegitimate daughter with a black woman, and once raped a 16-year-old relative, who afterwards unsuccessfully tried to commit suicide. Delport also had constant disputes with his stepmother, who struggled to tolerate his presence on the farm and wanted him to leave. According to Delport, his father often said that he was stupid and belonged in a mental institution, and was also not allowed to eat together with his father and stepmother at the table, instead had to have his meals outside the house.

== Aftermath ==
Most of Delport's victims were black, causing racial tensions to be increased in the area, and during his trial a crowd gathered outside the court and threatened to lynch him.

On 4 March, the trial was postponed to 18 March for a two-week-long psychiatric examination of the gunman. Dr. Anthony Dunn, chief psychiatrist at the Midlands Hospital, argued that Delport was not mentally ill during the shooting, but due to his low IQ, his inability to cope with stress, and his hatred against his father he was of partially unsound mind and lost all self-control. Prosecution accepted his mental incapacity, low intelligence and emotional imbalance to be mitigating factors and refrained from demanding capital punishment, instead asking for a long-term prison sentence during which Delport should receive psychological help.

Delport pleaded not guilty, claiming that he was of unsound mind during the shooting and fired at black shapes that were attacking him. On 21 October, he was found guilty after changing his plea, and on 29 October he was sentenced to a total of 39 years in prison, among them 22 years for nine counts of murder, and 12 years for 21 counts of attempted murder. The sentences run concurrently, meaning that he will be released after 22 years. Delport was also declared unfit to ever be able to obtain a firearms license.

== See also ==
- Barend Strydom
- 1999 Tempe military base shooting
