= 2024 Lusikisiki shootings =

Mass shootings in South Africa

- Location: Nyathi village, Ngobozana, Lusikisiki, Eastern Cape, South Africa
- Date: September 28, 2024
- Target: Women
- Attack type: Spree shootings · mass shootings · massacre
- Weapon: High-caliber firearms
- Deaths: 18
- Injuries: 5
- Motive: Unknown
- Accused: 8

The 2024 Lusikisiki shootings occurred on September 28, 2024 outside of two houses in the town of Lusikisiki in Eastern Cape, South Africa. 18 people were killed and 5 others were injured.

== Background ==
Lusikisiki is a town in the Ingquza Hill Local Municipality in Eastern Cape, South Africa

Crime in Lusikisiki such as robbery and rape is common. In 2021, Lusikisiki ranked 1 in South Africa in terms of the national crime rate.

== Shootings ==
The shootings occurred in the early hours of September 28, 2024. Gunmen opened fire at the lawn of two houses while 19 people were attending a family event, fatally shooting seventeen people in the head and injuring and hospitalizing six others. In one of the homes, nobody survived.

== Aftermath ==
2024 Godini shooting
- Location: Godini village, Qumbu, Eastern Cape, South Africa
- Date: October 6, 2024; ~22:45 (South Africa Standard Time GMT +2)
- Target: Community Policing Forum patrollers
- Attack type: Mass shooting
- Weapons: Rifles and handguns
- Deaths: 6
- Injuries: 4
- Perpetrator: Unknown
- No. of participants: 8
- Motive: Unknown

On the day of the memorial service for the victims on October 6, eight unidentified gunmen armed with rifles and handguns opened fire on a group of Community Policing Forum community patrollers, killing six people and injuring four others. The suspects are still at large.

=== Arrests ===
The first suspect was detained on October 3, 2024. Three suspects were arrested on October 6.

On October 9, prosecutors charged 45-year-old Siphosoxolo Myekethe with 18 counts of murder and one count possession of an unlicenced firearm, an AK-47 automatic assault rifle in connection with the shooting, but did not announce Myekethe's motive or connection to the victims.

On October 15, three other suspects linked to the shooting, 31-year-old Bonga Hintsa, 25-year-old Aphiwe Ndende and 33-year-old Lwando Anthony Abi were arrested.

The other arrested suspects are 38-year-old Zenande Paya, 36-year-old Mawethu Nomdlembu who were arrested on October 17 and 46-year-old Mzukisi Ndamase who was arrested on October 31.

=== Gun recovery ===
On October 17, four high-caliber firearms, three AK-47 automatic rifles and a .243 Steyr Mannlicher rifle were recovered by police.

== Victims ==
The victims consisted of fifteen women and three men. Fifteen women and two men died in the shooting, while a critically injured man died in hospital two days after the shooting on September 29.

The victims were identified as:

| # | Name (s) and Surname (s) | Age (s) |
|---|---|---|
| 1 | Mary Sinqina | 63 |
| 2 | Thobile Sinqina | 37 |
| 3 | Samantha Sinqina | 26 |
| 4 | Nancy Sinqina-Mhatu | 59 |
| 5 | Anita Dimpo Mhatu | 30 |
| 6 | Athini Talent Mhatu | 25 |
| 7 | Thabiso Smomoza Mhatu | 14 |
| 8 | Mathembisile Sinqina-Mayekiso | 64 |
| 9 | Mandisa Dlokweni | 37 |
| 10 | Nonkanyiso Dukuza | 21 |
| 11 | Nombuliso Dukuza | 34 |
| 12 | Nobelungu France | 46 |
| 13 | Ruth King | 21 |
| 14 | Lungiswa Gawulekapa | 51 |
| 15 | Thandeka Mhlawulivela | 46 |
| 16 | Tamara Vimba | 40 |
| 17 | Sigobodo Gxobela | 59 |
| 18 | Nomazwi Ndleleni | 59 |

A mass memorial for the victims was held on October 5, 2024.

== Responses ==
The South African Police Service launched a manhunt in search of the suspects.

SAPS police spokesperson Athlenda Mathe said "It's just a matter of time before we crack the case. So we have full faith and confidence that the team that is on the ground is capable. We have got the right expertise to ensure that we find and apprehend those that are behind these particular killings."

President Cyril Ramaphosa condemned the killings.

== See also ==
- 2022 Soweto shooting
