= One Settler, One Bullet =

Slogan of the armed wing of the Pan Africanist Congress

One Settler, One Bullet was a rallying cry and slogan originated by the Azanian People's Liberation Army (APLA), the armed wing of the Pan Africanist Congress (PAC), during the struggle of the 1980s against apartheid in South Africa. The slogan parodied the African National Congress's slogan 'One Man, One Vote', which eventually became 'One Person, One Vote'.

== History ==
The slogan was never officially endorsed by the PAC but often used by party members during rallies. After the dismantling of apartheid in 1994, PAC officials have repeatedly distanced themselves and the party from the slogan and called it a "war cry from its armed wing" incompatible with its "current reconcillatory stand".

By 1991, when the fight against apartheid neared its end, PAC General Secretary Benny Alexander attempted to redefine a settler: he called it a white or Asian person participating in the oppression of indigenous people. He classified people into three groups, "indigenous" people, Whites and Asians whose sole allegiance is to the nation and who have no home elsewhere, and "settlers".

However, even after 1991, grassroots sympathizers of the PAC at times interpreted the slogan as a call for attacks on whites in general and certain attacks on whites, such as the 1993 killing of US Anti-Apartheid activist Amy Biehl, were seen as directly motivated by the slogan.

In October 1999 during the funeral of former APLA soldier Sibusiso Madubela, the perpetrator of the 1999 Tempe military base shooting, which was targeted against whites, PAC supporters chanted the slogan. The funeral attendees were fired upon by police and three were injured.

In 2015, student activist group Rhodes Must Fall and other affiliated movements revived the slogan by chanting "One Settler One Bullet" at rallies at the University of Cape Town and by statements on social media.

== Variants ==
- "Kill the Boer, Kill the Farmer" - competing slogan, often used during the singing of the struggle song "Dubul' ibhunu," reportedly originated by Peter Mokaba of the ANC at the April 1993 funeral of assassinated South African Communist party leader Chris Hani.
- "One Merchant, One Bullet" - used by People Against Gangsterism and Drugs, an Islamist vigilante group in post-apartheid South Africa. ("Merchant" refers to drug dealers.)
