= Cedara Tunnel =

Tunnel in South Africa

Cedara twin tunnel
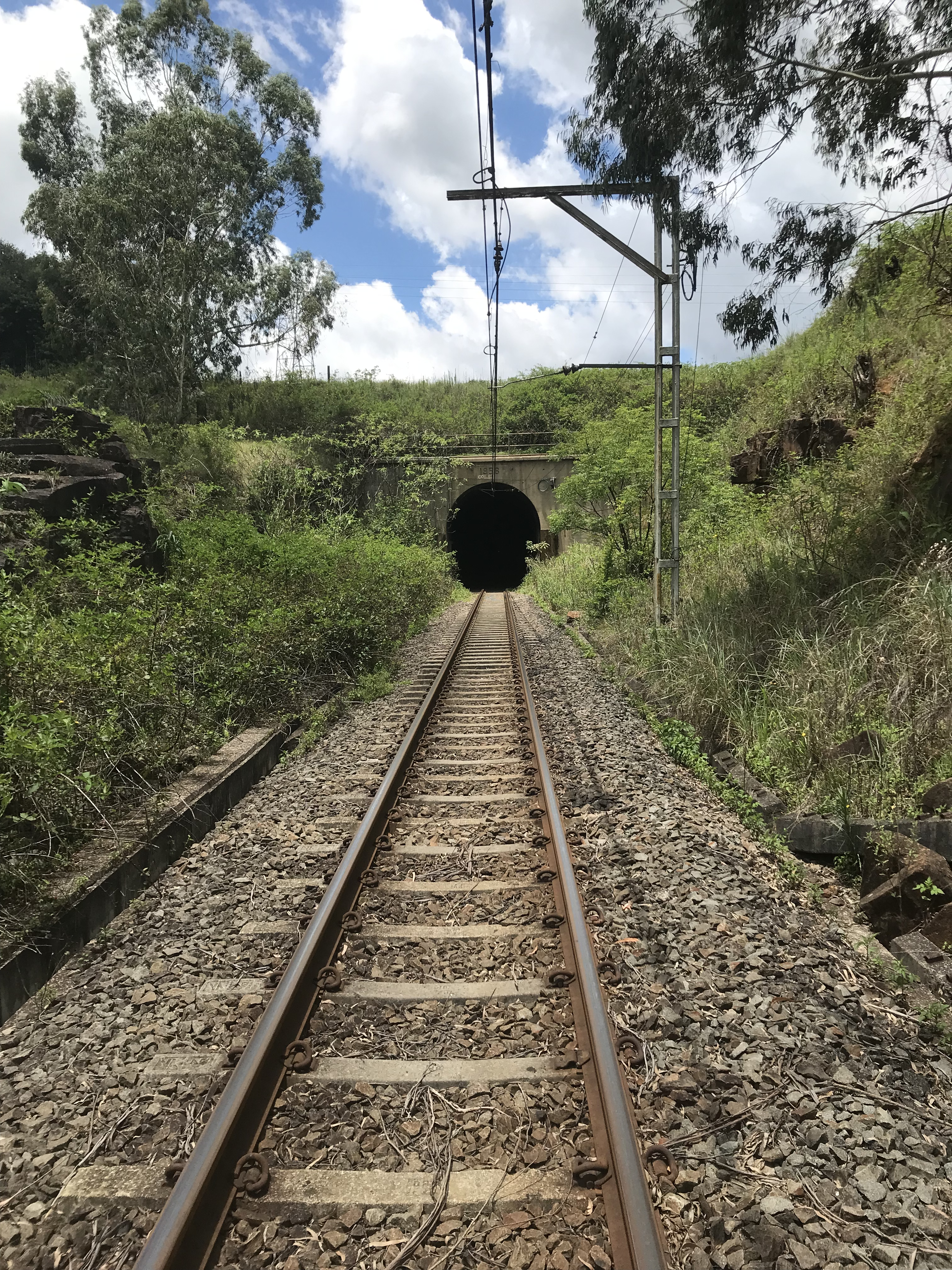
- The entrance to one of the Cedara Twin Tunnels. Image of one of the north portals.
- Interactive map of Cedara twin tunnel

Overview
- Start: Cedara, Howick (29.535174°S 30.272902°E)
- End: Winterskloof, Hilton (29.535174°S 30.304281°E)

Operation
- Work began: 1955
- Opened: March 28, 1960
- Owner: Transnet

Technical
- Length: 6.04 km (3.75 mi)
- Grade: 1 in 50

The Cedara Tunnel or Cedara twin tunnel is a 3.75 miles (6.04 km) long tunnel and was the longest railway tunnel in South Africa for 29 years, until the Hex River Tunnel was completed in 1989 (13.5 km (8.39 miles) long).

The Cedara Tunnel was formally opened on 28 March 1960 and replaced the existing single track on the old Natal Main Line (see Geographic data related to old Natal Main Line at OpenStreetMap), that ran through Boughton - Sweetwaters-Hilton as an open cutting. These tunnels were constructed using conventional Drill and Blast methods with concrete linings.

This underground infrastructure connected the Durban-Cato Ridge-Pietermaritzbug stations with the twin railway lines running from Johannesburg. The Cedara twin tunnel was constructed on a gradient of I to 50 and it shortened the existing track length by 6.8 km. The Cedara Twin Tunnels ( which replaced the older single track appears to currently be in use.

Today,South Africa's longest rail tunnel (approximately 15 km) is in Johannesburg, forming part of the Gautrain Rapid Rail System.

== External Media ==
The Cedara tunnel on the NATCOR mainline between Johannesburg and Durban. on YouTube
