= Murder of Tshegofatso Pule =

2020 murder in South Africa

In June 2020, Tshegofatso Pule was found shot in the chest and hanging from a tree in Durban Deep, Roodepoort. Pule, a 28-year-old South African woman, was 8 months pregnant at the time.

After an investigation, police established that her boyfriend, Ntuthuko Shoba was responsible for her murder by hiring a hitman to kill her. Shoba was convicted of conspiracy to murder and related charges in March 2022. A few months prior, in January, the hitman Muzikayise Malephane testified on his and Shoba's plan to murder Pule. Malephane had pled guilty to the murder in February 2021.

On July 29 2022, Shoba was sentenced to life in prison. The judge, Stuart Wilson, noted that there were no mitigating factors that would cause the court to deviate from the maximum sentence. The hitman, Malephane, had previously been sentenced to 20 years for Pule's murder.

Pule's murder generated public outcry on the high rate of gender-based violence and femicide in South Africa.

== See also ==
- Karabo Mokoena
- Frances Rasuge
