= 1999 Tempe military base shooting =

Mass shooting in South Africa

- Tempe military base (Free State (South African province)) Tempe military base (South Africa)
- Location: 29.0899°S 26.1873°E; Tempe military base, Free State, South Africa
- Date: 16 September 1999; 27 years ago
- Target: White people
- Attack type: Mass shooting
- Weapon: Vektor R4 assault rifle
- Deaths: 9 (including the perpetrator who was killed by other soldiers)
- Injuries: 4
- Perpetrator: Sibusiso Madubela
- Defender: Aldo Mattheus
- Motive: Revenge for his pay being suspended

On 16 September 1999, a mass shooting occurred at the Tempe military base near Bloemfontein, in South Africa. Lt. Sibusiso Madubela shot and killed eight people – including seven soldiers and one civilian – before he was shot dead by two soldiers. Four people were injured. During the shooting, Madubela at times pushed black people out of the way to shoot whites, and everyone killed or injured in the shooting was white. Prior to the shooting, his pay had been suspended following a period of absence without leave.

The shooting came after years of tensions in the South African National Defence Force over integration following apartheid, and a resulting inquiry revealed widespread racial tension and discrimination in the SANDF. The inquiry into the shooting revealed evidence that the shooting was a result of the suspension of his pay, and that Madubela had deliberately targeted whites. Other commentators suggested that the shooting may have had to do with previous grievances and the recent death of Madubela's father, in combination with the pay cut.

== Background ==
The shooting occurred at the Tempe military base near Bloemfontein. It was one of the first military bases to integrate following apartheid, and was one of South Africa's largest military bases. The base had experienced previous incidents: In 1996, a white soldier at the base locked three former liberation fighters in a room and attacked them with tear gas. Two years later, a white soldier robbed and killed two black soldiers while they transported military weapons. This theft was South Africa's biggest theft of military weapons from an army base, and was blamed on a right-wing group, Die Volk, that had been preparing a coup. Several other command actions at the base were deemed racially motivated, as well as instances of far-right activism at the base. An inquiry had previously found that the base had "poor levels of security and poor attitudes of personnel".

Racial tensions were rampant in the SANDF, contributed to by the fact that white officers occupied a disproportionate number of senior posts. A report to the South African Parliament made by the British Military Advisory and Training Team in the year prior to the shooting found that not enough change was being made to alter racial prejudice in the country, and that there were "far-reaching" implications to the hardening of racial attitudes by high-ranking soldiers in the military to the former guerilla fighters in their ranks. One of the injured later complained that it was difficult to get rid of underachievers, and that problematic soldiers were often transferred to other units, before being returned.

=== Perpetrator ===
Lt. Sibusiso Madubela, aged 28 at the time of the shooting, was a former guerrilla fighter in the Azanian People's Liberation Army, where he held the rank of captain. He joined the South African Army in 1994, one of 5,200 ex APLA members to join. Upon joining the military, he was demoted from captain to lieutenant, which he deeply resented.

Madubela was described as not fit to be an officer, and several complaints had been filed against him. Psychiatrist reports apparently indicated that he should not have been allowed to carry firearms. He was later described as "easily provoked, aggressive, undisciplined and arrogant", and as a loner who refused to socialize with colleagues regardless of race, though he had a clean record. He was unmarried and lived at the base. Madubela was described as being disliked by and disrespectful to both black and white soldiers, and often turned normal arguments into racial issues. According to his mother, he had been subject to racial abuse at the base, and had been stabbed by a white subordinate in a racial incident, though there was no record of the stabbing in his files. Madubela refused to salute or greet his military superiors.

Madubela's father died at the end of August 1999. From 30 August to 9 September, Madubela was AWOL, after he had taken leave from 23 August to 27 August, to attend his father's funeral. As a result of this absence, his salary was withheld due to an absence longer than three days, which meant he would not receive his pay for a month. His family later stated this infuriated Madubela, who claimed he had received verbal permission to extend his leave.

== Shooting ==
Victims

  - Maj. Jacques Coetzer, 31
  - Maj. Zirk Coetsee, 31
  - WO Reg Sieberhagen, 38
  - WO Johan Lombard, 49
  - SSgt. Doughie Douglas, 30
  - Sgt. Willie Nell, 27
  - Sgt. Tertius Lombard, 26
  - Marita Hamilton, 57

— Source:

On 16 September, Madubela arrived on the base, asking to speak with the commanding officer about his pay cut. He was informed that the officer was not present and would not be back for several days; he rejected the proposal to speak with another officer. Shortly after this, he signed for an R4 rifle, before locating ammunition, and then opened fire at the 1 SA Infantry Battalion. The first person shot was Captain Hannes de Jager, who was quadriplegic and used a wheelchair. Madubela approached him and aimed his rifle at him. After the door was shut in his face, he fired through the closed door. He seemed to be targeting specific people, and at certain times pushed black people out of the way to shoot whites, sparing more than 20 black soldiers he encountered.

Madubela then went on to move down the passage, shooting and killing military course administrator Marita Hamilton, and then Warrant Officer Reg Sieberhagen. He moved towards the office of Lieutenant Colonel Jan Wessels, who was in Pretoria at the time. He pointed his gun at his white secretary, but did not fire. He then proceeded to shoot and kill Major Jacques Coetzer and Sergeant Tertius Lombard. Major Zirk Coetsee attempted to give first aid to an injured victim, before Madubela shot him in the chest.

Madubela then ran out into the command offices and into the administration block where he shot and killed Warrant Officer Johan Lombard. He then proceeded to the duty room, where ammunition is stored, and killed Sergeant Doughie Douglas. Three other men were in the duty room; they saluted Madubela, then fled. It was believed he then reloaded his rifle. He then headed out past the base's bungalows, encountering Sergeant Willie Nell who he promptly shot dead and ran toward the transport park, shooting Sergeant Major Aldo Mattheus in the leg. Mattheus, also carrying an R4 rifle, shot back. Two other soldiers on their way to shooting practice backed him up and shot at Madubela, who was killed. (Note: Early reports suggested that he had killed himself.) Madubela still had 16 rounds in his rifle.

The shooting lasted 15 minutes. Seven were dead in the immediate aftermath and five were injured, all of whom were white. While everyone he killed was white and he spared black soldiers, he did spare some white people he encountered. One of the wounded, Major Zirk Coetsee, died a little over a week later.

== Aftermath ==
Reactions to the shooting were polarized; the immediate media response largely focused on race. In the aftermath of the shooting, the public was urged not to assume the shooting was racially motivated, though investigators said it "could be" racially motivated. ANC and military officials largely downplayed the racial element, and a ban was issued to soldiers on speaking to the press.

After the shooting, the minister of defence reported that crime was a rampant issue in the Bloemfontein command, which included Tempe. Soldiers were ordered not to speak on the record about the racial issues in the military. Siphiwe Nyanda, the chief of the Defence Force, commented that integration had generally progressed successfully, but that the shooting was "one incident which indicates that there are difficulties and problems which we have not quite surmounted". A retired colonel in the South African Defence Force, Jan Pretorious, said the shooting and incidents like it illustrated a clash of military cultures between blacks and whites, while a psychologist argued that both black and white soldiers in the military had been traumatized from the years of apartheid warfare.

The day after the shooting, Defence Minister Mosiuoa Lekota stated he saw no evidence racism had been involved, and denied statements Madubela had been absent without leave. Lekota visited the battalion and encouraged the soldiers, and explained to them what had occurred. The surviving members of the unit were debriefed by psychologists. Police declined to rule out race as a motive. The commander of Tempe, Brigadier-General Hans Heinze, called for calm in the aftermath of the shooting, and asked for the case to be thoroughly investigated before any conclusions were drawn. Lekota was one voice who proposed theories beyond race, pointing out the shooting was not premeditated and Madubela's recent loss of his father. Writer Pan Pantziarka argued that Madubela's sparing of some whites indicated that the race angle was not the entire story, pointing out the recent loss of his father, a commonality that he shared with several other spree killers. He noted he also shared with other spree killers a strong sense of grievance, whether real or imagined; Pantziarka argued that the combination of the grievance and the loss of his father made the wage cut a "final straw".

Politicians complimented Madubela as a "good soldier" and a "martyr". Motsoko Pheko, deputy president of the Pan Africanist Congress, stated that Madubela's death revealed that "this nation is living a lie" and that South Africa was "fed with propaganda that all is well". PAC was sympathetic to Madubela, with PAC provincial secretary Nkosinathi Mahala saying that "As the PAC, we don't have a problem with what Madubela did.". Within PAC the attack was blamed on white racism. The right wing in South Africa viewed the attack as an instance of black racist violence, and proof that different races could not mix. The Boere Weerstandsbeweging, a Boer nationalist party, decried the shooting as racist, and said South Africa had become a "survival struggle for the white man". The New National Party demanded an investigation, while the Democratic Party requested a parliamentary debate; the United Democratic Movement argued that the slow transformation of the military would lead to these kinds of incidents.

After the shooting, a Ministerial Committee of Inquiry was held to investigate the shooting, and whether there was evidence of discrimination or sectarian tension within the SANDF. The inquiry found that there was, manifesting in a variety of ways. The inquiry found that nearly 60 percent of military personnel were black, but 70 percent of officers were white. An advocate to the inquiry recommended that Mattheus and Anton Otto, who had killed Madubela, not face charges, while the three officers who fled should be prosecuted on charges of culpable homicide. Evidence presented to the inquest found Mandubela alone was responsible for the deaths, and that the shooting was deliberately targeted at whites; the shooting resulted from the suspension of his salary. The families of the victims sued the military for R5 million (then equivalent to 850 thousand US dollars) in damages, primarily for loss of support. Aldo Mattheus and Zirk Coetsee were awarded in 2003 for their actions during the shooting; Coetsee was awarded posthumously, and the award was accepted by his widow.

Other black soldiers viewed Madubela as a martyr; the French newspaper Libération said in 2001 that Madubela "continues to embody the malaise that is eating away at the [South African Army]". The following year, a black soldier at a base in Pietersburg threatened to commit a similar shooting against white soldiers, after which he was arrested. Other shooting incidents later occurred at the Phalaborwa 7 SA Infantry Battalion and Simon's Town naval base in Cape Town, which involved black soldiers shooting at white soldiers. There was a second shooting at the same base in 2003, and again in 2006, neither of which were racially motivated.

=== Funeral ===
Black soldiers at the base refused to carry the coffins of the victims, but stated they would attend the burial of Madubela. The funeral of one of the victims had to source soldiers from other bases. The Pan Africanist Congress demanded a full military funeral for Madubela; the pamphlet advertising the funeral featured a photo of him in a military outfit and concluded with the statement "One Oppressor, One Bullet". This was rejected by the defence ministry; however, PAC applied for an interdict to force the SANDF to give him a military funeral, stating that as his guilt had not yet been established and he had been a member of SANDF, Madubela deserved a funeral with "full honour" as a "dedicated soldier to his country" and that their action in denying him a funeral showed "clear bias". The military agreed to pay for his funeral, but refused to provide a guard of honor.

The funeral was planned to be preceded by a march to the Hadre police station demanding the release of APLA cadres. Achmat Cassim, the founder of radical anti-apartheid organization Qibla, and PAC MP Patricia de Lille were billed as speakers, though de Lille denied involvement and said she had not been consulted; she later denounced the ceremony. Ngila Muendane, secretary-general of PAC, said Madubela was a victim of racism and a "clean-living, decent young man", and that white racists controlled the SANDF.

His funeral took place 2 October, in Umata. At least 55 other soldiers attended his funeral. PAC supporters chanted "one settler, one bullet", and demanded police cease searching attendees for weapons. During funeral speeches prior to the salute, PAC officials promised to slay whites and stated that Madubela had sought to teach whites a lesson. During the funeral, Lethlata Mphahleli, former head of PAC's militant wing, encouraged black people to copy Madubela's attack, saying "[g]o and liberate this country the way Madubela did" and "[w]e are going to hit the Boers." Some 2,000 people attended his funeral; the crowds scattered after two shots were fired during a 12-gun salute, which had been forbidden by the police, by mourners seeking to honour Madubela. Police fired ammunition and tear gas; the police superintendent stated the ammunition was fired into the air. Three were wounded. Army helicopters provided police reinforcements. Swayi Mqojana, a PAC official, said in an interview after the funeral that the government's actions were a declaration of war on PAC.

== See also ==
- Strijdom Square massacre, racially motivated shooting against black people
- 2008 Skierlik shooting
