= Enyobeni Tavern disaster =

2022 crowd disaster in South Africa

- Scenery Park township (South Africa)
- Date: 26 June 2022
- Location: East London, South Africa
- Cause: Under investigation
- Deaths: 21
- Injuries: 4

On the early morning hours of 26 June 2022, 21 people died during celebrations at the Enyobeni Tavern, a shebeen in East London, Eastern Cape, South Africa. Four more people were injured. No official causes of death have been publicly released.

== Background ==
The Enyobeni Tavern was a two-storey tavern located in the township of Scenery Park, East London, Eastern Cape, amidst densely populated residences. The building in the past had received numerous complaints from local residents due to its late closing hours and excessive noise. Although the legal drinking age in South Africa is 18, the tavern reportedly sold alcohol to minors.

A promotional Facebook post for the weekend party at the tavern drew media attention after the incident as it concluded with "kuzofiwa", which, in a party context, is a slang term for, 'It's going to be a great time'. Its literal translation in isiXhosa and isiZulu however, is: 'There is going to be death'.

== Incident ==
During a celebration of hlanjwa iphepha ('pens down'), an informal tradition in South Africa that celebrates the end of school exams, multiple people died reportedly from asphyxiation in the Enyobeni tavern on 26 June 2022. Initial reports suggested a crowd crush, but this was not confirmed by investigation authorities. The owner of the bar, Siyakhangela Ngevu, who was not present when the deaths occurred, stated that he had received calls from security at around 1 a.m., informing him of people attempting to force their way through a gate outside of the tavern. Promise Matinise, the entertainment manager of the tavern, said they had a lack of manpower to deal with overcrowding and that some patrons tried to force their way in. Matinise witnessed people falling while bouncers failed to control the large crowd and stated he contacted the owner upon discovering that the people were dead. Videos of the venue prior to the disaster show that it was packed with young people, with many appearing to be underage.

An 18-year-old patron told Al Jazeera that when the venue became overcrowded, security instructed people to leave, to no avail. The patron stated that a security guard closed the doors and sprayed a chemical into the crowd. The patron said they were unable to breathe and that "we suffocated for a long time and [were] pushing each other but there was no use because some people were dying". The substance reportedly "smelled like gas". An injured grade 11 witness said that he was robbed of personal belongings as he laid trapped by other victims.

Another 17-year-old recounted: "We were told to wear black and white. It was a DJ's birthday party. While we were sitting inside at around 12 a.m., someone sprayed pepper spray and we ran out. We didn't see who sprayed the pepper spray but we were told it was the owner and he wanted us to leave. We left and went to another place. When we came back again, the door was locked and the bouncer wouldn't let us in because it was already packed inside." A 19-year-old eyewitness told Agence France-Presse: "We tried moving through the crowd, shouting 'please let us through’, and others were shouting 'we are dying, guys', and 'we are suffocating' and 'there are people who can't breathe'". She then passed out, describing that "there was a strong smell of some type of spray in the air. We thought it was pepper spray."

At 4 a.m., a call was placed by a witness reporting that there were multiple deaths at the tavern. Seventeen victims, the youngest being 13, were found on the dance floor and in chairs, couches, and tables, but with no obvious signs of injury. Two victims died at a local clinic, and two more victims died while or after being evacuated to a hospital.

== Victims ==
Nine girls and twelve boys aged between 13 and 21 died in the disaster. After emergency services were called, four people were taken to hospital, but the cause of deaths and injuries was unclear as of 26 June and an investigation had begun. Parents were asked to identify their children at a mortuary. Minister of Police Bheki Cele said, "It's a disaster. Twenty-one of them. Too many."

As of 27 June, four people were hospitalised in a critical condition. Other survivors were treated for backache, tight chests, vomiting and headaches. Officials urged parents of survivors to take them to hospital for a medical checkup.

These are the names of the pupils who died on 26 June 2022 at Enyobeni Tavern.

| # | Date of birth | Age | Name |
|---|---|---|---|
| 1 | 10 December 2001 | 20 years | Lithemba Velaphi |
| 2 | 17 November 2003 | 18 years | Mbulelo Rhangile |
| 3 | 12 March 2004 | 18 years | Inathi Nkani |
| 4 | 10 April 2004 | 18 years | Kungentando Nzima |
| 5 | 5 July 2004 | 17 years | Ovayo Mateyise |
| 6 | 9 July 2004 | 17 years | Bongolethu Ncandana |
| 7 | 30 August 2004 | 17 years | Anathi Ngqoza |
| 8 | 13 November 2004 | 17 years | Sinothando Mgangala |
| 9 | 29 November 2004 | 17 years | Simamkele Sobetwa |
| 10 | 28 February 2005 | 17 years | Aluncedo Monela |
| 11 | 6 March 2005 | 17 years | Simele Bolsiki |
| 12 | 6 May 2005 | 17 years | Esinako Sinarhana |
| 13 | 22 August 2005 | 16 years | Oyena Ngoloyi |
| 14 | 28 November 2005 | 16 years | Lungile Bekiso |
| 15 | 18 December 2005 | 16 years | Asamkele Thukuthe |
| 16 | 21 January 2006 | 16 years | Azizipho Zilindile |
| 17 | 17 February 2006 | 16 years | Inamandla Wexu |
| 18 | 4 July 2006 | 15 years | Lilitha Methuko |
| 19 | 2 April 2007 | 15 years | Sisanda Mahlahlaka |
| 20 | 21 August 2007 | 14 years | Sisekela Tshemese |
| 21 | 23 February 2008 | 14 years | Thembinkosi Silwane |

== Investigation ==
In the immediate aftermath of the incident, an investigation was opened into the probable causes of the deaths. Samples from the bodies of the victims were taken to toxicology laboratories in Cape Town for analysis. The South African Police Service released a statement regarding the incident and stated that they would be deploying "maximum resources" to the investigation, and also said the public should not speculate on the cause of death. Police guarded the tavern scene in the days after the incident to prevent tampering.

A provincial safety officer said that since there were no visible injuries on the bodies, the cause of the deaths was likely not a stampede. A spokesperson for the Eastern Cape's provincial community safety department went on to state that they were ruling out a stampede entirely and that the most likely cause of death was either poison or asphyxia related, pointing out CCTV footage showing hookah pipes at the tavern. Eastern Cape MEC for Safety Weziwe Tikana ruled out a stampede because "there were three young people who were coming to speak to us when we got to the scene, and they fainted along the way. One of them has since died while en-route to hospital. This means what they consumed remained in their bodies." An Eastern Cape police spokesperson then later said the main cause was either something ingested or inhaled.

On 29 June, news reports said the investigators suspect carbon monoxide poisoning from a petrol generator that was operating in the tavern after a power outage in the area. While postmortem examinations have not yet been completed, the chief medical officer at the local mortuary said the bodies showed signs of "chemical asphyxia". However, a different official in the forensic pathology services said "It is highly unlikely that the cause of death was through fumes from a generator. But we are still waiting for toxicology results." On 6 July, an Eastern Cape Department of Health official said that a stampede had been ruled out but that more time would be needed to determine cause of death. A forensic pathology team examined the tavern where 17 bodies were found. Postmortems were performed the same day.

On 19 July, it was reported that methanol was present in the bodies of all 21 of the deceased. "Alcohol poisoning" and carbon monoxide have been ruled out. Dr. Litha Matiwane, Eastern Cape provincial deputy director for clinical service, stated authorities are still examining whether the found levels of this toxic chemical were lethal, or whether an additional factor leading to death was involved.

In September, the families of the victims rejected the findings of an official toxicology report, which ascribed the deaths to suffocation. The Eastern Cape Department of Health briefed family members on the findings of the toxicology reports, but did not provide written documentation. This has upset the family members.

== Legal ==
The Eastern Cape Liquor Board (ECLB) said it would lay criminal charges against the owner of the Enyobeni Tavern, and revoke the liquor licence of the tavern. Board CEO Nombuyiselo Makala stated that the owner flagrantly violated the Liquor Act by serving alcohol to minors. The tavern was found by the Buffalo City Metropolitan Municipality to have been built illegally. The city has not received any land-use application, nor has it granted any departure for operating a tavern at the location. The outcome of the ongoing investigation, as of 3 July, will determine whether the tavern will be demolished.

The owner of the club and two employees have been arrested after the ECLB opened a criminal case for allegedly selling alcohol to minors.

The owner and her husband, who was the tavern's manager, have been charged with two offences of selling or supplying liquor to minors, and conniving with or allowing their employees and agents to do so as well.

On 23 February 2024, the club's owners were ordered to pay a R5000 fine or serve 100 days imprisonment.

== Aftermath ==
The Buffalo City South African National Civic Organisation (SANCO) branch and the ANC Scenery Park branch held a meeting on 28 June 2022 following which they held a night vigil in front of the tavern, praying for the deceased as well as sickened victims. Buffalo City Metropolitan Municipality said it would provide grave sites free of charge for the victims, and local funeral provider Avbob pledged to donate coffins, transportation, and assist with burial.

On 29 June, the government stated autopsies have been completed on all victims and that samples were sent to a Western Cape lab for further investigation.

On 30 June, police allowed the tavern owner and his wife access to the bar and they loaded bakkies up with alcohol from the premises. The owner permitted media to enter the tavern as well, who reported that in the VIP area on the second floor they observed "Happy Birthday" balloons and broken chairs across the floor. On the same day, the Scenery Park Methodist Church prayed outside the building, and called on law enforcement to provide answers on what caused the disaster so that the families of the victims could get some closure.

On 6 July, thousands attended a mass funeral service for the 21 victims. President Cyril Ramaphosa and other dignitaries spoke at the gathering. While 21 coffins were present in the service, 19 were empty and present as symbolic, only two victims being buried that day with the rest scheduled for burial later in private ceremonies by their families. The Economic Freedom Fighters party criticised the government for holding a "fake" funeral, against the wishes of the families and with empty coffins, and questioned how much the province had spent on it. A Metro spokesperson said no actual body was displayed in public in accordance with the families' wishes. The last victim was buried on Sunday, 10 July.

Buffalo City has called on alcohol outlets to strictly enforce entry requirements and require IDs to screen out underage drinking. More than a thousand establishments in the metro are registered with the provincial Liquor Board.

Four suspects have been accused of stealing the victims' belongings. One of them, a minor, was released to his parents and will be dealt with according to the Children's Act. The other three have been arrested and denied bail.

On 10 July 2026, the East London Regional Court found Siyakhangela and Vuyokazi liable for the Enyobeni Tavern tragedy.

== Reactions ==
The president of South Africa, Cyril Ramaphosa, offered his condolences to the victims of the disaster. Siyakhangela Ngevu (the owner of the tavern), who was not present when the deaths occurred, apologised and called for calm. Ngevu stated that he "sympathised with the people who have lost their loved ones" and that it "wasn't my intention for this to happen".

The National Youth Development Agency (NYDA) questioned whether the country learned anything from the 2000 Throb nightclub disaster in Chatsworth, in which 13 children were killed. The NYDA said that at that time people questioned what underage children were doing in a nightclub, and now over twenty years later the country is facing the same type of tragedy with underage children at a nightclub, demonstrating "our lack of progress as a country". The NYDA called for a swift and transparent investigation, and called on parents to work with law enforcement and report such underage activity.

SANCO called on the government to declare Scenery Park a disaster area. Buffalo City regional treasurer Nomthunzi Mbiko said there were prior complaints about the tavern: "We visited the Scenery Park police station many times complaining about the tavern and the ECLB. The police and ECLB must also come forward to explain to us how [they gave] the owner of the tavern the licence and who signed the documents."

The Concerned Tshwane Liquor Traders Association called for enforcement against underage drinking and recommended increasing the legal drinking age from 18 to 21.
