= Avbob =

South African funeral and insurance company

Avbob (Afrikaanse Verbond Begrafnisonderneming Beperk) is a South African funeral company and insurance business.

== Background ==
In 1916, the Afrikaans Association was founded by the Dutchman Jacobus Vogelsang in Bloemfontein with the aim of promoting the interests of the Afrikaner in general. The year 1918 was the height of the Spanish flu in South Africa and the Association established a provident fund for its members to cover funeral expenses and assist the next of kin.

== History ==
The Afrikaanse Verbond then took over a struggling firm of undertakers in Bloemfontein and this culminated in December 1921 in the establishment of the Afrikaanse Verbond Begrafnisonderneming Beperk, commonly known by the acronym Avbob. It was one of the Afrikaanse pioneer companies in the Orange Free State and gradually opened branches throughout the country. This firm of undertakers did much to get the Afrikaner involved in the business world. H.H. van Rooijen. a founding member of the Afrikaanse Verbond, was the first managing director until he was succeeded in 1944 by his son, W.J. van Rooijen. As early as 1947, the organisation was already selling funeral policies to members of all cultural groups in the country. In 1951, Avbob was converted into an insurance company with its head office in Pretoria.

== State funeral ==
The first state funeral that Avbob was involved with was in 1922 with the burial of Gen. Christiaan de Wet. Since then, the firm has been involved with all funerals of heads of government and state in the country, including that of Nelson Mandela in 2013.

== Avbob establishment ==
Avbob foundation has been dedicated to social development since 2012. It provides school libraries housed in converted shipping containers to certain communities. Through its Avbob Poetry Project, the AVBOB poetry competition is held every year to obtain good poems from all language groups in the country. Four anthologies have already been published under the title I wish I'd said.

== H.H van Rooijen ==
Hendrikus Hermanus van Rooijen (Emmen, Netherlands, 21 December 1868 – Bloemfontein, 17 December 1952) came to the South African Republic in 1897 as a teacher. He later became a writer of school textbooks and a businessman. Despite his poor eyesight, Van Rooijen was involved in a number of community actions. His involvement in the organised teaching corps resulted in the founding of the Transvaal Teachers' Association (the T.O.). He was also a co-founder of the Afrikaans Verbond Spaar- en Voorskotkas, later known as Sasbank.
