= 2022 Pietermaritzburg shooting =

Mass shooting in South Africa

- Pietermaritzburg (South Africa)
- Location: Pietermaritzburg, KwaZulu-Natal, South Africa
- Date: 9 July 2022
- Attack type: Mass shooting
- Weapon: 9mm pistol
- Deaths: 4
- Injuries: 8
- Perpetrators: 2 suspects arrested; names withheld
- No. of participants: 2–4

On 9 July 2022, a mass shooting occurred at the Samukelisiwe tavern at Sweetwaters in Pietermaritzburg, KwaZulu-Natal, South Africa. The shooting left four people dead and eight others injured.

== Shooting ==
At about 8:30 pm, two men entered Sweetwaters tavern in Pietermaritzburg, where they shot 12 patrons at random with a 9mm pistol. Two people died at the scene, and two more died in the hospital. The deceased were between the ages of 30 and 45. Eight others were injured during the attack. There was no conversation or fight that led to the shooting, and no one was robbed. The gunmen fled in a Volkswagen Polo.

On the same day, 15 people were killed in a mass shooting at a tavern in Soweto. However, police do not believe these shootings are linked.

== Investigation ==
6 bullet shells, 1 live round, 16 cartridges, and a 9mm pistol were found at the scene. Forensic experts, members of crime intelligence, and a tactical unit led by the Provincial Organised Crime Investigation Unit were sent to Pietermaritzburg to investigate the shooting.

Between 11 and 12 July 2022, police arrested four suspects, aged between 19 and 36, in connection with the shooting. Two of the suspects were found with an illegally obtained firearm and 17 rounds of ammunition when they were arrested. The two other suspects were released due to a lack of evidence.

== Aftermath ==
Cyril Ramaphosa, the president of South Africa, made a statement about the mass shootings in Pietermaritzburg and Soweto, stating, “As a nation, we cannot allow violent criminals to terrorise us in this way, regardless of where such incidents may occur".

Concerned that taverns were being targeted, the South African Liquor Traders Association also made a statement. Lucky Ntimane, convenor of the SALTA, said "The National Liquor Traders is concerned about the security of its traders and patrons we call on police to investigate fully the circumstances that lead to that tragedy. Taverns should be safe spaces where patrons are able to socialise and enjoy their alcoholic beverages in a safe environment," in regards to the shootings.

The owner of the Samukelisiwe tavern announced that the tavern would be getting armed security. However, the tavern's liquor license was suspended for 3 months because the tavern's security did not meet the license's guidelines.

On 14 July 2022, a memorial service was held at the KwaNxamalala Community Hall for Nkosingiphile Nsele, Mdumiseni Ngidi, Simphiwe Mthembu and Nkosinathi Mdladla, the 4 victims killed in the shooting.

== See also ==
- 2022 Soweto shooting
- Enyobeni Tavern disaster
- Crime in South Africa
