= 1927 Charlestown shootings =

Mass shooting in KwaZulu-Natal, South Africa

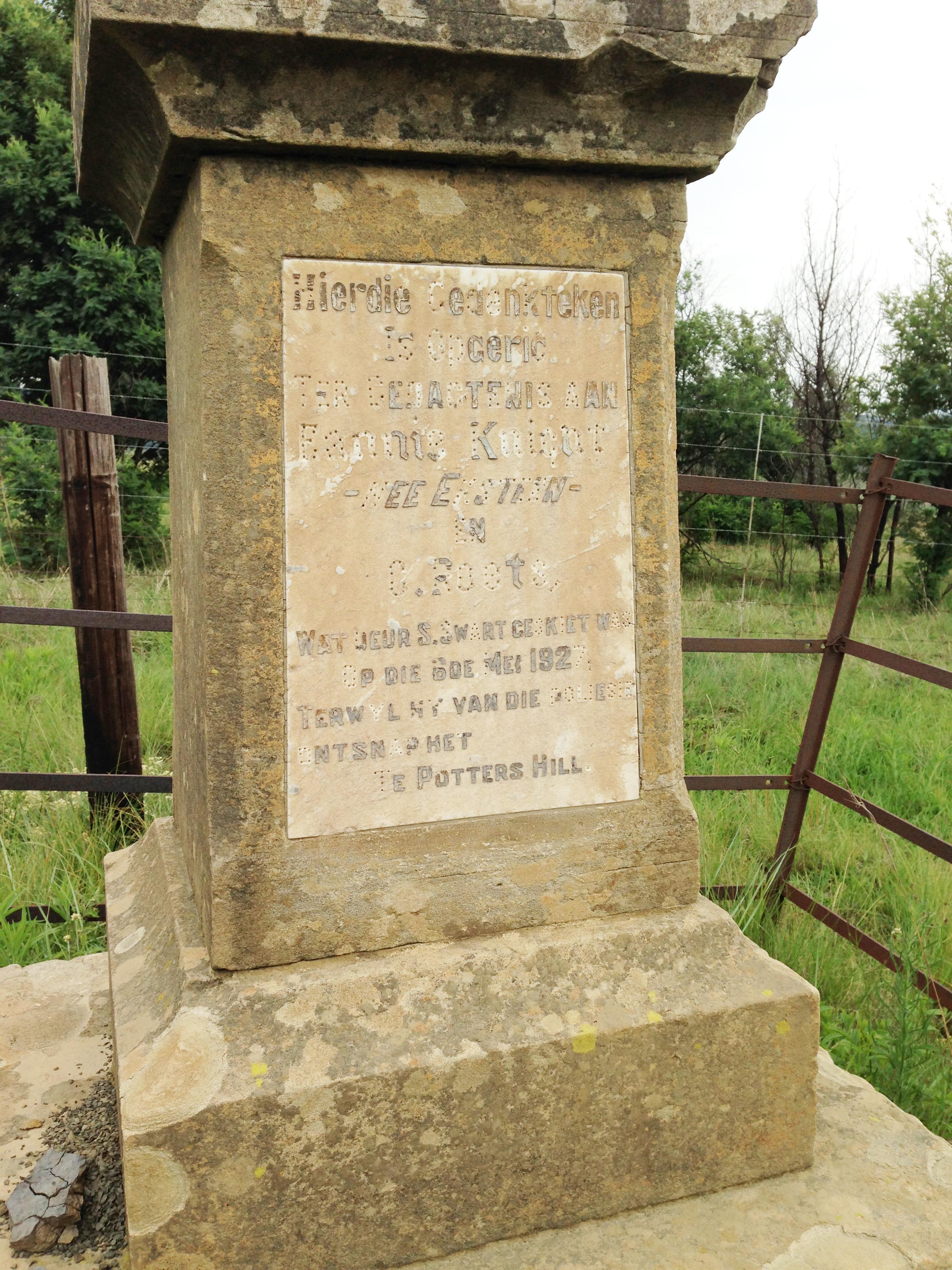
- Inscription of the Fannie Knight Memorial in remembrance of the shootings
- Location: Charlestown, Natal, Union of South Africa
- Date: 6 May 1927
- Target: Police and witnesses in the perpetrator's court cases
- Weapons: Mauser rifle; Browning pistol; Webley Revolver
- Deaths: 9–10 (including the perpetrator)
- Injuries: 3
- Perpetrator: Stephanus Swart

On 6 May 1927, a spree shooting took place around Charlestown, Natal, South Africa. Nine people were killed and three were injured before the perpetrator, 38-year-old Stephanus Swart, killed himself during a manhunt. The fatalities included Swart's wife, his stepdaughter, and five police officers.

The shootings became known as the "Volksrust massacre" (Afrikaans: Bloedbad van Volksrust), the "Swart murders" (Swart-moorde), and the "Pottershill murders" (Pottershill-moorde). The Fannie Knight Memorial, named after Swart's stepdaughter, was built in memory of the victims.

== Incident ==
=== Background ===
On 1 May 1927, S. A. J. Swart, owner of the farm Potter's Hill fourteen miles from Charlestown, was served with a summons on charges of incest with his 14-year-old niece Sarie Alberts. On 3 May, Swart shot at his neighbour J.C. Visser, a witness in the incest case, who managed to escape unharmed and inform police. He then drove to the farm of P. Lourens, where, after failing to find Lourens, he fired a gunshot at farm manager G. Roets, who was not hit. The incident led to a charge of attempted murder. It is believed that the outburst was due to a 10 shilling fine for driving an unlicenced vehicle in April, for which he was also due in court for 4 May.

On 4 May, Swart summoned his lawyer Peter Gerard Maasdorp from Volksrust. Maasdorp was aware of Swart's mental state and contacted police, asking them whether he should delay a meeting with Swart until they had arrested him for the incest charge. Station commander Gerald Ashman instead encouraged him to head over and convince Swart to turn himself in. Maasdorp and his hired driver, B. Plaats, arrived in the afternoon hours. Maasdorp learnt that Swart had not left Potter's Hill for five days, which he mostly spent wandering around the property, having forced the farm workers to do the same. At night, Swart would lock himself inside and await the arrival of police inside with a primed gun. Over the course of the day, Swart engaged in an hours-long "tirade about the injustice of life", speaking well into the night, at which point Swart asked Maasdorp to draw up a final will and testament. The 28-page document also contained a suicide note, again containing the words "blood for blood" and ending with a request for "the news and the prime minister, General Hertzog to get a copy".

Upon being told of Swart's preparations, police sent driver Plaats back to deliver a message to him, again suggesting he should willingly enter custody. Although Swart appeared to have calmed down by the time Plaats returned and read the letter to him, Swart replied that he expected a meeting with Captain Ashman and Maasdorp at the entrance of the farm before tomorrow's dawn, saying that by 6:00 p.m. that day, he planned to block the road and shoot at anyone who entered his property. Before Plaats left, Swart requested a coffin for himself to be made in Volksrust.

Swart failed to appear court in Newcastle on 5 May as accused for incest. An arrest for contempt of court was issued.

=== Shootings ===
In the morning hours of 6 May 1927, a team of twelve policemen led by Captain Gerald Ashman arrived at Potter's Hill. Before entering, a farm labourer warned the officers that Swart was willing to fight. Police were in the process of planning the arrest when Swart, having snuck out of his house with a Mauser rifle and Browning automatic pistol, opened fire on the officers, wounding Constable Feucht. The morning fog obscured the officers' vision in the open field, with Swart hiding behind a stone fence. Feucht was sent back for medical treatment, with Ashman telling his officers to shoot and kill Swart if they spot him. During the search, Swart killed Constables William Mitchell and William Crossman, whom he had shot again while on the ground to ensure their deaths. Sergeant J.A. Grové was mortally wounded. Captain Ashman and Sergeant Van Wyk were killed when Swart ambushed them at the entrance and shot them multiple times. The remaining police officers engaged in a brief shootout with Swart, who took the horse left behind by the labourer earlier and fled the scene on horseback, having taken Ashman's Webley revolver.

At about 8:00 a.m., while riding towards Charlestown, Swart stopped at the house of his neighbour S.J.M. Swanepoel. Swart was visibly in a good mood and after being offered coffee by Swanepoel, he openly boasted about killing five policemen and revealed his plan to kill three more people in Charlestown before committing suicide in Volkrust, showing off the police service reolver as proof. When Swart left, Swanepoel took his own horse to alert authorities in Charlestown.

Meanwhile, Swart encountered his stepdaughter Fannie Knight and his farm manager Cornelis Roets, both of whom had testified against Swart in previous court cases, in a horse cart on the road. Fannie had heard about the shooting of the police officers and worried about her husband's safety, she had convinced Roets to accompany her to Short's Cliff. He forced the carriage to a halt by galloping in front of it and immediately shot both, killing Knight and Roets on the spot. The shooting was witnessed by a black man who lived in a hut 46 metres (50 yd) from the site. Shortly after, as Swanepoel came close to Mount Prospect, he was met with a black man who had been given a note addressed to Swanepoel by Swart, saying that he intended to return and kill Swanepoel anyway if he made it back alive.

According to The Star, after the murders of Knight and Roets, Swart also killed a black man before arriving in Charlestown. This victim was never identified.

Swart arrived at the outskirts of Charlestown at around 9:00 a.m., heading for the Van Vuuren home, where his wife Annie had been living since moving out. Annie had been on the porch with 17-year-old Gertrude van Vuuren and the girl's 21-year-old cousin Lucas when the trio spotted Swart riding in their direction from a distance. A neighbour, Mrs Thomas, had heard news of the shootings at Swart's farm and warned the Van Vuuren residents to hide in a nearby police station. Annie knowingly stayed behind, intending to confront her husband. She was ultimately killed with two gunshots to the forehead and chest. Back on the road, Swart's horse became exhausted, due to which he tied it down to a fence and unsuccessfully attempted to carjack a passing vehicle by shooting at the car, shattering the windshield. The driver, Mr Hadley, and his passenger, Mrs Pulford, were lightly injured, with Hadley's three-year-old nephew remaining unharmed.

Police and farmers eventually found Swart at the road near Swanepoel's farm. A shootout occurred, during which Swart ducked into veld before killing himself by shooting himself in the head with the stolen police revolver.

With the exception of the unidentified man killed outside of Charlestown, all of the killed and injured confirmed victims were of European descent.

Swart was buried in the grounds of the Charlestown police station in a coffin that was reportedly too short for his body.

== Victims ==
=== Killed ===
- Inspector Gerald Collins Ashman, 55
- Constable William Hunter Crossman, 22
- Sergeant Jan Antonie Grové, 29
- Head Constable William Charles Mitchell, 49
- Sergeant Annes Heyn van Wyk, 34
- Anna Catharina "Fannie" Stephanus Knight (née Eksteen), 31
- Cornelis Johannes Erasmus Roets, 20
- Anna Catharina "Annie" Swart (née van Vuuren), 69
- Unidentified African man

=== Injured ===
- William Ferdinand Feucht, 32
- Frank Nixon Hatley
- Margaret Priscilla Pulford (née Hatley)

== Perpetrator ==
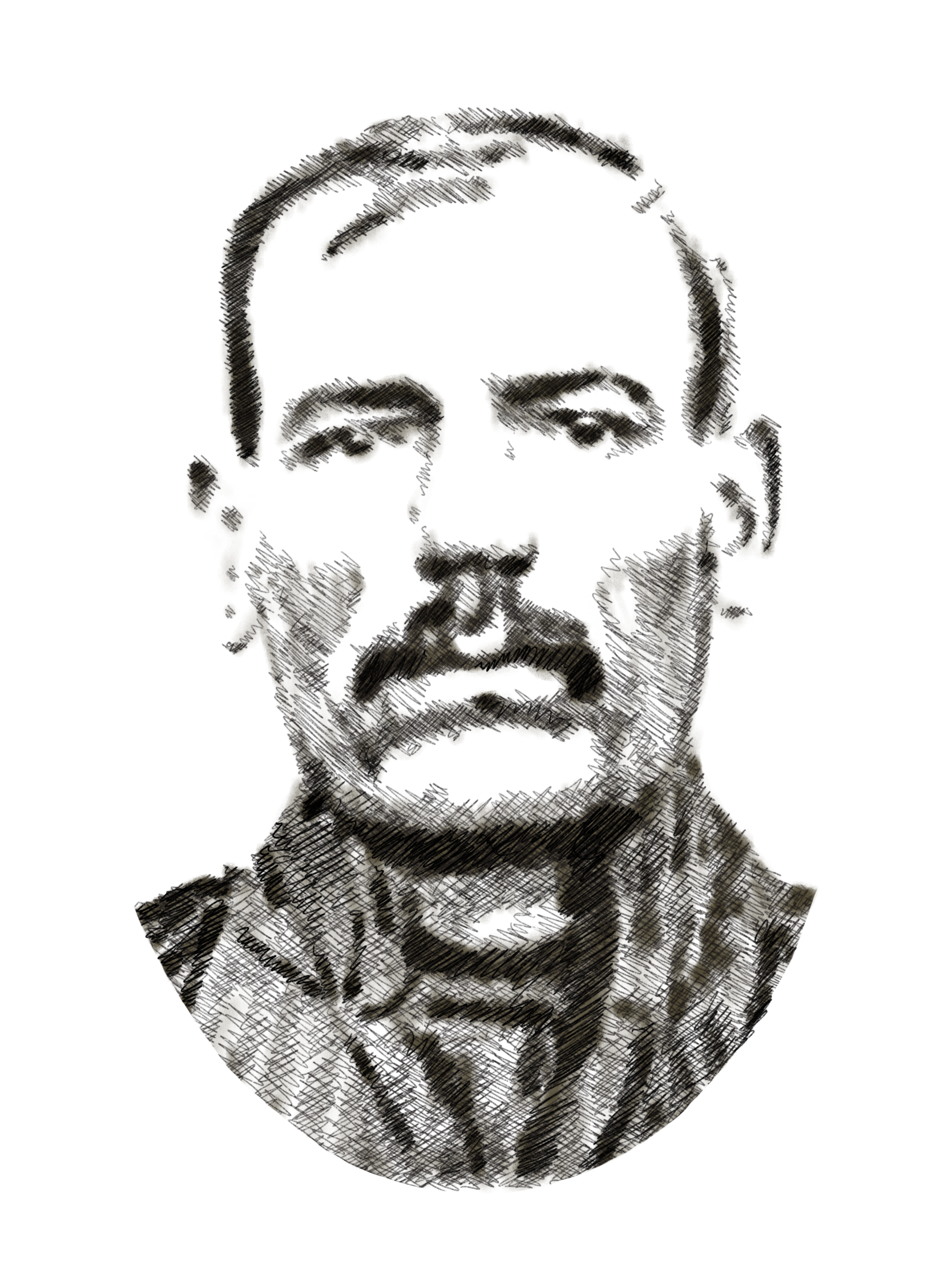
Sketch of an undated photograph of Swart

Stephanus Andries Johannes Swart was born on 21 July 1888 in Ladismith, Cape Colony, as one of seven children to Stephanus Andreas Johannes Swart and Susara Susanna Elizabeth van Tonder. News reports and later retrospectives noted that there was little information on Swart's background. A descendant described the Swart family as impoverished migrant workers who moved frequently to work on farms. His mother died in October 1905 in Laingsburg. Swart was described as having a "domineering nature" since childhood, frequently getting into fights and arguments. He had a long criminal history, having been convicted for the first time at age twenty for stealing sheep and spending "a considerable time" in prison.

=== Marriage to Annie Eksteen ===
Annie Swart was born Anna Catharina van Vuuren was born on 11 July 1857 in Potchefstroom, South African Republic, as one of eight children to Lucas Cornelis Jansen van Vuuren and Catharina Johanna Jansen van der Merwe. Her first husband was the original owner of the Potter's Hill farm, Andries Stephanus Jacobus Marthinus Eksteen, with whom she had four children, though the youngest two died in infancy. Their two surviving daughters wedded local farmers: Aletta Adriana Eksteen, born 1890, married Stephanus Johannes Marthinus "Fane" Swanepoel, owner of La Belle Esperance in Newcastle District, and Anna Catharina "Fannie" Eksteen, born September 1895, who married William Edward James "Willie" Knight, heir of Shorts Cliff near Charlestown. Andries Eksteen died on 21 July 1918, aged 79, leaving his considerable wealth and the Potter's Hill property to Annie.

In 1920, Swart came to Charlestown via the border to Transvaal, with different accounts describe him as entering town in a horse-drawn court with a stallion tied separately or arriving only with six horses to sell. Swart met Annie Eksteen when he sold a horse to her and despite Annie being thirty years older than Swart, the pair married on 1 December 1920 in a lavish ceremony. It is believed that Swart entered the relationship for Annie's farm and money while Annie was likely drawn to Swart's height and physical strength. It was reported that during the wedding, Swart hired a three-car motorcade, each with the Vierkleur flag of the South African Republic, but Swart's new son-in-law, Willie Knight, switched one of the flags for the Union Jack, which caused Swart to hold permanent animosity towards Knight.

With the marriage, Swart gained ownership of Potter's Hill. Within a week of the wedding, Swart began abusing Anna, who called police twice during the first year of their marriage, with one call leading to a conviction against Swart. He also made several court appearances related to physical abuse of his servants. Swart was disliked for his violent behaviour, often being referred to as "the horse thief" as it was widely assumed due to his criminal history that Swart had stolen the horses he had when he first arrived. A previous complaint against Swart accused him of lechery for allegedly having a sexual relation ship with an African woman. He was pejoratively referred to as an "angry man", a "fiend" and "paranoid schizophrenic" by other locals, due to which later retrospective accounts, such as author Rob Marsh, speculated that Swart may have actually had schizophrenia, citing Swart's "extreme mood swings, hostility toward authority, and feelings of persecution". Conflicting accounts existed about Swart's relationship with his farm animals, with several sources claiming that he showed great affection towards them, once threatening to kill a farmhand for kicking one of his dogs, while other reports noted that Swart once tied down a horse and burned it alive for becoming exhausted. Swart was also noted as a "brilliant shootist" and a winger for the North-Eastern Rugby Union of Natal.

Swart's last conviction was for the assault of Shorts Cliff farm owner Willie Knight, the husband of his stepdaughter Fannie Knight, using a horse stirrup. After serving an 18-month sentence, he began sexually abusing his niece, who moved in with him at Potter's Hill. By this point, Anna was still living at Potter's Hill, albeit in judicial separation from Swart. She had been the one to notify police about possible incest between Swart and his niece in early 1927. Swart was released on a £500 bail, but as Anna and one of her farm managers, J.C. Vissler, were willing to testify in court, Swart threatened them with death if they made statements. Both subsequently left the farm, with Anna heading for Potchefstroom. A few days before the murders, Swart had driven there to track his wife down, only to be told that she relocated to Newcastle, where he also did not find her. On his way back to Potter's Hill, Swart decided to burn his car and walk the remaining ten miles on foot, as he did not want the vehicle to "fall into the hands of his enemies".

== Aftermath ==
The funeral of the five police officers was attended by over 2,000. The funeral procession included the body of Gerald Ashman being transported on a gun carriage, behind which Ashman's horse followed with Swart's boots strapped to its saddle's stirrups.

On 11 May 1927, Minister of Justice Tielman Roos held a minute of silence at the Houses of Parliament. The same day, an official inquest took place at the Anglican Church Hall of Charlestown, in part to determine the claim of Constable Feucht that he was shot at by a "native" with a shotgun rather than Swart at Potter's Hill. The inquest presented the rifle and three handguns used by Swart, including the revolver stolen from Captain Ashman, but no shotgun had been recovered.

== Memorials ==
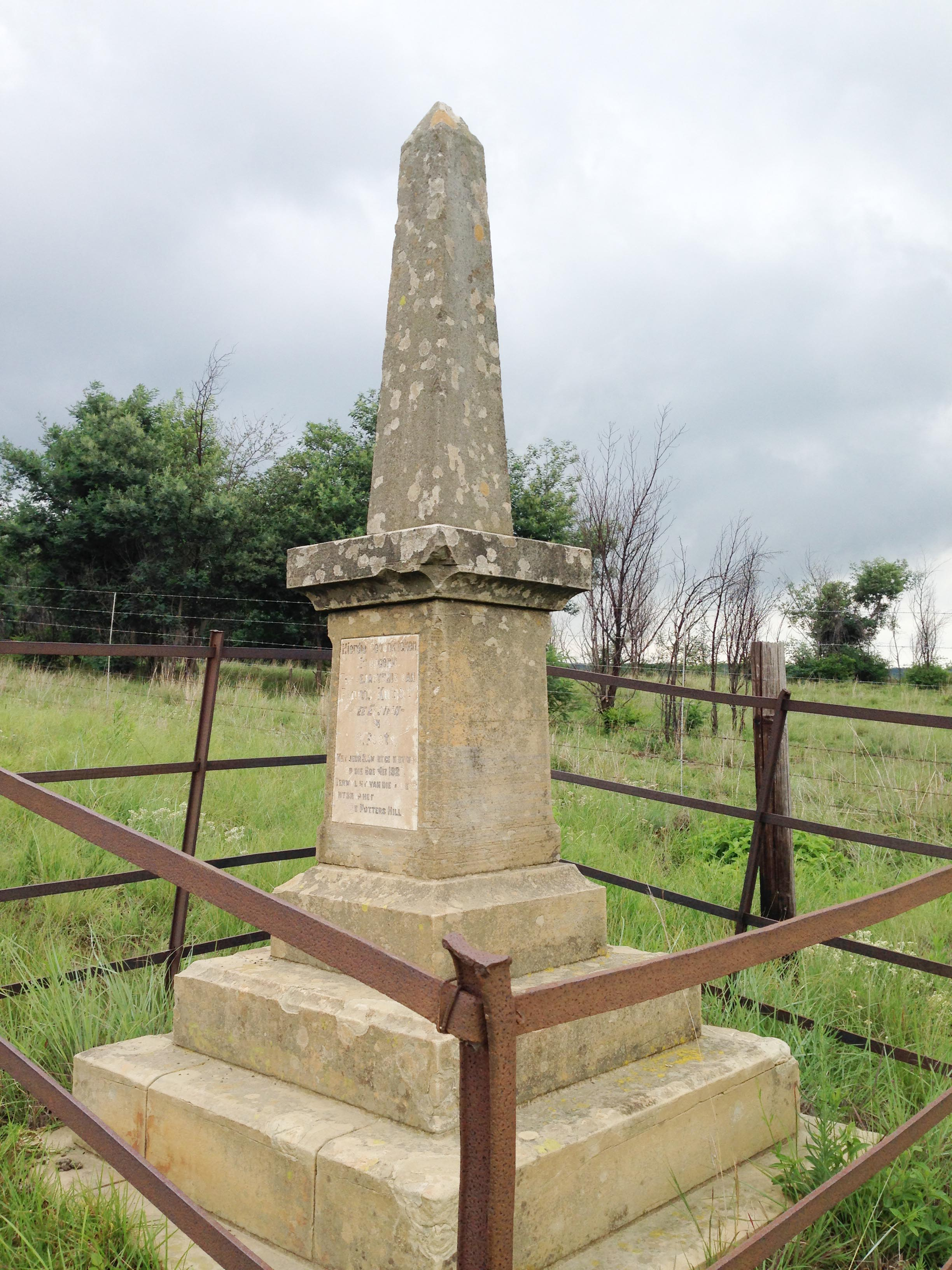
Close up view of the Fannie Knight memorial (at 27°28′48″S 29°49′42″E)

A cenotaph was erected in the Charlestown cemetery for the five policemen.

The Fannie Knight memorial was built at the road between Charlestown and Memel, at the slope of Amajuba Mountain. The inscription reads:

Hierdie Gedenkteken is opgerig ter gedagtenis aan Fannie Knight, nee Eksteen en C. Roets wat deur S. Swart geskiet was op die 6de Mei 1927 terwyl hy aan die Polisie ontsnap het te Potters Hill

[This memorial is erected in memory of Fannie Knight, nee Eksteen and C. Roets who were shot by S. Swart on 6th May 1927 while he was fleeing from the Police at Potters Hill]

== In popular culture ==
A local legend was told by a local African family, who had taken wedding photographs at the structure. According to them, when the groom posed for a photo of himself leaning against the memorial, the resulting photo depicted "a young white woman in an old-fashioned dress" in place of the memorial.

The shooting is incorporated in the historical novel Apartheid: Lives Divided by Bill Duncan. In the fictionalised account, officer A. H. van Wyk, a family friend of the protagonist Duncan family, gave a lift to one of the Duncan sons when the vehicle came under fire in Volksrust by Stephanus Swart, a mentally unstable adulterer. After Swart flees, Van Wyk goes to organise a police response for the next day, telling the Duncan son to take the car and warn his friends at a local tennis party. The Duncans later learn van Wyk was killed by Swart, who then committed suicide.
