= Qibla (group) =

Qibla (Arabic: قبلة) is a militant Shi'a and Sunni Islamist political organization and paramilitary group based in South Africa. The radical group was founded by Ahmed Cassiem in 1979. Ahmed Cassiem was incarcerated on Robben Island by the apartheid regime for much of his adult life. The meaning of Qibla comes from the Quran meaning direction. It is in the direction of Mecca that multiple times a day Muslims pray towards.

The group was seeking to remove apartheid along with all of the other organisations which were dedicated to the fight against apartheid. The organisation has members of both Sunni and Shia persuasion. The group was also founded in order to advance Islam in South Africa, and according to Joshua Lefkowitz has been "labeled a terrorist organization" by the U.S. State Department.

== Organization ==
When Qibla was established in 1979 in South Africa, it was during a time of turmoil. The apartheid regime had control of the government and Islam continued to be a suppressed religion. Muslims first came to South Africa in 1658, and most had come as slaves. By the 1970s and 1980s, some Muslims began to act in an effort to establish socio-political justice. Qibla was not the only movement that was formed, along with the Muslim Students Association (MSA), the Muslim Youth Movement (MYM), and the Call of Islam (COI).

The government in South Africa, which associated itself with Iran, disregarded the growth of Islamicist groups in the country. In addition, Al-Qaeda had also taken a stronghold in South Africa. Qibla's leader, Cassiem was also seen as a radical by the United States government. They believed that Qibla was formed in an effort to create an Islamic state based on the Iranian revolution. They thought that Qibla's members were being trained militarily in Libya as well.

Qibla was originally established in an effort to combat the apartheid government and it was a socio-political movement. Qibla also had very strong religious ties and this is how some members became part of it. Cassiem and another individual named Sa’dullah Khan conducted Qur’an classes. They would at first not discuss the movement, but the classes were for individuals to find a deeper meaning in their Islamic religion. Many felt a connection with the analysis of the Qur’an that Cassiem and Khan provided and inspired individuals to want to be directly involved politically and socially. These classes also drew women in as well. Women were inspired to be involved because they felt a need as Muslim women to make a difference in what they believed in because they are often pushed to the side. Women were an important part of the group and are often disregarded for being involved with Islamicist groups. The classes allowed Qibla to establish a significant space that became a ritualistic practice utilized by the group to create unity. This allowed them to use religion as a source of motivation and as deeper meaning for individuals to want to fight for their cause. It brought in individuals who had a religious background and wanted to be a part of a cause they cared about, and Qibla and its leaders further strengthened that religious quality to inspire them. Some members do not see the group as an extremist group.

The significance of the name Qibla is not only because it is the direction of prayer for Muslims, but it is a deeper and religious direction for individuals in the group. A direction to follow to fight for the cause.

The organisation also has two affiliated sister organisations working on charity and education respectively. Mustadhafin Foundation is reported to be the first relief agency to respond in areas affected by a 1990s typhoon in Cape Town. This Qibla-affiliated organisation is currently still offering support and relief services to various disenfranchised communities in South Africa. The other affiliated organisation known as Iqraa Foundation, is an education based agency also working among disenfranchised communities.

== Leadership ==
Qibla was founded by Imam Ahmed Cassiem. Cassiem was born on 12 December 1945 in South Africa and was raised Muslim. He began fighting against the apartheid regime when he was 15 years old. Then, when he was 17, he and his teacher were detained by the 90 Day detention law because they thought his teacher was making explosives. Not long after, they were arrested and brought to Robben Island because they were charged with violating the Sabotage Act. Cassiem was one of the youngest individuals to be imprisoned there and was under a 5-year sentence. After getting out of prison, he was under strict release conditions, but nonetheless, he founded Qibla in 1979. In 1980, he was arrested again and then detained for 243 days for trying to bring students and teachers into the movement against apartheid education. Then in 1981, he was again arrested under the Terrorism Act. He was thought to be involved in an event in the Athens Airport. There were ten people coming from Libya after undergoing military training, and they found his phone number in one of these member's phones. Cassiem went on trial in 1987-1988 and was sentenced to six years in prison, so until 1991 and was under strict conditions for two years.

Cassiem is also the national Secretary General of the Pan Africanist Congress in the Western Cape Province in 2005, and he is an advisor on the Islamic Human Rights Commission. In addition, he is also the National Chairperson on the Islamic Unity Convention (South Africa) since 1995. The IUC encompasses around 250 Muslim groups in the country. They have supported terrorists and it is hypothesized that the IUC is connected to Qibla. In 1993, Cassiem and the IUC sent a letter to President Clinton which wrote to ask for Shaikh Omar Abdel-Rahman to be let out of prison. The IUC also has a radio station in Cape Town called the Radio 786 and actively supports Cassiem. The government in South Africa was not active in trying to deal with the rise of these extremist groups.

Cassiem was also motivated to start Qibla because of his analysis of the Qur’an and Islam. The Qur’an signifies that being a member of a persecuted group, in his case being a Muslim, they should fight to change this. In this context, against the apartheid regime. Cassiem stated that, "What we are emphasising is that ideology, and especially the ideology of Islam, encourages and creates social consciousness, identity, solidarity and inspires positive action on a scale no other ideology has done or can do." Leadership is very important to the organization and Cassiem provided individuals that motivation to act on their urge to be a part of something and to empower them.
