= 2008 Skierlik shooting =

Mass shooting in South Africa

- Skierlik (North West (South African province)) Skierlik (South Africa)
- Location: 25.6308°S 26.9672°E; Skierlik, North West, South Africa
- Date: 14 January 2008
- Target: Black people
- Attack type: Mass shooting
- Weapon: .303 BSA bolt-action rifle
- Deaths: 4
- Injuries: 8
- Perpetrator: Johan Nel
- Motive: Racism, possibly revenge for farm attacks
- Convictions: Four counts of murder; 11 counts of attempted murder; One charge each of possession of an unlicensed firearm, and possessing ammunition

On 14 January 2008, a mass shooting took place in Skierlik, an informal settlement in North West, South Africa. Four people, including a 3-month-old baby, were killed and eight others were injured in a racially motivated attack targeting black people. The perpetrator 18-year-old Johan Nel, shouted racial expletives during the shooting and was eventually arrested after attempting to seek refuge at a nearby farm.

Nel believed that white people were "under attack"; he was noted to have an interest in farm attacks. At the time of the shooting, he was awaiting sentencing for a 2003 shooting of a man; the sentencing had been delayed since he was a minor. The attack received much press interest and fueled the debate on reconciliation in South Africa. Following the attack, in November 2008, he was sentenced to 4 life sentences and 68 years in prison.

== Background ==
Skierlik (sometimes incorrectly spelled Skielik) is an informal settlement and squatter camp, or slum, near Swartruggens in the Kgetleng Local Municipality in North West, South Africa. Such slums are common in South Africa due to historical distribution of land being unequal between races. Farming areas in Swartruggens and neighboring areas are overwhelmingly white.

=== Perpetrator ===
Jozef Johannes "Johan" Nel, an 18-year-old Afrikaner, was the perpetrator of the shooting. According to his lawyer, Nel never learned to socialize, particularly with black people. Nel's older brother was attacked at their farmhouse in 2001 at the age of 15 while the rest of his family was at church. His brother chased off the robbers with a revolver, but the robbers told his brother they would return and kill everyone in the family, and then attack another farm in the area. According to his mother, this traumatized the then 11-year-old Nel. On 17 July 2003, at the age of 13, Nel shot a man while cutting grass at the farm. Family and friends claimed the shooting was in self-defense, and that he had been attacked by the man with a sickle. Nel was convicted of recklessly discharging a firearm. The sentencing for that case had been provisionally suspended until 2008, as Nel was a minor at the time. After the shooting, his mother expressed regret she did not get him counseling, as he was "already hysterical" after his first arrest and the attack on his brother.

A family friend of Nel claimed that he had a "definite interest" in farm attacks, which depressed him. Nel believed white people were "under attack". Nel and his brother were members of the local gun club for recreational purposes. The week before the shooting, his girlfriend broke up with him, saying that she thought he was "boring and uninteresting". The day before the shooting, Nel visited with his family friends, who had recently suffered a gas attack and robbery on their farm. Upon hearing this and seeing another farm attack mentioned on the news, Nel became physically ill and visibly distressed, and left the room.

== Shooting ==
On 14 January 2008, Nel, in his father's Toyota, drove to the Skierlik settlement and parked next to the main road. He then walked to Skierlik and opened fire with a .303 BSA bolt-action rifle, shooting anyone he saw, walking down a dirt road. He was wearing camouflage fatigues and carrying 125 rounds of ammunition. Nel shouted racist abuse while shooting, repeatedly yelling "kaffirs" (a slur for black people), and shouting in Afrikaans: "Come out, you kaffirs. I want to kill you, you black assholes." Residents went for cover and tried to flee.

After firing more than 100 rounds Nel requested additional ammunition from a local farmer. After the farmer refused, Nel shot his ostrich. He then approached two other farmers and discussed with them what he had done. Nel was arrested some time afterwards after attempting to seek shelter at a nearby farm, when the owner took him to the local police station and he turned himself in.

=== Victims ===
Four people were killed and eight were injured, three critically. Three others were shot at, and about 100 shots were fired in total. The dead included a 3-month-old baby. Another victim was a 10-year-old grade five student. All of the victims were black.

== Aftermath ==
The shooting, and particularly its social consequences, dominated the headlines for several months after the shooting, fueling tensions in the discussion on South African race relations. The white people living in Swartruggens were blamed for the attack, viewed in the aftermath as resisting the attempts to reconcile. The town itself was subject to national media attention after the attack. Nel was sent to Weskoppies Psychiatric Hospital to be assessed where he spent a month. After the shooting, protests broke out involving thousands of people. During these protests the controversial "Kill the Boer" slogan was chanted. One local resident said in response: "Comrades, there is no killing of the farmer and no killing of the boer. We kill the killer." Riot police were called to control the crowd, after they broke down the main gate to the courthouse. A memorial service for the victims was held in the week after the shooting, which over 600 mourners and others attended.

Vuyisile Mpofu, a retired policeman who had worked with Nel's father, said Nel had previously treated black people with respect and said his family were not racist. Townspeople described his family as "‘God-fearing' ordinary people, with no known right-wing connections or inclinations". A family friend of the Nels expressed distress over the racial polarization in the town after the shooting, saying "What the suspect did was wrong, just as farm murders are wrong, but the racial divisions that are now being fired by politicians, are very dangerous". Wilhelm Rocher, the security chairperson of the Transvaal Agricultural Union, described Nel as a "ticking timb bomb", saying the shooting was "an alarm clock that has gone off that warns us that our youth are being exposed to horrific scenarios as a result of crime."

AfriForum condemned the incident and sent condolences to the families of the victims. Kallie Kriel of AfriForum disputed that it was purely racially motivated, saying "It is unfortunate that the people are being incited by race. There should be no double standards. Politicians did not react when Frans Pieterse was killed by a black man in Swartruggens. We condemn all murders strongly"; he lodged a complaint with the human rights commission that hate speech increased racial tensions. AfriForum reframed the event as being outside of the rural history of racism in the country. The Democratic Alliance in the North West said it "regretted the killings", and a DA counsellor in the area stated "We feel very, very sorry about this", and that the community, whether white or black, should "accept the decisions of the court." In the wake of the shooting, Skierlik's occupants were relocated to nearby Mazista and provided with housing.

=== Legal proceedings ===
The case was moved to high court due to the severity of the charges. The court only spoke in Afrikaans, when they were meant to speak in two languages so more people could understand in court, leading the relatives of some of the victims to say the proceedings were racially biased. Nel's father was charged for negligent handling of a firearm, as his gun, used in the shooting, was not locked in a safe as required by law. During the court proceedings Nel gave photographers thumbs up and grinned at the relatives of the victims.

The judge presiding over the case, Ronald Hendricks, commented that racism could not be tolerated. The judge received death threats during the hearings, resulting in a legal investigation being opened over intimidation, and said racism cannot be tolerated. The court refused to hear of any "compelling circumstances" relating to the crime. Nel was declared mentally competent. Nel claimed he could not remember committing the shooting, and admitted "it was wrong to kill".

Nel was declared mentally fit to stand trial 14 April. He faced four charges of murder, 11 of attempted murder, and one charge each of possession of an unlicensed firearm, damaging property, and possessing ammunition. The charge of property damage (relating to the ostrich) was dropped. He pleaded guilty to all charges 17 November 2008. Nel was sentenced to 4 life terms and 68 years in prison; a life term for each of the four murder counts, and seven years for each of eight attempted murder charges, in addition to five years for possession of a firearm and three for ammunition. He showed no emotion as he was sentenced, with Hendricks saying that he had not shown genuine remorse. The Young Communist League "welcomed the sentence".

== Legacy ==
After the shooting, the location of the shooting became often referred to as just "Johan Nel". In 2012, Nel's family said they would visit Skierlik in an attempt at reconciliation. In 2013, five years after the shooting, the local government held a commemoration week in Swartruggens as well as Koster and Derby, beginning 14 January. An Anti-Racism Summit was held at Swartruggens Hoërskool; the week began with visits to the gravesites of the victims and several community performances. The event was to encourage reconciliation, with the mayor noting it was initially difficult to get the white people in the area to attend. The victims' families received government funding.

One of the survivors of the shooting, Alex Ndlovu, said that he could not forgive, saying that: "I was shot and could have easily been killed. A three-month-old baby and her mother were killed, and for what? I find it very difficult to forgive someone who went out to kill us for no reason at all." The victims and survivors of the shooting refused to attend a memorial service held in their honor in 2014, saying the municipality had short-charged them after the shooting. The President of South Africa, Cyril Ramaphosa, discussed the shooting in 2022, saying: "The hurt of what took place in Skierlik, here 14 years ago, still cuts deep. It still hurts. People still remember, people still have it embedded in their memory. It was a stark reminder to us all that racism did not die when apartheid fell."

Nel got married while in prison in 2012. One of the relatives of the victims wished their marriage well, while another was upset that Nel was allowed such freedom in prison, saying a black person in a similar situation would not have been afforded the same rights. A theatre play, titled Skierlik, was made based on the shooting. It won the Best Production award at the Baxter Theatre's Zabalaza Festival in 2013.

== See also ==
- 1999 Tempe military base shooting, racially motivated shooting against white people
- Strijdom Square massacre
