= Strijdom Square massacre =

1988 mass shooting in South Africa

- Strijdom Square (Gauteng) Strijdom Square (South Africa)
- Location: 25.7464°S 28.1935°E; Strijdom Square, Pretoria, Gauteng, South Africa
- Date: 15 November 1988
- Attack type: Mass shooting
- Weapon: 9mm Vektor Z88 pistol
- Deaths: 8
- Injuries: 16
- Perpetrator: Barend Strydom
- Defender: Simon Mukondoleli
- Motive: White supremacy
- Convictions: Murder; Attempted murder

On 15 November 1988, white supremacist Barend Strydom carried out a shooting spree at Strijdom Square in central Pretoria, South Africa, killing eight people and injuring 16 others. Seven of the victims were black, while one was Indian. Strydom was later convicted and sentenced to death for the attack, but was released from prison as a political prisoner by F. W. de Klerk in 1992, and amnestied by the Truth and Reconciliation Commission in 1994.

== Background ==
Located in the center of Pretoria, what later became Strijdom Square was initially known as the Market Square. The location hosted several important marketplaces and acted as a center of economic activity. As a result, the square became an important location in Pretoria. In the 1970s, a monument was erected in the square to commemorate South African prime minister J. G. Strijdom, known for his support of racial segregation and his baaskap policy. The square contained a large statue of Strijdom's disembodied head, which was considered its signature feature. The Delmas Treason Trial was ongoing in Pretoria at the time.

=== Perpetrator ===
Barend Hendrik Strydom was born in Weenen, Natal, South Africa, in 1965. Strydom's mother killed herself at the age of 23, when he was 18 months old. At the time of the suicide, she was alone with Strydom, who was found with blue strangulation marks on his neck. Strydom was told she died in a revolver accident, which he believed until after the shooting. He had been a member of extremist right wing organizations since the age of 16, and was encouraged in his views by his father. Strydom viewed black people as animals. He joined the South African Police, but was dismissed after photographing himself holding a knife and the severed head of a black motorist at the scene of an automobile accident.

A week prior to the shooting, on 8 November 1988, he had gone to a black squatter camp and shot and killed a black woman, injuring another, in what he called a "practice run" for the shooting. After the attack, Strydom claimed he was a member of a group called the White Wolves (Afrikaans: Wit Wolwe), but this was later dismissed as a fictitious organization invented by Strydom. Other sources claimed the Wit Wolwe were a real group, which had started in the 1970s. Strydom also said that he had meditated and prayed a number of days before the attack and said that God had not given him any sign not to carry out the attack.

== Shooting ==
On 15 November 1988 Strydom, age 23, dressed in camouflage with a belt inscribed with the words "Wit Wolwe" and carrying a 9mm Vektor pistol, two magazines, and 200 loose bullets, travelled to central Pretoria. At about 3 p.m., Strydom parked his car on Prinsloo Street and walked to Strijdom Square, chosen as a location due to its namesake. Once at the square he opened fire at random at any black person he saw. He shot one man outside the State Theatre, before crossing Church Street and headed back towards Prinsloo street. On the corner of Church Street and Prinsloo street he shot an additional two people.

He walked three more blocks, shooting people all the while, before turning down Struben Street and entering the Sato Engineering building. Once inside he walked over to a counter and began to reload his gun. The shooting ended when a black taxi driver, Simon Mukondoleli, followed him into Sato Engineering, and tapped Strydom on the shoulder. Once Strydom turned around, Mukondoleli grabbed Strydom's pistol from the counter and pointed it at him. Strydom raised his hands and said "You've got me." Both men then walked back out into the street, where Strydom was then arrested by several policemen.

Strydom smiled throughout the shooting. Eight people were killed and 16 were injured in the aftermath. (Note: Counting the woman who died in the prior attack, the count would be nine. One of the victims in the square shooting died due to his injuries five years later.) One of the wounded victims was paralyzed from the waist down. Seven of the victims were black, while one was Indian.

== Aftermath ==
After his arrest, Strydom said he felt nothing for the victims. He claimed he committed the shooting because he wanted to start a race war and that his actions were necessary for the survival of his people. He told the police he was sorry he had not killed more.

=== Legal proceedings ===
Strydom made jokes and laughed in court, joking that he shot one of his victims because she "used up oxygen". During the proceedings, two psychologists and a psychiatrist testified that Strydom was "eccentric but not insane" and knew what he was doing. Strydom showed no remorse for his actions during the proceedings and claimed that he acted according to the will of God. When asked how an elderly woman could threaten him, he stated "She threatened my existence because she was black and because she was alive".

His legal defense was that he had committed justifiable homicide. During his trial Strydom became a "cult figure" to the extreme right wing in South Africa. On 25 May 1989, Strydom was sentenced to 30 years for attempted murder and was sentenced to death on the murder charges, to be carried out by hanging. The presiding judge stated Strydom's actions were "worse than those of terrorists", as he had laughed in the faces of his victims while shooting them instead of leaving bombs. Strydom's defense attorney stated he would appeal his sentence.

In 1990, the government declared a moratorium on capital punishment. In 1992, he was released from prison by President F. W. de Klerk as one of 150 political prisoners, part of an attempt to reduce white South African criticism of de Klerk's concessions to the ANC. On the day Strydom was released, 29 September 1992, unknown persons poured a large quantity of red dye into the Strijdom Square fountain. At the time it was unknown if the action was done by people in support of or against Strydom's actions though responsibility was later taken by artist Jacques Coetzer.

He was then granted amnesty in 1994 by the Truth and Reconciliation Commission on the grounds that his attack was politically motivated. The ANC condemned the release of Strydom. His release was controversial, as was that of Robert McBride, a black man who had killed whites. Strydom stated after his release that he would do it again "if necessary". De Klerk stated he viewed the crimes of both McBride and Strydom as "atrocious", but that their release was to help black-white political negotiations move forward.

=== Legacy ===
Simon Mukondoleli was later killed in an attack in 1991, possibly related to his work as a private investigator.

On the 30th anniversary of the attack, on 15 November 2018, the names of the victims were read aloud in a ceremony. A commemorative plaque was dedicated in the square, created by Bradley Steyn, who had witnessed the massacre as a teenager. The ceremony was attended by Carl Niehaus, a spokesperson for the UMkhonto we Sizwe Military Veterans' Association, and two family members of the victims.

The square itself was later renamed Lillian Ngoyi Square, after South African anti-apartheid activist Lilian Ngoyi.

Strydom was investigated for his support and leadership in right wing extremist causes in 2003, after his release. This came after he showed support for De Wet Kritzinger, who shot and killed 3 black people on a bus. After Kritzinger was sentenced, Strydom read out a statement of support for him, and described him as a prisoner of war. Kritzinger had previously expressed support for the Wit Wolwe, Strydom's nonexistent far right group.

In 2008, Strydom testified at the Boeremag trial, after he was called to the stand to defend Adriaan van Wy. He stated during his testimony that he still believed black people were not human. The head prosecutor in that case was the same official who had sentenced Strydom to death.

== See also ==
- 1999 Tempe military base shooting
- 2008 Skierlik shooting
- 1992 Ladysmith shooting
