= Charlestown, South Africa =

Populated place in KwaZulu-Natal, South Africa

Charlestown
- Location within KwaZulu-Natal Location within South Africa
- Coordinates: 27°25′S 29°53′E
- Country: South Africa
- Province: KwaZulu-Natal
- District: Amajuba
- Municipality: Newcastle
- Established: 1889

Area
  - Total: 21.99 km^{2} (8.49 sq mi)
- Elevation: 1,649 m (5,410 ft)

Population (2011)
  - Total: 4,392
  - Density: 199.7/km^{2} (517.3/sq mi)

Racial makeup (2011)
  - Black African: 99.2%
  - Coloured: 0.4%
  - Indian/Asian: 0.1%
  - White: 0.2%

First languages (2011)
  - Zulu: 94.4%
  - English: 1.4%
  - S. Ndebele: 1.0%
  - Other: 3.1%
- Time zone: UTC+2 (SAST)

Charlestown is a small town situated at the top of Laing's Nek pass in KwaZulu-Natal, South Africa between Newcastle and Volksrust. It started out as an important railway station and customs post between Natal and Transvaal in 1891 until the Union of South Africa came into being in 1910, and customs tariffs were abolished. It is named after Sir Charles Mitchell, governor of Natal.

It became a dormitory suburb of Volksrust, just across the border in the Transvaal, and many black people bought freehold land in the town. During the 1960s, however, the apartheid policy of the government led to most of the black inhabitants being forcibly removed to Madadeni, near Newcastle, and Charlestown became a ghost town.

In 1927, a shooting took place on the outskirts of town in one of South Africa's first mass shooting instances.
