= 2022 Soweto shooting =

Mass shooting in Soweto, South Africa

2022 Soweto shootings
- Soweto (South Africa)
- Location: Orlando, Soweto, Gauteng, South Africa
- Date: 9 July 2022
- Attack type: Mass shooting
- Weapons: Rifles, 9mm pistols
- Deaths: 16
- Injuries: 7
- Perpetrator: Unknown

On 9 July 2022, a mass shooting took place at a tavern in Orlando, Soweto, Gauteng, South Africa. 16 people were killed in the incident.

At about 21:00 GMT, a group of men armed with rifles and a 9mm pistol opened fire on patrons in the tavern. A total of 23 people were shot. 12 people were killed at the scene and 3 others later died in the hospital. A fourth injured victim died at the hospital on 12 July, bringing the death toll to 16. The perpetrators fled the scene in a white minibus taxi and have not been apprehended. The police arrived at 04:00 GMT on 10 July 2022, and the injured victims were sent to the Chris Hani Baragwanath Hospital.

The shooting occurred on the same day as another mass shooting in a tavern in Pietermaritzburg, KwaZulu-Natal, though authorities do not believe the incidents are linked.
