= List of members of the 4th Gauteng Provincial Legislature =

4th Gauteng Provincial Legislature
←	3rd Legislature	5th Legislature	→
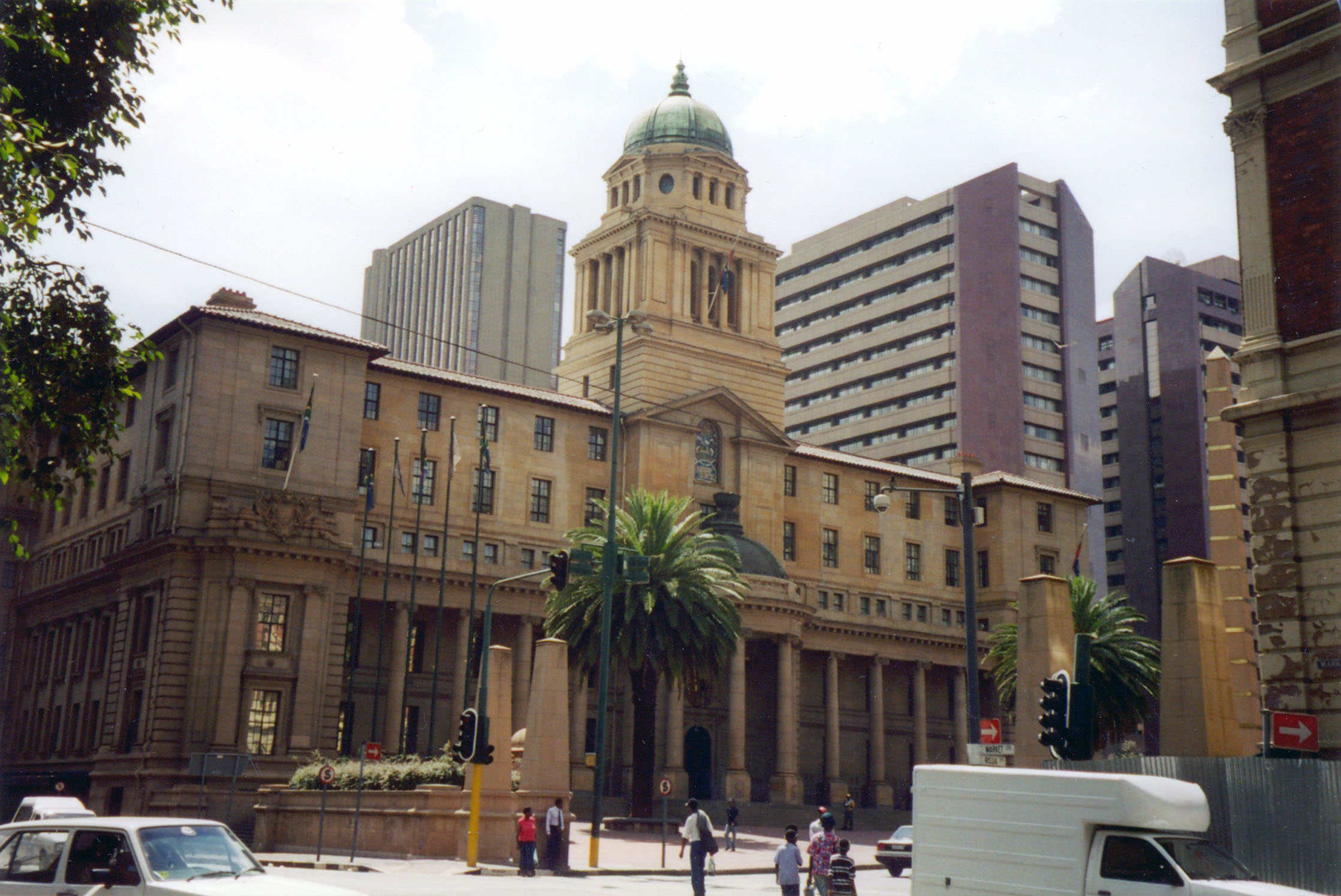
- Johannesburg City Hall

Overview
- Legislative body: Gauteng Provincial Legislature
- Jurisdiction: Gauteng, South Africa
- Meeting place: Johannesburg City Hall
- Term: 6 May 2009 – May 2014
- Election: 22 April 2009
- Members: 73
- Speaker: Lindiwe Maseko
- Deputy Speaker: Steward Ngwenya (2009–2012); Uhuru Moiloa (2012–2014)
- Premier: Nomvula Mokonyane
- Party control: African National Congress

This is a list of members of the fourth Gauteng Provincial Legislature as elected in the election of 22 April 2009. In that election, the African National Congress (ANC) retained its majority in the legislature, winning 47 of 73 seats. The Democratic Alliance (DA) served as the official opposition with 16 seats, and five other parties – the Congress of the People (COPE), the Freedom Front Plus (FF+), the Inkatha Freedom Party (IFP), the African Christian Democratic Party (ACDP), and the Independent Democrats (ID) – were also represented.

During its first sitting on 6 May 2009, the legislature elected Nomvula Mokonyane as the fifth Premier of Gauteng. It also elected Lindiwe Maseko to serve as the province's first female Speaker. Maseko was deputised by Steward Ngwenya and, from August 2012, by Uhuru Moiloa.

== Composition ==
Party	Seats
African National Congress	47
DA	16
Congress of the People	6
VF+	1
Inkatha Freedom Party	1
African Christian Democratic Party	1
Independent Democrats	1
Total	73

== Members ==
This is a list of members of the fourth legislature as elected in April 2009. The list does not take into account changes in membership after the election.

Name	Party
Kenneth Batyi	ANC
Joachim Boers	ANC
Molebatsi Bopape	ANC
Firoz Cachalia	ANC
Mamonare Chueu	ANC
Barbara Creecy	ANC
Brian Hlongwa	ANC
Ignatius Jacobs	ANC
Jacob Khawe	ANC
Nkosiphendule Kolisile	ANC
Lindiwe Lasindwa	ANC
Kgaogelo Lekgoro	ANC
Refilwe Sophia Letwaba	ANC
Peace Mabe	ANC
Michael Madlala	ANC
Errol Magerman	ANC
Qedani Mahlangu	ANC
Lebogang Maile	ANC
Sizakele Malobane	ANC
Lindiwe Maseko	ANC
Paul Mashatile	ANC
Faith Mazibuko	ANC
Valentine Mbatha	ANC
Nompi Letiah Mtambo	ANC
Mafika Mgcina	ANC
Jacqueline Mofokeng	ANC
Refilwe Mogale	ANC
Uhuru Moiloa	ANC
Nomvula Mokonyane	ANC
Khabisi Mosunkuntu	ANC
Samson Bengeza Mthombeni	ANC
Nelisiwe Mtimkulu	ANC
Claudia Ndaba	ANC
Refiloe Ndzuta	ANC
Steward Ngwenya	ANC
Thuliswa Nkabinde	ANC
Mandla Nkomfe	ANC
Bekizwe Nkosi	ANC
Hope Papo	ANC
Joyce Pekane	ANC
Nomantu Ralehoko	ANC
Anthony Selepe	ANC
Doreen Senokoanyane	ANC
Nokuthula Sikakane	ANC
Godfrey Tsotetsi	ANC
Sophia Williams-De Bruyn	ANC
Eric Xayiya	ANC
Beverley Abrahams	DA
Jack Bloom	DA
Neil Campbell	DA
Hendrika Kruger	DA
Les Labuschagne	DA
Gavin Lewis	DA
Katherine Lorimer	DA
Patricia Mokgohlwa	DA
John Moodey	DA
Michael Moriarty	DA
Fred Nel	DA
Chabeli Nkhi	DA
Nkhumeni Ramulifho	DA
Glenda Steyn	DA
Thomas Walters	DA
Paul Willemburg	DA
Mlungisi Hlongwane	COPE
Lawrence Khoza	COPE
Sikelelwa Clara Motau	COPE
John Ngcebetsha	COPE
Lyndall Shope-Mafole	COPE
Tersia Wessels	COPE
Lydia Meshoe	ACDP
Jaco Mulder	FF+
Rose Gudlhuza	ID
Petros Sithole	IFP
