= List of members of the 3rd Gauteng Provincial Legislature =

3rd Gauteng Provincial Legislature
| ← | 2nd Legislature | 4th Legislature | → |
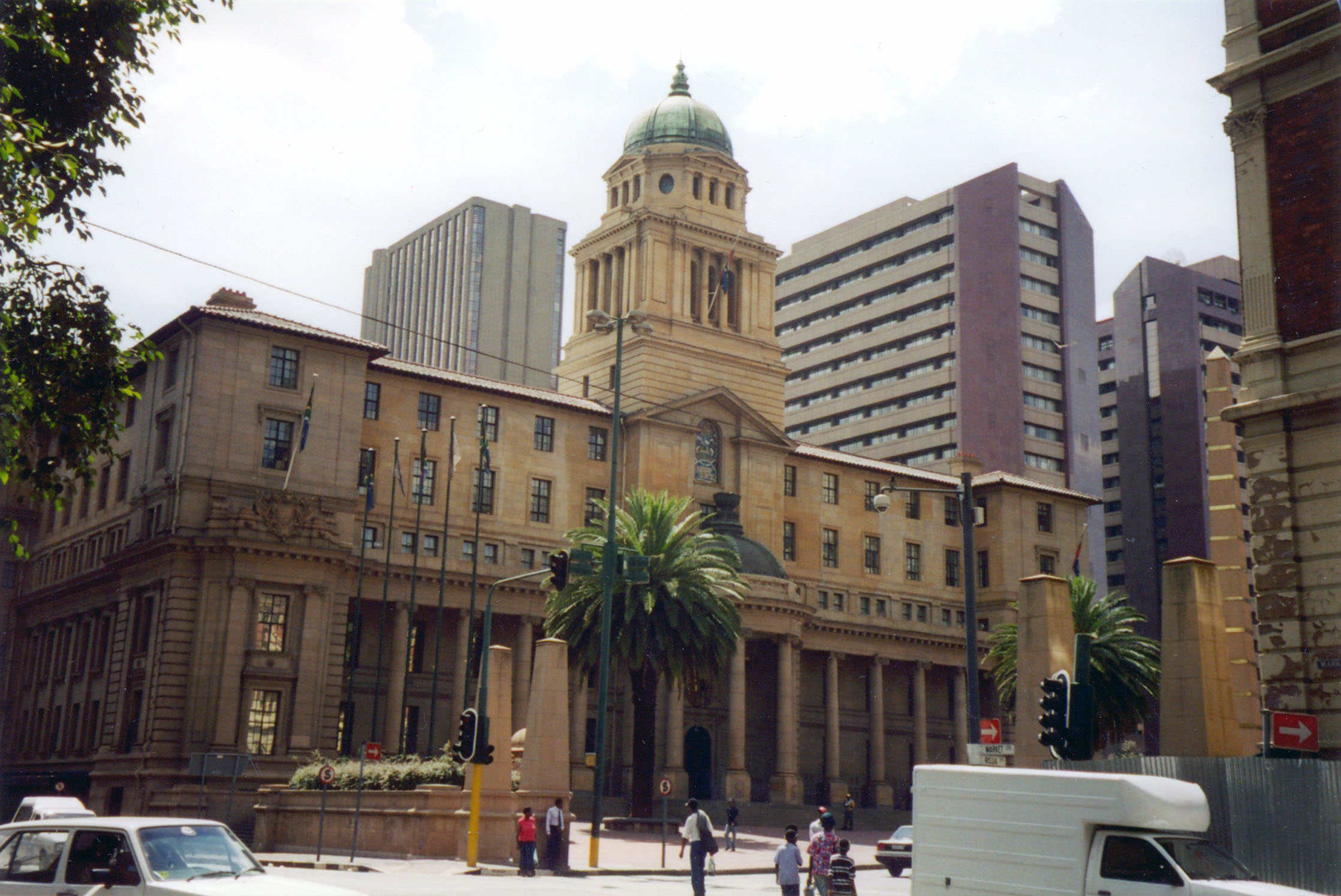
- Johannesburg City Hall

Overview
- Legislative body: Gauteng Provincial Legislature
- Jurisdiction: Gauteng, South Africa
- Meeting place: Johannesburg City Hall
- Term: 26 April 2004 – April 2009
- Election: 14 April 2004
- Members: 73
- Speaker: Richard Mdakane
- Deputy Speaker: Mary Metcalfe (2004–5); Sophia Williams-De Bruyn (2005–9)
- Premier: Mbhazima Shilowa (2004–8); Paul Mashatile (2008–9)
- Party control: African National Congress

The third Gauteng Provincial Legislature was elected in the election of 14 April 2004. In that election, the African National Congress (ANC) retained its majority in the legislature, winning 51 of 73 seats. In its first sitting on 26 April 2004, the legislature re-elected Mbhazima Shilowa as Premier of Gauteng. It also elected Richard Mdakane as Speaker and Mary Metcalfe as Deputy Speaker.

The Democratic Alliance, with 15 seats, was the official opposition in the legislature. Also represented in the legislature were the Inkatha Freedom Party (IFP), the African Christian Democratic Party (ACDP), the Freedom Front Plus (FF+), the Independent Democrats (ID), the Pan Africanist Congress of Azania (PAC), and the United Democratic Movement (UDM). For the first time since the legislature was established in 1994, the New National Party was not represented.

Metcalfe resigned from the legislature in 2005 and was replaced as Deputy Speaker by Sophia Williams-De Bruyn. Moreover, in 2008, Shilowa resigned as Premier and Paul Mashatile was elected to replace him.

== Composition ==
| Party | Seats |
|---|---|
| African National Congress | 51 |
| DA | 15 |
| Inkatha Freedom Party | 2 |
| African Christian Democratic Party | 1 |
| VF+ | 1 |
| Independent Democrats | 1 |
| Pan Africanist Congress of Azania | 1 |
| United Democratic Front | 1 |
| Total | 73 |

== Members ==
The table below lists the members elected to the provincial legislature in the April 2004 election; it does not take into account changes in membership after the election.

| Member | Party |
|---|---|
| Lydia Meshoe | ACDP |
| Pamotanji Johannes Bokaba | ANC |
| Firoz Cachalia | ANC |
| Motlalepula Chabaku | ANC |
| Barbara Creecy | ANC |
| Sam de Beer | ANC |
| Buyisiwe Regina Dhladhla | ANC |
| Ignatius Jacobs | ANC |
| Trevor Fowler | ANC |
| Mondli Gungubele | ANC |
| Refilwe Sophia Letwaba | ANC |
| Bob Mabaso | ANC |
| Nomopo Maggie Madlala | ANC |
| Errol Magerman | ANC |
| Qedani Mahlangu | ANC |
| Sipho John Makama | ANC |
| Pule Isaac Malefane | ANC |
| Lindiwe Maseko | ANC |
| Paul Mashatile | ANC |
| Faith Mazibuko | ANC |
| Valentine Mbatha | ANC |
| Richard Mdakane | ANC |
| Mary Metcalfe | ANC |
| Angelina Mmatlou Moeng | ANC |
| Jacqueline Mofokeng | ANC |
| Annah Refilwe Mogale | ANC |
| Moabi Daniel Mohapi | ANC |
| Uhuru Moiloa | ANC |
| Nomvula Mokonyane | ANC |
| Khabisi Mosunkutu | ANC |
| Angie Motshekga | ANC |
| Mathole Motshekga | ANC |
| Cetshwayo Amon Msane | ANC |
| Samson Bengeza Mthombeni | ANC |
| Refiloe Nosipho Ndzuta | ANC |
| Steward Ngwenya | ANC |
| Mandla Nkomfe | ANC |
| Bekizwe Nkosi | ANC |
| Hope Papo | ANC |
| Nomalizo Joyce Pekane | ANC |
| Mbongeni Radebe | ANC |
| Nomantu Ralehoko | ANC |
| Gwen Ramokgopa | ANC |
| Ram Salojee | ANC |
| Michael Homotsang Seloane | ANC |
| Doreen Senkoanyane | ANC |
| Sicelo Shiceka | ANC |
| Mbhazima Shilowa | ANC |
| Nokuthula Sikakane | ANC |
| Elliot Mshiyeni Sogoni | ANC |
| Dikeledi Tsotetsi | ANC |
| Godfrey Tsotetsi | ANC |
| Jack Bloom | DA |
| Philippus Bernardus de Wet | DA |
| Brian Goodall | DA |
| Rose Esther Gudlhuza | DA |
| Hermene Koorts | DA |
| Hendrika Johanna Lodiwika Kruger | DA |
| Patricia Betty Mokgohlwa | DA |
| John Moodey | DA |
| Cornelia Margaritha Elizabeth Plüddemann | DA |
| Chabeli Salmon Nkhi | DA |
| David Quail | DA |
| Glenda Jane Steyn | DA |
| James Martin Swart | DA |
| Paul Samuel Robert Willemburg | DA |
| Frederik Gerhardus Andreas Wolmarans | DA |
| Jaco Mulder | FF+ |
| Themba Sono | ID |
| Gertrude Mzizi | IFP |
| Sibongile Nkomo | IFP |
| Malesela Ledwaba | PAC |
| Nomakhosazana Mncedane | UDM |

Members who joined the legislature during the term included:

- Joachim Boers (ANC)
- Sophia Williams-De Bruyn (ANC)
- Brian Hlongwa (ANC)
- Kgaogelo Lekgoro (ANC)
