= List of members of the 2nd Gauteng Provincial Legislature =

2nd Gauteng Provincial Legislature
←	1st Legislature	3rd Legislature	→
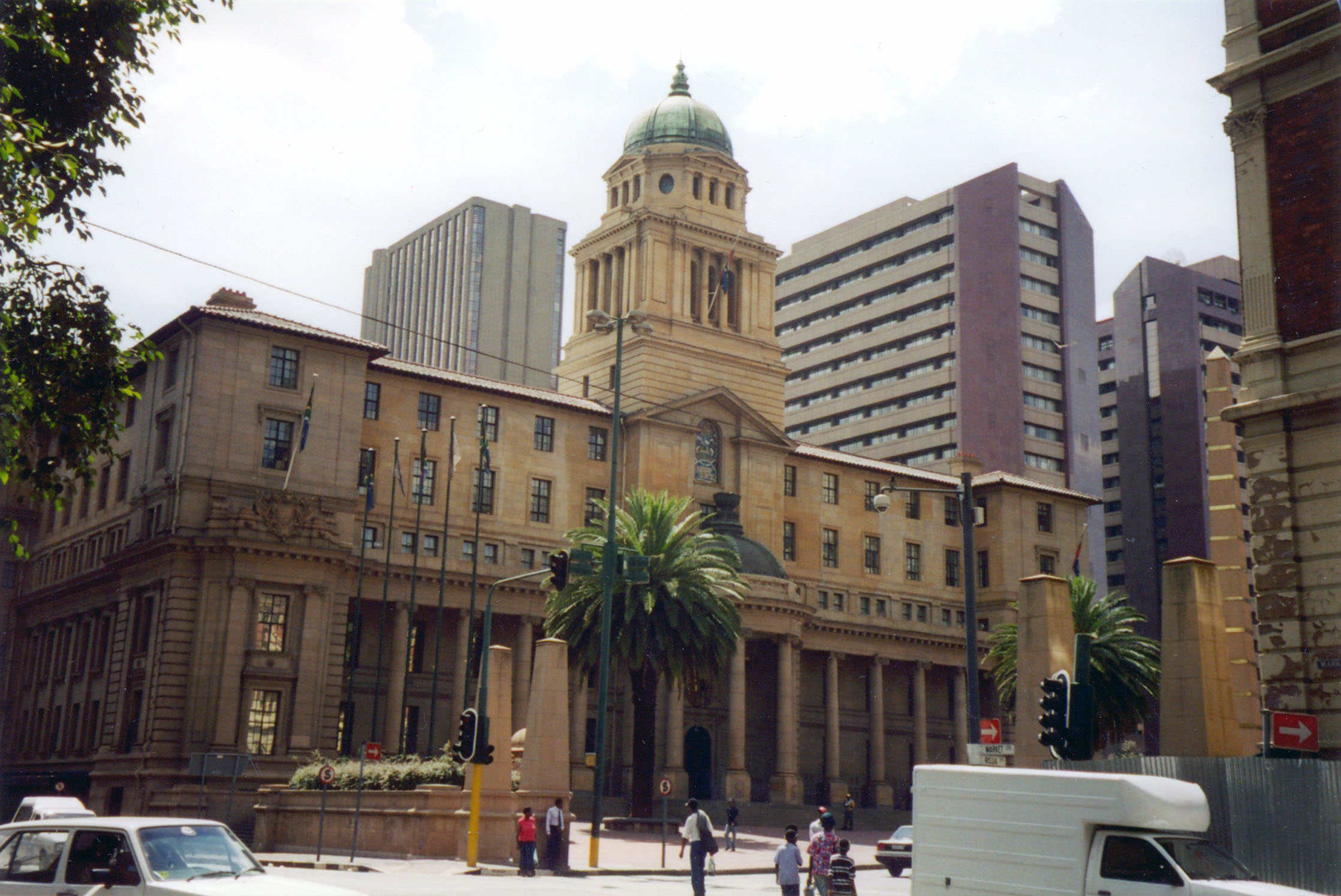
- Johannesburg City Hall

Overview
- Legislative body: Gauteng Provincial Legislature
- Jurisdiction: Gauteng, South Africa
- Meeting place: Johannesburg City Hall
- Term: 15 June 1999 – April 2004
- Election: 2 June 1999
- Members: 73
- Speaker: Firoz Cachalia
- Premier: Mbhazima Shilowa
- Party control: African National Congress

This is a list of members of the second Gauteng Provincial Legislature as elected in the election of 2 June 1999. In that election, the African National Congress (ANC) retained the majority it had won in South Africa's first post-apartheid elections in 1994; it held all 50 of its 73 seats in the legislature. The Democratic Party was the official opposition, from 2000 as part of the Democratic Alliance. The ANC's Mbhazima Shilowa was elected Premier of Gauteng and Firoz Cachalia served as Speaker.

== Composition ==
Party	Seats
African National Congress	50
Democratic Party	13
Inkatha Freedom Party	3
New National Party	3
African Christian Democratic Party	1
Federal Alliance	1
VF+	1
United Democratic Front	1
Total	73

== Members ==
This is a list of members of the second legislature as elected in June 1999. The list does not take into account changes in membership after the election.

Member	Party
Kenneth Batyi	ANC
Joachim Boers	ANC
Johannes Pamotanji Bokaba	ANC
Firoz Cachalia	ANC
Barbara Creecy	ANC
Mohammed Dangor	ANC
Trevor Fowler	ANC
Joan Fubbs	ANC
Mondli Gungubele	ANC
Ignatius Jacobs	ANC
Joyce Kgoali	ANC
Kaizer Mzikayise Klaas	ANC
Bob Mabaso	ANC
Nomopo Maggie Madlala	ANC
Jacolina Mahlangu	ANC
Sipho Makama	ANC
Pule Malefane	ANC
Lindiwe Maseko	ANC
Paul Mashatile	ANC
Amos Masondo	ANC
Toenka Matila	ANC
Faith Mazibuko	ANC
Richard Mdakane	ANC
Mary Metcalfe	ANC
Dan Mohapi	ANC
Uhuru Moiloa	ANC
Nomvula Mokonyane	ANC
Jabu Moleketi	ANC
Khabisi Mosunkutu	ANC
Angie Motshekga	ANC
Mathole Motshekga	ANC
Amon Msane	ANC
Steward Ngwenya	ANC
Mandla Nkomfe	ANC
Nomantu Nkomo	ANC
Bheki Nkosi	ANC
Hope Papo	ANC
Mbongeni Radebe	ANC
Gwen Ramokgopa	ANC
Dorothy Ramodibe	ANC
Ram Salojee	ANC
Mike Seloane	ANC
Sicelo Shiceka	ANC
Mbhazima Shilowa	ANC
Vusi Skosana	ANC
Mshiyeni Sogoni	ANC
Dikeledi Tsotetsi	ANC
Godfrey Tsotetsi	ANC
Sheila Weinberg	ANC
Lindiwe Zulu	ANC
Jack Bloom	DP
Manuel de Freitas	DP
Anchen Dreyer	DP
Daniel Jacobus Erasmus	DP
Brian Goodall	DP
Hermene Koorts	DP
Peter Horwitz	DP
Peter Leon	DP
Shelley Joy Loe	DP
Sibongile Mahlangu	DP
Catharina Prinsloo	DP
David Quail	DP
Butch Steyn	DP
Gerda Bekker	IFP
Gertrude Mzizi	IFP
Sibongile Nkomo	IFP
Johan Kilian	NNP
Julie Kilian	NNP
Vincent Thusi	NNP
Lydia Meshoe	ACDP
Jacobus Frederik Bosman	FA
Joseph Chiole	FF+
Lulama Mshumpela	UDM
