= Executive Council of Gauteng =

Executive arm of a South African province

The Executive Council of Gauteng is the cabinet of the executive branch of the provincial government in the South African province of Gauteng. The Members of the Executive Council (MECs) are appointed from among the members of the Gauteng Provincial Legislature by the Premier of Gauteng, an office held since October 2022 by Panyaza Lesufi.

== Sexwale and Motshekga premierships: 1994–1999 ==
The first Premier of Gauteng, Tokyo Sexwale, was elected to office in the 1994 general election and appointed Gauteng's inaugural Executive Council, with representation for the opposition National Party (NP) in line with the constitutional requirement to form a Government of National Unity. Premier Mathole Motshekga, who took office after Sexwale's resignation in 1998, largely preserved Sexwale's Executive Council.

Partial Gauteng Executive Council 1994–1999
| Post | Member | Term | | Party | Ref. |
|---|---|---|---|---|---|
| Premier of Gauteng | Mathole Motshekga | 1998 | 1999 | ANC | |
| Premier of Gauteng | Tokyo Sexwale | 1994 | 1998 | ANC | |
| MEC for Finance and Economic Affairs | Jabu Moleketi | 1994 | 1999 | ANC | |
| MEC for Health | Mondli Gungubele | 1997 | 1999 | ANC | |
| MEC for Health | Amos Masondo | 1994 | 1997 | ANC | |
| MEC for Education | Mary Metcalfe | 1994 | 1999 | ANC | |
| MEC for Housing | Dan Mofokeng | 1994 | 1999 | ANC | |
| MEC for Agriculture, Conservation and Environment | Nomvula Mokonyane | 1996 | 1999 | ANC | |
| MEC for Agriculture, Conservation and Environment | John Mavuso | 1994 | 1996 | NP | |
| MEC for Safety and Security | Paul Mashatile | 1998 | 1999 | ANC | |
| MEC for Safety and Security | Jessie Duarte | 1994 | 1998 | ANC | |
| MEC for Public Works and Transport | Joyce Kgoali | 1998 | 1999 | ANC | |
| MEC for Public Works and Transport | Paul Mashatile | 1996 | 1998 | ANC | |
| MEC for Public Works and Transport | Olaus van Zyl | 1994 | | NP | |
| MEC for Development Planning and Local Government | Sicelo Shiceka | 1994 | 1999 | ANC | |
| MEC for Social Welfare | Sakkie Blanché | 1994 | | NP | |
| MEC for Sport, Recreation, Arts and Culture | Peter Skosana | 1994 | | ANC | |

== Shilowa premiership ==
=== First term: 1999–2004 ===
In June 1999, pursuant to the 1999 general election, newly elected Premier Mbhazima Shilowa announced his new Executive Council, the composition of which was controversial in the provincial ANC – most of the members, for example, were members of the South African Communist Party.

Gauteng Executive Council 1999–2004
| Post | Member | Term | | Party |
|---|---|---|---|---|
| Premier of Gauteng | Mbhazima Shilowa | 1999 | 2004 | ANC |
| MEC for Finance and Economic Affairs | Jabu Moleketi | 1999 | 2004 | ANC |
| MEC for Health | Gwen Ramokgopa | 1999 | 2004 | ANC |
| MEC for Education | Ignatius Jacobs | 1999 | 2004 | ANC |
| MEC for Housing | Paul Mashatile | 1999 | 2004 | ANC |
| MEC for Agriculture, Conservation and Environment and Land Affairs | Mary Metcalfe | 1999 | 2004 | ANC |
| MEC for Sports and Recreation | Mondli Gungubele | 1999 | 2004 | ANC |
| MEC for Safety and Community Liaison | Nomvula Mokonyane | 1999 | 2004 | ANC |
| MEC for Transport and Public Works | Khabisi Mosunkutu | 1999 | 2004 | ANC |
| MEC for Development Planning and Local Government | Trevor Fowler | 1999 | 2004 | ANC |
| MEC for Social Services and Population Development | Angie Motshekga | 2000 | 2004 | ANC |

=== Second term: 2004–2008 ===
On 29 April 2004, following the 2004 general election, the Gauteng Executive Council, still led by Shilowa, was sworn in to office. On 23 March 2006, Shilowa announced a minor reshuffle, appointing Kgaogelo Lekgoro as Social Development MEC – a position vacated by Bob Mabaso earlier that year amid a sexual harassment scandal – and replacing Health MEC Gwen Ramokgopa with Brian Hlongwa.

Gauteng Executive Council 2004–2008
| Post | Member | Term | | Party |
|---|---|---|---|---|
| Premier of Gauteng | Mbhazima Shilowa | 2004 | 2008 | ANC |
| MEC for Finance and Economic Affairs | Paul Mashatile | 2004 | 2008 | ANC |
| MEC for Health | Brian Hlongwa | 2006 | 2008 | ANC |
| MEC for Health | Gwen Ramokgopa | 2004 | 2006 | ANC |
| MEC for Education | Angie Motshekga | 2004 | 2008 | ANC |
| MEC for Agriculture, Conservation and the Environment | Khabisi Mosunkutu | 2004 | 2008 | ANC |
| MEC for Housing | Nomvula Mokonyane | 2004 | 2008 | ANC |
| MEC for Public Transport, Roads and Works | Ignatius Jacobs | 2004 | 2008 | ANC |
| MEC for Sport, Art, Culture and Recreation | Barbara Creecy | 2004 | 2008 | ANC |
| MEC for Community Safety | Firoz Cachalia | 2004 | 2008 | ANC |
| MEC for Local Government | Qedani Mahlangu | 2004 | 2008 | ANC |
| MEC for Social Development | Kgaogelo Lekgoro | 2006 | 2008 | ANC |
| MEC for Social Development | Bob Mabaso | 2004 | 2006 | ANC |

== Mashatile premiership: 2008–2009 ==
Paul Mashatile was elected Premier in October 2008 when the incumbent Premier, Mbhazima Shilowa, resigned in order to defect from the governing African National Congress (ANC) to the opposition Congress of the People. Mashatile entirely preserved the composition of Shilowa's Executive Council, except that he appointed Mandla Nkomfe to replace himself as MEC for Finance and Economic Affairs.

Gauteng Executive Council 2008–2009
| Post | Member | Term | | Party |
|---|---|---|---|---|
| Premier of Gauteng | Paul Mashatile | 2008 | 2009 | ANC |
| MEC for Finance and Economic Affairs | Mandla Nkomfe | 2008 | 2009 | ANC |
| MEC for Health | Brian Hlongwa | 2008 | 2009 | ANC |
| MEC for Education | Angie Motshekga | 2008 | 2009 | ANC |
| MEC for Agriculture, Conservation and the Environment | Khabisi Mosunkutu | 2008 | 2009 | ANC |
| MEC for Housing | Nomvula Mokonyane | 2008 | 2009 | ANC |
| MEC for Public Transport, Roads and Works | Ignatius Jacobs | 2008 | 2009 | ANC |
| MEC for Sport, Art, Culture and Recreation | Barbara Creecy | 2008 | 2009 | ANC |
| MEC for Community Safety | Firoz Cachalia | 2008 | 2009 | ANC |
| MEC for Local Government | Qedani Mahlangu | 2008 | 2009 | ANC |
| MEC for Social Development | Kgaogelo Lekgoro | 2008 | 2009 | ANC |

== Mokonyane premiership: 2009–2014 ==
On 8 May 2009, pursuant to the 2009 general election, newly elected Premier Nomvula Mokonyane announced the new Gauteng Executive Council. A month later, on 9 June, she announced that Nandi Mayathula-Khoza had been appointed MEC for Agriculture and Rural Development following the resignation of Nomantu Nkomo-Ralehoko.

On 2 November 2010, Mokonyane announced a major cabinet reshuffle, which she said she had devised "after consultations with the provincial leadership" of the ANC. However, it was widely believed that Mokonyane had been forced to make the changes by allies of former Premier Paul Mashatile, who had recently beaten Mokonyane in an election for the position of Provincial Chairperson of the Gauteng ANC. On 16 July 2012, Mokonyane announced another reshuffle, affecting four portfolios and occasioned by the resignation of Local Government and Housing MEC Humphrey Mmemezi. In August 2013, Eric Xayiya was appointed to replace Economic Development MEC Nkosiphendule Kolisile, who died in a car accident in July 2013.

Gauteng Executive Council 2009–2014
| Post | Member | Term | | Party |
|---|---|---|---|---|
| Premier of Gauteng | Nomvula Mokonyane | 2009 | 2014 | ANC |
| MEC for Finance | Mandla Nkomfe | 2009 | 2014 | ANC |
| MEC for Health and Social Development | Hope Papo | 2012 | 2014 | ANC |
| MEC for Health and Social Development | Ntombi Mekgwe | 2010 | 2012 | ANC |
| MEC for Health and Social Development | Qedani Mahlangu | 2009 | 2010 | ANC |
| MEC for Education | Barbara Creecy | 2009 | 2014 | ANC |
| MEC for Economic Development | Mxolisi Eric Xayiya | 2013 | 2014 | ANC |
| MEC for Economic Development | Nkosiphendule Kolisile | 2012 | 2013 | ANC |
| MEC for Economic Development | Qedani Mahlangu | 2010 | 2012 | ANC |
| MEC for Economic Development | Firoz Cachalia | 2009 | 2010 | ANC |
| MEC for Community Safety | Faith Mazibuko | 2010 | 2014 | ANC |
| MEC for Community Safety | Khabisi Mosunkutu | 2009 | 2010 | ANC |
| MEC for Local Government and Housing | Ntombi Mekgwe | 2012 | 2014 | ANC |
| MEC for Local Government and Housing | Humphrey Mmemezi | 2010 | 2012 | ANC |
| MEC for Local Government and Housing | Kgaogelo Lekgoro | 2009 | 2010 | ANC |
| MEC for Agriculture and Rural Development | Nandi Mayathula-Khoza | 2009 | 2014 | ANC |
| MEC for Agriculture and Rural Development | Nomantu Nkomo-Ralehoko | 2009 | 2009 | ANC |
| MEC for Roads and Transport | Ismail Vadi | 2010 | 2014 | ANC |
| MEC for Roads and Transport | Bheki Nkosi | 2009 | 2010 | ANC |
| MEC for Sport, Recreation, Arts and Culture | Lebogang Maile | 2010 | 2014 | ANC |
| MEC for Sport, Recreation, Arts and Culture | Nelisiwe Mbatha-Mthimkhulu | 2009 | 2010 | ANC |
| MEC for Infrastructure Development | Qedani Mahlangu | 2012 | 2014 | ANC |
| MEC for Infrastructure Development | Bheki Nkosi | 2010 | 2012 | ANC |
| MEC for Infrastructure Development | Faith Mazibuko | 2009 | 2010 | ANC |

== Makhura premiership ==
=== First term: 2014–2019 ===
On 23 May 2014, pursuant to the 2014 general election, newly elected Premier David Makhura announced his new Executive Council. On 2 February 2016, he announced a reshuffle affecting three portfolios: Human Settlements, Social Development, and Infrastructure Development. In October 2015, he announced that Faith Mazibuko and Molebatsi Bopape would swap portfolios, with some adjustments to the portfolios themselves: Mazibuko became MEC for Sports, Heritage, Arts and Culture, and Bopape became MEC for Social Development.

In February 2017, Qedani Mahlangu resigned as Health MEC in the wake of the Life Esidimeni scandal, and Makhura appointed Gwen Ramokgopa to replace her. Finally, in March 2018, Uhuru Moiloa was appointed to the Executive Council to replace Paul Mashatile, who resigned to take up the full-time post of ANC Treasurer-General.

Gauteng Executive Council 2014–2019
| Post | Member | Term | | Party |
|---|---|---|---|---|
| Premier of Gauteng | David Makhura | 2014 | 2019 | ANC |
| MEC for Finance | Barbara Creecy | 2014 | 2019 | ANC |
| MEC for Health | Gwen Ramokgopa | 2017 | 2019 | ANC |
| MEC for Health | Qedani Mahlangu | 2014 | 2017 | ANC |
| MEC for Education | Panyaza Lesufi | 2014 | 2019 | ANC |
| MEC for Economic Development | Lebogang Maile | 2014 | 2019 | ANC |
| MEC for Infrastructure Development | Jacob Mamabolo | 2016 | 2019 | ANC |
| MEC for Infrastructure Development | Nandi Mayathula-Khoza | 2014 | 2016 | ANC |
| MEC for Community Safety | Sizakele Nkosi-Malobane | 2014 | 2019 | ANC |
| MEC for Transport | Ismail Vadi | 2014 | 2019 | ANC |
| MEC for Human Settlements and Local Government | Uhuru Moiloa | 2018 | 2019 | ANC |
| MEC for Human Settlements and Local Government | Paul Mashatile | 2016 | 2018 | ANC |
| MEC for Human Settlements and Local Government | Jacob Mamabolo | 2014 | 2016 | ANC |
| MEC for Sports, Heritage, Arts and Culture | Faith Mazibuko | 2015 | 2019 | ANC |
| MEC for Sport, Recreation, Arts and Culture | Molebatsi Bopape | 2014 | 2015 | ANC |
| MEC for Social Development | Nandi Mayathula-Khoza | 2016 | 2019 | ANC |
| MEC for Social Development | Molebatsi Bopape | 2015 | 2016 | ANC |
| MEC for Agriculture, Environment, Rural Development and Social Development | Faith Mazibuko | 2014 | 2015 | ANC |

=== Second term: 2019–2022 ===
On 29 May 2019, following the 2019 general election, Makhura announced his new Executive Council, to be sworn in the following day. Not reflected in the table is the fact that Panyaza Lesufi was initially appointed MEC for Finance and E-Government and Nomantu Nkomo-Ralehoko was initially MEC for Education: Makhura reversed these appointments two days later, acquiescing in public calls for Lesufi to remain in the education portfolio (where he had been installed in 2014) and therefore appointing Nkomo-Ralehoko as MEC for Finance and E-Government.

On 11 October 2019, Kgosientso Ramokgopa resigned as MEC for Economic Development, Agriculture and Environment and was replaced by Morakane Mosupyoe; on 19 June 2020, Nomathemba Mokgethi became MEC for Social Development, filling a vacancy left by Thuliswa Nkabinde-Khawe's death in November 2019. On 2 December 2020, Makhura announced a reshuffle affecting three portfolios – Economic Development, Social Development, and Health – after the former MEC for Health, Bandile Masuku, was fired amid a COVID-19 procurement scandal.

Gauteng Executive Council 2019–2022
| Post | Member | Term | | Party |
|---|---|---|---|---|
| Premier of Gauteng | David Makhura | 2014 | 2022 | ANC |
| MEC for Finance and E-Government | Nomantu Nkomo-Ralehoko | 2019 | 2022 | ANC |
| MEC for Health | Nomathemba Mokgethi | 2020 | 2022 | ANC |
| MEC for Health | Bandile Masuku | 2019 | 2020 | ANC |
| MEC for Education | Panyaza Lesufi | 2019 | 2022 | ANC |
| MEC for Economic Development | Parks Tau | 2020 | 2022 | ANC |
| MEC for Economic Development, Agriculture and Environment | Morakane Mosupyoe | 2019 | 2020 | ANC |
| MEC for Economic Development, Agriculture and Environment | Kgosientso Ramokgopa | 2019 | 2019 | ANC |
| MEC for Infrastructure Development and Property Management | Tasneem Motara | 2019 | 2022 | ANC |
| MEC for Community Safety | Faith Mazibuko | 2019 | 2022 | ANC |
| MEC for Public Transport and Road Infrastructure | Jacob Mamabolo | 2019 | 2022 | ANC |
| MEC for Human Settlements, Urban Planning and Cooperative Governance and Traditional Affairs | Lebogang Maile | 2019 | 2022 | ANC |
| MEC for Sport, Arts, Culture and Recreation | Mbali Hlophe | 2019 | 2022 | ANC |
| MEC for Social Development | Morakane Mosupyoe | 2020 | 2022 | ANC |
| MEC for Social Development | Nomathemba Mokgethi | 2020 | 2020 | ANC |
| MEC for Social Development | Thuliswa Nkabinde-Khawe | 2019 | 2019 | ANC |

== Lesufi premiership: 2022–present ==
=== First term: 2022–2024 ===
On 7 October 2022, the day after he replaced Premier David Makhura, Premier Panyaza Lesufi appointed a new Executive Council in which he retained seven of Makhura's MECs but transferred them to new portfolios. His Executive Council comprised himself and ten additional members.

Gauteng Executive Council 2022–2024
| Post | Member | Term | | Party |
|---|---|---|---|---|
| Premier of Gauteng | Panyaza Lesufi | 2022 | 2024 | ANC |
| MEC for Finance | Jacob Mamabolo | 2022 | 2024 | ANC |
| MEC for Health and Wellness | Nomantu Nkomo-Ralehoko | 2022 | 2024 | ANC |
| MEC for Education | Matome Chiloane | 2022 | 2024 | ANC |
| MEC for Economic Development and Tourism | Tasneem Motara | 2022 | 2024 | ANC |
| MEC for Safety and Security | Faith Mazibuko | 2022 | 2024 | ANC |
| MEC for Transport and Logistics | Kedibone Diale | 2022 | 2024 | ANC |
| MEC for Cooperative Governance and Traditional Affairs and E-Governance | Mzikayifane Khumalo | 2022 | 2024 | ANC |
| MEC for Human Settlements and Infrastructure | Lebogang Maile | 2022 | 2024 | ANC |
| MEC for Sport, Art, Culture and Recreation | Morakane Mosupyoe | 2022 | 2024 | ANC |
| MEC for Social Development | Mbali Hlophe | 2022 | 2024 | ANC |

=== Second term: 2024–present ===
After the ANC lost its majority in the Gauteng Provincial Legislature, Lesufi was voted to return to office as premier of the province with the support of the Democratic Alliance on 14 June 2024. The parties negotiated and attempted to form a "Provincial Government of Unity" but negotiations ultimately collapsed in early-July 2024 which led to Lesufi announcing his executive council comprising members of the African National Congress, the Patriotic Alliance, the Inkatha Freedom Party, and Rise Mzansi on 3 July 2024. Lesufi said that he intended to lead a minority government, while the DA took up its position as the official opposition again. In June 2025, Lesufi appointed Ewan Botha to replace Sheila Peters as the MEC for the Environment. Lesufi reshuffled his executive again on 1 April 2026 to include Nkululeko Dunga as the MEC for Finance after the Economic Freedom Fighters and ANC reached a coalition agreement; the Education MEC Matome Chiloane was removed from the executive council to accommodate Dunga.

Gauteng Executive Council 2024–present
| Post | Member | Term | | Party |
|---|---|---|---|---|
| Premier of Gauteng | Panyaza Lesufi | 2024 | Incumbent | ANC |
| MEC for e-Government | Bonginkosi Dhlamini | 2024 | Incumbent | IFP |
| MEC for Finance | Nkululeko Dunga | 2026 | Incumbent | EFF |
| MEC for Finance and Economic Development | Lebogang Maile | 2024 | 2026 | ANC |
| MEC for Education and Sports, Arts, Culture and Recreation | Lebogang Maile | 2026 | Incumbent | ANC |
| MEC for Education and Sports, Arts, Culture and Recreation | Matome Chiloane | 2024 | 2026 | ANC |
| MEC for Health and Wellness | Faith Mazibuko | 2026 | Incumbent | ANC |
| MEC for Health and Wellness | Nomantu Nkomo-Ralehoko | 2024 | 2026 | ANC |
| MEC for Roads, Transport and Logistics | Kedibone Diale-Tlabela | 2024 | Incumbent | ANC |
| MEC for Human Settlements | Tasneem Motara | 2024 | Incumbent | ANC |
| MEC for Social Development | Nomantu Nkomo-Ralehoko | 2026 | Incumbent | ANC |
| MEC for Social Development | Faith Mazibuko | 2024 | 2026 | ANC |
| MEC for Economic Development and Agriculture and Rural Development | Vuyiswa Ramokgopa | 2026 | Incumbent | Rise Mzansi |
| MEC for Agriculture and Rural Development | Vuyiswa Ramokgopa | 2024 | 2026 | Rise Mzansi |
| MEC for Infrastructure Development and Cooperative Governance and Traditional Affairs | Jacob Mamabolo | 2024 | Incumbent | ANC |
| MEC for Environment | Ewan Botha | 2025 | Incumbent | PA |
| MEC for Environment | Sheila Mary Peters | 2024 | 2025 | PA |

== See also ==
- Template: Gauteng Executive Council
- Government of South Africa
- Constitution of South Africa
- Transvaal province
