= Tasneem Motara =

South African politician (born 1982)

Tasneem Motara MPL
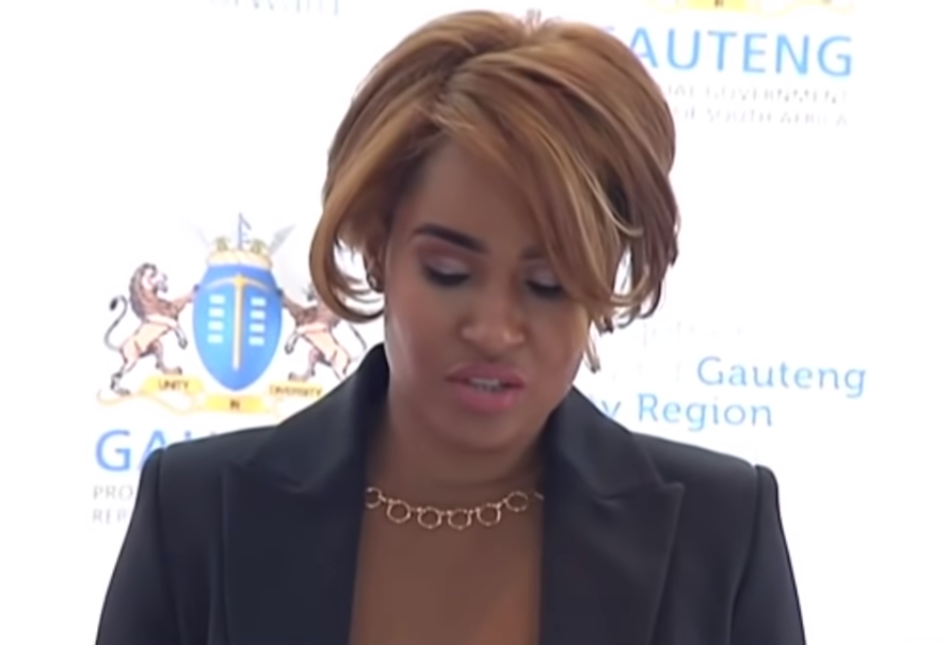
- Motara in May 2019

Gauteng MEC for Human Settlements
- Incumbent
- Assumed office 3 July 2024
- Premier: Panyaza Lesufi
- Preceded by: Lebogang Maile

Gauteng MEC for Economic Development
- In office 7 October 2022 – 14 June 2024
- Premier: Panyaza Lesufi
- Preceded by: Parks Tau
- Succeeded by: Lebogang Maile (for Finance and Economic Development)

Gauteng MEC for Infrastructure Development and Property Management
- In office 30 May 2019 – 6 October 2022
- Premier: David Makhura
- Preceded by: Jacob Mamabolo
- Succeeded by: Lebogang Maile (for Human Settlements and Infrastructure)

Member of the Gauteng Provincial Legislature
- Incumbent
- Assumed office 22 May 2019

Permanent Delegate to the National Council of Provinces

Assembly Member for Gauteng
- In office 22 May 2014 – 7 May 2019

Personal details
- Born: 7 December 1982 (age 43) Benoni, Transvaal Province; South Africa
- Party: African National Congress
- Spouse: Phiwe Maphanga
- Education: University of South Africa
- Profession: Politician

Tasneem Motara (born 7 December 1982) is a South African politician from Gauteng. A member of the African National Congress (ANC), she has served in the Gauteng Provincial Legislature and Gauteng Executive Council since 2019. She is currently serving as the province's Member of the Executive Council (MEC) for Human Settlements.

Motara entered politics through the ANC Youth League in her hometown of Ekurhuleni. She represented the ANC in the National Council of Provinces between 2014 and 2019, serving as chief whip of the council's Gauteng delegation, and joined the provincial government after the May 2019 general election. Before she was appointed to her current portfolio in July 2024, she was the MEC for Infrastructure Development and Property Management from 2019 to 2022 and the MEC for Economic Development from 2022 to 2024.

She has been a member of the Gauteng ANC's Provincial Executive Committee since 2018. During that time, she was the provincial party's deputy provincial secretary between June 2022 and February 2025.

== Early life and education ==
Motara was born on 7 December 1982 in Benoni on the East Rand in the former Transvaal Province. Her family was multiracial – her father was Indian and her mother Coloured – and supported the African National Congress (ANC). Motara was active in the South African Students Congress and joined the ANC Youth League's local branch in Benoni as a teenager in 2000.

She has a degree in psychology from the University of South Africa, completed while she was working in politics. During her early career, she worked in the financial sector, construction sector, and public sector, among other things as deputy chairperson of the National Youth Development Agency. She remained active in ANC politics on the East Rand, and by 2014 she was a member of the provincial executive committee of the ANC Youth League's Gauteng branch and a member of the regional executive committee of the mainstream ANC's Ekurhuleni branch.

== Political career ==
=== National Council of Provinces: 2014–2019 ===
In the May 2014 general election, Motara was elected to an ANC seat in the National Council of Provinces, the upper house of the South African Parliament. She was appointed as chief whip of the provincial delegation from Gauteng. She also represented the council on the Magistrate's Commission and the Southern African Development Community's Parliamentary Forum, and the ANC assigned her as its constituency contact in Benoni. According to the Parliamentary Monitoring Group, she was the seventh-youngest parliamentarian in the Fifth Parliament and the ANC's youngest parliamentary representative.

Ahead of the ANC's 54th National Conference in December 2017, Motara supported the losing candidate, Nkosazana Dlamini-Zuma. In July 2018, a provincial ANC conference elected her as a member of the Gauteng ANC's leadership structure, the Provincial Executive Committee; by number of votes received, she was ranked tenth of the committee's thirty additional members. She also served as the committee's spokesperson.

=== Gauteng Executive Council: 2019–present ===
In the May 2019 Gauteng provincial election, Motara was elected to an ANC seat in the Gauteng Provincial Legislature. Announcing his Executive Council on 29 May, Premier David Makhura named her as Member of the Executive Council (MEC) for Infrastructure Development and Property Management. In that capacity she oversaw the province's major investments in health infrastructure during the COVID-19 pandemic; some of the investment decisions were highly controversial.

Motara was still in the infrastructure portfolio in June 2022 when the ANC held its next provincial elective conference. The plenary session of the conference nominated her from the floor to run against Nomathemba Mokgethi for the position of deputy provincial secretary of the party. Though she stood on a slate of candidates aligned to unsuccessful leadership challenger Lebogang Maile, Motara prevailed in the vote on 27 June.

In the aftermath of the party conference, in early October 2022, Makhura resigned from the government. Motara, with Panyaza Lesufi and Kedibone Diale, was one of three representatives whom the Gauteng party nominated as a possible successor to the premiership. Lesufi was elected instead, and on 7 October 2022, announcing his new Executive Council, he promoted Motara to the office of MEC for Economic Development, in which capacity she replaced Parks Tau. Lesufi said that he had given her a mandate to prioritise township business development. However, Motara's most high-profile decisions in the portfolio pertained to the governance of the Gauteng Gambling Board (GGB) and Gauteng Growth and Development Agency (GGDA); in the first half of 2023, the boards of both agencies were disbanded, and Motara was embroiled in a protracted dispute about the appointment of a new GGDA chief executive.

After the next provincial election in May 2024, Lesufi named Motara as MEC for Human Settlements, with Maile taking over the economic development portfolio. Motara had again been nominated as one of three potential premier candidates before Lesufi was selected for re-election.

In response to the Gauteng ANC's poor performance in the 2024 election, the ANC National Executive Committee disbanded the incumbent leadership of the provincial party, meaning that Motara lost her position as deputy provincial secretary. She was given responsibility for fundraising in the interim task team appointed to lead the provincial party until the next elective conference.

== Personal life ==
Motara is married and has three children. Her husband is businessman Phiwe Maphanga.

In January 2018, Motara announced that she was HIV positive after her former partner threatened to expose her status. She tested positive for COVID-19 on 3 July 2020.
