= Ntombi Mekgwe =

South African politician (born 1964)

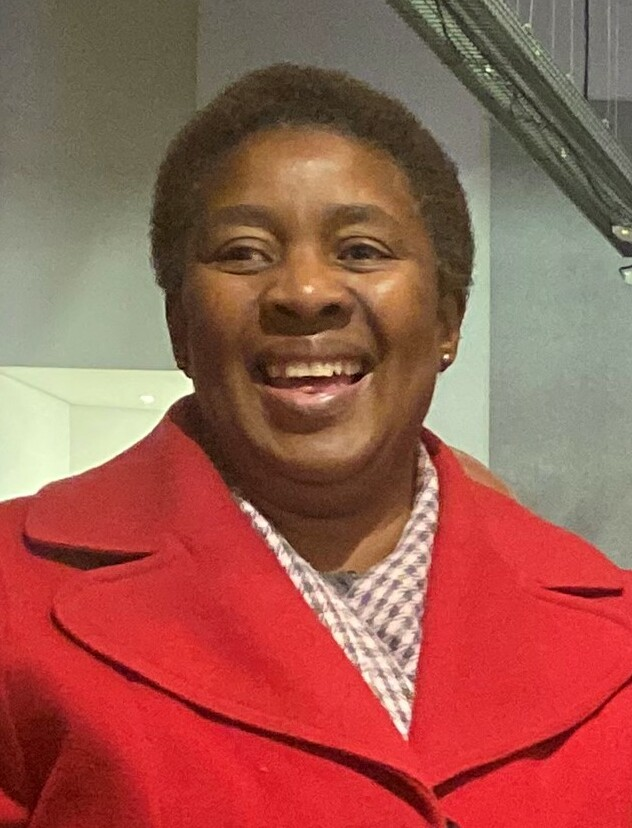
- Mekgwe in 2023

Speaker of the Gauteng Provincial Legislature
- In office 21 May 2014 – 28 May 2024
- Preceded by: Lindiwe Maseko
- Succeeded by: Morakane Mosupyoe

Member of the Gauteng Executive Council for Local Government and Housing
- In office 16 July 2012 – May 2014
- Premier: Nomvula Mokonyane
- Preceded by: Humphrey Mmemezi
- Succeeded by: Jacob Mamabolo (for Human Settlements and Local Government)

Member of the Gauteng Executive Council for Social Development and Health
- In office 2 November 2010 – 16 July 2012
- Premier: Nomvula Mokonyane
- Preceded by: Qedani Mahlangu
- Succeeded by: Hope Papo

Provincial Treasurer of the African National Congress in Gauteng
- In office May 2010 – July 2018
- Chairperson: Paul Mashatile
- Preceded by: Lindiwe Maseko
- Succeeded by: Parks Tau

Mayor of Ekurhuleni
- In office 15 July 2008 – 2 November 2010
- Preceded by: Duma Nkosi
- Succeeded by: Mondli Gungubele

Personal details
- Born: Lentheng Helen Mekgwe; 21 October 1964 (age 61) Chatterston, Transvaal; South Africa
- Party: African National Congress

Lentheng Helen Mekgwe (known as Ntombi Mekgwe; born 21 October 1964) is a South African politician who was Speaker of the Gauteng Provincial Legislature from 2014 until 2024. Before that, she was a Member of the Executive Council (MEC) in the Gauteng provincial government from 2010 to 2014 and the third Mayor of Ekurhuleni from 2008 to 2010. She is a member of the African National Congress (ANC).

Born on Gauteng's East Rand, Mekgwe was Mayor of Nigel from 1995 to 2000 and then served as Speaker of the Ekurhuleni Metropolitan Council from 2001 to 2008. In July 2008, she succeeded Duma Nkosi as Mayor of Ekurhuleni. She left the mayoral office in November 2010 when, shortly after her election as ANC Provincial Treasurer in Gauteng, she was appointed to the Executive Council of Premier Nomvula Mokonyane. She served as MEC for Social Development and Health from 2010 to 2012 and MEC for Local Government and Housing from 2012 to 2014. She was elected Speaker in the Gauteng legislature after the 2014 general election and was re-elected in 2019.

== Early life and education ==
Lentheng Helen "Ntombi" Mekgwe was born in Chatterston near Nigel on the East Rand of what is now Gauteng province. While she was a child, as part of the apartheid-era programme of forced removals, her family was moved to the township of Duduza. Her mother, Ntombizodwa Molefe, was a nurse. For a period, Mekgwe attended Nkomazi High School in Komatipoort on the Eastern Transvaal, but she matriculated in 1987 at a school closer to Duduza. In the early 1980s, she joined the anti-apartheid Congress of South African Students and was also a founding member of the Duduza Youth Congress, an affiliate of the South African Youth Congress.

Mekgwe has a Bachelor of Administration degree, an Honours degree, and several tertiary certificates and diplomas; as of 2020, she was pursuing a Master's degree in public administration.

== Career in local government ==
After the South African government unbanned various anti-apartheid organisations in 1990, Mekgwe joined the African National Congress (ANC), the ANC Youth League, and the ANC Women's League. After the end of apartheid in 1994, she served from 1995 to 2000 as Mayor of Nigel, then led by a transitional local council. When the City of Ekurhuleni Metropolitan Municipality was established in the East Rand, merging other municipalities with Nigel, Mekgwe was elected as a ward councillor and as Speaker of the Ekurhuleni Metropolitan Council; she held both positions from 2001 until July 2008, having been re-elected in 2006. Simultaneously, she rose through the ranks of regional structures of the ANC in Ekurhuleni, ultimately becoming ANC Women's League Regional Secretary and ANC Regional Chairperson.

Duma Nkosi, the longstanding and increasingly embattled Mayor of Ekurhuleni, resigned from his position in late June 2008. The Independent said that Mekgwe was a frontrunner in the race to replace him, although other possible contenders included Panyaza Lesufi, Vulindlela Mapekula, and Chief Whip Moses Maseko. On 4 July, the ANC announced that it had accepted Nkosi's resignation and that Mekgwe would take over in an acting capacity until the council formally elected her to succeed Nkosi. She was elected Mayor of Ekurhuleni on 15 July 2008, receiving 109 votes against eight to the opposition candidate Izak Berg.

== Career in provincial government ==
=== ANC Provincial Treasurer: 2010–2018 ===
At a party elective conference in May 2010, Mekgwe was elected Provincial Treasurer of the ANC's Gauteng branch, serving under ANC Provincial Chairperson Paul Mashatile. Her candidacy was viewed as part of an informal slate of candidates aligned to Mashatile. News24 said that Mekgwe played "a critical role" at the conference in helping Mashatile to defeat a challenge to his incumbency by Nomvula Mokonyane, then the Premier of Gauteng. In October 2014, Mekgwe was re-elected to another four-year term in the powerful ANC treasury office, and she served until July 2018, when she was succeeded by Parks Tau and became an ordinary member of the Gauteng ANC's Provincial Executive Committee.

=== Gauteng Executive Council: 2010–2014 ===
On 2 November 2010, Mokonyane, in her capacity as a Premier, appointed Mekgwe to the Executive Council of Gauteng as part of a reshuffle of the Gauteng provincial government. Mekgwe succeeded Qedani Mahlangu as Member of the Executive Council (MEC) for Social Development and Health. She was sworn into the Gauteng Provincial Legislature to take up the position, and Mondli Gungubele replaced her as Mayor of Ekurhuleni.

Mekgwe was appointed to the Executive Council at the same time as Lebogang Maile and Humphrey Mmemezi, two other politicians also viewed as "long-time loyalists" of Paul Mashatile; it was widely believed that Mashatile's allies had forced Mokonyane to make the appointments following her defeat by Mashatile in the internal ANC elections in May. Mekgwe served in the Social Development and Health portfolio for less than two years; on 16 July 2012, Mokonyane announced another reshuffle in which Mekgwe replaced Mmemezi as MEC for Local Government and Housing.

=== Gauteng Speaker: 2014–2022 ===
In the 2014 general election, Mekgwe was re-elected to a seat in the Gauteng Provincial Legislature, and, with David Makhura and Barbara Creecy, she was also one of three candidates nominated by the Gauteng ANC to succeed Mokonyane as Premier of Gauteng. The provincial party nominated her when its initial nominee, Mandla Nkomfe, asked to be withdrawn from consideration. Sources told the Mail & Guardian that the ANC National Executive Committee had selected Mekgwe for election as Premier: according to the newspaper, Makhura was the preferred candidate of the Mashatile-led Gauteng ANC, but Mekgwe was viewed as "a welcome compromise because of the good relationship she enjoys with top provincial leaders". However, Makhura, not Mekgwe, was ultimately appointed Premier, and Mekgwe was not appointed to his new Executive Council.

Instead, Mekgwe was elected Speaker of the Gauteng Provincial Legislature. Following the 2019 general election, she was re-elected both to her legislative seat and to the Speaker's office. In addition, in November 2021, she was elected to a three-year term as the Treasurer for the Africa region of the Commonwealth Parliamentary Association.

== Personal life ==
As of 2008, Mekgwe was a single mother of two children. In 2015 she still lived in her hometown, Duduza.
