= Mthimkhulu =

Mthimkhulu is a surname. Notable people with the name include:

- Dumezweni Mthimkhulu, Motswana politician
- King Mthimkhulu II, (c. 1778–1819), King of AmaHlubi
- Mtholephi Mthimkhulu (1958–2015), South African politician
- Nelisiwe Mbatha-Mthimkhulu, South African politician
