= Lulu Johnson (politician) =

South African politician (born 1964)

Member of the National Assembly
- In office 23 April 2004 – 7 May 2019

President of the African National Congress Youth League
- In office 1994–1996
- Deputy: Bheki Nkosi
- Preceded by: Peter Mokaba
- Succeeded by: Malusi Gigaba

Personal details
- Born: Mlungisi Johnson; 5 February 1964 (age 62) Keiskammahoek; Cape Province, South Africa
- Party: African National Congress

Mlungisi "Lulu" Johnson (born 5 February 1964) is a South African politician who represented the African National Congress (ANC) in the National Assembly from 2004 to 2019. He served as President of the ANC Youth League from 1994 to 1996 and was the President of the Congress of South African Students during apartheid from 1983 to 1985. He also served on the ANC National Executive Committee from 1994 to 1997.

During his three terms in Parliament, Johnson chaired the Portfolio Committee on Agriculture, Forestry and Fisheries and Portfolio Committee on Water and Sanitation. He left his seat after the 2019 general election, in which the ANC controversially declined to nominate him for re-election.

== Early life and activism ==
Johnson was born on 5 February 1964 in Keiskammahoek and grew up in New Brighton outside Port Elizabeth in the former Cape Province. His mother, Nofezile Miriam Johnson, died in 2020.

Come of age at the height of apartheid, Johnson was active in the Young Christian Workers and the Congress of South African Students (COSAS). He served as national president of COSAS from 1983 until the organisation was banned by the government in 1985. He was subsequently detained by police during the 1986 state of emergency and was held without trial in the Eastern Cape until April 1989, when he was released after participating in a nationwide hunger strike by political prisoners.

== ANC Youth League president: 1994–1996 ==
In early 1994, shortly before South Africa's first post-apartheid elections, Johnson was elected as President of the ANC Youth League (ANCYL). He succeeded Peter Mokaba, who was over the age of 35 and therefore ineligible to run for re-election. Serving alongside Johnson were Bheki Nkosi as his deputy, Mpho Lekgoro as Secretary-General with Febe Potgieter as deputy, and Nash Jacobs as Treasurer-General. Although Johnson's ANCYL presidency entitled him to ex officio membership of the ANC National Executive Committee, he was also elected to a three-year term on the committee by delegates to the party's 49th National Conference in December 1994.

In the Mail & Guardian's phrase, Johnson "seemed to preside over a decline in the league's power". Although the ANCYL maintained its traditional populist stance – including by supporting the increasingly beleaguered Winnie Madikizela-Mandela – it was weakened by factional disputes and its membership declined to about 150,000 active members by 1996. Johnson served only one term as ANCYL President: at the league's next national elective conference in March 1996, he did not stand for re-election and was succeeded by Malusi Gigaba.

== Parliament: 2004–2019 ==
After leaving the ANCYL, Johnson worked at FBC Fidelity Investment Bank. In the 2004 general election, he was elected to an ANC seat in the National Assembly, representing the Eastern Cape constituency. He ultimately served three terms in the National Assembly, gaining re-election in 2009 and 2014 on the ANC's national list.

His bid to gain election to the ANC National Executive Committee in 2007 was unsuccessful, but the ANC nominated him to chair the Portfolio Committee on Agriculture, Forestry and Fisheries during his second term from 2009 to 2014. Nonetheless, in 2011, the Mail & Guardian observed that he had been "cast out into political obscurity, if not oblivion".

During his third term in Parliament, from 2014 to 2019, Johnson chaired the Portfolio Committee on Water and Sanitation. Ahead of the 2019 general election, the ANC did not list him for election to any legislative position, leading to complaints from the ANC Youth League. However, Johnson was serene about leaving Parliament:

These things happen to the best of us. There is no guaranteed position at the ANC except for the president. The emotions at some point were there but they went away. You have to live as a human being. I have a mother that I must look after. I have five children that I must bring back together. I am out.

In 2022, ahead of the ANC's 55th National Conference, Johnson was not nominated to stand for the ANC National Executive Committee and became one of 16 complainants who signed a letter objecting to the party's internal nominations process. He later distanced himself from the letter.
