= Nkululeko Dunga =

South African politician (born 1988)

Nkululeko Dunga MPL
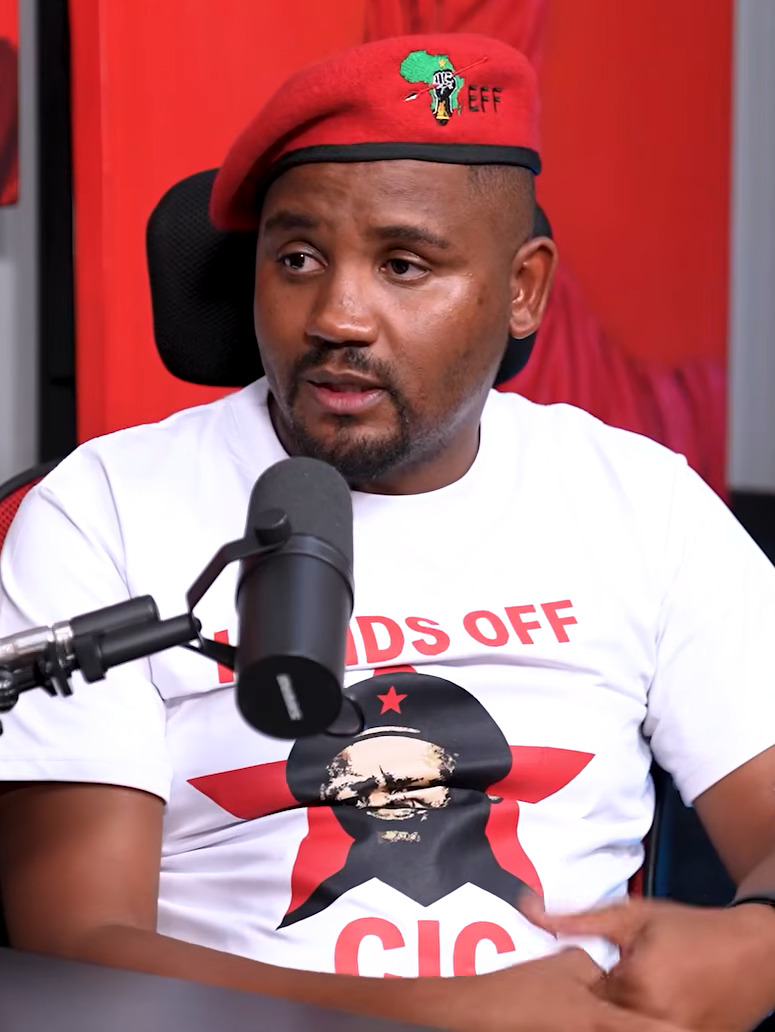
- Dunga in 2026

Member of the Executive Council of Gauteng for Finance
- Incumbent
- Assumed office 2 April 2026
- Premier: Panyaza Lesufi
- Preceded by: Lebogang Maile

Member of the Gauteng Provincial Legislature
- Incumbent
- Assumed office 31 March 2026

Provincial Chairperson of the Economic Freedom Fighters in Gauteng
- Incumbent
- Assumed office 10 September 2022
- Preceded by: Itani Mukwevho

Personal details
- Born: 23 August 1988 (age 38)
- Party: Economic Freedom Fighters

Nkululeko Dunga (born 23 August 1988) is a South African politician who has been the Member of the Executive Council of Gauteng for Finance since April 2026. The provincial chairperson of the Economic Freedom Fighters, Dunga joined the Gauteng Provincial Legislature in March 2026. Dunga had previously served as a councillor in the City of Ekurhuleni Metropolitan Municipality, where he served as the Member of the Mayoral Committee for Finance from 2023 until 2024.

== Political career ==
A member of the Economic Freedom Fighters, Dunga was elected a proportional representation (PR) councillor in the City of Ekurhuleni Metropolitan Municipality in the 2021 local government election. He served as the EFF's caucus leader as well as the chairperson of the Municipal Public Accounts Committee in the metro. In September 2022, Dunga was elected unopposed as the provincial chairperson of the Economic Freedom Fighters in Gauteng, succeeding Itani Mukwevho.

As part of coalition agreement between the EFF and the African National Congress, Dunga was sworn in as the Member of the Mayoral Committee for Finance on 6 April 2023, following his appointment by Mayor Sivuyile Ngodwana from the African Independent Congress. Ngodwana was removed as mayor in March 2024 and succeeded by the ANC's Doctor Xhakaza in April 2024; Dunga was reappointed as the MMC for Finance by Xhakaza. Less than two months, on 12 June 2024, Xhakaza dismissed Dunga as Finance MMC, citing "unforeseen misalignments."

=== Provincial government: 2026–present ===
On 31 March 2026, Dunga was sworn in as a member of the Gauteng Provincial Legislature for the EFF. Media outlets, Independent Online and the Mail & Guardian, reported on 1 April 2026 that the EFF and ANC had reached a coalition agreement and that Dunga's appointment to the provincial executive council was imminent. Gauteng premier Panyaza Lesufi announced during a press conference later that day that the EFF had joined the provincial government; he subsequently reshuffled his executive council, which saw Dunga appointed as the Member of the Executive Council for Finance. He was sworn in the following day.
