= Ismail Vadi =

South African politician (born 1960)

Member of the Gauteng Executive Council for Transport
- In office May 2014 – May 2019
- Premier: David Makhura
- Preceded by: Himself (for Roads and Transport)
- Succeeded by: Jacob Mamabolo (for Public Transport and Road Infrastructure)

Member of the Gauteng Executive Council for Roads and Transport
- In office November 2010 – May 2014
- Premier: Nomvula Mokonyane
- Preceded by: Bheki Nkosi
- Succeeded by: Himself (for Transport)

Personal details
- Born: 1960 (age 65–66) Kliptown, Transvaal; Union of South Africa
- Party: African National Congress
- Education: Wits University

Ismail Vadi (born 1960) is a South African politician who was Gauteng's Member of the Executive Council for Transport from 2010 to 2019. Before that, from 1994 to 2010, he represented the African National Congress in the National Assembly.

== Early life and activism ==
Vadi was born in 1960 in Kliptown outside Johannesburg in the former Transvaal, now part of Gauteng province. His family was forcibly removed to Lenasia, a township in the Transvaal designated for Indians under the apartheid system. He matriculated in 1976 at Trinity Secondary School in Lenasia and enrolled at Wits University, where he studied for a Master of Arts degree in history. He taught history and english in Lenasia from 1982 to 1991 and then worked at Wits as an education lecturer for three years. During the same period, he was active in the anti-apartheid struggle through the Transvaal Indian Congress and the United Democratic Front; he was also national vice president of the South African Democratic Teachers' Union from 1990 to 1994.

== Political career ==
In South Africa's first democratic elections in 1994, Vadi was elected to a seat in the National Assembly, the lower house of the new Parliament of South Africa. In 2010, his political party, the African National Congress (ANC), "redeployed" him from Parliament to the Gauteng Provincial Legislature; and on 2 November 2010, Nomvula Mokonyane, then the Premier of Gauteng, appointed him to the Gauteng Executive Council as Member of the Executive Council (MEC) for Roads and Transport. In the 2014 general election, he was re-elected to his legislative seat, ranked 14th on the ANC's provincial party list, and on 23 May, he was reappointed to the Executive Council of Mokonyane's successor, David Makhura, as MEC for Transport.

He remained MEC for Transport until the 2019 general election, when he was ranked 42nd on the ANC's party list and lost his seat in the provincial legislature. Vadi subsequently retired from frontline politics and joined the University of Johannesburg as a research associate. He published his memoirs as The Political Backbencher in 2021.

== Personal life ==
Vadi is Sufi Muslim.
