= Post and Telecommunication Workers' Association =

Trade union in South Africa

- Formation: 1986
- Dissolved: 1996
- Location: South Africa

The Post and Telecommunication Workers' Association (POTWA) was a trade union representing workers in the communications industry in South Africa.

The union was founded in January 1986 in Soweto, led by Khabisi Mosunkutu. It had 10,000 members by the end of the year, and soon affiliated to the Congress of South African Trade Unions. By 1993, it had grown to 23,081 members.

In May 1996, it merged with the Post Office Employees' Association, and the South African Post Telecommunication Employees' Association, to form the Communication Workers Union.
