= Bandile Masuku =

South African medical doctor and politician (born 1975)

Bandile Masuku MPL
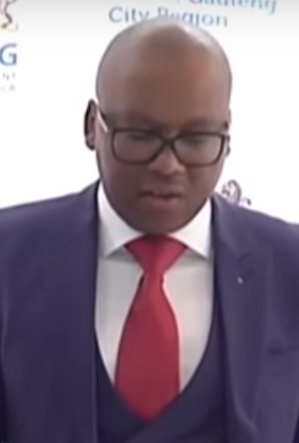
- Masuku in May 2019

Gauteng MEC for Health
- In office 30 May 2019 – 9 October 2020
- Premier: David Makhura
- Preceded by: Gwen Ramokgopa
- Succeeded by: Nomathemba Mokgethi

Member of the Gauteng Provincial Legislature
- Incumbent
- Assumed office 22 May 2019

Personal details
- Born: Bandile Edgar Wallace Masuku; 2 November 1975 (age 50) Chris Hani Baragwanath Hospital, Transvaal Province, South Africa
- Party: African National Congress
- Spouse: Loyiso
- Children: 3
- Profession: Politician; Medical Doctor

Bandile Edgar Wallace Masuku (born 2 November 1975) is a South African medical doctor and politician serving as a Member of the Gauteng Provincial Legislature since May 2019. He was the Gauteng MEC for Health from May 2019 to October 2020. Masuku is a party member of the African National Congress (ANC).

== Life and career ==
Bandile Masuku was born in the Chris Hani Baragwanath Hospital in Soweto in the now-dissolved Transvaal Province. He grew up in Soweto and was expelled from school. While he was attending the Sekano-Ntoane Secondary School, Masuku became involved with youth activism. He joined the Congress of South African Students (Cosas). He had to repeat matric in 1992, after not succeeding in 1991.

In 1994, he began studying at the Sefako Makgatho Health Sciences University for a BSc. He registered for a degree in medicine in 1998 and fulfilled the degree in 2004 after he had to repeat a year. He was President of the university's SRC (Student Representative Council). He was elected to the national executive committee of the South African Students Congress in 2002. He served as SASCO National President elected at Fort Hare University in 2003. are

Masuku was appointed spokesperson of the African National Congress Youth League (ANCYL) in 2013.

Masuku had worked at multiple hospitals, including the Charlotte Maxeke Johannesburg Academic Hospital, the Chris Hani Baragwanath Hospital and the Pholosong Hospital. He specialised in obstetrics and gynaecology. Prior to his appointment to the Gauteng provincial government, he served as the head of clinical unit of the obstetrics and gynaecology at the Thelle Mohoerane Regional Hospital in Vosloorus on the East Rand of Gauteng.

In 2019, Masuku met up with Assistant Director of the Gauteng Medical Supply Depot, Neels Beukes to establish how the depot operates. He concluded it was working in 100% condition

== Gauteng provincial government ==
Masuku took office as a Member of the Gauteng Provincial Legislature on 22 May 2019. Premier David Makhura appointed him to the post of Member of the Executive Council (MEC) for Health on 29 May. He was sworn into office on 30 May.

=== COVID-19 ===
On 19 July 2020, the Sunday Independent reported that between 30 March and 1 April 2020, the Gauteng Health Department awarded two contracts of up to R78 million and R47 million to Royal Bhaca Projects (RB), headed by disputed Amabhaca King Madzikane II Thandisizwe Diko, to supply personal protective equipment (PPE) to the department. These contracts were part of R2,2 billion tenders awarded by the provincial health department since March 2020. Diko is married to the presidential spokesperson Khusela Diko. On 26 July, the publication alleged that the Masukus and Dikos have a close relationship.

Masuku has denied any involvement in the awarding of the tenders. Diko has acknowledged that while his company has been awarded the tenders, it has not received any payment. His wife, Khusela, has taken a leave of absence. On 29 July, the ANC PEC resolved that Masuku and his wife should temporarily step aside while the ANC's Integrity Committee investigates the allegations. Makhura announced on 30 July that he had placed Masuku on leave for the next two to four weeks, pending the investigation, and named Jacob Mamabolo as his acting successor. On 9 October 2020, Makhura removed him from the Executive Council, after it was found that he failed to execute his functions as set out by the Constitution and the Public Finance Management Act (PFMA).

== Personal life ==
Masuku is married to Loyiso, an ANC municipal councillor in the City of Johannesburg Metropolitan Municipality and the municipality's MMC for Corporate and Shared Services. They have three sons and reside in Alberton, Gauteng.

Political offices
| Preceded by Gwen Ramokgopa | Gauteng MEC for Health; 2019–2020 | Succeeded by Nomathemba Mokgethi |
