= Communication Workers Union (South Africa) =

Trade union in South Africa

CWU
- Communication Workers Union
- Founded: 9 May 1996; 29 years ago
- Headquarters: 16 - 20 New Street South, Gandhi Square, Johannesburg, South Africa, 2001
- Location: South Africa
- Members: 44,000
- Key people: Wayne Bredenkamp (on behalf of 9 Provinces Interim Structure)
- Affiliations: COSATU
- Website: www.cwu.org.za

The Communication Workers Union (CWU) is a trade union representing ICT and postal workers in South Africa.

The union was founded in May 1996, when the Post and Telecommunication Workers' Association (POTWA) merged with two small staff associations: the Post Office Employees' Association, and the South African Post Telecommunication Employees' Association. Like POTWA, the union affiliated to the Congress of South African Trade Unions. While the leaders of POTWA were expected to win election to the leadership of the merged union, instead a rival slate of POTWA members won the initial elections, led by president Tlhalefang Sekano.

== General Secretaries ==
- 2003: Seleboho Kiti
- 2006: Macvicar Dyasopu (acting)
- 2007: Gallant Roberts
- 2012: Thabo Mokgalane (acting)
- 2014: Aubrey Tshabalala (Interdicted)
- 2018: VACANT
- 2025: 9 Provinces Structure
