= Humphrey Mmemezi =

South African politician (born 1955)

Member of the National Assembly
- In office 7 March 2023 – 28 May 2024
- In office 21 May 2014 – 7 May 2019
- President: Jacob Zuma

Member of the Gauteng Executive Council for Local Government and Housing
- In office 2 November 2010 – 11 July 2012
- Premier: Nomvula Mokonyane
- Preceded by: Kgaogelo Lekgoro
- Succeeded by: Ntombi Mekgwe

Deputy Provincial Secretary of the Gauteng ANC
- In office May 2010 – October 2014
- Secretary: David Makhura
- Chairperson: Paul Mashatile
- Preceded by: Mandla Nkomfe
- Succeeded by: Gwen Ramokgopa

Personal details
- Born: 26 February 1955 (age 71) Buthulo, Cape province Union of South Africa
- Party: African National Congress

Humphrey Mmemezi (born 26 February 1955) is a South African politician and civil servant who most recently served as a Member of the National Assembly from March 2023 until May 2024. He previously served in the National Assembly between 2014 and 2019 and served as Chairperson of the Portfolio Committee on Public Works from 2017. He was formerly a Member of the Executive Council for Local Government and Housing in the Gauteng provincial government from 2010 to 2012. He resigned from the provincial government in July 2012 when he was found guilty of contravening the legislature's code of conduct and ethics, including in using his government credit card for personal expenses.

== Early life and career ==
Humphrey Mdumzeli Zondelele Mmemezi was born on 26 February 1955 in the village of Buthulo near Lusikisiki in what is now South Africa's Eastern Cape province. After the end of apartheid in 1994, he became an active member of local structures of the governing African National Congress (ANC) in the West Rand region of the new Gauteng province. He was elected a local councillor in the West Rand District Municipality, but resigned in mid-2008 to take up a job at Gauteng's Mogale City Local Municipality, where he was appointed as head of human resources.

Months after his appointment to the municipality, in November 2008, four women who worked under him reported to the media, the municipality, and the Krugersdorp police that Mmemezi had sexually harassed them at work. In August 2009, he was acquitted of sexual harassment in the Krugersdorp magistrate's court; in a move criticised by the South African Municipal Union, the four women were later subjected to a disciplinary hearing, charged with bringing the municipality into disrepute.

== Provincial political career ==
=== ANC Deputy Provincial Secretary: 2010–2014 ===
While working at Mogale municipality, Mmemezi remained active in the ANC. In May 2010, he was elected Deputy Provincial Secretary of the ANC's branch in Gauteng, in a contest against Lillian Nomvula and Jacob Khawe. He campaigned on an informal slate aligned to Paul Mashatile, who won re-election as Provincial Chairperson at the same party elective conference; according to News24, he "played a critical role" in securing Mashatile's re-election. He held his party office until October 2014, when he was succeeded by Gwen Ramokgopa, and he deputised longstanding Provincial Secretary David Makhura.

=== Gauteng Executive Council: 2010–2012 ===
On 2 November 2010, the Premier of Gauteng, Nomvula Mokonyane, announced a cabinet reshuffle in which Mmemezi was appointed Member of the Executive Council (MEC) for Local Government and Housing in the Gauteng provincial government. He was appointed alongside Ntombi Mekgwe and Lebogang Maile, who were also considered allies of Paul Mashatile, and it was widely believed that the provincial ANC under Mashatile's leadership had forced Mokonyane to make the appointments. Mmemezi was sworn into the Gauteng Provincial Legislature in order to take up the position.

==== Misconduct ====
While in the provincial government, Mmemezi was at the centre of several scandals pertaining to alleged misconduct. In particular, two incidents were investigated by the government's integrity commission. First, in November 2011, Mmemezi's official car, a BMW X5, hit a teenager on a motorbike, severely injuring him. The driver of the vehicle was ultimately convicted of reckless or negligent driving, with a court finding that the collision occurred after the driver ran a red light while taking Mmemezi to a meeting. The opposition Democratic Alliance alleged that Mmemezi had subsequently lied to the government about the extent of the damage to the official car. The integrity committee investigation ultimately gave some credence to this allegation, reporting that Mmemezi had "at the very least, been very economic with the truth surrounding his involvement in an accident and the subsequent action which took place... He has misled the legislature and the office of the IC [integrity commission] and may have tried to cover up the extent of damage to his official vehicle."

Then, in May 2012, the Star reported that Mmemezi had used his government credit card to make several personal purchases, including purchases costing over R50,000 during a visit to India in September 2011. In addition, the newspaper alleged that he had spent R10,000 on an art work and then had disguised the transaction as the purchase of McDonald's hamburgers worth R10,000. Confronted about this by a journalist, he responded, "Am I such a bad MEC that I must not have a painting in the office? Is it a crime to buy an artistic work?" The integrity committee later found Mmemezi had used his government credit card for personal use and that it "amounted to an act of negligence".

==== Resignation ====
On 2 July, while the integrity commission investigation was nearing completion, sources told the Star that Premier Mokonyane intended to fire Mmemezi when she returned from a government trip to China; her decision was reportedly supported by ANC Provincial Chairperson Paul Mashatile and ANC Provincial Secretary David Makhura. On 11 July, Mmemezi announced his resignation, which he said was "the most honourable thing to do under these circumstances". In a statement, he apologised for making personal purchases on his government credit card, saying that he had been under the impression that the personal expenses were permissible if he repaid them; however, he said that other allegations – including that he had not reported a car accident – were false.

On 13 July, the Gauteng Provincial Legislature received and unanimously adopted the report of the integrity committee, which found Mmemezi guilty of contravening the legislature's code of conduct and ethics. The legislature resolved that his resignation served as sufficient sanction, though Jack Bloom of the Democratic Alliance argued that other allegations against Mmemezi – pertaining to alleged maladministration while he worked at Mogale City municipality – should also be investigated. On 16 July, Premier Mokonyane announced that Ntombi Mekgwe would take over his portfolio in the Executive Council. Mmemezi retained his post as ANC Deputy Provincial Secretary, and he served the remainder of his term in his seat as an ordinary Member of the Provincial Legislature.

== National political career ==
=== ANC National Executive Committee: 2012–2017 ===
In November 2012, the Star reported that Kgosientso Ramokgopa, then the Mayor of Tshwane, had accused Mmemezi of buying votes in support of ANC President Jacob Zuma, who sought re-election at the ANC's upcoming 53rd National Conference. Ramokgopa reportedly made the accusation during an ANC Provincial Executive Committee meeting in late November. Both Mmemezi and Faith Mazibuko, whom Ramokgopa allegedly identified as Mmemezi's accomplice, denied involvement.

When the 53rd National Conference was held in Mangaung, Free State in December 2012, Mmemezi was elected to a five-year term on the ANC's National Executive Committee (NEC). According to the Sunday Times, as a member of the NEC Mmemezi advocated for the disbandment of the leadership corps of the Gauteng ANC, which was strongly anti-Zuma; in a 2016 NEC meeting, he reportedly described the provincial leadership as "ill-disciplined".

Mmemezi failed to gain re-election to the National Executive Committee at the next national ANC conference in December 2017, although his re-election bid was supported both by the ANC Women's League and by the Gauteng branch of the ANC.

=== National Assembly: 2014–2019 ===
In the 2014 general election, Mmemezi vacated his seat in the provincial legislature and secured election to a seat in the National Assembly, the lower house of the South African Parliament; he was ranked 111st on the ANC's party list. In October 2017, the Zuma-led ANC leadership instructed the party's parliamentary caucus to elect Mmemezi as Chairperson of the National Assembly's Portfolio Committee on Public Works, in which capacity he succeeded Ben Martins, who had become Deputy Minister of Public Enterprises earlier that year. During the next general election in 2019, Mmemezi was ranked 139th on the ANC's party list and was not re-elected to his seat in the legislature.

=== Return to the National Assembly: 2023–2024 ===
On 7 March 2023, Mmemezi was sworn in as a Member of the National Assembly, filling the casual vacancy that arose following the resignation of former Deputy President David Mabuza from parliament. Mmemezi did not stand in the 2024 general election and left parliament.
