= Nandi Mayathula-Khoza =

South African politician

Member of the Gauteng Executive Council for Social Development
- In office February 2016 – May 2019
- Premier: David Makhura
- Preceded by: Molebatsi Bopape
- Succeeded by: Thuliswa Nkabinde-Khawe

Member of the Gauteng Executive Council for Infrastructure Development
- In office May 2014 – February 2016
- Premier: David Makhura
- Preceded by: Qedani Mahlangu
- Succeeded by: Jacob Mamabolo

Member of the Gauteng Executive Council for Agriculture, Rural Development and Social Development
- In office June 2009 – 2012 (for Agriculture and Rural Development; 2012 – May 2014 (with Social Development)
- Premier: Nomvula Mokonyane
- Preceded by: Nomantu Nkomo-Ralehoko
- Succeeded by: Faith Mazibuko (for Agriculture, Environment, Rural Development and Social Development)

Personal details
- Born: Senaoane, Soweto; Transvaal, South Africa
- Party: African National Congress
- Education: Kwaluseni University; Wits University

Nandi Mayathula-Khoza is a South African politician who was a member of the Gauteng Executive Council from 2009 to 2019, most proximately as Member of the Executive Council for Social Development under Premier David Makhura from 2016 to 2019. She left the Gauteng Provincial Legislature in the 2019 general election and in 2021 was appointed chairperson of the board of South Africa's Central Drug Authority.

== Early life and education ==
Mayathula-Khoza was born and raised in Senaoane in Soweto in the former Transvaal, now part of Gauteng province. Her parents are Monica Mayathula, a school teacher, and Reverend Castro Mayathula, a Black Consciousness activist. She participated in the 1976 Soweto uprising and in 1977 went into exile in Swaziland. She finished high school in Swaziland and completed a Bachelor of Science at Kwaluseni University; she later received a Bachelor of Education from Wits University. In the late 1980s, after her parents died, she returned to South Africa, where she was involved in the anti-apartheid movement. She formally joined the African National Congress (ANC) after it was unbanned in the 1990s. She also worked as a teacher and then as a community development facilitator.

== Political career ==
When apartheid ended in 1994, Mayathula-Khoza was elected to represent the ANC as a councillor in Johannesburg. She was later elected as Mayor of Soweto in 1997 and as inaugural Speaker of the City of Johannesburg council in 2000. After that she remained a local councillor and was a Member of the Mayoral Committee in Johannesburg. She chaired the board of Rand Water for four years.

In early June 2009, Nomvula Mokonyane, then the Premier of Gauteng, appointed Mayathula-Khoza to the Gauteng Executive Council as Member of the Executive Council (MEC) for Agriculture and Rural Development; she succeeded Nomantu Nkomo-Ralehoko, who had resigned shortly after being appointed to the office in May following the 2009 general election. Mayathula-Khoza was MEC for Agriculture and Rural Development until the 2014 general election, with social development added to her portfolio from 2012.

Pursuant to the 2014 election, she was re-elected to her seat in the Gauteng Provincial Legislature, ranked 13th on the ANC's party list, and newly elected Premier David Makhura appointed her MEC for Infrastructure Development in his new Executive Council. On 2 February 2016, Makhura announced a reshuffle in which Mayathula-Khoza was moved to the social development portfolio.

Mayathula-Khoza did not seek re-election to the provincial legislature in the 2019 general election; she said that she intended to leave government to complete a Master's degree and establish a charitable foundation, although she remained active in her local ANC branch, Gauteng's Mzala branch. In May 2021, she was appointed chairperson of the board of the Central Drug Authority.

== Personal life ==
As of 2009, Mayathula-Khoza was married and had four children.
