= Jacob Mamabolo =

South African politician (born 1969)

Jacob Mamabolo MPL
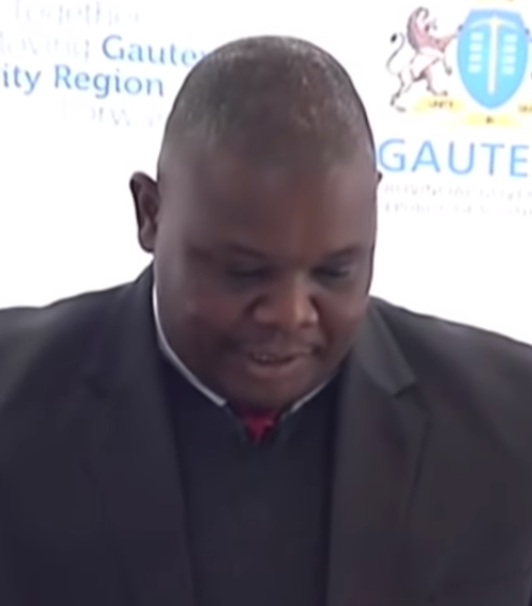
- Mamabolo in May 2019

Gauteng MEC for Infrastructure Development and Cooperative Governance and Traditional Affairs
- Incumbent
- Assumed office 3 July 2024
- Premier: Panyaza Lesufi
- Preceded by: Office established

Gauteng MEC for Finance
- In office 7 October 2022 – 14 June 2024
- Premier: Panyaza Lesufi
- Preceded by: Nomantu Nkomo-Ralehoko
- Succeeded by: Lebogang Maile

Gauteng MEC for Roads and Transport
- In office 30 May 2019 – 6 October 2022
- Premier: David Makhura
- Preceded by: Ismail Vadi
- Succeeded by: Kedibone Diale-Tlabela

Gauteng MEC for Infrastructure Development
- In office 2 February 2016 – 29 May 2019
- Premier: David Makhura
- Preceded by: Nandi Mayathula-Khoza
- Succeeded by: Tasneem Motara

Gauteng MEC for Human Settlement and COGTA
- In office 23 May 2014 – 2 February 2016
- Premier: David Makhura
- Preceded by: Ntombi Mekgwe
- Succeeded by: Paul Mashatile

Member of the Gauteng Provincial Legislature
- Incumbent
- Assumed office 21 May 2014

Personal details
- Born: Phalama Jacob Mamabolo; 10 March 1969 (age 57)
- Party: African National Congress

Phalama Jacob Mamabolo (born 10 March 1969) is a South African politician of the African National Congress. He was elected to the Gauteng Provincial Legislature in the 2014 election, and was appointed Member of the Executive Council (MEC) for Human Settlement and COGTA. He served in this position until his appointment as the MEC for Infrastructure Development in February 2016. Mamabolo became the MEC for Roads and Transport in 2019. In October 2022, Mamabolo was promoted to MEC for Finance. Following the 2024 provincial election, he was appointed MEC for Infrastructure Development and Cooperative Governance and Traditional Affairs.

He is the current provincial secretary of the South African Communist Party.

== Early life and education ==
Mamabolo was born on 10 March 1969. He has a senior diploma in teaching, a degree in law, and a master's degree in public administration. He is currently studying towards a Ph.D. in Public Administration at the University of South Africa.

== Career ==
=== Civil servant ===
Mamabolo worked as a civil servant for a decade. He was first employed as an Office Manager in the office of the then deputy minister of Correctional Services. He then worked at the Department of Home Affairs as a parliamentary liaison officer and was eventually promoted to Chief of Staff. Mamabolo was soon given the position of project manager of the Home Affairs Turn-Around Strategy.

Mamabolo was the head of the Home Affairs 2010 Soccer World Cup Project. He became the chief director responsible for ports of entry after that. Later on, he was employed as head of change management at the Department of Public Works.

=== Political career ===
Mamabolo became active in politics at a young age. He was a member of the student representative council (SRC) of the Mokopane Teachers College and the president of the South African Student Congress. He is currently a member of the provincial executive committee of the African National Congress in Gauteng. Mamabolo also serves as the provincial secretary of the South African Communist Party.

=== Provincial government ===
Mamabolo was elected to the Gauteng Provincial Legislature in 2014. On 23 May 2014, he was appointed Member of the Executive Council (MEC) for Human Settlement and COGTA by premier David Makhura. He became the MEC for Infrastructure Development in February 2016. Makhura made Mamabolo the MEC for Roads and Transport in 2019.

On 30 July 2020, Bandile Masuku, the MEC for Health, was placed on leave amid a personal protective equipment scandal. Mamabolo acted as MEC during Masuku's leave.

On 7 October 2022, Mamabolo was appointed as Finance MEC by newly elected premier Panyaza Lesufi. Lesufi tasked him with ensuring that the controversial e-tolls will be scrapped.

Following the 2024 provincial election, Mamabolo was appointed as the MEC for the newly established Infrastructure Development and Cooperative Governance and Traditional Affairs portfolio by premier Lesufi.
