= Gauteng Department of Education =

Department of Education in Gauteng

Department overview
- Formed: 1994
- Preceding Department: Transvaal Education Department
- Jurisdiction: Government of Gauteng
- Headquarters: 17 Simmonds Street, Marshalltown, Johannesburg, 2000
- Annual budget: R63.4 billion (2023)
- Member of the Executive Council responsible: Lebogang Maile
- Department executive: Rufus Mmutlana (Acting), Head of Department
- Website: education.gauteng.gov.za

The Gauteng Department of Education is a provincial government department under the Gauteng Provincial Government responsible for overseeing and regulating the basic education system in the Gauteng province of South Africa in accordance with the South African Schools Act of 1996. The department was established in 1994 to replace the education department of the dissolved Transvaal province.

The Department is administered by Member of the Executive Council (MEC) Matome Chiloane, while the current Acting Head of Department (HoD) is Rufus Mmutlana. In the fiscal year 2023/24, the Gauteng Department of Education was slated to receive a budget allocation of R63.4 billion to bolster the department's overarching mission of delivering high-quality and readily accessible education within the province. Its official abbreviation is GDE.

More recently, the department has been criticised for not being able to accommodate the growing number of pupils in the province. It has attempted to use an online registration system, but, this too has been criticised.

For the 2018/2019 financial year, it received a financially unqualified audit and recorded irregular expenditure of over R1,2 billion. Irregular expenditure for the 2019/2020 financial year once again topped R1 billion, while R431 million was spent in three months to disinfect schools. The Democratic Alliance cited these expenses as proof that the department is unable to manage its finances.
