= Kedibone Diale-Tlabela =

South African politician (1979)

Kedibone Diale-Tlabela MPL

Member of the Gauteng Executive Council for Roads and Transport
- Incumbent
- Assumed office 3 July 2024
- Premier: Panyaza Lesufi
- Preceded by: Herself

Member of the Gauteng Executive Council for Transport and Logistics
- In office 7 October 2022 – 14 June 2024
- Premier: Panyaza Lesufi
- Preceded by: Office established (Jacob Mamabolo as MEC for Transport)
- Succeeded by: Herself

Member of the Gauteng Provincial Legislature
- Incumbent
- Assumed office 22 May 2019

Personal details
- Born: 14 November 1979 (age 46)
- Party: African National Congress
- Profession: Politician

Kedibone Pauline Diale-Tlabela (born 14 November 1979) is a South African politician. She was elected to the Gauteng Provincial Legislature in 2019 as a member of the African National Congress. In October 2022, she was appointed the Member of the Executive Council (MEC) responsible for Transport and Logistics before becoming the MEC for Roads and Transport in July 2024.

== Life and career ==
Diale-Tlabela was born in 1979. In her youth she was a member of the South African Students Congress and Evangelical Lutheran Church in Southern Africa. Before she joined frontline politics, she worked for thirteen years in various capacities at the City of Tshwane, including as the mayoral advisor on youth development.

At the ANC's provincial elective conference in June 2018, Diale-Tlabela was elected to the Provincial Executive Committee of the party's Gauteng branch. In the general election the following year, she was elected to the Gauteng Provincial Legislature, having been ranked 19th on the ANC's list. She was appointed chair of the Co-operative Governance & Traditional Affairs & Human Settlement Portfolio Committee upon her swearing in.

In June 2022, Diale-Tlabela was re-elected to the ANC Provincial Executive Committee as deputy provincial chairman Panyaza Lesufi was elected the party's provincial chairman. She also serves as a member of the party's Provincial Working Committee (PWC). After incumbent Gauteng premier David Makhura was recalled by the ANC, Diale was one of three names the Provincial Executive Committee recommended to the national ANC structure to succeed Makhura. Lesufi was ultimately selected to replace Makhura in October 2022. Following his election as premier, Lesufi announced his executive council which saw Diale-Tlabela appointed Member of the Executive Council (MEC) for Transport and Logistics. She was appointed MEC for Roads and Transport in July 2024.
