= Nelisiwe Mbatha =

South African politician

Member of the Gauteng Executive Council for Sport, Arts, Culture and Recreation
- In office May 2009 – November 2010
- Premier: Nomvula Mokonyane
- Preceded by: Barbara Creecy
- Succeeded by: Lebogang Maile

Personal details
- Born: Evaton, Transvaal; South Africa
- Party: African National Congress

Nelisiwe Prudence Mbatha, also known as Nelisiwe Moerane and formerly known as Nelisiwe Mbatha-Mthimkhulu, is a South African politician who was Gauteng's Member of the Executive Council for Sport, Arts, Culture and Recreation from May 2009 to November 2010. She is a member of the African National Congress (ANC).

== Career ==
Mbatha was born and raised in Evaton in present-day Gauteng province. As a high school student, she was active in anti-apartheid youth politics through the Congress of South African Students. She was a councillor at the now-defunct Lekoa Vaal Metropolitan Municipality from 1995 to 2000 and at Midvaal Local Municipality and Sedibeng District Municipality from 2000 to 2007. She was also the inaugural speaker of the council until 2007, when she left local government to join the Gauteng Provincial Legislature. She was also active in the ANC and ANC Women's League in the Sedibeng region.

On 8 May 2009, pursuant to the 2009 general election, newly elected Premier Nomvula Mokonyane announced that Mbatha would be included in the new Gauteng Executive Council as MEC for Sport, Arts, Culture and Recreation. Mbatha remained in that portfolio through the 2010 FIFA World Cup until 2 November 2010, when Mokonyane announced a major cabinet reshuffle in which she was removed from the Executive Council. She remained an ordinary Member of the Provincial Legislature. In the 2014 general election, Mbatha was listed 30th on the ANC's provincial party list and was not re-elected to her seat in the legislature. She subsequently pursued a career in the construction sector.

== Personal life ==
As of 2010, Mbatha was married to Solly Moerane of the South African Football Association, formerly of the South African Navy; she has children. In June 2010, there was a burglary and fire at Mbatha's house in Meyerton.
