= Nomathemba Mokgethi =

South African politician

Nomathemba Mokgethi MPL
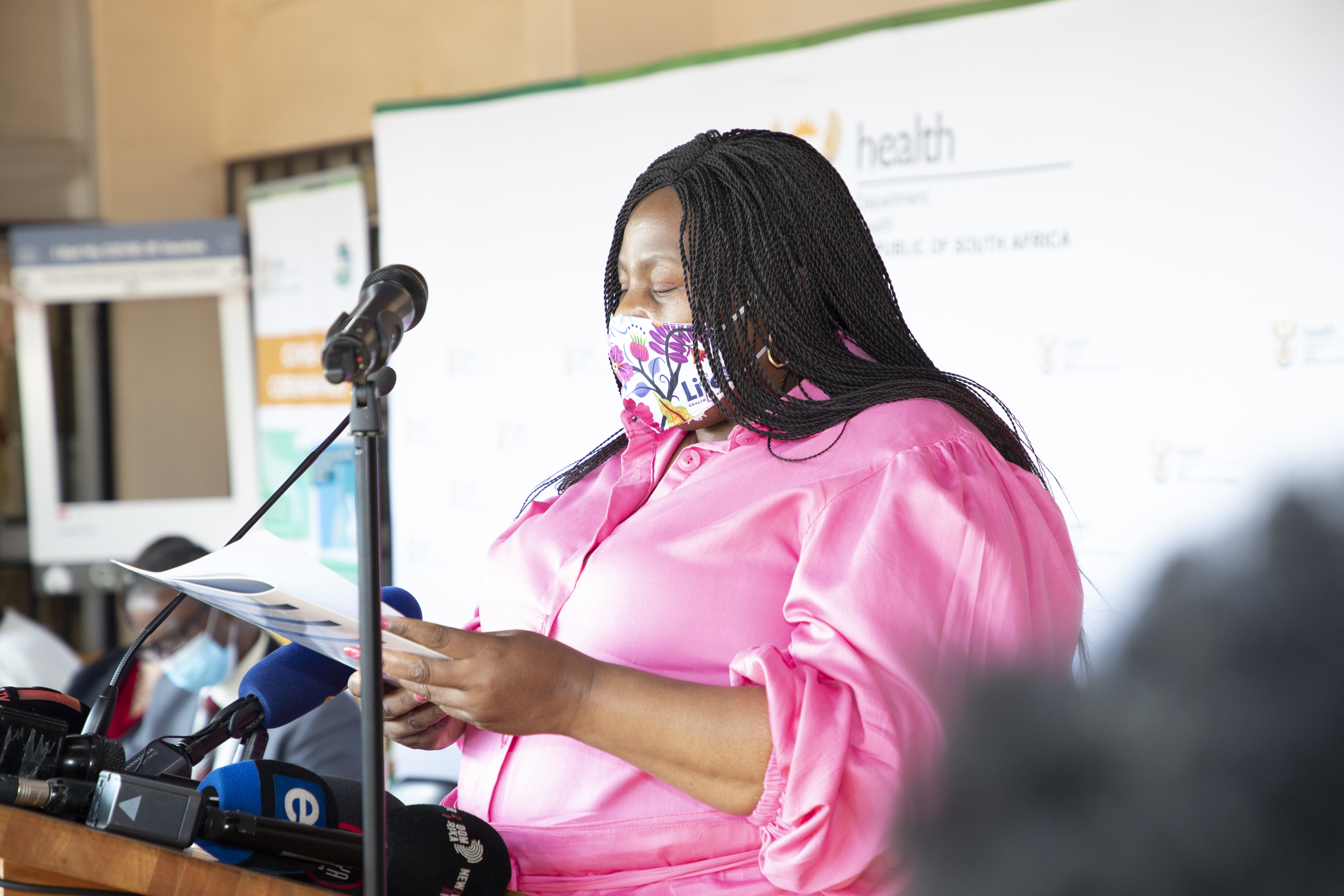

Gauteng MEC for Health
- In office 2 December 2020 – 7 October 2022
- Premier: David Makhura
- Preceded by: Bandile Masuku
- Succeeded by: Nomantu Nkomo-Ralehoko

Gauteng MEC for Social Development
- In office 19 June 2020 – 2 December 2020
- Premier: David Makhura
- Preceded by: Panyaza Lesufi (acting)
- Succeeded by: Morakane Mosupyoe

Member of the Gauteng Provincial Legislature
- Incumbent
- Assumed office 2018

Personal details
- Party: African National Congress
- Education: University of South Africa

Nomathemba Emily Mokgethi is a South African politician who served as the Gauteng Health MEC from 2020 to 2022 and has been a member of the Gauteng Provincial Legislature since 2018. She was the provincial MEC for Social Development between June and December 2020. Mokgethi is a member of the African National Congress.

== Early life and education ==
Mokgethi was born in the Transvaal Province. She holds a Master of Arts in Nursing Science and a doctorate in literature and philosophy from the University of South Africa.

== Career ==
Mokgethi worked as an official at the Merafong City Local Municipality in Gauteng. She was the acting municipal manager in the municipality before her appointment as the municipal manager at the Tlokwe Local Municipality in the North West in 2014. After the 2016 local government elections, the JB Marks Local Municipality was formed by the merging of the Tlokwe and Ventersdorp local municipalities. Mokgethi was appointed the municipal manager of the newly established municipality. In February 2018, she resigned from the position as she was sworn in as a Member of the Gauteng Provincial Legislature, representing the African National Congress.

Also in 2018, she was appointed to the Presidential Review Committee to contribute to the 25 Years since Democracy report.

In May 2019, Mokgethi was elected to a full term as a member of the provincial legislature. She was then made chairperson of the Co-operative Governance & Traditional Affairs, and Human Settlement committee. She was also appointed to serve on the Standing Committee on Public Accounts (SCOPA) and the standing committee of chair of chairs.

On 19 June 2020, Mokgethi was appointed as the Member of the Executive Council (MEC) responsible for the provincial department of Social Development. She took over from Panyaza Lesufi, who had acted in the position after the death of Thuliswa Nkabinde-Khawe in November 2019. She served in this position until December, when she was appointed as MEC for Health. Mokgethi was excluded from the Executive Council during a cabinet reshuffle done by the newly elected premier of Gauteng on 7 October 2022.

Mokgethi has also held senior leadership positions in the provincial structures of the ANC, the ANC Women's League and the tripartite alliance.
