= Trevor Fowler =

South African politician

Member of the Gauteng Executive Council for Development Planning and Local Government
- In office June 1999 – April 2004
- Premier: Mbhazima Shilowa
- Preceded by: Sicelo Shiceka
- Succeeded by: Qedani Mahlangu (for Local Government)

Personal details
- Born: Cape Town, Cape Province; South Africa
- Party: African National Congress

Trevor Fowler is a South African politician and public servant who served in the Gauteng Provincial Legislature from 1994 to 2004, first as the legislature's inaugural Speaker and then, from 1999, as Premier Mbhazima Shilowa's Member of the Executive Council for Development Planning and Local Government. After his departure from the provincial legislature, he was chief operations officer in the Presidency of South Africa from 2004 to 2009 and city manager of the City of Johannesburg from 2011 to 2016. He is a civil engineer by training and a member of the African National Congress.

== Life and career ==
Fowler was born in Cape Town and has a Bachelor of Science in civil engineering. During apartheid, he was a political exile in the United States, Canada, and Botswana. He returned to Cape Town in the early 1990s but shortly afterwards resettled in Johannesburg, then part of the Transvaal and now part of Gauteng province, where he worked in the construction sector until he entered frontline politics in 1994. Between 1994 and 2004, he was a Member of the Gauteng Provincial Legislature, and he served first as the inaugural Speaker of the provincial legislature and then, from 1999, as Member of the Executive Council for Development Planning and Local Government.

After the 2004 general election, Fowler left the Gauteng provincial legislature and Executive Council. He was initially appointed as political adviser to the Premier of Gauteng, Mbhazima Shilowa. However, later in 2004, he took up work as chief operations officer in the Presidency of South Africa. He held that position during the second term of President Thabo Mbeki and throughout the tenure of Mbeki's successor, Kgalema Motlanthe; he was also acting Director-General in the Presidency for much of Motlanthe's term, from November 2008 to June 2009. In late June 2009, shortly after the election of President Jacob Zuma, the Presidency announced that it and Fowler had "decided to part ways by mutual consent" from August so that Fowler could pursue his engineering career. Fowler went on to become an executive director at Murray & Roberts. In June 2011, the City of Johannesburg announced that he had been appointed to succeed Mavela Dlamini as city manager, with effect from 1 October that year. His five-year contract in that position was briefly extended and expired at the end of December 2016. On 1 April 2019, he began a five-year term as a commissioner at the Financial and Fiscal Commission of South Africa and served in this role until 31 March 2024.
