= David Quail =

South African politician and educator (1937–2026)

Member of the Gauteng Provincial Legislature
- In office 1999–2009

Personal details
- Born: 26 February 1937
- Died: 6 January 2026 (aged 88)
- Party: Democratic Alliance, Democratic Party

David Lockwood Quail (26 February 1937 – 6 January 2026) was a South African politician and educator who served as a Member of the Gauteng Provincial Legislature from 1999 until 2009, where he represented the Democratic Party and later the Democratic Alliance.

== Life and career ==
Quail qualified as a teacher. He was the headmaster of Jeppe High School for Boys in Kensington, Johannesburg for 20 years. In the 1999 provincial election, he was elected to the Gauteng Provincial Legislature as a member of the Democratic Party, which later became the Democratic Alliance in 2000. He was re-elected to the legislature in the 2004 provincial election. During his tenure in the legislature, he was the DA's spokesperson on education as well as the party's constituency head in Houghton. He left the provincial legislature in 2009 and retired from politics.

Quail died on 6 January 2026, at the age of 88. The DA provincial leader in Gauteng, Solly Msimanga, paid tribute to him.
