= Mary Metcalfe =

South African politician

Member of the Gauteng Executive Council for Agriculture, Conservation and Environment and Land Affairs
- In office June 1999 – April 2004
- Premier: Mbhazima Shilowa
- Preceded by: Nomvula Mokonyane (for Agriculture, Conservation and Environment)
- Succeeded by: Khabisi Mosunkutu (for Agriculture, Conservation and the Environment)

Member of the Gauteng Executive Council for Education
- In office 1994 – June 1999
- Premier: Tokyo Sexwale; Mathole Motshekga
- Preceded by: Position established
- Succeeded by: Ignatius Jacobs

Personal details
- Born: Mary Ellen Poole; 9 November 1954 (age 71) Bulawayo, Zimbabwe
- Party: African National Congress

Mary Metcalfe (née Poole; born 9 November 1954) is a South African politician, educator, and academic who served in the Executive Council of Gauteng from 1994 to 2004. A member of the African National Congress, she was Gauteng's inaugural Member of the Executive Council (MEC) for Education from 1994 to 1999 and then became MEC for Agriculture, Conservation and Environment and Land Affairs from 1999 to 2004. She also served as Deputy Speaker of the Gauteng Provincial Legislature in 2004. In 2021, she was appointed to the National Planning Commission.

== Life and career ==
Metcalfe was born on 9 November 1954 in Bulawayo, Zimbabwe. In 1978, she moved to Johannesburg, South Africa, where she obtained her master's degree at Wits University and taught remedial education, including at Wits from 1986 to 1994. She became active in the African National Congress (ANC) in the 1990s.

In South Africa's first democratic elections in 1994, Metcalfe was elected as a Member of the Gauteng Provincial Legislature, and Tokyo Sexwale, the inaugural Premier of Gauteng, appointed her to the Gauteng Executive Council as MEC for Education. She served in that position until after the 1999 general election, when newly elected Premier Mbhazima Shilowa appointed her MEC for Agriculture, Conservation and Environment and Land Affairs. In May 2004, following the 2004 general election, she was not reappointed to the Executive Council but became Deputy Speaker of the Gauteng Provincial Legislature. After a brief stint in that office, she left frontline politics in early 2005.

In 2005, she joined Wits as the head of the university's School of Education. She remained there until 2009, when she was appointed Director-General in the Department of Higher Education and Training. In May 2011, she moved to the Development Bank of Southern Africa, before returning to academia at the University of Johannesburg. In 2018, she was appointed to a four-year term on the council of Umalusi, the public education standards board of South Africa, and in December 2021 she was appointed as a commissioner at the National Planning Commission under Chairperson Mondli Gungubele.

== Personal life ==
As of 1994, Metcalfe had two young children.
