= Kgaogelo Lekgoro =

South African politician and diplomat (born 1957)

Member of the Gauteng Executive Council for Local Government and Housing
- In office May 2009 – November 2010
- Premier: Nomvula Mokonyane
- Preceded by: Qedani Mahlangu (for Local Government); Nomvula Mokonyane (for Housing)
- Succeeded by: Humphrey Mmemezi

Member of the Gauteng Executive Council for Social Development
- In office March 2006 – May 2009
- Preceded by: Bob Mabaso
- Succeeded by: Qedani Mahlangu (for Health and Social Development)

Personal details
- Born: 11 October 1957 (age 68)
- Citizenship: South Africa
- Party: African National Congress

Mpetjane Kgaogelo Lekgoro (born 11 October 1957) is a South African politician and diplomat. Before his first appointment as South African Ambassador in 2013, he represented the African National Congress (ANC) in Parliament from 1994 to 2006 and as a Member of the Gauteng Executive Council from 2006 to 2010.

== Life and career ==
Lekgoro was born on 11 October 1957. During apartheid, he was a member of the United Democratic Front in the PWV region that later became Gauteng province. In the early 1990s, he was a member of the National Executive Committee of the ANC Youth League.

He was a Member of Parliament from 1994 to 2006 and from 2003 he chaired the National Assembly's Portfolio Committee on Communications. On 23 March 2006, Mbhazima Shilowa, then the Premier of Gauteng, appointed him as Gauteng's Member of the Executive Council (MEC) for Social Development; he succeeded Bob Mabaso, who had vacated the position earlier in 2006 amid a sexual harassment scandal. By that time he was also a member of the ANC's Provincial Executive Committee in Gauteng.

He served as MEC for Social Development until 2009, throughout the rest of Shilowa's term and the brief tenure of Shilowa's successor, Paul Mashatile. On 8 May 2009, pursuant to the 2009 general election, newly elected Premier Nomvula Mokonyane announced that Lekgoro would be MEC for Local Government and Housing in her new Executive Council. However, in a cabinet reshuffle announced on 2 November 2010, Mokonyane removed him from the Executive Council, appointing him instead as the head of the Gauteng Planning Commission in the Premier's office.

In 2013, President Jacob Zuma appointed Lekgoro to his first diplomatic posting as South Africa's Ambassador to the United Arab Emirates. He later served as the Ambassador to Vietnam.
