= Khabisi Mosunkutu =

South African politician (1950 - 2018)

Member of the Gauteng Provincial Legislature
- In office 1995 – July 2011

Member of the Gauteng Executive Council for Community Safety
- In office May 2009 – November 2010
- Premier: Nomvula Mokonyane
- Preceded by: Firoz Cachalia
- Succeeded by: Faith Mazibuko

Member of the Gauteng Executive Council for Agriculture, Conservation and the Environment
- In office April 2004 – May 2009
- Premier: Mbhazima Shilowa; Paul Mashatile
- Preceded by: Mary Metcalfe (for Agriculture, Conservation and Environment and Land Affairs)
- Succeeded by: Nomantu Nkomo-Ralehoko (for Agriculture and Rural Development)

Member of the Gauteng Executive Council for Transport and Public Works
- In office June 1999 – April 2004
- Premier: Mbhazima Shilowa
- Preceded by: Joyce Kgoali
- Succeeded by: Ignatius Jacobs (for Public Transport, Roads and Works)

Personal details
- Born: 11 October 1950
- Died: 24 December 2018 (aged 68) Johannesburg, Gauteng
- Citizenship: South Africa
- Party: African National Congress

Elias Khabisi Mosunkutu (11 October 1950 – 24 December 2018) was a South African politician who served in the Gauteng Executive Council from 1999 to 2010 and in the Gauteng Provincial Legislature from 1995 to 2011. He was a member of the African National Congress (ANC).

Before he joined the provincial legislature, Mosunkutu represented the ANC in Parliament from 1994 to 1995, and he was formerly an anti-apartheid activist in the Southern Transvaal, including as founding secretary-general and long-serving president of the Post and Telecommunication Workers' Association. He was Member of the Executive Council (MEC) for Transport and Public Works under Premier Mbhazima Shilowa from 1999 to 2004; MEC for Agriculture, Conservation and the Environment from under Shilowa and his successor, Paul Mashatile, from 2004 to 2009; and MEC for Community Safety under Nomvula Mokonyane from 2009 to 2010. He was fired by Mokonyane in November 2010 and resigned from the provincial legislature in July 2011.

== Early life and activism ==
Mosunkutu was born on 11 October 1950 and grew up in Pimville, Soweto in the former Transvaal, now part of Gauteng province. He matriculated at Musi High School and qualified as a telecommunications technician through the state technical college at the Department of Post and Telecommunications, where he went on to work. He was a founding member and inaugural secretary-general of the Post and Telecommunication Workers' Association (POTWA), the first trade union established to represent the department's employees. He subsequently served several terms, until 1994, as president of POTWA, which affiliated to the Congress of South African Trade Unions. He was also active in other anti-apartheid organisations, including the Soweto Civic Association, the United Democratic Front, and the internal underground of the African National Congress (ANC) and its military wing, Umkhonto weSizwe.

== Career in government ==
From 1994 to 1995, Mosunkutu represented the ANC in the first post-apartheid Parliament of South Africa. He left his seat in 1995 to join the Gauteng Provincial Legislature. He was first appointed to the Gauteng Executive Council in June 1999, after his re-election to the provincial legislature in the 1999 general election; Mbhazima Shilowa, then the Premier of Gauteng, appointed him Member of the Executive Council (MEC) for Transport and Public Works. In that portfolio, which he retained until the 2004 general election, Mosunkutu was known for his role in mediating the ongoing violence in the taxi industry; Mosunkuntu's hard-nosed strategy was to shut down any taxi rank affected by violence.

From April 2004 to May 2009, during Shilowa's second term and then during Paul Mashatile's brief tenure as Premier, Mosunkutu served as MEC for Agriculture, Conservation and the Environment. In May 2009, after his reelection in the 2009 general election, he was reappointed to the Executive Council by Mashatile's successor, Nomvula Mokonyane, who made him MEC for Community Safety. However, on 2 November 2010, Mokonyane announced a major cabinet reshuffle in which Mosunkutu was fired and replaced by Faith Mazibuko. According to the Sowetan, it was rumoured that Mosunkutu's dismissal was related to internal ANC politics, as Mosunkutu had supported a losing faction – aligned to Mokonyane, rather than to longtime ANC Provincial Chairperson Paul Mashatile – at the Gauteng ANC's provincial elective conference in May 2010. He retained his seat as an ordinary Member of the Provincial Legislature until July 2011, when he announced that he had resigned to attend to personal issues and "other matters".

== Personal life and death ==
Mosunkuntu was married to Nonqaba, whom he met in 1970, and had five children. Their house in Johannesburg South was damaged in a fire in July 2016.

In July 2018, he suffered a stroke, and he died on 24 December 2018 from related illness. On 3 January 2019, he received a special official provincial funeral at Zoe Bible Church in Pimville. Attendees included Amos Masondo, the former Mayor of Johannesburg; Mondli Gungubele, then the national Deputy Minister of Finance; Gauteng Premier David Makhura; and former Premier Paul Mashatile.
