= Bekizwe Nkosi =

South African politician (b. 1964)

Chairperson of the Joint Committee on Ethics and Members' Interests
- In office 11 September 2019 – 28 May 2024
- Preceded by: Humphrey Maxegwana

Member of the National Assembly
- In office 22 May 2019 – 28 May 2024
Provincial offices
Member of the Gauteng Provincial Legislature
In office 1997–2012
Member of the Gauteng Executive Council for Infrastructure Development
In office November 2010 – July 2012
Premier	Nomvula Mokonyane
Preceded by	Faith Mazibuko
Succeeded by	Qedani Mahlangu
Member of the Gauteng Executive Council for Roads and Transport
In office May 2009 – November 2010
Premier	Nomvula Mokonyane
Preceded by	Ignatius Jacobs (for Public Transport, Roads and Works)
Succeeded by	Ismail Vadi

Personal details
- Born: Bekizwe Simon Nkosi; 19 June 1964 (age 62)
- Party: African National Congress
- Education: University of South Africa (LLB, B.Proc); University of Pretoria (LLM)
- Occupation: Politician, attorney

Bekizwe Simon "Bheki" Nkosi (born 19 June 1964) is a South African politician who represented the African National Congress (ANC) as a Member of the National Assembly from 2019 until 2024. An attorney by training, he was formerly a Member of the Gauteng Provincial Legislature from 1997 to 2012 and he served on the Gauteng Executive Council from 2009 to 2012. He was the deputy president of the ANC Youth League from 1994 to 1996.

== Education ==
Nkosi has BProc and Bachelor of Laws degrees from the University of South Africa and a Master of Laws from the University of Pretoria.

== Political career ==
Nkosi is a member of the African National Congress (ANC). He served as the deputy president of the ANC Youth League from 1994 to 1996, under league president Lulu Johnson, and was a member of the party's Provincial Executive Committee in Gauteng from 1997 to 2000. He also served as secretary and chairperson of his regional ANC branch.

=== Gauteng Provincial Legislature ===
He represented the ANC in the Gauteng Provincial Legislature from 1997 to 2012. He also served as a Member of the Gauteng Executive Council from 2009 to 2012 under Nomvula Mokonyane, who was then the Premier of Gauteng. Mokonyane appointed Nkosi as Member of the Executive Council (MEC) for Roads and Transport after the 2009 general election, and moved him to the Infrastructure Development portfolio in a reshuffle announced on 2 November 2010. He remained MEC for Infrastructure Development until the next reshuffle in July 2012, when he was dropped from the Executive Council and instead appointed to head the Gauteng Gambling Board.

=== National Assembly ===
In the 2019 general election, Nkosi was elected to a seat in the National Assembly, ranked 67th on the ANC's national party list in the 2019 general elections. On 27 June 2019, he was assigned as a member of the Portfolio Committee on International Relations and Cooperation. On 11 September that year, he was also elected as co-chairperson of the Joint Committee on Ethics and Members' Interests, alongside Lydia Moshodi of the National Council of Provinces. In April 2021, he became a member of the Committee for Section 194 Enquiry, established to evaluate Busisiwe Mkhwebane's fitness to hold office as the Public Protector.
