= Nkosiphendule Kolisile =

South African politician

Nkosiphendule Kolisile (February 2, 1973 – July 20, 2013) was a South African politician. He was a Member of the Executive Council (MEC) of the province of Gauteng from 2012 until his death in 2013, in charge of economic development. Previously, he had been member of the Gauteng Provincial Legislature beginning in 2009. Kolisile had been a member of the ANC and had led the Gauteng South African Communist Party.

== Death ==
Kolisile died together with his driver and bodyguard in a traffic collision on July 20, 2013, at the age of 40, leaving behind a wife and five children.
