= Uhuru Moiloa =

South African politician (1958 or 1959 – 2025)

Member of the Gauteng Executive Council for Human Settlements and Local Government
- In office March 2018 – May 2019
- Premier: David Makhura
- Preceded by: Paul Mashatile
- Succeeded by: Lebogang Maile (for Human Settlements, Urban Planning, and Cooperative Governance and Traditional Affairs)

Member of the Gauteng Provincial Legislature
- In office 21 May 2014 – 7 May 2019

Personal details
- Born: 1958 or 1959
- Died: 29 August 2025 (aged 66) Johannesburg, South Africa
- Party: African National Congress

Dikgang "Uhuru" Moiloa (1958 or 1959 – 29 August 2025) was a South African politician who was Gauteng's Member of the Executive Council (MEC) for Local Government and Human Settlements from March 2018 to May 2019. He represented the African National Congress in the Gauteng Provincial Legislature from 1999 to 2019 and was the Deputy Speaker in the legislature from 2014 to 2018.

== Early life and activism ==
Moiloa grew up in Dinokana, a region in the former Transvaal which was part of the Bophuthatswana bantustan during apartheid until it was incorporated into the North West province after 1994. He attended Dinokana Secondary School and said that the turning point of his political life was a lecture given at the school by anti-apartheid activist Onkgopotse Tiro. Moiloa was active in a local students' association while in high school. In December 1977, in the aftermath of the 1976 Soweto uprising and Bophuthatswana's declaration of independence, he left Dinokana for Johannesburg in present-day Gauteng province.

He subsequently became active in the anti-apartheid movement, including as a founding member of the Congress of South African Students in 1979, and he was arrested and trialled by the apartheid government for participating in a march in honour of activist Solomon Mahlangu. After his release, in the 1980s, he joined the African National Congress (ANC) underground.

== Career in provincial government ==
Moiloa was first elected to the Gauteng Provincial Legislature in 1999. He chaired several of the legislature's committees and at one stage was Chairperson of Committees ("Chair of Chairs") in the legislature. Pursuant to the 2014 general election, he was re-elected to his legislative seat, ranked 24th on the ANC's provincial party list, and was also elected unopposed as Deputy Speaker of the Gauteng Provincial Legislature. In that capacity he deputised Ntombi Mekgwe. While in the legislature, Moiloa also rose through the ranks of the ANC's regional branch in the West Rand and then of its provincial branch in Gauteng. He was a member of the Gauteng ANC's Provincial Executive Committee from 2008 until 2018.

He left the Deputy Speaker's office in March 2018, when David Makhura, the Premier of Gauteng, appointed him to the Gauteng Executive Council as Member of the Executive Council (MEC) for Local Government and Human Settlements. He succeeded Paul Mashatile, who had been elected to a full-time party office as ANC Treasurer-General. Moiloa's early tenure in the Executive Council was marked by widespread service delivery protests related to housing shortages in Gauteng. He was responsible for the portfolio until the 2019 general election, when he did not stand for re-election to the provincial legislature and was succeeded as MEC by Lebogang Maile, who took over the reconfigured portfolio of Human Settlements, Urban Planning, and Cooperative Governance and Traditional Affairs. Instead, Moiloa ran for election to a seat in the National Assembly, ranked 182nd on the ANC's national party list. He was not elected to a seat.

== Death ==
Moiloa died from a suspected stroke at his home in Johannesburg on 29 August 2025, at the age of 66.
