= Ignatius Jacobs =

South African politician (1963–2020)

Member of the Gauteng Executive Council for Public Transport, Roads and Works
- In office 2004–2009
- Premier: Mbhazima Shilowa; Paul Mashatile
- Preceded by: Khabisi Mosunkutu (for Transport and Public Works)
- Succeeded by: Bheki Nkosi (for Roads and Transport)

Member of the Gauteng Executive Council for Education
- In office 1999–2004
- Premier: Mbhazima Shilowa
- Preceded by: Mary Metcalfe
- Succeeded by: Angie Motshekga

Personal details
- Born: 31 July 1963
- Died: 1 April 2020 (aged 56)
- Citizenship: South Africa
- Party: African National Congress
- Other political affiliations: South African Communist Party
- Nickname: Nash

Ignatius "Nash" Jacobs (31 July 1963 – 1 April 2020) was a South African politician and strategist who served in the Executive Council of Gauteng, including as Member of the Executive Council (MEC) for Education from 1999 to 2004 and as MEC for Public Transport, Roads and Works from 2004 to 2009. After he left the provincial legislature in 2009, he was the General Manager of his political party, the African National Congress, until 2017.

== Early life and activism ==
Jacobs was born on 31 July 1963. He grew up in Riverlea, a township near Langlaagte in the former Transvaal (now part of Gauteng province) that was designated for Coloureds under apartheid. According to one of his brothers, he was active in the anti-apartheid movement from 1980, including in the Azanian Students' Organisation. He also became an underground operative of Umkhonto weSizwe, the military wing of the African National Congress (ANC).

After the ANC was unbanned by the apartheid government in 1990, he served two terms as national Treasurer-General of the ANC Youth League, first under league President Peter Mokaba and then under Mokaba's successor, Lulu Johnson. He was also a member of the provincial leadership of the South African Communist Party in Gauteng.

== Provincial government ==
In South Africa's first post-apartheid elections in 1994, Jacobs was elected to the Gauteng Provincial Legislature. By 1999, he was a member of the Gauteng ANC's Provincial Executive Committee and the Member of the Executive Council (MEC) for Welfare and Population Development in the Gauteng provincial government. In June 1999, following Jacobs's re-election to his legislative seat in the 1999 general election, newly elected Premier Mbhazima Shilowa appointed him MEC for Education. He held that portfolio throughout Shilowa's first term in office, from 1999 to 2004, and then served as MEC for Public Transport, Roads and Works during Shilowa's second term from 2004 to 2008. He was retained in the latter position during Paul Mashatile's brief stint as Premier in 2008 to 2009. He and the head of his department were later investigated for alleged misconduct and corruption in the Department of Transport, Roads and Works, but the investigation did not find sufficient evidence to substantiate the allegations against Jacobs.

After the 2009 general election, Nomvula Mokonyane, who succeeded Mashatile as Premier, did not reappoint Jacobs to the Executive Council but instead made him her special advisor and head of a new Planning Commission to be established in her office. Also during this period, Jacobs was a member of the inaugural board of the Ahmed Kathrada Foundation, then chaired by Cyril Ramaphosa. According to journalist Ferial Haffajee, he left frontline provincial politics after falling out with former Premier Mashatile, who at the time was Provincial Chairperson of the ANC in Gauteng.

== Luthuli House ==
After he left provincial government, Jacobs worked full-time at Luthuli House, the ANC's headquarters in Johannesburg, as the party's general manager. In early 2017, he was implicated in a scandal about a covert "dirty tricks" campaign allegedly run by the ANC against opposition parties ahead of the 2016 local government elections. Although the ANC denied knowledge of the project, recordings were leaked of a meeting in which Jacobs appeared to discuss the project with its operatives, leading News24 to conclude that "the ANC or Jacobs – or both – lied about the extent of their involvement". Jacobs denied any impropriety. On 29 January, the Sunday Times reported that the ANC leadership had told Jacobs to resign from his position or face dismissal. In late February, he confirmed that he had left his position, as part of what his lawyer called "a settlement to part ways amicably".

== Personal life and death ==
He was married to Amelia, whom he met in primary school, and had three children and one grandchild born shortly before his death.

After he left Luthuli House in 2017, he contracted colon cancer. He died of related illness on 1 April 2020.
