= Thuliswa Nkabinde-Khawe =

South African politician (1973–2019)

Gauteng MEC for Social Development
- In office 30 May 2019 – 1 November 2019
- Premier: David Makhura
- Preceded by: Nandi Mayathula-Khoza
- Succeeded by: Panyaza Lesufi (acting)

Member of the Gauteng Provincial Legislature
- In office 6 May 2009 – 1 November 2019

Personal details
- Born: Thuliswa Winlove Nkabinde; 4 January 1973 Transvaal, South Africa
- Died: 1 November 2019 (aged 46) Mulbarton Hospital, Alberton, Gauteng, South Africa
- Party: African National Congress
- Spouse: Jacob Khawe
- Occupation: Member of the Provincial Legislature
- Profession: Politician

Thuliswa Winlove Nkabinde-Khawe (4 January 1973 – 1 November 2019) was a South African politician and a party member of the African National Congress (ANC). She was elected a Member of the Gauteng Provincial Legislature in May 2009 and was a long-serving member of the Social Development committee in the legislature, prior to her appointment as Gauteng MEC (Member of the Executive Council) for Social Development in May 2019. She was an MEC until her death just over five months later.

== Early life and career ==
Nkabinde-Khawe was born on 4 January 1973 in the now-dissolved Transvaal Province. She became involved in politics at a young age, joining ACTSTOP, a civic organisation, in the 1980s where she held multiple leadership positions. She was part of the formation of the South African National Civic Organisation (SANCO) and was a senior leader in the structure. She was SANCO's provincial secretary at the time of her death.

She took office as a Member of the Gauteng Provincial Legislature in May 2009 and became a member of numerous committees including the Standing Committee of Public Accounts (SCOPA), Public Transport and Social Development. She was designated as the head of the Public Transport Committee in August 2012. She was the head of the Social Development Committee for the fifth provincial legislature from 2014 to 2019.

In May 2019, Nkabinde-Khawe was named MEC for Social Development by Premier David Makhura. She succeeded Nandi Mayathula-Khoza and took office as an MEC on 30 May 2019. She held the post for just over five months.

== Death ==
Nkabinde-Khawe died on 1 November 2019 in the Mulbarton Hospital in Alberton, Gauteng. She died following a short illness. The Gauteng ANC said that her death "will leave void in social development sector". The opposition Democratic Alliance also sent their condolences to the family. She is survived by her husband, Jacob Khawe, a senior ANC politician in the province, and their six children. Panyaza Lesufi was named her acting successor. Nkabinde-Khawe received a category 1 provincial funeral that was held on 8 November 2019. She was buried at the Meyerton Cemetery in Meyerton.

Political offices
| Preceded by Nandi Mayathula-Khoza | Gauteng MEC for Social Development; 30 May 2019 – 1 November 2019 | Succeeded by Panyaza Lesufi (acting) |
