= Lebogang Maile =

South African politician (born 1979)

Lebogang Maile MPL

Gauteng MEC for Education and Sports, Arts, Culture and Recreation
- Incumbent
- Assumed office 1 April 2026
- Premier: Panyaza Lesufi
- Preceded by: Matome Chiloane

Gauteng MEC for Finance and Economic Development
- In office 3 July 2024 – 1 April 2026
- Premier: Panyaza Lesufi
- Preceded by: Office established
- Succeeded by: Nkululeko Dunga (as MEC for Finance)

Gauteng MEC for Human Settlements and Infrastructure Development
- In office 7 October 2022 – 14 June 2024
- Premier: Panyaza Lesufi
- Preceded by: Office established
- Succeeded by: Office abolished

Gauteng MEC for Human Settlements, Urban Planning and Cooperative Governance, Academic development and Traditional Affairs
- In office 30 May 2019 – 6 October 2022
- Premier: David Makhura
- Preceded by: Dikgang Moiloa (for Human Settlements and Local Government)
- Succeeded by: Office abolished

Gauteng MEC for Economic Development and Academic Development
- In office 23 May 2014 – 29 May 2019
- Premier: David Makhura
- Preceded by: Mxolisi Eric Xayiya
- Succeeded by: Kgosientso Ramokgopa

Gauteng MEC for Sports, Arts, Culture and Recreation
- In office 3 November 2010 – 22 May 2014
- Premier: Nomvula Mokonyane
- Preceded by: Nelisiwe Mbatha-Mthimkhulu
- Succeeded by: Molebatsi Bopape

Member of the Gauteng Provincial Legislature
- Incumbent
- Assumed office 6 May 2009

Personal details
- Born: Lebogang Isaac Maile; 26 December 1979 (age 46)
- Citizenship: South Africa
- Party: African National Congress
- Education: University of the Witwatersrand; University of South Africa (LLB)

Lebogang Isaac Maile (born 26 December 1979) is a South African politician currently serving as Gauteng's Member of the Executive Council (MEC) for Education and Sports, Arts, Culture and Recreation. A member of the African National Congress (ANC), he has served in the Gauteng Provincial Legislature since May 2009 and in the Gauteng Executive Council since 2010.

Maile is a former president of the Congress of South African Students and chaired the Gauteng branch of the ANC Youth League from 2010 to 2013. In subsequent years he held the portfolios of MEC for Sports, Arts, Culture and Recreation from November 2010 to May 2014; MEC for Economic Development from May 2014 to May 2019; and MEC for Human Settlements, Urban Planning and Cooperative Governance and Traditional Affairs from May 2019 until October 2022, when he was appointed MEC for Human Settlements and Infrastructure Development. In July 2024, he became the MEC for Finance and Economic Development. Maile was appointed MEC for Education and Sports, Arts, Culture and Recreation in April 2026.

== Early life and education ==
Maile was born on 26 December 1979. He grew up in Alexandra and matriculated at Crawford College in Johannesburg. His brother is Mike Maile. He obtained a tertiary certificate in intergovernmental relations and a diploma in public relations, and in April 2017 graduated from the University of the Witwatersrand with a certificate in leadership and governance. In October 2023, Maile was conferred with a Bachelor of Laws (LLB) from the University of South Africa.

== Political career ==
From 1996 to 2000, Maile served as the President of the Congress of South African Students. He was succeeded in that office by Julius Malema. He was later chair of the Gauteng Youth Commission between 2006 and 2009.

=== Provincial legislature: 2009–2010 ===
Pursuant to the 2009 election, he was elected to the Gauteng Provincial Legislature on the party list of the African National Congress (ANC). He was assigned to the legislature's committees on education, finance and scrutiny, and subordinate legislation.

Maile was also a prominent member of the ANC Youth League (ANCYL) in Gauteng; his local party branch was in Centurion. News24 reported that he played a critical role at the mainstream ANC's Gauteng provincial elective conference in May 2010, lobbying ANCYL branches to back Paul Mashatile's successful bid for re-election as ANC Provincial Chairperson.

On 15 August 2010, Maile was elected Provincial Chairperson of the Gauteng ANCYL, with Simon Molefe as his deputy. According to the Sunday Times, Maile's campaign was backed unofficially by Mashatile, while the other candidate, Thabo Kupa, had the support of Julius Malema, then the ANCYL President, and of Nomvula Mokonyane, then the Premier of Gauteng.

=== Executive Council: 2010–2022 ===
==== Mokonyane premiership: 2010–2014 ====
In November 2010, Premier Mokonyane appointed Maile to her Executive Council as Member of the Executive Council (MEC) for Sports, Arts, Culture and Recreation. He was appointed alongside Ntombi Mekgwe and Humphrey Mmemezi, who were also considered "long-time loyalists" of Paul Mashatile, and it was widely believed that the provincial ANC under Mashatile's leadership had forced Mokonyane to make the appointments.

The following year, Maile was considered a contender for the post of national ANCYL President. At the league's elective conference in June 2011, he declined a nomination to stand for the position, leaving Malema to stand for re-election unopposed. In late 2013, Maile left his provincial ANCYL office when the league's national leadership disbanded the provincial leadership corps; Matome Chiloane succeeded him as ANCYL Provincial Chairperson in August 2014.

==== Makhura premiership: 2014–2022 ====
In the 2014 general election, Maile was re-elected to the provincial legislature, ranked sixth on the ANC's party list. Newly elected Premier David Makhura retained him in the Executive Council but moved him to the Economic Development portfolio. He remained in that portfolio throughout the legislative term.

He was also elected to a four-year term on the Provincial Executive Committee of the Gauteng ANC from 2014 to 2018. Towards the end of the term, in June 2018, he stood unsuccessfully for election as Deputy Provincial Chairperson of the Gauteng ANC: he lost narrowly to fellow MEC Panyaza Lesufi, earning 601 votes to Lesufi's 623. Maile was, however, re-elected to the ANC Provincial Executive Committee.

In the 2019 Gauteng provincial election, Maile was ranked fourth on the ANC's party list and was re-elected to the legislature. In Makhura's second-term Executive Council, he was appointed MEC for Human Settlements, Urban Planning and Cooperative Governance and Traditional Affairs, a new portfolio.

As early as February 2021, Maile was touted as a possible contender to succeed Makhura as ANC Provincial Chairperson at the next party provincial conference in June 2022. Support for his campaign was strongest in the Tshwane region of Gauteng. As in 2018, Maile ran against Panyaza Lesufi. According to the Daily Maverick, ahead of the conference, Paul Mashatile attempted unsuccessfully to broker a compromise between Maile and Lesufi, which would have seen Maile elected Deputy Chairperson under Lesufi. The contest went to a vote in which Lesufi again beat Maile narrowly, receiving 575 votes to Maile's 543. Maile was re-elected to a third term on the Provincial Executive Committee.

==== Lesufi premiership: 2022–present ====
In the aftermath of the ANC conference, Lesufi succeeded Makhura as Premier and on 7 October 2022 announced a reshuffle in which Maile was appointed MEC in the newly created Human Settlements and Infrastructure Development portfolio. Following the 2024 provincial election, Lesufi appointed him MEC for the newly established Finance and Economic Development portfolio. During a reshuffle on 1 April 2026, Lesufi moved Maile to the Education and Sports, Arts, Culture and Recreation portfolio, replacing Matome Chiloane.

== Personal life ==
Maile is Pedi and a polyglot. He is married.
