= Nomantu Nkomo-Ralehoko =

South African politician (born 1966)

Nomantu Nkomo-Ralehoko MPL
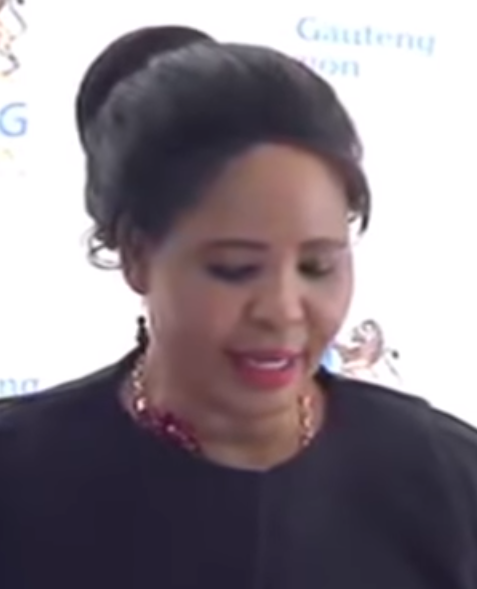

Gauteng MEC for Social Development
- Incumbent
- Assumed office 1 April 2026
- Premier: Panyaza Lesufi
- Preceded by: Faith Mazibuko

Gauteng MEC for Health and Wellness
- In office 7 October 2022 – 1 April 2026
- Premier: Panyaza Lesufi
- Preceded by: Nomathemba Mokgethi
- Succeeded by: Faith Mazibuko

Gauteng MEC for Finance and e-Government
- In office 31 May 2019 – 6 October 2022
- Premier: Panyaza Lesufi
- Preceded by: Panyaza Lesufi
- Succeeded by: Jacob Mamabolo

Gauteng MEC for Education
- In office 30 May 2019 – 31 May 2019
- Premier: David Makhura
- Preceded by: Panyaza Lesufi
- Succeeded by: Panyaza Lesufi

Deputy Speaker of the Gauteng Provincial Legislature
- In office 20 March 2018 – 7 May 2019
- Preceded by: Uhuru Moiloa
- Succeeded by: Nomvuyo Mhlakaza-Manamela

Gauteng MEC for Agriculture and Rural Development
- In office 8 May 2009 – 5 June 2009
- Premier: Nomvula Mokonyane
- Succeeded by: Nandi Mayathula-Khoza

Personal details
- Born: 8 June 1966 (age 60) Ngcobo, Cape Province, South Africa
- Party: African National Congress
- Children: 2
- Profession: Politician

Nomantu Nkomo-Ralehoko (born 8 June 1966) is a South African politician and a member of the African National Congress. She has served as the Gauteng MEC (Member of the Executive Council) for Social Development since April 2026. She was the MEC for Finance and e-Government from May 2019 until October 2022 and the MEC for Health and Wellness from October 2022 until June 2024. Nkomo-Ralehoko was elected to the Gauteng Provincial Legislature in June 1999.

She briefly served as the Education MEC in May 2019. She was the deputy speaker of the Gauteng legislature from March 2018 until May 2019. Nkomo-Ralehoko was also the Gauteng MEC for Agriculture and Rural Development between May and June 2009.

== Early life and education ==
Nkomo-Ralehoko was born in 1966 in Ngcobo in the Eastern Cape Province. She matriculated from Nyanga Senior Secondary School. After matric, she moved to the Transvaal Province where her father lived. She studied office administration at a Vaal college. In 1988, she started working at Cosatu house. Her sister worked for the Construction and Allied Workers Union. She filled in for her sister when she was on maternity leave.

== Political career ==
While working for Cosatu, she took an interest in politics. She was then employed as an administrator at the South African Railways and Harbours Union. While working there, she went to Russia to study at a trade union school. When she returned to South Africa, she started working as a political education officer at the same trade union.

In the 1990s, she was employed in the office of Nosiviwe Mapisa-Nqakula. She served as Baleka Mbete's personal assistant, when she was still the secretary-general of the African National Congress Women's League. She also served on the executive of the women's league when Winnie Madikizela-Mandela was the league's president.

In 1995, she joined the Gauteng Provincial Legislature as an administrator. In the 1999 election, she was elected to the legislature as an ANC representative. Nkomo-Ralehoko was appointed the Gauteng MEC for Agriculture and Rural Development on 8 May 2009 after the 2009 election. She moved into the office on 13 May. Due to a fallout between her and premier Nomvula Mokonyane, she resigned as MEC on 5 June. She was then appointed chairperson of the roads and transport committee in the legislature.

Following the 2014 election, Nkomo-Ralehoko became the legislature's chair of chairs. She was elected deputy speaker of the legislature in March 2018. On 21 June 2018, she was elected deputy provincial secretary of the ANC. After the 2019 election held on 8 May, premier David Makhura selected her to be the new Education MEC, succeeding Panyaza Lesufi, who was made the MEC for Finance and e-Government. She was sworn in on 30 May. Due to public outcry, Makhura reshuffled his executive a day later and made Nkomo-Ralehoko and Lesufi swap positions.

On 27 June 2022, Nkomo-Ralehoko, who had previously served as the deputy provincial secretary of the ANC, was elected as the deputy provincial chairperson. Following the election of Panyaza Lesufi as Gauteng premier in October 2022, she was appointed MEC for Health and Wellness.

Nkomo-Ralehoko was reappointed as the MEC for Health and Wellness by premier Lesufi following the 2024 provincial election. In February 2026, Nkomo-Ralehoko came under scrutiny with calls for her to be fired after saying that some patients in Gauteng hospitals prefer to sleep on the floor.

On 1 April 2026, Nkomo-Ralehoko was appointed MEC for Social Development.

== Personal life ==
Nkomo-Ralehoko has two sons. She is a supporter of the Orlando Pirates.
