= Mandla Nkomfe =

South African politician

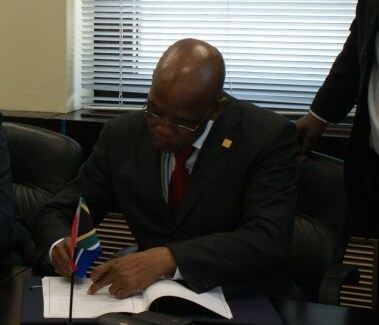

Member of the Gauteng Executive Council for Finance
- In office October 2008 – May 2014
- Premier: Paul Mashatile; Nomvula Mokonyane
- Preceded by: Paul Mashatile
- Succeeded by: Barbara Creecy

Member of the Gauteng Provincial Legislature
- In office 1999–2014

Deputy Provincial Secretary of the African National Congress in Gauteng
- In office 1998–2010
- Chairperson: Mathole Motshekga; Mbhazima Shilowa; Paul Mashatile
- Secretary: Obed Bapela; David Makhura
- Preceded by: Obed Bapela
- Succeeded by: Humphrey Mmemezi

Personal details
- Citizenship: South Africa
- Party: African National Congress
- Education: Wits University

Gladstone Mandlenkosi "Mandla" Nkomfe is a South African politician who was Member of the Executive Council for Finance in the Gauteng provincial government from 2009 to 2014. From 1999 to 2014, he was a Member of the Gauteng Provincial Legislature, serving as the legislature's Chairperson of Committees and then as its Majority Chief Whip. He was also the Deputy Provincial Secretary of the Gauteng branch of his political party, the African National Congress, from 1998 to 2010.

== Early life and education ==
Nkomfe is from Soweto in the former Transvaal, now part of Gauteng province. He was a prominent leader in anti-apartheid youth politics in the mid-1980s at the time of the formation of the South African Youth Congress. He has a Bachelor of Arts degree and a Master of Management degree, both from the University of the Witwatersrand.

== Career in the ANC ==
Nkomfe is a member of the African National Congress (ANC). From 1998 until 2010, he was the Deputy Provincial Secretary of the ANC in Gauteng, deputising Obed Bapela for one term and then David Makhura for three further terms. In 2007, he supported Paul Mashatile's successful bid to become ANC Provincial Chairperson. In January 2010, ahead of the expiry of his fourth term in the party office, Nkomfe indicated that he would not stand for re-election; he was succeeded by Humphrey Mmemezi in July that year.

== Career in the Gauteng government ==
=== Provincial legislature: 1999–2008 ===
While serving in his party office, from 1999, Nkomfe was a Member of the Gauteng Provincial Legislature. He also served as a presiding officer in the legislature as Chairperson of Committees from 1999 to 2004. After his re-election to the provincial legislature in the 2004 general election, Nkomfe was appointed Chief Whip of the Majority Party in the legislature, succeeding Richard Mdakane. In November 2006, a female member of the legislature accused Nkomfe of sexual harassment, alleging that he had touched her inappropriately and told her that she should have sex with him to advance her political career. Nkomfe was cleared of the charge by an internal ANC task team, which included Sophie Williams-De Bruyn, Amos Masondo, and ANC Women's League provincial leader Doreen Senokoanyane.

=== Executive Council: 2008–2014 ===
Nkomfe remained Chief Whip until October 2008, when ANC Provincial Chairperson Paul Mashatile was elected Premier of Gauteng after the incumbent, Mbhazima Shilowa, defected to the opposition Congress of the People. Nkomfe was appointed to Mashatile's Executive Council, where he replaced Mashatile as Member of the Executive Council (MEC) for Finance and Economic Affairs; Lindiwe Maseko succeeded him as Chief Whip.

After the 2009 general election, Nomvula Mokonyane, who succeeded Mashatile as Premier, retained Nkomfe as MEC for Finance. Before the election, Nkomfe had been considered a strong contender for election to the premiership himself. On 23 November 2012, he was named "Hero of the Week" by Corruption Watch, a Transparency International affiliate, which praised his "firm commitment to ridding the province of corruption" and "prioritising corruption busting in local government".

Ahead of the 2014 general election, Nkomfe was again one of the leading contenders to stand as the ANC's candidate for Premier of Gauteng. However, in April, Nkomfe withdrew his name from the ANC's provincial party list (on which he had initially been ranked fourth), removing himself from contention for an ordinary seat in the provincial legislature as well as for the premiership. In the Executive Council he was succeeded by Barbara Creecy. He said that he would remain active in the ANC but would seek to pursue an academic career researching ICT policy and regulation.

== Subsequent positions ==
From 2014, Nkomfe was employed as a special advisor to Minister Pravin Gordhan in the South African national government – first at the Ministry of Cooperative Governance and Traditional Affairs, then at the Ministry of Finance, and then, as of 2020, at the Ministry of Public Enterprises. In 2017 and 2018, he was involved in high-profile civic campaigns which opposed incumbent national President Jacob Zuma. In April 2018, he was appointed to a five-year term on the board of the Financial and Fiscal Commission of South Africa. As of 2020, he was also a member of the board of trustees at the Ahmed Kathrada Foundation.
