= Hope Papo =

South African politician

- Occupation: Politician

Hope Papo is a South African politician from the African National Congress. He was a member of the National Assembly of South Africa.
