= Congress of South African Students =

Anti-apartheid student organization

The Congress of South African Students (COSAS) is an anti-apartheid student organisation established in 1979 in the wake of the June 16 Soweto Uprisings in 1976 in South Africa.

== Background ==
COSAS was formed in June 1979 after the South African Students' Movement was banned in 1977. It set out to organise black students at secondary, night, technical and teacher training schools as well as correspondence colleges. The COSAS was formed from exile by President Oliver Tambo and COSAS's first president was Ephraim Mogale. In its first two years COSAS took up two commemorative campaigns that authorities saw as African National Congress-supporting: the 1979 hanging of uMkhonto weSizwe (MK) guerrilla Solomon Mahlangu and the centenary of the Zulu victory over British troops at Isandhlwana.

In 1982, COSAS adopted the theme "Student-worker action" and promoted the formation of youth congresses to serve the interests of young workers and unemployed youth. The organization provided support to striking workers and community struggles around issues such as transport increases, rent hikes and the like.

In 1983, the COSAS welcomed the formation of the United Democratic Front (UDF) and played a key role in the formation of the regional UDF structures in all of the provinces. It saw the UDF as representing a common platform to fight for a free and democratic South Africa.

Throughout the 1980s, under the banner of COSAS, students staged a variety of resistance tactics like boycotts and strikes. In Cradock, Eastern Cape students from seven schools boycotted the transfer of Matthew Goniwe, a teacher and anti-apartheid activist who was later murdered by apartheid security forces. COSAS's current president is Thabang Mokoena. COSAS has the stated goal of uniting and representing South African students of poor and disadvantaged backgrounds at "the Pre-Tertiary Level". The COSAS motto is “Each One Teach One”.
