= Kgosientsho Ramokgopa =

South African politician (born 1975)

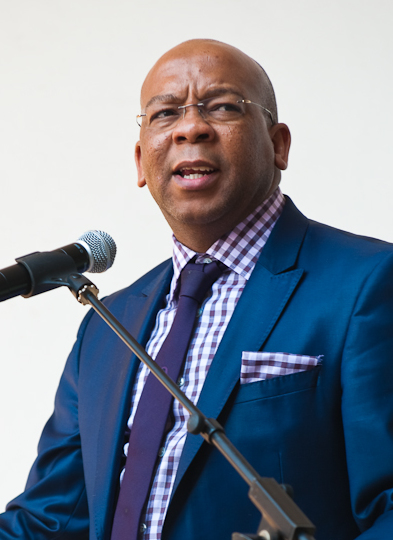
- Ramokgopa in September 2011

Minister of Electricity and Energy
- Incumbent
- Assumed office 3 July 2024
- President: Cyril Ramaphosa
- Deputy: Samantha Graham
- Preceded by: Office established

Minister in the Presidency responsible for Electricity
- In office 7 March 2023 – 19 June 2024
- President: Cyril Ramaphosa
- Preceded by: Office established

Member of the Gauteng Executive Council for Economic Development, Agriculture, and Environment
- In office 29 May 2019 – 11 October 2019
- Premier: David Makhura
- Preceded by: Lebogang Maile (for Economic Development)
- Succeeded by: Morakane Mosupyoe

Mayor of Tshwane
- In office 2 November 2010 – August 2016
- Preceded by: Gwen Ramokgopa
- Succeeded by: Solly Msimanga

Personal details
- Born: Kgosientsho David Ramokgopa; 25 January 1975 (age 51)
- Party: African National Congress
- Spouse: Georgia Ramokgopa
- Relations: Gwen Ramokgopa (aunt)
- Education: University of Durban-Westville; University of Pretoria
- Nickname: Sputla

Kgosientsho David "Sputla" Ramokgopa (born 25 January 1975) is a South African politician who was the Minister in the Presidency responsible for Electricity from 2023, and the Minister of Electricity and Energy from 3 July 2024. He was the Mayor of Tshwane from 2010 to 2016. He was also a Member of the Executive Council in the Gauteng provincial government in 2019 and worked in the Presidency of South Africa as head of infrastructure from 2019 to 2023.

A civil engineer by training, Ramokgopa entered formal politics as a ward councillor for the African National Congress (ANC) in Tshwane between 2000 and 2005. After several years running public and private entities, he returned to politics in November 2010 when he was elected Mayor of Tshwane. By that time he was also the Regional Chairperson of the ANC's branch in Tshwane, a position he held until 2018. In June 2016, Ramokgopa was passed over for reappointment as the ANC's mayoral candidate in the 2016 local government elections, which the ANC ultimately lost; the ANC's selection of Thoko Didiza as its mayoral candidate led to violent protests in which five people were killed. After the election, Ramokgopa declined to serve as an ordinary local councillor and retreated from frontline politics.

Pursuant to the 2019 general election, Ramokgopa served a brief stint in the Gauteng Provincial Legislature and as MEC for Economic Development, Agriculture, and Environment under Premier David Makhura. He was MEC for only four-and-a-half months, between May and October 2019; he resigned so that a woman could take his position in line with the ANC's internal rules about gender parity in government structures. Shortly after Ramokgopa resigned from the provincial government, President Cyril Ramaphosa appointed him to head the investment and infrastructure unit in the Presidency. In addition, Ramokgopa was a member of the Provincial Executive Committee of the Gauteng ANC until July 2022, and in December 2022 he was elected to a five-year term on the party's National Executive Committee.

== Early life and education ==
Ramokgopa was born on 25 January 1975. His family is originally from Ga-Ramokgopa village in what is now Limpopo province. He had seven siblings and matriculated in 1991 in Atteridgeville, a township to the west of Pretoria, now part of Gauteng province. While a child, he was nicknamed "Sputla" for his soccer prowess.

He has a Bachelor's degree in civil engineering, Master's degrees in public administration and business leadership, and a PhD in public affairs. While studying civil engineering at the University of Durban-Westville, he became involved in politics through the South African Student Congress (SASCO) and the African National Congress (ANC) Youth League.

== Political career ==
Ramokgopa's formal political career began when he was elected to represent the ANC as a local councillor in Tshwane's ward 51, where he served from 2000 to 2005 while also working as a transport engineer. For the half decade after his resignation as a public representative in 2005, he held a range of positions in public and private entities, first as chief executive officer of the Metropolitan Trading Company, a public entity under the City of Johannesburg municipality, from 2004 to 2006. He was also deputy chairperson of the Limpopo Board of Trade and Investment and, from 2006 to 2010, chief executive officer of Johannesburg Market. In the latter position he was named 2008 Boss of the Year.

At the same time, Ramokgopa was active in the provincial ANC, and by 2010 was chairperson of the party's large regional branch in Tshwane. His candidacy for the Regional Chairperson position in 2009 received the support of the regional branch of the ANC Youth League. According to the Mail & Guardian, Ramokgopa played an important role at the Gauteng ANC's provincial elective conference in May 2010, working with Nat Kekana to amass support for Paul Mashatile's successful campaign to be re-elected as ANC Provincial Chairperson in a contest with Gauteng Premier Nomvula Mokonyane. In July 2010, sources told the newspaper that, partly because of his support for Mashatile, Ramokgopa was a leading candidate for promotion to a mayoral position, although some regional ANC leaders reportedly argued that he was too young for the job.

=== Mayor of Tshwane: 2010–2016 ===
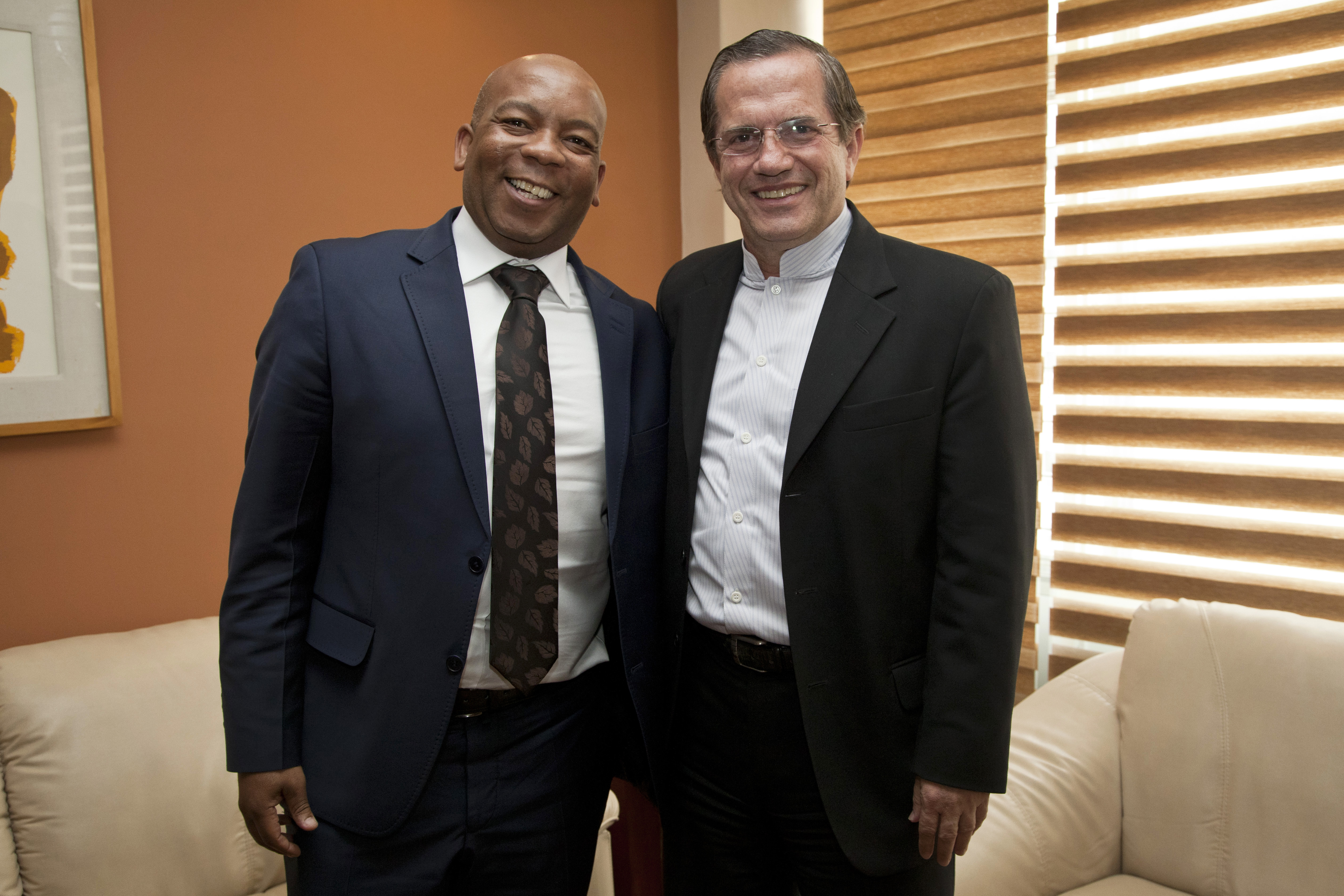
Ramokgopa meets Ecuadorian Foreign Minister Ricardo Patiño in Quito, 11 April 2013

On 2 November 2010, the Tshwane council elected Ramokgopa as Mayor of Tshwane; he beat the opposition candidate, Gerhardus Pretorius of the Democratic Alliance, with 92 votes to Pretorius's 49. He succeeded his aunt, Gwen Ramokgopa, who had left the position to serve as Deputy Minister of Health under President Jacob Zuma. Despite predictions that the ANC would lose its majority in Tshwane in the 2011 local government elections, Ramokgopa retained his position in 2011; after his re-election in May, he announced a major reshuffle of his Mayoral Committee.

The Business Day said that "the largest blight on his legacy" as mayor was a project to roll-out smart prepaid electricity meters across the city under the Security of Revenue Project, launched in October 2013. The contract to install the meters, awarded to PEU Capital Partners, was challenged in the courts and opposition parties said that it had been awarded irregularly and had cost the city billions of rands in unnecessary expenditures.

==== ANC Regional Chairperson ====
While mayor, Ramokgopa retained his post as ANC Regional Chairperson in Tshwane, winning re-election in 2011 and 2014. In 2011, a lobby group – consisting of elements of the trade unions, the South African Communist Party (SACP), and the ANC Youth League – sought unsuccessfully to replace him with Lucky Montana, the chief executive of the Passenger Rail Agency of South Africa. In 2014, he faced opposition from a larger grouping, including various local business forums and regional structures of the SACP, its Young Communist League, the ANC Youth League, and Congress of South African Trade Unions. The regional SACP said that it would boycott the 2014 provincial elective conference and instead organised a march on the Union Buildings, calling for the Tshwane municipality to be put under administration by the national government.

==== Succession ====
Ahead of the 2016 local government elections, Ramokgopa was ranked second on the regional ANC's list of nominees to stand for election as councillor, but he was not nominated to stand for re-election as mayor. Reports suggested that he had been passed over due to "intense factional battles" between his supporters and supporters of ANC Deputy Regional Chairperson Mapiti Matsena, as well as because of concerns about his style of governance and the smart meter contract. In addition, sources told the Mail & Guardian that Ramokgopa had fallen out with Paul Mashatile and other provincial ANC leaders over questions of national leadership succession in the ANC: he had apparently disagreed with their harsh response to a recent Constitutional Court finding that President Jacob Zuma had misconducted himself in respect of the Nkandla scandal, and had urged the provincial leadership publicly to accept Zuma's apology. Mashatile denied that such divisions existed.

In June 2016, tensions about the Tshwane mayoral candidacy rose and peaked when the national ANC announced that it had proposed national politician Thoko Didiza as the party's candidate to succeed Ramokgopa. During the week after the announcement, at least five people died in violent protests in Tshwane. Ramokgopa himself was serene about his imminent departure from the mayoral office and expressed his support for Didiza, calling for calm in the city. At political meetings, however, local ANC members opposed to Didiza reportedly demanded his re-election, chanting "No Sputla, no votes". A leading local newspaper, the Pretoria News, and the Mail & Guardian both reported that the violence had allegedly been part of a campaign by Ramokgopa's supporters to make Tshwane "ungovernable" after Didiza's nomination.

==== Aftermath ====
The ANC ultimately lost its majority in Tshwane in the 2016 election, for the first time since the end of apartheid, and Ramokgopa was succeeded as mayor by a Democratic Alliance candidate, Solly Msimanga, rather than by Didiza. While the votes in the election were still being counted, Ramokgopa said that he would not take up a seat as an ordinary councillor – despite previous announcements to the contrary – but instead would focus on his PhD thesis and his party work. He said that he wanted a "break" and to "give [Didiza] space" since "it would be an awkward situation" with Didiza leading the municipality while he led the regional ANC.

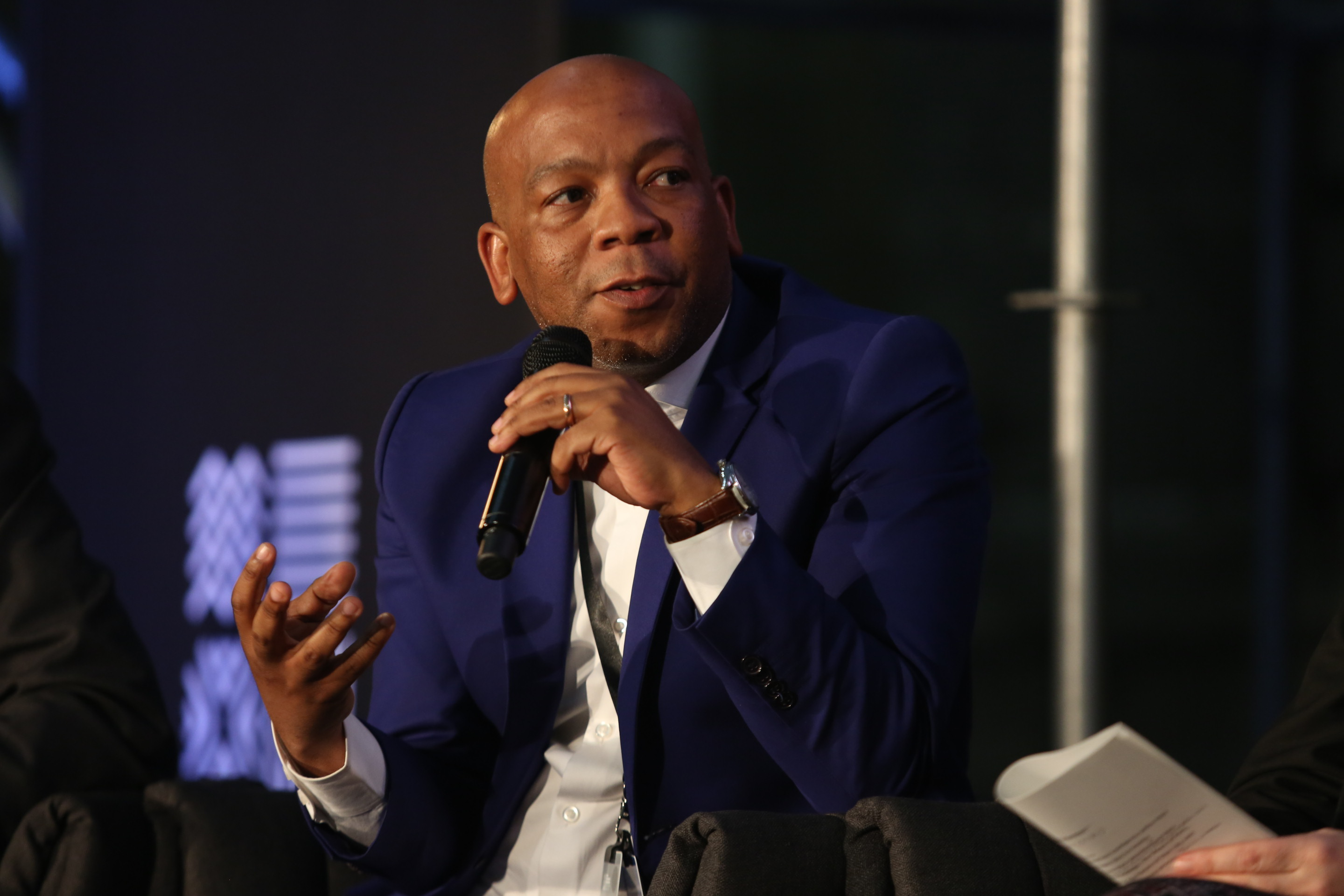
Ramokgopa addressing an Open Government Partnership event, September 2015

Ramokgopa continued to lead the Tshwane ANC, though as an appointed Regional Convener rather than as an elected Regional Chairperson after his three-year term expired in 2017. In July 2018, he did not stand for re-election as ANC Regional Chairperson and Kgoši Maepa was elected to succeed him. By then, Ramokgopa was touted as a possible candidate to succeed Paul Mashatile as ANC Provincial Chairperson in Gauteng; one group within the party, reportedly led by Lebogang Maile, was rumoured to support Ramokgopa over the frontrunner, David Makhura. At the ANC's provincial elective conference later in July, Ramokgopa was nominated to stand for the chairmanship but declined, winning Makhura to be elected unopposed. Ramokgopa was, however, elected to a four-year term on the Provincial Executive Committee of the Gauteng ANC and subsequently chaired its subcommittee on economic transformation.

=== Gauteng Executive Council: 2019 ===
In the 2019 general election, Ramokgopa was elected to a seat in the Gauteng Provincial Legislature; he was ranked 10th on the party list of the ANC, which remained the majority party in Gauteng. Shortly after the election, on 29 May, Makhura, as Premier of Gauteng, appointed Ramokgopa to his Executive Council; he served as Member of the Executive Council (MEC) for Economic Development, Agriculture, and Environment.

However, Ramokgopa spent only four-and-a-half months in this position; he resigned on 11 October and was replaced by Morakane Mosupyoe. His resignation and replacement was largely understood to be related to a directive from the ANC national leadership compelling Makhura to replace one of his six male MECs to improve gender representation in the Executive Council: the party had decided that 60% of the provincial executive should be female in provinces where the Premier was male. The Provincial Secretary of the Gauteng ANC, Jacob Khawe, confirmed this and said that other provincial leaders admired Ramokgopa for volunteering to resign, a decision that the Gauteng ANC viewed as "an act of revolutionary consciousness that can be a lesson to others".

=== The Presidency: 2019–2022 ===
In the weeks after Ramokgopa resigned from the Executive Council, City Press and News24 reported that the ANC was considering Ramokgopa for deployment to a range of public offices, including possibly in Premier Makhura's office, at a state-owned enterprise like Eskom or Transnet, or as Deputy Minister of Mineral Resources and Energy following the death of incumbent Bavelile Hlongwa. On 4 November 2019, less than a month after Ramokgopa's resignation as MEC, the Presidency announced that Ramokgopa had been appointed head of the new Investment and Infrastructure Office under President Cyril Ramaphosa. The office was established to develop and coordinate South Africa's investment strategy, and Ramokgopa reported directly to the President. He retained the position as of 2022 and Investec described him as "respected and competent".

Ramokgopa also remained active in the ANC, although he failed to gain re-election to the Gauteng Provincial Executive Committee at the next provincial elective conference in July 2022. When the ANC held its 55th National Conference in December 2022, Ramokgopa was elected to the party's National Executive Committee for the first time; by number of votes received, he was ranked 49th of the 80 candidates elected, receiving 1,229 votes across the 4,029 ballots cast in total.

=== Minister of Electricity and Energy: 2023–present ===
On 6 March 2023, Ramokgopa was appointed Minister of Electricity and Energy by president Cyril Ramaphosa. He was sworn into office the following day.

After the 2024 election, on 3 July 2024 he was sworn in as the Minister of Electricity and Energy in the third cabinet of president Ramaphosa. From there onwards he took responsibility for the execution of the Generation Operational Recovery Plan, which, by March 2025, was scheduled to mark the end of load shedding.

== Personal life ==
On his 40th birthday in January 2015, Ramokgopa married Georgia Shekeshe, following a traditional wedding ceremony in Atteridgeville in late 2014. They met early in Ramokgopa's mayoral term, when Shekeshe served as personal assistant in his office. At the time of their wedding, they had a two-year old son.
