= Mbali Hlophe =

South African politician (born 1983)

Mbali Hlophe MPL
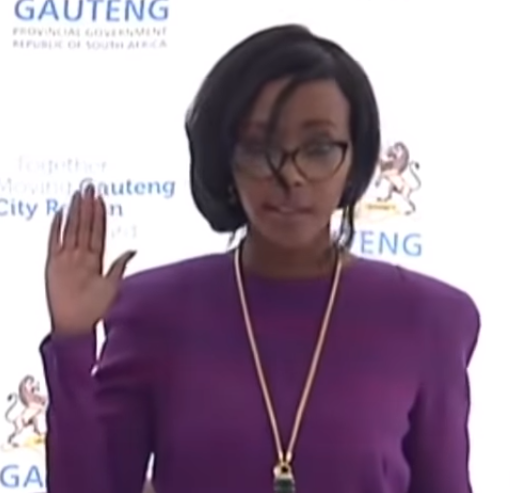
- Hlophe at her swearing-in on 30 May 2019

Gauteng MEC for Social Development
- In office 7 October 2022 – 14 June 2024
- Premier: Panyaza Lesufi
- Preceded by: Morakane Mosupyoe
- Succeeded by: Faith Mazibuko

Gauteng MEC for Sport, Arts, Culture and Recreation
- In office 30 May 2019 – 6 October 2022
- Premier: David Makhura
- Preceded by: Faith Mazibuko
- Succeeded by: Morakane Mosupyoe

Member of the Gauteng Provincial Legislature
- Incumbent
- Assumed office 22 May 2019

Personal details
- Born: Mbali Dawn Hlophe Soweto, Transvaal Province, South Africa
- Party: African National Congress
- Education: Parktown Girls High School
- Alma mater: University of the Witwatersrand
- Occupation: Politician

Mbali Dawn Hlophe (born 7 February 1983) is a South African politician who served as the Member of the Executive Council (MEC) for Sport, Arts, Culture and Recreation from May 2019 to October 2022 and then as the MEC for Social Development from October 2022 until June 2024. A member of the African National Congress, she has been a Member of the Gauteng Provincial Legislature since May 2019.

== Early life and education ==
Hlophe was born in Soweto in South Africa's former Transvaal Province. Her father worked as a priest at the Old Apostolic Church. She matriculated from Parktown Girls High School and studied at the University of the Witwatersrand.

== Political career ==
Hlophe served as the president of the student representative council at Wits. She was also a member of the provincial executive committee of the African National Congress Youth League for two consecutive terms and its spokesperson.

At the provincial election held on 8 May 2019, she was elected to the Gauteng Provincial Legislature as an ANC representative, and was sworn in as an MPL on 22 May. On 29 May, premier David Makhura announced his executive council. Hlophe was appointed MEC responsible for the provincial Department of Sport, Arts, Culture and Recreation. She was sworn in the following day.

On 7 October 2022, Hlophe was appointed Social Development MEC in the executive council led by the newly-elected premier Panyaza Lesufi. Hlophe was not reappointed to the Executive Council following the 2024 provincial election.
