= Morakane Mosupyoe =

South African politician (born 1960)

Morakane Mosupyoe MPL

Speaker of the Gauteng Provincial Legislature
- Incumbent
- Assumed office 14 June 2024
- Premier: Panyaza Lesufi
- Preceded by: Ntombi Mekgwe

Gauteng MEC for Sports, Arts, Culture and Recreation
- In office 7 October 2022 – 14 June 2024
- Premier: Panyaza Lesufi
- Preceded by: Mbali Hlophe

Gauteng MEC for Social Development
- In office 2 December 2020 – 6 October 2022
- Premier: David Makhura
- Preceded by: Nomathemba Mokgethi
- Succeeded by: Mbali Hlophe

Gauteng MEC for Economic Development, Agriculture and Environment
- In office 11 October 2019 – 2 December 2020
- Premier: David Makhura
- Preceded by: Kgosientso Ramokgopa
- Succeeded by: Parks Tau

Member of the Gauteng Provincial Legislature
- Incumbent
- Assumed office 22 May 2019

Personal details
- Born: 26 October 1960 (age 65)
- Party: African National Congress
- Profession: Politician

Audrey Winifred Morakane Ketlhoilwe Mosupyoe (known as Morakane Mosupyoe; born 26 October 1960) is a South African politician serving as the speaker of the Gauteng Provincial Legislature since June 2024. She was the Member of the Executive Council (MEC) for Economic Development, Agriculture and Environment from October 2019 to December 2020, the MEC for Social Development from December 2020 until October 2022 and the MEC for Sports, Arts, Culture and Recreation from October 2022 until June 2024. Prior to her election to the Gauteng Provincial Legislature in 2019, she served as a Tshwane city councillor. Mosupyoe is a member of the African National Congress.

== Political career ==
Mosupyoe joined the African National Congress in 2002 after having been approached by party members. She was elected to the Tshwane city council in 2006. During her first term, she served as the member of the mayoral committee (MMC) for human settlements until October 2009 when she was appointed the MMC for health and social development. She also served on the ANC's regional executive committee and the regional working committee. She is currently a member of the ANC's provincial executive committee and provincial working committee.

After her re-election in May 2011, she was elected as the first female speaker of the council. She held this position until the 2016 election, when she left the council. Mosupyoe was elected to the Gauteng Provincial Legislature in May 2019. She was then appointed chairperson of the social development portfolio committee in the legislature.

In July 2019, the National Executive Committee of the ANC resolved that Gauteng premier David Makhura had to sack one of his male MECs in order for his executive council to comply with their ruling after the election that in a province with a male premier, 60% of the executive council members had to be female. On 11 October 2019, Makhura announced that the MEC for Economic Development, Agriculture and Environment, Kgosientso Ramokgopa, had resigned from the provincial government. Consequently, he appointed Mosupyoe to Ramokgopa's post. She was sworn in later that same day.

In an executive council reshuffle in December 2020, she was appointed as MEC for Social Development by Makhura.

On 27 June 2022, Mosupyoe was elected as the provincial treasurer of the ANC in Gauteng. She was appointed as MEC for Sports, Arts, Culture and Recreation by the newly elected premier, Panyaza Lesufi.

Mosupyoe was elected speaker of the provincial legislature following the 2024 provincial election.

== Personal life ==
Mosupyoe grew up in Atteridgeville with her five siblings.
