= Faith Mazibuko =

South African politician (born 1965)

Faith Mazibuko MPL
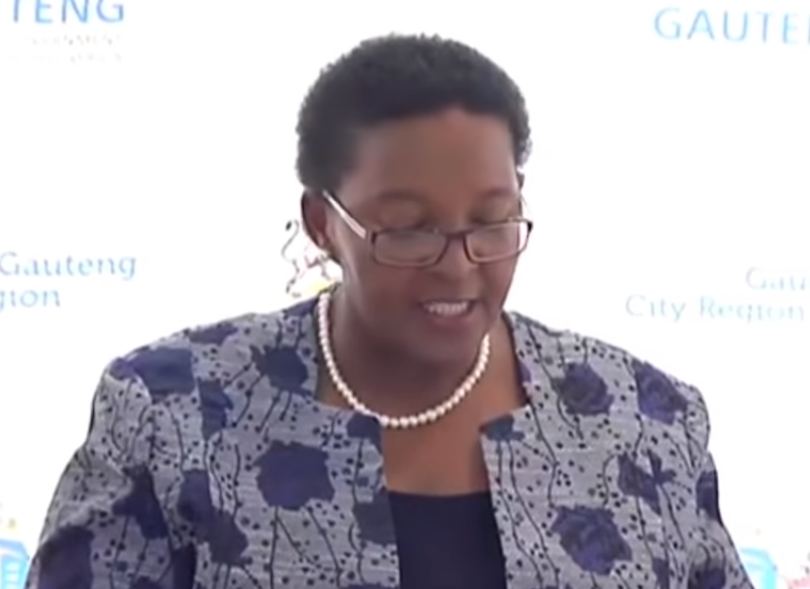
- Mazibuko in May 2019

Gauteng MEC for Health
- Incumbent
- Assumed office 1 April 2026
- Premier: Panyaza Lesufi
- Preceded by: Nomantu Nkomo-Ralehoko

Gauteng MEC for Social Development
- In office 3 July 2024 – 1 April 2026
- Premier: Panyaza Lesufi
- Preceded by: Mbali Hlophe
- Succeeded by: Nomantu Nkomo-Ralehoko

Gauteng MEC for Community Safety
- In office 30 May 2019 – 14 June 2024
- Premier: David Makhura; Panyaza Lesufi
- Preceded by: Sizakele Emelda Nkosi-Malobane
- Succeeded by: Office abolished
- In office 3 November 2010 – 23 May 2014
- Premier: Nomvula Mokonyane
- Preceded by: Khabisi Mosunkutu
- Succeeded by: Sizakele Emelda Nkosi-Malobane
Additional offices held
Gauteng MEC for Sports, Heritage, Arts and Culture
In office 21 October 2015 – 29 May 2019
Premier	David Makhura
Preceded by	Molebatsi Bopape
Succeeded by	Mbali Hlophe
Gauteng MEC for Agriculture, Environment, Rural Development and Social Development
In office 23 May 2014 – 21 October 2015
Premier	David Makhura
Preceded by	New position
Succeeded by	Molebatsi Bopape
Gauteng MEC for Infrastructure Development
In office 8 May 2009 – 2 November 2010
Premier	Nomvula Mokonyane
Preceded by	New position
Succeeded by	Bheki Nkosi
Member of the Gauteng Provincial Legislature
Incumbent
Assumed office 6 May 2009
In office 1996–2004
Permanent delegate to the National Council of Provinces
In office 2004–2009

Personal details
- Born: 2 April 1965 (age 61) Charteston Location, Nigel, Transvaal Province, South Africa
- Party: African National Congress

Nonhlanhla Faith Mazibuko (born 2 April 1965) is a South African politician from Gauteng. She is the current Member of the Executive Council (MEC) for Health. She has been a Member of the Gauteng Provincial Legislature from 1996 to 2004 and currently from 2009. Mazibuko is a member of the African National Congress.

Born in the Charteston Location in Nigel, Mazibuko matriculated from Sekano-Ntoane Senior Secondary School. She enrolled for and obtained multiple qualifications from various institutions of higher learning. A member of the African National Congress, she was active in the party's youth league and served on multiple party structures. She became a member of the Gauteng Provincial Legislature in 1996.

In 2004, she was elected to the National Council of Provinces as a permanent delegate from Gauteng. Mazibuko returned to the provincial legislature in 2009 and was appointed Member of the Executive Council (MEC) for Infrastructure Development. She became MEC for Community Safety in November 2010. After the 2014 elections, Mazibuko was selected as the MEC for the expanded Agriculture, Environment, Rural Development and Social Development portfolio. In October 2015 Mazibuko was moved to the Sports, Heritage, Arts and Culture portfolio. She was appointed as Gauteng MEC for Community Safety in May 2019 before becoming the MEC for Social Development in July 2024. In April 2026, she was moved to the Health portfolio of the Executive Council.

== Early life and education ==
Faith Nonhlanhla Mazibuko was born on 2 April 1965 in the Charteston township in Nigel in South Africa's former Transvaal Province. She attended the Jabavu East Community School and St Matthews Roman Catholic School before attending Marianhill High School in Pinetown in the former Natal Province. Mazibuko then moved back to the Transvaal and matriculated from the Sekano-Ntoane Senior Secondary School. She then enrolled for a degree at the University of South Africa majoring in Education, English and History.

Mazibuko completed an Executive Strategic Leadership Course at the Graduate School of Public Management of the University of the Witwatersrand. She then studied for a certificate in leadership communication and a certificate in public and parliamentary leadership with Rhodes University and the Afrika Intellectual Resources, respectively.

She studied a short courses in History of Afrikan Feminism, Critical Approaches of Gender Policy Planning and Design, and Introduction to Thought Leadership for Africa's Renewal through the Thabo Mbeki African Leadership Institute(TMALI). She also studied a short course on Committees in Defence of the Revolution at the National CDR Cadres School in Havana, Cuba.

== Politics ==
In her youth, Mazibuko was an active member of the following organisations: the Soweto Students League, the Young Christian Students, the Soweto Youth Congress, and the Soweto Civic Organisation. She was an executive member of the African National Congress Youth League's branch in Moroka, Soweto and the branch's pioneer officer. She served as the Secretary for Sports, Arts and Culture on the youth league's executive committee in Soweto. Mazibuko was also a member of the youth league's provincial executive committee and served as the PEC's Secretary for Sports, Arts and Culture.

During her time in Diepkloof, she was the secretary of the Vuyani Mabaxa branch. Mazibuko was re-elected as a member of the ANC's executive committee for the Greater Johannesburg region. Mazibuko was sworn in as a Member of the Gauteng Provincial Legislature in 1996. During her tenure as an MPL, she was an ANC whip and served on the legislature's portfolio and select committees on health, education, arts and culture.

In 2004, the Gauteng legislature elected her as a permanent delegate to the National Council of Provinces representing Gauteng.

In the NCOP, she served on several Ad-hoc committees. She also co-chaired the Ad-hoc committee on the National Youth Development Agency. Mazibuko was a chair of the Women's Caucus and deputy chief whip. In May 2010, she was elected to the provincial executive committee of the ANC in Gauteng. She is the former ANCWL Gauteng Deputy Secretary and current ANCWL Gauteng Chairperson.

== Gauteng provincial government ==
=== MEC for Infrastructure Development ===
After the 2009 election, Mazibuko returned to the Gauteng Provincial Legislature. She was appointed Member of the Executive Council (MEC) for Infrastructure Development by newly elected premier Nomvula Mokonyane.

=== MEC for Community Safety ===
In November 2010, she was appointed MEC for Community Safety, replacing Khabisi Mosunkutu. Bheki Nkosi took over as MEC for Infrastructure Development.

=== MEC for Agriculture, Environment, Rural Development and Social Development. ===
Following David Makhura's election as premier in May 2014, she was appointed MEC for Agriculture, Environment, Rural Development and Social Development. Sizakele Emelda Nkosi-Malobane succeeded her as Community Safety MEC.

=== MEC for Sports, Heritage, Arts and Culture ===
In October 2015, Makhura announced that Mazibuko would swop positions with MEC for Sports, Heritage, Arts and Culture, Molebatsi Bopape. Maizbuko was implicated in controversy when a recording of her trying to force her staff to disregard procurement processes so as to fast track the delivery of combicourts in the run-up to the 2019 general elections was leaked to the media.

=== MEC for Community Safety ===
Mazibuko returned to the post of MEC for Community Safety after the 2019 general elections. She was replaced by Mbali Hlophe as MEC for Sport, Arts, Culture and Recreation.

In October 2022, newly elected premier Panyaza Lesufi reappointed Mazibuko as MEC for Community Safety.

=== MEC for Social Development ===
Following the 2024 provincial election, Mazibuko was appointed MEC for Social Development.

=== MEC for Health ===
During a cabinet reshuffle on 1 April 2026, Lesufi announced that Mazibuko would now lead the Health portfolio of the Executive Council.
