= Molebatsi Bopape =

South African politician

Member of the Gauteng Provincial Legislature
- In office May 2014 – 7 May 2019

Member of the Gauteng Executive Council for Social Development
- In office October 2015 – February 2016
- Premier: David Makhura
- Preceded by: Faith Mazibuko (for Agriculture, Environment, Rural Development and Social Development)
- Succeeded by: Nandi Mayathula-Khoza

Member of the Gauteng Executive Council for Sports, Recreation, Arts and Culture
- In office May 2014 – October 2015
- Premier: David Makhura
- Preceded by: Lebogang Maile
- Succeeded by: Faith Mazibuko (for Sports, Heritage, Arts and Culture)

Personal details
- Citizenship: South Africa
- Party: African National Congress

Molebatsi Bopape is a South African politician who served in the Gauteng Executive Council from 2014 to 2016 as Member of the Executive Council (MEC) for Sports, Recreation, Arts and Culture and MEC for Social Development. Premier David Makhura fired her in February 2016 amid allegations that she had improperly interfered in the award of a government contract. In the aftermath, she was suspended from her party, the African National Congress (ANC), from October 2016 until May 2017. In the 2019 general election, she did not seek re-election to the Gauteng Provincial Legislature.

== Career in the provincial legislature ==
In the 2014 general election, Bopape was elected as a Member of the Gauteng Provincial Legislature; she was ranked 19th on the ANC's party list. After the election, on 23 May 2014, newly elected Premier of Gauteng David Makhura announced that Bopape had been appointed to his Executive Council as MEC for Sports, Recreation, Arts and Culture.

In October 2015, Makhura announced that she would swap portfolios with Faith Mazibuko, becoming MEC for Social Development. This move was viewed as a demotion for Bopape and came amid allegations by government officials that, while in her original department, Bopape had improperly interfered in the procurement process for a R10-million government security contract. Bopape denied any wrongdoing and Makhura's spokesman said that the cabinet reshuffle was unrelated to the allegations, which would be referred to Gauteng's Integrity Commissioner for investigation.

Just over three months later, on 2 February 2016, Makhura dropped Bopape from the Executive Council, although she remained an ordinary Member of the Provincial Legislature. Bopape claimed that she had been removed from the Executive Council without being given a fair opportunity to defend herself against the misconduct allegations. In late September 2016, in a meeting of the legislature, she attempted to present a dossier of documents which she said provided her account of the events that led to her dismissal, but she was prevented from doing so by Ntombi Mekgwe, the Speaker of the Gauteng Provincial Legislature. Two opposition parties, the Democratic Alliance and the Economic Freedom Fighters, walked out of the meeting in a show of support for Bopape. The Gauteng branch of the ANC described her conduct in the meeting as having "amounted to her undermining the political authority of the ANC caucus of the Gauteng Provincial Legislature and its leadership".

On 24 October 2016, the provincial party announced that Bopape had been suspended as an ANC member, pending the conclusion of an internal disciplinary process. She was charged with defying instructions from Mekgwe and from the ANC's provincial Chief Whip, Brian Hlongwa, as well as with bringing the party into disrepute. The Gauteng ANC's disciplinary committee acquitted her on 22 May 2017. However, Bopape did not run for re-election to her legislative seat in the next general election in 2019.
