= Sizakele Nkosi-Malobane =

South African politician

Sizakele Nkosi-Malobane MPL

Member of the Gauteng Provincial Legislature
- Incumbent
- Assumed office 2009

Member of the Gauteng Executive Council for Community Safety
- In office May 2014 – May 2019
- Premier: David Makhura
- Preceded by: Faith Mazibuko
- Succeeded by: Faith Mazibuko

Personal details
- Born: Diepkloof, Soweto; Transvaal, South Africa
- Party: African National Congress

Sizakele Emelda Nkosi-Malobane is a South African politician who is currently serving as the Chairperson of Committees in the Gauteng Provincial Legislature since 2019. She was formerly Gauteng's Member of the Executive Council (MEC) for Community Safety from 2014 to 2019, and she has represented the African National Congress (ANC) in the provincial legislature since 2009.

Nkosi-Malobane was born in Diepkloof in Soweto and was active in the Congress of South African Students during apartheid. She was formerly a local councillor and Member of the Mayoral Committee in the City of Johannesburg. She was first elected to the Gauteng Provincial Legislature in 2009. She was re-elected to her seat in the 2014 general election, in which she was ranked 21st on the ANC's party list, and in May 2014 she was appointed to the Gauteng Executive Council under David Makhura, the newly elected Premier of Gauteng. She was MEC for Community Safety until the next general election in 2019, when she retained her legislative seat, ranked 35th on the ANC's party list, but was succeeded as MEC by Faith Mazibuko. Shortly after the 2019 election, the ANC announced that it would nominate Nkosi-Malobane to serve as Chairperson of Committees ("Chair of Chairs") in the provincial legislature during the 2019–2024 legislative term.
