= AmaPanyaza =

AmaPanyaza are the colloquial isiZulu nickname for the Crime Prevention Wardens (CPWs) in Gauteng. Set up by Premier Panyaza Lesufu in response to an election promises, this crime prevention wardens were a part of Lesufi's R450 million flagship program. The name "AmaPanyaza" is a playful nod to Lesufi himself, implying "Panyaza's people" or "Lesufi's squad," reflecting their affiliation with the premier. Much like Lesufi’s paperless classrooms, a technology solution was offered instead of addressing systemic failures in education. So to, these crime wardens were meant to rely on e-Policing solutions and respond to crime incidents. The Kholeka Gcaleka (Public Protector ) ruled that the “AmaPanyaza" were unconstitutional and not lawfully established.
