= Barbara Creecy =

South African politician

The Honourable Barbara Creecy MP
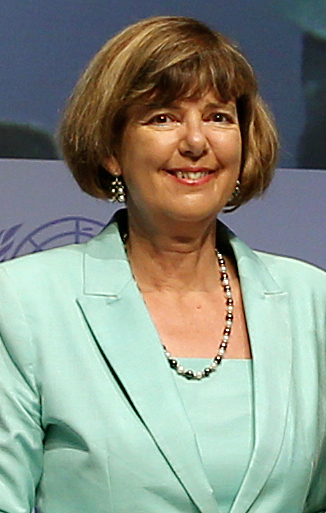
- Creecy in 2014

Minister of Transport
- Incumbent
- Assumed office 3 July 2024
- President: Cyril Ramaphosa
- Deputy: Mkhuleko Hlengwa
- Preceded by: Sindisiwe Chikunga

Minister of Environment, Forestry and Fisheries
- In office 30 May 2019 – 19 June 2024
- President: Cyril Ramaphosa
- Deputy: Maggie Sotyu
- Preceded by: Portfolio restructured
- Succeeded by: Dion George

Member of the National Assembly
- Incumbent
- Assumed office 22 May 2019
Provincial offices 1994–2019
Member of the Gauteng Executive Council for Finance
In office 23 May 2014 – 25 May 2019
Premier	David Makhura
Preceded by	Mandla Nkomfe
Succeeded by	Panyaza Lesufi
Member of the Gauteng Executive Council for Education
In office 8 May 2009 – 23 May 2014
Premier	Nomvula Mokonyane
Preceded by	Angie Motshekga
Succeeded by	Panyaza Lesufi
Member of the Gauteng Executive Council for Sports, Recreation, Arts and Culture
In office 29 April 2004 – 8 May 2009
Premier	Paul Mashatile; Mbhazima Shilowa
Preceded by	Mondli Gungubele
Succeeded by	Nelisiwe Mbatha-Mthimkhulu
Member of the Gauteng Provincial Legislature
In office 10 May 1994 – 7 May 2019

Personal details
- Born: 17 June 1958 (age 68)
- Citizenship: South Africa
- Party: African National Congress
- Other political affiliations: United Democratic Front
- Education: Roedean School
- Alma mater: University of the Witwatersrand; University of London
- Profession: Politician

Barbara Dallas Creecy (born 17 June 1958) is a South African politician and former anti-apartheid activist who has been the Minister of Transport since July 2024. She was formerly the Minister of Environment, Forestry and Fisheries between 2019 and 2024. She is a member of the National Executive Committee and National Working Committee of the African National Congress (ANC).

Raised in Johannesburg, Creecy joined the ANC in 1979 and was active in the United Democratic Front. Between 1994 and 2019, she served continuously in the Gauteng Provincial Legislature, and she was a member of the Gauteng Executive Council from 2004 to 2019, serving as Member of the Executive Council for Sports, Recreation, Arts and Culture (2004 to 2009), for Education (2009 to 2014), and for Finance (2014 to 2019). She joined the National Assembly of South Africa in the May 2019 general election and thereafter was appointed to the cabinet by President Cyril Ramaphosa.

== Early life and education ==
Born on 17 June 1958, Creecy grew up in Johannesburg. Her father, a chartered accountant who was raised in the United Kingdom, died when she was eight. He had been a member of the Communist Party and a pacifist conscientious objector during World War II; her mother, the daughter of two trade unionists, was also politically progressive.

After matriculating at the Roedean School in Parktown, Johannesburg, Creecy attended the University of the Witwatersrand on a scholarship, enrolling in 1976. She graduated with an Honours degree in political science, and she later completed a Master's degree in public policy and management at the University of London.

== Anti-apartheid activism ==
Creecy became involved in the anti-apartheid movement as a student politician, and she joined the banned African National Congress (ANC) in her final year of university, 1979, after attending a conference at Roma University in Lesotho. She became increasingly involved in activism while working with human rights lawyer Priscilla Jana, and she was a founding member of the United Democratic Front (UDF) in 1983.

Thereafter she worked with the UDF first as a member of its Civic Desk and then as an employee of a non-profit organisation that offered training and organisational development support to trade unions and civic organisations; she was closely involved in the alliance between the UDF and the Congress of South African Trade Unions under the auspices of the Mass Democratic Movement. She also worked with the ANC underground, reporting to its machinery in Botswana. She was briefly exiled in 1988 and spent two months in the Soviet Union.

== Provincial political career: 1994–2019 ==
In South Africa's first post-apartheid elections in April 1994, Creecy was elected to represent the ANC in the Gauteng Provincial Legislature. She retained her seat for the next 25 years, gaining re-election to five consecutive terms and becoming one of the longest-serving members of the legislature. Between 1994 and 2004, she served stints as chairperson of the portfolio committee on social development, and as chairperson of the portfolio committee on education. After the April 2004 general election, she was elevated to the Gauteng Executive Council when Premier Sam Shilowa appointed her as Member of the Executive Council (MEC) for Sports, Recreation, Arts and Culture. Later that year she was elected to the ANC's Provincial Executive Committee in Gauteng for the first time. She served a full five years in the sports portfolio, retained in that post after Paul Mashatile succeeded Shilowa as Premier in 2008.

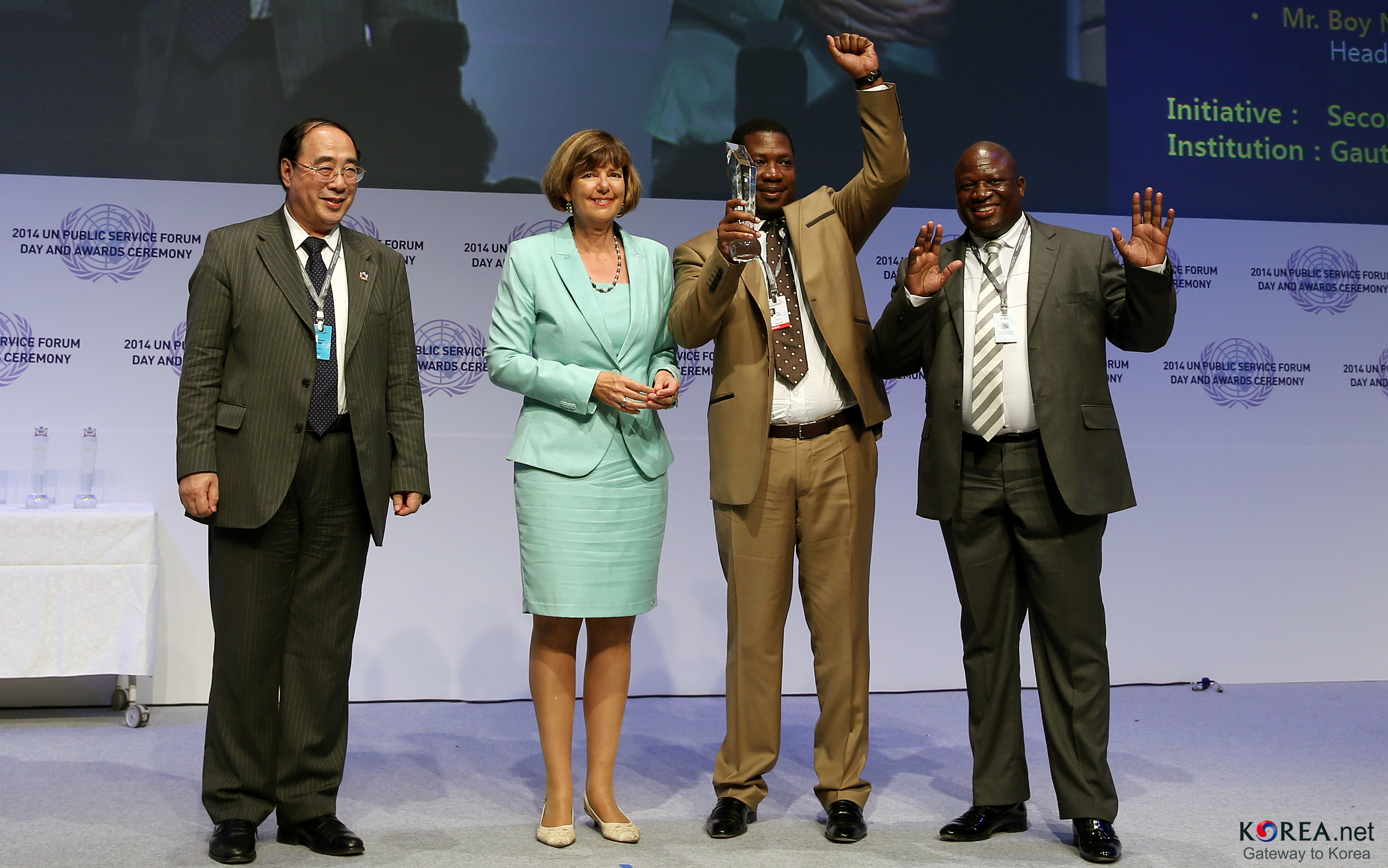
Creecy (with her successor Panyaza Lesufi) accepting the United Nations Public Service Award in Seoul, Korea in June 2014

After the May 2009 general election, Creecy became MEC for Education in the government of Premier Nomvula Mokonyane. Her initiatives in the Gauteng Department of Education included a technical education turnaround programme targeting 41 technical high schools in the province, as well as the Secondary School Improvement Programme (SSIP) in selected high schools. The SSIP won a United Nations Public Service Award in the Improving the Delivery of Public Service category, and Creecy credited it for Gauteng's record-breaking matric pass rate in the 2013 school year.

After the May 2014 general election, newly elected Premier David Makhura transferred Creecy to the high-profile position of MEC for Finance. She was the first woman to hold the office. During her five-year tenure, she introduced an open tender system requiring public adjudication and independent auditing of procurement processes; the pilot programme was introduced in 2014 and draft legislation to entrench the new system was published in 2018. In 2018 Ferial Haffajee congratulated Creecy for having "cleaned up" the department and "run an efficient and innovative provincial treasury".

While serving as Finance MEC, in December 2017, Creecy attended the ANC's 54th National Conference, which elected her to a five-year term on the ANC National Executive Committee; by number of votes received, she was ranked 61st of the 80 ordinary members elected. She was also elected to the party's 20-member National Working Committee.

== National political career: 2019–present ==
=== Environment, Forestry and Fisheries ===
In the May 2019 general election, Creecy was elected to an ANC seat in the National Assembly, the lower house of the South African Parliament. The Mail & Guardian viewed her as a frontrunner for appointment as Deputy Minister of Finance; indeed, the Gauteng ANC and Paul Mashatile reportedly lobbied for her to be appointed as Minister of Finance. Instead, on 29 May 2019, President Cyril Ramaphosa appointed Creecy to the post of Minister of Environment, Forestry and Fisheries. The Daily Maverick welcomed her appointment, saying that she had "shown competency in every portfolio she managed."

She held the environment portfolio for five years and her tenure was generally regarded as a moderate success. However, although she initially made "a number of decisions that delighted environmentalists and conservationists," her ministry was frequently embroiled in political and legal disputes over environmental standards in the mining industry. In March 2022, environmental activists succeeded in obtaining a court order instructing Creecy to implement the Highveld Priority Area Air Quality Management Plan for air pollution in the Transvaal coal belt. Her supporters argued that the scope for environmental reforms was limited, given the political clout of the Ministry of Mineral Resources and Energy under Gwede Mantashe. Creecy was also embroiled in a long-running dispute with the commercial wildlife breeding industry; she reportedly blocked a proposed 2020 amendment to the Meat Safety Act that would have allowed the commercial sale of lion meat, and she introduced a sweeping new policy on biodiversity.

As minister, Creecy was chairman of the African Ministerial Conference on the Environment between 2019 and 2021. In 2023, she and her Danish counterpart, Dan Jørgensen, were appointed by COP28 president Sultan Al Jaber to chair international political negotiations on the "global stocktake" of the Paris Agreement. She also launched South Africa's Just Energy Transition Investment Plan at COP28, which was held in Dubai that December.

The ANC's 55th National Conference was held in December 2022, and Creecy was re-elected to the National Executive Committee; she received 1,242 votes across roughly 4,000 ballots, making her the 48th-most popular member of the committee. By that time she was viewed as a firm political ally of incumbent ANC president Ramaphosa. At the new committee's first meeting in February 2023, she was appointed as the committee's chief representative in the Western Cape and as deputy chairperson of the subcommittee on elections and campaigns. She was also re-elected to the National Working Committee; she received the support of 54 of the National Executive's 80 members, making her the second-most popular candidate behind Mmamoloko Kubayi.

=== Transport ===
Creecy was re-elected to the National Assembly in the May 2024 general election. On 30 June, announcing his new multi-party cabinet, Ramaphosa appointed her to succeed Sindy Chikunga as Minister of Transport, in which capacity she is deputised by Mkhuleko Hlengwa of the Inkatha Freedom Party. She said that her initial priority would be stabilising the Department of Transport and its governance.

== Personal life ==
Creecy is divorced. She has two children.
