= Matome Chiloane =

South African politician

Matome Chiloane MPL

Gauteng MEC for Education and Sports, Arts, Culture and Recreation
- In office 3 July 2024 – 1 April 2026
- Premier: Panyaza Lesufi
- Preceded by: Office established
- Succeeded by: Lebogang Maile

Gauteng MEC for Education
- In office 7 October 2022 – 14 June 2024
- Premier: Panyaza Lesufi
- Preceded by: Panyaza Lesufi
- Succeeded by: Himself (as MEC for Education and Sports, Arts, Culture and Recreation)

Member of the Gauteng Provincial Legislature
- Incumbent
- Assumed office 20 March 2018

Personal details
- Born: Matome Kopano Chiloane
- Party: African National Congress

Matome Kopano Chiloane is a South African politician who served in Executive Council of Gauteng as the Member of the Executive Council (MEC) for Education from October 2022 to June 2024 and then as the MEC for Education and Sports, Arts, Culture and Recreation from July 2024 until April 2026. He has been a Member of the Gauteng Provincial Legislature since March 2018, representing the African National Congress. He formerly served as the chairperson of the education committee in the legislature. Chiloane is also the provincial chairperson of the African National Congress Youth League.

== Career ==
In August 2014, Chiloane was elected chairperson of the African National Congress Youth League in Gauteng.

On 20 March 2018, he was sworn in as a Member of the Gauteng Provincial Legislature. He replaced former premier Paul Mashatile.

Chiloane was elected to a full term in the 2019 provincial election. He was appointed chairperson of the education committee in the legislature.

On 7 October 2022, Chiloane was appointed MEC for Education. Following the 2024 provincial election, Chiloane was appointed to lead the Department of Sports, Arts, Culture and Recreation as well.

During a cabinet reshuffle on 1 April 2026, Lebogang Maile was appointed to succeed Chiloane as the MEC for Education and Sports, Arts, Culture and Recreation as well.
