= Buysdorp =

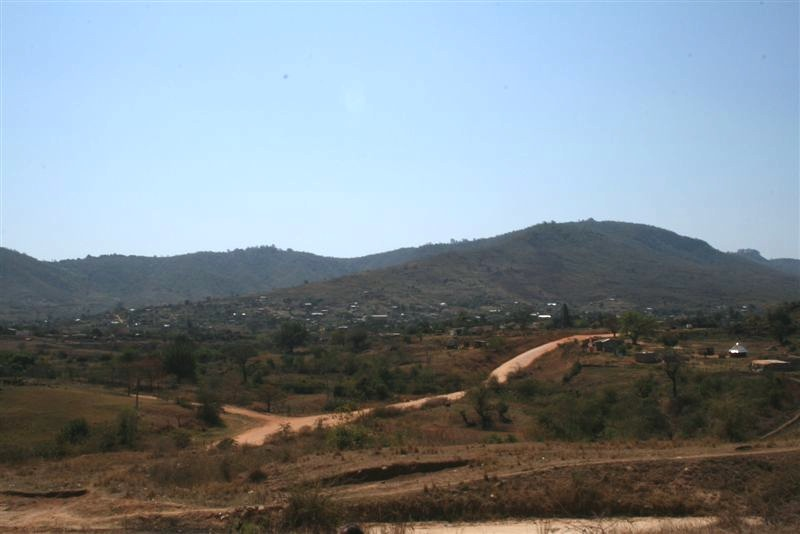
- Buysdorp

- Location within Limpopo Location within South Africa
- Coordinates: 23.066°S 29.4°E
- Country: South Africa
- Province: Limpopo
- District: Vhembe
- Municipality: Makhado

Area
  - Total: 21.67 km^{2} (8.37 sq mi)

Population (2011)
  - Total: 629
  - Density: 29.0/km^{2} (75.2/sq mi)

Racial makeup (2011)
  - Black African: 43.2%
  - Coloured: 56.8%

First languages (2011)
  - Afrikaans: 56.8%
  - Northern Sotho: 12.3%
  - Sotho: 8.8%
  - Venda: 6.8%
  - Other: 15.3%
- Time zone: UTC+2 (SAST)
- Postal code (street): 0923
- PO box: 0923

Buysdorp is a village in Makhado Local Municipality in the Limpopo province of South Africa.

A rural coloured community located 14 km from Vivo, on the R522 road to Louis Trichardt, Buysdorp was named after Coenraad de Buys, the “King of the Bastards” in Sarah Millin's fictional account of his life.

In 1888, President Paul Kruger granted 11,000 hectares of land to the Buys family for services rendered to the Transvaal Republic; they have retained this land ever since. The community are relatively self-sufficient because of their independent water supply and subsistence farming, and they maintain their own roads; as a result, they have remained comparatively insular.
