= Nomvula Mokonyane =

South African politician (born 1963)

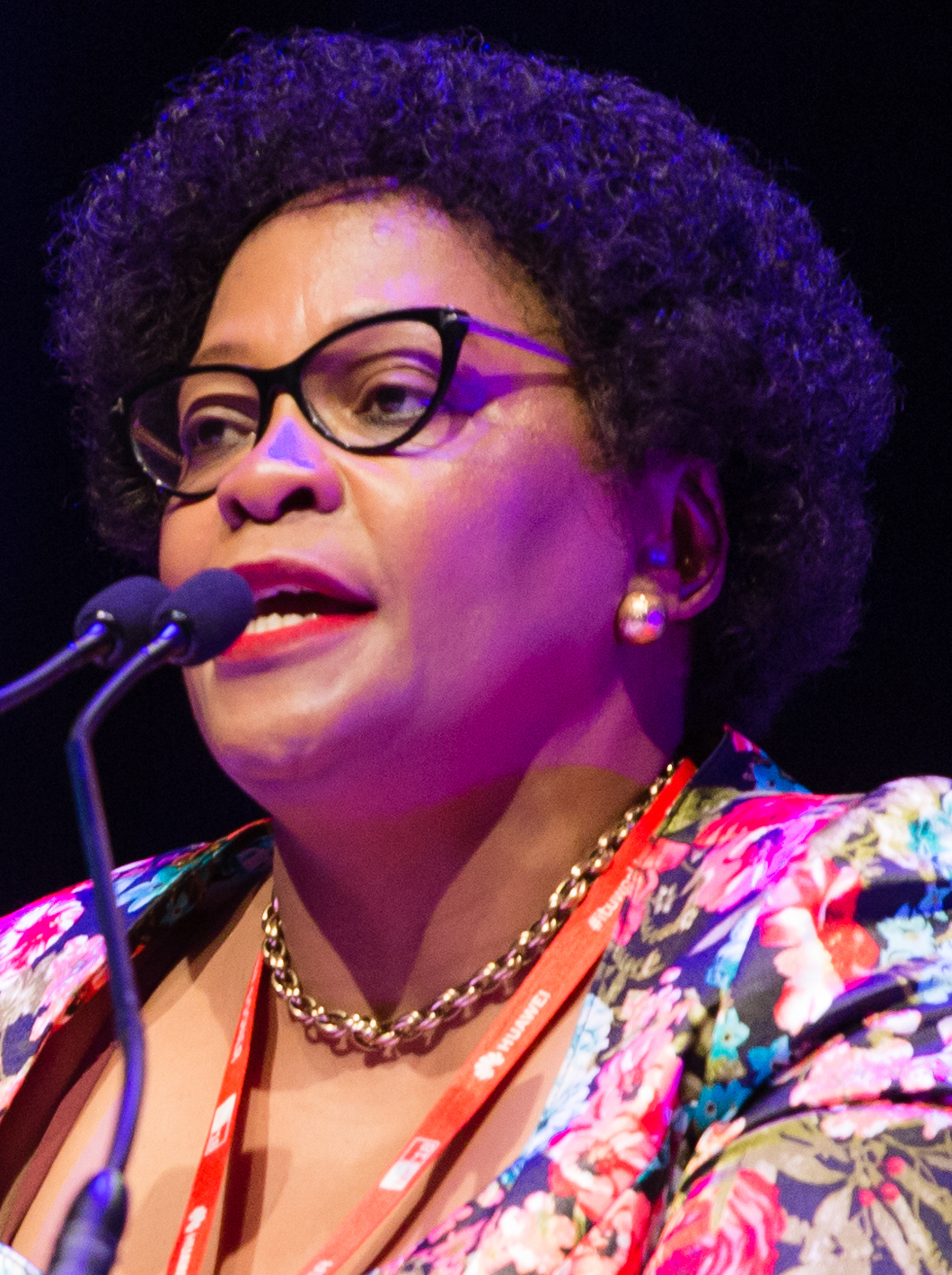

Deputy Secretary-General of the African National Congress
- Incumbent
- Assumed office 19 December 2022 Serving with Maropene Ramokgopa
- Secretary-General: Fikile Mbalula
- Preceded by: Jessie Duarte (as sole Deputy Secretary-General)

Minister of Environmental Affairs
- In office 22 November 2018 – 25 May 2019
- President: Cyril Ramaphosa
- Preceded by: Edna Molewa
- Succeeded by: Barbara Creecy

Minister of Communications
- In office 27 February 2018 – 22 November 2018
- President: Cyril Ramaphosa
- Preceded by: Mmamoloko Kubayi
- Succeeded by: Stella Ndabeni-Abrahams

Minister of Water and Sanitation
- In office 26 May 2014 – 26 February 2018
- President: Jacob Zuma; Cyril Ramaphosa
- Preceded by: Edna Molewa (as Minister of Water and Environmental Affairs)
- Succeeded by: Gugile Nkwinti

Member of the National Assembly of South Africa
- In office May 2009 – 22 May 2019
- Succeeded by: Annah Gela
- Constituency: Gauteng

5th Premier of Gauteng
- In office 6 May 2009 – 20 May 2014
- Preceded by: Paul Mashatile
- Succeeded by: David Makhura

Deputy Provincial Chairperson of the African National Congress in Gauteng
- In office 7 October 2007 – May 2010
- Chairperson: Paul Mashatile
- Preceded by: Angie Motshekga
- Succeeded by: Gwen Ramokgopa

Member of the Gauteng Provincial Legislature
- In office 27 April 1994 – 6 May 2014

Personal details
- Born: 28 June 1963 (age 62) Kagiso, Transvaal; South Africa
- Party: African National Congress
- Other political affiliations: South African Communist Party

Nomvula Paula Mokonyane (born 28 June 1963) is a South African politician who is currently the First Deputy Secretary-General of the African National Congress (ANC). She was the first female Premier of Gauteng from 2009 to 2014 and subsequently served in the national government as Minister of Water and Sanitation from 2014 to 2018, Minister of Communications in 2018, and Minister of Environmental Affairs from 2018 to 2019.

Born in Gauteng, Mokonyane was a labour, community, and gender activist during apartheid. She was first elected as a Member of the Gauteng Provincial Legislature in 1994 and she served as a Member of the Executive Council in Gauteng from 1996 to 2009. Following the 2009 general election, Mokonyane, then the Deputy Provincial Chairperson of the ANC in Gauteng, was elected to succeed Paul Mashatile as Premier. After a full five-year term as Premier, she was appointed to the cabinet of President Jacob Zuma, where she served in the Water and Sanitation portfolio throughout Zuma's second term. When Cyril Ramaphosa succeeded Zuma as President, he retained Mokonyane in his cabinet before demoting her after the 2019 general election. Mokonyane went on to lead the ANC's internal organising department at Luthuli House until her election to the Deputy Secretary-General post at the party's 55th National Conference in December 2022.

Known in the media as "Mama Action", Mokonyane has been a member of the ANC National Executive Committee since 2007 and formerly served on the national executive of the ANC Women's League and on the Central Committee of the South African Communist Party. In March 2022, the Zondo Commission recommended that Mokonyane should be prosecuted on charges of corruption in connection with allegations that she accepted bribes from Bosasa.

== Early life and activism ==
Mokonyane was born on 28 June 1963 in Kagiso, a township in Krugersdorp on the West Rand of the Transvaal (now part of Gauteng province). She had six elder sisters and five elder brothers. She matriculated at Mosupatsela Secondary School. In later years, she attended tertiary certificate courses in Sweden and the United States.

According to Mokonyane, she became active in the anti-apartheid struggle in the late 1970s at the age of fifteen, first as a member of the Young Christian Students and then as a founding member of the Congress of South African Students in 1979. In the 1980s, she was a member of the United Democratic Front; an organiser for the Federation of Transvaal Women (FEDTRAW); a shop steward in the Commercial, Catering and Allied Workers' Union of South Africa; and a leader in the civic movement of her hometown through the Kagiso Residents' Organisation. Journalist Ferial Haffajee later praised her "long history of community activism on the West Rand".

Mokonyane was arrested for her activism during the 1985 state of emergency, shortly after her wedding and while in the first trimester of a pregnancy. She gave birth while still detained under the Internal Security Act. In 1997, Mokonyane testified about her experience in detention while representing FEDTRAW at a women's hearing of the Truth and Reconciliation Commission.

== Provincial government ==
=== Member of the Executive Council: 1996–2009 ===
In South Africa's first post-apartheid election in 1994, Mokonyane was elected as an ordinary Member of the Gauteng Provincial Legislature. In 1996, she was appointed as a Member of the Executive Council (MEC) in the provincial government of Gauteng, with responsibility for agriculture, conservation and environment. In this capacity she championed a successful initiative to have Sterkfontein declared a World Heritage Site. In subsequent reshuffles of the Executive Council, she was appointed MEC for Safety and Liaison from 1999 to 2004 and then MEC for Housing from 2004 to 2009; she succeeded Paul Mashatile in both positions.

Over the same period, Mokonyane held various positions in her political party, the African National Congress (ANC). By 1997, she was the Regional Chairperson of the local ANC branch in the West Rand, and by 2007 she was a member of the Provincial Executive Committee of the ANC in Gauteng. She served on the national executive of the ANC Women's League and in February 1995 was one of eleven senior members of the league, reportedly led by Adelaide Tambo, who staged a walkout in protest of Winnie Madikizela-Mandela's leadership. She was also an active member of the South African Communist Party (SACP), a close partner of the ANC; she was Provincial Treasurer of the SACP in Gauteng by 1997 and ultimately served two terms on the SACP Central Committee from 1998 to 2007.

In October 2007, while Housing MEC, Mokonyane launched an unsuccessful campaign to succeed Mbhazima Shilowa as Provincial Chairperson of the ANC in Gauteng. At the party's provincial conference in October 2007, she was elected Deputy Provincial Chairperson instead, serving under Paul Mashatile. Later the same year, at the ANC's Polokwane conference in December 2007, she was elected for the first time to a seat on the party's National Executive Committee; by number of votes received, she was ranked 37th of the 80 candidates elected.

=== Premier of Gauteng: 2009–2014 ===
Mokonyane was Premier of Gauteng from 6 May 2009 to 20 May 2014. The fifth incumbent and the first woman to hold the position, she was elected unopposed after the 2009 general election, during which she was re-elected to her seat in the provincial legislature. She was nominated to the premiership by outgoing Premier Paul Mashatile, who was also a Member of the Provincial Legislature, but her election was presumably the result of an instruction to the ANC caucus from the ANC National Executive Committee, which had announced that Mokonyane was its preferred candidate. Her ascension to the position was viewed as a "slap in the face" for Mashatile, who remained senior to her inside the ANC.

In the months after her election, Mokonyane embarked on a controversial restructuring of the Gauteng provincial government. The Sowetan reported that the Gauteng ANC was divided by factionalism, with opposing groups aligned respectively to Mokonyane, Mashatile, and leadership contender Angie Motshekga. In particular, the Gauteng branch of the ANC Youth League protested Mokonyane's appointment, calling instead for Mashatile's re-election.

==== Bid for ANC Provincial Chair: 2010 ====
Ahead of the provincial ANC's next leadership elections, Mokonyane was presumed to have the support of the National Executive Committee in her bid to succeed Mashatile as ANC Provincial Chairperson. However, when the elective conference was held in May 2010, Mashatile won decisively, winning re-election by 531 votes to Mokonyane's 356. Mokonyane was succeeded as Deputy Provincial Chairperson by Gwen Ramokgopa and declined to seek re-election to an ordinary seat on the ANC Provincial Executive Committee. In the aftermath of the vote, in what was viewed as an assertion of dominance over Mokonyane's office, the newly elected ANC provincial executive instructed Mokonyane to reshuffle her Executive Council to elevate several of Mashatile's allies.

Nonetheless, Mokonyane was elected to another five-year term on the ANC National Executive Committee at the party's 53rd National Conference in December 2012; she was ranked 25th by popularity of the 80 elected candidates. According to the Africa Report, she played a key role at the conference when she, along with Ace Magashule and David Mabuza, convinced Cyril Ramaphosa to stand as Zuma's running mate, thus lending "credibility" to Zuma's bid for re-election as ANC President.

==== "Dirty votes" remark: 2013 ====
In October 2013, Mokonyane was criticised for remarks she made on a visit to Bekkersdal, Gauteng, during violent service delivery protests in the town. According to News24, she said of the protesters, "People can threaten us and say they won’t vote but the ANC doesn’t need their dirty votes"; she subsequently tried to apologise but was loudly heckled. In subsequent days, Mokonyane announced that the government would establish a multi-level task team to investigate allegations of corruption and improve administration in Bekkersdal.

==== Succession: 2014 ====
In 2013, Mokonyane indicated that she intended to run for re-election as Premier, but the ANC National Executive Committee reportedly snubbed her while considering candidates. In the 2014 general election, she was ranked eleventh on the ANC's party list in the provincial election; she was therefore re-elected to her seat in the provincial legislature, but was succeeded as Premier by David Makhura, who at the time was Mashatile's Provincial Secretary in the Gauteng ANC.

== National government ==
=== Minister of Water and Sanitation: 2014–2018 ===
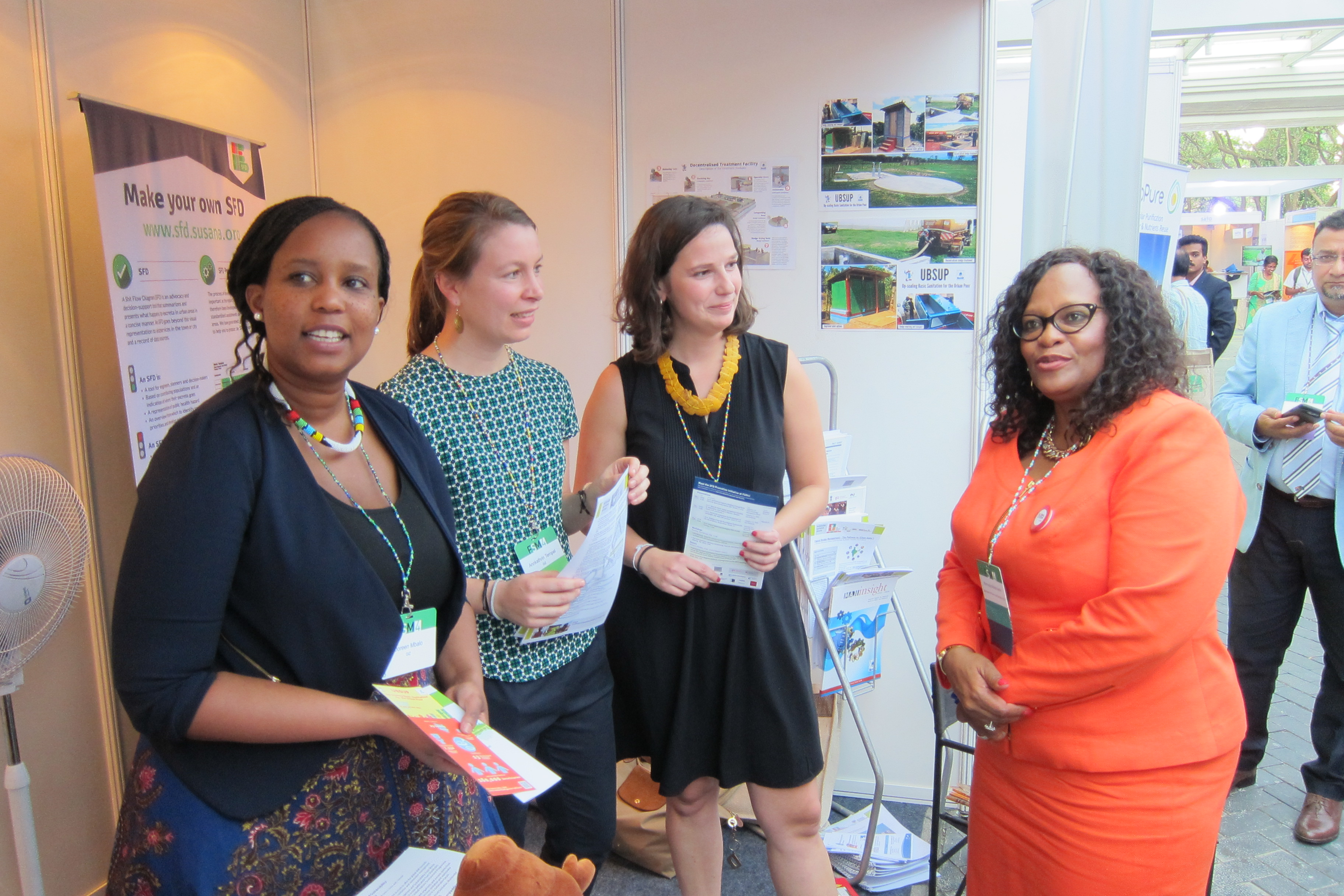
Mokonyane (far right) in February 2017

On 26 May 2014, pursuant to the general election, President Jacob Zuma appointed Mokonyane to his second cabinet as Minister of Water and Sanitation, a newly created ministry in the national government. As a result of this appointment, Mokonyane was not sworn in to the Gauteng Provincial Legislature; she also had not been elected to a seat in the national Parliament, but became one of the two ministers that Zuma was constitutionally permitted to appoint from outside the legislature. She held the portfolio until 26 February 2018.

City Press later described Mokonyane's tenure in the ministry as defined by "tremendous decline in investment in capital projects, the systematic destabilisation of water boards and the departure of key and senior personnel". Controversial decisions taken by Mokonyane included the R4-billion decision to delay Phase II of the Lesotho Highlands Water Project, which Mokonyane said was related to the need to ensure that the project served the imperative of economic transformation but which senior officials said was part of an attempt to ensure that related state contracts went to LTE Consulting, an ANC donor. Other LTE Consulting contracts with the Department of Water and Sanitation were subject to an investigation by the Special Investigating Unit in 2016. Also in 2016, the National Treasury expressed misgivings about Mokonyane's decision to merge two KwaZulu-Natal water boards, the Umgeni and Mhlathuze boards, into a single board to be overseen by Dudu Myeni.

In February 2017, City Press reported that the Department of Water and Sanitation was effectively bankrupt and that officials from the department and the National Treasury were lobbying for cabinet to place the department under administration. On the day that Mokonyane vacated the portfolio in February 2018, the Standing Committee on Public Accounts (Scopa) and the Portfolio Committee on Water and Sanitation announced a full parliamentary inquiry into alleged maladministration and corruption at the Department of Water and Sanitation, which Scopa chairperson Themba Godi said had "ceased to function like a normal department" and had "effectively been destroyed".

Despite the various controversies surrounding her activities in government, Mokonyane remained an influential figure in the ANC and was re-elected to a third five-year term on the ANC National Executive Committee at the party's 54th National Conference in December 2017; she was ranked 32nd of the 80 elected candidates. Ahead of the conference, she did not support Deputy President Cyril Ramaphosa's bid to succeed Zuma as ANC President; instead she supported the ill-fated campaign of Nkosazana Dlamini-Zuma. Indeed, for a period she was touted as a possible candidate to stand for ANC Treasurer-General on Dlamini-Zuma's slate.

=== Minister of Communications: 2018 ===
On 27 February 2018, Mokonyane was appointed Minister of Communications in a reshuffle of the cabinet by newly elected President Cyril Ramaphosa, who took office after Zuma resigned. While she was in this portfolio, in August 2018, Mokonyane was sworn in as a Member of the National Assembly, the lower house of the South African Parliament; she filled a casual vacancy in the house.

=== Minister of Environmental Affairs: 2018–2019 ===
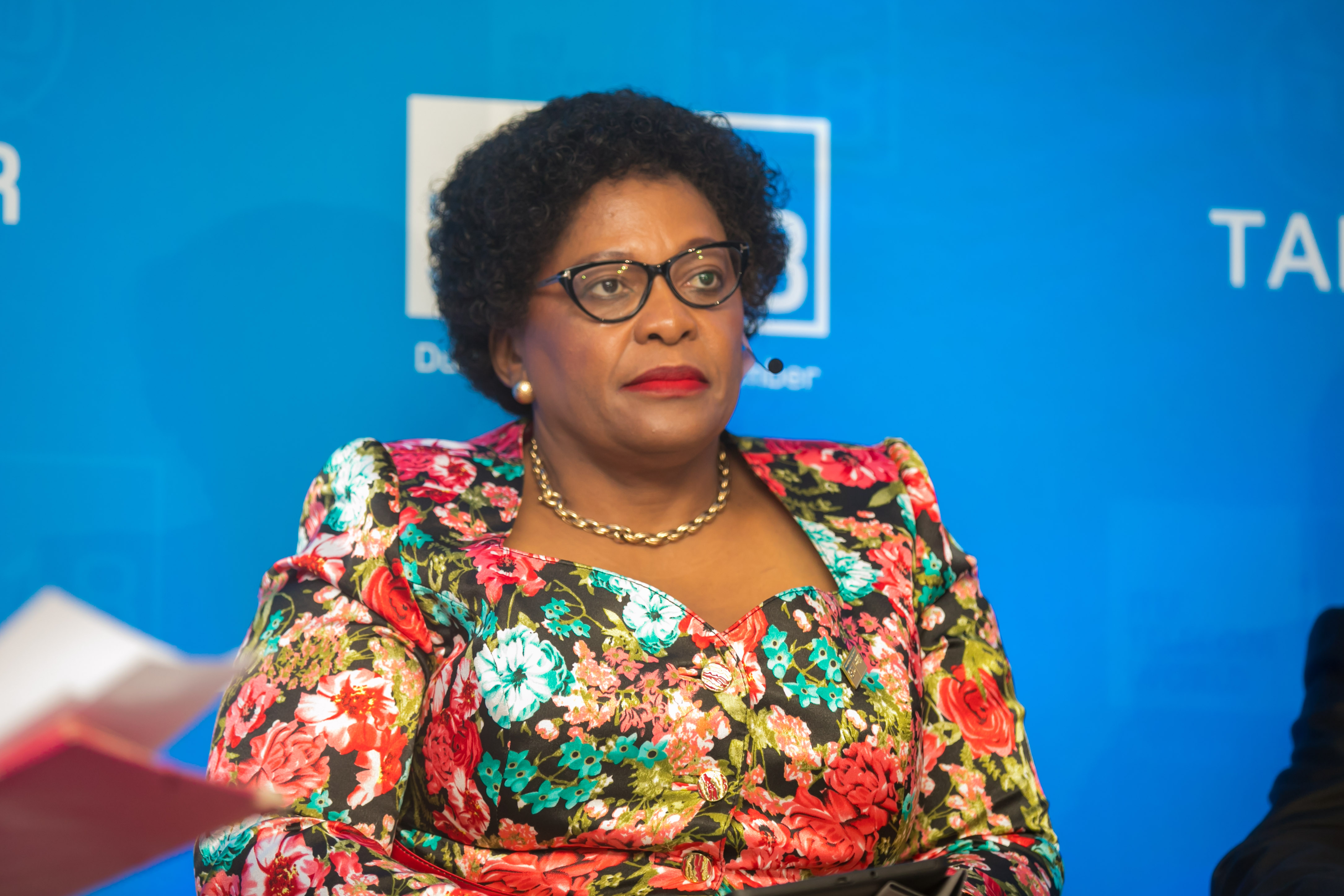
Mokonyane in September 2018

On 22 November 2018, in a minor reshuffle by Ramaphosa, Mokonyane was shifted to the Ministry of Environmental Affairs. Opposition parties, and the ANC's own ally the Congress of South African Trade Unions, responded by calling for Ramaphosa to drop Mokonyane from the cabinet entirely.

Mokonyane nevertheless remained in the cabinet until 25 May 2019, when Ramaphosa announced his new cabinet after his re-election in the 2019 general election. Mokonyane was listed tenth on the ANC's party list during the national election, securing Mokonyane her first full term in a seat in the National Assembly, and the ANC announced that Ramaphosa did not intend to reappoint her to cabinet but would instead nominate her to serve as a presiding officer in the assembly, as House Chairperson for Committees ("chair of chairs"). However, when Parliament opened, the ANC said that Mokonyane had withdrawn from the party list and would not be sworn into Parliament due to family responsibilities.

== Luthuli House ==
=== ANC Head of Organising: 2019–2022 ===
In May 2019, after Mokonyane declined to be sworn into Parliament, the ANC said that it would assign her to the party's headquarters at Luthuli House in Johannesburg. She was appointed to a full-time role as the ANC's Head of Organising, in which capacity she helped introduce a new digital system for recording party membership. Simultaneously, she completed her term on the ANC National Executive Committee, although in 2022 she was removed from her powerful position as chairperson of the party's internal National Disciplinary Committee of Appeal; she was replaced in that capacity by Johnny de Lange.

=== ANC Deputy Secretary-General: 2022 ===
Mokonyane remained head of organising until the party's 55th National Conference in December 2022, when she was elected First Deputy Secretary-General of the national ANC. She emerged as a frontrunner for the position during the nominations stage, when she was the favourite candidate of local party branches in her home province, Gauteng, and four other provinces (KwaZulu-Natal, Free State, Limpopo, and North West). Her candidacy was endorsed by the provincial leadership in Gauteng and KwaZulu-Natal, as well as by leaders of the ANC Youth League and ANC Women's League. At the conference, she won narrowly against Tina Joemat-Pettersson, the candidate favoured by Ramaphosa's allies; she earned 2,195 votes against Joemat-Pettersson's 2,145. As First Deputy Secretary-General, she serves alongside the Second Deputy Secretary-General, Maropene Ramokgopa, and under Secretary-General Fikile Mbalula; both Ramokgopa and Mbalula ran on the slate aligned to Ramaphosa and Joemat-Pettersson.

== Zondo Commission ==
=== Testimony ===
In 2019, Mokonyane was implicated in possible corruption by Angelo Agrizzi, the former chief operating officer at Bosasa. While testifying before the Zondo Commission, which was established to investigate allegations of state capture during Jacob Zuma's presidency, Agrizzi said that Bosasa had paid Mokonyane a monthly cash retainer as part of an attempt to curry favour with ANC politicians who could influence the allocation of state contracts. Other witnesses claimed that Bosasa had paid for a birthday party for Mokonyane, for her family's groceries, for security upgrades at her home, and possibly for her Aston Martin. When Mokonyane testified before the commission in July 2020, she admitted that she had been friendly with Bosasa chief executive Gavin Watson, but denied having received any bribes or personal gifts from Bosasa. The commission called her again in September 2020, after the owner of a guest house in Krugersdorp claimed that Mokonyane's 40th birthday party (in 2003) had been held at his property and had been financed by a R41,000 contribution from Bosasa. During the September hearings, Mokonyane said she had forgotten about the party in question and did not know who had paid for it.

=== Findings ===
In its report on Bosasa released on 1 March 2022, the Zondo Commission recommended that the National Prosecuting Authority should prosecute Mokonyane on charges of corruption. The report found that there were "clearly extensive attempts by Bosasa and its leaders, through various forms of inducement and gain, to influence Ms Mokonyane in her position as a member of the national executive, the provincial executive and office bearer in organs of state". According to the commission, there was sufficient prima facie evidence to establish that Mokonyane had accepted gratifications from Bosasa – particularly in respect of the cash payments, birthday party, and house upgrades – and moreover to establish that Mokonyane had been dishonest in denying knowledge of the inducements while testifying before the commission.

Mokonyane continued to deny the allegations, labelling them "total rubbish"; she said that the report "hurt, looking at what I sold for the freedom of this country, and what I'm still doing for the freedom of this country, in defence of the hard-won independence of this country". She accused the commission and its chairperson, Chief Justice Raymond Zondo, of meddling in politics, and announced that she intended to seek judicial review of the report.

== Personal life ==
Mokonyane is Catholic. She was married to Serge Mokonyane, whom she met in 1984 at a June 16 rally. At the time he was a United Democratic Front activist and trade union organiser in Munsieville, Krugersdorp – indeed, he was arrested with Mokonyane shortly after their wedding in 1985. After the end of apartheid, he was a businessman until his death in April 2019. They had three children and several grandchildren together. Their son, Retlabusa, died in November 2010 at the age of 23; Lindiwe Sisulu controversially told the Mail & Guardian that he had killed himself after being "persecuted" by the media.

Political offices
Preceded by Paul Mashatile	Premier of Gauteng; 6 May 2009 – 20 May 2014	Succeeded by David Makhura
