= Paul Mashatile =

Deputy President of South Africa since 2023

His Excellency Paul Mashatile MP
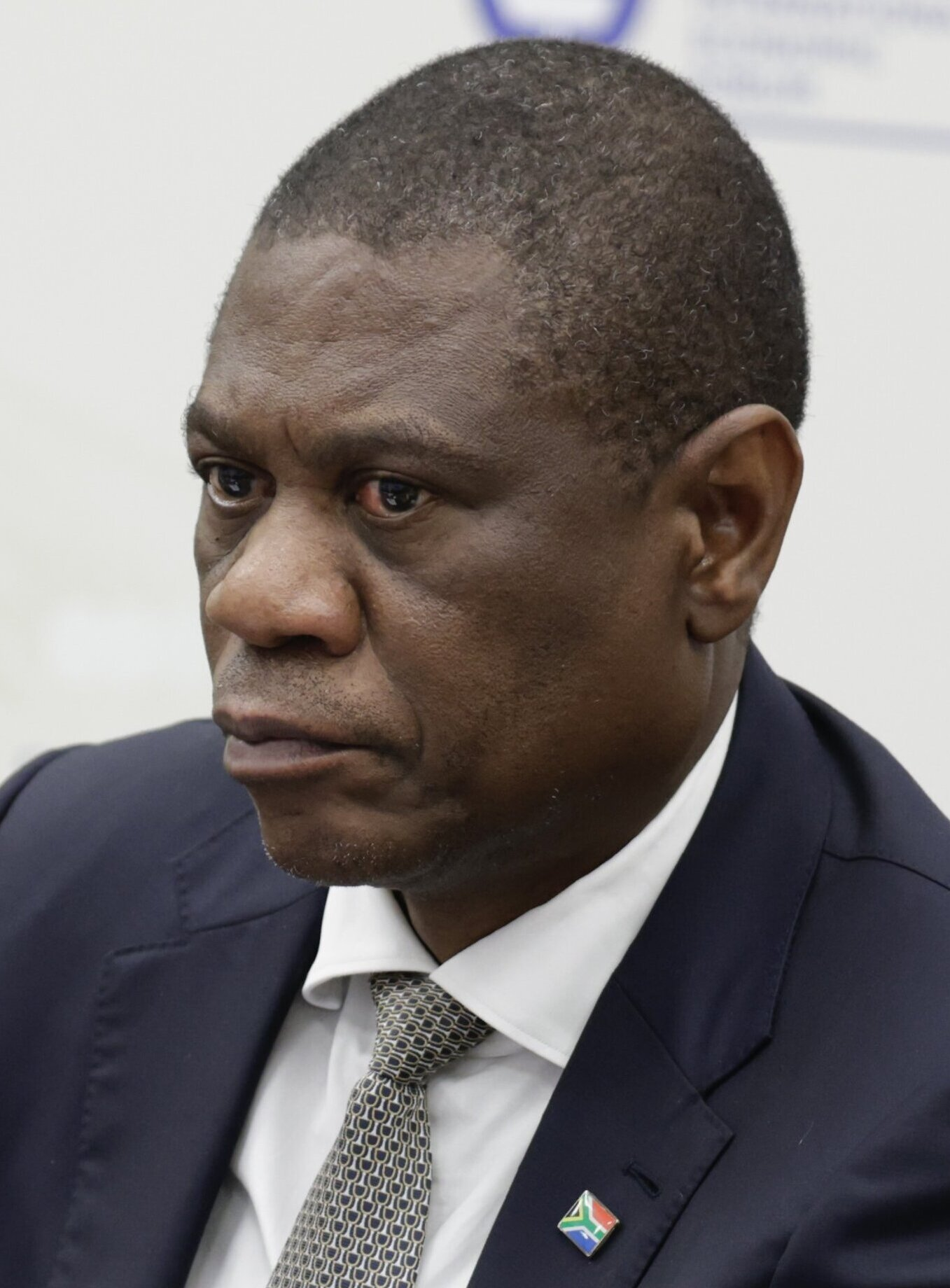
- Mashatile in 2025

9th Deputy President of South Africa
- Incumbent
- Assumed office 7 March 2023
- President: Cyril Ramaphosa
- Preceded by: David Mabuza

11th Deputy President of the African National Congress
- Incumbent
- Assumed office 19 December 2022
- President: Cyril Ramaphosa
- Preceded by: David Mabuza

Member of the National Assembly
- Incumbent
- Assumed office 1 February 2023
- Preceded by: Tshilidzi Munyai
- In office 2 November 2010 – 5 February 2016
- Preceded by: Mondli Gungubele
- Succeeded by: Doreen Senokoanyane
- Constituency: Gauteng

Minister of Arts and Culture
- In office 1 November 2010 – 25 May 2014
- President: Jacob Zuma
- Preceded by: Lulu Xingwana
- Succeeded by: Nathi Mthethwa

4th Premier of Gauteng
- In office 7 October 2008 – 6 May 2009
- Preceded by: Mbhazima Shilowa
- Succeeded by: Nomvula Mokonyane

Member of the Gauteng Provincial Legislature
- In office 27 April 1994 – May 2009
Prior party offices 1994‍–‍2022
Secretary-General of the African National Congress
Acting
In office 19 January 2022 – 19 December 2022 Serving with Jessie Duarte until 17 July 2022
President	Cyril Ramaphosa
Preceded by	Ace Magashule
Succeeded by	Fikile Mbalula
Treasurer-General of the African National Congress
In office 18 December 2017 – 19 December 2022
President	Cyril Ramaphosa
Preceded by	Zweli Mkhize
Succeeded by	Gwen Ramokgopa
Provincial Chairperson of the African National Congress in Gauteng
In office 7 October 2007 – 18 December 2017
Deputy	Nomvula Mokonyane; Gwen Ramokgopa; David Makhura
Preceded by	Mbhazima Shilowa
Succeeded by	David Makhura
Deputy Provincial Chairperson of the African National Congress in Gauteng
In office January 1998 – 1999
Chairperson	Mathole Motshekga
Preceded by	Mathole Motshekga
Succeeded by	Angie Motshekga
Provincial Secretary of the African National Congress in Gauteng
In office 7 May 1994 – 19 January 1998
Chairperson	Tokyo Sexwale
Preceded by	Position established
Succeeded by	Obed Bapela

Personal details
- Born: Paul Shipokosa Mashatile; 21 October 1961 (age 65) Gerhardsville, Transvaal, South Africa
- Party: African National Congress
- Other political affiliations: South African Communist Party (Tripartite Alliance)
- Spouses: Manzi Ellen (died 2020); Hlumile Mjongile (m. 2023)
- Occupation: Politician; activist

Paulus Shipokosa Mashatile (born 21 October 1961) is a South African politician who is the 9th deputy president of South Africa. He became deputy president of the governing African National Congress (ANC) in December 2022. Before his election to that position, he was ANC Treasurer-General from December 2017 and acting ANC Secretary-General from January 2022.

Formerly an anti-apartheid activist in the United Democratic Front, Mashatile was a member of President Jacob Zuma's first cabinet, serving as Minister of Arts and Culture from 2010 to 2014. Before that, he was briefly premier of Gauteng province from 2008 to 2009. Between 1996 and 2008, and later between 2014 and 2018, he held several ministerial portfolios in the Gauteng provincial government. He remains especially influential in Gauteng, his home province, where he was also ANC Provincial Chairperson between 2007 and 2017. He also served as acting president starting on 8 August when President Cyril Ramaphosa was out of the country. In 2025 he allegedly survived an assassination attempt.

== Early life and activism ==
Mashatile was born on 21 October 1961 in Gerhardsville, in what is now the municipality of Tshwane, in the Gauteng province. His mother was Marriam Nomvula Mashatile (b. 1937–1938, d. 2020). She was a domestic worker.

While a student, Mashatile began his political career as an anti-apartheid activist in Alexandra, Gauteng, alongside Obed Bapala and others. He was a member of the Congress of South African Students and co-founded the Alexandra Youth Congress, becoming the latter's inaugural president in 1983. In the same year, he represented the Alexandra Youth Congress at the launch of the United Democratic Front (UDF) in Cape Town, and two years later he succeeded Valli Moosa as UDF regional secretary for Southern Transvaal, a position which he held until the UDF was dissolved in 1991. Later in 1985, under the prevailing state of emergency, he was arrested for his political activism, and he was detained without trial until 1989.

== Rise in Gauteng ==
When the apartheid government unbanned the African National Congress (ANC) and South African Communist Party (SACP) in 1990, Mashatile was recruited to the interim leadership corps of both organisations and tasked with helping establish their new legal structures inside the country and especially in the PWV region that later became Gauteng, then led by trade unionist Kgalema Motlanthe. Observers have viewed this period as instrumental in solidifying Mashatile's support base and influence in the region. He was appointed interim regional secretary of the SACP in 1990, and was in charge of the ANC's political education programme in the region between 1991 and 1992. In 1992, he was elected Provincial Secretary of the Gauteng ANC, in which capacity he worked alongside Provincial Chairperson Tokyo Sexwale.

=== Provincial government ===
In South Africa's first democratic elections in 1994, he was elected to the Gauteng provincial legislature and became leader of the house. Two years later, Mashatile joined the provincial cabinet, where he served for the next 13 years, initially as Member of the Executive Council (MEC) for Transport and Public Works (1996–1998) and then as MEC for Safety and Security (1998–1999). Under Premier Mbhazima Shilowa, he occupied high-profile portfolios as MEC for Human Settlements (1999–2004) and for Finance and Economic Affairs (2004–2008). He was a close ally of Shilowa, viewed as the latter's right-hand man and protégé. As Finance MEC, he was closely involved in planning the Gautrain rapid-transit project, and also formulated and established the Gauteng Shared Services Centre, which centralised the budget allocations of provincial departments and which has been criticised as inefficient and vulnerable to corrupt abuses.

=== Provincial ANC ===
Over the same period, Mashatile ascended the ranks of the Gauteng ANC. He remained Provincial Secretary until 1998, when he was elected Deputy Provincial Chairperson under new Provincial Chairperson Mathole Motshekga. Mashatile was viewed as an opponent of Motshekga in ensuing years, during which the ANC's Provincial Executive Committee became divided over Motshekga's leadership, leading in 2000 to its dissolution by the ANC's National Executive Committee. In 2001, when the provincial party elected a new leadership, Mashatile was viewed as a possible successor to Motshekga, but ultimately stood for re-election to the deputy chairmanship and lost against Angie Motshekga, wife of Mathole. In 2004, he again contested the deputy chairmanship and was again beaten by Motshekga. However, he remained an ordinary member of the ANC's Provincial Executive Committee. He also remained a member of the SACP until at least 2007.

== ANC Gauteng Chairperson ==
=== Election: 2007 ===
At the provincial ANC's next elective conference in 2007, Mashatile launched a bid for the provincial chairmanship, the most senior position in the provincial party, running against fellow MECs Angie Motshekga and Nomvula Mokonyane. Motshekga was viewed as his primary competitor; the Mail & Guardian said that he represented "seniority" while Motshekga represented "those seeking a change of blood in the leadership". Another central issue in the campaign was the respective stance of the contestants on the question of leadership succession in the national ANC, which had grown heated in the run-up to the party's 52nd National Conference, to be held in Polokwane in December 2007. Mashatile was widely rumoured to support neither of the two main candidates – incumbent ANC President Thabo Mbeki and incumbent ANC Deputy President Jacob Zuma – but rather to support the underdog candidacy of Tokyo Sexwale. By contrast, his opponent in the provincial race, Motshekga, publicly supported Zuma, as did the ANC Youth League, which had nominated Mashatile for the provincial chair.

At the conference, which opened in Midrand on 7 October 2007, outgoing Provincial Chairperson Shilowa declined a nomination to stand for re-election; he was rumoured to support Mashatile's bid to succeed him. On the same day, Mashatile was elected ANC Provincial Chairperson, with Mokonyane as his deputy.

In his closing address to the conference, Mashatile told attendees that "In Gauteng there is no individual position, there is no Paul Mashatile position on who we will elect to the national leadership" in December, promising that the provincial party would enter into collective discussions to formulate a unified position. The province ultimately favoured Zuma in the nominations phase, and analyst Aubrey Matshiqi estimated that its support was divided between Mbeki and Zuma at the conference itself.

=== Premier of Gauteng: 2008–2009 ===
On 7 October 2008, Mashatile was elected Gauteng Premier, replacing Shilowa, who had resigned in protest against the ANC's decision to remove President Thabo Mbeki from office. However, Mashatile served as Premier for less than a year. On 6 May 2009, pursuant to the 2009 general election, he was replaced as Premier by his deputy in the ANC, Nomvula Mokonyane, and was appointed to the relatively junior position of Deputy Minister for Arts and Culture under newly elected President Jacob Zuma. This was viewed as a "slap in the face" for Mashatile, given his popularity in the province and ANC norms about reserving premierships for provincial party chairpersons. In subsequent months, the Sowetan reported that Mashatile faced division inside the provincial ANC, with some groups aligned to Mokonyane or the Motshekgas.

=== Minister of Arts and Culture: 2010–2014 ===
Mokonyane was also presumed to be the national ANC leadership's preferred candidate for ANC provincial chairperson, but at the elective conference of the Gauteng ANC in May 2010, Mashatile prevailed decisively, winning re-election by 531 votes to Mokonyane's 356. In the aftermath of the vote, in what was viewed as an assertion of dominance over Mokonyane's office, the newly elected ANC provincial executive instructed Mokonyane to reshuffle her cabinet to elevate three of Mashatile's allies: Lebogang Maile, Ntombi Mekgwe, and Humphrey Mmemezi. Also in the aftermath, on 31 October 2010, Zuma announced Mashatile's promotion to Minister of Arts and Culture. Mashatile was sworn into the National Assembly in order to take up the position.

=== Bid for ANC Treasury: 2012 ===
By mid-2012, there were reports that Mashatile was using his influence within the party to lobby for Zuma's deposition and possibly for his own elevation to a national leadership position. The Gauteng ANC, and Mashatile personally, publicly supported leadership change in the ANC ahead of the 53rd National Conference of the ANC in December 2012. At the conference, Mashatile stood for national Treasurer General on a slate aligned to presidential challenger Kgalema Motlanthe. Like Motlanthe, he lost the vote resoundingly, and Zweli Mkhize was appointed Treasurer General by 2,988 votes to his 961. He also failed to gain enough votes to win election to the party's National Executive Committee, although he remained an ex officio member of the committee in his capacity as Provincial Chairperson.

Pursuant to the 2014 elections, Zuma was re-elected as national president and sacked Mashatile from his second-term cabinet. Mashatile retreated to the backbenches of the National Assembly, where he served as chair of the appropriations committee. He was also re-elected, unopposed, as ANC Gauteng Chairperson in October 2014. He left the national legislature in February 2016, when he was appointed MEC for Human Settlements and Cooperative Governance in the cabinet of Gauteng Premier David Makhura, a close ally. He served in the provincial cabinet until early 2018, when he took up the full-time party position of ANC Treasurer General. In the interim, he remained a fairly staunch opponent of Zuma: after the 2016 Constitutional Court judgement on Zuma's misconduct in the Nkandla saga, Mashatile spearheaded the Gauteng ANC's call for Zuma to step down, a call he later repeated in the week before Zuma was recalled by the ANC.

== In the national ANC ==
=== ANC Treasurer General: 2017–2022 ===
On 18 December 2017, Mashatile was elected Treasurer General of the ANC at the latter's 54th National Conference, which also marked the end of Zuma's term as party president. Mashatile won 2,517 votes, against 2,178 for Maite Nkoana-Mashabane. He ran on the slate of winning presidential candidate Cyril Ramaphosa, and reportedly partnered with David Mabuza in negotiating access to that slate. Some commentators have said that Mashatile had a long-running and instrumental role in engineering Ramaphosa's ascent.

The Treasurer General position was a full-time post based out of the ANC's headquarters at Luthuli House in Johannesburg. In January 2022, with Secretary General Ace Magashule on suspension and Deputy Secretary General Jessie Duarte on sick leave, Mashatile was appointed acting ANC Secretary General; he continued in the position after Duarte's death in July.

=== ANC Deputy President: 2022– ===
On 19 December 2022 at the ANC's 55th National Conference, Mashatile was elected ANC Deputy President, serving under Ramaphosa. By mid-2022 he was widely expected to contest for one of the party's top leadership positions, possibly even the presidency. He emerged as a frontrunner for the deputy presidency during the nominations phase: he was the favoured candidate of branches in seven of the party's nine provinces, with the exception of the Eastern Cape, which favoured Oscar Mabuyane, and Mpumalanga, which favoured Ronald Lamola. At the conference, he earned just over 50% of the vote, receiving 2,178 votes against Mabuyane's 1,858 and Lamola's 315.

=== Deputy President of South Africa ===
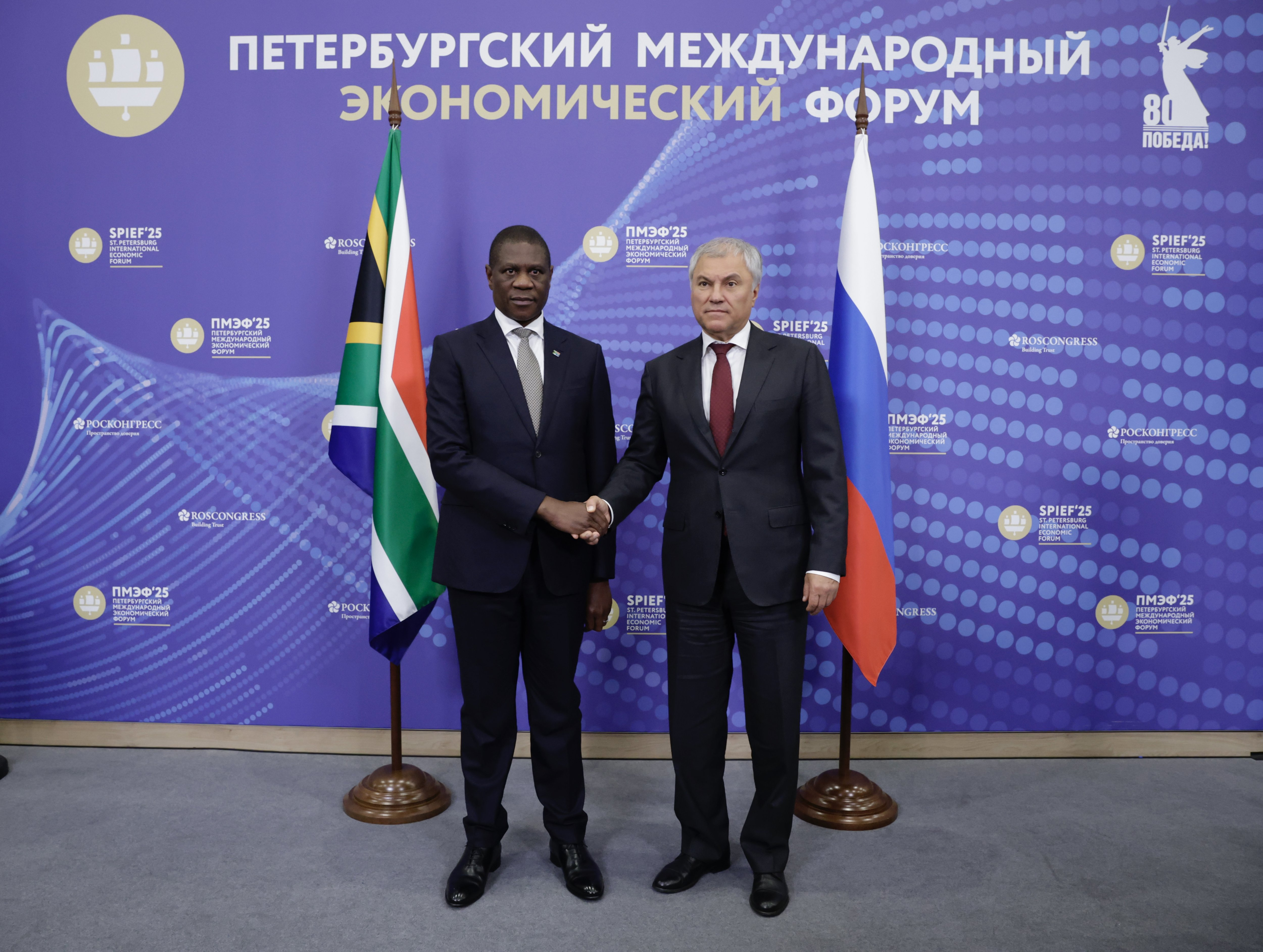
Mashatile meeting with the Chairman of the Russian State Duma Vyacheslav Volodin, 20 June 2025

Mashatile was appointed Deputy President of South Africa by President Cyril Ramaphosa after the resignation on David Mabuza. Upon appointing Mashatile, Ramaphosa assigned a number of functions to him, appointing Mashatile as Leader of Government Business in the Parliament of South Africa, Chairperson of South African National Aids Council, as well as the Chairperson of the Human Resource Development Council of South Africa. Mashatile was also appointed as special envoy to South Sudan. A number of pundits made comments on Ramaphosa's appointment of Mashatile and the type of leader he would likely be, with some pundits believing Mashatile would be a better Deputy President than his predecessor, David Mabuza who had been notorious for long absenteeism from official government and public events.

In March 2024, Mashatile stood in for President Ramaphosa by attending the Proudly South African Presidential Localization Dinner at the Sandton Convention Centre in Johannesburg. The summit aimed at promoting support of local products.

Mashatile made a trip to the United Kingdom, to meet with high level government officials, executives of big corporations as well as SMMEs and start-ups. The trip was meant to rally investors into South Africa.

In August 2025, following an announcement that Mashatile had not declared a diamond gifted to his wife by diamond dealer Louis Liebenberg, the Parliamentary Joint Ethics Committee decided to sanction him. President Ramaphosa distanced himself from the issue, stating that Mashatile should answer for himself. The issue sparked calls for increased government accountability. The Democratic Alliance called for a probe into Mashatile, saying the Parliamentary rebuke and fine was not enough.

== Controversies ==
=== "Alex mafia" ===
Mashatile has frequently been identified as a leading member of the so-called "Alex mafia" – a term whose use was banned in the Gauteng legislature in 2010, and which refers to a network of politicians and businesspeople with personal ties originating in Alexandra township's anti-apartheid movement. Other putative members of the "mafia" include Nkenke Kekana and Mike Maile, the brother of Gauteng politician Lebogang Maile. In 2006, the Mail & Guardian reported that such ties might have led Mashatile to acquire shares in a software company with state contracts, possibly creating a conflict of interest. The Gauteng Integrity Commissioner, Jules Browde, cleared Mashatile of any impropriety in December that year, finding that Mashatile had never exercised his share option and had declared the shares erroneously.

=== Restaurant expenses ===
In June 2006, Mashatile, then Finance MEC, caused a minor scandal when he spent R96,000, charged to his government credit card, on a single dinner for government employees at an upmarket French restaurant in Sandton. The Star newspaper reported that Mashatile had incurred more than R250,000 in "entertainment" expenses between February and June of that year. Two months later, Mashatile hosted another government dinner at the same restaurant, at a higher cost of R108,000, and his spokesperson inflamed the scandal by falsely denying the reports. In an ensuing investigation, the Gauteng Integrity Commissioner again cleared Mashatile, this time of allegations that he had misused his government credit card or fraudulently under-reported his expenditures.

=== Alexandra Renewal Project ===
Ahead of the 2019 general election, controversy arose around claims that the Gauteng government had wasted – or its politicians pilfered – R1.3 billion in funds intended for the Alexandra Renewal Project, a welfare scheme coordinated by Mashatile's department during his first term as Human Settlements MEC (1999–2004). In the course of a joint inquiry by the Public Protector and South African Human Rights Commission, Mashatile and other officials denied that any such amount had gone missing or been allocated in the first place. Mashatile filed a R2-million defamation lawsuit against opposition party the Economic Freedom Fighters and two of its leaders, Julius Malema and Mandisa Mashego, after they implied that he had been involved in corruption in administering the Alexandra Renewal Project.

=== N1 Civilian assault ===
In July 2023, eight of Mashatile's VIP protection unit confronted a motorist and passenger on the N1 highway near Johannesburg. A video was captured and shared on social media platforms. The officers – Shadrack Kojoana, Johannes Mampuru, Posmo Mofokeng, Harmans Ramokhonami, Phineas Boshielo, Churchill Mkhize, Lesiba Ramabu, and Moses Fhatuwani, were charged with assault with intent to cause grievous bodily harm, malicious damage to property, reckless driving, and obstruction of justice. In May 2025 a police disciplinary inquiry found the eight guards not guilty of assault.

== Personal life ==
Mashatile has two sons and two daughters. His wife, Manzi Ellen Mashatile, died in July 2020. In November 2020, he launched the Manzi Mashatile Foundation to promote educational programmes in her memory.

Political offices
Preceded by Mbhazima Shilowa	Premier of Gauteng; 2008–2009	Succeeded by Nomvula Mokonyane
Preceded by Lulu Xingwana	Minister of Arts and Culture; 2010–2014	Succeeded by Nathi Mthethwa
Party political offices
Preceded by Mbhazima Shilowa	Provincial Chairperson of the Gauteng African National Congress; 2007–2017	Succeeded by David Makhura
Preceded by Zweli Mkhize	Treasurer General of the African National Congress; 2017–2022	Succeeded by Gwen Ramokgopa
Preceded by David Mabuza	Deputy President of the African National Congress; 2022–present	Incumbent
Preceded by David Mabuza	Deputy President of South Africa; 2023-present	Incumbent
