= Premier of Gauteng =

Local chief executive of Gauteng

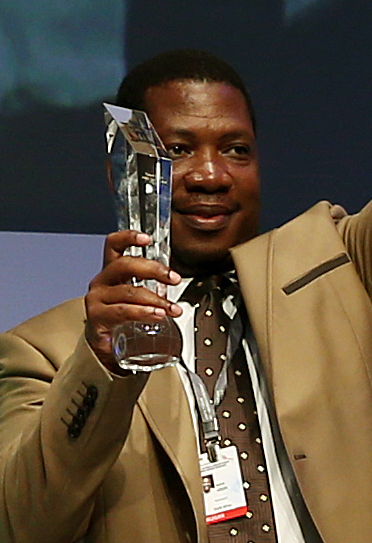
- Incumbent; Panyaza Lesufi since 6 October 2022
- Gauteng Government
- Style: Premier; The Honourable
- Type: Head of government
- Member of: National Council of Provinces; Member of the Executive Council
- Seat: Johannesburg
- Appointer: Gauteng Provincial Legislature
- Term length: Five years, renewable once
- Constituting instrument: Constitution of South Africa
- Inaugural holder: Tokyo Sexwale
- Formation: 7 May 1994
- Salary: R2,3 million
- Website: Official website

The premier of Gauteng is the head of government of the Gauteng province of South Africa. The current premier of Gauteng is Panyaza Lesufi, a member of the African National Congress, who was elected on 6 October 2022, following the resignation of David Makhura.

== Functions ==
In terms of the constitution, the executive authority of a province is vested in the premier. The premier appoints an Executive Council made up of ten members of the provincial legislature; they are known as Members of the Executive Council (MECs). The MECs are effectively ministers and the Executive Council a cabinet at the provincial level. The premier has the warrant to appoint and dismiss MECs at his/her own discretion.

The premier and the Executive Council are responsible for implementing provincial legislation, along with any national legislation assigned to the province. They set provincial policy and manage the departments of the provincial government; their actions are subject to the national constitution.

In order for an act of the provincial legislature to become law, the premier must sign it. If he/she believes that the act is unconstitutional, it can be referred back to the legislature for reconsideration. If the premier and the legislature cannot agree, the act must be referred to the Constitutional Court for a final decision.

The premier is also ex officio a member of the National Council of Provinces, the upper house of Parliament, as one of the special delegates from the province.

== List ==
No.	Portrait	Name (Birth–Death)	Term of office			Political party
No.	Portrait	Name (Birth–Death)	Took office	Left office	Time in office	Political party
1		Tokyo Sexwale (born 1953)	7 May 1994	19 January 1998	3 years, 257 days	African National Congress
2		Mathole Motshekga (born 1949)	19 January 1998	15 June 1999	1 year, 147 days	African National Congress
3		Mbhazima Shilowa (born 1958)	15 June 1999	29 September 2008	9 years, 106 days	African National Congress
4		Paul Mashatile (born 1961)	7 October 2008	6 May 2009	211 days	African National Congress
5		Nomvula Mokonyane (born 1963)	6 May 2009	21 May 2014	5 years, 15 days	African National Congress
6		David Makhura (born 1968)	21 May 2014	6 October 2022	8 years, 138 days	African National Congress
7		Panyaza Lesufi (born 1968)	6 October 2022	Incumbent	3 years, 336 days	African National Congress

== Election ==
The election for the Gauteng Provincial Legislature is held every five years, simultaneously with the election of the National Assembly; the last such election occurred on 29 May 2024. At the first meeting of the provincial legislature after an election, the members choose the premier from amongst themselves. The provincial legislature can force the premier to resign by a motion of no confidence. If the premiership becomes vacant (for whatever reason) the provincial legislature must choose a new premier to serve out the period until the next election. One person cannot have served more than two five-year terms as premier; however, when a premier is chosen to fill a vacancy the time until the next election does not count as a term.

== See also ==
- Premier (South Africa)
- President of South Africa
- Politics of South Africa
