= David Makhura =

6th Premier of Gauteng, South Africa

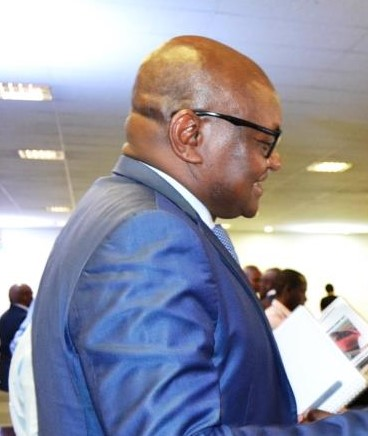
- Makhura in March 2019

6th Premier of Gauteng
- In office 21 May 2014 – 5 October 2022
- Preceded by: Nomvula Mokonyane
- Succeeded by: Panyaza Lesufi

Provincial Chairperson of the African National Congress in Gauteng
- In office 21 July 2018 – 27 June 2022
- Deputy: Panyaza Lesufi
- Preceded by: Paul Mashatile
- Succeeded by: Panyaza Lesufi
Party offices 2001–2018
Deputy Provincial Chairperson of the African National Congress in Gauteng
In office 4 October 2014 – 21 July 2018
Chairperson	Paul Mashatile
Preceded by	Gwen Ramokgopa
Succeeded by	Panyaza Lesufi
Provincial Secretary of the African National Congress in Gauteng
In office November 2001 – 4 October 2014
Deputy	Mandla Nkomfe; Humphrey Mmemezi
Chairperson	Sam Shilowa; Paul Mashatile
Preceded by	Obed Bapela
Succeeded by	Hope Papo

Personal details
- Born: Manemolla David Makhura; 22 February 1968 (age 58) Mara Buysdorp, Northern Transvaal; South Africa
- Party: African National Congress
- Spouse: Mpho Makhura
- Education: University of the North; University of London

Manemolla David Makhura (born 22 February 1968) is a South African politician who served as the sixth Premier of Gauteng from May 2014 to October 2022. Since his resignation from that office, he has worked as head of political education for his political party, the African National Congress (ANC). He was elected to a five-year term on the ANC National Executive Committee in December 2022.

Born and educated in Limpopo, Makhura entered politics as a student activist and was the president of the South African Students Congress from 1994 to 1996. Between 1998 and 2001, while also serving as a member of the national executive of the ANC Youth League, he was the deputy general secretary of the National Education, Health and Allied Workers' Union. He rose to national prominence as the provincial secretary of the Gauteng branch of the ANC, a position he held continuously between November 2001 and October 2014.

He became Premier of Gauteng after the May 2014 general election and was elected to a second term after the May 2019 general election. His administration's policy platform emphasized economic modernisation and growth, notably through its programme of revitalising the township economy. However, his tenure also coincided with various controversies in the provincial healthcare sector, including the Life Esidimeni tragedy of 2016 and, in the aftermath of the COVID-19 pandemic, a series of scandals related to corruption in healthcare procurement.

While serving as premier, Makhura served as the ANC's provincial chairperson from July 2018 to June 2022. However, he did not seek a second term as provincial chairperson in June 2022; instead he resigned from the premiership in October of that year so that Panyaza Lesufi, who had succeeded him in his ANC office, could take over the government office too. Shortly thereafter he was elected to the ANC National Executive Committee and recruited to full-time party work at Luthuli House, where he is the ANC's head of political education, its head of coalition governance, and the principal of its political school, the O. R. Tambo School of Leadership.

== Early life and education ==
Makhura was born on 22 February 1968 at Mara Buysdorp in the Soutpansberg of the former Northern Transvaal, a region that later became part of Limpopo Province. Both of his parents later moved to present-day Gauteng for work.

As a teenager, from around 1984, he became active in student politics in the anti-apartheid movement, joining the Azanian Student Movement and later the Congress of South African Students and South African Youth Congress. He was recruited into underground structures of the banned African National Congress (ANC) and South African Communist Party (SACP) in 1986 and 1987 respectively.

As a student at the University of the North at Turfloop, Makhura was twice the president of the student representative council, in 1990 and in 1992, and he went on to leadership positions in the South African Students Congress (SASCO), both as secretary general and, from 1994 to 1996, as national president. He did not graduate from Turfloop but later completed a Master of Science in public policy and management at the University of London.

== Early political career ==
Between 1997 and 2001, Makhura was active in the trade union movement in the leadership of the National Education, Health and Allied Workers' Union (Nehawu): he entered as the union's national education secretary and then, in April 1998, was elected as the union's deputy general secretary, serving under newly elected general secretary Fikile Majola. During the same period he was a member of the Central Executive Committee of the Congress of South African Trade Unions. In 2000, the Mail & Guardian named him one of its "top 100 stars of the future".

At the same time, Makhura remained active in youth politics as a member of the National Executive Committee of the ANC Youth League between 1998 and 2004. He was also the inaugural convener of the SACP's National Youth Desk, a precursor to what became the party's Young Communist League. In 2001, he spearheaded an unsuccessful challenge to oust Malusi Gigaba from the league presidency, with Mahlengi Bhengu as his running mate and various former SASCO colleagues as his backers. Gigaba's backers framed the campaign as an "ultra-leftist" coup by opponents of President Thabo Mbeki, and Gigaba prevailed at the Youth League's elective conference in Bloemfontein in April 2001.

However, later that year, in November 2001, Makhura was elected unopposed as the provincial secretary of the ANC's branch in Gauteng. He had never served in the mainstream ANC's provincial executive before, but he had been appointed as interim coordinator of the branch in 2000 after Mathole Motshekga's leadership corps was disbanded. He went on to hold the provincial secretary position, a full-time position, until October 2014, gaining re-election to four consecutive three-year terms; he served the first two terms under provincial chairperson Sam Shilowa and the latter two terms under provincial chairperson Paul Mashatile. He worked closely with Mashatile, particularly as the provincial party became increasingly strident in its criticism of ANC president Jacob Zuma.

== Premier of Gauteng: 2014–2022 ==
In the May 2014 general election, Makhura was elected to the Gauteng Provincial Legislature, ranked first on the ANC's party list. In the aftermath of the election, on 20 May, the ANC announced that its caucus in the legislature would elect Makhura as Premier of Gauteng. The announcement was a surprise to many observers and was the product of political compromise: because of the deteriorating relationship between the Gauteng ANC and the national ANC leadership, the most obvious candidates – the incumbent premier, Nomvula Mokonyane, and Mashatile himself – were ruled out, and the Gauteng party nominated three compromise candidates: Makhura, Barbara Creecy, and Ntombi Mekgwe. Of this shortlisted trio, Makhura was regarded as the preferred candidate of the Gauteng party and Mekgwe was regarded as the likely preference of the national leadership; Makhura's appointment was therefore viewed as a considerable political coup for Mashatile and Makhura.

Makhura was sworn in to office on 21 May, becoming Gauteng's youngest premier to date. He served in the office until October 2022: he became the ANC's candidate for premier in the May 2019 election campaign, and he was re-elected by the newly elected provincial legislature on 22 May, defeating an opposition challenge by Solly Msimanga of the Democratic Alliance.

=== Economic policies ===
During his first State of the Province Address, delivered in Thokoza in June 2014, Makhura said that the three pillars of his administration would be radical economic transformation, spatial transformation, and economic modernisation, and he linked all three pillars to the revitalisation and mainstreaming of township economies. After a summit on township economies in October 2014, Makhura announced a plan to invest R1 billion in township infrastructure over the next five years, towards the goal that economic growth in townships should account for 30 per cent of the province's economic growth during his administration. The so-called Township Economy Revitalisation Programme remained a cornerstone policy of Makhura's second term and it was generally well received. One major prong of the strategy was funneling government procurement funds to township enterprises; between 2014 and 2018, the Gauteng Government's procurement spend on contracts with township enterprises increased from R600 million to R17 billion. During his February 2018 State of the Province Address, Makhura expanded the township programme to include scrutiny of foreign-owned businesses in townships; he announced a drive to inspect and "shut down" any such businesses operating illegally.

Another initiative announced in Makhura's first State of the Province Address was the establishment of a panel to review the impact of the e-tolling policy. In later years he became an unequivocal critic of the policy. Indeed, in November 2018, Makhura joined civil society organisations in a march on the Union Buildings that called on the national government to scrap e-tolls; he said that he was marching in his ANC capacity, not his government capacity, and "Those who are in government will have to be put under pressure by the ANC." However, the e-tolls remained in place throughout Makhura's premiership, and some commentators were disappointed by his failure to drive change in the policy.

Makhura's other economic policies included the establishment of special economic zones. In all, during his first term as premier, the Gauteng economy attracted R199 billion in new foreign direct investment and R53 billion in new government investment in infrastructure, and employment in the province rose from 4.4 million to 5.1 million.

=== Healthcare scandals ===
For many observers, the largest scandal of Makhura's administration was the Life Esidimeni scandal: the 2016 revelations that dozens of psychiatric patients had died in under-resourced and unlicensed private care homes after being moved to those homes as part of the policy of deinstitutionalisation adopted by the Gauteng Department of Health under the leadership of Makhura's provincial health minister, Qedani Mahlangu. In his report on the scandal, health ombudsman Malegapuru Makgoba found that Makhura had not been responsible for the deinstitutionalisation policy or aware of the fatalities. On Makgoba's recommendation, Makhuru and national Health Minister Aaron Motsoaledi appointed an independent task team to lead a turnaround intervention in the Gauteng Department of Health, but the task team's report and recommendations, finalised in 2018, were not made public. In May 2018, the opposition Democratic Alliance tabled a motion of no confidence in Makhura's leadership, framed as a means of exerting accountability for the Life Esidimeni tragedy; the motion failed by 38 votes to 27 in the ANC-controlled legislature. In later years Makhura continued to deny responsibility for the tragedy.

Makhura was also premier during the COVID-19 pandemic. At the height of the pandemic, he was broadly commended for his "on-the-ground style of leadership". However, in 2021 and 2022, the province was wreaked by corruption scandals relating to PPE procurement. Most notably, a Special Investigating Unit probe into procurement corruption at Tembisa Hospital in Tembisa, Gauteng resulted in the murder of Babita Deokaran in August 2021. The Tembisa investigation was later widened to include pre-pandemic contracts, and a 2022 Mail & Guardian investigation suggested that Makhura had known of and concealed the alleged misconduct of a hospital executive. Makhura denied any knowledge of such misconduct. According to Makhura, subsequent investigations into the provincial health department uncovered "structural and systemic problems", including a "culture of irregular processes", in health procurement in the province.

=== Party chairmanship ===
At the outset of his premiership, Makhura officially remained the provincial secretary of the ANC, but a party elective conference in October 2014 elected him to the position of deputy provincial chairperson. Mashatile was re-elected as provincial chairperson at the same conference, and Hope Papo was elected to succeed Makhura as provincial secretary. Makhura declined a nomination to challenge Mashatile for the chairmanship at the conference. In subsequent years, the pair continued to work closely together, though there were reports that their relationship grew strained in 2016 when Mashatile returned to Gauteng from the national government to serve in Makhura's Executive Council.

In December 2017, Mashatile was elected as national treasurer-general of the ANC, and Makhura became acting provincial chairperson in his stead. The provincial party held its next elective conference in Irene six months later; on 21 July 2018 Makhura was officially elected as ANC provincial chairperson, running unopposed after Sputla Ramokgopa declined a nomination to stand against him. After a hard-fought contest with Lebogang Maile, Panyaza Lesufi was elected to succeed Makhura as deputy provincial chairperson. Maile's faction, which dominated the newly elected Provincial Executive Committee, was viewed as hostile to Makhura's leadership.

After Makhura won re-election to his second term as premier in 2019, he said publicly that he intended to serve only one term as ANC provincial chairperson. He therefore did not stand for re-election in 2022, though he acknowledged that the election of a new party leader might create two centres of power, making it politically untenable for him to stay on as premier. At the next elective conference on 27 June 2022, Lesufi was elected as provincial chairperson after another close contest with Maile.

=== Resignation ===
In early September 2022, Makhura announced that he would resign from the premiership once the ANC had selected his successor, though he denied reports that Lesufi's provincial executive was forcing him to resign. He announced his resignation on 4 October, and Lesufi was elected to succeed him on 6 October. There was speculation, ultimately unfounded, that Makhura would seek a top leadership position in the national ANC.

== Luthuli House: 2023–present ==
In December 2022, Makhura attended the ANC's 55th National Conference at Nasrec, which elected him to a five-year term on the party's National Executive Committee. He received 1,772 votes across roughly 4,000 ballots, making him the tenth-most popular member of the 80-member committee. At the committee's first meeting in February 2023, Makhura was named as the party's head of political education, a position that would involve full-time work at ANC headquarters at Luthuli House. He was also appointed as deputy chairperson of the drafting subcommittee, under subcommittee chairperson Thoko Didiza, and as chairperson of a new subcommittee on coalition governance. In October 2023, he was additionally appointed to replace David Masondo as principal of the O. R. Tambo School of Leadership, the ANC's political school.

Masondo pushed for significant internal reforms in these positions, adopting President Cyril Ramaphosa's platform of party "renewal". In April 2023, he published a set of guidelines for future coalition negotiations, and the Daily Maverick reported that in November 2023 he tabled a proposal recommending that the ANC should not form governments with either the Economic Freedom Fighters or the Patriotic Alliance. After the May 2024 general election, in which the ANC lost its majority in both the Gauteng Provincial Legislature and the National Assembly, he and secretary-general Fikile Mbalula led the ANC's delegation to the negotiations that resulted in the formation of the Government of National Unity. In the aftermath of the election, in October 2024, he launched a new five-module course in political education that would henceforth be mandatory for all ANC members.

== Personal life ==
Makhura is a trustee of the Ahmed Kathrada Foundation. His wife is Mpho Makhura; they have three children.

On 10 July 2020, he announced that he had tested positive for COVID-19, becoming the third premier in one week to test positive for the virus.

Political offices
Preceded by Nomvula Mokonyane	Premier of Gauteng; 2014 – 2022	Succeeded by Panyaza Lesufi
