= Panyaza Lesufi =

South African politician

Panyaza Lesufi MPL
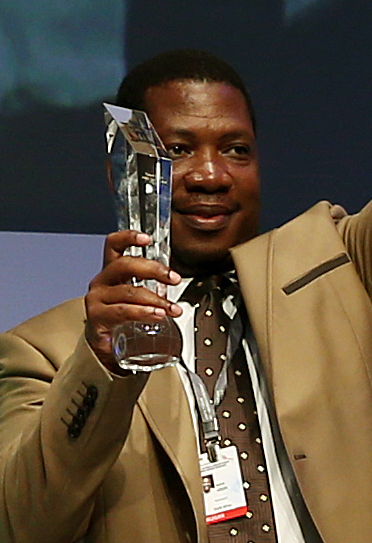
- Lesufi in 2014

7th Premier of Gauteng
- Incumbent
- Assumed office 6 October 2022
- Preceded by: David Makhura

Chairperson of the African National Congress in Gauteng
- Incumbent
- Assumed office 27 June 2022
- Deputy: Nomantu Nkomo-Ralehoko
- Preceded by: David Makhura

Gauteng MEC for Education
- In office 31 May 2019 – 6 October 2022
- Premier: David Makhura
- Preceded by: Nomantu Nkomo-Ralehoko
- Succeeded by: Matome Chiloane
- In office 23 May 2014 – 29 May 2019
- Premier: David Makhura
- Preceded by: Barbara Creecy
- Succeeded by: Nomantu Nkomo-Ralehoko

Acting Gauteng MEC for Social Development
- In office 5 November 2019 – 19 June 2020
- Premier: David Makhura
- Preceded by: Thuliswa Nkabinde-Khawe
- Succeeded by: Nomathemba Mokgethi

Gauteng MEC for Finance and e-Government
- In office 30 May 2019 – 31 May 2019
- Premier: David Makhura
- Preceded by: Barbara Creecy
- Succeeded by: Nomantu Nkomo-Ralehoko

Member of the Gauteng Provincial Legislature
- Incumbent
- Assumed office 21 May 2014

Personal details
- Born: Andrek Lesufi; 4 September 1968 (age 58) Edenvale, South Africa
- Party: African National Congress
- Other political affiliations: South African Communist Party
- Education: University of Natal
- Occupation: Politician

Andrek "Panyaza" Lesufi (born 4 September 1968) is a South African politician who was appointed the seventh Premier of Gauteng in October 2022. He was previously Member of the Executive Council (MEC) for Education in the Gauteng provincial government between May 2014 and October 2022, with the exception of a two-day stint as MEC for Finance in May 2019. Simultaneously, he was acting MEC for Social Development between November 2019 and June 2020.

A former anti-apartheid and education activist, Lesufi began his political career in public administration and communications in the government of Ekurhuleni, Gauteng and in the national government, where he worked in the Department of Basic Education from 2009 to 2014. He was first elected to the Gauteng Provincial Legislature in 2014. He is a member of the African National Congress (ANC) and has served on its Gauteng Provincial Executive Committee since 2007; he was appointed the party's Provincial Chairperson in June 2022. He is also a member of the South African Communist Party and as well as a member of ANC's National Executive Committee.

== Early life and activism ==
Andrek Lesufi was born on 4 September 1968 in Edenvale, then part of South Africa's Transvaal Province and now part of Gauteng. His family relocated to Tembisa after they were forcibly removed from Edenvale under the apartheid-era Group Areas Act. He was given the nickname "Panyaza" because of his love of football. He attended Tlamatlama Lower Primary School and Tshepisa Higher Primary School and he matriculated from Boitumelong Senior Secondary School in Tembisa, where he became involved in student politics. He studied at the University of Natal and later obtained a Master's degree in business administration.

While an undergraduate, Lesufi was elected president of the student representative council at the University of Natal's Durban campus. He was a member of various Congress-aligned students' organisations, including the Congress of South African Students (COSAS), the South African Student Congress, and the Tembisa Student Congress. He also managed outreach at the Tembisa Careers Centre and worked in non-governmental and community organisations, such as the Community Policing Forum and National Education Crisis Committee, which were aligned to the United Democratic Front (UDF) and later were part of the Mass Democratic Movement. During the political violence of the 1980s and early 1990s, he was active in UDF-aligned community Self-Defence Units. Lesufi was detained twice for his activism, in 1989 at Modderbee Prison for defying the prevailing state of emergency regulations, and in 1995 at Durban City Prison.

When the African National Congress (ANC) was unbanned by the apartheid government in 1990, he helped rebuild its internal structures in the Transvaal, becoming secretary of his local ANC branch in Tembisa.

== Early government career ==
=== Local and national government ===
After the end of apartheid in 1994, Lesufi held several positions in public administration under the new government formed by the ANC. When the Ekurhuleni Metropolitan Municipality was established in 2000, he was appointed spokesperson to its inaugural mayor, Bavumile Vilakazi. He was later a spokesperson for the National Prosecuting Authority. He served on a task team appointed by the national Minister of Social Development, Zola Skweyiya, to establish the South African Social Security Agency, launched in 2005, and worked for the Minister of Police, Nathi Mthethwa, in connection with the establishment of the Hawks in 2008.

After the 2009 general election, he became an advisor to Gauteng politician Angie Motshekga, who was newly appointed as the inaugural Minister of Basic Education. In July 2009, he was offered, but turned down, the position of Ekurhuleni municipal manager; he said he had declined due to his "other commitments in national government", and sources told the Sowetan that he had declined because of his loyalty to Motshekga. In July 2011, he was appointed head of communications and spokesperson in the Department of Basic Education; the National Press Club named him Media Liaison Officer of the Year 2012. In late March 2014, he was appointed for a month as acting director-general in the department, again working under Minister Motshekga.

=== Gauteng provincial government ===
In the 2014 general election, Lesufi was elected as a Member of the Gauteng Provincial Legislature, ranked tenth on the ANC's party list. He was named Member of the Executive Council (MEC) for Education in the provincial government of Gauteng Premier David Makhura.

He was re-elected to the legislature in the 2019 general election, this time ranked second on the ANC's party list. In May, in a post-election cabinet reshuffle, Makhura appointed Lesufi as MEC for Finance and e-Government. A day after the new MECs were sworn in, however, Makhura reinstated Lesufi as MEC for Education and Youth Development, saying that he was responding to public calls – "from society, the education sector and the movement in general" – to keep Lesufi for a second term in the education portfolio, where he was popular. Basic Education Minister Motshekga had also expressed her view that it would be "a big mistake" to move Lesufi from the education portfolio.

From November 2019 to June 2020, Lesufi served simultaneously as acting MEC for Social Development, until Nomathemba Mokgethi was appointed to replace the late Thuliswa Nkabinde-Khawe.

== Rise in the Gauteng ANC ==
During the same period, Lesufi ascended through the ranks of the ANC in Gauteng. After serving three terms as Tembisa branch secretary, he spent eight years as deputy regional secretary of the ANC's branch in the Kyalami region and then became the inaugural deputy regional secretary of its Ekurhuleni branch. In 2007, he was elected to the Provincial Executive Committee of the ANC in Gauteng. At the ANC's next provincial conference in 2010, Lesufi ran unsuccessfully for the position of Provincial Secretary, coming third in an election in which he won 197 votes against Pule Mlambo's 200 and David Makhura's 485.

=== Deputy Chairperson ===
Eight years later, however, in June 2018, he was elected Deputy Provincial Chairperson of the ANC in Gauteng; the conference also elected Makhura as Provincial Chairperson. Lesufi won the position narrowly, beating another MEC, Lebogang Maile, by only 22 votes, earning 623 votes to Maile's 601. According to the Mail & Guardian, he secured the position by collaborating with Parks Tau, who was reportedly Makhura's favourite deputy; Tau withdrew from the deputy chair race and was instead elected Provincial Treasurer, apparently on the basis of an agreement with Lesufi's supporters.

=== Chairperson ===
Makhura served only one term as ANC Provincial Chairperson and did not stand for re-election in 2022. Lesufi entered the contest to succeed him, again opposing Lebogang Maile. On 27 June 2022, at the provincial conference in Benoni, Lesufi was elected Provincial Chairperson of the Gauteng ANC, receiving 575 votes to Maile's 543. His running mate, finance MEC Nomantu Nkomo-Ralehoko, was elected as his deputy.

As of 2021, Lesufi was also a member of the South African Communist Party (SACP), the ANC's close partner in the Tripartite Alliance.

== Premier of Gauteng ==
On 4 October 2022, Makhura announced his resignation as Premier; some groups within the Gauteng ANC had called for him to resign so that Lesufi could take his position and avoid creating "two centres of power" in the Gauteng ANC. On 6 October, the ANC-controlled Gauteng provincial legislature elected Lesufi to succeed Makhura. He beat Solly Msimanga, the provincial leader of the opposition Democratic Alliance (DA), with 38 votes to Msimanga's 22.

Lesufi was again elected as the premier of Gauteng on 14 June 2024 following a negotiated Government of National Unity. Following his election and Premier, Lesufi announced his cabinet. Appointing a minority cabinet composed of various opposition parities excluding the main opposition party the Democratic Alliance (South Africa), after the two parties failed to reach on an agreement to co-govern Gauteng.

== Controversies ==
=== Language of instruction ===
While Lesufi was MEC for Education, opposition parties accused him of waging a "war on Afrikaans". This stemmed from Lesufi's policy of converting Afrikaans-medium public schools into English-medium or dual-medium schools, and became an issue as early as 2015, when it was leaked that the Gauteng Department of Education was conducting a study of "underutilised" schools in the province with an eye to ameliorating school overcrowding. The study proposed that public schools should be obliged to reconfigure their admissions policies to prioritise access to education over their own language policies and other internal admissions criteria. Lesufi argued that many single-medium schools, especially Afrikaans-medium schools, did not have full classes but would not admit pupils who did not speak Afrikaans, while English-medium schools were overcrowded. He also linked his policy to the principle of non-racialism and the constitutional right to education, claiming that Afrikaans-medium schools used language as a pretext for excluding non-white students and thereby retarded equity and post-apartheid transformation in the public education sector.

Lesufi's policy was opposed by the Federation of Governing Bodies of South African Schools, AfriForum, and Freedom Front Plus, which demanded the right of schools to determine their own language policies and to preserve Afrikaans as a medium of instruction. In January 2018, Hoërskool Overvaal, an Afrikaans high school in Vereeniging, took the Gauteng Department of Education to court after the department placed 55 English-speaking children at the school for the 2018 school year. The school governing body argued that the school was already full and that it could not afford to hire English-speaking teachers for the benefit of a small group of students. The Pretoria High Court ruled in the school's favour, agreeing that it was unreasonable to expect the school to make provision for English instruction on such short notice. The department appealed the ruling in the Constitutional Court, which dismissed it on the grounds that it had no prospect of success.

Also in 2018, the Citizen reported that the Gauteng Department of Education, under Lesufi, had converted 119 Afrikaans- or dual-medium schools to English-medium schools. Afriforum claimed that Lesufi was discriminating against Afrikaans schools, which it said provided a particularly important service to coloured children. The Freedom Front additionally argued that Afrikaans-medium schools were marginal to the issue of access to education, since only 6% of public schools were Afrikaans-speaking; instead, it proposed that the overcrowding problem was caused by Lesufi's "incompetence".

The debate was reignited in 2022 when the national government published the draft Basic Education Laws Amendment Bill, which it intended to introduce in the National Assembly. The bill would reduce the powers of school governing bodies in determining schools' language and admission policies, insofar as those policies would have to be approved by the provincial government, including on criteria related to equity and "effective use" of school resources. Opposition groups, including the DA, opposed the bill as an unjustifiable intrusion of the state into the remit of governing bodies. Afriforum claimed that Lesufi intended to use the legislation to eliminate all Afrikaans-speaking schools and make them multilingual. Lesufi pointed out that the bill proposed a national law, based on the policy of the national government, and did not emanate from his department.

=== COVID-19 ===
In 2021, Lesufi endorsed a traditional Chinese remedy, Lianhua Qingwen capsules, as a treatment for COVID-19; the remedy had been described by the American Food and Drug Administration as "fraudulent". Lesufi's spokesperson denied that his remarks about the pills, which circulated in a video on WhatsApp, had been intended as a public or commercial endorsement.

Also during the COVID-19 pandemic, the Gauteng Department of Education under Lesufi's stewardship allegedly spent more than R431-million on sanitising or "decontaminating" public schools between June and August 2020. This claim was first reported in 2021 by the Daily Maverick, which also claimed that the deep cleaning programme was not required by government guidelines and had partly been carried out by companies which appeared to have little experience in cleaning. Lesufi said that he had not been aware of the deep cleaning programme and would seek to hold accountable the department employees who had been responsible for signing the relevant contracts.

Political offices
Preceded by David Makhura	Premier of Gauteng; 2022 – Present	Incumbent
