= Government of Gauteng =

Government of Gauteng province in South Africa

Government of Gauteng Gautengse Regering (Afrikaans)
- Polity type: Province
- Part of: South Africa
- Constitution: Chapter Six of the Constitution of South Africa

Legislative branch
- Name: Gauteng Provincial Legislature
- Type: Unicameral
- Meeting place: Johannesburg City Hall
- Presiding officer: Ntombi Lentheng Mekgwe, Speaker

Executive branch
- Head of government
- Title: Premier
- Currently: Panyaza Lesufi
- Appointer: Gauteng Provincial Legislature

The government of Gauteng province in South Africa consists of a unicameral legislature elected by proportional representation, and an executive branch headed by a Premier who is elected by the legislature.

== Legislature ==
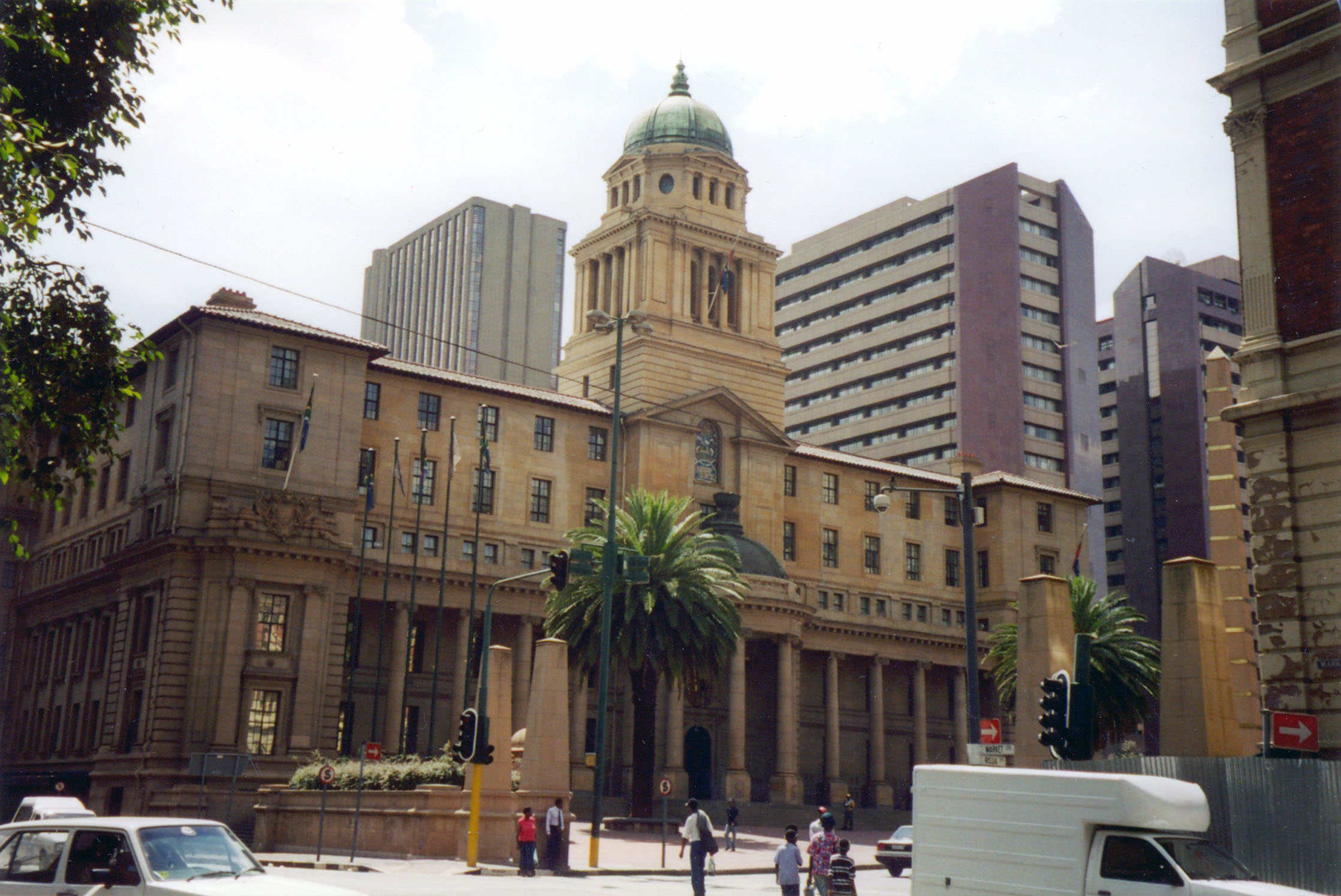
Johannesburg City Hall, seat of the provincial legislature

The provincial legislature is a unicameral body of 73 members elected by a system of party-list proportional representation. The legislature is elected for a term of five years, unless it is dissolved early. By convention elections to the provincial legislature are held at the same time as elections to the National Assembly. The legislature meets in the Johannesburg City Hall.

The most recent elections were held on 8 May 2019, and were won by the African National Congress (ANC) which obtained 37 of the 73 seats on the legislature. The composition of the legislature is as follows:

Party	Seats
ANC	37
DA	20
EFF	11
VF+	3
IFP	1
ACDP	1
Total	73

== Executive ==
The head of the provincial executive is the Premier of Gauteng, who is a member of the provincial legislature elected by the legislature. The Premier appoints an Executive Council who are a cabinet overseeing the executive departments.

As of December 2022 the Premier is Panyaza Lesufi of the ANC, and the ten members of the Executive Council are listed in the following table.

Portfolio	MEC
Premier	Panyaza Lesufi
e-Government	Bonginkosi Dhlamini
Finance and Economic Development	Lebogang Maile
Education and Sports, Arts, Culture and Recreation	Matome Chiloane
Health and Wellness	Nomantu Nkomo-Ralehoko
Roads and Transport	Kedibone Diale-Tlabela
Human Settlements	Tasneem Motara
Social Development	Faith Mazibuko
Agriculture and Rural Development	Vuyiswa Ramokgopa
Infrastructure Development and Cooperative Governance and Traditional Affairs	Jacob Mamabolo
Environment	Sheila Mary Peters

== Courts ==
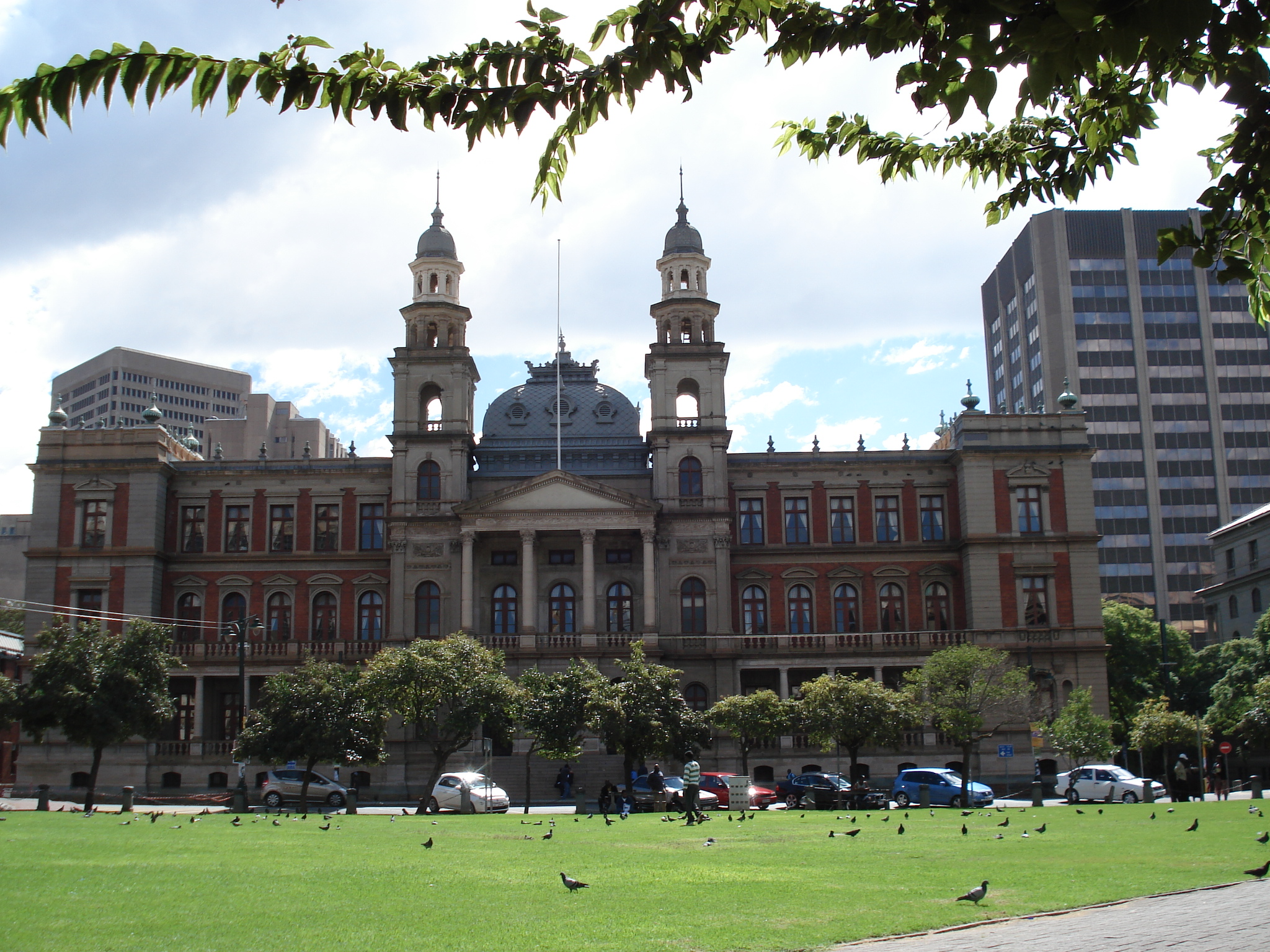
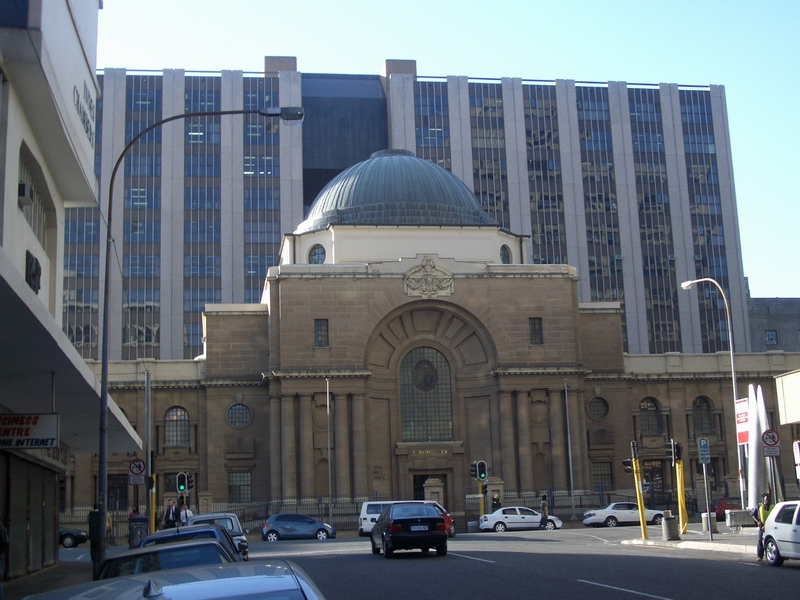
The seats of the Gauteng Division of the High Court in Pretoria (above) and Johannesburg (below)

South Africa has a single national court system and the provinces do not have their own courts. The Gauteng Division of the High Court of South Africa, which has seats in Pretoria and Johannesburg, has jurisdiction over all cases arising in the province. However, most cases are first heard in one of the over 25 district magistrates' courts or in the regional magistrate's court for the province. Appeals from the magistrates' courts are to the High Court, and appeals from the High Court are to the Supreme Court of Appeal or the Constitutional Court.

== Administrative divisions ==
Map of municipalities in Gauteng

Gauteng is divided into three metropolitan municipalities and two district municipalities. The district municipalities are in turn divided into a total of seven local municipalities. These municipalities are:

- City of Johannesburg Metropolitan Municipality
- City of Tshwane Metropolitan Municipality
- Ekurhuleni Metropolitan Municipality
- Sedibeng District Municipality, consisting of Emfuleni Local Municipality, Lesedi Local Municipality and Midvaal Local Municipality
- West Rand District Municipality, consisting of Merafong City Local Municipality, Mogale City Local Municipality, and Rand West City Local Municipality.

== See also ==
- Government of South Africa
- Provincial governments of South Africa
- Politics of Gauteng
