= Qedani Mahlangu =

South African politician

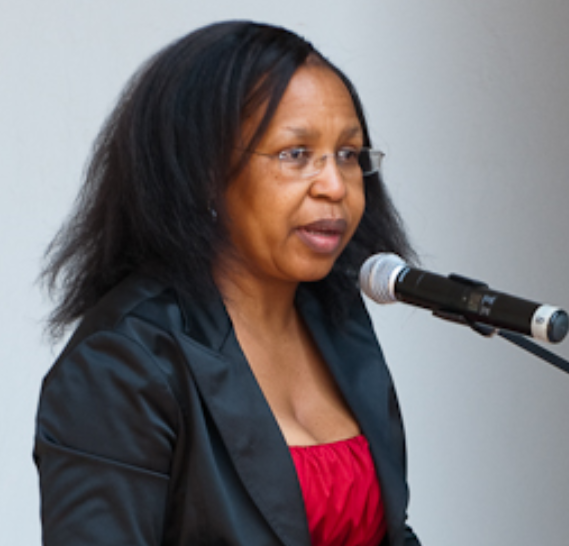
- Mahlangu in 2011

Member of the Gauteng Executive Council for Health
- In office 23 May 2014 – 1 February 2017
- Premier: David Makhura
- Preceded by: Hope Papo
- Succeeded by: Gwen Ramokgopa
- In office May 2009 – November 2010 (for Health and Social Development)
- Premier: Nomvula Mokonyane
- Preceded by: Brian Hlongwa (for Health)
- Succeeded by: Ntombi Mekgwe

Personal details
- Born: 12 May 1968 (age 58) Bethal, Mpumalanga; South Africa
- Party: African National Congress
- Children: Nkululeko Chris Skosana
- Education: University of the Western Cape; Williams College

Qedani Dorothy Mahlangu (born 12 May 1968) is a South African politician who served continuously in the Gauteng Executive Council from 2004 to 2017. She is best known for her tenure as Gauteng's Member of the Executive Council (MEC) for Health from 2014 to 2017, when she presided over the Life Esidimeni scandal. In February 2017, she resigned from the Executive Council and from the Gauteng Provincial Legislature after the Health Ombud, Malegapuru Makgoba, released a report which implicated her in the scandal.

Before her appointment as Health MEC, Mahlangu served as MEC for Infrastructure Development from 2012 to 2014, MEC for Economic Development from 2010 to 2012, MEC for Health and Social Development from 2009 to 2010, and MEC for Local Government from 2004 to 2009. She is a member of the African National Congress and served multiple terms on the party's Provincial Executive Committee in Gauteng.

== Early life and career ==
=== Early years and education ===
Qedani Mahlangu was born on 12 May 1968 in Bethal, a farming town in Mpumalanga, South Africa. After completing secondary schooling, she qualified as a Teacher and went on to study for an Advanced Diploma in Economics with the University of the Western Cape. Furthermore, she attended a post-graduate diploma course with the London School of Economics and an economics program at Williams College in Massachusetts, USA. She was awarded an Honours Degree in Economics from University of the Western Cape.

=== Political career ===
Mahlangu joined the South African Youth Congress in the late 1980s, and subsequently joined the ANC Youth League in the early 1990s. She progressed through the ranks of the ANC Youth League in various capacities, from branch to national level. Her membership evolved from ANC Youth League to African National Congress full membership in time, and she became a member of parliament in 1998, serving as Gauteng Whip in the National Council of Provinces. After the 1999 elections, she was appointed Chairperson of the Select Committee on Finance in the National Council of Provinces, a position she held until 2004.

She has participated in ANC structures in various capacities, including serving as member of the ANC's Provincial Executive Committee in Gauteng since 2002. From 2003 until April 2004 she was deployed as part of the election machinery of the ANC in Gauteng and nationally.

Mahlangu is listed as Constituency Contact for the Kliptown and Midvaal ANC Constituency Offices in the Gauteng Provincial Legislature.

== Gauteng Provincial Government ==
=== Local Government MEC: 2004–2009 ===
On 29 April 2004, following the 2004 general election, Premier Mbhazima Shilowa appointed Mahlangu to the Gauteng Executive Council as Member of the Executive Council (MEC) for Local Government. She held that position until 2009 under Shilowa and his successor, Paul Mashatile. While in the portfolio, she initiated "Operation Consolidate", a large programme of financial support to municipalities which aimed to improve financial management systems at the municipal level. She also called for municipalities to cut services to any provincial or national government departments which defaulted on their rates and services.

In 2008, the Mail & Guardian reported that Mahlangu had pushed through a land deal which a forensic investigation found had been "irregular". Jules Browde, then the Integrity Commissioner in the Gauteng Provincial Legislature, investigated at the request of the opposition Democratic Alliance; he found that the deal had been "perfectly legitimate".

=== Health and Social Development MEC: 2009–2010 ===
Mahlangu was re-elected to her legislative seat in the 2009 general election and newly elected Premier Nomvula Mokonyane moved her to a new portfolio as MEC for Health and Social Development.

In June 2007 the Department of Health, Gauteng concluded a service level agreement with Baoki Consortium and 3P Consultants in terms of which 3P Consulting was obliged to establish a Project Management Unit for the department to set-up a Health Information System and Electronic Health Records for Gauteng hospitals and clinics. On 23 March 2009 the agreement was extended for a further three years by the then MEC of Health Brian Hlongwa. Mahlangu Replaced Hlongwa as MEC of Health on 8 May 2009 after the National Elections, as part of Nomvula Mokonyane's first provincial cabinet. Shortly after Mahlangu conducted a review of projects and on 1 July 2009 she wrote a letter to 3P Consulting stating that the department was cancelling the extended agreement. According to Ms Mahlangu's affidavit this was ‘due to serious allegations of impropriety as well as irregularities in the award as well as the extension of the agreement’. There was extensive litigation between the parties and on 18 February 2010 the South Gauteng High Court (Lamont J) granted a declaration that the services agreement between 3P Consulting and the department was validly concluded and extended. The department appealed the decision of the high court and failed, furthermore on 7 February 2011 the Constitutional Court refused leave for a further appeal. On 13 October 2011, 3P Consulting instituted application proceedings against the department claiming payment of some R99 million excluding interest and costs. The proceedings were defended by the department and referred for trial. Before the trial 3P Consulting was placed in liquidation. Its claim against the department was its sole substantial asset. The liquidators applied for the appointment of a commissioner to investigate the company's affairs and to determine whether it should continue with the litigation against the department to recover the claim. In July 2014, The National Prosecuting Authority applied to the South Gauteng High Court to place preservation orders on any claims that 3P Consulting and Baoki may have filed against the Department of Health Gauteng, effectively attaching such claims as proceeds of unlawful activities, following attaching of Hlongwa's luxury home.

On 19 May 2010, Six premature babies (Initially reported as five) died of diarrhea at the Charlotte Maxeke Academic hospital in Johannesburg. Mahlangu acknowledged she should take some responsibility in the deaths, but refused to admit to any negligence on the part of the hospital or its staff. Professor Keith Bolton, who was also the head of paediatrics at Rahima Moosa Hospital, helped compile the report which concluded that this had been an unusual case. The families did not receive any compensation from the department.

In September 2010, Mahlangu oversaw the process of closing 3 TB Hospitals in Gauteng Province, namely Charles Hurwitz TB Hospital in Soweto, Tshepong TB Hospital in Tshwane, and East Rand TB Hospital in Ekurhuleni. Mahlangu defended the closure of the Three Gauteng tuberculosis hospitals as necessary to save money and channel resources to where they are needed most, with approximately R3 Million forecast as savings per year.

=== Economic Development MEC: 2010–2012 ===
After less than two years in the health portfolio, on 2 November 2010, Mahlangu was appointed MEC for Economic Development in a major cabinet reshuffle by Premier Mokonyane.

In 2012 she led the establishment of Township Enterprise Hubs in Sebokeng; Sharpville; Kagiso; Katlehong; Winterveld, and Tembisa. Each hubs were to provide Automotive cluster; Services cluster and Light manufacturing cluster. These hubs were later adopted with provincial government spending at least 5% of its R10-billion procurement budget for goods and services on township enterprises, by the end of 2015.

Between 2011 and 2013, Mahlangu worked to introduce a Gauteng Liquor Regulations on Shebeen Licences, into the Gauteng Liquor Act, 2003. Under this regulatory framework, Sheeben permits would be replaced by Sheeben licenses issued and regulated by the Gauteng Liquor Board. The regulations were meant to discourage the trading of alcohol on Sundays and religious holidays, as well as prohibiting any shebeen or tavern from operating within 500 metres of a school or place of worship. The regulation received wide public acceptance, although some stakeholders resisted the regulation citing difficulty in enforcement. Some of the provisions of the regulation were later relaxed, including allowing for trade of liquor on Sunday.

Mahlangu fired the board and its chair, Prince Mafojane, in 2012 when they questioned her decision to relocate from Bramley in the north of Johannesburg to the new Department of Economic Development building in Johannesburg City Centre. The members of the board took the matter to the Supreme Court of Appeals South Africa and won the case on 27 May 2013. The court ruled that "she acted with an ulterior purpose, to pressurize the Board into accommodating, in a building owned by it, a commercial entity named by her", furthermore it ruled that the decision to terminate the membership of all the members of the Board set aside, and the court expressed displeasure at the high-handed manner in which MEC behaved".

=== Infrastructure Development MEC: 2012–2014 ===
In another reshuffle, announced by Mokonyane on 16 July 2012, Mahlangu was moved from the Economic Development portfolio to the Infrastructure Development portfolio.

In 2014, Premier Mokonyane, finance MEC Mandla Nkomfe and infrastructure MEC Qedani Mahlangu, were cleared by the Gauteng legislature's privileges and ethics standing committee after the integrity commission investigated allegations of fraudulent expenditure against them. Mahlangu was ordered to pay back the R7309 she used to buy leather goods with her government-issue credit card in Istanbul, Turkey, during a visit in 2013.

=== Health MEC: 2014–2017 ===
Mahlangu was re-elected to the provincial legislature in the 2014 general election, ranked ninth on the ANC's party list. On 23 May, she was returned to her old portfolio as MEC for Health (now separated from the Social Development portfolio) under Mokonyane's successor, newly elected Premier David Makhura.

From January 2010 to the end of the 2014/15 financial year, the provincial department of health paid out about R544 million in damages and settlements relating to medical negligence cases. Mahlangu was instructed by Premier Makhura to look at a different mechanism of addressing medical negligence cases besides the court processes where the department had lost approximately 168 cases in the same period. Some of the medical negligence cases include, Security guards turning away patients from the clinics, leading to at least two deaths in 2015, and severe brain damage with cerebral palsy, suffered by a baby boy where hospital staff allegedly failing to properly monitor him after birth in 2007.

==== Life Esidimeni scandal ====
In 2015, Mahlangu announced her department's decision to terminate its contract with private hospital group Life Healthcare and its Life Esidimeni psychiatric facilities to save money, as the department was paying R320 per day per patient to Life Esidimeni. The bulk of state-subsidised patients would be moved to the care of cheaper community-based organisations. Mahlangu encountered huge public opposition, but went ahead with her decision. Experts, families and activists warned that the organisations could not provide the high-level care most Life Esidimeni patients needed. On 13 September 2016, in what later became known as the Life Healthcare Esidimeni Scandal, Mahlangu disclosed during an oral reply to questions from Jack Bloom, that 36 psychiatric patients that were transferred from Life Healthcare Esidimeni earlier in 2016 had died while in the care of the NGOs. This prompted the Health Minister Aaron Motsoaledi to request the health ombudsman Professor Malegapuru W Makgoba to investigate the deaths two days after the disclosure by Mahlangu. A report requested by the Minister of Health was finally released on 1 February 2017, after it was delayed by Mahlangu who wanted time to peruse the document, as well as an extension of time to provide feedback. The report concluded that many more than 36 patients had died and recommended that Mahlangu's suitability as MEC be reconsidered.

==== Aftermath ====
On the evening of 1 February 2017, shortly after the release of the Health Ombud's report, Mahlangu resigned from the Executive Council. Premier Makhura said that she would be succeeded as MEC by Gwen Ramokgopa, the incumbent national Deputy Minister of Health, and that Gauteng Social Development MEC Nandi Mayathula-Khoza would oversee her portfolio in an acting capacity until then. Mahlangu also resigned her seat in the Gauteng Provincial Legislature, although she remained a member of the Provincial Executive Committee of the ANC in Gauteng. Her re-election to the Provincial Executive Committee in July 2018 caused public outcry, until in December 2018 the ANC National Executive Committee asked her to resign from the body.

The Life Esidimeni deaths were investigated by an inquest and by arbitrator Dikgang Moseneke. Mahlangu was not available to testify at the arbitration hearings, apparently because she was writing exams at the London School of Economics, although the university told the Bhekisisa Centre for Health Journalism that no exams were taking place. She ultimately appeared to testify in 2018 and disputed the Health Ombud's implication that she had been negligent, arguing that she had been the political head of the Gauteng Department of Health and that it would have been inappropriate for her to intervene in the department's operational activities.

== Personal life ==
Qedani Mahlangu is unmarried and has one child, Nkululeko Chris Skhosana who was born in 1996.

Political offices
Preceded by Hope Papo	Gauteng MEC for Health and Social Development; 23 May 2014 – 1 February 2017	Succeeded by Gwen Ramokgopa
Preceded by Bheki Nkosi	Gauteng MEC for Infrastructure Development; 16 July 2012 – 23 May 2014	Succeeded by Nandi Mayathula-Khoza
Preceded by Firoz Cachalia	Gauteng MEC for Economic Development; 2 November 2010 – 16 July 2012	Succeeded by Nkosiphendule Kolisile
Preceded by Brian Hlongwa	Gauteng MEC for Health; 8 May 2009 – 2 November 2010	Succeeded by Ntombi Mekgwe
Preceded by Trevor Fowler	Gauteng MEC of local government (later Merged to Local government and housing); 2004 – 8 May 2009	Succeeded by Kgaogelo Lekgoro
