= Bruce D. Walker =

American physician (1952)

- Born: April 18, 1952 (age 74)
- Education: University of Colorado, Boulder; Case Western Reserve University; Mass General Hospital; Harvard Medical School
- Occupations: Physician, scientist
- Known for: HIV/AIDS research
- Website: ragoninstitute.org/walker/

Bruce D. Walker (born April 18, 1952) is an American physician and scientist whose infectious disease research has produced many findings regarding HIV/AIDS. He became interested in studying HIV/AIDS after practicing on the front lines of the epidemic in the early 1980s, prior to the identification of HIV as the etiologic agent and prior to the availability of viable treatment options.

An infectious disease specialist and researcher, Walker is the founding director of the Ragon Institute of Mass General, MIT, and Harvard. He is also an investigator at Howard Hughes Medical Institute, an adjunct professor at Nelson R. Mandela School of Medicine at the University of KwaZulu-Natal, and a founding co-director of the Africa Health Research Institute, formerly known as KwaZulu-Natal Research Institute for Tuberculosis and HIV (K-RITH).

He played an active role in COVID-19 research, helping found and co-lead the Massachusetts Consortium on Pathogen Readiness (MassCPR) and advance vaccine development with the Ragon Institute.

Walker was named a Fellow of the American Association for the Advancement of Science and the American Academy of Microbiology. He was elected to the National Academy of Medicine in 2009.

== Early life and education ==
After graduating from high school, Walker worked as a roofer. He had grown up assuming he would eventually become a scientist and subsequently obtained a bachelor's of science degree in chemistry from the University of Colorado, Boulder. He went on to receive a medical degree from Case Western Reserve University, where he was drawn to clinical medicine. He completed his internship and residency in internal medicine at Mass General Hospital and Harvard Medical School from 1980 to 1983, followed by an internship pathology and fellowship training in infectious disease. He is board certified in internal medicine and infectious disease. In 1980, as an intern at Mass General Hospital working on the front lines of the still-unidentified HIV/AIDS epidemic, Walker encountered a young man who was admitted to the hospital with multiple simultaneous infections and cancers. This proved to be a sentinel case of a new disease called AIDS, the cause of which was unknown and for which no specific treatment was available.

By the time HIV was identified as the cause of AIDS, Walker and his colleagues had seen many patients with advanced HIV/AIDS, for which few treatment options existed. He has described these experiences as "excruciating" and "heartbreaking." They led Walker to specialize in infectious disease and begin researching HIV in the laboratory, to understand how the body fought back and why it often lost the battle.

== Career ==
Walker has made significant contributions to the research of HIV immune control and immune evasion in HIV infection.

=== Research into T cell responses and "elite controllers" ===
In 1987, Walker became among the first researchers, together with his mentors Robert Schooley and Martin Hirsch, to describe HIV-specific CD8+ T cells. Studying persons with HIV infection with grant support from the American Cancer Society, Walker identified extremely robust responses in persons with advanced disease, using recombinant vaccinia viruses to express HIV proteins.

Before effective antiretroviral therapy was available, Walker met a patient with hemophilia who had been infected with HIV through a blood product in 1978 but never developed AIDS. At first, Walker did not believe the patient had HIV because he had remained healthy despite being infected for 17 years, as confirmed by the patient's years of stored blood samples. This experience initiated a career of learning from patients, inspiring subsequent research into "elite controllers," the less than 1 percent of people living with HIV who remain healthy, without medication, decades after infection. Studying these individuals has been a major focus of Walker's research efforts, leading to the discovery of HIV-specific CD4+ T cells.

In South Africa, Walker has worked with Drs. Krista Dong, Thumbi Ndung'u, and collaborators to focus on hyperacute HIV infection. They perform their work through a cohort called FRESH, meaning, "Females Rising through Education, Support, and Health." FRESH is a program that combines HIV prevention, a pathway out of poverty for young women at high risk, and a study of hyperacute HIV infection. One goal of the program is to ward off HIV infections through a prevention curriculum that includes life skills training, empowerment skills, computer education, HIV prevention education, PrEP (pre-exposure prophylaxis), and job readiness training. Organizers aspire to help participants find employment after nine months in the program. The second goal is to identify persons in the window period before peak viremia and seroconversion (defined by Fiebig Stages I-VI), to determine how the battle between host and virus begins. Through this study, Walker and colleagues have determined that the higher initial magnitude of the HIV-specific T cell response, the lower the viral set point in untreated infection. They also found that immediate treatment leads to more functional immune responses.

=== Doris Duke Medical Research Institute (DDMRI) and the Africa Health Research Institute ===
In 1998, Walker began research in KwaZulu-Natal (KZN) province, South Africa. The initial plan had been to find collaborators in South Africa, hardest hit by the AIDS epidemic, to study immune responses in babies born with HIV infection, who typically have very rapid disease progression. The stated goal was to bring samples back to the US, but the African collaborators, led by the late Jerry Coovadia, asked Walker and colleagues to consider doing the studies in Durban and teach them to conduct fundamental research. This prompted the establishment of a small laboratory at the University of KwaZulu Natal (UKZN) in Durban. Recognizing the wealth of knowledge that could be gained by conducting research at the heart of the TB and HIV epidemics, as well as the need for capacity building for fundamental and translational research, Walker, Coovadia, Salim Abdool Karim, and Philip Goulder initiated a plan to build a research laboratory at the University, which had not had a new building built in over 50 years. In 2003, the Doris Duke Medical Research Institute (DDMRI) opened at the Nelson R. Mandela School of Medicine. The institute was largely funded through a Doris Duke Charitable Foundation Walker had received at MGH. UKZN took ownership of the new facility.

In 2012, the research facilities there were expanded to include the KwaZulu-Natal Research Institute for TB and HIV (K-RITH), funded by Walker's employer the Howard Hughes Medical Institute and for which Walker served as a founding co-director. K-RITH has subsequently been renamed the Africa Health Research Institute.

=== Ragon Institute of Mass General, MIT, and Harvard ===
The Ragon Institute of Mass General, MIT, and Harvard was officially established in 2009, with the support of Phillip Ragon and his wife, Susan M. Ragon. Walker met Phillip Ragon at the request of a salesman for an electronic medical record (EMR) being used at a mission hospital where Walker and collaborators were working to treat persons living with HIV. Ragon's company, InterSystems, had just acquired the EMR, and the salesman wanted Walker to convey how important the EMR was for treatment of persons living with HIV. This led to a brief conversation between Walker and Ragon, followed by a short trip to KZN to see the EMR in action and to get a view of the ongoing HIV epidemic. After three days, Ragon asked how he could help. In the end, he and Susan Ragon donated $100 million in 2009 to establish the Ragon Institute, whose vision is to harness the immune system to prevent and cure human disease. The foundations of the Institute began with HIV research in South Africa, and HIV remains one of the institute's primary areas of focus. During the organization's first two years, Walker brought on 40 new scientists to research HIV. Walker works as a principal investigator at the Ragon Institute and focuses with his team on the body's immune response to viral infection, including through studies of patients with chronic HIV infection and those who can control HIV infection to undetectable levels without the need for antiretroviral therapy (ART).

=== Research work and career highlights ===
- Professor of Medicine, Harvard Medical School.
- Professor of the Practice, Institute for Medical Engineering and Science and Department of Biology, MIT.
- Adjunct Professor of Medicine, Nelson Mandela School of Medicine, University of KwaZulu-Natal.
- Investigator, Howard Hughes Medical Institute.
- Faculty Co-leader, Massachusetts Consortium on Pathogen Readiness (MassCPR), a group of collaborators aiming to address the challenges faced during COVID-19 and to enhance precautions for future pandemics.
- Scientific collaboration in South Africa, leading to the establishment of the Doris Duke Medical Research Institute and the Africa Health Research Institute.
- Established the FRESH program, merging the study of the immune system's response to HIV with a social program.
- Established the MIT course "Evolution of an Epidemic," bringing undergraduate students to South Africa.
- First to describe HIV-specific CD8+ T cells and HIV-specific CD4+ T-cell responses.
- Defined the role of T cells in acute and chronic HIV infection and transmission.
- Discovered the role of immune checkpoints in dysfunctional cellular immune responses to HIV.
- Characterized both hosts and viral genetic factors involved in modulating viral control.
- Played an active role in COVID-19 research and vaccine development with the Ragon Institute.
- Holds an honorary doctorate of science degree from Case Western Reserve University for his accomplishments in HIV/AIDS research and work with the Ragon Institute.

== Awards and recognition ==
The following are awards and honors bestowed upon Walker:

- Ranked No. 18 on Research.com's list of the world's top immunologists.
- Recipient of two NIH Merit Awards, in 1994 and 2011.
- Recipient of Doris Duke Charitable Foundation Distinguished Clinical Scientist Award.
- Elected member of the National Academy of Medicine and the American Academy of Arts and Sciences.
- Recipient of the Barcelona AIDS Award (Fight Against AIDS Foundation) and Heroes in Action Award (AIDS Action Committee).
- Recipient Bernard Fields Lectureship in 2015.

== Key publications ==
- Augmentation of HIV-specific T cell function by immediate treatment of hyperacute HIV-1 infection. Ndhlovu, ZM, Kazer, SW, Nkosi, T, Ogunshola, F, Muema, DM, Anmole, G, Swann, SA, Moodley, A, Dong, K, Reddy, T et al.. 2019. Sci Transl Med 11, .doi: 10.1126/scitranslmed.aau0528
- Structural topology defines protective CD8+ T cell epitopes in the HIV proteome. Gaiha, GD, Rossin, EJ, Urbach, J, Landeros, C, Collins, DR, Nwonu, C, Muzhingi, I, Anahtar, MN, Waring, OM, Piechocka-Trocha, A et al.. 2019. Science 364, 480-484. doi: 10.1126/science.aav5095
- Resistance of HIV-infected macrophages to CD8+ T lymphocyte-mediated killing drives activation of the immune system. Clayton, KL, Collins, DR, Lengieza, J, Ghebremichael, M, Dotiwala, F, Lieberman, J, Walker, BD. 2018. Nat Immunol 19, 475-486. doi: 10.1038/s41590-018-0085-3
- A genome-wide CRISPR screen identifies a restricted set of HIV host dependency factors. Park, RJ, Wang, T, Koundakjian, D, Hultquist, JF, Lamothe-Molina, P, Monel, B, Schumann, K, Yu, H, Krupzcak, KM, Garcia-Beltran, W et al.. 2017. Nat Genet 49, 193-203. doi: 10.1038/ng.3741
- Antiviral CD8+ T Cells Restricted by Human Leukocyte Antigen Class II Exist during Natural HIV Infection and Exhibit Clonal Expansion. Ranasinghe, S, Lamothe, PA, Soghoian, DZ, Kazer, SW, Cole, MB, Shalek, AK, Yosef, N, Jones, RB, Donaghey, F, Nwonu, C et al.. 2016. Immunity 45, 917-930. doi: 10.1016/j.immuni.2016.09.015
- Magnitude and Kinetics of CD8+ T Cell Activation during Hyperacute HIV Infection Impact Viral Set Point. Ndhlovu, ZM, Kamya, P, Mewalal, N, Kløverpris, HN, Nkosi, T, Pretorius, K, Laher, F, Ogunshola, F, Chopera, D, Shekhar, K et al.. 2015. Immunity 43, 591-604. doi: 10.1016/j.immuni.2015.08.012
- TCR clonotypes modulate the protective effect of HLA class I molecules in HIV-1 infection. Chen, H, Ndhlovu, ZM, Liu, D, Porter, LC, Fang, JW, Darko, S, Brockman, MA, Miura, T, Brumme, ZL, Schneidewind, A et al.. 2012. Nat Immunol 13, 691-700. doi: 10.1038/ni.2342
- The major genetic determinants of HIV-1 control affect HLA class I peptide presentation. International HIV Controllers Study, Pereyra, F, Jia, X, McLaren, PJ, Telenti, A, de Bakker, PI, Walker, BD, Ripke, S, Brumme, CJ, Pulit, SL et al.. 2010. Science 330, 1551-7. doi: 10.1126/science.1195271
- CD8+ T-cell responses to different HIV proteins have discordant associations with viral load. Kiepiela, P, Ngumbela, K, Thobakgale, C, Ramduth, D, Honeyborne, I, Moodley, E, Reddy, S, de Pierres, C, Mncube, Z, Mkhwanazi, N et al.. 2007. Nat Med 13, 46-53. doi: 10.1038/nm1520
- PD-1 expression on HIV-specific T cells is associated with T-cell exhaustion and disease progression. Day, CL, Kaufmann, DE, Kiepiela, P, Brown, JA, Moodley, ES, Reddy, S, Mackey, EW, Miller, JD, Leslie, AJ, DePierres, C et al.. 2006. Nature 443, 350-4. doi: 10.1038/nature05115
