= Shuttle phasmid =

Chimeric DNA vector

Shuttle phasmids, sometimes called phagemids, are chimeric DNA vectors that replicate as plasmids in Escherichia coli as mycobacteriophages and in mycobacteria.

== Application ==
Shuttle phasmids, sometimes called phagemids, allow the insertion of foreign genetic material into the mycobacterial genome through homologous recombination (HR) or transposons.

Transformation efficiencies achieved through shuttle phasmids far exceed those resulting from electroporation.

== History ==
In 1987, William Jacobs Jr. et al. utilized a shuttle phasmid for the first successful introduction of foreign DNA into mycobacteria. The employed shuttle phasmid—a term they coined—consisted of an E. coli bacteriophage lambda cosmid inserted into a non-essential region of mycobacteriophage TM4.

Bardarov et al first created temperature-sensitive shuttle phasmids that replicate and form plaques at 30°C but are unable to do so at 37°C.

Bardarov et al also adapted shuttle phasmids to insert or knock out genes via homologous recombination, a process termed specialized transduction.

Shuttle phasmids enabled the isolation of mc²155, the fist plasmid-transformable Mycobacterium smegmatis strain.
