= Gwen Ramokgopa =

South African politician

- Ramokgopa in 2008

Treasurer-General of the African National Congress
- Incumbent
- Assumed office 19 December 2022
- President: Cyril Ramaphosa
- Preceded by: Paul Mashatile

Chancellor of the Tshwane University of Technology
- Incumbent
- Assumed office 10 June 2015
- Preceded by: Phumzile Mlambo-Ngcuka

Gauteng MEC for Health
- In office February 2017 – May 2019
- Premier: David Makhura
- Preceded by: Qedani Mahlangu
- Succeeded by: Bandile Masuku
- In office 1999–2006
- Premier: Mbhazima Shilowa
- Preceded by: Mondli Gungubele
- Succeeded by: Brian Hlongwa

Deputy Minister of Health
- In office 31 October 2010 – May 2014
- President: Jacob Zuma
- Minister: Aaron Motsoaledi
- Succeeded by: Joe Phaahla

Deputy Provincial Chairperson of the Gauteng African National Congress
- In office May 2010 – October 2014
- Chairperson: Paul Mashatile
- Preceded by: Nomvula Mokonyane
- Succeeded by: David Makhura

Mayor of Tshwane
- In office 17 March 2006 – 31 October 2010
- Preceded by: Smangaliso Mkhatshwa
- Succeeded by: Kgosientso Ramokgopa

Executive Chairperson and leader of the ANC City Council of Pretoria

Personal details
- Born: Gwen Malegwale Ramokgopa Atteridgeville, Transvaal, South Africa
- Party: African National Congress
- Spouse: Allen Lephoko
- Children: 3
- Education: Medical University of South Africa (MBChB)

Gwen Malegwale Ramokgopa (born 1962, Atteridgeville) is a South African politician who was elected the Treasurer-General of the governing African National Congress (ANC) in December 2022. She was formerly the Deputy Minister of Health under President Jacob Zuma from October 2010 to May 2014.

A medical doctor by training, Ramokgopa began her political career in the provincial government of Gauteng. She was the Member of the Executive Council (MEC) for Health in Gauteng from 1999 to 2006 and again from 2017 to 2019. She was also the first female Mayor of Tshwane from 2006 until 2010, when she was elevated to national office. At the same time, she was a member of the ANC Provincial Executive Committee in Gauteng, serving as ANC Deputy Provincial Chairperson to Paul Mashatile (2010 to 2014) and then as ANC Deputy Provincial Secretary to Hope Papo (2014 to 2018). She was elected to the party's National Executive Committee for the first time in 2017.

== Early career and education ==
Ramokgopa was born and raised in Atteridgeville, a township outside Pretoria in what is now Gauteng province (then the Transvaal). She qualified as a medical doctor in 1989 at the Medical University of South Africa and worked as a medical officer at Ga-Rankuwa Hospital until 1992. In subsequent years she held several positions in public health, and later, in 2007, she received a Master's degree in public health.

== Career in government ==
=== Health MEC: 1998–2006 ===
In 1999, she was appointed Member of the Executive Council (MEC) for Health in the Gauteng provincial government of Gauteng Premier Mbhazima Shilowa, with whom she was reported to be close. In 2003, she caused mild controversy by insisting that the Ga-Rankuwa Hospital (where she previously worked) should be renamed after a local doctor and activist named George Mukhari; the opposition Democratic Alliance claimed that Ramokgopa had not consulted the community about the decision and that she was motivated by her personal friendship with the Mukhari family. She vacated the MEC position in 2006.

=== Tshwane Mayor: 2006–2010 ===
In March 2006, pursuant to the 2006 local elections, Ramokgopa was elected the first female Mayor of Tshwane, leading the City of Tshwane Metropolitan Municipality. While mayor she pursued a stubborn campaign to rebrand Pretoria – the administrative capital of South Africa and part of the Tshwane municipality – as Tshwane. The Daily Maverick said she was "a disaster" as Mayor. She left the job in November 2010 and was replaced by her nephew, Kgosientso "Sputla" Ramokgopa.

=== Deputy Minister of Health: 2010–2014 ===
Ramokgopa left the mayoral office because President Jacob Zuma, in a cabinet reshuffle on 31 October, had appointed her national Deputy Minister of Health under Minister Aaron Motsoaledi. In May 2014, after the 2014 general election, she was replaced as Deputy Minister by Joe Phaahla.

The following year, during the #FeesMustFall student protests, she was appointed the Chancellor of the Tshwane University of Technology, a primarily ceremonial position; she remained Chancellor as of November 2021.

=== Health MEC: 2017–2019 ===
In February 2017, Ramokgopa was returned to her earlier position as Gauteng MEC for Health, this time by Premier David Makhura. She succeeded Qedani Mahlangu, who had resigned shortly after the Life Esidimeni scandal broke. Upon taking office, Ramokgopa promised of the tragedy that her department would "reflect on this experience, as difficult as it is, and find ways to restore the confidence of our people in our health system". In the May 2019 general election she was not re-elected to a seat in the Gauteng provincial legislature and she vacated her seat on the Executive Council.

== Career in the ANC ==
=== Provincial Executive Committee: 2010–2018 ===
In May 2010, while still Tshwane Mayor, Ramokgopa was elected Deputy Provincial Chairperson of the ANC in Gauteng, deputising Paul Mashatile. She beat Bafana Sibisi to be elected to the position, receiving 513 votes against Sibisi's 364, and was viewed as having run on an informal slate aligned to Mashatile. At the party's next provincial elective conference in October 2014, she was elected ANC Deputy Provincial Secretary, serving under Hope Papo, and completed a four-year term in that office before she was succeeded by Nomantu Nkomo-Ralehoko in 2018.

=== Secretary-General's office: 2022 ===
At the ANC's 54th National Conference in December 2017, Ramokgopa was elected to the party's National Executive Committee (NEC). She was later co-opted onto the NEC's National Working Committee. In 2022 she assumed additional duties at the ANC's headquarters at Luthuli House: as ANC Secretary-General Ace Magashule was suspended and Deputy Secretary-General Jessie Duarte was ill, she was recruited as a coordinator in the Secretary-General's office to assist acting Secretary-General Paul Mashatile (who was simultaneously fulfilling his main role as Treasurer-General). Ramokgopa was generally described as a political ally of incumbent national President and ANC President Cyril Ramaphosa.

=== ANC Treasurer-General: 2022– ===
Ahead of the ANC's 55th National Conference, Ramokgopa was viewed as a likely candidate for the position of ANC Secretary-General. In October 2022, she was listed as the preferred Treasurer-General on a slate of candidates endorsed and circulated by figures in the party's pro-Ramaphosa faction. During the nominations phase, however, local party branches were not sufficiently supportive of her campaign for her to appear on the provisional ballot.

When the conference began in December 2022, Ramokgopa received two last-minute nominations from the floor of the conference. She declined a nomination to stand as Deputy Secretary-General, but accepted a nomination to stand as Treasurer-General. On 19 December, it was announced that she had won the election with 41.76% of the vote in a crowded race: she received 1,809 votes, compared with 1,652 to Pule Mabe, 590 to Bejani Chauke, and 281 to Mzwandile Masina.

== Personal life ==
She is married to Allen Lephoko, with whom she has three children.
