= William R. Jacobs Jr. =

American geneticist

Bill Jacobs
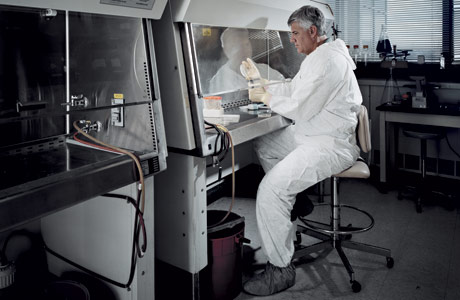
- Dr. Jacobs in the lab- Esquire, "Best and Brightest" 2007
- Born: March 13, 1955 (age 71); Pittsburgh, Pennsylvania, United States
- Education: Edinboro University of Pennsylvania; University of Alabama at Birmingham
- Known for: Developing genetics for Mycobacterium tuberculosis
- Scientific career
- Fields: Microbiology
- Workplaces: Albert Einstein College of Medicine
- Doctoral advisor: Roy Curtiss III

William R. Jacobs Jr., is a professor of Microbiology and Immunology and Professor of Genetics at Albert Einstein College of Medicine in The Bronx, New York, where he is also a Howard Hughes Medical Institute Investigator. Jacobs is a specialist in the molecular genetics of Mycobacteria. His research efforts are aimed at discovering genes associated with virulence and pathogenicity in M. tuberculosis and developing attenuated strains for use as vaccines. He is a Founding Scientist at the KwaZulu-Natal Research Institute for Tuberculosis and HIV.

== Early career ==
In 1985, Jacobs joined Barry Bloom's lab at Albert Einstein College of Medicine as a post-doctoral fellow to work on the resurgent problem of tuberculosis. In 1987, the two co-authored a ground-breaking paper published in Nature describing a novel system for the genetic manipulation of mycobacteria, "Introduction of Foreign DNA into Mycobacteria Using a Shuttle Phasmid". By demonstrating the utility of shuttle phasmids as DNA transporters between E. coli plasmids and mycobacteriophages, this paved the way for recombinant DNA research for mycobacteria.

== Howard Hughes Medical Institute investigator (1990-present) ==
Jacobs has been profiled several times in media publications including The New York Times, Esquire Magazine, and Discovery.
