= Life Esidimeni scandal =

Killings of patients with starvation and neglect

- Location within South Africa
- Time: 2016
- Location: Gauteng, South Africa; 26.2708°S 28.1123°E
- Cause: Starvation, neglect. Mentally ill patients moved to improper care institutions.
- Casualties: 1500+ state patients were affected
- Deaths: 144

The Life Esidimeni tragedy involved the deaths of 144 people at psychiatric facilities in the Gauteng province of South Africa from causes including starvation and neglect. The tragedy takes its name from Life Esidimeni, a subsidiary of Life Healthcare, the private healthcare provider from which some 1 500 state patients were removed from the Life Esidimeni Care Centre in the first half of 2016. The patients were relocated to cheaper care centres, many of which were later found to be unlicensed and grossly under-resourced. The incident has been called "the greatest cause of human rights violation" in democratic South Africa, and stimulated discussion about the care of psychiatric and other state patients. As of 2021, no criminal charges had been laid against any individuals involved, but a judicial inquest into the deaths was ongoing. In 2024, a judge ruled that former MEC Qedani Mahlangu and Makgoba Manamela (former head of mental health in Gauteng) could be prosecuted for the deaths of the patients.

== The "Mental Health Marathon Project" ==
In October 2015, the provincial Department of Health in Gauteng announced the termination of its outsourced care contract with a private health care provider, Life Esidimeni, which had been providing specialised psychiatric care to state patients. According to the Gauteng Member of the Executive Council (MEC) for Health, Qedani Mahlangu, the political head of the Department, the Department terminated the contract to save money and enact a policy of "deinstitutionalising" psychiatric patients. Between March and June 2016, about 1 500 psychiatric patients (up to 1 700 on some accounts) were moved out of Life Esidimeni and into the care of over 100 different NGOs, psychiatric hospitals, and community care facilities. This mass transfer of patients was known in the Department as the "Gauteng Mental Health Marathon Project." Later investigation revealed many attempts to warn the Department of the consequences of transferring patients to NGOs incapable of providing the specialised care they required, including court actions by civil society organisations and patients' families to interdict the transfers. In one instance, the Department avoided an interdict by coming to a court settlement it was later found to have dishonoured.

It later transpired that many of the centres which received patients were unlicensed or fraudulently licensed, while others transparently lacked the skills, resources, and patient records to provide adequate care. Family members of deceased patients reported that they had seen patients walking around naked, that one NGO gave the set of medications to every patient, and that bodies were badly decomposed. The 2018 arbitration report found that 144 people had died, and that many others had been exposed to trauma. According to death certificates, patients died of causes including hypothermia and dehydration, although many certificates listed natural causes.

== Health ombud's report ==
In September 2016, in the Gauteng legislature, Mahlangu first reported that 36 of the transferred patients had died, although it later emerged that there had been at least 77 deaths by then. In late 2016, the Health Ombud, Malegapuru Makgoba, was appointed by the national Minister of Health, Aaron Motsoaledi, to investigate the deaths. The report was released on 1 February 2017, after its publication had been delayed by Mahlangu, who wanted time to peruse the document before providing feedback. It was based on investigation, interviews, and inspections by the Ombud and a panel of experts, as well as on inspections by the Office of Health Standards Compliance and further investigations by the Ministerial Advisory Committee on Mental Health.

=== Findings ===
The Health Ombud's report detailed the 94 known cases in which mental healthcare patients had died in Gauteng between 23 March and 19 December 2016. It found that 81 of those deaths had been related to the termination of the Life Esidimeni contract. The Ombud took issue with some of the government's reporting on the deaths, and argued that, even when deaths had been recorded as arising from natural causes, "the conditions and circumstances at NGOs made these deaths other than 'natural.'" Moreover, the report found "prima facie evidence" that the department, its officials, and certain NGOs had violated the Constitution, the National Mental Health Act, and the Mental Health Care Act; and that some government actions showed "a total disregard of the rights of the patients and their families." The decision to terminate the Life Esidimeni contract had been "unwise and flawed," and the Mental Health Marathon Project's inadequate planning and "chaotic" execution was described as "most negligent and reckless" and showing "a total lack of respect for human dignity, care and human life."

According to the report, most violations and deaths occurred among patients transferred to NGOs. There were 27 such NGOs, all of which were found to be operating unlawfully, under invalid licenses. The NGOs lacked "basic competence and experience," "leadership/managerial capacity," and sufficient resources, all of which precipitated or was otherwise linked with the high number of deaths in those facilities. 75 of the 94 confirmed deaths occurred at only five NGO complexes:

- Cullinan Care and Rehabilitation Centre, including Siyabadinga and Anchor Centre (25 deaths)
- Precious Angels Home (20 deaths)
- Mosego Home and Takalani Home (15 deaths)
- Tshepong Centre (10 death)
- Hephzibah Home Care (5 deaths)

=== Recommendations ===
The report singled out three officials as "key players" in the Mental Health Marathon Project: the head of the provincial Department of Health, Tiego "Barney" Selebano; the provincial head of mental health services, Makgabo Manamela; and Mahlangu. Amongst other things, it recommended that the Premier should "consider the suitability" of Mahlangu to continue in her role as MEC, and should institute disciplinary proceedings against Selebano, Manamela, and other department officials. Makgoba recommended that the Mental Health Marathon Project should cease to exist, that all patients should urgently be relocated to appropriate care facilities, and that certain facilities should be reviewed or immediately closed. Finally, he recommended that an alternative dispute resolution process should be instituted, and the families of the victims compensated.

== Aftermath ==
=== Implicated officials ===
In February 2017, Mahlangu resigned from the Executive Council, following the release of the Health Ombud's report. The Premier suspended Selebano and Manamela, and several medical practitioners employed by the provincial government were referred to professional bodies on misconduct charges, including Selebano to the Health Professions Council of South Africa and others to the South African Nursing Council.

=== Arbitration report and award ===
In March 2018, arbitrator Dikgang Moseneke found that the decision to move the patients had been "irrational and in blatant breach of the law and the Constitution," an "irrational and arrogant use of public power." He ruled that families of the affected patients should each be paid around R1.2 million, made up of R180,000 for shock and psychological trauma, R1 million in constitutional damages, and, in cases where the family member had died, R20,000 for funeral expenses. The constitutional damages, Moseneke said, were to compensate "for the government's unjustifiable and reckless breaches" of the Constitution. The Gauteng government reportedly paid R159 million in compensation in June 2018, but in December several hundred families said they had not yet received any payments. Moseneke also directed the government to erect a monument in memorial, but, as of July 2021, this had not been done.

=== Criminal investigations and inquest ===
The South African Police Service and the Special Investigating Unit investigated. In April 2017, all 144 dockets were referred to the National Prosecuting Authority, which announced in September 2019 that it had not found sufficient evidence to bring charges. On 19 July 2021, a judicial inquest commenced in the Pretoria High Court to determine the legal cause of each patient's death, with a view towards establishing criminal liability. It is ongoing.
