= Ncoza Dlova =

South African dermatologist

- Born: Mtyolo, Eastern Cape, South Africa
- Education: University of KwaZulu-Natal (MBChB; Dermatology specialization)
- Occupations: Dermatologist, academic
- Employer: University of KwaZulu-Natal
- Known for: Research on ethnic skin and hair disorders; co-discovery of genetic cause of Central Centrifugal Cicatricial Alopecia (CCCA)
- Notable work: Variant PAD13 in Central Centrifugal Cicatricial Alopecia
- Title: Dean, School of Clinical Medicine

Ncoza Dlova is a South African dermatologist. In 2019, she helped discover a new gene that is a major cause of permanent hair loss amongst women of African descent. She is currently the dean and the first African woman to head University of KwaZulu-Natal's School of Clinical Medicine.

== Early years and education ==
Dlova was born in Mtyolo, a small village in the Eastern Cape, South Africa. For six years, she studied medicine at the University of KwaZulu-Natal, after which she specialized in the field of dermatology for four years at the same school. As a result, she became the first black dermatologist produced by the university.

== Career ==
She is one of the first few black dermatologists in South Africa, a principal specialist and senior consultant in charge of five regional and tertiary dermatology outpatients clinics in South Africa. She has conducted and collaborated on research works which have received international acclaim. For instance, she collaborated with scientists in the US to discover the root cause of Central Centrifugal Cicatricial Alopecia (CCCA), one of the most common causes of scarring alopecia amongst African women. She also collaborated with chemists to research the analysis of skin lighteners.

She is also known to have been running workshops in partnership with the KZN Albinism Society of South Africa to increase awareness and understanding about the genetic skin and eye condition and to fight against discrimination and stigmatisation of people with albinism.

== Works ==
Her research usually focuses on ethnic skin and hair, pigmentation disorders, as well as HIV and skin. She is known to have written three books on dermatology and contributed eight chapters in major dermatology textbooks. Some of her publications include:

- Variant PAD13 in Central Centrifugal Cicatricial Alopecia

== Recognitions ==
- Elected Africa dermatologist on the International Board of Unilever USA
- She is an Executive member of the African Society of Dermatology and Venereology (ASDV)
- She is the inaugural President of the newly formed Women's Dermatological Society of South Africa
- She established the Dermatology Registrar Association of South Africa (DRASA) whose aim is to guide and mentor dermatology registrars in South Africa
