= Leader of Government Business (South Africa) =

Government position created in 1994

Leader of Government Business of Parliament of South Africa
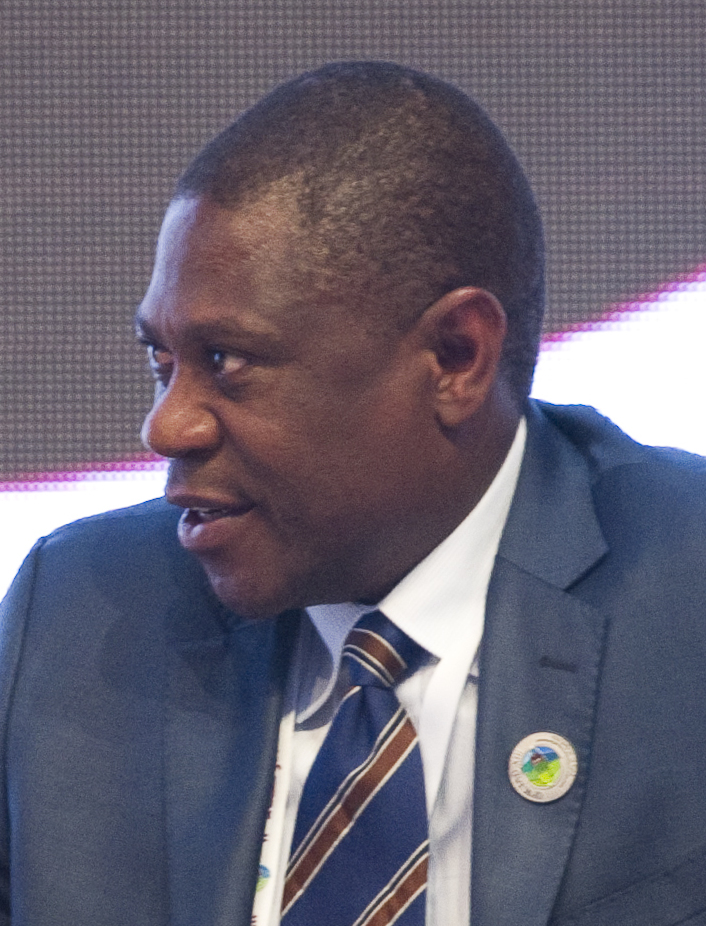
- Incumbent; Paul Mashatile since 7 March 2023
- The Presidency
- Style: The Honourable
- Member of: Cabinet
- Appointer: President
- Term length: No fixed term
- Constituting instrument: Constitution of South Africa
- Website: The Presidency

The office of the Leader of Government Business was established in 1994, concurrent with South Africa's transition to democracy. This position, which is traditionally held by the Deputy President, was created to support the President in executing governmental duties and to lead government business in the Parliament of South Africa. Although the specific responsibilities of the role have undergone changes over time, it remains a vital component of the country's governmental framework.

The Leader of Government Business is appointed by the President of South Africa and is responsible for:

- Overseeing the fulfillment of Cabinet's duties
- Ensuring the timely and correct handling of legislation initiated by Cabinet
- Leading the government's legislative program in Parliament
- Coordinating the government's business in Parliament
- Performing any other function provided for by the Joint Rules or a resolution of the National Assembly or the National Council of Provinces

The position is currently held by the Deputy President of the country.

== List of Officeholders ==
Parties

National Party
African National Congress

No.	Portrait	Name (Birth–Death)	Term of office			President	Political party
No.	Portrait	Name (Birth–Death)	Took office	Left office	Time in office	President	Political party
1		F. W. de Klerk (1936–2021)	10 May 1994	30 June 1996 (resigned)	2 years, 51 days	Nelson Mandela	National Party
2		Thabo Mbeki (born 1942)	10 May 1994	14 June 1999 (became president)	5 years, 35 days	Nelson Mandela	African National Congress
3		Jacob Zuma (born 1942)	14 June 1999	14 June 2005 (dismissed but became president on 9 May 2009)	6 years, 0 days	Thabo Mbeki	African National Congress
4		Phumzile Mlambo-Ngcuka (born 1955)	14 June 2005	23 September 2008 (resigned)	3 years, 101 days	Thabo Mbeki	African National Congress
5		Baleka Mbete (born 1949)	25 September 2008	9 May 2009 (term ended)	226 days	Kgalema Motlanthe	African National Congress
6		Kgalema Motlanthe (born 1949)	9 May 2009	26 May 2014 (term ended)	5 years, 17 days	Jacob Zuma	African National Congress
7		Cyril Ramaphosa (born 1952)	26 May 2014	15 February 2018 (became president)	3 years, 265 days	Jacob Zuma	African National Congress
8		David Mabuza (1960–2025)	27 February 2018	28 February 2023 (resigned)	5 years, 1 day	Cyril Ramaphosa	African National Congress
9		Paul Mashatile (born 1961)	7 March 2023	19 June 2024	3 years, 184 days	Cyril Ramaphosa	African National Congress
