= Brian Hlongwa =

South African politician (died 2025)

Member of the Gauteng Executive Council for Health
- In office March 2006 – May 2009
- Premier: Mbhazima Shilowa; Paul Mashatile
- Preceded by: Gwen Ramokgopa
- Succeeded by: Qedani Mahlangu (for Health and Social Development)

Personal details
- Died: 23 December 2025
- Citizenship: South Africa
- Party: African National Congress

Thamsanqa Brian Hlongwa (died 23 December 2025) was a South African politician who was Gauteng's Member of the Executive Council (MEC) for Health from March 2006 to May 2009. He was a member of the African National Congress and served multiple terms on the party's Provincial Executive Committee in Gauteng. He was also the party's Chief Whip in the Gauteng Provincial Legislature until October 2018, when he resigned amid a corruption scandal relating to his tenure as Health MEC. He was charged with fraud and corruption in late 2021.

== Political career ==
In his youth, Hlongwa was active in anti-apartheid politics as a member of the Soweto Civic Association and Soweto Youth Congress, and he worked for the City of Johannesburg from 1996 to 2000. He later served as a local councillor and Member of the Mayoral Committee in Johannesburg. By 2006, he was a member of the Provincial Executive Committee of the Gauteng branch of the African National Congress (ANC).

=== Gauteng Executive Council ===
On 23 March that year, he was appointed to the Gauteng Executive Council by Mbhazima Shilowa, then the Premier of Gauteng. He became Member of the Executive Council (MEC) for Health, succeeding Gwen Ramokgopa, who had been elected Mayor of Tshwane in the recent local government elections. He retained the portfolio throughout the rest of Shilowa's tenure and was also retained by Shilowa's successor, Paul Mashatile, who was Premier from 2008 to 2009. After the 2009 general election, newly elected Premier Nomvula Mokonyane appointed Qedani Mahlangu to succeed him as MEC.

=== Gauteng Provincial Legislature ===
After his dismissal from the Executive Council, Hlongwa remained a member of the Gauteng Provincial Legislature, and he was re-elected to his seat in the 2014 general election, ranked eighth on the ANC's provincial party list. By July 2014, he was the Chief Whip of the Majority Party, the ANC, in the provincial legislature. Also in 2014, he was viewed as a frontrunner to succeed David Makhura as Provincial Secretary of the ANC's Gauteng branch; although he was not elected to the position, he was elected to another four-year term on the party's Provincial Executive Committee. He was re-elected to the committee in July 2018, ranked 29th by popularity of the 30 elected members. The Mail & Guardian said that he was viewed as a close political ally of former Premier Paul Mashatile.

Yet by July 2018, Hlongwa was embroiled in controversy due to renewed public attention to allegations that he had been implicated in corruption while Health MEC from 2006 to 2009. The Gauteng ANC referred his case, and that of Qedani Mahlangu – another controversial former Health MEC who had been elected to the Provincial Executive Committee – to the ANC's internal Integrity Commission at the national and provincial level. On 30 October 2018, while the ANC was still considering his case, he issued a statement announcing his resignation as Chief Whip. Although he denied the allegations against him, he said that his decision

has been informed by the need to resolve the eight-year long accusations, without having the matter aired in the courts of the country. Furthermore, the African National Congress is committed to natural justice and my continued stay as the chief whip in the GPL [Gauteng Provincial Legislature] would have distracted the movement from its task of mobilising our people behind a programme to unite, renew and create jobs.

Shortly afterwards, the provincial party announced that it had resolved that Hlongwa should not hold public office until he was cleared of the allegations; however, the Provincial Executive Committee rejected a further recommendation by the provincial Integrity Commission to suspend his membership, both of the party and of the Provincial Executive Committee. In December, the ANC National Executive Committee overruled the provincial party, ordering Hlongwa to resign from the Provincial Executive Committee. He lost his legislative seat in the 2019 general election, and in 2022 he also resigned from a job at the O. R. Tambo School of Leadership, the ANC's political school, in order to address the corruption allegations against him.

== Corruption charges ==
Allegations of corruption against Hlongwa received public attention as early as 2009, when he was still Health MEC, but became particularly prominent in 2014, when the National Prosecuting Authority (NPA) said that it intended to press charges against him. In July 2014, the NPA successfully applied for a court order allowing it to freeze R1.4 billion in assets – apparently the largest freezing order ever obtained by the NPA at that time – which it said were the proceeds of crime. It said that the asset forfeiture was part of an investigation by the Hawks and the Special Investigating Unit (SIU) that had been ongoing for four years.

In March 2017, the SIU completed its investigation and handed a report to the incumbent President Jacob Zuma, who did not publish the findings until obliged to by a Promotion of Access to Information Act request by Section27, a non-profit, in 2018. The investigation covered the period from 2006 to May 2014, when Hlongwa was Health MEC, and claimed to have uncovered more than R1.2 billion in corruption in the Gauteng Department of Health over that period. In particular, the SIU claimed that 3P Consulting, a private company headed by Hlongwa's friend Richard Payne, was granted state contracts that had been awarded irregularly and at inflated prices. The SIU had referred the matter to the NPA and the Treatment Action Campaign called for Hlongwa to be prosecuted.

In late 2021, Hlongwa was arrested in connection with the investigation. He and seven others, including his wife, were charged with offences under the Prevention of Organised Crime Act, including fraud, corruption, and money laundering, which the NPA alleged they had committed between 2006 and 2010. The NPA said that Hlongwa, Richard Payne, and 3P Consulting, acting with others, were at the centre of a pattern of racketeering at the Gauteng Health Department during that period. Hlongwa was granted R20,000 bail in December 2021, and his trial continued in 2022.

== Personal life and death ==
Hlongwa married in 1998 and divorced in 2022. He died after a short illness on 23 December 2025.
