= K-RITH =

South African research institute

- Purpose: HIV and Tuberculosis research
- Location: Durban, KwaZulu-Natal, South Africa
- Website: http://www.k-rith.org/

K-RITH (Kwazulu-Natal Research Institute for Tuberculosis and HIV) was a tuberculosis and HIV research institute in Durban, South Africa. The Institute is a collaboration of the Howard Hughes Medical Institute and the University of KwaZulu-Natal. K-RITH's 7-story research facility is situated on the Nelson R Mandela School of Medicine Campus at UKZN and opened on 9 October 2012.

== Building ==
The home of K-RITH is a seven-story, 4000 sq. meter research building on the grounds of the Nelson R. Mandela School of Medicine at the University of KwaZulu-Natal. The building was designed by FGG Architects and includes Biosafety level 3 (BSL3) laboratories, able to handle pathogens such as Mycobacterium tuberculosis, the causative agent of TB, as well as HIV the causative agent of AIDS. Approximately 10 K-RITH research groups will conduct research in the building, and office space will be used by other organisations, such as CAPRISA. The K-RITH Tower Building, as it is officially named, cost R346m to build, and was officially opened on 9 October 2012, to a crowd of many local and international dignitaries, including the South African Minister of Health, Aaron Motsoaledi.

In 2016, K-RITH merged with the African Centre for Population Health to form the Africa Health Research Institute.
