= Jules Browde =

South African advocate and acting judge

- Born: 1919
- Died: 31 May 2016 (aged 96–97)
- Occupations: Advocate and Acting judge

Jules Browde (1919 – 31 May 2016) was a South African advocate and acting judge as well as a human-rights activist and Jewish communal leader. He was a classmate of Nelson Mandela's and a founder member of Lawyers for Human Rights.

== Career ==
Browde graduated with a Bachelor of Arts degree from the University of the Witwatersrand (Wits) and then joined the Union Defence Force in the early part of the Second World War. At the end of the war, he returned to Wits to continue his education; during that time, he became friends with Nelson Mandela, a fellow law student.

In 1996, two years after South Africa's first democratic elections, Mandela appointed Browde to investigate irregularities in the appointment of various civil servants.

In 1969, Browde had been made a silk, or senior counsel, and went on to serve as an acting judge in South Africa as well as judge on the appeal courts of Lesotho and Swaziland.

He chaired the Johannesburg Bar Council on several occasions.

== Awards and other activities ==
In July 2008, Browde's service was acknowledged with the Sydney and Felicia Kentridge Award. The award is made by the South African Bar Council for excellence in public interest law.

In 2011, the SA Jewish Report recognized Browde and his wife Professor Selma Browde with the Helen Suzman Lifetime Achievement Award.

Browde served as national president of the Habonim youth movement for 25 years. In 2005, he planted a tree to mark the 70th Habonim reunion while in Israel during his last visit to that country.

== Personal life ==
Jules Browde was married to professor Selma Browde, a renowned senior radiation oncologist at Wits and the Johannesburg group of hospitals. The couple were married for nearly 70 years and had three sons: Ian, Alan, and Paul.
