= University of KwaZulu-Natal =

Public university in KwaZulu-Natal, South Africa

Coordinates: 29.86752°S 30.98081°E

- Other name: UKZN
- Motto: Inspiring Greatness
- Type: Public
- Established: 1 January 2004; 22 years ago (as merger of UN (est. 1910) and UDW (est. 1960s))
- Academic affiliations: AAU; ACU; HESA
- Chancellor: Reuel Jethro Khoza
- Vice-Chancellor: Nana Poku
- Academic staff: 1,328 (2016)
- Students: 46,539 (2016)
- Undergraduates: 24,897 (2007)
- Postgraduates: 3,807 (2007)
- Location: Durban, Westville, Pinetown and Pietermaritzburg, KwaZulu-Natal, South Africa
- Campus: 5 campuses Westville Campus (Main campus), Nelson. R. Mandela School of Medicine, Howard College Campus, Edgewood Campus and Pietermaritzburg Campus
- Colours: Black and red
- Sporting affiliations: Varsity Cup
- Website: ukzn.ac.za

The University of KwaZulu-Natal (UKZN; Zulu: INyuvesi yakwaZulu-Natali, Afrikaans: Universiteit van KwaZulu-Natal) is a public research university with five campuses in the province of KwaZulu-Natal in South Africa. It was formed on 1 January 2004 after the merger between the University of Natal and the University of Durban-Westville.

== History ==
The university was formed by the merger of the University of Natal and the University of Durban-Westville, in 2004.

The Council of the University of Natal voted on 31 May 2002 to offer the post of Vice-Chancellor and University Principal to world-renowned medical scientist and former Medical Research Council President – Professor Malegapuru Makgoba, who assumed office on 1 September 2002. He was entrusted with leading the University of Natal into the merger with the University of Durban-Westville. In so doing, he became the last Vice-Chancellor of the University of Natal. Professor Makgoba succeeded Professor Brenda Gourley as Vice-Chancellor.

Having served a brief stint as the interim Vice-Chancellor in 2004 he was formally appointed as the founding Vice-Chancellor of the newly merged University of KwaZulu-Natal. He was installed at a ceremony on 30 September 2005.

Professor Makgoba served two five-year terms of office and retired in 2015. His tenure, however, was plagued with controversies. Makgoba is said to have created a "culture of hostility" at the university that resulted in an exodus of world-class academics. He was succeeded by Dr Albert van Jaarsveld.

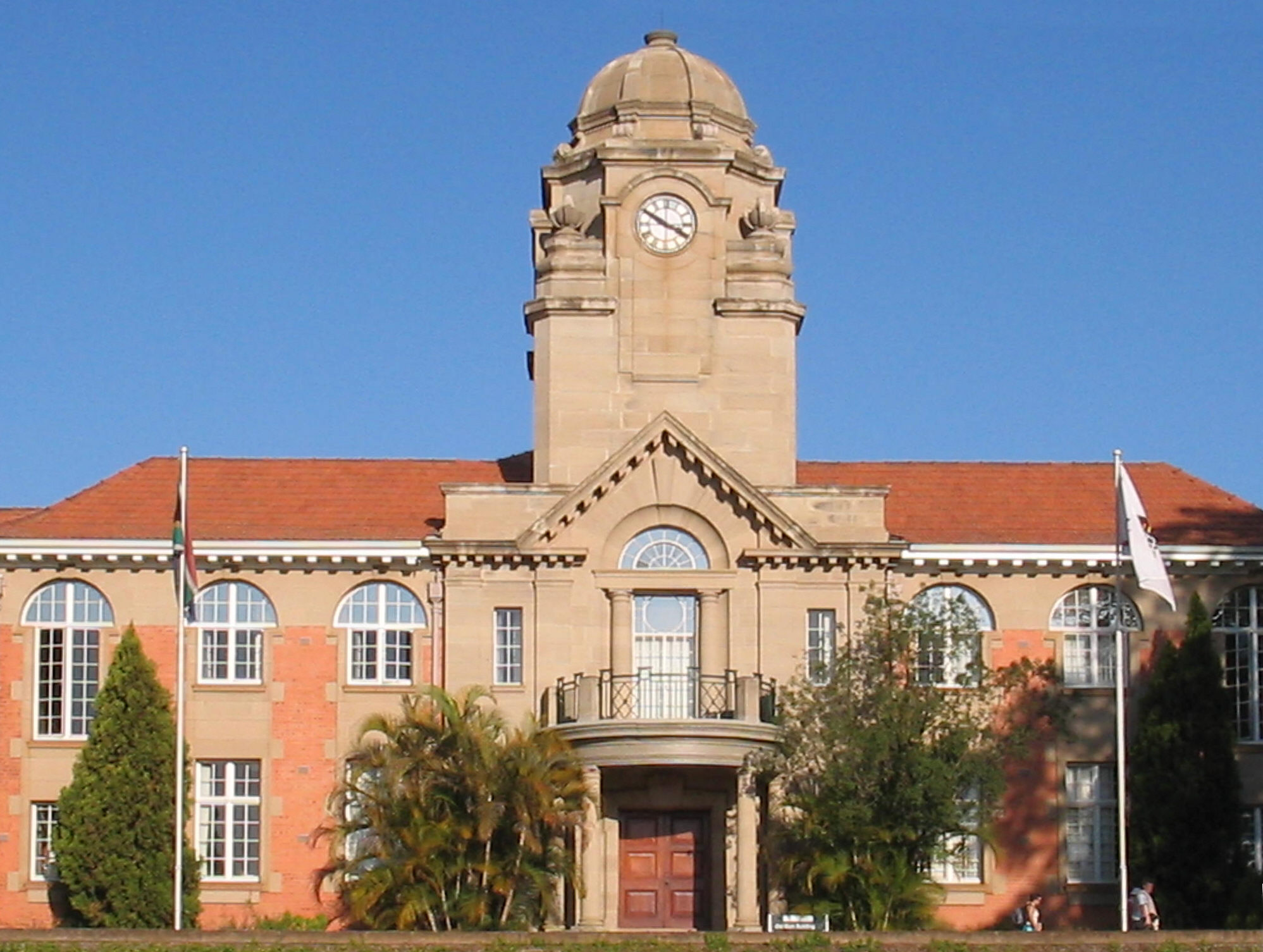
The main clock tower of Old Main Building, on the Pietermaritzburg campus.

=== University of Durban-Westville ===
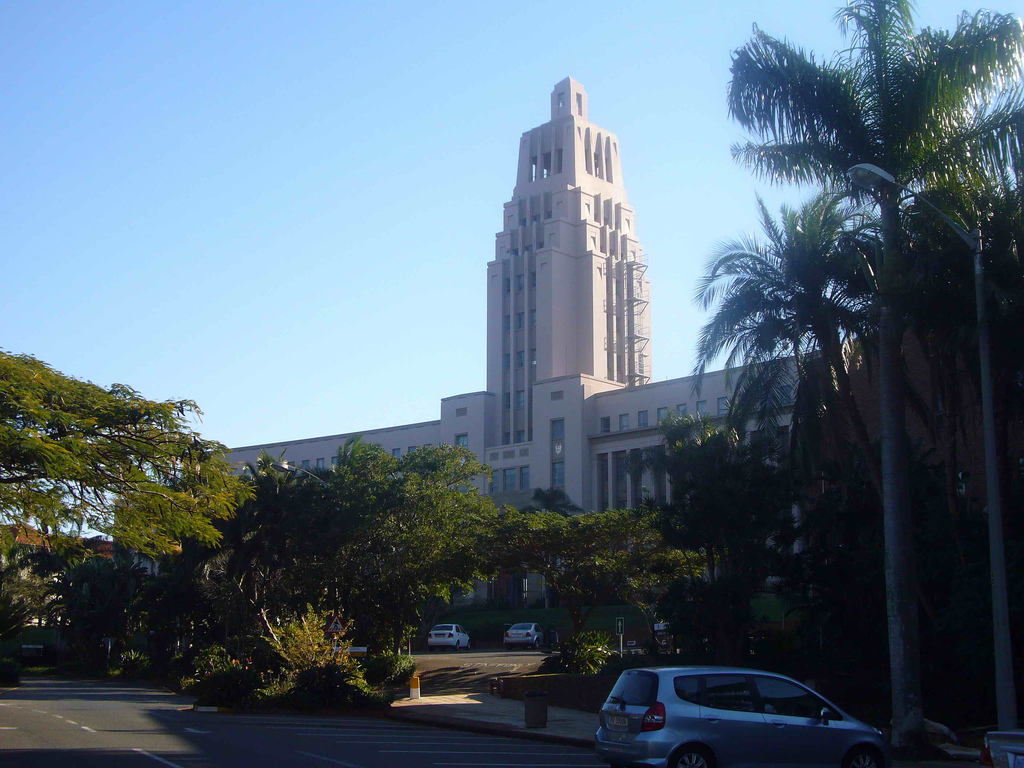
The Memorial Tower Building on the Howard College Campus in Durban, University of KwaZulu-Natal

== Organisation ==
The university is governed in accordance with the Higher Education Act of 1997, and its constitution is specified in the Statute of the University of KwaZulu-Natal, as approved by the South African Minister of Education and the Parliament of South Africa.

In the statute, the university consists of:

- the chancellor (the titular head). The first chancellor of the merged university was Dr Frene Ginwala. It is currently Chief Justice Mogoeng Mogoeng.
- the vice chancellor (the executive head)
- two or more deputy vice chancellors (currently there are five full and one acting)
- the registrar (responsible for registering students)
- the council (responsible for governance of the institution as a whole)
- the senate (responsible for governance of academic activities)
- the students representative council (responsible for students representation)
- the institutional forum (responsible for advising the council on matters of human rights and equality)
- the colleges (currently there are four)
- the academic and support staff
- the students
- the convocation (all the alumni and some others)

== Academic structure ==
The university is made up of four colleges, which are in turn made up of several schools. In most cases, a subdivision is spread across one or more of the university's campuses. For example, chemistry is in both the Pietermaritzburg and Westville campuses.

=== College of Agriculture, Engineering and Science ===
- School of Engineering(all)
- School of Agriculture and Science

=== College of Health Sciences ===
- School of Medicine
- School of Health Sciences

=== College of Humanities ===
- School of Arts
- School of Social Sciences
- School of Education
- School of Religion, Philosophy and Classics

=== College of Law and Management Studies ===
- Graduate School of Business and Leadership (Business Management Association in cooperation with Hampton College Durban)
- School of Commerce
- School of Law

An institute built in cooperation with the Howard Hughes Medical Institute is the new KwaZulu-Natal Research Institute for Tuberculosis and HIV, opened in 2012. It is on the Nelson Mandela School of Medicine campus.

== Campuses ==
The university is geographically divided into five distinct campuses, which partially correspond to its managerial and academic divisions. Two campuses (Edgewood and the Medical School) house specific academic divisions (education and medicine respectively), but the remainder of the university's academic divisions span Howard College, Pietermaritzburg and Westville.

=== Pietermaritzburg campus ===
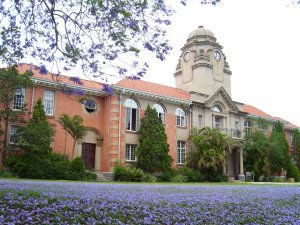
UKZN Pietermaritzburg Campus

Pietermaritzburg campus was the main location of the University of Natal and its predecessor, the Natal University College, until the opening of the Howard College campus in Durban. This campus contains the university's oldest structure, Old Main Building, built in 1912. Pietermaritzburg campus offers a broad range of academic degrees and is the only UKZN campus providing training in agriculture, theology and fine arts.

=== Howard College campus ===
Howard College campus was the Durban location of the University of Natal until the 2004 merger. It is located on the Berea Ridge. and is situated in a thriving environmental conservancy. The campus was opened in 1931, having been donated by Mr T. B. Davis, in honor of his son, Howard Davis, who died in the Battle of the Somme during the first world war. Howard College offers a wide range of degrees, with a large engineering department consisting of Electrical engineering and Chemical engineering. The College of Humanities and College of Law and Management are also positioned on this campus together with the Centre For Creative Arts (CCA) and the Elizabeth Sneddon Theatre which host annually the Durban International Film Festival (DIFF), Poetry Africa, Time of the Writer and the creative dance festival JOMBA! which is produced by the FlatFoot Dance company.

=== Westville campus ===
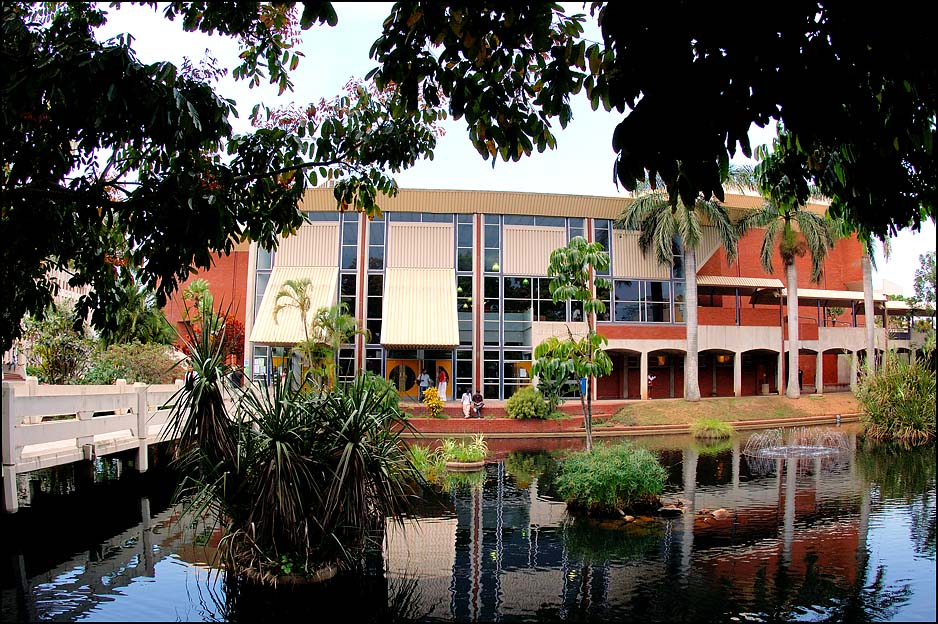
UKZN Westville Campus

Westville campus is in an environmental conservancy in Westville, about 10 km west of Durban. It was formerly the site of the University of Durban-Westville before the 2004 merger. Westville offers a range of degrees, and will soon be the main home of the disciplines of commerce and management.

=== Nelson Mandela medical school ===
Nelson Mandela medical school campus, created in 1950, was originally a racially segregated part of the University of Natal reserved for non-white students. It was one of the few tertiary institutions legally allowed to provide education to black people under apartheid. It was granted Nelson Mandela's name on its 50th anniversary in 2000. The medical school is the home of health sciences.

=== Edgewood campus ===
Edgewood campus is located in Pinetown, about 20 km west of Durban. The buildings originally formed the Edgewood College of Education, which was incorporated into the University of Natal in 2001. Edgewood is the main location of the university's Faculty of Education, current dean is Prof Mgqwashu.

== Student profile ==
Student Enrollment at the University of Kwa-Zulu Natal by Race
Ethnic Group	2004 number	2004 (%)	2016 Number	2016 (%)	2018 Number	2018 (%)	2020 number	2020 (%)
Black	15,995	49.5%	33,292	71.56%	37,530	77.83%	29,449	83.1%
Indian	11,156	34.5%	10,176	21.87%	8,313	17.24%	5000	14.1%
White	4,257	13.2%	1,885	4.05%	1,300	2.70%	357	1%
Coloured	895	2.8%	968	2.08%	877	1.82%	570	1.6%
Other	4	0.0%	199	0.43%	200	0.41%	68	0%
Total	32,325	100%	46,520	100%	48,220	100%	35,444	100%

University of Kwa-Zulu Natal Staff by Race (2016)
Race	Number	Percentage
Black	2,289	55%
Coloured	137	3.32%
Indian	1,028	21.71%
White	505	12.13%
Total	4,161	100%

== Student life ==
UKZN is home to various student organizations such as debating unions, film clubs, poetry societies,student political organizations, and sports teams.

The UKZN Rugby team - The UKZN Impi - features in the highly contested Varsity Cup national rugby competition, and the Howard College Debating Union competes in both the World Universities Debating Championships as well as the South African National Universities Debating Championships.

UKZN established the Centre for Creative Arts (CCA) in 1996. The CCA is a multi-disciplinary arts organisation based within the School of Arts at the University of KwaZulu-Natal. It coordinates several respected annual festivals, providing students with access to creative platforms and interesting opportunities aimed at developing their artistic talents. The four main festivals organized by the UKZN CCA are:

- Time of the Writer

The UKZN Time of the Writer festival invites international authors to take place in a variety of roundtable discussions, readings, seminars, book launches, and developmental programmes such as workshops, master classes and motivational talks. The festival has been running since 1998.

- Durban International Film Festival

First held in 1979, The Durban International Film Festival is one of the oldest and largest film festivals in southern Africa.

- JOMBA! Contemporary Dance Experience
- Poetry Africa

The UKZN Poetry Africa started in 1997, and features performances, readings, and book-launches from some poets

== Law clinics ==
UKZN has two law clinics, one in Pietermaritzburg and one in Durban, that provide free legal assistance to those that are unable to afford it. Specializing in the areas of HIV and AIDS, Family Law, and social justice matters, the UKZN law clinics are considered to be among the leading law clinics in the country. The law clinics also provide a practical training environment for final year law students, who are mentored by the clinic's experienced practitioners. Both clinics also engage directly with the communities throughout the province through regular outreach initiatives, where the students and legal practitioners travel to various remote, impoverished communities with the intention of providing access to justice for those that are most vulnerable.

== Rankings and reputation ==
University rankings

Global – Overall
- ARWU World: 501–600 (2023)
- QS World: =558 (2026)
- THE World: 501–600 (2024)

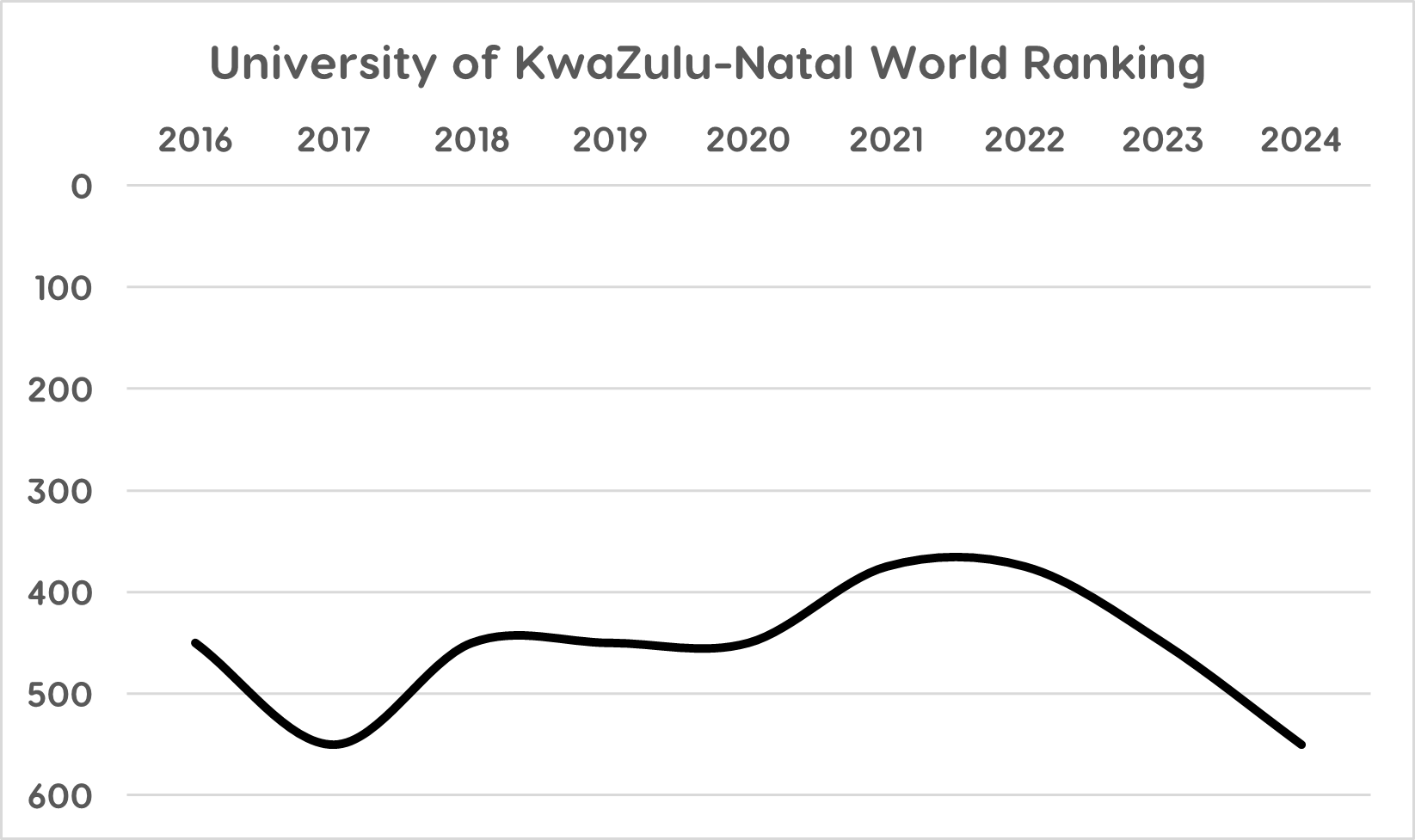
University of KwaZulu-Natal World Ranking

UKZN was ranked fourth out of the universities in South Africa by the Times Higher Education World University Rankings and sixth by the QS World University Rankings in 2018. UKZN has historically had a very strong reputation in the areas of science, technology, engineering, and mathematics, and is ranked first in the country for physical sciences and engineering, second for computer science, and third for mathematics. The university has also produced a number of prominent entrepreneurs and innovators. It was ranked first in Sub-Saharan Africa in Q4 2020 by the amount of venture capital funding raised by Unicorn startups founded by UKZN's alumni.

Internationally, UKZN is ranked in the 401-500 bracket by the Times Higher Education World University Rankings, and in the 701-750 bracket by the QS World University Rankings 2018. As of March 2021, it was ranked in the 801-1000 bracket by the QS World University Rankings.

UKZN Times Higher Education Ranking 2016 to 2024
Year	World Rank
2024	501–600
2023	401–500
2022	351–400
2021	351–400
2020	401–500
2019	401–500
2018	401–500
2017	501-600
2016	401-500

== Controversies ==
There have been a number of controversies at the University of KwaZulu-Natal since its foundation.

Firstly, there have been several staff strikes and student protests, with some protests from 2009 onward involving police intervention and the use of riot control measures, as well as violence on the part of some strikers.

Secondly, there have been a series of legal and disciplinary actions taken by senior university management against academics for speaking in public about the university. These actions have drawn wide criticism from academics and from organisations such as Cosatu and UNESCO.

They were also the cause of a 2008 staff strike.

== Notable alumni ==
- John Smit, World Cup winning South African Rugby Union captain.
- Imani Sanga, composer and ethnomusicologist
- Lize Heerman, singer-songwriter and media personality
- Gita Ramjee, scientist and researcher in HIV prevention
- Ncoza Dlova, first black dermatologist produced by the university and head of the School of Clinical Medicine
- Eunice Nangueve Inácio, Angolan peace activist
- Salome Maswime, global health expert and activist
- Mondo Mazwai, legal practitioner and chair South Africa's Competition Tribunal from 2019
- Mosa Moshabela, 11th Vice-Chancellor of the University of Cape Town
- Promise Mthembu, HIV/AIDS activist
- Nokwanda Makunga, biotechnologist
- Nomfundo Moh, platinum-awarded singer-songwriter
- Gerhard van der Bank, F1 driver

For alumni of the previous institutions see:

- Category:University of Natal alumni
- Category:University of Durban-Westville alumni

== See also ==
- Open access in South Africa and List of South African open access repositories
