= Aaron Motsoaledi =

South African politician (born 1958)

The Honourable Aaron Motsoaledi MP
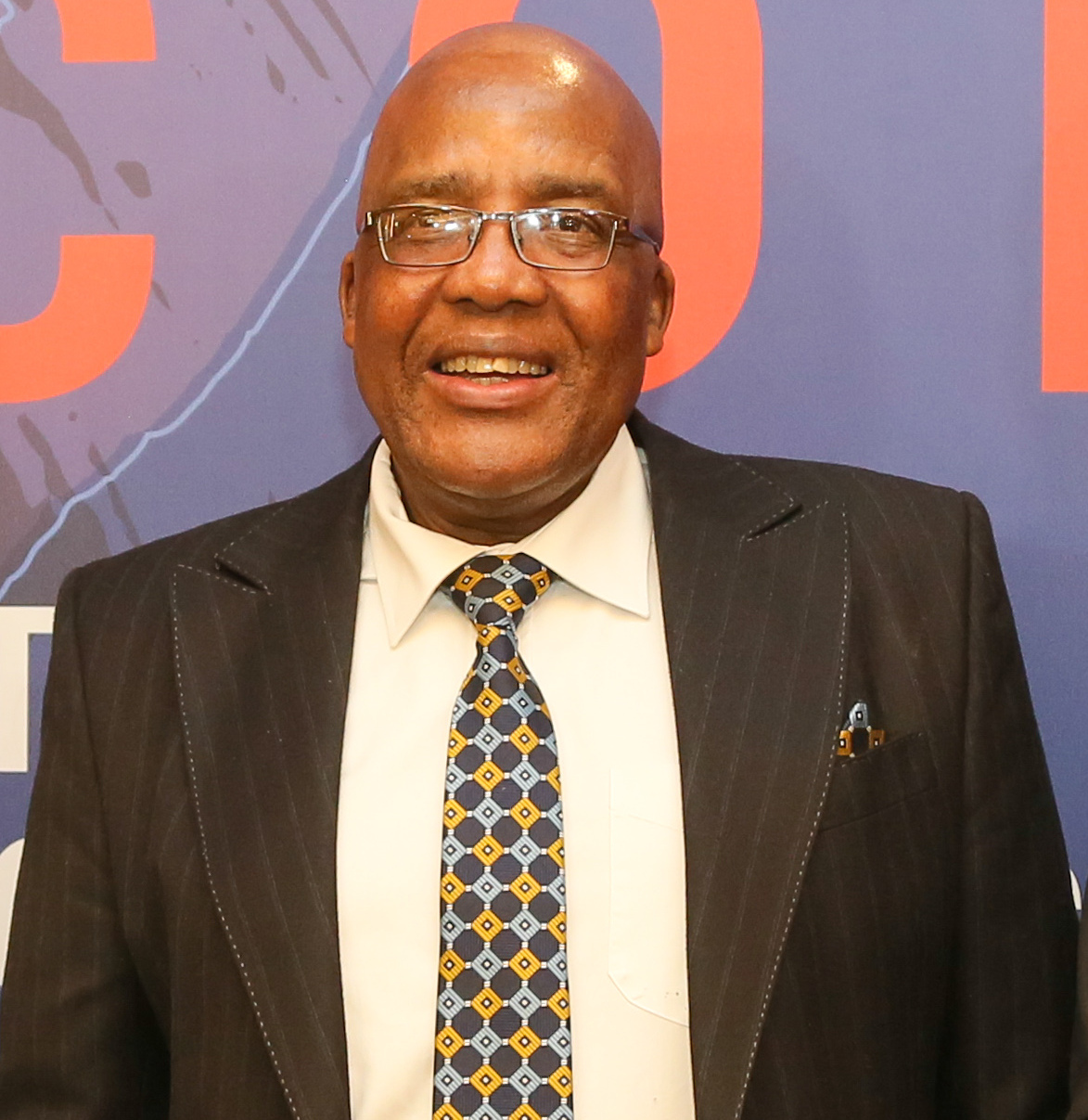
- Motsoaledi in 2023

24th and 27th Minister of Health
- Incumbent
- Assumed office 3 July 2024
- President: Cyril Ramaphosa
- Deputy: Joe Phaahla
- Preceded by: Joe Phaahla
- In office 11 May 2009 – 29 May 2019
- President: Jacob Zuma; Cyril Ramaphosa
- Preceded by: Barbara Hogan
- Succeeded by: Zweli Mkhize

Minister of Home Affairs
- In office 30 May 2019 – 30 June 2024
- President: Cyril Ramaphosa
- Deputy: Molefi Sefularo; Gwen Ramokgopa; Joe Phaahla
- Preceded by: Siyabonga Cwele
- Succeeded by: Leon Schreiber

Member of the National Assembly
- Incumbent
- Assumed office 6 May 2009

Personal details
- Born: Pakishe Aaron Motsoaledi; 7 August 1958 (age 68) Phokwane, Transvaal; South Africa
- Party: African National Congress
- Spouse: Thelma Dikeledi
- Relations: Elias Motsoaledi (uncle)
- Education: University of the North; University of Natal (MBChB)

Pakishe Aaron Motsoaledi (born 7 August 1958) is a South African politician. He is the Minister of Health in the cabinet of South Africa, having been appointed to this position with effect on 3 July 2024. He was previously the Minister of Home Affairs from 2019 to 2024 as well as the Minister of Health from 2009 to 2019. A member of the National Assembly since 2009, he is also a member of the National Executive Committee of the African National Congress (ANC).

Motsoaledi was born in Limpopo and trained as a medical doctor at the University of Natal, where he was active in the anti-apartheid student movement. In subsequent decades, he practiced as a doctor in Sekhukhuneland while remaining involved in political activism. After the end of apartheid, he represented the ANC in the Limpopo Provincial Legislature for three terms from 1994 to 2009. During that time, he served near-continuously in the Executive Council of Limpopo, holding several different portfolios under Premiers Ngoako Ramatlhodi and Sello Moloto. A long-time member of the ANC Provincial Executive Committee, he was elected to the National Executive Committee for the first time in December 2007.

After joining the National Assembly in the 2009 general election, Motsoaledi was appointed as Minister of Health in the cabinet of President Jacob Zuma. He held the position throughout Zuma's presidency, during which time he developed the policy and legislative framework for a new system of National Health Insurance. He also presided over a transformation in South Africa's policy on HIV/AIDS and a concomitant four-fold expansion in the size of the country's antiretroviral programme.

Zuma's successor, President Cyril Ramaphosa, appointed Motsoaledi as Minister of Home Affairs after the 2019 general election. He was elected to his fourth consecutive term on the ANC National Executive Committee in December 2022.

== Early life and education ==
Motsoaledi was born on 7 August 1958 in Phokwane, a village in the Sekhukhuneland region of the former Northern Transvaal (present-day Limpopo Province). He was one of nine children – seven boys and two girls – born to Kgokolo Michael Motsoaledi, a school principal, and Sina Sekeku Maile. As a child during apartheid, he was influenced by the arrest of a neighbour on a pass law offence, and later by the Soweto uprising of 1976. In addition, his paternal uncle was Elias Motsoaledi, a Rivonia Trialist and stalwart of the African National Congress (ANC).

After matriculating at the Setotolwane High School, Motsoaledi completed a pre-medical course at the University of the North at Turfloop, where he was involved in anti-apartheid student politics. He went on to study medicine at the University of Natal, where he served on the medical school's student representative council from 1980, succeeding Zweli Mkhize as its president in 1982. He was also a founding member of the Azanian Students' Organisation (AZASO) and was elected as its national correspondence secretary, serving under president Joe Phaahla. He attended the launch of the United Democratic Front (UDF) in Mitchells Plain in 1983 and helped establish UDF structures at the University of Natal. Later that year, he graduated with a Bachelor of Medicine, Bachelor of Surgery.

== Medical career and political activism ==
Motsoaledi practiced as a doctor in the Northern Transvaal, including through his own surgery in Jane Furse. At the same time, from 1986 to 1994, he was chairperson of the Sekhukhune Advice Office, which provided legal advice to anti-apartheid activists; in this capacity he worked with Nelson Diale and others. He was also chairperson of the Hlahlolanang Health and Nutrition Education Project in 1989. In addition, he maintained links to the outlawed ANC, including to an underground Umkhonto we Sizwe unit in Sekhukhuneland.

When the ANC was unbanned in 1990 during the negotiations to end apartheid, Motsoaledi became involved in running the party's overt structures in the Northern Transvaal. He was deputy chairperson of the Northern Transvaal branch from 1991 to 1992, and in 1994, ahead of the upcoming democratic elections, he was a member of the party's elections task team in the province. Aaron Motsoaledi Succeeded his eye surgery at public facility in south Africa .

== Limpopo Provincial Legislature: 1994–2009 ==
In the first post-apartheid elections in April 1994, Motsoaledi was elected to represent the ANC in the newly established Limpopo Provincial Legislature (then still named after the Northern Transvaal). He was also appointed to the Executive Council of Ngoako Ramatlhodi, the Premier of Limpopo, who named him as the province's inaugural Member of the Executive Council (MEC) for Education. He remained in the portfolio until 1 July 1997, when Ramatlhodi announced that Motsoaledi had been sacked and replaced by Joe Phaahla, his former AZASO colleague. He retreated briefly from the provincial executive, serving as an ordinary Member of the Provincial Legislature.

However, he returned to the Executive Council on 24 August 1998, when Ramatlhodi appointed him to succeed Benny Boshielo as MEC for Transport; his reappointment reportedly followed an intervention by ANC deputy president Jacob Zuma. After the 1999 general election, he swopped portfolios with Tshenuwani Farisani, becoming MEC for Agriculture, Land and Environment until 2004. Thereafter, from 2004 to 2009 under Premier Sello Moloto, he returned to his former office as MEC for Education.

Throughout this period, he was a member of the Provincial Executive Committee of the ANC's Limpopo branch. Indeed, he was viewed as a possible candidate to run against Ramatlhodi for the position of ANC Provincial Chairperson. In December 2007, he graduated from the Provincial Executive Committee at the ANC's 52nd National Conference in Polokwane, where he was elected for the first time to the ANC's National Executive Committee. He received 1,591 votes across roughly 3,600 ballots, making him the 56th-most popular member of the 80 candidates elected.

== Minister of Health: 2009–2019 ==
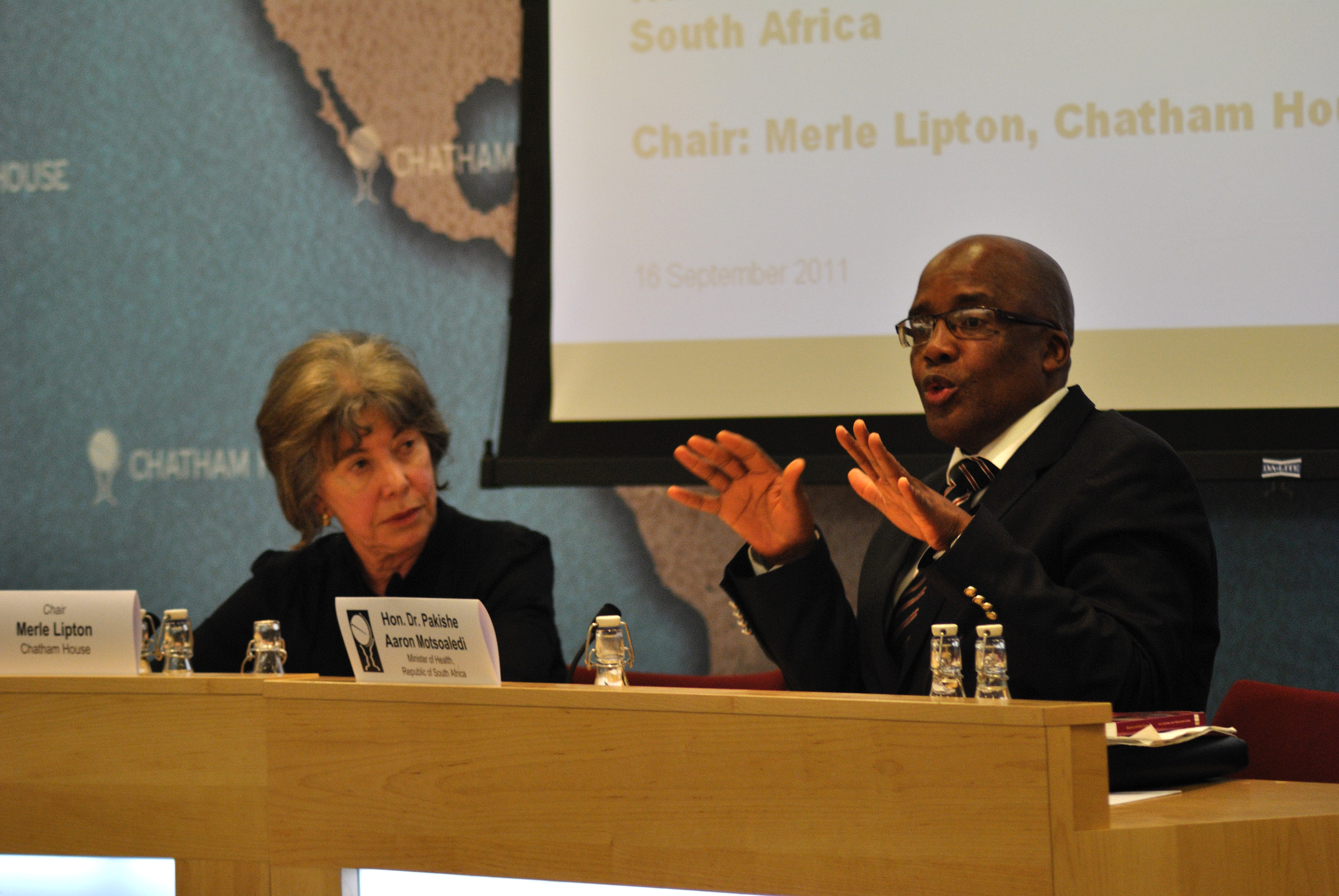
Motsoaledi with Merle Lipton during a panel discussion at Chatham House in September 2011

In the 2009 general election, Motsoaledi did not seek re-election to the Limpopo Provincial Legislature but instead won a seat in the National Assembly, the lower house of the South African Parliament. After the election, he was appointed to succeed Barbara Hogan as Minister of Health in the cabinet of newly elected President Jacob Zuma. His appointment was viewed as surprising, given that he was a relative "unknown" in national politics. However, he went on to hold the office for the next decade.

During his first fortnight in office, Motsoaledi was faced with the threat of a national doctors' strike. In later years, and in addition to regular programmes and new policy initiatives of the Department of Health, he presided over the national government's response to the 2014 Ebola outbreak in West Africa, the 2017 listeriosis outbreak in South Africa, and the Life Esidimeni scandal in Gauteng. He also appointed a ministerial task team to investigate maladministration at the Health Professions Council of South Africa, leading in 2016 to several high-level dismissals.

The Mail & Guardian said that Motsoaledi was "a tour de force internationally", in particular commending him for "raising the international profile" of the campaign against tuberculosis, including during a September 2018 high-level meeting at the United Nations. He was also a member of the UNAIDS–Lancet Commission on Defeating AIDS, which ran from 2013 to 2015, and led one of its working groups with Mark Dybul. In domestic politics, however, towards the end of his tenure, critics accused him of hostility towards non-citizen residents, with a Sunday Times editorial remarking in March 2019 that he had "earned something of a reputation in the foreigner-bashing department".

=== HIV/AIDS policy ===
Many observers, even those who were critical of the broader functioning of the healthcare system during Motsoaledi's tenure, praised him for his impact on HIV/AIDS policy, which they labelled his greatest achievement and legacy. Continuing the work of his predecessor, Motsoaledi set about "undoing the damage" wrought by Thabo Mbeki's health minister, Manto Tshabalala-Msimang, who was frequently accused of HIV/AIDS denialism. By August 2011, the Treatment Action Campaign said of Motsoaledi, "We've seen a massive change since the Manto years – he listens and he understands the challenges we face in HIV/Aids. I’d say he’s one of the best deployments the ANC has ever made".

Motsoaledi's ministry launched a R1.4-billion HIV testing and counselling programme in March 2010, hailed by the South African National Aids Council as the largest programme of its kind "in the history of the Aids pandemic around the world". Other projects included the provision of flavoured, multicoloured condoms at tertiary institutions, which Motsoaledi said would help address "condom fatigue" caused partly by the perception that "the standard-issued choice condoms just aren't cool enough". He was praised by civil rights groups in 2011 for agreeing to be the keynote speaker at a conference on the sexual health of men who have sex with men.

Above all, however, Motsoaledi was commended for expanding access to antiretroviral (ARV) treatment. The number of people on ARVs in South Africa almost doubled between 2008 and 2012, and South Africa's was the largest ARV programme in the world by 2013. The ministry achieved this in part through cost reduction: beginning with a tender renegotiation in 2010, the health ministry and National Treasury together attained the cheapest ARV supply in the world by 2019, along with continued American support through the President's Emergency Plan for Aids Relief. His department announced a switch to a fixed-dose combination ARV, efavirenz/emtricitabine/tenofovir, in 2012, and Motsoaledi launched the new treatment regimen in April 2013 in Ga-Rankuwa. In January 2015, ARV access was expanded to meet World Health Organisation treatment guidelines for the first time, and from September 2016, free ARVs were rolled out to all HIV-positive residents, regardless of their immune status. Also in 2016, South Africa became one of the first countries to roll out an ARV (Truvada) as pre-exposure prophylaxis to HIV-negative sex workers.

Although South Africa faced significant ARV shortages near the end of Motsoaledi's term in 2018, in all, during his tenure, the Department of Health provided ARV access to an addition 4 million people, with the programme expanding from 792,000 patients in 2009 to an estimated 4.7 million in 2019. Between 2008 and 2018, largely owing to improved access to ARVs, annual AIDS-related deaths halved and average life expectancy improved by eight years for women and six years for men.

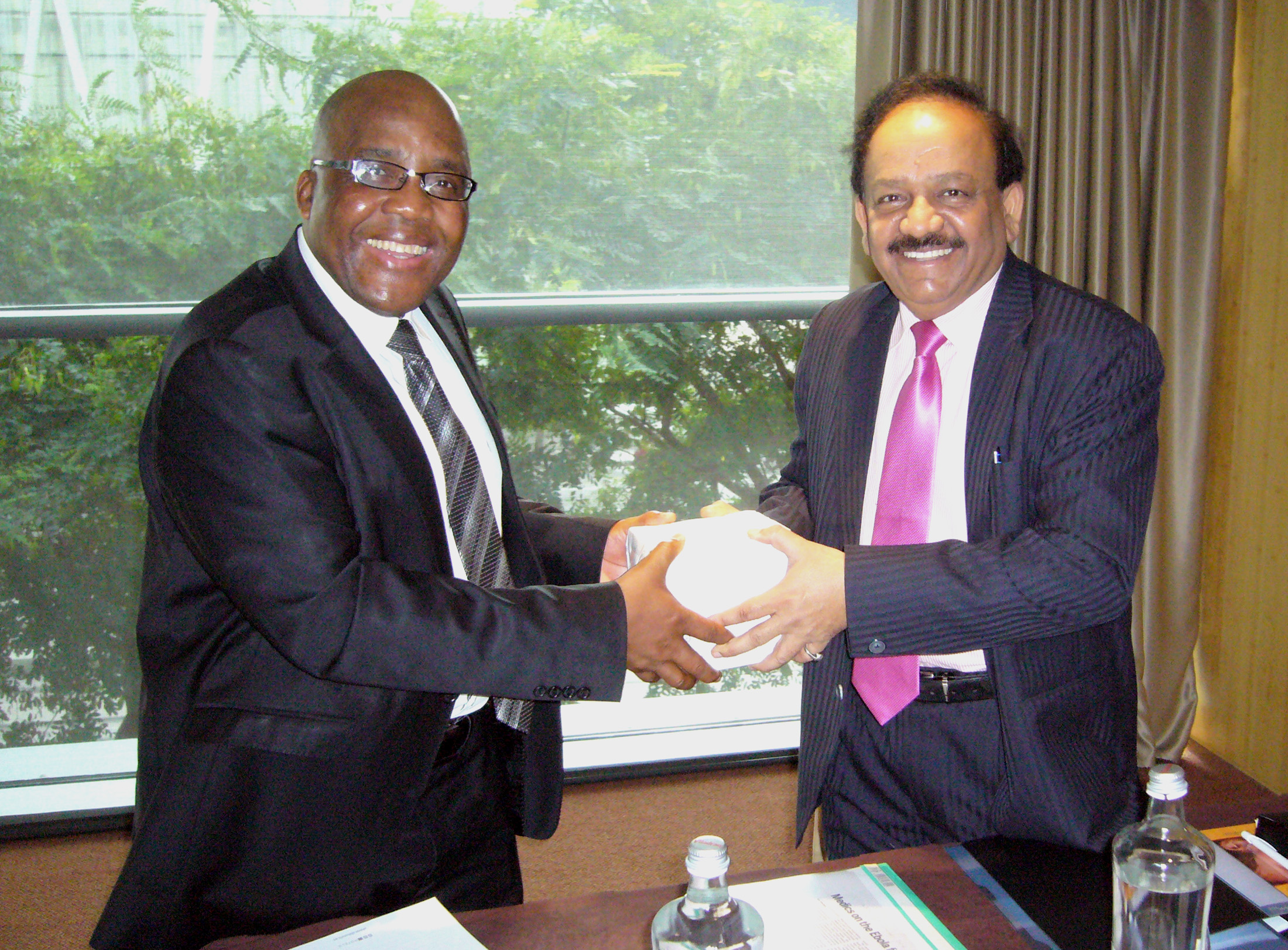
Motsoaledi with Indian health minister Harsh Vardhan in Barcelona, October 2014

=== National Health Insurance ===
Apart from HIV/AIDS, the central policy initiative of Motsoaledi's term was the new National Health Insurance (NHI) proposal, which would aim to provide universal healthcare to all legal residents. He linked the initiative to his critique of the private healthcare sector, which he said was a "brutal system" that had brought about "rampant commercialisation" in healthcare. Upon taking office in 2009, he appointed a 25-member advisory committee on the initiative, culminating in a green paper on NHI which was approved by the cabinet in August 2011 and which suggested a 14-year implementation timeframe. An audit of all health facilities began in the same year, and a pilot programme was rolled out in ten districts on 1 April 2012.

Finally, Motsoaledi introduced the draft Medical Schemes Amendment Bill and NHI Bill in Parliament in June 2018. However, the legislation was not processed before he left the ministry, and the Sunday Times commented in May 2019 that, although Motsoaledi had frequently entered into conflict with the private healthcare sector over the policy, "As the years pass, the NHI has remained a blur, and Motsoaledi has done little to clarify the outlines of this grandiose project."

=== Preventive healthcare ===
In his public appearances, Motsoaledi emphasised the importance of preventive healthcare and therefore of primary healthcare. In early 2012, he warned that his department would "be making a lot of noise" about smoking, alcohol consumption, diet, and exercise, which he said were key factors in South Africa's high burden of non-communicable diseases. He said that he had declared war on trans fatty acids and that not even his cabinet colleagues were exempt from his campaign: according to Motsoaledi, he used "every available opportunity" in cabinet meetings to lecture about healthy diets. The following year, he signed an amendment to the Foodstuffs, Cosmetics and Disinfectants Act of 1976 which instituted limits on the sodium content of several processed foodstuffs, including bread. He also said that he would support bans on electronic cigarettes and on alcohol advertising.

In May 2013, he announced that, in consultation with the Minister of Finance and Minister of Basic Education, his ministry would administer free HPV vaccines to public school children; the programme rolled out to grade-four girls in 2014. In the realm of infant and maternal mortality, his department launched MomConnect in August 2014, and he said that he would support regulation of access to baby formula as a means to improving infant nutrition.

=== ANC leadership ===
Motsoaledi was re-elected to the ANC National Executive Committee in December 2012, ranked 18th of 80 by popularity. He was also appointed as the committee's chief representative in the troubled provincial branch of the Western Cape, and he was elected to a five-year term on the influential 20-member National Working Committee. During the committee's term, he became a critic of President Zuma; he reportedly spoke in favour of both of two motions of no confidence – one in late 2016 and one in mid-2017 – that were tabled against Zuma during the committee's meetings. In November 2016, when opposition parties pursued a no-confidence motion against Zuma in Parliament, Motsoaledi did not arrive to vote in Zuma's favour, thus defying a three-line whip.

Ahead of the ANC's 54th National Conference, held at Nasrec in December 2017, Motsoaledi supported Deputy President Cyril Ramaphosa's successful campaign to succeed Zuma as ANC president. The same conference elected Motsoaledi to a third term on the ANC National Executive Committee; he was ranked 28th of 80 by popularity. He was retained as Minister of Health in Ramaphosa's cabinet when Ramaphosa replaced Zuma as President of South Africa in February 2018.

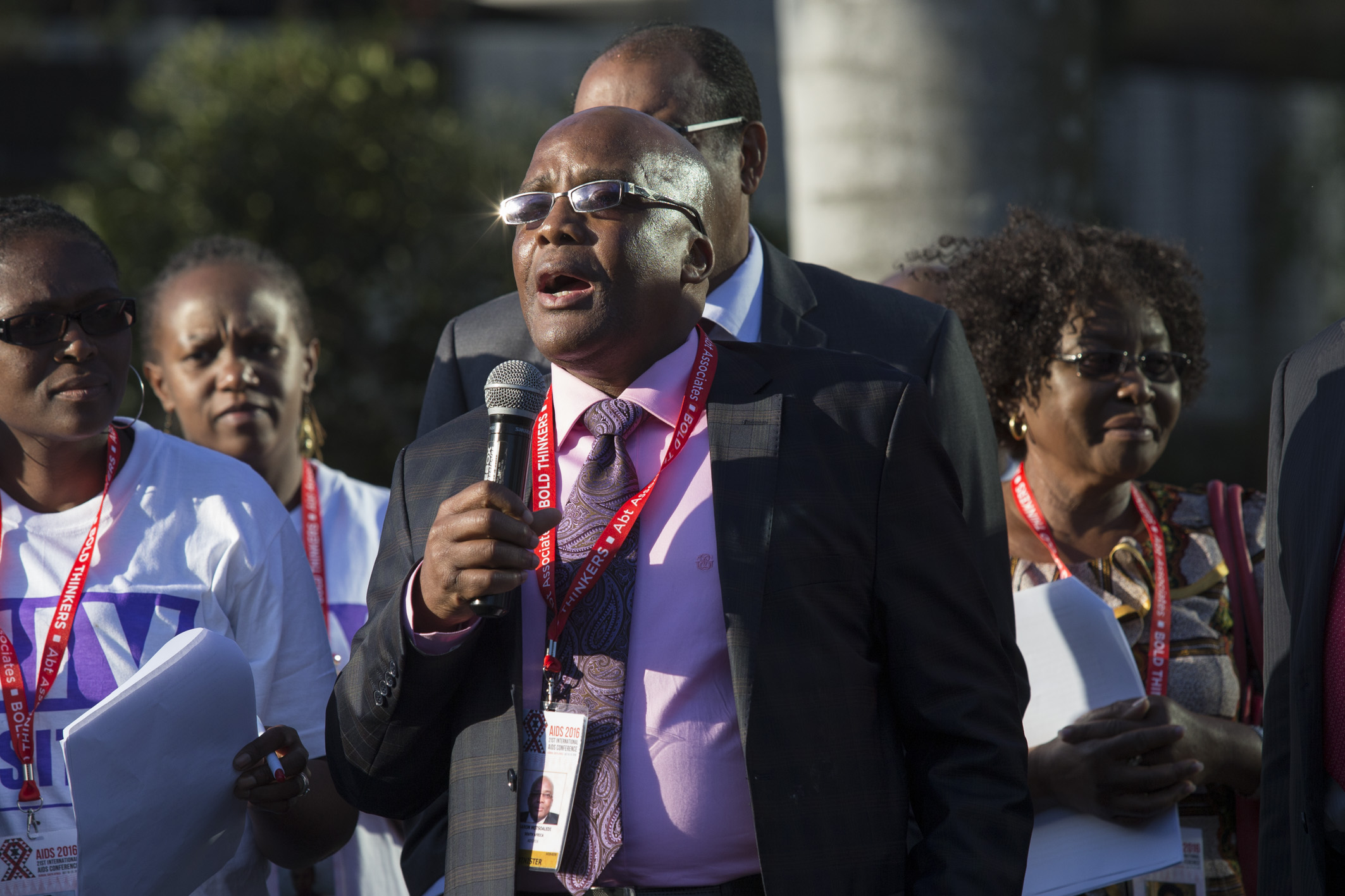
Motsoaledi at a Treatment Action Campaign rally in Durban during the 21st International AIDS Conference, July 2016

=== Bribery allegation ===
In November 2019, Motsoaledi was named as a person of interest in the investigation into the murder of Bloemfontein businessman Louis Siemens. Stanley Bakili, who was standing trial for the murder, claimed in an affidavit that, on Siemens's behalf, he had bribed Motsoaledi and Ace Magashule to expedite the approval of a hospital license for CityMed Hospital. He said that Motsoaledi had received R150,000. Motsoaledi strongly denied the allegation, saying that he had never met or spoken to Bakili. He repeated his denial on the stand when called to testify in the case in the Free State High Court.

== Minister of Home Affairs: 2019–2024 ==
In the 2019 general election, Motsoaledi was re-elected to the National Assembly, ranked 25th on the ANC's national party list. After the election, he was appointed to a new portfolio as Minister of Home Affairs in Ramaphosa's second cabinet. Njabulo Nzuza was appointed as his deputy.

Motsoaledi was a prominent figure in the state's response to the 2022 prison break of Thabo Bester, as well as in the development and passage of the Electoral Amendment Act of 2023, which, on the instruction of the Constitutional Court, introduced electoral reforms to allow independent candidacies. In late 2021, he announced the Department of Home Affairs's highly controversial decision to terminate the Zimbabwean Exemption Permit, which since 2009 had allowed tens of thousands of Zimbabwean refugees to live and work in South Africa. However, at the end of 2022, the Mail & Guardian criticised him for inaction on his plan to effect a "complete overhaul of the immigration system", which he had announced at the beginning of the year. His critics also accused him of fuelling xenophobia in South Africa.

The ANC's 55th National Conference was held in December 2022, and Motsoaledi was re-elected to the National Executive Committee; he received 1,448 votes across roughly 4,000 ballots, making him the 27th-most popular member of the committee. He was appointed as the committee's chief representative in the Eastern Cape and as deputy chairperson of the subcommittee on education, health, science and technology, under chairperson Peggy Nkonyeni.

== Personal life ==
Motsoaledi is married to Thelma Dikeledi, who is a businesswoman. They have two sons and three daughters, one of whom also studied to become a doctor and another of whom owns an Amsterdam-based start-up that gained her entry to the European Forbes 30 Under 30. Two of his siblings are on the medical faculty at Medunsa.

In August 2013, while Motsoaledi was Minister of Health, he was commended by the Economic Freedom Fighters and Democratic Alliance for undergoing surgery at Steve Biko Hospital, a public hospital in Pretoria. He said that he insisted his family attend public school and use public health facilities.
