= Malegapuru Makgoba =

South African immunologist, physician, public health advocate and academic

Malegapuru William Makgoba OMS
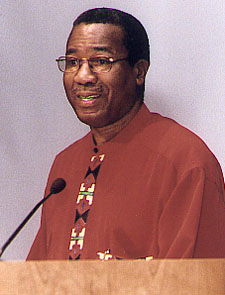
- Makgoba delivering the James C. Hill Memorial Lecture at the NIH Campus in Bethesda in 2001.

Vice-Chancellor of the University of KwaZulu-Natal
- In office 1 January 2004 – 31 December 2014

Personal details
- Born: 1952 (age 73–74) Sekhukhune, Transvaal; Union of South Africa
- Education: University of Natal; University of Oxford
- Website: makgoba.ukzn.ac.za

Malegapuru William Makgoba (born 1952 in Sekhukhune, South Africa) is a leading South African immunologist, physician, public health advocate, academic and former vice-chancellor of the University of KwaZulu-Natal. In 2013 he was recognised as "a pioneer in higher education transformation", by being awarded the Order of Mapungubwe in Silver.

== Academic career ==
Makgoba received an MBChB degree from the University of Natal Medical School in 1976 with merit in medicine. In 1979 he was named the first black Nuffield Dominion Fellow to the University of Oxford, where he completed his DPhil degree in human immunogenetics in 1983 under Professor Sir Andrew McMichael. The title of his thesis was "Studies on the polymorphism of HLA class II antigens".

He went on to become the first senior registrar to fellow expatriate South African and President of Royal College of Physicians of London, Sir Raymond Hoffenberg, in 1983.

He was Reader in Molecular Endocrinology at the Royal Postgraduate Medical School London (1990–94) He was the first black South African to be selected to the prestigious National Institute of Health's Fogarty Visiting Programme in the late 1980s.

Makgoba was appointed the first black deputy vice-chancellor at the University of the Witwatersrand in 1995.

Makgoba left Wits University to join the South African Medical Research Council. He was appointed the first black Chairperson of the MRC Board(1995-1998). He thereafter served as President of the South African Medical Research Council between 1999 and 2002 and was involved in developing South Africa's AIDS strategy and the SA AIDS Vaccine Initiative.

Professor Makgoba joined the former University of Natal as its Vice-Chancellor in 2002, and oversaw its merger with the University of Durban-Westville into the University of KwaZulu-Natal. UKZN is one of the top five research-intensive universities in the country and ranked amongst the top 500 Universities in the World.

During 2007–2008, the university raised 577 million South African rands (about 57 million Euros) in total research funding. Prof. Makgoba has been closely involved with the funding in 2011 of a new 4,000 square metre HIV and tuberculosis research Institute, KwaZulu-Natal Research Institute for TB and HIV (KRITH) at the university's medical school.

== Achievements ==
=== Scientific contributions ===
Working with Drs. Martin Sanders and Stephen Shaw and others at the National Cancer Institute, "were among the first to appreciate the importance of lymphocyte adhesion and these observations have helped shape the evolution of the field as follows:

- appreciation of the importance of antigen-nonspecific adhesion to T cell antigen-specific recognition,
- demonstration that changes in adhesion molecule expression and function are cardinal features of naïve to memory cell differentiation and
- for co-discovering the first two heterophillic direct intercellular molecular adhesion pathways in biology ". He was instrumental in demonstrating the importance of adhesion molecules in T cell function through a series of what are now regarded as classic publications.
- Provided the first evidence that isoforms of the adhesion/ signaling molecule (ICAM-1) circulate in plasma and the circulating levels of isoform patterns might vary with inflammation and in different pathological states.

=== Fellowships and affiliations ===
A former Deputy Vice-Chancellor at the University of Witwatersrand and ad hominem professor of molecular Immunology at the University of Witwatersrand's School of Pathology 1996–98, Professor Makgoba is

- Fellow of the Royal College of Physicians of London 1990;
- Founding Member of the Academy of Science of South Africa;
- Foreign Associate member of the United States National Academy of Sciences' Institute of Medicine 2002;
- Fellow of the College of Physicians of South Africa ad eundem
- Fellow of Imperial College's Faculty of Medicine 2007 in recognition of contributions to "medical research, international public health and university administration".
- Professor Makgoba was appointed as member of the National Planning Commission of the Republic of South Africa
- Professor Makgoba was a member of National Working Group appointed by the late Educational Minister Kadar Asmal in year 2000, that recommended mergers and incorporations in the restructuring of Higher Education system in South Africa.
- In October 2011 he was elected as the new vice-president for Scientific Planning and Review of the prestigious Paris-based International Council for Science (ICSU).
- Chosen as chair of the Ministerial Oversight Committee on Transformation in SA Public Universities

=== Awards ===
- Science-for-Society Gold Medal of the Academy of Science South Africa in 2002
- Gold medal for Outstanding Leadership in Medical Research in 2001, University of the Witwatersrand
- In October 2005, Makgoba received the Golden Jubilee Award of the Colleges of Medicine of South Africa in "recognition of his contribution in the field of Immunology and research, and particularly also in transforming research in South Africa while President of the Medical Research Council and for his role in transformation of Higher Education in South Africa"
- In September 2011 Makgoba received the prestigious National Research Foundation of South Africa's President's Lifetime Achievement Award for his "extraordinary contribution to the development of science".
- Makgoba was the first recipient of the South African-German Science Award in the category of Top Researcher,"for having made outstanding extraordinary contribution(s) of international standard and impact to the development of science, in and for South Africa, over an extended period of time", 2012;
- Makgoba was honoured by President Jacob Zuma with the Order of Mapungubwe (Silver) "for his dedication and excellent contribution to the field of science and medicine, locally and internationally; and for his contribution to the building of democracy in South Africa. He is an outstanding academic and a pioneer of transformation in higher education."
- The eThekwini Living Legends Award was awarded to Professor Malegapuru Makgoba for his critical contribution to the field of medicine. The Awards acknowledge individuals with "outstanding achievements, and those who have demonstrated a sustained and extraordinary contribution in various categories of expertise".
- Makgoba has been awarded the MRC President's Award for Exceptional Contributions to Medical Research. The Award was made in recognition of his exceptional contributions to medical research and is among the highest honours bestowed by the MRC.

=== Services to committees and boards ===
- Chairperson of the Medical Research Council of South Africa, 1994–98; (reappointed)
- First Secretary-General of the Academy of Science of South Africa, 1996–98;
- Chairperson of the National Science and Technology Forum, 1995–99;
- Member of the National Advisory Council on Innovation (NACI), 1998-2001(reappointed);
- Member of the Council of Higher Education(CHE), 1998–2000;
- Member of the Council on Higher Education's Quality Control Council, 1999–2000;
- Member of the Presidential Advisory Panel on HIV/AIDS, 2000;
- Member of the founding Board of Directors of the International AIDS Vaccine Initiative, 1999–2001;
- Member of the UNAIDS/WHO Vaccine Committee and UNAIDS/WHO HIV/AIDS Prevention Group, 1999–2001;
- Chairperson of the Board of Directors of the Mail and Guardian 2002 to March 2011;
- Member of the National Advisory Council on Innovation (1998-2000), reappointed 2002;
- Member of the Board of Directors of the International AIDS Vaccine Initiative, 1999–2004;
- Founder member and founding Chairperson of the UNAIDS/WHO African Aids Vaccine Programme (AAVP), 2000–04;
- Member of the Board of Directors of the Global Alliance for TB Drug Development (GATBD) 2000–04;
- Member of the National Working Group appointed by Prof. Kader Asmal;
- Chairperson of the Health Sciences Review Committee, since 2010-;
- Member of the National Planning Commission since May 2010;
- Chairperson of the Transformation Oversight Committee for Public Universities 2013.
- Chairperson of a 10-member Medical Task Team established to investigate "factors affecting the optimal functioning of the three military hospitals in South Africa" - 2014

== Transformation-related debates and controversies ==
=== Clashes with "inbred elite" at the University of the Witwatersrand ===
Shortly after his appointment as deputy vice chancellor of Wits, Makgoba announced to The Times Higher Education Supplement that it was his intention to replace the university's "dominant eurocentrism", and called the university leadership a "small inbred elite" In response, 13 senior staff compiled a dossier contradicting claims made in his curriculum vitae. Makgoba responded with his own accusations, based on the personal files of the 13, of tax evasion, inconsistent salary scales, nepotism, lack of qualifications and misrepresentation of credentials. Makgoba was temporarily suspended by the university for abusing his position to access the academics' personal files.

Journalist and biographer Mark Gevisser commented that "No intellectual debate defines our times more than that which racked the University of Witwatersrand in 1995" Mahmood Mamdani stated that "Makogba was a victim of the 'racialised power' entrenched at Wits".

In 1997, Makgoba published a book about his experiences at Wits, entitled Mokoko – The Makgoba Affair. In it, he affirmed his commitment to the idea of an African Renaissance and to "transforming the higher education landscape". Guy Martin, professor at the School of Government of the University of the Western Cape, referred to the book as "a personal account of the recent process of transformation occurring at Wits." Martin noted that, while Makgoba was "justifiably proud of his considerable achievements as an African scientist", the force with which he defends his credentials in the book "leads him to sound intellectually pompous and arrogant and utterly self-centered, if not downright egocentric". Martin also questioned Makgoba's "resort to some unorthodox--and, possibly, unethical--methods of struggle", and noted his own "uneasiness in attempting to disentangle objective reality from opinion, and fact from fiction" while reading the book. Deputy President at the time, Thabo Mbeki, wrote: "The publication of this book demonstrates that it is possible to succeed in the struggle for change, despite the continuing exercise of power by powerful forces which owe their dominance to the very antithesis of "liberalism", however defined."

=== White males as "baboons and bonobos" ===
In 2005, The Mail and Guardian newspaper published an opinion piece by Professor Makgoba entitled "The wrath of the dethroned white male" which compared the behaviour of white South African males in post-Apartheid South Africa to "baboons or bonobos" who had lost their alpha status, and were in need of "treatment and proper African rehabilitation". This article was debated heavily in the press, and provoked a response the following week from Robert Morrell, a professor in the Faculty of Education at UKZN under Makgoba. In that article, Morrell argued that Makgoba's article could rightfully be interpreted as "bullying managerial practice". Later that year, Morrell brought a defamation case against Makgoba, primarily citing claims made about Morrell in an email sent out to staff. Morrell dropped the case three years later, following the death of his wife, and citing concern for his "own health and well-being".

=== Accusations of stifling academic freedom at UKZN ===
The Committee for Academic Freedom in Africa issued a statement in 2006 in protest against alleged infractions of academic freedom at the University of KwaZulu-Natal under Makgoba.

This partly arose from his treatment of critics, particularly those involved with the shack dwellers' movement Abahlali baseMjondolo, of his ordering the eviction of shack dwellers living on the campus. Later that year he brought disciplinary action against one of the critics, UKZN academic Fazel Khan, for "bringing the university into disrepute", after Khan had answered questions put to him by the media after he was airbrushed out of a picture and removed from the text of an article on a film he had made that was printed in the University newsletter. Later that year The Mercury newspaper reported that Makgoba had threatened to, at the request of the mayor of Durban, bring evidence from the National Intelligence Agency to the council and to charge academics who had been working with the shack dweller's movement Abahlali baseMjondolo with "incitement".

Staff were also banned from speaking to the media during a two-week strike in February 2006. Strikers wore T-shirts that read: "We Demand Academic Freedom".

In 2007, the university senate invited faculties to make submissions on academic freedom. Preparation of the faculty of science and agriculture's submission was led by Professors Nithaya Chetty and John Van den Berg, who spoke to the press in April 2008 after Makgoba, as chairperson of the senate, blocked the submission several times, claiming that it was "self-serving and contributed nothing to the debate." Van den Berg and Chetty also voiced their frustrations that the submissions were to be investigated only by a one-man subcommittee of the senate, consisting of former education minister Sibusiso Bengu, rather than being discussed in senate itself. Makgoba, as chair of the senate, blocked discussions of academic freedom. When Van den Berg criticised this, Makgoba accused him racism, cowardice, insubordination and lack of academic productivity. Van den Berg voiced his frustrations in the press, and sent a letter to Makgoba which he also read out at a senate meeting.

In response, in August 2008, the university brought disciplinary action against the two professors for having spoken to the press, in part for their criticism of Makgoba. They were charged with breaches of confidentiality, dishonesty and "gross negligence", and threatened with dismissal. Although the matter had initially been resolved by mediation, this was rejected by university lawyers, who instead required that Chetty and Van den Berg sign admission of guilt forms, which they refused to do. Prof Alan Rycroft, representing the two professors, said of the matter, "As a labour lawyer, I have to question what kind of advice the legal team is giving to the vice-chancellor. If there has been misconduct, workplace discipline is meant to be corrective, not punitive."

Professor Van den Berg reached an agreement with the university's lawyers. The terms included that the agreement would stand before the university council, that Van den Berg would express his regret and apologise unreservedly to the university, council, senate and to Makgoba for any harm that he may have caused, "reputationally or otherwise" and accept that senate had resolved that Makgoba was entitled to remove "academic freedom" from the senate agenda. The university agreed that Van den Berg had not been grossly negligent in claiming to the press that Makgoba had no right to do so. Van den Berg was also issued a final written warning and agreed never to make "disparaging remarks" about Makgoba in the media. Professor Chetty resigned, citing concern for himself and his loved ones. A representative of the Freedom of Expression Institute, said of the resignation, "I think he was forced into a position where he felt he had to resign. The disciplinary process, with such expensive legal counsel, was set up so that the professors would lose."

The disciplinary proceedings were condemned by several prominent national organisations, including the South African National Editors Forum, the Congress of South African Trade Unions, the Freedom of Expression Institute and the SA Mathematical Society. South African Education minister at the time, Naledi Pandor raised concern over the "persistent negative publicity" the situation had generated.

A Council Committee on Governance and Academic Freedom (GAFC) including former Public Protector Advocate Selby Baqwa was set up internally by the University. In 2009 it found that, although there were problems dealing with academics who spoke to the media and with the manner of conduct of disciplinary hearings, Makgoba and the university had not threatened academic freedom. This was in spite of "two years of repeated criticism, both locally and abroad, of its commitment to academic freedom.".

In 2012, Makgoba, Karim and Coovadia stated in an advertorial published by the Sunday Times that UKZN had "followed a protracted legal struggle mounted to protect its scientific autonomy against official impediments to legitimate AIDS research"

== Public stance against AIDS denialism ==
During the late 1990s and early 2000s, President Thabo Mbeki invited several HIV/AIDS denialists to join his Presidential AIDS Advisory Panel, resulting in government policies that have since been estimated to have led to the early deaths of more than 330,000 South Africans living with AIDS. At the time, Makgoba as President of the Medical Research Council took a leading role in the fight against AIDS denialism and the right for the freedom of scientific inquiry and was signatory and co-editor of the "Durban Declaration on HIV and AIDS" in July 2000.

== False allegations of sexual harassment ==
Makgoba, along with the council chairman, stepped aside from their positions on 28 November 2006, after a scandal emerged involving claims of sexual harassment and victimisation levelled by the dean of the Faculty of Management Studies, Pumela Msweli-Mbanga. Judge Magid chaired the enquiry into the sexual harassment allegations. Makgoba denied these claims and relinquished his post pending the outcome of an enquiry. Makgoba was subsequently found not guilty and resumed his position as Vice-Chancellor. Msweli-Mbanga filed the sexual harassment charges in response to initial investigations into the awarding of the degree.
