= Education in South Africa =

Department of Basic Education Department of Higher Education and Training
- Minister of Basic Education Minister of Higher Education, Science and Technology: Siviwe Gwarube; Buti Manamela

National education budget (2022)
- Budget: R407.3 billion

General details
- Primary languages: South African Languages English
- System type: Public, Private

Literacy (2025)
- Total: 95%

Enrollment
- Total: n/a
- Primary: n/a on stats SA
- Secondary: n/a on stats SA
- Post secondary: n/a on stats SA

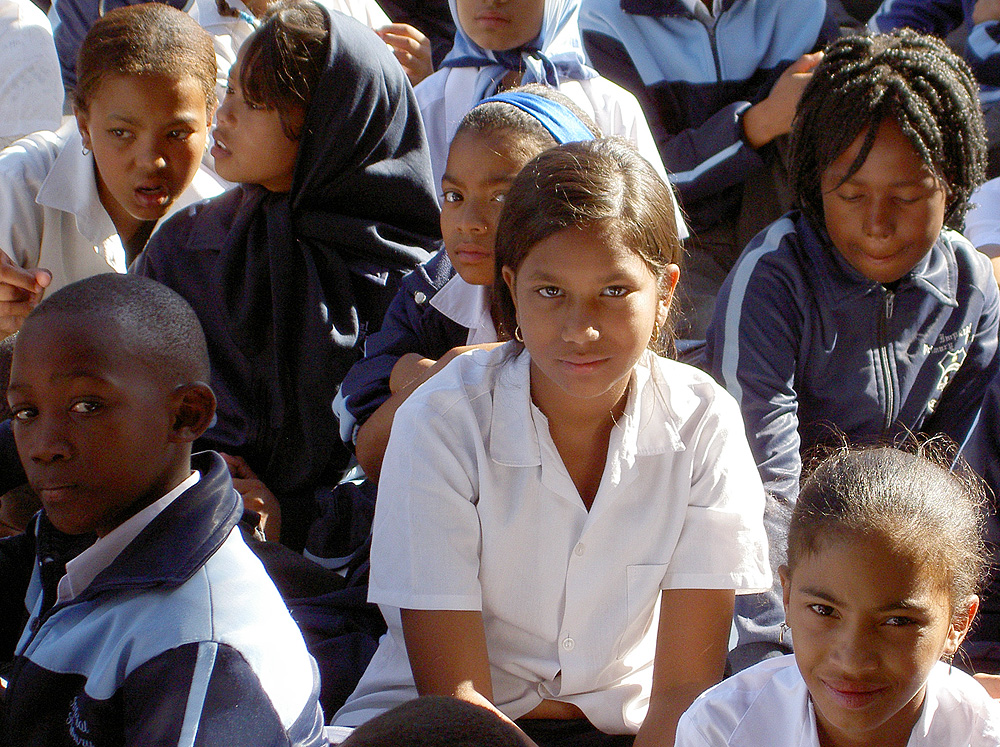
School children in Cape Town

Education in South Africa is governed by two national departments, namely the Department of Basic Education (DBE), which is responsible for primary and secondary schools, and the Department of Higher Education and Training (DHET), which is responsible for tertiary education and vocational training. Prior to 2009, both departments were represented in a single Department of Education.

In 2025, the South African literacy rate was 95%, and the second-highest on the African continent (after Seychelles).

The DBE deals with public schools, private schools (also referred to by the department as independent schools), early childhood development (ECD) centres, and special needs schools. The public schools and private schools are collectively known as ordinary schools, which are roughly 97% of schools in South Africa. Unlike in most countries, many public schools charge tuition (referred to as fees). No-fee schools were introduced on a limited basis in 2007.

The DHET deals with further education and training (FET) colleges now known as Technical and Vocational Education and Training (TVET) colleges, adult basic education and training (ABET) centres, and higher education (HE) institutions.

The nine provinces of South Africa also have their own education departments that are responsible for implementing the policies of the national department and dealing with local issues.

In 2010, the basic education system comprised 12,644,208 learners, 30,586 schools, and 439,394 teachers. In 2009, the higher education and training system comprised 837,779 students in HE institutions, 420,475 students in state-controlled FET institutions and 297,900 in state-controlled ABET centres.

In 2013, the South African government spent 21% of the national budget on education. Some 10% of the education budget is for higher education.

The Human Rights Measurement Initiative (HRMI) finds that South Africa is fulfilling only 57.1% of what it should be fulfilling for the right to education based on the country's level of income. HRMI breaks down the right to education by looking at the rights to both primary education and secondary education. While taking into consideration South Africa's income level, the nation is achieving 70.8% of what should be possible based on its resources (income) for primary education and 80.9% for secondary education, but 19.6% in general for education quality.

- South African Schools Act of 1996 facilitates access to education, promotes quality and democratic governance in the schooling system, and ensures that all learners have access to quality education without discrimination.
- National Education Policy Act of 1996 inscribes law into policies, legislative and monitoring responsibilities of the Minister of Basic Education, including the formal relationship between national and provincial authorities.
- Employment of Educators Act of 1998 regulates the professional, moral, and ethical responsibilities of educators and competency requirements for teachers.

== Basic education system (primary and secondary schools) ==
Basic education in South Africa takes place at primary and secondary levels from Grade 1 (6–7-year-olds) to Grade 12 (18–21-year-olds). Students who succeed in Grade 12 graduate with a matriculation certificate, which enables them to transition to tertiary level education.

The DBE officially groups grades into two "bands" called General Education and Training (GET), which includes Grade R (South Africa's equivalent of Kindergarten) plus Grades 1 to 9, and Further Education and Training (FET), which includes Grades 10 to 12 as well as non-higher education vocational training facilities.

The GET band is subdivided further into "phases" called the Foundation Phase (Grades R to 3), the Intermediate Phase (Grades 4 to 6), and the Senior Phase (Grades 7 to 9). On an international level, the Foundation and Intermediate phases correspond to elementary education, while the Senior Phase corresponds to lower secondary education.

The administrative structure of most ordinary schools in South Africa does not reflect the division of bands and phases, however. For historical reasons, most schools are either "primary" schools (grade R plus grades 1 to 7) or "secondary" schools, also known as high schools (grades 8 to 12).

Primary and secondary educational levels
Ages	Grade Level
Foundation Phase
5–6	Grade R
6–7	Grade 1
7–8	Grade 2
8–9	Grade 3
Intermediate Phase
9–10	Grade 4
10–11	Grade 5
11–12	Grade 6
Senior Phase (Lower secondary)
12–13	Grade 7
13–14	Grade 8
14–15	Grade 9
Further Education and Training Phase (Upper Secondary)
15–16	Grade 10
16–17	Grade 11
17–18	Grade 12

=== Optional grades ===
Some home schools and private schools offer the option to complete an additional year after grade 12, sometimes known as "post-matric", it forms part of non-South African curriculums that are sometimes followed by private schools in South Africa.

The DBE's Foundation Phase includes a pre-school grade known as grade R, for "reception". Grade R is compulsory, but not all primary schools offer grade R. Grade R may also be attended at pre-school facilities. Other grades that can be completed at a pre-school centre include grade 00 and grade 000 (although the 000 and 00 designations are not universally applied). Grade R is sometimes called Grade 0 (pronounced "grade nought"), particularly in previously white schools, where the usage was once common.

=== Learner ratios ===
According to the DBE's 2010 statistics report (published in 2012), there are, on average, 30 learners per teacher, 480 learners per school, and 16 teachers per school. The ratio of learners per teacher is roughly the same in all provinces, but the ratio of learners per school varies by province. For example, in Gauteng, there are 800 learners per school and 28 teachers per school, whereas in the Eastern Cape, there are 350 learners per school and 12 teachers per school.

Updated 2013 statistics (published in 2015) are available.

=== School income and expenses ===
Schools in South Africa receive a grant from government for their operational costs, such as maintaining the grounds, administrative costs, salaries, books and educational materials, and extramural activities. Most schools supplement the government grant with other streams of income, such as school fees paid by parents, fundraising events, and receiving donations. Generally, higher school fees prevent poorer children from attending affluent schools. There is no limit to the amount of the fees that a school may set. Parents may apply to the school for full or partial reduction of school fees. Many affluent schools provide financial assistance to a small number of learners (for example, if the parents are alumni), but it is not a legal requirement.

Children at South African schools are usually required to purchase and wear school uniforms although it is often possible to buy them second-hand. Most schools offer extramural activities such as a variety of sports and cultural activities, which require money to maintain. Many schools maintain their own sports fields as well.

The size of the grant paid by government is determined largely by the poverty level of the neighbourhood in which the school is situated, as well as unemployment rate and the general education rate of the population in that neighbourhood. Consequently, schools in more affluent areas must raise more money from other sources to maintain the same standard of education, but schools from affluent areas often have so much additional income that their standard of education is much higher than that of less affluent schools anyway.

The size of the government grant per child depends on the "quintille" of the school. In 2009, schools in quintile 1 (the poorest) and quintile 2 received R807 and R740 per child per year, respectively, while schools in quintile 4 and quintile 5 (the richest) received R404 and R134 per child per year. Schools in quintile 1-3 may apply for classification as a "No Fee" school; 5% of all schools are quintille 5 schools, and 15% of all schools are quintille 4 schools.

==== Sample school fees ====
Schools are not required to publish their school fees publicly, and many schools are secretive about it, but here are some examples of school fees in non-private schools in South Africa:

- The Settler's High, Bellville: R15,200 per child per year
- Monument Park High, Kraaifontein: R9,000 per child per year
- Middelburg hoërskool, Middelburg: R25,000 per child per year

==== Poverty and school fees ====
Schools may not refuse admission to children who live in the immediate vicinity of the school. Schools may not refuse entry to children or refuse to hand over report cards even if their parents neglect to pay the school fees, but schools are permitted to sue parents for nonpayment of school fees.

Since 1996, children whose parents are very poor are legally exempt from some or all school fees. Since 1998, the formula is as follows. If the combined annual income of the parents is less than ten times the annual school fee, the child is legally exempt. If the income is more than ten times the school fee but less than thirty times the school fee, the child is legally entitled to a specific reduction in school fees. In practice, those regulations help only very poor families, not working-class and middle-income families.

Orphans and children of parents who receive poverty-linked social grants are also exempt from paying school fees.

Since 2006, the Education Department offers the following incentive to the poorest 40% of schools. If the school charges no school fees, the education department increases the grant to make up for the lack of income from school fees. It was originally planned to increase this incentive to the poorest 60% of schools by 2009. The incentive applies only to children in the GED band, and children who wish to complete grade 10-12 must still pay the full fee.

In 2008, some 5 million learners in 14,264 schools benefited from the No Fee school program, and most of them were in the Eastern Cape, KwaZulu-Natal and Limpopo Provinces. Not all schools that qualify for the incentive make use of it.

=== Private schools ===
Private schools, also known as independent schools, are schools that are not owned by the state. They are usually owned and operated by a trust, church or community, or by a for-profit company. Not all private schools in South Africa charge high school fees. Certain private schools also receive a grant from the state, depending on the community served and fees charged.

=== Online schools ===
Online schooling in South Africa existed prior to the COVID-19 pandemic, primarily as an option for learners seeking flexible education or for home-educated students. These schools typically deliver curricula through digital platforms, allowing students to study remotely while remaining within the national education framework. The COVID-19 pandemic significantly increased the demand for online schooling, as temporary school closures and remote learning measures prompted many families to adopt online education. This growth highlighted the role of digital platforms in maintaining curriculum continuity and providing flexible learning options during disruptions to in-person education. While online schools operate within existing legislation for independent or home education, the expansion of online learning has also prompted discussions about quality assurance, access to technology, and equitable opportunities for all learners. While online schooling and homeschooling are sometimes used interchangeably, they differ in structure and delivery. Homeschooling typically places primary responsibility for instruction and learning oversight with parents or guardians, who may select curricula or use umbrella providers. Online schools, by contrast, generally offer structured digital platforms with pre-designed curricula, scheduled instruction, and varying levels of teacher involvement, allowing learners to study remotely without direct day-to-day parental instruction. Some platforms, such as CambriLearn or Connections Academy, operate internationally and illustrate how online schooling can function as a distinct model alongside traditional homeschooling within the broader landscape of alternative education. Considerations specific to online schooling include accreditation, curriculum alignment, and regulatory oversight. In South Africa, online schools offering national qualifications are generally required to align with the Curriculum and Assessment Policy Statement (CAPS) and to be registered with provincial education departments, while assessment and certification fall under the oversight of quality assurance bodies such as Umalusi for school-level qualifications. Online schools offering international curricula may instead seek accreditation from foreign examination boards or international accrediting agencies, which can affect the recognition of qualifications within South Africa.

Additional considerations include access to reliable internet connectivity, the availability of digital devices, and the capacity of families to support learners in a home-based environment. Policy discussions have also addressed the need for consistent standards, learner support mechanisms, and equitable access as online schooling continues to expand alongside traditional and home-based education models.

== Higher education and training system ==
A graph mapping out the National Qualification Frameworks (NQF) and how they relate to different educational options within the South African educational system in 2017. NQFs are a key component of the South African higher education system.

For university entrance, a "Matriculation Endorsement" is required, although some universities do set their own additional academic requirements. South Africa has a vibrant higher education sector, with more than a million students enrolled in the country's universities, colleges and universities of technology. All the universities are autonomous, reporting to their own councils rather than government. The National Qualifications Framework (NQF) system of administering higher education broadly in the country is run by the South African Qualifications Authority.

Graduate unemployment and underemployment are continuing problems, since most students continue to enroll for the humanities, arts, and social sciences. Too few students are choosing to study high-demand subjects such as education, health care, business, STEM subjects, and the skilled trades.

The Extension of Universities Act of 1959 made provision for separate universities for separate races. In addition, the independent homelands were given universities of their own. After the re-incorporation of the independent homelands, there were 36 universities and technikons in South Africa, often in close proximity and offering the same courses.

In 1994, the government embarked on a restructure of the universities and technikons by a series of mergers and incorporations. This was completed by January 2005. It created 22 new institutions from the previous 36. Ten of the universities got new names.

== History ==
=== 1652 to 1900 ===
The earliest European schools in South Africa were established in the Dutch Cape Colony in the late seventeenth century by Dutch Reformed Church elders committed to biblical instruction, which was necessary for church confirmation. In rural areas, itinerant teachers (meesters) taught basic literacy and math skills. British mission schools proliferated after 1799, when the first members of the London Missionary Society arrived in the Cape Colony.

Language soon became a sensitive issue in education. At least two dozen English-language schools operated in rural areas of the British Cape Colony by 1827, but their presence rankled among some members of the Dutch-speaking community, who considered the English language and curriculum irrelevant to rural life and their values. Throughout the nineteenth century, Dutch farmers resisted government policies aimed at the spread of the English language and British values, and many educated their children at home or in the churches.

After British colonial officials began encouraging families to emigrate from Britain to the Cape Colony in 1820, the Colonial Office screened applicants for immigration for background qualifications. They selected educated families, for the most part, to establish a British presence in the Cape Colony. After their arrival, these parents placed a high priority on education. Throughout this time, most religious schools in the Eastern Cape accepted Xhosa children who applied for admission; in Natal many other Nguni-speaking groups sent their children to mission schools after the mid-nineteenth century. The government also financed teacher training classes for Africans as part of its pacification campaign throughout the nineteenth century.

By 1877 some 60 percent of white school-age children in Natal were enrolled in school, as were 49 percent in the Cape Colony. After the Boer War (ended 1902) in the former Afrikaner republics, however, enrolments remained low—only 12 percent in the Orange Free State and 8 percent in the Transvaal—primarily the result of Afrikaner resistance to British education. Enrolments in these republics increased after the government of the Union agreed to the use of Afrikaans in the schools and to allow Afrikaner parents greater control over primary and secondary education.

By the late nineteenth century, three types of schools were receiving government assistance—ward schools, or small rural schools generally employing one teacher; district schools, providing primary-level education to several towns in an area; and a few secondary schools in larger cities. But during the last decades of that century, all four provinces virtually abolished African enrolment in government schools. African children attended mission schools, for the most part, and were taught by clergy or by lay teachers, sometimes with government assistance.

Higher education was generally reserved for those who could travel to Europe, but in 1829 the government established the multiracial South African College, which later split into the University of Cape Town and the South African College Schools . Religious seminaries accepted a few African applicants as early as 1841. In 1852 the independent South African Republic and in 1854 the Orange Free State established their own institutions of higher learning in Dutch. The government established Grey College—later the University of the Orange Free State—in Bloemfontein in 1855 and placed it under the supervision of the Dutch Reformed Church. The Grey Institute was established in Port Elizabeth in 1856; Graaff-Reinet College was founded in 1860. The Christian College was founded at Potchefstroom in 1869 and was later incorporated into the University of South Africa and renamed Potchefstroom University for Christian Higher Education.

=== 1900 to 1948 ===
Following the British victory in the South African War, the British High Commissioner for Southern Africa, Sir Alfred Milner, brought thousands of teachers from across the British Empire to instil the English language and British cultural values, especially in the two former Boer Republics. To counter the British influence, a group of Afrikaner churches proposed an education program, Christian National Education, to serve as the core of the school curriculum. The government initially refused to fund schools adopting this program, but Jan C. Smuts, the Transvaal leader who later became Prime Minister, was strongly committed to reconciliation between Afrikaners and English speakers; he favoured local control over many aspects of education. Provincial autonomy in education was strengthened in the early twentieth century, and all four provincial governments used government funds primarily to educate whites.

The National Party (NP) was able to capitalise on the fear of racial integration in the schools to build its support. The NP's narrow election victory in 1948 gave Afrikaans new standing in the schools and, after that, all high-school graduates were required to be proficient in Afrikaans and English. The NP government also reintroduced Christian National Education as the guiding philosophy of education.

=== 1948 to 1974 ===
Before 1953, many black people attended schools set up by religious organizations. These schools provided schooling of the same quality that white children received in state schools. This changed after the Eiselen Commission recommended establishing a separate education system for blacks under the Ministry of Native Affairs. Minister of Native Affairs and future Prime Minister Hendrik Verwoerd designed Bantu education to teach African culture and educate Africans "in accordance with their opportunities in life." Following the Bantu Education Act (No. 47) of 1953 the government tightened its control over religious high schools by eliminating almost all financial aid, forcing many churches to sell their schools to the government or close them entirely.

The South African government implemented an education system called Christian National Education (CNE). The basis of this system is that a person's social responsibilities and political opportunities are defined by that person's ethnic identity.

Although CNE advanced principles of racial inferiority, it promoted teaching of cultural diversity and enforced mother-tongue instruction in the first years of primary school. The government gave strong management control to the school boards, who were elected by the parents in each district.

In 1959, the Extension of University Education Act prohibited established universities from accepting most black students, although the government did create universities for black, coloured, and Indian students.

The number of schools for blacks increased during the 1960s, but their curriculum was designed to prepare children for menial jobs. Per capita government spending on black education slipped to one-tenth of spending on whites in the 1970s. Black schools had inferior facilities, teachers, and textbooks.

=== 1974 to 1983 ===
In 1974, the Minister of Bantu Education and Development issued a decree commonly known as the "Afrikaans medium decree" in which the use of both English and Afrikaans was made compulsory in black secondary schools. In this decree, physical science and practical subjects would be taught in English, mathematics and social science subjects would be taught in Afrikaans, and music and cultural subjects would be taught in the learner's native language. The Minister said that the reason for this decree was to ensure that black people can communicate effectively with English and Afrikaans speaking white people.

This decree was unpopular with learners and teachers alike, particularly in towns like the Johannesburg township of Soweto, where practically no one spoke Afrikaans. Tensions over language in education erupted into violence on 16 June 1976, when students took to the streets in Soweto and eventually in other towns and cities in the country. This is known as the Soweto Uprising, when students and those able to take a stand demanded to be taught in their mother tongue. Many were killed and injured that day due to police intervention. They are remembered as martyrs. Schools were vandalized and teachers left unable to teach and students were unable to come to school.

=== 1984 to 1990 ===
The National Policy for General Affairs Act (No. 76) of 1984 provided some improvements in black education but maintained the overall separation called for by the Bantu education system.

The Department of Education and Training was responsible for black education outside the bantustans. Each of the three houses of the Tricameral Parliament—for whites, coloureds, and Indians—had an education department for one racial group. Each of the ten homelands had its own education department. In addition, several other government departments managed specific aspects of education.

Education was compulsory for all racial groups, but at different ages, and the law was enforced differently. Whites were required to attend school between the ages of seven and sixteen. Black children were required to attend school from age seven until the equivalent of seventh grade or the age of sixteen. This law was enforced only weakly and not at all in areas where schools were unavailable. For Asians and coloured children, education was compulsory between the ages of seven and fifteen.

Teacher-pupil ratios in primary schools averaged 1:18 in white schools, 1:24 in Asian schools, 1:27 in coloured schools, and 1:39 in black schools. Moreover, whereas 96 percent of all teachers in white schools had teaching certificates, only 15 percent of teachers in black schools were certified. Secondary-school pass rates for black pupils in the nationwide, standardised high-school graduation exams were less than one-half the pass rate for whites.

=== 1990 to 1993 ===
The white education system was restructured, in anticipation of democracy, by the apartheid government. From the beginning of 1991, white schools were required to select one of four "Models": A, B, C, or D. "Model C" was a semi-private structure, with decreased funding from the state, and greatly increased autonomy for schools. Although most white schools opted for the status quo, by 1993, due to government policy, 96% of white public schools became "Model C" schools.

Although the form of "Model C" was abolished by the post-apartheid government, the term is still commonly used to describe former whites-only government schools, as of 2013.

=== 1994 to 2022 ===
Under apartheid South Africa, there were eight education departments that followed different curricula and offered different standards of learning quality. This included nationwide departments for coloured people, for Indians and for black people, a department for independent schools, and provincial departments for white people in each of the former four provinces. Some of the Bantustans that were incorporated back into South Africa in 1994 also had their own education departments.

In terms of the Interim Constitution, the Mandela government restructured these departments as well as tertiary education departments, splitting responsibilities between nine newly formed provincial education departments and a single national education department. It also set about reforming the educational system by first removing all racially offensive and outdated content and then introducing continuous assessment into schools.

The South African Schools Act, 1996 was promulgated to "provide for a uniform system for the organisation, governance and funding of schools".

=== 1997 to 2005 ===
In 1997, the government launched its new education system called Curriculum 2005, which would be based on "outcomes based education" (OBE). By 2006 it was clear that OBE as a social experiment had failed, and it was quietly shelved.

In 2005, the concept of Outcomes-Based Education (OBE) Curriculum identified the new national curriculum framework introduced in grade 1 in 1998, which was progressively included in subsequent grades of basic education. Outcome Based Education regards learning in South Africa as an interactive process between educators and learners, with the learner at the centre and the educator serving as a facilitator.

=== 2006 until now ===
South Africa has 12 official languages, and the first year of schooling is provided in all these home languages.

Before 2009, schools serving non-English speakers had to teach English as a subject only from grade 3 and all subjects were taught in English from grade 4 (except in Afrikaans language schools). Since 2009, all schools teach English as a subject from grade 1 and all subjects are taught in English from grade 4. Afrikaans language schools are an exception, in that all subjects (other than other languages) are taught in Afrikaans.

In December 2019 the Eastern Cape Division of the High Court of South Africa ruled against the ban of children without birth certificates from receiving basic education in South Africa. The court ruled that "It is an important socioeconomic right directed, among other things, at promoting and developing a child's personality, talents and mental and physical abilities to his or her fullest potential" and that "Basic education also provides a foundation for a child's lifetime learning and work opportunities."

== Educational Technology Use ==
=== Information and communication technology (ICT) use in South African education prior to COVID ===
ICTs can be defined as a shorthand for the computers, software, networks, satellite links, and related systems that allow people to access, analyze, create, exchange, and use data, information, and knowledge in ways that were almost imaginable. As with many countries, South Africa has worked to include information and communication technology (ICT) within the education system. However, since South Africa is a developing nation, barriers to educational technology adoption and implementation exist, including lack of resources such as tablets and computers, lack of internet infrastructure, and a large gap between the "haves" and the "have-nots" when it comes to access to personal devices which can be used for education. This section will examine ICT use in South Africa prior to the COVID-19 pandemic.

=== History of ICT use in South African Education ===
The early years of ICT adoption occurred from 1996 to 2000. During this time, some South African higher education institutions began using computers and many institutions built computer labs. At this time, computers were used mainly by staff, but some institutions also implemented computer-based education or computer-aided instruction for learners as well. This type of learning reflected behavioral philosophy and focused on drilling and practicing. The next phase of ICT adoption, between 2001 and 2005, saw a focus on creating more access for learners, including "basic connectivity, wired schools and educator development."^{:847} Computer use for students expanded, while staff were introduced to email and the internet. During this time, ICTs were most often used to find information and for word processing tasks.

Starting around 2005-2006, ICT use within the South African student population began to include mobile phones. However, while students began using their mobile phones for educational purposes, institutions lagged behind and did not generally implement learning opportunities via mobile-based teaching. Furthermore, social media use exploded with the advent of Facebook, launched in 2005, and other sites. YouTube, which started around the same time as Facebook, also became an educational tool over the years. Instant messaging and other short message services such as Mxit, released in 2005, and WhatsApp, launched in 2014, were also adopted, mainly by students. Web conferencing via programs like Skype and learning management systems like Edmodo also gained popularity in South African education.

In the 2010s, a few other ICTs were introduced, including MELFA (Mobile E-Learning for Africa), the Dr. Maths initiative, Yoza, and M-Thuto. Each of these ICTs were focused on multilingual language learning, and the Dr. Maths initiative also supported mathematics learning.^{:8} Some teachers also mentioned referring students to Mindset, a government-developed program "which enables students to access on-line videos related to mathematics." As the decade progressed, education continued to embrace varying educational technologies, and with the arrival of the COVID-19 global pandemic, educational ICTs were pushed even more to the forefront of education across the world, including in South Africa.

=== Barriers to Implementing ICT Faced by South African Educational Institutions ===
One of the biggest barriers to ICT usage in South Africa, at least prior to the COVID-19 pandemic, was the lack of a solid infrastructure and internet access throughout the entire country. In 2017, only about 22% of the population had access to the internet. Public internet access, at places such as internet cafes, existed for students in urban areas, but rural areas sometimes lacked the infrastructure needed for consistent internet access. In a study undertaken at the University of South Africa (UNISA), one student from a rural area spoke of lack of internet causing them to fall behind in their studies, indicating that internet access did indeed impact education in South Africa prior to the COVID-19 pandemic. Furthermore, in rural areas, less personal resources, such as personal computers and tablets, were available, often due to low socioeconomic status and being unable to afford such luxuries.

Within the schools, additional barriers existed to ICT usage. One such barrier was a lack of teachers who were competent and comfortable with ICTs. Research has revealed that discomfort faced by Ghanaian teachers in integrating ICTs into their work was due to, among other things, insufficient digital skills caused by a lack of integration of ICT adoption into teaching and learning. Technical support assists in bridging that gap of ICT competency in teachers, but other barriers persist. Teachers sometimes resisted ICT adoption, believing ICTs were useless or even a hindrance to learning.

Lack of resources and overcrowding were also major barriers within schools to ICT use prior to the COVID-19 pandemic. In a 2010 study by Chigona and Chigona, a participant stated "On average our class sizes are 40 plus learners...the Khanya lab has capacity to support 25 learners only. There are only 25 computers in the lab."^{:10} Another participant stated, "if you got 2000 kids in a school and you have 25 or 30 computers, it is absolutely no good."^{:10} These quotes illustrate the difficulty with implementing ICTs for education when resources are limited and schools are overcrowded.

A final barrier faced by schools that is worth mentioning is the same as stated in the paragraph above – lack of a solid infrastructure and internet access. Besides internet access, infrastructure needed by schools included reliable electricity. Some rural schools had unreliable internet, which impeded ICT usage within the schools.

As seen in this section, while South Africa did have some ICT adoption starting around 1996, it was a slow process, with South Africa lagging behind due to several barriers. Two of the largest barriers – lack of internet access and lack of resources – have been addressed through several government initiatives, discussed in the next section.

The Department of Basic Education action plan in 2015 provides strategies to integrate the use of ICT in South African education:

- Knowledge of various technologies accessible in schools
- Establishing collaborations with stakeholders to drive electronic education
- Introducing a link between the usage of ICT in the classroom and learning outcomes
- Analysing the status quo of electronic education initiatives and their results.

=== South Africa Connect and other Governmental Initiatives ===
In developing countries, ICTs are proposed as tools to assist in reducing the digital divide, especially in education where they can, among other things, provide access to secondary learning materials with hard-copy textbooks still being the recommended primary sources. South Africa has identified ICTs as a tool to enhance students access to education. Despite the identification and introduction of ICTs in most African education system, the expansion and its adoption remain slow due to a lack of effective ICT policies and a long run supporting ICT infrastructure (e.g., electricity, Internet, software, and hardware devices), teacher capacity, and financial resources. These challenges are being recognized and addressed.

South Africa Connect, the country's national broadband policy of 2013, mandates the introduction of a broadband connection (with a download speed of at least 100 Mbps) to every primary school and secondary school as part of an initiative to ensure the countrywide availability of broadband internet access by the year 2030. Rwanda provides another example of an African government placing ICT in the forefront of policy creation towards transforming their Education and consequently their economy. Aligned with the Smart Rwanda Master Plan, the Education Sector Strategic Plan (ESSP), and the Draft ICT in Education Policy, the ICT in Education Master Plan is seen as a strategic lever for achieving this transformational vision.

Other examples of projects to expand technology enhanced learning in South Africa include Connect-ED project to put computers and Internet points of presence in teacher colleges, ICT-based curriculum materials, supporting connectivity and training in schools, e-libraries etc. These various policies and programs were developed to address the various barriers previously discussed. In particular the national broadband policy positions the enhancement of teachers' and principals' internet connectivity as necessary to support access to, and the use of, learning materials that can enhance learning in classrooms and foster the development of students' digital skills.

Despite these efforts ICT is at an embryonic stage in the majority of African countries. Supporting evidence is seen in school policy prohibiting student use of personal digital devices (with the exception of calculators) on school premises and suggests a potential disconnect between bottom-up sentiment at the level of rural schools and the top-down South Africa Connect drive for increased ICT use. There is still enormous work to be done in Africa's education system to ensure that all countries uniformly meet the 2030 United Nations Sustainable Development Goal number 4, which is to "Ensure inclusive and quality education for all and promote lifelong learning."^{:23}

=== Information and communication technology (ICT) use in South African education used during and post-COVID-19 ===
The COVID-19 pandemic caused the shutdown of businesses and institutions across the globe affecting daily activities including the teaching and learning process in schools. On March 26, 2020, South Africa opted for lockdown requiring schools to move to distance learning. The challenge of offering traditional face-to-face teaching-learning sessions to fully online or digital sessions shifted the former teacher-driven process into the hands of learner-parent and technology processes. Measures put into place such as lockdowns and social distancing tried to limit the spread of the COVID-19 disease while use of innovation and technology were implemented to continue learning while navigating unknown territory. Computers, laptops, the internet, tablets, smartboards, and projectors are referred to as information and communication technologies (ICTs). ICTs can enhance learning for disadvantaged students who are unable to attend classes but at the same time, barriers may exist such as lack of resources, poor internet access, and lack of training for teachers

Inequalities were already known in the education system in South Africa and COVID-19 exposed even more. For socioeconomically disadvantaged schools, the ability to effectively shift to online learning was elusive with the lack of resources "such as computers, tablets, the internet, skilled teachers, and other digital learning devices."^{:71} In addition to the lack of resources available for remote learning, focusing on learning while in the home environment was difficult due to lack of space available for uninterrupted learning.

Teachers faced challenges moving their classroom content to the online environment in a short period of time, especially in rural areas. Teachers had limited knowledge and training regarding online platforms and technologies. Mpungose suggested the importance of emotional connections in the teaching and learning environment as a way to promote successful learning by sharing stories, discussion of case studies, use of critical reflection, and incorporating engaging activities in the online environment such as break out rooms for small group discussion. Adu et al. suggest the Department of Higher Education and Training (DHET) provide schools with digital equipment and teachers are trained in digital skills and strategies for teaching and learning in the digital arena.

Mhlanga and Moloi suggest the COVID-19 pandemic was a motivating factor towards digital transformation in South Africa that should have already been in process. In the post-pandemic era, there is an increasing global call to adopt information and communication technologies (ICTs) in teaching and learning. Mhlanga and Moloi recommend fiscal expansion of funding for online education. There is also a need to equip teachers and students with ICT skills for maximum benefit of digital education and move forward in South Africa's educational goals.

As discussed, ICT usage in South African education has slowly developed from computer use for basic functions like word processing to mobile technology and app usage by students and into web conferencing and massive distance learning prompted by the COVID-19 pandemic. Though barriers exist, including lack of internet infrastructure, lack of resources, and inequity in access, ICT likely will continue to be embraced in South African education.

== Performance ==
An independent study by Stellenbosch University researchers found that undue union influence and "critical educational factors", including weak institutional functionality, uneducated teachers and insufficient learning time, were responsible for poor academic performance in South Africa. Due to poor academic performance, teen pregnancy, and crime the country has a high dropout rate. In 2020, seven Limpopo schools (down from 9 the previous year, and among 18 nationwide) obtained a 0% pass rate in the National Senior Certificate exams. The locally dismal performance was ascribed to uncommitted teachers, proximity of schools to taverns, inactive governing bodies and the apartheid legacy. School curricula and the structuring of exams have been criticized as following an antiquated paradigm which does not cater to the requirements of innovation or the 4IR economy, while not addressing real-life problems like finding a job, thinking critically or conducting original research.

== Violence ==
The South African Human Rights Commission has found that 40% of children interviewed said they had been the victims of crime at school. More than a fifth of sexual assaults on South African children were found to have taken place in schools. Gang fighting in schools, whereby dangerous weapons which include guns, are used, has also become common in recent years, specifically in Cape Town, Western Cape.

The Education Department and the Centre for Justice and Crime Prevention initiated a program named Hlayiseka to curb the epidemic of violence in South African schools.

Map of South Africa

== See also ==
- Educational management in South Africa
