= Department of Military Veterans =

South African government department

Department of Military Veterans (DMV)

Department overview
- Formed: 28 December 2011
- Jurisdiction: Government of South Africa
- Headquarters: 328 Festival Street, Hatfield, South Africa; 25.75°S 28.18°E
- Employees: 180
- Annual budget: R 912.75 million (2026/27)
- Minister responsible: Angie Motshekga, Minister of Defence and Military Veterans
- Deputy Ministers responsible: Gen. (Ret) Bantubonke Holomisa, Deputy Minister of Defence and Military Veterans; Richard Mkhungo, Deputy Minister of Defence and Military Veterans
- Department executive: Nontobeko Mafu, Acting Director-General
- Website: www.dmv.gov.za

The Department of Military Veterans (DMV) is a separate government department and no longer a sub-department of the Department of Defence. The Department is responsible for providing support and services to veterans of the South African military, including veterans of the armed wings of anti-apartheid movements (Umkhonto we Sizwe, APLA, etc.). The political head of the department is the Minister of Defence and Military Veterans; as of 2024 this is Angie Motshekga. Her two deputies are deputy are Retired General Bantu Holomisa and Richard Mkhungo (Hlophe). The current administrative head of the department is Acting Director-General Nontobeko Mafu
