= Sibusiso Bengu =

South African politician (1934–2024)

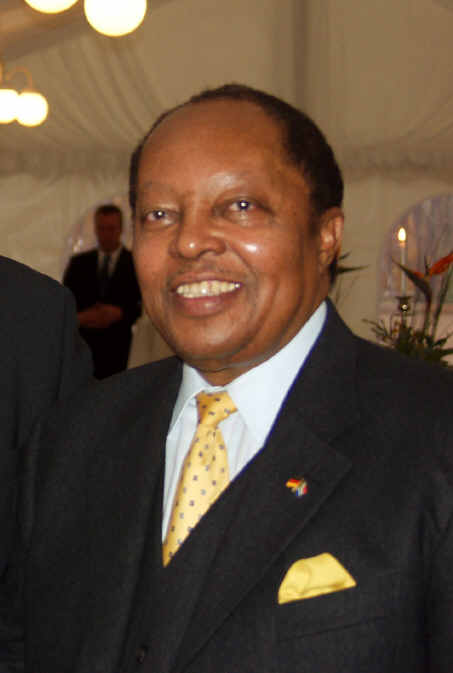
- Bengu in 2007

South African Ambassador to Germany
- In office 1999–2003
- President: Thabo Mbeki
- Preceded by: Lindiwe Mabuza
- Succeeded by: Moss Chikane

Minister of Education
- In office 11 May 1994 – 14 June 1999
- President: Nelson Mandela
- Deputy: Smangaliso Mkhatshwa
- Preceded by: Piet Marais
- Succeeded by: Kader Asmal

Vice-Chancellor of the University of Fort Hare
- In office 1991–1994
- Preceded by: J. A. Lamprecht
- Succeeded by: Mbulelo Mzamane

Personal details
- Born: Sibusiso Mandlenkosi Emmanuel Bengu; 8 May 1934 Kranskop, Natal Province; Union of South Africa
- Died: 30 December 2024 (aged 90) Mtunzini, South Africa
- Party: African National Congress
- Other political affiliations: Inkatha Freedom Party (1975–1978)
- Spouse: Funeka Bengu
- Education: University of South Africa; University of Geneva; Graduate Institute of International Studies

Sibusiso Mandlenkosi Emmanuel Bengu (8 May 1934 – 30 December 2024) was a South African academic and politician. He was the first post-apartheid Minister of Education between May 1994 and June 1999. Before that, he was the vice-chancellor of the University of Fort Hare from 1991 to 1994. A former secretary-general of Inkatha, he represented the African National Congress (ANC) in the government.

Between 1952 and 1978, Bengu was a teacher in his home province, Natal, where he founded the Dlangezwa High School in 1969 and became the inaugural secretary-general of Inkatha in 1975. After falling out with Inkatha leader Mangosuthu Buthelezi, he went into self-imposed exile between 1978 and 1991, working in Geneva for the Lutheran World Federation.

In the April 1994 general election, Bengu was elected to represent the ANC in the newly established National Assembly of South Africa, and he became Minister of Education in President Nelson Mandela's cabinet. In that office he pursued controversial early reforms to South African education policy, including a nationwide program to redeploy teachers and a shift to outcome-based education under Curriculum 2005.

He left the government at the June 1999 general election and served as South African Ambassador to Germany until 2003, when he retired. He was also a member of the ANC National Executive Committee between 1994 and 2002.

== Early life and education ==
Bengu was born in Kranskop in the former Natal Province on 8 May 1934. His paternal uncle was the evangelist Reverend Nicholas Bhengu, and his father was also a Lutheran minister. He was educated at the University of South Africa, where he completed a Bachelor's degree and Honours degree in history in 1966, and at the University of Geneva-affiliated Graduate Institute of International Studies, where he completed a PhD in political science in 1974.

== Early political and teaching career ==
Bengu began his career as a teacher in 1952. Between 1969 and 1976, he was the inaugural principal of the Dlangezwa High School near Empangeni, which he founded. He left the school in 1977 to become director of student affairs at the University of Zululand.

During this period, in 1975, Mangosuthu Buthelezi founded Inkatha, the political movement that dominated KwaZulu for the next two decades, and Bengu became the organisation's secretary-general. However, due to clashes with Buthelezi, Bengu left his job and party in 1978 and went into self-imposed exile in Geneva. He was secretary for research and social action at the Lutheran World Federation until 1991, when he returned to South Africa during the negotiations to end apartheid.

Upon his return, Bengu was the first black vice-chancellor of the University of Fort Hare between 1991 and 1994. Meanwhile, Bengu had struck up a friendship with Oliver Tambo, president of the African National Congress (ANC), during his exile, and he stood as an ANC candidate in South Africa's April 1994 general election.

== Minister of Education: 1994–1999 ==
Bengu was elected to the National Assembly of South Africa in the 1994 election, and newly elected President Nelson Mandela appointed him to the cabinet as Minister of Education. He suffered a stroke soon after his appointment, and public concerns about his health continued to linger as late as 1996. Throughout his tenure he was consistently criticised for a perceived lack of vigor, a perception which the Mail & Guardian suggested was compounded by his lack of personal charisma and media profile. The same newspaper later described him as having provoked an "escalating hum of frustration at his hands-off, 'it's not my problem' approach to every new crisis which drifted his way".

=== Policy platforms ===
Inheriting an education system distorted by the apartheid programme of Bantu Education, Bengu pursued a number of major reforms in the Department of Education and its education policy. During his first year in office the department undertook amendments to the history curriculum, and in 1997 Bengu announced a wholesale revision of the national curriculum under the new Curriculum 2005, an outcome-based education system. According to the consensus assessment of the new curriculum, "Its essential problem was that no one could understand it." Bengu also announced a new school language policy in 1997.

Perhaps most controversially, from 1995 onwards, the education ministry pursued a new centralised policy in teacher employment, known as the redeployment process (initially right-sizing and redeployment; later rationalisation and redeployment). Under the new policy, provincial education departments were empowered to "redeploy" teachers to achieve redistributive policy aims – primarily moving experienced teachers to poor black-majority school districts, where school budgets were systematically augmented – but teachers retained the option to escape redeployment by accepting a voluntary severance package. By January 1997, some 18,000 teachers had applied for voluntary severance, and Bengu, acquiescing in a common criticism of the policy, admitted that the primary effect of voluntary severance had been to retrench experienced teachers – few of whom accepted redeployment – while costing the department millions of rands. Later in 1997, the Grove Primary School in Cape Town mounted a successful legal challenge to the policy in the Cape High Court, but the policy survived after Bengu's department entrenched it in an Education Laws Amendment Bill, passed later in 1997.

=== ANC National Executive Committee ===
During his tenure as Education Minister, Bengu served as a member of the ANC's National Executive Committee for two terms between 1994 and 2002. He was first elected to the committee at the ANC's 49th National Conference in Bloemfontein in December 1994, and he was re-elected at the 50th National Conference in Mafikeng in December 1997.

=== Resignation and aftermath ===
Bengu served only one parliamentary term in government, declining to seek re-election to the National Assembly in the June 1999 general election. After the election, Kader Asmal was appointed to replace him as Minister of Education. One of Asmal's first major acts as minister was to call for an urgent review of Curriculum 2005, leading in subsequent years to a major revision of the policy. Asmal also reversed the teacher redeployment process in 2001, saying that it had achieved its objectives with the redeployment of over 25,000 teachers.

In August 1999, President Thabo Mbeki appointed Bengu as South African Ambassador to Germany. He held that position until 2003, when he retired. He also dropped off the ANC National Executive Committee in December 2002.

== Personal life and death ==
He was married to Funeka Bengu and had four daughters and a son. He died in his sleep on 30 December 2024, aged 90, at his home in Mtunzini, KwaZulu-Natal.
