= Department of Bantu Education =

Bantu Education Department

The Department of Bantu Education was an organization created by the National Party of South Africa in 1953. The Bantu Education Act, 1953 provided the legislative framework for this department.

== Function of the department ==
Before the Bantu Education Act was passed, apartheid in education tended to be implemented in a haphazard and uneven manner. The purpose of the act was to consolidate Bantu education, i.e., education of black people, so that discriminatory educational practices could be uniformly implemented across South Africa. Previously, black education was administered by provincial governments. With the creation of the department, the central national government assumed control of all black education in South Africa. Racial segregation in education became mandatory under the Act.

Initially, a poll tax levied solely on black South Africans was collected to pay for Bantu education. In 1972, the government started using general taxes collected from White South Africans to fund a portion of black education. One of the hallmarks of Bantu education was a disparity between the quality of education available to different ethnic groups. Black education received one-tenth of the resources allocated to white education; throughout apartheid, black children were educated in classes with teacher-pupil ratios of 1:56. Dilapidated school buildings, a lack of textbooks, and poor teacher training were problems that the department was never able (or willing) to address.

== Curricula under the department ==
The department sought to equip black students with the abilities needed to function as low-skilled workers. Abstract thinking and subjects deemed to be of no use to manual laborers (such as mathematics and science) were neglected. Teaching an apartheid-friendly version of Christian values to students was also prioritized. In educational materials, black culture was portrayed as primitive, rural, and unchanging.

== Responses ==
Many missionary societies provided education to black schoolchildren. These schools were partially funded by the national government but operated with some autonomy. Racial segregation was not a defining feature of missionary education. The Bantu Education Act consolidated educational apartheid and forced mission schools to implement strict racial segregation in order to qualify for financial assistance. Many mission schools refused to co-operate with the National Party government and ceased operating after the passage of the act.

== End of the department ==
In 1994, after South Africa's first multiracial elections, the department ceased to operate. All of its functions were absorbed by several government departments. Though the post-apartheid government has committed itself to providing quality schooling to students of all races, education in South Africa continues to be hampered by the legacy of the department and other institutions.
