= Piet Marais =

South African politician (1932–2001)

House of Assembly

Assembly Member for Stellenbosch
- In office 1982–1994

Personal details
- Born: Pieter Gabriel Marais; 23 October 1932 Robertson, Cape Province; Union of South Africa
- Died: 28 December 2001 (aged 69) Stellenbosch, Western Cape; Republic of South Africa
- Party: National Party

Pieter Gabriel Marais (23 October 1932 in Robertson - 28 December 2001) was a South African politician who served as the last Minister of Education of the apartheid era. He represented the National Party (NP) in the House of Assembly from 1982 to 1994, serving the Stellenbosch constituency, and went on to represent the NP in the first democratic Parliament from 1994 until his retirement in 1999.

== Life and career ==
Marais entered the House of Assembly in a by-election in 1982 and served as MP for his hometown, Stellenbosch. He was a member of the NP's progressive verligte ("enlightened") caucus, which supported reforming the apartheid system. Under President F. W. de Klerk, he served as minister for white education during the democratic transition, and in that capacity he was involved in constitutional negotiations.

In the 1994 general election, Marais was elected to represent the NP in the new National Assembly, though he was transferred to the National Council of Provinces during the legislative term. He was the NP's lead negotiator in negotiations on the education clause of the 1996 Constitution, and he also served as an adviser to NP leader Marthinus van Schalkwyk. He retired from politics in 1999 and died on 28 December 2001 in Stellenbosch, several weeks after being diagnosed with liver cancer.

== Personal life ==
He was married to Annatjie Marais, with whom he had three children.

Political offices
| Preceded by Louis Pienaar | Minister of Education; 1992–1994 | Succeeded by Sibusiso Bengu |
