= Minister of Education (South Africa) =

Cabinet member responsible for learning

The minister of education was a minister in the Cabinet of South Africa responsible for overseeing the Department of Education, including South Africa's schools and universities.

On 10 May 2009 newly elected president Jacob Zuma split the education portfolio into that of the minister of basic education and that of the minister of higher education and training.

== Ministers with responsibility for education ==
Minister	Ministry	Incumbency	Under
François Stephanus Malan	Education	1910–1921	Louis Botha→Jan Smuts (1919-'21)
Sir Patrick Duncan	Interior, education and public health	1921–1924	J. B. M. Hertzog
Daniel François Malan	Interior, education and public health	1924–1933	J. B. M. Hertzog
Jan Hendrik Hofmeyr	Finance and education	1933–1948	Jan Smuts
Albert Jacobus Stals	Education	1948–1949	D.F. Malan
Charles Roberts Swart	Education	1949–1950	D.F. Malan
Johannes Hendrikus Viljoen	Education, arts and science	1950–1957	D.F. Malan
J.J. Serfontein	Education, arts and science	1958–1961	Hans Strydom
Johannes de Klerk	Education, arts and science	1961–1966	Hendrik Verwoerd
Johannes de Klerk	Education, arts and sciences and information	1966–1967	John Vorster
Johannes de Klerk	National education	1968–1969	John Vorster
Johannes Petrus van der Spuy	Education and training		
Ferdinand Hartzenberg	Education and training	1979–1982	PW Botha
Gerrit Viljoen	National education	1980–1989	PW Botha
F. W. de Klerk	National education and planning	1984–1989	PW Botha
Piet Clase	Education and culture	1985–1989	PW Botha
Gene Louw	Education	1989–1990	FW De Klerk
Louis Pienaar	Education	1990–1992	FW De Klerk
Piet Marais	Education	1992–1994	FW De Klerk

=== Post-apartheid period ===
Minister	Ministry	Incumbency	Under
Sibusiso Bengu	Education	1994–1999	Nelson Mandela
Kader Asmal	Education	1999–2004	Thabo Mbeki
Naledi Pandor	Education	2004–2008	Thabo Mbeki
Naledi Pandor	Education	2008–2009	Kgalema Motlanthe
Angie Motshekga	Basic education	2009–2024	Jacob Zuma
Blade Nzimande	Higher education and training	2009–2024	Jacob Zuma

== See also ==
- Department of Education (South Africa)
