= Minister of Basic Education =

Minister in the Cabinet of South Africa

South Africa Minister of Basic Education
- Flag of South Africa

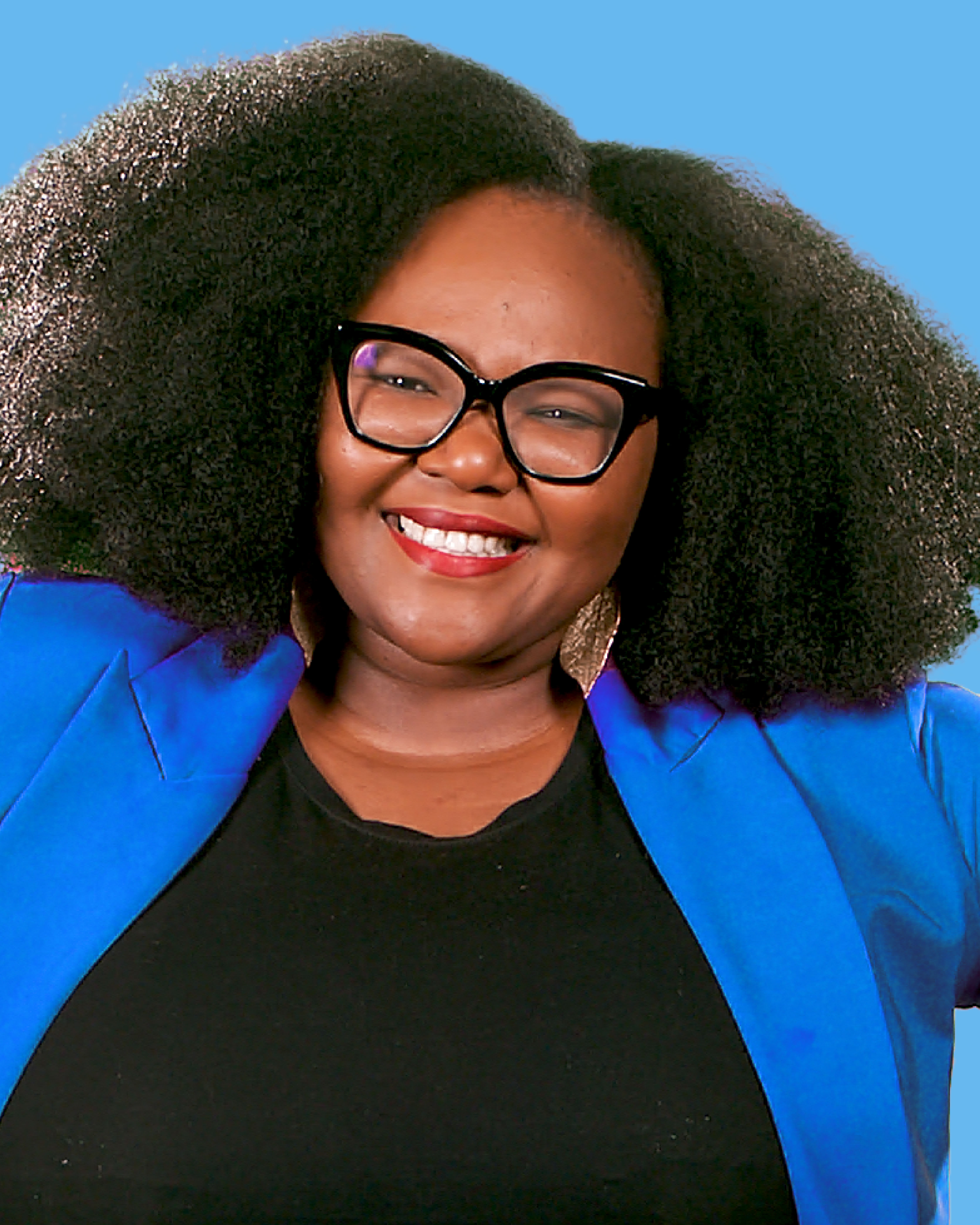
- Incumbent; Siviwe Gwarube since 3 July 2024
- Department of Basic Education
- Style: The Honourable
- Appointer: President of South Africa
- Inaugural holder: Angie Motshekga
- Formation: 11 May 2009
- Deputy: Reginah Mhaule
- Salary: R2,211,937
- Website: Department of Basic Education

The Minister of Basic Education is the minister in the Cabinet of South Africa who has political responsibility for the Department of Basic Education. The portfolio includes both primary and secondary education. The Ministry is currently led by Democratic Alliance member Siviwe Gwarube, who has held the position since 2024.

The role complements the Minister of Higher Education, who is responsible for tertiary education in the country, and thus leads the Department of Higher Education and Training.

Formerly, basic education was the responsibility of the Minister of Education. When announcing his first cabinet on 10 May 2009, former South African President Jacob Zuma bifurcated that ministry, creating the Minister of Basic Education and separate Minister of Higher Education and Training positions.

African National Congress member Angie Motshekga was appointed as the inaugural Minister of Basic Education, a position she retained for the next 15 years, until 2024.

After the formation of the multiparty coalition Government of National Unity, on 30 June 2024, Democratic Alliance Minister Siviwe Gwarube was appointed as Minister of Basic Education - the first time a different political party had run the Ministry in post-democratic South Africa. She was sworn into office on 3 July 2024.

== List of ministers ==
List of ministers responsible for basic education, 1994–present
Ministry	Minister	Portrait	Term		Party	President
Education	Sibusiso Bengu		1994	1999	ANC	Mandela
Education	Kader Asmal		1999	2004	ANC	Mbeki
Education	Naledi Pandor		2004	2009	ANC	Mbeki; Motlanthe
Basic Education	Angie Motshekga		2009	2024	ANC	Zuma; Ramaphosa
Basic Education	Siviwe Gwarube		2024	–	DA	Ramaphosa
