= Educational management in South Africa =

Education in South Africa
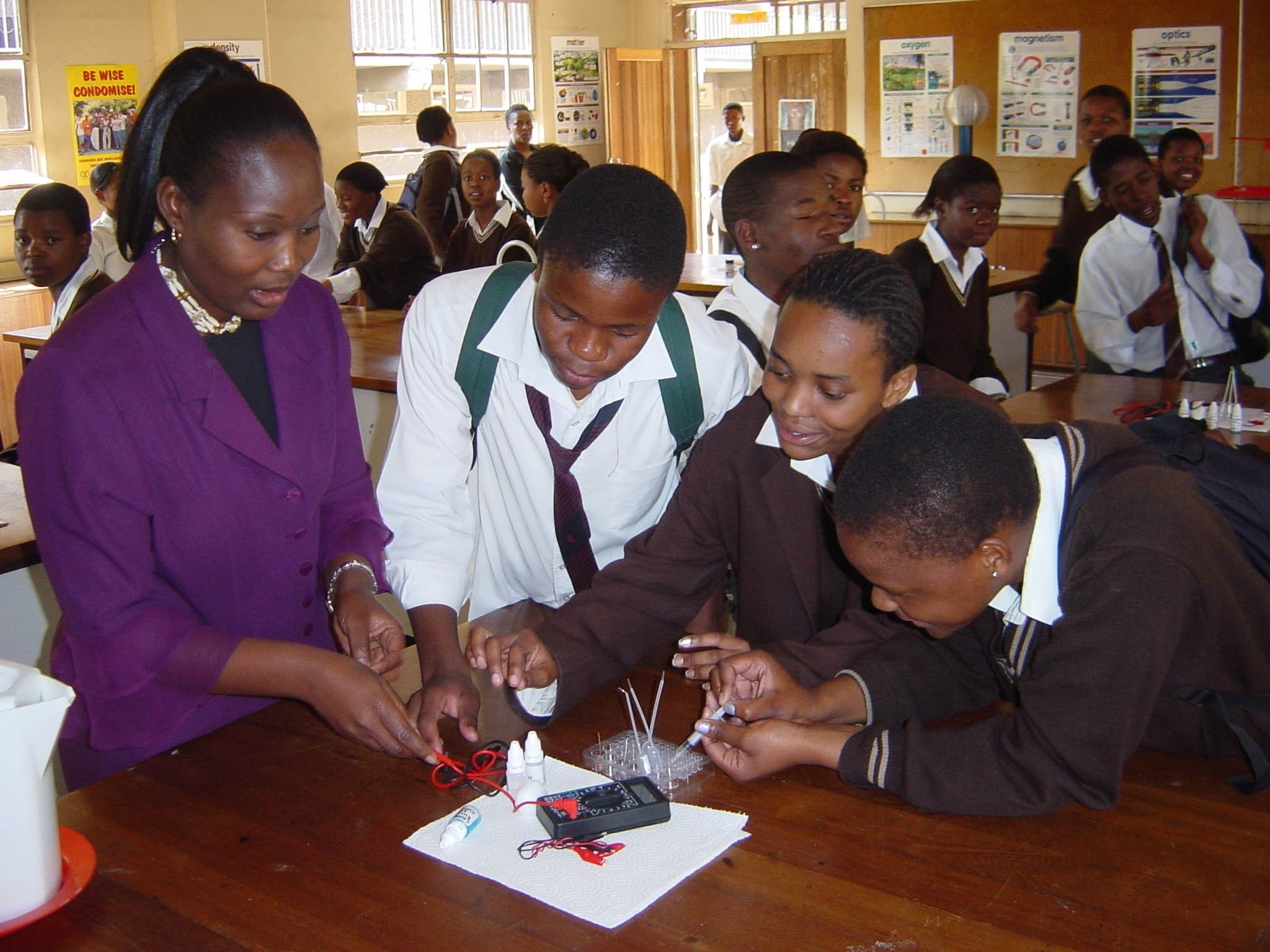

General details
- Primary languages: English
- System type: Education in South Africa

Educational management in South Africa involves overseeing the country's educational policies, administration, and implementation. South Africa has the highest quality of education in the African continent.

However, the country faces challenges in education including historical inequalities, inadequate professional development for educational staff, and financial constraints. Poor educational management is a factor in these challenges.

The South African government has made efforts to improve the educational management system by using participatory and democratic leadership; establishing professional qualifications and training; improving school autonomy and cultural diversity management; and strengthening infrastructure and financial management.

== Introduction of educational management in South Africa ==
=== System ===
The education system in South Africa comprises three levels: primary education, secondary education, and higher education. Secondary schools include both junior high school and senior high school. Higher education is divided into two parts: vocational education and university education.

The Department of Basic Education is responsible for elementary and secondary education, while the Department of Higher Education and Training oversees post-secondary-level education, including academic education and post-secondary technical training.

==== Primary school ====
Primary education in South Africa lasts for seven years (R-6 grades), and is divided into basic and intermediate stages, primarily focusing on basic education. During primary school, all courses are compulsory.

Students usually begin primary school at the age of six. At the elementary school level, the student's level is assessed by the test scores.

The qualification for elementary school graduation is carried out independently by each elementary school. There is no national level examination. At the end of the primary school cycle, no formal qualification certificate is issued.

==== Secondary school ====
Secondary education lasts for six years and is divided into two stages: junior high school and high school.

Junior high school (7-9 grades) is also called advanced stage and is mandatory.

High school (10-12 grades), which is also known as Further Education and Training (FET), is not mandatory.

High school students choose academic or technical study. Throughout high school, students will study seven courses, including four compulsory courses and three elective courses.

At the end of grade 12, there is a national standardized exam, and graduation is based on the exam results. After graduation, a national certificate, issued by the National Senior Certificate, is awarded. This certificate is also called a "matric."

==== Higher education ====
There are two types of higher education in South Africa: vocational and technical education, and university education. Due to high rates of unemployment among the youth, South Africa attaches great importance to technical education, with the aim of cultivating professional and technical talents to increase employment and promote economic development. University education focuses on academic research, and public universities dominate private universities.

== Problem of educational management in South Africa ==
=== Discriminatory education ===
Education inequality in South Africa is largely attributable to the apartheid system that lasted from 1948–1991. Despite significant financial investment in education by the South African government, there has not been a noticeable improvement in the quality of education. To some degree, discriminatory education still affects South Africa's education and educational management.

=== Leadership management ===
Racial discrimination in the selection of school leaders may result in a selection process that is perceived as unfair. This can lead to the appointment of principals who may not have the requisite professional qualifications or experience. Ineffectively managed schools are often a consequence of such leadership, potentially hindering the delivery of quality education.

In terms of management, there may be instances where a school treats teachers and students differently based on ethnic considerations. This suggests that fairness in educational management has not been fully achieved, which could be detrimental to the development of effective educational practices.

=== Teaching and schooling management ===
In terms of teaching, the quality of the teaching provided by teachers is not high, because teachers themselves are educated by a low standard education system. Moreover, there has not a high standard for the teaching management, which leads to the high rate of absenteeism of teachers. According to SACMEQ III, in 2007, South Africa had highest rate of the absenteeism compared with other countries participating in the survey. Also, it is worth noting that the absentee rate continues to rise after the year of 2007.

On the other hand, the quality of teaching provided by teachers is influenced not only by their level of knowledge but also by their beliefs and values. Specifically, a teacher's understanding of education and their perception of the teaching profession can impact their attitudes towards teaching to some degree.

Additionally, due to historical factors, racial discrimination in South Africa is a significant element that affects the quality of teaching. This issue can influence teachers' attitudes toward their profession and their interactions with students, often based on their own identity. Moreover, students who differ from the dominant identity may experience varying levels of educational engagement, leading to imbalances in educational opportunities.

=== Finance ===
==== School funds ====
The school does not have enough funds to support or protect a various type of infrastructure and learning site construction at the schools. In South Africa, a large number of school lack piped water, electricity sources, and also public health facilities. In terms of learning site construction, more than half of the schools in South Africa have not constructed libraries and laboratories. In addition, the teaching equipment and leaning materials are also restricted. The inadequate facilities could also be a significant factor which contributes to the limited education.

==== Tuition fees ====
The loss of learning opportunities for students who are unable to afford to pay tuition fees is another important reason for the low level of education in South Africa.

Although the tuition fees of schools do not appear to be economically stressful for the family, according to the average monthly income for South African individuals shown by the survey. However, the gap between the rich and the poor in South Africa is huge, which can be translated into the fact that the average monthly income does not reflect the actual situation.

In higher education, more than half of South African youth say they are unable to pay tuition. This has led to the youth lack of access to education.

== Improvement of educational management in South Africa ==
=== Leadership and management ===
Leadership management is evolving towards greater participation and democracy, with an emphasis on self-management and internal decentralization.

Educational institutions establish initial entry qualifications for principals, ensuring that candidates are professionally qualified and suitable for the role.

Additionally, there is an increased focus on the training and development of principals to enhance their effectiveness in school leadership.

=== Strategic management ===
Improving school autonomy, providing a better school management team and establishing a governing body of schools.

Managing cultural diversity so that diversity can be re-recognise, which helps to help cultural inequality in the management of education.

=== Teaching and schooling management ===
The school should guarantee the professionalism of the teachers to ensure a high level of education quality. Furthermore, the teaching materials should be considered to be improved.

=== Finance ===
==== Infrastructure ====
The infrastructure of schools, including water, power, and building construction, is planned for enhancement.

The government has established specialized and relevant education departments to oversee and manage infrastructure development. The Accelerated Schools Infrastructure Delivery Initiative (ASIDI) is tasked with strengthening school infrastructure, while the Department of Basic Education (DBE) focuses on improvements in this area.

This initiative aims to make the development of infrastructure plans more secure.

As a result, the quality of teaching is expected to remain unaffected by infrastructural deficiencies, such as inadequate water, electricity, or school buildings, thereby promoting a better learning environment.

==== Tuition fees ====
The government establishes a school governing bodies (SGB). Tuition fees are set and managed by the institution. The families which are unable to pay tuition fees can apply to the institution to waive part or all of the tuition fees.

At the same time, South Africa is also developing more and more low-cost private schools in.

==== Development of visual learning ====
Virtualisation courses development such as radio and video courses, social software online learning, which learners could get the knowledge though instead of paying for the real school. As a result, the development of various visual learning might solve problems that cannot be learned due to tuition fees to some degree.
