= Richard Mkhungo =

South African politician (born 1959)

Deputy Minister of Defence and Military Veterans
- Incumbent
- Assumed office 3 July 2024 Serving with Bantu Holomisa
- President: Cyril Ramaphosa
- Minister: Angie Motshekga
- Preceded by: Thabang Makwetla

Personal details
- Born: Conduct Richard Hlophe; 7 July 1959 (age 66)
- Citizenship: South African
- Party: African National Congress
- Other political affiliations: South African National Civics Organisation

Conduct Richard Hlophe (born 7 July 1959), commonly known as Richard Mkhungo, is a South African politician from KwaZulu-Natal. He is currently serving as the Deputy Minister of Defence and Military Veterans since July 2024. A member of the African National Congress (ANC), he was elected as the national president of the South African National Civics Organisation in November 2023. He was formerly a local councillor in eThekwini.

== Early life and career ==
Mkhungo was born on 7 July 1959. Hlophe, his legal surname, is his mother's surname.

He rose to political prominence as a trade unionist in the South African Municipal Workers' Union, first as a union organiser and then as the union's provincial secretary in KwaZulu-Natal between 1998 and 2006. He also served stints in the provincial leadership of the Congress of South African Trade Unions (COSATU) and as president of the Chemical, Energy, Paper, Printing, Wood and Allied Workers' Union.

== South African National Civics Organisation ==
In the August 2016 local elections, Mkhungo was elected to represent the African National Congress (ANC) as a local councillor in the eThekwini Metropolitan Municipality. He was elected to chair the council's ethics committee. At the same time, he held high office in the South African National Civics Organisation (SANCO), the ANC's alliance partner; by 2016 he was the provincial secretary of SANCO's KwaZulu-Natal branch.

Over the next year he became a prominent figure in the regional politics surrounding the ANC's upcoming 54th National Conference, which would select a successor to ANC president Jacob Zuma. The Mail & Guardian said that Mkhungo was a supporter of Nkosazana Dlamini-Zuma's leadership bid, which also had Zuma's support. However, Mkhungo also endorsed both of the other frontrunners: in May 2017, Mkhungo's provincial leadership corps formally endorsed Cyril Ramaphosa, and Mkhungo told press that he viewed Ramaphosa as "fit and ready to ascend"; then, in September 2017, he announced that the leadership corps had decided to back Zweli Mkhize instead. Ramaphosa was elected when the 54th National Conference was held in December 2017.

In August 2018, Mkhungo was at the centre of a major factional dispute between his allies and SANCO national leaders Skhumbuzo Mpanza and Richard Mdakane. On 11 August, Mpanza, as SANCO's national secretary general, issued Mkhungo with a formal suspension from his position as provincial secretary. He was accused of ill-discipline and of bringing the organisation into dispute. Mkhungo said that he would challenge the suspension in court if necessary and that "there is no way we will allow a situation where I will vacate the office". The spat was linked to SANCO's upcoming national elective conference, at which Mkhungo was expected to stand for Mpanza's position on a slate aligned to presidential candidate Roy Moodley. In the aftermath he regained his position as national secretary, and Mdakane and Mpanza were arrested in January 2019, accused of stealing from SANCO.

Mkhungo was re-elected as SANCO provincial secretary at a provincial elective conference in Durban on 27 January 2023. The same conference elected Lucky Hadebe as Mkhungo's deputy, and it also elected former president Zuma as SANCO's provincial chairperson. Mkhungo said that SANCO sought to "learn from [Zuma] and give him a platform to mobilise communities". Responding to rumours that Zuma would use SANCO as a vehicle to contest the 2024 general election, Mkhungo said that he could not rule out that SANCO might split from the ANC and register as a political party; he told City Press that if the ANC sidelined Zuma and SANCO, "We will make their lives difficult."

In the run-up to the election, Mkhungo's faction of SANCO (known as the Durban faction) held a series of reconciliatory meetings with their opponents (the so-called Alexandra faction) which culminated in a decision to disband Mkhungo and Zuma's provincial leadership corps. Instead, Mkhungo was appointed as national convener of the interim leadership that was appointed to lead the national organisation until fresh leadership elections could be held. SANCO's 7th National Conference was held in late November 2023 in Durban, and it elected Mkhungo as SANCO president; Chris Malematja and Lucky Moloi were elected as his deputies.

Shortly afterwards, Zuma announced the establishment of a new opposition party, the Umkhonto we Sizwe Party (MK Party), which would seek to unseat the ANC in the upcoming general election. In press interviews and in a speech to a January 8 rally, Mkhungo intimated a rejection of the MK Party, affirming SANCO's abiding alliance with the ANC and its support for President Ramaphosa. He condemned what he called "some new tendency by new shenanigans who are using our name to associate with ourselves as if they don't know our originality".

== National government ==
In the May 2024 general election, Mkhungo stood as a candidate for election to the National Assembly, ranked 87th on the ANC's national party list. The Daily Maverick suspected that the ANC had nominated him because of his change of allegiance from Zuma to Ramaphosa in January 2024.

Due to the ANC's electoral decline, he narrowly failed to win a seat. However, he was nonetheless appointed to the national executive: announcing his third cabinet on 30 June 2024, President Ramaphosa named him as Deputy Minister of Defence and Military Veterans. In that portfolio he deputises Minister Angie Motshekga of the ANC and serves alongside Deputy Minister Bantu Holomisa of the opposition United Democratic Movement.
