= Angie Motshekga =

South African politician (born 1955)

The Honourable Angie Motshekga MP
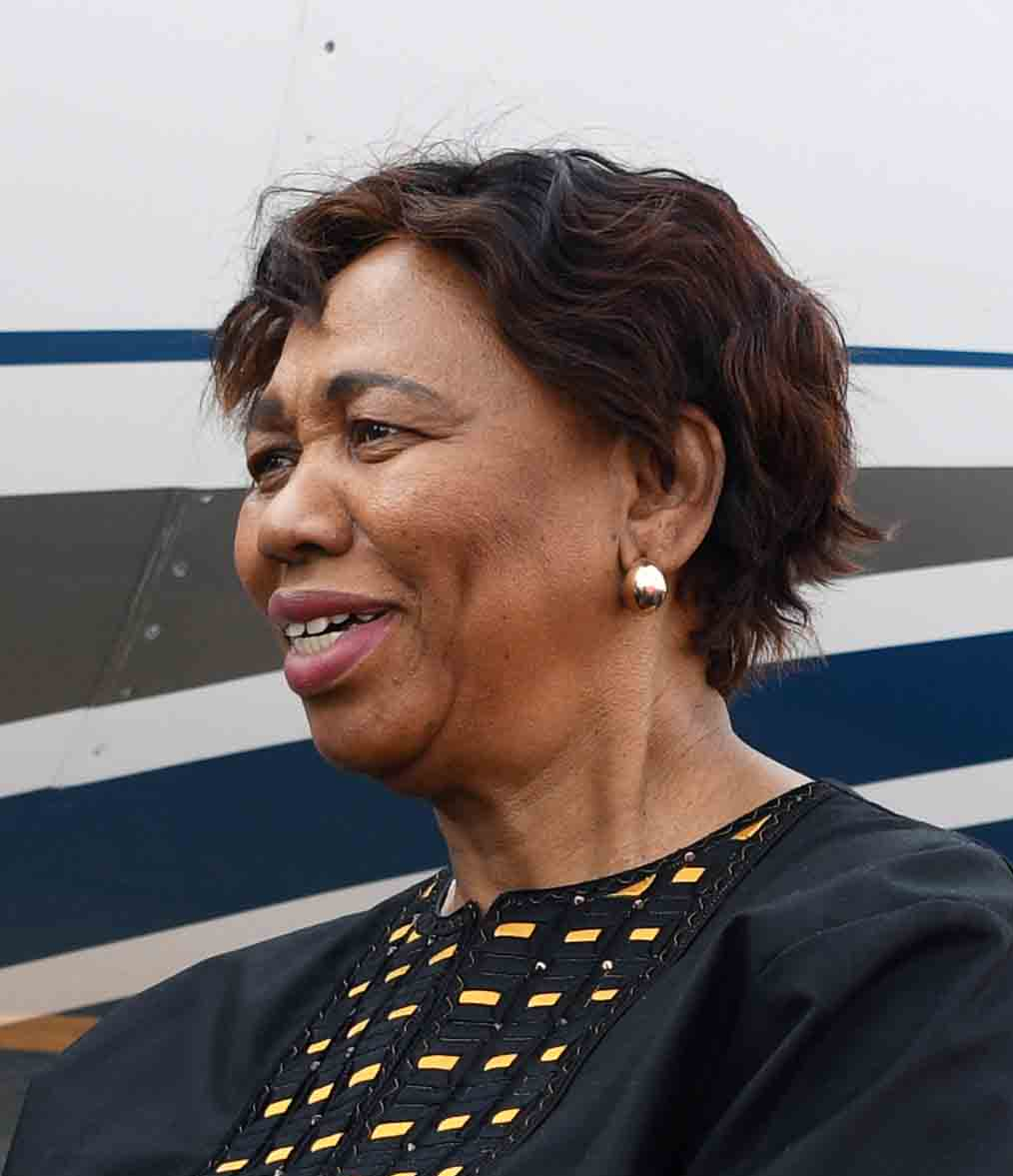
- Motshekga in August 2023

Minister of Defence and Military Veterans
- Incumbent
- Assumed office 3 July 2024
- President: Cyril Ramaphosa
- Deputy: Bantu Holomisa; Richard Mkhungo
- Preceded by: Thandi Modise

Minister of Basic Education
- In office 11 May 2009 – 19 June 2024
- President: Jacob Zuma; Cyril Ramaphosa
- Deputy: Enver Surty; Reginah Mhaule
- Preceded by: Post established
- Succeeded by: Siviwe Gwarube

Member of the National Assembly of South Africa
- Incumbent
- Assumed office 6 May 2009
- Constituency: Gauteng

4th President of the African National Congress Women's League
- In office 2008–2015
- Deputy: Nosiphiwo Mwambi
- Preceded by: Nosiviwe Mapisa-Nqakula
- Succeeded by: Bathabile Dlamini

Deputy Provincial Chairperson of the African National Congress in Gauteng
- In office 2001–2004
- Chairperson: Mbhazima Shilowa
- Preceded by: Paul Mashatile
- Succeeded by: Nomvula Mokonyane

Personal details
- Born: Matsie Angelina Motshekga; 19 June 1955 (age 71) Soweto, Transvaal Province, Union of South Africa
- Citizenship: South Africa
- Party: African National Congress
- Spouse: Mathole Motshekga
- Children: 1
- Education: University of the North (BA); University of the Witwatersrand (BEd; MEd)
- Occupation: Politician; educator; anti-apartheid activist

Matsie Angelina "Angie" Motshekga (born 19 June 1955) is a South African politician and educator who is currently serving as the Minister of Defence and Military Veterans since 3 July 2024. She served as the acting president of the Republic of South Africa from 17 August 2024, while President Cyril Ramaphosa attended the 44th Ordinary Summit of Heads of State and Government of the Southern African Development Community in Harare, Zimbabwe. Motshekga also served as the Minister of Basic Education from May 2009 to 2024. She was previously a Member of the Executive Council in the Gauteng provincial government. Motshekga is a member of the African National Congress. She is a former president of the party's women's league.

== Early life and teaching career ==
Motshekga was born on 19 June 1955 in Soweto, Transvaal Province. She received her primary school education from different schools in Soweto. She matriculated from a boarding school in Matatiele. Motshekga studied at the University of the North, where she obtained a Bachelor of Arts degree in Education. From the University of the Witwatersrand, Motshekga obtained a Bachelor of Educational Science degree and a master's degree.

In 1981, Motshekga was employed as a teacher at Orlando High School. She worked at the school until 1983, when she resigned following her appointment as a lecturer at the Soweto College of Education. Motshekga became a lecturer at the University of the Witwatersrand in 1985. She lectured at the university until 1994.

== Political career ==
During the 1980s, Motshekga was a member of the Soweto Education Crisis Committee that later formed part of the National Education Coordinating Committee. She held membership of the United Democratic Front. She was also a member of the National Education Union of South Africa. Motshekga was active in the Pimville Civic Association.

Motshekga was the National Convenor of Teacher Unity talks that led to the formation of South African Democratic Teachers Union. She was the regional chair of the African National Congress Women's League in the party's former Kyalami region. From 1994 to 1997, she worked as a director in the office of the presidency. She was elected Deputy Provincial Secretary of the ANCWL in 1997.

=== Gauteng provincial government ===
After the 1999 general election, Motshekga was sworn in as a member of the Gauteng Provincial Legislature. She was named the chairperson of the legislature's education committee. In 2000, premier Mbhazima Shilowa appointed her to the Social Development portfolio of the Executive Council. After the 2004 general election, Motshekga returned to the legislature for her second term. Shilowa moved her to the Education portfolio.

Motshekga was elected the national president of the ANC women's league in 2008, defeating the league's secretary-general Bathabile Dlamini. She received 1,826 votes.

=== National government ===
Motshekga was elected to the National Assembly in April 2009. Newly elected president Jacob Zuma unbundled the Education portfolio into two new, separate ministries. Motshekga was appointed Minister of Basic Education. She took office on 11 May 2009. During her first term, textbooks were not delivered to impoverished Limpopo schools between December 2011 and June 2012. She faced calls to resign or be removed, but she remained in the position.

Following the 2014 general election, Zuma retained Motshekga in her position. Bathabile Dlamini unseated her as women's league president in August 2015. In 2017, she ran for ANC national president under the women's league banner without asking for permission. The league criticised Motshekga and later endorsed Nkosazana Dlamini-Zuma for the ANC presidency.

Zuma resigned as South African president in February 2018 and deputy president Cyril Ramaphosa was designated as his successor. Ramaphosa kept Motshekga in her position. In 2019, she became the longest-serving education minister in South African history. She was re-elected as an MP in that year's general election. She remained as minister of basic education.

On 15 February 2021, Motshekga said to pupils at Prospectus High School in Pretoria that an "educated man won't rape". Her comment caused outrage. She responded by saying that her comment was taken out of context.

In 2014, Motshekga claimed that the standard of question papers had increased after an English exam paper riddled with basic spelling and grammar errors was given to learners. In 2022 a mathematics examination paper included a problem that was unsolvable due to a typing error. The error was not picked up before the paper was given and Motshekga's department will decide whether an upward mark adjustment of 1% or 2% is necessary.

She was appointed acting president of the Republic of South Africa on 2 July 2021, as President Cyril Ramaphosa attended the state funeral of Kenneth Kaunda in Zambia.

Following the 2024 South African general election she became the Minister of Defence and Military Veterans.

In January 2025, Motshekga stated that the M23 offensive against South African positions in the Democratic Republic of the Congo, resulting in the death of 13 South African peacekeepers, was only alleviated after President Ramaphosa told the Rwandan government that continued attacks would be interpreted by South Africa as a "declaration of war" by Rwanda.

== International positions ==
Since 2023, Motshekga has been a member of the United Nations High-Level Panel on the Teaching Profession, co-chaired by Kersti Kaljulaid and Paula-Mae Weekes.

== Personal life ==
Motshekga is married to former Premier of Gauteng and former ANC chief whip, Mathole Motshekga. They have children and grandchildren.
