= Department of Basic Education =

South African government department

- Logo of the department

Department overview
- Formed: 2009
- Preceding Department: Department of Education
- Jurisdiction: Government of South Africa
- Headquarters: Sol Plaatje House, Pretoria; 25°44′30″S 28°11′20″E
- Employees: 730 (2009)
- Annual budget: R 38.23 billion (2026/27)
- Ministers responsible: Siviwe Gwarube, Minister of Basic Education; Dr. Makgabo Reginah Mhaule, Deputy Minister of Basic Education
- Department executive: Hubert Mathanzima Mweli, Director-General: Basic Education
- Key document: South African Schools Act, 1996
- Website: www.education.gov.za

The Department of Basic Education (DBE) is one of the departments of the South African government. It oversees primary and secondary education in South Africa. It was created in 2009 after the election of President Jacob Zuma, when the former Department of Education was divided into the Department of Basic Education and the Department of Higher Education and Training.

The political head of the department is the Minister of Basic Education; as of January 2025 this is Siviwe Gwarube. The department oversees all the schools in South Africa, sets up the curriculum for the different grades. DBE works with many stakeholders such as ISASA and NAISA etc. The department is headquartered in Sol Plaatje House, named after the author Sol Plaatje, in Pretoria. This South African ministry has been heavily criticized, especially during the 2012 textbook crisis.

In the 2010 national budget, the department received an appropriation of 6,166.2 million rand, and had 730 employees. In 2019, the department obtained a record matric pass rate of 81.3%.

In 2020, the brand partnered up with eMedia Investments to introduce an educational channel to help learners known as DBE TV on the OpenView platform. Thereafter, they launched a new free-to-air initiative to help out matrics with their exams known as Woza Matrics. In 2020, they had a tough year dealing with the COVID-19 pandemic, where schools had to close its doors and open them again.
