= Max Eiselen =

Werner Willi Max Eiselen (1899–1977) was a South African anthropologist and linguist fluent in a number of African languages. He was an ally and associate of Hendrik Verwoerd, the Minister of Native Affairs from 1950 to 1958 and the Prime Minister of South Africa from 1958 to 1966. He led the Eiselen Commission, an advisory board that investigated native education and formed the basis of the Bantu Education Act of 1953 which moved control of education of South Africa's blacks from missionary schools to local government control. It also made starting a "Bantu" school without permission and registration from the government illegal.

Eiselen was a supporter of apartheid; he believed that it would be better for both white and black South Africans. Eiselen was fluent in a number of African languages and studied a number of South Africa's native tribes. Eiselen's books and works were commonly cited by the National Party and pro-apartheid South Africans, and he is sometimes referred to as an "intellectual architect" of apartheid.

At the request of Hendrik Verwoed he designed the costume worn by the Zulu King Cyprian kaSolomon, at the first celebration of Shaka Day in 1954.

== Biography ==
Werner Willi Max Eiselen was born in the Orange Free State near modern Botshabelo, the son of German missionaries from Berlin. He spent his childhood and adolescence learning and speaking Northern Sotho. Eiselen attained degrees in phonetics and anthropology, obtaining his Bachelors at the University of South Africa, his Masters at the University of Stellenbosch, and his doctorate at the University of Hamburg.
