= Department of Education (South Africa) =

Former government department in South Africa

- List: 10 other official names: Departement van Onderwys (Afrikaans); umNyango wezeFundo (Southern Ndebele); iSebe lezeMfundo (Xhosa); uMnyango Wezemfundo (Zulu); Litiko Letemfundvo (Swazi); Kgoro ya Thuto (Northern Sotho); Lefapha la Thuto (Sotho); Lefapha la Thuto (Tswana); Ndzawulo ya Dyondzo (Tsonga); Muhasho wa Pfunzo (Venda)

Agency overview
- Superseding agencies: Department of Basic Education; Department of Higher Education and Training
- Jurisdiction: Government of South Africa

The Department of Education was one of the departments of the South African government until 2009, when it was divided into the Department of Basic Education and the Department of Higher Education and Training. It oversaw the education and training system of South Africa, including schools and universities. The political head of the department was the Minister of Education, the last of which was Naledi Pandor.
