= Bantu Education Act, 1953 =

South African segregation law

Parliament of South Africa
- Long title: To provide for the transfer of administration and control of native education from the several provincial administrations to the Government of the Union, and for matters incidental thereto.
- Citation: Act No. 47 of 1953
- Enacted by: Parliament of South Africa
- Assented to: 5 October 1953
- Commenced: 1 January 1954
- Administered by: Minister of Native Affairs (South Africa)

Amended by
- Black Education Amendment Act, 1954; Black Education Amendment Act, 1956; Black Education Amendment Act, 1959; Black Education Amendment Act, 1961; Black Education Amendment Act, 1970; Black Education Amendment Act, 1977; Black Education Amendment Act, 1978

Repealed by
- Education and the Training Act of 1979
- Status: Repealed

The Bantu ( Blacks ) Education Act 1953 (Act No. 47 of 1953; later renamed the Black Education Act, 1953) was a South African segregation law of the apartheid system whose main purpose was to limit the educational opportunities of Black children in the country. Its major provision enforced racially-separated educational facilities. Even universities were made "tribal", and all but three missionary schools chose to close down when the government would no longer help to support their schools. Very few authorities continued using their own finances to support education for native Africans. In 1959, that type of education was extended to "non-white" universities and colleges with the Extension of University Education Act, 1959, and the University College of Fort Hare was taken over by the government and degraded to being part of the Bantu education system. It is often argued that the policy of Bantu (African) education was aimed to direct black or non-white youth to the unskilled labour market, and Hendrik Verwoerd, the Minister of Native Affairs, claimed that the aim was to solve South Africa's "ethnic problems" by creating distinct economic and political units for different ethnic groups. A particular fear of the National Party that most likely led to the passing of this legislation was the rising number of children (known as tsotsis) joining urban gangs.

The ruling National Party viewed education as having a rather pivotal position in their goal of eventually separating South Africa from the Bantustans entirely. Verwoerd, the "Architect of Apartheid", stated:

"There is no place for [the Bantu] in the European community above the level of certain forms of labour.... What is the use of teaching the Bantu child mathematics when it cannot use it in practice?"

The Act led to a substantial increase of government funding to the learning institutions of Black Africans, but they did not keep up with the population increase. The law forced institutions to be under the direct control of the state. The National Party now had the power to employ and train teachers as it saw fit.

Black teachers' salaries in 1953 were extremely low and resulted in a dramatic drop of trainee teachers. Only one third of the black teachers were qualified.

The schools reserved for the country's white children were of Western standards. The Act did not stipulate lesser standards of education for non-whites, but it legislated for the establishment of an advisory board and directed the minister to do so. Of the black schools, 30% of had no electricity, 25% had no running water and more than half had no plumbing. Education for Blacks, Indians and Coloureds was substantially cheaper but not free, and the salaries of teachers were set at very low levels.

In the 1970s, the per capita governmental spending on black education was one-tenth of the spending on white.

In the financial year of 1975–76, the state spent R644 on each White student, R189 for each Indian student, R139 for Coloured students, and only R42 for Black students.

== Non-white education prior to 1948 ==
=== Early years ===
During the 1600s, when the Dutch controlled the Dutch Cape Colony, no education system existed for whites or non-white inhabitants. In 1658, Jan van Riebeeck had introduced religious instruction for slaves in the Cape. By the 1700s, the children of Dutch inhabitants could be given a primary education at a few church-run schools or even by travelling teachers, while two slave schools existed for non-whites. In 1799, Johannes van der Kemp from the Church Mission Society established a school for Black pupils near King Williamstown in the territory of the Ngqika peoples.

In 1806, the British occupied the Dutch Cape Colony to prevent it from falling into the hands of the French under Napoleon and named it the Cape Colony. With the arrival of British settlers, the missionary churches soon followed, and along with converting the Black population to their religion, an elementary education of reading and writing was offered. In 1821, the Glasgow Missionary Society set up a school, later to be called Lovedale. It offered evangelical, industrial and academic (entrance exam training for high school and matriculation) training before introducing a full academic curriculum in 1872. In 1841, the Cape Colony set up rules to pay subsidies to mission schools. In 1812, the colonial government offered white children free schooling but only taught in English. Education in Dutch became almost extinct as the Colony attempted to anglicise the Afrikaners with the passing of the Cape Education Act of 1866, with instruction in English, leading to resentment as they saw it as an attack on their culture and values. In 1853, the Cape Colony contributed funds and salaries to around 175 mission schools to educate Black Africans, but as there was no segregation, whites and Coloureds could attend in the same classes, so much so that in 1891 a third of white children in the Colony attended these mission schools. By 1892, ideas of white racial superiority and supremacy developed within the community and new public schools for whites only were developed in the Cape Colony.

The English administrators would continue this policy of anglicisation in the four colonies after the Second Boer War (1899–1902) and prior to the Union of South Africa in 1910, re-enforcing the idea in the Afrikaner that their values, language and culture were under attack.

As for the Boer republics in the Free State and Transvaal, there was no state aid for the education of the black population. In the Orange Free State and Transvaal Republic, white formal schools did not exist to such an extent, with most children relying on the family for a basic informal education and with the black population, nothing existed in these states.[7]

=== Union of South Africa ===
Just prior to the formation of a Union of South Africa in 1909, each province took control of education. By 1910, 90% of the cost of running an African school was paid for by the church-run missions. The government was subsidising white and African pupils on a per capita ratio of R333 to R1. As of 1926, churches became the main source of the provision of African education with 2,702 schools and 215,956 pupils, while the government provided 68 state schools with only 7,710 pupils. The government would eventually allocate R680,000 a year towards Black education, but the allocation was fixed at that amount from 1922 until 1945; further money came from one-fifth of a tax imposed on Black South Africans. White education, on the other hand, increased by 263% between 1910 and 1948.

During the 1920s and 1930s, whether the government was the South African Party, later called the United Party or the National Party, they emphasised protecting white education so that white employment was maintained by restricting black education and skills. In 1922, the curriculum for Black South Africans changed when language training became compulsory in primary schools and practical skills were introduced such as hygiene, handwork, gardening, agriculture, housecraft, and needlework. Whereas in high school, the curriculum was similar in Black and White schools, though there was emphasis in some provinces to replace the academic subjects with agriculture-based topics. In an investigation carried out by the Interdepartmental Committee on Native Education (Welsh Committee) in 1936, it found that 70% of African children who could have been in education weren't, mainly due to crowded schools, poor staffing and the insufficient number of schools. In 1943, the United Party had introduced funding for school meals at black schools. In 1945, Jan Hofmeyr, United Party Minister for Native Affairs, changed the funding model for black education when money would now be issued from the general reserve and independent of black taxation.

The origins of the Apartheids future education policy for all South Africans races were envisioned in 1939 when the Institute for Christian National Education was formed after a congress sponsored by the Federasie van Afrikaanse Kultuurvereniginge (FAK) had met that year. The institute would release a manifesto in 1943, and this outlined how Afrikaners should be educated, emphasising that it should be in their own language and include the children's spiritual and cultural needs. This meant English speaking South Africans would be educated separately, and such an arrangement could be implied for Black, Coloured's and Asian education.

Our Afrikaans schools must not be merely mother tongue schools . . . they must be places where our children are soaked and nourished in the Christian National spiritual and cultural stuff of the volk.... History must be taught in the light of God's decreed plan for the human race . . . God . . . willed separate nations and peoples. Native education should be based on the principles of trusteeship, non-equality and segregation; its aim should be to inculcate the white man's way of life, especially that of the Boer nation, which is the senior trustee.

— Robertson and Whitten 1978:106-107; and Hirson 1979:42

== Bantu education from 1948 ==
Once the National Party came to power in 1948, the ideas envisioned before they gained office were set in motion. In 1949, the Commission on Bantu Education was created, better known as the Eiselen Commission. The aim was to find a new model of Bantu education that fitted into the goals of Apartheid, ensuring white superiority over other races, thus ensuring an inferior education system for future labour and subservience. It was headed by Dr W. W. M. Eiselen, a professor of Social Anthropology at the University of Pretoria, previously a Chief Inspector of Native Education in the Transvaal and later the Secretary of Native Affairs in the civil service. The other members of the commission were all White South Africans who had some involvement in Bantu education.

The following were its terms of reference, setting out to establish a policy and implementation of Bantu education:

1. The formulation of the principles and aims of education for Natives as an independent race, in which their past and present, their inherent racial qualities, their distinctive characteristics and aptitude, and their needs under the ever-changing social conditions are taken into consideration.
2. The extent to which the existing primary, secondary and vocational education system for Natives and training of Native teachers should be modified in respect of the content and form of syllabuses, in order to prepare Natives more effectively for their further occupations.
3. The organisation and administration of the various branches of Native education.
4. The basis on which such education should be financed.
5. Such other aspects of Native education as may be related to the preceding.

Africans who testified at the Eiselen inquiry stated that they did not want a separate system of education specifically designed for them, as they believed it would lead to an inferior education and inferior facilities. Their views were obviously totally ignored.

The Eiselen Commission presented its report to the government in 1951, and the government accepted its recommendations. Its recommendations included the following:

1. The commission proposed that the education system for African's be of a Christian nature, but with an Afrikaner Calvinist interpretation of the Bible which saw Whites as superior, the elect of God, while Africans were regarded as 'hewers of wood and drawers of water'.
2. To make the system of African education more efficient, planning and budgeting would be coordinated by a central government department and missionary schools and provincial education departments would be stripped of their current responsibilities.
3. Education should be used as a plan to develop African society.
4. A better effort should be made at the mass education of the Africans.
5. The literature required to educate the African should be produced by the government in their individual languages and be related to what was needed for their function in life.
6. The funding for African education was described as not being unlimited and would have to cover a wide area of the education system.
7. That pupils should be instructed in their mother tongue, and the report took into account the future Bantustans and their future education policies.

When I am controller of Native Education I will reform it so that the natives will be taught from childhood to realise that equality with Europeans is not for them ... The Bantu must be guided to serve his own community. There is no place for him in the European community above certain forms of labour .... Education must train and teach people in accordance with their opportunities in life-according to the sphere in which they live.

— H.F Verwoerd, Minister of Native Affairs

The churches' mission education system was criticised by the commission for its lack of coordination of educational subjects by church groups, each having different mission statements and goals for black education, as well as religious rivalries. Provincial governments were also criticised for failing to ensure that the black populations were involved in financing and coordinating their children's education. Another criticism of the commission was the inequality of school enrolments across the provinces, with the proportion of black children in education differing considerably. The provincial governments were criticised for their neglect of teacher training, having allowed the church mission to fulfil the need that they should have been managing.

The administration of African education was stripped from the provincial governments and was assumed by the central government under the Department of Native Affairs, Bantu Education Division in 1954. The Division would control all Black primary and secondary schools, teacher training for students with secondary and matric education, vocational education, and night schools. In addition to black government schools, control extended to black pupils at community and farm schools, mine and factory schools, private church schools, and lastly schooling at hospitals. All existing Bantu schools then had to register with the department, which was enacted with the power to prevent or remove their registration. It also became illegal to set up and run, or teach, in a Bantu school without the department's permission.

In August 1953, the bill was read in parliament. Passed into law in October 1953. In April 1954, it was proposed that if churches retained control of their schools, their teaching salary subsidies from the government would be cut in half. But in May 1954, Native Affairs minister H.F. Verwoerd announced that for a limited time only, churches that kept their schools would have the teachers' salary subsidies reduced to 75% of the current allocation. Verwoerd announced that from the 1 January 1955 to 31 March 1956, teachers' subsidies would be cut by 75%, and from April 1956 to 50%, and from the new school year in 1957, 25% of the original subsidy would be paid. In the 1958 school year, there was to be no more subsidy for the church schools.

At the end of 1953, the following Black schools existed in South Africa, which the government could acquire to begin the implementation of the Black education:

	Cape Province	Natal	Orange Free State	Transvaal	Total
Government Schools	38	266	0	5	309
State-aided Schools	2,389	982	604	1,485	5,450
Total	2,427	1,248	604	1,490	5,769

The Department of Native Affairs' Bantu Education division sent out two circulars to the church and mission schools on 2 August 1954, asking the following and wanting a written response:

whether they wish to retain control of existing state-aided schools and hostels either as private unaided institutions, or as aided institutions with the subsidy for teachers’ salaries fixed at seventy-five per cent ... or to relinquish control of these schools and hostels to Bantu community organisations

The government also wanted to know if the churches and missions wanted to sell the schools and hostels to the government, whether they wanted to rent their schools back to them, and retain control of subsidised hostels, or relinquish control to black community organisations.

In reply to the circular of 2 August 1954, the government sent a reply letter on 9 February 1955 to the church and mission schools, thanking them when the majority agreed to the transfer or renting of school buildings. By 1957, funding subsidies to registered mission schools were finally withdrawn. The decision to retain a school had to be considered in relation to the Group Areas Act, which would have excluded a Black school in a White area.

By June 1957, the different categories of Black schools in the native reserves in the country stood at 6,320, with 1,227,017 pupils enrolled:

	Northern Transvaal	Southern Transvaal	Orange Free State	Natal	Transkei	Ciskei	Total
Government Bantu Schools	34	24	18	77	35	24	212
Community Schools	706	406	289	869	1,300	596	4,161
Farm Schools	298	138	512	219	25	213	1,405
Mine or Factory Schools	38	41	14	19	1	15	128
Aided Mission Schools (25% subsidy)	31	37	33	241	39	33	414
Total	1,107	646	866	1,425	1,400	881	6,320

By the end of 1957, there were, on average, 50.2 black pupils per class, while attendance stood at 90.6%, with an average of 177.3 pupils in a school, and with the 62.1% of black schools were running two sessions a day.

In 1958, the responsibility for Black education was transferred from the Department of Native Affairs to a new government department and minister, the Department of Bantu Education.

1964 saw the full implementation of mother-tongue language instruction in Black education up until the end of Standard 6. By the late sixties, the reasons for the appropriation of the black mission schools by the government had failed. In 1949, there was one teacher for 42 pupils, but by 1967 it had worsened to one teacher for 72 pupils. The percentage of pupils in the first four years of education had not moved between 1954 and 1967, 70.9 and 71.23%, showing that very few pupils moved to later years of education. In 1969, in a discussion of black education at a Methodist church of South Africa conference, it concluded that black pupils taught in their mother tongue until the end of standard 6 had impeded their intellectual progress, especially in maths and science, as well as their language skills in English and Afrikaans, which all impacted their ability to progress to high school.

During the sixties, the government's Apartheid policy introduced separate development and set about creating the Black Homelands, and so set about ensuring that the urban black population was not substantially increased via migration from the rural areas, and as well as the use of forced removal of urban Black people to these rural areas.

This policy impacted Black education. There was, therefore, from the mid-60s, never going to be enough schools in urban black areas, with an emphasis on setting up high schools, training schools, and universities in rural black areas, and which urban black pupils could attend by means of boarding. However, primary schools would still be provided for and built in the black urban areas. The new policy, however, did not plan for the increase in enrolment numbers, leaving schools heavily overcrowded. Forced removals of black people from areas considered white to the townships did not help, as schools in those areas were demolished and the influx of new pupils into the townships increased school numbers as the demolished schools were not replaced.

In order to prevent black urban townships from taking control of building new primary schools, white municipalities that controlled these townships were made responsible for providing new schools. High schools in these areas were to be built with money raised by the black community, while half the cost would be matched by the state based on what was raised. This lasted until 1968, when the government made all new school building the responsibility of the controlling white municipalities, if permission was granted, by means of a 20c levy on each household in the black township, though in certain cases they could fund it by other means if permission was granted by the Department of Education. There was also a building formula stating two lower primary classrooms for every 800 families, sixteen higher primary classrooms for every 1,600 families, and ten junior secondary classrooms for every 3,200 families, proving the emphasis was always on lower education.

From 1968, residence permits stating one had the right to live in urban black townships were required to enrol at urban schools. Enforcement of class sizes was also used to drive excess pupils to rural areas. Technical training was also moved to the homelands. Teacher training colleges set up in homelands meant that teachers trained in the latter could not teach in black urban areas due to a lack of additional residential permits and hence a shortage of new teachers in those schools.

=== Black education in the 1970s ===
By 1972, two changes in Bantu education created a situation that would lead to a dramatic explosion of anger and deaths in 1976. The first was organisational and financial mismanagement of the education system, and secondly the effect on black education by the government trying to appease conservative elements within its own party.

In 1972, the government decided to change the number of years for primary and secondary to six years each from the previous eight years of primary school followed by five years of secondary school. This would be implemented from the 1976 school year with those having passed the exam for Standards V and VI at the end of 1975, entering their first year of high school together. The result, in 1976, at the beginning of the first year of high school, the change resulted in the doubling of class sizes in comparison to the previous year. Shortage of classrooms, infrastructure, and teachers didn't help the situation.

The second issue was the language of instruction at secondary schools. In most urban areas, the labour market was dominated by industry and commerce English speaking concerns, which meant it was ideal to be instructed in that language. Prior to 1976, even though Afrikaans was meant to be used to instructed subjects on a 50/50 basis with English, very few Black teachers were fluent in Afrikaans. From 1955, exemptions were applied for and granted by the education department based on not enough teachers or textbooks in Afrikaans. In 1959, the department cracked down, granting exemptions only when teachers lacked the language skills to teach in Afrikaans, but usually granted exemptions based on the dominant language of industry in the school catchment area.

By 1973, in Departmental Circular No. 2, school subjects could be taught either in English or Afrikaans based on the dominant language of the white areas near to the schools. This change led to conflict in the National Party between those of the verligte (enlightened) faction and the verkrampte (rigid) faction under Andries Treurnicht, the latter believing there was a drift away by the party from the original ideals of Apartheid and the Act itself. In 1974, Prime Minister John Vorster, attempting to keep harmony in the party, shifted to right to the verkramptes viewpoint, eventually making Treurnicht, deputy Minister of Black Education. From 1974, the 50/50 rule was enforced with very few exemptions.

In 1974, the Afrikaans Medium Decree was issued by the Minister of Bantu Administration and Development, and Bantu Education, M.C. Botha, making teaching in Afrikaans compulsory at black schools from Standard 5 and onwards. The deadline to implement the decree was 1 January 1975, and Afrikaans was to be used in teaching mathematics, arithmetic, and social studies, while English would now be used to teach general science and practical subjects such as homecraft, needlework, woodwork, metalwork, art, and agricultural science. Subjects to be taught in the mother tongue would be used for religious instruction, music, and physical culture.

Punt Janson, Deputy Minister of Bantu Education, implied the following when justifying the introduction of the decree:

A Black man may be trained to work on a farm or in a factory. He may work for an employer who is either English speaking or Afrikaans speaking and the man who has to give him instructions may be either English speaking or Afrikaans speaking. Why should we now start quarrelling about the medium of instruction among the Black people as well?... No, I have not consulted them and I am not going to consult them. I have consulted the Constitution of the Republic of South Africa …”

— Punt Janson, Deputy Minister of Bantu Education

The South African Constitution of 1961 was used to justify the decree which stated that the official languages in South Africa were English and Afrikaans.

In 1976, with the Afrikaans Medium Decree of 1974 in operation, it forced all black schools to use both Afrikaans and English equally as languages of instruction from the last year of primary school, which led to the Soweto Uprising in which more than 575 people died, at least 134 of them under the age of 18. The students did not wish to be taught in the language of their oppressor, nor did they want to be academically limited in future by it use as opposed to English.

At the time of the Soweto uprising, seventy-five per cent of black children aged 7 to 15 years were in education, making up 3.7 million pupils. But only nine per cent attended secondary school (high school) and of those only 9,009 would matriculate. In just over 20 years since the 1955 implementation of the Act, the government had built 6,700 new schools, doubling the number they had inherited from the mission schools, but enrolment had tripled in those years, reaching 3.7 million black pupils. But the average teacher-student ratio stood at 1 to 60 in black schools, while it was only 1 to 20 in white schools.

Only half of black pupils finished primary school, compared to almost all white pupils and 66% of white pupils attended high school, while only 4% of black pupils attended the latter. It was not uncommon to find pupils older than 20 attending black high schools. The literacy rate between white and black pupils, between 13 and 22 years of age, stood at almost 100% for the former, while for the latter it was around 58%.

When it came to Black teachers' qualifications, numbering 69,000 in 1976, only around ten per cent had the minimum education qualifications required by a white teacher to teach at a white school. When it came to pay, teachers' salaries were 30 to 50% higher at white schools compared to black schools.

In 1976, the Catholic Church decided to integrate its private schools. But in February 1977, the Catholic Church in South Africa suspended enrolments of new black students at its white schools while it negotiated with the government. The church, in violation of laws at the time, was threatened by the government who had the power to remove accreditation of those schools. The two agreed that black pupils currently enrolled could remain while negotiations took place. The Anglicans and Methodists were also considering enrolling black pupils at their white schools.

November 1978, the South African government proposed a new black education bill, to be heard in parliament the following year, that set out to replace the existing Bantu Education Act, 1953. Under the proposed legislation, black education would become compulsory for primary schooling. Teachers' salaries scales were standardised for white and black teachers. There would be provisions for health services in black schools, and a black teachers' advisory council would be allowed. School segregation would be maintained, and a clause would stop white church schools from enrolling black pupils. The funding model for black schools was not changed. Penalties were introduced to prevent the wave of school boycotts that spread throughout black schools after the Soweto Riots in 1976 and included making the boycotts illegal and stating the penalties and fines for protestors and/or imprisoning parents of children who did not attend classes. Black teachers were not forgotten, with fines proposed for disobeying orders, boycotting classes or criticising the government in public. The overall view of the black community was one of condemnation, commenting that the bill failed to address the disparity between black and white education, the lack of funding for the improvement of black education, and the lack of free education; in other words, it maintained segregation and showed no equality. The bill, the Education and the Training Act of 1979, passed into law in 1979 and repealed the Bantu Education Act of 1953. Issues covered were the language of instruction, with the mother tongue used up until standard two at least, and then discretion allowed in choosing English or Afrikaans to instruct the pupils in further years. Other issues addressed in the new bill were waiver of tuition fees, new registration requirements, and the ability of the Ministry of Education to build and maintain schools. The most important issue, changes to the curriculum, was not addressed by the new act.

On 11 November 1980, Ferdinand Hartzenberg, Minister of Education, announced the start of compulsory education for black children in the new year in Mamelodi, Atteridgeville, and Saulsville as well as Krugersdorp, Potchefstroom, and Orkney, with other schools to be phased in over several years. A private research company reported that 64% of black workers lacked a formal education, and in order to address future issues, fixing black education would require the government to spend a considerable amount of money.

On 12 January 1981, compulsory education for black children began with its implementation at 200 schools and 45,000 pupils. Boycotts of classes continued in protest of the inequality between white and black children. The government expected 1.6 million black children to enrol that year for classes.

== Opposition to the Bantu Education Act ==
=== ANC ===
The early leaders of the ANC were, for the most part, educated by the church mission school system. In its formation year of 1912, in its 21 Objects policy document, the ANC advocated for no segregation in education. In 1925, it participated in the formation of the Night School Movement, but it was essentially organised by the Communist Party of South Africa and groups such as the Industrial and Commercial Workers' Union (ICU) and the Transvaal African Teacher's Association. The curriculum emphasised literacy, numeracy, and political education. Distracted by its Defiance Campaign, the ANC was slow off the mark when the Eiselen report was introduced, and the Bantu Education Act enacted. Its National Executive Council (NEC) was forced into a school boycott after infighting between its leaders and its members. A National Education Council was formed and introduced 'cultural clubs' where, through songs, stories, and games, mathematics, geography, history and general knowledge would be taught. It was only in 1955 that the ANC established a position on education when it stated in its Freedom Charter that education would be free, compulsory, and the same for all races. As Albert Luthuli stated, "one of the deep-seated intentions of this [Bantu] type of education is to erase all African leadership."

=== Black teachers ===
Resistance to the new Act began in 1951 and into 1952 by teachers of the Cape African Teacher's Association (CATA), the Transvaal African Teacher's Association (TATA), and the Teachers' League of South Africa (TLSA). The various black teacher associations and unions disagreed with the ANC's boycott of schools campaign, believing it was detrimental to the children who needed educating, but they did advocate for boycotting the new school boards. Teachers' responses to the new Bantu Education Act were one of four choices. There were those who resisted, those who used strategic resistance, those who conformed without accepting the changes, and lastly those who simply embraced the change. The resisters were usually teachers affiliated with the ANC and expressed their feelings inside the school system and outside, organising public meetings and agitating within their communities. The consequences for their agitation could mean firing, while others chose the private teaching sector, and others left the profession and joined the private sector. The strategic resistors stayed in the system and tried to subvert the rules imposed on them, find loopholes, and find ways to improve the curriculum they were supposed to teach. Those who complied were teachers who found themselves without others who wanted to oppose the system, feared losing their jobs, or who were pressurised by school inspectors and principals. The acceptors were those who saw the system as being better than the mission schools, as an improvement in educating their communities, and saw the school inspector as someone who could improve their teaching.

=== Churches ===
When the National Party assumed power after the 1948 election, 97% of schools for black children were run by various churches while, the proportion of black children in education only stood at 9.2%. The various churches met through the Christian Council in South Africa that had been established in 1936 to improve collaboration amongst the various churches in the country. In the council's opposition to Apartheid, there was disagreement between church groups on how to proceed against it, with the English churches quick to establish resolutions when it came to social and political issues, but slow to act on them. On the other hand, the European Protestant churches were hindered by two philosophies when trying to retain their mission schools: one that they established missions in countries and aligned the mission with the language and culture of them, therefore on the racial alignment of its country's politics, and the second, the doctrine of two kingdoms, a spiritual and civil one, with neither having control over each other. There was no opposition to the new act from the Afrikaner churches. They would consult their scriptures for proofs so the new policy could be justified and legitimised.

The following relinquished control of their church or mission schools to the State, renting their schools and buildings:

- African Methodist Episcopal Church
- African Gospel Church Assemblies of God
- African Church
- African Lutheran Mission
- Anglican Church of the Province (except in the case of the Diocese of Johannesburg)
- Baptist Union of South Africa
- Bantu Presbyterian Church
- Church of Scotland
- Free Church of Scotland Mission
- Church of Sweden Mission
- Christian Plymouth Brethren
- Congregational Union of South Africa
- Order of Ethiopia
- Gereformeerde Kerk
- Hermannsburg Missionary Society
- Ibandla le N.E.E.H.
- Ishmaelite Church (Bantu)
- Lutheran Berlin Mission
- London Missionary Society
- Mahon Mission
- Methodist Church
- Nederduits Gereformeede Kerk
- Norwegian Mission Society
- Paris Evangelical Missionary Society
- Pilgrim Holiness Church
- Presbyterian Church of South Africa
- Reformed Baptist Mission
- Salvation Army
- S.A. Baptist Missionary Society
- Scandinavian Independent Baptist Union
- Swedish Alliance Mission
- Swiss Mission in South Africa

The following kept some church or mission schools; rest to the State:

- South African General Mission
- The Free Methodist Mission (Natal)

Following retained church or mission schools with no State aid:

- Catholic Church
- Seventh-Day Adventists

==== Anglican church ====
The Anglican Church of the province of South Africa allowed the bishops in each diocese to decide whether to transfer schools to the government or close them. Most Anglican bishops would lease their school buildings to the government, ensuring black pupils had an education and their teachers kept their jobs, but Bishop Ambrose Reeves objected to the church falling in line with apartheid policies, describing it as 'morally indefensible' and so closed his schools. Unable to finance their mission schools on their own, Archbishop Geoffrey Clayton exclaimed that a rotten system may be better than none, so by the end of 1954 a decision had to be made on the future of the schools. Archbishop Clayton wrote to Verwoerd on 1 April 1955 and informed him that its mission schools in the Southern Transvaal would be closed.

==== Catholic Church ====
In 1948, 850,000 students attended 740 Catholic schools, of which half were in Natal. There was segregation in their schooling with an emphasis on a Liberal arts Catholic Christian education. By 1953, the Catholic Church in South Africa controlled 15 per cent of schools in the country that educated the black population. The National Party feared the Catholic Church's policies of "fatherhood of God and the Brotherhood of man", unity, and equality and called it the Die Roomse gevaar (the Catholic danger) as it conflicted with the government's interpretation of the Bible, of Calvinism, and the Apartheid theme of segregation. The Church opposed the segregated education model recommended by the Eiselen Commission, preferring their black pupils to have unlimited educational potential, and made this known to their followers through conferences and church magazines.

Catholic Bishops met the Native Affairs secretary D.P. de Villiers in March 1954, and were told that the subsidies for teacher salaries would not continue in the long-term. In September 1954, Catholic bishops met Native Affairs Minister H.F. Verwoerd to discuss a church plan to continue their schools and have their teachers' salaries subsidised, but he would not make an exception, which left them with the option of funding the schools themselves or handing over control to the government. After that meeting in September 1954, the Catholic Church decided to keep its schools. This did not go down well with Verwoerd, as he wanted control of all schools, so he announced that from 1 January 1955 to 31 March 1956, subsidies would be cut by 75%, and from April 1956 to 50%, and from the new school year in 1957, a 25% subsidy would be paid. In the 1958 school year, there was to be no subsidy for churches that kept there schools. The church began in January 1955, a nationwide donation campaign to fund its schools, with the campaign officially underway in September 1955. A donation target of £400,000 was set in October 1955, but Catholics and non-Catholics pledged £1,000,000 by the end of November that year. Fundraising would continue until the mid-1960s.

==== Methodist church ====
The Methodist Church of Southern Africa condemned the new black education policy, stating that it would lead to a subordinate role in society and that it was against church doctrine. It also did not want to see its Black pupils go without an education, so handed it over its schools to the government, hoping to continue its religious influence. It did not, however, explore private schools for Black pupils at the time, even when overseas Methodists wanted to assist with funding.

==== Norwegian Lutheran church ====
The Norwegian Lutheran mission established itself in Natal and Zululand from the 1840s onwards and established the Lutheran Zulu Church. The Norwegian Mission Society (NMS) ran two types of schools, subsidised and non-subsidised, with different requirements, procedures, and funding, though all followed the provincial government curriculum. In 1948 it had 64 subsidised schools out of 110 it ran, with 6,024 pupils, with strict policies concerning pupil numbers and teachers' levels of education. The non-subsidised schools had only four early years of education, lower teacher education levels and poorer wages, with only 1,159 pupils, funded by the local community and church members. The NMS also ran three night schools in cities.

In collaboration with other Lutheran organisations such as the Berlin Missionary Society, the Church of Swedish Mission (CMS), the American Lutheran Mission (ALM), and the Hermannsburg Mission (HMS), with whom the NMS formed the Lutheran Missions in Natal (CLM), assisted in running a teacher training college called Umpumulo, established by the NMS in 1893, and the Zulu Lutheran High School in 1938 that moved to Eshowe in 1948.

The Norwegian Lutheran's education mission's ability to confront the government's new education bill was, however, stymied by Section 14 of the 1933 NMS missionary mandate, which stated:

Missionaries must restrain from all forms of intervention in the relevant country’s politics and conflicts.

In August 1954, the Norwegian mission received two circulars from the Department of Native Affairs' education division with the first concerned about transferring its subsidised schools to the black communities. The second suggested options for the Umpumulo teacher training college, hostels, and the high school in Eshowe. In their reply to the government, the mission stated its disagreement with the Bantu Education Act, but stated that without state finances they could not run the schools themselves, and so, not wanting to deprive their black pupils of an education, would transfer control of the schools to black communities, but wanted to maintain spiritual instruction, and would retain ownership and rent the school facilities to the state. The missions' non-subsidised schools ran until 1961, as they were limited by the government to educating up until Standard 2 only, with further education continued at state schools if the pupils could pass an entry test to Standard 3.

In 1955, the NMS had reduced its number of schools to 36 with 1,062 pupils. In 1956, the high school and teacher training college were now managed by the government, while the hostels remained under the church's control. But by 1961, the government took over management of the hostels and in 1962, Umpumulo became a theological seminary while the high school was sold to the state.

=== South African Institute of Race Relations ===
The South African Institute of Race Relations organised a conference of 159 groups from non-religious and religious organisations in South Africa in July 1952 to discuss the Eiselen Commission's report and state its opinion on the future of black education. The Institute concluded that the result of Apartheid's policies would be a separate black development compared to other races. It did not believe education could be used to develop a society while ignoring individual development, and in addition to wishing that churches continue their involvement in education, stated that the provincial governments should control black education from money provided from state revenue and not financed only by taxes collected from the black communities. While it welcomed compulsory education for black children, it had serious doubts that the government would be able to implement it.

== Implementation of the new Black education policy ==
=== Enrolments ===
The objective of the government had always been to increase enrollment of African students in education compared to the mission schools. But their emphasis was to concentrate mainly on primary education and neglected secondary education enrollment. Their objective was to ensure as many Black children as possible received a basic level of education and, in future, as semi-skilled workers. Emphasis was placed on the first four years of education with minimal numeracy and literacy in their own language and some knowledge of English and Afrikaans.

Primary pupils accounted for 95.59 per cent of total African enrolments in education in 1954; 95.50 per cent in 1968, and 93.99 per cent in 1974. Secondary school enrolments (high school) accounted for only 3.47 per cent of the total Africans in education in 1954, 4.12 per cent in 1968, and 6.00 per cent in 1974. The other issue was that Black education was not made compulsory. From 1960 to 1970, the percentage of young Africans not in education dropped from 62.5% to 51.8%. But retention of Africans in education was poor, and a considerable number of pupils left school early, with 443,030 students starting school in 1963, 197,853 remaining in 1967, and in 1970, 645,285 started school, and in 1974, only 343,301 remained.

With the poor retention rates in primary schools, the damage continued with poor enrolment in secondary school, with factors such as an inferior curriculum, funding, and the quality of teaching impacting performance, resulting in poor matriculation results at the end of high school, with only 70% of the candidates taking their final examinations passing. In 1972, 7,348 Africans attended university compared to 105,671 students of all races, or seven per cent, with 3,583 full-time at universities while 3,765 were enrolled at the University of South Africa, a correspondence university.

=== Schools ===
The department controlled who was appointed to teach at schools, allocated the funding for schools, and was involved in setting up each school's boards and parents' committees. When the new model of education began, there were not enough schools for the influx of pupils. The government came up with a solution. They split the school day into two sessions, and pupils were enrolled in either a morning session or an afternoon session and reduced the instruction to three hours. This resulted in under-instruction and underpaid and overworked teachers. By 1958, 70 per cent of primary schools now had double teaching sessions.

Another issue that schools constantly suffered from was a poor teacher to pupil ratio, resulting in very large classes. In 1955, there was one teacher for 45.3 pupils and in 1957, the ratio had risen to one teacher to over 50 pupils. By 1960, it had risen to one teacher for 54.7 pupils.

Maintenance and caretaking costs at black schools were not paid by the state and were to be paid by the community. Funding used to feed black pupils' school meals, introduced in 1943, was reduced by the government. It reduced expenditure on school feeding from R893,000 in 1955 to R50,000 in 1964

In the mid-50s and 1960s, new schools for lower primary, the first four years, were funded by white municipalities or by government funding, while the building of higher primary and high schools were expected to be half-funded by school boards or older existing buildings were used instead.

The Bantu Education Department also sought to control funds received by school boards from private companies, with any amounts donated over R50 were managed by the department. By 1971, no black school board could accept donations or funds for schools from private companies. By the 1970s, corporate firms and newspaper groups started to donate or raise money, getting around the loophole by donating to the white municipalities or individuals rather than schools so classrooms could be built.

=== Teachers ===
In the first four grades of primary school, the governments policy was that teachers were to be female, and if there were male teachers in those grades, they would be paid the same as a female teacher. Any salary over and above the government level would have to be supplemented by the community themselves. School boards could raise funds and dismiss teachers, and while they were supposed to be independent, their choice of members were subject to government oversight as well as decisions made by the board. All teachers were paid by the government, on contracts with three months' or less notice of termination.

=== Teacher training ===
Prior to the introduction of the Act, there were forty teacher training colleges in South Africa for black teachers, most of them run by the church mission system. African teacher training colleges were also to be placed under the control of the Department of Native Affairs, which set the entry requirements and training standards. Black teachers who qualified overseas were denied jobs based on the fact that they were not South African-trained.

The government sought to increase the number of teachers. In 1954, there were 6,863 trainee teachers, while in 1972, the figure had only risen to 10,268, and teacher numbers could not keep up with the increase in the number of pupils enrolling each year. One of the main problems was that the quality of potential teaching staff was that a large proportion, 86.97%, had enrolled at their teacher training schools without high school matriculation. During the sixties, black teachers were beginning to enter the system without professional qualifications and with some, their own schooling ranged from Standard 6 to Matric. The proportion of teachers with university degrees dropped as well.

The other issue was salaries. The government deliberately underpaid teachers, with figures for 1972 showing that their average salary was about 45% of White teachers' wages, when compared to the workload. Teachers with good tertiary qualifications sought work in the private sector doing work other than teaching, where pay was better.

=== Curriculum ===
Government schooling for the Bantu in the middle 1950s would be conducted by teachers in the pupils mother-tongue for the first four years before being commonly instructed in English for the rest of primary school, but by the 1960s, all primary school instruction was given in their mother language. At secondary schools (high school), instruction would continue in the mother tongues for some levels, and English and Afrikaans speech taught as a subject. Not being taught in English served the purpose of restricting access to certain terminology in educational works, unable to be translated into black languages; this impeded the ability to gain knowledge needed to progress further after schooling in higher education. The education in a mother-tongue fitted the narrative of Apartheid, separating black tribal groups for assimilation into individual Bantustans as well as protecting "poor whites" and the white working class via job reservation, ensuring they would not be required to do menial work.

=== Funding Black education ===
With the introduction of the Bantu Education Act and the government assuming control of Black education, funding the amount from general revenue was fixed at R13 million from 1955 until 1972, and any additional money for education would be funded from a share of taxation from Black South Africans. From 1972 onwards, the government decided that black education would be financed from consolidated revenue funds and the proportion of black taxation would no longer be used, and so funding per pupil increase yearly.

The table outlines the amount spent on education for black pupils versus what was spent on white pupils:

Year	Whites (Amount in Rands per pupil)	Africans (Amount in Rands per pupil)
1930	R45,20	R4.27
1935	R47.72	R3.85
1940	R51.42	R4.43
1945	R76.58	R7.78
1953	R127.84	R17.08
1960	R144.57	R12.46
1968	R228.00	R14.48
1972	R461.00	R25.31
1973	R486.00	R28.56

== Amendments ==
The Act was amended several times. Firstly in 1956, then 1958, 1959, and 1961 before being replaced with a new piece of legislation.

== Repealed ==
The Act was repealed in 1979 by the Education and the Training Act of 1979, which continued the system of racially segregated education but also eliminated both the discrimination in tuition fees and the segregated Department of Bantu Education and allowed both the use of native tongue education until the fourth grade and limited the attendance of black pupils at private white schools.

== Other race-based education legislation ==
Following the passing of the education bill in 1953 and its implementation from 1955, a Commission on Coloured Education was established in 1953, headed by De Vos Malan. Its recommendations resulted in the passing of the Coloured Persons Education Act in 1963, and the model was introduced in 1964. The Indian Education Act was passed by Parliament in 1965, and the Indian education model was introduced in 1966. White education finally had a centralised education system, managed by a government department, when the National Education Policy Act was passed in 1967. Higher education changes were implemented for university tuition for Africans when the Extension of University Education Act, 1959 and the University College of Fort Hare Transfer Act, 1959, set out to exclude Blacks from White universities. Where a degree was not covered by a Black university, permission could be sought from the government to attend a white university that offered it.
