= EME =

EME may refer to:

== Companies and organizations ==
- Edison Mission Energy, a defunct American power company
- Emcor, an American construction company
- College of Electrical and Mechanical Engineering, a constituent college of National University of Sciences and Technology, Pakistan
- Corps of Royal Canadian Electrical and Mechanical Engineers, of the Canadian Forces
- Indian Army Corps of EME, of Electronics and Mechanical Engineers
- Pakistan Army Corps of Electrical and Mechanical Engineering

== Science ==
- ECB-mask-ECB, a block cipher mode of operation used for disk encryption
- EME (psychedelic), a drug
- Early myoclonic encephalopathy
- Earth–Moon–Earth communication
- Eigenmode expansion
- Electromagnetic environment
- Electromembrane extraction
- Early Medieval Europe (journal)
- Encrypted Media Extensions

== Language ==
- Early Modern English, a phase of the English language.

== Other ==
- EME Temple, in Gujarat, India
- Elmore railway station, Australia
- Encrypted Media Extensions, a W3C specification
- Exempted Micro Enterprises
