= 2021 South African unrest =

Riots after Jacob Zuma's imprisonment, 9 to 18 July 2021

2021 South African Riots
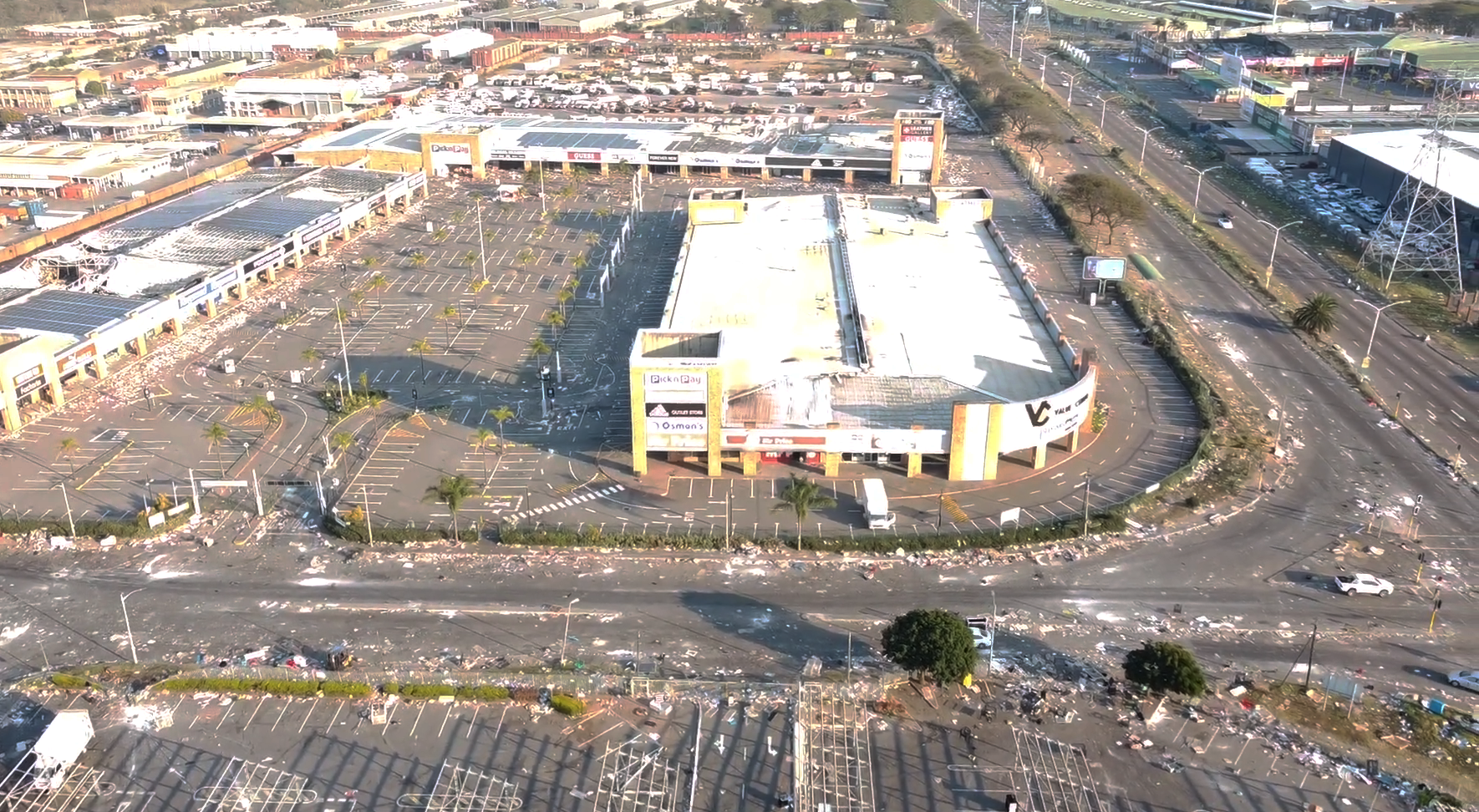
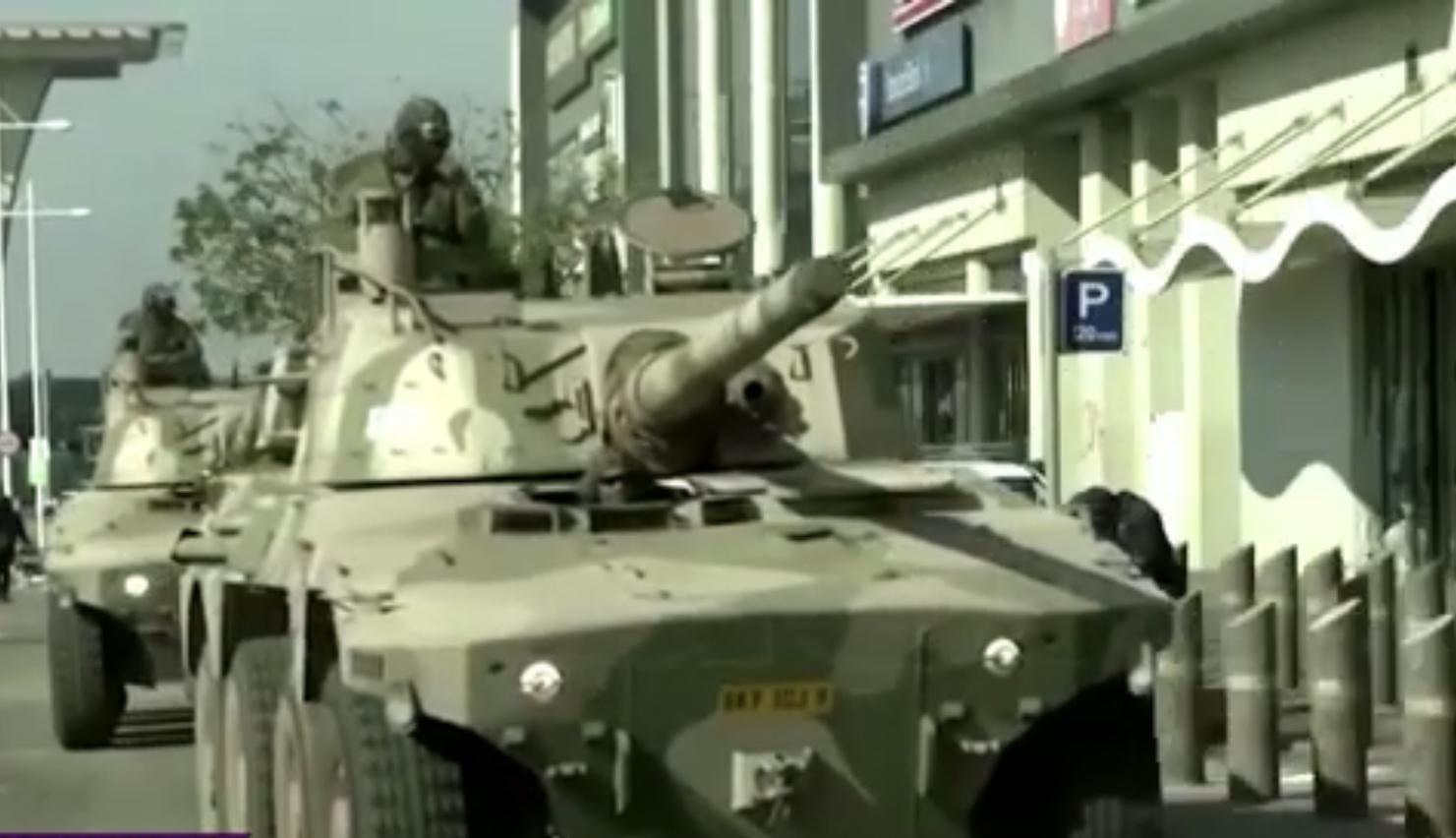
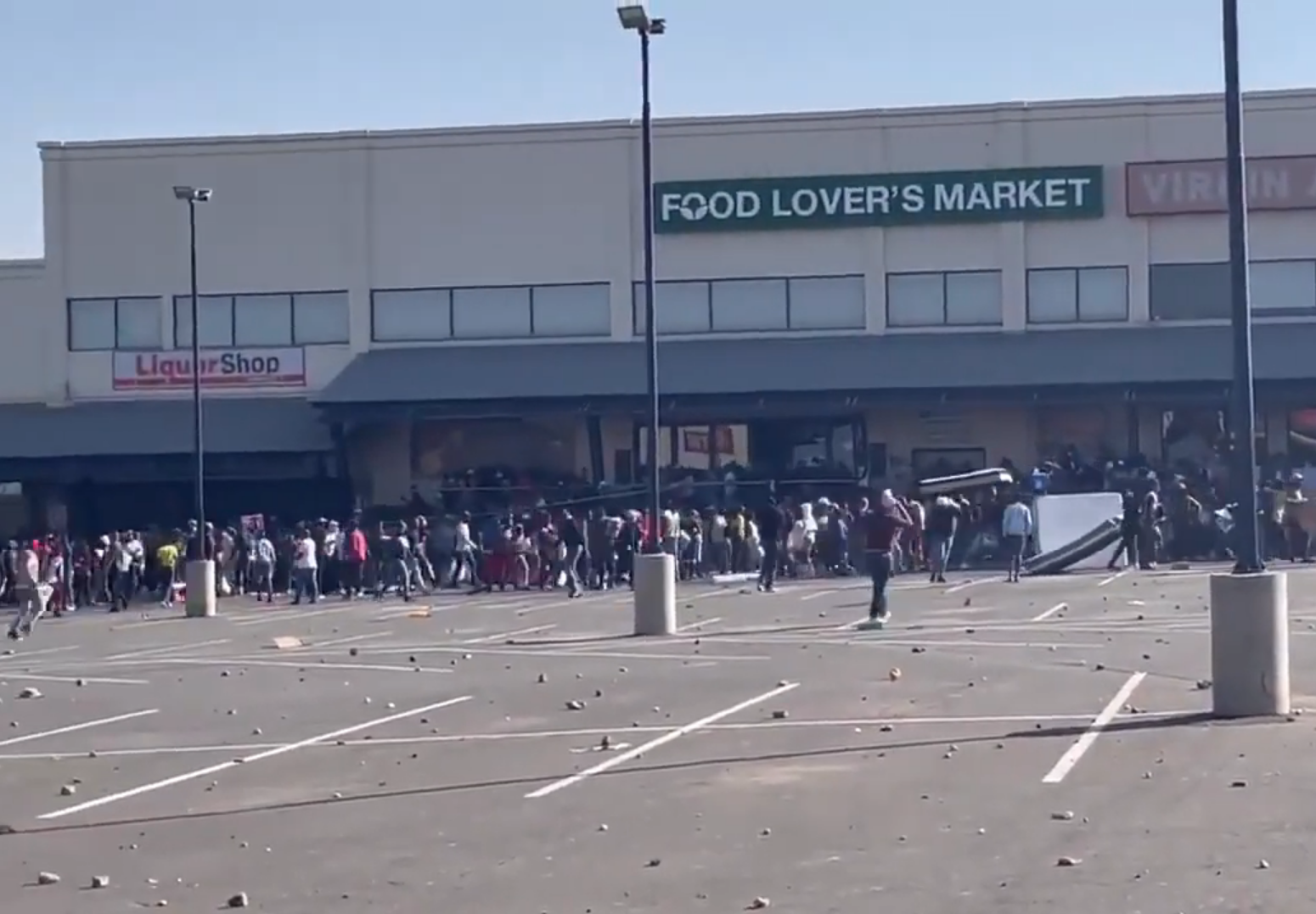
- An aerial view of the aftermath of looting from the unrest in Springfield, Durban, KwaZulu-Natal SANDF deployment in South Africa during the 2021 South African unrest Looting during the unrest at a local mall in Dlamini, Soweto, Gauteng Province
- Date: 9 – 18 July 2021 (1 week and 1 day)
- Location: South Africa: Mostly within the Gauteng and KwaZulu-Natal provinces
- Caused by: Imprisonment of former President of South Africa Jacob Zuma; Economic inequality; Criminality; Unemployment
- Goals: Release of Jacob Zuma from prison; Social justice (factions)
- Methods: Arson; Civil disobedience; Demonstrations; Looting; Internet activism
- Result: Widespread looting and riots; Racial tensions; Deployment of the South African National Defence Force; Economic distress; Civilian unrest; COVID-19 vaccination crisis

Parties
Public: Pro-Jacob Zuma protesters; Criminal elements; Community members, including looters	Government of South Africa: South African National Defence Force; South African Police Service; Provincial Government: KwaZulu-Natal Provincial Government; Gauteng Provincial Government; Public: Private security guards; Community members; Neighbourhood watch groups; Vigilante groups; Business owners; Taxi associations

Lead figures
No centralized leadership	Cyril Ramaphosa (South Africa) David Mabuza (South Africa) Bheki Cele (South Africa) Nosiviwe Mapisa-Nqakula (South Africa) Sihle Zikalala (South Africa) David Makhura

Casualties
- Deaths: 354
- Arrested: 5,500

The 2021 South African unrest, also known as the July 2021 riots, the Zuma unrest or Zuma riots, was a wave of civil unrest that occurred in South Africa's KwaZulu-Natal and Gauteng provinces from 9 to 18 July 2021, sparked by the imprisonment of former President Jacob Zuma for contempt of court. Resulting protests against the incarceration triggered wider rioting and looting, much of it said to be undertaken by people not in support of Zuma and fuelled by job layoffs and economic inequality worsened by the COVID-19 pandemic policies. The unrest began in the province of KwaZulu-Natal on the evening of 9 July, and spread to the province of Gauteng on the evening of 11 July, and was the worst episode of violence the country experienced since the end of Apartheid.

Zuma was taken into custody after declining to testify at the Zondo Commission, an inquiry into allegations of corruption during his term as president from 2009 to 2018. The Constitutional Court reserved judgment on Zuma's application to rescind his sentence on 12 July 2021. The South African government reported that 354 people had died in the riots. As of 12 August 2022, 5,500 people had been arrested, in connection with the unrest.

== Background ==
=== Economy ===
More than half of South Africa's population lives in poverty, with an unemployment rate of 32%. According to the World Bank, income inequality has increased since 1994 in South Africa, rendering it the most unequal country in the world.

=== Jacob Zuma's legal battle ===
Former South African president Jacob Zuma was charged with corruption in March 2018, in connection with the South African Arms Deal, known as the "Strategic Defence Package" worth R30 billion (equal to US$2.5 billion or £2 billion). The legal battle has continued since, with Zuma's legal team attempting to have the charges dismissed and appealing for more time to prepare. During the trial proceedings, Zuma was repeatedly absent from the court, citing medical reasons and lack of funds.

=== Imprisonment of Jacob Zuma ===
On 29 June 2021, Zuma was sentenced to 15 months in prison for contempt of court, after he refused to appear at a commission his government appointed to investigate alleged corruption during his time in office, and engaged in what the judges characterised as a "politically motivated smear campaign" against the country's judiciary. The case ultimately proceeded to the Constitutional Court. He was given until the end of 4 July to hand himself in, after which the South African Police Service would be obliged to arrest him. On 3 July, the court agreed to hear his application on 12 July. If Zuma refused to surrender by 4 July, the police were given until 7 July to arrest him. Supporters had gathered near his home with weapons to prevent his arrest but he handed himself over to the police on 7 July, and was jailed at the Estcourt Correctional Centre.

On 8 July 2021, the Minister of Justice and Correctional Services Ronald Lamola announced that Zuma would be eligible for parole upon serving a quarter of his 15-month sentence. Zuma challenged his detention on 9 July in the Pietermaritzburg High Court on the grounds of health but this was rejected. His imprisonment led to violent protests by his supporters in KwaZulu-Natal, which quickly developed into widespread looting in KwaZulu-Natal and Gauteng.

== Civil disorder ==
"According to the Minister of Police, the planned violence was intended to make the entire country ungovernable, but it had gained the most traction in the KwaZulu-Natal and Gauteng provinces, which had significant numbers of outspoken individuals and groups opposing the sentencing and incarceration of former President Zuma."

— https://www.thepresidency.gov.za/sites/default/files/2022-05/Report%20of%20the%20Expert%20Panel%20into%20the%20July%202021%20Civil%20Unrest.pdf] (29 November 2021), pg 52. The Presidency of South Africa

=== Riots and looting ===
On 9 July 2021, the same day Pietermaritzburg High Court upheld his conviction and prison sentence, the unrest began. Public violence, burglary, and malicious damage to property were reported in parts of KwaZulu-Natal, with at least 28 people being arrested and a highway being blocked. The riots continued on the evening of 11 July, when multiple news sources indicated reports of gunshots and explosions heard at local malls and residential areas.

The violence quickly escalated, and by the morning of 12 July, multiple companies and malls were forced to close following widespread looting and violence. An incident occurred at Southgate Spar, a supermarket near a township in Pietermaritzburg, as an unnamed 15-year-old boy was shot in the chest with a rubber bullet fired by police in the midst of the unrest and later succumbed to his wounds. The incident played a part in escalating the unrest.

354 people died due to the unrest according to the South African government, while 5,500 were arrested by 12 August 2022. In KwaZula-Natal, 2,763 people had been arrested by 24 July 2021.

=== Racial tensions ===
In the Indian-majority township of Phoenix, KwaZulu-Natal, some of the residents had armed themselves to fight off looters, due to the absence of police forces. This in turn stoked racial tensions between black and Indian South African citizens, with several racially motivated attacks reported to have taken place. India's Minister of External Affairs S. Jaishankar raised the issue of the safety of people of Indian origin with the South African Minister of International Relations and Cooperation Naledi Pandor, who assured him that the government was trying its best to restore law and order.

Police Minister Bheki Cele stated that the main motive behind the Phoenix riots was criminal and that racial issues were secondary. He confirmed that 20 people had died in the town in the unrest. He also warned people against falling for fake news designed to increase racial tensions. An investigation by the Daily Maverick newspaper found that vigilantes in Phoenix and surrounding areas had targeted suspected looters and even ordinary civilians, committing brutal acts on them. Then-KwaZulu-Natal Premier Sihle Zikalala stated that 38 people had been killed by vigilantes in Phoenix, Inanda and Verulam. Racial tensions in the area, it was discovered, were stoked by false rumours of a massacre of between 350 and 500 black people, allegedly by Indians in Phoenix. The newspaper also reported that some incidents of murders of both black people and Indians under investigation were believed by the police to have credible evidence of racial motivations. These incidents of violence were linked by some commentators to memories of the Durban riots in 1949.

On 3 August, Cele stated that the rioting in Phoenix did have a partially racial nature. He explained that on 12 July, some residents had set up roadblocks and started patrolling the streets after rioting in Durban. Some of the vigilantes had started racially profiling people, mainly black people, and restricting their entry. When one truck containing looted items was stopped, the four occupants, who were black citizens, fired at the vigilantes, who shot back and killed one of them. Cele stated that the police believes this led to further violence between the different communities. Many vehicles were stopped and looted at the roadblocks, while the passengers were also assaulted.

Incidents of xenophobic attacks targeting foreign truck drivers and foreigners were also reported during the unrest.

=== Incitement ===
Police Minister Bheki Cele stated that the security cluster was looking at ten to twelve people who were fueling the riots through social media. According to State Security Minister Ayanda Dlodlo, they are investigating information as to whether senior former agents in the intelligence agency and senior ANC members aligned to former president Jacob Zuma are responsible for igniting the recent violence in KwaZulu-Natal and Gauteng.

Jacob Zuma's daughter, Duduzile Zuma-Sambudla, is allegedly among those who encouraged the looting and violence in order to secure the release of her father as an unverified Twitter account under her name encouraged people to protest.

In November 2021 the expert panel into the July 2021 civil unrest concluded that the riots were at least to some extent organized rather than spontaneous:

"The submissions we received point to elements of organisation behind the looting of the malls, combined with opportunistic looting. [...]. It is clear that the planners wanted the looting to look like they were spontaneous; a phenomenon that we have coined 'organised spontaneity'."

=== State response ===
Initially, the South African Police Service (SAPS) was deployed in the Nkandla district to control the number of protests in the area.

Over the weekend, as the South African Police Service (SAPS) battled to contain the large-scale looting and damage to infrastructure, pressure mounted on government to deploy the army.

On the morning of Monday, 12 July 2021, the South African National Defence Force (SANDF) was deployed in Gauteng and KwaZulu-Natal, as part of Operation Prosper.

On 12 July 2021, president Cyril Ramaphosa addressed the riots, saying that the acts of public violence have been "rarely seen" in democratic South Africa. Ramaphosa referred to the riots as opportunistic acts of violence, citing the lack of grievance, nor any political cause, that can justify the destruction by the protestors. He highlighted the Constitution of South Africa, which guarantees the rights of everyone to express themselves, but stated that the victims of the violence unfolding are the workers, truck drivers, business owners, and the parents of those who have died and have all done nothing wrong. He went on to discuss the impact of the riots on the COVID-19 vaccine rollout, stating that it has been drastically disrupted after prior setbacks. He also noted how the economy of the country would face further challenges due to food and medication insecurity resulting from the riots. The deployment of SANDF to assist with ending the unrest was also discussed by him.

On the same day, the Constitutional Court of South Africa reserved its previous judgment and rejected Zuma's bid to rescind his prison sentence. As a result of the decision, Zuma is required to remain imprisoned.

On 14 July 2021, the Minister of Defence and Military Veterans Nosiviwe Mapisa-Nqakula said that the SANDF had increased the deployed number of troops to 25,000.

Following the unrest, President Ramaphosa announced on 18 July that the government would explore introducing a basic income grant.

=== Public response ===
As a result of the state response failing to quell the unrest, private security companies, taxi drivers, armed civilians and vigilante groups had taken on law enforcement duties by protecting businesses and communities from rioting and looting. Petrol stations, shopping malls, supermarkets and communication infrastructure were guarded by some members of the public, often with the support of business owners and corporations. Vigilante groups protecting suburbs and businesses worked in an organised manner to arrest looters and to hand them over to authorities, albeit in an often violent manner.

== Impact ==
=== Effects on logistical networks ===
Protest effects on road networks Legend: Road closure Road protest

==== Roads ====
Road closures on both the N3 and N2 have affected the transportation of goods from the east coast into provinces in the north. This affects the transportation of goods to landlocked countries in Africa including Botswana, Zimbabwe and Zambia.

Multiple logistics and fuel companies declared forced temporary closure of their operations in KZN, citing fears of continued looting, hijackings, truck burnings, and social unrest that could further impact business operations, adding to more costs sustained from the looting and damage to property. During the riots there were reports of xenophobic attacks targeting foreign truck drivers along the N3.

The unrest coincided with the worst of the violence during the 2021 Cape Town taxi conflict which was believed to be unrelated to the events in KwaZulu-Natal and Gauteng.

==== Container ports ====
The container ports of Richards Bay and Durban ceased operations. Containers in the port of Durban were plundered. After several attacks on trucks, the N3 Highway, which links port Durban with Johannesburg, was closed on 10 July.

The unrest coincided with the Transnet ransomware attack that also contributed to shutting down the Durban container port. The ransomware attack is believed to have been unrelated to the unrest.

==== Rail ====
State-owned logistics operator Transnet declared force majeure on 14 July on a rail line linking Johannesburg to the coast.

=== Supply chain disruptions ===
==== Food shortages ====
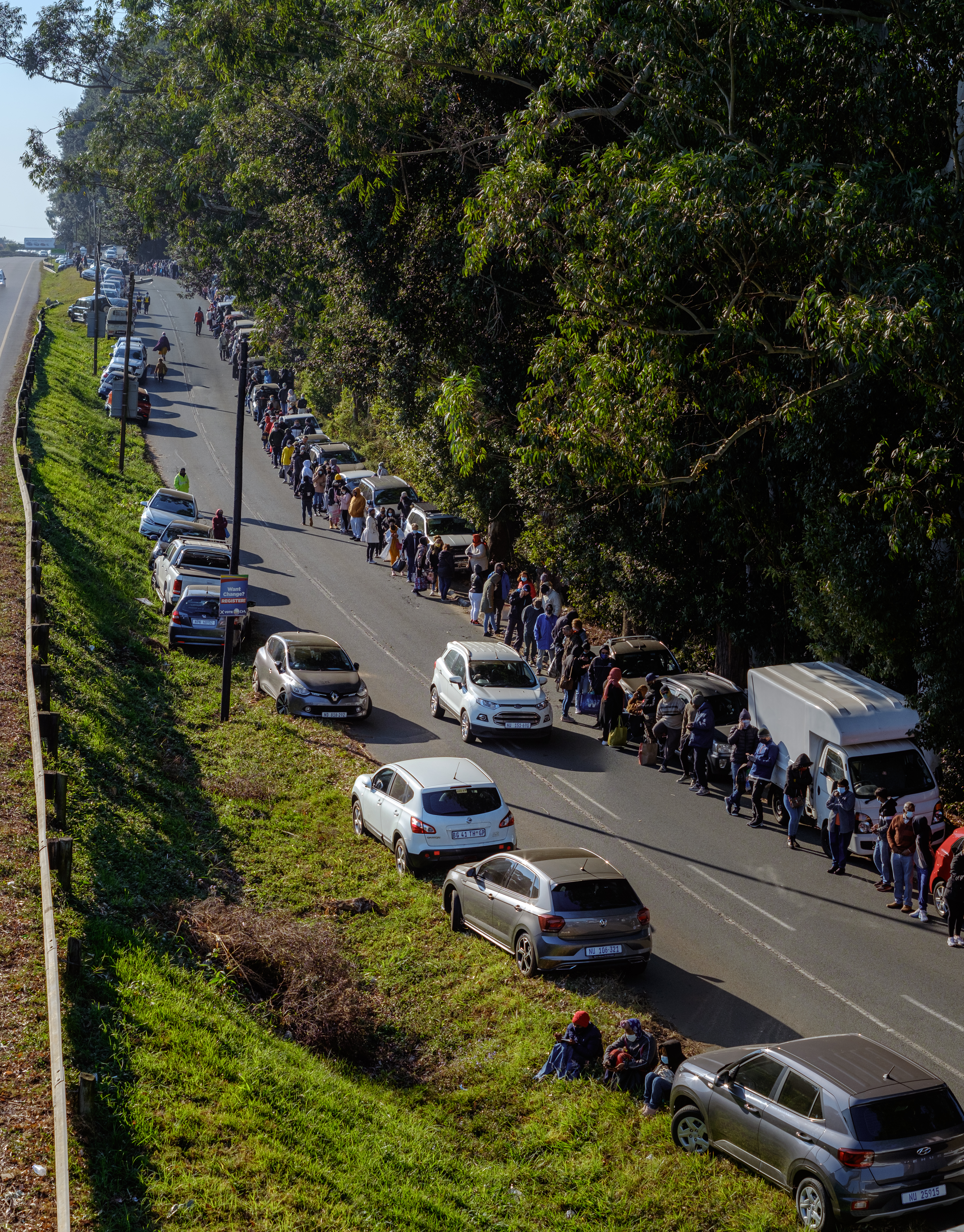
A surviving grocery store's queue reaches 800m long shortly after reopening.

On 12 July 2021, the Consumer Goods Council of South Africa warned that widespread looting, destruction and closures would lead to food shortages across the country. By 14 July 2021, damage to transport infrastructure had caused food shortages, leading to queues outside grocery stores, and prevented harvesting and distribution of fresh produce. On 15 July 2021, the largest food manufacturer in South Africa, Tiger Brands, suspended bakery operations in affected areas due to damaged infrastructure and facilities while also noting that it had suffered a loss of stock in excess of R150 million. Some stores and petrol stations in Johannesburg noted that their shelves were getting emptied and supplies were dwindling due to panic buying. A Durban journalist noted that while bread had returned to their area, people were paying significantly more for it and were queueing for many hours at a time. Stores were also placing limits on how much customers could buy while community-run barricades reportedly turned people away if they could not prove they were from those communities.

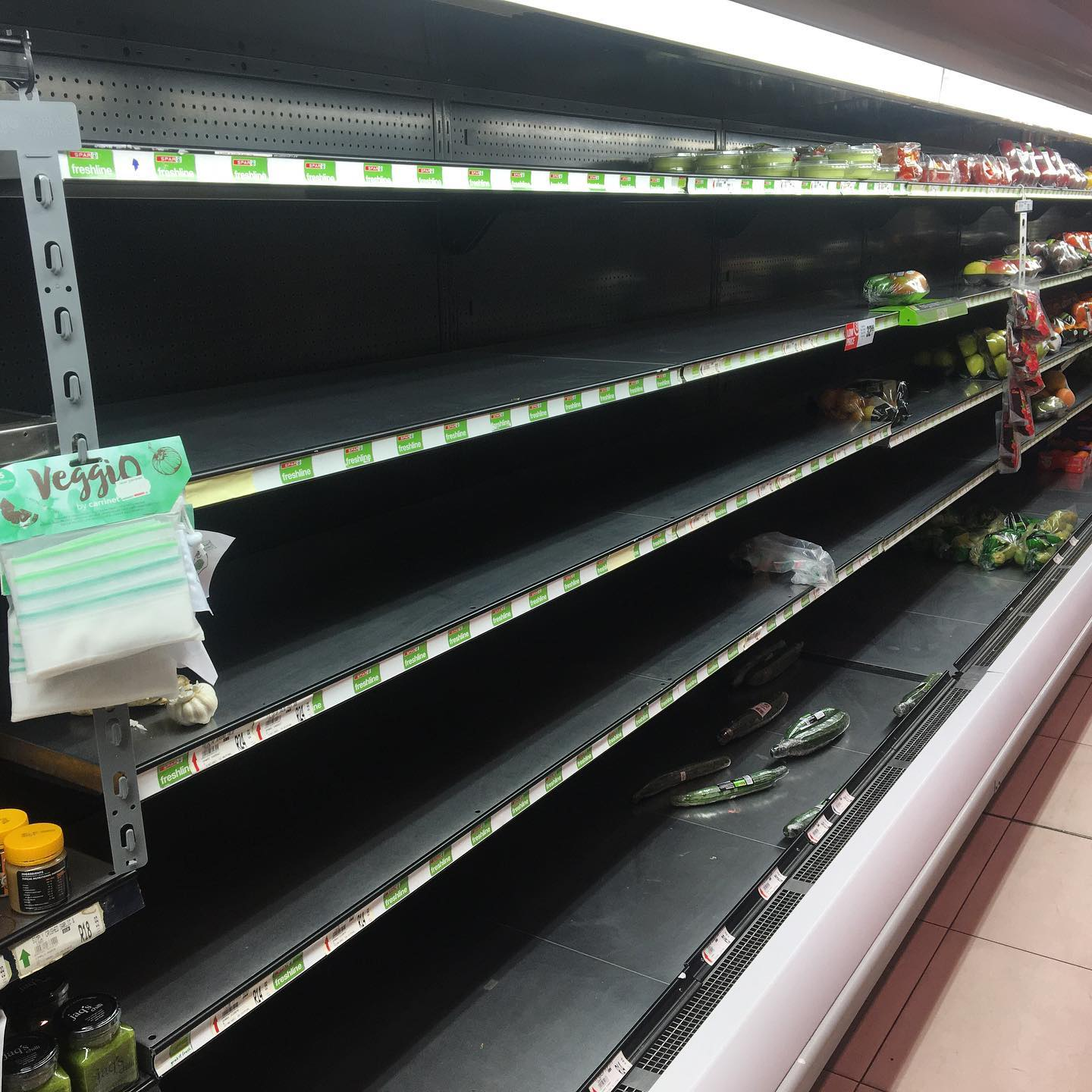
Empty shelves in a grocery store due to panic buying during the 2021 South African unrest

==== Fuel shortages ====
The Sapref oil refinery, which is a joint venture between Shell and BP, is the largest oil refinery in Sub Saharan Africa. It supplies approximately one third of South Africa's fuel needs and its operations were suspended due to a declaration of force majeure. On 15 July 2021, the Department of Mineral Resources and Energy placed prohibitions on the citizens' ability to buy fuel in portable containers and canisters, citing concerns that stockpiling would exacerbate the situation.

==== Medical supply shortages ====
Clicks and Dis-Chem, the two largest pharmaceutical retailers in South Africa, reported supply disruptions due to looting. The provision of clinical medicine to hospitals was also disrupted. As of 16 July, it has been estimated that approximately 50% of patients with chronic illness in KwaZulu-Natal lack an adequate supply of necessary medicine. Healthcare providing facilities in Pietermaritzburg were placed under severe pressure due to many members of staff being unable to get to their posts, while those that did get there had to deal with an influx of trauma patients. A junior doctor from Pietermaritzburg said that the disruptions in the supply chain resulted in an inability to restock medication, PPE, blood, and syringes.

=== Financial ===
==== Economic ====
The South African rand weakened as much as 2% on 12 July, the most it has since 25 February. Based on a preliminary analysis on 13 July, the South African Special Risks Insurance Association (SASRIA) estimated that total losses due to damage and looting may run into "billions of rand". In September 2021 it stated that the nationwide insurance claims could range between R20—25 billion, making it the most expensive riot in the world.

On 19 July 2021, officers of the eThekwini municipality and KwaZulu-Natal provincial government provided a recovery roadmap to the Toyota Motor Corporation. Reportedly, the unrest had led the multinational to doubt the security and viability of its investments in the province.

Initial estimates by the South African Property Owners Association (SAPOA) on 13 July put the loss to the GDP of Durban in excess of R20 billion. Then-acting Minister in the Presidency Khumbudzo Ntshavheni cited SAPOA estimates on 20 July to say that the unrest could cost a loss of R50 billion ($3.4 billion) to South Africa's national economy. The damage to KwaZulu-Natal's economy alone was estimated to be R20 billion ($1.4 billion) according to Ntshavheni. 40,000 businesses and 50,000 traders were affected overall in KwaZulu-Natal, while stock worth R1.5 billion was lost and 150,000 jobs were stated to be at risk.

A survey carried out by the eThekwini Metropolitan Municipality and the Durban Chamber of Commerce and Industry in 2022 however estimated the losses in Durban alone to be R70 billion (equivalent to US$4.89 billion). This included R40 billion worth of sales and stock, R20 billion worth of machinery and equipment, and damage worth R15 billion to property. The survey further stated that 9,500 jobs were placed at risk and 16,000 business were affected.

A July 2021 preliminary report meanwhile estimated losses suffered by the province of Gauteng at R3.5 billion, according to the province's then-Premier David Makhura. He also added that 14,500 jobs were estimated to have been lost and 30 shopping malls were looted. Although no factories were affected in the riots, small-scale businesses were significantly affected.

==== Destruction of property ====
By Monday afternoon on 12 July, more than 200 shopping centres had been looted, with several in Soweto having been ransacked. On 14 July, the SA Pharmacy Council noted that 90 pharmacies were completely destroyed with the bulk of those in KwaZulu-Natal being hit the hardest. In Durban, during a 14 July media briefing, the mayor of eThekwini announced that up to 45,000 businesses were affected with 129,000 jobs at stake and over R16 billion (nearly $1 billion or £793 million) in damages to stock, property, and equipment.

ICASA announced that 113 network towers had been vandalised, resulting in the disruption of cellular networks. The National Professional Teachers' Organisation of South Africa decried the looting and vandalism of 32 KwaZulu-Natal schools, one of which burned down, as contemptible. In Ladysmith, KwaZulu-Natal, a crematorium was completely destroyed.

According to Ntshavheni, 161 shopping malls, 11 warehouses and eight factories in KwaZulu-Natal suffered significant damages. More than 200 shopping centres suffered looting or damage according to her, while 100 malls were subject to arson attacks, 161 liquor outlets and distributors were damaged, 1,400 ATMs and 90 pharmacies were damaged and about 300 banks and post offices were vandalized.

==== Suspension of services ====
Many of South Africa's banks had to shut down their ATMs, branches, and other facilities in response to the unrest. Over 300 Capitec Bank branches and ATMs were closed, Nedbank closed 226 branches as well as 59 Boxer outlets, ABSA Bank closed approximately 375 branches, and Standard Bank had to close 81 branches in KwaZulu-Natal and 116 in Gauteng after 33 of their branches and 220 ATMs were affected. In Pietermaritzburg, ambulances and other medical staff feared being attacked and were unwilling to go into dangerous areas, and in some cases they were not able to get to emergencies.

=== COVID-19 ===
==== COVID-19 vaccine rollout crisis ====
Following the impact of the looting and destruction to property, multiple COVID-19 vaccine rollout sites were closed to prevent looting and property destruction. These precautions slowed the vaccination roll-out while the country was still battling its third wave of infection. The SA Pharmacy Council's Vincent Tlala said that COVID-19 vaccines were among the looted items from pharmacies that were affected.

On 15 July 2021, the World Health Organization's Africa director Matshidiso Moeti warned that South Africa would see an increase in cases due to the disruptions across KwaZulu-Natal and Gauteng. She also noted that while the vaccination programme was aiming for 300,000 vaccines a day before the unrest unfolded, they had only done under 154,000 on 14 July. A junior doctor from Pietermaritzburg mentioned that they were running out of PPE for their Covid wards in the midst of the third wave.

==== Superspreader event ====
Epidemiology Professor Quarraisha Abdool Karim cautioned that the ongoing riots could be a superspreader due to large numbers of people gathering in small and confined places.

=== Effect on pending legislation ===
At the time that the unrest took place, the Parliament of South Africa was considering a Firearms Control Amendment Bill, which would have amended firearm regulations in South Africa to remove self-defence as a legal ground for gun ownership by civilians. Various civil society organisations, from the South African Institute of Race Relations and the Institute for Accountability in Southern Africa to SA Gun Owners Association and Free State Agriculture, and political parties like the Democratic Alliance, believed that the bill would fail to pass constitutional muster and had to be rejected as the unrest had highlighted the necessity of an armed citizenry in a country where the state's security forces were unable to provide protection and law and order.

== Reactions ==
=== Domestic ===
- The ANC Veterans' League's president Snuki Zikalala denounced the violence and looting that took place while he voiced support and approval for the deployment of the SANDF to reinforce the SAPS.
- ActionSA leader Herman Mashaba announced a separate class action lawsuit to be laid against the government and the ANC for failing to take swift action against the riots and looting. Mashaba said that "we believe that there is more than sufficient jurisprudence that merits this a strong test case, and assists us in holding the government to account for its willful failure to ensure proper law enforcement and the protection of lives, livelihoods and property".
- Opposition party leader John Steenhuisen of the Democratic Alliance announced that the party would be laying criminal charges against Jacob Zuma's children, Duduzane Zuma and Duduzile Zuma-Sambudla, for allegedly inciting the violence and looting.
- On 15 July 2021, Misuzulu Ka Zwelithini, reigning King of the Zulu nation, issued a statement calling for calm and a return to order.
- The leader of Freedom Front Plus, Pieter Groenewald, said those responsible for the unrest should face charges of sedition, among others. He added that South Africa needed to learn necessary lessons from the looting and violence, especially the need for rural development. Finally, he stated that the intelligence services failed the country.
- On 16 July 2021, the Thabo Mbeki Foundation released a statement claiming that the violent unrest is part of a counterrevolutionary insurgency seeking "state capture."
- On 26 July 2021, Julius Malema, the leader of the EFF, criticised Ramaphosa's decision to deploy the SANDF to quell the unrest, and threatened to join in. "No soldiers on our streets! Otherwise, we are joining. All fighters must be ready." he said. He also rejected the claim that the unrest constituted an "insurrection".

=== Governments ===
- Botswana The Government of Botswana issued a travel warning for South Africa as violence escalated in the country and advised its citizens to avoid travelling to the Gauteng and KwaZulu-Natal areas. The government also advised Botswana citizens in South Africa to exercise extreme caution and avoid unnecessary movements.
- India Foreign minister Subrahmanyam Jaishankar spoke to Naledi Pandor, Minister of International Relations and Cooperation to express his concern with regards to reports of Indian South Africans being targeted by looters.
- Lesotho The Minister of Small Business Thesele Maseribane appealed to Ramaphosa to let regional leaders facilitate dialogues to ease tensions in South Africa and relieve the small business sector of Lesotho.
- Namibia President Hage Geingob noted that his country would be badly affected by the protests as most of their products, including oxygen for medical use, come from South Africa. He also added that the actions of protestors were not a solution to the problem and conveyed his sympathies to Ramaphosa.
- United States The United States Embassy in Pretoria monitored the situation closely across South Africa and requested that US citizens living in South Africa ensure that they have sufficient food, fuel and medical supplies. The US embassy also received numerous inquiries from US citizens in South Africa about the availability of return flights to the United States.
- Zimbabwe President Emmerson Mnangagwa called for an end to the protests and looting in South Africa and was quoted as saying "In the case of South Africa, we wish the current challenges facing our brothers and sisters in that country be resolved soon."

=== Supranational organisations ===
- AU On 13 July 2021, the Chairperson of the African Union Commission Moussa Faki released a press statement condemning the violence in South Africa. It also warned that internal disorder may threaten the stability of the region.
- UN On 13 July 2021, the United Nations in South Africa condemned the violence and expressed support for the government.
- EU On 15 July 2021, the European Union delegation in South Africa expressed the concern over the situation that affected the citizens of South Africa including the expatriates from EU member states in South Africa. Echoing the UN statement, the EU called for all law enforcement agencies to act proportionately and respect human rights whilst they tackle these complex incidents.

== Aftermath ==
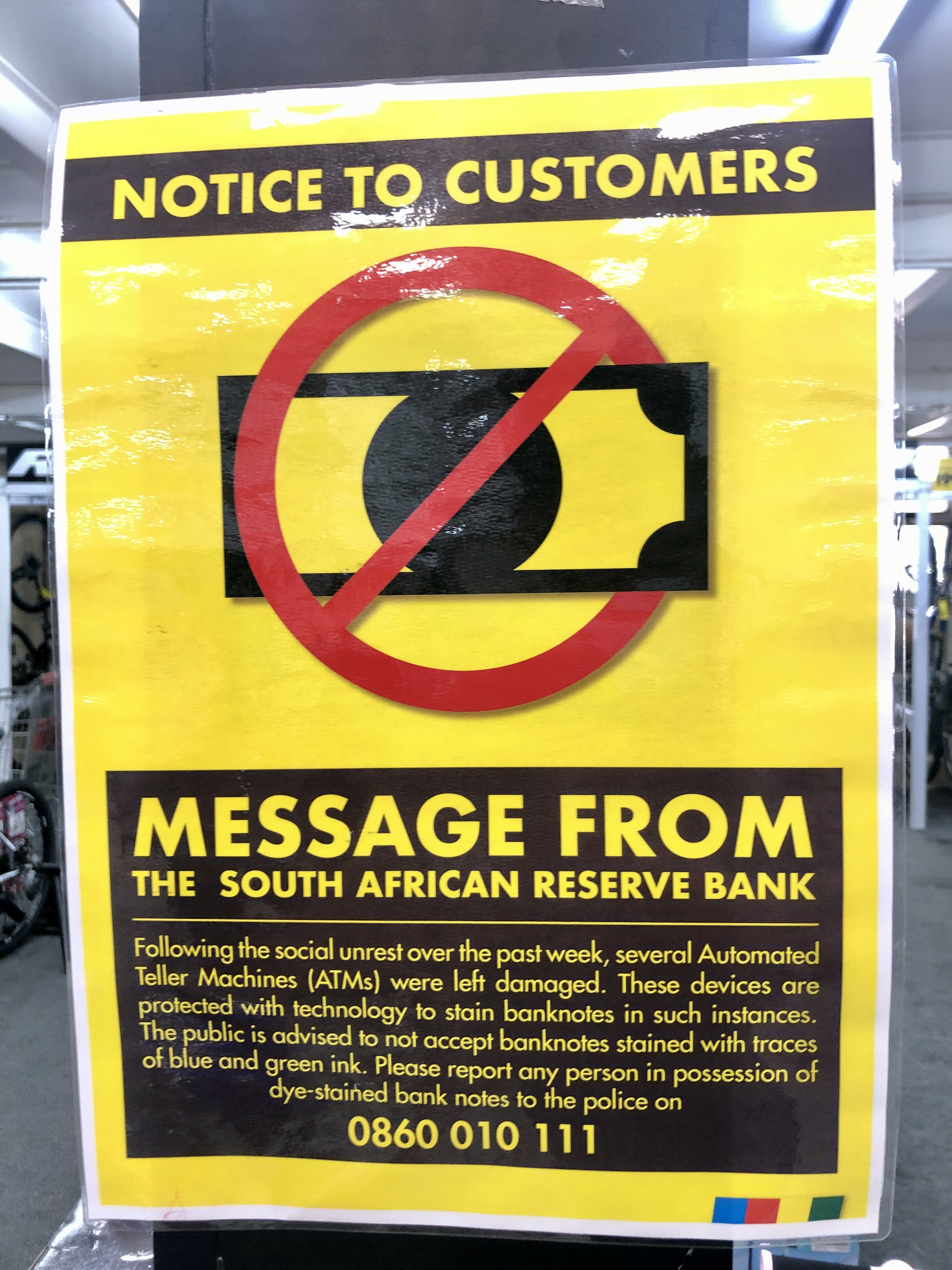
South African looting response

=== Clean-up operations ===
By 15 July 2021, volunteer groups in Gauteng and KwaZulu-Natal had begun repairing damaged property, donating food and providing transport to affected communities.

=== State of disaster ===
On 29 July 2021, citing the violence and looting that had caused widespread damage, KwaZulu-Natal premier Sihle Zikalala declared a state of disaster for the province, which decision he claimed was arrived at by the provincial executive council on 28 July.

=== Criminal justice ===
Police are investigating suspects and have arrested one unnamed individual as of 16 July 2021. 682 individuals face prosecution on allegations of public violence, looting, and destruction of infrastructure as of 19 July 2021.

Thulani Dlomo, the former head of the State Security Agency special operations unit and a loyal supporter of Zuma, is reported to be under investigation for inciting unrest. Radio personality and Zuma supporter Ngizwe Mchunu was also arrested for incitement to commit public violence. Bonginkosi Khanyile was also charged with incitement of violence, and due to appear in the Durban Magistrates Court on 22 October 2021.

ANC West Rand councillor Clarence Tabane was charged with incitement to commit public violence. Bruce Nimmerhoudt, a mayoral candidate for the Patriotic Alliance party, appeared in court on charges of alleged incitement to commit public violence, and was charged under the Terrorism and Related Activities Act (Terrorism). ANC ward councillor Solly Seloane from Daveyton, Ekurhuleni was arrested for public violence and theft after CCTV footage appeared to show him stealing clothes from Markham and Totalsports stores during the unrest.

On 4 August evidence from multiple WhatsApp groups was handed over to the SAPS by GOOD party representative Brett Herron to assist with investigations into the cause of the unrest. The Daily Maverick stated that the evidence directly linked 26 individuals, allegedly from within the ANC and government, with instigating, organising, and coordinating the unrest following Zuma's imprisonment.

On 28 August, the Hawks arrested two suspects in Gauteng and KwaZulu-Natal on suspicion of using social media to incite public violence. Both suspects were expected to appear in court on 30 August 2021.

On 15 November, the South African Human Rights Commission began an inquiry into the causes and consequences of the July unrest. It will examine allegations of racially motivated attacks and killings, and the actions of the security forces. The inquiry is expected to run until December 2021.

On 30 January 2025, Jacob Zuma's daughter Duduzile Zuma-Sambudla was arrested on terrorism charges on suspicion of inciting violence on social media that contributed to the 2021 unrest.

== See also ==
- 2023 South African National Shutdown
- Food riot
- Wealth inequality in South Africa
- Corruption in South Africa
- Crime in South Africa
