= Empowerdex =

South African company

Empowerdex (Pty) Ltd
- Company type: Private
- Industry: Black economic empowerment ratings
- Founded: June 2001; 25 years ago
- Founder: Vuyo Jack (executive chairman); Chia-Chao Wu (executive deputy chairman)
- Headquarters: Johannesburg, South Africa
- Website: empowerdex.com

Empowerdex (Pty) Ltd is a South African company which provides services related to Black Economic Empowerment (BEE) compliance. Founded in 2001, it was an early pioneer in the industry of independent BEE verification and ratings. It also conducts research on BEE uptake and provides private advisory services on BEE compliance.

== History ==
Empowerdex was founded in June 2001 by Witwatersrand University classmates Vuyo Jack and Chia-Chao Wu. They ran the company from Jack's house using Wu's capital and consulted Moody's, the credit rating agency, for advice on their rating methodology. Businessman Brian Joffe, then the CEO of Bidvest, was the first external investor.

In 2005 the Department of Trade and Industry announced plans to require accreditation of BEE ratings agencies, and the following year Empowerdex was one of eight founding members of the Association of BEE Verification Agencies (ABVA), an industry association founded to promote accelerate the accreditation process.

As of 2019, the firm said that it employed over 100 people and had served more than 6,000 companies as clients.

== Empowerment rankings ==
Empowerdex is well known for publishing a ranking of JSE-listed companies which compares their performance across BEE metrics. Empowerdex first announced the ranking initiative in November 2002 and published the first list in March 2003. The following year, it partnered with the Financial Mail to publish the rankings in a special supplement of that newspaper as the Top Empowerment Companies index; the first annual edition, published in April 2004, named Telkom as South Africa's most empowered company and became the Financial Mail's top-selling issue of the year. In later years, Empowerdex compiled the rankings for the Mail & Guardian's Most Empowered Companies index and, most recently, for Sanlam's Transformation Gauge.

== Bribery scandal ==
In March 2019, in testimony before the Zondo Commission, former Bosasa executive Angelo Agrizzi alleged that Bosasa – a prolific state contractor – had paid an Empowerdex employee R40,000 in exchange for favorable BEE ratings. Empowerdex said that it had no knowledge of such a bribe but had initiated an internal investigation. On 4 April 2019, the South African National Accreditation System suspended Empowerdex's BEE accreditation for three months, citing the firm's "failure to comply with some of the accreditation requirements." Empowerdex said that the suspension was linked to Agrizzi's testimony and that it had commissioned an independent forensic investigation. SANAS, however, said that there were prior complaints against the firm pertaining to the accuracy of its verification reports.

At the end of July 2019, Empowerdex reported that the suspension had been lifted in early July, that a SANAS investigation had identified "minor non-conformances," and that the independent investigation into Agrizzi's bribery allegations was ongoing.
