= Black Economic Empowerment =

South-African government policy

The first page of the Broad-based Black Economic Empowerment Act.

Black Economic Empowerment (BEE) is a policy of the South African government which aims to facilitate broader participation in the economy by black people. A form of affirmative action, it is intended especially to redress the inequalities created by apartheid. The policy provides incentives – especially preferential treatment in government procurement processes – to businesses which contribute to black economic empowerment according to several measurable criteria, including through partial or majority black ownership, hiring black employees, and contracting with black-owned suppliers. The preferential procurement aspect of BEE has been viewed as paradigmatic of a sustainable procurement approach, whereby government procurement is used to advance social policy objectives. So-called "BEE deals" – transactions aiming to increase black ownership of large businesses – have been conducted on a large scale, with BEE transactions concluded between 1994 and 2005 valued at between R150 billion and R285 billion.

The government has subscribed to an explicit policy of black economic empowerment since 1994, but BEE was relaunched as the more comprehensive, and less ownership-focused, Broad-Based Black Economic Empowerment (BBBEE) programme around the time of the passage of the BBBEE legislation in 2003. However, although earlier initiatives were governed by different legislation and sets of arrangements, the underlying principles and policy are very similar, and BBBEE is often still referred to as "BEE" in common parlance.

In June 2021, President Cyril Ramaphosa announced that South Africa's BEE strategy and legislation would be reviewed, especially to ensure that they are not exploited for corrupt purposes.

== History ==
=== Early policy ===
When the African National Congress (ANC) came to power in 1994, the new government's priorities included redressing apartheid's legacy of economic exclusion. Under apartheid, legislation and practice had restricted the access of non-whites to job opportunities, capital, business and property ownership, and other forms of economic advancement, leaving vast racial inequalities in wealth and income. The new Constitution, finalised in 1996, emphasised protections against unfair discrimination and against disadvantage arising from the same. This was complemented by a 1997 Green Paper on Public Procurement Reform, which called for affirmative action measures in government procurement processes.

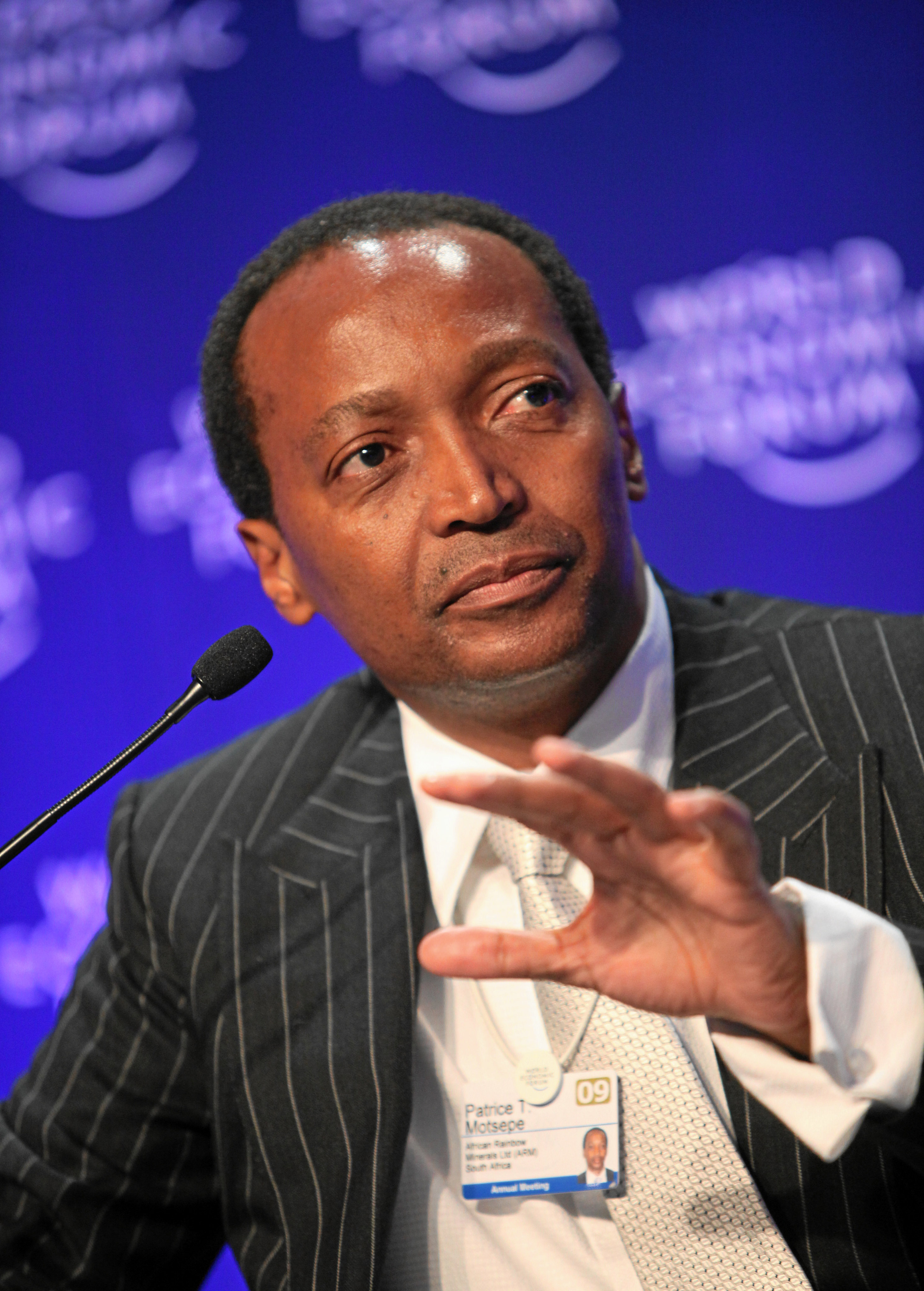
Patrice Motsepe is well-known as a beneficiary of various multimillion-rand BEE transactions in the 1990s.

The central socioeconomic policy framework of Nelson Mandela's government was the Reconstruction and Development Programme (RDP), which did not specifically refer to "black economic empowerment". However, the term was used in the earlier ANC RDP policy framework, on which the government policy was based. The ANC document viewed BEE initiatives as a means to "deracialise business ownership and control".

Early stages of BEE focused on promoting black ownership of large businesses. BEE transactions aimed to diversify the demographics of company shareholders. White-owned companies had to voluntarily enter into these transactions. In the absence of organised sources of capital, many of the black participants relied on highly-geared financing structures and special-purpose vehicles. Several BEE deals thus collapsed during the 1997 Asian financial crisis. According to estimates, black control of business had risen to about 10% of shares on the Johannesburg Stock Exchange by 1998, but, following the financial crisis, fell dramatically to between 1% and 3.8% by 2000. Meanwhile, the promotion of black empowerment in areas other than ownership was pursued piecemeal, especially through a series of laws including the Skills Development Act, 1998 and the 1998 Employment Equity Act.

=== Expansion ===
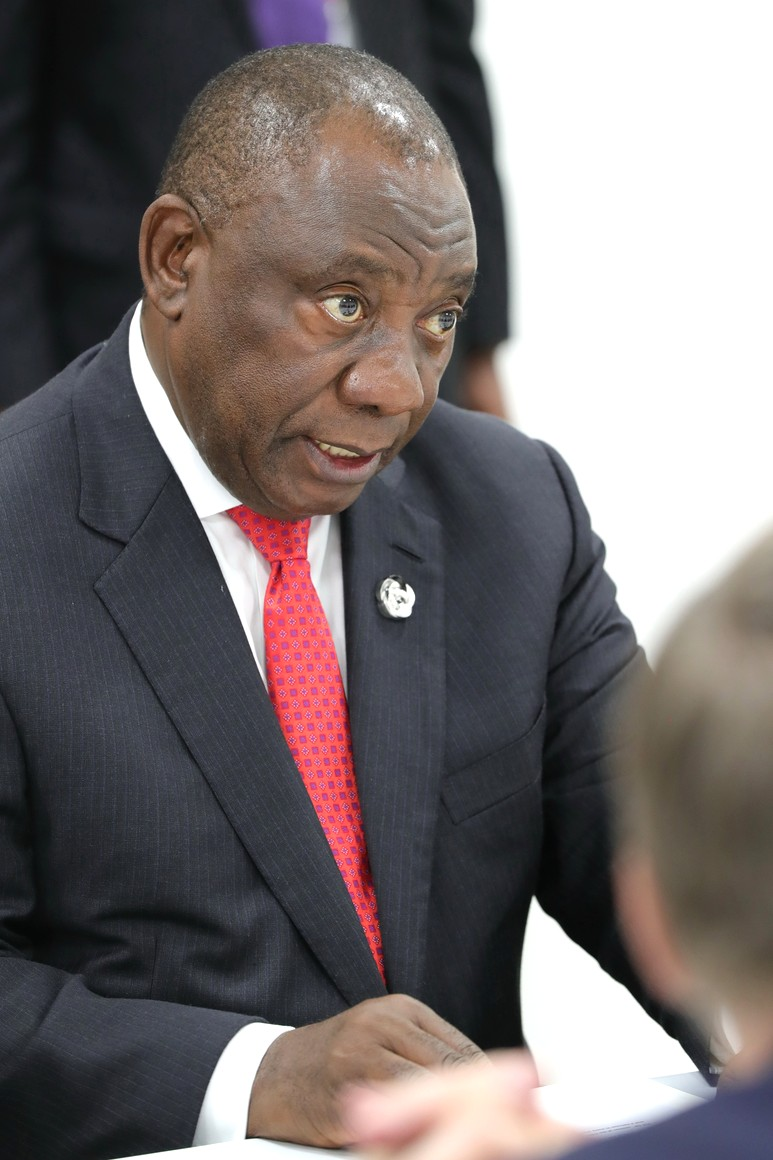
Cyril Ramaphosa chaired the BEE Commission.

Amid dissatisfaction with the progress of existing initiatives, in May 1998 the Black Business Council appointed future President Cyril Ramaphosa to chair a BEE Commission. The Commission proposed a broad definition of BEE:

It is an integrated and coherent socio-economic process. It is located within the context of the country's national transformation programme, namely the RDP. It is aimed at redressing the imbalances of the past by seeking to substantially and equitably transfer and confer the ownership, management and control of South Africa's financial and economic resources to the majority of its citizens. It seeks to ensure broader and meaningful participation in the economy by black people to achieve sustainable development and prosperity.

The Commission also proposed the passage of focused BEE legislation and the adoption of an integrated national strategy on BEE, comprising a set of simplified and coordinated guidelines and regulations applicable across the economy, to be implemented by an oversight body reporting to the cabinet. On some views, the Commission was influential in bolstering support for the broader approach ultimately taken by the government to BEE. This is what sociologist Roger Southall called the "maximalist" (now the "broad-based") approach to BEE, envisaging a more dramatic transformation of the South African economy, with redistributive objectives going beyond black ownership. According to Southall, a major force behind this shift in strategy was the growing popular perception that BEE had thus far worked to benefit only a tiny black elite, a criticism prominently voiced by the influential Congress of South African Trade Unions.

The stage for the expanded BBBEE strategy was set by the Preferential Procurement Act of 2000, which sanctioned preferential treatment for historically disadvantaged groups in the distribution of state procurement contracts. The regulations accompanying the act, promulgated in 2001, outlined a point system by which preference is allocated in the evaluation of public tenders – in addition to the competitiveness of a bid's price, "points" were given for the bidder's contribution to black economic empowerment. Shortly after the passage of the act, the first industry-specific BEE charters were published – the Petroleum and Liquid Fuels Charter in 2000 and the Mining Charter in 2002, both given regulatory status under the Mineral and Petroleum Resources Development Act. The Mining Charter, in particular, embraced principles later codified under BBBEE, identifying seven "pillars" of BEE (only one of which was ownership) and setting out a BEE "scorecard" for businesses. At the 51st National Conference of the ANC in December 2002, President Thabo Mbeki committed the government to drawing up a "Transformation Charter" involving a consolidated and clarified strategy on BEE.

=== 2003 Act ===
Broad-based Black Economic Empowerment Act, 2003

Parliament of South Africa
- Long title: To establish a legislative framework for the promotion of black economic empowerment; to empower the Minister to issue codes of good practice and to publish transformation charters; to establish the Black Economic Empowerment Advisory Council; and to provide for matters connected therewith.
- Citation: Act No. 53 of 2003
- Enacted by: Parliament of South Africa
- Assented to: 7 January 2004
- Commenced: 21 April 2004

Amended by
- Broad-Based Black Economic Empowerment Amendment Act 46 of 2013
- Status: Amended

The BBBEE Act passed in 2003, under the custodianship of the Department of Trade and Industry, and commenced in 2004. The Act's stated objectives were to facilitate broad-based black economic empowerment by:

- promoting economic transformation in order to enable meaningful participation of black people in the economy;
- achieving a substantial change in the racial composition of ownership and management structures and in the skilled occupations of existing and new enterprises;
- increasing the extent to which communities, workers, cooperatives and other collective enterprises own and manage existing and new enterprises and increasing their access to economic activities, infrastructure and skills training;
- increasing the extent to which black women own and manage existing and new enterprises, and increasing their access to economic activities, infrastructure and skills training;
- promoting investment programmes that lead to broad-based and meaningful participation in the economy by black people in order to achieve sustainable development and general prosperity;
- empowering rural and local communities by enabling access to economic activities, land, infrastructure, ownership and skills; and
- promoting access to finance for black economic empowerment.

During this period, under President Mbeki, the government's approach to BEE became "increasingly focused and assertive," and it became unambiguously committed to maximalist or broad-based BEE, with a broader and deeper scope than mere black ownership of business. BEE was seen as proceeding along three main lines: in addition to "direct empowerment" (now including managerial as well as ownership control), BEE would also explicitly encompass human resource development (employment equity and skills development) and "indirect empowerment" (procurement policies, enterprise development, and socioeconomic development). Codes of Good Practice to complement the BBBEE Act were gazetted in two phases in 2005, setting out standardised criteria for measuring compliance with BBBEE indicators on a "scorecard"; the codes have been amended occasionally since then.

== Scorecards ==
At the centre of the implementation of the BBBEE Act is the "scorecard" according to which the compliance of individual businesses is measured. The Codes of Good Practice set out specific criteria (known as "targets") under each of the seven elements or pillars of BBBEE, which correspond to the seven categories on the scorecard. Each entity is measured against the scorecard to determine its BBBEE score (out of 105), which in turn is used to determine its BBBEE level. The level is published in a BBBEE certificate issued to the entity and valid for one year.

=== Significance ===
BBBEE certificates are essential to securing certain incentives or contracts with the state or with other private entities. Bids by private entities for government procurement contracts are typically evaluated in terms of a 90/10 or 80/20 point system: the competitiveness of the price of the bid is evaluated 90 or 80 points, while the remaining 10 or 20 points are awarded for the bidder's BBBEE rating. A BBBEE rating can therefore determine the outcome of closely contested bids. Some state entities also set out minimum BBBEE criteria which entities must meet in order to qualify to submit bids. At the same time, in business between private entities, it is often attractive for entities to contract with entities which themselves have high BBBEE ratings, because this may boost their own BBBEE score (in the preferential procurement category of the scorecard). Entities which have won state contracts (or mining licenses) are also often required to meet certain BBBEE obligations in selecting their private suppliers, as a condition of those contracts. Finally, in some sectors, the award by government of operating licenses and concessions (such as concessions to export) is conditional on the licensed entity meeting certain BBBEE criteria – for example, in terms of the Mineral and Petroleum Resources Development Act, entities are eligible for mining licenses only if they are 26% black-owned.

=== Generic scorecard ===
The generic BBBEE scorecard is as follows:

| Element | Weighting | Targets |
|---|---|---|
| Ownership | 25 points | 25% + 1 vote exercisable voting rights to black people (4 points); 10% exercisable voting rights to black women (2 points); 25% economic interest to black people (4 points); 10% economic interest to black women (2 points); 3% economic interest to black members of certain designated groups, including rural, youths, persons with disabilities, participants in cooperatives (3 points); 2% economic interest to new entrants (2 points); Achievement of target for repayment of acquisition debt (8 points) |
| Management control | 15 points | 50% of voting board members are black (2 points); 25% of voting board members are black women (1 point); 50% of executive directors are black (2 points); 25% of executive directors are black women (1 point); 60% of executive managers are black (2 points); 30% of executive managers are black women (1 point); 60% of senior managers are black (2 points); 30% of senior managers are black women (1 point); 75% of middle managers are black (2 points); 38% of middle managers are black women (1 point); 88% of junior managers are black (1 point); 44% of junior managers are black women (1 point); 2% of employees are black people with disabilities (2 points) |
| Skills development | 20 points | Expenditure on skills development for black employees at 6% of leviable amount (8 points); Expenditure on skills development for black employees with disabilities at 0.3% of leviable amount (4 points); 2.5% of employees are black participants in learnerships, apprenticeships, and internships (4 points); 2.5% of employees are unemployed participants in training programmes (4 points); Bonus: All black participants in learnerships are absorbed into employment (5 points) |
| Preferential procurement | 25 points | 80% of procurement expenditure to "empowering suppliers" (5 points); 15% of procurement expenditure to "empowering suppliers" that are Qualifying Small Enterprises (3 points); 15% of procurement expenditure to Exempted Micro-Enterprises (4 points); 40% of procurement expenditure to "empowering suppliers" that are majority black-owned (9 points); 12% of procurement expenditure to "empowering suppliers" that are 30% owned by black women (4 points); Bonus: 2% of procurement expenditure to majority black-owned suppliers from designated groups (2 points) |
| Enterprise and supplier development | 15 points | 1% of net after-tax profit to enterprise development contributions and sector-specific programmes (5 points); 2% of net after-tax profit to supplier development contributions (10 points); Bonus: One or more enterprise development beneficiaries graduates to supplier development level (1 point); Bonus: One or more jobs directly created by supplier development or enterprise development initiatives (1 point) |
| Socio-economic development | 5 points | 1% of net after-tax profit to socio-economic development contributions (5 points) |
| Total | 105 points | |

The most recent versions of the codes identify ownership, skills development, and supplier development as priority elements.

=== Sector-specific scorecards ===
There are sector-specific codes defining targets specifically applicable to the agriculture, finance, defence, ICT, transport, property, forestry, construction, tourism, and media, advertising and communication sectors.

=== Small and micro-enterprises ===
The legislation's requirements for small businesses are less onerous. For example, Qualifying Small Enterprises (businesses with total annual revenue between R10 million and R50 million) are scored on a different, more lenient scorecard. Moreover, Exempted Micro-Enterprises (including businesses with total annual revenue below R10 million and all start-ups in their first year) are automatically given Level 4 BBBEE status. And, at the same time, primarily black-owned entities falling into either of these two categories automatically qualify for Level 1 (100% black-owned) or Level 2 (>51% black-owned) status.

== Definition of "black" ==
The BBBEE Act defines black persons as "Africans, Coloureds and Indians," who, as of an amendment to the act in 2013, are South African citizens by birth or descent or were naturalised as South African citizens prior to 27 April 1994 (or would have been eligible for naturalisation prior to that date). This definition excluded ethnically Chinese citizens from becoming beneficiaries of the legislation. The government argued that, although Chinese people had been subject to discrimination under apartheid, that discrimination had been applied inconsistently and was less clearcut than that experienced by other non-white groups. For example, although Chinese people were treated as coloured under some legislation, from 1984 they were exempt from the discriminatory provisions of the Group Areas Act. In 2008, arbitrating a legal challenge by the Chinese Association of South Africa, the Pretoria High Court ruled that the South African Chinese community were "black" for the purposes of the BBBEE Act, as well as the Employment Equity Act.

== Responses ==
Some criticisms of BEE – particularly those about its economic effects – are difficult to disentangle from broader criticisms of South Africa's broader employment equity or affirmative action programme. This is because BEE is closely tied with that broader programme, implying affirmative action both explicitly and insofar as it provides private-sector entities with strong incentives to pursue affirmative action internally. General criticisms of affirmative action are therefore also relevant.

=== Extent of impact and the black elite ===
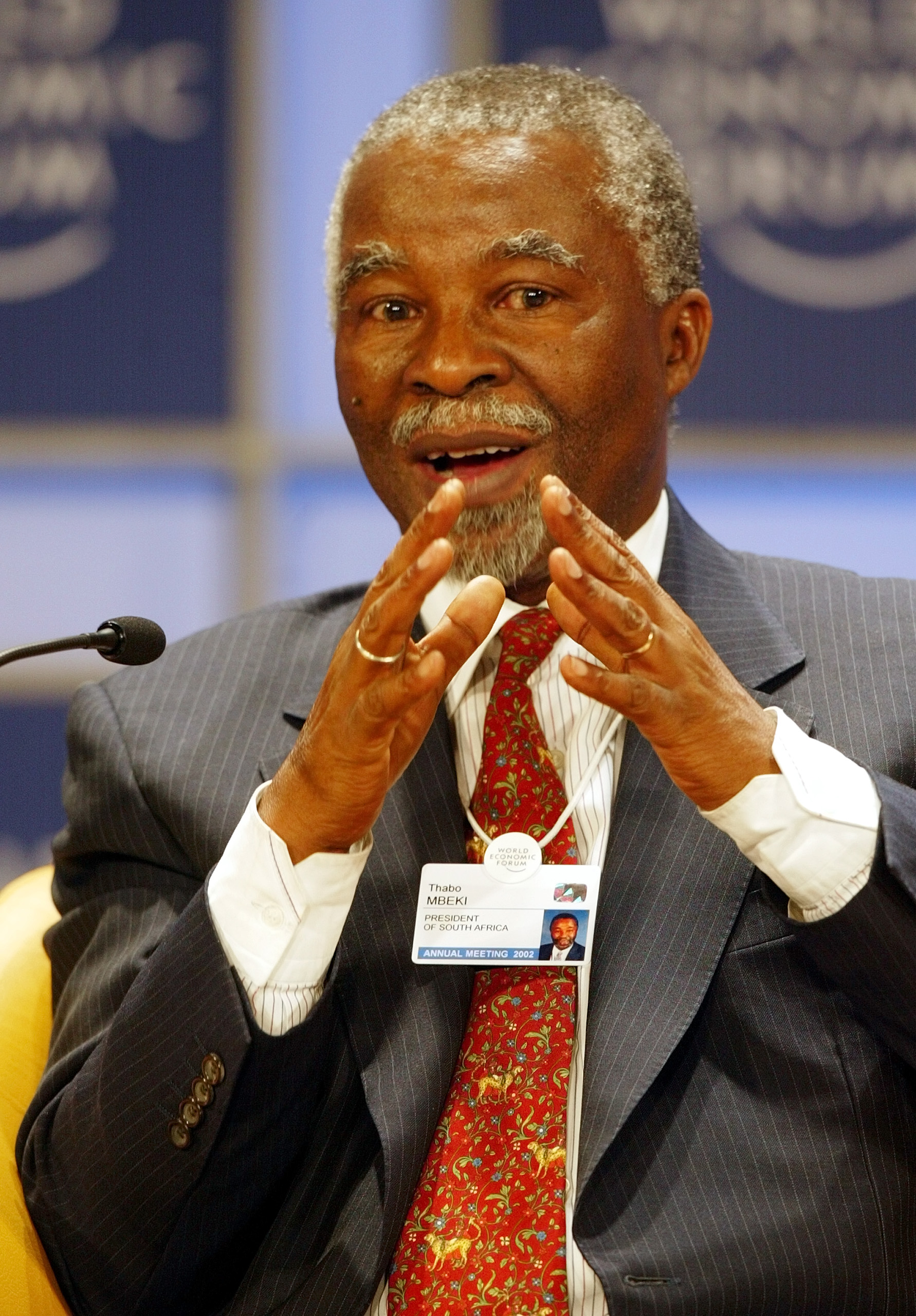
President Thabo Mbeki advocated for the development of a South African black bourgeoisie.

The "narrow base of empowerment" effected by BEE – one of the central concerns leading to the reform of BEE as a "broad-based" programme in the early 2000s – remains one of the major criticisms levied against the policy. At the advent of the policy, and especially during the Mbeki presidency, the ANC was explicitly committed to promoting the development of a "patriotic black bourgeoisie" whose rise could initiate broader transformation in the economy. The 50th National Conference of the ANC in 1997 agreed that:

Though such instances may be an exception to the norm, experience in other countries has taught us that, without vigilance, elements of these new capitalist classes can become witting or unwitting tools of monopoly interests, or parasites who thrive on corruption in public office. However, in the overall, the rising black bourgeoisie and middle strata are objectively important motive forces of transformation whose interests coincide with at least the immediate interests of the majority. They are, in this sense and in this phase, part of the motive forces of fundamental change.

Critics of BEE have raised concerns including elite enrichment, corruption, and its effect on employment. Archbishop Desmond Tutu expressed this view, asking, "What is black empowerment when it seems to benefit not the vast majority but an elite that tends to be recycled?" He also warned that, combined with widespread "dehumanising poverty," the system could build popular resentment against the ruling classes and between different sections of society. Pieter Groenewald, leader of opposition party the Freedom Front Plus, has called BEE an acronym for "black elite enrichment"; and John Steenhuisen, the former leader of the opposition Democratic Alliance, has argued that BEE encourages the development of oligarchy at the expense of economic equality.

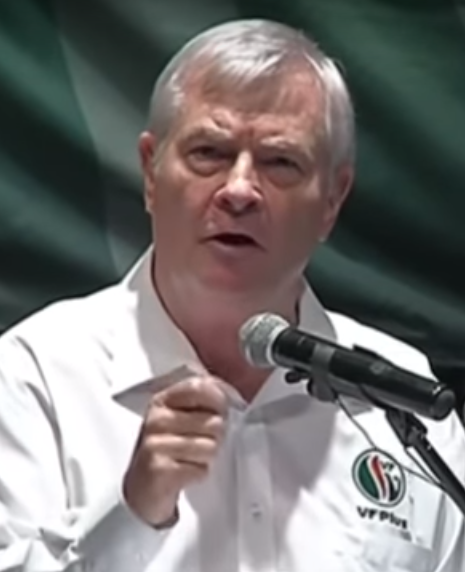
Pieter Groenewald of the FF+ is an outspoken opponent of BEE.

A common accusation is that, despite the shift to BBBEE, BEE remains primarily geared towards ownership transactions, increasing black shareholding and directorships – and the wealth of their holders – without necessarily increasing the substantive control of black South Africans over the economy. The notion of a BEE elite adds to this the further accusation that BEE ownership transactions themselves disproportionately involve one small group of black businessmen, with insufficient opportunities afforded to the black population at large. Anthea Jeffrey of the Institute of Race Relations has claimed that the group of beneficiaries amounts to about 15% of the black population. The shift to broad-based BEE has led to an increase in the number of BEE deals involving large black-owned consortia, which some commentators have suggested may have increased the scope of beneficiaries under those deals. However, with little detailed public information available about the composition of the relevant consortia, this claim has been difficult to verify.

On other, non-ownership metrics, there has been positive transformation since 1994, but critics argue that the pace of change has been inadequate. The Institute of Race Relations found that the number of black South Africans employed as managers had increased by 176.3% between 2001 and 2017 (compared to 32.1% population growth in that group over the same period). Yet in 2021, the Commission for Employment Equity found that white people remained dramatically over-represented in the top levels of the private sector: they filled 67.8% of top management positions, 58% of senior management positions, and 43.2% of all professionally qualified positions. As of the second quarter of 2021, the unemployment rate for white South Africans, at 8.6%, remained significantly lower than that for blacks (38.2%), coloureds (28.5%), and Indians and Asians (19.5%).

=== Corruption ===
==== BEE fronting ====
The government defines "BEE fronting" as occurring whenever entities deliberately misrepresent facts about their BEE compliance. However, the phrase is most commonly used in reference to so-called "window-dressing," a form of tokenism whereby entities improve their BEE status by appointing black directors, managers, employees, or suppliers, who are, in practice, discouraged or inhibited from substantially participating in or benefitting from the enterprise. Several large companies have been investigated for BEE fronting, including Netcare and MTN. The BBBEE Commission has increasingly raised concern about the extent of the practice. In 2021, Commissioner Zodwa Ntuli said that fronting was so widespread that improved measured performance against BEE objectives might not correlate with actual improvement in the economic situation of black people. She also called for a more stringent government response to those found guilty of fronting, which is punishable by fines, blacklisting, and up to ten years' imprisonment.

==== Political corruption ====
A notable criticism of BBBEE is that the policy has been co-opted by members of South Africa's political elite, mostly within the governing ANC, for the purpose of self-enrichment. From an early stage of BEE, analysts, extrapolating from the concept of a "patriotic black bourgeoisie," noted the likely contribution of BEE to the growth of a black capitalist class with close links to the ANC. Perhaps most prominently, several politically connected ANC stalwarts – notably Saki Macozoma, Tokyo Sexwale, Cyril Ramaphosa, and Patrice Motsepe – gained substantial wealth and influence in key sectors such as mining and finance through BEE deals. More broadly, BEE has been thought to increase the importance or perceived importance of political connections to gaining state contracts and other business incentives, with the extent of inter-linkages between the state and business providing "the conditions for the possible emergence of a corrupt and nepotistic governance system." Moreover, some have suggested that the highly leveraged arrangements used to finance many BEE endeavours – necessary because most black people left the apartheid era with little capital and limited access to the same – may, by increasing the indebtedness of BEE beneficiaries, "encourage a willingness to cut legal corners and lapse into criminality."

Detractors argue, therefore, not only that BEE beneficiaries are a small elite, but also that they tend to be a politically connected elite, comprising especially the friends and family of government and ANC officials. Critics also argue that BEE has thus become a major cause of political corruption in South Africa, with government contracts improperly awarded, at inflated prices, to politically connected "tenderpreneurs," sometimes to the detriment of quality and service delivery. These concerns have received increased attention following revelations of state capture during the presidency of Jacob Zuma. There were, for example, allegations that BEE-related corruption had taken place at Bosasa and in the controversial Vrede Dairy Project. At the Zondo Commission, former Bosasa executive Angelo Agrizzi implicated BEE verification agency Empowerdex in corruption, and it was later confirmed that Gupta-owned companies, implicated in substantial corruption, had secured Eskom contracts using fraudulent BEE certificates. Minister of Finance Enoch Godongwana said in 2022 that increased corruption in government procurement was one of the most significant challenges facing BEE.

=== Racism ===
Critics have questioned the appropriateness and fairness of the policy's use of racial classifications, themselves inherited from the apartheid era. This broad family of criticisms encompasses a range of views, including that using race markers further entrenches their power; that race is a suboptimal proxy for economic disadvantage; and that BEE constitutes a form of unjust or unconstitutional racial discrimination or reverse racism against whites.

=== Economic effects ===
Some critics argue that BEE deters investment in South Africa. Although BEE is not technically compulsory (unless the business wishes to seek certain contracts or benefits, or to be listed on the JSE), critics argue that BEE compliance increases the cost of doing business in South Africa, among other reasons because businesses may hire consultants and lawyers to help them navigate the complexity of the codes and other regulations. In 2018, for example, as a condition for increasing investment in South Africa, the European Union requested a relaxation of BEE ownership rules, calling the targets unfairly onerous.

Critics of BEE have also said it contributes to a brain drain of qualified workers from South Africa. One study found that corporate brain drain from South Africa is "very low if not rare", but that "losing numerous skilled individuals from different sectors", such as agriculture, still raises concerns around brain drain from the country. Others argue that the emigration of some skilled workers "creates opportunity" for diversifying the relevant sectors while appointing their replacements.

== See also ==
- Quotaism
- Economy of South Africa
- State-owned enterprises of South Africa
- Malaysian New Economic Policy, a similar policies in Malaysia
- Benteng program, a similar policies in Indonesia during the Old Order regime
- Ali Baba (business practice) in Malay Archipelago
