= S v Dlamini (2012) =

- Court: Supreme Court of Appeal
- Full case name: S v Dlamini
- Decided: 27 March 2012

Case history
- Appealed from: KwaZulu-Natal Division

Court membership
- Judges sitting: Farlam JA, Van Heerden JA, Cachalia JA, Snyders JA, Majiedt JA

Case opinions
- Decision by: Majiedt JA

S v Dlamini was a South African court case. The central question was of duplication of convictions.

The accused had been charged with and convicted on three counts of robbery. He was one of three perpetrators, one of whom was armed and had threatened a group of three women. The robbers had taken the women's property and departed. A 3-2 majority of the SCA found that there had been a separate intent by the robbers to rob each woman. There had, therefore, been no inappropriate duplication of convictions.

== Background ==
At 7:00pm one evening in 2002, three women were meeting at the residence of one of them in order to travel to church together. Two of the women were already in the car, ready to leave, when the third woman arrived in her own vehicle. She got out of her vehicle and as she began walking towards the car in the driveway, three men in overalls moved towards it and pointed a gun at her. They demanded that the women hand over their possessions, and also the keys to both cars. The men then took both vehicles and drove away. The appellant was found in possession of a firearm and ammunition three days later, but the firearm could not be definitely linked to the robbery.

The appellant was convicted in a regional court of three counts of robbery, possession of an unlicensed firearm and ammunition, and theft of a car. The three counts of robbery and the firearm offences were committed in 2002. The theft of the car was an older charge from 1999. He was sentenced to serve a total of 45 years' imprisonment.

== Appeals ==
On appeal to the high court, the conviction for the theft of the car in 1999 was set aside and the sentence reduced to 43 years' imprisonment.

A further appeal against the sentence to the SCA, was made on the grounds that there had been a duplication of convictions, as the three robbery charges arose from actions committed with a single intent in a continuous transaction.

== Judgment ==
As to whether there had been a duplication of convictions in respect of the three counts of robbery, Majiedt JA held for the majority (Van Heerden JA and Snyders JA concurring, and Farlam JA and Cachalia JA dissenting) that there had been a separate intent by the three robbers to rob each of the three women which was executed separately.

The convictions were upheld, but the sentences were ordered to run concurrently, so the actual imprisonment was reduced to seventeen years.

== Related cases ==
- National Director of Public Prosecutions v King 2010 (2) SACR 146 (SCA) (2010 (7) BCLR 656; [2010] 3 All SA 304).
- S v Dos Santos and Another 2010 (2) SACR 382 (SCA).
- S v Egglestone 2009 (1) SACR 244 (SCA) ([2008] 4 All SA 207).
- S v Fourie 2001 (2) SACR 118 (SCA) ([2001] 4 All SA 365).
- S v Malgas 2001 (1) SACR 469 (SCA) (2001 (2) SA 1222; [2001] 3 All SA 220).
- S v Maneli 2009 (1) SACR 509 (SCA).
- S v Moloto 1982 (1) SA 844 (A).
- S v Vilakazi 2009 (1) SACR 552 (SCA) ([2008] 4 All SA 396).
- S v Whitehead and Others 2008 (1) SACR 431 (SCA) ([2008] 2 All SA 257).

=== Statutes ===
- Criminal Procedure Act 51 of 1977.
