= Opsoclonus myoclonus syndrome =

- Other names: Dancing eye syndrome
- Specialty: Neurology

Opsoclonus myoclonus syndrome (OMS), also known as opsoclonus-myoclonus-ataxia (OMA), is a rare neurological disorder of unknown cause which appears to be the result of an autoimmune process involving the nervous system. It is an extremely rare condition, affecting as few as 1 in 10,000,000 people per year. It affects 2 to 3% of children with neuroblastoma and has been reported to occur with celiac disease and diseases of neurologic and autonomic dysfunction.

== Signs and symptoms ==
Symptoms include:

- opsoclonus (rapid, involuntary, multivectorial (horizontal and vertical), unpredictable, conjugate fast eye movements without intersaccadic [quick rotation of the eyes] intervals)
- myoclonus (brief, involuntary twitching of a muscle or a group of muscles)
- cerebellar ataxia, both truncal and appendicular
- aphasia (a language disorder in which there is an impairment of speech and of comprehension of speech, caused by brain damage)
- mutism (a language disorder in which a person does not speak despite evidence of speech ability in the past, often part of a larger neurological or psychiatric disorder)
- lethargy
- irritability or malaise
- drooling
- strabismus (a condition in which the eyes are not properly aligned with each other)
- vomiting
- sleep disturbances
- emotional disturbances (including fits of rage)

About half of all OMS cases occur in association with neuroblastoma (a cancer of the sympathetic nervous system usually occurring in infants and children).

=== Disease course and clinical subtypes ===
In most cases, OMS starts with an acute flare-up of physical symptoms within days or weeks, but some less obvious symptoms such as irritability and malaise may begin weeks or months earlier.

== Cause ==
In children, most cases are associated with neuroblastoma and most of the others are suspected to be associated with a low-grade neuroblastoma that spontaneously regressed before detection. In adults, most cases are associated with breast carcinoma or small-cell lung carcinoma. It is one of the few paraneoplastic (meaning 'indirectly caused by cancer') syndromes that occurs in both children and adults, although the mechanism of immune dysfunction underlying the adult syndrome is probably quite different.

It is hypothesized that a viral infection (perhaps St. Louis encephalitis, Chikungunya, Epstein-Barr, Coxsackie B, enterovirus, or just a flu) causes the remaining cases, though a direct connection has not been proven. Rare cases of Opsoclonus myoclonus syndrome associated with Lyme disease have also been reported.

OMS is not generally considered an infectious disease. OMS is not passed on genetically.

== Diagnosis ==
Because OMS is so rare and occurs at an average age of 19 months (6 to 36 months), a diagnosis can be slow. Some cases have been diagnosed as having been caused by a virus. After a diagnosis of OMS is made, an associated neuroblastoma is discovered in half of cases, with median delay of 3 months.

The interictal EEG pattern is usually normal.

== Treatment ==
There is no known definitive cure for OMS. However, several drugs have proven to be effective in their treatment.

Some of medication used to treat the symptoms are:

- ACTH has shown improvements in symptoms but can result in an incomplete recovery with residual deficits.
- Corticosteroids (such as prednisone or methylprednisolone) used at high dosages (500 mg - 2 g per day intravenously for a course of 3 to 5 days) can accelerate regression of symptoms. Subsequent very gradual tapering with pills generally follows. Most patients require high doses for months to years before tapering.
- Intravenous Immunoglobulins (IVIg) are often used with varying results.
- Several other immunosuppressive drugs, such as cyclophosphamide and azathioprine, may be helpful in some cases.
- Chemotherapy for neuroblastoma may be effective, although data is contradictory and unconvincing at this point in time.
- Rituximab has been used with encouraging results.
- Other medications are used to treat symptoms without influencing the nature of the disease (symptomatic treatment):
  - Trazodone can be useful against irritability and sleep problems
- Additional treatment options include plasmapheresis for severe, steroid-unresponsive relapses.

The National Organization for Rare Disorders (NORD) recommends FLAIR therapy consisting of a three-agent protocol involving front-loaded high-dose ACTH, IVIg, and rituximab that was developed by the National Pediatric Myoclonus Center, and has the best-documented outcomes. Almost all patients (80-90%) show improvement with this treatment and the relapse rate appears to be about 20%.

A more detailed summary of current treatment options can be found at Treatment Options

The following medications should probably be avoided:

- Midazolam - Can cause irritability.
- Melatonin - Is known to stimulate the immune system.
- Also, see "An Innovative Approach to the Problem of Sedating Children with Opsoclonus-Myoclonus Syndrome". Pranzatelli Abstracts. for more details

== Prognosis ==
Currently, there are no clinically established laboratory investigations available to predict prognosis or therapeutic response.

Tumors in children who develop OMS tend to be more mature, showing favorable histology and absence of n-myc oncogene amplification than similar tumors in children without symptoms of OMS. Involvement of local lymph nodes is common, but these children rarely have distant metastases and their prognosis, in terms of direct morbidity and mortality effects from the tumor, is excellent. The three-year survival rate for children with non-metastatic neuroblastoma and OMS was 100% according to Children's Cancer Group data (gathered from 675 patients diagnosed between 1980 and 1994); three-year survival in comparable patients with OMS was 77%. Although the symptoms of OMS are typically steroid-responsive and recovery from acute symptoms of OMS can be quite good, children often experience lifelong neurologic sequelae that impair motor, cognitive, language, and behavioral development.

Most children will experience a relapsing form of OMS, though a minority will have a monophasic course and may be more likely to recover without residual deficits. Viral infection may play a role in the reactivation of disease in some patients who had previously experienced remission, possibly by expanding the memory B cell population. Studies have generally asserted that 70-80% of children with OMS will have long-term neurologic, cognitive, behavioral, developmental, and academic impairment. Since neurologic and developmental difficulties have not been reported as a consequence of neuroblastoma or its treatment, it is thought that these are exclusively due to the immune mechanism underlying OMS.

One study concludes that: "Patients with OMA and neuroblastoma have excellent survival but a high risk of neurologic sequelae. Favourable disease stage correlates with a higher risk for development of neurologic sequelae. The role of anti-neuronal antibodies in late sequelae of OMA needs further clarification".

Another study states that: "Residual behavioral, language, and cognitive problems occurred in the majority".

== Research ==
The National Institute of Neurological Disorders and Stroke (NINDS) conducts and supports research on various movement disorders, including opsoclonus myoclonus. These studies are focused on finding ways to prevent, treat, and cure these disorders, as well as increasing knowledge about them.

== Nomenclature ==
OMS was first described by Marcel Kinsbourne in 1962. (The term 'Opsoclonus' was coined by Orzechowski in 1913, but it was classically described and associated with neuroblastoma by Kinsbourne). Other names for OMS include:

- Dancing Eyes-Dancing Feet syndrome
- Dancing Eyes syndrome (see also Nystagmus)
- Kinsbourne syndrome
- Myoclonic Encephalopathy of Infants (MEI), not to be confused with Early myoclonic encephalopathy (EME)
- Opsoclonic Cerebellopathy
- Opsoclonus-Myoclonus-Ataxia (OMA)
- Paraneoplastic Opsoclonus-Myoclonus Ataxia (POMA)
