= Qualifying Small Enterprises =

Qualifying Small Enterprises (QSEs) are part of one of the categories of South African businesses as per the Broad Based Black Economic Empowerment Act. "The Broad-Based Black Economic Empowerment Act (53/2003): Codes of Good Practice on Black Economic Empowerment" was gazetted on 9 February 2007. The businessy with a turnover between R10 million and R50 million, as measured by using the QSE Scorecard.

== Differences between BEE for QSEs and generic (large) enterprises ==
The differences are substantial and the compliance with the measurement criteria for QSEs is far less onerous than for large enterprises. The first difference relates to the weighting of each element of the codes. For large enterprises the codes are weighted differently, with various weightings from 5% to 20%. (The section on Broad Based Black Economic Empowerment has more details.) However each category for a QSE has a weighting of 25%, and only four must be measured.

QSEs are measured in terms of Code 800 of "The Broad-Based Black Economic Empowerment Act (53/2003): Codes of Good Practice on Black Economic Empowerment" as opposed to Code 100 through 700. However, codes 100–700 provide the theoretical background upon which Code 800 is based and so it is imperative for QSEs to understand the full Act.

== Measurement ==
In terms of Code 800 of the Act, QSEs must be measured in terms of the seven pillars or elements of BEEs:

Internal Elements

- Statement 801 Ownership
- Statement 802 Management & Control
- Statement 803 Employment Equity
- Statement 804 Skills Development

External Elements

- Statement 805 Preferential Procurement
- Statement 806 Enterprise Development
- Statement 807 Socio-Economic Development

QSEs may choose their best four elements to calculate their BEE score and related B-BBEE contributor status. Each element carry a 25% weighting.

Each element has its own goals by which it measures the measured entity.

=== Statement 801: Ownership ===
Ownership is calculated as a score based on the 'Black' Shareholding as a percentage of total shareholding. It looks at three basic elements of ownership, namely: Voting Rights; Economic Interest & Ownership Fulfilment.

Voting rights refers to the capacity of 'Black' shareholders to be involved with voting and decision making within the entity. Economic interest is the benefit received by 'Black' shareholders as a percentage of dividends/distributions.

Ownership fulfilment is the actual value of ownership that a shareholder realises after liabilities are subtracted; this works on a sliding scale. For instance it is only assumed that 10% of the liability incurred to purchase shareholding would be paid off in the first year. This increases to 20% for year two, 40% for year three and four; 60% for year five and six; 80% for year 7 and 8, and 100% for year 9 onwards.

The Ownership Goals for QSEs are as follows:

| Element | Weighting | Goal |
|---|---|---|
| Voting Rights | 6 | 25%+1 Vote |
| Economic Interest | 9 | 25% |
| Ownership Fulfilment* | 1 | |
| Net Value* | 9 | |
| Bonus Points | | |
| Black Female Ownership | 2 | 10% |
| Employee Ownership Schemes | 1 | 10% |

- Ownership Fulfilment and Net Value are calculated by working out what the real ownership of a shareholder is when less liability; e.g., if a shareholder owns R1 000,000 worth of shares, but has incurred R1 000,000 worth of liability to purchase those shares, then the net-value of his ownership is zero.

=== Statement 802: Management & Control ===
A QSE's management & control score is calculated in terms of Black Top Management as a percentage of all top management. Traditionally Top Management of QSEs are the directors and executives, those who are involved in the strategic leading and decision making within the enterprise.

Note: Any Black Top Management Employees that are counted for the management & control score can not be included in the calculation of the employment equity (statement 803) score.

| Element | Weighting | Goal |
|---|---|---|
| Black Top Management | 25 | 50.1% |
| Bonus Points | | |
| Black Female Top Management | 2 | 25% |

=== Statement 803: Employment Equity ===
A QSE's Employment equity score is calculated in terms of the number of 'black' employees as a percentage of all employees. The QSE scorecard looks at two categories of employees, namely management and non-management and the score is based on goals below. (Large enterprises look only at employees in management positions to calculate their employment equity score in terms of code 300.)

Note: Any Black Top Management Employees that are counted for the management & control score cannot be included in the calculation of the employment equity (statement 803) score.

| Element | Weighting | Goal |
|---|---|---|
| Black Management* | 15 | 1000% |
| Black Employees* | 10 | 100% |
| Bonus Points | | |
| Exceeding Targets | 2 | |

- Both Targets are calculated using adjusted recognition for gender. This calculation takes place as follows:

Total Black Employees/2 + Black Female employees

E.G.: I have 5 employees, 4 black (3 male; 1 female) & 1 White Male.
My calculation is as follows:

4/2+1= 3, so 3/5 = 60% which is my measured goal

=== Statement 804: Skills Development ===
A QSE's Skills Development score is calculated based on the enterprises spend benefiting 'black' employees on qualifying skills training using adjusted recognition for gender (see above). The goal is that an enterprise should spend 6% of the leviable amount as defined by the skills development levies act of 1999. This is essentially the gross salaries and wages.

| Element | Weighting | Goal |
|---|---|---|
| Skills Spend | 25 | 6% of Gross Salaries & Wages |

=== Statement 805: Preferential Procurement ===
The Preferential Procurement score is calculated by working out the recognised BEE procurement spent as a percentage of total procurement spent. To do this an enterprise must collect all the BEE certificates of their suppliers to find out what recognition each of the suppliers offers.

Each supplier should have a certificate which indicates its B-BBEE recognition on it. If a supplier does not have a certificate it is assumed that the supplier offers a 0% recognition.

Preferential Procurement Goal

| Element | Weighting | Goal |
|---|---|---|
| Recognized Procurement | 25 | 40% |

EXAMPLE: If I have 5 Suppliers and I spend R100 on each of them

| Supplier | Certificate Level | B-BBEE Recognition | Recognized Spend |
|---|---|---|---|
| Supplier 1 | 3 | 110% | R110 |
| Supplier 2 | no Certificate | 0% | R0 |
| Supplier 3 | 4 | 100% | R100 |
| Supplier 4 | 6 | 60% | R60 |
| Supplier 5 | 8 | 10% | R10 |
| Total | | | R280 |

In this example measured entity can recognise R280 worth of my R500 spent, thus 56% of my procurement spent is recognised and they will receive full points for the element.

=== Statement 806: Enterprise Development ===
The QSE Enterprise Development score is calculated in terms of contribution towards enterprise development activities. These are contributions aimed at facilitating the sustainable growth or establishment of new "black owned" enterprises. The goal is that a measured entity spend 2% of its Net Profit After Tax (NPAT) on enterprise development activities.

| Element | Weighting | Goal |
|---|---|---|
| Enterprise Development Spend | 25 | 2% of NPAT* |

- NPAT = Net Profit After Tax

=== Statement 807: Socio-Economic Development ===
The QSE Socio-Economic Development score is calculated in terms of contribution towards socio-economic development activities. These are contributions aimed at creating sustainable access to the economy for historically disadvantaged South Africans. The goal is that a measured entity spend 1% of its Net Profit After Tax (NPAT) on enterprise development activities.

| Element | Weighting | Goal |
|---|---|---|
| Socio-Economic Development Spend | 25 | 1% of NPAT* |

- NPAT = Net Profit After Tax

== BEE strategy ==
For a QSE, complying with BEE can create substantial competitive advantage and thus have a very positive effect on the business. The competitive advantage is routed in preferential procurement because large businesses must spend 10% of their total recognised procurement on businesses with a turnover of less than R35 million.

In addition, it is relatively easy for QSEs to achieve a good BEE score, irrespective of the percentage of black ownership, because they need to measure only their four best elements.
