= South African National Accreditation System =

Official accreditation body for South Africa

- Nickname: SANAS
- Formation: 1996; 30 years ago
- Headquarters: Pretoria, Gauteng, South Africa
- Region served: South Africa
- Official language: English
- Key people: Patricia Lindi Tlou (Interim Chairperson); Farhad Osman (Acting CEO)
- Website: sanas.co.za

The South African National Accreditation System (SANAS) is the official laboratory accreditation body for South Africa. Founded in 1996, SANAS is headquartered in Pretoria, South Africa. SANAS accreditation certificates are a formal recognition by the Government of South Africa that an organisation is competent to perform specific tasks.

SANAS provides formal recognition to

- Laboratories (testing and calibration) to ISO/IEC 17025 and medical laboratories to ISO/IEC 17025 and/or ISO 15189
- Certification bodies for Quality Management Systems and Environmental Management Systems to ISO/IEC 17021 (and the IAF interpretation),
- Inspection bodies to ISO/IEC/17020.
- Proficiency testing scheme providers
- Good Laboratory Practice (GLP) test facilities for compliance to OECD GLP principles

== About SANAS ==
SANAS is located on the Department of Trade, Industry & Competition Campus in Pretoria. It is directed by a board of directors appointed by the Minister of Trade and Industry. The Board delegates to the chief executive officer (CEO) of SANAS the responsibility to implement the SANAS strategic objectives. The Approval Committees make recommendation to the CEO concerning the granting and continuation of accreditation and GLP compliance.

SANAS plays an important role in SADC by hosting the SADC Accreditation Secretariat and holding the regional coordinator position. The body is further currently assisting the newly established SADC Accreditation Services (SADCAS) by training assessors and partnering with that body. SANAS was also recently elected to host the secretariat for the newly established African Accreditation Cooperation (AFRAC), launched in support of an African technical infrastructure under the African Union.

SANAS is a founding signatory of the International Laboratory Accreditation Cooperation (ILAC) and International Accreditation Forum (IAF). For South African trade, it implies the elimination of or reduction in the need for retesting or recertification to an importing country that is a signatory to the arrangement. In 2012, the multilateral recognition arrangement (MLRA) for inspection was officially launched under ILAC. SANAS was one of the first signatories to this agreement, allowing international recognition of the inspection results of South Africa's accredited facilities.

== History ==
=== Early accreditation ===
Accreditation in South Africa started in 1980 with the formation of the National Calibration Service (NCS), later called the National Laboratory Accreditation Service (NLA). Initially the NCS, which was operated under the auspices of the CSIR, accredited laboratories only in the field of calibration.

In 1994 the NLA became an independent Section 21 company in line with international requirements pertaining to autonomy. From 1995 the NLA accredited testing laboratories, assuming responsibility for laboratories previously accredited under a South African Bureau of Standards (SABS) system.

The Department of Trade and Industry (DTI) had recognised the need to create a single national accreditation system as long ago as 1993, and the establishment of such a system was approved by Cabinet in late 1994.

During 1995 the newly independent NLA was contracted to create the South African National Accreditation System (SANAS). In July 1995, a working group was formed to finalise the organisational structure and constitution of SANAS. The new entity was registered as a Section 21 company in January 1996.

=== Founding of SANAS ===
SANAS was officially launched in August 1996.

In December 1997, SANAS and the DTI agreed to recognize SANAS as the single national authority for the accreditation of test and calibration laboratories, inspection bodies, bodies for certification of quality and environmental management systems, product conformity certification bodies. The agreement also recognized SANAS as the national monitoring authority for GLP and GCP compliant facilities.

In 1998, SANAS became fully operational. with one division in charge of the accreditation of laboratories/inspection bodies and the other division handling the accreditation of all certification bodies.

On 1 May 2007 SANAS became a public entity. By the end of 2012, SANAS had accredited more than 1400 conformity assessment bodies in South Africa.

== Entities certified by SANAS ==
=== Calibration laboratories and proficiency testing schemes ===
Calibration laboratories provide legal metrological traceability in South Africa. The laboratories form an integral part of the metrological chain whenever physical measurements are performed.

The calibration programme ensures that:

- the weights of the sugar, maize meal and flour purchased by consumers are correct.
- the accuracy of the equipment used for law enforcement, such as evidential breath analysers and speed measuring devices,
- the accuracy and traceability of measurements required within the IPAP priority sectors.

Proficiency testing is essential for the demonstration of the competency of a laboratory.

=== Testing laboratories ===
Testing laboratories provide objective evidence that a product or service offering conforms to certain customer requirements or specifications.

SANAS-accredited laboratories in the food safety sector play an important role in monitoring the quality of food for import and export purposes, as well as for the health and safety of the public at large. The testing programme also provides an accreditation service in the IPAP priority sectors and other industry sectors, including environmental monitoring, food safety, infrastructure and construction, agriculture and minerals.

=== Medical laboratories ===
Credibility of medical pathology laboratories is paramount to the health and safety of the patients who rely on the testing services provided by these laboratories. Laboratory tests are an integral part of the workup of any patient, and constitutes up to 80% of a physician's diagnosis and treatment choice. It is therefore important that the results are reliable, as medical doctors base their diagnosis on such results.

=== GLP-compliant facilities ===
SANAS is the official OECD GLP monitoring authority. The main duty of the GLP monitoring authority is to monitor compliance with GLP Principles by conducting laboratory inspections and study audits.

The OECD principles of GLP were primarily developed to promote the quality and validity of test data used to determine the safety of chemicals and chemical products.

=== Forensic laboratories ===
Forensic laboratories support criminal justice system by providing scientific analyses of physical evidence used in the investigation and prosecution of crime through the scientific examination of physical evidence.

=== Veterinary laboratories and Good Clinical Practice (GCP)-compliant facilities ===
South Africa is no exception when it comes to the problems faced by the livestock industry worldwide. It is therefore important for the country to have a large veterinary laboratory industry to help with the diagnosis of disease, especially emerging diseases such as Bovine spongiform encephalopathy and to test the safety of meat and other animal products.

=== Blood transfusion ===
The primary goal of a blood transfusion facility is the transfusion of safe units of blood. Accreditation plays a vital role in ensuring that the personnel involved in all the activities (such as donor registration, blood collection, testing, processing and storage) of a blood transfusion service are competent and that national and/or international standards are being adhered to.

=== Pharmaceutical ===
The South African pharmaceutical industry is one of the largest in Africa. The pharmaceutical or medicine industry, is one of the most returning areas for business investment. Furthermore, it plays a vital role in fighting numerous diseases in South Africa, such as TB, HIV and AIDS.

=== Inspection bodies ===
Inspection mainly operates within the regulatory domain where regulators and citizens need to be confident that inspection bodies, especially those inspecting health and safety issues in accordance with the Occupational Health and Safety (OHS) Act, are competent to do so. This also applies to bodies that are required to ensure the protection of consumers, such as the National Regulator for Compulsory Specification (NRCS) and those required under the IPAP, for example, nuclear inspection and measurement and verification agencies.

=== Verification laboratories ===
Verification laboratories fall under the domain of legal (trade) metrology, whose sole purpose is to protect consumers from unfair trade practices. These laboratories perform verifications on volume, mass and length measuring instruments to ensure reliable results.

=== Certification bodies ===
Certification is the activity of conformity assessment where the focus is on a system that forms the basic requirements to ensure that an organisation has the necessary self-regulating procedures and controls on factors that affect a product so that it is possible to provide the customer with confidence that the product falls within the specified requirements. Accredited certification bodies certify other organisations with regard to compliance to management systems with recognised standards, such as quality management system, environmental management system, food safety management system requirements, responsible tourism and greenhouse gas validation and verification. This programme, together with the Inspection Body Programme, is the key accreditation implementer for the attainment of the IPAP projects assigned to SANAS.

=== Broad-based Black Economic Empowerment (B-BBEE) verification agencies ===
In 2007, SANAS initiated the Broad-based Black Economic Empowerment Verification Accreditation Programme.
