= Ngizwe Mchunu =

South African radio personality

- Born: Nkandla, KwaZulu-Natal
- Spouse: Siphelele Nxumalo
- Presenting career
- Country: South Africa
- Previous show: Presenter on Ukhozi FM

Ngizwe Mchunu is a South African radio personality and sangoma. He was born in Nkandla, KwaZulu-Natal.

== Career ==
Mchunu was a presenter for SABC's Ukhozi FM but was fired after allegedly breaching a confidentiality policy by sharing private station information publicly. After his firing, he launched his own online radio station, Ngizwe Mchunu FM, which first aired 09:00-23:00 on 14 September 2019.

== Polygyny controversy ==
Mchunu attempted to marry three women. Although South Africa's legal system does allow for polygamous marriages under the Recognition of Customary Marriages Act, such must be done in accordance with recognised traditions, which Mchunu did not follow.

His first wife, Siphelele Nxumalo, took him to court in 2014 in an attempt to nullify his civil marriage to his third would-be wife, Floda Mthimkhulu. His marriages to his second partner Lindiwe Khuzwayo and his third partner Floda were consequently nullified by the court because Mchunu had not complied with one of the requirements of traditional African marriages, which stipulates that any man wishing to take another wife must first make an application to court to approve a written contract regulating the future matrimonial property system of the marriages.

== Incitement to commit public violence ==
Mchunu is a known supporter of former South African president Jacob Zuma. Before Zuma's arrest and imprisonment, Mchunu was seen on guard outside the former president's Nkandla homestead insisting the president would not go to jail.

Following the 2021 unrest in South Africa linked to Jacob Zuma, Mchunu was accused of instigating and urging others to commit theft and violence during a press conference made in Johannesburg, and was consequently charged with incitement to commit public violence. On 19 July 2021, he handed himself over to police. The magistrate that heard his bail application and released him considered the evidence against Mchunu to be weak but required him to hand over his passport to police in order to secure his release as they considered him a flight risk. The case was set to resume 21 October 2021.

=== Clash with EFF ===
In September 2026, Mchunu bodyguards clashed with the Economic Freedom Fighters in Durban were shots were fired. Mchunu claimed that EFF supporters provoked him and his followers. EFF supporters were preparing for the party's provincial manifesto and have opened a case at Inanda police station. Mchunu was preparing for a cultural Maskandi event also taking place in the vicinity.

== Xenophobia controversy ==
According to GroundUp Mchunu runs an anti- illegal immigrant group called Amabhinca Nation' that has participated in actions that have resulted in the deportation of documented and undocumented migrants in Durban.

== Homophobia controversy ==
Mchunu has repeatedly made homophobic statements.
