= Exempted Micro Enterprises =

In South African law, Exempted Micro Enterprises (EMEs) are businesses that are exempt from measurement in terms of the DTI's codes of Good Practice for Black Economic Empowerment (BEE). They automatically qualify as 100% contributors towards BEE, this offers small South African businesses the opportunity to grow as a result of BEE irrespective of the make-up of the shareholding.

In terms of Paragraph 4 of the DTI's "Codes of Good Practice for BEE".

== Turnover required for exemption ==
In terms of the Broad-Based Black Economic Empowerment Codes, businesses with a turnover of less than R5 Million qualify as EMEs, but in 2009, two sector charters were released that reduced the turnover required for exemption as follows:

- The Tourism & Hospitality Charter reduced the turnover required for exemption to R2.5 million for all businesses that are considered to be part of the tourism and/or hospitality industry.
- The Construction Charter reduced the turnover required for exemption to R1.5 million for Built Environment Professionals (BEPs), which "provide services related to but not limited to consulting engineering, architecture and quality surveying". Contractors are considered exempt if they have a turnover of less than R5 million.

== BEE recognition ==
For preferential procurement purposes, EMEs offer clients at least 100% BEE recognition for any purchases that the client has made from that EME. They are required to prove to the client that they qualify, which commonly takes place through the presentation of an exempt certificate.

- Businesses with a black shareholding of less than 50% automatically qualify as 100% contributors towards BEE.
- Businesses with a black shareholding of more than 50% automatically qualify as 110% contributors towards BEE.

In terms of codes of good practice, BEE-exempt certificates can be issued by verification agents or auditors/accounting offices if enough supporting evidence is available to prove exemption. EMEs obtain an affidavit from an accredited verification agency to ensure that they qualify, which should signed by the commissioner of oaths. The affidavit is used in place of the BEE certificate and is valid for 12 months from the date it is signed by the commissioner.
