= South African Bureau of Standards =

South African statutory body

Standards testing and accreditation overview
- Formed: 1 September 1945; 80 years ago
- Headquarters: Pretoria, South Africa; 25°46′10.61″S 28°12′45.53″E
- Employees: 738
- Minister responsible: Ebrahim Patel, Minister of Trade, Industry and Competition
- Standards testing and accreditation executives: Jodi Scholtz, Lead Administrator; Dr Tshenge Demana, Co-Administrator
- Parent department: Department of Trade, Industry and Competition
- Key documents: Standards Act, 1945; Standards Act, 2008
- Website: https://www.sabs.co.za/

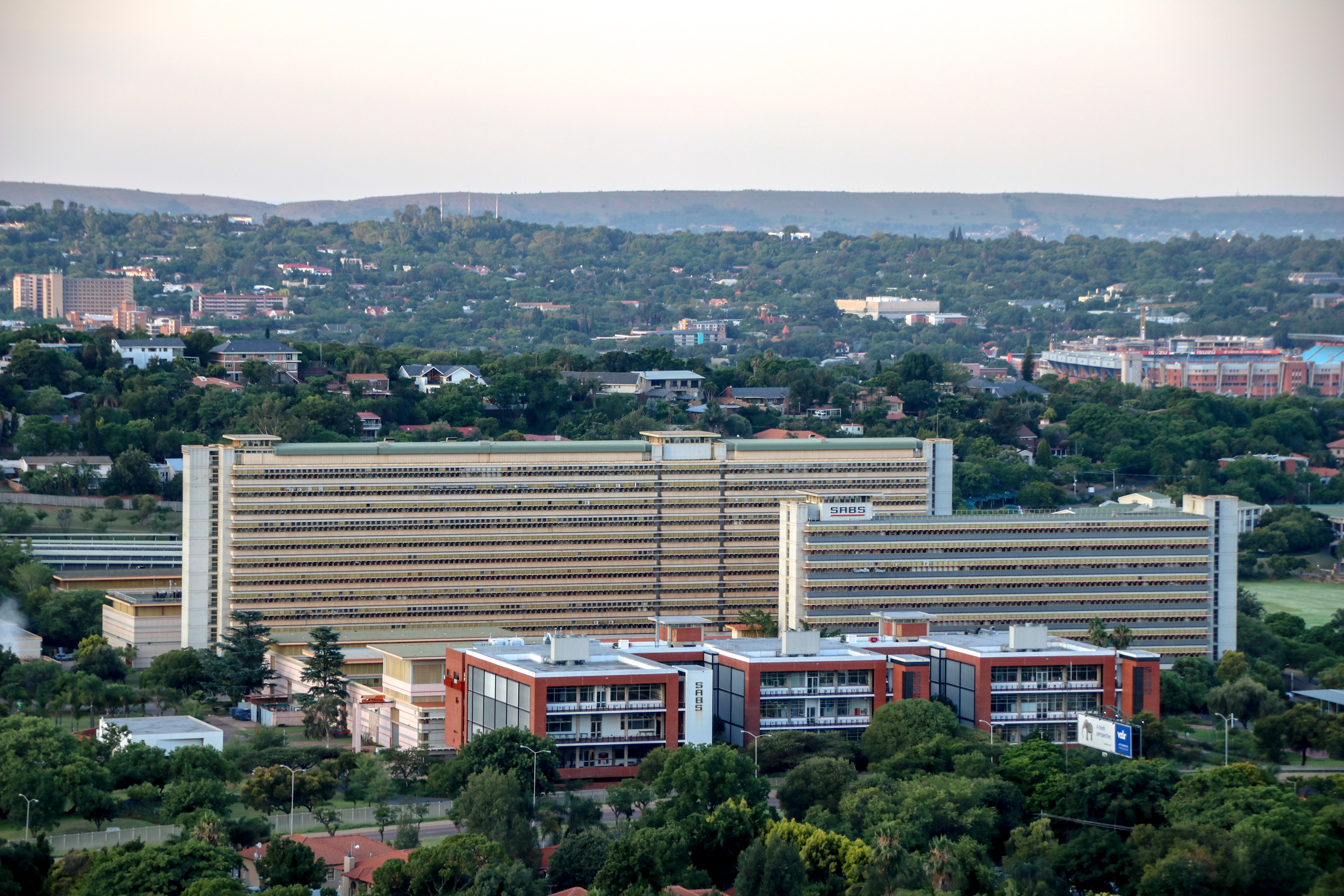
Head Office of the South African Bureau of Standards in Pretoria.

The South African Bureau of Standards (SABS) is a South African statutory body established in terms of the Standards Act (Act No. 24 of 1945). It continues to operate in terms of the latest edition of the Standards Act (Act No. 29 of 2008) as the national institution for the promotion and maintenance of standardization and quality in connection with commodities and the rendering of services.

== Function ==
The mandate of the SABS includes the development of standards for products and services in South Africa, and the facilitation of international trade.

Internationally, SABS experts represent South Africa's interests in the development of international standards, through their engagement with bodies such as the International organization for standardization (ISO) and the International Electrotechnical Commission (IEC). SABS also holds the Secretariat for SADCSTAN, the standardization body for the Southern African Development Community of 14 nations.

== Initiatives ==
=== South African initiative on reusable sanitary products ===
Coordinated by the Department of Women, Youth and Persons with Disabilities, the Sanitary Dignity Framework was created to improve menstrual hygiene. The program is intended to provide sanitary products to disadvantaged girls and women. The SABS intended to standardize the production of washable, reusable sanitary towels in August 2019. The standard was published on 6 May 2020 to regulate the production of these items.

=== Declaration on Gender-Responsive Standards and Standards Development ===
In 2019, the South African Bureau of Standards (SABS) signed the Declaration on Gender-Responsive Standards and Standards Development, which addresses women's participation and representation in standardization. The declaration was adopted by the International Organisation for Standardisation (ISO) in 2019.
