= Electromembrane extraction =

Analytical chemistry technique

Electro membrane extraction, or EME, is a miniaturized liquid-liquid extraction technique developed for sample preparation of aqueous samples prior to analysis by chromatography, electrophoresis, mass spectrometry, and related techniques in analytical chemistry. EME involves the use of a small supported liquid membrane (SLM) sustained in the wall of a porous hollow fiber, and application of an electrical field across the SLM.

== Principle ==
Target compounds are extracted from an aqueous sample, through a μL-volume of organic solvent sustained as a thin supported liquid membrane (SLM) in the pores in the wall of a porous hollow fiber, and into an acceptor solution inside the lumen of the hollow fiber. Extraction is based on electrokinetic migration in an electrical field sustained across the SLM. The volume of the acceptor solution is typically 5-25 μL. The acceptor solution is an aqueous solution, and can be analyzed by liquid chromatography (LC) or capillary electrophoresis (CE).

== Advantages ==
EME is closely related to liquid-phase microextraction (LPME) and provides high pre-concentration and efficient sample clean-up. In addition, because the extraction is performed under the influence of an electrical field, the extraction selectivity can be controlled by the direction and the magnitude of the electrical field.
