= Mineral and Petroleum Resources Development Act, 2002 =

Mineral and Petroleum Resources Development Act

Parliament of South Africa
- Long title: To make provision for equitable access to and sustainable development of the nation’s mineral and petroleum resources; and to provide for matters connected therewith.
- Assented to: 3 October 2002
- Commenced: 1 May 2004
- Status: Amended

Mineral and Petroleum Resources Development Act, 2002 (MPRDA) is an act of the Parliament of South Africa. It came into effect on May 1, 2004, and now governs the acquisition, use and disposal of mineral rights. The old common-law principles are therefore no longer applicable. The MPRDA entrenches state power and control over the mineral and petroleum resources of the country.

== See also ==
- Mining industry of South Africa
- South African property law
