= EME Temple =

Coordinates: 22.3314°N 73.1920°E

Dakshinamoorthy & Navgraha EME Temple
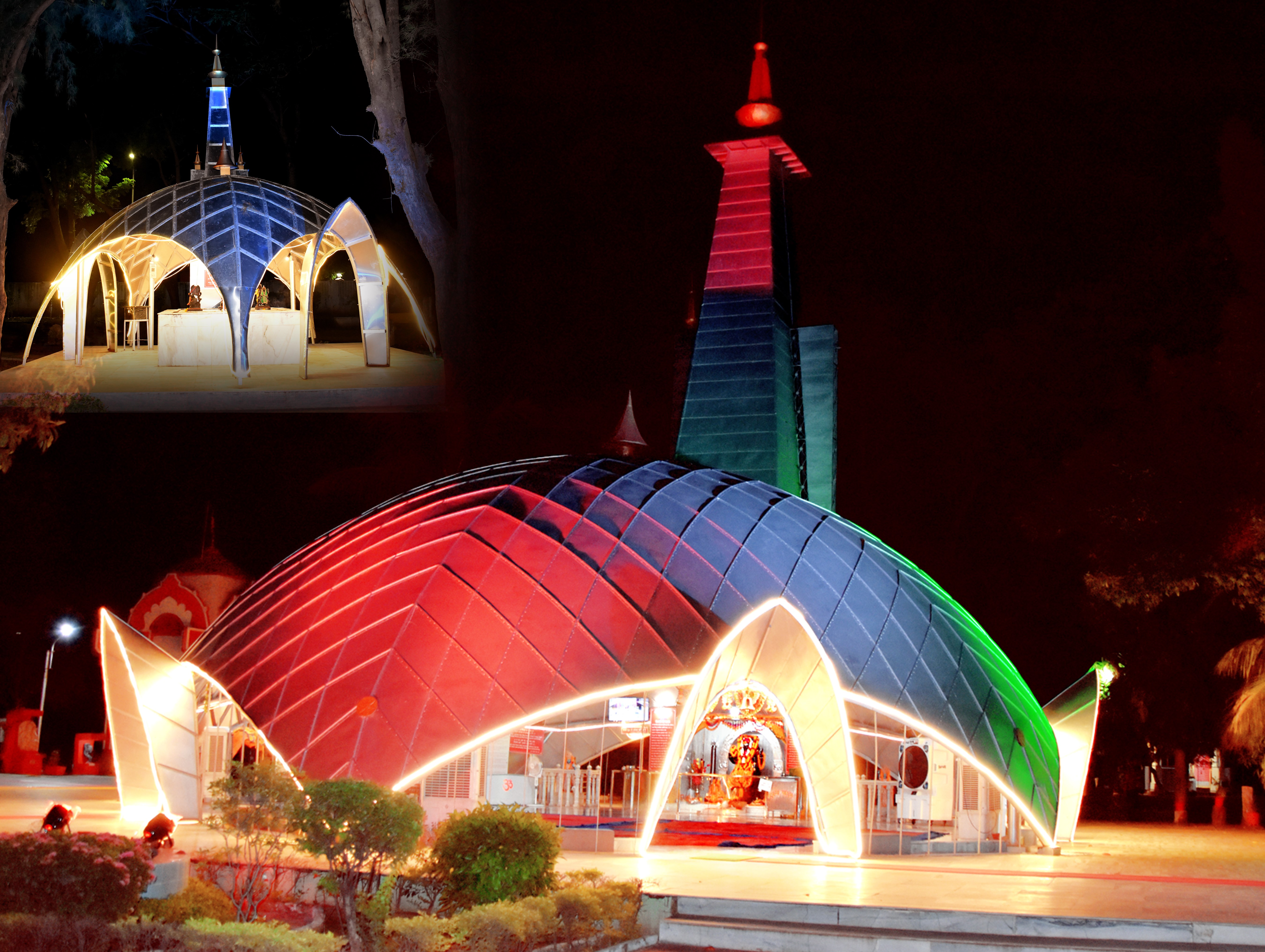
- Front view of EME Temple

Religion
- Affiliation: Hinduism
- Deity: Dakshinamoorthy (Shiva) and Navgraha
- Governing body: EME School

Location
- Location: Vadodara
- State: Gujarat
- Country: India
- Interactive map of Dakshinamoorthy & Navgraha EME Temple

Architecture
- Type: Modern architecture
- Creator: Indian Army
- Groundbreaking: 2023 Navgraha Temple
- Completed: 1966

The Dakshinamoorthy and Navgraha EME Temple is a Hindu temple dedicated to god Shiva, situated in EME School's campus in Vadodara, Gujarat, India.

It has a Navgraha temple also which is dedicated to the nine planets in Vedic astronomy. The EME Temple was built in 1966 by the Electronics & Mechanical Engineers (EME) School of Indian Army and is maintained and run by the Army in Vadodara city of Gujarat.

It has a unique design inspired by Buckminster Fuller’s geodesic dome and amalgamates elements of all major religions of the world.

The temple is a major attraction for both tourists and is one of its kind in the world. The Dakshinamoorthy & Navgraha EME Temple also has 108 major archaeological stone statues circa 600-1600 CE of various Hindu deities. The statues are placed in various open spaces of the temple and attract a large number of students of architecture and archaeological studies.

== History and significance ==
The Dakshinamoorthy EME Temple was constructed in February 1966 during the tenure of Brig AF Eugene, the first Commandant of EME School, who was himself a Christian.

The temple is a symbol of secularism in the country as it displays various features of major religions of India.

- The Kalasha on the top of the dome represents Hinduism.
- The Dome has been adopted from Islamic architecture.
- The Tower, beneath which the idol of Lord Dakshinamoorthy is situated, represents Christianity.
- The Golden structure on top of tower is according to Buddhist principles.
- The Entrance of the temple is built according to Jain religious traditions.
- The fire or Havan Kund in the temple represents Zoroastrianism.

The idol of the main deity faces South – as that is the avatar of Lord Shiva as Lord Dakshinamoorthy in which he adopted the role of a teacher and imparted his "Gyan or knowledge to the world". Other notable features include an idol of Lord Ganesha and Kartikeya, the sons of Shiva brought from Mahabalipuram and an arch behind Lord Shiva’s idol, made of pure silver and engraved with the sacred mantra Om Namah Shivaya. There is a replica of Amarnath Shivalinga, one of the most sacred shrines of Lord Shiva also in the premises.

== Navgraha temple ==
In 2023, Major General Neeraj Varshney designed and constructed the Navgraha temple as a scale replica of the main Dakshinamoorthy Temple. The idols represent the nine Vedic astrological planets and are on a raised marble platform with a Shani Shila, a sacred stone representing Saturn on which oil and sesame seeds can be poured by the devotees as per Hindu traditions.

Every year on the auspicious occasion of Maha Shivratri an Janmashtami the Dakshinamoorthy & Navgraha EME Temple is flocked by thousands of devotees for prayers and blessings. The lush green landscape with colored fountains and peaceful ambience is well maintained by Indian Army (EME School, Vadodara).

== Timing ==
The temple is open from 06.00 AM to 09.00 PM everyday for visitors and special Aarti is held at 06.45 PM on Tuesday.
