= Firearms regulation in South Africa =

Regulation of ownership and licensing of firearms

In South Africa, the Firearms Control Act 60 of 2000 regulates the possession of firearms by civilians. Possession of a firearm is conditional on a competency test and several other factors, including background checking of the applicant, inspection of an owner's premises, and licensing of the weapon by the police introduced in July 2004.

The South African government continues to codify new firearm-related laws, with the goal of protecting the general population. The regulation of firearms forms part of the mandate of the Department of Police, which is led by the Minister of Police. The Civilian Secretariat for Police Service (the Civilian Secretariat) serves as a technical advisory body to the Minister.

In 2010, the process was undergoing review, as the South African Police Service (SAPS) was not able to process competency certifications, new licenses, or renewal of existing licenses in a timely manner. The minimum waiting period used to exceed 2 from the date of application.

The Central Firearms Registry implemented a turnaround strategy that has significantly improved the processing period of new licences. As of 2012, the maximum time allowed to process a license application is currently 90 days.

== Current law ==
In South Africa, citizens or permanent residents (over the age of 21 years generally, but if need can be shown then technically no age limit applies) who wish to own firearms are required to obtain a licence per individual firearm, and may possess a maximum number of only four firearms, and a maximum of 200 rounds of ammunition per licence.

Should the individual acquire 'dedicated status' conferred by registered shooting club, the individual can theoretically license an unlimited number of firearms and ammunition limits also then fall away.

=== Requirements to own a firearm ===
The requirements to own a firearm in South Africa are:

1. 21 years or older
2. Is a South African Citizen or is a permanent resident in South Africa
3. Is a fit and proper person to possess a firearm
4. Is of stable mental condition and not inclined to violence
5. Is not dependant on any substances that has an intoxicating or narcotic effect (drugs, alcohol etc.)
6. Has not been convicted of certain crimes
7. Completed the prescribed test on knowledge of the Firearms Control Act 60 of 2000
8. Completed the prescribed training and practical tests

Jointly, point 7 and 8 form the main application process.

==== Competency Certificate ====
There are 4 firearm types that a citizen can do a competency certificate for: Handguns, Shotguns, Semi-automatic rifles and Bolt action rifles. The competency itself consists of 2 parts, the exams and the proficiency shoot. There are 2 exams that need to be completed. The first is the Law exam that tests knowledge of the Firearms control act.

The second is an exam that tests the proficiency of the learner for the firearm they are applying for. The exams are usually broken down into 2 parts, an open book exam where the learner is free to read the provided material and a closed book exam done at an accredited training provider or the Professional Firearm Training Council. The exam material consists of information on handling, firing, cleaning, loading and unloading and ammunition.

The proficiency shoot is where the learner actually fires the firearm at a target and is required to hit the target with the required number of shots without missing. While firing the instructor evaluates the handling of the firearm by the learner to confirm the learner is abiding by the required Gun safety rules.

=== Prohibited firearms ===
Prohibited firearms are:

- any fully automatic firearm;
- cannon, recoilless gun, mortar, light mortar or launcher manufactured to fire a rocket, grenade, self-propelled grenade, bomb or explosive device;
- any frame, body or barrel of such a fully automatic firearm, cannon, recoilless gun, mortar, light mortar or launcher;
- any projectile or rocket manufactured to be discharged from a cannon, recoilless gun or mortar, or rocket launcher;
- any imitation of any device contemplated above;
  - the mechanism of which has been altered so as to enable the discharging of more than one shot with a single depression of the trigger;
  - the caliber of which has been altered without the written permission of the Registrar;
  - the barrel length of which has been altered without the written permission of the Registrar;

=== Semi-automatic rifles and shotguns ===
Semi-automatic firearms are not prohibited under law. However, semi-automatic long guns are only permitted with a business licence, restricted firearms licence for self-defence, and dedicated hunting and shooting licences. There is no official magazine capacity restriction for semi-automatic rifles.

=== Handguns ===
Handguns of all firing actions (except fully automatic) are legal under all licences. There is no magazine capacity restriction for handguns.

=== Carrying of firearms in public ===
Carrying legally owned firearms in South Africa is legal under all licence types and requires no additional permit. No person may carry a firearm in a public place unless the firearm is carried:

- in the case of a handgun:
  - in a holster or similar holder designed, manufactured or adapted for the carrying of a handgun and attached to his or her person; or
  - in a rucksack or similar holder; or
- in the case of any other firearm, in a holder designed, manufactured or adapted for the carrying of the firearm.

Additionally, the firearm must be completely covered and the person carrying the firearm must be able to exercise effective control over such firearm.

=== Prohibited places (Firearm-free zones) ===
In South Africa, private guns are prohibited by law as per the Control of Access to Public Premises and Vehicles Act of 1985 (CAPPVA), in government buildings.

The Firearms Control Act of 2000 does allow for firearm-free zones, but this must not be confused with the mandate of the CAPPVA of 1985, which has effectively made all government buildings and vehicles firearm-free by law without the input of the FCA which came about almost two decades later. According to the Firearms Control Act of 2000 under Section 140, firearm-free zones can be applied for and must be granted FFZ status by the Minister of Police.

It is worth noting the difference between Gun Free Zones (GFZ) and a Firearm Free Zones (FFZ). GFZ's are more voluntary and according to Gun Free SA "It is a civil offence to contravene the Gun Free Zone status of a premises, which means that anyone found breaking that law can be prosecuted under the laws that prohibit trespassing. Signs tell people entering this type of Gun Free Zone that the space is gun free. People entering this space are not asked to declare if they are carrying a gun and are not searched for a gun. While guns are not taken away from people, they know that guns are not welcome."

FFZ's on the other hand are enforced by law and carry severe penalties of up to 25 years in prison. According to Section 140 of the Firearms Control Act of 2000, police may without warrant, search any building or premises if there's reasonable suspicion that a firearm or ammunition may be present within an FFZ; search any person within an FFZ; and seize any firearm or ammunition present within an FFZ.

On the 7th of May 2004, the Minister of Police issued the notice 749 of 2004 in the Government Gazette of new legislation that declared all schools and other learning institutions, including institutions for higher education, as firearm-free zones in terms of Section 140 of the Firearms Control Act of 2000, which came into operation on the 1st of July 2004. To date, there have been no firearm-free zones declared by the Minister.

=== New legislation ===
In May 2025, the South African Department of Trade, Industry and Competition gazetted (tabled) draft proposals to ban the import of “blank” guns into South Africa, as they have become common features in criminal activity. Blank guns are realistic and functional recreations of firearms, that are designed to shoot non-lethal rounds, known as “blanks”. They are often used for legitimate purposes, like training, however, the South African Police Service (SAPS) has noted that these replicas are frequently being used in criminal activities, especially robberies and hijackings.

The rise in blank guns being used in crimes is as a result of their realistic appearance, making them effective tools for intimidating victims. They are also much easier to acquire, and have historically not come under close scrutiny. Importantly, the Department noted that these guns can also be illegally modified to fire live ammunition, turning them into lethal weapons.

The Department stated that what makes policing of blank guns difficult is the fact that they are not currently fully regulated in terms of the Firearms Control Act, 2000, especially when it comes to the possession of the guns. SAPS approached the International Trade Commission of South Africa with a request for the immediate imposition of controls on the import of blank guns.

== Licence types ==
=== Licence to possess firearm for self-defence ===
This licence allows the holder to possess any:

- shotgun which is not fully or semi-automatic; or
- handgun which is not fully automatic.

The Registrar may issue a licence under this section to any natural person who:

- needs a firearm for self-defence; and
- cannot reasonably satisfy that need by means other than the possession of a firearm.

=== Licence to possess firearm for occasional hunting and sports-shooting ===
This licence allows the holder to possess any:

- handgun which is not fully automatic;
- rifle or shotgun which is not fully or semi-automatic;

The Registrar may issue a licence in terms of this section to any:

- natural person who is an occasional hunter or occasional sports person (ex. A person who participates in target shooting but is not an official member of an official target shooting club or a person who participates in hunting but is not an official member of an official hunting club)

=== Licence to possess firearm for dedicated hunting and dedicated sports-shooting ===
This licence allows the holder to possess any:

- handgun which is not fully automatic;
- rifle which is not fully automatic;
- shotgun which is not fully automatic;
- semi-automatic shotgun;

The Registrar may issue a licence in terms of this section to any:

- natural person who is a dedicated hunter or dedicated sports person. In order to be classified as a dedicated hunter or sports shooter they need to provide a sworn statement from a chairperson of an accredited hunting or sports shooting organisation when applying for the licence.

=== Permit to possess ammunition in private collection ===
This permit allows the holder to possess any:

- piece or pieces of firearms ammunition (NOTE: Not required for people who have licences for other guns)

=== Licence to possess firearm for business purposes ===
This licence allows the holder to possess any:

- firearm that isn't prohibited

The Registrar may issue a licence in terms of this section to:

- a security company;
- a person who is accredited to provide training in the use of firearms;
- a person who is accredited to provide firearms for use in theatrical, film or television productions;
- a person who is accredited as a professional hunter;
- a person who is accredited to conduct business in hunting; or
- any person who is accredited to use firearms for such other business purpose as the Registrar may determine

== Illegal possession ==
Official statistics show that more than 12,900 people were arrested for possessing illegal firearms from 2020 to 2021. The Democratic Alliance party alleges that more than 3,400 police firearms had been unaccounted for during the five years preceding 2022.

Following a spate of shootings in July 2022 that killed 22 persons using weapons such as AK-47 rifles, South Africa Police Minister Bheki Cele said they would search house to house to find illegal guns.
