= Early myoclonic encephalopathy =

- Specialty: Neurology

Early myoclonic encephalopathy (EME) - now referred to as Early Infantile Developmental and Epileptic Encephalopathy (EIDEE) - is a rare neonatal-onset epilepsy developmental and epileptic encephalopathy (DEE) with an onset at neonatal period or during the first 3 months of life. This syndrome is now included as part of the Early infantile developmental and epileptic encephalopathy (EIDEE) under the 2022 ILAE (International League Against Epilepsy) syndrome classification.

== Epidemiology ==
The prevalence estimates among EME are of <1 / 1 000 000.
