= Wealth inequality in South Africa =

A shanty town on the outskirts of Caledon, Western Cape

According to the World Bank, South Africa is the most economically unequal country in the world. The difference between the wealthy and the poor in South Africa has been increasing steadily since the end of apartheid in 1994, and this inequality is closely linked to racial divisions in society. The reason for South Africa's economic inequality being closely linked to racial divisions is due to historic systems of racial hierarchy. The system of Apartheid that existed in South Africa before 1994 concentrated power in the hands of the white minority who used this power to deny economic opportunity to the black majority. For example, the Apartheid regime barred Blacks from working and living in cities to keep them out of skilled labour positions. This ban was only lifted in 1973 due to shortages of workers in the manufacturing sector. This system of denying Blacks economic opportunity resulted in significant economic inequality that persists to the present day and can be seen in all sectors including land ownership, educational opportunities, recreational spaces, housing and jobs.

== Background ==
South Africa's Gini coefficient has remained high since 1982 and has proven to be noticeably higher than countries with similar characteristics. For example, South Africa has a Gini coefficient of 63 (highest), the United States is at 41.5, and Ukraine stands with a score of 25 (lowest). Although Brazil and South Africa are often placed in the same category in terms of wealth and income inequality, Brazil has seen more positive results in recent years. In Brazil's case, its Gini coefficient decreased from 59.3 in 2001 to 53.1 in 2011; this is double the rate of South Africa.

The top 20% of the population in most countries holds a median of 47% of the income, whereas in South Africa, the top 20% of the population holds nearly 70% of the income. The remainder is mostly made up of the middle class, and collectively, both the top 20% and the middle class leave less than 5% of the income for the bottom 20% of the population.

== South African economics ==
=== Dualism ===
South Africa governs a dual economy. One part of the country is structured around an advanced capitalist economy. The other "dual" or divided aspect of the country regards the structure as consistent with an underdeveloped country, mostly of the black population. In South Africa, this idea is known as the first (capitalist, high-profit industries) and second (underdeveloped) economies. The first economy contributes to the majority of South Africa's wealth and is integrated within the world economy. The second economy consists of low-skilled and outdated jobs. There is little connection between these two economies, as it complies with the simplest form of the dual economy definition, which is to be divided. This disconnection refers to an economic division and contributes to a social division. The second economy does not contribute to economics on a global scale and serves the purpose of offering increasingly low-paying jobs.

=== Current economic status ===
A residential area in Khayelitsha, a township in Cape Town

Historically, South Africa has relied heavily on its mining and agricultural industries, but globalization has altered this. Now, the mining and agriculture industries have been labeled as part of the second economy of South Africa. The mining and agriculture industries have been left behind with the modern wave of advanced technology, global trade, and the financial sector of South Africa. As the capitalist financial sector in South Africa has established an important role on a global scale, it has grown since apartheid. At the same time, the second economy industries have fallen, along with much of the black population that made up the declining industries. According to the Department of Statistics of South Africa (Stats SA), the unemployment rate stood at 29.1% in the 2019 survey. Between Q2 and Q3 in 2019, the number of unemployed persons increased as the agriculture and mining industries reported 38,000 unemployed. As the number of unemployed persons has increased (expected to be higher after the analysis of COVID-19's effect) in the second economy industries, the first economy has seen positive charts, instead of negative. In a different quarterly analysis in 2019 (quarter 4), Stats SA reported that South Africa's non-agricultural sector added 16,000 jobs, which increased the number of persons employed in the formal non-agricultural sector up to 10.2 million. In this same quarter 4 of 2019 analysis, the trend continued to be positive for the trade industries, adding 29,000 additional jobs. The business service industry reported 12,000 additional jobs as well.

== Difference in racial groups ==
The black population stands at 80.6% of the population, the Coloured category makes up 8.8%, the whites make up 8.1%, and Asians including Indians make up 2.5%. Data made available by CNN presented that black South Africans earn less than the average wage of white South Africans, who make up the overwhelming majority of the workforce population. Data shows that the widening and intergenerational gap is disproportionately affecting the black South Africans. The World Bank estimates that South Africa would need to double the number of jobs created every year to see a significant reduction. The service sector dominates the homogenous workforce, and the low-skilled manufacturing or agricultural jobs are declining. South Africa is on track to produce a more polarized country in multiple categories, leaving the lower-income classes with less opportunity to grow and a lack of exposure to education or other ingredients for growth across generations.

The chart below, conducted by Stats SA, measures the labor market trends between the black and white population groups in South Africa:

Black African:

Year	Not economically active	Employed	Unemployed	Unemployment rate
2011	46.8	38.0	15.2	28.6
2012	46.2	38.6	15.3	28.3
2013	45.5	29.3	15.2	27.9
2014	45.1	39.5	15.5	28.1
2015	43.2	40.6	16.2	28.5
2016	42.8	40.0	17.3	30.2
2017	41.6	40.3	18.1	31.0

White:

Year	Not economically active	Employed	Unemployed	Unemployment rate
2011	31.6	64.4	4.0	5.8
2012	32.3	63.8	3.9	5.8
2013	31.8	63.6	4.6	6.8
2014	32.4	62.6	5.0	7.4
2015	31.7	63.7	4.6	6.8
2016	32.3	63.0	4.7	6.9
2017	31.7	63.7	4.5	6.7
