= Department of Trade, Industry and Competition =

South African national governmental department

- List: 10 other official names: Departement van Handel en Nywerheid (Afrikaans); umNyango wezeRhwebo namaBubulo (Southern Ndebele); iSebe lezoRhwebo noShishino (Xhosa); uMnyango Wezohwebo Nezimboni (Zulu); Litiko Letekuhwebelana Netetimboni (Swazi); Kgoro ya Bogwebi le Bohlagiši (Northern Sotho); Lefapha la Kgwebisano le Indasteri (Sotho); Lefapha la Kgwebisano le Madirelo (Tswana); Ndzawulo ya Mabindzu na Vumaki (Tsonga); Muhasho wa Mbambadzo na Nḓowetshumo (Venda)

Department overview
- Formed: 1 April 2020; 6 years ago
- Preceding agencies: Department of Trade and Industry; Economic Development Department
- Jurisdiction: Government of South Africa
- Headquarters: The dti Campus, 77 Meintjies Street, Sunnyside, Pretoria; 25°45′02″S 28°12′00″E
- Employees: 1,154 (2026/27)
- Annual budget: R11.69 billion (2026/27)
- Ministers responsible: Parks Tau, Minister of Trade, Industry and Competition; John Steenhuisen, Deputy Minister of Trade, Industry and Competition
- Department executives: Acting Director-General of Trade and Industry; Malebo Mabitje-Thompson
- Key document: Competition Act, 1998
- Website: thedtic.gov.za

The Department of Trade, Industry and Competition (DTIC) is a department of the South African national government, and is responsible for commercial and industrial policy, thereby developing the South African economy.

More specifically, the dtic aims to build a South African economy that is dynamic, industrial, and globally competitive, as well as one that is inclusive and offers decent employment and equity.

Previously known as the Department of Trade and Industry (DTI), the department and its subsidiary agencies are involved in promoting economic development, Black Economic Empowerment, implementing commercial law (including companies law and intellectual property law), promoting and regulating international trade, and consumer protection.

The department is led by the Minister of Trade and Industry, who is assisted by a Deputy Minister. As of 2026, the Minister is Parks Tau of the ANC, and the Deputy Minister is John Steenhuisen of the DA. The executive head of the department is the Director-General of Trade and Industry.

== History ==
The DTIC was formed in 2020, through the merger of the former Department of Trade and Industry (DTI) and the Economic Development Department (EDD). The Presidency announced the merger in 2019, and it took effect on 1 April 2020.

== Structure ==
The DTIC group consists of 18 entities, organized into regulators, development finance institutions, and standards institutions.

=== Development finance institutions ===
- Export Credit Insurance Corporation (ECIC)
- Industrial Development Corporation (IDC)
- National Empowerment Fund (NEF)

=== Regulatory institutions ===
- Companies and Intellectual Property Commission (CIPC)
- Companies Tribunal
- Competition Commission
- Competition Tribunal
- National Consumer Commission (NCC)
- Consumer Tribunal
- International Trade Administration Commission (ITAC)
- National Credit Regulator (NCR)
- National Gambling Board (NGB)
- National Lotteries Commission (NLC)
- Takeover Regulation Panel

=== Standards institutions ===
- National Metrology Institute of South Africa (NMISA)
- National Regulator for Compulsory Specifications (NRCS)
- South African Bureau of Standards (SABS)
- South African National Accreditation System (SANAS)

== Important legislation ==
The DTIC is guided by numerous major pieces of legislation, including:

- The Competition Act, 1998
- The International Trade Administration Act, 2002
- The Broad-Based Black Economic Empowerment Act, 2003
- The Companies Act, 2008
- The Consumer Protection Act, 2008
- The Special Economic Zones Act, 2014

== Investment in startups ==
In May, 2024, the Microsoft AI Startup initiative and the DTIC agreed to a R1.32 billion investment for skills development in emerging technologies among black-owned SMMEs. The investment was intended to prepare South African startups for the "fourth industrial revolution".

== See also ==
- Economy of South Africa
