= Hlengiwe Mkhaliphi =

South African politician

Hlengiwe Mkhaliphi MP
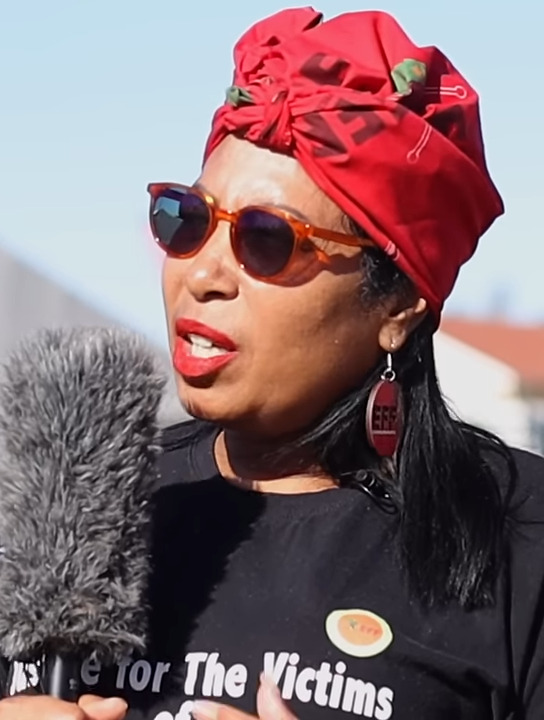
- Mkhaliphi in August 2024

Deputy Secretary-General of the Economic Freedom Fighters
- In office 15 December 2014 – 14 December 2019
- President: Julius Malema
- Preceded by: Post established
- Succeeded by: Poppy Mailola

Member of the National Assembly of South Africa
- Incumbent
- Assumed office 21 May 2014

Personal details
- Born: Hlengiwe Octavia Hlophe-Maxon
- Party: Economic Freedom Fighters
- Education: University of South Africa
- Occupation: Member of Parliament
- Profession: Politician

Hlengiwe Octavia Mkhaliphi (née Hlophe-Maxon) is a South African politician who has been serving as a Member of the National Assembly since May 2014. Mkhaliphi is a founding member of the Economic Freedom Fighters and served as the party's inaugural deputy secretary-general from 2014 until 2019.

== Education ==
Mkhaliphi received a Bachelor of Administration Honours in Public Administration from the University of South Africa in April 2019.

== Political career ==
Mkhaliphi is a founding member of the Economic Freedom Fighters, a party that was established in July 2013 and is currently led by Julius Malema. She was elected as one of the party's first parliamentarians in May 2014. In December of that same year, she was elected as the party's inaugural deputy secretary-general.

Mkhaliphi returned to Parliament following the 2019 general election. At the party's December conference, she was nominated for a second term as deputy secretary-general, but she declined the nomination. Poppy Mailola was elected to succeed her. She was re-elected to the National Assembly in the 2024 general election.

== Personal life ==
Mkhaliphi married in October 2016. The party's Twitter account tweeted about it with "#revolutionarywedding".
