= Vuyani Pambo =

South African politician (born 1989)

Vuyani Pambo MP
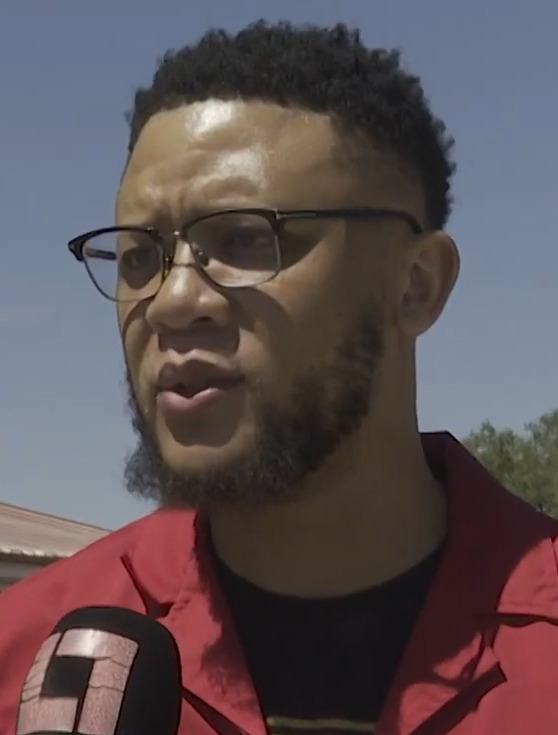
- Pambo in January 2025

Member of the National Assembly
- Incumbent
- Assumed office 22 May 2019

National Spokesperson of the Economic Freedom Fighters
- In office February 2020 – February 2022 Serving with Delisile Ngwenya
- President: Julius Malema
- Preceded by: Mbuyiseni Ndlozi
- Succeeded by: Leigh-Ann Mathys; Sinawo Tambo

Personal details
- Born: 12 August 1989 (age 36) Diepkloof, Soweto; Transvaal, South Africa
- Party: Economic Freedom Fighters
- Education: St David's Marist, Inanda
- Alma mater: University of the Witwatersrand

Vuyani Pambo (born 12 August 1989) is a South African politician and former student activist. He has represented the Economic Freedom Fighters (EFF) in the National Assembly since May 2019 and serves as the head of the EFF presidency. He rose to political prominence as a leader of the Fees Must Fall movement at the University of the Witwatersrand, where he was the head of the EFF Student Command. A member of the EFF Central Command since December 2019, he also served as the party's national spokesperson between February 2020 and February 2022.

== Early life and education ==
Pambo was born in 1989 in Diepkloof, Soweto, where he was raised by a single mother. He attended St David's Marist on a scholarship. At the University of the Witwatersrand, he completed a Bachelor's degree in African literature and international relations before pursuing a Bachelor of Laws.

== EFF Student Command ==
Pambo became politically active through the Black Consciousness Movement and, as a law student at Wits, was attracted to the Economic Freedom Fighters (EFF) because its supported land redistribution. He became the inaugural chairperson of the Wits branch of the EFF Students Command (EFFSC) when it was launched in 2013. The following year, he and 11 other EFF members occupied the office of Adam Habib, the Wits vice-chancellor, as part of a protest demanding the EFFSC's registration as an official student society.

As Wits EFFSC chairperson, Pambo was involved in launching the Fees Must Fall protest at Wits in October 2015. He remained a pivotal figure in the movement, including when it was rekindled in 2016. The Mail & Guardian described Pambo and Mcebo Dlamini as "populist leaders," dependent on "well-worn revolutionary sloganeering and confrontational antics," and political commentator Justice Malala later criticised Pambo for propagating "the politics of spectacle and destruction" in the students' movement. Pambo's role in the protests is captured in two documentary films: Aryan Kaganof's Decolonising Wits and Rehad Desai's Everything Must Fall.

== National Assembly ==
In March 2019, the EFF announced that it had nominated Pambo as a candidate for election to the Parliament of South Africa. He was ranked 31st on the EFF's national party list – one place behind fellow Fees Must Fall activist Naledi Chirwa. Pambo, then serving as the party's elections coordinator, won a seat in the National Assembly in the May 2019 election. In addition, in December 2019, he was elected to a five-year term on the party's 40-member Central Command Team.

After the party's next plenum in Centurion in February 2020, Pambo was appointed as the national spokesperson of the EFF, replacing longstanding incumbent Mbuyiseni Ndlozi. He served in that position alongside Delisile Ngwenya. In February 2022, he and Ngwenya were replaced by Leigh-Ann Mathys and Sinawo Tambo; Pambo became head of the office of the EFF presidency under EFF leader Julius Malema.

In November 2021, Malema said that Pambo would face internal disciplinary action after he missed the deadline to declare his financial interests to Parliament.

Paulsen had been ranked 15th on the EFF's national list and 7th on the EFF's Gauteng regional-to-national list for the 2024 general election. He was re-elected to parliament on the EFF national list.

== Personal life ==
According to Pambo, he is fluent in most of South Africa's 11 official languages. He was hijacked in Diepkloof in June 2022.
