= Mbuyiseni Ndlozi =

South African politician (born 1985)

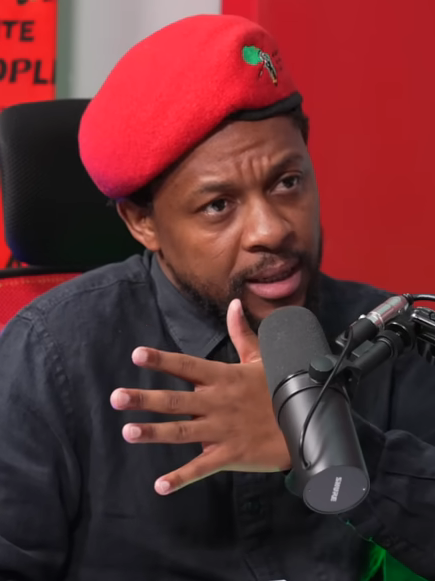
- Ndlozi in April 2024

Member of the National Assembly of South Africa
- In office 21 May 2014 – 9 January 2025
- Constituency: Mpumalanga

National Spokesperson of the Economic Freedom Fighters
- In office 26 July 2013 – 17 February 2020
- President: Julius Malema
- Preceded by: Position established
- Succeeded by: Vuyani Pambo

Personal details
- Born: Mbuyiseni Quintin Ndlozi; 9 May 1985 (age 41) Evaton, Gauteng, South Africa
- Party: Independent
- Other political affiliations: Economic Freedom Fighters (2013–2025); African National Congress (1992–2013)
- Spouse: Mmabatho Montsho
- Education: University of the Witwatersrand (PhD)
- Occupation: Politician; activist

Dr.Mbuyiseni Quintin Ndlozi MP (born 9 May 1985) is a South African politician, radio host and political activist. He was a Member of the National Assembly, representing the Economic Freedom Fighters, from 2014 until his resignation in January 2025. He also served as the first official spokesperson for the party until his resignation in 2020. He was replaced as party spokesperson by fellow member of the Economic Freedom Fighters, youth activist Vuyani Pambo. In February 2025 Ndlozi officially resigned from the EFF as a member and party politics.

== Early life ==
Ndlozi grew up in Gauteng in the Vaal area of Evaton. He was brought into political consciousness in 1992 when his uncle was jailed by the apartheid police force for his involvement in the underground activities of the liberation movement.

His own participation in mainstream politics came in the form of participation in youth movements while he was a student at the University of the Witwatersrand. He joined the South African Students Congress (SASCO), the African National Congress Youth League (ANCYL), and the Young Communist League (YCL). Ndlozi served in the Palestinian and Cuban international solidarity movements. In 2013, he was involved in the “No Obama Campaign” that was initiated by some youth political congresses in the country..

In 2017, he completed his PhD in political studies at the University of the Witwatersrand.

== Political career ==
In joining the Fifth Parliament as a new MP, he said: "I am looking forward to making sure that strict accountability is revived on the executive, that Parliament returns to the people – that the people follow Parliament's developments and that as MPs we represent the citizens and their interests well. I hope in the next five years, to expose that the ruling party has no ideological framework to take South Africa beyond the political freedoms it won and that instead, under pressure from the opposition, it will start to undermine these freedoms. Above all, I want to show that an agenda, based only on seven cardinal pillars of the EFF, can take South Africa to economic freedom and sustainable development."

Ndlozi, Julius Malema and now MK Party member Floyd Shivambu, along with the rest of the Economic Freedom Fighters parliamentary members, were thrown out of parliament for disrespecting president Jacob Zuma during his State of The Nation Address in 2015 and 2016. They have subsequently, at other sittings of the House, been removed from the National Assembly by the Parliamentary Protection Services. The EFF's removal from the National Assembly relates to the South African Constitutional Court finding that President Jacob Zuma had failed to respect and uphold the Constitution of the Republic of South Africa. In the sitting of the National Assembly from which the EFF were ejected the premise of the disruption by the EFF had been the ineligibility of President Jacob Zuma to address the National Assembly as the EFF believed the judgement by the Constitutional Court of South Africa had illustrated the flouting of the oath of office which give the President his authority of office and therefore standing in the National Assembly.

Following the South African team's victory at the 2019 Rugby World Cup he stated that only the black players deserved praise for the win and that the white players could seek praise from the United Kingdom.

== Controversy ==
Ndlozi and EFF president Julius Malema were involved in an alleged assault of a police officer at Winnie-Madikizela-Mandela's funeral in 2018. The National Prosecuting Authority submitted that they are ready to proceed with charges of common assault against Ndlozi and Malema.

Ndlozi defended the actions of EFF members during the Clicks Protests, whereby an EFF group of men harassed and pushed a female interviewer when she attempted to conduct an interview with protestors. The South African National Editors’ Forum (Sanef) criticized the actions of the EFF members as "appalling" and "misogynistic". The Commission for Gender Equality (CGE) stated that it would investigate a complaint after Ndlozi defended the harassment of a female journalist. Ndlozi described the incident as "merely touching" the interviewer, but summarily retracted the statement after public outcry regarding GBV and after a complaint was instituted at the CGE. The CGE took note of Ndlozi's apology.

In November 2024, there were reports that Nldozi had been barred from attending the EFF's third elective conference the following month; these reports were however dismissed by EFF Secretary-General Marshall Dlamini. Nonetheless, Ndlozi did not attend the conference, which sparked speculation over his future in the party. On 9 January 2025, the EFF released a statement in which they revealed that Ndlozi had resigned as a Member of Parliament.

== Education ==
Ndlozi started his humanities degree at the University of Witwatersrand in 2004. He obtained his PhD in political science from Wits in 2017.

== Awards ==
Ndlozi has been named the Most Influential Young South African for 2017.
