= Marshall Dlamini =

South African politician (born 1977)

Marshall Dlamini MP
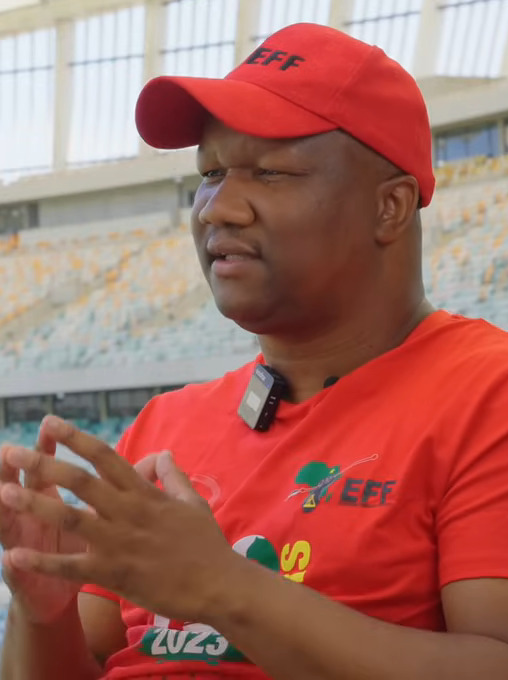
- Dlamini in 2024

Secretary-general of the Economic Freedom Fighters
- Incumbent
- Assumed office 14 December 2019
- President: Julius Malema
- Deputy: Leigh-Ann Mathys; Poppy Mailola
- Preceded by: Godrich Gardee

Member of the National Assembly of South Africa
- Incumbent
- Assumed office 21 April 2015

Personal details
- Born: Marshall Mzingisi Dlamini; 13 August 1977 (age 48)
- Party: Economic Freedom Fighters (2013–present)
- Other political affiliations: African National Congress (former)
- Occupation: Member of Parliament
- Profession: Businessman; Politician
- Committees: Portfolio Committee on Mineral Resources and Energy

Marshall Mzingisi Dlamini (born 13 August 1977) is a South African businessman and politician who was elected the secretary-general of the Economic Freedom Fighters in December 2019. He has been a member of the National Assembly since April 2015. Dlamini has been an EFF member since its inception in July 2013.

== Political career ==
Dlamini was previously involved in the African National Congress and its youth league. He was close to the league's former Secretary-General Sindiso Magaqa.

He became a member of the EFF in the early days of the party. He was at the party's launch at Uncle Tom's Hall in Soweto in July 2013. He was elected to serve on the Central Command Team, the party's highest decision-making structure.

He became a member of the National Assembly in April 2015 following the expulsion of multiple EFF MPs. He was re-elected for a second term in May 2019.

Before the EFF's second leadership conference in December 2019, The Sunday Times reported that supporters of the EFF president, Julius Malema, had begun to lobby for Dlamini to succeed the incumbent secretary-general, Godrich Gardee. At the conference, Dlamini was elected unopposed to the position. he was re-elected for a second term in December 2024.

== Incident ==
In February 2019, following the State of the Nation Address, Dlamini physically assaulted a member of the presidential security team due to a conflict between EFF MPs and the security.
