= Mbuyiseni =

Mbuyiseni is a South African masculine given name. Notable people with the surname include:

- Mbuyiseni Ndlozi (born 1985), South African politician
- Oswald Mbuyiseni Mtshali (born 1940), South African poet
