= Poppy Mailola =

South African politician

Poppy Mailola MP
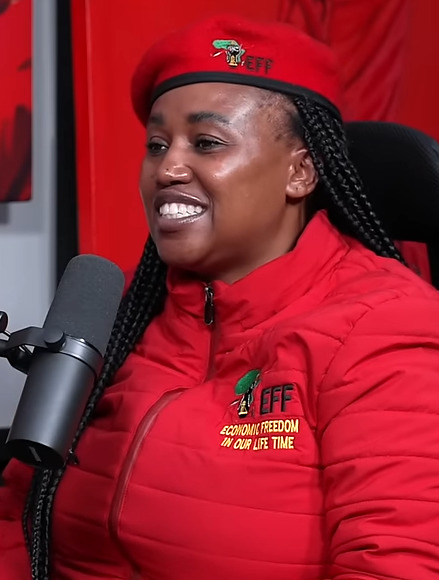
- Mailola in 2024

Deputy Secretary-General of the Economic Freedom Fighters
- In office 14 December 2019 – 14 December 2024
- President: Julius Malema
- Preceded by: Hlengiwe Mkhaliphi
- Succeeded by: Leigh-Ann Mathys

Member of the National Assembly of South Africa
- Incumbent
- Assumed office 14 June 2024

Personal details
- Born: Poppy Raesibe Mailola
- Party: Economic Freedom Fighters
- Profession: Politician

Poppy Raisibe Mailola is a South African politician who served as the Deputy Secretary-General of the Economic Freedom Fighters (EFF) party from December 2019 until December 2024.

For the 2019 elections, she was 139th on the EFF's national list and also 18th on the party's Mpumalanga provincial list. She was elected to Parliament in the 2024 general election.
