= Delisile Ngwenya =

South African politician

Spokesperson of the Economic Freedom Fighters
- Incumbent
- Assumed office 2020 Serving with Vuyani Pambo

Member of the South African National Assembly
- In office 2019 – 30 November 2021

Permanent delegate to the National Council of Provinces
- In office 2016–2019

Personal details
- Party: Economic Freedom Fighters
- Profession: Politician

Delisile Blessing Ngwenya is a South African politician who has been one of the two national spokespeople of the Economic Freedom Fighters since 2020. She was a member of the National Assembly from 2019 to 2021. From 2016 to 2019, Ngwenya was a permanent delegate to the National Council of Provinces.

On 30 November 2021, she resigned from the National Assembly.
