= St David's Marist, Inanda =

Coordinates: 26°07′13″S 28°02′50″E

Location
- 36 Rivonia Road, Illovo; Alexandra Campus: Cnr Selborne St & 2nd St, Alexandra; Sandton, Gauteng; South Africa

Information
- School type: All-boys private school
- Motto: Confortare esto vir (Take Courage and be a Man)
- Religious affiliation: Roman Catholic
- Established: 27 January 1941; 85 years ago
- Founder: Marist Brothers
- Sister school: St Teresa's School
- School number: +27 (011) 215 7600
- Headmaster: Mr Mike Thiel
- Exam board: IEB
- Grades: 000–12
- Gender: Male
- Age: 3 to 18
- Enrollment: 640 (Prep School) +800 (College)
- Language: English
- Schedule: 08:00 – 14:00
- Campus: Urban/suburban
- Houses: Benedict; Bishops; College; Osmond; Jude; Selima; Plaatje; Daswa
- Colours: Black; Gold; Blue
- Song: Inanda's Call, Kalamazumba (traditional war cry)
- Nickname: Inanda
- Rivals: St Benedict's College, Bedfordview; St Stithians College, Randburg; St John's College; St Alban's College, Pretoria
- School fees: R105,000 (boarding); R154,400 (tuition)
- Feeder schools: St David's Marist Prep, Pridwin, St Peter's Prep School, Grayston Preparatory School, over 30 other primary schools
- Website: www.stdavids.co.za

St David's Marist Inanda is a private English medium Roman Catholic preparatory and high school for boys in Inanda, a suburb of Sandton, South Africa, overlooking the Sandton CBD to the north. St David's Marist Inanda also has a campus in Alexandra, just east of the Sandton CBD. The school was established in 1941 by the Marist Brothers.

== History ==
The school's roots began in post-revolution France. The Marist Order, also known as the Little Brothers of Mary, was founded by the Father Marcellin Champagnat to educate young children in 1817, especially the neglected or those suffering from poverty. The order has since spread throughout the world. The Maris Order arrived in Johannesburg in 1889, three years after the founding of the city. They were among the first to establish a boys' only school in the little mining town that was to become the centre of business and finance in South Africa. The location was at Koch St in downtown Johannesburg.

A second Marist Campus and school was established in Observatory in 1924 but it soon became apparent that the school premises in Koch St were becoming inadequate as the city grew and encroached on the property. As both Koch St and Observatory campuses quickly became oversubscribed additional property was sought for a new school. Land was purchased in Inanda, then a semi-rural area north of Johannesburg, and building commenced in 1940. St David's opened in 1941 as a private boarding school, initially as the Marist prep school campus for Marist Koch St and Marist Observatory. However, it became apparent that there was demand for the boys to carry on at the same campus and the first matriculation group completed their schooling at St David's in 1948. By 1953 the school had 475 pupils, 200 of them being boarders. In 1963 the school acquired another 45 acres (18 hectares) of land, making it the largest Marist establishment in South Africa.

== St David's today ==
As of 2022, the school has over 1,400 pupils. The school is separated into Junior Preparatory (Grade 000 to grade 0), Preparatory (Grades 1–7) and College, the high school (Grades 8–12). The Preparatory School has 640 boys and the College over 800 boys.

=== Uniform ===
Students wear a navy blue blazer with vertical gold stripes and a navy blue tie with diagonal gold stripes. The Marist Monogram (an intertwined "A.M." for "Ave Maria") appears on the pocket of the blazer. A "Half Colours" tie is awarded to students excelling in academics or any of the school's sports, cultural, or service activities. "Full Colours" are awarded to individuals who distinguish themselves as being one of the best in their sport or other disciplines. The 1st team colours, worn by the boys representing the school for various sports at the highest level, is black and gold. The variance from the traditional royal blue and gold was created in the early days to avoid a clash with the colours of sporting rival Marist Observatory, and so it was decided to use the colours of St David, the Catholic patron saint of Wales and of the school, which are black and gold.

=== Hierarchy and school structures ===
The Matrics (grade 12) constitute the leadership body of the school, known as the Matric Leadership Group. Between twelve and fourteen grade 11 boys are elected by the school in October to constitute the Prefect body for the following year. They take over the leadership of the school in mid-October when the Matrics commence their study leave.

The school runs on the house system. All boys are allocated to one of the eight houses listed below.

When the school was first founded the number of boys warranted only 3 houses. These original houses were:

- Benedict House : named after St Marcellin Champagnat, the founder of the Marist Brothers whose full name was Marcellin Joseph Benedict Champagnat. Many other Marist Schools have a Benedict House or have an association to the name Benedict so it is a link to many Marist schools and honours the ideals of our founder..
- College House : Said to be the original "College House" that High School boys were allocated to in the early days when numbers were small and named after The College.
- Osmond House : was named after the Marist Brother Provincial, Brother Osmond, when St David's started. He was a significant force in establishing the Inanda school, guiding it from a small kindergarten to a full school to matric.

Soon as the school grew another house was established to accommodate the growing number of boys...

- The Bishops House : This was one of the first new houses introduced as the college grew. It is believed to be named in honour of the Bishops of Johannesburg who played a pivotal role in establishing the new School in the northern part of Johannesburg.

This was the structure of the school for many years. The Prep school is still structured across thes 4 houses. However as the high school grew over the years and particularly in the last decade, it eventually became necessary to restructure the house system. A few years ago an additional 4 houses were added.

- Daswa House : named after the Blessèd Benedict Daswa who was born in 1946 in Thohoyandou. A teacher and principal, an exemplary husband and father, and a community builder in his Catholic parish, Benedict Daswa was martyred for his faith in 1990. With his beatification as Blessèd, he is likely to be South Africa's first saint and an example for all to follow.
- Jude House : The second house to be named after one of the Marist Brothers, Br Jude Pieterse was an icon in the Marist world, whose work was pivotal in creating open schools in South Africa. He not only contributed to the fabric of non-racial education, but his insight and foresight in establishing structures for the future have ensured the sustainability of our schools and therefore the Marist mission in Southern Africa.
- Plaatjie House : A true scholar, Solomon Tshekisho "Sol" Plaatje was an accomplished intellectual, teacher, court interpreter, newspaper editor, politician, linguist, translator, writer and novelist at a time when most people of colour were significantly marginalised in South Africa. A committed Christian, Plaatjie organised a fellowship group called the Christian Brotherhood at Kimberley. One of the most gifted South Africans of his time, he translated Shakespearean plays into Tswana, and his novel, Mhudi, is an enduring legacy for the world. It was only many years later that Plaatjie began to receive the recognition he deserved for the impact he had had on so many aspects of our lives in South Africa, his epitaph translated reads "Rest in Peace Morolong (the one who forges), You Servant of Africa". St David's Plaatjie boys honour him too.
- Selima House : Phineas Selima began working for the Marist Brothers at St David's as a young man in 1958, gardening & washing dishes. In 1963 he was tasked with admin responsibilities in the Bursar's office and Print Room. For over 50 years (to retirement in 2010) he never once took a sick day and remembered everyone's name. His engagements with people embodied everything it means to be Marist: simplicity, modesty, humility and love of his work. He had a quiet presence, warmth and was a man of rich faith. Every boy and staff member at St David's in those years Phineas worked there remembers him fondly.

=== Sporting tradition ===
Students participate in summer and winter sports, teams are arranged according to age groups (Under 14, 15, 16 and Open) to compete against other schools. The primary sports in the high school are rugby union, cricket, soccer, swimming, waterpolo and hockey. In winter, the school fields about 15 rugby teams and 13 hockey teams every week. The school also has tennis, canoeing, cross country and basketball. Participating in and supporting sport is compulsory at St David's.

The sports that are offered in the school are:

- Athletics
- Basketball
- Canoeing
- Cricket
- Cross country
- Football (soccer)
- Golf
- Hockey
- Orienteering
- Rugby
- Rock climbing
- Swimming
- Tennis
- Water polo

== Cultural tradition ==
The school has choirs, bands and private instrument tuition. Annual events include inter-House music and play competitions, as well as yearly major dramatic productions. Like sport, participating in cultural activities is compulsory.

== Service and Leadership ==
St David's sponsors and participates in various community service and social development initiatives, several of which are organized in partnership with the Marist Brothers, the Catholic Church, or non-governmental organizations (NGOs). These programs align with the school's Marist educational framework, which emphasizes principles such as simplicity, presence, love of work, family spirit, and devotion to Mary.

== Notable alumni ==
- Temba Bavuma – South African cricketer for the Highveld Lions, captain for the Proteas.
- Giulio Giuricich – South African former soccer player, plays For Moroka Swallows.
- Dominic Hendricks – South African cricketer, plays for the Highveld Lions.
- Pumelela Matshikwe – South African former cricketer, plays for the Highveld Lions.
- Vuyani Pambo - South African Politician,Member of Parliament for the Economic Freedom Fighters

== See also ==
- List of boarding schools
