= Sindiso Magaqa =

South African politician (died 2017)

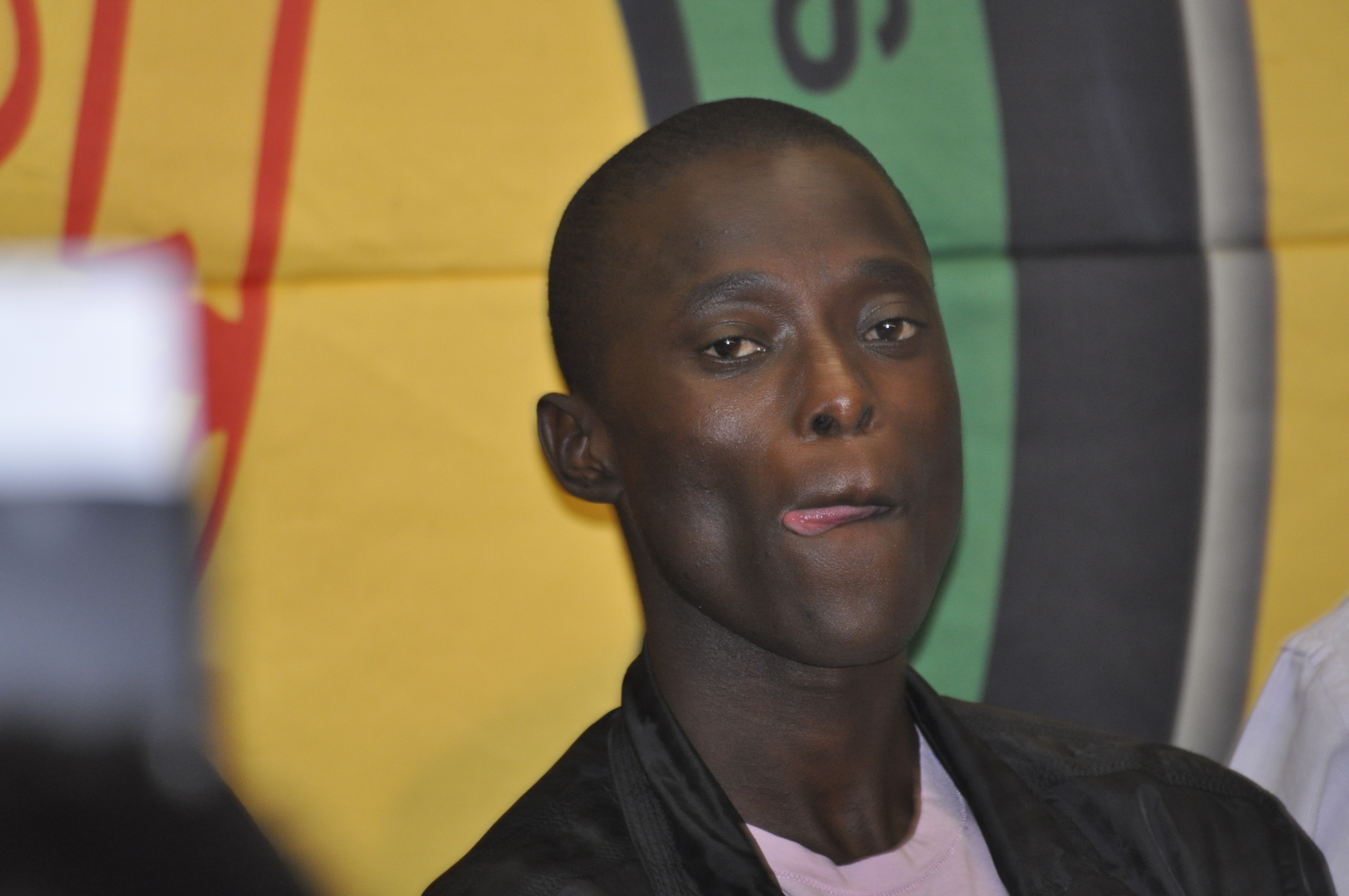
- Magaqa in September 2011

Secretary General of the African National Congress Youth League
- In office June 2011 – April 2012
- President: Julius Malema
- Deputy: Kenetswe Mosenogi
- Preceded by: Vuyiswa Tulelo
- Succeeded by: Njabulo Nzuza

Personal details
- Born: 1981/1982 Umzimkhulu, South Africa
- Died: 4 September 2017 (aged 35) Durban, South Africa
- Party: African National Congress
- Education: University of South Africa

Sindiso Magaqa (born 1981/1982 – 4 September 2017) was a South African politician from KwaZulu-Natal. A member of the African National Congress (ANC), he was assassinated while serving as a local councillor in Umzimkhulu Local Municipality. He was formerly the secretary general of the ANC Youth League from June 2011 to April 2012, when he was found guilty of misconduct and suspended from the party for a year.

== Early life and career ==
Magaqa was born in the township of Ibisi in Umzimkhulu, which was a part of the Eastern Cape until it joined KwaZulu-Natal in 2006. He joined the Congress of South African Students while still in primary school, and he went on to become an active member of the African National Congress, joining the ANC Youth League (ANCYL) in 1997. In tandem with his political career, he studied law at the University of South Africa and for a time was employed as a project manager in the Umzimkhulu Local Municipality.

== ANC Youth League ==
=== Political rise ===
He would stand for nomination at every elective conference, from branch level... the only thing that prevented him from standing for elections at Women's League conferences was because he is a man.

— Thabiso Zulu on Magaqa's political ambition, 2011

Magaqa rose to political prominence in the ANCYL, first in the league's regional executive committee in Alfred Nzo (in the Eastern Cape) and then as the regional chairperson, for four terms, of the league's Harry Gwala branch (in KwaZulu-Natal). In May 2010, he was elected as the deputy provincial chairperson of the ANCYL's KwaZulu-Natal branch. He and the newly elected provincial chairperson, Mthandeni Dlungwana, were both elected as part of a slate of candidates aligned to the provincial secretary, Bheki Mtolo.

After only a year in the provincial branch, Magaqa emerged as the frontrunner to succeed Vuyiswa Tulelo as national secretary general of the ANCYL. As the leadership elections approached, he had the support of eight of the league's nine provincial branches; his opponent, Ayanda Matiti, was the chairperson of the Eastern Cape branch and attracted its support. The ANCYL's 24th national conference was held in June 2011 at Gallagher Estate in Midrand and Magaqa was elected as secretary general, with Kenetswe Mosenogi as his deputy.

=== ANC suspension ===
Magaqa entered the ANCYL secretariat at the outset of the second term of league president Julius Malema, who had already clashed several times with the leadership of the mainstream ANC. The Mail & Guardian regarded Magaqa as a close ally of Malema, and he adopted a similarly provocative stance. In particular, in August 2011, he published an ANCYL statement that was highly critical of Malusi Gigaba, the incumbent Minister of Public Enterprises. The statement accused Gigaba of "pleasing imperialists" by publicly criticising the ANCYL's policy on the nationalisation of mines.

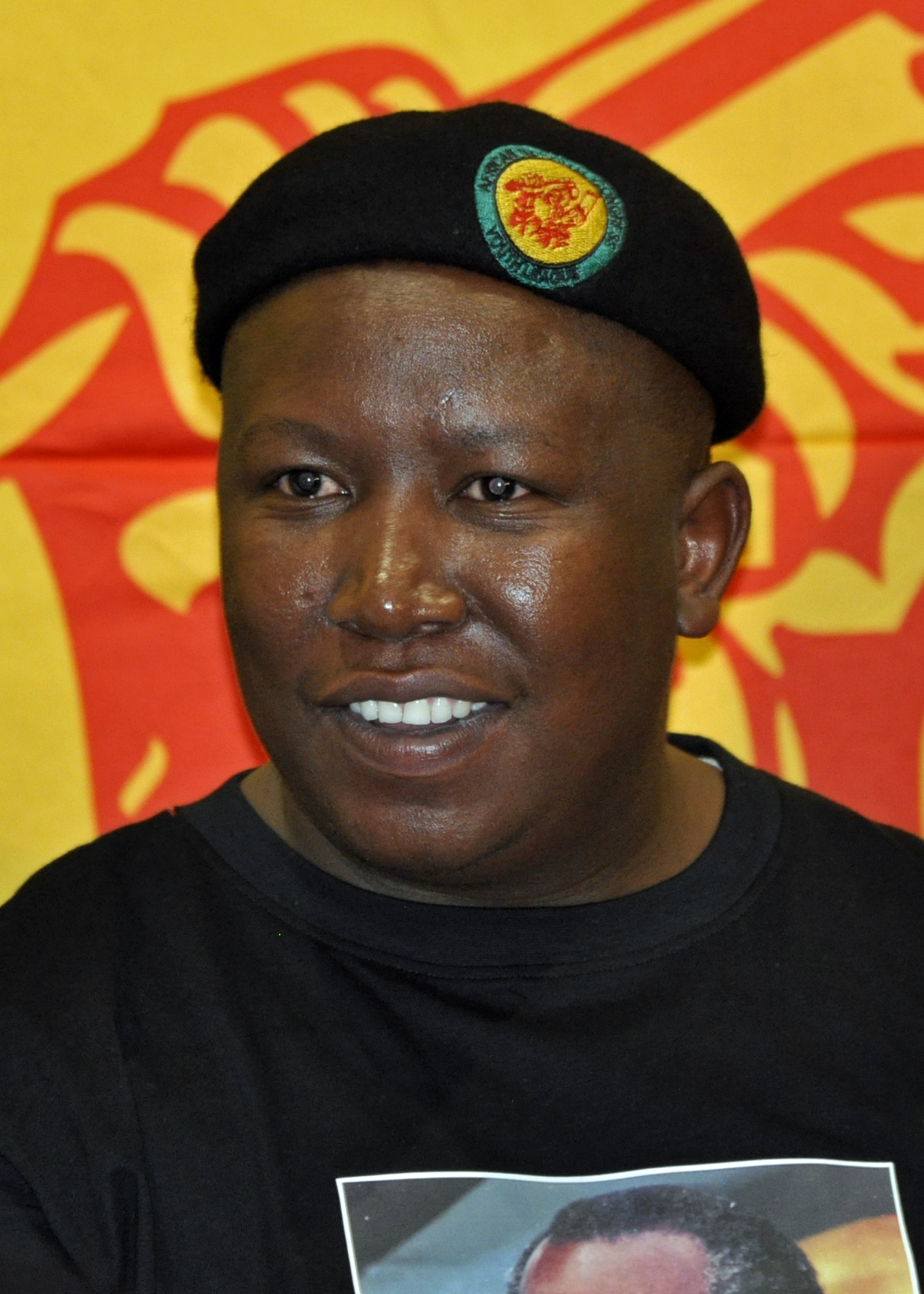
Magaqa was a close political ally of Julius Malema.

Later in August 2011, after Malema issued a particularly provocative statement of his own, the ANC's National Executive Committee took disciplinary action against the entire top leadership of the ANCYL. Magaqa appeared with the others at a disciplinary tribunal at Luthuli House on 30 August. On 10 November, the ANC's National Disciplinary Committee, chaired by Derek Hanekom, found Magaqa found guilty of misconduct for his public attacks on Minister Gigaba. As sanction, his ANC membership was suspended and he was ordered to apologise publicly to Gigaba.

Through a complicated internal appeals process, this sentence was reconsidered once by the National Disciplinary Committee (which increased it to a three-year suspension), and twice by Cyril Ramaphosa's National Disciplinary Committee of Appeals. At the conclusion of the process in April 2012, Ramaphosa's committee ultimately handed Magaqa a one-year suspension from the ANC.

=== Aftermath ===
While Magaqa was serving his suspension, the leadership corps of the ANCYL was disbanded, and a new leadership was not elected until September 2015, when Njabulo Nzuza was elected to succeed Magaqa as ANCYL secretary general. Malema was expelled from the ANC at the same time that Magaqa was suspended, and Magaqa continued to defend Malema publicly. Indeed, Malema later claimed that Magaqa had considered joining his breakaway political party, the Economic Freedom Fighters.

Nonetheless, when Magaqa's suspension ended in April 2013, he said that he would remain a "fighter for economic freedom" under the ANC banner. In the August 2016 local elections, he was elected to represent the ANC as a local councillor in Umzimkhulu Local Municipality, his hometown.

== Assassination ==
=== Shooting and death ===
In the evening of 13 July 2017, Magaqa and two other local politicians – Nonsikelelo Mafa and Jabu Mzizi – were shot and wounded in an apparent assassination attempt. The trio were on a car trip together and were ambushed when they stopped at a general store near Magaqa's home in Idisi. The South African Police Service said that about 15 shots were fired into the car by at least two gunmen, who wielded an R1 rifle and a pistol. All three of the victims were hospitalised and stabilised, though Magaqa, who had been driving the car, was critically injured.

Magaqa died at the Inkosi Albert Luthuli Hospital in Durban on 4 September 2017, aged 35. Although family members suspected that he had been poisoned, arguing that he had made a full recovery in the weeks before his death, his official cause of death was the gunshot wounds he had sustained in the July shooting. His funeral was held on 16 September in Umzimkhulu.

The apparent assassination of Magaqa was part of a broader wave of political violence in the region in 2016 and 2017, which had begun ahead of the 2016 local elections and which intensified in the run-up to the ANC's 54th National Conference. Some observers linked the shooting to factionalism in the ANC. More specifically, Magaqa's relatives and friends – particularly his ANC comrade Thabiso Zulu – told the press that Magaqa was targeted because he had blown the whistle on corruption in Umzimkhulu Municipality. Similar evidence was heard by the Moerane Commission, an inquiry established to investigate political killings in KwaZulu-Natal. Blueprint for Free Speech gave Zulu a whistleblowers' award for testifying about Magaqa's murder at the Moerane Commission despite threats to his own security.

=== Arrests and murder trial ===
In 2018, the police made its first arrests in connection with the shooting, and in March 2019, four men were charged with common-purpose murder in the Umzimkhulu magistrate's court. They were former policeman Sbonelo Myeza, businessman Mbulelo Mpofana, Umzimkhulu municipal manager Zweliphansi Skhosana, and, most prominently, politician Mluleki Ndobe, who at the time was the mayor of Harry Gwala District Municipality. However, the charges against Skhosana and Ndobe were dropped soon afterwards, and two new defendants – Mlungisi Ncalane and Sibusiso Ncengwa—were charged. Their trial began in the Pietermaritzburg High Court in April 2023, and they pled not guilty. Charging them with conspiracy to commit murder, murder, and attempted murder, the state alleged that the motive for the shooting stemmed from the mismanagement of funds in Umzimkhulu Municipality. The trial resumed in early 2024 after a prolonged postponement.

The former municipal manager of Umzimkhulu Municipality was arrested in June 2025 in connection with the murder of Sindiso Magaqa. On 6 October 2025, Zweliphansi Stanley Skhosana appeared in the Pietermaritzburg High Court accused of masterminding the 2017 assassination of Magaqa.

On 5 May 2026, Fadiel Adams was arrested by the Political Killings Task Team (PKTT) on charges of fraud and defeating or obstructing the course of justice. Police stated that "the task team discovered that Mr Adams interfered with the now convicted and sentenced hitman at a very sensitive and advanced stage of the police’s investigation." This interference was in connection with the murder case of Magaqa.

== Honours ==
A student residence at the Nelson Mandela University in George is named after Magaqa.

== See also ==
- Political assassinations in post-apartheid South Africa
