= Godrich Gardee =

South African politician

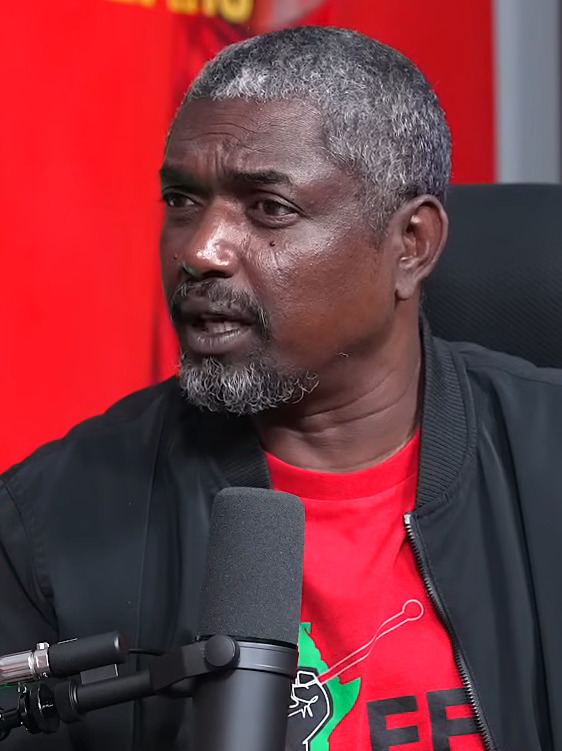
- Gardee in 2024

Deputy President of the Economic Freedom Fighters
- Incumbent
- Assumed office 14 December 2024
- President: Julius Malema
- Preceded by: Floyd Shivambu

Secretary-General of the Economic Freedom Fighters
- In office 15 December 2014 – 14 December 2019
- President: Julius Malema
- Preceded by: Position established
- Succeeded by: Marshall Dlamini

Member of the National Assembly of South Africa
- In office 22 May 2019 – 29 February 2020

Personal details
- Party: Economic Freedom Fighters
- Profession: Politician

Godrich Gardee is a South African politician and Deputy President of the Economic Freedom Fighters (EFF). He became involved in politics in 1985 and has a Higher National Diploma in Accounting and National Park Auditing.

Gardee was succeeded as Secretary-General by Marshall Dlamini in December 2019. He resigned as an MP on 28 February 2020.

Gardee was elected Deputy President in December 2024.

In May 2022, Gardee's daughter, Hillary Gardee, a 28-year-old IT graduate, was abducted and murdered in Mbombela. Passers-by found her lifeless body several days later at the edge of a forest on a deserted stretch of the Sabie road.
