= Jonah Fisher =

English broadcast journalist (born 1977)

Jonah Fisher is a correspondent for BBC News and its first resident correspondent for Myanmar. Jonah Fisher is an experienced BBC correspondent and during an eventful 10 years working for the BBC has been based in Ukraine, Eritrea, Sudan, London, South Africa, Nigeria and most recently, Thailand. He has worked on many features for the BBC including: interviewing Buddhist monk Wirathu and members of Burma's Muslim community who have been caught up in clashes with Buddhist nationalists in 2013, accompanying Greenpeace tracking whales hunted by the Japanese whaling fleet; and violence against journalists by Sudanese security forces outside Khartoum, Sudan where he was attacked. From 2012 to 2014, Fisher was the BBC's correspondent in Bangkok where he covered anti-government protesters in Bangkok as demonstrators try to unseat the Thai Prime Minister Yingluck Shinawatra.

== Myanmar Resident Correspondent ==
Jonah Fisher is the first resident correspondent for the BBC in Myanmar. Peter Horrocks, Director of BBC Global News, said: “The appointment of Jonah Fisher marks another important milestone in the rapid welcome changes taking place in Burma/Myanmar. Censorship and repression are being replaced with a new media environment where the BBC can freely broadcast trusted and impartial news. The BBC's charity BBC Media Action will continue its work to help train the next generation of Burma/Myanmar journalists which will further contribute to the country’s transition towards media freedom. These investments are part of our commitment to our audiences in Burma/Myanmar and we look forward to covering the historic elections in 2015.” In February 2017, he attracted attention for his alleged arrogance and rude behavior when questioning a group of monks in Yangon, Myanmar.

== ANC outburst ==
Following a comment by Fisher to Julius Malema ("You live in Sandton."), Malema spoke:

Malema: Let me tell you before you are tjatjarag (South African slang: excitable, or, to speak a lot) – this is a building of a revolutionary party and you know nothing about the revolution. So here you behave or else you jump (audience laughs). Don’t laugh. Chief, can you get security to remove this THING here. If you are not going to behave, we are going to get security to take you out. This is not a news room this, this is a revolutionary house and you don’t come here with that white tendency, not here. You can do it somewhere else, not here. If you have got a tendency of undermining blacks even where you work, you are in the wrong place. Here you are in the wrong place.

Fisher: ...that’s rubbish...

Malema: You can go out…rubbish is what you have covered in that trouser – that is rubbish. That which you have covered in [your] clothes is rubbish, ok? You are a small boy you can’t do anything. Go out…bastard! Go out! You bloody agent!
