= Economic Freedom Fighters of Swaziland =

Political movement in Eswatini

- Abbreviation: EFF SWA
- President: Nombulelo Motsa
- Chairperson: Zanele Shongwe
- Secretary-General: Mncedisi Mngometulu
- Spokesperson: Kevin Dlamini
- Deputy President: Mthokozisi Makhunga
- Deputy Secretary General: Ntombikayise Shongwe
- Treasurer General: Zakhele Khumalo
- Founded: 2020
- Student wing: Swaziland Student Command
- Women's wing: Women’s Command
- Ideology: Communism; Anti-capitalism; Anti-imperialism
- Political position: Far-left
- South African counterpart: Economic Freedom Fighters
- Colors: Red, green, black
- Slogan: "#asijiki"

Party flag

Website
- www.effswaziland.com

The Economic Freedom Fighters of Swaziland (EFF SWA) is a political movement in Eswatini founded in 2020. The EFF SWA took an active role in the 2021 protests in the country and was observed to have played a key role in connecting activists. During the protests the EFF SWA reported that their president had been kidnapped by police.
