= Inanda, Gauteng =

Inanda
- Location within Gauteng Location within South Africa
- Coordinates: 26.121°S 28.057°E
- Country: South Africa
- Province: Gauteng
- Municipality: City of Johannesburg
- Main Place: Sandton

Area
  - Total: 0.55 km^{2} (0.21 sq mi)

Population (2011)
  - Total: 842
  - Density: 1,500/km^{2} (4,000/sq mi)

Racial makeup (2011)
  - Black African: 39.6%
  - Coloured: 0.6%
  - Indian/Asian: 2.8%
  - White: 56.0%
  - Other: 0.9%

First languages (2011)
  - English: 57.7%
  - Zulu: 10.4%
  - Afrikaans: 7.3%
  - Northern Sotho: 5.4%
  - Other: 19.2%
- Time zone: UTC+2 (SAST)

Inanda is a suburb of Sandton, South Africa. It is situated in Region E, on Rivonia Road about 1.5 km from Sandton City. The suburb contains the Inanda Club, an elite equestrian and Polo establishment and St David's Marist Inanda, a primary and high school with a combined intake of over 1100 pupils.
