= Floyd Shivambu =

South African politician (born 1983)

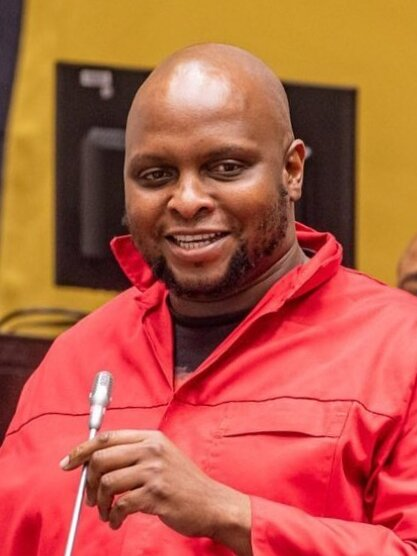
- Shivambu in 2024

President of the Afrika Mayibuye Movement
- Incumbent
- Assumed office 5 September 2025
- Preceded by: Party established

Deputy President of the Economic Freedom Fighters
- In office 26 July 2013 – 15 August 2024
- President: Julius Malema
- Preceded by: office established
- Succeeded by: Godrich Gardee

Secretary General of uMkhonto weSizwe
- In office 10 November 2024 – 3 June 2025

Member of the National Assembly of South Africa
- In office 21 May 2014 – 15 August 2024

Personal details
- Born: Nyiko Floyd Shivambu; 1 January 1983 (age 43) Malamulele, Transvaal Province, South Africa (now Limpopo Province)
- Party: uMkhonto weSizwe (2024–2025); Economic Freedom Fighters (2013–2024); African National Congress (1990–2012)
- Spouse: Siphesihle Pezi-Shivambu (m. 2017)
- Children: Katekani Shivambu
- Relatives: Brian Shivambu (brother)
- Education: University of Witwatersrand

Nyiko Floyd Shivambu (born 1 January 1983) is a South African politician. He is the founder and leader of the Afrika Mayibuye Movement (AMM). He previously served as a member of National Assembly for the Economic Freedom Fighters (EFF) until 15 August 2024, when he joined Jacob Zuma's uMkhonto weSizwe Party (MKP) serving as the MKP secretary-general from November 2024 until his dismissal in June 2025. Following the decision to remove him, Shivambu announced the Mayibuye Consultation, a splinter group.

Shivambu was the Deputy President and lieutenant commander-in-chief of the Economic Freedom Fighters, its Parliamentary Chief Whip in the South African Parliament, and served in the Trade and Industry Portfolio Committee and the Standing Committee on Finance. Shivambu was also a Member of the Pan African Parliament, serving in the Rural Economy, Agriculture, Natural Resources and Environment Committee.

== Early life and education ==
Nyiko Floyd Shivambu was born in the rural village of Mahonisi, Malamulele town in the Limpopo province. He was one of seven children and grew up in a house without running water or electricity. His parents earned a living as informal traders selling hand-made duvets and pillowcases in nearby towns. Shivambu graduated from the Mphambo High School in Malamulele in 2001.

Shivambu went on to study at the University of the Witwatersrand in Johannesburg with the intention of becoming a technician. He changed academic focus and instead earned a bachelor's degree as well as an honours degree in Political Studies and International Relations. Shivambu graduated with a master's degree, with distinction, in political studies in 2014. In his third year at the University of the Witwatersrand, Shivambu was elected president of the university's Student Representative Body and joined the African National Congress Youth League.

On 6 February 2018, he announced that he has been accepted by the Wits School of Governance to pursue a doctoral degree with his thesis focused on SA's transformation policies, legislation and practices: ownership and control of JSE-listed companies.

== Political career ==
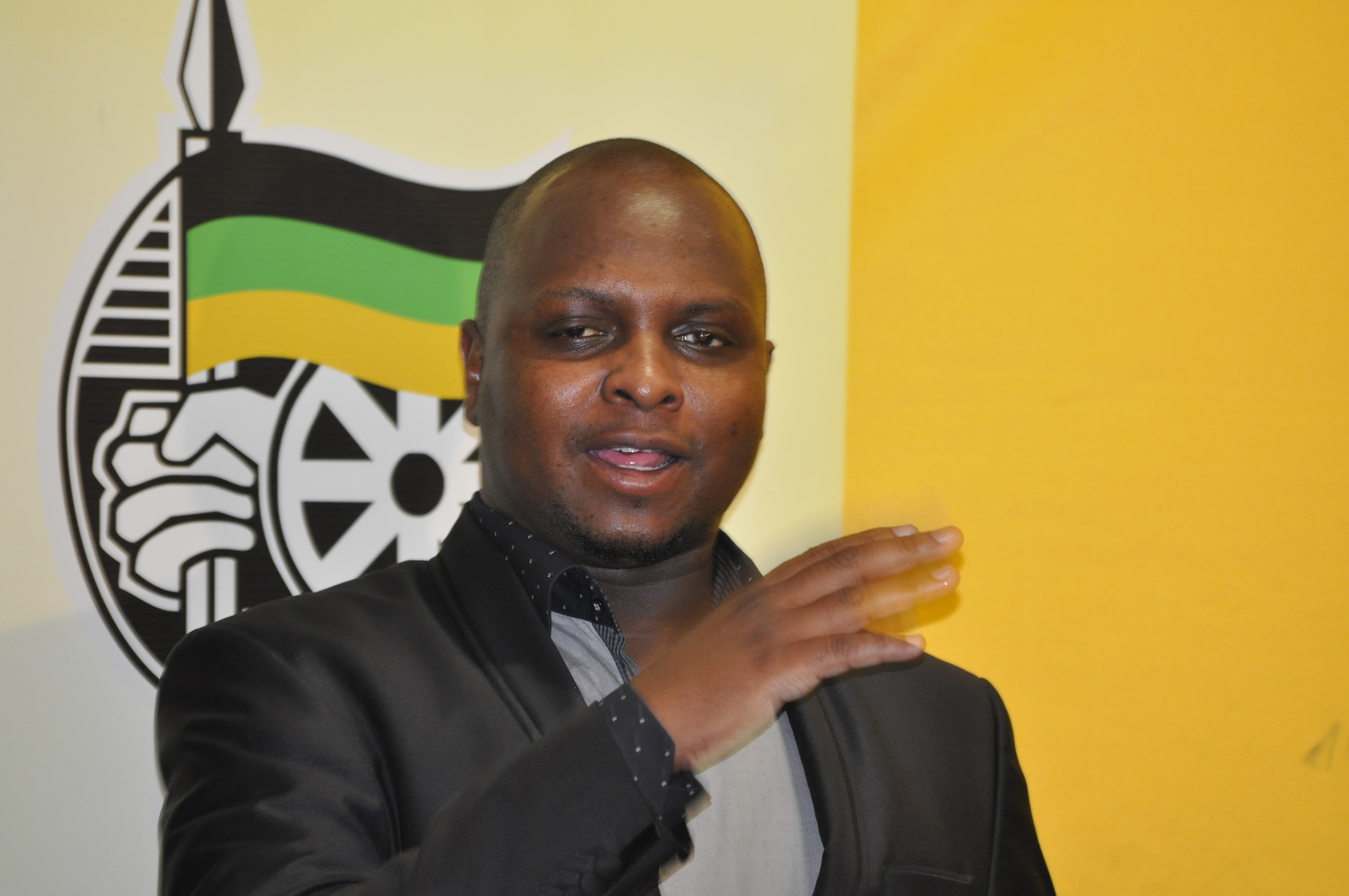
Shivambu in 2011

Floyd Shivambu's political career began in student leadership when he served as the Student Representative Council president at the University of the Witwatersrand from 2004 to 2005. He then became a Students Representative for the Joint Initiative for Priority Skills Acquisition from 2006 to 2007 and was also a National Executive member of the South African Students Congress. From 2008 to 2012, he held dual roles as a Board Member of the National Student Financial Aid Scheme and Spokesperson of the African National Congress Youth League (ANCYL). During his time in the ANCYL, he developed a close political alliance with Julius Malema.

Following their suspension from the ANC, Shivambu co-founded the Economic Freedom Fighters (EFF) in 2013 alongside Malema and served as the party’s Deputy President until 2024, overseeing Policy, Research, and International Relations. In 2014, he was elected as a Member of Parliament for the EFF, a position he held until 2024, while also serving as a Member of the Pan-African Parliament from 2014 to 2018. That same year, he co-edited The Coming Revolution: Julius Malema and the Fight for Economic Freedom.

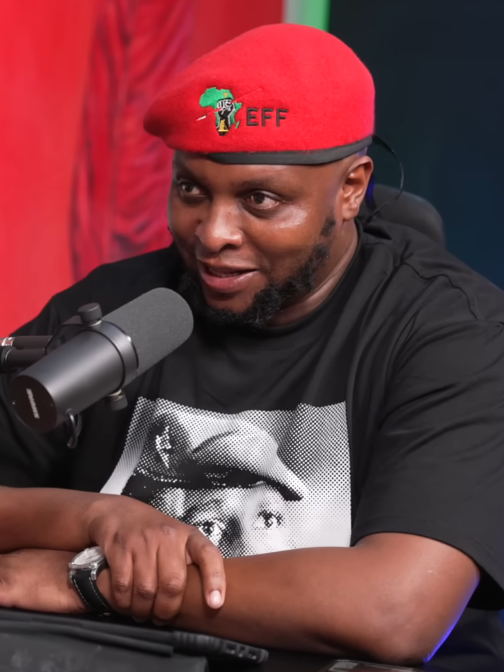
Shivambu in April 2024 as a member of the Economic Freedom Fighters

In the 2024 South African general election, Malema stated that a potential EFF-ANC coalition would depend on Shivambu being appointed Minister of Finance. On 18 August 2024 Julius Malema announced Sinawo Tambo as Floyd's replacement in parliament. However, following the election, he instead joined the uMkhonto weSizwe Party, becoming its Secretary General and a Member of Parliament. On 18 August 2024, Malema announced that Sinawo Tambo would replace Shivambu in Parliament.

Shivambu was dismissed as MK's Secretary General in June 2025. Three months later, Shivambu registered his political party, Mayibuye Afrika, ahead of the local elections. In an SABC interview, Shivambu called his former party, the EFF, "directionless" and not focused on the people. He further said the EFF had embraced corrupt governance practices, abandoned its founding values, and was unfit to replace the ANC. Shivambu also said the EFF had a toxic culture of self-enrichment and was not focused on mandates such as service delivery and job creation.

== Controversies ==
In 2011, Shivambu was ousted from his position as ANC Youth League spokesman by an ANC disciplinary hearing, after he swore at a journalist, and after making comments about helping to bring about regime change in Botswana.

On 17 August 2018, Shivambu was arrested for speeding. He was caught driving at 182 km/h in 120 km/h zone, and subsequently released on bail.

=== Assault of journalist ===
On 20 March 2018, Shivambu was filmed attacking a journalist outside Parliament and was scheduled to stand trial for assault in February 2021. This hearing was subsequently postponed until September 2021.

=== Paternity scandal ===
In 2015, Shivambu was involved in a heavily publicised paternity scandal. After initially denying that he had fathered a child with his former girlfriend, Andile Masuku, he later acknowledged the child was his son following a paternity test. In November 2015, he claimed he could not afford the R5000 monthly maintenance.

=== Racism accusations ===
Shivambu was criticised for demanding to know why treasury official Ismail Momoniat, who is of South African Indian ancestry, was presenting so often to parliament instead of a black National Treasury official, stating that Momoniat's presence "undermines African leadership". This led to widespread condemnation of Shivambu by other politicians and on social media for both questing Momoniat's role in the anti-apartheid movement and for being racially prejudiced.

Four months later, the Daily Maverick stated that a likely reason for Shivambu's statements about Momoniat was because he was part of a group of treasury officials investigating the collapse of VBS Mutual Bank which allegedly involved Shivambu and his brother Brian Shivambu.

=== VBS Bank ===
A report published by the South African Reserve Bank in October 2018 indicated that Shivambu's brother, Brian Shivambu, was the recipient of R16,148,569 (US$1.09 million) in irregular payments from the now collapsed bank VBS Mutual Bank. Further investigative reporting by Pauli Van Wyk with considerable substantiating evidence alleged that R1.3 million of this money was then paid to the EFF and R10 million given to Floyd Shivambu himself. Shivambu has since asked that anyone who has evidence he had dealings with VBS must come forward.

During this period the Mail & Guardian newspaper published an article based on WhatsApp texts leaked by a whistleblower alleging that Shivambu's brother's company was a conduit for Shivambu to receive illicit payments.

Ongoing forensic financial investigations indicate that at least R1.84-million illicitly flowed from VBS Mutual Bank, via two front companies, into Shivambu’s personal bank account. The South African Parliament’s joint ethics committee found that Shivambu had received at least R180,000, in three payments, of VBS money from his brother's (Brian) company Sgameka Projects Pty Ltd in 2017.

=== Shepherd Bushiri ===
In April 2025, Shivambu, while in Malawi, visited a church run by Shepherd Bushiri. Bushiri is wanted for fraud and corruption in South Africa, and skipped bail in 2020. In June 2025, MK president Jacob Zuma sacked Shivambu from his role as Secretary General, stating that the visit was unsanctioned and in violation of the party's constitution.
