= Economic Freedom Fighters =

Far-left political party in South Africa

- Abbreviation: EFF
- President: Julius Malema
- Chairperson: Nontando Nolutshungu
- Secretary-General: Marshall Dlamini
- Spokesperson: Sinawo Tambo
- Deputy President: Godrich Gardee
- Deputy Secretary-General: Leigh-Ann Mathys
- Treasurer-General: Omphile Maotwe
- Founders: Julius Malema; Floyd Shivambu
- Founded: 26 July 2013
- Split from: African National Congress
- Headquarters: 119 Marshall Street, Johannesburg, Gauteng
- Membership (2022): ▲1,085,843
- Ideology: Communism; Marxism–Leninism; Sankarism; Anti-capitalism; Black nationalism; Pan-Africanism; Left-wing populism
- Political position: Far-left
- National affiliation: Progressive Caucus
- Affiliated parties: Namibian Economic Freedom Fighters; Economic Freedom Fighters of Swaziland; Economic Freedom Party (Kenya)
- Colours: Red
- Slogan: Our land and jobs, now!
- National Assembly: 39 / 400
- National Council of Provinces: 11 / 90
- Pan-African Parliament: 1 / 5 (South African seats)
- Provincial Legislatures: 50 / 487
- City of Johannesburg Metropolitan Municipality (council): 30 / 270
- Nelson Mandela Bay Metropolitan Municipality (council): 6 / 120
- City of Cape Town (council): 10 / 231

Website
- effonline.org

The Economic Freedom Fighters (EFF) is a Marxist–Leninist and black nationalist political party in South Africa. It was founded by far-left activist Julius Malema and his allies on 26 July 2013. Malema is president of the EFF, heading the Central Command Team, which serves as the central structure of the party. It is the fourth-largest party in the National Assembly.

The party contested elections for the first time in the 2014 South African general election, garnering 6.35% of the national vote and securing 25 seats in the National Assembly.

The party's primarily political position is that South Africa still has an economic system that benefits white people over black people and that significant reform based upon Marxist principles must be instituted. The party has been a notable advocate for pan-Africanism.

Since its founding the EFF has been embroiled in several controversies in which it has been said to have used divisive, violent, and racist rhetoric. According to a judge in the South African Equality court, Malema has "called for racists to be killed". Malema has been convicted on a gun charge regarding the firing of a rifle into the air at a political rally in 2018. On 18 April 2026, he was sentenced to 5 years of prison pending appeal.

== History ==
=== Foundation and early history ===
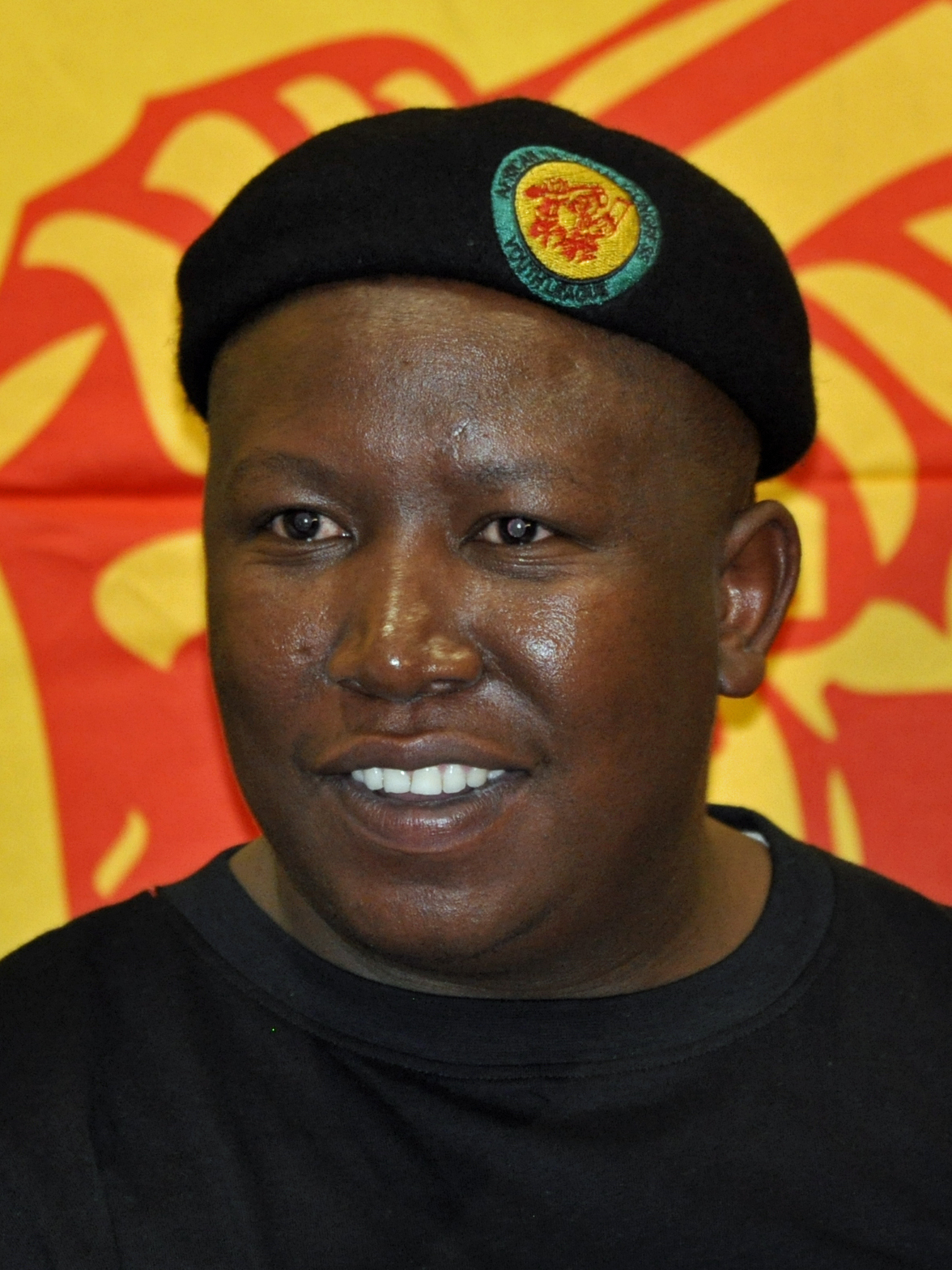
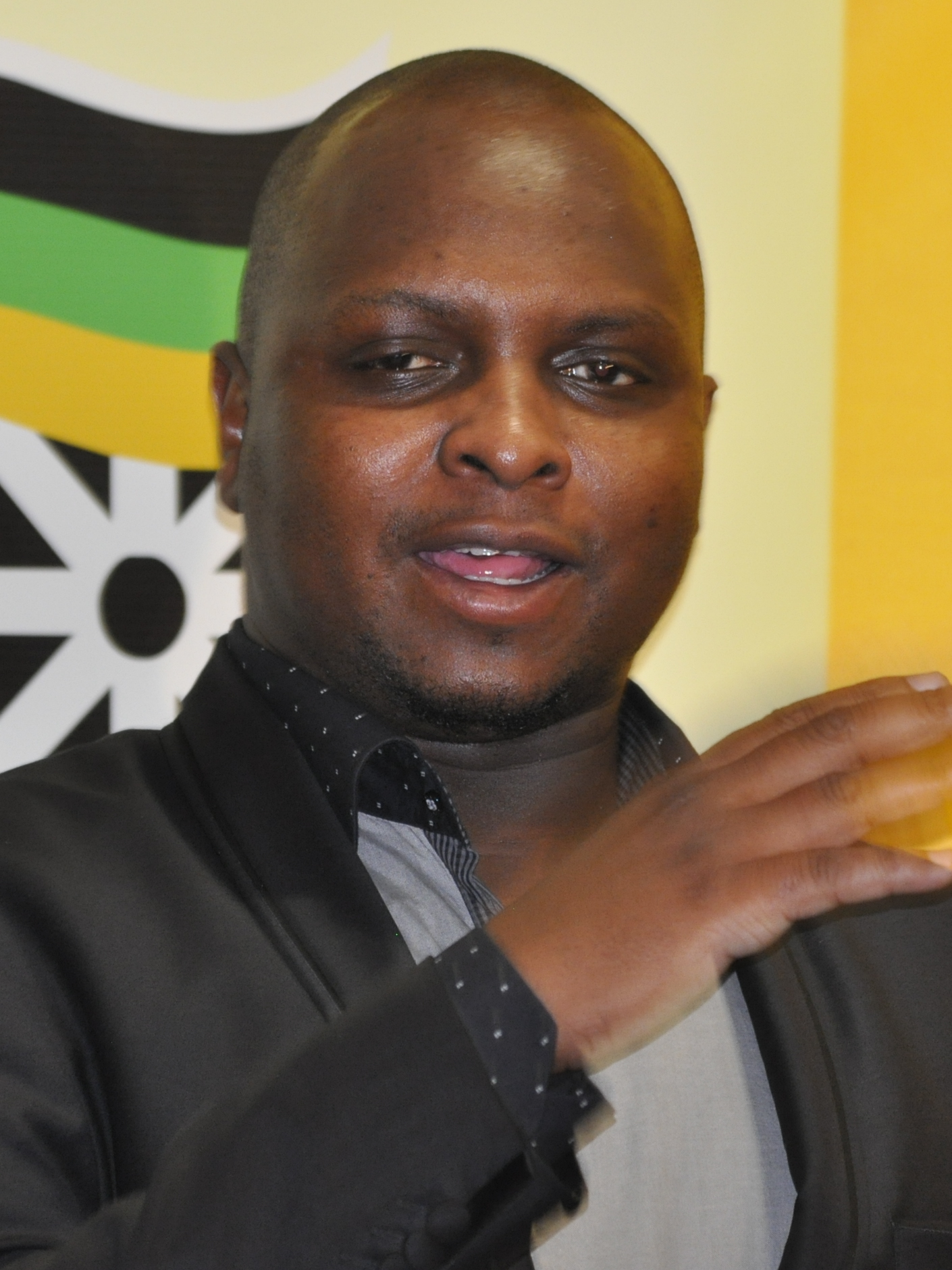
Party founders Julius Malema and Floyd Shivambu. Both had been leaders in the African National Congress Youth League.

At a 26 July 2013 press briefing in Soweto, expelled former African National Congress Youth League (ANCYL) president Julius Malema announced that the new party had over 1000 members, double the 500 required for registration with the Independent Electoral Commission (IEC). The EFF is now registered with the IEC, after an objection to its registration by the Freedom Front Plus (FF+) was dismissed in September 2013.

In 2015, the EFF suspended MP Lucky Twala and expelled three MPs, Mpho Ramakatsa, Andile Mngxitama, and Khanyisile Litchfield-Tshabalala. Mngxitama formed his own party, Black First Land First (BLF), while Litchfield-Tshabalala joined the United Democratic Movement. Malema has been accused by former members of purging his critics to consolidate his power. He acknowledged this criticism in a press conference and said the party should have expelled more ill-disciplined members.

=== Recent actions and activities ===
On 6 August 2015, the EFF announced it had secured a Constitutional Court case for its "#PayBackTheMoney" campaign against Jacob Zuma. The case was heard on 9 February 2016. Chief Justice Mogoeng Mogoeng found that Zuma had violated the Constitution of South Africa, along with the Speaker of the National Assembly Baleka Mbete. Zuma was given 60 days to fulfill the requirements of the Public Protector Thuli Madonsela.

On 27 February 2018, the EFF tabled a motion in the National Assembly to amend the Constitution so as to allow for the expropriation of land without compensation. The motion, brought by Malema, was adopted with a vote of 241 in support and 83 against. The only parties to oppose it were the Democratic Alliance, Freedom Front Plus, Congress of the People and the ACDP. Land expropriation is one of the EFF's seven cardinal pillars.

In 2018, the party's student wing, the EFF Student Command, came in first at several Student Representative Council elections, defeating the African National Congress (ANC)-aligned South African Students Congress (SASCO) at the Durban University of Technology, the University of Zululand and Mangosuthu University of Technology. It also won in Cape Town, the District Six, Mowbray and Bellville Cape Peninsula University of Technology (CPUT) campuses with landslide victories. It also won the University of Cape Town. Peter Keetse, president of the EFFSC, said the win was a warning for what would happen in the 2019 national general elections. He said the youth were the influencers of the future: "this is an indication of what is to follow".

In March 2023, the party attempted to organise a national shutdown in protest of loadshedding and called for South African President Cyril Ramaphosa to step down. The shutdown was widely reported as ineffective and involved a number of instances of fake news spread by party supporters.

In June 2024, the EFF refused to join the ANC-led Government of National Unity (GNU), because of the Democratic Alliance (DA) and Freedom Front Plus (FF+) participation in the coalition.

In August 2024, EFF deputy president Floyd Shivambu left the party and joined former president Jacob Zuma's uMkhonto weSizwe (MK) party.

== Ideology and policies ==
=== Marxist ideology ===
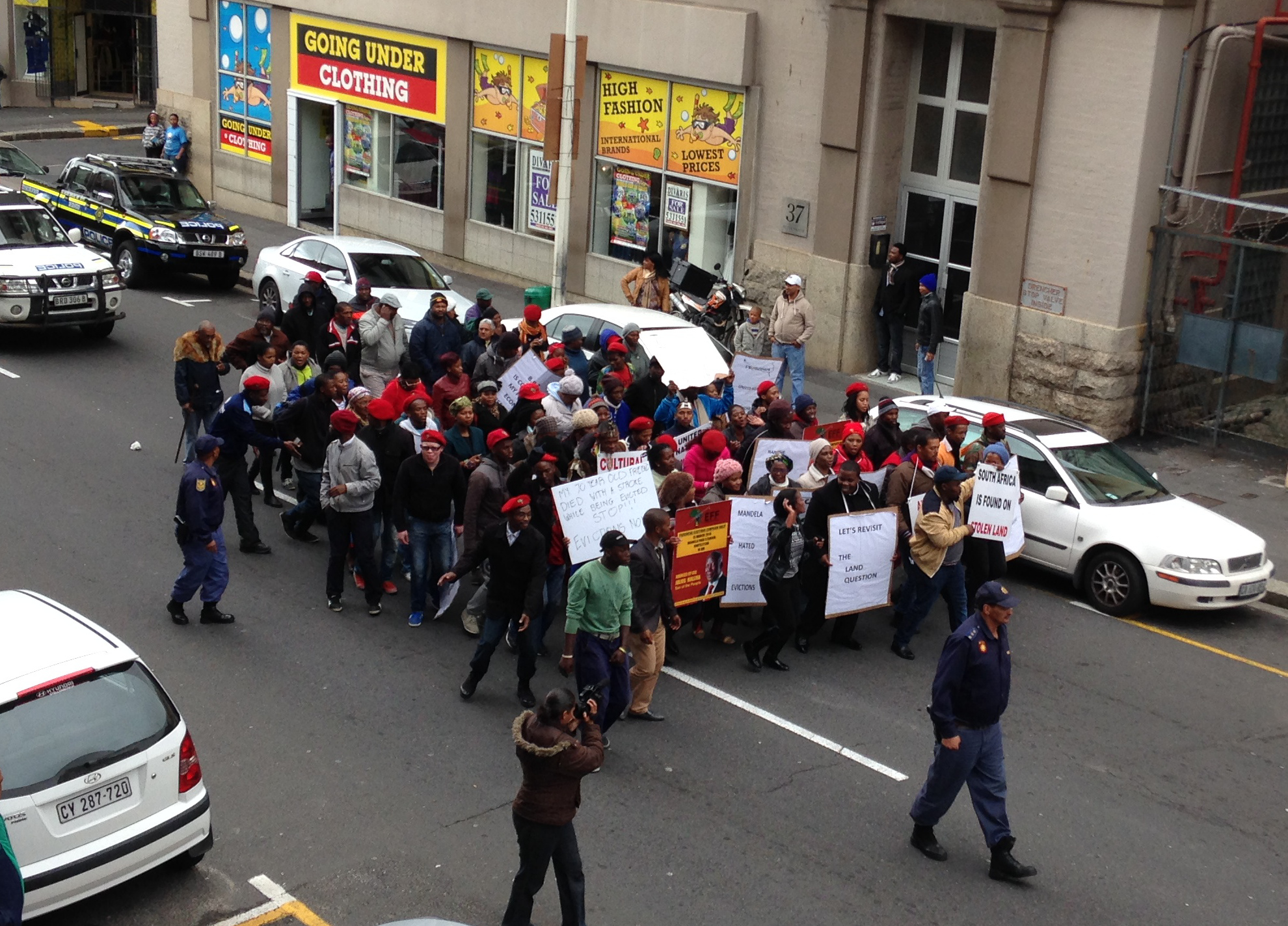
A march by the EFF protesting in support of land reform in South Africa

According to its constitution, the EFF "subscribes to the Marxist-Leninist and Fanonian schools of thought on its analysis of the State, imperialism, class and race contradictions in every society." The EFF says it takes inspiration from Burkinabé President Thomas Sankara in both style and ideology. Prominent EFF member Jackie Shandu declared the party a "proudly Sankarist formation". The EFF takes ideological inspiration from the works of Leon Trotsky, advocating for "democratic control of the state by the workers," although it rejects the classification of Trotskyism to avoid association with Trotskyists.

The party's Seven Cardinal Pillars were first articulated in its Founding Manifesto (2013) and remain central to the party's political agenda and included in its constitution. They are:

1. Expropriation of Land Without Compensation: The EFF advocates for land expropriation without compensation, arguing that land was stolen during colonial and Apartheid eras. The party proposes that all land should be under state custodianship and that land should be redistributed equitably. It says the South African government's willing-buyer-willing-seller principle should be abolished. This position has significantly influenced South Africa's land reform debate since Malema's time in the African National Congress Youth League (ANCYL), where the policy was first adopted.
2. Nationalization of Mines, Banks, and Strategic Sectors: The EFF calls for state ownership of the country's mines, banks and other strategic economic sectors. The party argues this will break white economic dominance and ensure national wealth benefits for all South Africans.
3. Building State and Government Capacity: This pillar emphasizes strengthening state institutions, developing government service delivery capacity and creating a developmental state model.
4. Free Quality Education, Healthcare, and Essential Services: Key demands include the fully subsidized education from basic to tertiary level, the implementation of National Health Insurance and free basic services (water, electricity). The EFF has been instrumental in student protests like FeesMustFall.
5. Massive Protected Industrial Development: The party advocates for local industrialization, trade protectionism and job creation through state-led industrial policy
6. Development of the African Economy: This pillar promotes Pan-African economic integration, resistance to neocolonial economic practices and African economic self-sufficiency
7. Open, Accountable, and Corruption-Free Government: The EFF demands government transparency, strong anti-corruption measures and accountability for public officials.

=== Death penalty ===
At the launch of the EFF in 2013, Malema called for a referendum on reintroducing the death penalty, but by 2019 he had reversed this position.

=== Economics ===
The party promised to tackle corruption, provide quality social housing, and provide free primary healthcare and education for all, as well as proposing to expropriate white-owned farmland, nationalise the mining and banking sectors, double welfare grants and the minimum wage, and end the proposed toll system for highways. It has criticised both the dominant African National Congress and the primary opposition party, the Democratic Alliance, for enacting policies that it claims have sold out the black people of South Africa to capitalism as cheap labour. But after the 2016 local elections in South Africa, Malema suggested that the EFF would back the Democratic Alliance in hung-metro areas, while reiterating that it would not form a coalition with any political party.

The EFF has vocally criticised black business owners, particularly in South Africa's mining sector. In a 2015 address at the Oxford Union, Malema spoke out against mining company owner Patrice Motsepe. During further protests in 2015, the EFF delivered demands that included the socialisation of the mining sector and called for more explicit targets for the 26% BEE ownership required by law. The EFF is a vocal proponent of expanding the role of South African state-owned enterprises in the national economy. In a public address at Marikana in the Rustenburg area, near the site of the Marikana massacre, Malema blamed mining companies for poverty in the region and called out platinum mining company Lonmin in particular.

The EFF was the only parliamentary party that opposed the 2018 political party funding bill, a funding transparency law that requires political parties to publish their sources of funding.

=== Foreign policy ===
==== Within Africa ====
The EFF presents itself as a Pan-Africanist party and supports the proposal for a United States of Africa. It has praised former Libyan leader Muammar Gaddafi, promising to implement many of the policies in South Africa that Gaddafi implemented in Libya. The party is against presence of the American military bases in Africa, most notably in Botswana.

The party supports Western Sahara independence from Morocco.

The EFF has strongly criticised the government of Eswatini, one of the last absolute monarchies in the world, advocating for democratic reforms in the country and the removal of borders between it and South Africa. The party has supported several efforts at change in Eswatini, ranging from trying to shut down the Eswatini-South Africa border with protest action to criticizing the electoral process in the country.

The EFF is critical of France's presence in Africa; in 2022 it picketed and ultimately barricaded the country's embassy in Pretoria. The French ambassador to South Africa criticised the EFF for scapegoating France as the source of all Africa's problems. Following the death of Queen Elizabeth the EFF announced that it would not mourn her death, instead saying, "she never once acknowledged the atrocities her family inflicted on native people that Britain invaded across the world."

==== Outside Africa ====
The EFF opposes Zionism, and is strongly critical of Israel and its conflict with the Palestinians, calling the country "evil" and advocating its destruction. During the Gaza war, Malema said the party supported Hamas and that should the party win the 2024 election it would send arms to assist the organisation.

The EFF officially supports Russia's 2022 invasion of Ukraine, commending what it has called Russia's "anti-imperialist programme" against NATO. During the Lady R incident, the party stated its support for any prospect of South African exports of military equipment to Russia that might assist in its invasion of Ukraine.

The party supports closer bilateral relations between South Africa and China and considers Taiwan an "integral part" of the People's Republic of China; it has called the Chinese Communist Party the "torch-bearer for all Marxist–Leninist formations in the world".

=== LGBT+ rights ===
The EFF supports the rights of the LGBT+ community in Africa and officially condemns laws that seek to ban homosexuality. The party was critical of Uganda's 2023 Anti-Homosexuality Bill and led a protest outside of the Ugandan embassy in South Africa urging Uganda's president not to sign it into law. Later in 2023, the party was strongly criticized by members of the South African LGBT+ community for inviting Patrick Lumumba, a Kenyan professor known for making homophobic statements and who is publicly supportive of Uganda's 2023 Anti-Homosexuality Bill, to deliver the party's 10th anniversary lecture at the University of Cape Town.

== Support base and prominent members ==
Polling in 2013, 2019, and 2024 found that he party's supporters are younger than average, predominantly male, urban based, and overwhelmingly black.

A November 2013 Ipsos survey found that 49% of EFF supporters were younger than 24, overwhelmingly black (99%) with Sepedi speakers being the largest language group, and mostly male, with women only 33% of the support base. A disproportionate number of supporters live in Malema's home province of Limpopo (28%), while only 1% live in KwaZulu-Natal, a more populous province. A 2018 survey conducted by social research company Citizen Surveys found that around 70% of EFF supporters were between the ages of 18 and 34, overwhelmingly black (97%), mostly based in major metropolitan cities (48%), and predominantly male (62%), with 43% of the support base in Gauteng Province. The party was expected to make an impact in the 2014 general election, taking between 4% and 8% of the national vote. This was potentially enough for the party to hold the balance of power in provinces where the governing African National Congress was in danger of losing its absolute majority. The ANC retained its absolute majority whilst the EFF got 6.35% of the vote in the 2014 election. Polling and analysis in 2024 found that 61% of EFF supporters were 39 years old or younger, 56% were unemployed, 65% resided in urban areas, 51.6% were male, and 97% black with isiXhosa speakers being the largest language group.

=== Notable members ===
High-profile members of the Central Command Team include Fana Mokoena and former member Mbuyiseni Ndlozi (National Spokesperson) who resigned in February 2025. Controversial businessman Kenny Kunene joined the Central Command Team in July 2013 before resigning from the Central Command Team on 20 August and from the organisation on 26 August. On 4 November, it was announced that Dali Mpofu had left the African National Congress (ANC) after 33 years of membership and joined the EFF. In December 2023, former ANC member and Areta leader Carl Niehaus joined the EFF. On 19 August 2024 Malema announced to the party supporters in Soweto that Sinawo Tambo would replace former deputy and member of parliament Floyd Shivambu in parliament.

==== 2024 defections ====
Following electoral losses in the 2024 general election the party experienced a number of high-profile defections to the newly formed uMkhonto weSizwe party (MK). The party's former Limpopo chairperson, Jossey Buthane, defected to the ANC three weeks before the election and said that further defections would happen in the future. Three months after the election, in August, party co-founder and deputy leader Floyd Shivambu defected to MK, as did Mzwanele Manyi. This was followed by Busisiwe Mkhwebane in October, and the party's former chairperson Dali Mpofu in November 2024.

=== Student wing ===
The Economic Freedom Fighters Students Command (EFFSC) was the party's student wing, founded on 16 June 2015. It campaigned for free education, universal access to education and the elimination of registration fees, It disbanded in February 2025 and was replaced by a newly formed youth command following a resolution passed at the party's elective conference in December 2024.

== Criticisms and controversies ==
=== Allegations of foreign ties ===
The ANC has accused the Zimbabwean ruling party, the Zimbabwe African National Union – Patriotic Front (ZANU–PF), of supporting the EFF in order to destabilise the ANC.

In 2019, President Cyril Ramaphosa said during a debate in Parliament that he had received numerous intelligence reports that the EFF "is an MI6 project" (a project of the foreign arm of British intelligence agencies). The party's chairperson, Dali Mpofu, said he would shut down the EFF if the claims turned out to be true but he was removed as chairman in the same year.

=== Alleged corruption ===
==== Tenders ====
A number of investigative journalists have accused the EFF of using its influence to earn improper payments from government suppliers in cities where it has significant representative power. An investigation by the amaBhungane centre for investigative journalism found that the EFF received R500,000 in kickbacks from a company in return for a R1.26 billion contract to manage a fleet of vehicles used by the City of Johannesburg with the Democratic Alliance's tacit acquiescence. Another investigation alleges that the party improperly benefited from the awarding of a fuel supply contract for the City of Tshwane netting the party R15 million from successful contractors.

==== VBS Mutual Bank ====
Following the publication of a South African Reserve Bank report into the collapse of VBS Mutual Bank implicating former EFF deputy president Floyd Shivambu's brother media reports came out alleging that Shivambu, who joined Jacob Zuma's UMkhonto weSizwe (political party) in August 2024, received R10 million in illicit payments from VBS prior to it being placed under curatorship in March 2018. Prior to the publication of the Reserve Bank's report the EFF criticised the Reserve Bank for placing VBS under curatorship and accused it of victimising VBS on racial grounds. The EFF stated that it had seen no evidence that Shivambu received the R10 million and called for government to recapitalise VBS Mutual Bank whilst also taking legal action against those mentioned in the Reserve Bank report. A follow-up investigation by the Daily Maverick alleged that the EFF illicitly received R1.8 million of VBS money through a network of proxy companies with the party's leadership (notably Shivambu and Malema) also illicitly receiving money though this network. After being approached by the Mail & Guardian for comment on his personal financial expenses Floyd Shivambu admitted that money from VBS, channeled through his brother, was used to buy his Range Rover Sport valued at R680,000. By June 2021 Shivambu's brother had repaid R4.55 million and admitted to taking VBS money.

A follow-up investigation by the Daily Maverick found that R454,000 of VBS money was used to pay for the 2017 EFF birthday celebration. It also found that a total of R16.1 million was channeled through a Shivambu associated company largely for the benefit of the EFF. An additional investigation traced financial statements from an account that received VBS funds and allegedly controlled by Julius Malema; leading the author of the investigation to estimate that Malema received and directly benefited from R5.3-million illegally taken from VBS. Additional media reports in October 2019, alleged that the party received R4 million of VBS funds into a slush fund that was channeled to Malema via a company named Santaclara Trading.

A former member of the EFF's leadership accused the party leadership of accepting donations from VBS Mutual Bank prior to its collapse. The South African Parliament's joint ethics committee found that Shivambu had received at least R180,000, in three payments, of VBS money from his brother's company Sgameka Projects Pty Ltd in 2017; but found no evidence that Malema received any VBS related funds.

Malema has forwarded a conspiracy theory that the VBS collapse was part of a plot intended to damage the EFF.

After former VBS chairman Tshifhiwa Matodzi was sentenced to 15 years in prison in July 2024, the Democratic Alliance and ActionSA demanded that police conduct a fresh investigation of Malema and Shivambu.

=== Connections to violence ===
In October 2018, a group of 17 former EFF members and councillors in the Northern Cape accused the party's senior leadership of corruption and sexual exploitation of more junior female party members. Four months later, two former female EFF employees claimed that party leadership had intimidated and engaged in acts of bullying behaviour towards them and other party staff members.

Following the temporary removal of eight EFF provincial MPs from Gauteng Provincial Legislature, a large number of EFF members protesting against the ruling stormed the provincial legislature building.

During violent university protests characterized by arson and vandalism, EFF Youth leader Omphile Seleke posted instructions on how to make petrol bombs on social media.

A Vodacom store in Polokwane was damaged and looted by EFF members following a presentation by Corruption Watch at the 2018 Vodacom Awards, which included an image depicting EFF leaders Malema and Shivambu as "abusers of Democracy".

Following the 2019 State of the Nation address in parliament by President Ramaphosa, EFF MP Marshall Dlamini physically assaulted a member of the presidential security team after a disagreement between EFF MPs and security.

During an October 2022 speech to members of the Western Cape EFF branch, Malema said that party members should "never be scared to kill" in pursuit of what he called the party's revolution. The South African Human Rights Commission (SAHRC) ruled that the statement—along with seven others made by the EFF, such as "a revolutionary must become a cold killing machine motivated by pure hate"—constituted hate speech. The EFF disputed the SAHRC's ruling.

==== Intimidation of journalists and the media ====
Journalist Ranjeni Munusamy lodged an affidavit in December 2018 detailing threatening remarks, intimidation, harassment, and personal attacks made by party members, including Malema, towards her and other journalists targeted by the party. The affidavit was supported by the South African National Editors Forum and other notable South African journalists such as Max du Preez, Pauli VanWyk, Adriaan Jurgens Basson, and Barry Bateman. The EFF denied any involvement in attacks on Munusamy and other journalists.

"We need to ask the IEC how such a party can be on the ballot box. It threatens journalists. It encourages its supporters to make rape threats and sexual assault threats. It wants to dictate what I can do as a journalist."
—Karima Brown

South African political journalist Karima Brown was the target of verbal abuse and threats of violence by EFF supporters following the EFF's publication of her personal contact details. This led to charges being laid by the police and Equity Court against the party amid speculation that the instance might be in breach of South Africa's Electoral Code of Conduct. Parties in breach of the code risk having their registration to run in elections revoked. Malema said that journalists have no privileges, accused Brown of being a state agent, and denied that EFF supporters were making threatening remarks. The court found in Brown's favour and ruled that the EFF had contravened the South African electoral code by inciting its supporters to harass her.

Following the publication of an article by the amaBhungane Centre for investigative journalism looking into allegations of corruption by the EFF, the party controversially announced that it would ban both amaBhungane and the Daily Maverick from its public events and that they would be treated as enemies of the party.

In 2018, the party's former deputy president, Floyd Shivambu, was filmed and charged with assaulting Netwerk24 journalist Adrian de Kock in Parliament. In January 2020, the EFF was forced to publicly apologize and pay damages following a Gauteng High Court judgment that the party had made and spread false allegations that two journalists, Thandeka Gqubule and Anton Harber, had been apartheid-era U.S. 'StratCom' agents.

=== Legal issues ===
In May 2019, the EFF was found guilty of defamation of character by the South Gauteng High Court and ordered to pay R500,000 in damages to former Finance Minister Trevor Manuel. Manuel brought the EFF and its leader Malema to court after they had alleged that the appointment of Edward Kieswetter as commissioner of SARS by Manuel was the result of nepotism. Following the judgement, Manuel stated that he would be donating the R500,000 in damages to victims of the VBS Mutual Bank scandal in which the EFF is alleged to have participated.

Following a string of court-case losses for inciting supporters to commit acts of intimidation (against journalist Brown), land invasion (which case was brought by AfriForum), or defamation of character (against ANC politician Manuel), the party was left with combined court costs amounting to almost R1 million.

==== Attacking the judiciary ====
The judicial monitoring organisation Judges Matter and the South African Ministry of Justice have condemned the EFF and its leader Malema for making unsubstantiated comments that, according to Judges Matter, are "an attack on the judiciary, a threat to judicial independence, and almost certainly a violation of the Constitution". This followed accusations Malema made in a criminal case against him for illegally discharging a firearm in a stadium. Malema accused the magistrate of incompetence and corruption when the magistrate refused to dismiss the case. Malema went on to make unsubstantiated accusations that the judgement was part of a conspiracy against him or his party. In addition to Malema, other senior EFF members—such as Dali Mpofu and Griffiths Madonsela—have made accusations, without evidence, against the judiciary and attacked the character of individual judges.

=== Racism and ethnic prejudice ===
Since its establishment, the EFF has made a number of controversial racially or ethnically based statements about a number of South African minority groups, particularly white South Africans and Asian South Africans. The party has been criticized for adopting a biological interpretation of race that allows the EFF to easily generalize and attribute racism to particular groups or individuals based on their demographic classification; they are in turn targeted for racial prejudice by the party. This has had a polarizing and radicalizing impact on South African politics. Leaders of the party have targeted a number of public servants, journalists, and communities based on their race.

==== Anti-white racism ====
During a 2016 political rally, Malema said, "We are not calling for the slaughter of white people, at least for now." When asked for comment by a news agency, ANC spokesperson Zizi Kodwa said there would be no comment from the ANC, as Malema "was addressing his own party supporters". While still the ANCYL leader, Malema was taken to the Equality Court by AfriForum for repeatedly singing "dubul' ibhunu", meaning "shoot the Boer". The ANC supported Malema, though AfriForum and the ANC reached a settlement before the appeal case was due to be argued in the Supreme Court of Appeal. A 2022 hate-speech case against Malema by AfriForum for singing the same song found that the song was not hate speech.

South Africa's Independent Electoral Commission disqualified EFF councillor Thabo Mabotja from the 2016 local elections due to a tweet by Mabotja calling for the hacking and killing of white South Africans. The EFF formally welcomed the commission's decision and renounced Mabotja.

At a political rally in 2018, Malema told supporters to "go after a white man", a reference to Nelson Mandela Bay mayor Athol Trollip, adding, "we are cutting the throat of whiteness". This led to the Democratic Alliance accusing the EFF's leader of racism and not sharing the more tolerant views of South Africans broadly. The EFF later said the reference to the "throat of whiteness" was "a metaphorical reference to destroying white privilege" and was "not referring or advocating harm to white people".

Following the death of former Zimbabwean President Robert Mugabe, Malema tweeted a number of controversial quotes from the late Mugabe that were malicious towards white people, most notably "The only white man you can trust is a dead white man." The SAHRC condemned the quote and stated that it would be taking Malema to court for spreading hate speech.

==== Anti-Indian/Asian racism ====
The South African Minority Rights Equality Movement initiated a court case against Malema for inciting racial sentiment after he stated that a "majority of Indians are racist" at an EFF Youth Day rally in 2018.

The EFF was criticized by the South African Council of Churches, the Ahmed Kathrada Foundation, and the ANC for comparing Public Enterprises Minister Pravin Gordhan to a "dog" while protesting against the Zondo Commission inquiry into government corruption. The EFF also accused the anti-corruption investigators of being members of an "Indian cabal", in reference to Indian South Africans making up the investigative team. The EFF also retaliated against Gordhan by accusing him and his daughter of corruption. These accusations were proven false and Gordhan laid charges of defamation against Malema, stating that the EFF's "determined defence of corruption and the corrupt, using personal attacks, racism and alleged hate speech is not acceptable and must be challenged". The Equality Court declared that the EFF was not guilty of hate speech in its statements relating to Gordhan. The EFF leadership and its supporters have been criticized for using Gordhan's second name, Jamnadas, as a racial dog whistle to highlight his Indian ethnicity in a pejorative way and question his status as a South African on social media.

ANC member and government minister, the late Jackson Mthembu, accused the EFF of being racist and having a "deep-seated hatred" for Indian South Africans when he criticized the party's pursuit of Gordhan during a parliamentary debate.

=== Ideological criticisms ===
==== Accusations of militarism and dictatorial practices ====
In 2013, the National Union of Metalworkers of South Africa criticized the EFF's "military command structure" and its failure to clarify who should take ownership over nationalized sections of the economy. In April 2019, a former member of the EFF's central command, Thembinkosi Rawula, accused senior party leaders of dictatorial leadership practices. The EFF denied Rawula's accusation and stated that it would sue him for defamation as well as make the party's financial information public.

==== Allegations of fascism and misogyny ====
The party's practices and racial views have been widely defined as "fascist" by journalists, commentators, academics, and other political parties. Some commentators have compared Malema and the party's cult of personality around him to Adolf Hitler and Benito Mussolini. The ANC's National Executive Committee has called the EFF a "proto-fascist party run dictatorially". Gareth van Onselen, who worked for the Democratic Alliance for 12 years, accused the party of being "fascist" due to its legacy of racial prejudice in a 2018 article. In mid-June 2016, a group calling itself "Anonymous Africa", claiming to be associated with the hacktivist group Anonymous, condemned the party and perpetrated a DDoS attack on the EFF's website for what it called the party's "nationalist socialist rhetoric". South African academic Vishwas Satgar has argued that the EFF is not comparable to fascist parties of the 20th century but is instead a black neo-fascist party based on the ideologies of centralized state ownership and control along with African nativism. According to Satgar, its appeals to "race baiting, nativist nationalism, hypermasculinity, and disposition to violence are similar in these respects to the new fascisms rising in Europe, the United States, and India."

Malema has been criticized in the media for the party's lack of focus on feminist politics and the prevalence of sexism and misogyny among leading members. Feminists have argued that the party's militaristic language undermines its commitment to women's rights, while disaffected female party members have criticized the EFF for having a patriarchal power structure.

== Election results ==
The EFF's performance by region in the 2024 South African general election

=== National elections ===
==== National Assembly ====
Election	Total votes	Share of vote	Seats	+/–	Government
2014	1,169,259	6.35%	25 / 400	▲25	in opposition
2019	1,881,521	10.79%	44 / 400	▲19	in opposition
2024	1,529,961	9.52%	39 / 400	▼5	in opposition

==== National Council of Provinces ====
Election	Total # of seats won	+/–	Government
2014	7 / 90	▲7	in opposition
2019	11 / 90	▲4	in opposition
2024	10 / 90	▼1	in opposition

=== Provincial elections ===
Election	Eastern Cape		Free State		Gauteng		Kwazulu-Natal		Limpopo		Mpumalanga		North-West		Northern Cape		Western Cape	
Election	%	Seats	%	Seats	%	Seats	%	Seats	%	Seats	%	Seats	%	Seats	%	Seats	%	Seats
2014	3.48%	2/63	8.15%	2/30	10.30%	8/73	1.85%	2/80	10.74%	6/49	6.26%	2/30	13.21%	5/33	4.96%	2/30	2.11%	1/42
2019	7.84%	5/63	12.58%	4/30	14.69%	11/73	9.71%	8/80	14.43%	7/49	12.79%	4/30	18.36%	6/33	9.71%	3/30	4.04%	2/42
2024	10.14%	8/63	13.52%	4/30	12.93%	11/73	2.26%	2/80	14.12%	9/49	13.87%	7/30	17.37%	7/33	13.25%	4/30	5.30%	2/42

=== Municipal elections ===
Election	Votes	Seats	%
2016	3,202,679	761	8.31%
2021	3,223,828	982	10.54%
2026		577	6.22%

== See also ==
- Black First Land First
- Economic Freedom Fighters of Swaziland
- Economic Freedom Party
- Namibian Economic Freedom Fighters
- Pan Africanist Congress of Azania
- Socialist Party of Azania
- Workers and Socialist Party
