= Julius Malema =

South African politician (born 1981)

Julius Malema MP
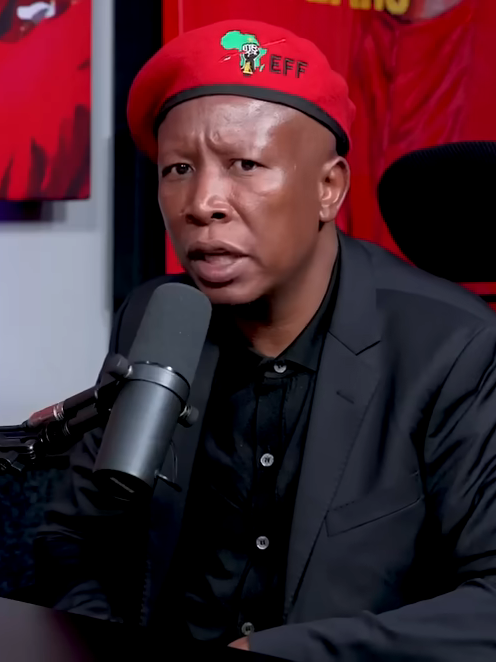
- Malema in 2024

President of the Economic Freedom Fighters
- Incumbent
- Assumed office 26 July 2013
- Deputy: Godrich Gardee
- Preceded by: Party established

9th President of the African National Congress Youth League
- In office April 2008 – April 2012
- Deputy: Andile Lungisa; Ronald Lamola
- Preceded by: Fikile Mbalula
- Succeeded by: Collen Maine

Member of the National Assembly
- Incumbent
- Assumed office 21 May 2014
- Constituency: Limpopo

President of the Congress of South African Students
- In office 1999–2002

Personal details
- Born: Julius Sello Malema; 3 March 1981 (age 45) Seshego, Transvaal Province, South Africa
- Party: EFF (since 2013)
- Other political affiliations: ANC (1990–2012)
- Spouse: Mantwa Matlala (m. 2014)
- Children: 3
- Education: University of South Africa; University of the Witwatersrand
- Occupation: Politician
- Nickname: Juju

Julius Sello Malema (born 3 March 1981) is a South African politician and activist who is the founder and leader of the Economic Freedom Fighters (EFF), a far-left communist and black nationalist political party, since 2013. Before founding the EFF, he served as president of the African National Congress Youth League (ANCYL) from 2008 until his expulsion from the party in 2012.

As a child, Malema joined the ANC and was a highly engaged member while growing up; he was ultimately elected president of its Youth League in April 2008 under controversial circumstances. While president, he was an early proponent of nationalising South Africa's mining industry and expropriating land without compensation. He rose to national prominence as an outspoken supporter of Jacob Zuma, then ANC president and later President of South Africa.

However, Malema's relationship with Zuma became severely strained following numerous disciplinary deliberations against him by the ANC. By 2012, he was campaigning for Zuma to be removed from office ahead of the ANC's 53rd National Conference. In April of that year, months before the conference was due to take place, Malema was expelled from the ANC for bringing the party into disrepute. The following year, he founded the EFF and was elected to the National Assembly in 2014, where the party won 25 seats.

Malema has been embroiled in a variety of legal issues throughout his political career. In March 2010, he was convicted of hate speech for demeaning comments about Zuma's rape accuser. In 2012, he was charged with fraud, money laundering, and racketeering. After numerous postponements, the case was dismissed by the courts in 2015 due to repeated delays by the National Prosecuting Authority. In 2022, Malema gave a speech against a white man who had attacked EFF members. As a consequence of that speech, in 2025, Malema was convicted of hate speech for, according to the court, "calling for [whites] to be killed". He has applied for an appeal to a higher court.

On 1 October 2025, Malema was convicted of five offences, including the illegal possession of a firearm and ammunition, illegally firing a weapon in public, and reckless endangerment. The offences related to an EFF rally at which Malema fired between 14 and 15 live rounds on a stage, in front of approximately 20,000 supporters. In April 2026, he was sentenced to five years in prison for these convictions. Under the Constitution of South Africa, anyone who receives a sentence of 12 months or more without the option of a fine, and who does not have the judgement overturned on appeal, is barred from serving as a Member of Parliament for five years.

== Early life and education ==
Born on 3 March 1981, Malema was born and raised in the township of Seshego near Polokwane in the Transvaal, in the region now known as Limpopo. A second born to his mother, while grieving the death of his sister, he was born- hence the name Sello (Cry). Then the one born after him also passed on in infancy. His family is Northern Sotho, and his mother was a domestic worker and a single parent. After his mother died, he was raised by his grandmother, who died in May 2019.

=== Student politics ===
According to Malema, he joined the Masupatsela ("trailblazers") movement of the African National Congress (ANC) at the age of nine or ten. His main task at the time was to remove National Party posters. He has claimed to have received military training at the age of 13 but this claim has been disputed for lack of corroborating witnesses. In 1995, Malema joined the ANC Youth League and became the chairperson of his local branch in Seshego and of the regional branch in broader Capricorn. In 1997, he became the provincial chairperson of the Congress of South African Students (COSAS) in Limpopo. He was elected as national president of COSAS in 2001.

=== Education ===
Malema matriculated from Mohlakaneng High School in Seshego. In 2010, he completed a two-year diploma in youth development through the University of South Africa (UNISA). Also at UNISA, he subsequently completed a Bachelor of Arts in communications and African languages in March 2016 an Honours degree in philosophy in 2017. In 2018, he enrolled in a master's degree programme at the University of the Witwatersrand.

== ANC Youth League ==
=== Election as president: April 2008 ===
By 2008, Malema was the provincial secretary of the Limpopo branch of the ANC Youth League and a leading contender for election as president of the national league. His candidacy had the support of outgoing league president Fikile Mbalula, while outgoing league secretary-general Sihle Zikalala supported the more moderate candidate, Saki Mofokeng. Following an extremely heated campaign and a disorderly plenary, Malema was elected ANC Youth League president at the league's 23rd National Conference in Bloemfontein in April 2008. He received 1,833 votes against Mofokeng's 1,696 votes and was elected alongside a slate of allies, including Andile Lungisa as deputy president.

The outcome of the vote was immediately disputed, including by conference delegates who claimed that incidents of intimidation had prevented them from voting. The conference devolved into disorder, with some delegates throwing chairs, and adjourned without concluding its business. Malema later criticised the "unbecoming conduct" shown by delegates at the conference. Following an intervention by the mainstream ANC, the league held a special closed congress in Johannesburg in June. On the recommendation of ANC secretary general Gwede Mantashe, Mofokeng agreed to affirm the results of the election held in April.

=== Support for Zuma: 2008–2010 ===
By the time of his election as Youth League president, Malema, like most of the league's membership, was a strong supporter of ANC president Jacob Zuma and an outspoken critic of former ANC president Thabo Mbeki. In June 2008, he defended Zuma – then facing prosecution on corruption charges – at a rally in Thaba 'Nchu, Free State, famously (and to broad condemnation) announcing, "We are prepared to die for Zuma... We are prepared to take up arms and kill for Zuma". In September, he vowed to "eliminate any force" that sought to block Zuma from the national presidency.

Ahead of the 2009 general election, Malema was nominated to stand for election as a Member of Parliament but declined on the grounds that Parliament was "for old people". Nonetheless, he campaigned energetically for the ANC and for Zuma, the party's presidential candidate, in the election. In April 2009, for example, he and the rest of a league delegation were asked to leave Port Elizabeth's Dora Nginza Hospital, where they had been canvassing support in the wards. After the election, Malema launched a programme of school visits in an apparent attempt to reach the country's youth. Kgalema Motlanthe, then the ANC deputy president and Deputy President of South Africa, criticised the visits as disruptive to the students' education.

Although Malema remained an ally of Zuma in the months after his election as President of South Africa in May 2009, they fell out publicly by mid-2010. Malema later explained that he had turned on Zuma when he realised Zuma was incapable of fulfilling the left-wing policy agenda that had secured his election as ANC president in 2007; according to Malema, Zuma took a harsher stance towards the league only after it rejected him. According to an alternative interpretation, however, Zuma adjusted his stance towards Malema and the league in 2010 – notably by instituting disciplinary proceedings against Malema – because he realised that Malema's outspoken militancy constituted a political liability for him or a political threat to him.

=== Disciplinary charges: 2010 ===
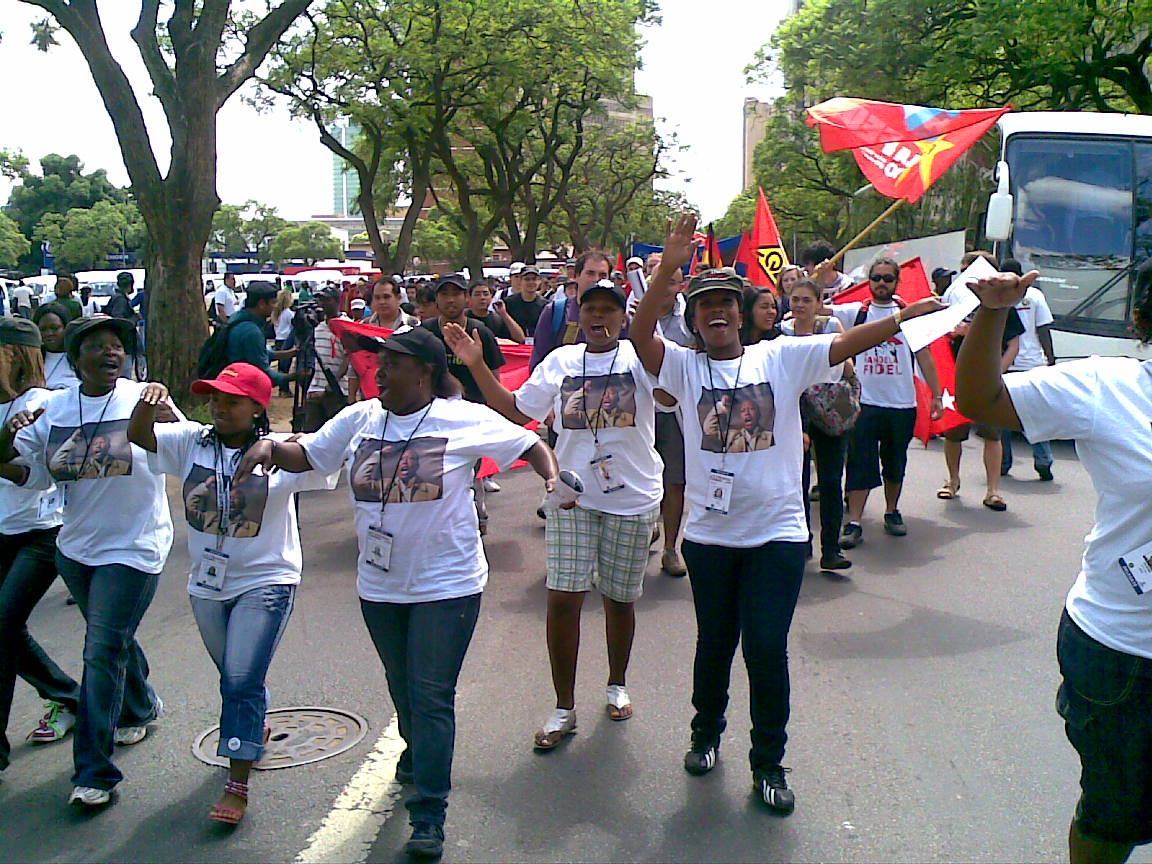
Young activists in Johannesburg wearing t-shirts emblazoned with Malema's face, December 2010

==== Mounting controversy ====
By early 2010, Zuma faced significant pressure, both from the public and from inside the ANC, to curtail Malema's increasingly inflammatory conduct, and the Mail & Guardian reported that Zuma was concerned about being perceived as "a lame duck" with respect to the Youth League. In mid-March 2010, ANC Secretary-General Gwede Mantashe told the media that henceforth ANC members would be punished if they engaged in public feuds with or attacks on one another. At the same time, the ANC National Executive Committee (NEC) released a statement which objected to "the lack of respect which some of the leaders and structures of our movement have for the NEC's decisions", describing it as incompatible with "the ANC's historical mission, its discipline and its protocols". News24 said that both statements were clearly directed at Malema, who had "bad-mouthed almost everyone in the leadership of the governing alliance" and most recently had attacked Finance Minister Pravin Gordhan in the media.

Nonetheless, following this announcement, Malema was involved in a further series of especially well publicised controversies later in March and in early April. The first concerned Malema's singing the controversial struggle song "Dubul' ibhunu" in defiance of a high court ruling, as well as related remarks by Malema about the death of Eugène Terre'Blanche.

Second, from 2 to 5 April 2010, Malema led an ANC Youth League delegation on a controversial working visit to Zimbabwe. The league said that it aimed to use the trip to strengthen its relationship with the ZANU-PF Youth League, as well as to conduct a fact-finding mission on indigenisation. Malema met with Zimbabwean President Robert Mugabe and other ZANU-PF politicians, and in public statements he was complimentary of ZANU-PF, comparing it favourably to Morgan Tsvangirai's Movement for Democratic Change (MDC). His statements sparked fears in some quarters that the ANC would attempt to imitate ZANU-PF's Land reform in Zimbabwe programme; there were also concerns that Malema's partisan comments would undermine ongoing efforts by Zuma's government to broker a political settlement between ZANU-PF and the MDC. City Press reported that ANC officials had asked the Youth League to postpone its trip, though Malema told the media that Zuma had personally endorsed it.

In addition, on 8 April, Malema received international media attention for his conduct during an altercation with Jonah Fisher, a BBC journalist. At a media briefing about his visit to Zimbabwe, Malema mocked the MDC for having offices in affluent Sandton and became enraged when Fisher interjected to point out that Malema himself lived in Sandton. During the ensuing exchange, Malema called Fisher a "bastard", a "bloody agent", and a "small boy". The following day, Malema said that he was "not remorseful", describing Fisher as "disrespectful" and the United Kingdom as a country "whose media always undermine the credibility and integrity of African leaders". The ANC condemned his conduct in a statement.

==== Rebuke and charges ====
On 10 April 2010, Zuma held a press conference in Durban to address these and other recent controversies involving Malema. The press conference was later remembered as a turning point in the relationship between Zuma and Malema, constituting the strongest rebuke yet offered by the former of the latter. In connection with "Dubul' ibhunu", Zuma said that defying the high court's ruling would contravene a direct instruction from the ANC and therefore would amount to "undermining the leadership of the ANC", would additionally "make a mockery of our judicial system", and "should not be tolerated". He distanced himself from Malema's remarks about Zimbabwe, reiterating the ANC's commitment to impartiality in the Zimbabwean peace process, and said that Malema's treatment of Jonah Fisher was "regrettable and unacceptable, regardless of any provocation on [Fisher's] part". More broadly, Zuma described Malema's recent conduct as "alien to the ANC", reminded the Youth League that it was subject to the ANC's rules and policies, and implied that Malema would be subject to internal disciplinary procedures.

In the aftermath of Zuma's press conference, Malema remained defiant and was quoted telling the media that "even President Thabo Mbeki", Zuma's former political rival, had not responded so strongly in public "when he differed with the Youth League". The following week, the ANC announced that Malema would face formal internal disciplinary proceedings, with charges stemming from his public remarks about Zuma as well as from the incidents of ill discipline already noted by Zuma. The charges were pursued in the ANC's National Disciplinary Committee, then chaired by Derek Hanekom and staffed by various ANC leaders viewed as unsympathetic towards Malema; Malema was represented in the proceedings by ANC Treasurer-General Mathews Phosa.

==== Plea deal ====
In May 2010, Malema reached a plea bargain with the disciplinary committee. As part of the deal, he was required to pay a R10,000 fine to a youth development project, to attend anger management classes, and to attend the ANC's political school for 20 days. He was also required to issue an unconditional public apology to Zuma, the ANC, and the public for having publicly undermined Zuma in the aftermath of Zuma's rebuke. Most of the charges against him were withdrawn, but he was formally found guilty, in relation to his public attack on Zuma, for having provoked division within the ANC in contravention of the party's constitution. Under the terms of the plea bargain, the National Disciplinary Committee ruled that Malema's ANC membership would be summarily suspended if he was found guilty of repeating this offence within the next two years.

=== Re-election: June 2011 ===
As the end of Malema's first term in the presidency approached, observers expected him to face a strong challenge to his re-election bid, probably from his deputy Andile Lungisa. In the run-up to the next national league conference, a series of highly contested provincial conferences were held. In Malema's home province of Limpopo, the conference degenerated into violence, and Malema reportedly had police eject his rivals and journalists from the venue.

Nonetheless, at the Youth League's national elective conference in Midrand on 17 June 2011, Malema was elected to a second term as league president. He stood unopposed after his presumptive opponent, Lebogang Maile, declined a nomination to stand against him. Ronald Lamola succeeded Lungisa as deputy league president.

=== Expulsion: 2011–2012 ===
==== Botswana tirade ====
On 31 July 2011, at a briefing following a Boksburg meeting of the ANC Youth League's National Executive Committee, Malema made a series of controversial comments about the political situation in neighbouring Botswana. He described the ruling Botswana Democratic Party (BDP) as "a foot stool of imperialism, a security threat to Africa and always under constant puppetry of the United States", and he announced the Youth League's plan to establish a "Botswana command team" which would assist Botswana's opposition parties in uniting to oppose the BDP's "puppet regime". In addition, in what was viewed as a "veiled swipe" against Zuma and his cabinet, he said that there had been "a vacuum on the ideological and political leadership of Africa" since Thabo Mbeki's departure from the South African government; he believed this explained the flaws in the South African response to the Libyan and Ivorian crises.

==== Disciplinary proceedings ====
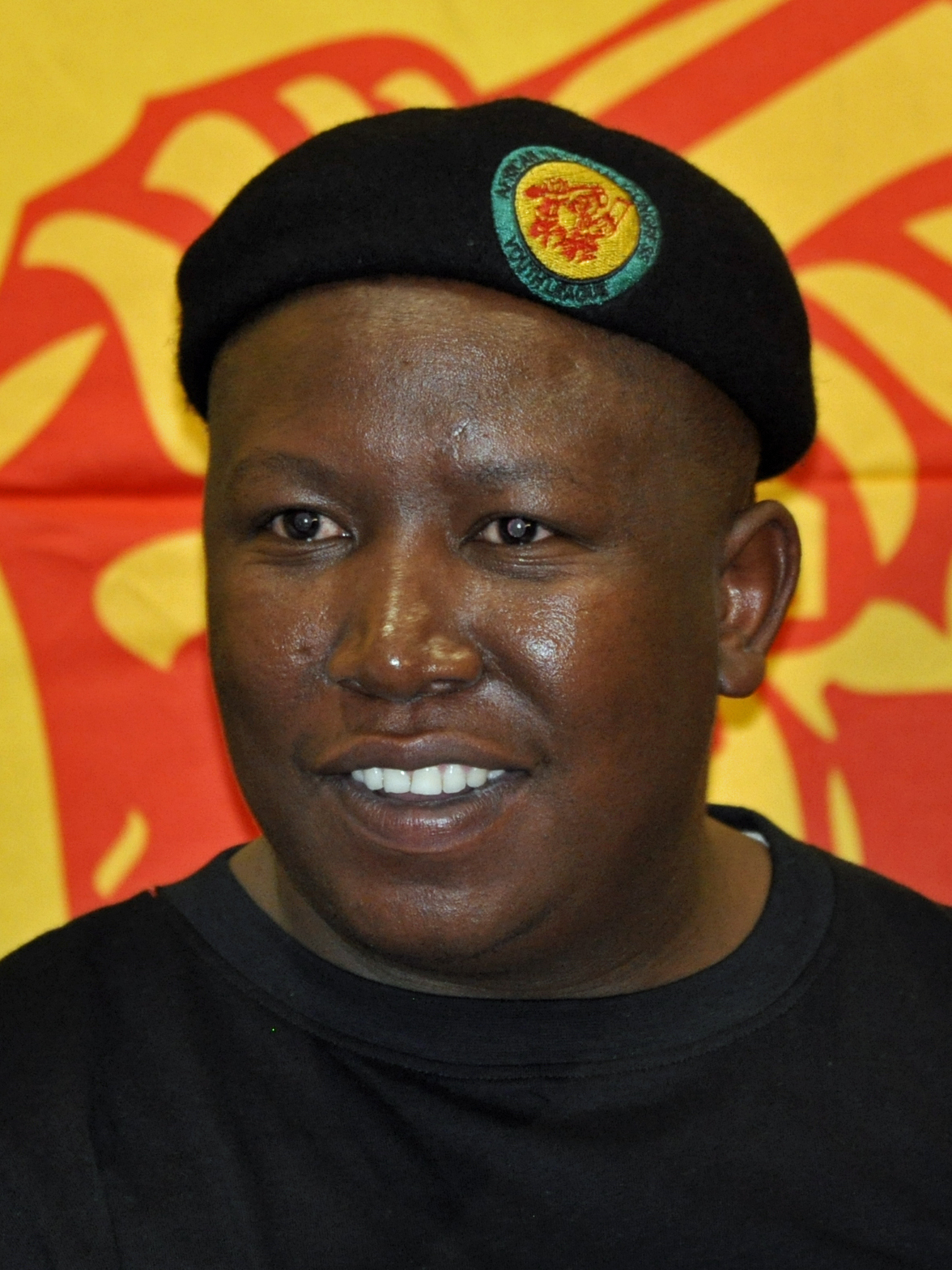
Malema in September 2011

Malema and the Youth League withdrew the statement about Botswana a fortnight later, but the Independent Online reported that his comments had "finally snapped the patience of the party's elders". On 22 August 2011, the ANC announced that Malema had been charged with bringing the ANC into disrepute and would face internal disciplinary proceedings. He was charged alongside league spokesman Floyd Shivambu, and all of the rest of the league's top leadership – deputy president Ronald Lamola, secretary-general Sindiso Magaqa, deputy secretary-general Kenetswe Mosenogi, and treasurer-general Pule Mabe – were later added to the charge sheet.

When the hearing began on 30 August 2011 at the ANC's headquarters at Luthuli House in central Johannesburg, a rally of Malema's supporters devolved into violence as some of those present broke through the police barricades and threw glass bottles and stones at police officers and journalists. The police dispersed the gathering with a water cannon, mace, and a warning shot. The violence was condemned by senior ANC leaders and Malema addressed the crowd to appeal for restraint.

==== Finding and appeals ====
On 10 November, the ANC National Disciplinary Committee, still chaired by Derek Hanekom, announced that it had found Malema guilty of contravening the party constitution for his remarks about Botswana, including those "which sought to portray the ANC government and its leadership under President Zuma in a negative light in relation to the African agenda and which had the potential to sow division and disunity in the ANC". Hanekom said that Malema's remarks had been "reckless and baseless" and had "damaged the standing of the ANC and South Africa's international reputation", though he was found not guilty on separate charges of racism and inciting hatred. Shivambu was likewise found guilty of an offence for issuing the league's statement on Botswana, as well as for swearing at a journalist.

As a result of its finding, the National Disciplinary Committee suspended Malema from the ANC for five years and required him to vacate his position as president of the ANC Youth League. Malema publicly expressed his intention to appeal the ruling and disparaged the disciplinary process as politically motivated and an attempt to "settle scores". On 4 February 2012, his appeal was dismissed, but the committee said that it would allow him to present arguments in respect of mitigation of sanction. Following further oral arguments, on 29 February, the committee released its decision, which not only dismissed Malema's arguments on mitigation but expelled him from the party entirely. The committee said that, in addition to being a repeat offender, Malema had shown no remorse and had refused to accept the ANC's decisions, suggesting that "the likelihood of him respecting the ANC Constitution is remote". On 24 April 2012, Malema exhausted the appeals process when the chairperson of the internal appeals committee, Cyril Ramaphosa, confirmed that his expulsion had been upheld.

== Economic Freedom Fighters ==
Following his expulsion from the ANC, Malema was a prominent figure in criticising the government's actions during the August 2012 Marikana massacre. Visiting the scene of the shootings, he called for Zuma's resignation and the establishment of a commission of inquiry; Al Jazeera wondered whether the controversy over Marikana would help resurrect his political career.

He also made controversial remarks during a visit to Zimbabwe in October 2012, saying that white people in Africa had appropriated mineral resources belonging to indigenous people and that compensating those affected by land expropriation would be tantamount to "thanking them with money for killing our people". He said, "Seeing blood is not what we are scared of. As long as that blood delivers what belongs to us, we are prepared to go to that extent".

=== Foundation of Economic Freedom Fighters ===
In June 2013, Malema began to canvas for his political party called the Economic Freedom Fighters (EFF). The South African president Jacob Zuma, at a meeting with the SA National Editors' Forum, stated that the ruling party does not see this development as a threat. While still on trial for money laundering and racketeering charges Malema started appealing for funds for the new political party.

Malema's visit to Nigerian religious leader T.B. Joshua for 'spiritual blessings' in August 2013 with some EFF members also elicited controversy and media attention.

At the party's inaugural national elective conference in Bloemfontein in December 2014, Malema was elected, unopposed, as president of the EFF. Floyd Shivambu, who was ejected from the ANC Youth League at the same time as Malema, was elected his deputy. Both Malema and Shivambu were re-elected unopposed in December 2019. Floyd Shivambu joined Jacob Zuma's MK Party on 15 August 2024.

=== Member of Parliament: 2014–2022 ===
In the 2014 general election, less than a year after the party's launch, the EFF won 25 seats in the National Assembly, the lower house of the South African Parliament. Malema initially threatened to challenge the election results in court, but ultimately accepted the outcome – although in 2016 he continued to claim that the ANC had rigged the election in Gauteng. He was sworn in as a Member of the National Assembly on 21 May 2014. He was re-elected to the seat in the 2019 general election and has sat on various portfolio committees.

Malema has been ejected from Parliament several times. In June 2014, he was ejected from the State of the Nation debate after he refused to withdraw a statement to the effect that the ANC government had murdered mineworkers during the Marikana massacre. He and several other EFF members were ejected from Zuma's 2015 State of the Nation address after they loudly insisted that they be permitted to question Zuma about the Nkandlagate scandal; Malema said in response that South Africa was a police state. In September 2015, he was forcibly removed from the house by the sergeant-at-arms, and subsequently suspended for five days, after refusing to retract the accusation that Deputy President Cyril Ramaphosa was a "murderer" because of his actions during the Marikana massacre. He was forcibly ejected again during Zuma's State of the Nation addresses in 2016 and 2017.

==== Comments on white genocide conspiracy theory ====
On 23 August 2018, Malema spoke out against the white genocide conspiracy theory and was critical of comments made by United States President Donald Trump, after he had instructed his Secretary of State Mike Pompeo to investigate South African farm attacks. Claiming it was "absolute rubbish to say there's white genocide", Malema said that "South Africans would not be intimidated by Mr Trump" and that the US President's intervention into their domestic land rights issues "only made them more determined".

At a media briefing at EFF headquarters on the same day, Malema stated "there is actually black genocide in the U.S., they are killing black people in the U.S. [...] black people are even being killed in South Africa". He also made an allegation that "there's a group of white right-wingers who are being trained by Jews in Pretoria to be snipers". The South African Jewish Board of Deputies subsequently issued a statement denouncing Malema, calling his comments "typical of his attention-seeking behaviour" and "aimed at creating racial tension". Malema is Jewish, being lemba.

==== Allusions to violence ====
On a number of occasions, Malema has invited controversy and criticism by making allusions to or threats of violence. In an interview with Al Jazeera broadcast in April 2016, Malema said that if the ANC government continued to respond violently to peaceful protests, "We will run out of patience very soon and we will remove this government through the barrel of a gun". In response the ANC opened a case of treason against him.

At a political rally in November 2016, Malema said that the EFF were "not calling for the slaughter of white people‚ at least for now". The opposition Democratic Alliance (DA) criticised his "violent and threatening language". He repeated the sentiment in 2022, saying that he could not "guarantee I can't or won't call for the slaughter of white people" at some point in the future.

In 2018, at another rally, Malema referred to plans to remove Athol Trollip from his position as mayor of Nelson Mandela Municipality as plans for "cutting the throat of whiteness". DA leader Mmusi Maimane labelled Malema's words "racist attacks" and "racist hatred". Following the death of former Zimbabwean President Robert Mugabe in 2019, Malema tweeted a number of controversial quotes by Mugabe, including, "The only white man you can trust is a dead white man". The South African Human Rights Commission condemned the post and said they would sue Malema for spreading hate speech.

During a 2021 session of the Pan-African Parliament, Malema threatened to kill a Malian Member of the Parliament.

==== 2018 Carnilinx scandal ====
Eyewitness News reported that party leader Julius Malema's family residence in Hyde Park, Johannesburg was owned by and located next door to controversial cigarette businessman and Carnilinx company executive Adriano Mazzotti. The article also stated that Mazzotti donated R200,000 to the EFF for the party's electoral registration for the 2019 election and that fellow Carnilinx executive Kyle Phillips gave a R1 million loan to Malema. Malema stated that his wife rented the property and laid a complaint against the media for publishing the location of his home.

==== Comments on F. W. de Klerk's death ====
On 11 November 2021, the day F. W. de Klerk died, Malema tweeted, "Thank you God", followed by five dancing figure emojis (🕺🏾and 💃), which observers interpreted as a response to de Klerk's death. Malema later applauded the decision, following De Klerk's family wishes, to give De Klerk a private funeral instead of a state funeral.

== Involvement in state contracts ==
Reports regarding Malema's possible involvement in state tenders (contracts) began appearing in November 2009. Questions about his personal lifestyle were raised by the South African media. Some analysts suggest this is also known as being a tenderpreneur, which is the early emergence of a form of kleptocracy, or predatory behaviour by a clique in the ruling elite, to generate personal wealth by capturing resources.

In August 2010, the Public Protector released a report which cleared Malema of involvement in state tenders in Limpopo. The report was received with scepticism in some quarters.

=== Threats to journalists ===
A few weeks after the tender controversy was first reported, the ANC Youth League released the personal details of City Press Investigations Editor Dumisane Lubisi, his wife and his children, including their identity numbers, bank details, residential address and vehicle details. Lubisi had reported on the poor construction quality of the Limpopo projects carried out by Malema's firms. The ANCYL made claims that it had evidence that journalists were corrupt in several respects.

In response, a large group of political journalists complained to various authorities within the ANC and to the South African National Editors' Forum (SANEF) stating that they viewed the release as an attempt to intimidate them into not publishing further stories, and as a threat to media freedom. They further questioned how a political organisation obtained sensitive personal information without breaking the law. The Sowetan newspaper, in an editorial, called the steps to silence journalists "tyrannical", and accused the ANC Youth league of exploiting its closeness to "state and institutional power", to intimidate journalists who wrote about Malema. SANEF also released a statement supporting the journalists. Malema issued a statement that the ANCYL would continue to "expose" journalists.

Journalists Piet Rampedi and Adriaan Basson were subjected to various threats and forms of intimidation while covering a story on corruption by Malema.

=== Investigation by the Hawks ===
While Malema was overseas at a friend's wedding in Mauritius in late October 2011, it was reported in various South African media that Malema faced various charges of corruption, fraud and money laundering – these charges having been brought forward by the special investigative unit the Hawks.

At the core of the allegations is the Ratanang Trust, a trust ostensibly set up by Malema and named for his son – with his son and grandmother listed as beneficiaries – but allegedly is the focal point for payments made by politically connected businessmen in return for lucrative state tenders, mostly in the impoverished Limpopo region. Malema has denied any wrongdoing, while various investigations continue.

A warrant was issued for Malema's arrest in September 2012 on charges of fraud, money laundering and corruption, in relation to a government contract. The warrant was reportedly issued following an investigation into a tender awarded in 2010 to EduSolutions, to distribute textbooks to students in Limpopo. An investigation into the incident was launched by the Special Investigating Unit (SIU), SA Revenue Service (Sars) and the elite police unit, the Hawks, following the discovery of dumped textbooks near a dam in Giyani.

=== Money laundering and tax evasion charges ===
On 26 September 2012, Malema was charged with money laundering, relating to his awarding of lucrative government contracts in Limpopo in return for an alleged R4 million in kickbacks. After a hearing at the court in Polokwane, he was granted bail of R10 000.

In 2013, Malema faced charges of tax evasion to the amount of R16 million after it was revealed that he was linked to companies that obtained other lucrative contracts from the Limpopo government. The case was based on payments made to the Ratanang Family Trust, but Malema reached a compromise with the revenue service in 2014. In 2016 the revenue service claimed that Malema breached the terms of the agreement, and that he was owing R18 million for arrears on his taxes, besides R2 million in interest for the 2005 to 2011 tax years. Malema countered that the Limpopo property deal did not go through and that he had settled all his debts based on the 2014 agreement, and owed nothing.

In February 2013, it was reported that Malema's property would be auctioned off to pay a R16.1 million debt he owed the South African Revenue Service, after he failed to meet payment deadlines for unpaid taxes. Malema entered into a further deal to pay back the money, however, this deal collapsed in March 2015, after Malema failed once again to pay.

== Views and political positions ==
=== LGBTQ+ rights ===
Malema is a proponent for the freedoms of LGBTQ+ individuals within Africa. He has argued that the plight of LGBTQ+ individuals is similar to that of the Palestinians, and people in Eswatini and he has said "as long as the LGBTQ+ community is not free in Uganda, we are not free”. Malema has been heavily critical of the Ugandan government for introducing legislation which criminalises homosexuality.

=== Caster Semenya saga ===
In the spring of 2009, Malema emerged as a vociferous public defender of South African runner Caster Semenya during the international controversy about Semenya's gender that unfolded after the 2009 World Athletics Championships. He criticised Deputy Sports Minister Gert Oosthuizen for calling for Athletics South Africa (ASA) president Leonard Chuene's dismissal, and he harshly criticised the International Association of Athletics Federations (IAAF) for attempting to "impose" on South Africans the concept of intersex, which he argued did not exist in Pedi culture. He also condemned the IAAF's decision to subject Semenya to gender testing, calling it racist and sexist, and argued that South Africa should not allow the tests to proceed.

In October 2009, Malema threatened to "mobilise society" against Nedbank if it did not retract its decision to withdraw its sponsorship of ASA, suggesting (against Nedbank's protestation) that the decision was linked to ASA's support for Semenya. In response to the saga, Anton Alberts of the opposition Freedom Front Plus called on the ANC to recognise Malema as "a dilemma which can no longer be ignored".

=== Nationalisation and land expropriation ===
Malema is a vocal advocate of nationalising South African mines. He first called for nationalisation in July 2009 at a Youth League rally in Krugersdorp, and he argued that the Freedom Charter entailed a pro-nationalisation platform. His opinions on nationalisation are shared by South Africa's large National Union of Mineworkers (NUM). At a public meeting at the University of Western Cape, Malema asked: "Why should we pay for our land?"

He then advocated the seizure of land without compensation and the removal of the "willing buyer, willing seller" principle. At a 16 June Youth Day celebration, Malema accused white South Africans of "stealing land" and again advocated for the redistribution of land without compensation. In April 2010 Malema led a youth delegation to Venezuela to study that country's nationalisation programme.

In early 2010, Malema urged ANC Youth League members to join the South African National Defence Force, and said that there were plans for the Youth League leadership to join the reservist programme. The military training was confirmed in May 2010, with the naval training due to commence in September 2010.

== Legal issues ==
=== Khwezi hate speech: March 2010 ===
In January 2009, Malema told a student gathering at the Cape Peninsula University of Technology that Khwezi, the woman who accused Jacob Zuma of rape in 2005 (of which he was acquitted), "had a nice time" with Zuma because she stayed in the morning to ask for "breakfast and taxi money". Non-profit organisation Sonke Gender Justice filed a complaint in the Equality Court of South Africa and, on 15 March 2010, Malema was convicted of hate speech. He was required to issue an unconditional apology and pay a fine of R50,000 to a centre for abused women.

=== "Shoot the Boer" song: 2010–2022 ===
In March 2010, at a rally at the University of Johannesburg, Malema sang parts of "Dubul' ibhunu", an anti-apartheid song whose lyrics mean "Shoot the Boer" (where "boer" refers roughly to any Afrikaans-speaking white person) in Nguni languages while thousands of his supporters cheered in approval while pointing their fingers in the air like guns. The song had been popularised by ANC Youth League activist Peter Mokaba in the 1990s and the South African Human Rights Commission had denounced it as hate speech in 2007. Malema's revival of the song provoked outrage and a formal complaint by Afriforum.

On 26 March 2010, the South Gauteng High Court ruled the song "unconstitutional and unlawful" as a result of litigation unrelated to Malema. On 1 April 2010, the North Gauteng High Court referred the complaint against Malema to the Equality Court, and in the interim granted an interdict preventing Malema from singing the "Dubul' ibhunu" or "any song of a similar nature which incites violence". In the following week, in the aftermath of the murder of Eugène Terre'Blanche, a white supremacist leader, on 3 April, the ANC instructed its members to be "circumspect" in singing the song in the near future, out of wariness that the party might be scapegoated by the white right-wing. Malema defied the ANC directive and indeed made "Dubul' ibhunu" his "signature tune", one of several instances of insubordination which was raised during ANC disciplinary proceedings against him in April 2010.

A hate speech complaint against Malema, lodged by Afriforum in 2010, reached trial in 2011. Among the witnesses who testified in Malema's defence was Winnie Madikizela-Mandela. On 12 September 2011, Malema was convicted of hate speech. The ruling carried no criminal penalty but Malema was required to pay costs.

In 2020, Afriforum again sued Malema in the Equality Court in connection with his singing "Kill the boer", as well as another struggle song called "Biza a ma'firebrigate". In the years between the two cases, the Constitutional Court had made significant bounds in its jurisprudence on hate speech, superseding the 2011 judgment. In November 2022, the court dismissed Afriforum's complaint, finding that Malema's singing the song did not constitute hate speech. The court accepted Malema's argument that the lyrics should not be interpreted literally but in their proper historical context as a statement of resistance to land dispossession.

=== Traffic offence arrest: December 2013 ===
In December 2013, Malema was arrested for allegedly speeding 215 km/h in a 120 km/h zone in his BMW along the N1 freeway near Vanderbijlpark, Gauteng. He was released on R5,000 bail. In February 2014, he was acquitted on a charge of reckless or negligent driving.

=== Hate speech conviction: August 2025 ===
On 27 August 2025, the Equality Court found Malema guilty of hate speech over remarks made in 2022. According to the court, Malema's comments included calls for the murder of a white man, which the court ruled to be "a clear attempt to promote hatred". The court said, "Whilst calling out someone who behaves as a racist may be acceptable, calling for them to be killed is not."

=== Discharge of a firearm in public: April 2026 ===
On 1 October 2025, Malema was found guilty by the East London Magistrates' Court on multiple charges arising from a 2018 incident in which he discharged a firearm during a rally at Sisa Dukashe Stadium in Mdantsane, Eastern Cape. The court convicted him under the Firearms Control Act of unlawful possession of a firearm and ammunition, discharging a firearm in a built-up or public area, and reckless endangerment. On 16 April 2026, he was sentenced to five years' imprisonment. He was granted leave to appeal, and remained free pending the outcome of further legal proceedings.

== Public image ==
A video presented by Donald Trump to Cyril Ramaphosa featuring Malema, May 2025 (Full video published by the White House YouTube account)

Widely regarded as a polarizing far-left figure, Malema is known for his oratorical skills. He is also known for his very controversial statements and has become a frequent target for lampooning. Initially, cartoonists Zapiro and Jeremy Nell often drew him dressed in nappies (diapers). Around 2010 Malema's public profile grew and he was described by critics in the media as a demagogue and a fascist.

Malema was listed in Time's Least Influential People of 2010, whereas conversely Forbes magazine named him as one of the "10 Youngest Power Men in Africa" in September 2011. Writing in the Sowetan, Andile Mngxitama described Malema as "an opportunist who raised these issues [nationalisation, land reform etc], not to solve them, but to trick the poor who have been waiting for a better life for all for almost 20 years now under your party's rule ... Instead of leading the new struggle as a selfless leader of the poor, you only pay lip service to the plight of our people while you amass great amounts of wealth through your political influence."

Between 2010 and 2013 popular media have referred to the Malema Dilemma to describe the duality between Malema's electoral popularity and the consequences of his controversial statements.

In May 2025, he was denied a visa by the United Kingdom which according to the British government was due to a bank holiday and short notice not giving time to process his application. Malema called the denial a "political attack"; Malema made disparaging remarks about the United Kingdom and its monarchy after the death of Elizabeth II. A month later, it was confirmed by the Home Office that Malema was banned from entering the United Kingdom, citing racist comments he had made. During a meeting in the Oval Office between Donald Trump and Cyril Ramaphosa, Trump played a video featuring some of Malema's controversial statements, to support Trump's claims of violence against white farmers in South Africa.

== Personal life ==
Malema married his long-time girlfriend in a private ceremony under heavy security in his hometown Seshego in 2014. Their first son Munzhedzi was born in 2016. Their second son Kopano was born in 2018. Malema also has a son named Ratanang from a previous relationship with Maropeng Ramohlale.
