= List of gay, lesbian or bisexual people: Sa–Sc =

This is a partial list of notable people who were or are gay men, lesbian or bisexual.

The historical concept and definition of sexual orientation varies and has changed greatly over time; for example the general term "gay" wasn't used to describe sexual orientation until the mid 20th century. A number of different classification schemes have been used to describe sexual orientation since the mid-19th century, and scholars have often defined the term "sexual orientation" in divergent ways. Indeed, several studies have found that much of the research about sexual orientation has failed to define the term at all, making it difficult to reconcile the results of different studies. However, most definitions include a psychological component (such as the direction of an individual's erotic desire) and/or a behavioural component (which focuses on the sex of the individual's sexual partner/s). Some prefer to simply follow an individual's self-definition or identity.

The high prevalence of people from the West on this list may be due to societal attitudes towards homosexuality. The Pew Research Center's 2013 Global Attitudes Survey found that there is “greater acceptance in more secular and affluent countries,” with "publics in 39 countries [having] broad acceptance of homosexuality in North America, the European Union, and much of Latin America, but equally widespread rejection in predominantly Muslim nations and in Africa, as well as in parts of Asia and in Russia. Opinion about the acceptability of homosexuality is divided in Israel, Poland and Bolivia.” As of 2013, Americans are divided – a majority (60 percent) believes homosexuality should be accepted, while 33 percent disagree.

== Sa–Sc ==
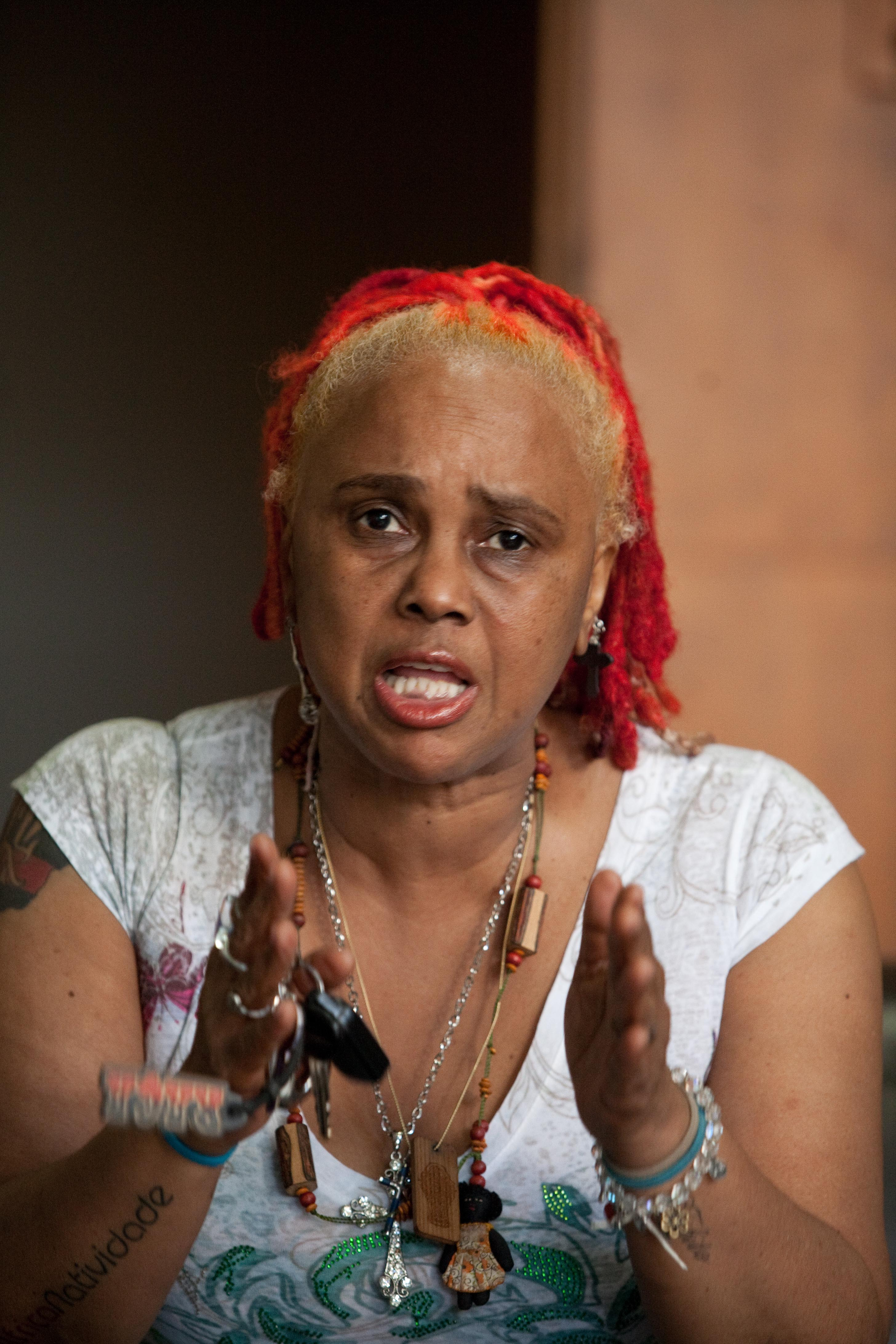
Singer-songwriter and instrumentalist Sandra de Sá

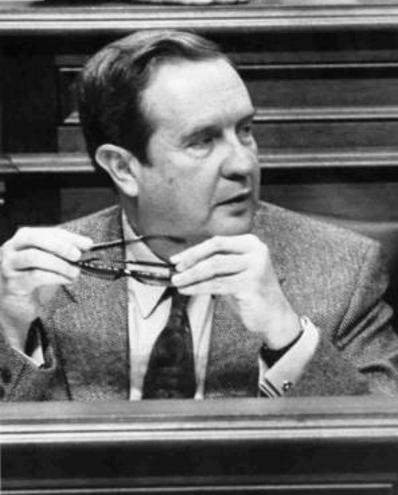
Academic, politician and two-term President of the Canary Islands Jerónimo Saavedra

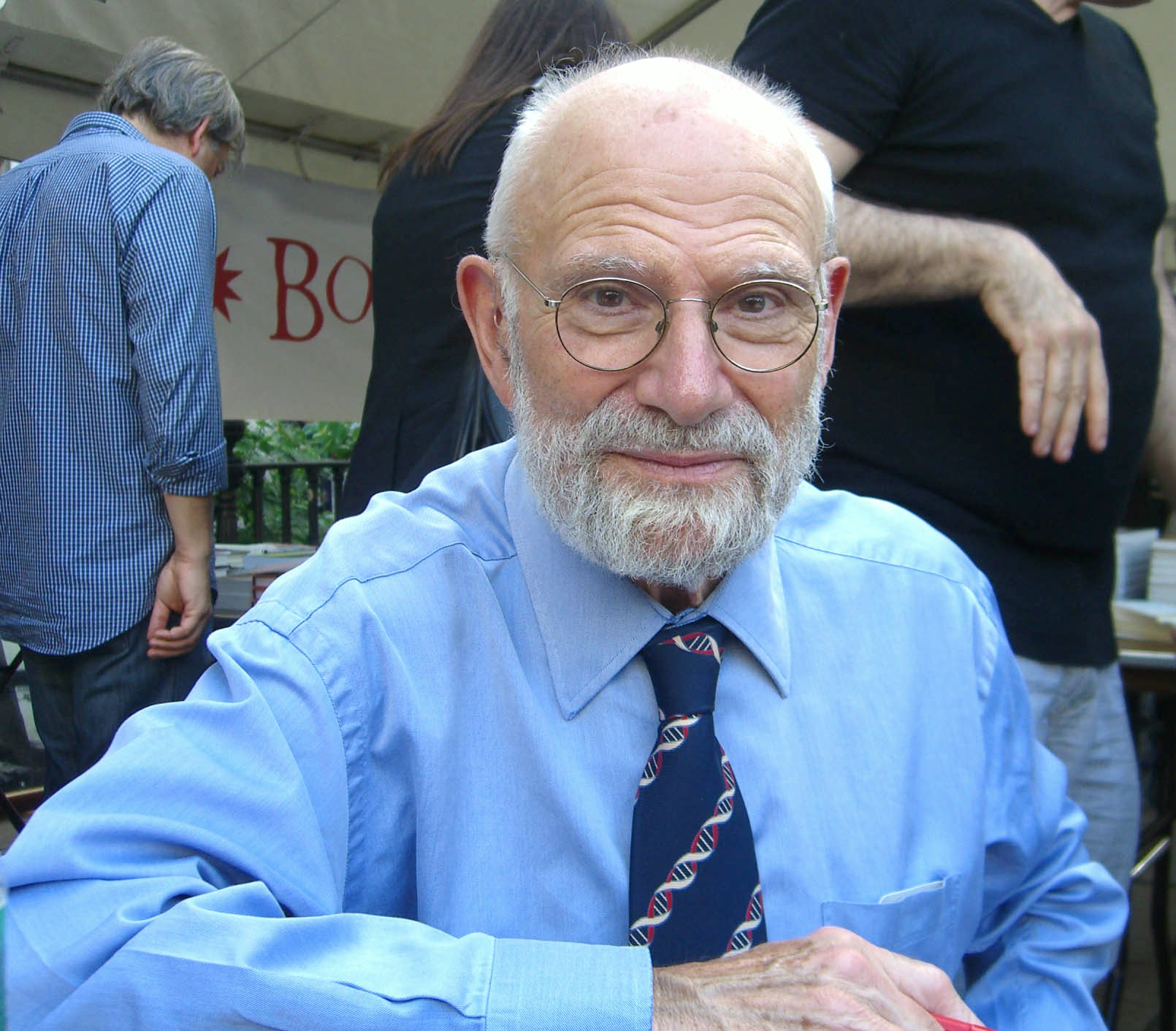
Neurologist, naturalist and author Oliver Sacks

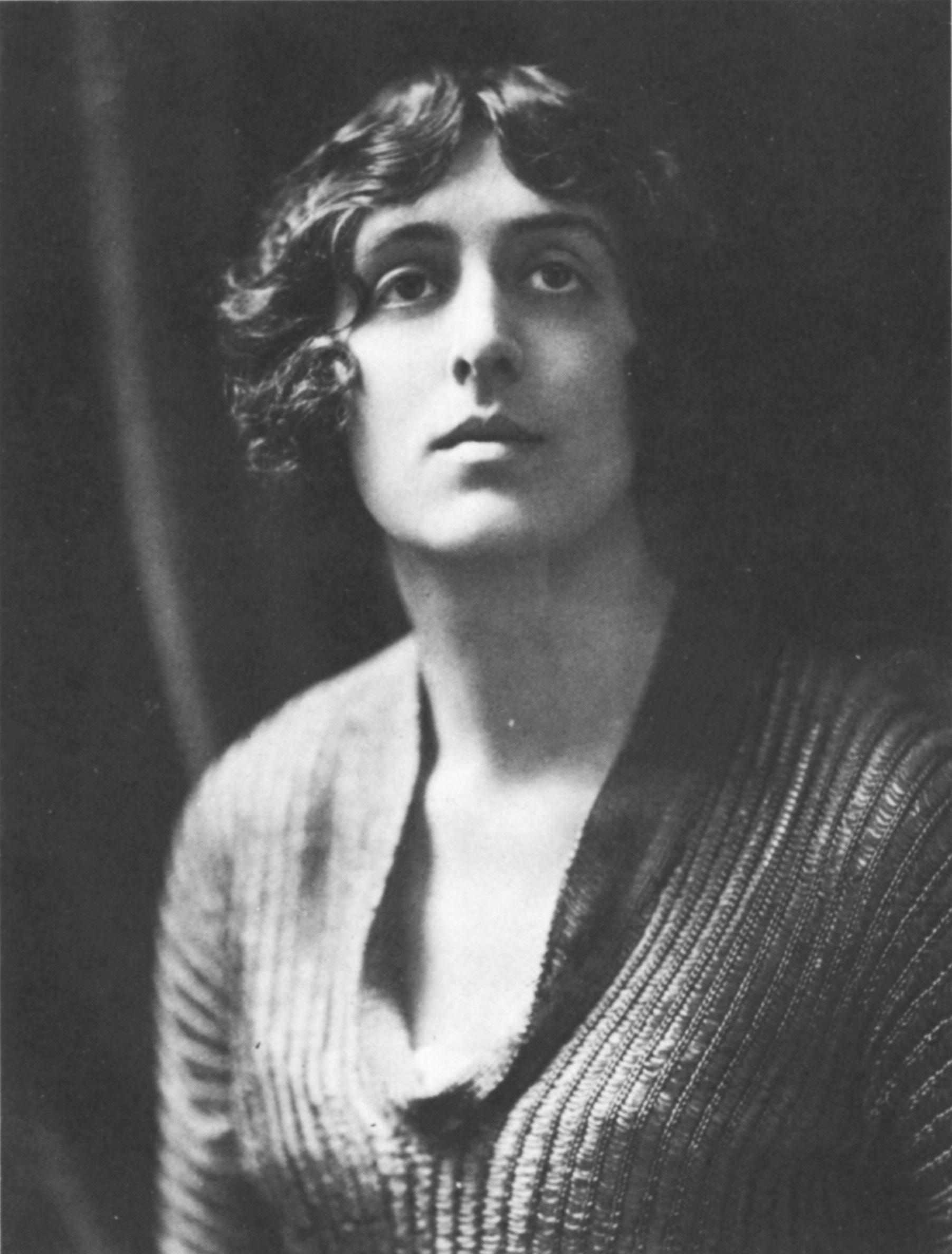
Writer and garden designer Vita Sackville-West

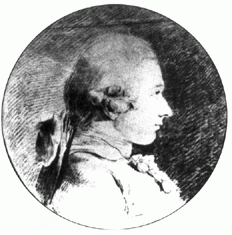
Writer Marquis de Sade

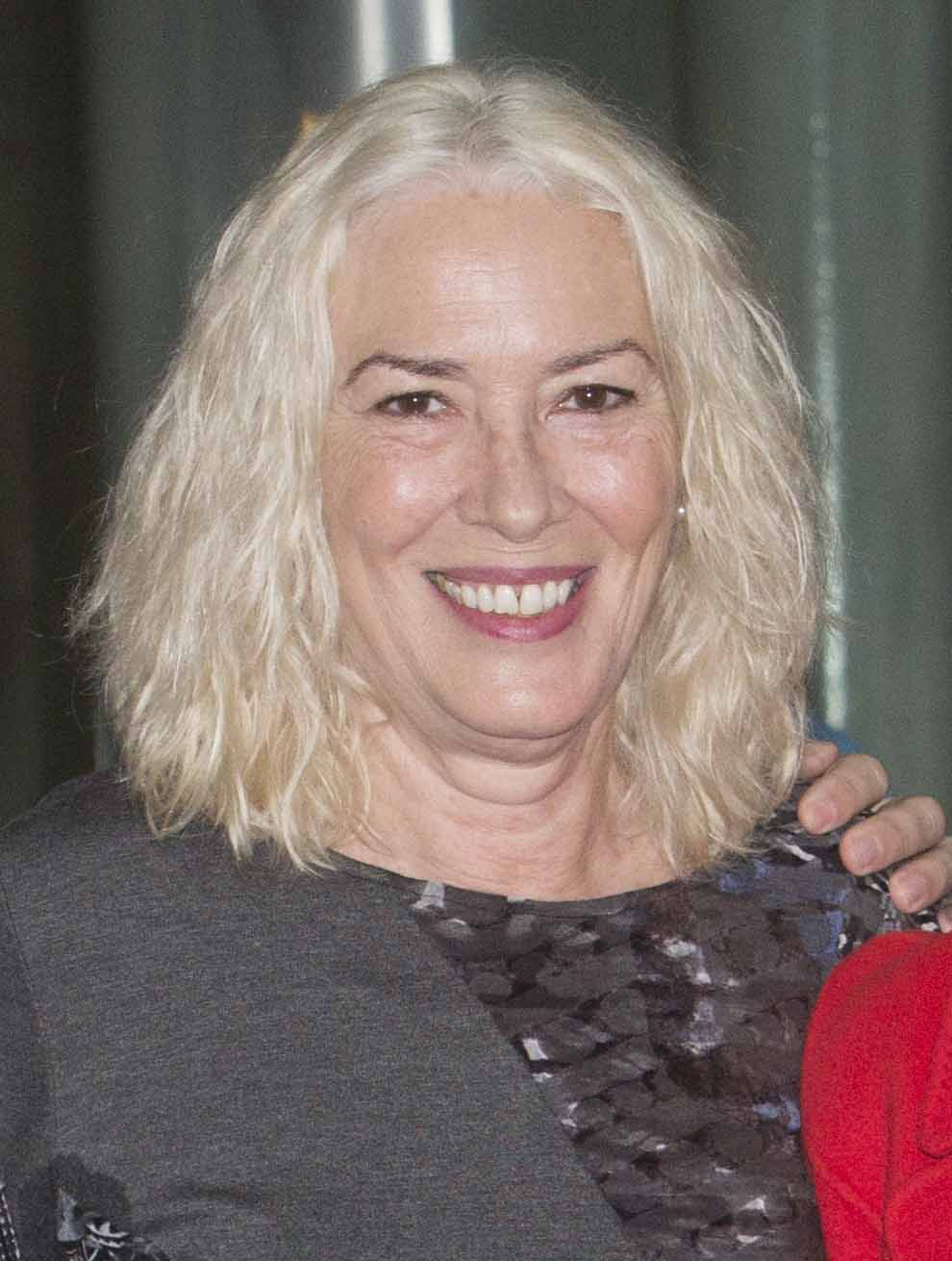
Actress Susi Sánchez

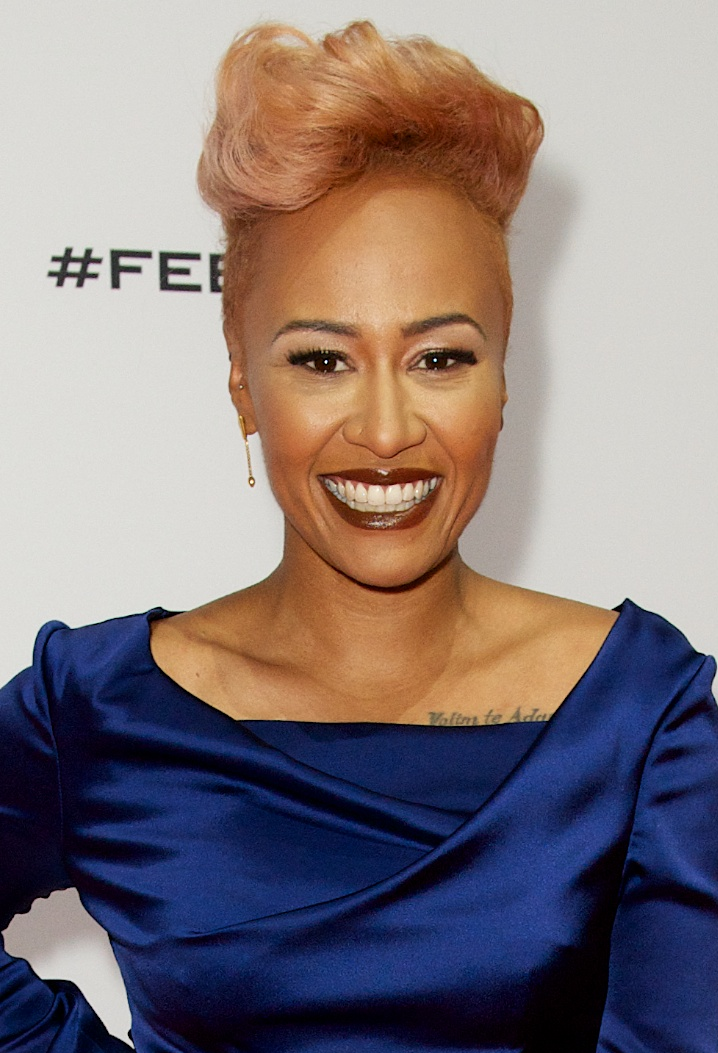
Singer Emeli Sandé

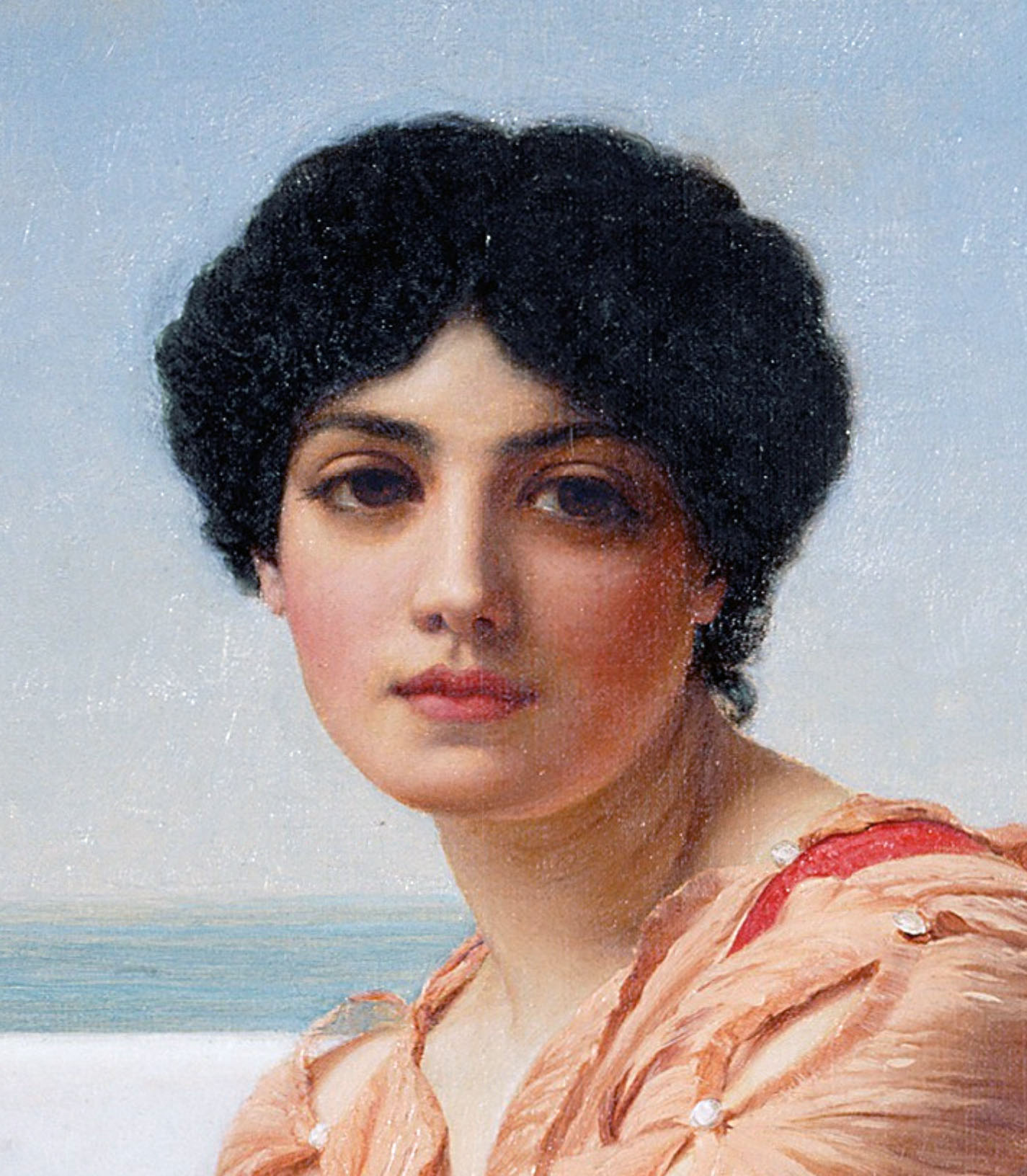
Poet Sappho

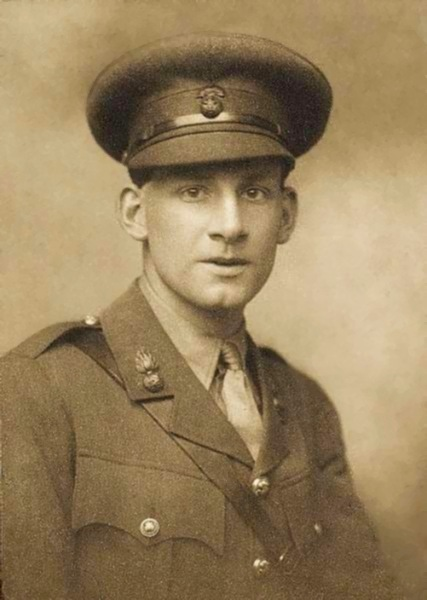
Poet, writer and soldier Siegfried Sassoon

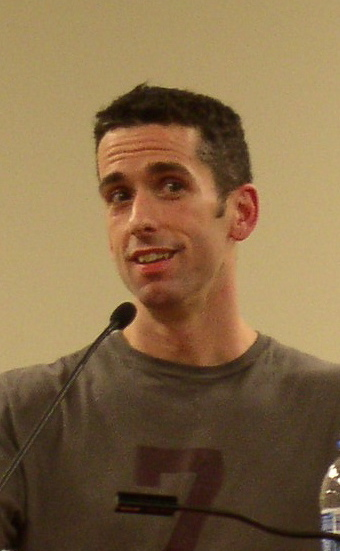
Writer Dan Savage

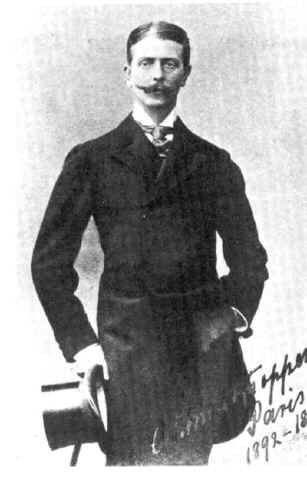
Military officer Maximilian von Schwartzkoppen

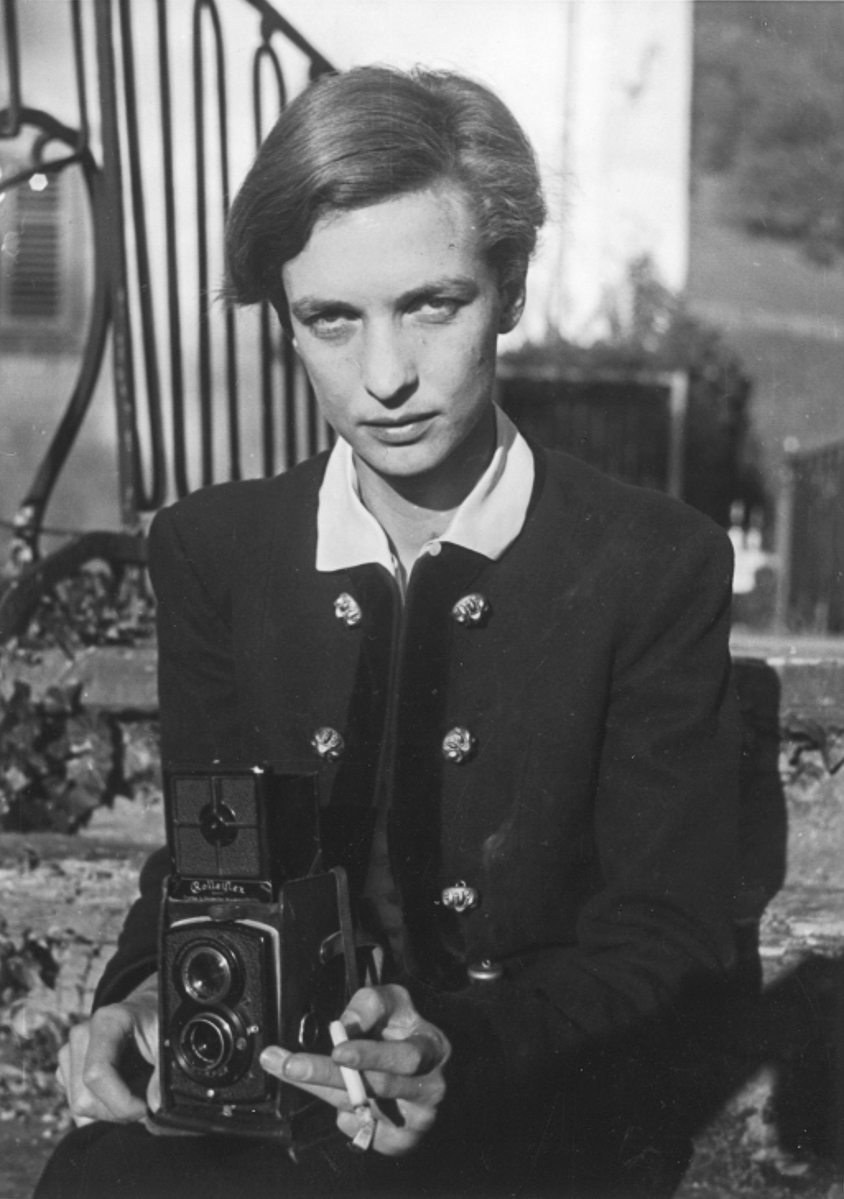
Photographer, writer and journalist Annemarie Schwarzenbach

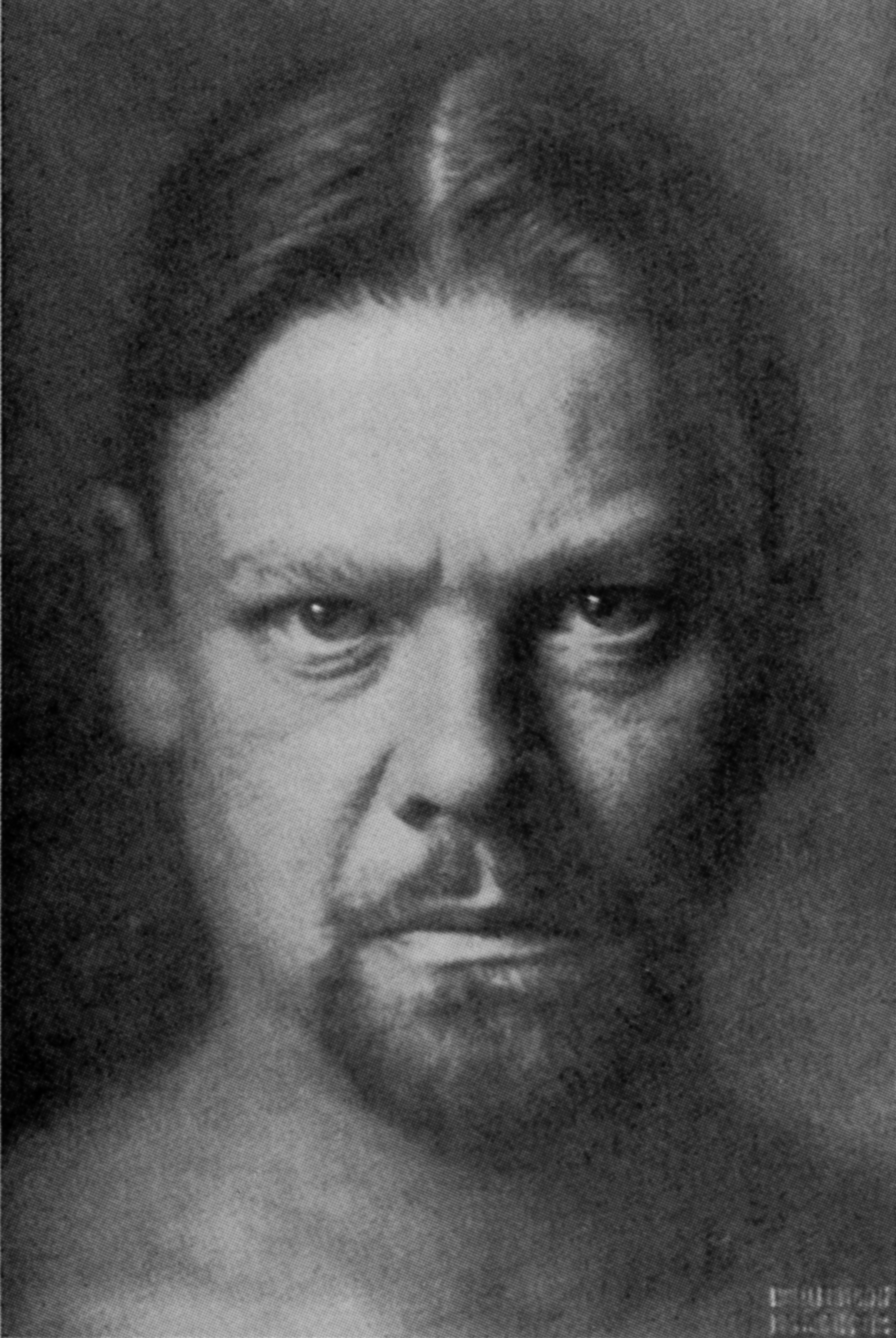
Painter and sculptor Sascha Schneider

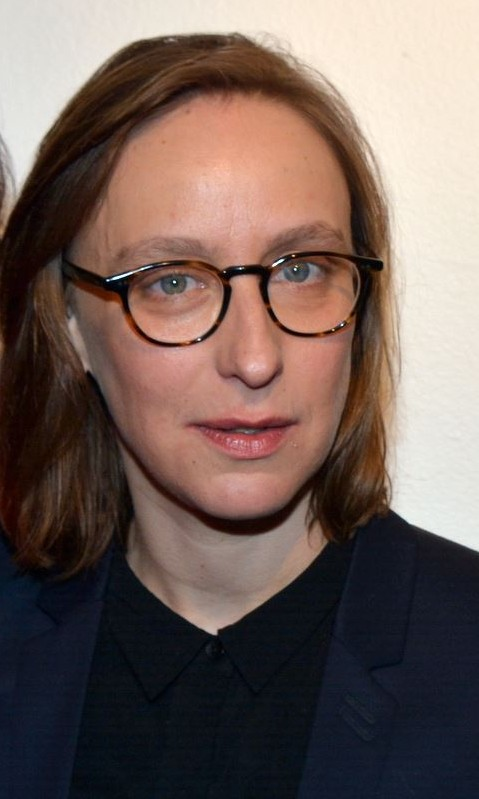
Director and screenwriter Céline Sciamma

Name	Lifetime	Nationality	Notable as	Notes
Luiza Sá	b. 1983	Brazilian	Rock musician (Cansei de Ser Sexy)	L
Sandra de Sá	b. 1955	Brazilian	Singer-songwriter, musician	B
Alfian Sa'at	b. 1977	Singaporean	Writer	G
Jorge Saavedra	b. ?	Mexican	AIDS activist	G
Jerónimo Saavedra	b. 1936	Canarian-Spanish	Politician, former President of the Canary Islands	G
Steven Sabados	b. ?	Canadian	Interior designer, talk show host	G
Diane Sabin	b. 1952	American	LGBT rights activist	L
Hamed Sabouri	1999/2000–2022	Afghan	Medical student, murder victim	G
Maher Sabry	b. 1967	Egyptian	Theatre director, playwright, film director, poet	G
Maurice Sachs	1906–1945	French	Writer	G
Oliver Sacks	1933–2015	English	Neurologist	G
Vita Sackville-West	1892–1962	English	Writer	B
Nemat Sadat	b. ?	Afghan-American	Journalist, novelist, human rights activist, professor	G
Marquis de Sade	1740–1814	French	Writer, philosopher	B
Fred Sadoff	1926–1994	American	Actor	G
Douglas Sadownick	b. ?	American	Writer	G
Witold Sadowy	b. 1920	Polish	Actor	G
Benjamin Alire Sáenz	1954–2026	American	Writer	G
Jaime Sáenz	1921–1986	Bolivian	Writer	B
Françoise Sagan	1935–2004	French	Playwright, novelist, screenwriter	L
Leontine Sagan	1889–1974	Austrian	Actor, theater director	L
Edward Sagarin (Donald Webster Cory)	1913–1986	American	Writer, professor of sociology and criminology	G
François Sagat	b. 1979	French	Pornographic actor	G
Ed Sahely	b. 1969	Canadian	Actor, comedian	G
Anwesh Sahoo	b. 1995	Indian	Writer, model, LGBT activist	G
Assotto Saint	1957–1994	Haitian-American	Poet, publisher, performance artist	G
James St. James	b. 1966	American	Club Kid, author	G
Keith St. John	b. 1957	American	Politician	G
Yves Saint Laurent	1936–2008	French	Fashion designer	G
Pirkko Saisio	b. 1949	Finnish	Author, actor, filmmaker	L
Sakima	b. ?	English	Singer	G
Dayshalee Salamán	b. 1990	Puerto Rican	Basketball player	L
George Salazar	b. 1986	American	Actor, singer, musician	G
Steve Salbu	b. ?	American	Academic administrator	G
Ali Saleem	b. 1979	Pakistani	TV personality	B
El Hedi ben Salem	1935–1977	Moroccan	Actor	B
Emily Saliers	b. 1963	American	Folk-rock musician (Indigo Girls)	L
Senni Salminen	b. 1996	Finnish	Triple jumper	L
Ola Salo	b. 1977	Swedish	Rock musician (The Ark)	B
Jacopo Saltarelli	1459–?	Italian	Model, prostitute	G
Mark Saltzman	b. ?	American	Dramatist, screenwriter	G
Victor Salva	b. 1958	American	Film director	G
Pablo Salvador	b. ?	Panamanian-Chilean	Gay activist and blogger	G
Ève Salvail	b. 1971	Canadian	Model	L
Josef Salvat	b. 1987	Australian	Singer-songwriter	B
Chris Salvatore	b. 1985	American	Actor, singer-songwriter, model, gay-rights activist	G
Manfred Salzgeber	1943–1994	German	Actor, film producer	G
Michael Sam	b. 1990	American	Football player	G
Mangala Samaraweera	b. 1956	Sri Lankan	Politician	G
Samo	b. 1975	Mexican	Pop singer-songwriter	G
Pedro Sampaio	b. 1997	Brazilian	Singer, music producer	B
Ryan Sampson	b. 1988	English	Actor	G
JD Samson	b. 1978	American	Musician (Le Tigre, MEN), producer, DJ	L
Pierre Samson	b. 1959	Canadian	Writer	G
Alex Sánchez	b. 1957	Mexican-American	Writer	G
Macarena Sánchez	b. 1991	Argentine	Footballer	L
Marcelino Sánchez	1957–1986	Puerto Rican	Actor	G
Susi Sánchez	b. 1955	Spanish	Actor	L
David Sánchez Camacho	b. 1963	Mexican	Politician	G
Lucía Sánchez Saornil	1895–1970	Spanish	Poet, militant anarchist, feminist	L
Jon Ola Sand	b. 1961	Norwegian	TV executive	G
Alek Sandar	b. 1987	Bulgarian	Pop singer	G
Emeli Sandé	b. 1987	British	Singer-songwriter	B
Victoria Sandell Svensson	b. 1977	Swedish	Footballer	L
Sue Sanders	b. 1947	English	LGBT rights activist	L
Lianne Sanderson	b. 1988	English	Footballer	L
Terry Sanderson	b. 1946	English	Writer, secularist, activist	G
Emanuel Sandhu	b. 1980	Canadian	Figure skater	G
Ramon Sandin	b. 1970	Puerto Rican	Diver, actor	G
Barry Sandler	b. 1947	American	Filmmaker	G
Luis Sandoval	b. 1980	Mexican	Reporter, actor, entertainer	G
Robert J. Sandoval	1950–2006	American	Judge	G
Helen Sandoz	1920–1987	American	Activist, writer	L
Diane Sands	b. 1947	American	Politician	L
Ethel Sands	1873–1962	American-British	Artist, hostess	L
Michael Sandy	1977–2006	American	Murder victim	G
Janusz Aleksander Sanguszko	1712–1775	Polish–Lithuanian	Court Marshal of Lithuania	G
Barbaros Şansal	b. 1957	Turkish	Fashion designer, human rights activist	G
Paolo Santalucia	b. ?	Canadian	Actor	G
Saucy Santana	b. 1993	American	Rapper	G
Mathilde Santing	b. 1958	Dutch	Singer	L
Ary dos Santos	1937–1984	Portuguese	Poet	G
George Santos	b. 1988	American	Politician	G
Jorge José Emiliano dos Santos	1954–1995	Brazilian	Football referee	G
Michael dos Santos	b. 1983	Brazilian	Volleyball player	G
Nick Santos	b. 1979	Filipino-American	Actor	G
Larry Saperstein	b. 1998	American	Actor	B
Sapphire	b. 1950	American	Writer, performance artist	L
Sappho	ca. 630–570 BCE	Greek	Poet	B
Chip Sarafin	b. ?	American	Football player	G
Susan Sarandon	b. 1946	American	Actor, activist	B
Severo Sarduy	1937–1993	Cuban	Poet, author, playwright, literary and art critic	G
Fred Sargeant	b. 1948	French-American	Gay rights activist	G
Dick Sargent	1930–1994	American	Actor	G
Frank Sargeson	1903–1982	New Zealand	Writer	G
Kaarlo Sarkia	1902–1945	Finnish	Poet, translator	G
Elizabeth Sarnoff	b. ?	American	Screenwriter	L
José Sarria	1922–2013	American	Performer; US's 1st openly gay public office candidate	G
May Sarton	1912–1995	Belgian-American	Writer	L
Sean Sasser	1968–2013	American	Educator, chef, TV personality	G
Siegfried Sassoon	1886–1967	English	Writer	G
Kathleen Satchwell	b. ?	South African	Judge	L
Tully Satre	b. 1989	American	Student, LGBT rights activist	G
Amy Satterthwaite	b. 1986	New Zealand	Cricketer	L
Rakesh Satyal	b. ?	American	Writer	G
Jack Saul	1857–1904	Irish	Prostitute, involved in both the Dublin Castle scandal and the Cleveland Street scandal	G
John Saul	b. 1942	American	Writer	G
Raven Saunders	b. 1996	American	Track and field athlete	L
Dan Savage	b. 1964	American	Columnist	G
Jon Savage	b. 1953	English	Writer	G
Savannah	1970–1994	American	Pornographic actor	B
Tessie Savelkouls	b. 1992	Dutch	Judoka	L
Ed Savitz	1942–1993	American	Criminal	G
Matthew Savoie	b. 1980	American	Attorney, figure skater	G
Rina Sawayama	b. 1990	Japanese-British	Singer, actress	B
Marjan Sax	b. 1947	Dutch	Feminist activist	L
Lorne Saxberg	1958–2006	Canadian	Journalist	G
Steven Saylor	b. 1956	American	Writer	G
Arnold Scaasi	1930–2015	Canadian	Fashion designer	G
John Scagliotti	b. ?	American	Film director	G
Ivan Scalfarotto	b. 1965	Italian	Politician, LGBT activist	G
Dick Scanlan	b. 1961	American	Writer	G
Glenn Scarpelli	b. 1966	American	Actor	G
Francesco Scavullo	1921–2004	American	Photographer	G
Sue Schafer	b. ?	American	Politician	L
Carsten Schatz	b. 1970	German	Historian, politician	G
Toer van Schayk	b. 1936	Dutch	Ballet dancer, choreographer, designer, artist	G
Will Scheffer	b. ?	American	Screenwriter, TV producer	G
Kate Schellenbach	b. 1966	American	Rock musician (Luscious Jackson), TV producer	L
Patty Schemel	b. 1967	American	Rock musician (Hole)	L
Christian Scheuß	b. 1966	German	Writer	G
Tine Scheuer-Larsen	b. 1966	Danish	Tennis player	L
Clemens Schick	b. 1972	German	Actor, model, political activist, human rights advocate	G
Gerhard Schick	b. 1972	German	Politician	G
Dieter Schidor	1948–1987	German	Actor	G
Taylor Schilling	b. 1984	American	Actor	B
Allen R. Schindler Jr.	1969–1992	American	Sailor, murder victim	G
Thomas Schippers	1930–1977	American	Composer, conductor	G
Käthe Schirmacher	1865–1930	German	Politician, women's rights activist, writer, journalist	L
Richard L. Schlegel	1927–2006	American	Gay rights activist, writer, civil servant	G
Christina Schlesinger	b. 1946	American	Painter	L
John Schlesinger	1926–2003	English	Film director	G
Gregor Schmidinger	b. 1985	Austrian	Screenwriter, film director	G
Viktoria Schnaderbeck	b. 1991	Austrian	Footballer	L
Noah Schnapp	b. 2004	American	Actor	G
Tobias Schneebaum	1922–2005	American	Artist	G
Etienne Schneider	b. 1971	Luxembourgish	Deputy Prime Minister of Luxembourg, economist	G
Fred Schneider	b. 1951	American	Rock musician (The B-52's)	G
Maria Schneider	1952–2011	French	Actor	B
Sascha Schneider	1870–1927	German	Painter, sculptor	G
Jane Schoenbrun	b. 1987	American	Filmmaker	L
Phillip Schofield	b. 1962	English	TV presenter	G
Aaron Schock	b. 1981	American	Politician	G
Axel Schock	b. 1965	German	Journalist, author	G
Hans Scholl	1918–1943	German	Pacifist, White Rose German resistance member	B
Frank Scholten	1881–1942	Dutch	Photographer, author	G
Claudia Schoppmann	b. 1958	German	Historian, writer	L
Collier Schorr	b. 1963	American	Photographer	L
Rand Schrader	1945–1993	American	Activist and judge	G
Ariel Schrag	b. 1979	American	Cartoonist	L
Felice Schragenheim	1922–1944	German	WWII resistance fighter	L
Ed Schrock	b. 1941	American	Politician	G
Werner Schroeter	1945–2010	German	Film director, opera director	G
Jochen Schropp	b. 1978	German	Actor, TV presenter	G
Daniel Schuhmacher	b. 1987	German	Pop singer-songwriter	G
Sarah Schulman	b. 1958	American	Writer, activist	L
Joel Schumacher	1939–2020	American	Filmmaker	G
Ralf Schumacher	b. 1975	German	Racing driver	G
Eugenie Schumann	1851–1938	German	Pianist, author	L
Jannik Schümann	b. 1992	German	Actor	G
Megan Schutt	b. 1993	Australian	Cricketer	L
Demi Schuurs	b. 1993	Dutch	Tennis player	L
James Schuyler	1923–1991	American	Poet	G
Will Schwalbe	b. 1962	American	Author, entrepreneur, journalist	G
Maximilian von Schwartzkoppen	1850–1917	Prussian	Military officer	G
Jaecki Schwarz	b. 1946	German	Actor	G
Annemarie Schwarzenbach	1908–1942	Swiss	Photographer	L
Alice Schwarzer	b. 1942	German	Journalist, feminist	L
Klaus Schwarzkopf	1922–1991	German	Actor	G
Jean Baptista von Schweitzer	1833–1875	German	Politician, playwright	G
Benji Schwimmer	b. 1984	American	Dancer, choreographer	G
Scialpi	b. 1962	Italian	Pop singer	G
Céline Sciamma	b. 1978	French	Director, screenwriter	L
Carl Sciortino	b. 1978	American	Politician	G
Sandra Scoppettone	b. 1936	American	Writer	L
Ernesto Scorsone	b. 1952	American	Politician	G
Andrew Scott	b. 1976	Irish	Actor	G
Ann Scott	b. 1965	French	Writer	B
Calum Scott	b. 1988	English	Singer-songwriter	G
Craig Scott	b. 1962	Canadian	Politician	G
Dale Scott	b. 1959	American	Baseball umpire	G
Daniel Scott	b. ?	Australian	Actor	G
Daniel Scott	b. 1963	American	Writer	G
Gail Scott	b. 1945	Canadian	Writer	L
Hillary Scott	b. 1983	American	Pornographic actor	B
Ian Scott	1934–2006	Canadian	Attorney General of Ontario	G
John Maurice Scott	1934–2006	Fijian	Red Cross Director, murder victim	G
Melissa Scott	b. 1960	American	Writer	L
Patrick Scott	1921–2014	Irish	Artist	G
C. K. Scott Moncrieff	1889–1930	Scottish	Writer, translator	G
James Scully	b. 1992	American	Actor	G

== See also ==
- List of gay, lesbian or bisexual people
