= InkuluFreeHeid =

- Abbreviation: IFH
- Predecessor: None
- Formation: 19 February 2013; 13 years ago
- Type: Nonprofit, Nonpartisan
- Headquarters: Johannesburg
- Location(s): Johannesburg; Port Elizabeth; Cape Town; Durban; Tshwane; Vaal Triangle
- Region served: South Africa
- President: Ms Lindelwe Dube
- National Coordinator: Lindelwe Dube
- Finance Director: Matthew Low
- Key people: Kgotsi Chikane Rehana Odendaal Mohato Madibo Olwam Mnqwazi Frederik Thomas de Ridder Sizwe Mpofu-Walsh
- Affiliations: None
- Volunteers: 50+
- Website: inkulufreeheid.net

There is a growing List of social movements in South Africa, amongst these is the youth-led non-partisan InkuluFreeHeid Organisation. The majority of social movements have a particular focus on the housing crisis in urban area while others range from focusing on HIV/AIDS, working conditions, unemployment, access to service delivery and issues of democracy, transparency and accountability.

InkuluFreeHeid launched in February 2013 and aims to unite South Africans, particularly young people, behind efforts that help solve major economic challenges, deepen democracy and enhance social cohesion.

According to South Africa former Minister of Finance and Minister in the Presidency Trevor Manuel, the InkuluFreeHeid movement is a 'youth-led non-party affiliated movement that mobilises against political apathy among young people in South Africa.'.

== Background ==
Since launching in early 2013, representatives of the organisation have supported critical debate and action on issues of national importance, including the need for South Africa to create a "unifying identity", the importance of indigenous languages amongst the youth, the National Development Plan 2030, the Marikana miners' strike, and the youth-vote in the 2014 National General Elections, as well as speaking out against the abuse of women and children.

== Recognition ==
InkuluFreeHeid featured in Vanity Fair magazine in March 2014, was selected by Global Poverty Project's 'Global Citizen' in July 2014 as one of three global movements driving change and was named by Primedia Broadcasting's Lead SA as one of its top 15 causes to support and champion in 2015. In 2013, InkuluFreeHeid co-founder, Sizwe Mpofu-Walsh was recognised as one of the Mail & Guardian's 'Top 200 Young South Africans'. On 1 April 2015, InkuluFreeHeid President, Kgotsi Chikane was recognised by leading pop-culture magazine Mahala as one of '10 young South Africans leading the way to making change in South Africa'.

== National Democratic Convention 2015 ==
In September 2014, InkuluFreeHeid announced that it will host its Inaugural National Democratic Convention in early 2015. The National Democratic Convention took place 10/11 January 2015 and resolved a new Programme of Action to define the future work and policies of the organisation.

== #FeesMustFall ==
InkuluFreeHeid remains in support of the call for a "decommodified, Afrocentric education system", according to a recent interview of newly elected President Lindelwe Dube in VICE NEWS.

== Affiliated past nonpartisan campaigns ==
=== National Youth Engagement ===
"I want to say to those involved in the National Youth Engagement initiative that there is so much that I encounter so frequently that is inspirational about what you do...but, part of what you'll need, is to shape the ideals that will hold you together, you need the kinds of ideals that will commit you to action, the kinds of ideals against which you can measure your own progress arising from this engagement.."

— Manuel, 2013

National Youth Engagement on National Development Plan 2030, brought together 35 national youth organisations in Johannesburg on 1 June 2013, including political parties and youth representatives from different labour unions. The Engagement advocates for critical youth-led engagement, action and debate around issues of national planning and for the role of young people in national development. The National Youth Engagement was facilitated NPC Commissioner Mohammad Karaan and "resolved to assist in making the long NDP document more accessible to young people. "Moreover, the Engagement resolved to create a "dashboard" to monitor implementation of youth related proposals in the plan and hold government and business accountable and to meet annually to track progress on implementation." The Port Elizabeth NPC Youth Engagement, born of the National Youth Engagement, took place in New Brighton on 5 October 2013, facilitated by Minister Trevor Manuel, brought together youth organisations from across the Eastern Cape to engage on the National Development Plan.

=== Our Vote Our Voice ===
Our Vote Our Voice Campaign 2013-2014: was a grassroots democracy and soapbox campaign aimed at getting young people critically engaged in the 2014 National General Election, which drew support from all major political parties contending the 2014 National General Election.

=== Citizens4Marikana ===
"The request for funding by the said attorneys was considered, but could not be granted, as the legal framework of the State Attorney Act and the Commissions Act do not provide for legal representation for witnesses who are not in the employ of the State when the incidents or events being investigated, happened."

— Radebe, 2013

Citizens4Marikana Campaign: was a 2013 media campaign highlighting inequality-of-arms with respect to legal representation for victims at Marikana Commission of Inquiry appointed by President Jacob Zuma in 2012, advocating that the truth surrounding events in Marikana during the month of August in 2012 should be uncovered, that justice should be done and that adequate reparations must be made to the families of the victims on all sides of the conflict. Citizens4Marikana led a non-partisan march attended by thousands of citizens to the Union Buildings in September 2013. The campaign, in partnership with a number of stakeholders, created a platform for the public to help push a precedent-setting case in the High Court of South Africa regarding mandated State funding for poor individuals at future Presidential Commissions of Inquiry. The campaign wound-down in early 2014 following the victory in the High Court, and is no longer active.

"The judgment is also significant in recognising that the Constitution guarantees the right to state-funded legal assistance in some civil proceedings and commissioner of inquiry, where the circumstances require legal representation in order to secure a fair hearing."

— Legal Resources Centre, 2013

== Role in 2014 National General Elections ==
InkuluFreeHeid contributed to the Electoral Institute of South Africa '2014 Elections Update'. In April 2014, Frederik Thomas de Ridder briefed the Southern African Development Community Election Observer Mission in Pretoria on "Youth and elections in South Africa", and the African Union Election Observer Mission in Johannesburg. On 22 April, speaking at an event in Port Elizabeth organised by InkuluFreeHeid, the "Former National Director of Public Prosecutions, Vusi Pikoli, [was] the latest to disagree with former intelligence minister Ronnie Kasrils' notion that South Africans should spoil their vote in the May 7th election." On 30 April, InkuluFreeHeid in association with ANN7 hosted "The Real Debate" between the top three political parties campaigning in the Gauteng region (according to Ipsos polls) at Liliesleaf, Johannesburg. The Real Debate featured Dali Mpofu, Mmusi Maimane and David Makhura. On 20 May, following "The Real Debate", Mr David Makhura, African National Congress Gauteng Secretary, was "confirmed as the Premier of the country’s biggest economy, Gauteng."

== "Mr President" hip-hop track released by co-founder (music) ==
"Twenty years ago, baba uZuma was a liberator: he had survived a decade on Robben Island, put his life in danger serving the underground liberation movement and played a seminal role in the negotiations that secured the South African Constitution. But 20 years can change a man. Twenty years can change a movement. And 20 years on, the liberator has become a tyrant."

— Mpofu-Walsh, 2014 (City Press)

InkuluFreeHeid co-founder Sizwe Mpofu-Walsh released a hip-hop track in April 2014 criticising the President of South Africa, Jacob Zuma about his failings in dealing with the Marikana miners' strike, allegedly benefiting from state-funds in the upgrade of his homestead at Nkandla, and undermining women as well as undermining the African National Congress. The song also calls for Jacob Zuma to resign as the President of South Africa.

== Stellenbosch University Frederik Van Zyl Slabbert Institute Short Course (education) ==
An accredited short course about democracy and citizenship is hosted by the Frederik van Zyl Slabbert Institute for Student Leadership Development in collaboration with InkuluFreeHeid. The course was launched in 2013 and explores the concepts of democracy and citizenship in the context of South Africa and Africa. The theoretical elements of the course is complemented with a practical component. Participants are encouraged to engage as active citizens in democratic processes in local communities and to acknowledge accountability for their continuous role in the development and democratisation of South Africa.

== Engagement with Lead South Africa ==
On 20 September 2014, InkuluFreeHeid's Kgotsi Chikane 'took over' Primedia Broadcasting's LeadSA social-media accounts for 24-hours, as part of their 'future leader' series.

== Engagement with Kofi Annan ==
In July 2013, InkuluFreeHeid co-founders Sizwe Mpofu-Walsh and Frederik Thomas de Ridder participated in the Kofi Annan Live Dialogue on Democracy and Elections, "an unprecedented series of online discussion" with the 7th Secretary General of the United Nations organised by the Kofi Annan Foundation to 'inspire young people to lead'.

== Support of global Peace One Day Campaign ==
On 21 September 2013, InkuluFreeHeid organised the Live Global Moment from South Africa with Peace One Day and the Ahmed Kathrada Foundation to mark the 50th anniversary of the Rivonia trials that led to the incarceration of Nelson Mandela and Ahmed Kathrada. Peace One Day, is a non-profit organisation whose objective is to institutionalise Peace Day 21 September. According to an independent McKinsey & Company Report, 470 million people in 200 countries across the world were aware of Peace Day 2013. The Live Global Moment was broadcast live from Liliesleaf Farm in Rivonia, Johannesburg, reaching an estimated global audience of 18-million, and featuring a panel that included Ahmed Kathrada, Justice Yvonne Mokgoro, Kay Sexwale, Archbishop Thabo Makgoba, Sizwe Mpofu-Walsh and Frederik Thomas de Ridder.

== Relationship with One Young World global movement ==
In October 2013, InkuluFreeHeid co-founders presented at the One Young World Summit in Johannesburg, South Africa. Following a presentation at the Summit, Bob Geldof described InkuluFreeHeid as "being a threat without violence", while Kofi Annan "emphasised that it takes individual and group efforts to make this kind of change."

== Technical and Web Development ==
Tokelo David Matlou is the 'Chief Technology Officer' of the organisation.

== Leadership ==
2016-2017 National Executive Team

- President - Ms Lindelwe Dube
- National Coordinator - Ms Sesethu Gqomo
- Finance Director - Mr Matthew Louw

2015-2016 National Executive Team

- President - Mr Kgotsi Chikane
- Deputy President - Mr Sizwe Mpofu-Walsh
- Chairperson - Ms Rehana Odendaal
- National Coordinator - Ms Lindelwe Dube
- Member - Mr Erik de Ridder
- Treasure - Mr Velani Mboweni

2015-2016 National Working Group

- Chairperson - Ms Rehana Odendaal
- National Coordinator - Ms Lindelwe Dube
- Member - Mr Thabo Nonkenge
- Member - Mr Matthew Low
- Member - Ms Sesethu Gqomo
- Member - Mr Mohato Madibo
- Member - Ms Courtney du Plooy

2013-2014 Organisers

- Olwam Mnqwazi (Eastern Cape)
- Mhlanganisi Madlongolwana (North West)
- Ziyanda Kenya (Western Cape)
- Jolynn Minnaar (Western Cape)
- Anina Botha (Western Cape)
- Sizwe Mpofu-Walsh (Gauteng)
- Frederik de Ridder (Gauteng)
- Sesethu Gqomo (Eastern Cape)
- Saif Islam (Western Cape)
- Matthew de la Hey (Kwazulu-Natal)
- Thabo Nonkenge (Eastern Cape)
- Khwezi Kondile (Gauteng)
- Nombuso Ndlovu (Gauteng)
- Vivek Ramsaroop (Gauteng)
- Rehana Odendaal (Western Cape)
- Kgotsi Chikane (Western Cape)
- Loyiso Saliso (Eastern Cape)

== Support of notable leaders ==
- Joel Netshitenzhe - On 12 September 2013, former Head of Communication in President Nelson Mandela's cabinet and current director of the Think tank Mapungubwe Institute of Strategic and Cultural Reflection (MISTRA), Joel Netshitenzhe, identified the movement with the need for social and citizen activism and the important role of youth leadership in South Africa.
- Trevor Manuel - On 11 October 2013, former Minister of Finance and Minister in the Presidency in charge of the National Planning Commission, reflecting on the National Development Plan and the commitments made in the South African Constitution, referred to InkuluFreeHeid as a part of broader, society-wide action initiatives needed to realise the Plan and those commitments: "There are some initiatives that straddle government and non-government, I would include the Education Collaborative Partnership and the new initiatives on Early Childhood Development among these. We are also starting to see some initiatives outside of government - I include the InkuluFreeHeid Youth initiative among these - essentially the movement is non-party affiliated and mobilises against political apathy among young people. My submission is that we do not know nearly enough about these citizens movements and there clearly are not enough of them. I put it to you that we were able to cause the collapse of the apartheid regime by the strength of organised citizenry acting together".
