= Zan Times =

Afghan media in exile

Zan Times (زن‌تایمز)
- Website type: Online news
- Available in: English, Persian
- Headquarters: Edmonton, {{{location_country}}}
- Founder: Zahra Nader
- Website: zantimes.com
- Launched: August 2022; 4 years ago

Zan Times (Persian: زن‌تایمز) is an Afghan online publication focused on women and the LGBTQ+ community in Afghanistan. It was founded in August 2022 in Edmonton, Canada by journalist Zahra Nader, in response to the Taliban's return to power in 2021.

The word “Zan” means “women” in Persian, and Zan Times consists of a team of primarily women journalists reporting from exile or courageously on-site in Afghanistan. The publication focuses on human rights violations, particularly in the context of women's and LGBTQ rights.

== History ==
In 2021, Zahra Nader was a doctoral student at York University in Canada, and was intending to return to her native Afghanistan to continue her research. In August of that year, the Taliban regained control of Afghanistan and, with their brutal clampdown on the rights and freedoms of Afghan women, she relinquished her plans to return.

The interpretation of Sharia law practised by the Taliban increasingly restricts women to their homes, forbidding education and decimating employment options, and delivers extreme judgements against any identified as part of the LGBTQ+ community. In August, 2022, using her own funds and with a team of volunteers in exile, Ms. Nader founded the online publication Zan Times. The publication focuses on the ongoing deterioration of the rights of women and LGBTQ+ people in Afghanistan, and provides first-hand accounts of conditions in the country. Additionally, and despite funding being cut in January, 2025, Zan Times provides live seminars to women journalists in Afghanistan, ranging from writing and reporting skills to workshops on mental health and trauma.

Based in Ms. Nader's Edmonton home, Zan Times publishes in both English and Persian with the founder filling the role of editor-in-chief. By 2025, the team had grown to 10 employees outside of Afghanistan and many freelancers working secretly in the country. Due to the significant danger of discovery posed by the Taliban regime, on-site journalists in Afghanistan use pseudonyms to publish, and do not know each other. Only Ms. Nader and her collaborators know the real identities.

Funding for the Afghan journalists has been provided from Reporters without borders, International Women's Media Foundation, and Internews. The termination of US Aid in 2025 had a cascading negative impact on Zan Times revenue and individual donations have become the primary source for funds.

== Awards ==
In 2024, Zan Times was awarded the Human Rights Press Award of Human Rights Watch in the “Newsroom in Exile” category for coverage of a suicide pattern of Afghan women and girls under the Taliban regime. Also in 2024, the publication won the Palm-Foundation's Palm-Award for demonstrating "exceptional dedication to achieving freedom of speech and freedom of the press". On World Press Freedom Day in 2025, the publication won the Pen2Pen Freedom of Expression Award in recognition of its courageous journalism in documenting human rights abuses under Taliban rule.

== See also ==
- LGBTQ rights in Afghanistan
- Women in Afghanistan
