= LGBTQ rights in Afghanistan =

- Afghanistan
- Legal status: Illegal: Islamic law (sharīʿa) is applied (Islamic Emirate of Afghanistan)
- Penalty: Maximum penalty of death (Islamic Emirate of Afghanistan)
- Gender identity: No
- Military: No
- Discrimination protections: No

Family rights
- Recognition of relationships: No recognition of same-sex relationships
- Adoption: No

Lesbian, gay, bisexual, transgender, and queer (LGBTQ) people in the Islamic Emirate of Afghanistan face severe challenges not experienced by non-LGBTQ residents. Afghan members of the LGBTQ community are forced to keep their gender identity and sexual orientation secret, in fear of violence and the death penalty. The religious nature of the country has limited any opportunity for public discussion, with any mention of homosexuality and related terms deemed taboo.

On 23 January 2025, Prosecutor of the International Criminal Court, Karim Ahmad Khan, requested arrest warrants against Taliban leaders Hibatullah Akhundzada and Abdul Hakim Haqqani for their persecution of women, girls, and the LGBTQ community, marking the first time the court has recognized crimes against the LGBTQ community.

== Legality of same-sex sexual activity ==
=== Islamic Republic of Afghanistan ===
The Islamic Republic of Afghanistan (which governed most of Afghanistan's territory until 2021) was vague in regards to homosexuality laws; although not directly illegal, homosexuality could be punished by unofficial Sharia courts or by related crimes, such as extramarital sex.

==== Penal Code ====
The Penal Code of 1976 was reinstated after 2001, and it had several provisions that could have been applied to LGBTQ people. The Code specified that if crimes of zina did not qualify for hudud, the punishments prescribed therein could be administered based on a lower standard.

- Article 398 – Offers lesser punishment for vigilante honor killings, which may involve a family member discovering their spouse or kin engaging in adultery, fornication or homosexuality.
- Article 427 – Prescribes long prison terms for adultery and pederasty, the latter may be interpreted as including sodomy, in light of the fact that there are still legal punishments prescribed even if the people involved are legal adults. The maximum punishment increases if victim is under eighteen years of age, if the defendant is in a position of authority over the victim, if the defendant has repeatedly committed the crime or if the crime results in the spread of a disease. The law also increases the available punishment if a "violation of honor" takes place.
- Article 512 states that a person engaging in public "watching" in a repugnant manner shall be imprisoned or fined.

This Penal Code was replaced by the Penal Code of 2018, which explicitly criminalized same-sex relations.

==== Sharia law ====
The Constitution stipulated that Afghanistan is an Islamic republic, so it was possible for LGBTQ people in Afghanistan to be charged with violating Sharia law. This could have happened happen in lieu of, or in addition to charges being brought under the penal code. The Constitution of the Republic was more lenient than many hudud punishments, which were rarely enforced under the Islamic Republic.

Due to a lack of trust in federal institutions due to high rates of corruption, an estimated 80% of disputes are handled at the local level, in Jirga councils. Jirgas make decisions based on both traditional tribal law and Sharia law.

In the cities, persons convicted of homosexuality were generally sentenced to prison. In 2004, an American advisor to the Afghanistan government was arrested and sentenced to a prison sentence for homosexual activities with an Afghan man. Other news reports also noted that other men have been imprisoned for engaging in such same-sex sexual behavior.

=== Islamic Emirate of Afghanistan ===
The Taliban took over Afghanistan in 2021 after the previous government collapsed. Under their rule, LGBTQ recognition is against Islamic (sharīʿa) law and homosexuals are to be punished by death. Unlike the previous republic government, the Taliban's state has openly, either directly or indirectly, killed LGBTQ members. Shortly before the takeover, one Taliban judge stated that homosexuality must be punished either by stoning or by bringing a wall down upon the offender.

Under its first rule in the 1990s the group criminalized all sexual relationships outside of the heterosexual marriage, and would often publicly execute men and women for committing fornication and adultery and for engaging in sodomy. Gay men were the victim of honor killings by family members. The Taliban also killed gay men by having those accused of homosexual acts be placed into a pit and have a stone wall fall on them. In 1994, the Taliban supreme leader, Mullah Omar, saved a boy from being sodomized by two feuding generals in Kandahar and when he was subsequently given control of the city he decreed that both violent and mutually consensual sodomy would be capital crimes.

A 2017 law made homosexuality illegal in Afghanistan for both women and men.

The Afghan LGBT Organization is an NGO that tracks the rights of LGBTQ people in Afghanistan.

== Recognition of same-sex relationships ==
=== Islamic Republic of Afghanistan ===
The Afghanistan Law of Marriages (1971) stipulated that a legal marriage must be between two Muslim adults of the opposite sex, and that it must meet the rules of Islamic law. While the law did not explicitly address the issue of same-sex couples, Article 41 of the Marriage Law stipulated that where the law was silent on a particular issue, it was to be decided based on the principles of Islamic law. Hence, Afghanistan family law did not recognize same-sex marriages, civil unions or domestic partnerships. Likewise, the Afghanistan Law on Marriages, Weddings and Circumcision (1949) spoke of marriage as something between a Muslim man and woman and stated that marriages must follow Islamic law.

Article 430 stated that it shall be treated as "Instigation of Delinquency" if an adult promotes or assists in the act of minors (under 18) being involved in the act of adultery, homosexuality or prostitution.

=== Islamic Emirate of Afghanistan ===
Same-sex relationships and marriages are not recognized under the Taliban government.

== Discrimination and harassment ==
=== Attacks on gay men ===
Gay men have reportedly been lured to their deaths both by the Taliban government and the Islamic Republic of Afghanistan: according to activists, national security officials would make fake profiles on social media sites and dupe them into meeting them, often killing and raping them. In 2021, the Taliban lured a gay man in Kabul into meeting them using social media, and proceeded to rape and beat him. In 2022, the Taliban tortured and killed Hamed Sabouri, a 22-year-old gay medical student in Kabul.

There have been reports of kidnappings, beatings, killings, and gang rapes against members of the LGBTQ community under the post-2021 government.

=== Discrimination protections ===
==== Islamic Republic of Afghanistan ====
No law existed in Afghanistan to address discrimination or harassment on the basis of sexual orientation or gender identity. In response to foreign inquiries, the Afghan Social Democratic Party stated that it "favored an international effort to fight the AIDS-HIV pandemic, but that homosexuality and same-sex marriages are opposed by all great religions." No political party or interest group expressed support for LGBTQ rights.

Afghanistan law prohibited a political party, interest group or social club from advocating anything that is in opposition to Islamic morality. Absent a change in the law, it was unlikely that a political or social organization advocating LGBTQ rights would be permitted to exist and promote its viewpoints.

Islamic Emirate of Afghanistan

No protections exist for LGBTQ people in Afghanistan under Taliban rule.

== Social attitudes ==
Afghanistan's population is over 99% Muslim, and the country's Constitution stipulates that Islam shall be the official religion.

When publicly discussed, homosexuality is often linked with prostitution and pedophilia and the level of awareness about sexual orientation or gender identity is limited. In 2011, Afghan news reporters interviewed men who had LGBTQ-pride symbols on their vehicles, to find out that the men were unaware of the meaning of the rainbow flags and stickers, thinking that it was just another western fad, and began quickly removing the rainbows to avoid being seen as an LGBTQ people or supporters of LGBTQ rights.

The US Marine Corps' handbook for Operational Culture for Deploying Personnel from May 2009 stated that "homosexual behavior is relatively common, but taboo, in rural Afghanistan, because there are no other outlets for normal sexual energies. [sic]"

In 2009, Afghan author Hamid Zaher published a memoir, It Is Your Enemy Who is Dock-Tailed, about his experience as a gay man growing up in and later fleeing Afghanistan. The book was released in English in 2012 under the title Overcoming: Alone Against the World.

In 2012, Nemat Sadat, a human rights activist and former professor of political science at the American University of Afghanistan, mobilized an LGBTQ movement and on August 22, 2013, he became one of the first public figures to come out as gay and campaign for LGBTQ rights, gender freedom, and sexual liberation. Sadat is considered to have broken the taboos on cross-dressing and homosexuality in Afghanistan.

While gay Afghans may have been assaulted by certain state officers, the government at the time was not actively persecuting the community, and gay people could openly socialize in safe places. This situation changed after the Taliban takeover of the country in August 2021; CNN began corresponding with a 32-year-old gay, Christian, Hazara man who was then hiding in a house's basement in Kabul with his younger brother to avoid capture by the Taliban. CNN confirmed the man's identity through human rights activists. The man, whom CNN named "Ahmed" for his safety, was seeking ways to escape the country.

A survey revealed that the lives of LGBTQ people in Afghanistan have “dramatically worsened” under Taliban rule. The report by Human Rights Watch recorded nearly 60 cases of targeted violence against LGBTQ people, which highlighted cases of violence, gang-rape and death threats.

=== Homosexual practices with boys ===
Militia members generally do not have access to women, so boys are sometimes kidnapped to be humiliated and raped by adult men. Other boys become prostitutes for adult men, regardless of their sexual orientation.

These men involved are sometimes called bacha bazi in Persian and seem to flourish in the big cities of Afghanistan, possibly due to poverty and the strict social taboos surrounding interaction between men and women. A law has been enacted prohibiting Afghan soldiers from having their "ashna" (lit. "friend") live with them.

After the Taliban came to power in 1996, bacha bazi was banned along with homosexuality, both carrying the death penalty. The young victims were often charged rather than the perpetrators under the Islamic Republic of Afghanistan.

In 2007, reports stated that the practice of bacha bazi is still prevalent in parts of northern Afghanistan. This practice involves teenage boys being dressed in women's clothing and made to participate in dance competitions and engage in sexual acts. US-backed Northern Alliance warlords have been notorious for kidnapping trafficking and raping young boys ever since the fall of the Taliban regime, using the pretext of bacha bazi, even though they bear little resemblance to the historical practice. Neither the U.S. Department of Defense nor the Afghan government took action against these crimes, despite being aware of these practices. While President Hamid Karzai signed an agreement to ban bacha bazi, it was rarely enforced and police officers were reportedly complicit in related crimes.

=== HIV-AIDS ===
Prior to 2003, little or no HIV-AIDS education or treatment existed. As of 2008, the official number of people living with HIV-AIDS is 504, although the actual number is suspected of being higher, possibly in the thousands. Low literacy rates, weak infrastructure and traditional social mores make it difficult to introduce comprehensive public health education initiatives.

Thus far, the bulk of the available resources have focused on fighting drug addiction and, to a lesser extent, the commercial sex industry. Yet, what little is reportedly being said about sexuality is in the promotion of abstinence-only sex education programs.

In 2009, the first HIV-AIDS treatment center opened up in Kabul, with more clinics promised to open soon. Access to anti-retroviral drugs is, at best, limited and preventive initiatives often conflict with deep-rooted taboos. Efforts are being made to educate local and religious leaders in the hopes that they can legitimize greater public education.

Legally, Article 373 of the Afghanistan criminal code stipulated that a person that spreads a "dangerous disease" by accident shall be fined, but if the disease results in death or permanent disability the punishment shall be the same as if it were an accidental murder.

==== Censorship ====
Article 32 of the Afghanistan Press Law Edict (2002) prohibits publications from promoting "incitement to depravity". Likewise Article 27(D) of the Afghanistan Postal Law (1973) prohibits the usage of the postal service to exchange material that is "repugnant to public decency and morals." These two provisions could be used to censor the distribution of materials advocating LGBTQ rights or the general topic of sexual orientation and gender identity issues.

In 2009, an Afghan man named Hamid Zaher published his memoir titled, It Is Your Enemy Who Is Dock-Tailed. In the book, Zaher talks about growing up gay in Afghanistan, and how he eventually had to leave his country to avoid anti-gay discrimination. Because the memoir deals with homosexuality and is critical of homophobia, it cannot be distributed in Afghanistan itself, and Zaher's family has cut off all contact with him.

== Human rights reports ==
=== 2017 U.S. State Department report ===
In 2017, the U.S. State Department reported the following, concerning the status of LGBTQ rights in Afghanistan:

- "Discrimination against persons with disabilities and ethnic minorities and discrimination based on race, religion, gender, and sexual orientation persisted with little accountability."
- Acts of Violence, Discrimination, and Other Abuses Based on Sexual Orientation and Gender Identity
  "The law criminalizes consensual same-sex sexual conduct, and there were reports of harassment and violence by society and police. The law does not prohibit discrimination or harassment based on sexual orientation or gender identity. Homosexuality was widely seen as taboo and indecent. Members of the lesbian, gay, bisexual, transgender, and intersex (LGBTI) community did not have access to certain health services and could be fired from their jobs because of their sexual orientation. Organizations devoted to protecting the freedom of LGBTI persons remained underground because they could not legally register with the government. Members of the LGBTI community reported they continued to face discrimination, assault, rape, and arrest by security forces and society at large."

=== 2020 U.S. State Department report ===
In 2020, the U.S. State Department reported the following:

- LGBTI people "continued to face arrest by security forces" and also endured "discrimination, assault, and rape," including by police. As with the 2017 report, it remained the case that "homosexuality was widely seen as taboo and indecent" and that LGBTI rights organizations could not legally incorporate and therefore "remained underground." The government only permits condom distribution to married couples, and there is stigma against people living with HIV. Saboor Husaini, a transgender activist and artist, was murdered in December 2020.

== Summary table ==
Act	Legal
Same-sex sexual activity	No No (illegal, death penalty may be imposed)
Equal age of consent	No
Anti-discrimination laws in employment only	No
Anti-discrimination laws in the provision of goods and services	No
Anti-discrimination laws in all other areas (incl. indirect discrimination, hate speech)	No In Afghanistan, neither sexual orientation nor gender identity is a protected class from discrimination.
Same-sex marriages	No
Recognition of same-sex couples	No
Stepchild adoption by same-sex couples	No Adoption is prohibited for everyone in Afghanistan.
Joint adoption by same-sex couples	No
LGBTQ people allowed to serve openly in the military	No
Right to change legal gender	No Transgender individuals are unable to change their legal gender.
Conversion therapy made illegal	No Afghanistan does not ban conversion therapies that aim to change a person's sexual orientation or gender identity.
Access to IVF for lesbians	No
Commercial surrogacy for gay male couples	No
MSMs allowed to donate blood	No

== See also ==
- Human rights in Afghanistan
- LGBT rights in Asia
- Hamid Zaher - Afghan writer and gay activist
- Nemat Sadat
- Bobuq Sayed
- Capital punishment for homosexuality
- Capital punishment in Afghanistan
- LGBT people in Islam
- Women in Afghanistan
