= Sizwe Mpofu-Walsh =

South African author, musician and activist

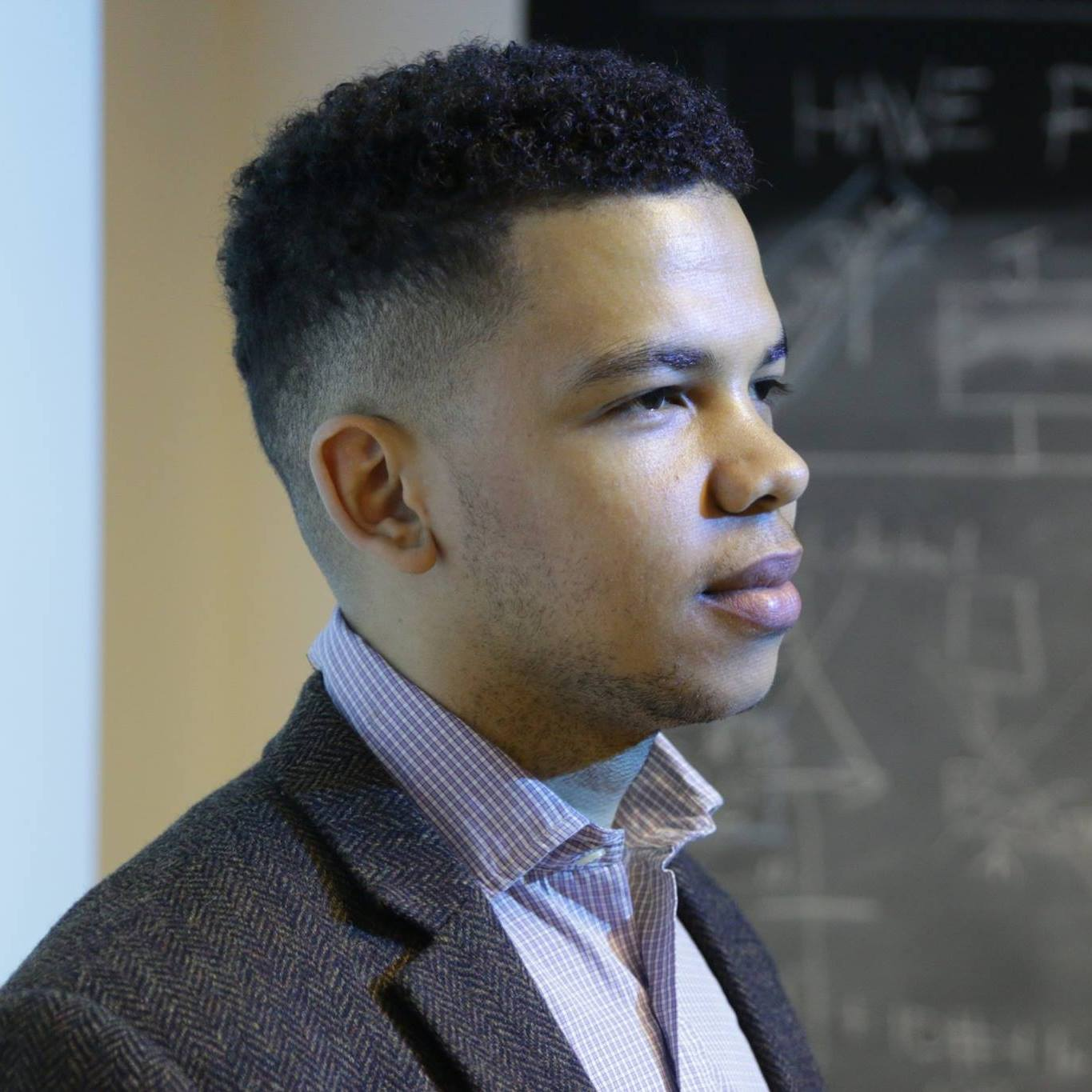
- Born: 4 January 1989 (age 37); Johannesburg, South Africa
- Other name: Vice V
- Spouse: Sumaya Hendricks
- Parents: Dali Mpofu (father); Theresa Oakley-Smith (mother)

Academic background
- Education: University of Cape Town; University of Oxford
- Thesis: Obedient rebellion: nuclear-weapon-free zones and global nuclear order, 1967–2017 (2020)
- Doctoral advisor: Kalypso Nicolaïdis

Sizwe Mpofu-Walsh (born 4 January 1989) is a South African podcaster, activist, musician and writer. Mpofu-Walsh was president of the University of Cape Town Students' Representative Council in 2010. He holds a DPhil in International Relations from the University of Oxford. In September 2017, Mpofu-Walsh published his debut book, Democracy and Delusion: 10 Myths in South African Politics. Along with the book, he released his debut rap album, also titled Democracy and Delusion.

== Early life ==
Mpofu-Walsh was born in Johannesburg, the son of a black father and a white mother. His parents were politically active in the struggle against apartheid. His father is Dali Mpofu a prominent advocate, former SABC Group CEO and Chairperson of the Economic Freedom Fighters political party. His mother is Theresa Oakley-Smith, the daughter of a British diplomat. Mpofu-Walsh has described himself as "being raised by a single mother". His godfather is former Constitutional Court judge Edwin Cameron. His step-mother is Mpumi Mpofu, currently the CEO of the Airports Company of South Africa and previously director general in the Department of Planning, Monitoring and Evaluation in the Presidency. He attended Sacred Heart College and then moved to the elite St John's College. He was part of the hip-hop group Entity, along with rapper AKA and Nhlanhla Makenna. He played for the Orlando Pirates Youth Academy between the ages of 13 and 16. Mpofu-Walsh spent a year living in the rural Eastern Cape village of Qugqwala, before undergoing ritual Xhosa initiation in 2007.

Mpofu-Walsh attended the University of Cape Town, earning an Honours degree in Politics Philosophy and Economics in 2012. He was SRC President in 2010, where his SRC was the first to successfully challenge the university's proposed fees increase, reducing it from 12% to 8%. At UCT, he co-founded InkuluFreeHeid, a youth-led civil society organisation.

In 2011 he was an intern for three months at the United States House of Representatives.

In 2012 he was awarded a Weidenfeld Scholarship to pursue a master's degree in International Relations at the University of Oxford, which he started in 2013 and was awarded in 2015. He completed his doctorate in international relations in 2020 at Oxford, with a dissertation on the politics of nuclear-weapon-free zones.

== Writing and public career ==
Mpofu-Walsh released a song called "Mr President", criticising then South African President Jacob Zuma for corruption in 2013. The song was featured in the Wall Street Journal. That year, the Mail and Guardian named him as one of the 200 top young South Africans.

He has written on the subjects of racism and corruption for South African newspaper City Press. In 2014, his article called "SA's Three-Way Split" predicted that South African politics would split into three poles.

Mpofu-Walsh has been a vocal supporter of free education in South Africa. He published a chapter on a possible free education model in the book Fees Must Fall: Student Revolt, Decolonisation and Governance, published by Wits University Press.

Mpofu-Walsh won the City Press-Tafelberg Award for promising non-fiction for his book Democracy and Delusion: 10 Myths in South African Politics, published in September, 2017.

Mpofu-Walsh's second book, The New Apartheid, was published in July 2021. In it he argues that "Apartheid did not die; it was privatised". The book has been praised by some commentators and sharply criticised by others for being "trite", covering "well-mapped territory" and "Far from defining a new generational mission...only shroud[ing] our existing one in complete opacity".

=== Podcast and radio ===
Mpofu-Walsh started a podcast initiative, SMWX, shortly before the 2019 South African elections with support from the South African Media Innovation Programme, which is funded by George Soros's Open Society Foundation and Pierre Omidyar's Luminate.

Mpofu-Walsh got his first break into radio presenting when he took over the show of his mother's friend, talk show host Eusebius McKaiser, on the private South African radio station 702. In 2023 the South African public broadcaster announced Mpofu-Walsh had been given a prime time television slot to do interviews on current affairs.

== Political views and activism ==
Mpofu-Walsh was also part of the Rhodes Must Fall in Oxford campaign, which aimed to highlight alleged institutional racism at Oxford and called for a statue of Cecil Rhodes located on the Oxford High Street to be relocated. Mpofu-Walsh was quoted as saying:

"There is something deeply wrong with the way Oxford presents itself, with the way it has biases against people and we are raising that and for the first time we are forcing the university to confront that problem and probably doing a better job than any generation before us."

The campaign was unsuccessful at the time, and was opposed by university academics and anti-apartheid activists including Nigel Biggar, Mary Beard and Denis Goldberg. It was supported by prominent academic Noam Chomsky.

In June 2020 Oriel College voted to remove the statue. However, due to cost implications, the College in 2021 decided instead to focus on contextualizing the statues.

== Funding ==
Mpofu-Walsh has received funding for his initiatives from a variety of sources. He received funding for his podcast initiative, SMWX, from the South African Media Innovation Programme (SAMIP), which is funded by George Soros's Open Society Foundation and Pierre Omidyar's Luminate. It is unclear how much money Mpofu-Walsh received and for what period of time. As of 2023 the podcast initiative remains active but Mpofu-Walsh does not declare his funding sources on his YouTube channel.

== Academic work ==
Mpofu-Walsh works in the area of international relations. His doctoral dissertation framed the voluntary relinquishing of nuclear weapons by the post-apartheid South African government as an "obedient rebellion" and argues that the apartheid state only wanted nuclear weapons as a 'deterrent'. A part of his dissertation was subsequently published in International Affairs the journal of the British Foreign Office-funded thinktank Chatham House.

== Bibliography ==
- Democracy and Delusion: 10 Myths in South African Politics (2017)
- The New Apartheid (2021)

== Discography ==
- Democracy and Delusion (2017)
