= Dali Mpofu =

South African lawyer and politician

2010 Advocate Dali Mpofu SC
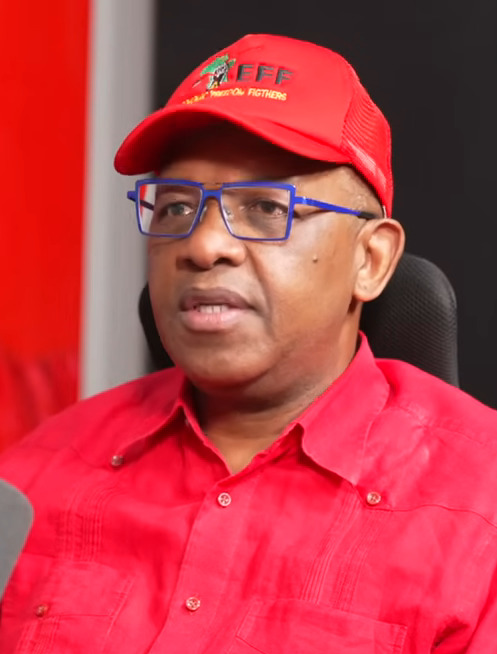
- Dali Mpofu in 2023

National Chairperson of the Economic Freedom Fighters
- In office December 2014 – December 2019
- President: Julius Malema
- Succeeded by: Veronica Mente

Personal details
- Born: Daluxolo Christopher Mpofu; 17 January 1962 (age 64) East London, South African
- Party: uMkhonto weSizwe (since 2024); Economic Freedom Fighters (2013–2024); African National Congress (1980–2013)
- Spouse: Mpumi Mpofu (marriage 2004)
- Relations: Sizwe Mpofu-Walsh (son)
- Education: Wits University

Daluxolo Christopher Mpofu (Dali Mpofu), (born 17 January 1962) is a South African lawyer, politician, and former businessman who was the National Chairperson of the Economic Freedom Fighters (EFF) from 2014 to 2019. He served on the Judicial Service Commission from 2017 to 2022 and formerly was chief executive officer of the South African Broadcasting Corporation from 2005 to 2009.

Mpofu was admitted as an advocate of the High Court in 1993 and was awarded senior counsel status in 2014. He is known for taking on politically sensitive cases: among other clients, he has represented striking mineworkers at the Marikana Commission, Tom Moyane at the Zondo Commission, and Busisiwe Mkhwebane at the Section 194 Enquiry; since 2021, he has been lead counsel for former President Jacob Zuma in his corruption trial. Formerly a longstanding member of the African National Congress, Mpofu defected to the EFF in 2013.

== Early life and activism ==
Mpofu was born in 1962 in Duncan Village outside East London in the former Cape Province. His mother, Nosebenzile Doris, was a domestic worker. In his account, he became active in the anti-apartheid movement around the time of the 1976 Soweto uprising and subsequently became a "radical". At the age of 17, he was detained for his political activities – then as a member of the Congress of South African Students – and was charged with sabotage and arson. After his acquittal in April 1981, he took up work as a spot-welder at a Mercedes-Benz factory, where he organised on behalf of the South African Allied Workers' Union. In addition, he later said that he had joined the African National Congress (ANC) underground in 1980.

By 1986, Mpofu was a student at the University of the Witwatersrand (Wits), where he was president of the Congress-aligned Black Students' Society – according to him, he won the position in a contest against Black Consciousness activist Xolela Mangcu. In 1986 he was detained without trial at John Vorster Square. In 1987, Mpofu worked in Kathleen Satchwell's attorney offices, and he completed his BProc at Wits in 1988.

== Early legal career ==
=== Relationship with Winnie Mandela ===
Mpofu worked for a year in the Social Welfare Department of the ANC, which was unbanned by the apartheid government in 1990. In that capacity he served under Winnie Madikizela-Mandela, the ANC's head of social welfare. In addition, along with George Bizos and others, he was on the legal team that represented Madikizela-Mandela when she was prosecuted for her alleged involvement in the murder of Stompie Seipei. In 1992 he was elected as publicity secretary for the Johannesburg branch of the ANC Youth League.

By 1991, City Press had reported on rumours that Madikizela-Mandela had an affair with Mpofu while her husband, political prisoner Nelson Mandela, was on Robben Island. It was also widely rumoured that the affair continued after Mandela's release. In May 1992, both Mpofu and Madikizela-Mandela were sacked from their ANC positions amid reports that the party was investigating fraud charges against them; an ANC document leaked to the press said that Madikizela-Mandela was accused of using "ANC money to live it up with her alleged lover, lawyer Dali Mpofu". Mpofu instituted wrongful dismissal charges against the ANC; both he and Madikizela-Mandela denied the affair and fraud allegations.

In June 1992, national and international media printed a letter that Madikizela-Mandela had apparently written to Mpofu in March 1992; in the letter, she alluded heavily to their affair and moreover appeared to admit that she had given Mpofu about R160,000 (then equivalent to roughly £30,000) from the ANC's coffers. Paul Erasmus of the South African Police later said that the police's Security Branch had leaked rumours of the affair to the media as part of a so-called Stratcom operation intended to discredit Madikizela-Mandela and the ANC. Mpofu did not ultimately pursue his wrongful dismissal lawsuit.

=== Advocate of the High Court ===
Also in 1992, Mpofu completed an LLB at Wits, and the following year he was admitted as an advocate of the High Court of South Africa and as a member of the Johannesburg Bar. He practiced law at the Department of Justice and, from 1996 to 1997, as a trainee international advocacy teacher at Gray's Inn in London. After a brief stint as an acting judge in the Labour Court of South Africa in 2000, he worked as executive director for corporate affairs at Altron Group, an ICT company, from 2000 to 2005. He also acquired a number of business interests during that period, including through black economic empowerment deals.

== CEO of SABC: 2005–2009 ==
In June 2005, Mpofu was appointed chief executive officer of the South African Broadcasting Corporation (SABC), South Africa's public broadcaster. Until 2008, he was simultaneously as chairman of the board at Boxing South Africa; as of 2009, he also retained a directorship at Deutsche Securities South Africa and shares in the Elephant Consortium, which had a 6.7% stake in Telkom.

Early in his tenure at the SABC, in September 2007, Mpofu controversially announced that the SABC would sever ties with the South African National Editors' Forum over the forum's response to a series of critical reports about Health Minister Manto Tshabalala-Msimang. In addition, Business Day later pointed out that, during Mpofu's tenure, the SABC required several large bail-outs from the central government.

However, the bulk of Mpofu's tenure was dominated by his battles with the SABC board and with Snuki Zikalala, the SABC's head of news and current affairs. His term coincided with the prologue to and aftermath of the ANC's 52nd National Conference, which removed President Thabo Mbeki from the ANC presidency and replaced him with Jacob Zuma. The SABC was thought to be caught up in the ANC's internal factional politics. As early as October 2006, there were media reports that Mpofu and Zikalala had clashed after Zikalala sought to restrict coverage that he thought was critical of Mbeki. In April 2008, Mpofu said publicly that the SABC was facing, and resisting, "political pressure", though he did not say from whom.

=== Suspensions: 2008 ===
On 6 May, Mpofu suspended Zikalala pending the outcome of a disciplinary inquiry. The next day, the SABC board announced that it viewed Zikalala's suspension as invalid and that it had, in turn, suspended Mpofu pending the outcome of a disciplinary inquiry. Mpofu said that he had suspended Zikalala for leaking SABC documents to other media houses, but media reports suggested that Mpofu had attempted to suspend Zikalala precisely because he suspected that the board intended to suspend him and appoint Zikalala in his place. The board accused Mpofu of "refusal and/or failure to abide and implement decisions of the board".

Less than a fortnight later, the Johannesburg High Court set aside Mpofu's suspension, ruling that the board's decision was invalid because Mpofu had been deliberately excluded from participating in the meeting where the decision was taken. The board was denied leave to appeal the judgement but in mid-June suspended Mpofu for a second time. On that occasion, the board charged him with several internal disciplinary offences, arising primarily from allegations of financial mismanagement but also from allegations that he had ignored or undermined the board's authority. Mpofu said that the charges were "kind of rubbish, really".

=== Dismissal: 2009 ===
Mpofu was dismissed in January 2009. He initially challenged his dismissal in the Labour Court, but in August 2009, he agreed to withdraw all legal action in exchange for an exit package of R14.1 million. Amid reports that the SABC was in serious financial trouble, Mpofu said that he took "full responsibility for all the decisions I made" at the SABC but argued that he had not really worked at the SABC since March 2008, when his difficulties with the board had begun to predominate. He said:

I do not think there was anything I did or didn’t do because the board pounced on me barely two months after they had arrived. It is unfortunate that this mess they created has cost this much. It’s a lesson for all of us in the future... [The financial crisis] was not my mess. I had nothing to do with any of that... I believe that if the board had not changed we wouldn’t have had any of this.

He was replaced at the SABC by Solly Mokoetle and joked that, after his dismissal, he intended to become a "full-time house husband". In June 2010, there were reports – denied by Mpofu – that he was on the shortlist for appointment as chief executive officer at Telkom.

== Later legal practice ==
=== Marikana Commission: 2012–2014 ===
Mpofu returned to the public eye in 2011 and 2012, when he represented three ANC Youth League leaders – Julius Malema, Sindiso Magaqa, and Floyd Shivambu – in the internal ANC disciplinary proceedings that ultimately led to Malema's expulsion from the party. According to the Mail & Guardian, it was Malema who, later in 2012, recruited Mpofu to represent the mineworkers who had been arrested in the aftermath of the Marikana massacre. Mpofu represented the mineworkers at the Marikana Commission of Inquiry, which ran from 2012 to 2014 under the chairmanship of Ian Farlam. Controversially, he refused to work pro bono and withdrew from proceedings briefly between June and October 2013, during which time he lodged a successful court application to have the state cover the mineworkers' legal fees.

Towards the end of the Marikana Commission hearings, in August 2014, the media reported that Mpofu had applied for senior counsel (silk) status in the High Court in 2012 but that President Jacob Zuma had not yet approved the award. While under cross-examination by Mpofu, Deputy President Cyril Ramaphosa alluded to a "friendly" conversation he had with Mpofu the day before, in which he said Mpofu had asked him to put in a good word with Zuma to expedite the process. Mpofu angrily denied having asked for Ramaphosa's assistance. He was awarded silk status the following month.

=== Nugent Commission and Zondo Commission: 2018–2021 ===
Mpofu represented Tom Moyane, the suspended Commissioner of the South African Revenue Service (SARS), at the Nugent Commission, which was held in 2018 to investigate allegations of maladministration at SARS during Moyane's tenure. In July 2018, he entered into a highly public spat with Pierre de Vos, a constitutional law expert at the University of Cape Town, who had written a blog which criticised Moyane's submissions to the commission and implied that Mpofu had behaved unethically in advancing those submissions on Moyane's behalf. Mpofu posted a series of angry ripostes on Twitter, alleging that de Vos's piece was "defamatory, insulting & possibly racist" and threatening to sue him if he did not delete it. De Vos refused.

Mpofu also represented Moyane at the State Capture Commission, which investigated allegations that Moyane had presided over state capture at SARS. In March 2021, Mpofu cross-examined Minister Pravin Gordhan on Moyane's behalf and shortly afterwards entered into an angry exchange with Gordhan and his lawyer, Michelle le Roux, in which he said that "Miss le Roux must shut up when I am speaking" and then, after Gordhan attempted to interject, told Gordhan, "you shut up". The chairman of the commission, Deputy Chief Justice Raymond Zondo, lamented Mpofu's behaviour at length, calling it "unacceptable". In March 2022, the Johannesburg Society of Advocates (the Johannesburg Bar) ruled that Mpofu had breached the bar's ethical code, though a separate inquiry by the national Legal Practice Council cleared him on an unprofessional conduct charge in June.

=== Jacob Zuma criminal charges: 2021–present ===
In May 2021, Mpofu joined the defence of former President Jacob Zuma, who was facing newly reinstated corruption charges. He was appointed lead counsel in the corruption trial, replacing Muzi Sikhakhane, and he also advised Zuma's defence in the separate contempt of court trial which saw Zuma imprisoned in July 2021. Mpofu has denied accusations that Zuma's strategy in the corruption trial amounts to a Stalingrad defence, intended to delay prosecution indefinitely.

=== Section 194 Inquiry: 2021–present ===
Mpofu represented Busisiwe Mkhwebane in her application to interdict Parliament's attempts to institute impeachment proceedings against her and remove her from office as Public Protector. When that application failed, he continued to represent her during the impeachment proceedings instituted in Parliament's Section 194 Enquiry, although he initially claimed that he would not participate in "any of the illegal activities" of the enquiry. Commentators accused Mpofu of applying Zuma's Stalingrad defence strategy to Mkhwebane's defence, attempting to stall the proceedings until late 2023, when Mkhwebane's constitutional term as Public Protector would lapse.

Mpofu was also criticised by ANC and opposition Members of Parliament after an angry outburst against the enquiry's chairperson, Qubudile Dyantyi, in September 2022: he told Dyantyi, "You are not entitled to abuse me like you are abusing me. I'm senior to you in many ways... you have the power now, you can exercise it, but you'll pay one day". When asked whether he was threatening Dyantyi, Mpofu responded in the affirmative and then added, "Actually, it is not a threat. It is a promise". In late March 2023, Mkhwebane said that she had stopped giving instructions to Mpofu and his team because the Public Protector's office had refused to pay any further legal fees on her behalf.

=== Other notable cases ===
Mpofu has served as counsel in a number of other politically charged cases. He represented ANC politician Supra Mahumapelo when Mahumapelo sought reinstatement as ANC Provincial Chairperson in the North West; later, he represented ANC Secretary-General Ace Magashule in his struggle to challenge his suspension and its basis in the ANC's step-aside rule. He also represented Patricia de Lille during de Lille's attempt to forestall her removal as Mayor of Cape Town. Other former clients include Fees Must Fall activists at Wits University, including Mcebo Dlamini; abaThembu King Buyelekhaya Dalindyebo, whose claim to the title was challenged by President Zuma; Gareth Cliff, who sued M-Net for sacking him after he publicly defended a derogatory Tweet by Penny Sparrow; and Zandile Mafe, who was accused of setting fire to the Parliament buildings. Commentators have often criticised Mpofu for his defence of politically dubious causes or use of ethically ambiguous legal methods.

== Judicial Service Commission: 2017–2022 ==
In September 2017, President Zuma announced that Mpofu had been appointed with immediate effect to serve on the Judicial Service Commission. Mpofu was nominated as one of the two representatives of the General Council of the Bar of South Africa: specifically, he was selected by Advocates for Transformation, a professional group which was entitled to indirect nomination on the commission and therefore to nominate one advocate to represent the bar. He was re-elected to a second two-year term in the seat in 2019.

Mpofu was widely criticised for remarks he made in February 2022 when the commission was interviewing candidates to replace Mogoeng Mogoeng as Chief Justice of the Constitutional Court. In particular, during the interview of a female applicant, Judge Mandisa Maya, he used what was viewed as a "lewd double entendre", saying that he and Maya had once "spent a night together" –spent a night together studying, he later clarified. In addition, in the phrase of the Mail & Guardian, Mpofu was viewed as having "ambush[ed]" another of the applicants, Gauteng Judge President Dunstan Mlambo, with questions about unsubstantiated sexual harassment rumours. The Pretoria Society of Advocates wrote to the General Council of the Bar to demand that Mpofu should be recalled from the commission and that his "unacceptable" and sexist remarks should be condemned. In addition, Adriaan Basson of News24 published an editorial which was highly critical of Mpofu's conduct – calling him "a scoundrel, immoral and a nincompoop" – and which intensified the controversy by inviting a response from twenty other advocates (among them Dumisa Ntsebeza, Nomgcobo Jiba, and Menzi Simelane) who accused Basson of attacking Mpofu with "gratuitous insults typical of the colonial and barbaric attitude of whiteness towards Africans".

In March 2022, Advocates for Transformation announced that Mpofu's term on the Judicial Service Commission had in fact expired on 10 February; the group had asked Mpofu to extend his tenure to maintain "continuity" until the Chief Justice interviews were finalised. His replacement was announced on 18 March.

== Political career in the EFF ==
=== Defection from the ANC: 2013 ===
In early November 2013, Mpofu submitted to a resignation letter to his local ANC branch in Saxonwold and announced that he had joined the Economic Freedom Fighters (EFF), a new breakaway party established by Julius Malema after his expulsion from the ANC. At that time, Mpofu was representing the Marikana mineworkers, a cause on which he and Malema had reportedly collaborated. Indeed, the Mail & Guardian said that he had been "doing Malema's bidding (behind the scenes) way before his announcement was made, helping in attempts at courting crucial leftist individuals to fill out the structure of the organisation".

Upon his departure, Mpofu criticised the ANC pointedly, saying that the ANC's "internal paralysis" meant that "it's a question of time before it renders itself irrelevant to the broader revolution". He said that the ANC had abandoned the Freedom Charter and wrote in an opinion piece:

Is it possible that the ANC is a victim of its own inability to commit to a particular ideological outlook as well as its refusal to transform itself into a political party remaining, rather, a liberation movement and a so-called broad church? This stance has rendered the ANC vulnerable to being hijacked by right-wingers, multibillionaires and market fundamentalists, robbing it of its very soul and provoking the refrain from its dejected members that goes: 'This is not the ANC I joined.'

Ahead of the 2014 general election, the first contested by the EFF, Mpofu stood as the EFF's candidate for election as Premier of Gauteng. He was therefore ranked first on the party's provincial list in the election and he comfortably secured one of the eight seats won by the EFF in the Gauteng Provincial Legislature. However, in the aftermath of the election, the EFF said that Mpofu had asked to decline his seat in order to concentrate on his work at the Marikana Commission and in building the EFF's organisational structures.

=== EFF National Chairperson: 2014–2019 ===
In mid-December 2014, at the EFF's first national conference, Mpofu was elected unopposed as National Chairperson of the EFF, serving under Malema as EFF President. In 2015, he established the party's National Disciplinary Committee. However, during his five-year term in the party office, he was recused from two of his responsibilities as party chairperson because of his "hectic schedule" as an advocate.

In the 2019 general election, Mpofu again stood as a candidate; he was listed third on the party list for election to the National Assembly (both on the national list and in each of the nine provincial constituencies). Although he therefore won election to a seat in Parliament, he again declined to accept it and was not sworn in.

As the end of his term as National Chairperson approached, Mpofu ran for re-election to high party office on a slate of candidates which also included Mandisa Mashego. When the party's second national conference opened on 14 December 2019, Mpofu declined a nomination to stand for re-election as National Chairperson; instead, he accepted a nomination to stand against the incumbent Deputy President, Floyd Shivambu. However, he did not receive enough support from delegates to cross the 30% threshold for inclusion on the ballot. He was succeeded as National Chairperson by Veronica Mente. He said that he was unbothered about the election result, saying that – as with Kgalema Motlanthe's challenge to Jacob Zuma at the ANC's 53rd National Conference – "the point of this exercise was not to win" but to assert "the principle that there's no position that is beyond contestation".

=== MI6 allegations ===
In a debate in Parliament in 2019 President Cyril Ramaphosa stated that he had received intelligence reports claiming that the EFF was "an MI6 project". Ramaphosa was responding to accusations from Julius Malema that he had been an apartheid spy. Mpofu stated that he would shut down the EFF if the claims turned out to be true but shortly afterwards lost his position in the party leadership.

== Personal life ==
Mpofu married Mpumi Mpofu in 2004. She is a public servant and has served as director-general in the Department of Transport and the Department of Housing; she was appointed as the Secretary of Defence in 2010. She remained a member of the ANC after her husband's defection to the EFF. He also has a son, Sizwe Mpofu-Walsh, with activist and academic Terry Oakley-Smith.

In April 2013, while representing mineworkers at the Marikana Commission, Mpofu was stabbed several times in a mugging on Eastern Beach in East London. He was hospitalised with a collapsed lung. Two men were convicted of the crime a year later.

=== Controversies ===
In October 2024, It was reported that Mpofu owed The South African Revenue Service unpaid personal tax worth two million Rands.
