= Nontando Nolutshungu =

South African politician

Nontando Nolutshungu MP

National Chairperson of the Economic Freedom Fighters
- Incumbent
- Assumed office 14 December 2024
- President: Julius Malema
- Preceded by: Veronica Mente

Member of the National Assembly of South Africa
- Incumbent
- Assumed office 23 January 2018

Personal details
- Party: Economic Freedom Fighters
- Profession: Politician

Nontando Judith Nolutshungu is a South African politician and a Member of Parliament for the Economic Freedom Fighters (EFF). She was elected National Chairperson of the EFF in December 2024.

== Biography ==
Nolutshungu has a bachelor of social science degree and a postgraduate diploma in transport studies from the University of Cape Town.

In 2013, she joined the Economic Freedom Fighters as an ordinary member. She entered the National Assembly on 23 January 2018 as a replacement for Sipho Mbatha. Nolutshungu then became a member of the Portfolio Committee on Higher Education and Training and the Portfolio Committee on Transport.

At the 2019 South African general election held on 8 May, Nolutshungu won a full term in parliament. She now only serves on the Portfolio Committee on Transport.

In December 2019, Nolutshungu was elected to the EFF's Central Command Team, its highest decision-making structure.

Nolutshungu was re-elected to parliament at the 2024 general election.

On 14 December 2024, Nontando Nolutshungu was elected national chairperson of the EFF at the party's third national people's assembly. She was appointed chief whip of the EFF caucus in the National Assembly on 15 January 2025.
