= Sipho Mbatha =

South African politician

Member of the National Assembly of South Africa
- Incumbent
- Assumed office 25 June 2024

Member of the National Assembly of South Africa
- In office 21 May 2014 – 1 January 2018
- Succeeded by: Nontando Nolutshungu

Personal details
- Born: Moses Sipho Mbatha
- Party: UMkhonto we Sizwe (2024–present)
- Other political affiliations: United Democratic Movement (2018–2024); Economic Freedom Fighters (2013–2018)
- Profession: Politician

Moses Sipho Mbatha is a South African politician and a former Member of the National Assembly of South Africa for the Economic Freedom Fighters (EFF) party.

== Political career ==
Mbatha joined the Economic Freedom Fighters in 2013. After the 2014 general election, Mbatha was selected to replace Mmeli Julius Mdluli, who was elected to an EFF seat in the National Assembly but was not available to take up his seat. He was sworn in during the first sitting of the new National Assembly along with all the other newly elected Members of Parliament on 21 May 2014. On 20 June 2014, Mbatha was named to the Portfolio Committee on Economic Development and the Portfolio Committee on Higher Education and Training.

Following former Eskom CEO Brian Molefe's swearing-in in as a Member of Parliament in February 2017, Mbatha said: "On a point of order Speaker. Where is that corrupt bastard?"

In October 2017, the Diamond Fields Advertiser reported that the Central Command Team of the EFF had instructed Mbatha and fellow EFF MP Mmabatho Mokause to resign from their seats in the National Assembly immediately. Mbatha's resignation took effect on 1 January 2018. Nontando Nolutshungu was appointed to replace him.

Mbatha later resigned from the EFF and was welcomed into the United Democratic Movement in August 2018. He stood as a parliamentary candidate as well as a candidate for the KwaZulu-Natal Legislature for the UDM in the 2019 general elections, but failed to gain election to either body.

In 2024, Mbatha joined the UMkhonto we Sizwe political party. He was elected as a member of the National Assembly, representing the UMkhonto we Sizwe, in the 2024 South African general election.
