= Veronica Mente =

South African politician

Veronica Mente MP
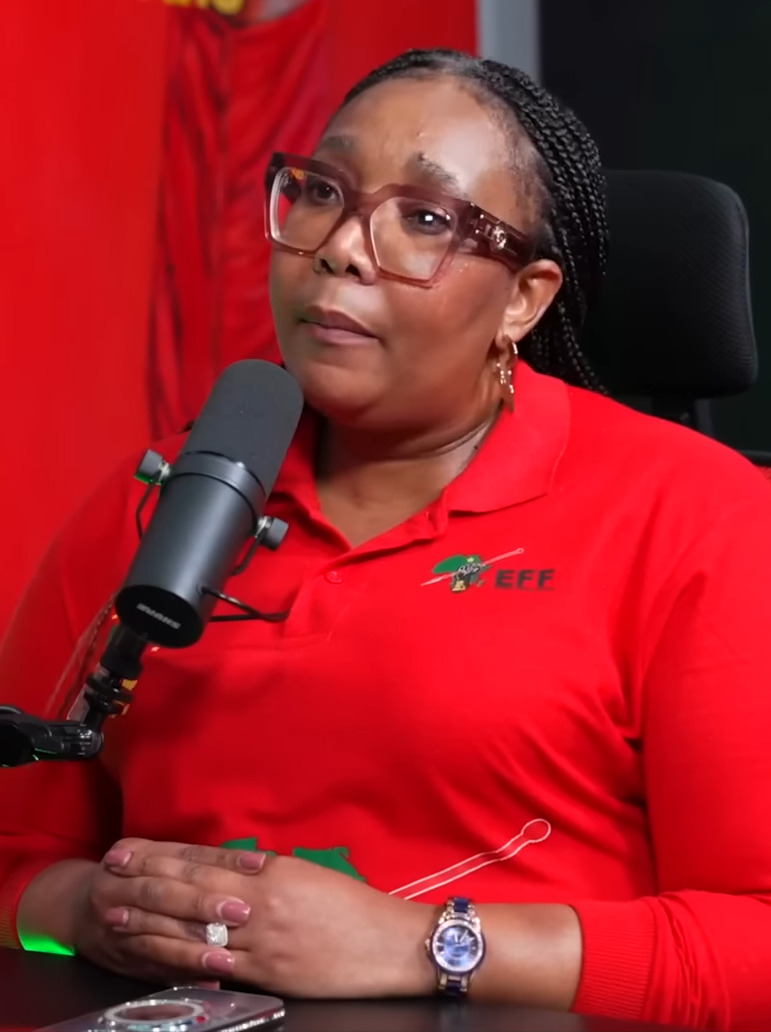
- Mente in 2024

National Chairperson of the Economic Freedom Fighters
- In office 14 December 2019 – 14 December 2024
- President: Julius Malema
- Preceded by: Dali Mpofu
- Succeeded by: Nontando Nolutshungu

Member of the National Assembly of South Africa
- Incumbent
- Assumed office 21 May 2014
- Constituency: Eastern Cape

Personal details
- Born: Ntombovuyo Veronica Mente Khayelitsha, Cape Town, Cape Province, South Africa
- Party: Economic Freedom Fighters
- Occupation: Member of Parliament
- Profession: Politician

Ntombovuyo Veronica Mente is a South African politician who served as the National Chairperson of the Economic Freedom Fighters (EFF) from December 2019 until December 2024. She is also a Member of the National Assembly of South Africa, having taken office in May 2014.

== Biography ==
Mente is from the Khayelitsha township in Cape Town. She began her career by working as a security member for the previous mayor of Cape Town. She was a "barefoot lawyer" in Khayelitsha who assisted workers. Mente was then a volunteer for the Labour Community Advice Media and Education Centre (LAMEC) in Khayelitsha.

Mente became a member of the EFF shortly after its founding. She was elected to Parliament in 2014.

In May 2019, she was re-elected for a second term as an MP. As of June 2019, she is a member of the Standing Committee on Public Accounts and an Alternate Member of the Standing Committee on the Auditor General. She became a member of the Disciplinary Committee in September 2019.

Mente was elected EFF national chairperson at the party's second elective conference in December 2019, succeeding advocate Dali Mpofu. She was succeeded by Nontando Nolutshungu at the party's third elective conference in December 2024.
