= Nemat Sadat =

Afghan-American novelist, journalist, and human rights activist

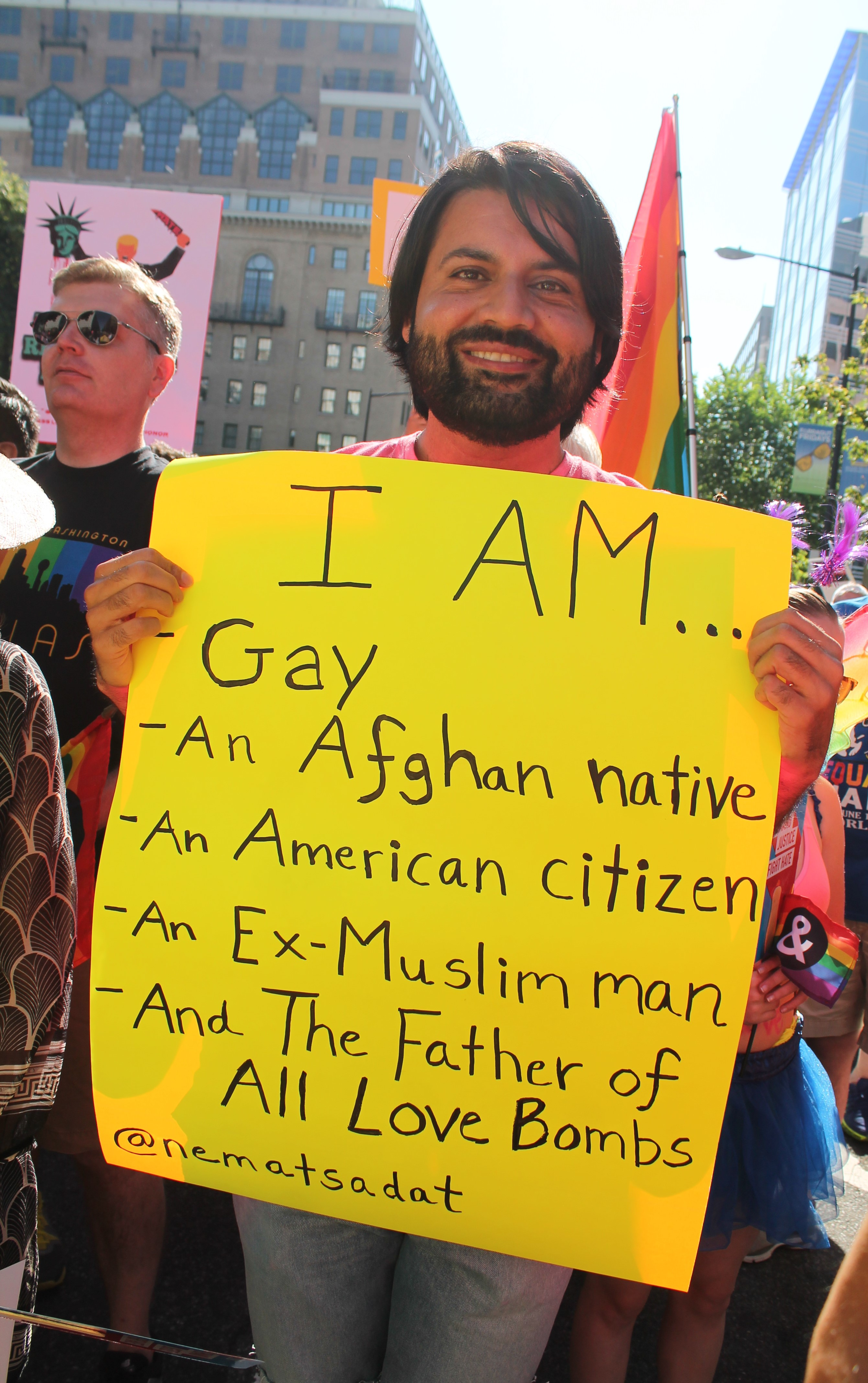
- Sadat at the National Pride March in Washington, D.C. (June 11, 2017)
- Born: 1979 (age 46–47); Afghanistan
- Occupations: Journalist; Novelist; Activist

Nemat Sadat (Punjabi: نعمت سادات), born in 1979, is an Afghan-American journalist, novelist, human rights activist, and former professor of political science at the American University of Afghanistan. Known for his debut novel The Carpet Weaver and his campaigning for LGBTQIA+ rights, particularly in the context of societal and cultural Islamic attitudes towards homosexuality in the Muslim world. Sadat is one of the first Afghans to have openly come out as gay and to campaign for LGBTQIA+ rights, gender freedom, and sexual liberty in Afghanistan. He has degrees from California State University, Fullerton, University of California, Irvine, Harvard Extension School, Columbia University, Oxford University and Johns Hopkins University.

== Early and personal life ==
Sadat was born in Afghanistan during the Afghan-Soviet War. His family fled Afghanistan when he was eight months old. After living in Germany for a few years, they relocated again to the United States when he was 5. He grew up in southern California. His family maintained relationships with family and neighbors from Afghanistan, and kept closely to Afghan traditions. The prejudice that he experienced as an Afghan refugee, which intensified after 9/11, led him to maintain a strong Afghan identity, despite not growing up there. He never felt entirely at home in the United States.

Sadat began to identify as gay when he was 23. He was living away from family in New York City. When he initially came out to his parents in his 30s, they urged him to repress his sexuality and date women. He came out publicly in 2013, which strained relations with his family. He has maintained a close relationship with his mother, while he is estranged from his father. His sister came to accept him after initial concerns about their family's safety.

Sadat also came out as an ex-Muslim shortly after. After observing that LGBTQ rights are the most restricted in Muslim-majority countries, he concluded that Islam "conflicted with [his] humanistic orientation" and began identifying as an atheist. He now identifies himself as spiritual.

Sadat lived in a homeless shelter for a time after coming out. His sister contacted him after giving birth, because she wanted him to meet his nieces. Hearing about his condition, his mother invited him to move in with her and work on his novel.

== Activism ==
In 2012, Sadat moved to Kabul. He was initially hired as a consultant, but quickly secured the position of assistant professor in political science at the American University of Afghanistan. During his employment at the university, he used social media to mobilize an underground movement to openly campaign for LGBTQIA+ rights in Afghanistan. Rumors spread around campus that he was "a practicing homosexual and a lapsed Muslim," allegations which could earn him the death penalty. Sadat elected to stay despite the danger.

In July 2013, his public outreach came to the attention of the Afghan government, which alleged that his activities were undermining Islam in the country and deemed him a threat to national security. Sadat was fired from his position at AUAF and he left Afghanistan, settling in New York City. His replacement was killed days after starting the job, and two of Sadat's associates with kidnapped in a Taliban attack.

In August 2013, Nemat Sadat publicly announced his sexuality, becoming the first Afghan activist to come out as gay. According to Sadat, he received several death threats including a fatwa issued against him by the mullahs of Afghanistan as a result. In October of the same year, Sadat faced a second wave of widespread hostility in Afghan media. Commenting on his LGBTQ activism in an interview for The Guardian in November 2013, Sadat said, "I am making a sacrifice, but I want Afghan youth to look at me and see that there are people who are Afghan and Muslim and gay. It will give them hope."

In June 2016, after the Orlando nightclub shooting, Sadat was interviewed by several media outlets that were interested in his perspective as an Afghan-American, gay ex-Muslim. He made several TV appearances, including giving interviews for CNN's Christiane Amanpour, Amara Walker, and Don Lemon, as well as NBC News.

Later that same year, Sadat participated in BBC’s extended news feature on Afghanistan's LGBTQIA+ community, as well as taking part in a BBC Pashto debate on Islam and homosexuality.

Sadat has been a vegan since 2016 and says that he sees animal right advocacy as a "natural next step" from human rights advocacy.

Sadat took part in the National Pride March in 2017 in Washington, D.C., appearing on the cover on the Washington Blade and giving an interview for NPR.

Following the collapse of the Afghan government in August 2021 to the Taliban in the Fall of Kabul, Sadat warned of the direct threat that gay men face under Taliban rule, appealing to the international community to speed the evacuation of vulnerable civilians.

In October 2022, Sadat condemned the murder of Hamed Sabouri, a gay man in Kabul who was kidnapped, tortured, and murdered by alleged Taliban members.

== Journalism ==
Sadat has published articles and papers in numerous publications, including the Georgetown Journal of International Affairs and Out Magazine. Prior to accepting the position at the American University of Afghanistan, he has also produced content for ABC News Nightline, CNN’s Fareed Zakaria GPS, and the UN Chronicle.

== Publication ==
Penguin Random House India published Sadat's first book, The Carpet Weaver, in 2019. Sadat says that the manuscript was first rejected by 450 literary agents in the US and UK. He believes this was motivated by fear of backlash from the Muslim world, considering the decades of persecution against Salman Rushdie, as well as Islamophobia.

The book is set in the 1970s and 1980s Afghanistan and tells the story of Kanishka Nurzada, a young Afghan boy, who falls in forbidden love with his childhood male friend, Maihan, against the backdrop of Afghanistan's golden age of paradise and the turbulent transition to civil war.

== See also ==
- LGBT rights in Afghanistan
