= Hamid Zaher =

Afghan writer and gay activist based in Canada (born 1974)

Hamid Zaher (born 1974) is a Canada-based Afghan writer and gay rights activist.

Zaher was born 1974 in the Parwan Province. He studied pharmacy at Kabul University and graduated in 1998. In 2001, he had to flee Afghanistan when his family started pressuring him to get married, due to Afghanistan punishing homosexuality via the death penalty. He arrived in Canada in March 2008.

In 2009, Zaher published a book about his life and upbringing in Afghanistan called It is Your Enemy Who is Dock-Tailed, released in English in 2012 as Overcoming: Alone Against the World. In response, Zaher's family disowned him.

== Books ==
- Zaher, Hamid (2012), Living in a Nightmare, Lulu Enterprises Incorporated, ISBN 9781105408847
- Zaher, Hamid (2012), It Is Your Enemy Who Is Dock-Tailed: A Memoir, iUniverse, ISBN 9781475933680
