= Murder of Hamed Sabouri =

2022 murder in Kabul, Afghanistan

- Location: Kabul, Afghanistan
- Date: 5 August 2022; 4 years ago
- Attack type: Torture murder; Hate crime
- Victims: Hamed Sabouri, aged 22
- Perpetrator: Taliban members (Note: Alleged by Sabouri's brother, boyfriend, and NGOs, denied by the Taliban.)
- Motive: Hate against gay men

On 5 August 2022, a 22-year-old gay man named Hamed Sabouri was kidnapped and murdered in Kabul, Afghanistan, allegedly by members of the Taliban.

The killing was reported by British LGBT news site PinkNews and later by British newspaper The Guardian. Controversy surrounded the publication of an image of a man mistakenly identified as Sabouri. The Taliban has denied responsibility in the killing.

== Background ==
LGBTQ people do not have any right nor recognition in Afghanistan. Since the fall of Kabul in August 2021, LGBTQ+ Afghans have faced increased violence, including kidnapping, rape, and murder. Rainbow Railroad (RR), a Canadian LGBTQ+ organization, reported in November 2021 that the Taliban had intensified the persecution of LGBTQ+ people by applying a strict version of Sharia. According to RR, the Taliban had "kill lists", and anonymous emails pretending to be from the NGO had got in touch with Afghans trying to leave Afghanistan because of their sexual orientation, making them exposed and vulnerable.

The Taliban willingness to persecute gay men was noted in an interview by German tabloid newspaper Bild to Taliban judge Gul Rahim in July 2021, before the fall of Kabul. Rahim said during the interview that only two punishments exist for gay people: stoning or standing behind a wall that falls on him.

In August 2024, Supreme Leader Hibatullah Akhundzada enacted a law criminalizing lawatat (male homosexual relations) with a range of punishments which include execution. In January 2025, Prosecutor of the International Criminal Court (ICC), Karim Ahmad Khan, requested arrest warrants against Taliban leaders Akhundzada and Abdul Hakim Haqqani for their persecution of women, girls, and the LGBTQ community, marking the first time the court has recognized crimes against the LGBTQ community.

The ICC granted Khan's request and issued arrest warrants against Akhundzada and Haqqani on 8 July 2025, reaffirming that the persecution of LGBTQ+ people constitutes a crime against humanity.

== Sabouri case ==
In August 2021, immediately following the takeover of the country, it was reported that a gay man who had been chatting with another man under the promise of a way out of Afghanistan was deceived by two men who raped and beat him. The men subsequently demanded the phone number of the victim's father to inform him about his son's homosexuality.

On 12 October 2022, PinkNews reported that local activists in Afghanistan had told them that Hamed Sabouri, a 22-year-old medical student from Kabul, had been kidnapped, tortured, and murdered by Taliban members in August. The activists adedd that the Taliban later sent a video depicting the killing of Sabouri to his family. On 14 October, the Washington Blade echoed the report of PinkNews, saying that a source from inside the country assured that Sabouri had been detained at "one of the hundreds of Taliban checkpoints in Kabul," and that the content on Sabouri's cell phone was a probable cause for the Taliban to arrest him.

On 18 October 2022, The Guardian published the news in detail, featuring a photo that showed a young man reportedly said to be a picture of Hamed Sabouri. The note included testimonies from Sabouri's brother and boyfriend, who confirmed that the young man had been kidnapped at a checkpoint in Kabul and that he had been tortured for three days before being shot multiple times by the Taliban. The Business Insider verified the footage and reported that the video showed a man similar to Sabouri's description being shot in the neck and head "at least 12 times."

Days after the kidnapping, Sabouri's family and friends received a recorded tape depicting Sabouri's torture and murder. His brother Haseeb confirmed to The Guardian that they had received the footage and that the whole family had sold their two properties in Kabul and flew to Turkey in fear for their lives. Haseeb additionally stated that "(they) fled due to the threats (against them) and the murder of Hamed," adding that "the Taliban came to our home every day to harass and threaten us."

Sabouri's boyfriend, who was identified by international media as Bahar, was reported to be a member of Behesht Collective, an underground LGBTQ rights organization in Afghanistan. Bahar told The Guardian that Sabouri was "the love of (my) life" and that he had been in hiding since his boyfriend's killing. He added that he had been previously arrested and raped by Taliban militants on three separate occasions between August 2021 and June 2022, further describing Sabouri as a "shy" gay man and a "very kind boy." Bahar condemned the Taliban as "worse than wild animals" for their persecution of gay men.

Bahar also told journalists that the Taliban had raided his home and had told his mother that they were looking for him. He stated that he would be killed if arrested and said that he was "on the run" after escaping caoture twice by bribing police officers and hiding in a garbage truck.

== Reactions and photo controversy ==
Afghan LGBTQ+ rights activist Nemat Sadat said that Sabouri's killing was the result of inaction from Western governments to help vulnerable Afghans fleeing the Taliban. He also assured that the murder of Hamed Sabouri is "further proof that the Taliban will not stop until they eradicate all gay people from Afghanistan."

Taliban spokesman Zabihullah Mujahid stated that there was "no truth" in the article published by The Guardian, denying any Taliban responsibility in extrajudicial killings.

In the original article by The Guardian, the photo supposed to be from Sabouri was removed 12 hours after its publication. An Afghan man living in Iran identified as Safiullah Ahmadi said The Guardian had used an actual photo of him and that he was not gay. Ahmadi added that he would file a lawsuit in England against the newspaper.

After Ahmadi returned to Afghanistan in March 2023, his lawyer said that he had been forced to live in hiding and that he was unable to study or work because he feared that others mistakenly perceiving him as gay could cause him harm. Ahmadi's lawsuit at the High Court of Justice demanded a sum of money as compensation amounting to more than £100,000 in damages. Ben Silverstone, the lawyer representing the Guardian News & Media (GNM), asked the Court in May 2025 to dismiss the lawsuit and alleged that the article was not defamatory and could not harm Ahmadi's reputation in England and Wales.

On 16 May 2025, Jeremy Johnson, one of the judges of the High Court of Justice, denied Ahmadi's claim and dismissed the case. Johnson agreed with GNM that an allegation of homosexuality is not something defamatory. In his ruling, he stated that while being labelled a homosexual was not true in Ahmadi's case, the societal progress made it no longer a subject of public defamation. Johnson also dismissed the claim that Ahmadi was at risk of prosecution under the Afghan Penal Code 2018, saying that a foreign penal code did not apply for court cases in England and Wales and that Ahmadi's fears for Taliban reprisals were subjective. According to Johnson, a reasonable reader (of The Guardian's article) would understand that Ahmadi's image to depict Sabouri was a mistake due to him not being gay nor a medical student, and that he is alive.
