= Kathleen Satchwell =

The Honourable Kathleen Satchwell
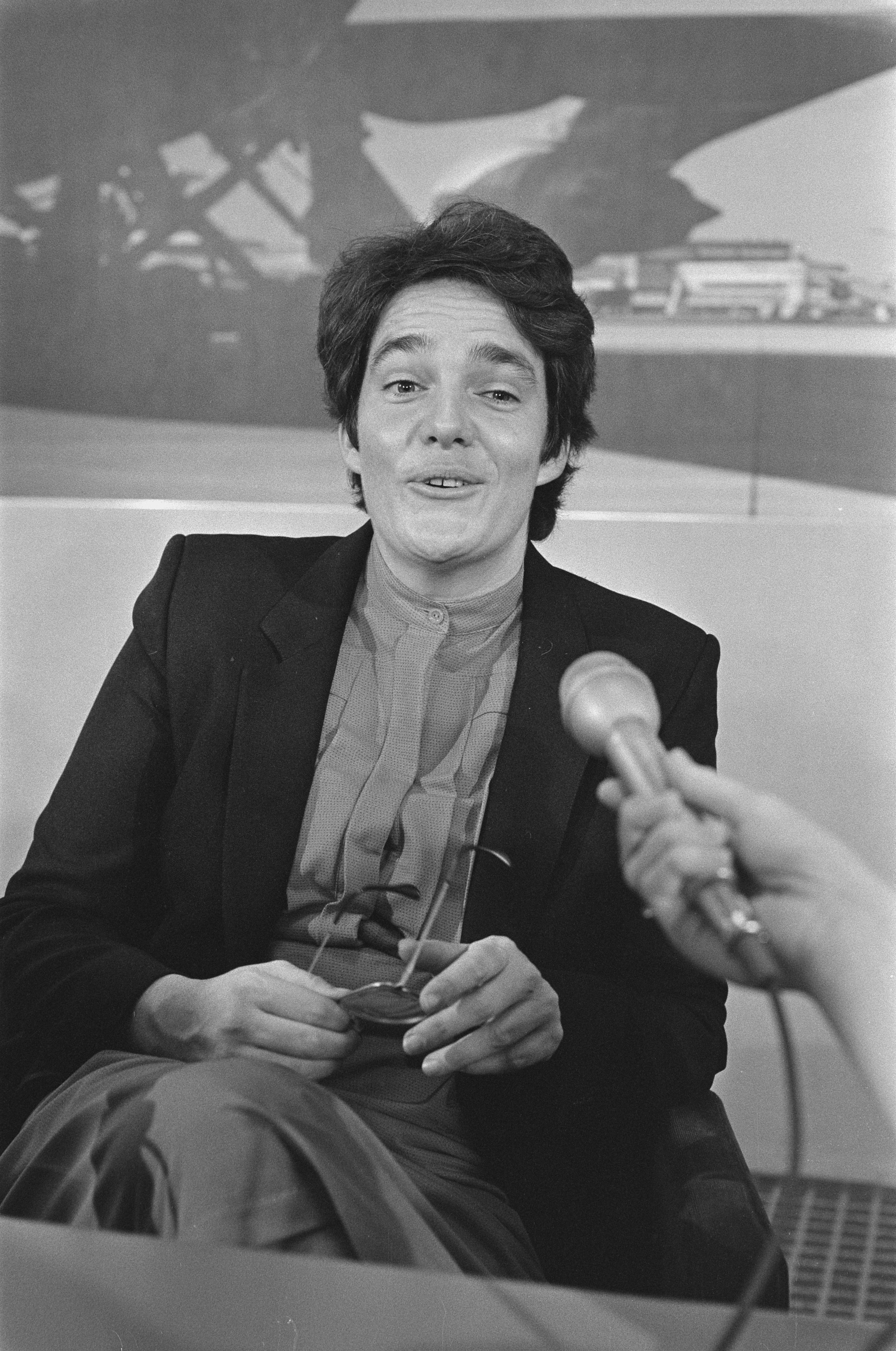
- Satchwell (1985)

Gauteng Division of the High Court

Personal details
- Education: Rhodes University

Kathleen Margaret "Kathie" Satchwell (born 6 September 1951) is a retired judge and human rights advocate. She served on the Gauteng Division of the High Court (formerly the South Gauteng High Court) in South Africa from 1996 and is recognised for her contributions to constitutional jurisprudence, gender equality, and the transformation of the South African judiciary. She is also known for her legal activism during the apartheid era and leadership of the Satchwell Commission in road accident compensation reform.

== Biography ==
Kathie was born in Birmingham, England, to South African parents Leslie Murray Satchwell, a thoracic surgeon, and Margaret Beaton, a nurse. The family returned to South Africa in the 1950s, settling in Port Elizabeth (now Gqeberha), where she was raised as the eldest of five children. She attended St Anne’s Convent School and St Dominic’s Priory.

She began her tertiary education at Rhodes University in 1969 and spent a year on the American Field Service programme in the United States. Upon her return to South Africa, Kathie became active in student politics and served as President of the Rhodes University Student Representative Council in 1971. She earned a BA and an Honours degree in Anthropology and isiXhosa, with a dissertation focused on the role of the “Umtshakazi”, meaning “young bride”, in traditional Xhosa families.

While at Rhodes, Kathie immediately registered with the National Union of South African Students (NUSAS) and participated in NUSAS activities and more confidential discussion groups and meetings. She participated in and organised public protests on anti-apartheid issues. She joined the Black Sash and convened and ran the Black Sash Advice Office part-time for two years.

In 1977, after Steve Biko's detention in Grahamstown (now Makhanda), Kathie established a support programme for his colleagues from the Eastern Cape who were detained in Grahamstown for indefinite periods.

Kathie commenced a Master’s in Anthropology and later obtained an LLB from the University of South Africa (UNISA). Her political activities during this time led to the denial of permits to reside and work in the Transkei, solidifying her resolve to pursue a legal career focused on social justice.

== Legal and Judicial Career ==
=== Early career ===
Kathie began her legal career in Johannesburg in 1979 when she commenced her articles with human rights attorney Raymond Tucker. She was involved in prominent political trials and worked with figures such as George Bizos, Sydney Kentridge and Dennis Kuny.

In 1981, Kathie established her own firm, representing numerous detainees, members of banned organisations and persons charged with treason, terrorism, offences under “security legislation” being the Terrorism Act, Internal Security Act and Emergency Regulations, and conscientious objectors prosecuted under the Defence Act. Kathie also represented trade unions and publications banned under publications legislation for criticising the apartheid regime, including Learn and Teach and Work in Progress. She was selected as one of six lawyers to represent prisoners on Robben Island during their demand for release in 1991.

Kathie handled civil, criminal, tax, and labour law cases. She chaired multiple commissions of inquiry and became a respected labour arbitrator. Many of her decisions are published in the IMSSA Arbitration Digest.

=== Judicial Appointment ===
In October 1996, President Nelson Mandela appointed Satchwell to the Transvaal Provincial Division of the High Court (now the Gauteng Division of the High Court of South Africa), becoming the first woman attorney appointed to that division. Her appointment marked a milestone in diversifying the judiciary.

During her tenure, Satchwell presided over various civil, criminal, tax, and labour matters. She also presided over several different courts, seated at the Gauteng Division of the High Court of South Africa (both Johannesburg and Pretoria), Western Cape Division of the High Court of South Africa (Cape Town), and the Tax Court in Johannesburg and Pretoria.

Satchwell’s judgments were noted for their legal innovation and progressive interpretation of constitutional principles, particularly on issues of equality, gender justice, and access to justice.

=== Notable Judgments and Contributions ===
Satchwell was an outspoken critic of the judiciary's complicity in apartheid. In 1996, Satchwell became the first and only High Court Judge to testify before the Truth and Reconciliation Commission (TRC) in her personal capacity, highlighting the legal system’s failure to uphold and protect human rights during the apartheid era. Notably, she also chose not to oppose an amnesty application brought by members of the South African Police’s Security Branch, who were implicated in the petrol bombing of her home.

In 1996, Satchwell delivered judgment in S v Sebejan, which addressed the constitutional rights of individuals classified as "suspects" during police investigations. Her ruling took a progressive stance by affirming that constitutional protections apply from the earliest stages of a criminal inquiry, even before formal arrest or detention. This judgment has since significantly shaped the interpretation of suspects' rights under South African constitutional law.

Satchwell, in Holtzauzen v Roodt, advocated for a more empathetic judicial approach to sexual violence cases. She emphasised the need for expert testimony in rape matters and cautioned against judges relying solely on personal assumptions.

In a notable 2005 domestic violence case, Satchwell drew national attention by sentencing a woman who had killed her abusive husband to five minutes in prison, a symbolic sentence recognising prolonged abuse and reflecting a trauma-informed approach to justice.

One of Satchwell’s most influential legal contributions was in Satchwell v President of the Republic of South Africa, where she challenged the Judges' Remuneration and Conditions of Employment Act for excluding same-sex partners from judicial benefits. In 2002, the Constitutional Court of South Africa ruled in her favour, finding that the law violated the Constitution’s equality clause. A follow-up ruling in 2003 extended these benefits to all same-sex partners in permanent, supportive relationships. This landmark ruling advanced LGBTQ+ rights in South Africa.

=== Road Accident Fund Commission ===
In 1999, President Nelson Mandela appointed Satchwell to chair the Commission of Inquiry into a new compensation system for road accident victims. The resulting Satchwell Commission Report, submitted to Parliament in 2003, comprised over 1,500 pages across 42 chapters. It addressed issues including fault-based liability, periodic compensation, medical and rehabilitation services, and social security integration. The report remains a key document in South Africa's personal injury compensation policy.

== Post-Retirement Activities ==
After retiring from the bench in October 2016, Satchwell continued to engage in public service and legal reform. Satchwell continued to preside over the Tax Court as an acting judge for 18 months during 2017 and 2018 and to serve as an acting judge, implementing changes to the civil practice motion court in Johannesburg between 2018 and 2019.

Satchwell’s post-retirement activities include arbitrating disputes and serving on several commissions of inquiry. In 2018, she chaired an inquiry into sexual harassment at the NGO Equal Education.

Between 2019 and 2021, Satchwell chaired an independent inquiry into media ethics commissioned by the South African National Editors’ Forum (SANEF). The inquiry scrutinised the role of journalists and media independence and concluded that Minister Gwede Mantashe had shown "executive contempt" for the media.

Satchwell aided in assessing evidence and drafting preliminary chapters for Chief Justice Raymond Zondo’s Commission of Inquiry into Allegations of State Capture, Corruption and Fraud.

== Awards, Honours, Memberships and Recognitions ==
- Doctor of Laws (honoris causa), Rhodes University (2010)
- Distinguished Alumni Award, Rhodes University (2019)
- Trustee, Nelson Mandela Children’s Fund
- Visiting Scholar at the Centre for Socio-Legal Studies, University of Oxford (2004)
- Visiting Fellow, Wolfson College, University of Oxford (2004)
- Member, Management Committee of the Nelson Mandela Children’s Fund
- Member, People Opposing Women Abuse (POWA)
- Trustee, RAITH Foundation 2001 to date
- Trustee, Human Rights Commission Trust
- Chairperson, Human Rights Commission Trust
- Member, Judicial Education Sub-Committee of the Judicial Service Commission

== Personal life ==
Kathie’s life partner was Lesley Louise Carnelley, a trainer, coach, businesswoman, property consultant, and mother of two daughters. They married in 2007, following the legalisation of same-sex marriage in South Africa. Lesley passed away at the end of 2018.

In her personal time, Kathie has pursued a passionate interest in the history of the First World War. She has conducted extensive research into the lives of individual soldiers who were killed during the war, often focusing on those named on war memorials. Her research includes locating family, educational, and employment records and visiting their graves and the battlefields of France and Belgium. She has self-published works, including For the Glory of God and the Empire, Your Loving Son, Yum and A Burnt Sacrifice.

Additionally, she has taught annual week-long courses on the Great War at the University of Cape Town’s Summer School, covering each year of the conflict. She also edited a collection of course attendees’ personal and family war-time contributions.

== Judgments and Publications ==
- S v Sebejan 1997 (1) SACR 626 (W)
- Holtzauzen v Roodt 1997 (4) SA 766 (W)
- S v Bresler and Another 2002 (2) SACR 18 (C)
- Esterhuizen v Swanepoel and Sixteen Other Cases 2004 (4) SA 89 (W)
- Moolla v Director of Public Prosecutions and Others [2012] ZAGPJHC (23 March 2012)
- Theobald v Alliance Mining Corporation Ltd (in liquidation) (Case No 24874/2013) Johannesburg High Court, 14 October 2015
- Standard Bank of South Africa Limited v Gas 2 Liquids (Pty) Limited [2016] ZAGPJHC 38 (10 March 2016)
