= March and March =

South African civic organisation

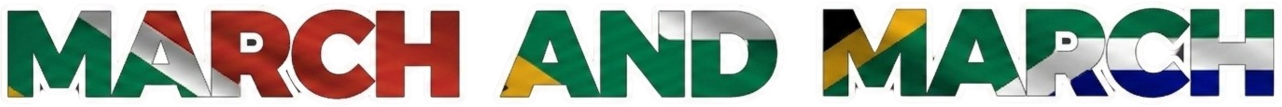
- Formation: March 2024
- Founder: Jacinta Ngobese-Zuma
- Type: Civic movement / advocacy group
- Purpose: Immigration policy advocacy and citizen mobilisation in South Africa
- Headquarters: Durban, KwaZulu-Natal, South Africa
- Region served: South Africa
- Members: 50,000+ supporters (claimed)
- Founder and leader: Jacinta Ngobese-Zuma
- Key people: Provincial coordinators; Communications team
- Affiliations: Various civic organisations (informal cooperation only)
- Budget: Crowdfunded through donations, merchandise sales, and public contributions
- Website: marchandmarch.org.za

March and March (established in March 2024) is a South African civic organisation focused on illegal immigration. The movement is associated with Operation Dudula and Patriotic Alliance's call of deporting illegal and undocumented immigrants, using the slogan Abahambe (They must go) during demonstrations. In 2026, their demonstrations and protests have spread nationwide and have been linked to a number of xenophobic and violent actions against foreigners.

The March and March first gained prominence in South African and international news media in 2025, when they stationed themselves at public health facilities in KwaZulu-Natal. The movement stationed volunteers outside government clinics and hospitals and focussed on gatekeeping. This occurred at Addington Hospital, R. K Khan Hospital and others public health care facilities. Volunteers insisted that an ID document should be shown in order to gain entry.

At the beginning of 2026, the leadership announced the end of their campaign of gatekeeping clinics and hospitals; and organised a number of anti-illegal immigration protests across the country sparking the 2026 anti-illegal immigrant movement in South Africa and imposing a '30 June' deadline. Focus then shifted to protesting outside Addington Primary school with MK and Operation Dudula collaborating.

At the end of March 2026, the movement organised a protest against the coronation of a Nigerian who was crowned the Igwe Ndigbo at KuGompo city in the Eastern Cape. Former radio presenter Ngizwe Mchunu, traditional leaders, civic movements and political parties including ActionSA, and the Patriotic Alliance, joined the demonstration, condemning the ceremony as unlawful. The demonstrations turned violent with cars and shops of foreign nationals being torched with fire.

== Leadership ==
March and March is a registered as a non-profit organisation and is led by Jacinta Ngobese-Zuma. Mrs Ngobese-Zuma is award winning former radio personality who worked as a radio presenter on Vuma FM. She was dismissed without reasons from the station in 2025. It was initially characterised as a citizen led group in Durban, addressing state failures. As the organisation grew, the group began to focus on illegal migrants and their contribution to South Africa's current challenges. Critics and other commentators have argued that state policy on border control, service delivery and crime are also factors.

The organisation has branches in several provinces, and in April and May 2026, March and March organised demonstrations against undocumented migrants in Pretoria, Johannesburg and Durban. Reports state that at least two Nigerian men were killed in separate incidents in Johannesburg during this period.

Another civic activist and leader of Insizwa Nobunsizwa Development Foundation, Nkosikhona Ndabandaba, also known as Phakel’umthakathi, who has joined and led demonstrations organised by March and March, said “We do not advocate for any violence against our brothers and sisters from other countries. All we want is for them to come into our country legally and that they must not feed our children drugs or commit all sorts of crimes.”

The organisation claims to be apolitical but has been linked to the uMkhonto weSizwe (MK) political party.

=== 30 June deadline and protests ===
March and March affiliate and leader of Insizwa nobunsizwa Nkosikhona Ndabandaba, issued a deadline for all foreigners in South Africa to leave. The date of 30th of June 2026 was first issued in 7 December 2025, as a six months notice to allow them to prepare for departure. The deadline caused panic among refugee communities and civil society groups. Early June, thousands of Malawian nationals started gathering at Sherwood Park in Durban out of fear of being attacked. Illegal immigrants from Zimbabwe also began flocking to The Zimbabwean Consulate in Cape Town, hoping to leave South Africa before 30 June.

The uncertainty of what was going to happen on 30 June spread fear and rumours around the country. The South African Government responded by announcing a R600-million (36.4 million US dollars) spending to protect people and mitigate against potential violence. The Acting Police Minister Firoz Cachalia revealed that R600 million has been redirected from South African Police Service (SAPS) to ensure operational readiness ahead of the planned nationwide demonstrations on June 30th.

On the appointed day of 30 June, more than 20 civic groups were part of protests organised in all provinces of South Africa. According to Mail and Guardian "The demonstrations were largely peaceful, with marchers accompanied by police officers throughout the day." Huge crowds of demonstrators were seen in cities like Johannesburg, Durban, KuGompo, Bloemfontein, Pretoria and Cape Town, while smaller crowds were seen in towns like Hermanus, Gqeberha, Kroonstad, Zeerust, Tzaneen, Thohoyandou and Kimberley, with isolated incidents of intimidation and violence. In Hillbrow, three Nigerians were arrested after shooting at protesters, wounding a 17 year old. Marches were also seen in townships like Thembisa, Soweto, Thokoza, Tsakane, EMalahleni and Nquthu. The total number of nationwide protests is reported to be 120, with 108 being peaceful, while 12 had incidents of violence.

== Controversies and incidents ==
=== Jacinta Ngobese Zuma ===
==== Addington Primary School violence ====
On January 21, 2026, the group March and March, Operation Dudula and supporters of the MK Party, protested outside Addington Primary School in Durban. They called for South African children to be given priority in school admission. The protest turned violent when the police attempted to stop the demonstration, and there are reports of parents being assaulted during clashes.

==== 2026 SAFM interview ====
During a June 2026 SAFM interview, Jacinta made multiple serious allegations against many people and organizations. Those allegations included that 60% of serious crimes in Gauteng were committed by foreign nationals and that foreign-funded NGOs were using money to purchase weapons. She also claimed that bombs and explosives were entering South Africa, that foreign military bases were operating in South Africa and foreign nationals were avoiding prosecution by paying police officers.

==== Immigrants seeking refuge at the Diakoni Centre ====
In May 2026, there were an estimated 300 immigrants that had fled to the Diakoni Centre in Durban. The immigrants claimed that they feared for their lives due to the anti-immigration protests that were occurring. The police put up a barrier so that the people who supported March and March could not get near the immigrants. The incident was brought into question whether the group described their activities as nonviolent protest regarding the issue of immigration enforcement.

==== Targeting a journalist during a protest ====
Jacinta Ngobese Zuma spoke in front of the Department of Home Affairs Refugee Reception Center on October 27, 2026 where there was a gathering of about 50 people. In her speech, Jacinta identified GroundUp reporter Joseph Bracken, who had been recording the event, and called him a "white journalist" while criticizing GroundUp's reporting of the March.

=== March and March ===
In an urgent application prompted by civil disturbances linked to March and March anti-immigration demonstrations in Durban, the Durban High Court heard the case of Acting Police Minister Firoz Cachalia, and Regional Police Commissioner Lieutenant-General Nhlanhla Mkhwanazi on 30 October 2026.The authorities referred to the proposed allegations of assault, harassment and intimidation of residents, business owners, traders and delivery drivers. Crime such as looting, property damage, the forced close the businesses, and the prevention of access to buildings, including the Department of Home Affairs Refugee Reception Centre was also highlighted.

On 30 October, the court gave an interim order for the movement March and March to continue to protest under certain restraints. The order limited protests to designated routes between 9 a.m. and 3 p.m. The police as well imposed certain restrictions on weapons, face coverings and behaviour during demonstrations.

A rule nisi was issued by the court finding that the leaders of the march and other respondents be at risk of an eventual interdict until they give a reason why it should not be granted. That matter was due back in court on 18 January, 2027.

== See also ==
- Xenophobia in South Africa
