= Manuel Josias Sithole =

Mozambican immigrant (??–2015)

Manuel Josias Sithole, commonly known as Emmanuel Sithole, was a Mozambican immigrant who was brutally stabbed to death on 18 April 2015 on second street in Alexandra Township, Johannesburg. James Oatway and Beauregard Tromp were taking pictures and reporting on break ins and looting of shops associated with xenophobic violence that began at the end of March in Gauteng.

== 2008 Background ==
Seven years prior, on the in May 2008, Alexandra Township had been transformed into a War Zone In a wave of attacks, looting and arson followed across townships with 62 people dying, 342 looted shops, 213 burnt down and widespread displacement. The deployment of the SANDF was approved on 15 May 2008. Thabo Mbeki's response was to deny that the violence was xenophobic and attributed the actions to township crime. In the aftermath, the state was criticised both for its inadequate response, its lack of a co-ordinated response and for creating conditions where in the crisis took place.

== 2015 Hostility toward African migrants ==
Towards the end of March, 2015, Xenophobic violence began brewing in Gauteng cities and "corrective violence” (vigilantism) saw black South Africans taking the law into their hands and justifying looting and discrimination by referring to a desire to address crime and drug abuse. Scepticism about the effectiveness of police (and their neutrality) and the capability of state institutions, was again expressed.

== Effects of the image ==
A series of photographs about the Sithole's murder, taken by photojournalist Oatway, dominated the collective memory. The photos gave the target of violence “a face, a name, a life and a personality” While the perpetrators of Sithole's murder were punished, the pattern of xenophobia denialism with the state's insistence on criminality or the displacement of responsibility onto a "third force"

Following Sithole's murder, Minister Nosiviwe Mapisa Nqakula announced that the South African National Defence Force would be deployed to “volatile areas", Operation Fiela (meaning ‘sweep’ in Sesotho) would raid hostels, churches, and apartment buildings looking for more undocumented migrants.
