= 2026 anti-immigrant movement and xenophobia in South Africa =

2026 anti-immigrant movement in South Africa
- Part of Xenophobia in South Africa
- Date: January 2026 – present
- Location: South Africa
- Caused by: Opposition to illegal immigration, unemployment, economic inequality, concerns over crime
- Goals: Deportation of documented and undocumented immigrants, stricter immigration enforcement
- Methods: Demonstrations, protests, workplace inspections, community patrols, boycotts
- Status: Ongoing

Parties
Anti-immigrant groups	Foreign nationals and migrant communities

Lead figures
Leaders of Operation Dudula; Leaders of Put South Africans First; Leaders of March and March	Saad Kassis-Mohamed; Tedros Adhanom Ghebreyesus; Decentralized leadership

Casualties
- Deaths: 10+
- Injuries: Unknown

The 2026 anti-immigrant movement and xenophobia in South Africa is an ongoing series of protests, campaigns, demonstrations and incidents of violence directed against illegal and legal foreign nationals in South Africa. The movement intensified in 2026 amid concerns over unemployment, crime, illegal immigration and pressure on public services. Supporters have called for stricter immigration enforcement and the deportation of documented and undocumented migrants, while critics, including human rights organisations and labour unions, have characterized aspects of the movement as xenophobic.

The movement has been associated with organizations such as Operation Dudula, Put South Africans First and March and March. Demonstrations and attacks targeting illegal foreign nationals and foreign-owned businesses have been reported in several parts of the country, leading to the displacement of migrants and the voluntary repatriation of thousands of foreign nationals from countries including Malawi, Ghana, Mozambique, Nigeria and Zimbabwe.

== Background ==
Anti-immigrant sentiment in South Africa has periodically resulted in outbreaks of violence since the end of apartheid. Major episodes occurred in 2008 and 2015, resulting in deaths, injuries and the displacement of thousands of foreign nationals. Economic challenges, high unemployment and concerns over crime have contributed to recurring tensions regarding immigration.

During the early 2020s, organisations advocating stricter immigration controls gained prominence. Among these was Operation Dudula, founded in 2021, which campaigned against illegal immigration and demanded stronger enforcement of immigration laws.

A poll by the Human Sciences Research Council conducted in 2025 showed that one in six adults said they would welcome all foreigners and 42% said they would welcome none, marking a sharp rise in anti-immigrant sentiment. A 2025 Afrobarometer survey also showed that eight out of every ten South Africans believed that immigrants have a "negative" impact on the economy and an Ipsos poll found that nearly 75% of all respondents did not trust African immigrants "at all".

== Causes ==
Observers and analysts have attributed the rise of the movement to South Africa's high unemployment rate, economic inequality, public concerns over crime, competition for jobs and housing, and dissatisfaction with government institutions. Supporters of the movement have argued that illegal immigration has increased pressure on public services and employment opportunities, while critics have accused anti-immigrant activists of scapegoating migrants for broader socioeconomic problems.

== History ==
=== Early developments ===
Anti-immigrant activism increased during the early 2020s with the emergence of grassroots organisations and social media campaigns. Groups such as Operation Dudula and Put South Africans First called for stricter border controls and the removal of undocumented migrants from the country.

=== Escalation in 2026 ===
Anti-foreigner protests across South Africa between April and June 2026. Numbered chronologically.

Anti-immigrant protests intensified across South Africa during the first half of 2026, led by groups such as March and March and supported by members of the opposition party ActionSA. Demonstrators organised marches and community campaigns in several cities, with calling for the removal of migrants. Protesters called for the deportation of undocumented migrants and set 30 June as a deadline for foreigners without legal status to leave the country.

Notable anti-foreigner protests during this period includes protests in the cities of Durban (17 and 21 April and 6 May), Johannesburg (19 April), Bloemfontein (25 and 26 May), Botshabelo (26 May), Estcourt (29 May), Mossel Bay (30 May), Kleinmond (31 May), Gansbaai (1 June), Benoni (2 and 6 June), Vanderbijlpark (2 June), Witbank (4 June), Humansdorp (8 June), Boksburg (8 and 23 June), Goodwood (2 June) and Wynberg (21 June).

As tensions increased, thousands of foreign nationals, particularly Malawians living in KwaZulu-Natal, fled their homes and gathered in temporary camps or sought protection at government facilities. Aid organisations provided food, blankets and other assistance to displaced migrants. Reports emerged of intimidation, threats and attacks against foreign nationals and foreign-owned businesses, raising fears of a repeat of the xenophobic violence that occurred in 2008, 2015, 2016 and 2019.

The protests took place against a backdrop of high unemployment, economic inequality and pressure on public services. Supporters of the movement argued that undocumented immigration contributed to competition for jobs, housing and healthcare, while critics accused anti-immigrant groups of scapegoating migrants for broader socioeconomic challenges. Social media videos and online campaigns further contributed to tensions and attracted diplomatic concern from several African countries.

President Cyril Ramaphosa condemned acts of vigilantism and warned that no individual or organization had the authority to demand proof of nationality from members of the public. The government announced measures aimed at addressing illegal immigration, including reforms to the asylum system, expanded use of digital identification systems and tougher penalties for employers found to be exploiting undocumented migrants.

=== Violence and displacement ===
==== Durban ====
Reports of attacks against foreign nationals increased during the protests, with incidents of looting, destruction of businesses and displacement being recorded in several parts of the country. Many of those affected were long-term residents, including individuals who had spent most or all of their lives in South Africa and possessed legal documentation. Victims included migrants from Ghana, the Democratic Republic of the Congo, Mozambique and other African countries.

In Durban, hundreds of displaced migrants sought refuge outside offices of the Department of Home Affairs and police stations after being unable to return to their homes. Some migrants alleged that they had been denied access to shelters and accused police of forcibly dispersing displaced groups, allegations denied by law enforcement authorities. Police officials stated that no tear gas or rubber bullets had been used and urged victims of attacks to formally report incidents.

The unrest contributed to growing fears among migrant communities ahead of a 30 June deadline announced by anti-immigration activists for undocumented foreigners to leave the country. The protests, organised by the group March and March, were accompanied by incidents of violence, including the looting of foreign-owned businesses and attacks on homes. The organisation denied responsibility for the violence and rejected accusations of xenophobia, arguing that its campaign was directed at illegal immigration and government policy rather than foreign nationals themselves.

The violence displaced thousands of migrants and strained South Africa's relations with several African countries. Analysts attributed the tensions to economic hardship, competition over employment and public services, and the use of anti-immigration rhetoric in the run-up to the country's 2026 local elections. However, some political leaders rejected claims that electoral politics had contributed to the unrest, instead blaming longstanding failures in migration management.

==== Western Cape ====
Violence linked to anti-immigrant protests was reported in Mossel Bay in the Western Cape in late May 2026. The unrest, reportedly triggered by allegations that undocumented migrants were being employed by local construction companies, resulted in deaths, injuries and the destruction of informal settlements. Local authorities reported that dozens of dwellings had been burned and families displaced. South African police confirmed the deaths of two Mozambican nationals and a South African teenager, while the Mozambican government stated that five of its citizens had been killed in xenophobic attacks and that two others had died in a road accident while returning home. The discrepancy in casualty figures contributed to diplomatic tensions between the two countries.

The violence prompted the Mozambican government to repatriate hundreds of its citizens from South Africa, while several other African countries, including Ghana and Nigeria, initiated or announced plans to assist nationals wishing to return home. Thousands of migrants sought refuge in temporary shelters or at government facilities amid fears of further attacks. Governments including those of Kenya, Lesotho, Malawi and Zimbabwe advised their citizens residing in South Africa to exercise caution.

Reports of vigilante groups demanding proof of legal status from foreign nationals and forcing the closure of businesses owned by migrants drew criticism from South African authorities, which stated that such actions had no official sanction. The unrest raised concerns about a recurrence of previous waves of xenophobic violence and occurred against the backdrop of campaigning ahead of the 2026 local government elections.

Anti-immigrant unrest also spread to several towns in the Western Cape during late May and early June 2026, resulting in the displacement of hundreds of migrants from countries including Malawi and Mozambique. In towns such as Kleinmond reports emerged of groups going door-to-door demanding that foreign nationals leave, prompting many migrants to flee their homes and seek shelter in community halls, temporary facilities and remote areas.

The unrest occurred amid renewed debate over immigration policy and growing concerns over unemployment, crime and economic hardship. Critics argued that migrants had become scapegoats for broader socioeconomic challenges, while President Cyril Ramaphosa called for measures to address irregular migration and simultaneously condemned xenophobic violence.

== Government response and analysis ==
As anti-immigrant protests intensified in June 2026, the South African government shifted from facilitating voluntary repatriations to implementing stricter deportation procedures. In Durban, where thousands of Malawian nationals had gathered at temporary transit camps seeking repatriation, local authorities established additional facilities and coordinated transport for those returning to Malawi. The Department of Justice also introduced virtual court proceedings and announced plans for dedicated courts to accelerate the processing of immigration-related cases.

The government's response prompted debate among political analysts, some of whom argued that the measures represented a reaction to mounting public pressure rather than a long-term solution to South Africa's migration challenges. Analysts Ralph Mathekga and Oscar van Heerden contended that years of weak border management and broader socioeconomic difficulties had contributed to the crisis, warning that the growing influence of anti-immigration movements posed risks to political stability and state authority.

Several commentators argued that anti-immigrant sentiment was being exploited by political actors ahead of the 2026 local government elections, although others maintained that failures in migration management were the principal cause of public frustration. The Economic Freedom Fighters, under the leadership of Julius Malema, maintained its pan-Africanist position and opposed anti-immigrant rhetoric despite concerns over its electoral impact.

Analysts further argued that migration pressures affecting South Africa were linked to economic and political difficulties elsewhere in the Southern African region, particularly in Zimbabwe. According to Statistics South Africa, approximately three million international migrants resided in the country in 2026, the majority originating from member states of the Southern African Development Community.

Observers warned that a proposed national shutdown by anti-immigration groups could disrupt informal trade networks, exacerbate existing economic difficulties and damage South Africa's international reputation. Concerns were also raised regarding the country's relations with neighbouring states and its standing within the Southern African Development Community.

President Cyril Ramaphosa rejected attempts to blame migrants for South Africa's economic and social challenges, stating that poverty, unemployment and inequality required long-term solutions and reiterating that the enforcement of immigration laws remained the responsibility of the state. He also condemned xenophobia and other forms of intolerance and emphasised that no individual or organisation had the authority to assume the functions of law enforcement.

In July 2026, the Nigerian government announced that the country will seek compensation from South Africa for its citizens who left the country. Nigeria's acting high commissioner to South Africa, Alexander Temitope Ajayi, also stated that the Nigerian government had started documenting businesses and properties left by Nigerian immigrants.

== Organisations ==
Several organisations and pressure groups have been associated with the movement. Operation Dudula, established in 2021, advocates stricter immigration controls and has denied promoting xenophobic violence. Put South Africans First has campaigned for increased employment opportunities and access to public services for South African citizens and has supported the deportation of undocumented migrants. March and March emerged as one of the groups participating in demonstrations and anti-immigrant campaigns during 2026.

== Ideology ==
The movement has been associated with opposition to illegal immigration, economic nationalism and populism. Critics have argued that elements of the movement have promoted xenophobia and the scapegoating of migrants, while supporters have maintained that their campaigns are aimed at enforcing immigration laws and prioritizing the interests of South African citizens.

== See also ==
- Opposition to immigration
- Protests in South Africa
- Racism in South Africa
- Xenophobia in South Africa
