= Nhlanhla Lux =

South African political activist

Nhlanhla "Lux" Dlamini, also Nhlanhla Mohlauli, is a South African activist, pilot and anti-immigrant activist and former leader of Operation Dudula, a nationalist party and group based in Soweto, South Africa. In 2022 he was arrested for house break-in and stealing. He was later arrested and convicted of theft of which he was ordered to pay back the R9500 he stole.

Nhlanhla said that his home in Soweto was damaged by a bomb during the riots of the 2023 South African National Shutdown.

== See also ==
- Xenophobia in South Africa
