= Immigration to South Africa =

South Africa experiences a relatively high influx of immigration annually. As of 2019, the number of immigrants entering the country continues to increase, the majority of whom are working residents and hold great influence over the continued presence of several sectors throughout South Africa. The demographic background of these migrant groups is very diverse, with many of the countries of origin belonging to nations throughout sub-saharan Africa. A portion of them have qualified as refugees since the 1990s.

According to the United Nations, there is also an additional, yet considerable, Indian, Bangladeshi, and Pakistani diaspora in South Africa, many of whom had arrived in South Africa during the 1990s seeking business opportunities and greater economic stability. The abolishment of the discriminatory Apartheid system, as well as subsequent migrant policy changes and social reform that took place during that period only helped to facilitate the influx.

The current immigration policy taken up by the South African government is aimed at maintaining the status quo, although the immigration rate has historically been something the South African government has attempted to decrease. Certain immigration laws have shifted since the end of apartheid, but some provisions of the mid-to-late twentieth century are still in effect, and xenophobic attitudes remain prevalent.

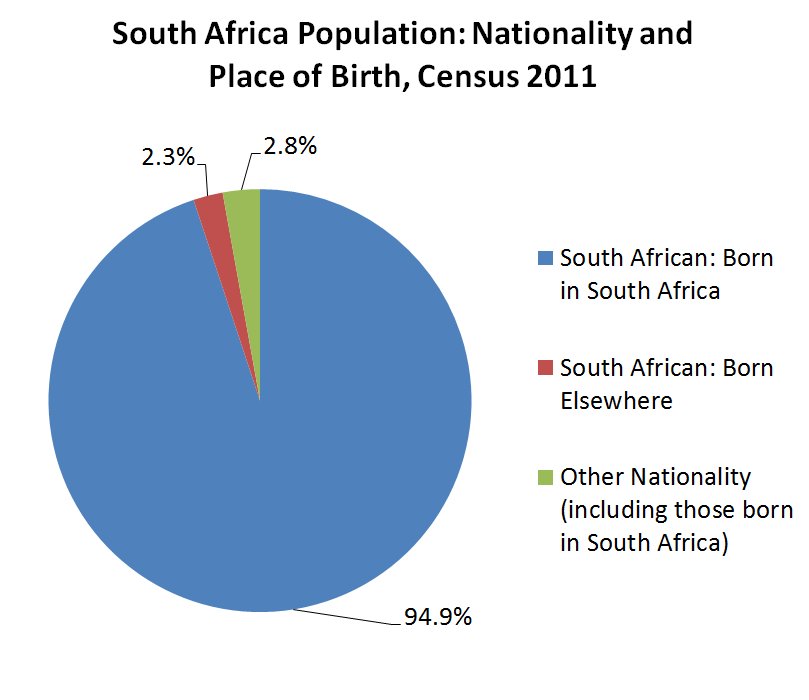
Population of South Africa By Nationality and Place of Birth

== Immigration Facts and Figures ==
The rate of female immigration has been expanding since post-colonialism. Themost present age groups among both male and female migrants range from 25 to 34 and 35–44.

The highest levels of remittances received from South Africa are respectively in Mozambique, Lesotho, Eswatini, Botswana, and Malawi. Immigrants tend to be more highly skilled than non-foreign populations. However, it is common for a highly-skilled worker to be limited to low-skilled work upon immigrating to South Africa. The most common sectors immigrants work in are casual work, restaurants (hospitality), manufacturing, and construction. Around 10 percent of this group is unemployed, which is significantly lower than the average unemployment rate of South Africans. Research has consistently found that immigrants in South Africa experience lower unemployment rates than the South African-born population. Earlier research by Sibanda (2008) found that approximately 10% of immigrants were unemployed and that immigrants were concentrated in sectors such as hospitality, manufacturing, construction and casual labour. More recent analysis, using South African census data, found that naturalised immigrants and foreign nationals generally engage more successfully with the labour market than locals on average.

The 2014 HSBC Expat Experience Report ranked South Africa 14th in their league table based on expat experiences.

Black Africans compose about 79.6% (2007 est.) of the population and represent different ethnic groups, including Zulu, Xhosa, Ndebele, Tsonga, Venda, Pedi, Sotho, Tswana and Swazi, as well as recent immigrants from other parts of Africa (particularly Zimbabwe, Nigeria and Democratic Republic of Congo). Whites compose 9.1% (2007 est), being the descendants of Dutch, French, British, Irish, and German settlers who began arriving at the Cape from the mid- to late 17th century, immigrants from Europe who arrived in South Africa in the twentieth century, and Portuguese who left the former Portuguese colonies of southern Africa (Angola and Mozambique) after their independence in the mid-1970s. Coloureds (8.8%, 2007 est) are mixed-race people primarily descended from the earliest settlers, their slaves, and the indigenous peoples. The remaining 2.4% are categorized as 'Indian/Asian', including the descendants of Indian indentured sugar estate workers and traders who came to South Africa in the mid-19th (particularly around Natal), as well as a few Chinese South Africans (approximately 250,000 - 350,000).

Immigration assumptions by Statistics South Africa to South Africa based on race. Negative numbers represent net migration from South Africa to other countries.

Year	African	Asian	White
1985–2000	635 275	14 476	-304 112
2001–2005	769 038	23 335	-133 782
2006-2010	922 885	34 688	-112 046
2011–2015	1 067 936	40 929	-95 158

== Countries of Origin ==
The origins of many South African immigrants come from countries throughout the African continent, including, but not limited to: Angola, Botswana, Democratic Republic of the Congo, Ethiopia, Eswatini, Kenya, Malawi, Mozambique, Namibia, Nigeria, Somalia, Sudan, Tanzania, Zambia, and Zimbabwe. Most immigrants to South Africa originate from the neighboring countries of Botswana, Eswatini, Lesotho, Mozambique, and Zimbabwe. The spike in the number of immigrants in the mid-1980s can be attributed to a high demand for mine labor. In the 1990s, the RENAMO War in Mozambique caused an influx of migration into South Africa, and in modern times this particular group is often granted refugee status. In 2008, many work permit holders came from Kenya, Nigeria and Zimbabwe, and the majority of asylum-seekers hailed from Somalia.

Source: United Nations (2020)
Total foreign-born	2,860,495
Place of birth	Population
Zimbabwe	690,243
Mozambique	350,463
Lesotho	192,008
Malawi	94,119
United Kingdom	67,382
DR Congo	63,892
Somalia	58,491
Botswana	50,475
Angola	47,945
Eswatini	45,435
Ethiopia	44,181
Namibia	36,671
Nigeria	36,210
India	29,935
Italy	28,122
Congo	23,713
Zambia	22,901
Kenya	19,901
Germany	16,595
Bangladesh	15,565
Ireland	14,582
Pakistan	13,325
Poland	11,900
Portugal	11,861
Tanzania	11,544
Greece	10,878
Mauritius	10,243
Netherlands	10,186
Belgium	9,577
France	9,124
Ghana	8,034
Burundi	7,894
United States	7,429
China	6,914
Canada	6,859
Austria	6,495
Cyprus	5,918
Uganda	5,852
Australia	5,771
Rwanda	5,690
Egypt	5,564
Israel	5,382

== Immigration Law and Policy ==
The Aliens Control Act of 1991 (ACA) is one of the last policies implemented by the apartheid regime of South Africa. It served to determine the flow of immigration into South Africa, transitioning from exclusive to selective immigration in times of high labor demands, and to induce stricter enforcement of immigration law. The policy has been critiqued internationally as a source of mass human rights violations and unconstitutionality, including minimal due process in entry, search, and arrest. The Act characterizes and considers all migrants, including refugees and asylum-seekers, as "illegal aliens."

The apartheid's general stance on immigration policy can be suggested through four major actions on programming: racist policy and legislation, exploitation of migrant labor from bordering countries, strict enforcement of legislation, and dismissal of refugee conventions of the United Nations (UN). Legislation continuously used religious or racial quotas to determine inflow and isolate certain groups from immigrating. Preferred immigrants were white Europeans or highly skilled workers. The apartheid followed a "two-gates policy" to restrict permanent residency and issue labor contracts that would ensure the eventual return migration of mining and commercial farming workers. Stricter enforcement targeted refugees from Mozambique, and "Operation Sentry" effectively deported about 47,000 of this group in 1991. Further legislation upgraded a penalty for harboring undocumented migrants to five years imprisonment, and law enforcement carried out several raids on informal settlements of migrants from Mozambique. Backed by the ACA, the apartheid government rejected language of policies introduced at international refugee conventions, essentially viewing asylum-seekers as migrants having illegally entered and settled in South Africa.

The post-apartheid regime introduced a new framework on immigration through programs such as the Reconstruction and Development Plan; Growth, Employment, Redistribution; the 1996 Presidential Commission to Investigate Labour Market Policy. While these policies dismantled the racist legislation of the previous government, the newly empowered government has been criticized for not removing the ACA and condemning the associated xenophobia which has trickled into contemporary public opinion. Since 1994, the following regimes have in fact used the ACA to implement strict immigration measures. However, in general, immigration policy was reduced in restrictiveness by 60.4% between 1994 and 2014. The post-apartheid government did approve a one-time reparation for victims of previous immigration laws deemed racist. It also implemented three amnesty policies between 1995 and 1996, benefiting mine-workers, migrants with over five years of uninterrupted residency in South Africa, and Mozambican refugees who arrived before 1992. The regime adopted an acceptance towards the UN Refugee Conventions and made South Africa a signatory in 1995. The government passed the Refugee Act of 1998, which lacked specific language to determine the status of refugee, reflecting some public disapproval which has considered refugees as falsely-posing economic migrants. As of 2015, the government's stance on immigration policy has been to maintain existing levels and rates, however, during the previous ten years it aimed to reduce the numbers of immigrants present and moving into South Africa.

South Africa's contemporary immigration framework is governed by the Immigration Act, 2002 (Act 13 of 2002), as amended, which regulates admission, residence and departure."Immigration Act 13 of 2002 (consolidated)" (PDF). SAFLII. 28 March 2025."Immigration Act 13 of 2002". gov.za.

The principal Act has been amended by the Immigration Amendment Act 3 of 2007, the Immigration Amendment Act 13 of 2011 and the Immigration Amendment Act 8 of 2016."Immigration Amendment Act 3 of 2007" (PDF). SAFLII. 18 July 2007."Immigration Amendment Act 13 of 2011" (PDF). gov.za. 26 August 2011."Immigration Amendment Act 8 of 2016". gov.za. 27 September 2016.

Implementation is detailed in the Immigration Regulations, 2014 (GN R413 in GG 37679 of 22 May 2014), which replaced earlier regulations and have since been amended, including in 2018 (GN R1328 in GG 42071 of 29 Nov 2018) and further regulatory updates in 2024."Immigration Regulations, 2014" (PDF). Department of Home Affairs. 22 May 2014."Immigration Act: Regulations: Amendment (2018)" (PDF). gov.za. 29 November 2018."Immigration Act: Regulations: Second Amendment (2024)" (PDF). gov.za. 28 March 2024.

From October 2024 the department introduced a points-based system for work visas by Government Notice (replacing an earlier version issued the same month) and finalized a remote-work (digital nomad) visa framework; digitisation measures continue.

Policy direction is also set out in the White Paper on Citizenship, Immigration and Refugee Protection (Government Gazette 50530, 17 Apr 2024).

== Depictions of Immigrants ==
The post-apartheid government misquoted the number of undocumented immigrants at 9 million; the actual number was closer to 500,000. They also increased deportations by 75%, deporting 600,000 between 1994 and 2000, 84% of this group having previously arrived as refugees. Deportations were used as indicators of crime reduction in mass media to portray law enforcement as more effective. This reinforced a common assumption that lasted through later years and was upheld by the comments of public officials, such as President Nelson Mandela, which associated immigrants with crime. However, immigrants in South Africa are more often victims of crime than perpetrators. Ministers and other officials have been cited blaming undocumented immigrants for lack of resources, in addition to crime.

Common stereotypes placed on immigrants in South Africa can be associated with jobs, wages, and resource competition South Africans relate to immigration. There has been some evidence that the presence of undocumented immigrants does lessen the work opportunities of South Africa-born residents, due to this group being willing or forced to work for much lower wages. High unemployment has also been assumed to be driven by exhaustion of jobs by immigrants, although there is limited evidence to support this. "Otherness" is an indicator of xenophobia in South Africa, and some researchers believe that the racial otherness perpetrated by apartheid was replaced by otherness of foreigners. Cultural stereotyping has increased with higher levels of immigration since the early 2000s, as well as greater exposure to immigrants hailing from a wider scope of nations. Confusion over political and civic rights has also been associated with the presence of xenophobia in South Africa.

== Permits and Visas ==
The South Africa Immigration Act distinguishes between visas (short or long-term) and a permanent residence permits.

Long-term visas: A foreigner must identify a visa that he/she is eligible to apply for and that is consistent with the activities he/she intends to conduct in South Africa.

- A foreigner who wishes to work must qualify for a work category visa
- A foreigner who intends studying in South Africa must apply for a study visa.
- Volunteering is considered an activity and a long-term visitor visa with volunteering endorsement must be applied for and granted for this purpose.
- A foreigner who intends to conduct a business he/she owns and to be actively involved in the business' daily activities whilst in South Africa can only do so if in possession of a business visa.
- Foreign spouses (by marriage or life-partnership) of a South African citizen or permanent resident can apply for a spousal based visa.
- Spouses and children of long-term visa holders can apply for long-term visitor visas to accompany their family member in South Africa.
- Foreigners wishing to retire in South Africa, may apply for a retired person visa either on the basis of receipt of pensions and/or irrevocable annuities or on the basis of demonstrating ownership of a combination of assets realising monthly income. The amount of the pension or income necessary to qualify for a retired person visa is determined by the Minister of Home Affairs and published in the Government Gazette.

Unless exceptional circumstances as Regulated apply, the holder of a visitor visa (short or long-term) cannot apply for a change of status to any other visa category from within South Africa. Foreigners are required to apply for their first long-term visas from their country of origin or ordinary residence. On 28 June 2019, a landmark Judgement was handed down in the Constitutional Court related to regulatory restrictions preventing spouses and children of South African citizens and/or permanent residents from being able to apply for their long-term visas from within South Africa without having to do so form their country of origin [Nandutu and Others v Minister of Home Affairs and Others (CCT114/18)]

Permanent residence permit: A foreigner may qualify to apply for permanent residence either in terms of section 26 of the Immigration Act (direct residence) or in terms of section 27 of the Act (indirect residence).

- Section 26 of the Act includes the following provisions for direct permanent residence:

(a) WORK : Continuous work visas and permanent employment: the applicant needs (i) to have a valid work category visa at the time of submission of his/her application (excluding ICT work visas AND (ii) have had at least 5 continuous years of work visas AND (iii) have a permanent offer/contract of employment to support the application.

(b) SPOUSES: The spouse of no less than 5 years (by marriage or life-partnership) of a South African citizen or permanent resident qualifies for permanent residence. The continued existence of the relationship through the processing of the application and for at least 2 years after date of issuance determines the validity of the permit.

(c) CHILDREN: The child (under the age of 21) of a South African citizen or permanent resident qualifies for permanent residence.

(d) SA MAJOR CHILDREN: The child (over the age of 21) of a South African citizen qualifies for permanent residence,

- Section 27 of the Act includes the following provisions for "indirect permanent residence":

(a) WORK; this provision is not being processed by the DHA as separate to section 26(a) detailed above.

(b) EXTRAORDINARY SKILLS: A foreigner who (i) has been issued a critical skills work visa and is in possession of such visa and (ii) has accrued at least 5 years of post qualification professional experiences is eligible to apply for permanent residence.

(c) BUSINESS: A foreigner who has invested in a South African business that is operating and (i) his/her foreign direct investment qualifies as per the requirements of a business visa and (ii) the business is operating in compliance with the prescribed requirements is eligible to apply for permanent residence.

(d) REFUGEE: A formally recognised Refugee who has obtained certification by the Standing Committee qualifies to apply for permanent residence.

(e) RETIREMENT: A foreigner who is in receipt of pensions and/or irrevocable annuities equivalent to no less than the minimum monthly rrepscibed amount qualifies for permanent residence.

(f) NEW WORTH: A foreigner who has a net worth of no less than the equivalent of R12million and who undertakes to pay a onceoff non-refundable fee of R120,000 to the DHA should his/her application be approved is eligible to apply for permanent residence.

(g) CRITICAL SKILLS WORK VISA PROGRAMME: A foreign national employed in occupations identified by the government as experiencing skills shortages such as higher education, engineering, information technology, healthcare and the sciences. .

———————

== Employment and Labour Market Participation ==
According to the 2022 census data, migrant-born individuals make up 8,9% of the total employed workforce, while South African-born persons constituted 91,1% of the workforce. The results of QLFS 2022 Quarter 3 data indicate that the highest percentage share of immigrants employed by industry worked in private households at 18,4%. Whilst the highest percentage share of South African born is employed in the electricity, gas and water supply with 96,7%.

== Attacks on Immigrants ==
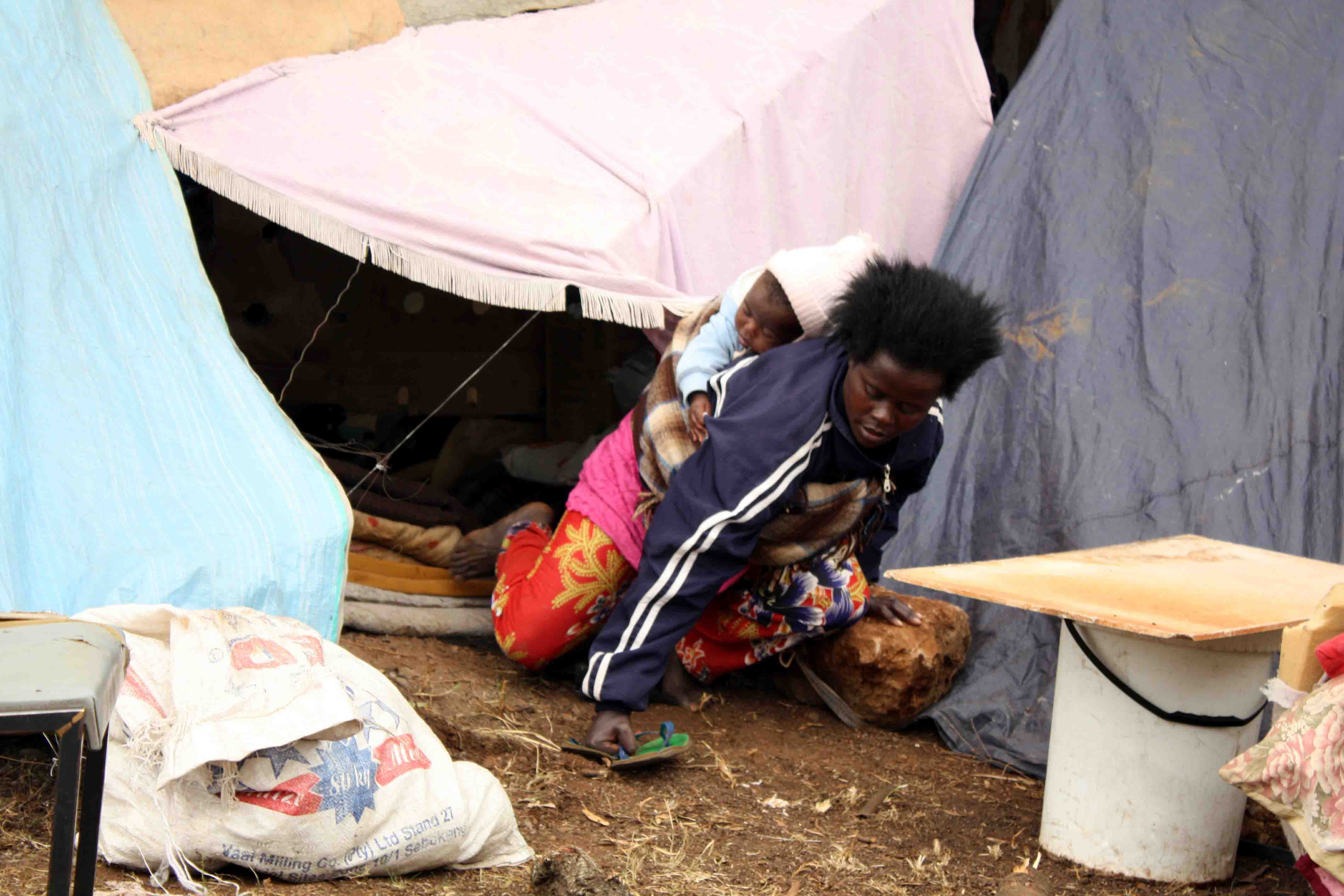
Refugees at de deur camp in South Africa following mass displacement from 2008 attacks.

In 2008, a series of riots and violent attacks against foreigners of varying origin resulted in the deaths of more than 60 people, and the displacement of over 100,000 immigrants. Many of the homeless were re-sheltered in tent settlements similar to those reserved for refugees fleeing war. Leading up to and following the violence there had been a history of locals mugging, robbing, and beating immigrants, and a deep-rooted movement of anti-immigrant sentiment that can be traced back to the apartheid.

The violence spread to other townships later that week across the Gauteng Province of South Africa with riots reported in several settlements including Diepsloot, Johannesburg central, Jeppestown, Hillbrow and others. A man was burnt to death near Reiger Park on the East Rand. Police had arrested more than 200 people on charges including murder, attempted murder, rape, public violence and robbery. Armed police used tear gas and rubber bullets to quell rioting in central Johannesburg, attacks on foreigners and looting of foreign owned shops. The violence then spread to the coastal city of Durban

Several public demonstrations emerged following the 2008 attacks in protest of xenophobia in South Africa, with slogans such as "Shame on Us," "Join the Fight Against Xenophobia," and "Don't Touch My Sista."

In 2015, there was another wave of violence against foreigners in Johannesburg and other places, which caused panic and despair in neighbouring Zimbabwe.

On 23–27 March 2019 groups armed with machetes broke into the homes of migrants in Durban. At least six people were killed, several were wounded and their homes were looted. At least 300 Malawi migrants were forced to leave the country. In separate attacks, foreign truck drivers were forced out of their vehicles and were attacked with knives. On 2 April 2019, another group of migrants in Durban was attacked and forced to flee their homes. The escalating violence added tension to the upcoming 2019 South African general election.

There have been several incidents of police brutality and high arrest rates targeting foreign-born residents.

Among the victims of trafficking which occurred in South Africa between 2002 and 2017, 70.4% were women and 13.2% were children.

Xenophobic violence against foreign nationals has continued beyond the major outbreaks of 2008 and 2015. Further waves of anti-immigrant violence and intimidation occurred in 2019 and during the early 2020s, including campaigns associated with groups such as Operation Dudula and March and March. In 2026, renewed anti-immigrant protests and vigilante activity resulted in deaths, displacement of migrants, and repatriation efforts by several African governments. Human Rights Watch, Reuters and other sources reported attacks on foreign nationals, while thousands of migrants sought refuge in temporary shelters amid fears of further violence.

== New Regulations ==
Draft Regulations were published in the Government Gazette of South Africa on 14 February 2014 for public comment. The closing date for public comment was 28 February 2014 but this was extended to 7 March 2014 to allow further submissions.

- The Act now requires that every child must possess his or her own passport.
- Study visa will be issued for the duration of the study or course.
- No business visa may be issued or renewed to a foreigner who intends to establish or invest in a business that is listed as undesirable business undertaking.
- A person issued with a business visa must employ or prove that 60% of the total staff complement is South African citizens or permanent residents.
- Quota work permit and exceptional skills work permits have been repealed. A critical skills work visa has been introduced into the Act.
- An intra-company transfer work visa will be issued for a period of four years.
- A corporate visa will be issued to South African corporate applicants to employ a number of foreigners for a period not exceeding three years, after showing the need for employment of such foreigners.
- An exchange visa (for persons under 25 years) will not be granted to conduct work pertaining to an undesirable work as published by the Minister in the Gazette, after consultation with the Minister of Trade and Industry.
- An asylum transit visa issued at a port of entry will be valid for a period of 5 days to enable the holder to report at a nearest Refugee Reception Office.
- Cross-border and transit permits have been repealed.
- Persons who overstay for a prescribed number of times will be declared as undesirable - fines will no longer be charged for overstaying.
- Section 46, which dealt with Immigration Practitioners, has been repealed as applicants will now be required to apply in person at the Mission in the country of origin or where they permanently reside.
- Couples now have to prove that they have been in a relationship for 2 years

On 28 July 2017 the South African Government has released its anticipated White Paper on Immigration that provides a policy framework for comprehensive review and overhaul of South Africa's immigration system and the introduction of significant changes over the next two years.

== See also ==
- Illegal immigration in South Africa
- Immigration to African countries
- Immigration to Ghana
