= 2023 South African National Shutdown =

Protest In response to the South African Energy Crisis

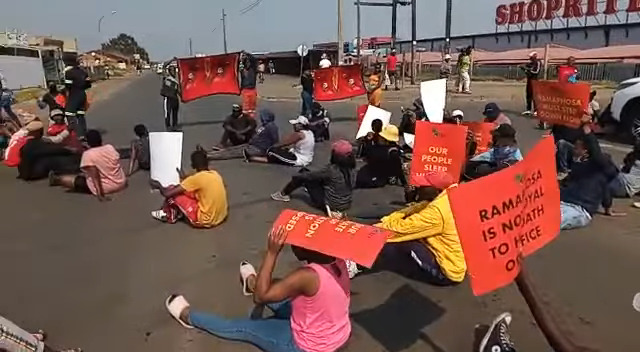
- Demonstrators at Tsakane, Gauteng
- Date: 20 March 2023
- Location: South Africa

Parties
Economic Freedom Fighters	Government of South Africa; South African National Defence Force; South African Police Service; African National Congress; Democratic Alliance

Lead figures
Julius Malema; Floyd Shivambu	Cyril Ramaphosa; Paul Mashatile; Bheki Cele; John Steenhuisen; Thandi Modise

Casualties
- Arrested: 500 confirmed

The 2023 South African National Shutdown was a protest held by the political party Economic Freedom Fighters on 20 March 2023, the day before Human Rights Day. The EFF called for the resignation of President Cyril Ramaphosa and an end to load-shedding. The leader of the EFF, Julius Malema, warned businesses countrywide to close their doors or risk being looted by them.

The Mail and Guardian speculated that the shutdown was a "dry-run" for the EFF's campaigning abilities in preparation for the 2024 general elections. Polling by the Social Research Foundation that had been carried right before the shutdown reportedly found that electoral support for the EFF had strongly declined, from 12% in July 2022 to 6% in March 2023.

== Run up to the shutdown ==
In addition to the EFF, the South African Federation of Trade Unions (SAFTU), the Land Party, and Carl Niehaus's newly formed African Radical Economic Transformation Alliance (Areta) participated in support of the shutdown. Minibus taxi companies such as SANTACO refused to support the shutdown stating that they did not want the economy to be further damaged.

The Democratic Alliance (DA) sought court interdicts against the shutdown in both the Western Cape and Gauteng provinces. The first interdict barring the shutdown organisers from forcibly closing businesses and roads and the second interdict declaring the shutdown protest unlawful. The court granted the DA's first interdict and denied the second interdict.

The South African Police Service stated that there would be no forcibly imposed national shutdown and that they had put measures in place to assure people's safety.

Over 24,000 car tires were confiscated across the country by the authorities in the hours leading up to the shutdown. The authorities stated that the tires were placed in strategic locations with the likely intent to create road blocks and set alight on the day of the shutdown. The confiscations were allegedly assisted by EFF activists posting pictures of themselves next to piles of tires on social media, which Malema had asked them not to do.

== Impact ==
On the day of the shutdown significant protest action and violence was reported in the EFF strong holds of Limpopo and Gauteng provinces where EFF critic Nhlanhla Lux's home was allegedly bombed and national bus operator Putco ceased some of its operations because of reports of intimidation. The situation was described as largely "quiet" in the provinces of KwaZulu-Natal and the Western Cape, but two roads were reportedly closed by the burning of tires in the Nelson Mandela Bay area in the Eastern Cape. An estimated 150,000 people were reported to have attended the shutdown across the country.

== Response and reactions ==
=== Assessment ===
Malema described the event as “the most successful shutdown in the history of South Africa”. Despite his earlier statement, Malema blamed the cancellation of chartered busses for protesters as a reason for the lower-than-expected turnout for the shutdown. Malema also alleged that an unnecessarily strong presence by the police and army and an unexpected lack of loadsheading also negatively impacted turnout for the protests.

The media reported that turnout for the shutdown was lower than expected, was in fact very small, and was likely a failure for the EFF, possibly damaging the party's image in the run-up to the national elections. AfriForum stated that the shutdown was a failure for the EFF. The African National Congress (ANC) thanked South Africans for not responding to the EFF's appeal to join the shutdown, and the DA also described the event as unsuccessful for the EFF and claimed that a court interdict that it had secured against intimidation during the shut down played an important role in reducing its impact.

=== Incidents of fake news ===
Julius Malema claimed that the shutdown helped reduce load shedding. However, the national power utility Eskom announced ahead of the protest a reduction of load shedding due to a decrease in demand. In fact, 20 March was designated a special school holiday by the Department of Basic Education in 2022. Former Eskom CEO André de Ruyter previously declared in January 2023 that there would be a load shedding relief by end of March. Electricity minister Kgosientsho Ramokgopa also denied any involvement of EFF with load-shedding suspension.

Social media posts have wrongfully shared footage from a previous protest, specifically the EFF march to Eskom in February 2020, claiming it was from the national shutdown.

== See also ==
- 2021 South African unrest
- 2021 South African municipal elections
- 2019 South African general election
- 2019 service delivery protests
