= James Oatway =

South African photojournalist (born 1978)

- Born: 1978 (age 47–48)
- Education: Rhodes University
- Occupation: Photojournalist
- Known for: Photography
- Notable work: Murder of Emmanuel Sithole (2015)
- Website: Official website

James Oatway (born 1978) is a South African photojournalist. He was formerly Chief Photographer of the Sunday Times.

His work focuses mainly on political and social issues in Africa, migration, and people affected by conflict. He is best known for his photographs of the 2015 murder of Mozambican immigrant Emmanuel Sithole.

== Education ==
Oatway graduated from Rhodes University in Grahamstown, South Africa, with a Bachelor of Journalism degree.

== Career ==
Oatway's work has been published in the Sunday Times, The Guardian, The New York Times, Time, Science Magazine, Harper's Magazine and various other publications around the world. He has covered conflict in the Democratic Republic of Congo and the Central African Republic, the War in Afghanistan, War in Afghanistan; The earthquake in Haiti in 2010. Oatway was a member of the picture agency Panos.

In 2010, Oatway was in Haiti, covering the aftermath of the devastating earthquake that struck the Caribbean. He was one of a group of photographers who photographed the death of Fabienne Cherisma, a fifteen-year-old girl who was allegedly shot by police during the unrest that had taken hold of Port-au-Prince. Oatway's images of the dead Cherisma featured in a portfolio awarded an “Award of Excellence” in the Pictures of the Year International Awards (POYi).

=== Emmanuel Sithole ===
On April 18, 2015, Oatway was on assignment for the Sunday Times covering xenophobic violence in Alexandra Township in Johannesburg when he photographed a group of South African men beating and stabbing Emmanuel Sithole, a Mozambican trader. Oatway and his colleague, reporter Beauregard Tromp, took Sithole to a nearby clinic but were told that no doctors were on duty. They then took Sithole to Edenvale Hospital, where he died shortly after arrival.

The photographs were published on the front page of the Sunday Times the following day and caused outrage across the region.

The South African National Defence Force (SANDF) was deployed to Alexandra the next day in an attempt to quell the violence.

Four men were arrested, and three men were convicted of Sithole's murder. Mthintha Bhengu was sentenced to 17 years in prison; Sifundo Mzimela was sentenced to 10 years, and another youth was released with a suspended sentence. In handing down the sentence, Magistrate Lucas Van der Schyff said: "This specific murder trial caught the entire country's attention because it was caught on camera. We were forced to witness this gruesome attack. By looking at the photos, we were forced to share his pain as he lay in the mud begging for mercy".

Oatway was criticized for not intervening to save Sithole. Oatway told Time "I don't have any regrets about taking the pictures ... I think my presence there distracted them and did discourage them". In response to criticism that the pictures were published, he said: "It's not easy to look at, and I understand that some people might be offended by that, but really people have to know what's happening, and people have to see the brutality and the vulgarity of what's going on, so I've got no regrets that it's on the front page". Oatway wrote an article about his experience of the incident, which was published in the Sunday Times. According to Oatway, his only regret was that he was unable to get Sithole to a hospital in time to save his life.

Greg Marinovich, Pulitzer prize winning photographer and author of The Bang-Bang Club defended Oatway's actions. He wrote: "Would Oatway sleep better had he been able to save Sithole? Surely the answer is yes, but the photographer's duty was to capture those searing images and hope that society will act."

== Awards ==
- 2008: Abdul Shariff Award (in Memory of Photographers who lost their lives in the line of duty).
- 2009: Pictures of the Year International (POYi) - Award of Excellence: Newspaper News Picture Story.
- 2010: Prix Bayeux-Calvados (des correspondents de guerre) - Finalist.
- 2010: Sony Profoto Awards: News Image of the Year.
- 2011: Pictures of the Year International (POYi) - Award of Excellence: Multimedia Project (Impact 2010).
- 2011: Vodacom Journalist of the Year Awards - Central Region Photography Winner.
- 2013: Pictures of the Year International (POYi) - 2nd Place: Newspaper Photographer of the Year.
- 2013: Pictures of the Year International (POYi) - 2nd Place: Newspaper News Picture Story.
- 2014: Standard Bank Sikuvile Journalism Awards: Finalist-News Photography.
- 2015: Vodacom Journalist of the Year - Overall National Winner (South Africa).
- 2015: Vodacom Journalist of the Year Awards - National Photography Winner.
- 2016: CNN Multichoice African Journalist of the Year Awards 2016 - Winner: Mohamed Amin Photojournalism Award.
- 2016: Standard Bank Sikuvile Journalism Awards - Winner: South African Story of the Year
- 2016: Standard Bank Sikuvile Journalism Awards - Winner: News Photography
- 2018: Visa d’or Région of Occitanie / Pyrénées-Méditerranée Feature award (Visa Pour l'Image, Perpignan, France)
- 2022: Pictures of the Year International (POYi) - Award of Excellence: Photography Book of the Year for [BR]OTHER.

== Honours ==
In 2022 James Oatway was named as one of Rhodes University’s most distinguished Journalism alumni.

In 2018, James Oatway's work on the notorious "Red Ants" eviction force in South Africa was awarded the prestigious Visa d'or Feature Award at the Visa pour l'Image International Festival of Photojournalismn Perpignan, France.

In 2015 he was on the panel of judges for the News Division of the Pictures of the Year International Awards held at the University of Missouri's School of Journalism.

In 2013 he was selected as a Taco Kuiper grantee.

He placed second in the 71st Pictures of the Year International “Newspaper Photographer of the Year” Awards. In 2016 he was the recipient of the Mohamed Amin Photojournalism Award at the prestigious CNN Multichoice African Journalism Awards.

== Books ==
Oatway published two books in 2021: The Battle of Bangui: The Inside Story of South Africa’s worst military scandal since Apartheid (Penguin Random House, 2021) and [BR]OTHER, a photographic book documenting xenophobic violence in South Africa (Jacana, 2021).

In 2021, Oatway published a photo essay documenting the lives of motorcycle food couriers in Johannesburg.
