= Operation Dudula =

Anti-immigrants vigilante organisation in South Africa

Operation Dudula is an organisation which turned into a political party in South Africa. It is often described as a fascist organisation and the group is widely recognised as being xenophobic, and has been linked with violently threatening and targeting both documented and undocumented foreigners. The group blames South Africa's porous borders, lenient immigration practices and the presence of migrants for many of South Africa's social issues. Its current leader is Zandile Dabula.

Operation Dudula was established in Soweto, a township of Johannesburg, and has since spread to other parts of the country. "Dudula" means to "force out" or "knock down" in isiZulu, and refers to the movement's goal to expel migrants. Although they have been accused of violently targeting immigrants, Operation Dudula denies having any connection to xenophobic motives.

== Origins, aims and activities ==
Operation Dudula was founded by Nhlanhla "Lux" Dlamini (also Mohlauhi). Dlamini rose to prominence for his role in defending Maponya Mall from looters in the July 2021 unrest. The group emerged from discourse that blamed migrants for the fallout and economic hardship of COVID-19 deaths and lockdowns. Operation Dudula led their first march on 16 June 2021 through Soweto targeting people who they believed were foreign drug traffickers and businesses that they thought employed immigrants. The march increased their popularity and in the following months, several other anti-immigrant groups also going by Dudula or some variation of the name, such as the separate Alexandra Dudula Movement, were established. In April 2022, Operation Dudula expanded to Durban, KwaZulu Natal, and in May 2022, to Western Cape Province.

Operation Dudula states that its campaign is aimed at addressing crime, a lack of jobs and poor health services caused by an "influx of illegal immigrants". They have campaigned for small businesses to only employ South Africans, and for migrant shop keepers to close down and leave South Africa. Operation Dudula has been accused of a number of instances of violence against African immigrants in South African townships, including forcibly closing shops and raiding properties.

In March 2022, Dlamini was arrested on charges of orchestrating a raid of EFF member Victor Ramerafe's Dobsonville home where Operation Dudula claimed drugs were being sold; he duly received two suspended sentences. In July 2022, Dlamini left Operation Dudula to concentrate on his work with the Soweto Parliament; this was due to disagreements between the two groups over immigration.

In July and August 2022, Operation Dudula targeted and confronted illegal migrants who occupied buildings in Johannesburg's inner city. The group has no membership structure, is highly visible on social media and is composed of mainly affected community members.

In May 2023, it declared itself as a political party intending to contest the 2024 elections.

Other organisations associated with Operation Dudula include:

- South Africa First campaign
- Alexandra Dudula Movement
- All Truck Drivers Foundation
- MKMVA – the UMkhonto we Sizwe Military Veterans' Association (disbanded).

== Response ==
Operation Dudula has been termed Afrophobic. Supporters of migrant rights argue that Operation Dudula is unjustly blaming migrants for economic hardship caused by South Africa's deep inequality.

Some opposition groups against Operation Dudula have been formed. Kopanang Africa against Xenophobia (KAAX) is a group established in opposition to Operation Dudula. In 2023, KAAX and other civil society groups filed a court case against Operation Dudula, seeking to prevent the group from assaulting foreign nationals and to end their efforts to try to block access to schools and health care services for foreigners. The South African Department of Home Affairs and Police Services were later added to the case, for failing to protect vulnerable communities. The case finally made it to court in June 2025.

In April 2022, after civil society pressure, president Cyril Ramaphosa denounced Operation Dudula as illegal vigilantism. Although Operation Dudula at the time was unaffiliated with a political party, its leaders have received public support from Patriotic Alliance leaders Gayton McKenzie and Kenny Kunene.

== Election results ==
The party got 2,664 votes or 0.07% in Gauteng, 736 votes or 0.05% in Limpopo.

=== Provincial elections ===
Election	Eastern Cape		Free State		Gauteng		Kwazulu-Natal		Limpopo		Mpumalanga		North-West		Northern Cape		Western Cape	
Election	%	Seats	%	Seats	%	Seats	%	Seats	%	Seats	%	Seats	%	Seats	%	Seats	%	Seats
2024					0.07	0/80			0.05	0/64							0.02	0/42

== See also ==
- Makwerekwere
- South African nationalism
- Xenophobia in South Africa
