= Operation Fiela =

Police operation to dismantle crime in South Africa

Operation Fiela (‘sweep’ in Sesotho) is an ongoing joint operation by the South African Police Service (SAPS), which includes some other departments of the government. The South African National Defence Force (SANDF) was also involved in the first few months, in 2015. Among others, this operation was aimed at ridding the country of illegal weapons, drug dens, prostitution rings and other illegal activities in the country.

== History ==
Operation Fiela was initially launched after a series of xenophobic attacks in the province of Kwazulu-Natal and some parts of Gauteng province. The South African National Defence Force was involved in a support role during the first three months of the operation, from 21 April 2015 to 30 June 2015.

Operation Fiela II was launched in January 2018 given the apparent success of the first operation in 2015. Near to a decade after its launch, in 2024, Operation Fiela began investigating poisonings from expired food at spaza shops. However, though the operations were created to combat illegal weapons and drugs in the wake of xenophobic attacks, they have been accused of disproportionately targeting foreigners from the rest of Africa and sometimes South African citizens.
