= Xenophobia in South Africa =

Attacks against foreigners in South Africa

Prior to 1994, Economic migrants from Africa faced resistance and even occasional violence in South Africa due to competition for scarce economic opportunities. After majority rule in 1994, contrary to expectations, the incidence of xenophobia increased. In 2008, at least 62 people were killed in the xenophobic uprising and attacks. In 2015, another nationwide spike in xenophobic attacks against immigrants in general prompted a number of foreign governments to begin repatriating their citizens. A Pew Research poll conducted in 2018 showed that 62% of South Africans expressed negative sentiment about foreign nationals living and working in South Africa, believing that immigrants are a burden on society by taking jobs and social benefits and that 61% of South Africans thought that immigrants were more responsible for crime than other groups. There is no factual evidence to substantiate the notion that immigrants are the main culprits of criminal activity in South Africa, even though the claim is incorrectly made sometimes by politicians and public figures. Between 2010 and 2017 the number of foreigners living in South Africa increased from 2 million people to 4 million people. The proportion of South Africa's total population that is foreign born increased from 2.8% in 2005 to 7% in 2019, according to the United Nations International Organization for Migration, South Africa is the largest recipient of immigrants on the African continent.

== Xenophobia in South Africa before 1994 ==
Local people and immigrants have faced discrimination and even violence in South Africa due to competition for scarce economic opportunities. Xenophobia has a long and complex history and many instances of state sanctioned Xenophobia can be found in South Africa's history. For example, in 1820, poor English migrants or settlers sought a better life in the Zuurveld region (now Albany) and emigrated to this area under a government scheme. A series of Xhosa Wars had dispossessed Xhosa tribes of their land and had made this migration possible. This Xhosa dispossession / English expansion continued. In 1835, land west of the Kei River was annexed by Benjamin D'urban (this was reversed) and then again in 1847, when the British Empire extended its influence beyond the Cape of Good hope into an undefined area and appointed Sir Harry Smith as Governor and High Commissioner of the Cape Colony. Who conquered the Ngqika and the Ndlambe, and re-annexed Kaffraria. Smith was also known for his pantomimes of power, including blowing up wagons when negotiating with local chiefs.

=== Attacks against Mozambican and Congolese immigrants ===
Between 1984 and the end of hostilities in that country, an estimated 50,000 to 350,000 Mozambicans fled to South Africa. While never granted refugee status they were technically allowed to settle in the bantustans or black homelands created during the apartheid system. The reality was more varied, with the homeland of Lebowa banning Mozambican settlers outright while Gazankulu welcomed the refugees with support in the form of land and equipment. Those in Gazankulu, however, found themselves confined to the homeland and liable for deportation should they officially enter South Africa, and evidence exists that their hosts denied them access to economic resources.

Unrest and civil war likewise saw large numbers of Congolese people emigrate to South Africa, many illegally, in 1993 and 1997. Subsequent studies found indications of xenophobic attitudes towards these refugees, typified by them being denied access to the primary healthcare to which they were technically entitled.

== Xenophobia in South Africa after 1994 ==
Despite a lack of directly comparable data, xenophobia in South Africa is perceived to have significantly increased after the election of a Black majority government in 1994. Academic Audie Klotz states that following South Africa's transition to democracy in 1994 a new "non-racial xenophobia" has emerged in the country that has specifically targeted refugees. According to a 2004 study published by the Southern African Migration Project (SAMP):

"The ANC government – in its attempts to overcome the divides of the past and build new forms of social cohesion ... embarked on an aggressive and inclusive nation-building project. One unanticipated by-product of this project has been a growth in intolerance towards outsiders ... Violence against foreign citizens and African refugees has become increasingly common and communities are divided by hostility and suspicion."

The study was based on a citizen survey across member states of the Southern African Development Community (SADC) and found South Africans expressing the harshest anti-immigrant sentiment, with 21% of South Africans in favour of a complete ban on foreign entry and 64% in favour of strict limitations on the numbers permitted. By contrast, the next-highest proportion of respondents in favour of a complete ban on immigration were in neighbouring Namibia, and Botswana, at 10%.

=== Foreigners and the South African Police Service ===
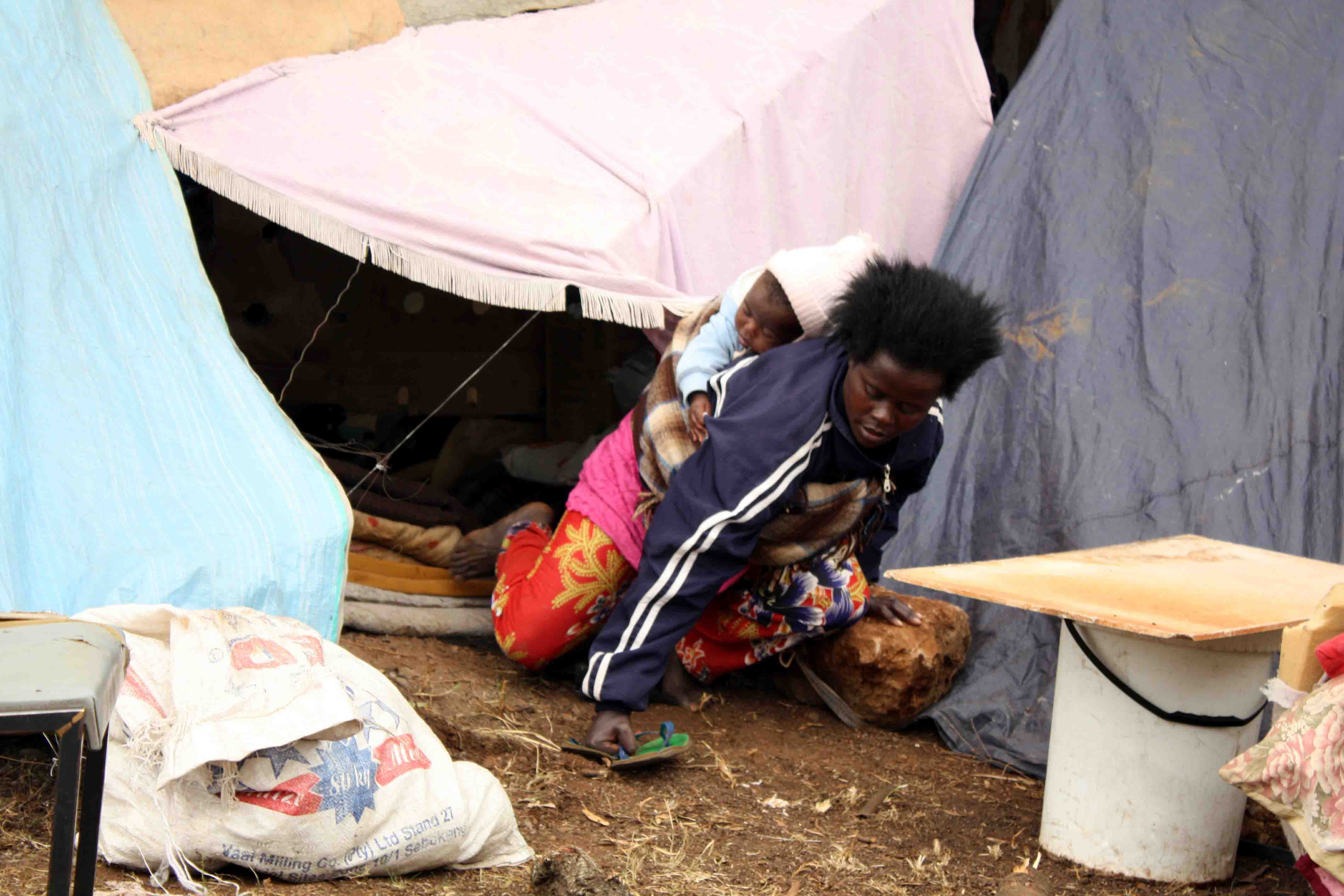
Burundian refugee afraid of re-integration into South African society living rough, 2009

A 2004 study by the Centre for the Study of Violence and Reconciliation (CSVR) of attitudes amongst police officers in the Johannesburg area found that 87% of respondents believed that most undocumented immigrants in Johannesburg are involved in crime, despite there being no statistical evidence to substantiate the perception. Such views combined with the vulnerability of illegal immigrants

led to abuse, including violence and extortion, some analysts argued.

In a March 2007 meeting with Home Affairs Minister Nosiviwe Mapisa-Nqakula, a representative of Burundian refugees in Durban claimed that immigrants could not rely on police for protection, but instead found police mistreating them, stealing from them and making unconfirmed allegations that they sell drugs. Two years earlier, at a similar meeting in Johannesburg, Mapisa-Nqakula had admitted that refugees and asylum seekers were mistreated by police with xenophobic attitudes.

=== Violence before May 2008 ===
According to a 1998 Human Rights Watch report, immigrants from Malawi, Zimbabwe and Mozambique living in the Alexandra township were "physically assaulted over a period of several weeks in January 1995, as armed gangs identified suspected undocumented migrants and marched them to the police station in an attempt to 'clean' the township of foreigners." The campaign, known as "Buyelekhaya" (go back home), blamed foreigners for crime, unemployment and sexual attacks.

In September 1998, a Mozambican national and two Senegalese citizens were thrown out of a train. The assault was carried out by a group returning from a rally that blamed foreigners for unemployment, crime and the spread of AIDS.

In 2000, seven foreigners were killed on the Cape Flats over a five-week period in what police described as xenophobic murders possibly motivated by the fear that outsiders would claim property belonging to locals.

In October 2001, residents of the Zandspruit informal settlement gave Zimbabwean citizens ten days to leave the area. When the foreigners failed to leave voluntarily, they were forcefully evicted and their shacks were burned down and looted. Community members said they were angry that Zimbabweans were employed whilst locals remained jobless and blamed the foreigners for a number of crimes. No injuries were reported amongst the affected Zimbabweans.

In the last week of 2005 and first week of 2006, at least four people, including two Zimbabweans, died in the Olievenhoutbosch settlement after foreigners were blamed for the death of a local man. Shacks belonging to foreigners were set alight and locals demanded that police remove all immigrants from the area.

In August 2006, Somali refugees appealed for protection after 21 Somali traders were killed in July of that year and 26 more in August. The immigrants believed the murders to be motivated by xenophobia, although police rejected the assertion of a concerted campaign to drive Somali traders out of townships in the Western Cape.

Attacks on foreign nationals increased markedly in late-2007 and it is believed that there were at least a dozen attacks between January and May 2008. The most severe incidents occurred on 8 January 2008 when two Somali shop owners were murdered in the Eastern Cape towns of Jeffreys Bay and East London, then in March 2008 when seven people were killed including Zimbabweans, Pakistanis and a Somali national after their shops and shacks were set alight in Atteridgeville near Pretoria.

== May 2008 riots ==
2008 South Africa riots
- Part of the history of South Africa
- Map of South Africa
Date	May 2008
Location	Gauteng, Durban, Mpumalanga; South Africa
Result	62 people dead, several hundred injured, voluntary deportation of immigrants to home countries, destruction of immigrant-owned property

On 12 May 2008 a series of riots started in the township of Alexandra (in the north-eastern part of Johannesburg) when locals attacked migrants from Mozambique, Malawi and Zimbabwe, killing two people and injuring 40 others. Some attackers were reported to have been singing Jacob Zuma's campaign song Umshini Wami (Zulu: "Bring Me My Machine Gun"). In the following weeks the violence spread, first to other settlements in the Gauteng Province, then to the coastal cities of Durban and Cape Town. Attacks were also reported in parts of the Southern Cape, Mpumalanga, the North West and Free State.

By the end of the riots 62 people were reported dead. 1400 suspects were arrested in connection with the violence. Nine months after the attacks 128 individuals had been convicted and 30 found not guilty in 105 concluded court cases. 208 cases had been withdrawn and 156 were still being heard. One year after the attacks prosecutors said that 137 people had been convicted, 182 cases had been withdrawn because witnesses or complainants had left the country, 51 cases were underway or ready for trial and 82 had been referred for further investigation. The Central Methodist Mission, Johannesburg became a sanctuary for many during the unrest.

In May 2009, one year after the attacks the Consortium for Refugees and Migrants in South Africa (Cormsa) said that foreigners remained under threat of violence and that little had been done to address the causes of the attacks. The organisation complained of a lack of accountability for those responsible for public violence, insufficient investigations into the instigators and the lack of a public government inquiry.

== 2009–12 ==
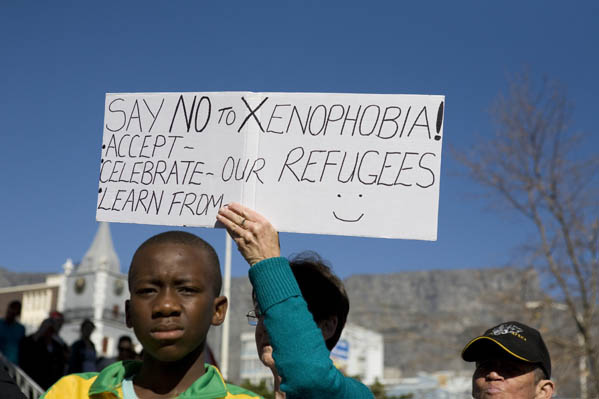
Anti-xenophobia walk on Mandela Day 2010, Cape Town

In late May 2009, reports emerged regarding a possible resurgence of xenophobic related activity and the organising of attacks in the Western Cape. Reports of threats and secret meetings by local businessmen surfaced in Gugulethu, Khayelitsha and Philippi, Cape Town. Samora Machel in Philippi once again emerging as a flash-point. In Gugulethu, reports emerged of secret meetings by local businessmen discussing 'what to do about Somali shopkeepers'. The Anti-Eviction Campaign brought these issues to the open by organising a series of anti-xenophobia meetings attempting to find the root cause of the crisis.

In November 2009, a community of 1500-2500 Zimbabwean farm workers was forcibly evicted from their homes in the informal settlements of De Doorns, a grape-farming town in the Western Cape. No persons were physically assaulted but homes were trashed and looted and this led to the biggest displacement of foreign nationals since May 2008. The Zimbabweans were then housed in a displaced persons' camp where some remained for a year until it was closed. Researchers identified the role of a ward councillor, Mpumelelo Lubisi, in inciting the attack in possible collusion with informal labour brokers who had financial interests in getting rid of their Zimbabwean competitors. South African workers also accused farmers of employing the Zimbabweans at less than minimum wage (farmers and Zimbabwean workers denied this).

In 2010 the press carried numerous articles claiming that there would be massive planned xenophobic violence at the end of the 2010 Football World Cup. However this did not happen.

In July 2012 there were new attacks in parts of Cape Town and in Botshabelo in the Free State.

=== "Fortress South Africa" ===
South Africa's borders were re-militarised. According to Christopher McMichael:

"This shared state-corporate project of building up a 'fortress South Africa' also reveals a deeply entrenched seam of xenophobia, in which undocumented migrants and refugees from African countries are painted as a security risk akin to terrorism and organised crime. Parliamentary discussions on border security are rife with claims that foreign nationals are attempting to drain social grants and economic opportunities from citizens. The packaging of illegal immigration as a national security threat, which often relies on unsubstantiated claims about the inherent criminality of foreign nationals, provides an official gloss on deeply entrenched governmental xenophobia, in which African immigrants are targets for regular harassment, rounding up and extortion by the police. This normalisation of immigrants as figures of resentment may also fuel outbreaks of xenophobic violence."

== 2013–19 ==
=== Attacks against Somali entrepreneurs ===
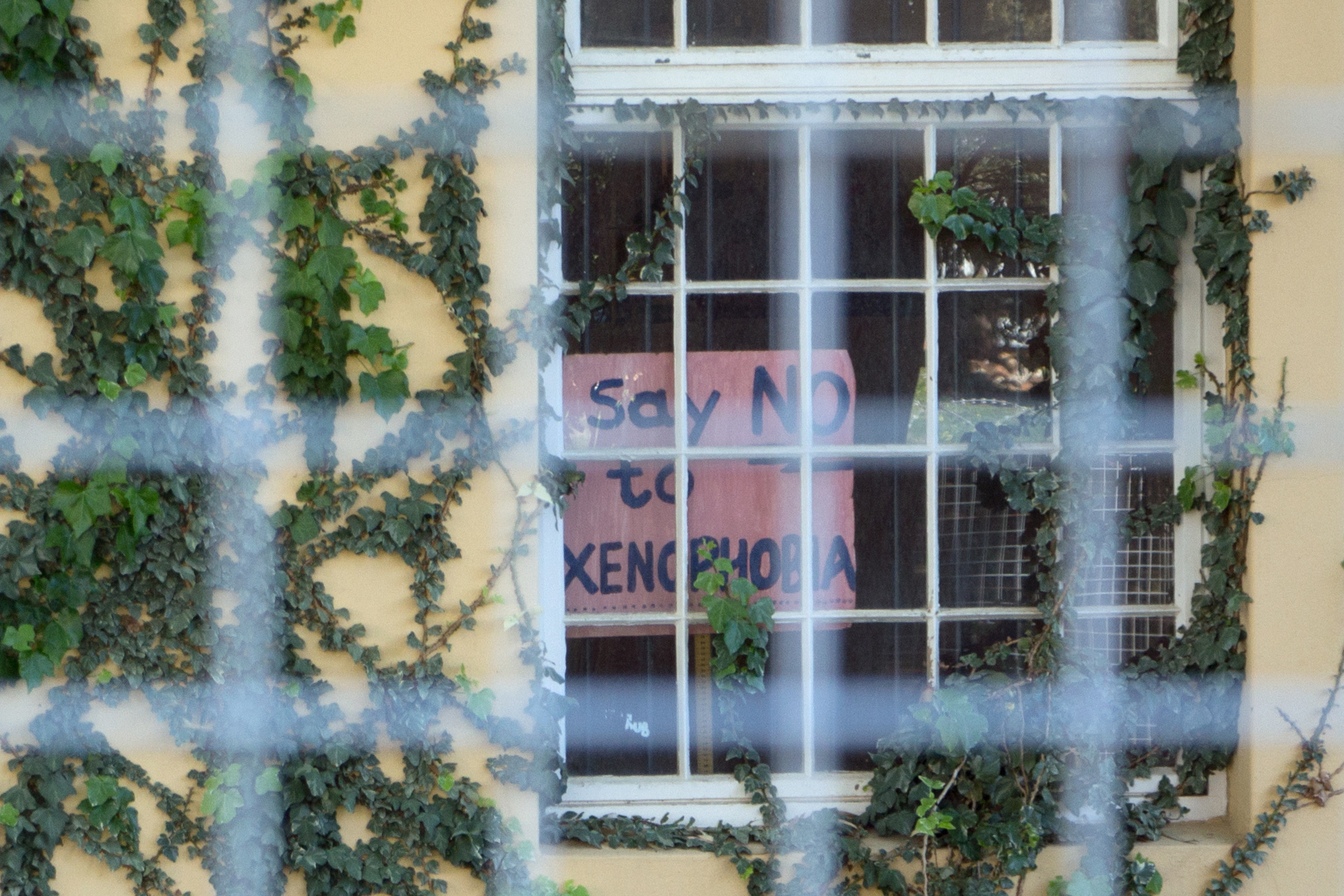
Anti-xenophobia poster, Harold Cressy High School, Cape Town 2014

On 30 May 2013, 25-year-old Abdi Nasir Mahmoud Good, was stoned to death. The violence was captured on a mobile phone and shared on the Internet.

Three Somali shopkeepers had been killed in June 2013 and the Somali government requested the South African authorities to do more to protect their nationals. Among those murdered were two brothers who were allegedly hacked to death. The attacks led to public outcry and worldwide protests by the Somali diaspora, in Cape Town, London and Minneapolis.

South African Foreign Minister Maite Nkoana-Mashabane expressed the government's "strongest condemnation" of the violence which had seen looting and the death of a Somali shopkeeper. Somali Prime Minister Abdi Farah Shirdon expressed concern for the safety of Somalis in South Africa, calling on the government there to intervene to stop violence against Somali people after deadly attacks in Pretoria and Port Elizabeth.

On 7 June 2014, a Somali national, in his 50s, was reportedly stoned to death and two others were seriously injured when the angry mob of locals attacked their shop in extension 6, late on Saturday. Three more Somalis were wounded from gunshots and shops were looted.

After another round of xenophobic violence against Somali entrepreneurs in April 2015, Somalia's government announced that it would evacuate its citizens from South Africa.

=== April 2015 attacks ===
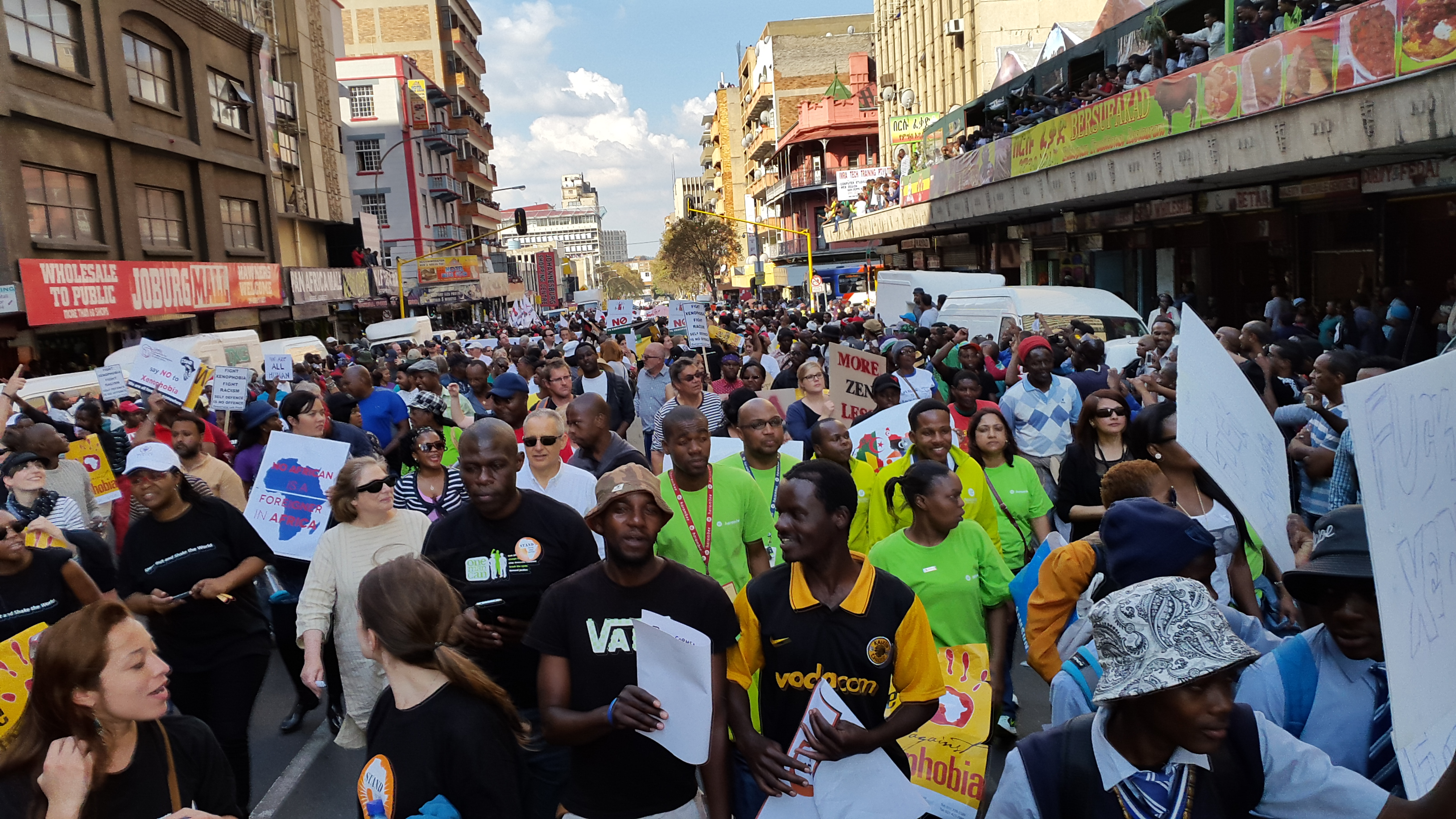
March against xenophobia, Johannesburg, 23 April 2015

In April 2015, there was an upsurge in xenophobic attacks throughout the country. The attacks started in Durban and spread to Johannesburg. Zulu King Goodwill Zwelithini was accused of aggravating the attacks by saying that foreigners should "go back to their countries". Moreover, foreigners, being a minority group with hardly any political muscle, they were an easy target of "the majority of black working class citizens."

Locals looted foreigners' shops and attacked immigrants in general, forcing hundreds to relocate to police stations across the country. The Malawian authorities subsequently began repatriating their nationals, and a number of other foreign governments also announced that they would evacuate their citizens. More than 300 people were arrested. On 18 April 2015, a photographer from the Sunday Times, James Oatway, photographed a brutal attack on a Mozambican man. The man, Emmanuel Sithole, died from his wounds. Four suspects were arrested within days of the publication of photographs in the edition of 19 April of The Sunday Times of the murder of Mozambican street vendor Emmanuel Sithole in Alexandra township the previous day. Sithole's name was not included in the official list of seven victims killed in the April 2015 attacks, including an Ethiopian, a Mozambican, a Bangladeshi, a Zimbabwean and three South Africans who were all killed in KwaZulu-Natal.

Despite the government's insistence that Sithole's murder was not xenophobic, the South African National Defence Force (SANDF) was deployed in Alexandra township following the publication of the images. On 23 April several thousand demonstrators marched through central Johannesburg to protest against a spate of deadly attacks on immigrants. They sang songs denouncing xenophobia and carried banners that read "We are all Africans" as migrant workers crowded balconies, shouting their support.

=== October 2015 attacks ===
In October 2015 there were sustained xenophobic attacks in Grahamstown in the Eastern Cape. It was reported that more than 500 people were displaced and more than 300 shops and homes looted and, in some cases, destroyed altogether. In these attacks Muslims were specifically targeted.

The Grahamstown xenophobic attacks that took place on 21 October 2015, and coincided with the FeesMustFall protest at Rhodes University, lasted for several days.

The attacks were instigated by the taxi drivers' protests, where the drivers' were protesting over the terrible state of roads, the rise in crime and rumours of murders committed by foreigners. Their demands were that the mayor ought to do something about their grievances. Their grievances were not addressed by the mayor.

On 21 October 2015 taxi drivers attacked spaza shops owned by Pakistani, Somali, Bangladeshi and Ethiopian residents of Grahamstown. There was a mobilisation of people by the taxi drivers, with the aim of attacking and looting shops owned by foreigners. There was a rumour that insinuated that foreigners were responsible for the rampant murders in town: that an "Arab man had killed and mutilated women" around town and that the police had not done anything to address these rumours. Grahamstown residents in the townships were angry at the police for not doing anything to dispel the rumours, despite having been warned by the councillors that the residents might end up taking the law into their own hands. Thus, it was these rumours that incited the attacks on foreigners.

On 23 October, the Makana Municipality held a town meeting at City Hall. The meeting was focused on how the municipality and the South African police would pacify the residents and address the situation. During that meeting, there was no representative from the police and one of the ward councillors further legitimized the attacks through xenophobic sentiments centred on not giving foreigners a platform to have their own shops. The attacks continued, with taxi drivers transporting looters for free, according to the residents of Grahamstown.

Reports from the residents alleged that the police's attitudes were that of indifference, with some participating in the looting. The policing of the attacks was elitist as there was a line on Beaufort street which pointed out where looting would be tolerated and where it would not be. Thus, looting was allowed in the township and not tolerated in town. The police only pacified the situation and restored order after a week of attacks and looting. The xenophobic attacks in Grahamstown differed from the usual xenophobic attacks in South Africa as the ones in Grahamstown were mostly targeted at Muslims. The main reason why Muslims were targeted was mainly due to the rumour that an Arab man was responsible for the murder of women in the town.

=== 2016 Tshwane riots ===
From 20 to 23 June 2016 a wave of riots hit the City of Tshwane. Although the riots were sparked by political discontent within the ANC, Somali, Pakistani and other foreign owned shops and micro enterprises were targeted for looting and a number of foreigners were attacked.

=== 2017 Anti-immigration Protest ===
On Friday 24 February 2017 a large scale and officially sanctioned anti-immigrant protest was organised and held in the Pretoria. Protesters marched to the Foreign Ministry and handed a petition to government representatives. Protesters accused immigrants of taking jobs from South Africans, causing crime, and complained that "[t]hey are arrogant and they don't know how to talk to people, especially Nigerians." 136 protesters were arrested during the march.

=== 2019 Durban riots ===
On 25 March 2019 xenophobic riots targeting African immigrants broke out in Sydenham, Jadhu Place and Overport areas of Durban. Around one hundred people attacked businesses owned by foreign nationals resulting in around 50 people seeking shelter in a local police station and mosque. Three people were killed in the riot. A speech given by President Cyril Ramaphosa at the ANC's election manifesto for the 2019 South African general election was blamed for contributing to xenophobic feeling wherein Ramaphosa committed to cracking down on undocumented foreigners involved in criminal activities. The attacks on foreigners was criticised by both the South African government and political parties amidst calls to ensure that xenophobic sentiment was not exploited for electoral purposes.

=== 2019 Johannesburg riots ===
On 1 September 2019, riots and looting targeting shops owned by foreign nationals broke out in Jeppestown and Johannesburg CBD following the death of a taxi driver. By 3 September, police had made 189 arrests for looting. Around 50 businesses predominantly owned by Nigerians from the rest of the continent were reportedly destroyed or damaged during the incident. The riots coincided with a nationwide truck driver strike protesting against the employment of non-South African truckers. After riots resulted in 12 deaths in the first week of September, 640 of an estimated 100,000 Nigerians in South Africa signed up to take free flights offered by Nigeria to return to their home country. The riots led to a sit-in protest in Greenmarket Square, Cape Town by refugees demanding to be relocated to a third country outside of South Africa and other than their country of origin.

== 2020–present ==
Reports of xenophobic attacks targeting foreign truck drivers and other foreigners were recorded during the 2021 South African unrest.

=== Operation Dudula ===
Reports of harassment of immigrant traders in Soweto and Johannesburg by a group dubbed "Operation Dudula" (meaning: "to push" or "to remove by force" in isiZulu) began emerging in mid-January 2022. This was preceded by a social media campaign in June 2020 calling for action against immigrants under the Operation Dudula banner. The Tsietsi Mashinini Centre in Soweto, a known refuge for refugees and foreign nationals, was raided by supporters of Operation Dudula on 6 February 2022. On 12 and 13 February 2022 residents of Soweto and Alexandra marched to Hillbrow and Orange Grove under the Operation Dudula banner to forcibly remove foreigners claiming that undocumented foreign nationals were responsible for rising levels of crimes and immoral activity such as drug dealing and prostitution. High rates of unemployment and lack of economic opportunities for South African nationals were also cited as grievances by the group. Police forcibly dispersed the Operation Dudula marchers which resulted in clashes between the two groups.

=== Dudula Movement ===
The Dudula Movement, a similar although unrelated movement to Operation Dudula, emerged around the same time in Alexandra, Johannesburg. Acting as a vigilante organisation, it targets foreign nationals its members believe to be undocumented. The group has been accused of only targeting black foreign nationals. Members of the movement have expressed grievances with lawlessness, unemployment, and a lack of economic opportunities as reasons for joining.

=== Miss South Africa 2024 ===
In the Miss South Africa 2024 pageant, model Chidimma Vanessa Onwe Adetshina, who reached the Top 9 finalists, faced controversy regarding her eligibility. Allegations emerged concerning her mother's acquisition of South African citizenship and due to her father being a Nigerian national, leading to an investigation by the Department of Home Affairs, which found preliminary evidence of potential identity fraud. The public argued that Adetshina's citizenship did not disqualify her from representing the country, while others contended that her Nigerian heritage should preclude her from competing. The investigation prompted Adetshina to withdraw from the pageant, citing xenophobic-discriminatory safety and welfare concerns.

The controversy ignited a broader debate on citizenship, identity, and representation in South Africa. The Department of Home Affairs addressed the dispute regarding Adetshina's nationality. In an interview with Clement Manyathela on 702 News, The Deputy Minister of the Department of Home Affairs Njabulo Nzuza outlined the basics of citizenship as defined by the South African Citizenship Act. He explained that citizenship can be acquired through birth, heritage, or naturalisation. Specifically, he noted that citizenship is typically conferred either by jus soli or jus sanguinis.

The Minister of Sports, Arts, and Culture Gayton McKenzie faced criticism for xenophobic and Anti-African sentiment remarks after he congratulated a European-descent South African swimmer in the midst of Adetshina competing in the pageant. Previously, McKenzie allegedly argued that Adetshina, despite being born in South Africa, could not be considered South African due to her Nigerian names, which contradicts the Citizenship Act of South Africa. He further stated that individuals of Nigerian and Mozambican descent should not represent South Africa in the Miss South Africa contest, despite the acceptance of an Indian descent contestant, as Miss Universe South Africa 2023. Following backlash, McKenzie announced he would investigate Adetshina's citizenship status to verify her South African identity and stated he would only apologise should the investigation confirm her citizenship.

The President of the Nigerian Citizens Association South Africa (NICASA), Frank Onyekwelu released a statement in support of Adetshina, lauding her as a genuine ambassador of peace. He highlighted that her participation in the pageant was instrumental in promoting unity and conveying messages of tolerance, countering racism, discrimination, and hatred. By endorsing Adetshina, the NICASA President emphasised the value of embracing diversity and fostering inclusivity, noting that her involvement could positively influence societal attitudes and enhance relationships between communities.

=== 2026 anti-foreigner protests ===
In January 2026 members of Operation Dudula occupied a school and prevented people of foreign origin to enter. In May 2026 armed demonstrations erupted in South Africa against what they call "illegal foreigners". In Johannesburg demonstrators would identify whether a bystander is a foreigner before attacking them. The group "Concerned citizens and the voters of SA" had called for a nationwide shutdown on May 4 and demanding the return of documented or undocumented foreign nationals.

The protests resulted in the repatriation of foreign nationals in South Africa to a number of other African countries. On May 3, five Ethiopian migrants were killed in a series of xenophobic attacks in Johannesburg, three of whom were shot dead inside a McDonald's restaurant. On May 4, Nigerian foreign minister Bianca Odumegwu-Ojukwu announced that it launched a "voluntary operation" to return 150 of their citizens, adding that two Nigerians were killed in incidents connected to South African security personnel a month prior. On May 13, Ghanaian foreign minister Samuel Okudzeto Ablakwa announced plans to evacuate about 300 citizens from South Africa following attacks targeting sub-Saharan African migrants. The first batch of 300 Ghanaian nationals evacuated from South Africa arrived at Accra International Airport on 27th May, and were received by the Minister for Foreign Affairs, Chief of Staff and other government officials. On June 2, Mozambique reports that five of its nationals were killed during anti-immigration violence in Mossel Bay, Western Cape, South Africa, over the week along with two while trying to return to their country. Mozambique said that over 300 Mozambicans returned home by their own means on Saturday and that an additional 500 were going to be repatriated from Monday. By mid-July the South African government announced that over 50,000 foreign nationals had been deported or repatriated following a migration management plan launched in response to the protests.

The protests and resulting violence had a negative impact on South Africa's foreign relations with a number of other African countries including Ghana, Nigeria, and Mozambique.

A formal petition submitted to the International Criminal Court (ICC) by two Ghanaian citizens has called for an international investigation into xenophobic violence in South Africa. The petition alleges that the systemic attacks against foreign nationals in the country have escalated to the level of crimes against humanity.

== Reactions ==
South African Small Business Development Minister Lindiwe Zulu said that foreign business owners cannot expect to co-exist peacefully with local business owners unless they share their trade secrets. According to Zulu, foreign business owners had an advantage over South African business owners due to marginalisation under apartheid. "They cannot barricade themselves in and not share their practices with local business owners," Zulu said. The comments were met with widespread criticism.

An inquiry by the Competition Commission – the country's anti-trust regulator, has indicated that a difference in performance between foreign and local business owners has created a perception that foreigners are more successful than locals. While there is nothing wrong with examining the dynamics of competition, the insinuation that foreign business owners were to blame for the decline of South African-owned small business was worrying.

Vanya Gastrow, a researcher from the African Centre for Migration in Johannesburg, published a case study on the economics of small traders in South Africa. The study titled "Somalinomics", outlined the trade practices of Somali traders in South Africa. According to Gastrow, most small foreign retailers set a low mark-up to make a high turnover, they locate their businesses in highly trafficked pedestrian areas, they open early and close late and have a wider product range.

The South African Broadcasting Corporation conducted an interview with social media analyst Preetesh Sewraj which warned of the impact of fake news stories which were being used to create panic amongst South Africans.

== Politics ==
Xenophobic statements were commonly made by politicians from a wide range of political parties during the 2019 South African general election. This has intensified as the ruling party risks losing its dominance of the political landscapes and parties from across the spectrum have relied on anti-immigrant messaging to bolster electoral support. Much of the local mobilisation appears rooted in struggles to control lucrative township tenders.

The politician Herman Mashaba and his political party ActionSA have consistently advocated a hard-line position against immigration resulting in accusations by other political parties that they are xenophobic or pandering to xenophobic sentiments. Some of Mashaba's statements have been linked by the civil society organizations Amnesty International and Right2Know to incidence of xenophobic attacks and anti-migrant sentiment. In addition to ActionSA political parties such as the ANC, Congress of the People, DA, Economic Freedom Fighters (EFF), Freedom Front Plus, IFP, and Patriotic Alliance have all made statements or committed actions that have been regarded as xenophobic or voicing xenophobic sentiment.

== Legislation ==
The Refugees Act of 1998 initially granted significant rights to asylum seekers, however these rights were curtailed in later amendments passed in 2008, 2011, and 2017. The right of refugees to basic healthcare and education has been removed, their right to seek work has been significantly limited, and refugees must now remain in the country for 10 years to apply for Permanent residency. In addition, refugee seekers are denied asylum if they enter the country through an unrecognised port of entry, or fail to report to a Refugee Reception Office within 5 days of entering the country.

In 2020 the Gauteng Provincial government proposed Gauteng Township Economic Development Bill which seeks to prevent businesses operated by foreign nationals without official South African residency from operating businesses in the province's informal economy. Supporters of the bill state that it will reduce xenophobia by clearing up regulatory regimes that foreigners are accused of regularly violating whilst detractors of the bill state that its explicit targeting of foreigners is itself xenophobic and legitimises xenophobia.

In March 2022, Employment and Labour Minister Thulas Nxesi introduced a draft National Labour Migration Policy that lays out a quota system that limits the number of foreign nationals employed in certain sectors of the economy. The draft legislation has been criticized as xenophobic.

== See also ==
- Immigration to South Africa
- Racism in South Africa
- Operation Fiela
- Illegal immigration to South Africa
