= Illegal immigration to South Africa =

Illegal immigration to South Africa refers to migration of foreign nationals to South Africa without the authorisation of the South African authorities. Several estimates on the size of the population of irregular migrants in South Africa exist but are described as inaccurate. The use of the term "irregular", as opposed to "illegal", is the accepted academic terminology.

== Xenophobia ==
The sociologist Alice Bloch notes that migrants in South Africa have been the victims of xenophobia and violence, regardless of their immigration status.

Refugees from poorer neighbouring countries include many immigrants from the Democratic Republic of the Congo, Mozambique, Zimbabwe, Malawi, and others, who represent a large portion of the informal sector. With high unemployment levels for poorer South Africans, xenophobia is prevalent, and many South Africans feel resentful of immigrants, who are seen to be depriving the native population of jobs, a feeling that has been given credibility by the fact that many South African employers have employed migrants from other countries for lower pay than South African citizens, especially in the construction, tourism, agriculture, and domestic service industries. Illegal immigrants are also heavily involved in informal trading. However, many immigrants to South Africa continue to live in poor conditions, and the South African immigration policy has become increasingly restrictive since 1994.
